= 2009 Home Depot Center USTA Challenger – Doubles =

Doubles
- 2009 Home Depot Center USTA Challenger

Final
- Champions: (United States) Scott Lipsky (United States) David Martin
- Runners-up: (United States) Lester Cook (United States) Donald Young
- Score: 7–6(3), 4–6, 10–6

Events
Singles	Doubles
← 2008 ·	Home Depot Center USTA Challenger	· 2010 →

Carsten Ball and Travis Rettenmaier were the defending champions, but Ball chose to not participate this year.
Rettenmaier partnered up with Brett Ross. They lost to Luka Gregorc and Andrea Stoppini in the first round.
Scott Lipsky and David Martin won in the final 7–6(3), 4–6, 10–6, against Lester Cook and Donald Young.

== Seeds ==
1. (United States) Scott Lipsky / (United States) David Martin (champions)
2. (United States) Brian Battistone / (United States) Dann Battistone (first round)
3. (Paraguay) Ramón Delgado / (United States) Todd Widom (first round)
4. (India) Harsh Mankad / (India) Purav Raja (semifinals)

== Draw ==
=== Key ===
- Q = Qualifier
- WC = Wild card
- LL = Lucky loser
- Alt = Alternate
- SE = Special exempt
- PR = Protected ranking
- ITF = ITF entry
- JE = Junior exempt
- w/o = Walkover
- r = Retired
- d = Defaulted
- SR = Special ranking

=== Draw ===
First round
1	(United States) S Lipsky (United States) D Martin	6	5	[10]
(United States) A Kuznetsov (Serbia) V Obradović	4	7	[8]
Q	(South Korea) W-S Jun (Japan) H Kondo	6	7
LL	(United States) P Simmonds (United States) T Smyczek	4	6^{2}
4	(India) H Mankad (India) P Raja	6	3	[10]
(Mexico) S González (Ecuador) G Lapentti	3	6	[7]
(Slovenia) L Gregorc (Italy) A Stoppini	6	7
WC	(United States) T Rettenmaier (United States) Brett Ross	2	6^{4}
(United States) B Evans (United States) J Levine	6	7
(India) S Devvarman (India) A Singh	3	5
(United States) K Kim (South Korea) H-t Lee	6	6
3	(Paraguay) R Delgado (United States) T Widom	4	0
(India) P Amritraj (United States) S Jenkins	4	6^{4}
WC	(United States) Rylan Rizza (United States) K Van't Hof	6	7
WC	(United States) L Cook (United States) D Young	6	6
2	(United States) B Battistone (United States) D Battistone	1	3

Quarterfinals
1	(United States) S Lipsky (United States) D Martin	6	6
Q	(South Korea) W-S Jun (Japan) H Kondo	3	3
4	(India) H Mankad (India) P Raja	6	6
(Slovenia) L Gregorc (Italy) A Stoppini	4	3
(United States) B Evans (United States) J Levine	6	6
(United States) K Kim (South Korea) H-t Lee	1	2
WC	(United States) R Rizza (United States) K Van't Hof	6	3	[9]
WC	(United States) L Cook (United States) D Young	4	6	[11]

Semifinals
1	(United States) S Lipsky (United States) D Martin	6	6
4	(India) H Mankad (India) P Raja	1	4
(United States) B Evans (United States) J Levine	5	5
WC	(United States) L Cook (United States) D Young	7	7

Finals
1	(United States) S Lipsky (United States) D Martin	7	4	[10]
WC	(United States) L Cook (United States) D Young	6^{3}	6	[6]
