= 2009 Home Depot Center USTA Challenger – Singles =

Singles
- 2009 Home Depot Center USTA Challenger

Final
- Champion: (United States) Wayne Odesnik
- Runner-up: (United States) Scoville Jenkins
- Score: 6–4, 6–4

Events
Singles	Doubles
← 2008 ·	Home Depot Center USTA Challenger	· 2010 →

Amer Delic was the defending champion, but he chose not to compete this year.
Wayne Odesnik won in the final 6–4, 6–4, against Scoville Jenkins.

== Seeds ==
1. (United States) Vince Spadea (semifinals)
2. (United States) Kevin Kim (semifinals)
3. (South Korea) Lee Hyung-taik (second round)
4. (United States) Wayne Odesnik (champion)
5. (United States) Jesse Levine (quarterfinals)
6. (Canada) Frank Dancevic (first round)
7. (United States) Donald Young (quarterfinals)
8. (India) Somdev Devvarman (first round)

== Draw ==
=== Key ===
- Q = Qualifier
- WC = Wild card
- LL = Lucky loser
- Alt = Alternate
- SE = Special exempt
- PR = Protected ranking
- ITF = ITF entry
- JE = Junior exempt
- w/o = Walkover
- r = Retired
- d = Defaulted
- SR = Special ranking

=== Final four ===
Semifinals
1	(United States) Vince Spadea	2	3
4	(United States) Wayne Odesnik	6	6
(United States) Scoville Jenkins	6	6
2	(United States) Kevin Kim	4	3

Final
4	(United States) Wayne Odesnik	6	6
(United States) Scoville Jenkins	4	4

=== Top half ===
First round
1	(United States) V Spadea	6^{4}	7	6
(United States) T Widom	7	5	4
(Canada) P Polansky	2	6	6
(Italy) A Stoppini	6	1	4
(United States) R Ram	6^{3}	5
WC	(United States) T Smyczek	7	7
Q	(Russia) A Sitak	2	3
7	(United States) D Young	6	6
4	(United States) W Odesnik	6	6
WC	(United States) A Kuznetsov	4	3
(India) P Amritraj	7	6
WC	(United States) L Cook	6^{3}	3
(United States) R Sweeting	6	7
(Mexico) S González	2	6^{5}
Q	(United States) T Rettenmaier	1	3
5	(United States) J Levine	6	6

Second round
1	(United States) V Spadea	7	6
(Canada) P Polansky	6^{1}	2
WC	(United States) T Smyczek	3	0
7	(United States) D Young	6	6
4	(United States) W Odesnik	6	6
(India) P Amritraj	2	4
(United States) R Sweeting	2	5
5	(United States) J Levine	6	7

Quarterfinals
1	(United States) V Spadea	6	6
7	(United States) D Young	3	1
4	(United States) W Odesnik	7	6^{4}	6
5	(United States) J Levine	6^{6}	7	4

Semifinals
1	(United States) V Spadea	2	3
4	(United States) W Odesnik	6	6

=== Bottom half ===
First round
8	(India) S Devvarman	1	4
(United States) S Jenkins	6	6
(Ecuador) G Lapentti	6	6
WC	(United States) M McClune	4	4
Q	(Philippines) C Mamiit	6	6
(United States) M Russell	3	3
(United States) B Evans	4	5
3	(South Korea) H-t Lee	6	7
6	(Canada) F Dancevic	4	1
(Paraguay) R Delgado	6	6
(United States) M Yani	4	6	4
(South Korea) W-S Jun	6	3	6
(Canada) F Niemeyer	7	6^{2}	4
(Slovenia) L Gregorc	6^{4}	7	6
Q	(United States) K Van't Hof	1	6^{7}
2	(United States) K Kim	6	7

Second round
(United States) S Jenkins	6^{7}	7	7
(Ecuador) G Lapentti	7	5	6^{1}
Q	(Philippines) C Mamiit	6	6
3	(South Korea) H-t Lee	4	4
(Paraguay) R Delgado	6	3
(South Korea) W-S Jun	1	0	r
(Slovenia) L Gregorc	4	7	2
2	(United States) K Kim	6	5	6

Quarterfinals
(United States) S Jenkins	6	6
Q	(Philippines) C Mamiit	3	4
(Paraguay) R Delgado	3	6	2
2	(United States) K Kim	6	4	6

Semifinals
(United States) S Jenkins	6	6
2	(United States) K Kim	4	3

== Sources ==
- Main Draw
