= 2009 USTA LA Tennis Open – Doubles =

Doubles
- 2009 USTA LA Tennis Open

Final
- Champions: (India) Harsh Mankad (Denmark) Frederik Nielsen
- Runners-up: (Australia) Carsten Ball (United States) Travis Rettenmaier
- Score: 6–4, 6–4

Events
Singles	Doubles
← 2008 ·	USTA LA Tennis Open	· 2010 →

Scott Lipsky and David Martin won the doubles competition in January 2009 and were the defending champions, but chose not to participate.
Harsh Mankad and Frederik Nielsen defeated 6–4, 6–4 Carsten Ball and Travis Rettenmaier in the final.

== Seeds ==
1. (Thailand) Sanchai Ratiwatana / (Thailand) Sonchat Ratiwatana (quarterfinals)
2. (Australia) Carsten Ball / (United States) Travis Rettenmaier (final)
3. (United States) Todd Widom / (United States) Michael Yani (semifinals)
4. (United States) Brian Battistone / (United States) Nicholas Monroe (quarterfinals)

== Draw ==
=== Key ===
- Q = Qualifier
- WC = Wild card
- LL = Lucky loser
- Alt = Alternate
- SE = Special exempt
- PR = Protected ranking
- ITF = ITF entry
- JE = Junior exempt
- w/o = Walkover
- r = Retired
- d = Defaulted
- SR = Special ranking

=== Draw ===
First round
1	(Thailand) Sa Ratiwatana (Thailand) So Ratiwatana	6	6
(United States) A Kuznetsov (Sweden) M Ryderstedt	2	4
Q	(New Zealand) GD Jones (United States) S Oudsema	7	7
(United States) A Bogomolov Jr. (United States) E Nunez	5	6^{5}
4	(United States) B Battistone (United States) N Monroe	6	6
WC	(United States) D Kosakowski (United States) JT Sundling	1	3
WC	(United States) L Cook (United States) J Witten	6	6^{5}	[6]
(India) H Mankad (Denmark) F Nielsen	1	7	[10]
WC	(United States) S Bass (United States) T Paul	2	3
(Paraguay) R Delgado (United States) K Van't Hof	6	6
(Chinese Taipei) T Chen (Thailand) D Udomchoke	4	1
3	(United States) T Widom (United States) M Yani	6	6
(Japan) T Suzuki (United States) J Thomas	1	7	[6]
(Australia) A Feeney (Netherlands) I Sijsling	6	6^{4}	[10]
LL	(Latvia) A Juška (Latvia) D Pavlovs	5	6^{4}
2	(Australia) C Ball (Australia) T Rettenmaier	7	7

Quarterfinals
1	(Thailand) Sa Ratiwatana (Thailand) So Ratiwatana	3	6^{4}
Q	(New Zealand) GD Jones (United States) S Oudsema	6	7
4	(United States) B Battistone (United States) N Monroe	2	3
(India) H Mankad (Denmark) F Nielsen	6	6
(Paraguay) R Delgado (United States) K Van't Hof	3	4
3	(United States) T Widom (United States) M Yani	6	6
(Australia) A Feeney (Netherlands) I Sijsling	4	2
2	(Australia) C Ball (Australia) T Rettenmaier	6	6

Semifinals
Q	(New Zealand) GD Jones (United States) S Oudsema	3	6	[2]
(India) H Mankad (Denmark) F Nielsen	6	1	[10]
3	(United States) T Widom (United States) M Yani	0	6^{4}
2	(Australia) C Ball (Australia) T Rettenmaier	6	7

Finals
(India) H Mankad (Denmark) F Nielsen	6	6
2	(Australia) C Ball (Australia) T Rettenmaier	4	4
