= 2009 USTA LA Tennis Open – Singles =

Singles
- 2009 USTA LA Tennis Open

Final
- Champion: (United States) Michael Russell
- Runner-up: (United States) Michael Yani
- Score: 6–1, 6–1

Events
Singles	Doubles
← 2008 ·	USTA LA Tennis Open	· 2010 →

Wayne Odesnik won the singles competition in January 2009 and he was the defending champion, but did not take part in these championships this time.
Michael Russell won in the final 6–1, 6–1, against Michael Yani.

== Seeds ==
1. (United States) Vince Spadea (first round)
2. (Thailand) Danai Udomchoke (quarterfinals)
3. (United States) Alex Bogomolov Jr. (first round)
4. (United States) Donald Young (first round)
5. (United States) Michael Russell (champion)
6. (United States) Sam Warburg (second round)
7. (Australia) Carsten Ball (first round)
8. (Sweden) Björn Rehnquist (first round)

== Draw ==
Key

- Q = Qualifier
- WC = Wild card
- LL = Lucky loser
- Alt = Alternate
- ITF = ITF entry
- PR = Protected ranking
- SR = Special ranking
- SE = Special exempt
- JE = Junior exempt
- JR = Junior Accelerator Programme entrant
- CO = College Accelerator Programme entrant
- NG = Next Gen Accelerator Program entrant
- w/o = Walkover
- r = Retired
- d = Defaulted

=== Final four ===
Semifinals
(Sweden) Michael Ryderstedt	7	5	3
(United States) Michael Yani	6^{5}	7	6
5	(United States) Michael Russell	6	7
(United States) Lester Cook	2	6^{7}

Final
(United States) Michael Yani	1	1
5	(United States) Michael Russell	6	6

=== Top half ===
First round
1	(United States) V Spadea	4	3
(Sweden) M Ryderstedt	6	6
Q	(Netherlands) I Sijsling	6	6
(Denmark) F Nielsen	4	0
(Latvia) A Juška	6	7
(United States) R DeHeart	4	6^{5}
(South Africa) F Wolmarans	6	6
8	(Sweden) B Rehnquist	4	3
4/WC	(United States) D Young	4	1
(Australia) N Lindahl	6	6
Q	(Israel) A Weintraub	1	0
(Latvia) D Pavlovs	6	6
(Paraguay) R Delgado	6^{5}	3
(United States) M Yani	7	6
(United States) E Nunez	1	2
6	(United States) S Warburg	6	6

Second round
(Sweden) M Ryderstedt	7	6
Q	(Netherlands) I Sijsling	5	1
(Latvia) A Juška	6^{5}	0
(South Africa) F Wolmarans	7	6
(Australia) N Lindahl	6	6
(Latvia) D Pavlovs	3	1
(United States) M Yani	7	6
6	(United States) S Warburg	6^{4}	1

Quarterfinals
(Sweden) M Ryderstedt	6	6
(South Africa) F Wolmarans	1	3
(Australia) N Lindahl	2	4
(United States) M Yani	6	6

Semifinals
(Sweden) M Ryderstedt	7	5	3
(United States) M Yani	6^{7}	7	6

=== Bottom half ===
First round
5	(United States) M Russell	3	6	6
(United States) T Widom	6	3	3
WC	(United States) K Van't Hof	2	4
WC	(United States) M McClune	6	6
Q	(United States) J Witten	6	1	6
Q	(United States) S Oudsema	4	6	3
(United States) N Monroe	6	4	6
3	(United States) A Bogomolov Jr.	3	6	4
7	(Australia) C Ball	6^{7}	3
LL	(Uruguay) M Felder	7	6
(United States) L Cook	6	6
(France) D Guez	4	4
WC	(United States) A Kuznetsov	4	6
(United States) S Bass	6	0	r
(Republic of Ireland) C Niland	3	3
2	(Thailand) D Udomchoke	6	6

Second round
5	(United States) M Russell	5	6	7
WC	(United States) M McClune	7	4	6^{9}
Q	(United States) J Witten	7	7
(United States) N Monroe	6^{6}	6^{3}
LL	(Uruguay) M Felder	2	1
(United States) L Cook	6	6
WC	(United States) A Kuznetsov	2	2
2	(Thailand) D Udomchoke	6	6

Quarterfinals
5	(United States) M Russell	6	6
Q	(United States) J Witten	1	4
(United States) L Cook	6	6
2	(Thailand) D Udomchoke	3	4

Semifinals
5	(United States) M Russell	6	7
(United States) L Cook	2	6^{7}
