= 2010 USTA LA Tennis Open – Doubles =

Doubles
- 2010 USTA LA Tennis Open

Final
- Champions: (United States) Brian Battistone (United States) Nicholas Monroe
- Runners-up: (Russia) Artem Sitak (Portugal) Leonardo Tavares
- Score: 5–7, 6–3, [10–4]

Events
Singles	Doubles
← 2009 ·	USTA LA Tennis Open

Harsh Mankad and Frederik Nielsen were the defending champions, but Nielsen chose not to compete this year.
Mankad partnered up with Samuel Groth, but they lost in the semifinals against Brian Battistone and Nicholas Monroe.
Battistone and Monroe won in the final 5–7, 6–3, [10–4] against Artem Sitak and Leonardo Tavares.

== Seeds ==
1. (Argentina) Brian Dabul / (Brazil) Franco Ferreiro (withdrew)
2. (United States) Lester Cook / (United States) David Martin (semifinals)
3. (Philippines) Treat Conrad Huey / (South Africa) Izak van der Merwe (quarterfinals)
4. (Australia) Samuel Groth / (India) Harsh Mankad (semifinals)

== Draw ==
=== Key ===
- Q = Qualifier
- WC = Wild card
- LL = Lucky loser
- Alt = Alternate
- SE = Special exempt
- PR = Protected ranking
- ITF = ITF entry
- JE = Junior exempt
- w/o = Walkover
- r = Retired
- d = Defaulted
- SR = Special ranking

=== Draw ===
First round
LL	(United States) B Battistone (United States) N Monroe	6	6
(Chile) P Capdeville (United States) R Rizza	3	2
WC	(United States) G Ouellette (United States) D Young	3	7	[10]
WC	(United States) B Strode (United States) M Venus	6	5	[7]
4	(Australia) S Groth (India) H Mankad	6	7
WC	(United States) M Giron (United States) D Kosakowski	3	6^{4}
Q	(United States) C Parr (United States) T Paul	4	4
(United States) B Joelson (United States) T Smyczek	6	6
(United States) R Kendrick (United States) B Reynolds	7	3	[7]
(Russia) A Sitak (Portugal) L Tavares	6^{5}	6	[10]
(Slovenia) L Gregorc (United States) A Kuznetsov	1	3
3	(Philippines) TC Huey (South Africa) I van der Merwe	6	6
(Germany) D Gremelmayr (United States) K Kim	6^{6}	1
PR	(Sweden) M Ryderstedt (Sweden) A Siljeström	7	6
(Canada) P Polansky (Canada) M Raonic	7	3	[7]
2	(United States) L Cook (United States) D Martin	6^{1}	6	[10]

Quarterfinals
LL	(United States) B Battistone (United States) N Monroe	6	6
WC	(United States) G Ouellette (United States) D Young	3	0
4	(Australia) S Groth (India) H Mankad	6	6
(United States) B Joelson (United States) T Smyczek	3	4
(Russia) A Sitak (Portugal) L Tavares	7	7
3	(Philippines) TC Huey (South Africa) I van der Merwe	5	6^{3}
PR	(Sweden) M Ryderstedt (Sweden) A Siljeström	1	0
2	(United States) L Cook (United States) D Martin	6	6

Semifinals
LL	(United States) B Battistone (United States) N Monroe	6	4	[11]
4	(Australia) S Groth (India) H Mankad	3	6	[9]
(Russia) A Sitak (Portugal) L Tavares	6	6
2	(United States) L Cook (United States) D Martin	2	2

Finals
LL	(United States) B Battistone (United States) N Monroe	5	6	[10]
(Russia) A Sitak (Portugal) L Tavares	7	3	[4]
