= 2009 USTA LA Tennis Open =

- Date: May 23 – May 31
- Edition: 5th
- Location: Carson, California, United States

Champions

Singles
- (United States) Michael Russell

Doubles
- (India) Harsh Mankad / (Denmark) Frederik Nielsen
← 2008 ·	USTA LA Tennis Open	· 2010 →

The 2009 USTA LA Tennis Open was a professional tennis tournament played on outdoor hard courts. It was part of the 2009 ATP Challenger Tour. It took place in Carson, California, United States between May 23–31, 2009.

== Singles entrants ==
=== Seeds ===
Nationality	Player	Ranking*	Seeding
USA	Vince Spadea	106	1
THA	Danai Udomchoke	124	2
USA	Alex Bogomolov Jr.	157	3
USA	Donald Young	164	4
USA	Michael Russell	168	5
USA	Sam Warburg	195	6
AUS	Carsten Ball	200	7
SWE	Björn Rehnquist	202	8

- Rankings are as of May 18, 2009.

=== Other entrants ===
The following players received wildcards into the singles main draw:

- (United States) Alex Kuznetsov
- (United States) Michael McClune
- (United States) Kaes Van't Hof
- (United States) Donald Young

The following players received entry from the qualifying draw:

- (United States) Scott Oudsema
- (Netherlands) Igor Sijsling
- (Israel) Amir Weintraub
- (United States) Jesse Witten
- (Argentina) Marcel Felder (as a Lucky loser)

== Champions ==
=== Men's singles ===
(United States) Michael Russell def. (United States) Michael Yani, 6–1, 6–1

=== Men's doubles ===
(India) Harsh Mankad / (Denmark) Frederik Nielsen def. (Australia) Carsten Ball / (United States) Travis Rettenmaier, 6–4, 6–4
