= 2009 LA Tennis Open USTA Men's Challenger =

2009 LA Tennis Open USTA Men's Challenger may refer to:

- 2009 Home Depot Center USTA Challenger, part one of the event
- 2009 USTA LA Tennis Open, part two of the event
