= 2010 USTA LA Tennis Open =

- Date: May 24 – May 30
- Edition: 6th
- Surface: Hard
- Location: Carson, United States

Champions

Singles
- (United States) Donald Young

Doubles
- (United States) Brian Battistone / (United States) Nicholas Monroe
- USTA LA Tennis Open

The 2010 USTA LA Tennis Open was a professional tennis tournament played on outdoor hard courts. It was part of the 2010 ATP Challenger Tour. It took place in Carson, United States between May 24 and May 30, 2010.

== ATP entrants ==
=== Seeds ===
| Nationality | Player | Ranking* | Seeding |
|---|---|---|---|
| USA | Jesse Levine | 112 | 1 |
| ARG | Brian Dabul | 124 | 2 |
| USA | Kevin Kim | 141 | 3 |
| USA | Donald Young | 149 | 4 |
| USA | Robert Kendrick | 157 | 5 |
| USA | Alex Kuznetsov | 180 | 6 |
| AUS | Nick Lindahl | 187 | 7 |
| CAN | Peter Polansky | 192 | 8 |

- Rankings are as of May 17, 2010.

=== Other entrants ===
The following players received wildcards into the singles main draw:

- (United Kingdom) Jamie Baker
- (United States) Marcos Giron
- (United States) Greg Ouellette
- (United States) Daniel Kosakowski

The following players received entry into the singles main draw with a protected ranking:

- (United States) Bobby Reynolds

The following players received entry into the singles main draw as an alternative:

- (Canada) Milos Raonic

The following players received entry from the qualifying draw:

- (South Korea) Jun Woong-Sun
- (Philippines) Cecil Mamiit
- (United States) Eric Nunez
- (Sweden) Michael Ryderstedt

The following player received the lucky loser spot:

- (Australia) Dayne Kelly

== Champions ==
=== Singles ===
(United States) Donald Young def. (United States) Robert Kendrick, 6–4, 6–4

=== Doubles ===
(United States) Brian Battistone / (United States) Nicholas Monroe def. (Russia) Artem Sitak / (Portugal) Leonardo Tavares, 5–7, 6–3, [10–4]
