= Ford Tennis Championships =

Defunct tennis tournament
- Location: Louisville, Kentucky
- Venue: Louisville Tennis Club
- Category: ATP Challenger Series
- Surface: Hard / Indoors
- Draw: 32S/16Q/16D
- Prize money: $50,000
- Website: Official website

The Ford Tennis Championships was a tennis tournament held annually in Louisville, Kentucky from 2006 to 2008. The event was part of the Challenger series and was played on indoor hardcourts.

== Past finals ==
=== Singles ===
Year	Champion	Runner-up	Score	Ref.
2006	(United States) Amer Delic	(Switzerland) Stéphane Bohli	3–6, 6–2, 6–3	
2007	(Germany) Matthias Bachinger	(United States) Donald Young	0–6, 7–5, 6–3	
2008	(United States) Robert Kendrick	(United States) Donald Young	6–1, 6–1	

=== Doubles ===
Year	Champion	Runner-up	Score	Ref.
2006	(Netherlands) Robin Haase (Netherlands) Igor Sijsling	(United States) Amer Delic (United States) Robert Kendrick	W/O	
2007	(United States) John Isner (United States) Travis Parrott	(United Kingdom) Richard Bloomfield (Sweden) Michael Ryderstedt	6–4, 6–4	
2008	(India) Prakash Amritraj (United States) Jesse Levine	(Canada) Frank Dancevic (Serbia) Dušan Vemić	6–3, 7–6	
