= 2010 USTA LA Tennis Open – Singles =

Singles
- 2010 USTA LA Tennis Open

Final
- Champion: (United States) Donald Young
- Runner-up: (United States) Robert Kendrick
- Score: 6–4, 6–4

Events
Singles	Doubles
- USTA LA Tennis Open

Michael Russell was the defending champion, but he chose to compete at the French Open instead.
Donald Young defeated 6–4, 6–4 Robert Kendrick in the final.

== Seeds ==
1. (United States) Jesse Levine (second round)
2. (Argentina) Brian Dabul (second round)
3. (United States) Kevin Kim (first round)
4. (United States) Donald Young (champion)
5. (United States) Robert Kendrick (final)
6. (United States) Alex Kuznetsov (quarterfinals)
7. (Australia) Nick Lindahl (second round)
8. (Canada) Peter Polansky (semifinals)

== Draw ==
Key

- Q = Qualifier
- WC = Wild card
- LL = Lucky loser
- Alt = Alternate
- ITF = ITF entry
- PR = Protected ranking
- SR = Special ranking
- SE = Special exempt
- JE = Junior exempt
- JR = Junior Accelerator Programme entrant
- CO = College Accelerator Programme entrant
- NG = Next Gen Accelerator Program entrant
- w/o = Walkover
- r = Retired
- d = Defaulted

=== Finals ===
Semifinals
5	(United States) Robert Kendrick	7	6
8	(Canada) Peter Polansky	6^{1}	3
4	(United States) Donald Young	3	6	6
(United States) Lester Cook	6	1	1

Final
5	(United States) Robert Kendrick	4	4
4	(United States) Donald Young	6	6

=== Top half ===
First round
1	(United States) J Levine	4	6	6
(Slovenia) L Gregorc	6	1	3
(South Africa) I van der Merwe	7	3	3
(Australia) M Matosevic	6^{5}	6	6
(Dominican Republic) V Estrella	7	1	6
(New Zealand) J Statham	5	6	4
Q	(South Korea) W-S Jun	4	3
5	(United States) R Kendrick	6	6
3	(United States) K Kim	7	1	0
LL	(Australia) D Kelly	6^{5}	6	6
(Russia) A Sitak	6^{3}	1
(Australia) S Groth	7	6
Q	(Philippines) C Mamiit	4	7	3
WC	(United Kingdom) J Baker	6	6^{2}	6
WC	(United States) M Giron	1	5
8	(Canada) P Polansky	6	7

Second round
1	(United States) J Levine	3	4
(Australia) M Matosevic	6	6
(Dominican Republic) V Estrella	6^{5}	1
5	(United States) R Kendrick	7	6
LL	(Australia) D Kelly	6^{2}	6	7
(Australia) S Groth	7	4	6^{4}
WC	(United Kingdom) J Baker	6	1	4
8	(Canada) P Polansky	4	6	6

Quarterfinals
(Australia) M Matosevic	2	6^{9}
5	(United States) R Kendrick	6	7
LL	(Australia) D Kelly	4	4
8	(Canada) P Polansky	6	6

Semifinals
5	(United States) R Kendrick	7	6
8	(Canada) P Polansky	6^{1}	3

=== Bottom half ===
First round
7	(Australia) N Lindahl	3	7	7
ALT	(Canada) M Raonic	6	6^{5}	6^{5}
(Portugal) L Tavares	4	1
(United States) T Smyczek	6	6
WC	(United States) G Ouellette	4	3
PR	(United States) B Reynolds	6	6
WC	(United States) D Kosakowski	1	1
4	(United States) D Young	6	6
6	(United States) A Kuznetsov	7	6
(Japan) T Suzuki	5	2
Q	(United States) E Nunez	1	7	6
(Germany) D Gremelmayr	6	6^{2}	4
(Chile) P Capdeville	6	2	6^{4}
(United States) L Cook	2	6	7
Q	(Sweden) M Ryderstedt	3	5
2	(Argentina) B Dabul	6	7

Second round
7	(Australia) N Lindahl	7	4	1
(United States) T Smyczek	5	6	6
PR	(United States) B Reynolds	2	4
4	(United States) D Young	6	6
6	(United States) A Kuznetsov	6	6
Q	(United States) E Nunez	0	1
(United States) L Cook	7	6
2	(Argentina) B Dabul	6^{2}	4

Quarterfinals
(United States) T Smyczek	1	7	2
4	(United States) D Young	6	6^{4}	6
6	(United States) A Kuznetsov	4	6	4
(United States) L Cook	6	0	6

Semifinals
4	(United States) D Young	3	6	6
(United States) L Cook	6	1	1
