= 2011 Shanghai Rolex Masters – Singles =

Singles
- 2011 Shanghai Rolex Masters

Final
- Champion: (United Kingdom) Andy Murray
- Runner-up: (Spain) David Ferrer
- Score: 7–5, 6–4

Events
Singles	Doubles
← 2010 ·	Shanghai Masters	· 2012 →

Defending champion Andy Murray defeated David Ferrer in the final, 7–5, 6–4 to win the singles tennis title at the 2011 Shanghai Masters.

== Seeds ==
The top eight seeds receive a bye into the second round.

1. (Spain) Rafael Nadal (third round)
2. (United Kingdom) Andy Murray (champion)
3. (Spain) David Ferrer (final)
4. (France) Jo-Wilfried Tsonga (second round)
5. (United States) Mardy Fish (second round)
6. (Czech Republic) Tomáš Berdych (third round)
7. (Spain) Nicolás Almagro (third round)
8. (France) Gilles Simon (third round)
9. (Serbia) Janko Tipsarević (first round)
10. (United States) Andy Roddick (quarterfinals)
11. (Serbia) Viktor Troicki (first round)
12. (Ukraine) Alexandr Dolgopolov (quarterfinals)
13. (Switzerland) Stanislas Wawrinka (third round)
14. (Austria) Jürgen Melzer (second round)
15. (Germany) Florian Mayer (quarterfinals)
16. (Spain) Fernando Verdasco (second round)

== Draw ==
=== Key ===
- Q = Qualifier
- WC = Wild card
- LL = Lucky loser
- Alt = Alternate
- SE = Special exempt
- PR = Protected ranking
- ITF = ITF entry
- JE = Junior exempt
- w/o = Walkover
- r = Retired
- d = Defaulted
- SR = Special ranking

=== Finals ===
Quarterfinals
15	(Germany) Florian Mayer	2	4
(Spain) Feliciano López	6	6
3	(Spain) David Ferrer	6^{5}	6	7^{7}
10	(United States) Andy Roddick	7^{7}	2	6^{2}
12	(Ukraine) Alexandr Dolgopolov	4	3
(Japan) Kei Nishikori	6	6
Q	(Australia) Matthew Ebden	3	2
2	(United Kingdom) Andy Murray	6	6

Semifinals
(Spain) Feliciano López	7^{7}	3	3
3	(Spain) David Ferrer	6^{5}	6	6
(Japan) Kei Nishikori	3	0
2	(United Kingdom) Andy Murray	6	6

Final
3	(Spain) David Ferrer	5	4
2	(United Kingdom) Andy Murray	7	6

=== Top half ===
==== Section 1 ====
First round
(Spain) G García López	6	6
(India) S Devvarman	4	3
(Latvia) E Gulbis	5	4
WC	(Argentina) D Nalbandian	7	6
(Italy) F Fognini	0	2
15	(Germany) F Mayer	6	6
9	(Serbia) J Tipsarević	6^{2}	6^{3}
(Spain) F López	7^{7}	7^{7}
(United States) A Bogomolov Jr.	6	6
(Spain) M Granollers	2	3
WC	(China) Z Zhang	3	3
(Czech Republic) R Štěpánek	6	6

Second round
1	(Spain) R Nadal	6	6
(Spain) G García López	3	2
WC	(Argentina) D Nalbandian	3	4
15	(Germany) F Mayer	6	6
(Spain) F López	7^{7}	3	6
(United States) A Bogomolov Jr.	6^{4}	6	3
(Czech Republic) R Štěpánek	4	3
6	(Czech Republic) T Berdych	6	6

Third round
1	(Spain) R Nadal	6^{5}	3
15	(Germany) F Mayer	7^{7}	6
(Spain) F López	6	6
6	(Czech Republic) T Berdych	4	4

Quarterfinals
15	(Germany) F Mayer	2	4
(Spain) F López	6	6

==== Section 2 ====
First round
(Canada) M Raonic	6^{2}	6	7^{7}
(France) M Llodra	7^{7}	2	6^{5}
(Russia) M Youzhny	6^{4}	4
(Spain) JC Ferrero	7^{7}	6
WC	(China) Z Li	2	2
16	(Spain) F Verdasco	6	6
10	(United States) A Roddick	6	3	6
Q	(Chinese Taipei) Y-h Lu	2	6	2
Q	(Turkey) M İlhan	6	1	4
(Bulgaria) G Dimitrov	2	6	6
Q	(Switzerland) S Bohli	6^{3}	6^{4}
(Spain) T Robredo	7^{7}	7^{7}

Second round
3	(Spain) D Ferrer	7	7^{9}
(Canada) M Raonic	5	6^{7}
(Spain) JC Ferrero	4	6	6
16	(Spain) F Verdasco	6	3	2
10	(United States) A Roddick	7^{7}	7
(Bulgaria) G Dimitrov	6^{3}	5
(Spain) T Robredo	5	3
7	(Spain) N Almagro	7	6

Third round
3	(Spain) D Ferrer	1	7	6
(Spain) JC Ferrero	6	5	2
10	(United States) A Roddick	6	6
7	(Spain) N Almagro	3	4

Quarterfinals
3	(Spain) D Ferrer	6^{5}	6	7^{7}
10	(United States) A Roddick	7^{7}	2	6^{2}

=== Bottom half ===
==== Section 3 ====
First round
(South Africa) K Anderson	6^{5}	7^{7}	3
(Australia) B Tomic	7^{7}	6^{4}	6
Q	(Spain) A Ramos	6	6
(Croatia) M Čilić	3	4
(Poland) Ł Kubot	4	6^{6}
12	(Ukraine) A Dolgopolov	6	7^{8}
14	(Austria) J Melzer	6	6
(Croatia) I Ljubičić	4	2
(Croatia) I Dodig	6	3	4
(Colombia) S Giraldo	1	6	6
(Netherlands) R Haase	6	5	6^{5}
(Japan) K Nishikori	0	7	7^{7}

Second round
5	(United States) M Fish	6	1	4
(Australia) B Tomic	4	6	6
Q	(Spain) A Ramos	7	3	2
12	(Ukraine) A Dolgopolov	5	6	6
14	(Austria) J Melzer	6	4	6^{5}
(Colombia) S Giraldo	4	6	7^{7}
(Japan) K Nishikori	6^{1}	6	6
4	(France) J-W Tsonga	7^{7}	4	4

Third round
(Australia) B Tomic	7	1	0
12	(Ukraine) A Dolgopolov	5	6	6
(Colombia) S Giraldo	6^{6}	6	3
(Japan) K Nishikori	7^{8}	4	6

Quarterfinals
12	(Ukraine) A Dolgopolov	4	3
(Japan) K Nishikori	6	6

==== Section 4 ====
First round
(Kazakhstan) M Kukushkin	2	7	6^{5}
(Spain) A Montañés	6	5	7^{7}
(Spain) P Andújar	4	4
Q	(Australia) M Ebden	6	6
Q	(United States) R Harrison	6	6
11	(Serbia) V Troicki	3	3
13	(Switzerland) S Wawrinka	3	6	6
(Argentina) J Mónaco	6	3	3
WC	(China) M Gong	1	4
Q	(United States) D Young	6	6
(Brazil) T Bellucci	7^{7}	4	5
(Russia) D Tursunov	6^{5}	6	7

Second round
8	(France) G Simon	6	6
(Spain) A Montañés	1	1
Q	(Australia) M Ebden	6	6
Q	(United States) R Harrison	4	2
13	(Switzerland) S Wawrinka	6^{5}	7^{7}	6
Q	(United States) D Young	7^{7}	6^{2}	2
(Russia) D Tursunov
2	(United Kingdom) A Murray	w/o

Third round
8	(France) G Simon	2	6	6^{8}
Q	(Australia) M Ebden	6	2	7^{10}
13	(Switzerland) S Wawrinka	4	6	3
2	(United Kingdom) A Murray	6	3	6

Quarterfinals
Q	(Australia) M Ebden	3	2
2	(United Kingdom) A Murray	6	6

== Qualifying rounds ==
=== Seeds ===
1. (United States) Donald Young (qualified)
2. (Germany) Philipp Petzschner (qualifying competition)
3. (Chinese Taipei) Lu Yen-hsun (qualified)
4. (Spain) Albert Ramos (qualified)
5. (United States) Ryan Harrison (qualified)
6. (Italy) Flavio Cipolla (qualifying competition)
7. (Chile) Paul Capdeville (first round)
8. (Turkey) Marsel İlhan (qualified)
9. (Slovenia) Grega Žemlja (first round)
10. (Japan) Go Soeda (first round)
11. (South Africa) Rik de Voest (qualifying competition)
12. (Russia) Teymuraz Gabashvili (qualifying competition)
13. (Italy) Simone Bolelli (qualifying competition)
14. (Australia) Matthew Ebden (qualified)

=== Qualifiers ===
1. (United States) Donald Young
2. (Australia) Matthew Ebden
3. (Chinese Taipei) Lu Yen-hsun
4. (Spain) Albert Ramos
5. (United States) Ryan Harrison
6. (Turkey) Marsel İlhan
7. (Switzerland) Stéphane Bohli

=== Qualifying draw ===
==== First qualifier ====
First round
1	(United States) Donald Young	7^{7}	6
(United States) Michael Yani	6^{2}	4
(Germany) Mischa Zverev	6	5	6
10	(Japan) Go Soeda	3	7	4

Qualifying competition
1	(United States) Donald Young	6	6
(Germany) Mischa Zverev	3	4

==== Second qualifier ====
First round
2	(Germany) Philipp Petzschner	6	6
(Russia) Alexander Kudryavtsev	4	2
(France) Florent Serra	4	2
14	(Australia) Matthew Ebden	6	6

Qualifying competition
2	(Germany) Philipp Petzschner	3	1
14	(Australia) Matthew Ebden	6	6

==== Third qualifier ====
First round
3	(Chinese Taipei) Lu Yen-hsun	6	6
(Chinese Taipei) Yang Tsung-hua	3	2
WC	(China) Wang Chuhan	1	1
13	(Italy) Simone Bolelli	6	6

Qualifying competition
3	(Chinese Taipei) Lu Yen-hsun	6	6
13	(Italy) Simone Bolelli	3	4

==== Fourth qualifier ====
First round
4	(Spain) Albert Ramos	6	6
WC	(China) Feng He	3	0
(Poland) Michał Przysiężny	2	2
11	(South Africa) Rik de Voest	6	6

Qualifying competition
4	(Spain) Albert Ramos	6	6
11	(South Africa) Rik de Voest	4	4

==== Fifth qualifier ====
First round
5	(United States) Ryan Harrison	6	6
WC	(China) Wu Di	2	0
WC	(China) Ma Ya-Nan	2	2
12	(Russia) Teymuraz Gabashvili	6	6

Qualifying competition
5	(United States) Ryan Harrison	6	4	7^{7}
12	(Russia) Teymuraz Gabashvili	3	6	6^{3}

==== Sixth qualifier ====
First round
6	(Italy) Flavio Cipolla	6	6
(United States) Rajeev Ram	1	4
(Australia) Marinko Matosevic	3	0
8	(Turkey) Marsel İlhan	6	6

Qualifying competition
6	(Italy) Flavio Cipolla	2	1
8	(Turkey) Marsel İlhan	6	6

==== Seventh qualifier ====
First round
7	(Chile) Paul Capdeville	6	4	6^{3}
(Italy) Stefano Galvani	2	6	7^{7}
(Switzerland) Stéphane Bohli	7	2	7^{7}
9	(Slovenia) Grega Žemlja	5	6	6^{5}

Qualifying competition
(Italy) Stefano Galvani	2	3
(Switzerland) Stéphane Bohli	6	6
