= 2009 Home Depot Center USTA Challenger =

- Date: January 26 – February 2
- Edition: 4th
- Location: Carson, California, United States

Champions

Singles
- (United States) Wayne Odesnik

Doubles
- (United States) Scott Lipsky / (United States) David Martin
← 2008 ·	Home Depot Center USTA Challenger	· 2010 →

The 2009 Home Depot Center USTA Challenger was a professional tennis tournament played on outdoor hard courts. It was part of the 2009 ATP Challenger Tour. It took place in Carson, California, United States between January 26 – February 2, 2009.

== Singles main-draw entrants ==
=== Seeds ===
Nationality	Player	Ranking*	Seeding
USA	Vince Spadea	82	1
USA	Kevin Kim	112	2
KOR	Lee Hyung-taik	113	3
USA	Wayne Odesnik	115	4
USA	Jesse Levine	130	5
CAN	Frank Dancevic	131	6
USA	Donald Young	133	7
IND	Somdev Devvarman	155	8

- Rankings are as of January 19, 2009.

=== Other entrants ===
The following players received wildcards into the singles main draw:

- (United States) Lester Cook
- (United States) Alex Kuznetsov
- (United States) Michael McClune
- (United States) Tim Smyczek

The following players received entry from the qualifying draw:

- (Philippines) Cecil Mamiit
- (United States) Travis Rettenmaier
- (Russia) Artem Sitak
- (United States) Kaes Van't Hof

== Champions ==
=== Men's singles ===
(United States) Wayne Odesnik def. (United States) Scoville Jenkins, 6–4, 6–4

=== Men's doubles ===
(United States) Scott Lipsky / (United States) David Martin def. (United States) Lester Cook / (United States) Donald Young, 7–6(3), 4–6, [10–6]
