= Men's Pro Challenger at Tunica National =

Defunct tennis tournament
- Location: Tunica Resorts, Mississippi
- Venue: Tunica National Tennis Center
- Category: ATP Challenger Series
- Surface: Green Clay / Outdoors
- Draw: 32S/32Q/16D
- Prize money: $50,000
- Website: Official Website

The Men's Pro Challenger at Tunica National was a tennis tournament held in Tunica Resorts, Mississippi from 2005 until 2008. The event was part of the Challenger series and is played on outdoor green clay courts.

== Past finals ==
=== Singles ===
Year	Champion	Runner-up	Score	Ref.
2005	(United States) James Blake	(United States) Brian Baker	6–2, 6-3	
2006	(Argentina) Diego Hartfield	(United States) Mardy Fish	6–4, 6-4	
2007	(Uruguay) Pablo Cuevas	(Argentina) Juan Pablo Brzezicki	6–4, 4–6, 6-3	
2008	(Peru) Iván Miranda	(Australia) Carsten Ball	6–4, 6-4	

=== Doubles ===
Year	Champion	Runner-up	Score
2005	(United States) Michael Russell (Serbia and Montenegro) Dušan Vemić	(Argentina) Juan Pablo Brzezicki (Argentina) Juan Pablo Guzmán	7–6, 6-3
2006	(United States) Jeff Morrison (United States) Bobby Reynolds	(United States) Hugo Armando (Brazil) Ricardo Mello	3–6, 7–6, [11-9]
2007	(United States) Paul Goldstein (United States) Donald Young	(Uruguay) Pablo Cuevas (Argentina) Horacio Zeballos	4–6, 6–1, [10-4]
2008	(Serbia) Vladimir Obradović (South Africa) Izak van der Merwe	(United States) Ryler DeHeart (United States) Todd Widom	7–6, 6-4
