= Vladimir Obradović (tennis) =

Serbian tennis player and coach

- Full name: Vladimir Obradović
- Country (sports): Serbia and Montenegro; Serbia
- Born: 4 February 1981 (age 44); Belgrade, SR Serbia, SFR Yugoslavia
- Height: 1.96 m (6 ft 5 in)
- Turned pro: 1997
- Retired: 2014
- Plays: Right-handed
- Coach: Andy Jackson; Sveta Simic
- Prize money: $71,788

Singles
- Career titles: 0; 1 Futures
- Highest ranking: No. 368 (11 August 2008)

Doubles
- Career titles: 0; 1 Challenger, 4 Futures
- Highest ranking: No. 192 (18 August 2008)

Vladimir Obradović (Serbian Cyrillic: Владимир Обрадовић; born 4 February 1981) is a Serbian tennis coach and former professional tennis player.

== Biography ==
Obradović, a right-handed player with a one handed backhand, trained at Belgrade's Partizan Tennis Club.

In 2002 he featured in a Davis Cup tie for Serbia and Montenegro, against South Africa on his home court in Belgrade. Serbia and Montenegro secured the tie in the first of the reverse singles, which gave Obradović an opportunity to play the final match, a dead rubber he lost to Justin Bower.

He attended the University of Florida and played collegiate tennis before turning professional.

On tour he featured at Futures and Challenger level, as well as the qualifying draws of several ATP Tour tournaments. In 2007 he won his only ITF Futures title on home soil, defeating compatriot Ivan Bjelica. En route to the final he also beat future star Dusan Lajovic. In 2008 he made the semi-finals of the Izmir Challenger and had a win over former French Open finalist Mariano Puerta on clay at the Samarkhand Challenger. His only Challenger title was in doubles, the 2008 edition of the Men's Pro Challenger at Tunica National, which he won partnering Izak Van der Merwe. In 2011 at an ITF Futures event in Alabama, USA, Obradović was the first player to be defeated in a professional event by future top 30 star Yoshihito Nishioka.

== Challenger titles ==
=== Doubles: (1) ===
No.	Year	Tournament	Surface	Partner	Opponents	Score
1.	2008	Tunica Resorts, U.S.	Clay	(South Africa) Izak van der Merwe	(United States) Ryler DeHeart (United States) Todd Widom	7–6^{(5)}, 6–4

== See also ==
- List of Serbia Davis Cup team representatives
