= Travis Rettenmaier =

American tennis player (born 1983)

- Country (sports): United States
- Residence: Los Angeles, United States
- Born: 6 August 1983 (age 43) Tarzana, California, United States
- Height: 188 cm (6 ft 2 in)
- Turned pro: 2002
- Retired: 2012
- Plays: Right-handed (two handed-backhand)
- Prize money: $243,091

Singles
- Career record: 2–2 (at ATP Tour level, Grand Slam level, and in Davis Cup)
- Career titles: 0; 0 Challenger, 2 Futures
- Highest ranking: No. 273 (27 February 2006)

Grand Slam singles results
- Australian Open: Q1 (2006)
- US Open: Q2 (2005)

Doubles
- Career record: 16-28 (at ATP Tour level, Grand Slam level, and in Davis Cup)
- Career titles: 1; 19 Challenger, 8 Futures
- Highest ranking: No. 57 (12 July 2010)

Grand Slam doubles results
- Australian Open: 1R (2010)
- French Open: 3R (2010)
- Wimbledon: 2R (2010)
- US Open: 1R (2005, 2008, 2009, 2010)
- Last updated on: 11 July 2021.

Travis Rettenmaier (born August 6, 1983) is an American former professional tennis player and pickleball player. Rettenmaier's highest singles ranking was World No. 273 achieved on February 27, 2006. In doubles, his ranking was World No. 57, which he achieved on July 12, 2010. He was mainly active as a doubles player.

Rettenmaier in 2022 became the first owner/player of a Major League Pickleball team. As a co-owner of the Florida Smash (www.floridasmash.com) Rettenmaier made the finals of the first event at Dreamland in Dripping Springs, Texas. Rettenmaier played alongside JW Johnson, Lee Whitwell and Maggy Remynse.

Rettenmaier is now a full time professional pickleball player.

== Career ==
Rettenmaier, coached by former touring pro Scott McCain, turned professional in 2002 and retired in 2012.

At 6-foot 2-inches, Rettenmaier was a right-hander. He was 2–2 on the ATP Tour in singles matches, and 16–28 in doubles.

== Personal life ==
Travis is the son of Tom and Karen Rettenmaier, and has one sister named Bettina. He started tennis when he was one, and enjoys hard and grass courts best. Aside from tennis, Rettenmaier enjoys basketball, golf, and ping-pong.

He entered UCLA at age 16 and competed for two years for the UCLA Bruins before turning pro.

Rettenmaier now resides in Saint Petersburg, Florida with his daughter Rowyn.

== ATP career finals ==
=== Doubles: 2 (1 title, 1 runner-up) ===
Legend Grand Slam tournaments (0–0) ATP World Tour Finals (0–0) ATP World Tour Masters 1000 (0–0) ATP World Tour 500 Series (0–0) ATP World Tour 250 Series (1–1)	Finals by surface Hard (0–0) Clay (1–0) Grass (0–1)	Titles by setting Outdoor (1–1) Indoor (0–0)

Result	W–L	Date	Tournament	Tier	Surface	Partner	Opponents	Score
Win	1–0	May 2010	Belgrade, Serbia	250 Series	Clay	(Mexico) Santiago González	(Poland) Tomasz Bednarek (Poland) Mateusz Kowalczyk	7–6^{(8–6)}, 6–1
Loss	1–1	Jul 2010	Newport, United States	250 Series	Grass	(Mexico) Santiago González	(Australia) Carsten Ball (Australia) Chris Guccione	3–6, 4–6

== ATP Challenger and ITF Futures finals ==
=== Singles: 4 (2–2) ===
Legend ATP Challenger (0–1) ITF Futures (2–1)	Finals by surface Hard (2–1) Clay (0–0) Grass (0–1) Carpet (0–0)

Result	W–L	Date	Tournament	Tier	Surface	Opponent	Score
Win	1–0	Mar 2002	USA F5, Harlingen	Futures	Hard	(Australia) Michael Tebbutt	7–5, 6–4
Loss	1–1	Jan 2005	Great Britain F1, Leeds	Futures	Hard	(United Kingdom) Andrew Banks	6–7^{(5–7)}, 6–1, 4–6
Loss	1–2	Jul 2007	Manchester, United Kingdom	Challenger	Grass	(Israel) Harel Levy	2–6, 4–6
Win	2–2	Apr 2008	USA F7, Mobile	Futures	Hard	(United States) Ryler Deheart	6–1, 7–6^{(7–0)}

=== Doubles: 39 (27–12) ===
Legend ATP Challenger (19–6) ITF Futures (8–6)	Finals by surface Hard (19–9) Clay (7–2) Grass (0–1) Carpet (1–0)

Result	W–L	Date	Tournament	Tier	Surface	Partner	Opponents	Score
Win	1–0	Dec 2001	USA F28, Laguna Niguel	Futures	Hard	(United States) Diego Ayala	(Republic of Ireland) John Doran (United States) Nick Rainey	6–0, 7–5
Win	2–0	Jan 2002	USA F2, Delray Beach	Futures	Hard	(United States) Graydon Oliver	(Slovakia) Karol Beck (Slovakia) Ladislav Švarc	6–2, 6–4
Win	3–0	Jan 2002	USA F3, Miami	Futures	Hard	(United States) Graydon Oliver	(Brazil) Pedro Braga (Brazil) Alessandro Guevara	6–7^{(4–7)}, 6–4, 6–4
Win	4–0	Mar 2002	USA F5, Harlingen	Futures	Hard	(United States) Graydon Oliver	(Spain) Esteban Carril (United States) Trace Fielding	6–4, 7–6^{(7–3)}
Loss	4–1	Mar 2003	USA F5, Harlingen	Futures	Hard	(Mexico) Bruno Echagaray	(South Africa) Raven Klaasen (United States) Huntley Montgomery	walkover
Win	5–1	Jun 2003	USA F13, Yuba City	Futures	Hard	(United States) Rylan Rizza	(United States) Marcus Fluitt (United States) Lesley Joseph	6–7^{(3–7)}, 6–4, 6–2
Loss	5–2	Sep 2003	USA F26, Costa Mesa	Futures	Hard	(United States) Robert Yim	(South Africa) Nenad Toroman (United States) Mirko Pehar	6–7^{(6–8)}, 6–2, 3–6
Loss	5–3	Sep 2003	USA F27, Ojai	Futures	Hard	(United States) Robert Yim	(France) Julien Cassaigne (Brazil) Bruno Soares	4–6, 3–6
Loss	5–4	Jun 2004	Forest Hills, United States	Challenger	Grass	(Australia) Michael Tebbutt	(United States) Brandon Coupe (United States) Justin Gimelstob	4–6, 4–6
Loss	5–5	Oct 2004	France F17, Nevers	Futures	Hard	(United States) Eric Butorac	(France) Bertrand Contzler (Algeria) Slimane Saoudi	4–6, 5–7
Win	6–5	Jan 2005	Great Britain F1, Leeds	Futures	Hard	(United States) Eric Butorac	(Denmark) Frederik Nielsen (Denmark) Rasmus Nørby	7–6^{(9–7)}, 6–4
Win	7–5	Jul 2005	Tarzana, United States	Challenger	Hard	(United States) Alex Bogomolov Jr.	(Australia) Nathan Healey (Australia) Robert Smeets	6–7^{(3–7)}, 7–6^{(9–7)}, 6–3
Loss	7–6	Aug 2005	Binghamton, United States	Challenger	Hard	(United States) Alex Bogomolov Jr.	(United States) Tripp Phillips (United States) Huntley Montgomery	3–6, 2–6
Win	8–6	May 2006	USA F10, Orange Park	Futures	Clay	(United States) Robert Yim	(Slovakia) Matej Bocko (Australia) Daniel Wendler	6–4, 6–2
Win	9–6	Mar 2008	Canada F2, Montreal	Futures	Hard	(United States) Rylan Rizza	(Canada) Milan Pokrajac (Canada) Milos Raonic	7–6^{(7–5)}, 7–6^{(7–4)}
Loss	9–7	Mar 2008	Canada F3, Sherbrooke	Futures	Hard	(United States) Rylan Rizza	(Canada) Daniel Chu (Canada) Adil Shamasdin	6–7^{(2–7)}, 6–3, [7–10]
Loss	9–8	Apr 2008	USA F7, Mobile	Futures	Hard	(United States) Rylan Rizza	(Switzerland) Alexander Sadecky (South Africa) Izak van der Merwe	7–6^{(7–5)}, 4–6, [7–10]
Win	10–8	Jun 2008	Carson, United States	Challenger	Hard	(Australia) Carsten Ball	(United States) Ryler Deheart (New Zealand) Daniel King-Turner	6–4, 6–2
Win	11–8	Aug 2008	Binghamton, United States	Challenger	Hard	(Australia) Carsten Ball	(United States) Brian Battistone (United States) Dann Battistone	6–3, 6–4
Win	12–8	Nov 2008	Nashville, United States	Challenger	Hard	(Australia) Carsten Ball	(India) Harsh Mankad (India) Ashutosh Singh	6–4, 7–5
Win	13–8	Mar 2009	Wolfsburg, Germany	Challenger	Carpet	(United Kingdom) Ken Skupski	(Ukraine) Sergey Bubka (Russia) Alexander Kudryavtsev	6–3, 6–4
Win	14–8	Mar 2009	Jersey, United Kingdom	Challenger	Hard	(United States) Eric Butorac	(United Kingdom) Ken Skupski (United Kingdom) Colin Fleming	6–4, 6–3
Win	15–8	Apr 2009	Monxa, Italy	Challenger	Clay	(United Kingdom) James Auckland	(Czech Republic) Dušan Karol (Czech Republic) Jaroslav Pospíšil	7–5, 6–7^{(6–8)}, [10–4]
Win	16–8	May 2009	Savannah, United States	Challenger	Clay	(Australia) Carsten Ball	(India) Harsh Mankad (United States) Kaes Van't Hof	7–6^{(7–4)}, 6–4
Loss	16–9	May 2009	Carson, United States	Challenger	Hard	(Australia) Carsten Ball	(India) Harsh Mankad (Denmark) Frederik Nielsen	4–6, 4–6
Win	17–9	Jun 2009	Yuba City, United States	Challenger	Hard	(Australia) Carsten Ball	(Australia) Nathan Healey (Australia) Adam Feeney	6–3, 6–4
Win	18–9	Jul 2009	Winnetka, United States	Challenger	Hard	(Australia) Carsten Ball	(United States) Brett Joelson (United States) Ryan Sweeting	6–1, 6–2
Win	19–9	Aug 2009	Cordenons, Italy	Challenger	Clay	(United States) James Cerretani	(Australia) Peter Luczak (Italy) Alessandro Motti	4–6, 6–3, [11–9]
Win	20–9	Oct 2009	Quito, Ecuador	Challenger	Clay	(Mexico) Santiago González	(Colombia) Michael Quintero Aguilar (Spain) Fernando Vicente	1–6, 6–3, [10–3]
Loss	20–10	Oct 2009	Sacramento, United States	Challenger	Hard	(Mexico) Santiago González	(United States) Lester Cook (United States) David Martin	6–4, 3–6, [5–10]
Win	21–10	Jun 2010	Rome, Italy	Challenger	Clay	(Mexico) Santiago González	(Australia) Sadik Kadir (India) Purav Raja	6–2, 6–4
Loss	21–11	Jun 2010	Lugano, Switzerland	Challenger	Clay	(Mexico) Santiago González	(Portugal) Fred Gil (Belgium) Christophe Rochus	5–7, 6–7^{(3–7)}
Win	22–11	Oct 2010	Tiburon, United States	Challenger	Hard	(United States) Robert Kendrick	(Canada) Pierre-Ludovic Duclos (United States) Ryler Deheart	6–1, 6–4
Win	23–11	Oct 2010	Calabasas, United States	Challenger	Hard	(United States) Ryan Harrison	(South Africa) Rik de Voest (United States) Bobby Reynolds	6–3, 6–3
Win	24–11	Jan 2011	Honolulu, United States	Challenger	Hard	(United States) Ryan Harrison	(United States) Robert Kendrick (United States) Alex Kuznetsov	walkover
Win	25–11	Apr 2011	Napoli, Italy	Challenger	Clay	(Germany) Simon Stadler	(United States) Travis Parrott (Sweden) Andreas Siljeström	6–4, 6–4
Loss	25–12	May 2011	Rome, Italy	Challenger	Clay	(Mexico) Santiago González	(Colombia) Juan Sebastián Cabal (Colombia) Robert Farah	6–2, 3–6, [9–11]
Win	26–12	Sep 2011	İzmir, Turkey	Challenger	Hard	(Germany) Simon Stadler	(Italy) Flavio Cipolla (Italy) Thomas Fabbiano	6–0, 6–2
Win	27–12	Jan 2012	Honolulu, United States	Challenger	Hard	(Bosnia and Herzegovina) Amer Delić	(United States) Nicholas Monroe (United States) Jack Sock	6–4, 7–6^{(7–3)}
