= Carson Challenger =

Tennis tournament in Carson, California, United States

Defunct tennis tournament
- Event name: USTA Player Development Classic; USTA LA Tennis Open
- Location: Carson, United States
- Venue: USTA Training Center - West
- Surface: Hard
- Website: www.usta.com/Carson
ATP Tour
- Category: ATP Challenger Tour
- Draw: 32S / 32Q / 16D
- Prize money: $50,000
WTA Tour
- Category: ITF Women's Circuit
- Draw: 32S / 32Q / 16D
- Prize money: $50,000

The Carson Challenger (also known as the USTA Player Development Classic and the USTA LA Tennis Open) was a tournament for professional female and male tennis players. The event on outdoor hardcourts was classified as a $50,000 ITF Women's Circuit tournament and was held in Carson, California in the United States from 2007 to 2011. In 2014, the tournament was a replacement for the Yakima Regional Hospital Challenger, as their clubhouse was destroyed by a fire earlier in the year. The event was also previously part of the ATP Challenger Tour, from 2005 to 2010, with the exception of 2006.

== Past finals ==
=== Men's singles ===
Year	Champions	Runners-up	Score
2010	(United States) Donald Young	(United States) Robert Kendrick	6–4, 6–4
2009 (2)	(United States) Michael Russell	(United States) Michael Yani	6–1, 6–1
2009 (1)	(United States) Wayne Odesnik	(United States) Scoville Jenkins	6–4, 6–4
2008	(United States) Amer Delic	(United States) Alex Bogomolov	7–6^{(7–5)}, 6–4
2007	(United States) Alex Bogomolov Jr.	(Japan) Kei Nishikori	6–4, 6–3
2006	not held		
2005	(United States) Justin Gimelstob	(United States) Amer Delic	7–6^{(7–5)}, 6–2

=== Women's singles ===
Year	Champions	Runners-up	Score
2014	(United States) Nicole Gibbs	(United States) Melanie Oudin	6–4, 6–4
2013–12	not held		
2011	(Italy) Camila Giorgi	(United States) Alexa Glatch	7–6^{(7–4)}, 6–1
2010	(United States) Coco Vandeweghe	(United States) Kristie Ahn	6–1, 6–3
2009	(Canada) Valérie Tétreault	(United States) Alexandra Stevenson	4–6, 6–2, 6–4
2008	(United States) Mashona Washington	(United States) Alexa Glatch	7–5, 6–4
2007	(United States) Jessica Kirkland	(United States) Lauren Albanese	7–6^{(7–2)}, 6–2

=== Men's doubles ===
Year	Champions	Runners-up	Score
2010	(United States) Brian Battistone (United States) Nicholas Monroe	(Russia) Artem Sitak (Portugal) Leonardo Tavares	5–7, 6–3, [10–4]
2009 (2)	(India) Harsh Mankad (Denmark) Frederik Nielsen	(Australia) Carsten Ball (United States) Travis Rettenmaier	6–4, 6–4
2009 (1)	(United States) Scott Lipsky (United States) David Martin	(United States) Lester Cook (United States) Donald Young	7–6^{(7–3)}, 4–6, 10–6
2008	(Australia) Carsten Ball (United States) Travis Rettenmaier	(United States) Ryler DeHeart (New Zealand) Daniel King-Turner	6–4, 6–2
2007	(United States) Rajeev Ram (United States) Bobby Reynolds	(Dominican Republic) Víctor Estrella (United States) Alberto Francis	7–6^{(10–8)}, 6–2
2006	not held		
2005	(United States) Goran Dragicevic (United States) Jan-Michael Gambill	(United States) Cody Conley (United States) Ryan Newport	6–4, 6–3

=== Women's doubles ===
Year	Champions	Runners-up	Score
2014	(Netherlands) Michaëlla Krajicek (Australia) Olivia Rogowska	(United States) Samantha Crawford (United States) Sachia Vickery	7–6^{(7–4)}, 6–1
2013–12	not held		
2011	(United States) Alexandra Mueller (United States) Asia Muhammad	(United States) Christina Fusano (United States) Yasmin Schnack	6–2, 6–3
2010	(United States) Lindsay Lee-Waters (United States) Megan Moulton-Levy	(United States) Christina Fusano (United States) Courtney Nagle	6–1, 6–2
2009	(United States) Laura Granville (United States) Riza Zalameda	(Australia) Monique Adamczak (Australia) Nicole Kriz	6–3, 6–4
2008	(Indonesia) Romana Tedjakusuma (United States) Story Tweedie-Yates	(United States) Kimberly Couts (Georgia (country)) Anna Tatishvili	7–6^{(12–10)}, 4–6, [10–7]
2007	(South Africa) Kim Grant (India) Sunitha Rao	(United States) Angela Haynes (United States) Lindsay Lee-Waters	6–4, 6–4
