= Robert Kendrick =

American tennis player (born 1979)

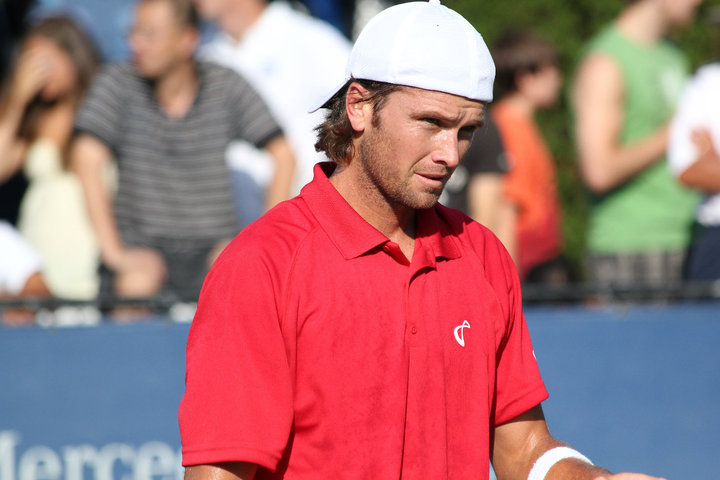
- Country (sports): United States
- Residence: Orlando, Florida, United States
- Born: November 15, 1979 (age 46) Fresno, California, United States
- Height: 6 ft 3 in (1.91 m)
- Turned pro: 2000
- Retired: 2014
- Plays: Right-handed (two-handed backhand)
- Prize money: US$1,363,211

Singles
- Career record: 35–78
- Career titles: 0
- Highest ranking: No. 69 (20 July 2009)

Grand Slam singles results
- Australian Open: 1R (2007, 2008, 2009)
- French Open: 2R (2009)
- Wimbledon: 2R (2006)
- US Open: 2R (2008, 2009)

Doubles
- Career record: 31–42
- Career titles: 1
- Highest ranking: No. 77 (4 February 2008)

Grand Slam doubles results
- Australian Open: 1R (2004, 2007, 2008)
- French Open: 1R (2007, 2009)
- Wimbledon: 2R (2009)
- US Open: QF (2007)

Grand Slam mixed doubles results
- US Open: 2R (2008)
- Last updated on: 1 July 2022.

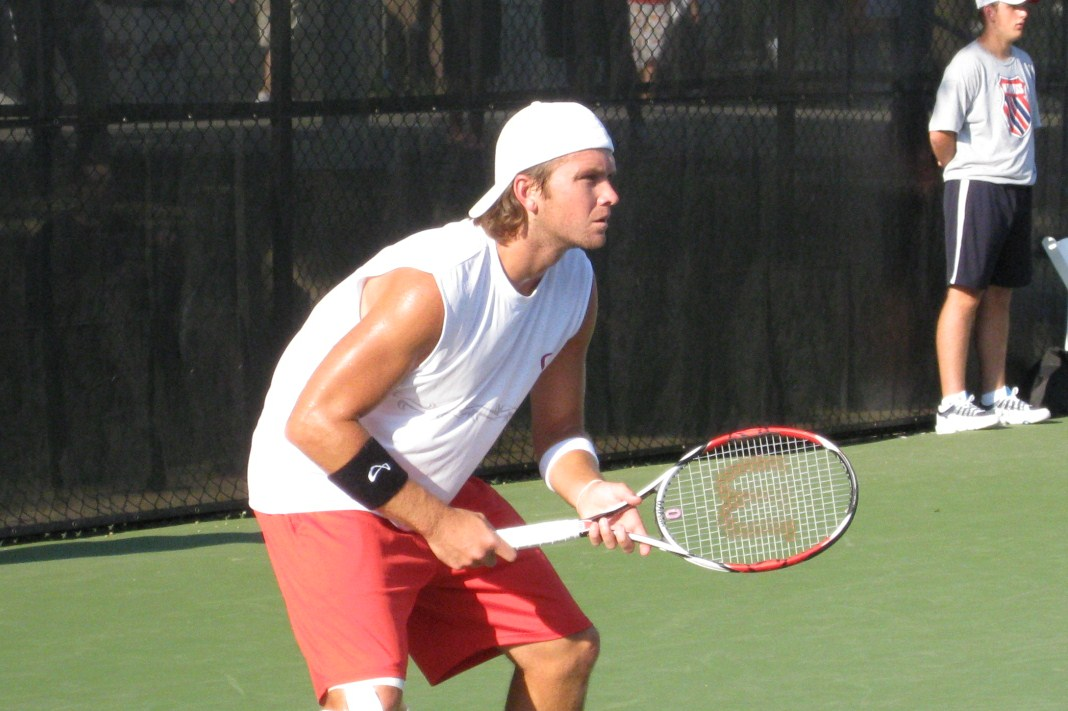

Robert Bradley Kendrick (born November 15, 1979) is an American retired professional tennis player. He turned professional in 2000. His career-high singles ranking is World No. 69, achieved in July 2009.

== Early life ==
Robert Kendrick was born to Tom and Doris Kendrick and began playing tennis at the age of 5. Tom is a real estate appraiser and Doris is a housewife. Kendrick has three older siblings: Kerry, Tommy, and Scott. He graduated from Bullard High School in 1997. In 1996, he led his team to an undefeated section championship.

== College and junior tennis career ==
Kendrick has been called a serve-and-volley player. Kendrick's main strengths are his serve and his forehand.

Throughout high school, he competed in junior tennis and enjoyed some intermittent success. In 1996, he was the runner-up in singles at the 1996 USTA Boys’ 18s National Indoor Championships. Then in 1997, he reached the final in doubles of the Easter Bowl and reached the singles final and took the doubles title at the USTA International Grass Court Championships. In 1998, he attended the University of Washington, earning All-American in singles and doubles as a sophomore, with a record of 31–9 and got as high as no. 3 in the collegiate rankings that year. He then transferred to Pepperdine University for his junior year and again attained All-American with an 18–10 record. He reached the round of 16 at the NCAA Men's Tennis Championship, where he lost to Jeff Morrison. In 2001, he and Michael Russell won the doubles championship at the USTA Futures event in Mobile, Alabama.

== 2006 ==
In 2006, Kendrick entered the top 100 for the first time in his career, ending the year at world no. 87. Consequently, 2006 is generally considered to be Kendrick's breakthrough year to date.

Kendrick got to the second round of the 2006 ATP Delray Beach International Tennis Championships. He defeated Kevin Kim 6–4, 7–5 in the first round, but lost to eighth seed Vincent Spadea 4–6, 1–6, in his second-round match.

Kendrick went into Wimbledon ranked world no. 237. In his first match, he beat Yen-Hsun Lu 7–6, 6–3, 6–0. In the second round, he lost to second seed, Rafael Nadal. The Spaniard had to come back for only the second time in his career from two sets down to beat Kendrick 6–7, 3–6, 7–6, 7–5, 6–4. Kendrick's performance surprised many. Up until the final, Kendrick was the only player in the tournament to take sets from Nadal. The Spaniard lost the final to top-seeded Swiss Roger Federer.

Kendrick played in the Campbell's Hall of Fame Tenis Championships in Newport, Rhode Island. He made it to the quarterfinals, but was beaten by Andy Murray 0–6, 0–6.

He made amends for the defeat by winning the doubles title with his Austrian playing partner Jürgen Melzer. In the final, the duo beat South African Jeff Coetzee and American Justin Gimelstob.

== 2007 ==
In 2007, Kendrick played in all four Grand Slam tournaments. In January at the Australian Open, he drew Rafael Nadal in the first round and lost 6–7, 3–6, 2–6, committing six double faults and having a low percentage of second-serve points won (38%). Kendrick subsequently lost in the first round of several tournaments before reaching the third round at the Sony Ericsson Open in Key Biscayne, Florida, where he was defeated in straight sets by Andy Murray. At the French Open, Kendrick again fell in the first round, losing in four sets to world no. 134 Juan Pablo Brzezicki of Argentina, again thanks to six double faults and a low percentage of second serve points won (this time, 46%).

At the Queen's Club Championships in June, he reached the second round and won a set against Novak Djokovic. At Wimbledon, however, he was not able to reach the second round as he had the previous year, losing a five-setter to Tommy Robredo. He went 1–3 in the US Open Series, before falling to Igor Andreev of Russia in the first round of the US Open itself 6–7, 3–6, 4–6. Again, his second serve was a weakness: he won just 42% of second-serve points and double-faulted five times.

While 2007 was largely a lackluster year for Kendrick on the main ATP circuit, he did win three Challenger events: Dallas, Calabasas, and Knoxville. In Calabasas, Kendrick had to defeat two up-and-coming fellow Americans, John Isner and Donald Young, in the semifinals and finals, respectively.

== 2008 ==
Kendrick kicked off 2008 by playing in the Australian Open, where he lost in the first round to fellow American Amer Delić, then ranked no. 136 4–6, 5–7, 2–6. Although Kendrick won 76% of points where he got his first serve in, he only won 36% of points where he did not. He was broken five times. Later in that year, he joined up with the apparel company Athletic DNA.

== 2009 ==
Kendrick began the year with a loss in the first round of the 2009 Australian Open to Robin Söderling 7–5, 4–6, 4–6, 5–7. He made it to the second round of the Delray Beach International Tennis Championships, before losing to Evgeny Korolev 6–3, 6–6, 5–7, then losing to David Nalbandian in the second round of the BNP Paribas Open 4–6, 4–6. He beat Söderling in the second round of the Sony Ericsson Open, then lost in the third round to Jo-Wilfried Tsonga 5–7, 4–6.

Kendrick did not make it out of the first rounds of the U.S. Men's Clay Court Championships or the Estoril Open. At the 2009 French Open, he beat Daniel Brands 6–7, 7–5, 7–6, 4–6, 6–3, to advance to the second round for the first time in his career, where he lost 5–7, 0–6, 1–6, to Gilles Simon, who had also defeated him at the Estoril Open.

In the first round at Wimbledon, he was beaten by Andy Murray 5–7, 7–6, 3–6, 4–6.

== 2011 ==
During the 2011 French Open, Kendrick tested positive for the drug methylhexanamine, which has been banned in sport since 2010. According to Kendrick, he unwittingly ingested the drug when taking a pill to combat jet lag.

The ITF ruled in July 2011 that he would be banned from the sport for 12 months, effective from May 22, 2011. The ITF also ruled that Kendrick's first-round finish at the 2011 French Open be disqualified, and his ranking points and prize money be taken away.

Kendrick received vocal public support from a number of prominent players, including James Blake, John Isner, and Andy Murray. In interviews, Blake and Isner specifically contrasted his case with that of Wayne Odesnik, who had just returned to active play after his own suspension for possession of human growth hormone.

Kendrick's ban was subsequently decreased to 8 months by the Court of Arbitration for Sport.

== ATP career finals ==
=== Doubles: 2 (1 title, 1 runner-up) ===
Legend Grand Slam Tournaments (0–0) ATP World Tour Finals (0–0) ATP Masters 1000 Series (0–0) ATP 500 Series (0–0) ATP 250 Series (1–1)	Finals by surface Hard (0–1) Clay (0–0) Grass (1–0) Carpet (0–0)	Finals by setting Outdoors (1–0) Indoors (0–1)

Result	W–L	Date	Tournament	Tier	Surface	Partner	Opponents	Score
Loss	0–1	Feb 2003	San Jose, United States	International Series	Hard	(United States) Paul Goldstein	(South Korea) Lee Hyung-Taik (Belarus) Vladimir Voltchkov	5–7, 6–4, 3–6
Win	1–1	Jul 2003	Newport, United States	International Series	Grass	(Austria) Jürgen Melzer	(South Africa) Jeff Coetzee (United States) Justin Gimelstob	7–6^{(7–3)}, 6–0

== ATP Challenger and ITF Futures finals ==
=== Singles: 26 (12–14) ===
Legend ATP Challenger (10–12) ITF Futures (2–2)	Finals by surface Hard (11–12) Clay (1–2) Grass (0–0) Carpet (0–0)

Result	W–L	Date	Tournament	Tier	Surface	Opponent	Score
Loss	0–1	Jul 2000	USA F17, Chico	Futures	Hard	(United States) Zack Fleishman	6–4, 5–7, 4–6
Loss	0–2	Apr 2001	USA F9, Stone Mountain	Futures	Hard	(Russia) Andrei Cherkasov	1–6, 1–6
Win	1–2	Apr 2001	USA F10, Elkin	Futures	Hard	(United States) Jack Brasington	2–6, 6–4, 6–3
Win	2–2	Jun 2002	USA F13, Fresno	Futures	Hard	(United States) Zack Fleishman	3–6, 6–3, 6–4
Win	3–2	Sep 2002	Tulsa, United States	Challenger	Hard	(Brazil) Daniel Melo	6–3, 6–3
Loss	3–3	Nov 2003	Austin, United States	Challenger	Hard	(United States) Paul Goldstein	3–6, 3–6
Win	4–3	Oct 2004	Austin, United States	Challenger	Hard	(South Africa) Wesley Whitehouse	7–5, 6–7^{(2–7)}, 6–2
Loss	4–4	Oct 2004	Burbank, United States	Challenger	Hard	(United States) Kevin Kim	5–7, 6–1, 3–6
Loss	4–5	Feb 2006	Dallas, United States	Challenger	Hard	(United States) Kevin Kim	6–1, 4–6, 1–6
Win	5–5	May 2006	Forest Hills, United States	Challenger	Clay	(United States) Cecil Mamiit	6–2, 6–2
Win	6–5	Nov 2006	Puebla, Mexico	Challenger	Hard	(Argentina) Leonardo Mayer	7–5, 6–4
Win	7–5	Feb 2007	Dallas, United States	Challenger	Hard	(Germany) Benedikt Dorsch	6–3, 6–4
Loss	7–6	May 2007	Naples, United States	Challenger	Clay	(United States) Bobby Reynolds	6–7^{(5–7)}, 4–6
Win	8–6	Oct 2007	Calabasas, United States	Challenger	Hard	(United States) Donald Young	3–6, 7–6^{(7–4)}, 6–4
Win	9–6	Nov 2007	Knoxville, United States	Challenger	Hard	(United States) Kevin Kim	3–6, 6–2, 6–4
Loss	9–7	Apr 2008	Tallahassee, United States	Challenger	Hard	(United States) Bobby Reynolds	7–5, 4–6, 3–6
Loss	9–8	May 2008	Bradenton, United States	Challenger	Clay	(United States) Jesse Levine	3–6, 7–5, 6–7^{(3–7)}
Loss	9–9	Jul 2008	Lexington, United States	Challenger	Hard	(India) Somdev Devvarman	3–6, 3–6
Loss	9–10	Oct 2008	Sacramento, United States	Challenger	Hard	(United States) Donald Young	4–6, 1–6
Win	10–10	Nov 2008	Louisville, United States	Challenger	Hard	(United States) Donald Young	6–1, 6–1
Win	11–10	Nov 2008	Nashville, United States	Challenger	Hard	(India) Somdev Devvarman	6–3, 7–5
Loss	11–11	May 2010	Carson, United States	Challenger	Hard	(United States) Donald Young	4–6, 4–6
Loss	11–12	Aug 2010	Binghamton, United States	Challenger	Hard	(Japan) Kei Nishikori	3–6, 6–7^{(4–7)}
Loss	11–13	Oct 2010	Sacramento, United States	Challenger	Hard	(Australia) John Millman	3–6, 2–6
Win	12–13	Nov 2010	Charlottesville, United States	Challenger	Hard	(United States) Michael Shabaz	6–2, 6–3
Loss	12–14	Nov 2010	Knoxville, United States	Challenger	Hard	(Japan) Kei Nishikori	1–6, 4–6

=== Doubles: 30 (12–18) ===
Legend ATP Challenger (9–15) ITF Futures (3–3)	Finals by surface Hard (11–16) Clay (1–2) Grass (0–0) Carpet (0–0)

Result	W–L	Date	Tournament	Tier	Surface	Partner	Opponents	Score
Win	1–0	Dec 1999	USA F22, Phoenix	Futures	Hard	(United States) Diego Ayala	(Israel) Oren Motevassel (Germany) Alexander Waske	6–1, 6–3
Win	2–0	Jun 2000	USA F16, Redding	Futures	Hard	(United States) Zack Fleishman	(United States) Trace Fielding (Mexico) David Roditi	7–6^{(9–7)}, 6–1
Loss	2–1	Jul 2000	USA F17, Chico	Futures	Clay	(United States) Zack Fleishman	(United States) Michael Joyce (Australia) Luke Smith	6–7^{(3–7)}, 7–6^{(7–3)}, 1–6
Loss	2–2	Aug 2000	USA F22, Godfrey	Futures	Hard	(United States) Jason Cook	(United States) Jeff Laski (United States) Gavin Sontag	2–4, 4–5^{(4–7)}, 4–2, 2–4
Win	3–2	Apr 2001	USA F7, Mobile	Futures	Hard	(United States) Michael Russell	(South Africa) Vaughan Snyman (Israel) Nir Welgreen	6–1, 6–4
Loss	3–3	Apr 2001	USA F9, Stone Mountain	Futures	Hard	(United States) Brandon Hawk	(United States) Gavin Sontag (Canada) Jerry Turek	6–1, 4–6, 3–6
Loss	3–4	Jun 2001	Tallahassee, United States	Challenger	Hard	(United States) Brandon Hawk	(Australia) Matthew Breen (Australia) Lee Pearson	4–6, 2–6
Loss	3–5	Jul 2001	Granby, Canada	Challenger	Hard	(United States) Brandon Hawk	(Canada) Bobby Kokavec (United States) Jeff Morrison	4–6, 4–6
Win	4–5	Jul 2001	Aptos, United States	Challenger	Hard	(United States) Brandon Hawk	(United States) Kelly Gullett (United States) Gavin Sontag	7–5, 7–5
Win	5–5	Oct 2001	Kerrville, United States	Challenger	Hard	(United States) Brandon Hawk	(United States) Mardy Fish (United States) Jeff Morrison	6–3, 6–7^{(7–9)}, 6–3
Loss	5–6	Aug 2002	Binghamton, United States	Challenger	Hard	(Israel) Amir Hadad	(United States) Paul Goldstein (United States) Scott Humphries	6–4, 6–7^{(1–7)}, 5–7
Win	6–6	Oct 2002	San Antonio, United States	Challenger	Hard	(United States) Diego Ayala	(United States) Hugo Armando (Socialist Federal Republic of Yugoslavia) Dušan Vemić	6–2, 6–4
Loss	6–7	Nov 2002	Puebla, Mexico	Challenger	Hard	(United States) Diego Ayala	(Mexico) Miguel Gallardo Valles (Mexico) Alejandro Hernández	1–6, 7–5, 6–7^{(3–7)}
Win	7–7	Jan 2003	Waikoloa, United States	Challenger	Hard	(United States) Diego Ayala	(United States) Levar Harper-Griffith (United States) Alex Kim	4–6, 7–6^{(7–2)}, 6–2
Win	8–7	Apr 2003	Paget, Bermuda	Challenger	Clay	(The Bahamas) Mark Merklein	(Australia) Ashley Fisher (Australia) Andrew Kratzmann	6–3, 3–1 ret.
Loss	8–8	May 2003	Birmingham, United States	Challenger	Clay	(United States) Paul Goldstein	(Brazil) Josh Goffi (United States) Travis Parrott	4–6, 6–2, 2–6
Loss	8–9	Oct 2003	Tiburon, United States	Challenger	Hard	(United States) Diego Ayala	(United States) Brandon Coupe (United States) Justin Gimelstob	6–0, 3–6, 6–7^{(3–7)}
Loss	8–10	Oct 2003	Torrance, United States	Challenger	Hard	(United States) Diego Ayala	(Paraguay) Ramón Delgado (Brazil) André Sá	3–6, 4–6
Loss	8–11	Oct 2004	Austin, United States	Challenger	Hard	(United States) Brian Vahaly	(Brazil) André Sá (Brazil) Bruno Soares	3–6, 1–6
Loss	8–12	Oct 2004	Tiburon, United States	Challenger	Hard	(United States) Brandon Coupe	(Brazil) André Sá (Brazil) Bruno Soares	2–6, 3–6
Loss	8–13	Jun 2006	Busan, South Korea	Challenger	Hard	(United States) Cecil Mamiit	(United States) Scott Lipsky (United States) Todd Widom	3–6, 7–6^{(7–2)}, [7–10]
Win	9–13	Oct 2006	Calabasas, United States	Challenger	Hard	(Philippines) Cecil Mamiit	(Israel) Harel Levy (United States) Sam Warburg	5–7, 6–4, [10–5]
Loss	9–14	Nov 2006	Louisville, United States	Challenger	Hard	(United States) Amer Delić	(Netherlands) Robin Haase (Netherlands) Igor Sijsling	walkover
Win	10–14	Oct 2007	Sacramento, United States	Challenger	Hard	(United States) Brian Wilson	(United States) John Paul Fruttero (United States) Sam Warburg	7–5, 7–6^{(10–8)}
Loss	10–15	Oct 2007	Calabasas, United States	Challenger	Hard	(Philippines) Cecil Mamiit	(United States) John Isner (United States) Brian Wilson	6–7^{(10–12)}, 6–4, [8–10]
Loss	10–16	Apr 2008	Tallahassee, United States	Challenger	Hard	(United States) Ryan Sweeting	(United States) Rajeev Ram (United States) Bobby Reynolds	walkover
Loss	10–17	Apr 2010	Tallahassee, United States	Challenger	Hard	(United States) Bobby Reynolds	(Australia) Stephen Huss (Australia) Joseph Sirianni	2–6, 4–6
Win	11–17	Oct 2010	Tiburon, United States	Challenger	Hard	(United States) Travis Rettenmaier	(United States) Ryler DeHeart (Canada) Pierre-Ludovic Duclos	6–1, 6–4
Win	12–17	Nov 2010	Charlottesville, United States	Challenger	Hard	(United States) Donald Young	(United States) Ryler DeHeart (Canada) Pierre-Ludovic Duclos	7–6^{(7–5)}, 7–6^{(7–3)}
Loss	12–18	Jan 2011	Honolulu, United States	Challenger	Hard	(United States) Alex Kuznetsov	(United States) Travis Rettenmaier (United States) Ryan Harrison	walkover

== Performance timelines ==
Key
W	F	SF	QF	#R	RR	Q#	P#	DNQ	A	Z#	PO	G	S	B	NMS	NTI	P	NH

(W) winner; (F) finalist; (SF) semifinalist; (QF) quarterfinalist; (#R) rounds 4, 3, 2, 1; (RR) round-robin stage; (Q#) qualification round; (P#) preliminary round; (DNQ) did not qualify; (A) absent; (Z#) Davis/Fed Cup Zonal Group (with number indication) or (PO) play-off; (G) gold, (S) silver or (B) bronze Olympic/Paralympic medal; (NMS) not a Masters tournament; (NTI) not a Tier I tournament; (P) postponed; (NH) not held; (SR) strike rate (events won / competed); (W–L) win–loss record.

=== Singles ===
Tournament	2001	2002	2003	2004	2005	2006	2007	2008	2009	2010	2011	2012	2013	2014	SR	W–L	Win%
Grand Slam tournaments
Australian Open	A	Q3	Q2	A	A	A	1R	1R	1R	Q2	A	A	A	A	0 / 3	0–3	0%
French Open	A	Q1	A	Q3	Q1	A	1R	A	2R	A	1R	A	A	A	0 / 3	1–3	25%
Wimbledon	Q1	Q2	1R	Q2	Q1	2R	1R	Q3	1R	1R	A	A	A	A	0 / 5	1–5	17%
US Open	Q1	Q3	1R	Q1	A	1R	1R	2R	2R	1R	A	A	A	A	0 / 6	2–6	25%
Win–loss	0–0	0–0	0–2	0–0	0–0	1–2	0–4	1–2	2–4	0–2	0–1	0–0	0–0	0–0	0 / 17	4–17	19%
ATP Tour Masters 1000
Indian Wells	A	A	A	Q2	Q1	A	1R	Q2	2R	Q1	Q1	A	A	Q1	0 / 2	1–2	33%
Miami	A	A	Q2	Q2	A	A	3R	Q1	3R	Q1	1R	A	A	A	0 / 3	3–3	50%
Canada	A	A	A	A	A	1R	A	A	A	A	A	A	A	A	0 / 1	0–1	0%
Cincinnati	A	A	1R	A	A	A	Q1	A	Q2	A	A	A	A	A	0 / 1	0–1	0%
Paris	A	A	A	A	A	A	A	A	Q2	A	A	A	A	A	0 / 0	0–0	–
Win–loss	0–0	0–0	0–1	0–0	0–0	0–1	1–2	0–0	3–2	0–0	0–1	0–0	0–0	0–0	0 / 7	4–7	36%

=== Doubles ===
Tournament	2001	2002	2003	2004	2005	2006	2007	2008	2009	2010	SR	W–L	Win%
Grand Slam tournaments
Australian Open	A	A	A	1R	A	A	1R	1R	A	A	0 / 3	0–3	0%
French Open	A	A	A	A	A	A	1R	A	1R	A	0 / 2	0–2	0%
Wimbledon	A	1R	1R	A	A	A	A	Q2	2R	A	0 / 3	1–3	25%
US Open	1R	A	A	A	A	1R	QF	1R	3R	2R	0 / 6	6–6	50%
Win–loss	0–1	0–1	0–1	0–1	0–0	0–1	3–3	0–2	3–3	1–1	0 / 14	7–14	33%
