= Todd Widom =

American tennis player

- Country (sports): United States
- Born: 24 April 1983 (age 43) Coral Springs, Florida, U.S.
- Plays: Right-handed
- College: University of Miami
- Prize money: $239,052

Singles
- Career record: 5–5 (at ATP Tour level, Grand Slam level, and in Davis Cup)
- Career titles: 0
- Highest ranking: No. 200 (7 August 2006)

Grand Slam singles results
- Australian Open: Q3 (2006)
- French Open: Q1 (2009)
- Wimbledon: Q1 (2006, 2008, 2009)
- US Open: Q2 (2006, 2008)

Doubles
- Career record: 2–2 (at ATP Tour level, Grand Slam level, and in Davis Cup)
- Career titles: 0
- Highest ranking: No. 162 (4 May 2009)
- Last updated on: 8 June 2021.

Todd Widom (born April 24, 1983, in Coral Springs, Florida) is a retired American professional tennis player.

== Biography ==
Widom grew up in Coral Springs, Florida. He is the son of Eloise Widom and has one brother, Gary. He is married to Beth Eisenberg also of Coral Springs. He coaches professional, college, and junior tennis players at his academy called TW Tennis, located in Coral Springs. He is an avid sports fan and in his spare time enjoys golf and fishing.

== Career ==
Widom attended and played at the University of Miami from 2001 to 2003. During this time, he was recognized as "Most Outstanding Player" at the Big East tournament and was named to the USA Tennis Collegiate Team.

In doubles, he and the American Scott Lipsky won an ATP Challenger tournament in Busan, Korea, in May 2006. Widom reached a career high singles ranking of 200 in July 2006 and a doubles ranking of 162 in April 2009.

Within the span of three years, Widom was diagnoses with eye cancer, two knee injuries, and elbow inflammation in his elbow, but recovered and continues to play and travel across the world regularly.

Playing mainly challenger tournaments, Widom achieved his career breakthrough when he won three matches in 2009 to qualify for the SAP Open in San Jose, and went on to beat 44th ranked Robby Ginepri, former 21st ranked Taylor Dent, and lost in three sets to the 21st ranked Radek Štěpánek. The following month, Widom went back to California and qualified for the ATP Masters 1000 at Indian Wells. He started by beating Iván Navarro in straight sets and eventually lost to 12th ranked David Ferrer.

This turn of events prompted ESPN to report that "a red-headed, blue-eyed journeyman from Coral Springs, Florida, made the largest leap of any player on the ultimate tennis ladder. After a series of outrageous misfortunes, Todd Widom did something extraordinary: He reached the quarterfinals of the SAP Open in San Jose."

== ATP Challenger and ITF Futures finals ==
=== Singles: 8 (3–5) ===
Legend ATP Challenger (0–2) ITF Futures (3–3)	Finals by surface Hard (3–5) Clay (0–0) Grass (0–0) Carpet (0–0)

Result	W–L	Date	Tournament	Tier	Surface	Opponent	Score
Win	1–0	Jul 2003	USA F21, Joplin	Futures	Hard	(Australia) Jay Gooding	6–4, 7–6^{(7–4)}
Win	2–0	Nov 2003	USA F31, Honolulu	Futures	Hard	(Algeria) Lamine Ouahab	3–6, 6–3, 6–4
Loss	2–1	Nov 2003	USA F32, Waikoloa	Futures	Hard	(Netherlands) Paul Logtens	7–6^{(7–2)}, 3–6, 4–6
Loss	2–2	Jan 2004	USA F1, Tampa	Futures	Hard	(United States) Brian Baker	3–6, 4–6
Loss	2–3	Jul 2004	Canada F5, Ontario	Futures	Hard	(Japan) Takahiro Terachi	4–6, 6–2, 4–6
Win	3–3	Apr 2005	USA F8, Mobile	Futures	Hard	(United States) Wayne Odesnik	4–6, 6–4, 6–2
Loss	3–4	Dec 2005	Orlando, United States	Challenger	Hard	(United States) Michael Russell	4–6, 2–6
Loss	3–5	Nov 2007	Caloundra, Australia	Challenger	Hard	(Australia) Joseph Sirianni	6–7^{(2–7)}, 6–7^{(5–7)}

=== Doubles: 12 (3–9) ===
Legend ATP Challenger (3–4) ITF Futures (0–5)	Finals by surface Hard (3–6) Clay (0–3) Grass (0–0) Carpet (0–0)

Result	W–L	Date	Tournament	Tier	Surface	Partner	Opponents	Score
Loss	0–1	Jul 2003	USA F19, Peoria	Futures	Clay	(United States) Scott Lipsky	(Brazil) Eduardo Bohrer (Brazil) Márcio Carlsson	6–7^{(5–7)}, 6–7^{(5–7)}
Loss	0–2	Nov 2003	USA F31, Honolulu	Futures	Hard	(United States) Scott Lipsky	(United States) Trace Fielding (United States) Keith From	5–7, 7–6^{(9–7)}, 1–6
Loss	0–3	Nov 2003	USA F32, Waikoloa	Futures	Hard	(United States) Scott Lipsky	(United States) Trace Fielding (United States) Keith From	walkover
Loss	0–4	Jul 2004	Canada F5, Ontario	Futures	Hard	(United States) David Martin	(Canada) Matt Klinger (Australia) Daniel Wendler	walkover
Loss	0–5	Oct 2004	USA F29, Arlington	Futures	Hard	(United States) Scott Lipsky	(Chinese Taipei) Ti Chen (Japan) Go Soeda	5–7, 2–6
Win	1–5	Jan 2006	Nouméa, New Caledonia	Challenger	Hard	(United States) Alex Bogomolov Jr.	(Germany) Lars Burgsmüller (Germany) Denis Gremelmayr	3–6, 6–2, [10–6]
Win	2–5	Jul 2006	Busan, South Korea	Challenger	Hard	(United States) Scott Lipsky	(United States) Cecil Mamiit (United States) Robert Kendrick	6–3, 6–7^{(2–7)}, [10–7]
Loss	2–6	Jul 2006	Aptos, United States	Challenger	Hard	(United States) Rajeev Ram	(India) Prakash Amritraj (India) Rohan Bopanna	6–3, 2–6, [6–10]
Loss	2–7	May 2008	Tunica Resorts, United States	Challenger	Clay	(United States) Ryler Deheart	(Serbia) Vladimir Obradović (South Africa) Izak van der Merwe	6–7^{(5–7)}, 4–6
Loss	2–8	May 2008	Bradenton, United States	Challenger	Clay	(United States) Ryler Deheart	(Australia) Carsten Ball (United States) Lester Cook	6–4, 3–6, [6–10]
Win	3–8	Jul 2008	Winnetka, United States	Challenger	Hard	(United States) Michael Yani	(Chinese Taipei) Ti Chen (New Zealand) José Statham	6–2, 6–2
Loss	3–9	Jul 2008	Aptos, United States	Challenger	Hard	(United States) Michael Yani	(Israel) Noam Okun (Israel) Amir Weintraub	2–6, 1–6

== Performance timelines ==
Key
W	F	SF	QF	#R	RR	Q#	DNQ	A	NH

(W) winner; (F) finalist; (SF) semifinalist; (QF) quarterfinalist; (#R) rounds 4, 3, 2, 1; (RR) round-robin stage; (Q#) qualification round; (DNQ) did not qualify; (A) absent; (NH) not held; (SR) strike rate (events won / competed); (W–L) win–loss record.

=== Singles ===
Tournament]	2003	2004	2005	2006	2007	2008	2009	2010	SR	W–L	Win %
Grand Slam tournaments
Australian Open	A	A	A	Q3	A	A	A	Q1	0 / 0	0–0	–
French Open	A	A	A	A	A	A	Q1	A	0 / 0	0–0	–
Wimbledon	A	A	A	Q1	A	Q1	Q1	A	0 / 0	0–0	–
US Open	Q1	Q1	A	Q2	A	Q2	Q1	A	0 / 0	0–0	–
Win–loss	0–0	0–0	0–0	0–0	0–0	0–0	0–0	0–0	0 / 0	0–0	–
ATP Tour Masters 1000
Indian Wells Masters	A	A	A	Q1	A	A	2R	A	0 / 1	1–1	50%
Cincinnati Masters	A	A	A	A	A	Q2	A	A	0 / 0	0–0	–
Win–loss	0–0	0–0	0–0	0–0	0–0	0–0	1–1	0–0	0 / 1	1–1	50%
