= Donald Young (tennis) =

American tennis player (born 1989)

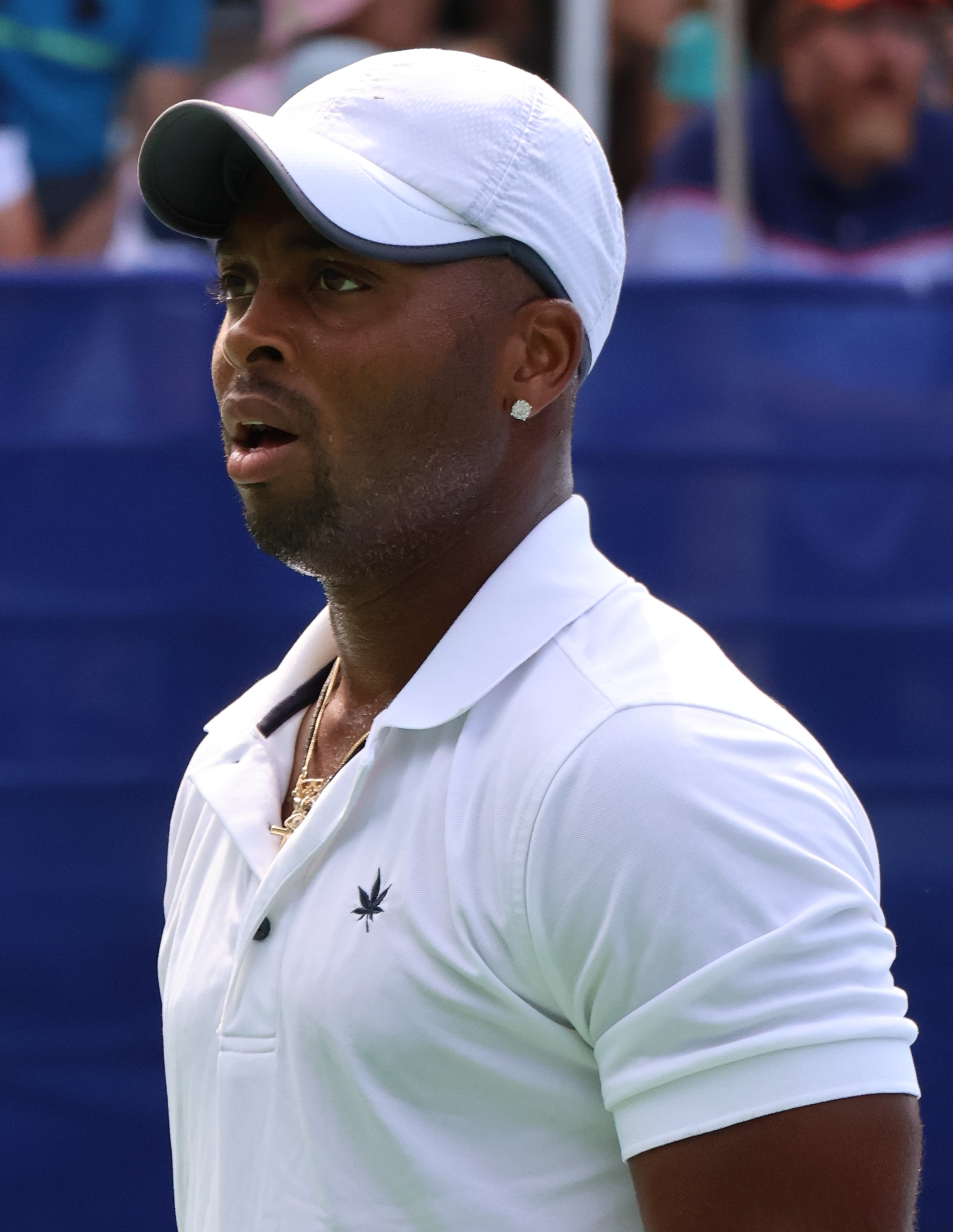
- Young in 2023
- Full name: Donald Oliver Young Jr.
- Country (sports): United States
- Residence: Atlanta, Georgia, US
- Born: July 23, 1989 (age 37) Chicago, Illinois, US
- Height: 6 ft 0 in (1.83 m)
- Turned pro: 2004
- Retired: 2024
- Plays: Left-handed (two-handed backhand)
- Prize money: $4,694,661

Singles
- Career record: 124–190
- Career titles: 0
- Highest ranking: No. 38 (February 27, 2012)

Grand Slam singles results
- Australian Open: 3R (2014)
- French Open: 3R (2014)
- Wimbledon: 2R (2016, 2017)
- US Open: 4R (2011, 2015)

Other tournaments
- Olympic Games: 1R (2012)

Doubles
- Career record: 45–76
- Career titles: 0
- Highest ranking: No. 43 (August 14, 2017)

Grand Slam doubles results
- Australian Open: 3R (2017)
- French Open: F (2017)
- Wimbledon: 2R (2014)
- US Open: 3R (2015)

Grand Slam mixed doubles results
- US Open: F (2024)
- Last updated on: 5 September 2024.

Donald Oliver Young Jr. (born July 23, 1989) is an American professional pickleball player with the American PPA Tour and Major League Pickleball, and also a former professional tennis player. Young had a tennis career-high ATP singles ranking of No. 38, achieved on 27 February 2012, and doubles ranking of world No. 43, achieved on 14 August 2017. As a junior he was ranked No. 1 in the world in 2005. His best singles performance was reaching the fourth round of the 2011 US Open, as well as the 2015 US Open. In doubles, he reached the final of the 2017 French Open, partnering Santiago González. In mixed doubles, he reached the final of the 2024 US Open, partnering Taylor Townsend.

== Early life ==
Young began playing tennis at age three with mother, Illona, and father, Donald sr., who are both tennis teaching professionals.

== Career ==
=== Junior and early career ===
In 2001 he came in second to Jesse Levine in the U.S. Clay Court 14 Nationals in Fort Lauderdale, Florida. He was up 5-0 in the third set of the final. Young had lost the first set, won the second, and was leading 5–0 and serving for the match at 40–15. Levine scored 23 consecutive points to defeat Young 7–5.

In 2003, Young won the Orange Bowl 16-under title (defeating Thron), becoming the first American to win that age division title since Jim Courier in 1986.

He turned professional in 2004; he played ATP Tour, Futures and Challenger events. Due to the slow start, his handlers were often criticized for pushing him too fast during the early stages. In 2004, Young reached the Orange Bowl 18-under final (lost to Neilly). He won the Easter Bowl 14s and 18s titles in 2003 and 2004 and was named as Davis Cup practice partner for the quarterfinal tie against Spain in 2007.

Young was, in 2005, ranked the No. 1 junior player in the world. Young was the youngest male to win a Grand Slam event, winning the Australian Open Junior Championships in 2005. Young also won the US Open Junior Doubles Championship with Alex Clayton.

In 2005, he became the youngest year-end world No. 1 in junior rankings ever at 16 years, 5 months (one month younger than Richard Gasquet in 2002). Young won the Australian Open junior title at age 15 to become youngest-ever and first African-American man to be ranked No. 1 in the world. He was also the first American to win the Australian junior title and finish No. 1 since Andy Roddick in 2000. He advanced to the semifinals at Wimbledon and quarterfinals at the US Open in 2005. In doubles, Young won the junior US Open title (with Clayton) and reached the final at the Australian Open (with Thiemo de Bakker). In 2007, he won the Wimbledon junior title and was the first American to win since Scott Humphries in 1994. As number one, Young won the Kalamazoo U.S. Junior Championships in 2006, after Jesse Levine forfeited in the finals due to food poisoning.

=== 2007: Breaking top 100 ===
In January 2007, he reached the finals of a Futures tournament on the ITF Men's Circuit, as well as winning a Futures title in April. In July 2007, Young won the Junior Wimbledon title, beating top seed Vladimir Ignatik in the final. No American won the championship again until Noah Rubin in 2014. Shortly thereafter, Young won a Challenger tournament, and his ranking rose sharply to No. 221.

His rank rose sharply, from No. 92 to No. 7 on the ITF Junior Circuit (as of July 13, 2007) after he won the Junior Wimbledon Championships. He opted to play only some of the Grand Slam tournaments in 2007 and concentrate on playing professional events. On August 19, 2007, Young won his first ATP Tour level singles match. In the first round of New Haven, he beat fellow American Amer Delic in three sets. In the following round, he lost a tight three-setter to Russian Nikolay Davydenko. Young then received a wildcard into the main US Open draw. On August 27, 2007, Young defeated Australian Chris Guccione in the first round. This was his first career victory in a Grand Slam match. On August 30, Young won his second-round match by default. It was against heavily favored opponent Richard Gasquet, who had fallen ill during the tournament and officially withdrew after morning practice. Young fell in the third round to unseeded Feliciano López in four sets.

Young carried the momentum into the fall, making it to the finals of four Challenger tournaments and posting an overall fall record of 21–7 on the Challenger circuit. This was enough to hoist him into the top 100 on the ATP rankings. He lost in the finals of the JSM Challenger in Champaign, Illinois, at the University of Illinois to Jesse Levine. His talents were recognized by the Association of Tennis Professionals in December 2007, as for Young was one of 11 honored in the 2007 Century Club

=== 2008: Breaking top 75 ===
In the Australian Open, Young lost in the first round to Michael Berrer in four sets. There were much higher hopes for Young as he made it to the quarterfinals of the tennis tournament in Memphis. Young defeated Sam Warburg and Alejandro Falla in the first and second rounds, respectively, before losing in a tough three-set match to Jonas Björkman. At Indian Wells, Young made it to the third round. He defeated Bobby Reynolds in the first round. Then in the second round, he took out 32nd seed, Feliciano López in three sets. He lost to eventual champion Rafael Nadal in the third round. He lost in the first round of the French Open, then lost a close four-set match in the first round at Wimbledon against Jesse Levine. At the Canadian Open, Young won two preliminary matches to qualify for the tournament, before dropping his first-round match to Gilles Simon. At the Countrywide Classic in Los Angeles, he defeated former world No. 2, Tommy Haas (ranked No. 40 at the time). In the first round of the US Open, Young lost to James Blake in a five-set thriller. He came back from down a break to win the fourth set. Although the final set was tied 4–4, with the help of two key calls overturned on challenges in the last two games, Blake won. Young won the Sacramento Challenger tournament on October 13, 2008.

=== 2009 ===
Young lost to Alejandro Falla in qualifying for Wimbledon. Young received a wildcard into 2009 Legg Mason Tennis Classic in Washington, D.C. He played against Lleyton Hewitt who won the match. In the qualifying competition for the 2009 US Open, he won his first match against Marco Crugnola. In the second, he beat Guillermo Olaso, and he won his third-round match against Lukáš Rosol to qualify. In the first round of the main draw, he was beaten by Tommy Robredo. He failed to qualify for the Thailand Open. However, he received a lucky loser spot and had a first-round bye. He lost in the second round to Andreas Beck. Young failed to qualify for the China Open. Young lost to Ilija Bozoljac in the first round of the Tiburon (CA) Challenger on October 12.

Young played Louk Sorensen in the first round of the Calabasas Challenger and won. He then defeated Taylor Dent and won his third-round match against Luka Gregorc. He then defeated Michael Yani and Michael Russell to win the Calabasas Challenger. Young won his first three matches at the Charlottesville (VA) Challenger against Vincent Spadea, Kevin Anderson, and Dominic Inglot. Young lost to Kevin Kim in the semifinals. Young defeated Jesse Levine in the first round of the Knoxville (TN) Challenger and Alex Kuznetsov in the second round. Young lost to Grega Žemlja in the quarterfinals.

Young defeated Jack Sock in the first round of the wildcard draw for the Australian Open. He then lost to Ryan Harrison in the second round.

=== 2010 ===
Young defeated Christophe Rochus in the first round of the 2010 Australian Open and was defeated in the second by Lleyton Hewitt. Young defeated Tim Smyczek in the first round of the Honolulu Challenger. Young then defeated Grigor Dimitrov and Robert Kendrick. He lost to Michael Russell in the semifinals as he retired. Young failed to qualify in Memphis, Delray Beach, Indian Wells, and Miami.

Young received a wildcard into the main draw of the U.S. Clay Championship, but lost to Kevin Anderson in the first round. Young received a wildcard into the Baton Rouge Challenger and defeated Tatsuma Ito in the first round but lost to Go Soeda in the second. Young lost to Carsten Ball in the first round of the Tallahassee Challenger. Young defeated Greg Ouellette in round one of the Savannah Challenger. Young then defeated Ryler DeHeart and Cătălin Gârd, he lost to Ryan Sweeting in the semifinals. Young lost to Joseph Sirianni in the first round of the Sarasota Challenger. He defeated Robert Kendrick in the final of LA Tennis Open to win the Challenger, and Leonardo Tavares in the first round of the Ojai Challenger. Young then defeated Dayne Kelly and Luka Gregorc. He lost to Bobby Reynolds in the semifinals.

Young failed to qualify for Wimbledon. Young defeated Ryan Harrison in the first round of the Winnetka Challenger, and then he defeated Simon Stadler and Lester Cook. Young lost to Tim Smyczek in the semifinals. Young defeated Greg Jones in the first round of the Aptos Challenger. He then defeated Artem Sitak, Ilija Bozoljac, and Somdev Devvarman. Young lost to Marinko Matosevic in the final. In the first round of the Atlanta ATP Tournament, Young defeated Dudi Sela, but then lost to Kevin Anderson. Young failed to qualify for the Legg Mason. He lost to Ernests Gulbis in the first round in Cincinnati. Young defeated Stéphane Robert in the first round in New Haven, before losing to Juan Ignacio Chela in three sets. Young lost to Gilles Simon in the first round of the US Open. Young and partner Robert Kendrick won the doubles championship at the Virginia National Bank Challenger in November.

=== 2011: US Open fourth round, top 40 ===
Young lost to Marin Čilić in the first round of the 2011 Australian Open. At the Indian Wells Masters 1000 event, he defeated his highest-ranked opponent to-date, Andy Murray (No. 4), winning in straight sets. In April, Young won the Tallahassee Tennis Challenger. He advanced to the second round of the 2011 Aegon International and the 2011 Aegon Championships. Young made it to his first ATP semifinal in August at the Washington, D.C. ATP 500 event.

At the 2011 US Open, Young defeated Lukáš Lacko in the first round, and in the second round world No. 14 Stanislas Wawrinka in his first five-set victory, in 4 hours and 21 minutes. He advanced to the third round in a Grand Slam tournament for the first time in his career by defeating Juan Ignacio Chela in straight sets. Young was defeated in the fourth round by Andy Murray in a rain-delayed match.

At the start of October, Young triumphed over world No. 14 Gaël Monfils in a come-from-behind three-setter, before losing to Andy Murray in his first ATP final at the PTT Thailand Open.

He finished the year ranked in the top 40 at No. 39, the highest year-end ranking in his career.

=== 2012: Loss of form, Olympics debut ===
Young went 17 matches without a victory during 2012 before defeating Leonardo Mayer at the 2012 Winston-Salem Open.

He competed in the men's singles at the 2012 Summer Olympics.

At the US Open, he was defeated by top seed Roger Federer in the first round.

=== 2013: Challenger Tour success ===
Young failed to qualify for the 2013 Australian Open and for Wimbledon. He did qualify for the US Open and won his first-round match against Martin Kližan. Young won back-to-back ATP Challenger tournaments at Napa Valley and Sacramento during late September and early October.

=== 2014: Two major third rounds ===
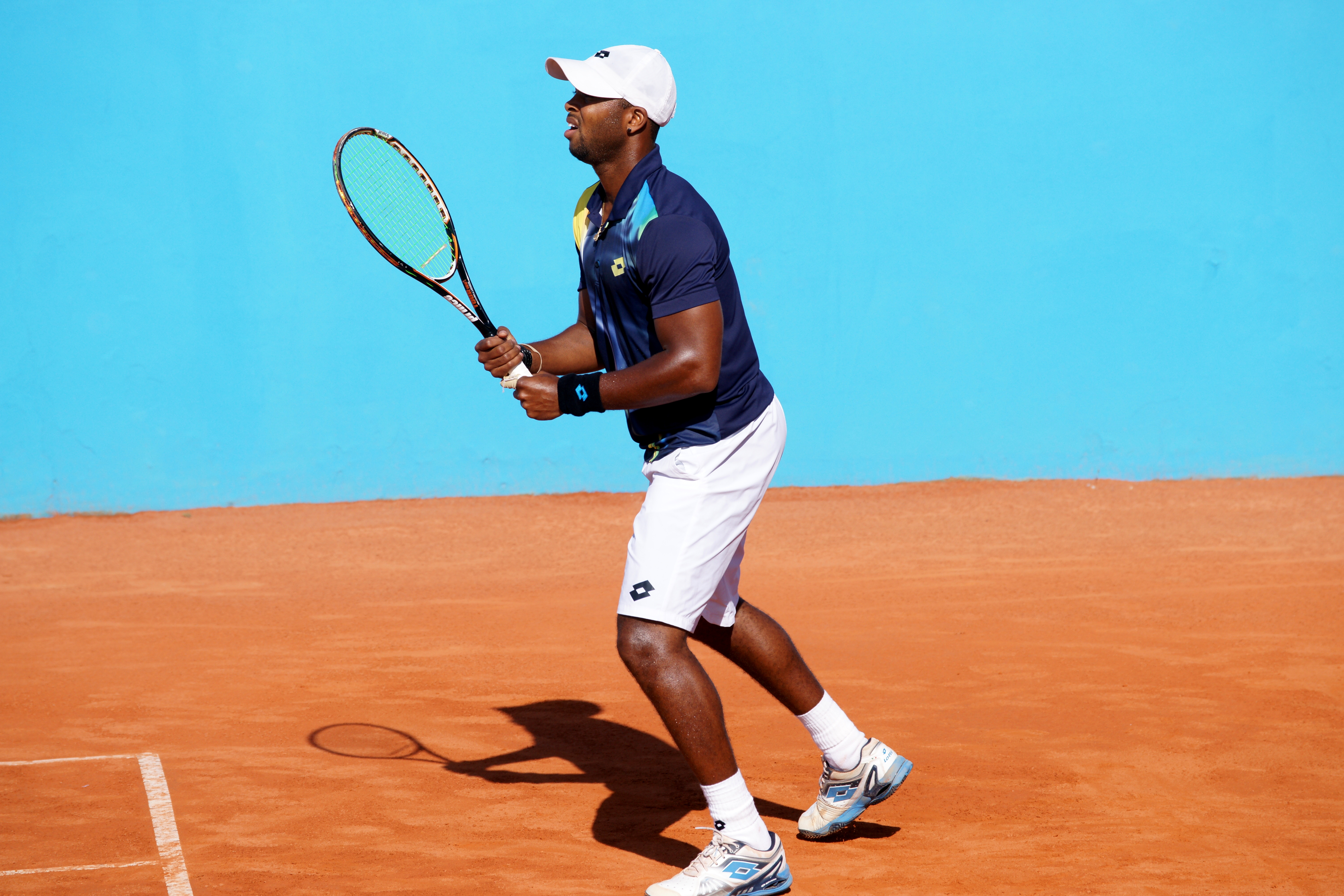
Donald Young at the 2014 Open de Nice Côte d'Azur.

Young received a wildcard into the 2014 Australian Open. He eventually made it to the third round and thus reached a ranking of No. 79 after the tournament.

Young represented the United States in a first round Davis Cup tie against Great Britain. He played one rubber and lost to Andy Murray in straight sets on clay inside Petco Park.

Young made it to the third round of the French Open, eventually losing in five sets to Guillermo García-López. Young made it to the semifinals of the Washington Open losing to the top ranked Canadian Milos Raonic.

=== 2015: US Open fourth round ===
Young reached the final in the Delray Beach Open, his first ATP singles final since 2011, but lost in straight sets to Ivo Karlović. In March, Young played Andy Murray in a Davis Cup tie and lost in four sets, as well as losing to Murray again later in March in Miami.

At the US Open, Young became a darling of the American fans en route to matching his 2011 performance by reaching the round of 16. He notched dramatic come-from-behind victories against his first three opponents, triumphing in the third round via a thrilling five-set victory over 22nd-ranked Viktor Troicki. He then lost to fifth-seeded Stan Wawrinka in four sets, thus failing to advance to the quarterfinal stage, which would have marked a new career-best performance at a major. Prior to his final match of the tournament, some of Young's shoes reportedly went missing from his locker inside the Billie Jean King National Tennis Center.

=== 2016–18: Early success, French Open doubles final ===
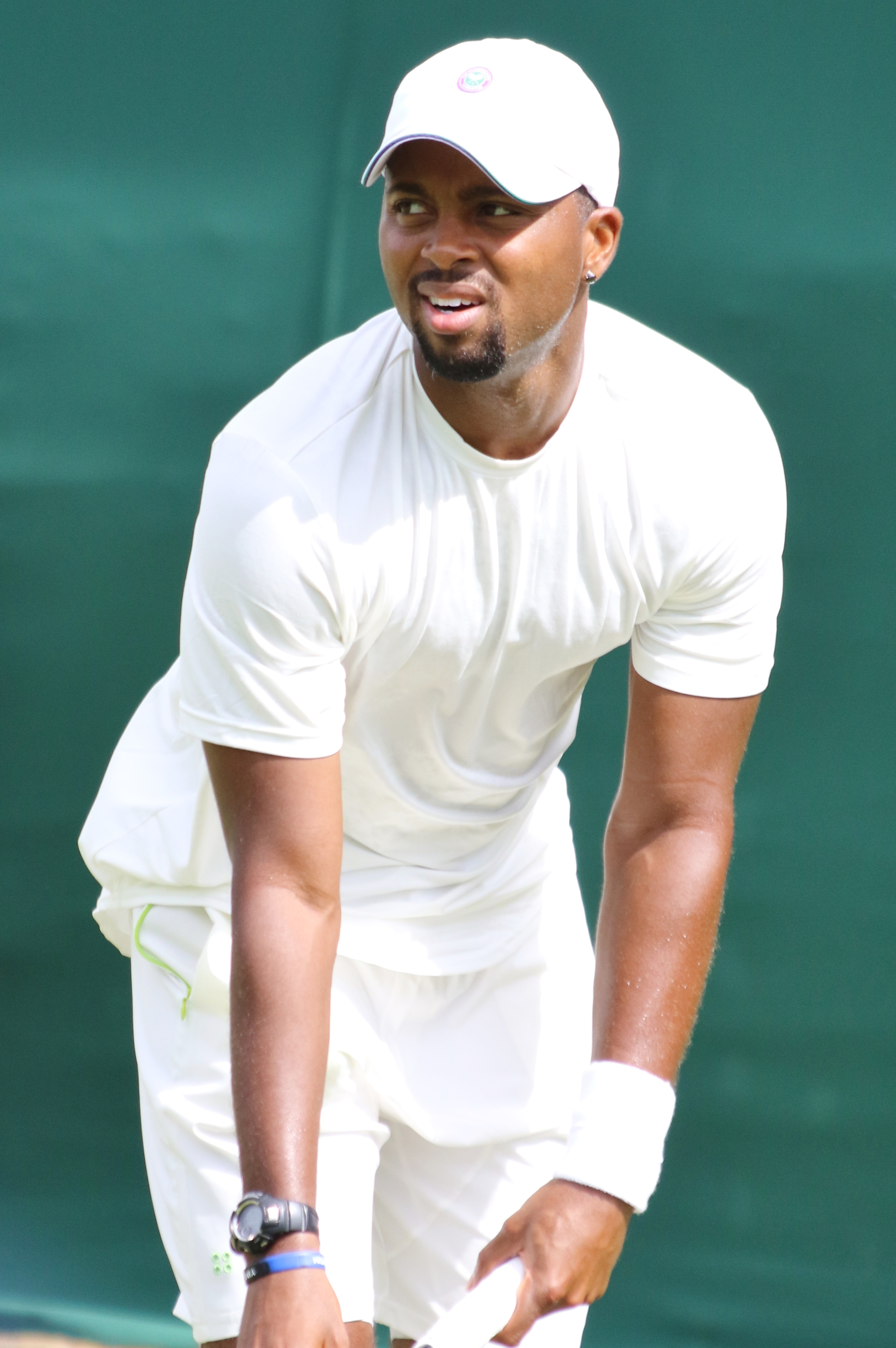
Young at Wimbledon in 2017

2016 was an average year for Young with his best performance coming at the Hall of Fame Open with a semifinal appearance.

In early 2017, Young saw major success. Semifinal appearances at the Delray Beach Open and the Memphis Open were followed up by fourth round appearances at Indian Wells and the Miami Open. These results pushed his ranking to No. 42.

At the French Open, Young partnered with Santiago Gonzalez resulting in a run to the finals. He also registered 100 career singles victories in 2017.

At the 2018 Australian Open, he was the first round opponent for former world No. 1 Novak Djokovic, despite fighting hard he was defeated in straight sets. The US Open was his last major to date. He lost in the first round to eventual finalist, Juan Martín del Potro, in straight sets.

=== 2019–23: Dip in form and rankings ===
In 2019, Young only registered two matches on the ATP Tour which both came in as losses. Throughout 2019–2022, his ranking would plummet all the way down to No. 646. He entered the 2021 Delray Beach Open qualifications as No. 327, his lowest ranking since his early teenage years at No. 335 on 4 June 2007. Ranked No. 646, he entered qualifying also at the 2022 Atlanta Open as a wildcard where he defeated eighth seed J. J. Wolf, before losing in the second round to Dominik Koepfer.

=== 2024: US Open mixed doubles final, retirement ===
Young played his last matches at the US Open partnering Taylor Townsend in mixed doubles, where the duo reached the final. The pair lost in straight sets to Sara Errani and Andrea Vavassori.

== World TeamTennis ==
Young has played four seasons of World TeamTennis, making his debut in 2016 with the Philadelphia Freedoms, and playing another two seasons for the Freedoms in 2017 and 2019. It was announced he will be joining the Philadelphia Freedoms during the 2020 WTT season set to begin July 12.

He paired up with Fabrice Martin in men's doubles for the majority of the season, helping the Freedoms earn a No. 1 seed headed into the WTT Playoffs. The Freedoms would ultimately fall in the semifinals to the New York Empire, who continued on to win the championship.

== Equipment ==
He uses Angell now. He is sponsored by Boast for clothing and K-Swiss for footwear.

== Significant finals ==
=== Grand Slam tournaments ===
==== Doubles: 1 (1 runner-up) ====
Result	Year	Championship	Surface	Partner	Opponents	Score
Loss	2017	French Open	Clay	(Mexico) Santiago González	(United States) Ryan Harrison (New Zealand) Michael Venus	6–7^{(5–7)}, 7–6^{(7–4)}, 3–6

==== Mixed doubles: 1 (1 runner-up) ====
Result	Year	Championship	Surface	Partner	Opponents	Score
Loss	2024	US Open	Hard	(United States) Taylor Townsend	(Italy) Sara Errani (Italy) Andrea Vavassori	6–7^{(0–7)}, 5–7

== ATP Tour finals ==
=== Singles: 2 (2 runner-ups) ===
Legend Grand Slam (0–0) ATP Masters 1000 (0–0) ATP 500 (0–0) ATP 250 (0–2)	Finals by surface Hard (0–2) Clay (0–0) Grass (0–0)	Finals by setting Outdoor (0–1) Indoor (0–1)

Result	W–L	Date	Tournament	Tier	Surface	Opponent	Score
Loss	0–1	Oct 2011	Thailand Open, Thailand	ATP 250	Hard (i)	(United Kingdom) Andy Murray	2–6, 0–6
Loss	0–2	Feb 2015	Delray Beach Open, United States	ATP 250	Hard	(Croatia) Ivo Karlović	3–6, 3–6

=== Doubles: 2 (2 runner-ups) ===
Legend Grand Slam (0–1) ATP Masters 1000 (0–0) ATP 500 (0–0) ATP 250 (0–1)	Finals by surface Hard (0–1) Clay (0–1) Grass (0–0)	Finals by setting Outdoor (0–1) Indoor (0–1)

Result	W–L	Date	Tournament	Tier	Surface	Partner	Opponents	Score
Loss	0–1	Feb 2015	Memphis Open, United States	ATP 250	Hard (i)	(New Zealand) Artem Sitak	(Poland) Mariusz Fyrstenberg (Mexico) Santiago González	7–5, 6–7^{(1–7)}, [8–10]
Loss	0–2	Jun 2017	French Open, France	Grand Slam	Clay	(Mexico) Santiago González	(United States) Ryan Harrison (New Zealand) Michael Venus	6–7^{(5–7)}, 7–6^{(7–4)}, 3–6

== ATP Challenger and ITF Futures finals ==
=== Singles: 18 (9–9) ===
Legend ATP Challenger Tour (8–8) ITF Futures (1–1)	Finals by surface Hard (9–8) Clay (0–1) Grass (0–0) Carpet (0–0)

Result	W–L	Date	Tournament	Tier	Surface	Opponent	Score
Loss	0–1	Jan 2007	USA F1, Tampa	Futures	Hard	(Switzerland) Michael Lammer	6–1, 3–6, 1–6
Win	1–1	Apr 2007	USA F8, Little Rock	Futures	Hard	(Japan) Kei Nishikori	6–2, 6–2
Win	2–1	Jul 2007	Aptos, USA	Challenger	Hard	(United States) Bobby Reynolds	7–5, 6–3
Loss	2–2	Sep 2007	Tulsa, USA	Challenger	Hard	(United States) Jesse Witten	6–7^{(8–10)}, 5–7
Loss	2–3	Oct 2007	Calabasas, USA	Challenger	Hard	(United States) Robert Kendrick	6–3, 6–7^{(4–7)}, 4–6
Loss	2–4	Nov 2007	Louisville, USA	Challenger	Hard (i)	(Germany) Matthias Bachinger	6–0, 5–7, 3–6
Loss	2–5	Nov 2007	Champaign–Urbana, USA	Challenger	Hard (i)	(United States) Jesse Levine	6–7^{(4–7)}, 6–7^{(4–7)}
Win	3–5	Nov 2008	Sacramento, USA	Challenger	Hard	(United States) Robert Kendrick	6–4, 6–1
Loss	3–6	Nov 2008	Louisville, USA	Challenger	Hard (i)	(United States) Robert Kendrick	1–6, 1–6
Loss	3–7	Apr 2009	Tallahassee, USA	Challenger	Clay	(United States) John Isner	5–7, 4–6
Win	4–7	Oct 2009	Calabasas, USA	Challenger	Hard	(United States) Michael Russell	7–6^{(7–4)}, 6–1
Win	5–7	May 2010	Carson, USA	Challenger	Hard	(United States) Robert Kendrick	6–4, 6–4
Loss	5–8	Jul 2010	Aptos, USA	Challenger	Hard	(Australia) Marinko Matosevic	4–6, 2–6
Win	6–8	Apr 2011	Tallahassee, USA	Challenger	Hard	(United States) Wayne Odesnik	6–4, 3–6, 6–3
Loss	6–9	May 2011	Savannah, USA	Challenger	Hard	(United States) Wayne Odesnik	4–6, 4–6
Win	7–9	Apr 2013	León, Mexico	Challenger	Hard	(Chinese Taipei) Jimmy Wang	6–2, 6–2
Win	8–9	Sep 2013	Napa, USA	Challenger	Hard	(Australia) Matthew Ebden	4–6, 6–4, 6–2
Win	9–9	Oct 2013	Sacramento, USA	Challenger	Hard	(United States) Tim Smyczek	7–5, 6–3

=== Doubles: 15 (6-9) ===
Legend ATP Challenger Tour (4–7) ITF Futures (2–2)	Finals by surface Hard (5–8) Clay (1–1) Grass (0–0) Carpet (0–0)

Result	W–L	Date	Tournament	Tier	Surface	Partner	Opponents	Score
Loss	0–1	Jan 2006	USA F1, Tampa	Futures	Hard	(United States) Alex Clayton	(United States) Alex Kuznetsov (Romania) Horia Tecău	6–7^{(9–11)}, 3–6
Win	1–1	Feb 2007	Costa Rica F1, San José	Futures	Hard	(United States) Patrick Briaud	(Slovakia) Matej Bočko (Slovakia) Ján Stančík	6–3, 6–3
Win	2–1	Feb 2007	Joplin, USA	Challenger	Hard	(United States) Patrick Briaud	(United States) Goran Dragicevic (United States) Mirko Pehar	6–4, 6–4
Loss	2–2	Mar 2007	USA F6, McAllen	Futures	Hard	(Canada) Peter Polansky	(United States) Patrick Briaud (United States) Lesley Joseph	5–7, 3–6
Win	3–2	Apr 2007	USA F8, Little Rock	Futures	Hard	(Japan) Kei Nishikori	(United States) Brendan Evans (United States) Brian Wilson	7–6^{(7–5)}, 6–4
Win	4–2	May 2007	Tunica Resorts, USA	Challenger	Clay (i)	(United States) Paul Goldstein	(Uruguay) Pablo Cuevas (Argentina) Horacio Zeballos	4–6, 6–1, [10–4]
Loss	4–3	Aug 2007	Vancouver, Canada	Challenger	Hard	(United States) Alex Kuznetsov	(South Africa) Rik de Voest (Australia) Ashley Fisher	1–6, 2–6
Loss	4–4	Feb 2009	Carson, USA	Challenger	Hard	(United States) Lester Cook	(United States) Scott Lipsky (United States) David Martin	6–7^{(3–7)}, 6–4, [6–10]
Loss	4–5	Oct 2010	Sacramento, USA	Challenger	Hard	(United States) Nicholas Monroe	(South Africa) Rik de Voest (South Africa) Izak van der Merwe	6–4, 4–6, [7–10]
Win	5–5	Nov 2010	Charlottesville, USA	Challenger	Hard (i)	(United States) Robert Kendrick	(United States) Ryler DeHeart (Canada) Pierre-Ludovic Duclos	7–6^{(7–5)}, 7–6^{(7–3)}
Loss	5–6	Oct 2013	Sacramento, USA	Challenger	Hard	(United States) Jarmere Jenkins	(Australia) Matt Reid (Australia) John-Patrick Smith	6–7^{(1–7)}, 6–4, [12–14]
Loss	5–7	Nov 2013	Charlottesville, USA	Challenger	Hard (i)	(United States) Jarmere Jenkins	(United States) Steve Johnson (United States) Tim Smyczek	4–6, 3–6
Win	6–7	Jan 2019	Nouméa, New Caledonia	Challenger	Hard	(Germany) Dustin Brown	(Sweden) André Göransson (Netherlands) Sem Verbeek	7–5, 6–4
Loss	6–8	Jun 2019	Columbus, USA	Challenger	Hard (i)	(Mexico) Hans Hach	(Venezuela) Roberto Maytín (United States) Jackson Withrow	7–6^{(7–4)}, 6–7^{(2–7)}, [5–10]
Loss	6–9	Apr 2021	Tallahassee, USA	Challenger	Clay	(United States) Sekou Bangoura	(Brazil) Orlando Luz (Brazil) Rafael Matos	6-7^{(2-7)}, 2-6

== Performance timelines ==
Key
W	F	SF	QF	#R	RR	Q#	DNQ	A	NH

(W) winner; (F) finalist; (SF) semifinalist; (QF) quarterfinalist; (#R) rounds 4, 3, 2, 1; (RR) round-robin stage; (Q#) qualification round; (DNQ) did not qualify; (A) absent; (NH) not held; (SR) strike rate (events won / competed); (W–L) win–loss record.
To avoid confusion and double counting, these charts are updated at the conclusion of a tournament or when the player's participation has ended.

=== Singles ===
Current through the 2021 Delray Beach Open.

Tournament	2004	2005	2006	2007	2008	2009	2010	2011	2012	2013	2014	2015	2016	2017	2018	2019	2020	2021	SR	W–L	Win %
Grand Slam tournaments
Australian Open	A	A	A	A	1R	A	2R	1R	2R	Q3	3R	2R	1R	2R	1R	Q1	Q1	A	0 / 9	6–9	40%
French Open	A	A	A	A	1R	A	A	A	1R	A	3R	1R	1R	1R	Q1	Q1	A	A	0 / 6	2–6	25%
Wimbledon	A	A	A	A	1R	Q1	Q1	1R	1R	Q1	1R	1R	2R	2R	Q2	Q3	NH	A	0 / 7	2–7	22%
US Open	Q1	1R	1R	3R	1R	1R	1R	4R	1R	2R	1R	4R	2R	2R	1R	Q1	A	A	0 / 14	10–14	42%
Win–loss	0–0	0–1	0–1	1–1	0–4	0–1	1–2	3–3	1–4	1–1	4–4	4–4	2–4	3–4	0–2	0–0	0–0	0–0	0 / 36	20–36	36%
ATP Tour Masters 1000
Indian Wells Masters	A	1R	1R	A	3R	Q1	Q2	3R	1R	A	1R	3R	1R	4R	1R	1R	NH	A	0 / 11	9–11	45%
Miami Masters	A	1R	1R	Q1	Q2	Q1	Q2	1R	1R	A	2R	2R	1R	4R	1R	A	NH	A	0 / 9	5–9	36%
Monte Carlo Masters	A	A	A	A	A	A	A	A	1R	A	A	A	A	A	A	A	NH	A	0 / 1	0–1	0%
Madrid Masters	A	A	A	A	A	A	A	A	1R	A	A	1R	A	A	A	A	A	A	0 / 2	0–2	0%
Rome Masters	A	A	A	A	A	A	A	A	1R	A	A	1R	A	1R	A	A	A	A	0 / 3	0–3	0%
Canada Masters	A	A	A	A	1R	A	A	A	1R	A	2R	3R	2R	1R	A	A	NH	A	0 / 6	4–6	40%
Cincinnati Masters	Q1	A	A	A	1R	Q1	1R	Q1	1R	A	A	A	A	1R	A	A	A	A	0 / 4	0–4	0%
Shanghai Masters	Not Masters Series					A	A	2R	Q1	A	1R	1R	A	Q2	A	A	NH		0 / 3	1–3	25%
Paris Masters	A	A	A	A	A	A	A	1R	A	A	1R	Q1	A	A	A	A	A	A	0 / 2	0–2	0%
Win–loss	0–0	0–2	0–2	0–0	2–3	0–0	0–1	3–4	0–7	0–0	2–5	5–6	1–3	6–5	0–2	0–1	0–0	0–0	0 / 51	19–41	32%
Career statistics
Titles–Finals	0–0	0–0	0–0	0–0	0–0	0–0	0–0	0–1	0–0	0–0	0–0	0–1	0–0	0–0	0–0	0–0	0–0	0–0	0–2		
Overall win–loss	0–0	0–7	0–3	2–3	8–20	0–4	3–6	19–17	5–24	2–3	18–22	22–23	18–21	24–22	3–12	0–2	0–0	0–1	124–190		
Win %	N/A	0%	0%	40%	29%	0%	33%	53%	17%	40%	45%	49%	46%	52%	20%	0%	N/A	0%	39.49%		
Year-end ranking	1272	553	494	100	138	194	127	39	190	96	57	48	88	61	248	230	323	420	$4,670,057		

=== Doubles ===
Tournament	2005	2006	2007	2008	2009	2010	2011	2012	2013	2014	2015	2016	2017	2018	2019	2020	2021	SR	W–L
Grand Slam tournaments
Australian Open	A	A	A	A	A	A	A	1R	A	A	2R	2R	3R	1R	A	A	A	0 / 5	4–5
French Open	A	A	A	A	A	A	A	1R	A	A	2R	A	F	1R	A	A	A	0 / 4	6–4
Wimbledon	A	A	A	A	A	A	A	1R	A	2R	A	1R	1R	A	A	NH	A	0 / 4	1–4
US Open	1R	1R	1R	1R	1R	1R	1R	2R	A	1R	3R	3R	1R	1R	A	A	A	0 / 13	5–13
Win–loss	0–1	0–1	0–1	0–1	0–1	0–1	0–1	1–4	0–0	1–2	4–3	3–3	7–4	0–3	0–0	0–0	0–0	0 / 26	16–26
Career statistics
Titles–Finals	0–0	0–0	0–0	0–0	0–0	0–0	0–0	0–0	0–0	0–0	0–1	0–0	0–1	0–0	0–0	0–0	0–0	0–2	
Year-end ranking	1426	997	208	464	489	246	414	247	389	279	114	172	49	193	233	339	451		

== Wins over top 10 players ==
#	Player	Rank	Event	Surface	Rd	Score	DYR
2011
1.	(United Kingdom) Andy Murray	5	Indian Wells Open, United States	Hard	2R	7–6^{(7–4)}, 6–3	143
2.	(France) Gaël Monfils	9	Thailand Open, Thailand	Hard (i)	SF	4–6, 7–6^{(7–5)}, 7–6^{(7–5)}	55
2015
3.	(Czech Republic) Tomáš Berdych	6	Canadian Open, Canada	Hard	2R	7–6^{(7–5)}, 6–3	79

Awards
Preceded by (France) Gaël Monfils	ITF Junior World Champion; 2005	Succeeded by (Netherlands) Thiemo de Bakker
