= Michael Yani =

American tennis player

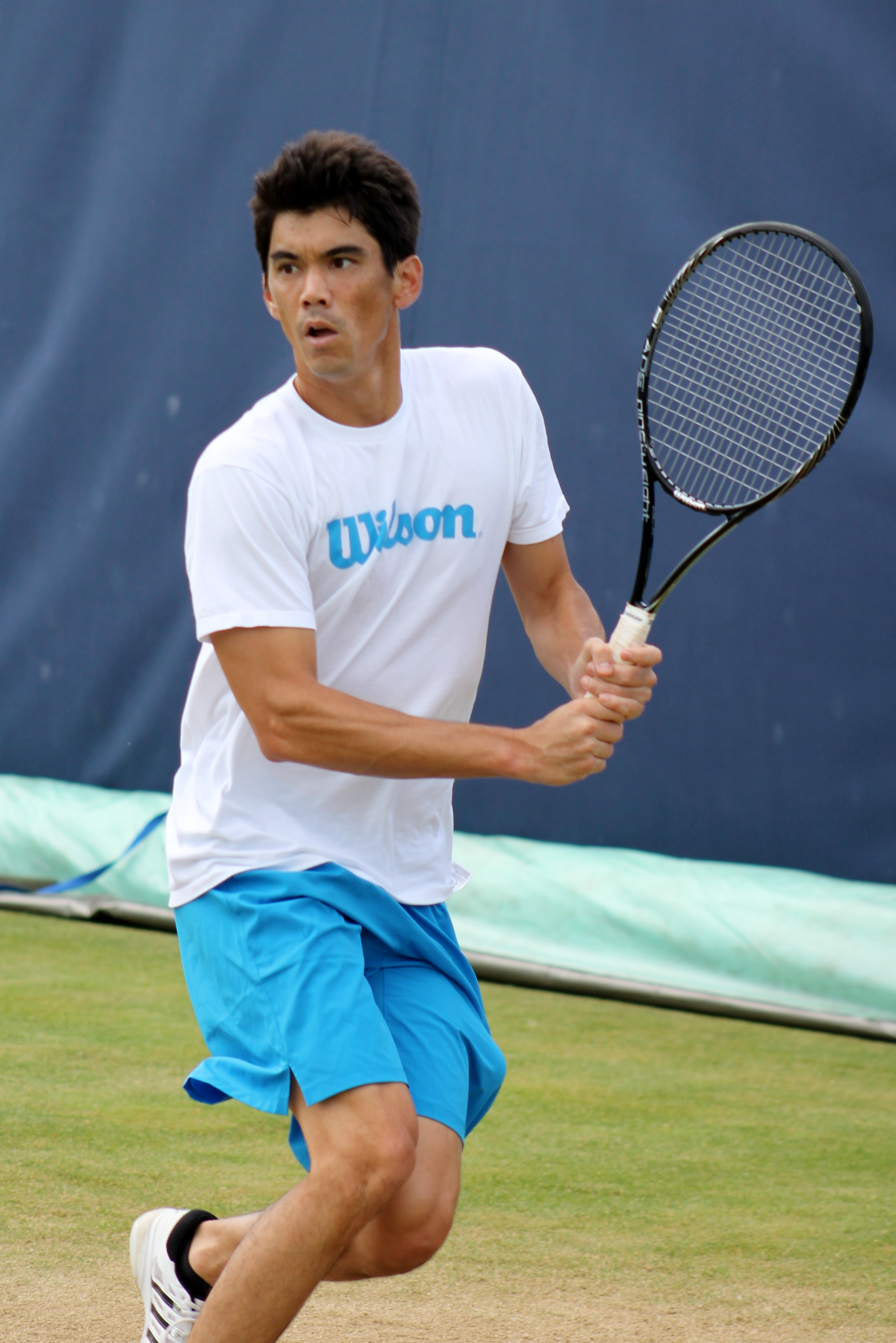
- Michael Yani practicing at Queen's Club, 2013
- Country (sports): United States
- Residence: Honolulu, Hawaii, United States
- Born: December 31, 1980 (age 45) Singapore
- Height: 1.85 m (6.1 ft)
- Turned pro: 2003
- Retired: 2013
- Plays: Right-handed (two-handed backhand)
- Prize money: $403,300

Singles
- Career record: 4–13 (at ATP Tour level, Grand Slam level, and in Davis Cup)
- Career titles: 0
- Highest ranking: No. 143 (March 1, 2010)

Grand Slam singles results
- Australian Open: Q3 (2013)
- French Open: 1R (2010)
- Wimbledon: 1R (2009)
- US Open: 1R (2009, 2011)

Doubles
- Career record: 1–2 (at ATP Tour level and Grand Slam level, and in Davis Cup)
- Career titles: 0
- Highest ranking: No. 158 (May 25, 2009)
- Last updated on: 1 July 2021.

Michael Yani (born December 31, 1980) is a former American tennis player. He turned professional in 2003.

Yani is 6 ft 1 in (185 cm) and 75 kg (165 lb). He resides in Honolulu, Hawaii. After attending on a tennis scholarship, he graduated from Duke University in Durham, North Carolina, where he won All-America honors in 2002 and 2003, and was a 4-year letterman. He went to high school at Saint Andrews in Boca Raton, Florida. His high singles ranking to date is world No. 143, which he reached March 1, 2010.

Yani qualified for the 2009 Wimbledon Championships and 2009 U.S. Open, but lost both times in the first round in straight sets. At the 2010 French Open, he lost a tight match in the first round against Lukáš Lacko, with the score at 6–4, 6–7^{(5)}, 6–7^{(4)}, 7–6^{(5)}, 12–10.

== Performance timeline ==
Key
W	F	SF	QF	#R	RR	Q#	DNQ	A	NH

(W) winner; (F) finalist; (SF) semifinalist; (QF) quarterfinalist; (#R) rounds 4, 3, 2, 1; (RR) round-robin stage; (Q#) qualification round; (DNQ) did not qualify; (A) absent; (NH) not held; (SR) strike rate (events won / competed); (W–L) win–loss record.

=== Singles ===
Tournament	2008	2009	2010	2011	2012	2013	SR	W–L	Win %
Grand Slam tournaments
Australian Open	A	Q1	Q2	Q1	Q1	Q3	0 / 0	0–0	–
French Open	A	A	1R	A	Q1	A	0 / 1	0–1	0%
Wimbledon	A	1R	Q1	A	Q2	Q1	0 / 1	0–1	0%
US Open	Q2	1R	Q2	1R	Q1	A	0 / 2	0–2	0%
Win–loss	0–0	0–2	0–1	0–1	0–0	0–0	0 / 4	0–4	0%
ATP Tour Masters 1000
Indian Wells Masters	A	A	Q1	A	Q2	A	0 / 0	0–0	–
Miami Open	A	A	Q1	A	A	A	0 / 0	0–0	–
Canada Masters	A	A	Q2	1R	A	A	0 / 1	0–1	0%
Cincinnati Masters	1R	A	A	A	A	A	0 / 1	0–1	0%
Shanghai Masters	NH	Q2	A	Q1	A	A	0 / 0	0–0	–
Win–loss	0–1	0–0	0–0	0–1	0–0	0–0	0 / 2	0–2	0%

== ATP Challenger and ITF Futures finals ==
=== Singles: 14 (7–7) ===
Legend ATP Challenger (2–1) ITF Futures (5–6)	Finals by surface Hard (6–6) Clay (1–1) Grass (0–0) Carpet (0–0)

Result	W–L	Date	Tournament	Tier	Surface	Opponent	Score
Win	1–0	Jul 2004	USA F16, Chico	Futures	Hard	(Australia) Mark Hlawaty	6–7^{(2–7)}, 7–6^{(10–8)}, 6–4
Win	2–0	Jun 2005	Japan F5, Munakata	Futures	Hard	(Japan) Go Soeda	7–6^{(7–2)}, 7–6^{(8–6)}
Loss	2–1	Jul 2005	USA F17, Peoria	Futures	Clay	(Romania) Catalin-Ionut Gard	3–6, 4–6
Loss	2–2	Jul 2005	USA F18, Joplin	Futures	Hard	(Brazil) Alexandre Simoni	7–6^{(7–4)}, 3–6, 5–7
Win	3–2	Aug 2005	USA F20, Decatur	Futures	Hard	(United States) Sam Warburg	7–5, 6–4
Loss	3–3	Sep 2005	Japan F9, Kashiwa	Futures	Hard	(Japan) Toshihide Matsui	6–7^{(6–8)}, 3–6
Win	4–3	Jun 2006	USA F13, Woodland	Futures	Hard	(South Africa) Kevin Anderson	3–6, 6–4, 6–3
Win	5–3	Jul 2007	USA F17, Peoria	Futures	Clay	(Australia) Nick Lindahl	6–7^{(5–7)}, 6–3, 6–2
Loss	5–4	Aug 2007	USA F21, Milwaukee	Futures	Hard	(Australia) Matthew Ebden	6–3, 1–6, 5–7
Loss	5–5	Mar 2008	Canada F1, Gatineau	Futures	Hard	(Canada) Erik Chvojka	4–6, 2–6
Win	6–5	Jun 2008	Yuba City, United States	Challenger	Hard	(United States) Sam Warburg	7–6^{(7–5)}, 2–6, 6–3
Loss	6–6	Jun 2008	USA F13, Sacramento	Futures	Hard	(Brazil) Ricardo Hocevar	4–6, 0–6
Loss	6–7	May 2009	Carson, United States	Challenger	Hard	(United States) Michael Russell	1–6, 1–6
Win	7–7	Jul 2012	Binghamton, United States	Challenger	Hard	(South Africa) Fritz Wolmarans	6–4, 7–6^{(13–11)}

=== Doubles: 14 (9–5) ===
Legend ATP Challenger (2–3) ITF Futures (7–2)	Finals by surface Hard (8–5) Clay (0–0) Grass (0–0) Carpet (1–0)

Result	W–L	Date	Tournament	Tier	Surface	Partner	Opponents	Score
Win	1–0	Aug 2001	USA F20, Decatur	Futures	Hard	(United States) Trace Fielding	(United States) Doug Bohaboy (United States) Doug Root	7–6^{(7–4)}, 6–4
Win	2–0	Aug 2004	USA F22, Decatur	Futures	Hard	(United States) Trevor Spracklin	(Australia) Raphael Durek (Australia) Adam Feeney	7–5, 6–3
Loss	2–1	Jan 2005	USA F1, Tampa	Futures	Hard	(United States) Goran Dragicevic	(United States) Alex Kuznetsov (Germany) Mischa Zverev	4–6, 5–7
Win	3–1	May 2005	Japan F3, Shizuoka	Futures	Carpet	(United States) David Martin	(South Korea) Jun Woong-Sun (South Korea) Kim Sun-Yong	2–6, 6–1, 6–4
Win	4–1	May 2005	Thailand F3, Phuket	Futures	Hard	(Australia) Domenic Marafiote	(United States) Phillip King (United States) Trevor Spracklin	6–7^{(4–7)}, 6–4, 6–4
Win	5–1	May 2005	Japan F4, Munakata	Futures	Hard	(United States) Phillip King	(Japan) Katsushi Fukuda (Japan) Yuichi Ito	6–4, 6–4
Win	6–1	Sep 2005	Japan F9, Kashiwa	Futures	Hard	(United States) David Martin	(Chinese Taipei) Chang Kai-Lung (Chinese Taipei) Yi Chu-Huan	6–4, 6–4
Win	7–1	May 2006	Japan F4, Munakata	Futures	Hard	(United States) Troy Hahn	(Poland) Michal Przysiezny (Germany) Mischa Zverev	7–5, 7–5
Win	8–1	Jun 2008	Yuba City, United States	Challenger	Hard	(United States) Nicholas Monroe	(United States) Jan-Michael Gambill (United States) Scott Oudsema	6–4, 6–4
Win	9–1	Jul 2008	Winnetka, United States	Challenger	Hard	(United States) Todd Widom	(Chinese Taipei) Chen Ti (New Zealand) Jose Statham	6–2, 6–2
Loss	9–2	Jul 2008	Aptos, United States	Challenger	Hard	(United States) Todd Widom	(Israel) Noam Okun (Israel) Amir Weintraub	2–6, 1–6
Loss	9–3	Mar 2009	Great Britain F4, Bath	Futures	Hard	(South Africa) Fritz Wolmarans	(United Kingdom) Colin Fleming (United Kingdom) Ken Skupski	4–6, 4–6
Loss	9–4	Jul 2011	Lexington, United States	Challenger	Hard	(United Kingdom) James Ward	(Australia) Jordan Kerr (United States) David Martin	3–6, 4–6
Loss	9–5	Sep 2011	Shanghai, China	Challenger	Hard	(South Africa) Fritz Wolmarans	(Thailand) Sanchai Ratiwatana (Thailand) Sonchat Ratiwatana	6–7^{(4–7)}, 3–6
