= Harsh Mankad =

Indian tennis player

- Country (sports): India
- Residence: Minneapolis, Minnesota, U.S.
- Born: 10 November 1979 (age 46) Bombay, Maharashtra, India
- Height: 1.73 m (5 ft 8 in)
- Turned pro: 2002
- Plays: Right-handed
- Prize money: $ 163,939

Singles
- Career record: 6–13
- Career titles: 0
- Highest ranking: No. 222 (19 December 2005)

Doubles
- Career record: 0–6
- Career titles: 0
- Highest ranking: No. 102 (26 October 2009)

Grand Slam doubles results
- Wimbledon: 1R (2010)
- Parents: Ashok Mankad; Nirupama Mankad

Harsh Mankad (born 10 November 1979) is a former world ranked ATP Professional tennis player from India. He played Davis Cup for India between 2001–2010 and was the No. 1 singles player on the team for several of those years.

== Personal life ==
He is the grandson of world-renowned cricketer Vinoo Mankad, and the son of Indian Test cricketer and Mumbai captain Ashok Mankad and pioneer women's tennis player Nirupama Vasant. Harsh resides in Minneapolis.

== Early career ==
Mankad was the #1 ranked junior tennis player in India, winning National Titles in every age group. Mankad earned a scholarship to the University of Minnesota where he played #1 singles and #1 doubles from 1999 to 2002. He played collegiate tennis at the University of Minnesota. Mankad won the Intercollegiate Tennis Association's National Indoor Tennis Championships in Dallas, Texas in November 2001. He was the first Indian to win this event and consequently secured the No. 1 ranking in the NCAA Division I US tennis rankings for 2001–2002.

== International career ==
On the ATP Tennis Tour, Mankad played against several world #1 ranked players, including Andy Roddick, Andy Murray, Lleyton Hewitt, and other top ranked players such as James Blake, Marcos Baghdatis, and Scheng Schalken. Mankad has been a member of India Davis Cup team for over a dozen Davis Cup ties between Sep 2001 and Oct 2010. He was the highest ranked singles player from India on the ATP Tour in June 2005 (No. 220). He won the Manchester Challenger title in July 2006, becoming the first Indian since Leander Paes to win an ATP Challenger Series title.

Mankad qualified for the main draw of doubles in Wimbledon 2010 partnering Ilija Bozoljac.

== Post-retirement ==
Since retiring from the ATP Tour, Mankad has been the Director of the Tennis Academy at Golden Valley Golf and Country Club in Minneapolis, MN from Feb 2012 - Oct 2013. Mankad instituted several new marketing initiatives as the director and established a premiere tennis academy at the Country Club. He also co-Founded "Tenicity", a web and mobile platform aimed at enhancing the overall quality of a tennis program.
