= Kaes Van't Hof =

American tennis player

- Full name: Kaes Van't Hof
- Country (sports): United States
- Residence: Midland, Texas, U.S.
- Born: August 1, 1986 (age 38); Newport Beach, California, U.S.
- Height: 1.85 m (6 ft 1 in)
- Turned pro: 2008
- Plays: Left-handed (two-handed backhand)
- Prize money: $37,788

Singles
- Career record: 0–0 (0%)
- Career titles: 0
- Highest ranking: No. 605 (November 9, 2009)

Doubles
- Career record: 2–4 (33.3%)
- Career titles: 0
- Highest ranking: No. 155 (November 2, 2009)

Grand Slam doubles results
- US Open: R3 (2009, 2008)

Kaes Van't Hof (born August 1, 1986) is a former tennis player from the United States.

== Early life ==
Van't Hof was born and raised in Newport Beach, California.

== Education ==
Van't Hof was a four year scholarship athlete at the University of Southern California (USC). His senior year, he won the 2008 Pac-10 NCAA Singles Title and the 2008 Pac-10 NCAA Doubles Title with his partner, Farah. In 2008, Van't Hof graduated with a degree in Business Administration.

He and his father Robert became the first father and son to win the intercollegiate singles championship since it was added to the Ojai Tennis Tournament in 1911.

== Professional career ==
Van't Hof played at the 2008 and 2009 U.S. Open reaching the third round of the men's doubles tournament with his partner, Michael McClune.

Since retiring from professional tennis, Van't Hof has worked for Citigroup Global Markets, Wexford Capital, Bison Drilling and Field Services. He is now the CEO and Director of Diamondback Energy.
