= 2009 Sunset Moulding YCRC Challenger – Singles =

Singles
- 2009 Sunset Moulding YCRC Challenger

Final
- Champion: (United States) Ryler DeHeart
- Runner-up: (Australia) Carsten Ball
- Score: 6–2, 3–6, 7–5

Events
Singles	Doubles
← 2008 ·	Sunset Moulding YCRC Challenger	· 2010 →

Michael Yani was the defender of title, but he was eliminated by Carsten Ball in the semifinal.
Ryler DeHeart defeated Ball in the final 6–2, 3–6, 7–5.

== Seeds ==
1. (United States) Vince Spadea (first round)
2. (Thailand) Danai Udomchoke (first round, retired)
3. (United States) Alex Bogomolov Jr. (first round)
4. (United States) Donald Young (second round)
5. (United States) Michael Russell (semifinals, retired)
6. (United States) Sam Warburg (second round)
7. (Australia) Carsten Ball (final)
8. (United States) Todd Widom (first round)

== Draw ==
=== Key ===
- Q = Qualifier
- WC = Wild card
- LL = Lucky loser
- Alt = Alternate
- SE = Special exempt
- PR = Protected ranking
- ITF = ITF entry
- JE = Junior exempt
- w/o = Walkover
- r = Retired
- d = Defaulted
- SR = Special ranking

=== Final four ===
Semifinals
(United States) Ryler DeHeart	4
5	(United States) Michael Russell	3^{r}
7	(Australia) Carsten Ball	6	7
(United States) Michael Yani	1	5

Final
(United States) Ryler DeHeart	6	3	7
7	(Australia) Carsten Ball	2	6	5

=== Top half ===
First round
1	(United States) V Spadea	4	6	2
(Canada) P-L Duclos	6	2	6
WC	(Philippines) C Mamiit	6	6
WC	(United States) N J Andrews	3	1
(Colombia) C Salamanca	6^{5}	3
(United States) R DeHeart	7	6
Q	(United States) T Smyczek	1	4
6	(United States) S Warburg	6	6
3	(United States) A Bogomolov Jr.	6^{1}	0
(Sweden) M Ryderstedt	7	6
Q	(Australia) A Feeney	6	6
(France) D Guez	4	2
(Denmark) F Nielsen	3	6	3
(Republic of Ireland) C Niland	6	0	6
(United States) R Harrison	6	4	5
5	(United States) M Russell	3	6	7

Second round
(Canada) P-L Duclos	6^{6}	1
WC	(Philippines) C Mamiit	7	6
(United States) R DeHeart	6	5	6
6	(United States) S Warburg	1	7	3
(Sweden) M Ryderstedt	3	7	4
Q	(Australia) A Feeney	6	5	6
(Republic of Ireland) C Niland	5	0
5	(United States) M Russell	7	6

Quarterfinals
WC	(Philippines) C Mamiit	7	6^{6}	4
(United States) R DeHeart	5	7	6
Q	(Australia) A Feeney	1	2
5	(United States) M Russell	6	6

Semifinals
(United States) R DeHeart	4
5	(United States) M Russell	3^{r}

=== Bottom half ===
First round
7	(Australia) C Ball	6	6
(Latvia) D Pavlovs	3	2
(Latvia) A Juška	3	3
Q	(South Africa) F Wolmarans	6	6
Q	(United States) A Kuznetsov	5	4
(United States) L Cook	7	6
(Japan) J Mitsuhashi	6^{4}	1
4	(United States) D Young	7	6
8	(United States) T Widom	6^{4}	3
(United States) N Monroe	7	6
(United States) M Yani	7	6
WC	(United States) J Witten	5	4
(Uruguay) M Felder	6	6
(Paraguay) R Delgado	2	0
(United States) E Nunez	5
2	(Thailand) D Udomchoke	2^{r}

Second round
7	(Australia) C Ball	3	6	6
Q	(South Africa) F Wolmarans	6	1	4
(United States) L Cook	6	6
4	(United States) D Young	4	3
(United States) N Monroe	4	0
(United States) M Yani	6	6
(Uruguay) M Felder	6	2	3
(United States) E Nunez	3	6	6

Quarterfinals
7	(Australia) C Ball
(United States) L Cook	w/o
(United States) M Yani	7	6
(United States) E Nunez	6^{5}	2

Semifinals
7	(Australia) C Ball	6	7
(United States) M Yani	1	5
