= 2010 Calabasas Pro Tennis Championships – Singles =

Singles
- 2010 Calabasas Pro Tennis Championships

Final
- Champion: (Australia) Marinko Matosevic
- Runner-up: (United States) Ryan Sweeting
- Score: 2–6, 6–4, 6–3

Events
Singles	Doubles
← 2009 ·	Calabasas Pro Tennis Championships	· 2011 →

Donald Young was the defending champion; however, he was eliminated by Marinko Matosevic in the semifinals.
Matosevic won in the final match 2–6, 6–4, 6–3, against Ryan Sweeting.

== Seeds ==
1. (United States) Donald Young (semifinals)
2. (United States) Ryan Sweeting (final)
3. (United States) Robert Kendrick (semifinals)
4. (Australia) Carsten Ball (first round)
5. (South Africa) Izak van der Merwe (first round)
6. (Australia) Marinko Matosevic (champion)
7. (United States) Kevin Kim (first round)
8. (Australia) John Millman (first round)

== Draw ==
=== Key ===
- Q = Qualifier
- WC = Wild card
- LL = Lucky loser
- Alt = Alternate
- ITF = ITF entry
- PR = Protected ranking
- SR = Special ranking
- SE = Special exempt
- JE = Junior exempt
- JR = Junior Accelerator Programme entrant
- CO = College Accelerator Programme entrant
- NG = Next Gen Accelerator Program entrant
- w/o = Walkover
- r = Retired
- d = Defaulted

=== Finals ===
Semifinals
1	(United States) Donald Young	3	0
6	(Australia) Marinko Matosevic	6	6
3	(United States) Robert Kendrick	6	6^{8}	2
2	(United States) Ryan Sweeting	1	7	6

Final
6	(Australia) Marinko Matosevic	2	6	6
2	(United States) Ryan Sweeting	6	4	3

=== Top half ===
First round
1	(United States) D Young	6	6
(United States) M Yani	1	1
(South Africa) R de Voest	6^{5}	6	1
(Australia) J Lemke	7	0	6
(United Kingdom) J Baker	6	6
WC	(United States) S Johnson	4	2
PR	(Bosnia and Herzegovina) A Delić	6	6
7	(United States) K Kim	3	2
4	(Australia) C Ball	3	3
(Denmark) F Nielsen	6	6
(United States) J Witten	6	6
(United States) M McClune	2	3
(Australia) G Jones	6	6
Q	(United States) D Kosakowski	2	3
(United States) R DeHeart	6	3	2
6	(Australia) M Matosevic	4	6	6

Second round
1	(United States) D Young	6	6
(Australia) J Lemke	4	0
(United Kingdom) J Baker	5	4
PR	(Bosnia and Herzegovina) A Delić	7	6
(Denmark) F Nielsen	7	7
(United States) J Witten	6^{2}	6^{0}
(Australia) G Jones	7	5	1
6	(Australia) M Matosevic	5	7	6

Quarterfinals
1	(United States) D Young	7	7
PR	(Bosnia and Herzegovina) A Delić	5	6^{2}
(Denmark) F Nielsen	3	6^{4}
6	(Australia) M Matosevic	6	7

Semifinals
1	(United States) D Young	3	0
6	(Australia) M Matosevic	6	6

=== Bottom half ===
First round
5	(South Africa) I van der Merwe	4	3
(United States) R Harrison	6	6
(United States) B Reynolds	6	6
(United States) J Levine	3	4
(New Zealand) D King-Turner	6	3	1
WC	(United States) T Smyczek	4	6	6
Q	(Spain) LA Pérez-Pérez	3	5
3	(United States) R Kendrick	6	7
8	(Australia) J Millman	4	4
(United States) L Cook	6	6
(United States) A Kuznetsov	5	5
Q	(Georgia (country)) N Basilashvili	7	7
WC	(South Africa) G Sacks	6	7
WC	(Philippines) C Mamiit	4	5
Q	(United States) N Monroe	2	7	2
2	(United States) R Sweeting	6	6^{6}	6

Second round
(United States) R Harrison	7	6
(United States) B Reynolds	6^{6}	4
WC	(United States) T Smyczek	6	6^{1}	4
3	(United States) R Kendrick	4	7	6
(United States) L Cook	6	7
Q	(Georgia (country)) N Basilashvili	2	5
WC	(South Africa) G Sacks	4	2
2	(United States) R Sweeting	6	6

Quarterfinals
(United States) R Harrison	6^{9}	6	4
3	(United States) R Kendrick	7	4	6
(United States) L Cook	2	0
2	(United States) R Sweeting	6	6

Semifinals
3	(United States) R Kendrick	6	6^{8}	2
2	(United States) R Sweeting	1	7	6
