= 2010 Calabasas Pro Tennis Championships – Doubles =

Doubles
- 2010 Calabasas Pro Tennis Championships

Final
- Champions: (United States) Ryan Harrison (United States) Travis Rettenmaier
- Runners-up: (South Africa) Rik de Voest (United States) Bobby Reynolds
- Score: 6–3, 6–3

Events
Singles	Doubles
← 2009 ·	Calabasas Pro Tennis Championships	· 2011 →

Santiago González and Simon Stadler were the defending champions but decided not to participate.
Ryan Harrison and Travis Rettenmaier won the final 6–3, 6–3, against Rik de Voest and Bobby Reynolds.

== Seeds ==
1. (United States) Ryler DeHeart / (Canada) Pierre-Ludovic Duclos (semifinals)
2. (United States) David Martin / (United States) Travis Parrott (first round)
3. (United States) Ryan Harrison / (United States) Travis Rettenmaier (champions)
4. (South Africa) Rik de Voest / (United States) Bobby Reynolds (final)

== Draw ==
=== Key ===
- Q = Qualifier
- WC = Wild card
- LL = Lucky loser
- Alt = Alternate
- SE = Special exempt
- PR = Protected ranking
- ITF = ITF entry
- JE = Junior exempt
- w/o = Walkover
- r = Retired
- d = Defaulted
- SR = Special ranking

=== Draw ===
First round
1	(United States) R DeHeart (Canada) P-L Duclos	1	6	[17]
(United States) N Monroe (United States) D Young	6	1	[15]
(Canada) P Bester (United States) A Kumar	6	6
WC	(United States) B Joelson (United States) P Simmonds	3	3
4	(South Africa) R de Voest (United States) B Reynolds	6	6
WC	(United States) A Gerst (South Africa) G Sacks	3	2
(Australia) G Jones (United States) J Witten	6	3	[10]
Q	(Canada) C Klingemann (New Zealand) M Venus	0	6	[3]
(United States) A Kuznetsov (United States) T Smyczek	6	6
(Australia) C Ball (Australia) M Matosevic	4	4
WC	(United States) M Ein (United States) K Kim	1	2
3	(United States) R Harrison (United States) T Rettenmaier	6	6
(New Zealand) D King-Turner (Denmark) F Nielsen	6^{5}	6	[4]
(United States) L Cook (Bosnia and Herzegovina) A Delić	7	4	[10]
(United States) JP Fruttero (South Africa) I van der Merwe	2	6	[11]
2	(United States) D Martin (United States) T Parrott	6	3	[9]

Quarterfinals
1	(United States) R DeHeart (Canada) P-L Duclos	6	6
(Canada) P Bester (United States) A Kumar	4	3
4	(South Africa) R de Voest (United States) B Reynolds	6	6
(Australia) G Jones (United States) J Witten	2	4
(United States) A Kuznetsov (United States) T Smyczek	3	3
3	(United States) R Harrison (United States) T Rettenmaier	6	6
(United States) L Cook (Bosnia and Herzegovina) A Delić	1	6^{5}
(United States) JP Fruttero (South Africa) I van der Merwe	6	7

Semifinals
1	(United States) R DeHeart (Canada) P-L Duclos	4	4
4	(South Africa) R de Voest (United States) B Reynolds	6	6
3	(United States) R Harrison (United States) T Rettenmaier	6	7
(United States) JP Fruttero (South Africa) I van der Merwe	2	5

Final
4	(South Africa) R de Voest (United States) B Reynolds	3	3
3	(United States) R Harrison (United States) T Rettenmaier	6	6
