= 2009 KGHM Dialog Polish Indoors – Singles =

Singles
- 2009 KGHM Dialog Polish Indoors

Final
- Champion: (Germany) Michael Berrer
- Runner-up: (Russia) Alexander Kudryavtsev
- Score: 6–3, 6–4

Events
| Singles | Doubles |
| ← 2008 · | KGHM Dialog Polish Indoors | · 2010 → |

Kristof Vliegen was the defending champion; however, he did not take part in the 2009 championships.
Michael Berrer defeated 6–3, 6–4 Alexander Kudryavtsev in the final.

== Seeds ==
1. (Belgium) Olivier Rochus (second round)
2. (France) Adrian Mannarino (first round)
3. (Germany) Michael Berrer (champion)
4. (Slovakia) Karol Beck (semifinals)
5. (United States) Sam Warburg (quarterfinals)
6. (France) Mathieu Montcourt (second round)
7. (Colombia) Santiago Giraldo (quarterfinals)
8. (Russia) Mikhail Elgin (second round)

== Draw ==
=== Key ===
- Q = Qualifier
- WC = Wild card
- LL = Lucky loser
- Alt = Alternate
- SE = Special exempt
- PR = Protected ranking
- ITF = ITF entry
- JE = Junior exempt
- w/o = Walkover
- r = Retired
- d = Defaulted
- SR = Special ranking

=== Final four ===
Semifinals
Q | (Czech Republic) Robin Vik | 3 | 5
3 | (Germany) Michael Berrer | 6 | 7
4 | (Slovakia) Karol Beck | 5 | 6^{4}
LL | (Russia) Alexander Kudryavtsev | 7 | 7

Final
3 | (Germany) Michael Berrer | 6 | 6
LL | (Russia) Alexander Kudryavtsev | 3 | 4

=== Top half ===
First round
1 | (Belgium) O Rochus | 6 | 6
(France) T Ascione | 3 | 1
Q | (Czech Republic) R Vik | 6 | 5 | 7
(Poland) Ł Kubot | 4 | 7 | 6^{5}
(France) A Sidorenko | 6^{8} | 6^{8}
(Germany) D Brands | 7 | 7
(Sweden) B Rehnquist | 4 | 5
6 | (France) M Montcourt | 6 | 7
3 | (Germany) M Berrer | 6 | 6
(Czech Republic) L Rosol | 3 | 2
(Romania) A Cruciat | 7 | 2 | 7
WC | (Poland) J Janowicz | 6^{6} | 6 | 6^{6}
Q | (Austria) P Oswald | 2 | 4
(Czech Republic) L Dlouhý | 6 | 6
(Denmark) K Pless | 6^{6} | 6^{3}
7 | (Colombia) S Giraldo | 7 | 7

Second round
1 | (Belgium) O Rochus | 6^{2} | 5
Q | (Czech Republic) R Vik | 7 | 7
(Germany) D Brands | 6 | 6
6 | (France) M Montcourt | 1 | 4
3 | (Germany) M Berrer | 6 | 6
(Romania) A Cruciat | 1 | 4
(Czech Republic) L Dlouhý | 4 | 6^{2}
7 | (Colombia) S Giraldo | 6 | 7

Quarterfinals
Q | (Czech Republic) R Vik | 6^{1} | 7 | 6
(Germany) D Brands | 7 | 6^{1} | 4
3 | (Germany) M Berrer | 7 | 6
7 | (Colombia) S Giraldo | 5 | 3

Semifinals
Q | (Czech Republic) R Vik | 3 | 5
3 | (Germany) M Berrer | 6 | 7

=== Bottom half ===
First round
8 | (Russia) M Elgin | 6 | 6
(Germany) B Dorsch | 2 | 2
(France) É Roger-Vasselin | 6 | 6
WC | (Poland) M Gawron | 4 | 2
Q | (Romania) V Ioniță | 3 | 4
(Czech Republic) P Šnobel | 6 | 6
(United Kingdom) A Bogdanovic | 2 | 7 | 3
4 | (Slovakia) K Beck | 6 | 6^{3} | 6
5 | (United States) S Warburg | 7 | 7
WC | (Poland) Artur Romanowski | 5 | 5
(Colombia) A Falla | 6 | 5 | 7
WC | (Poland) M Przysiężny | 4 | 7 | 6^{5}
Q | (Poland) D Olejniczak | 4 | 6 | 2
(Thailand) D Udomchoke | 6 | 4 | 6
LL | (Russia) A Kudryavtsev | 3 | 7 | 6
2 | (France) A Mannarino | 6 | 6^{5} | 3

Second round
8 | (Russia) M Elgin | 1 | 4
(France) É Roger-Vasselin | 6 | 6
(Czech Republic) P Šnobel | 1 | 4
4 | (Slovakia) K Beck | 6 | 6
5 | (United States) S Warburg | 7 | 7
(Colombia) A Falla | 5 | 5
(Thailand) D Udomchoke | 6 | 3 | 4
LL | (Russia) A Kudryavtsev | 1 | 6 | 6

Quarterfinals
(France) É Roger-Vasselin | 6^{2} | 4
4 | (Slovakia) K Beck | 7 | 6
5 | (United States) S Warburg | 6^{7} | 4
LL | (Russia) A Kudryavtsev | 7 | 6

Semifinals
4 | (Slovakia) K Beck | 5 | 6^{4}
LL | (Russia) A Kudryavtsev | 7 | 7

== Sources ==
- Main draw
