= 2009 Sunset Moulding YCRC Challenger – Doubles =

Doubles
- 2009 Sunset Moulding YCRC Challenger

Final
- Champions: (Australia) Carsten Ball (United States) Travis Rettenmaier
- Runners-up: (Australia) Adam Feeney (Australia) Nathan Healey
- Score: 6–3, 6–4

Events
Singles	Doubles
← 2008 ·	Sunset Moulding YCRC Challenger	· 2010 →

Nicholas Monroe and Michael Yani were the defending champions, but they chose to not participate together this year.
Monroe partnered up with Brian Battistone and they were eliminated by Carsten Ball and Travis Rettenmaier in the semifinal.
Yani played with Todd Widom. They withdrew before match against Pierre-Ludovic Duclos and Alex Kuznetsov in the quarterfinal, due to Widom's injury.
Ball and Rettenmaier became the new winners, after won in the final, against Adam Feeney and Nathan Healey 6–3, 6–4.

== Seeds ==
1. (Thailand) Sanchai Ratiwatana / (Thailand) Sonchat Ratiwatana (first round)
2. (Australia) Carsten Ball / (United States) Travis Rettenmaier (champions)
3. (United States) Todd Widom / (United States) Michael Yani (quarterfinals, withdrew due to Widom's biceps injury)
4. (United States) Brian Battistone / (United States) Nicholas Monroe (semifinals)

== Draw ==
=== Key ===
- Q = Qualifier
- WC = Wild card
- LL = Lucky loser
- Alt = Alternate
- SE = Special exempt
- PR = Protected ranking
- ITF = ITF entry
- JE = Junior exempt
- w/o = Walkover
- r = Retired
- d = Defaulted
- SR = Special ranking

=== Draw ===
First round
1	(Thailand) Sa Ratiwatana (Thailand) So Ratiwatana	1	4
(Australia) A Feeney (Australia) N Healey	6	6
(India) H Mankad (United States) K Van't Hof	6	4	[5]
(United States) E Nunez (Sweden) M Ryderstedt	4	6	[10]
3	(United States) T Widom (United States) M Yani	7	6
(Uruguay) M Felder (Colombia) C Salamanca	5	3
(Canada) P-L Duclos (United States) A Kuznetsov	6	6
(Australia) A Coelho (Israel) A Weintraub	1	4
WC	(United States) JP Fruttero (Philippines) C Mamiit	7	6^{5}	[10]
WC	(United States) T Smyczek (United States) J Witten	6^{5}	7	[5]
LL	(United States) R DeHeart (Philippines) TC Huey	6	1	[11]
4	(United States) B Battistone (United States) N Monroe	1	6	[13]
Q	(New Zealand) G.D. Jones (United States) S Oudsema	6	4	[5]
WC	(United States) R Harrison (United States) M Venus	3	6	[10]
(Latvia) A Juška (Latvia) D Pavlovs	1	4
2	(Australia) C Ball (United States) T Rettenmaier	6	6

Quarterfinals
(Australia) A Feeney (Australia) N Healey	6	7
(United States) E Nunez (Sweden) M Ryderstedt	4	5
3	(United States) T Widom (United States) M Yani	w/o
(Canada) P-L Duclos (United States) A Kuznetsov
WC	(United States) JP Fruttero (Philippines) C Mamiit	4	4
4	(United States) B Battistone (United States) N Monroe	6	6
WC	(United States) R Harrison (United States) M Venus	6^{2}	4
2	(Australia) C Ball (United States) T Rettenmaier	7	6

Semifinals
(Australia) A Feeney (Australia) N Healey	7	5	[14]
(Canada) P-L Duclos (United States) A Kuznetsov	5	7	[12]
4	(United States) B Battistone (United States) N Monroe	3	6^{5}
2	(Australia) C Ball (United States) T Rettenmaier	6	7

Finals
(Australia) A Feeney (Australia) N Healey	3	4
2	(Australia) C Ball (United States) T Rettenmaier	6	6
