= 2009 Sunset Moulding YCRC Challenger =

- Date: June 1 – June 7
- Edition: 5th
- Surface: Hard
- Location: Yuba City, California, United States

Champions

Singles
- (United States) Ryler DeHeart

Doubles
- (Australia) Carsten Ball / (United States) Travis Rettenmaier
← 2008 ·	Sunset Moulding YCRC Challenger	· 2010 →

The 2009 Sunset Moulding YCRC Challenger was a professional tennis tournament played on hard courts. It was part of the 2009 ATP Challenger Tour. It took place in Yuba City, California, United States between 1 and 7 June 2009.

== Singles entrants ==
=== Seeds ===
Nationality	Player	Ranking*	Seeding
USA	Vince Spadea	105	1
THA	Danai Udomchoke	124	2
USA	Alex Bogomolov Jr.	156	3
USA	Donald Young	162	4
USA	Michael Russell	166	5
USA	Sam Warburg	192	6
AUS	Carsten Ball	197	7
USA	Todd Widom	218	8

- Rankings are as of May 25, 2009.

=== Other entrants ===
The following players received wildcards into the singles main draw:

- (United States) Nicholas John Andrews
- (United States) Ryan Harrison
- (Philippines) Cecil Mamiit
- (United States) Jesse Witten

The following players received entry from the qualifying draw:

- (Australia) Adam Feeney
- (United States) Alex Kuznetsov
- (United States) Tim Smyczek
- (South Africa) Fritz Wolmarans

== Champions ==
=== Singles ===
(United States) Ryler DeHeart def. (Australia) Carsten Ball, 6–2, 3–6, 7–5

=== Doubles ===
(Australia) Carsten Ball / (United States) Travis Rettenmaier def. (Australia) Adam Feeney / (Australia) Nathan Healey, 6–3, 6–4
