= 2017 Wrocław Open – Singles =

Singles
- 2017 Wrocław Open

Final
- Champion: (Austria) Jürgen Melzer
- Runner-up: (Poland) Michał Przysiężny
- Score: 6–4, 6–3

Events
| Singles | Doubles |
| ← 2016 · | Wrocław Open | · 2018 → |

Marco Chiudinelli was the defending champion but chose not to defend his title.

Jürgen Melzer won the title after defeating Michał Przysiężny 6–4, 6–3 in the final.

== Seeds ==
1. (France) Paul-Henri Mathieu (semifinals)
2. (Slovakia) Lukáš Lacko (second round)
3. (France) Kenny de Schepper (quarterfinals)
4. (France) Quentin Halys (semifinals)
5. (Belarus) Ilya Ivashka (first round)
6. (Kazakhstan) Aleksandr Nedovyesov (first round)
7. (Netherlands) Igor Sijsling (second round, retired)
8. (Austria) Jürgen Melzer (champion)

== Draw ==
=== Key ===
- Q = Qualifier
- WC = Wild card
- LL = Lucky loser
- Alt = Alternate
- SE = Special exempt
- PR = Protected ranking
- ITF = ITF entry
- JE = Junior exempt
- w/o = Walkover
- r = Retired
- d = Defaulted
- SR = Special ranking

=== Finals ===
Semifinals
1 | (France) Paul-Henri Mathieu | 6^{4} | 1
8/PR | (Austria) Jürgen Melzer | 7^{7} | 6
4/SE | (France) Quentin Halys | 6^{3} | 5
WC | (Poland) Michał Przysiężny | 7^{7} | 7

Final
8/PR | (Austria) Jürgen Melzer | 6 | 6
WC | (Poland) Michał Przysiężny | 4 | 3

=== Top half ===
First round
1 | (France) P-H Mathieu | 6 | 6
WC | (Poland) K Żuk | 3 | 4
Alt | (Austria) S Ofner | 7^{7} | 6
(United Kingdom) E Corrie | 6^{2} | 2
WC | (Poland) H Hurkacz | 2 | 7 | 5
(France) J Eysseric | 6 | 5 | 7
(Czech Republic) Z Kolář | 6 | 6^{8} | 7^{7}
5 | (Belarus) I Ivashka | 4 | 7^{10} | 6^{1}
3 | (France) K de Schepper | 6 | 6
(Serbia) F Krajinović | 1 | 2
(Netherlands) T Griekspoor | 5 | 6 | 6
(Italy) S Caruso | 7 | 3 | 4
Q | (Czech Republic) Marek Jaloviec | 4 | 2
(Poland) J Janowicz | 6 | 6
Q | (Germany) M Moraing | 4 | 4
8/PR | (Austria) J Melzer | 6 | 6

Second round
1 | (France) P-H Mathieu | 6 | 6
Alt | (Austria) S Ofner | 4 | 2
(France) J Eysseric | 6 | 7^{7}
(Czech Republic) Z Kolář | 4 | 6^{3}
3 | (France) K de Schepper | 6 | 6
(Netherlands) T Griekspoor | 3 | 4
(Poland) J Janowicz | 5 | 6^{6}
8/PR | (Austria) J Melzer | 7 | 7^{8}

Quarterfinals
1 | (France) P-H Mathieu | 6 | 6
(France) J Eysseric | 2 | 4
3 | (France) K de Schepper | 4 | 4
8/PR | (Austria) J Melzer | 6 | 6

Semifinals
1 | (France) P-H Mathieu | 6^{4} | 1
8/PR | (Austria) J Melzer | 7^{7} | 6

=== Bottom half ===
First round
6 | (Kazakhstan) A Nedovyesov | 2 | 6^{2}
(Bosnia and Herzegovina) A Šetkić | 6 | 7^{7}
(Italy) A Arnaboldi | 2 | 4
(Czech Republic) Petr Michnev | 6 | 6
Q | (Switzerland) Y Marti | 6 | 6
Q | (Poland) A Kapaś | 4 | 3
WC | (Poland) Michał Dembek | 3 | 4
4/SE | (France) Q Halys | 6 | 6
7 | (Netherlands) I Sijsling | 6 | 6
(Germany) Jeremy Jahn | 4 | 2
(Czech Republic) V Šafránek | 4 | 2
(Bosnia and Herzegovina) M Bašić | 6 | 6
WC | (Poland) M Przysiężny | 4 | 6 | 7^{7}
(Kazakhstan) A Golubev | 6 | 3 | 6^{5}
(Germany) K Krawietz | 3 | 6^{6}
2 | (Slovakia) L Lacko | 6 | 7^{8}

Second round
(Bosnia and Herzegovina) A Šetkić | 6^{5} | 6^{5}
(Czech Republic) P Michnev | 7^{7} | 7^{7}
Q | (Switzerland) Y Marti | 3 | 4
4/SE | (France) Q Halys | 6 | 6
7 | (Netherlands) I Sijsling | 1 | 0^{r}
(Bosnia and Herzegovina) M Bašić | 6 | 2
WC | (Poland) M Przysiężny | 6 | 3 | 6
2 | (Slovakia) L Lacko | 1 | 6 | 3

Quarterfinals
(Czech Republic) P Michnev | 6^{5} | 2
4/SE | (France) Q Halys | 7^{7} | 6
(Bosnia and Herzegovina) M Bašić | 3 | 4
WC | (Poland) M Przysiężny | 6 | 6

Semifinals
4/SE | (France) Q Halys | 6^{3} | 5
WC | (Poland) M Przysiężny | 7^{7} | 7
