= 2015 Wrocław Open – Singles =

Tennis tournament in Poland

Singles
- 2015 Wrocław Open

Final
- Champion: (Uzbekistan) Farrukh Dustov
- Runner-up: (Bosnia and Herzegovina) Mirza Bašić
- Score: 6–3, 6–4

Events
Singles	Doubles
Wrocław Open	· 2016 →

This is the first edition of the tournament.

== Seeds ==
1. (Lithuania) Ričardas Berankis (semifinals)
2. (Belgium) Steve Darcis (semifinals)
3. (Uzbekistan) Farrukh Dustov (champion)
4. (Kazakhstan) Aleksandr Nedovyesov (first round)
5. (Germany) Matthias Bachinger (first round)
6. (Ukraine) Illya Marchenko (quarterfinals)
7. (Germany) Michael Berrer (quarterfinals)
8. (Belgium) Niels Desein (first round)

== Draw ==
=== Key ===
- Q = Qualifier
- WC = Wild card
- LL = Lucky loser
- Alt = Alternate
- SE = Special exempt
- PR = Protected ranking
- ITF = ITF entry
- JE = Junior exempt
- w/o = Walkover
- r = Retired
- d = Defaulted
- SR = Special ranking

=== Finals ===
Semifinals
1	(Lithuania) Ričardas Berankis	6^{4}	5
Q	(Bosnia and Herzegovina) Mirza Bašić	7^{7}	7
3	(Uzbekistan) Farrukh Dustov	6	3	7
2	(Belgium) Steve Darcis	3	6	5

Final
Q	(Bosnia and Herzegovina) Mirza Bašić	3	4
3	(Uzbekistan) Farrukh Dustov	6	6

=== Top half ===
First round
1	(Lithuania) R Berankis	7^{7}	7
WC	(Poland) H Hurkacz	6^{4}	5
WC	(Poland) Michał Dembek	3	0
WC	(Poland) K Majchrzak	6	6
Q	(Germany) M Marterer	6	6^{3}	6^{1}
(Hungary) M Fucsovics	3	7^{7}	7^{7}
(Slovakia) J Kovalík	4	0
6	(Ukraine) I Marchenko	6	6
4	(Kazakhstan) A Nedovyesov	7^{7}	6^{7}	6^{1}
(Czech Republic) J Mertl	6^{3}	7^{9}	7^{7}
(Croatia) M Delić	4	2
WC	(Poland) A Kapaś	6	6
Q	(Bosnia and Herzegovina) M Bašić	6	6
Q	(Serbia) L Djere	3	4
(Netherlands) J Huta Galung	6	6^{5}	6
5	(Germany) M Bachinger	1	7^{7}	3

Second round
1	(Lithuania) R Berankis	6	6
WC	(Poland) K Majchrzak	4	4
(Hungary) M Fucsovics	4	6^{2}
6	(Ukraine) I Marchenko	6	7^{7}
(Czech Republic) J Mertl	5	6	6
WC	(Poland) A Kapaś	7	3	4
Q	(Bosnia and Herzegovina) M Bašić	7	7^{7}
(Netherlands) J Huta Galung	5	6^{4}

Quarterfinals
1	(Lithuania) R Berankis	6	7^{7}
6	(Ukraine) I Marchenko	3	6^{3}
(Czech Republic) J Mertl	6^{4}	6^{7}	5
Q	(Bosnia and Herzegovina) M Bašić	7^{7}	6^{3}	7

Semifinals
1	(Lithuania) R Berankis	6^{4}	5
Q	(Bosnia and Herzegovina) M Bašić	7^{7}	7

=== Bottom half ===
First round
7	(Germany) M Berrer	4	6	6
(France) A Michon	6	2	3
(Estonia) J Zopp	6	6
(Canada) F Dancevic	4	3
(Czech Republic) J Hernych	6	6
LL	(Austria) M Fischer	3	3
(Germany) P Petzschner	6^{3}	7^{7}	1
3	(Uzbekistan) F Dustov	7^{7}	6^{3}	6
8	(Belgium) N Desein	6^{5}	4
(Slovakia) A Martin	7^{7}	6
(Russia) K Kravchuk	6^{5}	6	6
Q	(Denmark) F Nielsen	7^{7}	2	3
(Poland) Ł Kubot	6	3	6^{4}
(Italy) A Arnaboldi	4	6	7^{7}
(Poland) M Przysiężny	6^{4}	6	6^{5}
2	(Belgium) S Darcis	7^{7}	3	7^{7}

Second round
7	(Germany) M Berrer	6	7^{8}
(Estonia) J Zopp	3	6^{6}
(Czech Republic) J Hernych	6^{7}	5
3	(Uzbekistan) F Dustov	7^{9}	7
(Slovakia) A Martin	4	4
(Russia) K Kravchuk	6	6
(Italy) A Arnaboldi	5	2
2	(Belgium) S Darcis	7	6

Quarterfinals
7	(Germany) M Berrer	5	4
3	(Uzbekistan) F Dustov	7	6
(Russia) K Kravchuk	4	2
2	(Belgium) S Darcis	6	6

Semifinals
3	(Uzbekistan) F Dustov	6	3	7
2	(Belgium) S Darcis	3	6	5
