= 2009 KGHM Dialog Polish Indoors – Doubles =

Doubles
- 2009 KGHM Dialog Polish Indoors

Final
- Champions: (Thailand) Sanchai Ratiwatana (Thailand) Sonchat Ratiwatana
- Runners-up: (Germany) Benedikt Dorsch (United States) Sam Warburg
- Score: 6–4, 3–6, [10–8]

Events
Singles	Doubles
← 2008 ·	KGHM Dialog Polish Indoors	· 2010 →

James Cerretani and Lukáš Rosol were the defending champions. They chose to not participate this year.
Sanchai and Sonchat Ratiwatana defeated Benedikt Dorsch and Sam Warburg 6–4, 3–6, [10–8] in the final.

== Seeds ==
1. (Germany) Michael Kohlmann / (Germany) Philipp Marx (quarterfinals)
2. (Thailand) Sanchai Ratiwatana / (Thailand) Sonchat Ratiwatana (champions)
3. (Romania) Florin Mergea / (Italy) Alessandro Motti (first round)
4. (United Kingdom) James Auckland / (Pakistan) Aisam-ul-Haq Qureshi (quarterfinals)

== Draw ==
=== Key ===
- Q = Qualifier
- WC = Wild card
- LL = Lucky loser
- Alt = Alternate
- SE = Special exempt
- PR = Protected ranking
- ITF = ITF entry
- JE = Junior exempt
- w/o = Walkover
- r = Retired
- d = Defaulted
- SR = Special ranking

=== Draw ===
First round
1	(Germany) M Kohlmann (Germany) P Marx	6	6
(Czech Republic) D Karol (Austria) P Oswald	4	2
WC	(Poland) T Bednarek (Poland) M Przysiężny	4	6	[8]
(Russia) M Elgin (Russia) A Kudryavtsev	6	3	[10]
3	(Romania) F Mergea (Italy) A Motti	6^{5}	7	[7]
(United Kingdom) J Delgado (Colombia) A Falla	7	6^{1}	[10]
(Germany) B Dorsch (United States) S Warburg	7	4	[10]
(Denmark) K Pless (Thailand) D Udomchoke	6^{7}	6	[7]
WC	(Sweden) B Rehnquist (Norway) E Tveit	1	2
(Germany) D Brands (Austria) M Slanar	6	6
(Ukraine) S Bubka (Czech Republic) P Šnobel	6	6^{4}	[8]
4	(United Kingdom) J Auckland (Pakistan) A-u-H Qureshi	3	7	[10]
(France) M Montcourt (France) É Roger-Vasselin	6	6
WC	(Poland) M Gawron (Poland) D Olejniczak	4	3
(France) T Ascione (Belgium) O Rochus	4	4
2	(Thailand) Sa Ratiwatana (Thailand) So Ratiwatana	6	6

Quarterfinals
1	(Germany) M Kohlmann (Germany) P Marx	3	4
(Russia) M Elgin (Russia) A Kudryavtsev	6	6
(United Kingdom) J Delgado (Colombia) A Falla	1	2
(Germany) B Dorsch (United States) S Warburg	6	6
(Germany) D Brands (Austria) M Slanar	7	3	[10]
4	(United Kingdom) J Auckland (Pakistan) A-u-H Qureshi	6^{5}	6	[5]
(France) M Montcourt (France) É Roger-Vasselin	2	4
2	(Thailand) Sa Ratiwatana (Thailand) So Ratiwatana	6	6

Semifinals
(Russia) M Elgin (Russia) A Kudryavtsev	5	6	[13]
(Germany) B Dorsch (United States) S Warburg	7	3	[15]
(Germany) D Brands (Austria) M Slanar	6^{3}	6^{5}
2	(Thailand) Sa Ratiwatana (Thailand) So Ratiwatana	7	7

Finals
(Germany) B Dorsch (United States) S Warburg	4	6	[8]
2	(Thailand) Sa Ratiwatana (Thailand) So Ratiwatana	6	3	[10]
