= 2016 Wrocław Open – Doubles =

Doubles
- 2016 Wrocław Open

Final
- Champions: (France) Pierre-Hugues Herbert (France) Albano Olivetti
- Runners-up: (Croatia) Nikola Mektić (Croatia) Antonio Šančić
- Score: 6–3 , 7–6^{(7–4)}

Events
Singles	Doubles
← 2015 ·	Wrocław Open	· 2017 →

Philipp Petzschner and Tim Pütz are the defending champions, but decided not to defend their title .

Pierre-Hugues Herbert and Albano Olivetti won the title, defeating Nikola Mektic and Antonio Sancic in the final 6–3, 7–6^{(7–4)} .

== Seeds ==
1. (United Kingdom) Ken Skupski / (United Kingdom) Neal Skupski (semifinals)
2. (Germany) Dustin Brown / (Czech Republic) František Čermák (semifinals)
3. (Croatia) Nikola Mektić / (Croatia) Antonio Šančić (final)
4. (Croatia) Dino Marcan / (Austria) Maximilian Neuchrist (withdrew)

== Draw ==
=== Key ===
- Q = Qualifier
- WC = Wild card
- LL = Lucky loser
- Alt = Alternate
- SE = Special exempt
- PR = Protected ranking
- ITF = ITF entry
- JE = Junior exempt
- w/o = Walkover
- r = Retired
- d = Defaulted
- SR = Special ranking

First round
1	(United Kingdom) K Skupski (United Kingdom) N Skupski	6	6
WC	(Norway) F Ask (Poland) S Walków	1	4
(Switzerland) M Chiudinelli (Germany) J-L Struff	6	3	[6]
(Italy) A Arnaboldi (Uzbekistan) F Dustov	4	6	[10]
Alt	(Kazakhstan) A Golubev (Kazakhstan) A Nedovyesov	4	3
(Russia) A Kudryavtsev (Ukraine) D Molchanov	6	6
PR	(France) P-H Herbert (France) A Olivetti	7^{7}	6
WC	(Poland) K Drzewiecki (Poland) A Majchrowicz	6^{3}	4
(United States) M Seeberger (Netherlands) M Vervoort	2	4
(Bosnia and Herzegovina) M Bašić (Serbia) I Bozoljac	6	6
(Netherlands) S Arends (Australia) J Thompson	6^{5}	6^{4}
3	(Croatia) N Mektić (Croatia) A Šančić	7^{7}	7^{7}
PR	(Czech Republic) R Jebavý (Slovakia) L Lacko	6	6
(Belarus) S Betov (Belarus) E Gerasimov	3	4
WC	(Poland) H Hurkacz (Poland) K Majchrzak	7	4	[4]
2	(Germany) D Brown (Czech Republic) F Čermák	5	6	[10]

Quarterfinals
1	(United Kingdom) K Skupski (United Kingdom) N Skupski	6	3	[10]
(Italy) A Arnaboldi (Uzbekistan) F Dustov	3	6	[6]
(Russia) A Kudryavtsev (Ukraine) D Molchanov	6^{3}	6^{3}
PR	(France) P-H Herbert (France) A Olivetti	7^{7}	7^{7}
(Bosnia and Herzegovina) M Bašić (Serbia) I Bozoljac	7^{7}	0^{r}
3	(Croatia) N Mektić (Croatia) A Šančić	6^{1}	1
PR	(Czech Republic) R Jebavý (Slovakia) L Lacko	1	2
2	(Germany) D Brown (Czech Republic) F Čermák	6	6

Semifinals
1	(United Kingdom) K Skupski (United Kingdom) N Skupski	7^{7}	4	[8]
PR	(France) P-H Herbert (France) A Olivetti	6^{4}	6	[10]
3	(Croatia) N Mektić (Croatia) A Šančić	7^{8}	6
2	(Germany) D Brown (Czech Republic) F Čermák	6^{6}	3

Final
PR	(France) P-H Herbert (France) A Olivetti	6	7^{7}
3	(Croatia) N Mektić (Croatia) A Šančić	3	6^{4}
