= 2009 Calabasas Pro Tennis Championships – Doubles =

Doubles
- 2009 Calabasas Pro Tennis Championships

Final
- Champions: (Mexico) Santiago González (Germany) Simon Stadler
- Runners-up: (Philippines) Treat Conrad Huey (India) Harsh Mankad
- Score: 6–2, 5–7, [10–4]

Events
Singles	Doubles
← 2008 ·	Calabasas Pro Tennis Championships	· 2010 →

Ilija Bozoljac and Dušan Vemić were the defending champions and they tried to defend their title. Unfortunately, they retired in his match against Mark Ein and Kevin Kim already in the first round (when the result was 2–1 for American pair).
Santiago González and Simon Stadler defeated Treat Conrad Huey and Harsh Mankad 6–2, 5–7, [10–4] in the final match.

== Seeds ==
1. (United States) Lester Cook / (United States) David Martin (quarterfinals)
2. (Serbia) Ilija Bozoljac / (Serbia) Dušan Vemić (first round, retired)
3. (Philippines) Treat Conrad Huey / (India) Harsh Mankad (final)
4. (India) Prakash Amritraj / (United States) Alex Kuznetsov (quarterfinals)

== Draw ==
=== Key ===
- Q = Qualifier
- WC = Wild card
- LL = Lucky loser
- Alt = Alternate
- ITF = ITF entry
- PR = Protected ranking
- SR = Special ranking
- SE = Special exempt
- JE = Junior exempt
- JR = Junior Accelerator Programme entrant
- CO = College Accelerator Programme entrant
- NG = Next Gen Accelerator Program entrant
- w/o = Walkover
- r = Retired
- d = Defaulted

=== Draw ===
First round
1	(United States) L Cook (United States) D Martin	6	6
Q	(Bulgaria) BN Bakalov (Germany) C-M Stebe	3	4
WC	(United States) G Ouellette (United States) D Young	6	6^{4}	[7]
(Mexico) S González (Germany) S Stadler	4	7	[10]
4	(India) P Amritraj (United States) A Kuznetsov	6^{1}	6	[10]
(United States) R Rizza (United States) K Van't Hof	7	2	[8]
(South Africa) R Klaasen (South Africa) I van der Merwe	6	6
(Armenia) T Martirosyan (United States) J Witten	3	3
(Colombia) A González (Spain) F Vicente	3	3
WC	(United States) B Battistone (United States) D Battistone	6	6
(Croatia) R Karanušić (Slovenia) G Žemlja	6^{4}	6	[4]
3	(Philippines) TC Huey (India) H Mankad	7	4	[10]
(Australia) N Lindahl (Australia) M Matosevic	0	r
LL	(Venezuela) G Sánchez (United States) C Schwartz	2
WC	(United States) M Ein (United States) K Kim	2
2	(Serbia) I Bozoljac (Serbia) D Vemić	1	r

Quarterfinals
1	(United States) L Cook (United States) D Martin	4	6^{3}
(Mexico) S González (Germany) S Stadler	6	7
4	(India) P Amritraj (United States) A Kuznetsov	2	3
(South Africa) R Klaasen (South Africa) I van der Merwe	6	6
WC	(United States) B Battistone (United States) D Battistone	2	2
3	(Philippines) TC Huey (India) H Mankad	6	6
LL	(Venezuela) G Sánchez (United States) C Schwartz	6	6
WC	(United States) M Ein (United States) K Kim	4	0

Semifinals
(Mexico) S González (Germany) S Stadler	4	6	[10]
(South Africa) R Klaasen (South Africa) I van der Merwe	6	4	[5]
3	(Philippines) TC Huey (India) H Mankad	6	6
LL	(Venezuela) G Sánchez (United States) C Schwartz	4	0

Finals
(Mexico) S González (Germany) S Stadler	6	5	[10]
3	(Philippines) TC Huey (India) H Mankad	2	7	[4]
