= 2009 Tail Savannah Challenger – Singles =

Singles
- 2009 Tail Savannah Challenger

Final
- Champion: (United States) Michael Russell
- Runner-up: (United States) Alex Kuznetsov
- Score: 6–4, 7–6(6)

Events
Singles	Doubles
- Tail Savannah Challenger

Michael Russell won the first edition of this tournament, after he beat Alex Kuznetsov in the final 6–4, 7–6(6).

== Seeds ==
1. (United States) Kevin Kim (semifinals)
2. (United States) Vince Spadea (first round)
3. (United States) John Isner (quarterfinals)
4. (United States) Jesse Levine (semifinals)
5. (United States) Donald Young (first round)
6. (Australia) Carsten Ball (second round)
7. (France) Éric Prodon (first round)
8. (Argentina) ~~Mariano Puerta~~ (withdrew)
9. (United States) Scoville Jenkins (first round, retired)

== Draw ==
Key

- Q = Qualifier
- WC = Wild card
- LL = Lucky loser
- Alt = Alternate
- ITF = ITF entry
- PR = Protected ranking
- SR = Special ranking
- SE = Special exempt
- JE = Junior exempt
- JR = Junior Accelerator Programme entrant
- CO = College Accelerator Programme entrant
- NG = Next Gen Accelerator Program entrant
- w/o = Walkover
- r = Retired
- d = Defaulted

=== Final four ===
Semifinals
1	(United States) Kevin Kim	7	3	6^{4}
(United States) Alex Kuznetsov	6^{7}	6	7
4	(United States) Jesse Levine	2	4
(United States) Michael Russell	6	6

Final
(United States) Alex Kuznetsov	4	6^{6}
(United States) Michael Russell	6	7

=== Top half ===
First round
1	(United States) K Kim	4	6	7
(United States) L Cook	6	2	5
WC	(United States) N Monroe	2	7	4
Q	(United States) C Klingemann	6	5	6
(Venezuela) J de Armas	6^{2}	6	3
WC	(South Africa) F Wolmarans	7	3	6
(Australia) M Ebden	6	7
7	(France) É Prodon	4	6^{4}
3	(United States) J Isner	6	1	7
(Paraguay) R Delgado	3	6	6^{2}
(United Kingdom) J Ward	6	6
Q	(United States) T Smyczek	2	4
(Armenia) T Martirosyan	1	0
(United States) A Kuznetsov	6	6
(Dominican Republic) V Estrella	2	7	6^{4}
6	(Australia) C Ball	6	6^{3}	7

Second round
1	(United States) K Kim	6	6
Q	(United States) C Klingemann	1	1
WC	(South Africa) F Wolmarans	6	4
(Australia) M Ebden	4	2	r
3	(United States) J Isner	7	7
(United Kingdom) J Ward	6^{4}	5
(United States) A Kuznetsov	6	5	7
6	(Australia) C Ball	3	7	6^{3}

Quarterfinals
1	(United States) K Kim	6	6
WC	(South Africa) F Wolmarans	4	4
3	(United States) J Isner	7	2	5
(United States) A Kuznetsov	6^{3}	6	7

Semifinals
1	(United States) K Kim	7	3	6^{3}
(United States) A Kuznetsov	6^{7}	6	7

=== Bottom half ===
First round
5	(United States) D Young	6	0	4
(France) J Dasnières de Veigy	3	6	6
(Uruguay) M Felder	6	6
(Colombia) M Quintero	1	4
(Argentina) M Zabaleta	2	7	6
(Mexico) S González	6	5	3
LL	(Czech Republic) A Vejmělka	4	1
4	(United States) J Levine	6	6
9	(United States) S Jenkins	2	r
WC	(United States) J Witten	0
(United States) R DeHeart	7	6
WC	(United States) S Bass	6^{4}	4
(Italy) E Burzi	2	6	7
Q	(Lithuania) R Berankis	6	4	5
(United States) M Russell	6	7
2	(United States) V Spadea	2	5

Second round
(France) J Dasnières de Veigy	3	3
(Uruguay) M Felder	6	6
(Argentina) M Zabaleta	3	6	6^{5}
4	(United States) J Levine	6	3	7
WC	(United States) J Witten	7	1	5
(United States) R DeHeart	6^{6}	6	7
(Italy) E Burzi	4	5
(United States) M Russell	6	7

Quarterfinals
(Uruguay) M Felder	2	6	1
4	(United States) J Levine	6	4	6
(United States) R DeHeart	2	0
(United States) M Russell	6	6

Semifinals
4	(United States) J Levine	2	4
(United States) M Russell	6	6
