= 2009 KGHM Dialog Polish Indoors =

- Date: February 2 – February 8
- Edition: 10th
- Location: Wrocław, Poland

Champions

Singles
- (Germany) Michael Berrer

Doubles
- (Thailand) Sanchai Ratiwatana / (Thailand) Sonchat Ratiwatana
← 2008 ·	KGHM Dialog Polish Indoors	· 2010 →

The 2009 KGHM Dialog Polish Indoors was a professional tennis tournament played on hard courts. It was part of the Tretorn SERIE+ of the 2009 ATP Challenger Tour. It was taking place in Wrocław, Poland between 2 and 8 February 2009.

== Singles main-draw entrants ==
=== Seeds ===
Country	Player	Rank	Seed
BEL	Olivier Rochus	119	1
FRA	Adrian Mannarino	129	2
GER	Michael Berrer	134	3
SVK	Karol Beck	140	4
USA	Sam Warburg	144	5
FRA	Mathieu Montcourt	145	6
COL	Santiago Giraldo	150	7
RUS	Mikhail Elgin	151	8

- Rankings are as of January 19, 2009.

=== Other entrants ===
The following players received wildcards into the singles main draw:

- (Poland) Marcin Gawron
- (Poland) Jerzy Janowicz
- (Poland) Michał Przysiężny
- (Poland) Artur Romanowski

The following players received entry from the qualifying draw:

- (Romania) Victor Ioniță
- (Poland) Dawid Olejniczak
- (Austria) Philipp Oswald
- (Czech Republic) Robin Vik
- (Russia) Alexander Kudryavtsev (as a Lucky loser)

== Champions ==
=== Men's singles ===
(Germany) Michael Berrer def. (Russia) Alexander Kudryavtsev, 6–3, 6–4

=== Men's doubles ===
(Thailand) Sanchai Ratiwatana / (Thailand) Sonchat Ratiwatana def. (Germany) Benedikt Dorsch / (United States) Sam Warburg, 6–4, 3–6, [10–8]
