= 2010 Calabasas Pro Tennis Championships =

- Date: 18–24 October
- Edition: 10th
- Location: Calabasas, United States

Champions

Singles
- (Australia) Marinko Matosevic

Doubles
- (United States) Ryan Harrison / (United States) Travis Rettenmaier
← 2009 ·	Calabasas Pro Tennis Championships	· 2011 →

The 2010 Calabasas Pro Tennis Championships was a professional tennis tournament played on hard courts. It was the tenth edition of the tournament which was part of the 2010 ATP Challenger Tour. It took place in Calabasas, United States between 18 and 24 October 2010.

== ATP entrants ==
=== Seeds ===
Country	Player	Rank^{1}	Seed
USA	Donald Young	111	1
USA	Ryan Sweeting	115	2
USA	Robert Kendrick	147	3
AUS	Carsten Ball	154	4
RSA	Izak van der Merwe	158	5
AUS	Marinko Matosevic	163	6
USA	Kevin Kim	176	7
AUS	John Millman	179	8

- Rankings are as of October 11, 2010.

=== Other entrants ===
The following players received wildcards into the singles main draw:

- (United States) Steve Johnson
- (Philippines) Cecil Mamiit
- (South Africa) Gary Sacks
- (United States) Tim Smyczek

The following players received entry from the qualifying draw:

- (Georgia (country)) Nikoloz Basilashvili
- (United States) Daniel Kosakowski
- (United States) Nicholas Monroe
- (Spain) Luís Antonio Pérez-Pérez

== Champions ==
=== Singles ===
(Australia) Marinko Matosevic def. (United States) Ryan Sweeting, 2–6, 6–4, 6–3

=== Doubles ===
(United States) Ryan Harrison / (United States) Travis Rettenmaier def. (South Africa) Rik de Voest / (United States) Bobby Reynolds, 6–3, 6–3
