= 2009 Calabasas Pro Tennis Championships – Singles =

Singles
- 2009 Calabasas Pro Tennis Championships

Final
- Champion: (United States) Donald Young
- Runner-up: (United States) Michael Russell
- Score: 7–6(4), 6–1

Events
Singles	Doubles
← 2008 ·	Calabasas Pro Tennis Championships	· 2010 →

Vince Spadea was the defending champion, but he was eliminated by qualifier Luka Gregorc already in the first round.
Donald Young defeated his compatriot Michael Russell 7–6(4), 6–1 in the final.

== Seeds ==
1. (United States) Kevin Kim (second round)
2. (United States) Michael Russell (final)
3. (United States) Jesse Levine (second round, withdrew due to a hip flexor strain)
4. (Colombia) Santiago Giraldo (second round)
5. (United States) Taylor Dent (second round)
6. (Croatia) Roko Karanušić (first round)
7. (Slovenia) Grega Žemlja (quarterfinals)
8. (Colombia) Carlos Salamanca (first round)

== Draw ==
=== Key ===
- Q = Qualifier
- WC = Wild card
- LL = Lucky loser
- Alt = Alternate
- ITF = ITF entry
- PR = Protected ranking
- SR = Special ranking
- SE = Special exempt
- JE = Junior exempt
- JR = Junior Accelerator Programme entrant
- CO = College Accelerator Programme entrant
- NG = Next Gen Accelerator Program entrant
- w/o = Walkover
- r = Retired
- d = Defaulted

=== Finals ===
Semifinals
(United States) Donald Young	6	6
(United States) Michael Yani	3	1
Q	(Philippines) Cecil Mamiit	1	6^{6}
2	(United States) Michael Russell	6	7

Final
(United States) Donald Young	6	6
2	(United States) Michael Russell	4	3

=== Top half ===
First round
1	(United States) K Kim	6	6
(United States) T Widom	1	4
(United States) V Spadea	3	7	4
Q	(Slovenia) L Gregorc	6	6^{4}	6
Q	(Republic of Ireland) L Sorensen	6	2	2
(United States) D Young	4	6	6
(Italy) R Ghedin	3	4
5	(United States) T Dent	6	6
3	(United States) J Levine	7	6
(Uruguay) M Felder	6^{1}	0
WC	(India) P Amritraj	6	6
(Serbia) I Bozoljac	3	2
WC	(South Africa) G Sacks	7	2	2
WC	(United States) B Klahn	6^{4}	6	6
(United States) M Yani	6	6
6	(Croatia) R Karanušić	3	4

Second round
1	(United States) K Kim	4	3
Q	(Slovenia) L Gregorc	6	6
(United States) D Young	6	6
5	(United States) T Dent	3	2
3	(United States) J Levine	w/o
WC	(India) P Amritraj
WC	(United States) B Klahn	6^{6}	7	6^{5}
(United States) M Yani	7	6^{4}	7

Quarterfinals
Q	(Slovenia) L Gregorc	3	1
(United States) D Young	6	6
WC	(India) P Amritraj	2	2
(United States) M Yani	6	6

Semifinals
(United States) D Young	6	6
(United States) M Yani	3	1

=== Bottom half ===
First round
8	(Colombia) C Salamanca	6	5	1
(Australia) M Matosevic	3	7	6
Q	(Philippines) C Mamiit	5	6	6
(Switzerland) M Lammer	7	2	1
(United States) L Cook	3	1
(Mexico) S González	6	6
(Japan) G Soeda	6^{4}	6	6
4	(Colombia) S Giraldo	7	4	4
7	(Slovenia) G Žemlja	6	6
ALT	(Colombia) A González	2	0
(Australia) N Lindahl	6	6
WC	(United States) S Johnson	4	4
(United States) J Witten	6^{3}	2
(United States) A Kuznetsov	7	6
Q	(Spain) F Vicente	4	4
2	(United States) M Russell	6	6

Second round
(Australia) M Matosevic	4	3
Q	(Philippines) C Mamiit	6	6
(Mexico) S González	4	2
(Japan) G Soeda	6	6
7	(Slovenia) G Žemlja	6
(Australia) N Lindahl	2	r
(United States) A Kuznetsov	2	6	0
2	(United States) M Russell	6	4	6

Quarterfinals
Q	(Philippines) C Mamiit	6	6
(Japan) G Soeda	4	2
7	(Slovenia) G Žemlja	2	4
2	(United States) M Russell	6	6

Semifinals
Q	(Philippines) C Mamiit	1	6^{6}
2	(United States) M Russell	6	7
