= 2009 Tail Savannah Challenger – Doubles =

Doubles
- 2009 Tail Savannah Challenger

Final
- Champions: (Australia) Carsten Ball (United States) Travis Rettenmaier
- Runners-up: (India) Harsh Mankad (United States) Kaes Van't Hof
- Score: 7–6(4), 6–4

Events
Singles	Doubles
- Tail Savannah Challenger

Carsten Ball and Travis Rettenmaier won in the final 7-6^{4}, 6–4 against Harsh Mankad and Kaes Van't Hof

== Seeds ==
1. (Australia) Carsten Ball / (United States) Travis Rettenmaier (champions)
2. (United States) Brian Battistone / (United States) Nicholas Monroe (quarterfinals)
3. (India) Harsh Mankad / (United States) Kaes Van't Hof (final)
4. (Dominican Republic) Víctor Estrella / (Uruguay) Marcel Felder (semifinals, withdrew)

== Draw ==
Key

- Q = Qualifier
- WC = Wild card
- LL = Lucky loser
- Alt = Alternate
- ITF = ITF entry
- PR = Protected ranking
- SR = Special ranking
- SE = Special exempt
- JE = Junior exempt
- JR = Junior Accelerator Programme entrant
- CO = College Accelerator Programme entrant
- NG = Next Gen Accelerator Program entrant
- w/o = Walkover
- r = Retired
- d = Defaulted

=== Draw ===
First round
1	(Australia) C Ball (United States) T Rettenmaier	6	3	[10]
(United States) L Cook (United States) K Kim	4	6	[7]
Q	(Lithuania) R Berankis (Romania) R Luchici	1	2
WC	(United States) S Bass (United States) C Klingemann	6	6
4	(Dominican Republic) V Estrella (Uruguay) M Felder	7	6
(Serbia) V Obradović (United States) D Young	5	4
(Armenia) T Martirosyan (United States) J Witten	7	6
(Italy) E Burzi (Czech Republic) A Vejmělka	6^{4}	2
(Australia) M Ebden (United Kingdom) J Ward	w/o
(United States) R DeHeart (Philippines) TC Huey
WC	(United Kingdom) P Bishop (Estonia) M Irdoja	6^{2}	4
3	(India) H Mankad (United States) K Van't Hof	7	6
WC	(United States) A Kuznetsov (South Africa) F Wolmarans	7	6
(France) J Dasnières de Veigy (France) É Prodon	6^{3}	4
(Paraguay) R Delgado (Mexico) S González	4	4
2	(United States) B Battistone (United States) N Monroe	6	6

Quarterfinals
1	(Australia) C Ball (United States) T Rettenmaier	6	6
WC	(United States) S Bass (United States) C Klingemann	0	4
4	(Dominican Republic) V Estrella (Uruguay) M Felder	7	6
(Armenia) T Martirosyan (United States) J Witten	5	3
(United States) R DeHeart (Philippines) TC Huey	6	4	[5]
3	(India) H Mankad (United States) K Van't Hof	2	6	[10]
WC	(United States) A Kuznetsov (South Africa) F Wolmarans	6	6
2	(United States) B Battistone (United States) N Monroe	2	3

Semifinals
1	(Australia) C Ball (United States) T Rettenmaier
4	(Dominican Republic) V Estrella (Uruguay) M Felder	w/o
3	(India) H Mankad (United States) K Van't Hof	6	6
WC	(United States) A Kuznetsov (South Africa) F Wolmarans	4	1

Finals
1	(Australia) C Ball (United States) T Rettenmaier	7	6
3	(India) H Mankad (United States) K Van't Hof	6^{4}	4
