= 2016 Wrocław Open – Singles =

Singles
- 2016 Wrocław Open

Final
- Champion: (Switzerland) Marco Chiudinelli
- Runner-up: (Czech Republic) Jan Hernych
- Score: 6–3 , 7–6^{(11–9)}

Events
Singles	Doubles
← 2015 ·	Wrocław Open	· 2017 →

Farrukh Dustov was the defending champion, but lost to Jürgen Zopp in the second round .

Marco Chiudinelli won the title, defeating Jan Hernych in the final 6–3, 7–6^{(11–9)} .

== Seeds ==
1. (Russia) Evgeny Donskoy (quarterfinals)
2. (Germany) Dustin Brown (semifinals)
3. (Germany) Jan-Lennard Struff (first round)
4. (Slovakia) Lukáš Lacko (second round)
5. (Bosnia and Herzegovina) Mirza Bašić (second round)
6. (Germany) Michael Berrer (first round)
7. (Russia) Konstantin Kravchuk (semifinals)
8. (France) Pierre-Hugues Herbert (first round)

== Draw ==
=== Key ===
- Q = Qualifier
- WC = Wild card
- LL = Lucky loser
- Alt = Alternate
- SE = Special exempt
- PR = Protected ranking
- ITF = ITF entry
- JE = Junior exempt
- w/o = Walkover
- r = Retired
- d = Defaulted
- SR = Special ranking

=== Finals ===
Semifinals
7	(Russia) Konstantin Kravchuk	6^{8}	6^{4}
Alt	(Switzerland) Marco Chiudinelli	7^{10}	7^{7}
Q	(Czech Republic) Jan Hernych	7^{7}	6
2	(Germany) Dustin Brown	6^{5}	4

Final
Alt	(Switzerland) Marco Chiudinelli	6	7^{11}
Q	(Czech Republic) Jan Hernych	3	6^{9}

=== Top half ===
First round
1	(Russia) E Donskoy	6	6
WC	(Poland) K Majchrzak	4	4
WC	(Poland) Paweł Ciaś	1	3
(Kazakhstan) A Nedovyesov	6	6
WC	(Poland) Ł Kubot	7^{7}	6
(Japan) H Moriya	6^{5}	4
(Romania) A Ungur	2	3
7	(Russia) K Kravchuk	6	6
4	(Slovakia) L Lacko	6^{4}	6	6
WC	(Poland) H Hurkacz	7^{7}	4	4
(Russia) A Kudryavtsev	7^{16}	7^{7}
(Australia) J Thompson	6^{14}	6^{2}
(United Kingdom) D Evans	3	6	3
Alt	(Switzerland) M Chiudinelli	6	3	6
(Romania) M Copil	4	6^{5}
5	(Bosnia and Herzegovina) M Bašić	6	7^{7}

Second round
1	(Russia) E Donskoy	6	6
(Kazakhstan) A Nedovyesov	4	4
WC	(Poland) Ł Kubot	7^{7}	4	3
7	(Russia) K Kravchuk	6^{5}	6	6
4	(Slovakia) L Lacko	6	4	6^{4}
(Russia) A Kudryavtsev	2	6	7^{7}
Alt	(Switzerland) M Chiudinelli	7^{10}	7^{8}
5	(Bosnia and Herzegovina) M Bašić	6^{8}	6^{6}

Quarterfinals
1	(Russia) E Donskoy	6^{4}	7^{11}	4
7	(Russia) K Kravchuk	7^{7}	6^{9}	6
(Russia) A Kudryavtsev	3	2
Alt	(Switzerland) M Chiudinelli	6	6

Semifinals
7	(Russia) K Kravchuk	6^{8}	6^{4}
Alt	(Switzerland) M Chiudinelli	7^{10}	7^{7}

=== Bottom half ===
First round
8	(France) P-H Herbert	6^{4}	7^{7}	6^{3}
(Uzbekistan) F Dustov	7^{7}	6^{5}	7^{7}
(Estonia) J Zopp	7^{7}	4	6
(Belarus) E Gerasimov	6^{3}	6	3
SE	(France) G Barrère	4	6	7^{7}
Q	(Serbia) M Tepavac	6	4	6^{5}
Q	(Czech Republic) J Hernych	4	6	7^{7}
3	(Germany) J-L Struff	6	2	6^{5}
6	(Germany) M Berrer	4	7	4
Q	(Czech Republic) Z Kolář	6	5	6
PR	(France) A Olivetti	6	7^{14}
Q	(Ukraine) D Molchanov	2	6^{12}
(Kazakhstan) A Golubev	7^{7}	6^{4}	6
(Italy) A Arnaboldi	6^{3}	7^{7}	4
(Czech Republic) A Pavlásek	4	5
2	(Germany) D Brown	6	7

Second round
(Uzbekistan) F Dustov	6^{3}	4
(Estonia) J Zopp	7^{7}	6
SE	(France) G Barrère	7^{7}	3	2
Q	(Czech Republic) J Hernych	6^{5}	6	6
Q	(Czech Republic) Z Kolář	6^{5}	6	3
PR	(France) A Olivetti	7^{7}	3	6
(Kazakhstan) A Golubev	1	4
2	(Germany) D Brown	6	6

Quarterfinals
(Estonia) J Zopp	6^{4}	4
Q	(Czech Republic) J Hernych	7^{7}	6
PR	(France) A Olivetti	4	2
2	(Germany) D Brown	6	6

Semifinals
Q	(Czech Republic) J Hernych	7^{7}	6
2	(Germany) D Brown	6^{5}	4
