= 2015 Wrocław Open – Doubles =

Doubles
- 2015 Wrocław Open

Final
- Champions: (Germany) Philipp Petzschner (Germany) Tim Pütz
- Runners-up: (Canada) Frank Dancevic (Poland) Andriej Kapaś
- Score: 7–6^{(7–4)}, 6–3

Events
Singles	Doubles
Wrocław Open	· 2016 →

This is the first edition of the tournament.

== Seeds ==
1. (Belarus) Sergey Betov / (Belarus) Alexander Bury (quarterfinals)
2. (Netherlands) Jesse Huta Galung / (Russia) Konstantin Kravchuk (first round)
3. (Germany) Dominik Meffert / (Germany) Frank Moser (semifinals)
4. (Russia) Mikhail Elgin / (Kazakhstan) Aleksandr Nedovyesov (first round)

== Draw ==
=== Key ===
- Q = Qualifier
- WC = Wild card
- LL = Lucky loser
- Alt = Alternate
- SE = Special exempt
- PR = Protected ranking
- ITF = ITF entry
- JE = Junior exempt
- w/o = Walkover
- r = Retired
- d = Defaulted
- SR = Special ranking

First round
1	(Belarus) S Betov (Belarus) A Bury	6	6
(Uzbekistan) F Dustov (Czech Republic) J Mertl	3	4
WC	(Poland) M Terczynski (Poland) S Walków	2	4
(Canada) F Dancevic (Poland) A Kapaś	6	6
3	(Germany) D Meffert (Germany) F Moser	4	7^{7}	[10]
WC	(Poland) K Majchrzak (Poland) J Zieliński	6	6^{1}	[8]
(Netherlands) W Koolhof (Netherlands) M Middelkoop	6	7^{7}
(Belgium) N Desein (Italy) A Motti	3	6^{5}
(Czech Republic) R Jebavý (Slovakia) I Zelenay	4	7^{7}	[6]
(Germany) P Petzschner (Germany) T Pütz	6	6^{3}	[10]
(Italy) A Arnaboldi (Hungary) M Fucsovics	5	6	[10]
4	(Russia) M Elgin (Kazakhstan) A Nedovyesov	7	4	[5]
(Poland) B Koniusz (Poland) M Kowalczyk	3	6	[7]
(Slovakia) A Martin (Chinese Taipei) H-y Peng	6	1	[10]
WC	(Poland) H Hurkacz (Poland) M Przysiężny	6	6
2	(Netherlands) J Huta Galung (Russia) K Kravchuk	4	3

Quarterfinals
1	(Belarus) S Betov (Belarus) A Bury	6	2	[9]
(Canada) F Dancevic (Poland) A Kapaś	3	6	[11]
3	(Germany) D Meffert (Germany) F Moser	4	6	[11]
(Netherlands) W Koolhof (Netherlands) M Middelkoop	6	3	[9]
(Germany) P Petzschner (Germany) T Pütz	6	7^{7}
(Italy) A Arnaboldi (Hungary) M Fucsovics	2	6^{3}
(Slovakia) A Martin (Chinese Taipei) H-y Peng	7^{11}	6
WC	(Poland) H Hurkacz (Poland) M Przysiężny	6^{9}	3

Semifinals
(Canada) F Dancevic (Poland) A Kapaś	7^{10}	6
3	(Germany) D Meffert (Germany) F Moser	6^{8}	3
(Germany) P Petzschner (Germany) T Pütz	6	6
(Slovakia) A Martin (Chinese Taipei) H-y Peng	3	2

Final
(Canada) F Dancevic (Poland) A Kapaś	6^{4}	6
(Germany) P Petzschner (Germany) T Pütz	7^{7}	6
