= 2017 Wrocław Open – Doubles =

Doubles
- 2017 Wrocław Open

Final
- Champions: (Canada) Adil Shamasdin (Belarus) Andrei Vasilevski
- Runners-up: (Russia) Mikhail Elgin (Ukraine) Denys Molchanov
- Score: 6–3, 3–6, [21–19]

Events
Singles	Doubles
← 2016 ·	Wrocław Open	· 2018 →

Pierre-Hugues Herbert and Albano Olivetti were the defending champions but only Olivetti chose to defend his title, partnering Kevin Krawietz. Olivetti lost in the first round to Roman Jebavý and Igor Zelenay.

Adil Shamasdin and Andrei Vasilevski won the title after defeating Mikhail Elgin and Denys Molchanov 6–3, 3–6, [21–19] in the final.

== Seeds ==
1. (France) Jonathan Eysseric / (Croatia) Antonio Šančić (semifinals)
2. (United Kingdom) Ken Skupski / (United Kingdom) Neal Skupski (first round)
3. (Russia) Mikhail Elgin / (Ukraine) Denys Molchanov (final)
4. (Canada) Adil Shamasdin / (Belarus) Andrei Vasilevski (champions)

== Draw ==
=== Key ===
- Q = Qualifier
- WC = Wild card
- LL = Lucky loser
- Alt = Alternate
- SE = Special exempt
- PR = Protected ranking
- ITF = ITF entry
- JE = Junior exempt
- w/o = Walkover
- r = Retired
- d = Defaulted
- SR = Special ranking

First round
1	(France) J Eysseric (Croatia) A Šančić	7^{7}	6
WC	(Poland) A Kapaś (Poland) M Przysiężny	6^{4}	4
(Croatia) D Marcan (Austria) T-S Weissborn	7^{7}	7
(Germany) A Begemann (Belarus) A Bury	6^{3}	5
3	(Russia) M Elgin (Ukraine) D Molchanov	6	7
(France) K de Schepper (Italy) A Motti	2	5
(Germany) K Krawietz (France) A Olivetti	3	7^{7}	[6]
(Czech Republic) R Jebavý (Slovakia) I Zelenay	6	6^{5}	[10]
WC	(Poland) T Bednarek (Poland) H Hurkacz	1	6^{5}
(Austria) J Knowle (Austria) J Melzer	6	7^{7}
(Italy) R Ghedin (Germany) A Mies	6^{3}	4
4	(Canada) A Shamasdin (Belarus) A Vasilevski	7^{7}	6
(Uruguay) A Behar (Kazakhstan) A Golubev	5	3
WC	(Poland) M Kowalczyk (Poland) G Panfil	7	6
(Australia) R Junaid (Switzerland) L Margaroli	7^{7}	4	[10]
2	(United Kingdom) K Skupski (United Kingdom) N Skupski	6^{2}	6	[8]

Quarterfinals
1	(France) J Eysseric (Croatia) A Šančić	6	6^{6}	[10]
(Croatia) D Marcan (Austria) T-S Weissborn	3	7^{8}	[7]
3	(Russia) M Elgin (Ukraine) D Molchanov	7^{7}	7^{7}
(Czech Republic) R Jebavý (Slovakia) I Zelenay	6^{3}	6^{5}
(Austria) J Knowle (Austria) J Melzer	3	7	[8]
4	(Canada) A Shamasdin (Belarus) A Vasilevski	6	5	[10]
WC	(Poland) M Kowalczyk (Poland) G Panfil	5	3
(Australia) R Junaid (Switzerland) L Margaroli	7	6

Semifinals
1	(France) J Eysseric (Croatia) A Šančić	6^{5}	6^{5}
3	(Russia) M Elgin (Ukraine) D Molchanov	7^{7}	7^{7}
4	(Canada) A Shamasdin (Belarus) A Vasilevski	6	7^{7}
(Australia) R Junaid (Switzerland) L Margaroli	2	6^{4}

Final
3	(Russia) M Elgin (Ukraine) D Molchanov	3	6	[19]
4	(Canada) A Shamasdin (Belarus) A Vasilevski	6	3	[21]
