= 2009 Tail Savannah Challenger =

- Date: May 4–10, 2010
- Edition: 1st
- Location: Savannah, Georgia, United States

Champions

Singles
- (United States) Michael Russell

Doubles
- (Australia) Carsten Ball / (United States) Travis Rettenmaier
- Tail Savannah Challenger

The 2009 Tail Savannah Challenger was a professional tennis tournament played on outdoor green clay courts. It was part of the 2009 ATP Challenger Tour. It took place in Savannah, United States between May 4 and May 10, 2009.

== Singles entrants ==
=== Seeds ===
Nationality	Player	Ranking*	Seeding
USA	Kevin Kim	104	1
USA	Vince Spadea	110	2
USA	John Isner	113	3
USA	Jesse Levine	130	4
USA	Donald Young	165	5
AUS	Carsten Ball	182	6
FRA	Éric Prodon	189	7
ARG	~~Mariano Puerta~~	~~192~~	~~8~~
USA	Scoville Jenkins	202	9

- Rankings are as of April 27, 2009.

=== Other entrants ===
The following players received wildcards into the singles main draw:

- (United States) Stephen Bass
- (United States) Nicholas Monroe
- (United States) Jesse Witten
- (South Africa) Fritz Wolmarans

The following players received entry from the qualifying draw:

- (Lithuania) Ričardas Berankis
- (United States) Chris Klingemann
- (United States) Tim Smyczek
- (Czech Republic) Adam Vejmělka (as a Lucky loser)

== Champions ==
=== Singles ===
(United States) Michael Russell def. (United States) Alex Kuznetsov, 6–4, 7–6(6)

=== Doubles ===
(Australia) Carsten Ball / (United States) Travis Rettenmaier def. (India) Harsh Mankad / (United States) Kaes Van't Hof, 7–6(4), 6–4
