= 2016 Wrocław Open =

- Date: 15–21 February
- Edition: 2nd
- Draw: 32S / 16D
- Prize money: €85,000+H
- Surface: Hard (indoor)
- Location: Wrocław, Poland

Champions

Singles
- (Switzerland) Marco Chiudinelli

Doubles
- (France) Pierre-Hugues Herbert / (France) Albano Olivetti
← 2015 ·	Wrocław Open	· 2017 →

The 2016 Wrocław Open was a professional tennis tournament played on indoor hard courts. It was the second edition of the tournament which was part of the 2016 ATP Challenger Tour. It took place in Wrocław, Poland between 15 and 21 February 2016.

== Singles main-draw entrants ==
=== Seeds ===
Country	Player	Rank^{1}	Seed
RUS	Evgeny Donskoy	83	1
GER	Dustin Brown	104	2
GER	Jan-Lennard Struff	106	3
SVK	Lukáš Lacko	108	4
BIH	Mirza Bašić	109	5
GER	Michael Berrer	110	6
RUS	Konstantin Kravchuk	135	7
FRA	Pierre-Hugues Herbert	141	8

- ^{1} Rankings as of February 8, 2016.

=== Other entrants ===
The following players received wildcards into the singles main draw:

- (Poland) Paweł Ciaś
- (Poland) Hubert Hurkacz
- (Poland) Łukasz Kubot
- (Poland) Kamil Majchrzak

The following player received entry to the singles main draw as an alternate:

- (Switzerland) Marco Chiudinelli

The following player received entry to the singles main draw as a special exemption:

- (France) Grégoire Barrère

The following player received entry to the singles main draw as a protected ranking:

- (France) Albano Olivetti

The following players received entry from the qualifying draw:

- (Czech Republic) Jan Hernych
- (Czech Republic) Zdeněk Kolář
- (Ukraine) Denys Molchanov
- (Serbia) Marko Tepavac

== Champions ==
=== Singles ===
- (Switzerland) Marco Chiudinelli def. (Czech Republic) Jan Hernych 6–3, 7–6^{(11–9)}

=== Doubles ===
- (France) Pierre-Hugues Herbert / (France) Albano Olivetti def. (Croatia) Nikola Mektić / (Croatia) Antonio Šančić 6–3, 7–6^{(7–4)}
