= 2008 US Open – Men's singles =

Men's singles
- 2008 US Open

Final
- Champion: (Switzerland) Roger Federer
- Runner-up: (United Kingdom) Andy Murray
- Score: 6–2, 7–5, 6–2

Details
- Draw: 128
- Seeds: 32

Events
Singles	men	women		boys	girls
Doubles	men	women	mixed	boys	girls
WC Singles	men	women	quad
WC Doubles	men	women	quad
Legends	men	women	mixed
- US Open

Four-time defending champion Roger Federer defeated Andy Murray in the final, 6–2, 7–5, 6–2 to win the men's singles tennis title at the 2008 US Open. It was his fifth US Open title and 13th major title overall. Federer moved to second place on the all-time men's singles major titles list, passing Roy Emerson. This remains the most recent US Open title defense in men's singles.

Murray was the first British man to reach a major final since Greg Rusedski at the 1997 US Open, and was attempting to become the first British man to win a singles major since Fred Perry in 1936 (he would eventually achieve the feat four years later).

Rafael Nadal was attempting to become the first man to achieve the Surface Slam (winning majors on clay, grass and hard courts in the same year), having won the French Open and Wimbledon titles. He lost to Murray in the semifinals. Nadal would eventually achieve the feat two years later.

This was the first of four majors to feature all of the Big Four (Federer, Nadal, Novak Djokovic, and Murray) in the semifinals (followed by the 2011 French Open, 2011 US Open, and 2012 Australian Open).

Gilles Muller became the first Luxembourgish player to reach a major quarterfinal.

This was Juan Martín del Potro's first major appearance as a seeded player. He lost in the quarterfinals against Murray to end a 23-match winning streak. He would win the title the following year. Another future champion, Marin Čilić, appeared in the main draw of the US Open for the first time.

This marked the last major appearance of 2002 Australian Open champion Thomas Johansson; he lost in the first round to Ernests Gulbis.

== Seeds ==
1. (Spain) Rafael Nadal (semifinals)
2. (Switzerland) Roger Federer (champion)
3. (Serbia) Novak Djokovic (semifinals)
4. (Spain) David Ferrer (third round)
5. (Russia) Nikolay Davydenko (fourth round)
6. (United Kingdom) Andy Murray (final)
7. (Argentina) David Nalbandian (third round)
8. (United States) Andy Roddick (quarterfinals)
9. (United States) James Blake (third round)
10. (Switzerland) Stanislas Wawrinka (fourth round)
11. (Chile) Fernando González (fourth round)
12. (France) Richard Gasquet (first round)
13. (Spain) Fernando Verdasco (third round)
14. (Croatia) Ivo Karlović (third round)
15. (Spain) Tommy Robredo (fourth round)
16. (France) Gilles Simon (third round)

17. (Argentina) Juan Martín del Potro (quarterfinals)
18. (Spain) Nicolás Almagro (third round)
19. (France) Jo-Wilfried Tsonga (third round)
20. (Germany) Nicolas Kiefer (first round, retired)
21. (Russia) Mikhail Youzhny (withdrew due to illness, replaced by Flavio Cipolla)
22. (Czech Republic) Tomáš Berdych (first round)
23. (Russia) Igor Andreev (fourth round)
24. (France) Paul-Henri Mathieu (second round)
25. (Germany) Philipp Kohlschreiber (second round, retired)
26. (Russia) Dmitry Tursunov (third round)
27. (Spain) Feliciano López (first round)
28. (Czech Republic) Radek Štěpánek (third round)
29. (Argentina) Juan Mónaco (first round)
30. (Croatia) Marin Čilić (third round)
31. (Italy) Andreas Seppi (third round)
32. (France) Gaël Monfils (fourth round)

Click on the seed number of a player to go to their draw section.

== Draw ==
Key

- Q = Qualifier
- WC = Wild card
- LL = Lucky loser
- Alt = Alternate
- ITF = ITF entry
- PR = Protected ranking
- SR = Special ranking
- SE = Special exempt
- JE = Junior exempt
- JR = Junior Accelerator Programme entrant
- CO = College Accelerator Programme entrant
- NG = Next Gen Accelerator Program entrant
- w/o = Walkover
- r = Retired
- d = Defaulted

=== Finals ===
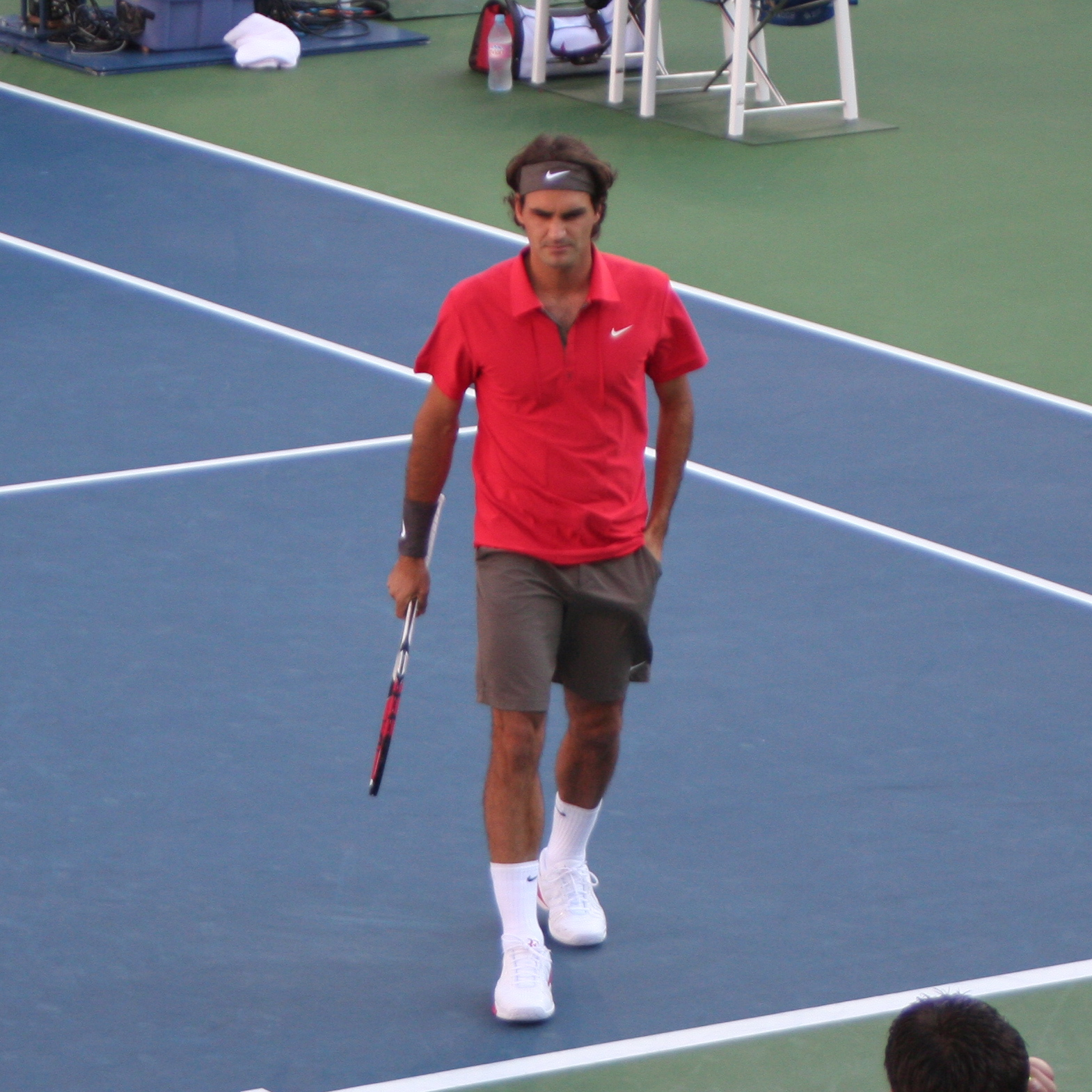
Second seeded Roger Federer won the tournament for the fifth year in a row.

Quarterfinals
1	(Spain) Rafael Nadal	3	6	6	6
(United States) Mardy Fish	6	1	4	2
17	(Argentina) Juan Martín del Potro	6^{2}	6^{1}	6	5
6	(United Kingdom) Andy Murray	7^{7}	7^{7}	4	7
8	(United States) Andy Roddick	2	3	6	6^{5}
3	(Serbia) Novak Djokovic	6	6	3	7^{7}
Q	(Luxembourg) Gilles Müller	6^{5}	4	6^{5}
2	(Switzerland) Roger Federer	7^{7}	6	7^{7}

Semifinals
1	(Spain) Rafael Nadal	2	6^{5}	6	4
6	(United Kingdom) Andy Murray	6	7^{7}	4	6
3	(Serbia) Novak Djokovic	3	7	5	2
2	(Switzerland) Roger Federer	6	5	7	6

Final
6	(United Kingdom) Andy Murray	2	5	2
2	(Switzerland) Roger Federer	6	7	6

=== Top half ===
==== Section 1 ====
First round
1	(Spain) R Nadal	7^{8}	6	7^{8}
Q	(Germany) B Phau	6^{6}	3	6^{6}
Q	(United States) R DeHeart	7^{7}	5	6	3	6
(Belgium) O Rochus	6^{4}	7	4	6	4
(Serbia) V Troicki	7^{7}	6	6
WC	(Australia) C Ball	6^{3}	0	1
(Peru) L Horna	2	3	2
25	(Germany) P Kohlschreiber	6	6	6
22	(Czech Republic) T Berdych	3	1	2
(United States) S Querrey	6	6	6
(Spain) P Andújar	4	2	2
(France) N Devilder	6	6	6
(Germany) R Schüttler	6^{8}	0	0	r
(France) F Serra	7^{10}	6	2
Q	(Czech Republic) J Minář	5	1	4
14	(Croatia) I Karlović	7	6	6

Second round
1	(Spain) R Nadal	6	6	6
Q	(United States) R DeHeart	1	2	4
(Serbia) V Troicki	2	6	6	3
25	(Germany) P Kohlschreiber	6	3	4	0	r
(United States) S Querrey	7^{8}	6	4	6
(France) N Devilder	6^{6}	4	6	3
(France) F Serra	6^{5}	4	2
14	(Croatia) I Karlović	7^{7}	6	6

Third round
1	(Spain) R Nadal	6	6	6
(Serbia) V Troicki	4	3	0
(United States) S Querrey	7^{7}	7^{7}	6
14	(Croatia) I Karlović	6^{5}	6^{5}	2

Fourth round
1	(Spain) R Nadal	6	5	7^{7}	6
(United States) S Querrey	2	7	6^{2}	3

==== Section 2 ====
First round
9	(United States) J Blake	6	3	6	4	6
(United States) D Young	1	6	1	6	4
(Germany) D Gremelmayr	1	7^{8}	6^{4}	4
(Belgium) S Darcis	6	6^{6}	7^{7}	6
(United States) M Fish	7^{7}	6^{3}	6	6
Q	(Australia) R Smeets	6^{4}	7^{7}	3	4
(France) S Grosjean	7^{7}	6^{5}	3	2
24	(France) P-H Mathieu	6^{4}	7	6	6
32	(France) G Monfils	6	6	6
Q	(Uruguay) P Cuevas	4	4	1
(Russia) E Korolev	7^{7}	6	7^{11}
(Sweden) R Söderling	6^{4}	3	6^{9}
LL	(Kazakhstan) A Golubev	6	6	6
WC	(United States) B Evans	4	3	2
(Brazil) M Daniel	1	2	4
7	(Argentina) D Nalbandian	6	6	6

Second round
9	(United States) J Blake	4	6	1
(Belgium) S Darcis	6	3	0	r
(United States) M Fish	6	3	6	6
24	(France) P-H Mathieu	2	6	3	4
32	(France) G Monfils	6	6	3	6
(Russia) E Korolev	2	3	6	4
LL	(Kazakhstan) A Golubev	2	4	2
7	(Argentina) D Nalbandian	6	6	6

Third round
9	(United States) J Blake	3	3	6^{4}
(United States) M Fish	6	6	7^{7}
32	(France) G Monfils	6	6	6
7	(Argentina) D Nalbandian	3	4	2

Fourth round
(United States) M Fish	7	6	6
32	(France) G Monfils	5	2	2

==== Section 3 ====
First round
4	(Spain) D Ferrer	7^{7}	6	6
(Argentina) M Vassallo Argüello	6^{1}	2	2
Q	(Germany) A Beck	7^{7}	6	7^{7}
(United States) J Isner	6^{5}	4	6^{3}
Q	(United States) R Sweeting	5	5	6	2
(Croatia) R Karanušić	7	7	3	6
(Japan) K Nishikori	6	6	5	6
29	(Argentina) J Mónaco	2	2	7	2
17	(Argentina) JM del Potro	4	7^{7}	6	6
(Argentina) G Cañas	6	6^{0}	4	1
(Spain) Ó Hernández	3	7^{7}	4	5
(Brazil) T Bellucci	6	6^{5}	6	7
(Germany) M Berrer	4	2	2
(Argentina) J Acasuso	6	6	6
(Spain) M Granollers	4	3	7	2
16	(France) G Simon	6	6	5	6

Second round
4	(Spain) D Ferrer	4	7	6	7^{7}
Q	(Germany) A Beck	6	5	3	6^{5}
(Croatia) R Karanušić	1	5	r
(Japan) K Nishikori	6	7
17	(Argentina) JM del Potro	4	6	7	6
(Brazil) T Bellucci	6	1	5	3
(Argentina) J Acasuso	4	1	4
16	(France) G Simon	6	6	6

Third round
4	(Spain) D Ferrer	4	4	6	6	5
(Japan) K Nishikori	6	6	3	2	7
17	(Argentina) JM del Potro	6	6^{4}	6	3	6
16	(France) G Simon	4	7^{7}	1	6	3

Fourth round
(Japan) K Nishikori	3	4	3
17	(Argentina) JM del Potro	6	6	6

==== Section 4 ====
First round
10	(Switzerland) S Wawrinka	7^{7}	6	6
(Italy) S Bolelli	6^{5}	3	3
(United States) W Odesnik	2	6	4	6	6
(Italy) F Fognini	6	0	6	3	4
(Ecuador) N Lapentti	4	6	6	4	3
(Chinese Taipei) Y-h Lu	6	1	4	6	6
Q	(Czech Republic) J Hernych	7^{7}	4	6	6^{0}	6^{4}
LL	(Italy) F Cipolla	6^{2}	6	2	7^{7}	7^{7}
27	(Spain) F López	6	6^{5}	2	6	4
(Austria) J Melzer	4	7^{7}	6	2	6
(Czech Republic) J Vaněk	3	6	6	7
Q	(Switzerland) S Bohli	6	3	2	5
(Russia) T Gabashvili	3	7	6^{5}	6^{4}
(France) M Llodra	6	5	7^{7}	7^{7}
(Argentina) S Roitman	3	4	0
6	(United Kingdom) A Murray	6	6	6

Second round
10	(Switzerland) S Wawrinka	6	7^{8}	6
(United States) W Odesnik	4	6^{6}	2
(Chinese Taipei) Y-h Lu	1	6	6^{2}	4
LL	(Italy) F Cipolla	6	4	7^{7}	6
(Austria) J Melzer	6	6	6
(Czech Republic) J Vaněk	0	2	2
(France) M Llodra	4	6	5	6^{7}
6	(United Kingdom) A Murray	6	1	7	7^{9}

Third round
10	(Switzerland) S Wawrinka	5	6^{4}	6	6	6
LL	(Italy) F Cipolla	7	7^{7}	4	0	4
(Austria) J Melzer	7^{7}	6	6^{5}	1	3
6	(United Kingdom) A Murray	6^{5}	4	7^{7}	6	6

Fourth round
10	(Switzerland) S Wawrinka	1	3	3
6	(United Kingdom) A Murray	6	6	6

=== Bottom half ===
==== Section 5 ====
First round
8	(United States) A Roddick	6	6	6
(France) F Santoro	2	2	2
(Latvia) E Gulbis	7	6	7^{7}
(Sweden) T Johansson	5	1	6^{3}
(Spain) G García López	4	6	6	6
PR	(Slovakia) D Hrbatý	6	3	4	4
(South Korea) H-t Lee	3	5	6	6	3
31	(Italy) A Seppi	6	7	3	3	6
20	(Germany) N Kiefer	6	1	4	1	r
(Czech Republic) I Minář	4	6	6	4
WC	(United States) S Jenkins	3	3	5
(Finland) J Nieminen	6	6	7
(United States) B Reynolds	6	6^{3}	2	6	7^{7}
Q	(Czech Republic) T Zíb	4	7^{7}	6	4	6^{4}
(Spain) I Navarro	6^{3}	3	6	6^{5}
11	(Chile) F González	7^{7}	6	4	7^{7}

Second round
8	(United States) A Roddick	3	7	6	7
(Latvia) E Gulbis	6	5	2	5
(Spain) G García López	2	6	2	2
31	(Italy) A Seppi	6	4	6	6
(Czech Republic) I Minář	7^{7}	6	4	3	2
(Finland) J Nieminen	6^{2}	3	6	6	6
(United States) B Reynolds	6^{6}	4	4
11	(Chile) F González	7^{8}	6	6

Third round
8	(United States) A Roddick	6	7	7^{7}
31	(Italy) A Seppi	2	5	6^{4}
(Finland) J Nieminen	5	4	7^{7}	1
11	(Chile) F González	7	6	6^{3}	6

Fourth round
8	(United States) A Roddick	6	6	6
11	(Chile) F González	2	4	1

==== Section 6 ====
First round
15	(Spain) T Robredo	7^{7}	6	6
(Germany) M Zverev	6^{4}	2	1
(United States) V Spadea	6	2	3	6	4
(Russia) M Safin	3	6	6	4	6
LL	(Pakistan) A-u-H Qureshi	4	7^{7}	6^{2}	2
(Spain) C Moyá	6	6^{5}	7^{7}	6
(Spain) S Ventura	7^{7}	4	2	3
19	(France) J-W Tsonga	6^{3}	6	6	6
30	(Croatia) M Čilić	4	7	6	6^{7}	6
(France) J Benneteau	6	5	3	7^{9}	2
(United States) R Ginepri	6	6	7^{7}
WC	(United States) A Delic	1	2	6^{5}
Q	(United States) R Kendrick	7^{7}	6	5	7
(France) N Mahut	6^{3}	4	7	5
(France) A Clément	3	3	4
3	(Serbia) N Djokovic	6	6	6

Second round
15	(Spain) T Robredo	4	7^{7}	6	6
(Russia) M Safin	6	6^{4}	4	0
(Spain) C Moyá	6	3	4	4
19	(France) J-W Tsonga	4	6	6	6
30	(Croatia) M Čilić	6	2	6	7
(United States) R Ginepri	4	6	2	5
Q	(United States) R Kendrick	6^{8}	4	4
3	(Serbia) N Djokovic	7^{10}	6	6

Third round
15	(Spain) T Robredo	7^{7}	6	6
19	(France) J-W Tsonga	6^{2}	2	3
30	(Croatia) M Čilić	7^{9}	5	4	6^{0}
3	(Serbia) N Djokovic	6^{7}	7	6	7^{7}

Fourth round
15	(Spain) T Robredo	6	2	3	7	3
3	(Serbia) N Djokovic	4	6	6	5	6

==== Section 7 ====
First round
5	(Russia) N Davydenko	6	6	6
(Israel) D Sela	3	3	3
WC	(United States) A Krajicek	2	2	1
(Argentina) A Calleri	6	6	6
(Spain) A Montañés	6^{5}	3	6	3
(Romania) V Hănescu	7^{7}	6	2	6
(Argentina) E Schwank	5	6	5	6^{5}
26	(Russia) D Tursunov	7	4	7	7^{7}
18	(Spain) N Almagro	6	6	7
(Canada) F Dancevic	3	4	5
WC	(United States) S Warburg	6	1
(Serbia) J Tipsarević	2	0	r
WC	(France) L Recouderc	4	0	6	4
Q	(Luxembourg) G Müller	6	6	4	6
(Germany) T Haas	6^{3}	6	5	7	6
12	(France) R Gasquet	7^{7}	4	7	5	2

Second round
5	(Russia) N Davydenko	6	6	7^{7}
(Argentina) A Calleri	4	4	6^{2}
(Romania) V Hănescu	7^{7}	3	4	2
26	(Russia) D Tursunov	6^{2}	6	6	6
18	(Spain) N Almagro	6	6	6
WC	(United States) S Warburg	3	4	4
Q	(Luxembourg) G Müller	2	2	7^{7}	6	6
(Germany) T Haas	6	6	6^{5}	3	3

Third round
5	(Russia) N Davydenko	6	7^{7}	6
26	(Russia) D Tursunov	2	6^{4}	3
18	(Spain) N Almagro	7^{7}	6	6^{5}	6^{6}	5
Q	(Luxembourg) G Müller	6^{3}	3	7^{7}	7^{8}	7

Fourth round
5	(Russia) N Davydenko	4	6	3	6^{10}
Q	(Luxembourg) G Müller	6	4	6	7^{12}

==== Section 8 ====
First round
13	(Spain) F Verdasco	6	6	6
(Russia) I Kunitsyn	3	4	1
Q	(Portugal) R Machado	6	7^{9}	6
Q	(South Africa) R de Voest	4	6^{7}	1
(Portugal) F Gil	6	3	2	3
(France) J Chardy	3	6	6	6
(France) M Gicquel	6^{3}	4	4
23	(Russia) I Andreev	7^{7}	6	6
28	(Czech Republic) R Štěpánek	7	6	6
(Italy) P Starace	5	3	1
WC	(United States) J Levine	3	6	6^{6}	6^{6}
(Australia) C Guccione	6	3	7^{8}	7^{8}
Q	(Brazil) T Alves	4	1	6	7^{7}	6
Q	(Chile) P Capdeville	6	6	1	6^{2}	4
(Argentina) M González	3	0	3
2	(Switzerland) R Federer	6	6	6

Second round
13	(Spain) F Verdasco	6^{5}	7^{7}	6	6^{6}	6
Q	(Portugal) R Machado	7^{7}	6^{5}	4	7^{8}	0
(France) J Chardy	6^{3}	4	3
23	(Russia) I Andreev	7^{7}	6	6
28	(Czech Republic) R Štěpánek	6	6	6^{3}	6
(Australia) C Guccione	4	4	7^{7}	2
Q	(Brazil) T Alves	3	5	4
2	(Switzerland) R Federer	6	7	6

Third round
13	(Spain) F Verdasco	2	4	4
23	(Russia) I Andreev	6	6	6
28	(Czech Republic) R Štěpánek	3	3	2
2	(Switzerland) R Federer	6	6	6

Fourth round
23	(Russia) I Andreev	7^{7}	6^{5}	3	6	3
2	(Switzerland) R Federer	6^{5}	7^{7}	6	3	6

Preceded by 2008 Wimbledon Championships – Men's singles	Grand Slam men's singles	Succeeded by 2009 Australian Open – Men's singles
