= 2017 Wrocław Open =

- Date: 27 February – 5 March
- Edition: 3rd
- Draw: 32S / 16D
- Prize money: €85,000+H
- Surface: Hard (indoor)
- Location: Wrocław, Poland

Champions

Singles
- (Austria) Jürgen Melzer

Doubles
- (Canada) Adil Shamasdin / (Belarus) Andrei Vasilevski
← 2016 ·	Wrocław Open	· 2018 →

The 2017 Wrocław Open was a professional tennis tournament played on indoor hard courts. It was the third edition of the tournament which was part of the 2017 ATP Challenger Tour. It took place in Wrocław, Poland between 27 February and 5 March 2017.

== Singles main-draw entrants ==
=== Seeds ===
Country	Player	Rank^{1}	Seed
FRA	Paul-Henri Mathieu	101	1
SVK	Lukáš Lacko	104	2
FRA	Kenny de Schepper	137	3
FRA	Quentin Halys	174	4
BLR	Ilya Ivashka	178	5
KAZ	Aleksandr Nedovyesov	183	6
NED	Igor Sijsling	198	7
AUT	Jürgen Melzer	199	8

- ^{1} Rankings as of February 20, 2017.

=== Other entrants ===
The following players received wildcards into the singles main draw:

- (Poland) Michał Dembek
- (Poland) Hubert Hurkacz
- (Poland) Michał Przysiężny
- (Poland) Kacper Żuk

The following player received entry into the singles main draw as an alternate:

- (Austria) Sebastian Ofner

The following player received entry into the singles main draw using a protected ranking:

- (Austria) Jürgen Melzer

The following player received entry into the singles main draw using a special exemption:

- (France) Quentin Halys

The following players received entry from the qualifying draw:

- (Czech Republic) Marek Jaloviec
- (Poland) Andriej Kapaś
- (Switzerland) Yann Marti
- (Germany) Mats Moraing

== Champions ==
=== Singles ===
- (Austria) Jürgen Melzer def. (Poland) Michał Przysiężny, 6–4, 6–3

=== Doubles ===
- (Canada) Adil Shamasdin / (Belarus) Andrei Vasilevski def. (Russia) Mikhail Elgin / (Ukraine) Denys Molchanov, 6–3, 3–6, [21–19]
