= 2015 Wrocław Open =

- Date: 16–22 February
- Edition: 1st
- Draw: 32S / 16D
- Prize money: €85,000+H
- Surface: Hard
- Location: Wrocław, Poland

Champions

Singles
- (Uzbekistan) Farrukh Dustov

Doubles
- (Germany) Philipp Petzschner / (Germany) Tim Pütz
Wrocław Open	· 2016 →

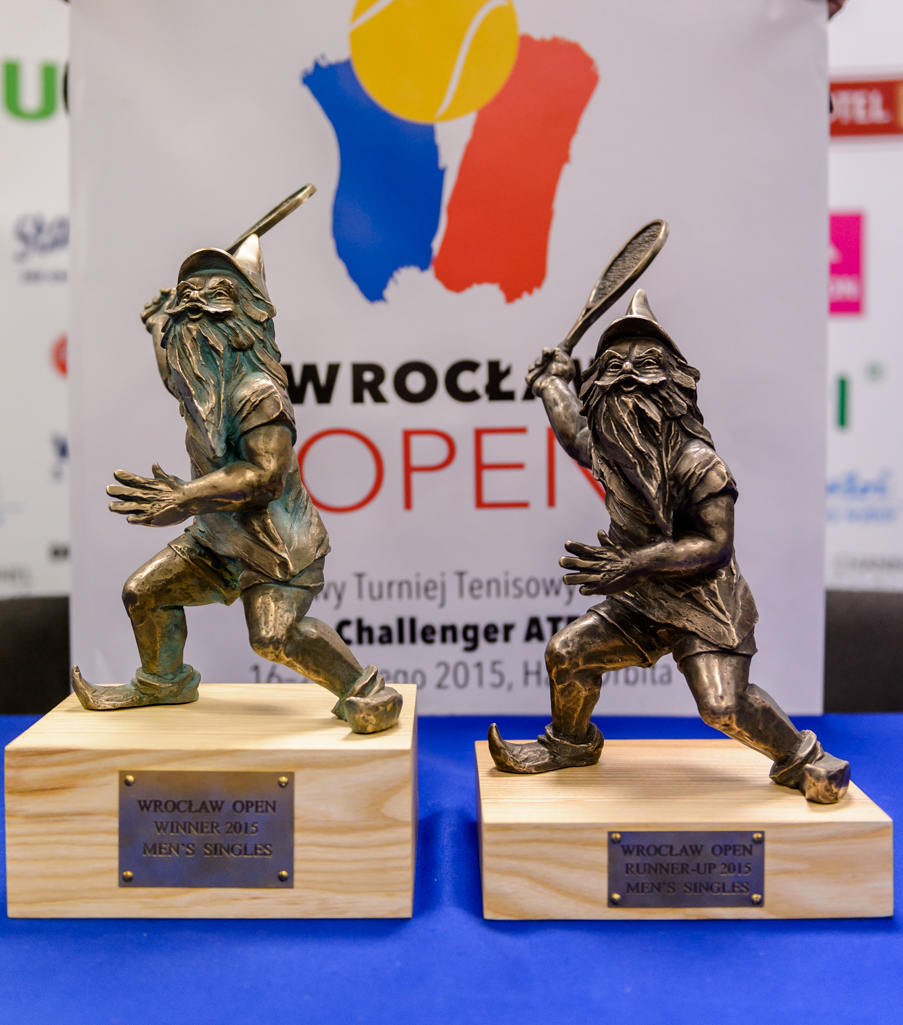
trophy

The 2015 Wrocław Open was a professional tennis tournament played on hard courts. It was the first edition of the tournament which was part of the 2015 ATP Challenger Tour. It took place in Wrocław, Poland between 16 and 22 February 2015.

== Singles main-draw entrants ==
=== Seeds ===
Country	Player	Rank^{1}	Seed
LTU	Ričardas Berankis	79	1
BEL	Steve Darcis	115	2
UZB	Farrukh Dustov	118	3
KAZ	Aleksandr Nedovyesov	119	4
GER	Matthias Bachinger	121	5
UKR	Illya Marchenko	136	6
GER	Michael Berrer	150	7
BEL	Niels Desein	155	8

- ^{1} Rankings are as of February 9, 2015.

=== Other entrants ===
The following players received wildcards into the singles main draw:

- (Poland) Michał Dembek
- (Poland) Hubert Hurkacz
- (Poland) Andriej Kapaś
- (Poland) Kamil Majchrzak

The following players received entry from the qualifying draw:

- (Bosnia and Herzegovina) Mirza Bašić
- (Serbia) Laslo Djere
- (Denmark) Frederik Nielsen
- (Germany) Maximilian Marterer

The following players received entry into the main draw as a lucky loser:

- (Austria) Martin Fischer

== Champions ==
=== Singles ===
- (Uzbekistan) Farrukh Dustov def. (Bosnia and Herzegovina) Mirza Bašić, 6–3, 6–4

=== Doubles ===
- (Germany) Philipp Petzschner / (Germany) Tim Pütz def. (Canada) Frank Dancevic / (Poland) Andriej Kapaś, 7–6^{(7–4)}, 6–3
