= 2009 Calabasas Pro Tennis Championships =

- Date: 19–25 October
- Edition: 9th
- Location: Calabasas, California, United States

Champions

Singles
- (United States) Donald Young

Doubles
- (Mexico) Santiago González / (Germany) Simon Stadler
- Calabasas Pro Tennis Championships

The 2009 Calabasas Pro Tennis Championships was a professional tennis tournament played on outdoor hard courts. It was the ninth edition of the tournament which was part of the 2009 ATP Challenger Tour. It took place in Calabasas, California, United States between 19 and 25 October 2009.

== ATP entrants ==
=== Seeds ===
Country	Player	Rank^{1}	Seed
USA	Kevin Kim	95	1
USA	Michael Russell	96	2
USA	Jesse Levine	104	3
COL	Santiago Giraldo	108	4
USA	Taylor Dent	111	5
CRO	Roko Karanušić	133	6
SLO	Grega Žemlja	155	7
COL	Carlos Salamanca	159	8

- Rankings are as of October 12, 2009.

=== Other entrants ===
The following players received wildcards into the singles main draw:

- (India) Prakash Amritraj
- (United States) Steve Johnson
- (United States) Bradley Klahn
- (South Africa) Gary Sacks

The following players received entry from the qualifying draw:

- (Slovenia) Luka Gregorc
- (Philippines) Cecil Mamiit
- (Republic of Ireland) Louk Sorensen
- (Spain) Fernando Vicente

== Champions ==
=== Singles ===
(United States) Donald Young def. (United States) Michael Russell, 7–6(4), 6–1

=== Doubles ===
(Mexico) Santiago González / (Germany) Simon Stadler def. (Philippines) Treat Conrad Huey / (India) Harsh Mankad, 6–2, 5–7, [10–4]
