= Sunset Moulding YCRC Challenger =

Defunct tennis tournament
- Event name: Yuba City
- Location: Yuba City, California, United States
- Venue: Yuba City; Racquet & Health Club
- Category: ATP Challenger Tour
- Surface: Hard
- Draw: 32S/32Q/16D/4Q
- Prize money: $50,000
- Website: website

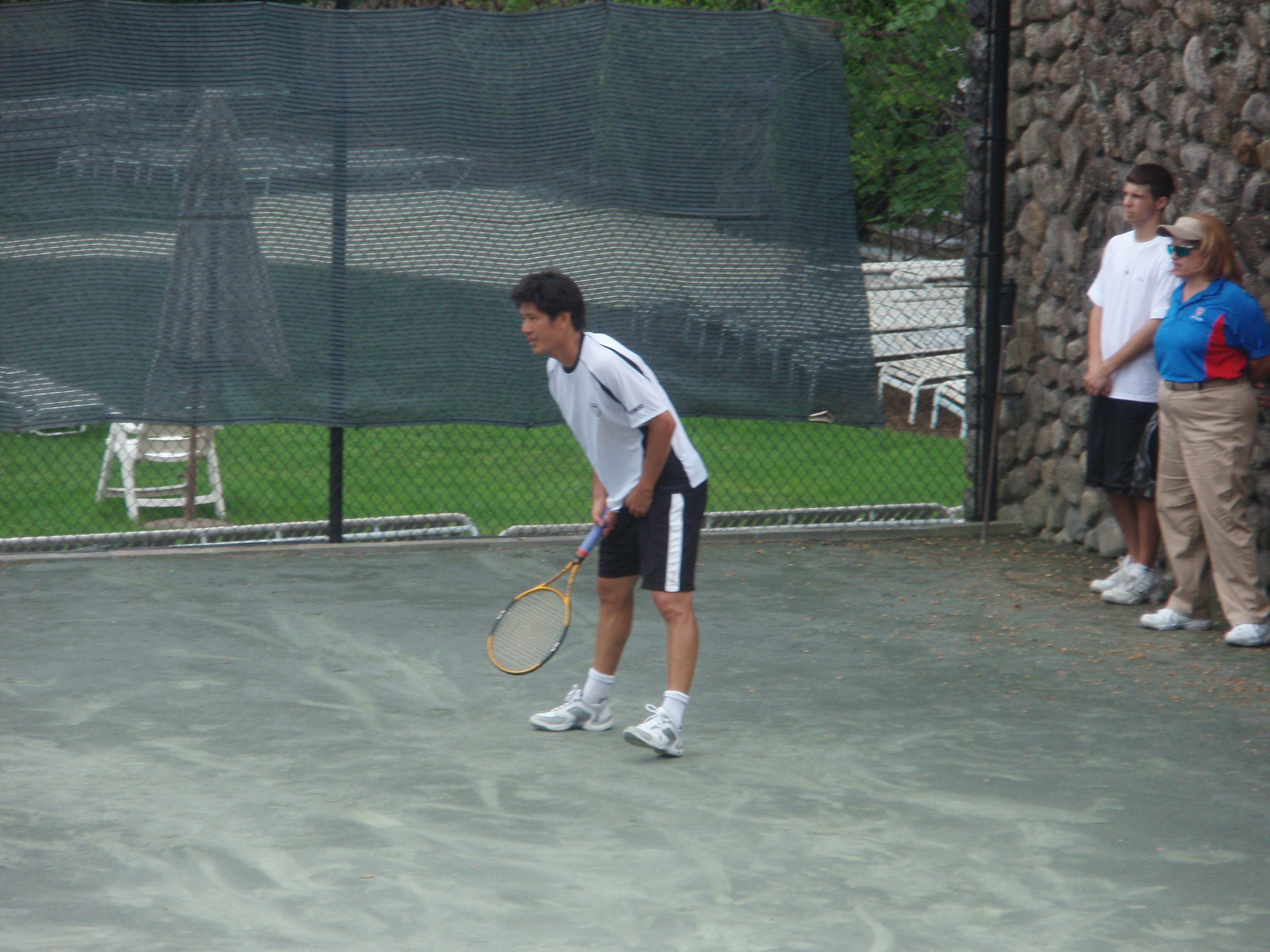
United States' Kevin Kim took the singles in 2007 over Bobby Reynolds

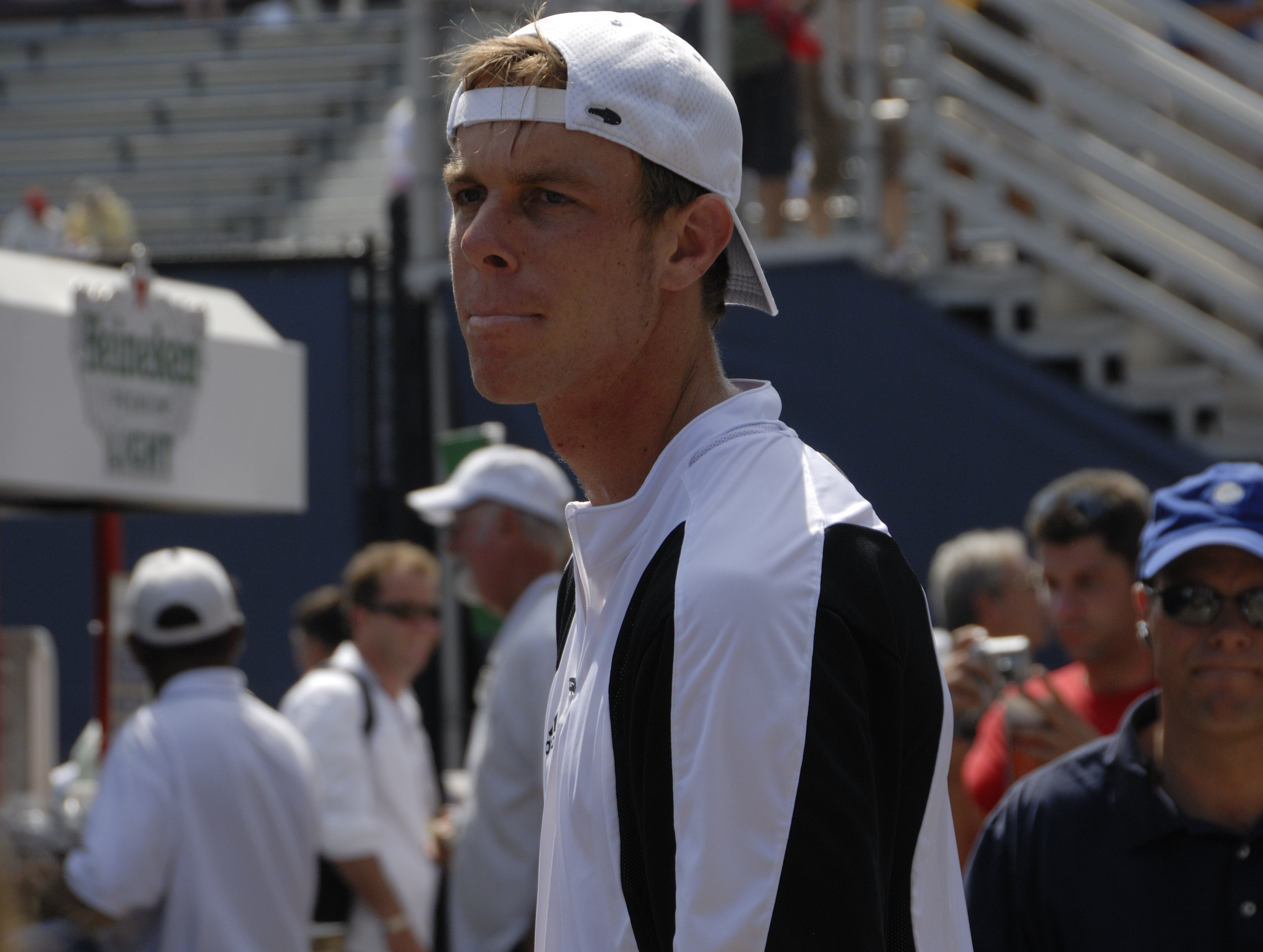
American player Sam Querrey won his first Challenger in Yuba City in 2006

The Sunset Moulding YCRC Challenger was a professional tennis tournament played on outdoor hard courts. It was part of the ATP Challenger Tour. It was held annually at the Yuba City Racquet & Health Club in Yuba City, California, United States, from 2005 to 2009.

== Past finals ==
=== Singles ===
Year	Champion	Runner-up	Score	Ref.
2009	(United States) Ryler DeHeart	(Australia) Carsten Ball	6–2, 3–6, 7–5	
2008	(United States) Michael Yani	(United States) Sam Warburg	7–6(5), 2–6, 6–3	
2007	(United States) Kevin Kim	(United States) Bobby Reynolds	6–4, 0–6, 6–3	
2006	(United States) Sam Querrey	(United States) Sam Warburg	7–6(6), 6–1	
2005	(United States) Cecil Mamiit	(United States) Paul Goldstein	6–4, 6–4	

=== Doubles ===
Year	Champions	Runners-up	Score
2009	(Australia) Carsten Ball (United States) Travis Rettenmaier	(Australia) Adam Feeney (Australia) Nathan Healey	6–3, 6–4
2008	(United States) Nicholas Monroe (United States) Michael Yani	(United States) Jan-Michael Gambill (United States) Scott Oudsema	6–4, 6–4
2007	(Israel) Harel Levy (United States) Sam Warburg	(United States) Eric Nunez (Netherlands Antilles) Jean-Julien Rojer	6–4, 6–4
2006	(United States) Scott Lipsky (United States) David Martin	(United States) Nicholas Monroe (Romania) Horia Tecău	6–0, 6–4
2005	(United States) Brandon Coupe (United States) Justin Gimelstob	(Mexico) Santiago González (Brazil) Bruno Soares	6–2, 3–6, 7–6(1)
