= Calabasas Pro Tennis Championships =

ATP Challenger Tour
- Location: Calabasas, California, United States
- Venue: Calabasas Tennis & Swim Center
- Category: ATP Challenger Series
- Surface: Hard / Outdoors
- Draw: 32S/16Q/16D
- Prize money: $50,000
- Website: Official Website

The Calabasas Pro Tennis Championships is a tennis tournament held in Calabasas, California, United States since 2001. Since 2012 the tournament has been part of the ITF Men's Circuit and is played on outdoor hardcourts. The event was part of the ATP Challenger Tour from 2001 until 2010.

Former French Open champion Michael Chang won the event in 2002.

== Past finals ==
=== Singles ===
Year	Champion	Runner-up	Score
2010	(Australia) Marinko Matosevic	(United States) Ryan Sweeting	2–6, 6–4, 6–3
2009	(United States) Donald Young	(United States) Michael Russell	7–6(4), 6–1
2008	(United States) Vince Spadea	(United States) Sam Warburg	7–6, 6–4
2007	(United States) Robert Kendrick	(United States) Donald Young	3–6, 7–6, 6–4
2006	(Australia) Mark Philippoussis	(United States) Amer Delic	6–7, 7–6, 6–3
2005	(United States) Brian Vahaly	(Germany) Denis Gremelmayr	3–6, 6–2, 6–2
2004	(Croatia) Ivo Karlović	(United States) Alex Bogomolov Jr.	7–6, 6–3
2003	(France) Jérôme Golmard	(Germany) Lars Burgsmüller	6–3, 7–5
2002	(United States) Michael Chang	(United States) Cecil Mamiit	6–3, 7–5
2001	(Brazil) André Sá	(United States) Michael Russell	4–6, 6–2, 6–4

=== Doubles ===
Year	Champion	Runner-up	Score
2010	(United States) Ryan Harrison (United States) Travis Rettenmaier	(South Africa) Rik de Voest (United States) Bobby Reynolds	6–3, 6–3
2009	(Mexico) Santiago González (Germany) Simon Stadler	(Philippines) Treat Conrad Huey (India) Harsh Mankad	6–2, 5–7, [10–4]
2008	(Serbia) Ilija Bozoljac (Serbia) Dušan Vemić	(India) Somdev Devvarman (Australia) Nathan Healey	1–6, 6–3, [13–11]
2007	(United States) John Isner (United States) Brian Wilson	(United States) Robert Kendrick (Philippines) Cecil Mamiit	7–6, 4–6, [10–8]
2006	(United States) Robert Kendrick (Philippines) Cecil Mamiit	(Israel) Harel Levy (United States) Sam Warburg	5–7, 6–4, [10–5]
2005	(United States) Amer Delic (United States) Bobby Reynolds	(Austria) Zbynek Mlynarik (United States) Glenn Weiner	7–5, 7–6
2004	(United States) Graydon Oliver (United States) Travis Parrott	(Germany) Ivo Klec (Sweden) Robert Lindstedt	7–5, 6–3
2003	(United States) Justin Gimelstob (United States) Scott Humphries	(United States) Kevin Kim (United States) Jim Thomas	6–3, 6–3
2002	(South Africa) Paul Rosner (United States) Glenn Weiner	(United States) Justin Gimelstob (United States) Paul Goldstein	6–2, 4–6, 7–6
2001	(Czech Republic) Ota Fukárek (Switzerland) Ivo Heuberger	(Australia) Paul Hanley (Australia) Nathan Healey	7–5, 3–6, 7–6
