= Sam Warburg =

American tennis player

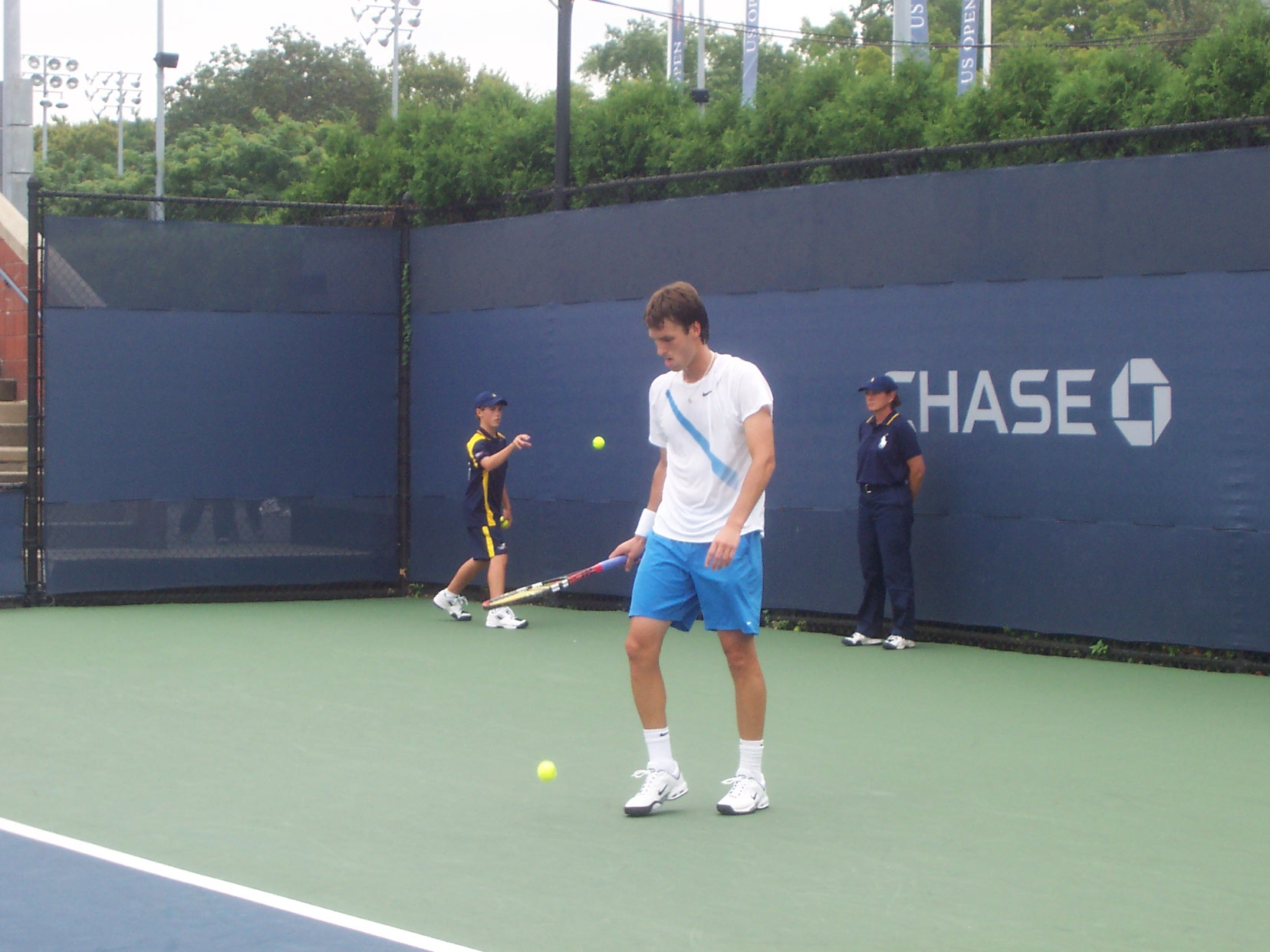
- Sam Warburg at the 2007 US Open
- Country (sports): United States
- Residence: Sacramento, California, United States
- Born: April 29, 1983 (age 42); Sacramento, California
- Height: 6 ft 3 in (1.91 m)
- Turned pro: 2005
- Retired: 2009
- Plays: Right-handed (two-handed backhand)
- College: Stanford University
- Coach: Doug Atkinson
- Prize money: $301,995

Singles
- Career record: 5–10 (Grand Slam, ATP Tour level, and Davis Cup)
- Career titles: 0
- Highest ranking: No. 132 (23 June 2008)

Grand Slam singles results
- Australian Open: 2R (2008)
- Wimbledon: 1R (2007)
- US Open: 2R (2008)

Doubles
- Career record: 0–2 (Grand Slam, ATP Tour level, and Davis Cup)
- Career titles: 0
- Highest ranking: No. 117 (26 November 2007)

Grand Slam doubles results
- Wimbledon: Q1 (2008)
- US Open: 1R (2004)
- Last updated on: 2 July 2021.

Sam Warburg (born April 29, 1983) is an American retired tennis player.

== College career ==
Warburg was a 4-time All-American for Stanford University, and won the NCAA Doubles Championship in 2004 while partnered with KC Corkery. He also won the 2004 & 2005 PAC-10 Singles titles.

== Professional career ==
Warburg turned pro after graduating from Stanford in 2005. He broke into the top 200 late in 2006.

Warburg spent most of 2007 & 2008 ranked in the top-200 in the world, reaching a high of #132 in May 2008. He also reached a high doubles ranking of #117 in November 2007. In 2009, he retired, citing a lack of excitement for the game, and the wear and tear the travel was having on his life.

== Performance timeline ==
Key
W	F	SF	QF	#R	RR	Q#	DNQ	A	NH

(W) winner; (F) finalist; (SF) semifinalist; (QF) quarterfinalist; (#R) rounds 4, 3, 2, 1; (RR) round-robin stage; (Q#) qualification round; (DNQ) did not qualify; (A) absent; (NH) not held; (SR) strike rate (events won / competed); (W–L) win–loss record.

=== Singles ===
Tournament	2006	2007	2008	2009	SR	W–L	Win %
Grand Slam tournaments
Australian Open	A	Q1	2R	A	0 / 1	1–1	50%
French Open	A	A	A	A	0 / 0	0–0	–
Wimbledon	Q1	1R	Q1	Q2	0 / 1	0–1	0%
US Open	Q1	Q2	2R	Q1	0 / 1	1–1	50%
Win–loss	0–0	0–1	2–2	0–0	0 / 3	2–3	40%
ATP Tour Masters 1000
Indian Wells Masters	1R	Q1	Q1	Q1	0 / 1	0–1	0%
Miami Open	A	Q1	2R	A	0 / 1	1–1	50%
Win–loss	0–1	0–0	1–1	0–0	0 / 2	1–2	33%

== ATP Challenger and ITF Futures finals ==
=== Singles: 13 (6–7) ===
Legend ATP Challenger (1–6) ITF Futures (5–1)	Finals by surface Hard (6–7) Clay (0–0) Grass (0–0) Carpet (0–0)

Result	W–L	Date	Tournament	Tier	Surface	Opponent	Score
Win	1–0	Aug 2004	USA F22, Decatur	Futures	Hard	(United States) Tres Davis	6–4, 6–2
Win	2–0	Jul 2005	USA F19, Godfrey	Futures	Hard	(United Kingdom) Jamie Baker	7–6^{(8–6)}, 6–3
Loss	2–1	Aug 2005	USA F20, Decatur	Futures	Hard	(United States) Michael Yani	5–7, 4–6
Win	3–1	Sep 2005	USA F23, Costa Mesa	Futures	Hard	(United States) Wayne Odesnik	7–5, 6–4
Win	4–1	Jan 2006	Mexico F1, Naucalpan	Futures	Hard	(Venezuela) David Navarrete	6–3, 6–1
Win	5–1	Apr 2006	Korea F3, Seogwipo	Futures	Hard	(Russia) Pavel Ivanov	7–5, 6–2
Loss	5–2	Jun 2006	Yuba City, United States	Challenger	Hard	(United States) Sam Querrey	6–7^{(6–8)}, 1–6
Loss	5–3	Dec 2006	Maui, United States	Challenger	Hard	(United States) Michael Russell	1–6, 0–6
Win	6–3	Aug 2007	Bronx, United States	Challenger	Hard	(Mexico) Bruno Echagaray	6–3, 6–7^{(5–7)}, 6–3
Loss	6–4	Sep 2007	New Orleans, United States	Challenger	Hard	(South Africa) Kevin Anderson	4–6, 0–6
Loss	6–5	Apr 2008	Mexico City, Mexico	Challenger	Hard	(Poland) Dawid Olejniczak	4–6, 3–6
Loss	6–6	Jun 2008	Yuba City, United States	Challenger	Hard	(United States) Michael Yani	6–7^{(5–7)}, 6–2, 3–6
Loss	6–7	Oct 2008	Calabasas, United States	Challenger	Hard	(United States) Vince Spadea	6–7^{(5–7)}, 4–6

=== Doubles: 20 (12–8) ===
Legend ATP Challenger (6–4) ITF Futures (6–4)	Finals by surface Hard (12–7) Clay (0–1) Grass (0–0) Carpet (0–0)

Result	W–L	Date	Tournament	Tier	Surface	Partner	Opponents	Score
Win	1–0	Jul 2003	USA F21, Joplin	Futures	Hard	(United States) Jeremy Wurtzman	(United States) Scott Lipsky (United States) David Martin	7–5, 7–5
Loss	1–1	Jul 2004	USA F16, Chico	Futures	Hard	(United States) KC Corkery	(United States) Lester Cook (United States) Jason Cook	5–7, 6–7^{(5–7)}
Win	2–1	Jun 2005	USA F14, Chico	Futures	Hard	(United States) Jeremy Wurtzman	(United States) Patrick Briaud (Serbia and Montenegro) Aleksandar Vlaski	1–6, 6–4, 6–3
Win	3–1	Jul 2005	USA F19, Godfrey	Futures	Hard	(United States) Philip Stolt	(South Africa) Andrew Anderson (New Zealand) Daniel King-Turner	6–4, 6–4
Loss	3–2	Aug 2005	Ecuador F1, Guayaquil	Futures	Hard	(United States) Nicholas Monroe	(Argentina) Brian Dabul (Uruguay) Marcel Felder	5–7, 7–5, 2–6
Win	4–2	Dec 2005	Israel F3, Raanana	Futures	Hard	(United States) Nicholas Monroe	(Croatia) Ivan Cerovic (North Macedonia) Lazar Magdinchev	6–3, 7–6^{(7–4)}
Loss	4–3	Jan 2006	Guatemala F1, Guatemala City	Futures	Hard	(United States) Nicholas Monroe	(El Salvador) Rafael Arevalo (Dominican Republic) Jhonson Garcia	6–7^{(2–7)}, 6–1, 5–7
Win	5–3	Jan 2006	Mexico F1, Naucalpan	Futures	Hard	(United States) Nicholas Monroe	(Mexico) Daniel Langre (Mexico) Victor Romero	3–6, 6–4, 6–4
Win	6–3	Feb 2006	Costa Rica F1, San Jose	Futures	Hard	(United States) Nicholas Monroe	(France) Arnaud Agniel (Ecuador) Luis Fernando Manrique	7–6^{(8–6)}, 6–0
Loss	6–4	Mar 2006	Korea F2, Andong	Futures	Hard	(Serbia and Montenegro) Aleksandar Vlaski	(South Korea) Chung Hee-Seok (South Korea) An Jae-Sung	3–6, 6–7^{(3–7)}
Win	7–4	Apr 2006	Valencia, United States	Challenger	Hard	(United States) John-Paul Fruttero	(South Africa) Rik De Voest (United States) Glenn Weiner	7–5, 6–3
Win	8–4	Sep 2006	New Orleans, United States	Challenger	Hard	(Philippines) Cecil Mamiit	(United States) Chris Drake (United States) David Martin	7–6^{(7–3)}, 6–0
Loss	8–5	Oct 2006	Calabasas, United States	Challenger	Hard	(Israel) Harel Levy	(United States) Robert Kendrick (Philippines) Cecil Mamiit	7–5, 4–6, [5–10]
Win	9–5	Apr 2007	Valencia, United States	Challenger	Hard	(Israel) Harel Levy	(Philippines) Eric Taino (Philippines) Cecil Mamiit	6–2, 6–4
Loss	9–6	May 2007	Forest Hills, United States	Challenger	Clay	(United States) Patrick Briaud	(United States) Rajeev Ram (United States) Bobby Reynolds	3–6, 4–6
Win	10–6	Jun 2007	Yuba City, United States	Challenger	Hard	(Israel) Harel Levy	(United States) Eric Nunez (Netherlands Antilles) Jean-Julien Rojer	6–4, 6–4
Loss	10–7	Oct 2007	Sacramento, United States	Challenger	Hard	(United States) John-Paul Fruttero	(United States) Robert Kendrick (United States) Brian Wilson	5–7, 6–7^{(8–10)}
Win	11–7	Nov 2007	Champaign-Urbana, United States	Challenger	Hard	(Israel) Harel Levy	(United States) Scott Lipsky (United States) Brendan Evans	6–4, 6–0
Win	12–7	Nov 2007	Knoxville, United States	Challenger	Hard	(Israel) Harel Levy	(United Kingdom) Jamie Baker (United States) Brendan Evans	3–6, 6–2, [10–6]
Loss	12–8	Feb 2009	Wroclaw, Poland	Challenger	Hard	(Germany) Benedikt Dorsch	(Thailand) Sonchat Ratiwatana (Thailand) Sanchai Ratiwatana	4–6, 6–3, [8–10]
