= Wrocław Open =

Defunct tennis tournament
- Event name: Wrocław Open
- Founded: 2000
- Abolished: 2017
- Editions: 13
- Location: Wrocław, Poland
- Venue: Hala Orbita
- Category: ATP Challenger Tour, Tretorn SERIE+
- Surface: Hard (indoor)
- Draw: 32S/32Q/16D
- Website: Official website

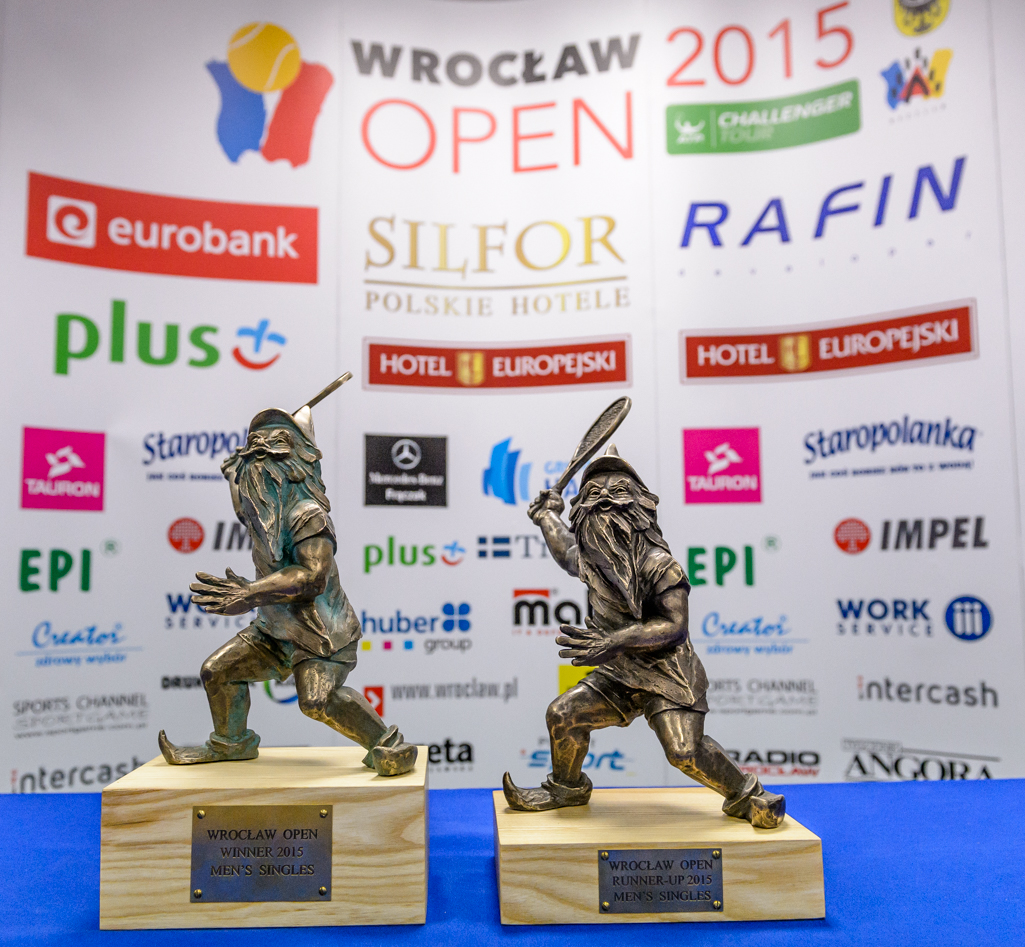
Wrocław Dwarfs, which were presented as winners' trophies at the Wrocław Open 2015 to 2017.

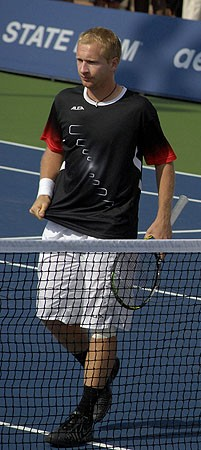
Czech Lukáš Dlouhý is the only player to have both the singles and the doubles in Wrocław, partnering Martin Štěpánek for the doubles title in 2005, and beating Tomáš Zíb for the singles title in 2006

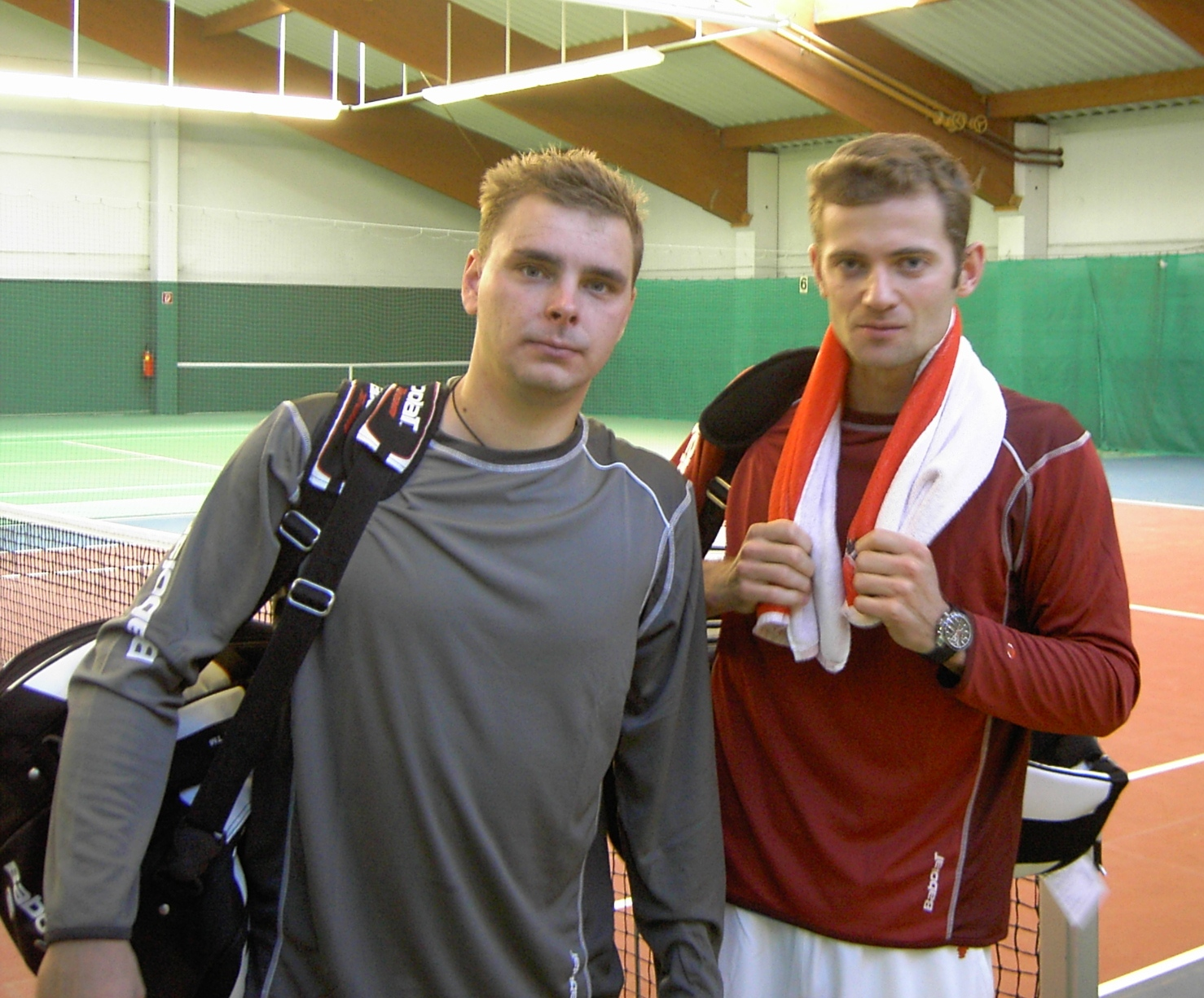
Pole team of Mariusz Fyrstenberg and Marcin Matkowski won the doubles title in Wrocław in 2006

The Wrocław Open (formerly known as KGHM Dialog Polish Indoors) was a professional tennis tournament played on indoor hard courts. It was part of the Association of Tennis Professionals (ATP) Challenger Tour. It was held at the Hala Orbita in Wrocław, Poland. The record holder with two doubles titles is Lukáš Rosol.

== Past finals ==
=== Singles ===
Year	Champion	Runner-up	Score
2017	(Austria) Jürgen Melzer	(Poland) Michał Przysiężny	6–4, 6–3
2016	(Switzerland) Marco Chiudinelli	(Czech Republic) Jan Hernych	6–3, 7–6^{(11–9)}
2015	(Uzbekistan) Farrukh Dustov	(Bosnia and Herzegovina) Mirza Bašić	6–3, 6–4
2010-2014	Not Held		
2009	(Germany) Michael Berrer	(Russia) Alexandre Kudryavtsev	6–3, 6–4
2008	(Belgium) Kristof Vliegen	(Austria) Jürgen Melzer	6–4, 3–6, 6–3
2007	(Austria) Werner Eschauer	(Czech Republic) Tomáš Zíb	5–7, 6–4, 6–4
2006	(Czech Republic) Lukáš Dlouhý	(Czech Republic) Tomáš Zíb	7–6(2), 2–6, 6–3
2005	(Czech Republic) Robin Vik	(Czech Republic) Michal Tabara	6–4, 6–3
2004	(Slovakia) Karol Beck	(Czech Republic) Jan Hernych	6–7(4), 6–2, 6–2
2003	(Slovakia) Karol Kučera	(Russia) Igor Kunitsyn	6–2, 6–1
2002	(Italy) Davide Sanguinetti	(France) Antony Dupuis	6–3, 6–2
2001	(Germany) Axel Pretzsch	(France) Antony Dupuis	7–5, 7–6(1)
2000	(Czech Republic) Martin Damm	(Italy) Gianluca Pozzi	4–6, 6–4, 6–3

=== Doubles ===
Year	Champions	Runners-up	Score
2017	(Canada) Adil Shamasdin (Belarus) Andrei Vasilevski	(Russia) Mikhail Elgin (Ukraine) Denys Molchanov	6–3, 3–6, [21–19]
2016	(France) Pierre-Hugues Herbert (France) Albano Olivetti	(Croatia) Nikola Mektić (Croatia) Antonio Šančić	6–3, 7–6^{(7–4)}
2015	(Germany) Philipp Petzschner (Germany) Tim Pütz	(Canada) Frank Dancevic (Poland) Andriej Kapaś	7–6^{(7–4)}, 6–3
2010-2014	Not Held		
2009	(Thailand) Sanchai Ratiwatana (Thailand) Sonchat Ratiwatana	(Germany) Benedikt Dorsch (United States) Sam Warburg	6–4, 3–6, 10–8
2008	(United States) James Cerretani (Czech Republic) Lukáš Rosol (2)	(Austria) Werner Eschauer (Austria) Jürgen Melzer	6–7(7), 6–3, 10–7
2007	(Czech Republic) Lukáš Rosol (1) (Czech Republic) Jan Vacek	(Slovakia) Michal Mertiňák (Switzerland) Jean-Claude Scherrer	7–5, 7–6(4)
2006	(Poland) Mariusz Fyrstenberg (Poland) Marcin Matkowski	(Czech Republic) Lukáš Dlouhý (Czech Republic) Pavel Šnobel	3–6, 6–1, 12–10
2005	(Czech Republic) Lukáš Dlouhý (Czech Republic) Martin Štěpánek	(United States) Jason Marshall (United States) Huntley Montgomery	6–2, 5–7, 6–4
2004	(Slovakia) Dominik Hrbatý (Germany) Michael Kohlmann	(Poland) Bartłomiej Dąbrowski (Poland) Łukasz Kubot	7–5, 6–3
2003	(Czech Republic) Petr Luxa (Czech Republic) David Škoch	(Czech Republic) Petr Pála (Czech Republic) Pavel Vízner	6–4, 6–4
2002	(Australia) Ben Ellwood (Australia) Stephen Huss	(North Macedonia) Aleksandar Kitinov (Sweden) Johan Landsberg	6–7(3), 7–5, 7–6(6)
2001	(Zimbabwe) Wayne Black (South Africa) Jason Weir-Smith	(Austria) Julian Knowle (Germany) Michael Kohlmann	6–3, 6–4
2000	(Czech Republic) Petr Kovačka (Czech Republic) Pavel Kudrnáč	(Canada) Jocelyn Robichaud (United Kingdom) Kyle Spencer	3–6, 7–6, 6–4
