= Ryler DeHeart =

American tennis player

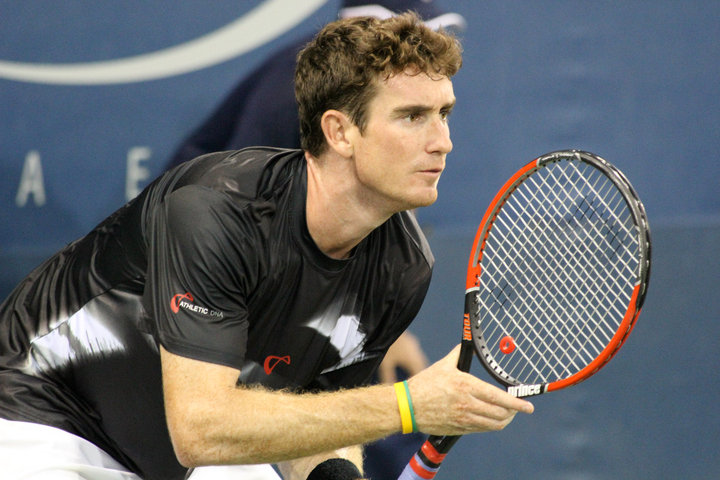
- Country (sports): United States
- Residence: Champaign, Illinois, U.S.
- Born: January 3, 1984 (age 42) Kauai, Hawaii, U.S.
- Height: 6 ft 0 in (1.83 m)
- Turned pro: 2006
- Plays: Left-handed (one-handed backhand)
- Prize money: $214,290

Singles
- Career record: 1–4
- Career titles: 0
- Highest ranking: No. 174 (May 3, 2010)
- Current ranking: No. 987 (January 8, 2012)

Grand Slam singles results
- Australian Open: Q1 (2010)
- French Open: Q3 (2010)
- Wimbledon: Q3 (2010)
- US Open: 2R (2008)

Doubles
- Career record: 0–1
- Career titles: 0
- Highest ranking: No. 120 (November 22, 2010)

Ryler DeHeart (born March 1, 1984) is an American former professional tennis player and current professional pickleball player. He reached his tennis singles career high ranking of 174 on May 3, 2010. He was coached by Brad Dancer. DeHeart resides in Champaign, Illinois.

== Professional career ==
His first win on the ATP Tour came as a qualifier at the 2008 US Open where he beat Olivier Rochus in five sets. He lost to Rafael Nadal in the next round, 1–6, 2–6, 4–6, despite taking a 3–0 lead in the third set. He predominantly played Challenger tournaments.

On June 7, 2009, he won his first title on the ATP Challenger Tour, with a 6–2, 3–6, 7–5 victory over Carsten Ball in the final of the Yuba City Challenger in California.

== Career titles ==
=== Singles (3) ===
Legend
Grand Slam (0)
ATP Masters Series (0)
ATP Tour (0)
ATP Challenger (1)
ITF Futures (2)

No.	Date	Tournament	Surface	Opponent	Score
1.	July 24, 2006	Illinois, United States	Hard	(United States) Todd Paul	6–7^{(2)}, 6–2, 6–1
2.	July 30, 2007	Illinois, United States	Hard	(United States) Matt Bruch	6–4, 6–3
3.	June 1, 2009	Yuba City, United States	Hard	(Australia) Carsten Ball	6–2, 3–6, 7–5

=== Doubles (2) ===
Legend
Grand Slam (0)
ATP Masters Series (0)
ATP Tour (0)
ATP Challenger (2)
ITF Futures (0)

No.	Date	Tournament	Surface	Partner	Opponents	Score
1.	January 31, 2010	Hawaii, United States	Hard	(South Africa) Kevin Anderson	(South Korea) Im Kyu-tae (Austria) Martin Slanar	3–6, 7–6^{(2)}, [15–13]
2.	May 15, 2010	Sarasota, United States	Clay	(United States) Brian Battistone	(Germany) Gero Kretschmer (Germany) Alex Satschko	5–7, 7–6^{(4)}, [10–8]

== Collegiate career ==
DeHeart played college tennis at the University of Illinois at Urbana-Champaign, where he achieved a number one in the ITA singles rankings and was a two-time All-American. As a junior, he won the ITA National Intercollegiate Indoor Singles Championship. As a senior, he was a semifinalist at the ITA All-American Championships and won the consolation title at the ITA National Indoor Championships. He finished his career with a singles record of 138–36 (most wins in Illinois history) and a doubles record of 104–38.

== See also ==
- List of professional pickleball players
