= 2009 Challenger of Dallas =

Professional tennis tournament

- Date: February 2–7, 2010
- Edition: 11th
- Location: Dallas, United States

Champions

Singles
- (United States) Ryan Sweeting

Doubles
- (India) Prakash Amritraj / (United States) Rajeev Ram
- Challenger of Dallas

The 2009 Challenger of Dallas was a professional tennis tournament played on indoor hard courts. It was part of the 2009 ATP Challenger Tour. It took place in Dallas, United States, between 12 and 17 February 2010.

== Singles main-draw entrants ==
=== Seeds ===
Country	Player	Rank^{1}	Seed
USA	Kevin Kim	112	1
USA	Amer Delić	127	2
USA	Jesse Levine	130	3
USA	Donald Young	133	4
USA	Brendan Evans	156	5
BRA	Ricardo Mello	163	6
USA	Rajeev Ram	202	7
USA	Ryan Sweeting	206	8

- Rankings are as of January 19, 2009

=== Other entrants ===
The following players received wildcards into the singles main draw:

- (United States) Chase Buchanan
- (United States) Amer Delić
- (United States) Alexander Domijan
- (United States) Donald Young

The following players received entry from the qualifying draw:

- (Germany) Tobias Clemens
- (Mexico) Luís Manuel Flores
- (Philippines) Cecil Mamiit
- (United States) Scott Oudsema

== Champions ==
=== Men's singles ===
(United States) Ryan Sweeting def. (United States) Brendan Evans, 6–4, 6–3

=== Men's doubles ===
(India) Prakash Amritraj / (United States) Rajeev Ram def. (United States) Patrick Briaud / (United States) Jason Marshall, 6–3, 4–6, 10–8
