= 2016 RBC Tennis Championships of Dallas =

Tennis tournament

- Date: 1–6 February
- Edition: 19th
- Draw: 32S / 16D
- Prize money: $100,000
- Surface: Hard (indoor)
- Location: Dallas, United States

Champions

Singles
- (United Kingdom) Kyle Edmund

Doubles
- (United States) Nicolas Meister / (United States) Eric Quigley
- RBC Tennis Championships of Dallas

The 2016 RBC Tennis Championships of Dallas was a professional tennis tournament played on hard courts. It was the 19th edition of the tournament which was part of the 2016 ATP Challenger Tour. It took place in Dallas, United States between 1 and 6 February 2016.

== Singles main-draw entrants ==
=== Seeds ===
Country	Player	Rank^{1}	Seed
AUS	Sam Groth	67	1
GBR	Kyle Edmund	88	2
GER	Benjamin Becker	101	3
USA	Tim Smyczek	108	4
MDA	Radu Albot	122	5
JPN	Tatsuma Ito	125	6
AUS	John-Patrick Smith	131	7
USA	Bjorn Fratangelo	132	8

- ^{1} Rankings are as of January 18, 2016.

=== Other entrants ===
The following players received wildcards into the singles main draw:

- (South Africa) Jean Andersen
- (United States) Sekou Bangoura
- (United States) Ernesto Escobedo
- (United States) Alex Kuznetsov

The following players received entry into the singles main draw as alternates:

- (United States) Mitchell Krueger
- (Czech Republic) Marek Michalička

The following player received entry into the singles main draw as a lucky loser:

- (Colombia) Nicolás Barrientos

The following players received entry from the qualifying draw:

- (Australia) Marinko Matosevic
- (United States) Eric Quigley
- (United States) Clay Thompson
- (Russia) Mikhail Vaks

== Champions ==
=== Singles ===
- (United Kingdom) Kyle Edmund def. (United Kingdom) Daniel Evans, 6–3, 6–2

=== Doubles ===
- (United States) Nicolas Meister / (United States) Eric Quigley def. (United States) Sekou Bangoura / (South Africa) Dean O'Brien, 6–1, 6–1
