= 2017 RBC Tennis Championships of Dallas =

- Date: 30 January – 4 February
- Edition: 20th
- Draw: 32S / 16D
- Prize money: $100,000
- Surface: Hard (indoor)
- Location: Dallas, United States

Champions

Singles
- (United States) Ryan Harrison

Doubles
- (Republic of Ireland) David O'Hare / (United Kingdom) Joe Salisbury
- RBC Tennis Championships of Dallas

The 2017 RBC Tennis Championships of Dallas was a professional tennis tournament played on hard courts. It was the 20th edition of the tournament and part of the 2017 ATP Challenger Tour. It took place in Dallas, United States between 30 January and 4 February 2017.

== Singles main-draw entrants ==
=== Seeds ===
Country	Player	Rank^{1}	Seed
USA	Ryan Harrison	82	1
USA	Taylor Fritz	93	2
KAZ	Mikhail Kukushkin	98	3
USA	Frances Tiafoe	108	4
GER	Benjamin Becker	119	5
USA	Denis Kudla	130	6
USA	Rajeev Ram	130	7
USA	Tim Smyczek	136	8

- ^{1} Rankings are as of January 16, 2017.

=== Other entrants ===
The following players received wildcards into the singles main draw:

- (United States) Marcos Giron
- (United States) Mackenzie McDonald
- (United States) Eric Quigley
- (United States) Chase Wood

The following players received entry from the qualifying draw:

- (Colombia) Alejandro Gómez
- (United States) Christian Harrison
- (Ukraine) Denys Molchanov
- (United States) Raymond Sarmiento

== Champions ==
=== Singles ===
- (United States) Ryan Harrison def. (United States) Taylor Fritz 6–3, 6–3.

=== Doubles ===
- (Republic of Ireland) David O'Hare / (United Kingdom) Joe Salisbury def. (India) Jeevan Nedunchezhiyan / (Indonesia) Christopher Rungkat 6–7^{(6–8)}, 6–3, [11–9].
