= 2015 RBC Tennis Championships of Dallas =

- Date: 2–8 February
- Edition: 18th
- Draw: 32S / 16D
- Prize money: $100,000
- Surface: Hard (indoor)
- Location: Dallas, United States

Champions

Singles
- (United States) Tim Smyczek

Doubles
- (Ukraine) Denys Molchanov / (Russia) Andrey Rublev
- RBC Tennis Championships of Dallas

The 2015 RBC Tennis Championships of Dallas was a professional tennis tournament played on indoor hard courts. It was the 18th edition of the tournament which was part of the 2015 ATP Challenger Tour. It took place in Dallas, United States between 2 and 8 February 2015.

== Singles main-draw entrants ==
=== Seeds ===
Country	Player	Rank^{1}	Seed
KAZ	Mikhail Kukushkin	51	1
RUS	Teymuraz Gabashvili	67	2
SLO	Blaž Rola	80	3
USA	Tim Smyczek	112	4
USA	Denis Kudla	123	5
ROU	Victor Hănescu	134	6
USA	Rajeev Ram	140	7
POR	Gastão Elias	143	8

- ^{1} Rankings are as of January 26, 2015.

=== Other entrants ===
The following players received wildcards into the singles main draw:

- (United States) Thai-Son Kwiatkowski
- (United States) Eric Quigley
- (United States) Connor Smith
- (United States) Ryan Sweeting

The following players got into the singles main draw as a special exempt:

- (United States) Nicolas Meister

The following players got into the singles main draw as an alternate:

- (United States) Jason Jung
- (Argentina) Agustín Velotti

The following players received entry from the qualifying draw:

- (Bulgaria) Dimitar Kutrovsky
- (United Kingdom) Cameron Norrie
- (Russia) Andrey Rublev
- (France) Maxime Tchoutakian

== Champions ==
=== Singles ===
- (United States) Tim Smyczek def. (United States) Rajeev Ram, 6–2, 4–1, ret.

=== Doubles ===
- (Ukraine) Denys Molchanov / (Russia) Andrey Rublev def. (Mexico) Hans Hach Verdugo / (Mexico) Luis Patiño, 6–4, 7–6^{(7–5)}
