= 2010 Challenger of Dallas – Doubles =

Doubles
- 2010 Challenger of Dallas

Final
- Champions: (United States) Scott Lipsky (United States) David Martin
- Runners-up: (Canada) Vasek Pospisil (Canada) Adil Shamasdin
- Score: 7–6^{(9–7)}, 6–3

Events
Singles	Doubles
- Challenger of Dallas

Prakash Amritraj and Rajeev Ram were the defending champions, but they chose not to participate this year.
Scott Lipsky and David Martin won in the final 7–6^{(9–7)}, 6–3 against Vasek Pospisil and Adil Shamasdin.

== Seeds ==
1. (United States) Scott Lipsky / (United States) David Martin (champions)
2. (Philippines) Treat Conrad Huey / (India) Harsh Mankad (quarterfinals)
3. (United States) Lester Cook / (United States) Travis Rettenmaier (first round)
4. (United States) Bobby Reynolds / (United States) Ryan Sweeting (first round)

== Draw ==
Key

- Q = Qualifier
- WC = Wild card
- LL = Lucky loser
- Alt = Alternate
- ITF = ITF entry
- PR = Protected ranking
- SR = Special ranking
- SE = Special exempt
- JE = Junior exempt
- JR = Junior Accelerator Programme entrant
- CO = College Accelerator Programme entrant
- NG = Next Gen Accelerator Program entrant
- w/o = Walkover
- r = Retired
- d = Defaulted

=== Draw ===
First round
1	(United States) S Lipsky (United States) D Martin	6	6
Q	(United Kingdom) D Inglot (India) P Raja	4	4
WC	(United States) D Britton (Bulgaria) G Dimitrov	6	1	[6]
WC	(Mexico) L Herrera (Mexico) J Herrera-Eguiluz	2	6	[10]
4	(United States) B Reynolds (United States) R Sweeting	6	1	[5]
(Germany) L Pörschke (Austria) M Slanar	4	6	[10]
(South Korea) KT Im (Japan) H Kondo	6	6
WC	(United States) B Battistone (United States) D Battistone	4	4
(United States) S Jenkins (United States) J Witten	4	6	[12]
(United States) A Kuznetsov (Netherlands) I Sijsling	6	2	[10]
(Canada) V Pospisil (Canada) A Shamasdin	6	6
3	(United States) L Cook (United States) T Rettenmaier	3	3
(Germany) A Begemann (Brazil) M Torres	3	6	[10]
(South Africa) K Anderson (United States) R DeHeart	6	4	[8]
(United States) A Bogomolov Jr. (Sweden) M Ryderstedt	1	6	[2]
2	(Philippines) TC Huey (India) H Mankad	6	3	[10]

Quarterfinals
1	(United States) S Lipsky (United States) D Martin	6	0
WC	(Mexico) L Herrera (Mexico) J Herrera-Eguiluz	1	1	r
(Germany) L Pörschke (Austria) M Slanar	6	6
(South Korea) KT Im (Japan) H Kondo	3	1
(United States) S Jenkins (United States) J Witten
(Canada) V Pospisil (Canada) A Shamasdin	w/o
(Germany) A Begemann (Brazil) M Torres	3	6	[12]
2	(Philippines) TC Huey (India) H Mankad	6	2	[10]

Semifinals
1	(United States) S Lipsky (United States) D Martin	6	7^{7}
(Germany) L Pörschke (Austria) M Slanar	4	6^{1}
(Canada) V Pospisil (Canada) A Shamasdin	6	6
(Germany) A Begemann (Brazil) M Torres	1	4

Final
1	(United States) S Lipsky (United States) D Martin	7^{9}	6
(Canada) V Pospisil (Canada) A Shamasdin	6^{7}	3
