= 2010 Challenger of Dallas =

- Date: February 1–6, 2010
- Edition: 12th
- Location: Dallas, United States

Champions

Singles
- (United States) Ryan Sweeting

Doubles
- (United States) Scott Lipsky / (United States) David Martin
- Challenger of Dallas

The 2010 Challenger of Dallas was a professional tennis tournament played on indoor hard courts. It was part of the 2010 ATP Challenger Tour. It took place in Dallas, United States, between 1 and 6 February 2010.

== ATP entrants ==
=== Seeds ===
| Country | Player | Rank^{1} | Seed |
|---|---|---|---|
| USA | Jesse Levine | 110 | 1 |
| AUS | Carsten Ball | 129 | 2 |
| USA | Robert Kendrick | 138 | 3 |
| RSA | Kevin Anderson | 148 | 4 |
| USA | Michael Yani | 159 | 5 |
| USA | Jesse Witten | 163 | 6 |
| USA | Ryan Sweeting | 166 | 7 |
| PAR | Ramón Delgado | 184 | 8 |

- Rankings are as of January 18, 2010

=== Other entrants ===
The following players received wildcards into the singles main draw:

- (United States) Ryan Harrison
- (United States) Michael McClune
- (United States) Bobby Reynolds
- (United States) Dane Webb

The following players received entry from the qualifying draw:

- (Slovenia) Luka Gregorc
- (France) Jean-Noel Insausti
- (United States) Nicholas Monroe
- (Finland) Juho Paukku

== Champions ==
=== Singles ===
(United States) Ryan Sweeting def. (Australia) Carsten Ball, 6–4, 6–2

=== Doubles ===
(United States) Scott Lipsky / (United States) David Martin def. (Canada) Vasek Pospisil / (Canada) Adyl Shamasdin, 7–6^{(9–7)}, 6–3
