= 2009 Challenger of Dallas – Doubles =

Doubles
- 2009 Challenger of Dallas

Final
- Champions: (India) Prakash Amritraj (United States) Rajeev Ram
- Runners-up: (United States) Patrick Briaud (United States) Jason Marshall
- Score: 6–3, 4–6, [10–8]

Events
Singles	Doubles
- Challenger of Dallas

Benedikt Dorsch and Björn Phau were the defending champions, but they chose not to participate this year.
Prakash Amritraj and Rajeev Ram won in the final 6–3, 4–6, [10–8] against Patrick Briaud and Jason Marshall.

== Seeds ==
1. (India) Prakash Amritraj / (United States) Rajeev Ram (champions)
2. (United States) Todd Widom / (United States) Michael Yani (first round)
3. (United States) Brian Battistone / (United States) Dann Battistone (quarterfinals)
4. (Japan) Hiroki Kondo / (India) Ashutosh Singh (semifinals)

== Draw ==
Key

- Q = Qualifier
- WC = Wild card
- LL = Lucky loser
- Alt = Alternate
- ITF = ITF entry
- PR = Protected ranking
- SR = Special ranking
- SE = Special exempt
- JE = Junior exempt
- JR = Junior Accelerator Programme entrant
- CO = College Accelerator Programme entrant
- NG = Next Gen Accelerator Program entrant
- w/o = Walkover
- r = Retired
- d = Defaulted

=== Draw ===
First round
1	(India) P Amritraj (United States) R Ram	6	6
Q	(Romania) R Luchici (United States) J O'Neal	2	3
WC	(United States) B Joelson (United States) B Wooten	7^{7}	1	[1]
(United States) J Levine (Canada) P Polansky	6^{3}	6	[10]
4	(Japan) H Kondo (India) A Singh	6	6
(Paraguay) R Delgado (Brazil) R Mello	2	3
(United States) B Evans (United States) R Sweeting	7^{7}	6
(India) H Mankad (India) P Raja	6^{4}	3
LL	(United States) T Cole (United States) D Webb	1	4
WC	(United States) S Oudsema (United States) P Simmonds	6	6
(Germany) D Meffert (Sweden) M Ryderstedt	7	3	[8]
3	(United States) B Battistone (United States) D Battistone	5	6	[10]
(Japan) T Suzuki (Brazil) M Torres	7	6^{1}	[5]
WC	(United States) P Briaud (United States) J Marshall	5	7^{7}	[10]
(Mexico) S González (Ecuador) G Lapentti	6	6
2	(United States) T Widom (United States) M Yani	3	1

Quarterfinals
1	(India) P Amritraj (United States) R Ram	w/o
(United States) J Levine (Canada) P Polansky
4	(Japan) H Kondo (India) A Singh	7^{7}	6
(United States) B Evans (United States) R Sweeting	6^{5}	2
WC	(United States) S Oudsema (United States) P Simmonds	2	6	[10]
3	(United States) B Battistone (United States) D Battistone	6	3	[8]
WC	(United States) P Briaud (United States) J Marshall	w/o
2	(Mexico) S González (Ecuador) G Lapentti

Semifinals
1	(India) P Amritraj (United States) R Ram	7	4	[10]
4	(Japan) H Kondo (India) A Singh	5	6	[7]
WC	(United States) S Oudsema (United States) P Simmonds	7^{7}	4	[7]
WC	(United States) P Briaud (United States) J Marshall	6^{4}	6	[10]

Final
1	(India) P Amritraj (United States) R Ram	6	4	[10]
WC	(United States) P Briaud (United States) J Marshall	3	6	[8]
