= 2017 RBC Tennis Championships of Dallas – Singles =

Singles
- 2017 RBC Tennis Championships of Dallas

Final
- Champion: (United States) Ryan Harrison
- Runner-up: (United States) Taylor Fritz
- Score: 6–3, 6–3

Events
Singles	Doubles
- RBC Tennis Championships of Dallas

Kyle Edmund was the defending champion but chose not to defend his title.

Ryan Harrison won the title after defeating Taylor Fritz 6–3, 6–3 in the final.

== Seeds ==
1. (United States) Ryan Harrison (champion)
2. (United States) Taylor Fritz (final)
3. (Kazakhstan) Mikhail Kukushkin (second round)
4. (United States) Frances Tiafoe (quarterfinals)
5. (Germany) Benjamin Becker (first round)
6. (United States) Denis Kudla (semifinals)
7. (United States) Rajeev Ram (quarterfinals)
8. (United States) Tim Smyczek (first round)

== Draw ==
Key

- Q = Qualifier
- WC = Wild card
- LL = Lucky loser
- Alt = Alternate
- ITF = ITF entry
- PR = Protected ranking
- SR = Special ranking
- SE = Special exempt
- JE = Junior exempt
- JR = Junior Accelerator Programme entrant
- CO = College Accelerator Programme entrant
- NG = Next Gen Accelerator Program entrant
- w/o = Walkover
- r = Retired
- d = Defaulted

=== Finals ===
Semifinals
1	(United States) Ryan Harrison	6	6
(Japan) Tatsuma Ito	3	0
6	(United States) Denis Kudla	4	6	6^{2}
2	(United States) Taylor Fritz	6	2	7^{7}

Final
1	(United States) Ryan Harrison	6	6
2	(United States) Taylor Fritz	3	3

=== Top half ===
First round
1	(United States) R Harrison	6	6
WC	(United States) E Quigley	3	4
WC	(United States) M McDonald	6	6
(China) Z Li	4	3
(Argentina) M Trungelliti	6	7^{7}
WC	(United States) Chase Wood	2	6^{4}
Q	(United States) R Sarmiento	7	7
5	(Germany) B Becker	5	5
3	(Kazakhstan) M Kukushkin	6	6
(United States) D Novikov	4	2
(Japan) T Ito	6	6
Q	(Colombia) A Gómez	4	4
(United States) S Bangoura	5	6	7
Q	(Ukraine) D Molchanov	7	3	5
(Sweden) E Ymer	7^{8}	6
8	(United States) T Smyczek	6^{6}	3

Second round
1	(United States) R Harrison	6	7^{12}
WC	(United States) M McDonald	2	6^{10}
(Argentina) M Trungelliti	7^{8}	6
Q	(United States) R Sarmiento	6^{6}	1
3	(Kazakhstan) M Kukushkin	6	6^{3}	6^{6}
(Japan) T Ito	4	7^{7}	7^{8}
(United States) S Bangoura	3	5
(Sweden) E Ymer	6	7

Quarterfinals
1	(United States) R Harrison	6	6
(Argentina) M Trungelliti	4	1
(Japan) T Ito	6	6
(Sweden) E Ymer	4	4

Semifinals
1	(United States) R Harrison	6	6
(Japan) T Ito	3	0

=== Bottom half ===
First round
6	(United States) D Kudla	6	4	6
(Republic of Ireland) J McGee	3	6	1
(Serbia) N Milojević	1	3
(United States) A Krajicek	6	6
(China) D Wu	7^{7}	6
(United States) T Sandgren	6^{5}	3
Q	(United States) C Harrison	2	1
4	(United States) F Tiafoe	6	6
7	(United States) R Ram	6	2	6
(Belgium) K Coppejans	3	6	2
(United States) R Opelka	6	6
(Italy) S Caruso	1	3
(United States) B Baker	6^{5}	4
WC	(United States) M Giron	7^{7}	6
(China) Z Zhang	4	3
2	(United States) T Fritz	6	6

Second round
6	(United States) D Kudla	7^{7}	6
(United States) A Krajicek	6^{4}	3
(China) D Wu	2	6^{5}
4	(United States) F Tiafoe	6	7^{7}
7	(United States) R Ram	7^{7}	7^{7}
(United States) R Opelka	6^{4}	6^{1}
WC	(United States) M Giron	5	6	3
2	(United States) T Fritz	7	4	6

Quarterfinals
6	(United States) D Kudla	7^{7}	7^{7}
4	(United States) F Tiafoe	6^{5}	6^{1}
7	(United States) R Ram	3	2
2	(United States) T Fritz	6	6

Semifinals
6	(United States) D Kudla	4	6	6^{2}
2	(United States) T Fritz	6	2	7^{7}
