= 2009 Challenger of Dallas – Singles =

Singles
- 2009 Challenger of Dallas

Final
- Champion: (United States) Ryan Sweeting
- Runner-up: (United States) Brendan Evans
- Score: 6–4, 6–3

Events
Singles	Doubles
- Challenger of Dallas

Amer Delic was the defending champion; however, he lost to Brendan Evans in the quarterfinals.
Ryan Sweeting won in the final 6–4, 6–3, against Evans.

== Seeds ==
1. (United States) Kevin Kim (quarterfinals)
2. (United States) Amer Delic (quarterfinals)
3. (United States) Jesse Levine (second round)
4. (United States) Donald Young (first round)
5. (United States) Brendan Evans (final)
6. (Brazil) Ricardo Mello (second round)
7. (United States) Rajeev Ram (semifinals)
8. (United States) Ryan Sweeting (champion)

== Draw ==
Key

- Q = Qualifier
- WC = Wild card
- LL = Lucky loser
- Alt = Alternate
- ITF = ITF entry
- PR = Protected ranking
- SR = Special ranking
- SE = Special exempt
- JE = Junior exempt
- JR = Junior Accelerator Programme entrant
- CO = College Accelerator Programme entrant
- NG = Next Gen Accelerator Program entrant
- w/o = Walkover
- r = Retired
- d = Defaulted

=== Final four ===
Semifinals
8	(United States) Ryan Sweeting	6	7
7	(United States) Rajeev Ram	0	5
(India) Prakash Amritraj	4	4
5	(United States) Brendan Evans	6	6

Final
8	(United States) Ryan Sweeting	6	6
5	(United States) Brendan Evans	4	3

=== Top half ===
First round
1	(United States) K Kim	7^{7}	6
(Italy) A Stoppini	6^{3}	3
(United States) T Smyczek	3	6	6
(Germany) D Meffert	6	0	3
(Mexico) S González	4	3
(Canada) P Polansky	6	6
(Ecuador) G Lapentti	0	6^{3}
8	(United States) R Sweeting	6	7^{7}
4/WC	(United States) D Young	4	2
(United States) M Russell	6	6
(Venezuela) J de Armas	1	0
Q	(United States) S Oudsema	6	6
WC	(United States) Alexander Domijan	1	6^{4}
Q	(Mexico) LM Flores	6	7^{7}
(Sweden) M Ryderstedt	3	2
7	(United States) R Ram	6	6

Second round
1	(United States) K Kim	6	6
(United States) T Smyczek	1	1
(Canada) P Polansky	6^{1}	6^{8}
8	(United States) R Sweeting	7^{7}	7^{10}
(United States) M Russell	6	7^{7}
Q	(United States) S Oudsema	3	6^{4}
Q	(Mexico) LM Flores	5	4
7	(United States) R Ram	7	6

Quarterfinals
1	(United States) K Kim	5	2
8	(United States) R Sweeting	7	6
(United States) M Russell	7	4	5
7	(United States) R Ram	5	6	7

Semifinals
8	(United States) R Sweeting	6	7
7	(United States) R Ram	0	5

=== Bottom half ===
First round
6	(Brazil) R Mello	6	6
WC	(United States) C Buchanan	1	3
(United States) M Yani	3	2
(India) P Amritraj	6	6
(United States) S Jenkins	6	3	6
(France) J-C Faurel	3	6	4
(South Korea) W-S Jun	4	2
3	(United States) J Levine	6	6
5	(United States) B Evans	6	6
Q	(Germany) T Clemens	4	2
Q	(Philippines) C Mamiit	7	3	6
(Canada) F Niemeyer	5	6	1
(Paraguay) R Delgado	4	3
(United States) T Widom	6	6
(United States) A Kuznetsov	3	6^{5}
2/WC	(United States) A Delic	6	7^{7}

Second round
6	(Brazil) R Mello	5	3
(India) P Amritraj	7	6
(United States) S Jenkins	6	6
3	(United States) J Levine	4	1
5	(United States) B Evans	6	6
Q	(Philippines) C Mamiit	4	4
(United States) T Widom	6	6^{7}	4
2/WC	(United States) A Delic	4	7^{7}	6

Quarterfinals
(India) P Amritraj	7^{7}	4	6
(United States) S Jenkins	6^{3}	6	4
5	(United States) B Evans	7^{7}	2	7
2/WC	(United States) A Delic	6^{3}	6	5

Semifinals
(India) P Amritraj	4	4
5	(United States) B Evans	6	6

== Sources ==
- Main Draw
