= 2015 RBC Tennis Championships of Dallas – Doubles =

Doubles
- 2015 RBC Tennis Championships of Dallas

Final
- Champion: (Ukraine) Denys Molchanov (Russia) Andrey Rublev
- Runner-up: (Mexico) Hans Hach Verdugo (Mexico) Luis Patiño
- Score: 6–4, 7–6^{(7–5)}

Events
Singles	Doubles
- RBC Tennis Championships of Dallas

Samuel Groth and Chris Guccione were the defending champions but did not participate this year.

Denys Molchanov and Andrey Rublev won the title over qualifiers Hans Hach Verdugo and Luis Patiño, 6–4, 7–6^{(7–5)}.

== Seeds ==
1. (United States) James Cerretani / (Republic of Ireland) James Cluskey (first round)
2. (Philippines) Ruben Gonzales / (United Kingdom) Darren Walsh (semifinals)
3. (Venezuela) Luis David Martínez / (Colombia) Eduardo Struvay (first round)
4. (United States) Jason Jung / (United States) Evan King (first round)

== Draw ==
Key

- Q = Qualifier
- WC = Wild card
- LL = Lucky loser
- Alt = Alternate
- ITF = ITF entry
- PR = Protected ranking
- SR = Special ranking
- SE = Special exempt
- JE = Junior exempt
- JR = Junior Accelerator Programme entrant
- CO = College Accelerator Programme entrant
- NG = Next Gen Accelerator Program entrant
- w/o = Walkover
- r = Retired
- d = Defaulted

First round
1	(United States) J Cerretani (Republic of Ireland) J Cluskey	4	5
WC	(United States) M Fish (The Bahamas) M Knowles	6	7
Q	(Mexico) H Hach Verdugo (Mexico) L Patiño	7	7^{8}
(United States) C Buchanan (United States) R Williams	5	6^{6}
4	(United States) J Jung (United States) E King	4	4
(United Kingdom) L Broady (United States) D Novikov	6	6
(Romania) V Hănescu (United States) R Ram
(Argentina) G Andreozzi (Argentina) M Trungelliti	w/o
WC	(Latvia) Artūrs Kazijevs (Estonia) Markus Kerner	4	7	[7]
(Ukraine) D Molchanov (Russia) A Rublev	6	5	[10]
(United States) S Bangoura (Barbados) D King	6^{1}	6	[10]
3	(Venezuela) LD Martínez (Colombia) E Struvay	7^{7}	3	[6]
(United States) N Meister (United States) D Nguyen	2	3
(Bulgaria) D Kutrovsky (South Africa) D O'Brien	6	6
WC	(United States) Greg Ouellette (United States) Connor Smith	6^{2}	4
2	(Philippines) R Gonzales (United Kingdom) D Walsh	7^{7}	6

Quarterfinals
WC	(United States) M Fish (The Bahamas) M Knowles	3	5
Q	(Mexico) H Hach Verdugo (Mexico) L Patiño	6	7
(United Kingdom) L Broady (United States) D Novikov	w/o
(Argentina) G Andreozzi (Argentina) M Trungelliti
(Ukraine) D Molchanov (Russia) A Rublev	6	6
(United States) S Bangoura (Barbados) D King	0	3
(Bulgaria) D Kutrovsky (South Africa) D O'Brien	3	4
2	(Philippines) R Gonzales (United Kingdom) D Walsh	6	6

Semifinals
Q	(Mexico) H Hach Verdugo (Mexico) L Patiño	7^{7}	6
(United Kingdom) L Broady (United States) D Novikov	6^{6}	4
(Ukraine) D Molchanov (Russia) A Rublev	7^{7}	6
2	(Philippines) R Gonzales (United Kingdom) D Walsh	6^{4}	1

Final
Q	(Mexico) H Hach Verdugo (Mexico) L Patiño	4	6^{5}
(Ukraine) D Molchanov (Russia) A Rublev	6	7^{7}
