= 2011 Challenger of Dallas =

Men's tennis tournament

- Date: February 28 – March 6, 2011
- Edition: 13th
- Location: Dallas, United States

Champions

Singles
- (United States) Alex Bogomolov Jr.

Doubles
- (United States) Scott Lipsky / (United States) Rajeev Ram
- Challenger of Dallas

The 2011 Challenger of Dallas was a professional tennis tournament played on indoor hard courts. It was a Challenger of Dallas competition that forms part of the 2011 ATP Challenger Tour. It took place in Dallas, United States, between 28 February and 6 March 2011.

The defending champions in the singles tournament was Ryan Sweeting from the US, while the doubles champions, also from the US, were Scott Lipsky and David Martin.

== ATP entrants ==
=== Seeds ===
Country	Player	Rank	Seed
USA	Robert Kendrick	83	1
USA	Michael Russell	90	2
GER	Björn Phau	92	3
GER	Rainer Schüttler	95	4
GER	Dustin Brown	103	5
USA	Ryan Sweeting	118	6
TUR	Marsel İlhan	122	7
AUS	Marinko Matosevic	135	8

- Rankings are as of February 21, 2011.

=== Other entrants ===
The following players received wildcards into the singles main draw:

- (United States) Denis Kudla
- (United States) Jack Sock
- (Australia) Bernard Tomic
- (United States) Michael Yani

The following players received entry from the qualifying draw:

- (United States) Alexander Domijan
- (Romania) Andrei Dăescu
- (United States) Jarmere Jenkins
- (United States) Phillip Simmonds

== Champions ==
=== Singles ===
(United States) Alex Bogomolov Jr. def. (Germany) Rainer Schüttler, 7–6^{(7–5)}, 6–3

=== Doubles ===
(United States) Scott Lipsky / (United States) Rajeev Ram def. (Germany) Dustin Brown / (Germany) Björn Phau, 7–6^{(7–3)}, 6–4
