= 2014 Challenger of Dallas =

Tennis tournament

- Date: 3–9 February 2014
- Edition: 17th
- Draw: 32S / 16D
- Prize money: $100,000
- Surface: Hard (indoor)
- Location: Dallas, United States

Champions

Singles
- (United States) Steve Johnson

Doubles
- (Australia) Samuel Groth / (Australia) Chris Guccione
- Challenger of Dallas

The 2014 Challenger of Dallas was a professional tennis tournament played on indoor hard courts. It was the 17th edition of the tournament which was part of the 2014 ATP Challenger Tour. It took place in Dallas, United States between 3 and 9 February 2014.

== Singles main-draw entrants ==
=== Seeds ===
Country	Player	Rank^{1}	Seed
USA	Michael Russell	97	1
RUS	Alex Bogomolov Jr.	98	2
USA	Tim Smyczek	100	3
USA	Denis Kudla	109	4
CAN	Frank Dancevic	119	5
USA	Ryan Harrison	121	6
USA	Rhyne Williams	124	7
USA	Alex Kuznetsov	130	8

- ^{1} Rankings are as of January 27, 2014.

=== Other entrants ===
The following players received wildcards into the singles main draw:

- (South Africa) Jean Andersen
- (United States) Jared Donaldson
- (United States) John Mee
- (United States) Clay Thompson

The following players got into the singles main draw as a special exempt:

- (United States) Daniel Kosakowski

The following players got into the singles main draw as an alternate:

- (United States) Chase Buchanan

The following players received entry from the qualifying draw:

- (United States) Dennis Nevolo
- (United States) Evan King
- (United States) Justin S. Shane
- (United States) Nicolas Meister

== Champions ==
=== Singles ===
- (United States) Steve Johnson def. (Tunisia) Malek Jaziri, 6–4, 6–4

=== Doubles ===
- (Australia) Samuel Groth / (Australia) Chris Guccione def. (United States) Ryan Harrison / (The Bahamas) Mark Knowles, 6–4, 6–2
