= 2018 RBC Tennis Championships of Dallas =

- Date: 29 January – 4 February
- Edition: 21st
- Draw: 32S / 16D
- Surface: Hard (indoor)
- Location: Dallas, United States

Champions

Singles
- (Japan) Kei Nishikori

Doubles
- (India) Jeevan Nedunchezhiyan / (Indonesia) Christopher Rungkat
- RBC Tennis Championships of Dallas

The 2018 RBC Tennis Championships of Dallas was a professional tennis tournament played on hard courts. It was the 21st edition of the tournament and part of the 2018 ATP Challenger Tour. It took place in Dallas, United States between 29 January and 4 February 2018.

== Singles main-draw entrants ==
=== Seeds ===
Country	Player	Rank^{1}	Seed
JPN	Kei Nishikori	24	1
USA	Frances Tiafoe	81	2
USA	Taylor Fritz	91	3
USA	Bjorn Fratangelo	104	4
KAZ	Alexander Bublik	112	5
GER	Yannick Hanfmann	115	6
USA	Tim Smyczek	131	7
USA	Tommy Paul	150	8

- ^{1} Rankings are as of January 15, 2018.

=== Other entrants ===
The following players received wildcards into the singles main draw:

- (United States) Patrick Kypson
- (Japan) Kei Nishikori
- (United States) Frances Tiafoe

The following players received entry from the qualifying draw:

- (Spain) Íñigo Cervantes
- (United States) Jared Hiltzik
- (Russia) Evgeny Karlovskiy
- (Czech Republic) Jan Šátral

The following players received entry as lucky losers:

- (Italy) Francesco Ferrari
- (Germany) Dominik Köpfer

== Champions ==
=== Singles ===
- (Japan) Kei Nishikori def. (United States) Mackenzie McDonald 6–1, 6–4.

=== Doubles ===
- (India) Jeevan Nedunchezhiyan / (Indonesia) Christopher Rungkat def. (India) Leander Paes / (United Kingdom) Joe Salisbury 6–4, 3–6, [10–7].
