= 2017 RBC Tennis Championships of Dallas – Doubles =

Doubles
- 2017 RBC Tennis Championships of Dallas

Final
- Champions: (Republic of Ireland) David O'Hare (United Kingdom) Joe Salisbury
- Runners-up: (India) Jeevan Nedunchezhiyan (Indonesia) Christopher Rungkat
- Score: 6–7^{(6–8)}, 6–3, [11–9]

Events
Singles	Doubles
- RBC Tennis Championships of Dallas

Nicolas Meister and Eric Quigley were the defending champions but chose not to defend their title.

David O'Hare and Joe Salisbury won the title after defeating Jeevan Nedunchezhiyan and Christopher Rungkat 6–7^{(6–8)}, 6–3, [11–9] in the final.

== Seeds ==
1. (Chile) Julio Peralta / (United States) Rajeev Ram (first round)
2. (United States) Brian Baker / (United States) Nicholas Monroe (semifinals)
3. (Germany) Andre Begemann / (United States) Scott Lipsky (first round)
4. (China) Gong Maoxin / (China) Zhang Ze (first round)

== Draw ==
Key

- Q = Qualifier
- WC = Wild card
- LL = Lucky loser
- Alt = Alternate
- ITF = ITF entry
- PR = Protected ranking
- SR = Special ranking
- SE = Special exempt
- JE = Junior exempt
- JR = Junior Accelerator Programme entrant
- CO = College Accelerator Programme entrant
- NG = Next Gen Accelerator Program entrant
- w/o = Walkover
- r = Retired
- d = Defaulted

First round
1	(Chile) J Peralta (United States) R Ram	3	4
(India) J Nedunchezhiyan (Indonesia) C Rungkat	6	6
WC	(United States) M McDonald (United States) M Schnur	6	6
(United States) D Kudla (Republic of Ireland) J McGee	4	4
3	(Germany) A Begemann (United States) S Lipsky	2	5
(Ukraine) D Molchanov (United States) D Novikov	6	7
WC	(United States) A Krajicek (United States) J Withrow	6	7^{7}
(Argentina) M Trungelliti (Sweden) E Ymer	3	6^{3}
(Mexico) H Hach Verdugo (Japan) T Ito	3	4
(United States) R Harrison (United States) F Tiafoe	6	6
Q	(Republic of Ireland) D O'Hare (United Kingdom) J Salisbury	6	6
4	(China) M Gong (China) Z Zhang	4	4
(United Kingdom) L Bambridge (United States) S Bangoura	7^{7}	7^{7}
WC	(United States) Ian Dempster (United States) Shane Vinsant	6^{0}	6^{5}
(Belgium) K Coppejans (Kazakhstan) M Kukushkin	6	2	[3]
2	(United States) B Baker (United States) N Monroe	2	6	[10]

Quarterfinals
(India) J Nedunchezhiyan (Indonesia) C Rungkat	6	6
WC	(United States) M McDonald (United States) M Schnur	1	4
(Ukraine) D Molchanov (United States) D Novikov	6	7^{7}
WC	(United States) A Krajicek (United States) J Withrow	4	6^{1}
(United States) R Harrison (United States) F Tiafoe
Q	(Republic of Ireland) D O'Hare (United Kingdom) J Salisbury	w/o
(United Kingdom) L Bambridge (United States) S Bangoura	3	2
2	(United States) B Baker (United States) N Monroe	6	6

Semifinals
(India) J Nedunchezhiyan (Indonesia) C Rungkat	2	6	[10]
(Ukraine) D Molchanov (United States) D Novikov	6	4	[7]
Q	(Republic of Ireland) D O'Hare (United Kingdom) J Salisbury	3	7	[10]
2	(United States) B Baker (United States) N Monroe	6	5	[6]

Final
(India) J Nedunchezhiyan (Indonesia) C Rungkat	7^{8}	3	[9]
Q	(Republic of Ireland) D O'Hare (United Kingdom) J Salisbury	6^{6}	6	[11]
