= 2019 RBC Tennis Championships of Dallas =

- Date: 4–10 February
- Edition: 22nd
- Draw: 48S / 16D
- Surface: Hard (indoor)
- Location: Dallas, United States

Champions

Singles
- (United States) Mitchell Krueger

Doubles
- (United States) Marcos Giron / (United States) Dennis Novikov
- RBC Tennis Championships of Dallas

The 2019 RBC Tennis Championships of Dallas was a professional tennis tournament played on hard courts. It was the 22nd edition of the tournament and part of the 2019 ATP Challenger Tour. It took place in Dallas, United States between 4 and 10 February 2019.

== Singles main-draw entrants ==
=== Seeds ===
| Country | Player | Rank^{1} | Seed |
|---|---|---|---|
| USA | Mackenzie McDonald | 82 | 1 |
| ~~USA~~ | ~~Ryan Harrison~~ | ~~93~~ | ~~2~~ |
| USA | Reilly Opelka | 98 | 3 |
| TPE | Jason Jung | 115 | 4 |
| SRB | Miomir Kecmanović | 118 | 5 |
| USA | Bjorn Fratangelo | 131 | 6 |
| ~~USA~~ | ~~Noah Rubin~~ | ~~150~~ | ~~7~~ |
| USA | Christopher Eubanks | 157 | 8 |
| GER | Dominik Köpfer | 160 | 9 |
| CAN | Brayden Schnur | 164 | 10 |
| ECU | Roberto Quiroz | 178 | 11 |
| USA | Tim Smyczek | 187 | 12 |
| USA | Ernesto Escobedo | 206 | 13 |
| USA | Mitchell Krueger | 209 | 14 |
| BRA | Thomaz Bellucci | 223 | 15 |
| GER | Dustin Brown | 233 | 16 |

- ^{1} Rankings are as of January 28, 2019.

=== Other entrants ===
The following players received wildcards into the singles main draw:

- (United States) Harrison Adams
- (United States) William Blumberg
- (United States) Evan King
- (United States) Alex Rybakov
- (United States) Evan Zhu

The following players received entry into the singles main draw using their ITF World Tennis Ranking:

- (Argentina) Matías Franco Descotte
- (Netherlands) Jelle Sels
- (Brazil) João Souza
- (Germany) Louis Wessels

The following players received entry from the qualifying draw:

- (Netherlands) Gijs Brouwer
- (United States) Maxime Cressy

The following players received entry as lucky losers:

- (Ecuador) Emilio Gómez
- (United States) Martin Redlicki

== Champions ==
=== Singles ===
- (United States) Mitchell Krueger def. (United States) Mackenzie McDonald 4–6, 7–6^{(7–3)}, 6–1.

=== Doubles ===
- (United States) Marcos Giron / (United States) Dennis Novikov def. (Croatia) Ante Pavić / (South Africa) Ruan Roelofse 6–4, 7–6^{(7–3)}.
