= 2015 RBC Tennis Championships of Dallas – Singles =

Singles
- 2015 RBC Tennis Championships of Dallas

Final
- Champion: (United States) Tim Smyczek
- Runner-up: (United States) Rajeev Ram
- Score: 6–2, 4–1, ret.

Events
Singles	Doubles
- RBC Tennis Championships of Dallas

Steve Johnson was the defending champion but did not participate.

Tim Smyczek won the title when Rajeev Ram retired in the final.

== Seeds ==
1. (Kazakhstan) Mikhail Kukushkin (first round)
2. (Russia) Teymuraz Gabashvili (semifinals)
3. (Slovenia) Blaž Rola (first round)
4. (United States) Tim Smyczek (champion)
5. (United States) Denis Kudla (second round)
6. (Romania) Victor Hănescu (second round)
7. (United States) Rajeev Ram (final, retired)
8. (Portugal) Gastão Elias (first round)

== Draw ==
Key

- Q = Qualifier
- WC = Wild card
- LL = Lucky loser
- Alt = Alternate
- ITF = ITF entry
- PR = Protected ranking
- SR = Special ranking
- SE = Special exempt
- JE = Junior exempt
- JR = Junior Accelerator Programme entrant
- CO = College Accelerator Programme entrant
- NG = Next Gen Accelerator Program entrant
- w/o = Walkover
- r = Retired
- d = Defaulted

=== Finals ===
Semifinals
(Argentina) Marco Trungelliti	6^{5}	2
4	(United States) Tim Smyczek	7^{7}	6
7	(United States) Rajeev Ram	5	6	6
2	(Russia) Teymuraz Gabashvili	7	4	3

Final
4	(United States) Tim Smyczek	6	4
7	(United States) Rajeev Ram	2	1^{r}

=== Top half ===
First round
1	(Kazakhstan) M Kukushkin	2	6	3
(United States) A Kuznetsov	6	4	6
WC	(United States) Connor Smith	7^{7}	1	3
(United States) C Buchanan	6^{5}	6	6
SE	(United States) N Meister	3	5
(Argentina) M Trungelliti	6	7
Q	(France) Maxime Tchoutakian	6	6
8	(Portugal) G Elias	4	3
4	(United States) T Smyczek	3	6	7
(Republic of Ireland) J McGee	6	4	5
(United States) R Williams	6^{5}	2
(United States) R Harrison	7^{7}	6
(Australia) J-P Smith	6	6
(Colombia) E Struvay	3	2
(United Kingdom) L Broady	2	3
5	(United States) D Kudla	6	6

Second round
(United States) A Kuznetsov	6	3	7^{7}
(United States) C Buchanan	3	6	6^{0}
(Argentina) M Trungelliti	7^{7}	6
Q	(France) M Tchoutakian	6^{4}	4
4	(United States) T Smyczek	6	3	6
(United States) R Harrison	2	6	1
(Australia) J-P Smith	6	6
5	(United States) D Kudla	1	4

Quarterfinals
(United States) A Kuznetsov	6	3	4
(Argentina) M Trungelliti	1	6	6
4	(United States) T Smyczek	6	7^{7}
(Australia) J-P Smith	4	6^{4}

Semifinals
(Argentina) M Trungelliti	6^{5}	2
4	(United States) T Smyczek	7^{7}	6

=== Bottom half ===
First round
7	(United States) R Ram	6	6
WC	(United States) T-S Kwiatkowski	4	3
Q	(United Kingdom) C Norrie	2	6^{3}
WC	(United States) E Quigley	6	7^{7}
Alt	(Argentina) A Velotti	5	6	6
(Ukraine) D Molchanov	7	2	3
Q	(Russia) A Rublev	2	7^{7}	6
3	(Slovenia) B Rola	6	6^{5}	4
6	(Romania) V Hănescu	7^{11}	7
(United States) D Novikov	6^{9}	5
WC	(United States) R Sweeting	0	2
(Argentina) G Andreozzi	6	6
Q	(Bulgaria) D Kutrovsky	6	1	4
Alt	(United States) J Jung	4	6	6
(United States) D Nguyen	4	3
2	(Russia) T Gabashvili	6	6

Second round
7	(United States) R Ram	6	6
WC	(United States) E Quigley	2	4
Alt	(Argentina) A Velotti	2	3
Q	(Russia) A Rublev	6	6
6	(Romania) V Hănescu	6^{7}	4
(Argentina) G Andreozzi	7^{9}	6
Alt	(United States) J Jung	4	3
2	(Russia) T Gabashvili	6	6

Quarterfinals
7	(United States) R Ram	3	6	7
Q	(Russia) A Rublev	6	2	5
(Argentina) G Andreozzi	4	1
2	(Russia) T Gabashvili	6	6

Semifinals
7	(United States) R Ram	5	6	6
2	(Russia) T Gabashvili	7	4	3
