= 2016 RBC Tennis Championships of Dallas – Singles =

Singles
- 2016 RBC Tennis Championships of Dallas

Final
- Champion: (United Kingdom) Kyle Edmund
- Runner-up: (United Kingdom) Daniel Evans
- Score: 6–3 , 6–2

Events
Singles	Doubles
- RBC Tennis Championships of Dallas

Tim Smyczek was the defending champion, but lost in the semifinals to Kyle Edmund.

Kyle Edmund went on to win the title, defeating Daniel Evans in the final 6–3, 6–2.

== Seeds ==
1. (Australia) Sam Groth (first round)
2. (United Kingdom) Kyle Edmund (champion)
3. (Germany) Benjamin Becker (quarterfinals)
4. (United States) Tim Smyczek (semifinals)
5. (Moldova) Radu Albot (first round)
6. (Japan) Tatsuma Ito (semifinals)
7. (Australia) John-Patrick Smith (second round)
8. (United States) Bjorn Fratangelo (second round)

== Draw ==
Key

- Q = Qualifier
- WC = Wild card
- LL = Lucky loser
- Alt = Alternate
- ITF = ITF entry
- PR = Protected ranking
- SR = Special ranking
- SE = Special exempt
- JE = Junior exempt
- JR = Junior Accelerator Programme entrant
- CO = College Accelerator Programme entrant
- NG = Next Gen Accelerator Program entrant
- w/o = Walkover
- r = Retired
- d = Defaulted

=== Finals ===
Semifinals
6	(Japan) Tatsuma Ito	2	6	1
(United Kingdom) Daniel Evans	6	4	6
4	(United States) Tim Smyczek	5	3
2	(United Kingdom) Kyle Edmund	7	6

Final
(United Kingdom) Daniel Evans	3	2
2	(United Kingdom) Kyle Edmund	6	6

=== Top half ===
First round
1	(Australia) S Groth	3	3
(United States) F Tiafoe	6	6
Q	(Russia) Mikhail Vaks	6	6
(United States) Connor Smith	4	2
(Switzerland) H Laaksonen	7	6
Alt	(Czech Republic) M Michalička	5	1
(Ukraine) D Molchanov	2	7^{7}	6^{6}
6	(Japan) T Ito	6	6^{5}	7^{8}
3	(Germany) B Becker	6	6
WC	(South Africa) J Andersen	4	3
Q	(United States) C Thompson	3	6^{6}
WC	(United States) E Escobedo	6	7^{8}
(Russia) A Rublev	7	4	3
(United Kingdom) D Evans	5	6	6
(United States) J Donaldson	3	4
8	(United States) B Fratangelo	6	6

Second round
(United States) F Tiafoe	6	6
Q	(Russia) M Vaks	4	4
(Switzerland) H Laaksonen	2	6^{5}
6	(Japan) T Ito	6	7^{7}
3	(Germany) B Becker	6	6
WC	(United States) E Escobedo	4	2
(United Kingdom) D Evans	6	6
8	(United States) B Fratangelo	2	3

Quarterfinals
(United States) F Tiafoe	6	5	4
6	(Japan) T Ito	3	7	6
3	(Germany) B Becker	1	4
(United Kingdom) D Evans	6	6

Semifinals
6	(Japan) T Ito	2	6	1
(United Kingdom) D Evans	6	4	6

=== Bottom half ===
First round
5	(Moldova) R Albot	4	6	4
Q	(Australia) M Matosevic	6	4	6
LL	(Colombia) N Barrientos	3	6^{6}
(Argentina) M Trungelliti	6	7^{8}
WC	(United States) A Kuznetsov	6	5	5
(United States) R Harrison	2	7	7
Alt	(United States) M Krueger	4	3
4	(United States) T Smyczek	6	6
7	(Australia) J-P Smith	7^{8}	6
Q	(United States) E Quigley	6^{6}	3
(Slovenia) G Žemlja	6	4	7^{7}
(Chinese Taipei) J Jung	4	6	6^{5}
(Republic of Ireland) J McGee	5	6	6
(United States) D Novikov	7	1	4
WC	(United States) S Bangoura	6^{4}	2
2	(United Kingdom) K Edmund	7^{7}	6

Second round
Q	(Australia) M Matosevic	6	6
(Argentina) M Trungelliti	4	3
(United States) R Harrison	0	7	4
4	(United States) T Smyczek	6	5	6
7	(Australia) J-P Smith	6	3	4
(Slovenia) G Žemlja	4	6	6
(Republic of Ireland) J McGee	3	4
2	(United Kingdom) K Edmund	6	6

Quarterfinals
Q	(Australia) M Matosevic	6^{4}	6	3
4	(United States) T Smyczek	7^{7}	4	6
(Slovenia) G Žemlja	5	1
2	(United Kingdom) K Edmund	7	6

Semifinals
4	(United States) T Smyczek	5	3
2	(United Kingdom) K Edmund	7	6
