= 2016 RBC Tennis Championships of Dallas – Doubles =

Doubles
- 2016 RBC Tennis Championships of Dallas

Final
- Champions: (United States) Nicolas Meister (United States) Eric Quigley
- Runners-up: (United States) Sekou Bangoura (South Africa) Dean O'Brien
- Score: 6–1, 6–1

Events
Singles	Doubles
- RBC Tennis Championships of Dallas

Denys Molchanov and Andrey Rublev were the defending champions, but they chose to compete with different partners.

Molchanov competed alongside Radu Albot while Rublev played with Frances Tiafoe. Molchanov and Albot lost in the quarterfinals to Nicolas Meister and Eric Quigley while Rublev and Tiafoe lost in the first round to Hans Hach Verdugo and Dennis Novikov.

Nicolas Meister and Eric Quigley went on to win the title, defeating Sekou Bangoura and Dean O'Brien in the final 6–1, 6–1.

== Seeds ==
1. (Moldova) Radu Albot / (Ukraine) Denys Molchanov (quarterfinals)
2. (United States) Sekou Bangoura / (South Africa) Dean O'Brien (final)
3. (Colombia) Nicolás Barrientos / (Uruguay) Ariel Behar (semifinals)
4. (Mexico) Hans Hach Verdugo / (United States) Dennis Novikov (semifinals)

== Draw ==
Key

- Q = Qualifier
- WC = Wild card
- LL = Lucky loser
- Alt = Alternate
- ITF = ITF entry
- PR = Protected ranking
- SR = Special ranking
- SE = Special exempt
- JE = Junior exempt
- JR = Junior Accelerator Programme entrant
- CO = College Accelerator Programme entrant
- NG = Next Gen Accelerator Program entrant
- w/o = Walkover
- r = Retired
- d = Defaulted

First round
1	(Moldova) R Albot (Ukraine) D Molchanov	6	5	[10]
(United States) J Cerretani (United States) M Schnur	3	7	[8]
Q	(United States) Dennis Nevolo (Mexico) L Patiño	4	3
WC	(United States) N Meister (United States) E Quigley	6	6
4	(Mexico) H Hach Verdugo (United States) D Novikov	6	4	[10]
(Russia) A Rublev (United States) F Tiafoe	4	6	[1]
(El Salvador) M Arévalo (Czech Republic) M Michalička	6	7
(United States) J Donaldson (Argentina) Maximiliano Estevez	3	5
(United States) A Kuznetsov (Germany) F Moser	4	6	[7]
(United States) M Krueger (Switzerland) H Laaksonen	6	2	[10]
(Philippines) R Gonzales (United Kingdom) D Walsh	4	6	[11]
3	(Colombia) N Barrientos (Uruguay) A Behar	6	3	[13]
WC	(United States) H Johnson (United States) Y Johnson	3	4
(United States) B Fratangelo (United States) Connor Smith	6	6
(United States) N Chappell (United States) Dane Webb	6	4	[5]
2	(United States) S Bangoura (South Africa) D O'Brien	4	6	[10]

Quarterfinals
1	(Moldova) R Albot (Ukraine) D Molchanov	3	6	[5]
WC	(United States) N Meister (United States) E Quigley	6	1	[10]
4	(Mexico) H Hach Verdugo (United States) D Novikov	6	6
(El Salvador) M Arévalo (Czech Republic) M Michalička	3	3
(United States) M Krueger (Switzerland) H Laaksonen	2	4
3	(Colombia) N Barrientos (Uruguay) A Behar	6	6
(United States) B Fratangelo (United States) C Smith	4	6	[7]
2	(United States) S Bangoura (South Africa) D O'Brien	6	4	[10]

Semifinals
WC	(United States) N Meister (United States) E Quigley	6	6
4	(Mexico) H Hach Verdugo (United States) D Novikov	3	4
3	(Colombia) N Barrientos (Uruguay) A Behar	3	4
2	(United States) S Bangoura (South Africa) D O'Brien	6	6

Final
WC	(United States) N Meister (United States) E Quigley	6	6
2	(United States) S Bangoura (South Africa) D O'Brien	1	1
