= 2015 Levene Gouldin & Thompson Tennis Challenger – Singles =

Singles
- 2015 Levene Gouldin & Thompson Tennis Challenger

Final
- Champion: (United Kingdom) Kyle Edmund
- Runner-up: (United States) Bjorn Fratangelo
- Score: 6–2, 6–3

Events
Singles	Doubles
- Levene Gouldin & Thompson Tennis Challenger

Sergiy Stakhovsky was the defending champion but chose not to compete.

Kyle Edmund won the title defeating Bjorn Fratangelo, 6–2, 6–3 in the final.

== Seeds ==
1. (United Kingdom) Kyle Edmund (champion)
2. (United States) Bjorn Fratangelo (final)
3. (United Kingdom) Liam Broady (first round)
4. (Brazil) Guilherme Clezar (first round)
5. (United States) Jared Donaldson (second round)
6. (United Kingdom) Brydan Klein (semifinals)
7. (United States) Daniel Nguyen (first round)
8. (India) Saketh Myneni (first round)

== Draw ==
Key

- Q = Qualifier
- WC = Wild card
- LL = Lucky loser
- Alt = Alternate
- ITF = ITF entry
- PR = Protected ranking
- SR = Special ranking
- SE = Special exempt
- JE = Junior exempt
- JR = Junior Accelerator Programme entrant
- CO = College Accelerator Programme entrant
- NG = Next Gen Accelerator Program entrant
- w/o = Walkover
- r = Retired
- d = Defaulted

=== Finals ===
Semifinals
1/WC	(United Kingdom) Kyle Edmund	6	7^{7}
Q	(United States) Sekou Bangoura	3	6^{4}
6	(United Kingdom) Brydan Klein	4	2
2	(United States) Bjorn Fratangelo	6	6

Final
1/WC	(United Kingdom) Kyle Edmund	6	6
2	(United States) Bjorn Fratangelo	2	3

=== Top half ===
First round
1/WC	(United Kingdom) K Edmund	7	6^{4}	6
Q	(United States) E Escobedo	5	7^{7}	1
(Australia) O Jasika	3	3
WC	(United States) N Rubin	6	6
(Ecuador) G Escobar	3	5
WC	(United States) T Paul	6	7
(United States) M Krueger	6	6
8	(India) S Myneni	4	3
4	(Brazil) G Clezar	1	3
(United States) A Kuznetsov	6	6
(Chinese Taipei) J Jung	6	3	6^{8}
(United States) D Novikov	4	6	7^{10}
Q	(United States) S Bangoura	4	6	6
WC	(United States) R Opelka	6	3	4
(Japan) T Niki	3	2
5	(United States) J Donaldson	6	6

Second round
1/WC	(United Kingdom) K Edmund	7	6^{3}	6
WC	(United States) N Rubin	5	7^{7}	4
WC	(United States) T Paul	5	4
(United States) M Krueger	7	6
(United States) A Kuznetsov	4	5
(United States) D Novikov	6	7
Q	(United States) S Bangoura	6	6
5	(United States) J Donaldson	4	2

Quarterfinals
1/WC	(United Kingdom) K Edmund	6	6
(United States) M Krueger	3	2
(United States) D Novikov	6	3	6^{9}
Q	(United States) S Bangoura	3	6	7^{11}

Semifinals
1/WC	(United Kingdom) K Edmund	6	7^{7}
Q	(United States) S Bangoura	3	6^{4}

=== Bottom half ===
First round
6	(United Kingdom) B Klein	2	7^{9}	6
Q	(United States) M Giron	6	6^{7}	4
PR	(United States) R Sweeting	5	2
(United Kingdom) E Corrie	7	6
(Croatia) M Pecotić	7^{7}	6
(Croatia) A Pavić	6^{5}	4
(Denmark) F Nielsen	6	4	6
3	(United Kingdom) L Broady	1	6	2
7	(United States) D Nguyen	1	1
(Bulgaria) D Kutrovsky	6	6
Q	(United States) N Meister	6	7^{8}
(Chile) N Jarry	1	6^{6}
(United States) F Tiafoe	6	7^{7}
(France) G Barrère	4	6^{1}
PR	(Australia) G Jones	5	6	2
2	(United States) B Fratangelo	7	2	6

Second round
6	(United Kingdom) B Klein	6	6
(United Kingdom) E Corrie	3	2
(Croatia) M Pecotić	5	4
(Denmark) F Nielsen	7	6
(Bulgaria) D Kutrovsky	6^{6}	6	6^{3}
Q	(United States) N Meister	7^{8}	3	7^{7}
(United States) F Tiafoe	6	3	4
2	(United States) B Fratangelo	4	6	6

Quarterfinals
6	(United Kingdom) B Klein	2	6	6
(Denmark) F Nielsen	6	3	4
Q	(United States) N Meister	1	6	5
2	(United States) B Fratangelo	6	4	7

Semifinals
6	(United Kingdom) B Klein	4	2
2	(United States) B Fratangelo	6	6
