= 2015 Levene Gouldin & Thompson Tennis Challenger – Doubles =

Doubles
- 2015 Levene Gouldin & Thompson Tennis Challenger

Final
- Champion: (South Africa) Dean O'Brien (South Africa) Ruan Roelofse
- Runner-up: (United States) Daniel Nguyen (United States) Dennis Novikov
- Score: 6–1, 7–6^{(7–0)}

Events
Singles	Doubles
- Levene Gouldin & Thompson Tennis Challenger

Daniel Cox and Daniel Smethurst are the defending champions, but chose not to participate this year.

Dean O'Brien and Ruan Roelofse won the title defeating Daniel Nguyen and Dennis Novikov in the final, 6–1, 7–6^{(7–0)}.

== Seeds ==
1. (South Africa) Dean O'Brien / (South Africa) Ruan Roelofse (champions)
2. (Australia) Carsten Ball / (United Kingdom) Brydan Klein (quarterfinals)
3. (United States) Sekou Bangoura / (Brazil) Guilherme Clezar (semifinals)
4. (United Kingdom) Luke Bambridge / (United Kingdom) Liam Broady (semifinals)

== Draw ==
Key

- Q = Qualifier
- WC = Wild card
- LL = Lucky loser
- Alt = Alternate
- ITF = ITF entry
- PR = Protected ranking
- SR = Special ranking
- SE = Special exempt
- JE = Junior exempt
- JR = Junior Accelerator Programme entrant
- CO = College Accelerator Programme entrant
- NG = Next Gen Accelerator Program entrant
- w/o = Walkover
- r = Retired
- d = Defaulted

=== Draw ===
First round
WC	(United States) Nicholas Bybel (Russia) Artem Khrapko	2	6	[6]
(Croatia) A Pavić (Croatia) M Pecotić	6	1	[10]
WC	(United States) George Barth (United States) Keith Whittingham	2	1
(France) G Barrère (France) Tom Jomby	6	6
WC	(United States) Patrick Daciek (United States) Austin Smith	3	4
(United States) B Fratangelo (Chile) N Jarry	6	6
(Chinese Taipei) J Jung (Japan) T Niki	3	6	[4]
(United States) D Nguyen (United States) D Novikov	6	4	[10]

Quarterfinals
1	(South Africa) D O'Brien (South Africa) R Roelofse	6	6
(Croatia) A Pavić (Croatia) M Pecotić	4	2
4	(United Kingdom) L Bambridge (United Kingdom) L Broady	6	6
(France) G Barrère (France) T Jomby	2	3
(United States) B Fratangelo (Chile) N Jarry	6	5	[5]
3	(United States) S Bangoura (Brazil) G Clezar	4	7	[10]
(United States) D Nguyen (United States) D Novikov	6	6
2	(Australia) C Ball (United Kingdom) B Klein	4	4

Semifinals
1	(South Africa) D O'Brien (South Africa) R Roelofse	6	7
4	(United Kingdom) L Bambridge (United Kingdom) L Broady	4	5
3	(United States) S Bangoura (Brazil) G Clezar	4	4
(United States) D Nguyen (United States) D Novikov	6	6

Final
1	(South Africa) D O'Brien (South Africa) R Roelofse	6	7^{7}
(United States) D Nguyen (United States) D Novikov	1	6^{0}
