= 2010 Challenger of Dallas – Singles =

Singles
- 2010 Challenger of Dallas

Final
- Champion: (United States) Ryan Sweeting
- Runner-up: (Australia) Carsten Ball
- Score: 6–4, 6–2

Events
Singles	Doubles
- Challenger of Dallas

Ryan Sweeting was the defending champion, and he won in the final 6–4, 6–2 against Carsten Ball.

== Seeds ==
1. (United States) Jesse Levine (first round)
2. (Australia) Carsten Ball (final)
3. (United States) Robert Kendrick (quarterfinals)
4. (South Africa) Kevin Anderson (first round)
5. (United States) Michael Yani (semifinals)
6. (United States) Jesse Witten (first round)
7. (United States) Ryan Sweeting (champion)
8. (Paraguay) Ramón Delgado (semifinals)

== Draw ==
Key

- Q = Qualifier
- WC = Wild card
- LL = Lucky loser
- Alt = Alternate
- ITF = ITF entry
- PR = Protected ranking
- SR = Special ranking
- SE = Special exempt
- JE = Junior exempt
- JR = Junior Accelerator Programme entrant
- CO = College Accelerator Programme entrant
- NG = Next Gen Accelerator Program entrant
- w/o = Walkover
- r = Retired
- d = Defaulted

=== Finals ===
Semifinals
7	(United States) Ryan Sweeting	6	6^{4}	6
8	(Paraguay) Ramón Delgado	4	7^{7}	4
5	(United States) Michael Yani	3	5
2	(Australia) Carsten Ball	6	7

Final
7	(United States) Ryan Sweeting	6	6
2	(Australia) Carsten Ball	4	2

=== Top half ===
First round
1	(United States) J Levine	6^{5}	7	4
(United States) A Bogomolov Jr.	7^{7}	5	6
WC	(United States) D Webb	1	2
(Germany) A Begemann	6	6
(Japan) G Soeda	6	6
(South Korea) KT Im	2	1
Q	(United States) N Monroe	1	4
7	(United States) R Sweeting	6	6
4	(South Africa) K Anderson	6	5	6^{3}
WC	(United States) B Reynolds	3	7	7^{7}
(United States) L Cook	6	2	4
(France) V Millot	4	6	6
(United States) A Kuznetsov	7	7^{7}
Q	(Slovenia) L Gregorc	5	6^{2}
(Lithuania) R Berankis	1	6	6^{5}
8	(Paraguay) R Delgado	6	3	7^{7}

Second round
(United States) A Bogomolov Jr.	6	6
(Germany) A Begemann	4	2
(Japan) G Soeda	2	2
7	(United States) R Sweeting	6	6
WC	(United States) B Reynolds	6	6
(France) V Millot	4	4
(United States) A Kuznetsov	6	3	3
8	(Paraguay) R Delgado	4	6	6

Quarterfinals
(United States) A Bogomolov Jr.	2	3
7	(United States) R Sweeting	6	6
WC	(United States) B Reynolds	3	2
8	(Paraguay) R Delgado	6	6

Semifinals
7	(United States) R Sweeting	6	6^{3}	6
8	(Paraguay) R Delgado	4	7^{7}	4

=== Bottom half ===
First round
5	(United States) M Yani	6	6
(Australia) M Philippoussis	4	4
WC	(United States) R Harrison	6	6
Q	(Finland) J Paukku	3	4
WC	(United States) M McClune	6	6
(United States) S Jenkins	3	3
Q	(France) J-N Insausti	3	4
3	(United States) R Kendrick	6	6
6	(United States) J Witten	6^{1}	3
(United States) R DeHeart	7^{7}	6
(Bulgaria) G Dimitrov	6	2	2
(Italy) M Crugnola	3	6	6
(Italy) A Stoppini	6	6
(Netherlands) I Sijsling	1	2
(Ecuador) G Lapentti	3	4
2	(Australia) C Ball	6	6

Second round
5	(United States) M Yani	7	6
WC	(United States) R Harrison	5	2
WC	(United States) M McClune	6	6^{1}	4
3	(United States) R Kendrick	3	7^{7}	6
(United States) R DeHeart	2	6	3
(Italy) M Crugnola	6	3	6
(Italy) A Stoppini	5	3
2	(Australia) C Ball	7	6

Quarterfinals
5	(United States) M Yani	3	7^{7}	7^{7}
3	(United States) R Kendrick	6	6^{5}	6^{4}
(Italy) M Crugnola	4	1
2	(Australia) C Ball	6	6

Semifinals
5	(United States) M Yani	3	5
2	(Australia) C Ball	6	7
