= 2015 Levene Gouldin & Thompson Tennis Challenger =

- Date: 20–26 July
- Edition: 22nd
- Surface: Hard court
- Location: Binghamton, United States

Champions

Singles
- (United Kingdom) Kyle Edmund

Doubles
- (South Africa) Dean O'Brien / (South Africa) Ruan Roelofse
- Levene Gouldin & Thompson Tennis Challenger

The 2015 Levene Gouldin & Thompson Tennis Challenger was a professional tennis tournament played on hard court. It was the 22nd edition of the tournament which was part of the 2015 ATP Challenger Tour. It takes place in Binghamton, United States between 20 and 26 July 2015.

== Singles main-draw entrants ==
=== Seeds ===
Country	Player	Rank^{1}	Seed
GBR	Kyle Edmund	113	1
USA	Bjorn Fratangelo	123	2
GBR	Liam Broady	159	3
BRA	Guilherme Clezar	160	4
USA	Jared Donaldson	166	5
GBR	Brydan Klein	175	6
USA	Daniel Nguyen	189	7
IND	Saketh Myneni	198	8

- ^{1} Rankings are as of July 13, 2015.

=== Other entrants ===
The following players received wildcards into the singles main draw:

- (United Kingdom) Kyle Edmund
- (United States) Reilly Opelka
- (United States) Tommy Paul
- (United States) Noah Rubin

The following players received entry into the singles main draw with a protected ranking:

- (United States) Ryan Sweeting
- (Australia) Greg Jones

The following players received entry from the qualifying draw:

- (United States) Sekou Bangoura
- (United States) Ernesto Escobedo
- (United States) Marcos Giron
- (United States) Nicolas Meister

== Champions ==
=== Men's singles ===
- (United Kingdom) Kyle Edmund def. (United States) Bjorn Fratangelo, 6–2, 6–3.

=== Men's doubles ===
- (South Africa) Dean O'Brien / (South Africa) Ruan Roelofse def. (United States) Daniel Nguyen / (United States) Dennis Novikov, 6–1, 7–6^{(7–0)}
