= 2018 RBC Tennis Championships of Dallas – Singles =

Singles
- 2018 RBC Tennis Championships of Dallas

Final
- Champion: (Japan) Kei Nishikori
- Runner-up: (United States) Mackenzie McDonald
- Score: 6–1, 6–4

Events
| Singles | Doubles |
- RBC Tennis Championships of Dallas

Ryan Harrison was the defending champion but chose not to defend his title.

Kei Nishikori won the title after defeating Mackenzie McDonald 6–1, 6–4 in the final.

== Seeds ==
1. (Japan) Kei Nishikori (champion)
2. (United States) Frances Tiafoe (second round)
3. (United States) Taylor Fritz (quarterfinals)
4. (United States) Bjorn Fratangelo (first round)
5. (Kazakhstan) Alexander Bublik (first round)
6. (Germany) Yannick Hanfmann (first round)
7. (United States) Tim Smyczek (quarterfinals)
8. (United States) Tommy Paul (second round)

== Draw ==
Key

- Q = Qualifier
- WC = Wild card
- LL = Lucky loser
- Alt = Alternate
- ITF = ITF entry
- PR = Protected ranking
- SR = Special ranking
- SE = Special exempt
- JE = Junior exempt
- JR = Junior Accelerator Programme entrant
- CO = College Accelerator Programme entrant
- NG = Next Gen Accelerator Program entrant
- w/o = Walkover
- r = Retired
- d = Defaulted

=== Finals ===
Semifinals
1/WC | (Japan) Kei Nishikori | 6 | 6
(Chinese Taipei) Jason Jung | 4 | 4
(United States) Denis Kudla | 4 | 4
(United States) Mackenzie McDonald | 6 | 6

Final
1/WC | (Japan) Kei Nishikori | 6 | 6
(United States) Mackenzie McDonald | 1 | 4

=== Top half ===
First round
1/WC | (Japan) K Nishikori | 6 | 6
(United States) D Novikov | 3 | 3
(Germany) M Bachinger | 2 | 6 | 6
Q | (Russia) E Karlovskiy | 6 | 3 | 4
LL | (Italy) Francesco Ferrari | 7^{8} | 2 | 2
LL | (Germany) D Köpfer | 6^{6} | 6 | 6
(Portugal) G Oliveira | 7^{7} | 7^{7}
6 | (Germany) Y Hanfmann | 6^{3} | 6^{5}
4 | (United States) B Fratangelo | 4 | 6 | 4
(Serbia) M Kecmanović | 6 | 3 | 6
(United States) A Krajicek | 6 | 6
(Canada) F Peliwo | 3 | 3
(Canada) B Schnur | 7 | 2 | 6^{7}
Q | (United States) Jared Hiltzik | 5 | 6 | 7^{9}
(Chinese Taipei) J Jung | 6 | 6
5 | (Kazakhstan) A Bublik | 4 | 4

Second round
1/WC | (Japan) K Nishikori | 4 | 6 | 6
(Germany) M Bachinger | 6 | 4 | 4
LL | (Germany) D Köpfer | 6 | 7
(Portugal) G Oliveira | 0 | 5
(Serbia) M Kecmanović | 7^{7} | 6^{5} | 7^{7}
(United States) A Krajicek | 6^{4} | 7^{7} | 6^{4}
Q | (United States) J Hiltzik | 6 | 1 | 4
(Chinese Taipei) J Jung | 4 | 6 | 6

Quarterfinals
1/WC | (Japan) K Nishikori | 7^{7} | 6
LL | (Germany) D Köpfer | 6^{3} | 3
(Serbia) M Kecmanović | 1 | 1
(Chinese Taipei) J Jung | 6 | 6

Semifinals
1/WC | (Japan) K Nishikori | 6 | 6
(Chinese Taipei) J Jung | 4 | 4

=== Bottom half ===
First round
8 | (United States) T Paul | 6 | 6
Q | (Czech Republic) J Šátral | 3 | 3
(United States) D Kudla | 6 | 6
WC | (United States) P Kypson | 3 | 1
(United States) B Klahn | 6 | 2 | 6
(United States) M Giron | 4 | 6 | 4
Q | (Spain) Í Cervantes | 2 | 7 | 1
3 | (United States) T Fritz | 6 | 5 | 6
7 | (United States) T Smyczek | 6 | 4 | 6
(United States) M Krueger | 1 | 6 | 3
(Croatia) A Pavić | 6 | 6^{6} | 6^{9}
(Argentina) A Collarini | 1 | 7^{8} | 7^{11}
(United States) M McDonald | 7 | 6
(Japan) T Ito | 5 | 3
(United States) S Kozlov | 2 | 6^{5}
2/WC | (United States) F Tiafoe | 6 | 7^{7}

Second round
8 | (United States) T Paul | 6^{6} | 4
(United States) D Kudla | 7^{8} | 6
(United States) B Klahn | 4 | 6 | 6^{2}
3 | (United States) T Fritz | 6 | 2 | 7^{7}
7 | (United States) T Smyczek | 6 | 6
(Argentina) A Collarini | 4 | 4
(United States) M McDonald | 7 | 2 | 6
2/WC | (United States) F Tiafoe | 5 | 6 | 3

Quarterfinals
(United States) D Kudla | 6 | 6
3 | (United States) T Fritz | 3 | 3
7 | (United States) T Smyczek | 4 | 2
(United States) M McDonald | 6 | 6

Semifinals
(United States) D Kudla | 4 | 4
(United States) M McDonald | 6 | 6
