= 2019 RBC Tennis Championships of Dallas – Doubles =

Doubles
- 2019 RBC Tennis Championships of Dallas

Final
- Champions: (United States) Marcos Giron (United States) Dennis Novikov
- Runners-up: (Croatia) Ante Pavić (South Africa) Ruan Roelofse
- Score: 6–4, 7–6^{(7–3)}

Events
Singles	Doubles
- RBC Tennis Championships of Dallas

Jeevan Nedunchezhiyan and Christopher Rungkat were the defending champions but chose not to defend their title.

Marcos Giron and Dennis Novikov won the title after defeating Ante Pavić and Ruan Roelofse 6–4, 7–6^{(7–3)} in the final.

== Seeds ==
1. (United States) Ryan Harrison / (United States) Jackson Withrow (first round, withdrew)
2. (Monaco) Romain Arneodo / (Belarus) Andrei Vasilevski (semifinals)
3. (Venezuela) Roberto Maytín / (Brazil) Fernando Romboli (quarterfinals)
4. (United States) Evan King / (United States) Hunter Reese (first round)

== Draw ==
Key

- Q = Qualifier
- WC = Wild card
- LL = Lucky loser
- Alt = Alternate
- ITF = ITF entry
- PR = Protected ranking
- SR = Special ranking
- SE = Special exempt
- JE = Junior exempt
- JR = Junior Accelerator Programme entrant
- CO = College Accelerator Programme entrant
- NG = Next Gen Accelerator Program entrant
- w/o = Walkover
- r = Retired
- d = Defaulted

First round
1	(United States) R Harrison (United States) J Withrow
WC	(United States) J Isner (United States) A Kuznetsov	w/o
ITF	(Argentina) MF Descotte (Brazil) J Souza
(Croatia) A Pavić (South Africa) R Roelofse	w/o
3	(Venezuela) R Maytín (Brazil) F Romboli	7^{7}	6
WC	(Bolivia) B Arias (United States) Ian Dempster	6^{3}	3
ITF	(United States) M Cressy (Portugal) B Saraiva
(Philippines) R Gonzales (United States) A Lawson	w/o
(Ecuador) G Escobar (United States) N Pasha	1	5
(India) S Balaji (Mexico) H Hach Verdugo	6	7
WC	(United States) M Giron (United States) D Novikov	3	6	[10]
4	(United States) E King (United States) H Reese	6	3	[8]
(Venezuela) LD Martínez (Italy) A Vavassori	3	7^{7}	[10]
(Germany) D Brown (Portugal) G Oliveira	6	6^{4}	[8]
(United States) M Krueger (Australia) N Kyrgios	7^{7}	6^{5}	[5]
2	(Monaco) R Arneodo (Belarus) A Vasilevski	6^{2}	7^{7}	[10]

Quarterfinals
WC	(United States) J Isner (United States) A Kuznetsov	6	5	[7]
(Croatia) A Pavić (South Africa) R Roelofse	1	7	[10]
3	(Venezuela) R Maytín (Brazil) F Romboli	5	4
(Philippines) R Gonzales (United States) A Lawson	7	6
(India) S Balaji (Mexico) H Hach Verdugo	4	6^{3}
WC	(United States) M Giron (United States) D Novikov	6	7^{7}
(Venezuela) LD Martínez (Italy) A Vavassori	2	2
2	(Monaco) R Arneodo (Belarus) A Vasilevski	6	6

Semifinals
(Croatia) A Pavić (South Africa) R Roelofse	6	5	[10]
(Philippines) R Gonzales (United States) A Lawson	4	7	[8]
WC	(United States) M Giron (United States) D Novikov	6^{4}	6	[11]
2	(Monaco) R Arneodo (Belarus) A Vasilevski	7^{7}	4	[9]

Final
(Croatia) A Pavić (South Africa) R Roelofse	4	6^{3}
WC	(United States) M Giron (United States) D Novikov	6	7^{7}
