= 2014 Challenger of Dallas – Doubles =

Doubles
- 2014 Challenger of Dallas

Final
- Champions: (Australia) Samuel Groth (Australia) Chris Guccione
- Runners-up: (United States) Ryan Harrison (The Bahamas) Mark Knowles
- Score: 6–4, 6–2

Events
Singles	Doubles
- Challenger of Dallas

Alex Kuznetsov and Mischa Zverev were the defending champions but lost to Alex Bogomolov Jr. and Jordan Kerr in the quarterfinals.
Top seeded Australians Samuel Groth and Chris Guccione won the title over wildcards Ryan Harrison and Mark Knowles.

== Seeds ==
1. (Australia) Samuel Groth / (Australia) Chris Guccione (champions)
2. (Italy) Riccardo Ghedin / (Italy) Alessandro Motti (first round)
3. (United States) Vahid Mirzadeh / (Canada) Peter Polansky (first round)
4. (United States) Rajeev Ram / (United States) Bobby Reynolds (first round)

== Draw ==
Key

- Q = Qualifier
- WC = Wild card
- LL = Lucky loser
- Alt = Alternate
- ITF = ITF entry
- PR = Protected ranking
- SR = Special ranking
- SE = Special exempt
- JE = Junior exempt
- JR = Junior Accelerator Programme entrant
- CO = College Accelerator Programme entrant
- NG = Next Gen Accelerator Program entrant
- w/o = Walkover
- r = Retired
- d = Defaulted

=== Draw ===
First round
1	(Australia) S Groth (Australia) C Guccione	6	6
WC	(United States) D Kosakowski (United States) N Meister	1	4
Q	(United States) A Halebian (United States) D Novikov	4	4
(United States) K King (Colombia) J-C Spir	6	6
3	(United States) V Mirzadeh (Canada) P Polansky	3	2
LL	(United States) J Jung (United States) E King	6	6
(Dominican Republic) V Estrella Burgos (Dominican Republic) J Hernández	3	7	[9]
PR	(United States) Alham El Effendi (United Kingdom) D Walsh	6	5	[11]
(Republic of Ireland) J McGee (United States) M Russell	6^{2}	2
(Russia) A Bogomolov Jr. (Australia) J Kerr	7^{7}	6
(United States) A Kuznetsov (Germany) M Zverev	6	6
4	(United States) R Ram (United States) B Reynolds	4	4
WC	(United States) R Harrison (The Bahamas) M Knowles	7^{7}	6
(United States) C Buchanan (Germany) T Puetz	6^{2}	0
WC	(United States) Neil Kenner (United States) Andrew McCarthy	6	6
2	(Italy) R Ghedin (Italy) A Motti	1	2

Quarterfinals
1	(Australia) S Groth (Australia) C Guccione	6	7^{7}
(United States) K King (Colombia) J-C Spir	4	6^{4}
LL	(United States) J Jung (United States) E King	6	3	[10]
PR	(United States) A El Effendi (United Kingdom) D Walsh	4	6	[6]
(Russia) A Bogomolov Jr. (Australia) J Kerr	6	7
(United States) A Kuznetsov (Germany) M Zverev	2	5
WC	(United States) R Harrison (The Bahamas) M Knowles	7	6
WC	(United States) N Kenner (United States) A McCarthy	5	1

Semifinals
1	(Australia) S Groth (Australia) C Guccione	6	7
LL	(United States) J Jung (United States) E King	2	5
(Russia) A Bogomolov Jr. (Australia) J Kerr	4	6	[9]
WC	(United States) R Harrison (The Bahamas) M Knowles	6	4	[11]

Final
1	(Australia) S Groth (Australia) C Guccione	6	6
WC	(United States) R Harrison (The Bahamas) M Knowles	4	2
