= 2011 Challenger of Dallas – Singles =

Singles
- 2011 Challenger of Dallas

Final
- Champion: (United States) Alex Bogomolov Jr.
- Runner-up: (Germany) Rainer Schüttler
- Score: 7–6^{(7–5)}, 6–3

Events
Singles	Doubles
- Challenger of Dallas

The 2011 Challenger of Dallas was a professional tennis tournament played on indoor hard courts. It was a Challenger of Dallas competition that forms part of the 2011 ATP Challenger Tour. It took place in Dallas, United States, between 28 February and 6 March 2011.

Ryan Sweeting was the defending champion, but withdrew from the tournament.
Alex Bogomolov Jr. won the tournament after defeating Rainer Schüttler 7–6^{(7–5)}, 6–3 in the final.

== Seeds ==
1. (United States) Robert Kendrick (first round)
2. (United States) Michael Russell (first round)
3. (Germany) Björn Phau (second round)
4. (Germany) Rainer Schüttler (final)
5. (Germany) Dustin Brown (second round)
6. (United States) Ryan Sweeting (withdrew due to back spasms)
7. (Turkey) Marsel İlhan (first round)
8. (Australia) Marinko Matosevic (quarterfinals)

== Draw ==
Key

- Q = Qualifier
- WC = Wild card
- LL = Lucky loser
- Alt = Alternate
- ITF = ITF entry
- PR = Protected ranking
- SR = Special ranking
- SE = Special exempt
- JE = Junior exempt
- JR = Junior Accelerator Programme entrant
- CO = College Accelerator Programme entrant
- NG = Next Gen Accelerator Program entrant
- w/o = Walkover
- r = Retired
- d = Defaulted

=== Finals ===
Semifinals
(United States) Alex Kuznetsov	4	3
4	(Germany) Rainer Schüttler	6	6
(Australia) Matthew Ebden	2	3
(United States) Alex Bogomolov Jr.	6	6

Final
4	(Germany) Rainer Schüttler	6^{5}	3
(United States) Alex Bogomolov Jr.	7^{7}	6

=== Top half ===
First round
1	(United States) R Kendrick	6	4	6^{1}
(United States) R Harrison	3	6	7^{7}
Alt	(United States) G Oullette	6	4	1
(United States) L Cook	1	6	6
(United States) A Kuznetsov	6	7
PR	(United States) M McClune	4	5
WC	(United States) M Yani	4	6	6
LL	(South Africa) R Klaasen	6	4	3
4	(Germany) R Schüttler	7	6
Q	(United States) Alexander Domijan	5	2
(Australia) S Groth	4
(United States) T Smyczek	1	r
(United States) R Ram	5	4
(United States) B Reynolds	7	6
Q	(Romania) A Dăescu	3	6^{3}
8	(Australia) M Matosevic	6	7^{7}

Second round
(United States) R Harrison	6	6
(United States) L Cook	4	3
(United States) A Kuznetsov	7^{8}	7
WC	(United States) M Yani	6^{6}	5
4	(Germany) R Schüttler	7^{7}	6
(Australia) S Groth	6^{4}	1
(United States) B Reynolds	7	6^{1}	2
8	(Australia) M Matosevic	5	7^{7}	6

Quarterfinals
(United States) R Harrison	6^{5}	3
(United States) A Kuznetsov	7^{7}	6
4	(Germany) R Schüttler	6	6
8	(Australia) M Matosevic	3	2

Semifinals
(United States) A Kuznetsov	4	3
4	(Germany) R Schüttler	6	6

=== Bottom half ===
First round
5	(Germany) D Brown	7^{7}	6
Q	(United States) P Simmonds	6^{5}	3
(Australia) M Ebden	6	4	6
Q	(United States) Jarmere Jenkins	4	6	3
(South Africa) R de Voest	4	2
WC	(United States) J Sock	6	6
(Slovakia) I Klec	4	5
3	(Germany) B Phau	6	7
7	(Turkey) M İlhan	7^{7}	2	2
(Australia) G Jones	6^{4}	6	6
(South Africa) I van der Merwe	6	4	4
WC	(United States) D Kudla	4	6	6
(United States) A Bogomolov Jr.	5
WC	(Australia) B Tomic	2	r
(United States) J Witten	6	6
2	(United States) M Russell	2	4

Second round
5	(Germany) D Brown	3	2
(Australia) M Ebden	6	6
WC	(United States) J Sock	6	6
3	(Germany) B Phau	2	4
(Australia) G Jones	3	7^{7}	6
WC	(United States) D Kudla	6	6^{3}	2
(United States) A Bogomolov Jr.	6	6
(United States) J Witten	2	4

Quarterfinals
(Australia) M Ebden	6^{5}	6	6
WC	(United States) J Sock	7^{7}	3	1
(Australia) G Jones	3	7^{8}	4
(United States) A Bogomolov Jr.	6	6^{6}	6

Semifinals
(Australia) M Ebden	2	3
(United States) A Bogomolov Jr.	6	6
