= 2019 RBC Tennis Championships of Dallas – Singles =

Singles
- 2019 RBC Tennis Championships of Dallas

Final
- Champion: (United States) Mitchell Krueger
- Runner-up: (United States) Mackenzie McDonald
- Score: 4–6, 7–6^{(7–3)}, 6–1

Events
Singles	Doubles
- RBC Tennis Championships of Dallas

Kei Nishikori was the defending champion but chose not to defend his title.

Mitchell Krueger won the title after defeating Mackenzie McDonald 4–6, 7–6^{(7–3)}, 6–1 in the final.

== Seeds ==
All seeds receive a bye into the second round.

1. (United States) Mackenzie McDonald (final)
2. (United States) Ryan Harrison (second round, withdrew)
3. (United States) Reilly Opelka (semifinals)
4. (Chinese Taipei) Jason Jung (quarterfinals)
5. (Serbia) Miomir Kecmanović (second round, retired)
6. (United States) Bjorn Fratangelo (semifinals, withdrew)
7. (United States) Noah Rubin (withdrew)
8. (United States) Christopher Eubanks (second round)
9. (Germany) Dominik Köpfer (quarterfinals)
10. (Canada) Brayden Schnur (quarterfinals)
11. (Ecuador) Roberto Quiroz (second round)
12. (United States) Tim Smyczek (second round)
13. (United States) Ernesto Escobedo (second round)
14. (United States) Mitchell Krueger (champion)
15. (Brazil) Thomaz Bellucci (third round)
16. (Germany) Dustin Brown (third round)

== Draw ==
Key

- Q = Qualifier
- WC = Wild card
- LL = Lucky loser
- Alt = Alternate
- ITF = ITF entry
- PR = Protected ranking
- SR = Special ranking
- SE = Special exempt
- JE = Junior exempt
- JR = Junior Accelerator Programme entrant
- CO = College Accelerator Programme entrant
- NG = Next Gen Accelerator Program entrant
- w/o = Walkover
- r = Retired
- d = Defaulted

=== Finals ===
Quarterfinals
1	(United States) Mackenzie McDonald	6	6
10	(Canada) Brayden Schnur	2	2
3	(United States) Reilly Opelka	7^{11}	3	7^{14}
9	(Germany) Dominik Köpfer	6^{9}	6	6^{12}
6	(United States) Bjorn Fratangelo	7^{8}	6^{6}	6
4	(Chinese Taipei) Jason Jung	6^{6}	7^{8}	1
(United States) Marcos Giron	5	7^{8}	3
14	(United States) Mitchell Krueger	7	6^{6}	6

Semifinals
1	(United States) Mackenzie McDonald	6	7^{15}
3	(United States) Reilly Opelka	4	6^{13}
6	(United States) Bjorn Fratangelo
14	(United States) Mitchell Krueger	w/o

Final
1	(United States) Mackenzie McDonald	6	6^{3}	1
14	(United States) Mitchell Krueger	4	7^{7}	6

=== Top half ===
==== Section 1 ====
First round
ITF	(Brazil) J Souza	6	6^{7}	2
(United Kingdom) L Broady	4	7^{9}	6
WC	(United States) A Rybakov	6	6
(United States) S Kozlov	2	1
(Portugal) G Oliveira	2	6	1
(United States) Mi Redlicki	6	4	6
(Russia) E Karlovskiy	6	7
WC	(United States) Harrison Adams	3	5

Second round
1	(United States) M McDonald	6	6
(United Kingdom) L Broady	3	4
WC	(United States) A Rybakov	2	4
16	(Germany) D Brown	6	6
10	(Canada) B Schnur	7^{7}	6
(United States) Mi Redlicki	6^{4}	4
(Russia) E Karlovskiy	3	7^{7}	2
LL	(United States) Ma Redlicki	6	6^{3}	6

Third round
1	(United States) M McDonald	6	6
16	(Germany) D Brown	4	2
10	(Canada) B Schnur	6	6
LL	(United States) Ma Redlicki	4	4

Quarterfinals
1	(United States) M McDonald	6	6
10	(Canada) B Schnur	2	2

==== Section 2 ====
First round
(United Kingdom) J Choinski	6	6
WC	(United States) E Zhu	4	4
ITF	(Netherlands) J Sels	6	6^{1}	4
(United States) T-S Kwiatkowski	4	7^{7}	6
WC	(United States) W Blumberg	4	5
(France) V Millot	6	7
WC	(United States) E King	6	6
(United States) Evan Song	4	4

Second round
3	(United States) R Opelka	4	6	6
(United Kingdom) J Choinski	6	3	4
(United States) T-S Kwiatkowski	4	7	5
15	(Brazil) T Bellucci	6	5	7
9	(Germany) D Köpfer	6	6
(France) V Millot	4	1
WC	(United States) E King	6	0
5	(Serbia) M Kecmanović	3	0^{r}

Third round
3	(United States) R Opelka	6	6
15	(Brazil) T Bellucci	4	4
9	(Germany) D Köpfer	7	7^{7}
WC	(United States) E King	5	6^{3}

Quarterfinals
3	(United States) R Opelka	7^{11}	3	7^{14}
9	(Germany) D Köpfer	6^{9}	6	6^{12}

=== Bottom half ===
==== Section 3 ====
First round
(Canada) F Peliwo	5	7^{7}	6
ITF	(Argentina) MF Descotte	7	6^{4}	3
(United States) Jared Hiltzik	6	4	7
(Japan) K Uchida	2	6	5
(Croatia) B Gojo	6	6
Q	(Netherlands) G Brouwer	2	2
(United States) C Harrison	6	7^{7}
Q	(United States) M Cressy	4	6^{4}

Second round
6	(United States) B Fratangelo	6	7^{7}
(Canada) F Peliwo	2	6^{4}
(United States) J Hiltzik	6	4	6
11	(Ecuador) R Quiroz	2	6	0
13	(United States) E Escobedo	4	4
(Croatia) B Gojo	6	6
(United States) C Harrison	7^{7}	6^{5}	5
4	(Chinese Taipei) J Jung	6^{4}	7^{7}	7

Third round
6	(United States) B Fratangelo	7^{7}	7^{7}
(United States) J Hiltzik	6^{3}	6^{2}
(Croatia) B Gojo	2	6^{4}
4	(Chinese Taipei) J Jung	6	7^{7}

Quarterfinals
6	(United States) B Fratangelo	7^{8}	6^{6}	6
4	(Chinese Taipei) J Jung	6^{6}	7^{8}	1

==== Section 4 ====
First round
(United States) D Novikov	1	1
LL	(Ecuador) E Gómez	6	6
(United States) M Giron	7	6
ITF	(Germany) L Wessels	5	1
(United States) U Blanch	0^{r}
(Dominican Republic) R Cid Subervi	3
(Spain) M Vilella Martínez	6	6
(United States) A Sarkissian	4	4

Second round
8	(United States) C Eubanks	6^{11}	6^{5}
LL	(Ecuador) E Gómez	7^{13}	7^{7}
(United States) M Giron	6^{8}	6	7^{8}
12	(United States) T Smyczek	7^{10}	2	6^{6}
14	(United States) M Krueger	6	3	6
(Dominican Republic) R Cid Subervi	4	6	3
(Spain) M Vilella Martínez	w/o
2	(United States) R Harrison

Third round
LL	(Ecuador) E Gómez	3	4
(United States) M Giron	6	6
14	(United States) M Krueger	6	6
(Spain) M Vilella Martínez	2	1

Quarterfinals
(United States) M Giron	5	7^{8}	3
14	(United States) M Krueger	7	6^{6}	6
