= 2011 Challenger of Dallas – Doubles =

Doubles
- 2011 Challenger of Dallas

Final
- Champions: (United States) Scott Lipsky (United States) Rajeev Ram
- Runners-up: (Germany) Dustin Brown (Germany) Björn Phau
- Score: 7–6^{(7–3)}, 6–4

Events
| Singles | Doubles |
- Challenger of Dallas

The 2011 Challenger of Dallas was a professional tennis tournament played on indoor hard courts. It was a Challenger of Dallas competition that forms part of the 2011 ATP Challenger Tour. It took place in Dallas, United States, between 28 February and 6 March 2011. Scott Lipsky and David Martin were the defending champions, but they decided not to participate together.
Martin played alongside Bobby Reynolds, but they were eliminated by Matthew Ebden and Samuel Groth already in the first round.
Lipsky partnered up with Rajeev Ram and they won this tournament, defeating Dustin Brown and Björn Phau 7–6^{(7–3)}, 6–4 in the final.

== Seeds ==
1. (United States) Scott Lipsky / (United States) Rajeev Ram (champions)
2. (South Africa) Rik de Voest / (South Africa) Izak van der Merwe (first round)
3. (United States) David Martin / (United States) Bobby Reynolds (first round)
4. (Germany) Dustin Brown / (Germany) Björn Phau (final)

== Draw ==
Key

- Q = Qualifier
- WC = Wild card
- LL = Lucky loser
- Alt = Alternate
- ITF = ITF entry
- PR = Protected ranking
- SR = Special ranking
- SE = Special exempt
- JE = Junior exempt
- JR = Junior Accelerator Programme entrant
- CO = College Accelerator Programme entrant
- NG = Next Gen Accelerator Program entrant
- w/o = Walkover
- r = Retired
- d = Defaulted

=== Draw ===
First round
1 | (United States) S Lipsky (United States) R Ram | 6 | 6
WC | (United States) Andrew Korinek (United States) T.J. Tisdale | 2 | 2
(Australia) G Jones (Australia) M Matosevic | 4 | 6 | [4]
(Turkey) M İlhan (Slovakia) I Klec | 6 | 3 | [10]
3 | (United States) D Martin (United States) B Reynolds | 6^{2} | 4
(Australia) M Ebden (Australia) S Groth | 7^{7} | 6
(United States) A Bogomolov Jr. (United States) A Kuznetsov | 6 | 6
(United States) L Cook (United States) J Witten | 4 | 4
(Sweden) J Brunström (United States) T Parrott | 6 | 6
WC | (United States) Mitchell Krueger (United States) Dane Webb | 4 | 1
(United States) Brett Joelson (United States) R Kendrick | 6 | 3 | [7]
4 | (Germany) D Brown (Germany) B Phau | 3 | 6 | [10]
WC | (United States) D Kudla (United States) J Sock | 6 | 3 | [2]
Q | (United States) JP Fruttero (United States) N Monroe | 4 | 6 | [10]
(South Africa) R Klaasen (Serbia) D Vemić | 7^{7} | 6
2 | (South Africa) R de Voest (South Africa) I van der Merwe | 6^{5} | 4

Quarterfinals
1 | (United States) S Lipsky (United States) R Ram | 6 | 6
(Turkey) M İlhan (Slovakia) I Klec | 2 | 3
(Australia) M Ebden (Australia) S Groth | 6 | 6
(United States) A Bogomolov Jr. (United States) A Kuznetsov | 3 | 4
(Sweden) J Brunström (United States) T Parrott | 6^{4} | 7^{7} | [10]
4 | (Germany) D Brown (Germany) B Phau | 7^{7} | 6^{3} | [12]
Q | (United States) JP Fruttero (United States) N Monroe | 4 | 4
(South Africa) R Klaasen (Serbia) D Vemić | 6 | 6

Semifinals
1 | (United States) S Lipsky (United States) R Ram | 3 | 6 | [10]
(Australia) M Ebden (Australia) S Groth | 6 | 3 | [5]
4 | (Germany) D Brown (Germany) B Phau | 3 | 7 | [10]
(South Africa) R Klaasen (Serbia) D Vemić | 6 | 5 | [6]

Final
1 | (United States) S Lipsky (United States) R Ram | 7^{7} | 6
4 | (Germany) D Brown (Germany) B Phau | 6^{3} | 4
