= 2018 RBC Tennis Championships of Dallas – Doubles =

Doubles
- 2018 RBC Tennis Championships of Dallas

Final
- Champions: (India) Jeevan Nedunchezhiyan (Indonesia) Christopher Rungkat
- Runners-up: (India) Leander Paes (United Kingdom) Joe Salisbury
- Score: 6–4, 3–6, [10–7]

Events
Singles	Doubles
- RBC Tennis Championships of Dallas

David O'Hare and Joe Salisbury were the defending champions but only Salisbury chose to defend his title, partnering Leander Paes. Salisbury lost in the final to Jeevan Nedunchezhiyan and Christopher Rungkat.

Nedunchezhiyan and Rungkat won the title after defeating Paes and Salisbury 6–4, 3–6, [10–7] in the final.

== Seeds ==
1. (India) Leander Paes / (United Kingdom) Joe Salisbury (final)
2. (Uruguay) Ariel Behar / (Argentina) Máximo González (quarterfinals)
3. (United States) Austin Krajicek / (United States) Jackson Withrow (semifinals)
4. (India) Jeevan Nedunchezhiyan / (Indonesia) Christopher Rungkat (champions)

== Draw ==
Key

- Q = Qualifier
- WC = Wild card
- LL = Lucky loser
- Alt = Alternate
- ITF = ITF entry
- PR = Protected ranking
- SR = Special ranking
- SE = Special exempt
- JE = Junior exempt
- JR = Junior Accelerator Programme entrant
- CO = College Accelerator Programme entrant
- NG = Next Gen Accelerator Program entrant
- w/o = Walkover
- r = Retired
- d = Defaulted

First round
1	(India) L Paes (United Kingdom) J Salisbury	4	6	[18]
(Belarus) A Bury (Chinese Taipei) H-y Peng	6	1	[16]
(Philippines) R Gonzales (United States) H Reese	4
(United States) M McDonald (United States) T Paul	3^{r}
3	(United States) A Krajicek (United States) J Withrow	7	6
WC	(United States) R Galloway (United States) A Reed	5	4
(Mexico) H Hach Verdugo (United States) M Krueger	7	4	[5]
WC	(United States) Ian Dempster (Germany) C Seraphim	5	6	[10]
WC	(United States) H Johnson (United States) Y Johnson	3	3
(United Kingdom) L Bambridge (United States) D Kudla	6	6
(United States) J Cerretani (Croatia) A Pavić	6	6^{5}	[7]
4	(India) J Nedunchezhiyan (Indonesia) C Rungkat	1	7^{7}	[10]
(United States) D Novikov (Portugal) G Oliveira	6	6
(Canada) F Peliwo (Canada) B Schnur	4	4
Q	(Spain) Í Cervantes (Spain) G Olaso	4	7^{7}	[5]
2	(Uruguay) A Behar (Argentina) M González	6	6^{5}	[10]

Quarterfinals
1	(India) L Paes (United Kingdom) J Salisbury	6	2	[17]
(Philippines) R Gonzales (United States) H Reese	3	6	[15]
3	(United States) A Krajicek (United States) J Withrow	7^{7}	6
WC	(United States) I Dempster (Germany) C Seraphim	6^{2}	2
(United Kingdom) L Bambridge (United States) D Kudla	3	6	[4]
4	(India) J Nedunchezhiyan (Indonesia) C Rungkat	6	3	[10]
(United States) D Novikov (Portugal) G Oliveira	6	7
2	(Uruguay) A Behar (Argentina) M González	3	5

Semifinals
1	(India) L Paes (United Kingdom) J Salisbury	7^{7}	6
3	(United States) A Krajicek (United States) J Withrow	6^{3}	4
4	(India) J Nedunchezhiyan (Indonesia) C Rungkat	6	6
(United States) D Novikov (Portugal) G Oliveira	3	3

Final
1	(India) L Paes (United Kingdom) J Salisbury	4	6	[7]
4	(India) J Nedunchezhiyan (Indonesia) C Rungkat	6	3	[10]
