= 2014 Challenger of Dallas – Singles =

Singles
- 2014 Challenger of Dallas

Final
- Champion: (United States) Steve Johnson
- Runner-up: (Tunisia) Malek Jaziri
- Score: 6–4, 6–4

Events
| Singles | Doubles |
- Challenger of Dallas

Rhyne Williams was the defending champion but lost in the quarterfinal to Malek Jaziri.

Johnson won the title, defeating Malek Jaziri in the final, 6–4, 6–4.

== Seeds ==
1. (United States) Michael Russell (first round)
2. (Russia) Alex Bogomolov Jr. (second round)
3. (United States) Tim Smyczek (withdrew)
4. (United States) Denis Kudla (second round)
5. (Canada) Frank Dancevic (Withdrawn)
6. (United States) Ryan Harrison (second round)
7. (United States) Rhyne Williams (quarterfinals)
8. (United States) Alex Kuznetsov (first round)
9. (Canada) Peter Polansky (second round)

== Draw ==
Key

- Q = Qualifier
- WC = Wild card
- LL = Lucky loser
- Alt = Alternate
- ITF = ITF entry
- PR = Protected ranking
- SR = Special ranking
- SE = Special exempt
- JE = Junior exempt
- JR = Junior Accelerator Programme entrant
- CO = College Accelerator Programme entrant
- NG = Next Gen Accelerator Program entrant
- w/o = Walkover
- r = Retired
- d = Defaulted

=== Finals ===
Semifinals
(Tunisia) Malek Jaziri | 6 | 5 | 6
(Germany) Tim Puetz | 4 | 7 | 3
(United States) Steve Johnson | 6 | 6
(Dominican Republic) Víctor Estrella Burgos | 1 | 1

Final
(Tunisia) Malek Jaziri | 4 | 4
(United States) Steve Johnson | 6 | 6

=== Top half ===
First round
1 | (United States) M Russell | 7^{7} | 3 | 4
(United States) R Ram | 6^{4} | 6 | 6
(Germany) M Zverev | 1 | 2
(Tunisia) M Jaziri | 6 | 6
WC | (South Africa) J Andersen | 7^{7} | 6
(United States) T Sandgren | 6^{1} | 4
Q | (United States) Dennis Nevolo | 6^{4} | 0
7 | (United States) R Williams | 7^{7} | 6
4 | (United States) D Kudla | 6 | 6
(Dominican Republic) J Hernández | 3 | 3
(Australia) S Groth | 7^{8} | 6
WC | (United States) J Donaldson | 6^{6} | 2
(Germany) T Puetz | 6 | 1 | 6
(United States) B Reynolds | 3 | 6 | 1
Alt | (United States) C Buchanan | 6 | 4 | 6^{7}
9 | (Canada) P Polansky | 3 | 6 | 7^{9}

Second round
(United States) R Ram | 3 | 6 | 6^{2}
(Tunisia) M Jaziri | 6 | 3 | 7^{7}
WC | (South Africa) J Andersen | 2 | 6^{6}
7 | (United States) R Williams | 6 | 7^{8}
4 | (United States) D Kudla | 3 | 4
(Australia) S Groth | 6 | 6
(Germany) T Puetz | 6 | 6
9 | (Canada) P Polansky | 1 | 2

Quarterfinals
(Tunisia) M Jaziri | 2 | 6 | 7^{8}
7 | (United States) R Williams | 6 | 4 | 6^{6}
(Australia) S Groth | 6^{5} | 1
(Germany) T Puetz | 7^{7} | 6

Semifinals
(Tunisia) M Jaziri | 6 | 5 | 6
(Germany) T Puetz | 4 | 7 | 3

=== Bottom half ===
First round
6 | (United States) R Harrison | 6 | 6
(Portugal) G Elias | 3 | 4
WC | (United States) C Thompson | 1 | 7 | 4
(United States) S Johnson | 6 | 5 | 6
Q | (United States) E King | 6 | 6
SE | (United States) D Kosakowski | 4 | 2
Q | (United States) Justin S. Shane | 3 | 2
LL | (United States) J Jung | 6 | 6
8 | (United States) A Kuznetsov | 6^{5} | 6^{4}
(Dominican Republic) V Estrella Burgos | 7^{7} | 7^{7}
(Chinese Taipei) J Wang | 7^{7} | 6
LL | (Brazil) Wilson Leite | 6^{5} | 3
WC | (United States) John Mee | 3 | 3
(Republic of Ireland) J McGee | 6 | 6
Q | (United States) N Meister | 4 | 1
2 | (Russia) A Bogomolov Jr. | 6 | 6

Second round
6 | (United States) R Harrison | 2 | 4
(United States) S Johnson | 6 | 6
Q | (United States) E King | 6 | 7^{7}
LL | (United States) J Jung | 2 | 6^{4}
(Dominican Republic) V Estrella Burgos | 6 | 3 | 7
(Chinese Taipei) J Wang | 4 | 6 | 5
(Republic of Ireland) J McGee | 6 | 6
2 | (Russia) A Bogomolov Jr. | 1 | 2

Quarterfinals
(United States) S Johnson | 6 | 6
(United States) E King | 3 | 2
(Dominican Republic) V Estrella Burgos | 7^{7} | 6
(Republic of Ireland) J McGee | 6^{5} | 2

Semifinals
(United States) S Johnson | 6 | 6
(Dominican Republic) V Estrella Burgos | 1 | 1
