= Dean O'Brien (tennis) =

South African tennis player

- Full name: Dean Kevin O'Brien
- Country (sports): South Africa
- Residence: Atlanta, United States
- Born: 15 May 1990 (age 36) Johannesburg, South Africa
- Height: 1.78 m (5 ft 10 in)
- Plays: Right-handed (two-handed both sides)
- College: Georgia Tech
- Coach: Jaime Cortez
- Prize money: $ 63,357
- Official website: http://deankobrien.com/tennis/

Singles
- Career record: 0–2
- Career titles: 0; 0 Challenger, 0 Futures
- Highest ranking: No. 507 (21 April 2014)

Doubles
- Career record: 2–2
- Career titles: 0; 1 Challenger, 7 Futures
- Highest ranking: No. 115 (23 May 2016)
- Last updated on: 25 May 2021.

Dean Kevin O'Brien (born 15 May 1990 in Sandton) is a South African tennis player. He played college tennis for the Georgia Tech Yellow Jackets.

O'Brien has a career high ATP singles ranking of 507 achieved on 21 April 2014. He also has a career high ATP doubles ranking of 115 achieved on 23 May 2016. He has won 6 ITF doubles titles.

O'Brien won his first ATP Challenger title at the 2015 Levene Gouldin & Thompson Tennis Challenger in the doubles event partnering Ruan Roelofse.

Overall, O'Brien has reached 26 career doubles finals with a record of 8 wins and 18 losses, among which includes a 1–6 record in ATP Challenger Tour finals.

Playing for the South Africa in Davis Cup, O'Brien has a W/L record of 1–2.

== ATP Challenger and ITF Futures finals ==
=== Doubles: 26 (8–18) ===
Legend ATP Challenger (1–6) ITF Futures (7–12)	Finals by surface Hard (7–17) Clay (1–1) Grass (0–0) Carpet (0–0)

Result	W–L	Date	Tournament	Tier	Surface	Partner	Opponents	Score
Loss	0–1	Jun 2009	Spain F12, Melilla	Futures	Hard	(Spain) Borja Zarco	(Spain) Ignacio Coll Riudavets (Spain) Andoni Vivanco-Guzmán	5–7, 6–1, [3–10]
Loss	0–2	Mar 2013	USA F6, Harlingen	Futures	Hard	(United States) Kevin King	(Philippines) Ruben Gonzales (Australia) Chris Letcher	2–6, 3–6
Loss	0–3	Jun 2013	Israel F10, Herzliya	Futures	Hard	(France) Antoine Benneteau	(France) Elie Rousset (France) Albano Olivetti	3–6, 6–7^{(6–8)}
Win	1–3	Jun 2013	Turkey F25, Istanbul	Futures	Hard	(South Africa) Ruan Roelofse	(Turkey) Baris Erguden (Turkey) Barkin Yalcinkale	6–1, 4–6, [11–9]
Loss	1–4	Sep 2013	France F16, Plaisir	Futures	Hard	(Republic of Ireland) Colin O'Brien	(France) Julien Obry (France) Rémi Boutillier	6–3, 6–7^{(4–7)}, [14–16]
Loss	1–5	Oct 2013	Mexico F13, Veracruz	Futures	Hard	(Colombia) Juan Carlos Spir	(Mexico) César Ramírez (Puerto Rico) Alex Llompart	4–6, 6–3, [5–10]
Loss	1–6	Oct 2013	Mexico F14, Pachuca	Futures	Hard	(Colombia) Juan Carlos Spir	(Guatemala) Christopher Diaz-Figueroa (Barbados) Darian King	4–6, 6–2, [8–10]
Win	2–6	Nov 2013	Colombia F6, Popayán	Futures	Hard	(Colombia) Juan Carlos Spir	(Germany) Jonas Luetjen (Colombia) Steffen Zornosa	6–4, 6–0
Loss	2–7	Nov 2013	Colombia F7, Bogotá	Futures	Hard	(Colombia) Juan Carlos Spir	(Colombia) Eduardo Struvay (Colombia) Felipe Mantilla	6–7^{(5–7)}, 6–2, [7–10]
Loss	2–8	Apr 2014	Mexico F1, Querétaro	Futures	Hard	(United States) Kevin King	(Mexico) César Ramírez (Mexico) Miguel Ángel Reyes-Varela	3–6, 5–7
Loss	2–9	May 2014	Mexico F2, Córdoba	Futures	Hard	(United States) Kevin King	(Mexico) César Ramírez (Mexico) Miguel Ángel Reyes-Varela	6–7^{(1–7)}, 1–6
Win	3–9	May 2014	Mexico F3, Mexico City	Futures	Hard	(United States) Kevin King	(Argentina) Mateo Nicolas Martinez (Puerto Rico) Alex Llompart	6–3, 6–4
Win	4–9	Jun 2014	South Africa F3, Sun City	Futures	Hard	(South Africa) Ruan Roelofse	(South Africa) Nicolaas Scholtz (South Africa) Tucker Vorster	7–6^{(8–6)}, 6–4
Loss	4–10	Aug 2014	Colombia F4, Medellín	Futures	Clay	(Colombia) Juan Carlos Spir	(Brazil) Fabiano de Paula (Chile) Nicolas Jarry	6–2, 2–6, [9–11]
Win	5–10	Sep 2014	Colombia F5, Ibagué	Futures	Clay	(Colombia) Nicolás Barrientos	(Brazil) Fabiano de Paula (Brazil) Marcelo Demoliner	6–3, 5–7, [10–7]
Loss	5–11	Dec 2014	Mexico F15, Mérida	Futures	Hard	(Colombia) Juan Carlos Spir	(United States) Eric Quigley (Canada) Philip Bester	6–4, 6–7^{(5–7)}, [10–12]
Loss	5–12	Mar 2015	Canada F1, Gatineau	Futures	Hard	(United States) Kevin King	(Belgium) Germain Gigounon (United Kingdom) Daniel Smethurst	4–6, 4–6
Win	6–12	Mar 2015	Canada F2, Sherbrooke	Futures	Hard	(United States) Kevin King	(United Kingdom) Edward Corrie (United Kingdom) Daniel Smethurst	6–4, 2–6, [10–5]
Loss	6–13	Jun 2015	Gimcheon, South Korea	Challenger	Hard	(South Africa) Ruan Roelofse	(China) Zhe Li (New Zealand) Jose Statham	4–6, 2–6
Win	7–13	Jun 2015	Uzbekistan F4, Namangan	Futures	Hard	(South Africa) Ruan Roelofse	(Uzbekistan) Jurabek Karimov (Uzbekistan) Sanjar Fayziev	7–5, 6–4
Win	8–13	Jul 2015	Binghamton, United States	Challenger	Hard	(South Africa) Ruan Roelofse	(United States) Dennis Novikov (United States) Daniel Nguyen	6–1, 7–6^{(7–0)}
Loss	8–14	Aug 2015	Lexington, United States	Challenger	Hard	(South Africa) Ruan Roelofse	(Australia) Carsten Ball (United Kingdom) Brydan Klein	4–6, 6–7^{(4–7)}
Loss	8–15	Oct 2015	Las Vegas, United States	Challenger	Hard	(South Africa) Ruan Roelofse	(Australia) Carsten Ball (Germany) Dustin Brown	6–3, 3–6, [6–10]
Loss	8–16	Feb 2016	Dallas, United States	Challenger	Hard	(United States) Sekou Bangoura	(United States) Nicolas Meister (United States) Eric Quigley	1–6, 1–6
Loss	8–17	May 2016	Bangkok, Thailand	Challenger	Hard	(South Africa) Ruan Roelofse	(Chinese Taipei) Jason Jung (Chinese Taipei) Chen Ti	4–6, 6–3, [8–10]
Loss	8–18	Feb 2017	Morelos, Mexico	Challenger	Hard	(United States) Kevin King	(United States) Jackson Withrow (United States) Austin Krajicek	7–6^{(7–4)}, 6–7^{(5–7)}, [9–12]
