= Prakash Amritraj =

American tennis player (born 1983)

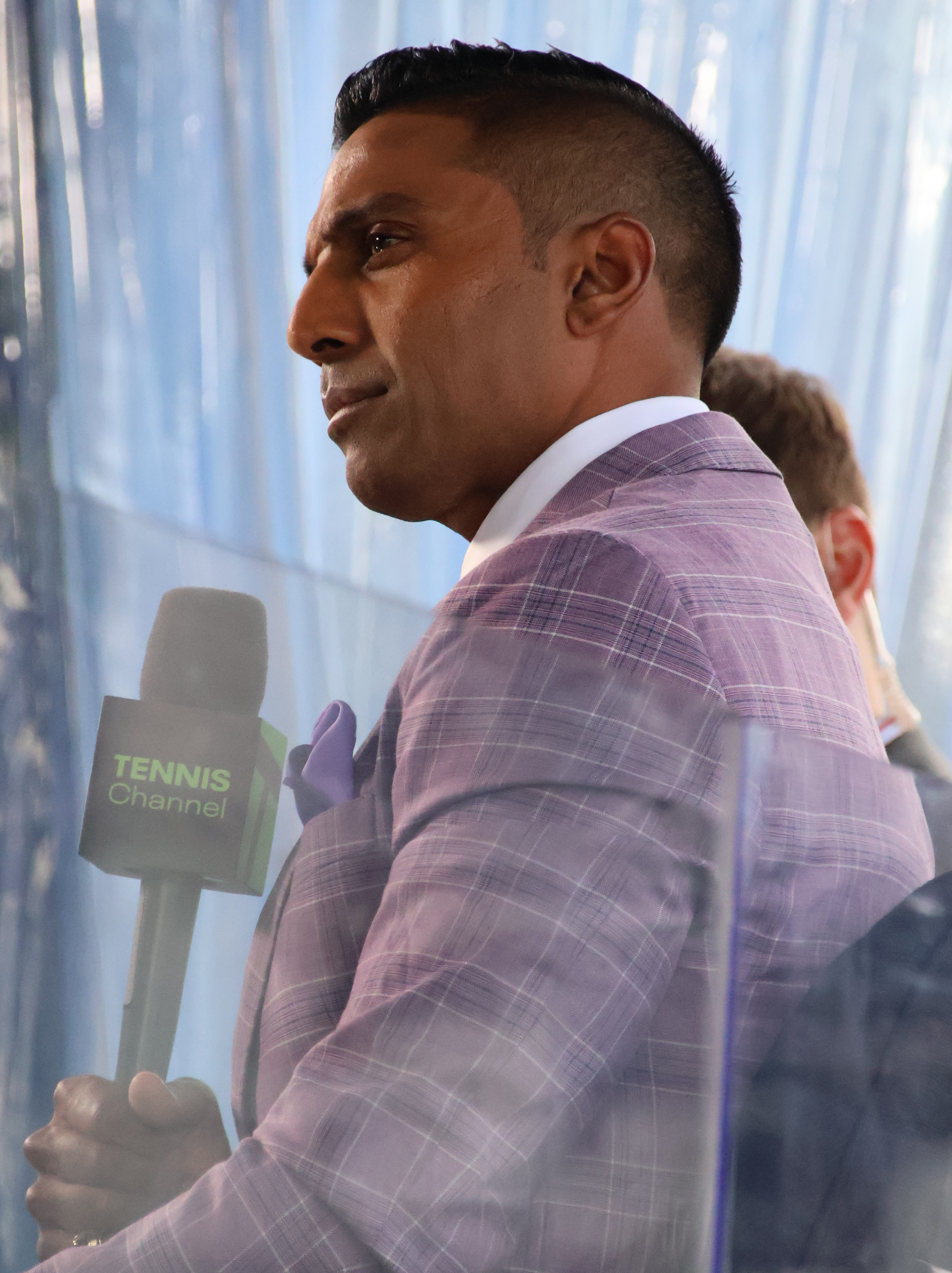
- Amritraj in 2026
- Country (sports): India
- Residence: Encino, Los Angeles, United States
- Born: October 2, 1983 (age 42) Los Angeles. United States
- Height: 1.88 m (6 ft 2 in)
- Turned pro: 2003
- Plays: Right-handed (two-handed backhand)
- Prize money: $460,805

Singles
- Career record: 20–33
- Career titles: 0
- Highest ranking: No. 154 (15 June 2009)

Grand Slam singles results
- Australian Open: Q3 (2008)
- French Open: Q1 (2009, 2010)
- Wimbledon: Q3 (2009, 2010)
- US Open: 1R (2002)

Doubles
- Career record: 12–21
- Career titles: 0
- Highest ranking: No. 119 (26 October 2009)

Grand Slam doubles results
- Australian Open: 2R (2010)
- Wimbledon: 3R (2009)
- US Open: 1R (2002)
Medal record
Representing India
Men's tennis
Afro-Asian Games
Gold medal – first place	2003 Hyderabad	Team Event
- Last updated on: 3 July 2022.

Prakash Amritraj (born October 2, 1983) is an Indian-American tennis commentator and former professional player who represented India in international tournaments. He is the son of former Indian tennis player Vijay Amritraj.

== Background ==
Prakash Amritraj is the son of Indian tennis player Vijay Amritraj and Shyamala, a Sri Lankan Tamil.

Prakash is the paternal cousin of fellow tour pro Stephen Amritraj, whose father Anand and paternal uncle Ashok were former professional tennis players representing India. Prakash has one brother, Vikram, who was born in 1987.

He played two years of college tennis for the University of Southern California. He won the United States Tennis Association (USTA) Boys' 18s National Championships in 2002.

== Professional career ==
In 2007, Amritraj won three straight ITF Pro Circuit tournaments in India, beating Karan Rastogi in all three finals.

On July 14, 2008, Amritraj played in his first ATP Tour final, losing to Fabrice Santoro from France in straight sets.

From August 2010 to August 2012, Amritraj was inactive on the tour. However, he returned to the court for the first time in just over two years when he competed as a wildcard in a qualifier at the 2012 Comerica Bank Challenger in Aptos, California.

Prakash Amritraj joined the staff of the Tennis Channel in 2016 as one of the network's primary travel reporters and also as an in-match analyst and a host both in-studio and at worldwide events. In February 2021, his contract was renewed for an additional three years through 2023.

== ATP career finals ==
=== Singles: 1 (1 runner-up) ===
Legend Grand Slam Tournaments (0–0) ATP World Tour Finals (0–0) ATP Masters 1000 Series (0–0) ATP 500 Series (0–0) ATP 250 Series (0–1)	Finals by surface Hard (0–0) Clay (0–0) Grass (0–1) Carpet (0–0)	Finals by setting Outdoors (0–1) Indoors (0–0)

Result	W–L	Date	Tournament	Tier	Surface	Opponent	Score
Loss	0–1	Jul 2008	Newport, United States	International Series	Grass	(France) Fabrice Santoro	3–6, 5–7

=== Doubles: 1 (1 runner-up) ===
Legend Grand Slam Tournaments (0–0) ATP World Tour Finals (0–0) ATP Masters 1000 Series (0–0) ATP 500 Series (0–0) ATP 250 Series (0–1)	Finals by surface Hard (0–1) Clay (0–0) Grass (0–0) Carpet (0–0)	Finals by setting Outdoors (0–1) Indoors (0–0)

Result	W–L	Date	Tournament	Tier	Surface	Partner	Opponents	Score
Loss	0–1	Jan 2006	Chennai, India	International Series	Hard	(India) Rohan Bopanna	(Slovakia) Michal Mertiňák (Czech Republic) Petr Pála	2–6, 5–7

== ATP Challenger and ITF Futures finals ==
=== Singles: 7 (4–3) ===
Legend ATP Challenger (0–2) ITF Futures (4–1)	Finals by surface Hard (4–2) Clay (0–0) Grass (0–1) Carpet (0–0)

Result	W–L	Date	Tournament	Tier	Surface	Opponent	Score
Loss	0–1	May 2004	Fergana, Uzbekistan	Challenger	Hard	(Russia) Igor Kunitsyn	4–6, 5–7
Loss	0–2	Jul 2005	Forest Hills, United States	Challenger	Grass	(Canada) Frédéric Niemeyer	4–6, 6–7^{(3–7)}
Win	1–2	Jun 2007	India F3, Chandigarh	Futures	Hard	(India) Karan Rastogi	7–6^{(7–5)}, 6–1
Win	2–2	Jun 2007	India F4, Dehradun	Futures	Hard	(India) Karan Rastogi	6–1, 6–2
Win	3–2	Jun 2007	India F5, Delhi	Futures	Hard	(India) Karan Rastogi	6–3, 6–1
Loss	3–3	Sep 2012	USA F24, Claremont	Futures	Hard	(United States) Daniel Kosakowski	3–6, 1–6
Win	4–3	Nov 2012	India F14, Pune	Futures	Hard	(India) Saketh Myneni	6–4, 6–2

=== Doubles: 14 (8–6) ===
Legend ATP Challenger (7–4) ITF Futures (1–2)	Finals by surface Hard (7–5) Clay (0–0) Grass (0–0) Carpet (1–1)

Result	W–L	Date	Tournament	Tier	Surface	Partner	Opponents	Score
Loss	0–1	Sep 2002	USA F24B, Costa Mesa	Futures	Hard	(United States) Rajeev Ram	(Sweden) Oskar Johansson (New Zealand) James Shortall	6–7^{(0–7)}, 3–6
Win	1–1	Nov 2002	USA F28, Costa Mesa	Futures	Hard	(United States) Rajeev Ram	(United Kingdom) Richard Bloomfield (United Kingdom) David Sherwood	6–2, 3–0 ret.
Win	2–1	Oct 2003	Tumkur, India	Challenger	Hard	(South Africa) Rik de Voest	(Slovakia) Michal Mertiňák (Slovakia) Branislav Sekáč	6–4, 6–3
Loss	2–2	Oct 2003	Dharwad, India	Challenger	Hard	(South Africa) Rik de Voest	(Thailand) Sonchat Ratiwatana (Thailand) Sanchai Ratiwatana	6–3, 3–6, 5–7
Loss	2–3	May 2004	Uzbekistan F4, Andijan	Futures	Hard	(Netherlands Antilles) Jean-Julien Rojer	(Kazakhstan) Alexey Kedryuk (Ukraine) Orest Tereshchuk	5–7, 4–6
Loss	2–4	Oct 2004	Burbank, United States	Challenger	Hard	(United States) Eric Taino	(United States) Nick Rainey (United States) Brian Wilson	2–6, 3–6
Loss	2–5	Mar 2006	Kyoto, Japan	Challenger	Carpet	(India) Rohan Bopanna	(Australia) Alun Jones (United Kingdom) Jonathan Marray	4–6, 6–3, [12–14]
Win	3–5	Jul 2006	Aptos, United States	Challenger	Hard	(India) Rohan Bopanna	(United States) Rajeev Ram (United States) Todd Widom	3–6, 6–2, [10–6]
Win	4–5	Jul 2008	Dublin, Ireland	Challenger	Carpet	(Pakistan) Aisam Qureshi	(Denmark) Frederik Nielsen (United Kingdom) Jonathan Marray	6–3, 7–6^{(8–6)}
Win	5–5	Nov 2008	Louisville, United States	Challenger	Hard	(United States) Jesse Levine	(Canada) Frank Dancevic (Serbia) Dušan Vemić	6–3, 7–6^{(12–10)}
Win	6–5	Feb 2009	Dallas, United States	Challenger	Hard	(United States) Rajeev Ram	(United States) Patrick Briaud (United States) Jason Marshall	6–3, 4–6, [10–8]
Loss	6–6	May 2009	Izmir, Turkey	Challenger	Hard	(United States) Rajeev Ram	(Israel) Jonathan Erlich (Israel) Harel Levy	3–6, 3–6
Win	7–6	Nov 2012	Yokohama, Japan	Challenger	Hard	(Austria) Philipp Oswald	(Thailand) Sonchat Ratiwatana (Thailand) Sanchai Ratiwatana	6–3, 6–4
Win	8–6	May 2013	Johannesburg, South Africa	Challenger	Hard	(United States) Rajeev Ram	(India) Purav Raja (India) Divij Sharan	7–6^{(7–1)}, 7–6^{(7–1)}

== Performance timeline ==
Key
W	F	SF	QF	#R	RR	Q#	P#	DNQ	A	Z#	PO	G	S	B	NMS	NTI	P	NH

(W) winner; (F) finalist; (SF) semifinalist; (QF) quarterfinalist; (#R) rounds 4, 3, 2, 1; (RR) round-robin stage; (Q#) qualification round; (P#) preliminary round; (DNQ) did not qualify; (A) absent; (Z#) Davis/Fed Cup Zonal Group (with number indication) or (PO) play-off; (G) gold, (S) silver or (B) bronze Olympic/Paralympic medal; (NMS) not a Masters tournament; (NTI) not a Tier I tournament; (P) postponed; (NH) not held; (SR) strike rate (events won / competed); (W–L) win–loss record.

=== Singles ===
Tournament	2002	2003	2004	2005	2006	2007	2008	2009	2010	SR	W–L	Win%
Grand Slam tournaments
Australian Open	A	A	A	A	Q2	A	Q3	Q1	Q2	0 / 0	0–0	–
French Open	A	A	A	A	A	A	A	Q1	Q1	0 / 0	0–0	–
Wimbledon	A	A	Q2	A	Q2	A	Q2	Q3	Q3	0 / 0	0–0	–
US Open	1R	A	A	Q2	A	Q1	Q1	Q1	A	0 / 1	0–1	0%
Win–loss	0–1	0–0	0–0	0–0	0–0	0–0	0–0	0–0	0–0	0 / 1	0–1	0%
ATP Tour Masters 1000
Indian Wells	A	Q1	Q1	A	A	A	A	A	Q1	0 / 0	0–0	–
Miami	A	A	Q1	A	A	A	A	A	A	0 / 0	0–0	–
Canada	A	A	A	A	A	Q1	A	A	A	0 / 0	0–0	–
Cincinnati	A	Q1	A	A	A	A	A	A	A	0 / 0	0–0	–
Win–loss	0–0	0–0	0–0	0–0	0–0	0–0	0–0	0–0	0–0	0 / 0	0–0	–
