= Patrick Briaud =

American tennis player

- Full name: Patrick Briaud
- Country (sports): United States
- Residence: College Station, Texas, U.S.
- Born: February 6, 1983 (age 43) College Station, Texas, U.S.
- Height: 1.83 m (6 ft 0 in)
- Turned pro: 2005
- Plays: Left-handed (two-handed backhand)
- College: University of California
- Prize money: US$26,077

Singles
- Career record: 9–16
- Highest ranking: 928

Doubles
- Career record: 1–1; 38–37; 37–19
- Highest ranking: 125

Patrick Briaud (born 6 February 1983) is an American professional tennis player.

== College career ==
Briaud played college tennis for the California Golden Bears.

== Pro career ==
Briaud's professional endeavors had only limited success, in doubles. He won two minor league Challenger-level doubles events in 2007, and had only one ATP Tour level appearance in his career. This was a quarterfinal loss in the 2007 Mumbai tournament, partnered with Wesley Moodie.

== World TeamTennis ==
Briaud was a member of the 2008 New York Buzz team, which won the King Trophy as World TeamTennis champions.
