= RBC Tennis Championships of Dallas =

- 2020 RBC Tennis Championships of Dallas

Defunct tennis tournament
- Event name: RBC Tennis Championships of Dallas
- Location: Dallas, United States
- Venue: T Bar M Racquet Club
- Category: ATP Challenger Tour
- Surface: Hard (indoor)
- Draw: 48S/4Q/16D
- Prize money: $135,400
- Website: Website

The RBC Tennis Championships of Dallas (formerly known as Challenger of Dallas) was a professional tennis tournament played on indoor hardcourts. It was part of the ATP Challenger Tour. It was held annually at the T Bar M Racquet Club in Dallas, United States, from 1998 until 2020.

Former RBC Tennis Championships of Dallas players include former world No.1 and 16-time doubles Grand Slam winners, Mike and Bob Bryan, 2014 Wimbledon doubles champions Jack Sock and Vasek Pospisil, U.S. Open finalists Kei Nishikori and Taylor Fritz, Career Golden Slam achiever Daniel Nestor, ATP Masters Cup finalist James Blake, Kyle Edmund, Steve Johnson and Frances Tiafoe.

== Past finals ==
=== Singles ===
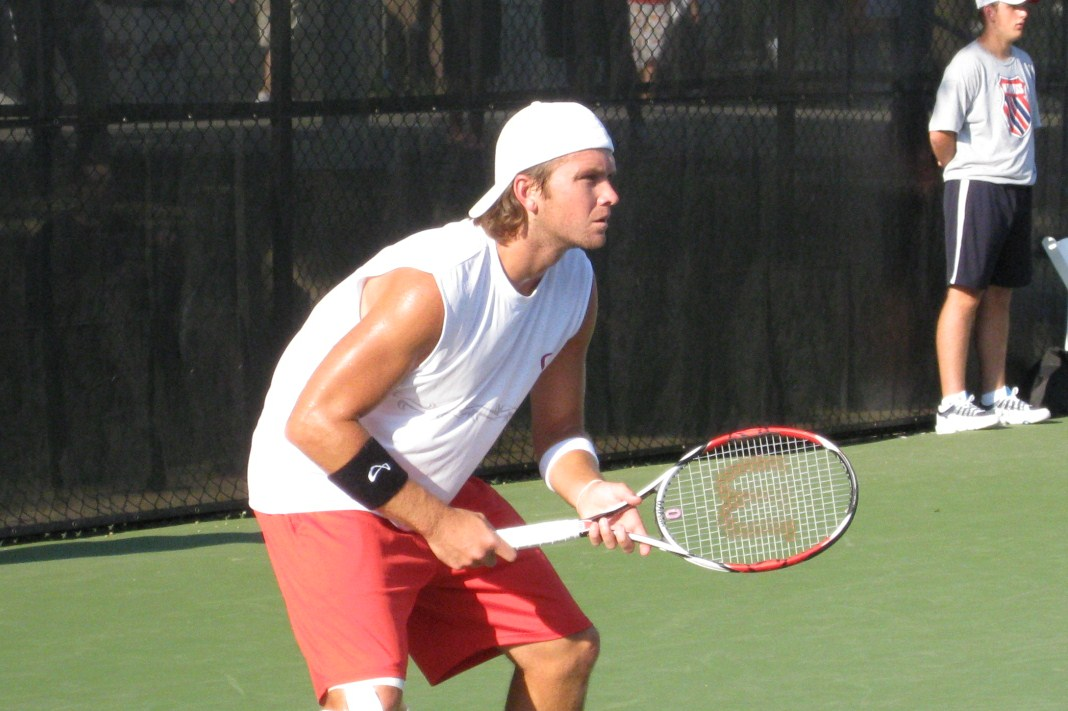
Robert Kendrick, champion in 2007, is one of ten Americans to have won the singles title in Dallas

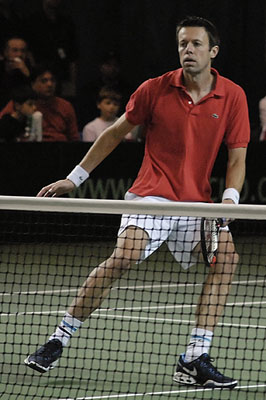
Eventual winner of a Career Golden Slam in doubles Daniel Nestor won the first singles title in 1998

Year	Champion	Runner-up	Score
1998	(Canada) Daniel Nestor	(Italy) Cristiano Caratti	6–1, 6–2
1999	(Brazil) André Sá	(Venezuela) Jimy Szymanski	7–5, 4–6, 6–4
2000	Not Held		
2001	(Russia) Dmitry Tursunov	(South Africa) Justin Bower	6–2, 6–4
2002	(United States) Jeff Morrison	(Netherlands) Martin Verkerk	6–4, 6–4
2003	(Germany) Simon Greul	(United States) Justin Gimelstob	6–3, 7–6^{(7–5)}
2004	(France) Sébastien de Chaunac	(United States) Amer Delić	6–4, 7–6^{(7–3)}
2005	(Sweden) Michael Ryderstedt	(Brazil) André Sá	6–7^{(2–7)}, 7–6^{(7–5)}, 6–2
2006	(United States) Kevin Kim	(United States) Robert Kendrick	1–6, 6–4, 6–1
2007	(United States) Robert Kendrick	(Germany) Benedikt Dorsch	6–3, 6–4
2008	(United States) Amer Delić	(Switzerland) Stéphane Bohli	6–4, 7–5
2009	(United States) Ryan Sweeting	(United States) Brendan Evans	6–4, 6–3
2010	(United States) Ryan Sweeting (2)	(Australia) Carsten Ball	6–4, 6–2
2011	(United States) Alex Bogomolov Jr.	(Germany) Rainer Schüttler	7–6^{(7–5)}, 6–3
2012	(United States) Jesse Levine	(Belgium) Steve Darcis	6–4, 6–4
2013	(United States) Rhyne Williams	(United States) Robby Ginepri	7–5, 6–3
2014	(United States) Steve Johnson	(Tunisia) Malek Jaziri	6–4, 6–4
2015	(United States) Tim Smyczek	(United States) Rajeev Ram	6–4, 4–1, ret.
2016	(United Kingdom) Kyle Edmund	(United Kingdom) Daniel Evans	6–3, 6–2
2017	(United States) Ryan Harrison	(United States) Taylor Fritz	6–3, 6–3
2018	(Japan) Kei Nishikori	(United States) Mackenzie McDonald	6–1, 6–4
2019	(United States) Mitchell Krueger	(United States) Mackenzie McDonald	4–6, 7–6^{(7–3)}, 6–1
2020	(Austria) Jurij Rodionov	(United States) Denis Kudla	7–5, 7–6^{(12–10)}

=== Doubles ===
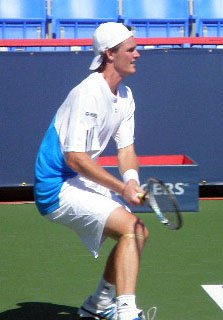
Jamie Murray from Scotland took the doubles title with American partner Eric Butorac in 2007

Year	Champions	Runners-up	Score
1998	(United States) Jared Palmer (United States) Jonathan Stark	(Australia) Michael Hill (United States) Scott Humphries	6–3, 6–4
1999	(Australia) Paul Kilderry (Australia) Grant Silcock	(United States) Mitch Sprengelmeyer (South Africa) Jason Weir-Smith	4–6, 6–3, 6–1
2000	Not Held		
2001	(United States) Gavin Sontag (Canada) Jerry Turek	(Federal Republic of Yugoslavia) Dušan Vemić (Croatia) Lovro Zovko	3–6, 7–5, 7–5
2002	(Italy) Giorgio Galimberti (Canada) Frédéric Niemeyer	(United States) Huntley Montgomery (United States) Brian Vahaly	7–6^{(7–1)}, 6–4
2003	(United States) Justin Gimelstob (United States) Scott Humphries	(Argentina) Martín García (United States) Graydon Oliver	7–6^{(9–7)}, 7–6^{(7–4)}
2004	(Australia) Jordan Kerr (Australia) Todd Perry	(South Africa) Rik de Voest (United States) Eric Taino	7–5, 6–3
2005	(South Africa) Rik de Voest (Ecuador) Giovanni Lapentti	(Paraguay) Ramón Delgado (Brazil) André Sá	6–4, 6–4
2006	(United States) Rajeev Ram (United States) Bobby Reynolds	(United States) Mirko Pehar (Serbia and Montenegro) Dušan Vemić	6–3, 6–4
2007	(United States) Eric Butorac (United Kingdom) Jamie Murray	(United States) Rajeev Ram (United States) Bobby Reynolds	6–4, 6–7^{(4–7)}, [10–7]
2008	(Germany) Benedikt Dorsch (Germany) Björn Phau	(United States) Scott Lipsky (United States) David Martin	6–4, 6–4
2009	(India) Prakash Amritraj (United States) Rajeev Ram (2)	(United States) Patrick Briaud (United States) Jason Marshall	6–3, 4–6, 10–8
2010	(United States) Scott Lipsky (United States) David Martin	(Canada) Vasek Pospisil (Canada) Adil Shamasdin	7–6^{(9–7)}, 6–3
2011	(United States) Scott Lipsky (2) (United States) Rajeev Ram (3)	(Germany) Dustin Brown (Germany) Björn Phau	7–6^{(7–3)}, 6–4
2012	(United Kingdom) Chris Eaton (United Kingdom) Dominic Inglot	(United States) Nicholas Monroe (United States) Jack Sock	6–7^{(6–8)}, 6–4, [19–17]
2013	(United States) Alex Kuznetsov (Germany) Mischa Zverev	(United States) Tennys Sandgren (United States) Rhyne Williams	6–4, 6–7^{(7–4)}, [10–5]
2014	(Australia) Samuel Groth (Australia) Chris Guccione	(United States) Ryan Harrison (The Bahamas) Mark Knowles	6–4, 6–2
2015	(Ukraine) Denys Molchanov (Russia) Andrey Rublev	(Mexico) Hans Hach Verdugo (Mexico) Luis Patiño	6–4, 7–6^{(7–5)}
2016	(United States) Nicolas Meister (United States) Eric Quigley	(United States) Sekou Bangoura (South Africa) Dean O'Brien	6–1, 6–1
2017	(Republic of Ireland) David O'Hare (United Kingdom) Joe Salisbury	(India) Jeevan Nedunchezhiyan (Indonesia) Christopher Rungkat	6–7^{(6–8)}, 6–3, [11–9]
2018	(India) Jeevan Nedunchezhiyan (Indonesia) Christopher Rungkat	(India) Leander Paes (United Kingdom) Joe Salisbury	6–4, 3–6, [10–7]
2019	(United States) Marcos Giron (United States) Dennis Novikov	(Croatia) Ante Pavić (South Africa) Ruan Roelofse	6–4, 7–6^{(7–3)}
2020	(United States) Dennis Novikov (Portugal) Gonçalo Oliveira	(Venezuela) Luis David Martínez (Mexico) Miguel Ángel Reyes-Varela	6–3, 6–4
