= Eric Quigley =

American tennis player

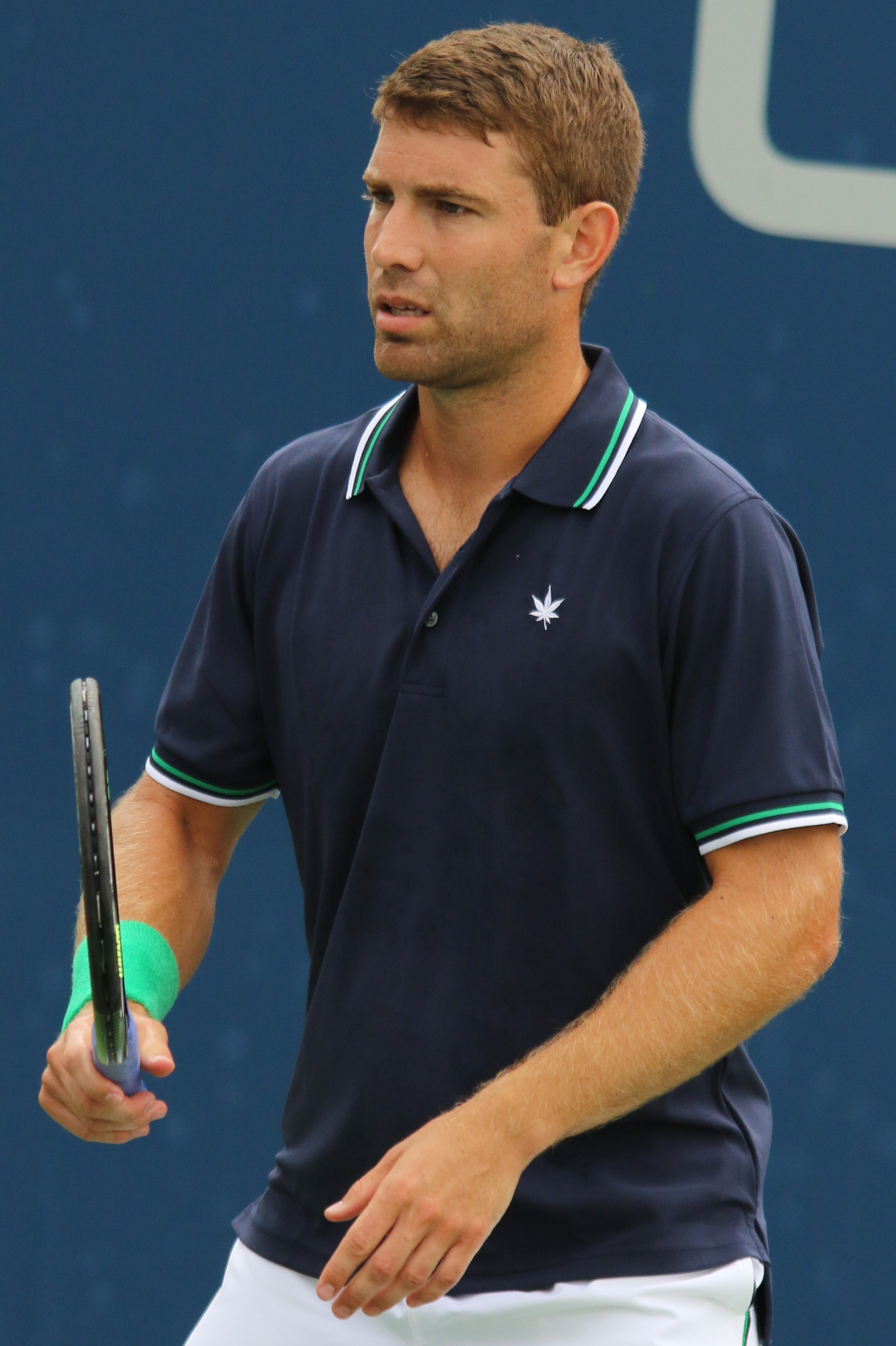
- Quigley at the 2016 US Open
- Country (sports): United States
- Residence: Louisville, Kentucky, U.S.
- Born: January 30, 1989 (age 37) Cincinnati, Ohio, U.S.
- Height: 1.85 m (6 ft 1 in)
- Turned pro: 2012
- Plays: Right-handed (two-handed backhand)
- Prize money: US$123,000

Singles
- Career record: 0–1
- Career titles: 0
- Highest ranking: No. 297 (17 August 2015)

Doubles
- Career record: 0–1
- Career titles: 0
- Highest ranking: No. 190 (31 October 2016)

Grand Slam doubles results
- US Open: 1R (2016)

Eric Quigley (born January 30, 1989) is an American professional tennis player.

== Early life ==
Quigley was a four-time Kentucky High School Athletic Association tennis champion. He attended South Oldham High School.

== College career ==
Quigley was an All-American and NCAA runner-up for the University of Kentucky.

== Professional career ==
In 2013, Quigley won his first professional singles tournament, an ITF Men's Circuit tournament in Decatur, Illinois.

In 2016, Quigley entered the US Open and played doubles with fellow American Nicolas Meister but they lost to Poland's Łukasz Kubot & Austria's Alexander Peya in the first round.

Quigley qualified for the main draw at the Delray Beach in 2015, but lost in the first round. This was his first ATP World Tour appearance.

== ATP Challenger and ITF Futures finals ==
=== Singles: 8 (1–7) ===
Legend ATP Challenger (0–0) ITF Futures (1–7)	Finals by surface Hard (1–6) Clay (0–1) Grass (0–0) Carpet (0–0)

Result	W–L	Date	Tournament	Tier	Surface	Opponent	Score
Loss	0–1	Aug 2012	USA F23, Edwardsville	Futures	Hard	(Croatia) Ante Pavić	6–7^{(3–7)}, 5–7
Win	1–1	Aug 2013	USA F21, Decatur	Futures	Hard	(Bulgaria) Dimitar Kutrovsky	7–6^{(7–3)}, 6–4
Loss	1–2	Feb 2014	USA F6, Boynton Beach	Futures	Clay	(Germany) Yannick Maden	6–7^{(5–7)}, 1–6
Loss	1–3	Sep 2014	Canada F10, Toronto	Futures	Hard	(United States) Bjorn Fratangelo	4–6, 2–6
Loss	1–4	Apr 2015	USA F12, Harlingen	Futures	Hard	(United States) Alexander Sarkissian	4–6, 4–6
Loss	1–5	May 2015	Nigeria F2, Abuja	Futures	Hard	(Croatia) Matija Pecotić	5–7, 3–6
Loss	1–6	Jul 2015	Canada F4, Kelowna	Futures	Hard	(Australia) Omar Jasika	6–3, 4–6, 6–7^{(4–7)}
Loss	1–7	Apr 2016	USA F13, Little Rock	Futures	Hard	(United States) Stefan Kozlov	7–6^{(7–3)}, 3–6, 6–7^{(10–12)}

=== Doubles: 15 (9–6) ===
Legend ATP Challenger (1–3) ITF Futures (8–3)	Finals by surface Hard (9–5) Clay (0–1) Grass (0–0) Carpet (0–0)

Result	W–L	Date	Tournament	Tier	Surface	Partner	Opponents	Score
Loss	0–1	Jun 2013	USA F14, Innisbrook	Futures	Clay	(United States) Sekou Bangoura	(El Salvador) Marcelo Arévalo (Brazil) Roberto Maytín	6–3, 4–6, [7–10]
Win	1–1	Apr 2014	USA F11, Little Rock	Futures	Hard	(United States) Jean-Yves Aubone	(United States) Kyle Mcmorrow (South Africa) Tucker Vorster	6–2, 6–4
Win	2–1	Jun 2014	USA F15, Tulsa	Futures	Hard	(United States) Dennis Novikov	(United States) Jared Donaldson (Libya) Fares Gosea	7–6^{(7–5)}, 6–3
Win	3–1	Dec 2014	Mexico F15, Merida	Futures	Hard	(Canada) Philip Bester	(South Africa) Dean O'Brien (Colombia) Juan Carlos Spir	4–6, 7–6^{(7–5)}, [12–10]
Win	4–1	Jan 2015	USA F4, Long Beach	Futures	Hard	(United States) Nicolas Meister	(United States) Dennis Novikov (Bulgaria) Dimitar Kutrovsky	6–3, 6–2
Loss	4–2	Apr 2015	USA F13, Little Rock	Futures	Hard	(United States) Matthew Seeberger	(South Africa) Keith-Patrick Crowley (Mexico) Hans Hach	3–6, 6–1, [7–10]
Win	5–2	May 2015	Nigeria F1, Abuja	Futures	Hard	(United States) Deiton Baughman	(India) Jeevan Nedunchezhiyan (Croatia) Matija Pecotić	6–1, 6–4
Loss	5–3	Sep 2015	Columbus, United States	Challenger	Hard	(United States) Mitchell Krueger	(United States) Chase Buchanan (Slovenia) Blaž Rola	4–6, 6–4, [17–19]
Win	6–3	Oct 2015	USA F29, Mansfield	Futures	Hard	(Mexico) Hans Hach	(United Kingdom) Liam Broady (Australia) Ashley Fisher	7–5, 6–3
Win	7–3	Dec 2015	USA F35, Tallahassee	Futures	Hard	(United States) Nicolas Meister	(Mexico) Daniel Gsrza (Mexico) Tigre Hank	6–3, 7–5
Win	8–3	Feb 2016	Dallas, United States	Challenger	Hard	(United States) Nicolas Meister	(United States) Sekou Bangoura (South Africa) Dean O'Brien	6–1, 6–1
Win	9–3	Mar 2016	USA F11, Calabasas	Futures	Hard	(United States) Nicolas Meister	(Switzerland) Henri Laaksonen (Czech Republic) Marek Michalička	4–6, 6–2, [10–3]
Loss	9–4	Jul 2016	USA F23, Wichita	Futures	Hard	(United States) Nicolas Meister	(United States) Sekou Bangoura (Barbados) Darian King	2–6, 3–6
Loss	9–5	Oct 2016	Fairfield, United States	Challenger	Hard	(United States) Sekou Bangoura	(United States) Brian Baker (United States) Mackenzie McDonald	3–6, 4–6
Loss	9–6	Aug 2017	Lexington, United States	Challenger	Hard	(France) Tom Jomby	(Australia) Alex Bolt (Australia) Max Purcell	5–7, 4–6
