= 2012 Nielsen Pro Tennis Championship – Singles =

Singles
- 2012 Nielsen Pro Tennis Championship

Final
- Champion: (Australia) John-Patrick Smith
- Runner-up: (Lithuania) Ričardas Berankis
- Score: 3–6, 6–3, 7–6^{(7–3)}

Events
Singles	Doubles
← 2011 ·	Nielsen Pro Tennis Championship	· 2013 →

James Blake was the defending champion but decided not to participate. John-Patrick Smith won the title, defeating Ričardas Berankis 3–6, 6–3, 7–6^{(7–3)} in the final.

== Seeds ==
1. (Germany) Benjamin Becker (first round)
2. (United States) Ryan Sweeting (semifinals)
3. (United States) Bobby Reynolds (second round)
4. (Switzerland) Marco Chiudinelli (quarterfinals)
5. (South Africa) Rik de Voest (first round, retired because of fatigue)
6. (Ukraine) Sergei Bubka (semifinals)
7. (Lithuania) Ričardas Berankis (final)
8. (Thailand) Danai Udomchoke (quarterfinals)

== Draw ==
=== Key ===
- Q = Qualifier
- WC = Wild card
- LL = Lucky loser
- Alt = Alternate
- SE = Special exempt
- PR = Protected ranking
- ITF = ITF entry
- JE = Junior exempt
- w/o = Walkover
- r = Retired
- d = Defaulted
- SR = Special ranking

=== Finals ===
Semifinals
6	(Ukraine) Sergei Bubka	6	1	4
Q	(Australia) John-Patrick Smith	2	6	6
7/Alt	(Lithuania) Ričardas Berankis	7^{7}	6
2	(United States) Ryan Sweeting	6^{2}	4

Final
Q	(Australia) John-Patrick Smith	3	6	7^{7}
7/Alt	(Lithuania) Ričardas Berankis	6	3	6^{3}

=== Top half ===
First round
1	(Germany) B Becker	1	4
(United States) T Sandgren	6	6
(Australia) G Jones	6^{4}	4
Q	(Croatia) Ante Pavić	7^{7}	6
(Israel) A Weintraub	0	4
WC	(United States) B Klahn	6	6
(Moldova) R Borvanov	3	4
6	(Ukraine) S Bubka	6	6
3	(United States) B Reynolds	7^{7}	6^{8}	6
(France) Charles-Antoine Brézac	6^{2}	7^{10}	4
(Australia) M Reid	3	2
Q	(Australia) J-P Smith	6	6
(Lithuania) L Grigelis	6^{4}	1
Alt	(Russia) M Ledovskikh	7^{7}	6
(United States) R Williams	6	3
5	(South Africa) R de Voest	1	1^{r}

Second round
(United States) T Sandgren	6	6
Q	(Croatia) Ante Pavić	4	3
WC	(United States) B Klahn	3	4
6	(Ukraine) S Bubka	6	6
3	(United States) B Reynolds	3	4
Q	(Australia) J-P Smith	6	6
Alt	(Russia) M Ledovskikh	6	6
(United States) R Williams	1	4

Quarterfinals
(United States) T Sandgren	4	4
6	(Ukraine) S Bubka	6	6
Q	(Australia) J-P Smith	6	1
Alt	(Russia) M Ledovskikh	2	0^{r}

Semifinals
6	(Ukraine) S Bubka	6	1	4
Q	(Australia) J-P Smith	2	6	6

=== Bottom half ===
First round
7/Alt	(Lithuania) R Berankis	6	6
(Chinese Taipei) J Wang	4	3
WC	(United States) Mitchell Frank	6	6
Q	(United States) J Dadamo	4	2
(United States) M Yani	6	6^{6}	4
WC	(United States) Dennis Nevolo	1	7^{8}	6
WC	(United States) B Strode	1	4
4	(Switzerland) M Chiudinelli	6	6
8	(Thailand) D Udomchoke	6	6
(Canada) P-L Duclos	0	4
Q	(Slovenia) L Gregorc	6	3	1
(United States) T Smyczek	4	6	6
(United States) A Kuznetsov	6	3	7^{7}
(Australia) J Duckworth	2	6	6^{2}
(Australia) B Mitchell	1	2
2	(United States) R Sweeting	6	6

Second round
7/Alt	(Lithuania) R Berankis	6^{3}	6	7
WC	(United States) Mitchell Frank	7^{7}	3	5
WC	(United States) Dennis Nevolo	7^{9}	3	2
4	(Switzerland) M Chiudinelli	6^{7}	6	6
8	(Thailand) D Udomchoke	6	6
(United States) T Smyczek	4	0
(United States) A Kuznetsov	3	3
2	(United States) R Sweeting	6	6

Quarterfinals
7/Alt	(Lithuania) R Berankis	6	4	6
4	(Switzerland) M Chiudinelli	4	6	3
8	(Thailand) D Udomchoke	1	2
2	(United States) R Sweeting	6	6

Semifinals
7/Alt	(Lithuania) R Berankis	7^{7}	6
2	(United States) R Sweeting	6^{2}	4
