= 2017 Nielsen Pro Tennis Championship – Singles =

Singles
- 2017 Nielsen Pro Tennis Championship

Final
- Champion: (Japan) Akira Santillan
- Runner-up: (India) Ramkumar Ramanathan
- Score: 7–6^{(7–1)}, 6–2

Events
Singles	Doubles
← 2016 ·	Nielsen Pro Tennis Championship	· 2018 →

Yoshihito Nishioka was the defending champion but chose not to defend his title.

Akira Santillan won the title after defeating Ramkumar Ramanathan 7–6^{(7–1)}, 6–2 in the final.

== Seeds ==
1. (United States) Tennys Sandgren (quarterfinals)
2. (United States) Taylor Fritz (second round)
3. (United States) Dennis Novikov (first round)
4. (Switzerland) Marco Chiudinelli (first round)
5. (India) Ramkumar Ramanathan (final)
6. (United States) Michael Mmoh (second round)
7. (United States) Mitchell Krueger (second round)
8. (United States) Denis Kudla (first round)

== Draw ==
=== Key ===
- Q = Qualifier
- WC = Wild card
- LL = Lucky loser
- Alt = Alternate
- SE = Special exempt
- PR = Protected ranking
- ITF = ITF entry
- JE = Junior exempt
- w/o = Walkover
- r = Retired
- d = Defaulted
- SR = Special ranking

=== Finals ===
Semifinals
(Germany) Matthias Bachinger	4	6	4
(Japan) Akira Santillan	6	4	6
5	(India) Ramkumar Ramanathan	4	6	6
(United States) Tommy Paul	6	3	2

Final
(Japan) Akira Santillan	7^{7}	6
5	(India) Ramkumar Ramanathan	6^{1}	2

=== Top half ===
First round
1	(United States) T Sandgren	7^{7}	7
(United States) A Krajicek	6^{5}	5
(Australia) O Jasika	4	6	6
(United States) Jared Hiltzik	6	3	2
WC	(United States) C Eubanks	3	7	3
(Germany) M Bachinger	6	5	6
Alt	(Australia) A Bolt	2	4
6	(United States) M Mmoh	6	6
3	(United States) D Novikov	2	4
Q	(United States) Dennis Nevolo	6	6
(Australia) L Saville	2	6	7
WC	(United States) S Kirchheimer	6	4	5
Alt	(Indonesia) C Rungkat	6^{3}	0
PR	(United States) K King	7^{7}	6
(Japan) A Santillan	6	6
8	(United States) D Kudla	4	3

Second round
1	(United States) T Sandgren	6	6
(Australia) O Jasika	2	1
(Germany) M Bachinger	6	6
6	(United States) M Mmoh	1	3
Q	(United States) D Nevolo	6	7^{7}
(Australia) L Saville	4	6^{3}
PR	(United States) K King	4	3
(Japan) A Santillan	6	6

Quarterfinals
1	(United States) T Sandgren	5	4
(Germany) M Bachinger	7	6
Q	(United States) D Nevolo	4	1
(Japan) A Santillan	6	6

Semifinals
(Germany) M Bachinger	4	6	4
(Japan) A Santillan	6	4	6

=== Bottom half ===
First round
5	(India) R Ramanathan	3	7^{7}	7^{11}
PR	(United States) B Klahn	6	6^{4}	6^{9}
(Australia) A Whittington	5	6	3
WC	(United States) JC Aragone	7	3	6
Q	(United States) Aron Hiltzik	6	4	4
Q	(United States) Logan Smith	4	6	6
(Germany) D Köpfer	3	6	6
4	(Switzerland) M Chiudinelli	6	3	0
7	(United States) M Krueger	6	6
(Australia) M Matosevic	4	2
Q	(United States) Ma Redlicki	6	7
WC	(United States) T Fawcett	2	5
(Australia) M Ebden	6^{2}	1
(United States) T Paul	7^{7}	6
(Republic of Ireland) J McGee	4	3
2	(United States) T Fritz	6	6

Second round
5	(India) R Ramanathan	7	6
WC	(United States) JC Aragone	5	2
Q	(United States) L Smith	2	2
(Germany) D Köpfer	6	6
7	(United States) M Krueger	6^{2}	6	3
Q	(United States) Ma Redlicki	7^{7}	3	6
(United States) T Paul	7^{9}	7
2	(United States) T Fritz	6^{7}	5

Quarterfinals
5	(India) R Ramanathan	6	6
(Germany) D Köpfer	4	3
Q	(United States) Ma Redlicki	4	2
(United States) T Paul	6	6

Semifinals
5	(India) R Ramanathan	4	6	6
(United States) T Paul	6	3	2
