= 2014 Nielsen Pro Tennis Championship – Singles =

Singles
- 2014 Nielsen Pro Tennis Championship

Final
- Champion: (United States) Denis Kudla
- Runner-up: (Uzbekistan) Farrukh Dustov
- Score: 6–2, 6–2

Events
Singles	Doubles
- Nielsen Pro Tennis Championship

Jack Sock was the defending champion but decided not to participate.

Denis Kudla won the title, beating Farrukh Dustov 6–2, 6–2.

== Seeds ==
1. (United States) Michael Russell (second round)
2. (United States) Tim Smyczek (quarterfinals)
3. (Russia) Evgeny Donskoy (second round)
4. (Tunisia) Malek Jaziri (second round)
5. (Australia) Sam Groth (first round)
6. (India) Somdev Devvarman (second round)
7. (United States) Denis Kudla (champion)
8. (Lithuania) Ričardas Berankis (first round)

== Draw ==
Key

- Q = Qualifier
- WC = Wild card
- LL = Lucky loser
- Alt = Alternate
- ITF = ITF entry
- PR = Protected ranking
- SR = Special ranking
- SE = Special exempt
- JE = Junior exempt
- JR = Junior Accelerator Programme entrant
- CO = College Accelerator Programme entrant
- NG = Next Gen Accelerator Program entrant
- w/o = Walkover
- r = Retired
- d = Defaulted

=== Finals ===
Semifinals
(Uzbekistan) Farrukh Dustov	6	6
Q	(United States) Mackenzie McDonald	4	3
(Australia) John-Patrick Smith	6	5	6^{4}
7	(United States) Denis Kudla	2	7	7^{7}

Final
(Uzbekistan) Farrukh Dustov	2	2
7	(United States) Denis Kudla	6	6

=== Top half ===
First round
1	(United States) M Russell	6	6
Q	(United States) R Schneider	1	0
(Australia) T Kokkinakis	6^{5}	6^{4}
(Uzbekistan) F Dustov	7^{7}	7^{7}
WC	(United States) M Giron	6^{5}	6^{5}
(United States) A Krajicek	7^{7}	7^{7}
WC	(United States) Jared Hiltzik	4	2
6	(India) S Devvarman	6	6
3	(Russia) E Donskoy	6	6
(Australia) L Saville	1	2
(Switzerland) A Bossel	3	6	7^{7}
(United States) K King	6	2	6^{3}
(Zimbabwe) T Garanganja	6	3	6
(India) S Singh	0	6	2
Q	(United States) M McDonald	5	7^{10}	6
5	(Australia) S Groth	7	6^{8}	3

Second round
1	(United States) M Russell	3	2
(Uzbekistan) F Dustov	6	6
(United States) A Krajicek	6	6
6	(India) S Devvarman	3	4
3	(Russia) E Donskoy	6^{4}	6	1
(Switzerland) A Bossel	7^{7}	1	6
(Zimbabwe) T Garanganja	2	5
Q	(United States) M McDonald	6	7

Quarterfinals
(Uzbekistan) F Dustov	5	6	7
(United States) A Krajicek	7	3	5
(Switzerland) A Bossel	3	4
Q	(United States) M McDonald	6	6

Semifinals
(Uzbekistan) F Dustov	6	6
Q	(United States) M McDonald	4	3

=== Bottom half ===
First round
8	(Lithuania) R Berankis	6^{5}	4
(Ukraine) I Marchenko	7^{7}	6
(United States) J Jenkins	6^{5}	4
LL	(United States) J Dadamo	7^{7}	6
(Australia) J-P Smith	6^{4}	6	6
Q	(United States) Dennis Nevolo	7^{7}	4	3
(New Zealand) M Venus	5	6	4
4	(Tunisia) M Jaziri	7	2	6
7	(United States) D Kudla	6	6
(United States) J Jung	4	4
Q	(United States) E Quigley	2	6	6
WC	(United States) E King	6	3	0
(Republic of Ireland) J McGee	6	6
WC	(United States) R Sarmiento	4	2
(United States) M Krueger	6	4	1
2	(United States) T Smyczek	3	6	6

Second round
(Ukraine) I Marchenko	6	7
LL	(United States) J Dadamo	2	5
(Australia) J-P Smith	7^{7}	6
4	(Tunisia) M Jaziri	6^{4}	0
7	(United States) D Kudla	7	4	6
Q	(United States) E Quigley	5	6	3
(Republic of Ireland) J McGee	6^{9}	5
2	(United States) T Smyczek	7^{11}	7

Quarterfinals
(Ukraine) I Marchenko	6^{5}	3
(Australia) J-P Smith	7^{7}	6
7	(United States) D Kudla	6	6
2	(United States) T Smyczek	3	2

Semifinals
(Australia) J-P Smith	6	5	6^{4}
7	(United States) D Kudla	2	7	7^{7}
