= 2012 Nielsen Pro Tennis Championship – Doubles =

Doubles
- 2012 Nielsen Pro Tennis Championship

Final
- Champions: (United States) Devin Britton (United States) Jeff Dadamo
- Runners-up: (Australia) John Peers (Australia) John-Patrick Smith
- Score: 1–6, 6–2, [10–6]

Events
| Singles | Doubles |
| ← 2011 · | Nielsen Pro Tennis Championship | · 2013 → |

Treat Conrad Huey and Bobby Reynolds were the defending champions but Huey decided not to participate.
Reynolds played alongside Rik de Voest but they were eliminated in the first round.
Devin Britton and Jeff Dadamo won the final 1–6, 6–2, [10–6] against John Peers and John-Patrick Smith.

== Seeds ==
1. (Australia) John Peers / (Australia) John-Patrick Smith (final)
2. (South Africa) Rik de Voest / (United States) Bobby Reynolds (first round)
3. (Thailand) Danai Udomchoke / (Chinese Taipei) Jimmy Wang (quarterfinals, withdrew)
4. (Canada) Pierre-Ludovic Duclos / (United States) Alex Kuznetsov (first round)

== Draw ==
=== Key ===
- Q = Qualifier
- WC = Wild card
- LL = Lucky loser
- Alt = Alternate
- SE = Special exempt
- PR = Protected ranking
- ITF = ITF entry
- JE = Junior exempt
- w/o = Walkover
- r = Retired
- d = Defaulted
- SR = Special ranking

=== Draw ===
First round
1 | (Australia) J Peers (Australia) J-P Smith | w/o
(Australia) C Ball (Australia) M Reid
(Ukraine) S Bubka (France) O Morel | 6^{6} | 2
(Moldova) R Borvanov (Lithuania) L Grigelis | 7^{8} | 6
4 | (Canada) P-L Duclos (United States) A Kuznetsov | 6^{5} | 4
WC | (United States) Mitchell Frank (United States) B Klahn | 7^{7} | 6
(Switzerland) Adrien Bossel (France) Charles-Antoine Brézac | 5 | 6 | [10]
(United States) Dennis Nevolo (United States) Eric Quigley | 7 | 1 | [7]
(Australia) J Duckworth (Australia) G Jones | 2 | 2
(United States) Tennys Sandgren (United States) R Williams | 6 | 6
WC | (United States) Jared Hiltzik (United States) Brian Page, Jr. | 1 | 1
3 | (Thailand) D Udomchoke (Chinese Taipei) J Wang | 6 | 6
(New Zealand) D King-Turner (Croatia) Ante Pavić | 6 | 2 | [10]
(Lithuania) R Berankis (Israel) A Weintraub | 0 | 6 | [12]
(United States) D Britton (United States) J Dadamo | 7^{12} | 7^{9}
2 | (South Africa) R de Voest (United States) B Reynolds | 6^{10} | 6^{7}

Quarterfinals
1 | (Australia) J Peers (Australia) J-P Smith | 6 | 6
(Moldova) R Borvanov (Lithuania) L Grigelis | 2 | 1
WC | (United States) Mitchell Frank (United States) B Klahn | 6 | 6
(Switzerland) Adrien Bossel (France) Charles-Antoine Brézac | 3 | 4
(United States) Tennys Sandgren (United States) R Williams | w/o
3 | (Thailand) D Udomchoke (Chinese Taipei) J Wang
(Lithuania) R Berankis (Israel) A Weintraub | 3 | 5
(United States) D Britton (United States) J Dadamo | 6 | 7

Semifinals
1 | (Australia) J Peers (Australia) J-P Smith | w/o
WC | (United States) Mitchell Frank (United States) B Klahn
(United States) Tennys Sandgren (United States) R Williams | 6 | 1 | [9]
(United States) D Britton (United States) J Dadamo | 4 | 6 | [11]

Final
1 | (Australia) J Peers (Australia) J-P Smith | 6 | 2 | [6]
(United States) D Britton (United States) J Dadamo | 1 | 6 | [10]
