= 2012 Nielsen Pro Tennis Championship =

- Date: 2–8 July
- Edition: 21st
- Surface: Hard
- Location: Winnetka, Illinois, United States

Champions

Singles
- (Australia) John-Patrick Smith

Doubles
- (United States) Devin Britton / (United States) Jeff Dadamo
← 2011 ·	Nielsen Pro Tennis Championship	· 2013 →

The 2012 Nielsen Pro Tennis Championship was a professional tennis tournament played on hard courts. It was the 21st edition of the tournament which was part of the 2012 ATP Challenger Tour. It took place in Winnetka, Illinois, between 2 and 8 July 2012.

== Singles main-draw entrants ==
=== Seeds ===
Country	Player	Rank^{1}	Seed
GER	Benjamin Becker	124	1
USA	Ryan Sweeting	130	2
USA	Bobby Reynolds	132	3
SUI	Marco Chiudinelli	134	4
RSA	Rik de Voest	142	5
UKR	Sergei Bubka	167	6
LTU	Ričardas Berankis	169	7
THA	Danai Udomchoke	171	8

- ^{1} Rankings are as of June 25, 2012.

=== Other entrants ===
The following players received wildcards into the singles main draw:

- (United States) Mitchell Frank
- (United States) Bradley Klahn
- (United States) Dennis Nevolo
- (United States) Blake Strode

The following players received entry as an alternate into the singles main draw:

- (Lithuania) Ričardas Berankis

The following players received entry from the qualifying draw:

- (United States) Jeff Dadamo
- (Slovenia) Luka Gregorc
- (Croatia) Ante Pavić
- (Australia) John-Patrick Smith

== Champions ==
=== Singles ===
- (Australia) John-Patrick Smith def. (Lithuania) Ričardas Berankis, 3–6, 6–3, 7–6^{(7–3)}

=== Doubles ===
- (United States) Devin Britton / (United States) Jeff Dadamo def. (Australia) John Peers / (Australia) John-Patrick Smith, 1–6, 6–2, [10–6]
