= 2010 Nielsen Pro Tennis Championship – Doubles =

Doubles
- 2010 Nielsen Pro Tennis Championship

Final
- Champions: (United States) Ryler DeHeart (Canada) Pierre-Ludovic Duclos
- Runners-up: (South Africa) Rik de Voest (India) Somdev Devvarman
- Score: 7–6(4), 4–6, [10–8]

Events
Singles	Doubles
← 2009 ·	Nielsen Pro Tennis Championship	· 2011 →

Carsten Ball and Travis Rettenmaier were the defending champions; however, they competed in Wimbledon instead.
Ryler DeHeart and Pierre-Ludovic Duclos won in the final 7–6(4), 4–6, [10–8], against Rik de Voest and Somdev Devvarman.

== Seeds ==
1. (Argentina) Brian Dabul / (France) Édouard Roger-Vasselin (semifinals)
2. (United States) Lester Cook / (United States) David Martin (semifinals)
3. (United States) Ryler DeHeart / (Canada) Pierre-Ludovic Duclos (champions)
4. (South Africa) Rik de Voest / (India) Somdev Devvarman (final)

== Main draw ==
=== Key ===
- Q = Qualifier
- WC = Wild card
- LL = Lucky loser
- Alt = Alternate
- SE = Special exempt
- PR = Protected ranking
- ITF = ITF entry
- JE = Junior exempt
- w/o = Walkover
- r = Retired
- d = Defaulted
- SR = Special ranking

=== Draw ===
First round
1	(Argentina) B Dabul (France) É Roger-Vasselin	6	6
(South Africa) R Klaasen (South Africa) I van der Merwe	2	3
(Spain) A Brugués-Davi (Dominican Republic) V Estrella	w/o
(Austria) A Peya (Germany) B Phau
4	(South Africa) R de Voest (India) S Devvarman	6	6
(Australia) A Hubble (Brazil) M Torres	3	3
WC	(United States) R Harrison (United States) A Krajicek	3	4
(United States) A Kuznetsov (United States) B Reynolds	6	6
(Ukraine) S Bubka (Canada) M Raonic	6	6
WC	(United States) S Barnett (United States) K Kim	2	3
WC	(United States) P Simmonds (United States) J Witten	3	1
3	(United States) R DeHeart (Canada) P-L Duclos	6	6
(Germany) A Begemann (Germany) S Stadler	6	5	[2]
(United States) N Monroe (Russia) A Sitak	4	7	[10]
(United States) JP Fruttero (India) H Mankad	6^{4}	3
2	(United States) L Cook (United States) D Martin	7	6

Quarterfinals
1	(Argentina) B Dabul (France) É Roger-Vasselin	6	6
(Austria) A Peya (Germany) B Phau	1	3
4	(South Africa) R de Voest (India) S Devvarman	6	6
(United States) A Kuznetsov (United States) B Reynolds	3	2
(Ukraine) S Bubka (Canada) M Raonic	2	2
3	(United States) R DeHeart (Canada) P-L Duclos	6	6
(United States) N Monroe (Russia) A Sitak	6	2	[8]
2	(United States) L Cook (United States) D Martin	1	6	[10]

Semifinals
1	(Argentina) B Dabul (France) É Roger-Vasselin	6	3	[8]
4	(South Africa) R de Voest (India) S Devvarman	4	6	[10]
3	(United States) R DeHeart (Canada) P-L Duclos	6	6
2	(United States) L Cook (United States) D Martin	3	2

Finals
4	(South Africa) R de Voest (India) S Devvarman	6^{4}	6	[8]
3	(United States) R DeHeart (Canada) P-L Duclos	7	4	[10]
