= 2009 Nielsen Pro Tennis Championship – Singles =

Singles
- 2009 Nielsen Pro Tennis Championship

Final
- Champion: (United States) Alex Kuznetsov
- Runner-up: (United States) Tim Smyczek
- Score: 6–4, 7–6(1)

Events
Singles	Doubles
← 2008 ·	Nielsen Pro Tennis Championship	· 2010 →

Rajeev Ram was the defending champion; however, he lost to Kuznetsov in the second round. Alex Kuznetsov won in the final 6–4, 7–6(1), against Tim Smyczek

== Seeds ==
1. (United States) John Isner (first round)
2. (United States) Vince Spadea (first round)
3. (United States) Brendan Evans (first round)
4. (United States) Donald Young (quarterfinals)
5. (United States) Rajeev Ram (second round)
6. (Germany) Simon Stadler (first round)
7. (United States) Ryan Sweeting (first round)
8. (Italy) Andrea Stoppini (first round)

== Draw ==
=== Key ===
- Q = Qualifier
- WC = Wild card
- LL = Lucky loser
- Alt = Alternate
- SE = Special exempt
- PR = Protected ranking
- ITF = ITF entry
- JE = Junior exempt
- w/o = Walkover
- r = Retired
- d = Defaulted
- SR = Special ranking

=== Final four ===
Semifinals
(United States) Ryler DeHeart	6	2	6^{1}
Q	(United States) Tim Smyczek	1	6	7
(Denmark) Kristian Pless	4	6^{6}
Q	(United States) Alex Kuznetsov	6	7

Final
Q	(United States) Tim Smyczek	4	6^{1}
Q	(United States) Alex Kuznetsov	6	7

=== Top half ===
First round
1	(United States) J Isner	4	6^{4}
(United States) R DeHeart	6	7
(Brazil) R Mello	5	6^{4}
(Australia) C Ball	7	7
(United States) L Cook	3	4
(Israel) N Okun	6	6
(United States) S Jenkins	7	3	7
8	(Italy) A Stoppini	6^{5}	6	6^{6}
4	(United States) D Young	6	6
WC	(United States) P Simmonds	3	3
WC	(Australia) S Groth	4	5
Q	(New Zealand) G.D. Jones	6	7
(South Africa) I van der Merwe	7	6^{5}	4
(Venezuela) J de Armas	6^{3}	7	6
Q	(United States) T Smyczek	1	6	6
6	(Germany) S Stadler	6	4	1

Second round
(United States) R DeHeart	6	6
(Australia) C Ball	1	2
(Israel) N Okun	6	3	4
(United States) S Jenkins	2	6	6
4	(United States) D Young	6	6
Q	(New Zealand) G.D. Jones	3	3
(Venezuela) J de Armas	2	3
Q	(United States) T Smyczek	6	6

Quarterfinals
(United States) R DeHeart	7	6
(United States) S Jenkins	6^{4}	2
4	(United States) D Young	2	6^{3}
Q	(United States) T Smyczek	6	7

Semifinals
(United States) R DeHeart	6	2	6^{1}
Q	(United States) T Smyczek	1	6	7

=== Bottom half ===
First round
7	(United States) R Sweeting	3	2
(United States) S Warburg	6	6
Q	(Mexico) J-M Elizondo	1	2
(Denmark) K Pless	6	6
(United States) M Yani	6	6
(United States) E Nunez	2	3
(Slovenia) L Gregorc	7	6
3	(United States) B Evans	5	2
5	(United States) R Ram	6^{6}	6	7
WC	(United States) A Bogomolov Jr.	7	2	5
WC	(United States) D Nevolo	1	2
Q	(United States) A Kuznetsov	6	6
(United States) T Widom	7	6
(Australia) N Lindahl	5	1
(South Africa) F Wolmarans	7	6
2	(United States) V Spadea	6^{3}	4

Second round
(United States) S Warburg	w/o
(Denmark) K Pless
(United States) M Yani	4	1
(Slovenia) L Gregorc	6	6
5	(United States) R Ram	4	7	6^{6}
Q	(United States) A Kuznetsov	6	6^{5}	7
(United States) T Widom	6	6
(South Africa) F Wolmarans	4	3

Quarterfinals
(Denmark) K Pless
(Slovenia) L Gregorc	w/o
Q	(United States) A Kuznetsov	6	6
(United States) T Widom	3	2

Semifinals
(Denmark) K Pless	4	6^{6}
Q	(United States) A Kuznetsov	6	7
