= 2013 Nielsen Pro Tennis Championship – Doubles =

Doubles
- 2013 Nielsen Pro Tennis Championship

Final
- Champions: (India) Yuki Bhambri (New Zealand) Michael Venus
- Runners-up: (India) Somdev Devvarman (United States) Jack Sock
- Score: 2–6, 6–2, [10–8]

Events
Singles	Doubles
- Nielsen Pro Tennis Championship

Devin Britton and Jeff Dadamo were defending champions, but Britton decided not to participate.
Dadamo teamed up with Mischa Zverev but lost to Kevin King and Juan Carlos Spir in the first round.
Yuki Bhambri and Michael Venus claimed the title, by beating Somdev Devvarman and Jack Sock 2–6, 6–2, [10–8]

== Seeds ==
1. (United States) James Cerretani / (Australia) Chris Guccione (semifinals)
2. (United States) Austin Krajicek / (United States) Tennys Sandgren (semifinals)
3. (India) Somdev Devvarman / (United States) Jack Sock (final)
4. (Russia) Alex Bogomolov Jr. / (Canada) Érik Chvojka (first round)

== Draw ==
Key

- Q = Qualifier
- WC = Wild card
- LL = Lucky loser
- Alt = Alternate
- ITF = ITF entry
- PR = Protected ranking
- SR = Special ranking
- SE = Special exempt
- JE = Junior exempt
- JR = Junior Accelerator Programme entrant
- CO = College Accelerator Programme entrant
- NG = Next Gen Accelerator Program entrant
- w/o = Walkover
- r = Retired
- d = Defaulted

=== Draw ===
First round
(United States) B Klahn (United States) D Young	6^{5}	4
(Australia) A Feeney (India) S Myneni	7^{7}	6
3	(India) S Devvarman (United States) J Sock	6^{1}	7^{7}	[10]
(United States) S Bangoura (United States) E Quigley	7^{7}	6^{4}	[8]
(United States) Jared Hiltzik (United States) J Jenkins	3	1
(United States) J Jung (United States) E King	6	6
(United States) K King (Colombia) JC Spir	6	6
(United States) J Dadamo (Germany) M Zverev	3	4
(India) Y Bhambri (New Zealand) M Venus	w/o
4	(Russia) A Bogomolov Jr. (Canada) É Chvojka
WC	(United States) Gregory S Andrews (United States) T Fawcett	2	1
(Uzbekistan) F Dustov (Croatia) A Pavić	6	6

Quarterfinals
1	(United States) J Cerretani (Australia) C Guccione	6	6
(Australia) A Feeney (India) S Myeni	4	4
3	(India) S Devvarman (United States) J Sock	6	6
(United States) J Jung (United States) E King	4	4
(United States) K King (Colombia) JC Spir	3	3
(India) Y Bhambri (New Zealand) M Venus	6	6
(Uzbekistan) F Dustov (Croatia) A Pavić	4	5
2	(United States) A Krajicek (United States) T Sandgren	6	7

Semifinals
1	(United States) J Cerretani (Australia) C Guccione	5	6^{1}
3	(India) S Devvarman (United States) J Sock	7	7^{7}
(India) Y Bhambri (New Zealand) M Venus	7^{7}	7^{7}
2	(United States) A Krajicek (United States) T Sandgren	6^{2}	6^{3}

Final
3	(India) S Devvarman (United States) J Sock	6	2	[8]
(India) Y Bhambri (New Zealand) M Venus	2	6	[10]
