= 2011 Nielsen Pro Tennis Championship – Singles =

Singles
- 2011 Nielsen Pro Tennis Championship

Final
- Champion: (United States) James Blake
- Runner-up: (United States) Bobby Reynolds
- Score: 6–3, 6–1

Events
| Singles | Doubles |
| ← 2010 · | Nielsen Pro Tennis Championship | · 2012 → |

Brian Dabul was the defending champion. He lost in the first round to Robby Ginepri. 2nd seed James Blake defeated 5th seed Bobby Reynolds in the all-American final 6–3, 6–1.

== Seeds ==
1. (United States) Michael Russell (quarterfinals)
2. (United States) James Blake (champion)
3. (United States) Donald Young (semifinals)
4. (Japan) Go Soeda (first round)
5. (United States) Bobby Reynolds (final)
6. (Argentina) Brian Dabul (first round)
7. (Chile) Paul Capdeville (quarterfinals)
8. (South Africa) Rik de Voest (semifinals)

== Draw ==
=== Key ===
- Q = Qualifier
- WC = Wild card
- LL = Lucky loser
- Alt = Alternate
- SE = Special exempt
- PR = Protected ranking
- ITF = ITF entry
- JE = Junior exempt
- w/o = Walkover
- r = Retired
- d = Defaulted
- SR = Special ranking

=== Finals ===
Semifinals
5 | (United States) Bobby Reynolds | 6 | 7
3 | (United States) Donald Young | 4 | 5
8 | (South Africa) Rik de Voest | 6 | 5 | 2
2/WC | (United States) James Blake | 4 | 7 | 6

Final
5 | (United States) Bobby Reynolds | 3 | 1
2/WC | (United States) James Blake | 6 | 6

=== Top half ===
First round
1 | (United States) M Russell | 4 | 6 | 6
(United States) N Monroe | 6 | 1 | 1
(Israel) A Weintraub | 7 | 0 | 4
Q | (United States) D Kudla | 5 | 6 | 6
(Canada) V Pospisil | 6 | 6
WC | (United States) Evan King | 4 | 2
Q | (United States) M Shabaz | 6^{2} | 2
5 | (United States) B Reynolds | 7 | 6
3 | (United States) D Young | 6^{0} | 6 | 6
Q | (Slovenia) L Gregorc | 7 | 1 | 1
(Bosnia and Herzegovina) A Delić | 7 | 2 | 4
(Australia) G Jones | 6^{8} | 6 | 6
(South Africa) R Klaasen | 6^{5} | 2
SE | (Canada) P-L Duclos | 7 | 6
WC | (United States) R Ginepri | 6 | 2 | 6
6 | (Argentina) B Dabul | 3 | 6 | 2

Second round
1 | (United States) M Russell | 6 | 6
Q | (United States) D Kudla | 4 | 0
(Canada) V Pospisil | 3 | 6 | 4
5 | (United States) B Reynolds | 6 | 3 | 6
3 | (United States) D Young | 6 | 6
(Australia) G Jones | 1 | 0
SE | (Canada) P-L Duclos | 2 | 2
WC | (United States) R Ginepri | 6 | 6

Quarterfinals
1 | (United States) M Russell | 4 | 0^{r}
5 | (United States) B Reynolds | 6 | 0
3 | (United States) D Young | 5 | 6 | 6
WC | (United States) R Ginepri | 7 | 3 | 3

Semifinals
5 | (United States) B Reynolds | 6 | 7
3 | (United States) D Young | 4 | 5

=== Bottom half ===
First round
8 | (South Africa) R de Voest | 5 | 6 | 6
(Moldova) R Borvanov | 7 | 3 | 2
(United States) A Kuznetsov | 3 | 4
(Germany) A Begemann | 6 | 6
WC | (United States) J Sock | 6 | 6
(United States) Greg Ouellette | 3 | 2
(New Zealand) M Venus | 6^{5} | 6 | 6
4 | (Japan) G Soeda | 7^{7} | 3 | 2
7 | (Chile) P Capdeville | 6 | 6
(United States) J Witten | 3 | 4
(Canada) P Bester | 7 | 6
Q | (United States) B Klahn | 6^{3} | 2
(United States) K Kim | 1 | 4
(Slovakia) I Klec | 6 | 6
(Thailand) D Udomchoke | 3 | 1
2/WC | (United States) J Blake | 6 | 6

Second round
8 | (South Africa) R de Voest | 6 | 6
(Germany) A Begemann | 3 | 2
WC | (United States) J Sock | 2 | 2
(New Zealand) M Venus | 6 | 6
7 | (Chile) P Capdeville | 7 | 7
(Canada) P Bester | 6 | 5
(Slovakia) I Klec | 2 | 2
2/WC | (United States) J Blake | 6 | 6

Quarterfinals
8 | (South Africa) R de Voest | 6 | 6
(New Zealand) M Venus | 1 | 4
7 | (Chile) P Capdeville | 2 | 6 | 1
2/WC | (United States) J Blake | 6 | 4 | 6

Semifinals
8 | (South Africa) R de Voest | 6 | 5 | 2
2/WC | (United States) J Blake | 4 | 7 | 6
