= 2017 Nielsen Pro Tennis Championship =

- Date: 11–16 July
- Edition: 26th
- Surface: Hard
- Location: Winnetka, United States

Champions

Singles
- (Japan) Akira Santillan

Doubles
- (Thailand) Sanchai Ratiwatana / (Indonesia) Christopher Rungkat
← 2016 ·	Nielsen Pro Tennis Championship	· 2018 →

The 2017 Nielsen Pro Tennis Championship was a professional tennis tournament played on hard courts. It was the 26th edition of the tournament which was part of the 2017 ATP Challenger Tour. It took place in Winnetka, Illinois, between 11 and 16 July 2017.

== Singles main-draw entrants ==
=== Seeds ===
Country	Player	Rank^{1}	Seed
USA	Tennys Sandgren	106	1
USA	Taylor Fritz	128	2
USA	Dennis Novikov	175	3
SUI	Marco Chiudinelli	183	4
IND	Ramkumar Ramanathan	184	5
USA	Michael Mmoh	185	6
USA	Mitchell Krueger	189	7
USA	Denis Kudla	191	8

- ^{1} Rankings are as of July 3, 2017.

=== Other entrants ===
The following players received wildcards into the singles main draw:

- (United States) JC Aragone
- (United States) Christopher Eubanks
- (United States) Tom Fawcett
- (United States) Strong Kirchheimer

The following players received entry into the singles main draw using protected rankings:

- (United States) Kevin King
- (United States) Bradley Klahn

The following players received entry into the singles main draw as alternates:

- (Australia) Alex Bolt
- (Indonesia) Christopher Rungkat

The following players received entry from the qualifying draw:

- (United States) Aron Hiltzik
- (United States) Dennis Nevolo
- (United States) Martin Redlicki
- (United States) Logan Smith

== Champions ==
=== Singles ===
- (Japan) Akira Santillan def. (India) Ramkumar Ramanathan 7–6^{(7–1)}, 6–2.

=== Doubles ===
- (Thailand) Sanchai Ratiwatana / (Indonesia) Christopher Rungkat def. (United States) Kevin King / (United States) Bradley Klahn 7–6^{(7–4)}, 6–2.
