= 2009 Nielsen Pro Tennis Championship – Doubles =

Doubles
- 2009 Nielsen Pro Tennis Championship

Final
- Champions: (Australia) Carsten Ball (United States) Travis Rettenmaier
- Runners-up: (United States) Brett Joelson (United States) Ryan Sweeting
- Score: 6–1, 6–2

Events
Singles	Doubles
← 2008 ·	Nielsen Pro Tennis Championship	· 2010 →

Todd Widom and Michael Yani were the defending champions; however, they were eliminated by Ball and Rettenmaier in the semifinal.
Carsten Ball & Travis Rettenmaier defeated Brett Joelson & Ryan Sweeting in the final 6–1, 6–2.

== Seeds ==
1. (Australia) Carsten Ball / (United States) Travis Rettenmaier (champions)
2. (United States) Brendan Evans / (United States) John Isner (quarterfinals)
3. (United States) Todd Widom / (United States) Michael Yani (semifinals)
4. (United States) Alex Bogomolov Jr. / (Israel) Noam Okun (first round)

== Draw ==
=== Key ===
- Q = Qualifier
- WC = Wild card
- LL = Lucky loser
- Alt = Alternate
- SE = Special exempt
- PR = Protected ranking
- ITF = ITF entry
- JE = Junior exempt
- w/o = Walkover
- r = Retired
- d = Defaulted
- SR = Special ranking

=== Draw ===
First round
1	(Australia) C Ball (United States) T Rettenmaier	6	5	[10]
(United States) R DeHeart (South Africa) I van der Merwe	3	7	[1]
(United States) N Monroe (United States) D Young	6	6
(Canada) F Niemeyer (Denmark) K Pless	4	3
3	(United States) T Widom (United States) M Yani	7	4	[10]
(United States) S Jenkins (India) H Mankad	5	6	[7]
(New Zealand) G.D. Jones (United States) R Rowe	3	2
WC	(Mexico) J-M Elizondo (United States) JP Fruttero	6	6
(Venezuela) J de Armas (United States) E Nunez	6	6
(United States) L Cook (United States) P Simmonds	3	2
WC	(United States) M Allare (United States) J Kronauge	6	6
4	(United States) A Bogomolov Jr. (Israel) N Okun	3	2
(Australia) N Lindahl (Australia) M Reid	4	6	[5]
WC	(United States) B Joelson (United States) R Sweeting	6	4	[10]
(United States) A Kuznetsov (United States) T Smyczek	6	2	[8]
2	(United States) B Evans (United States) J Isner	3	6	[10]

Quarterfinals
1	(Australia) C Ball (United States) T Rettenmaier	6	6
(United States) N Monroe (United States) D Young	4	4
3	(United States) T Widom (United States) M Yani	4	6	[10]
WC	(Mexico) J-M Elizondo (United States) JP Fruttero	6	2	[6]
(Venezuela) J de Armas (United States) E Nunez	7	7
WC	(United States) M Allare (United States) J Kronauge	6^{5}	6^{6}
WC	(United States) B Joelson (United States) R Sweeting	6	6
2	(United States) B Evans (United States) J Isner	4	1

Semifinals
1	(Australia) C Ball (United States) T Rettenmaier	6	6
3	(United States) T Widom (United States) M Yani	1	2
(Venezuela) J de Armas (United States) E Nunez	2	7	[10]
WC	(United States) B Joelson (United States) R Sweeting	6	6^{9}	[12]

Finals
1	(Australia) C Ball (United States) T Rettenmaier	6	6
WC	(United States) B Joelson (United States) R Sweeting	1	2
