= 2014 Nielsen Pro Tennis Championship – Doubles =

Doubles
- 2014 Nielsen Pro Tennis Championship

Final
- Champions: (Australia) Thanasi Kokkinakis (United States) Denis Kudla
- Runners-up: (United States) Evan King (United States) Raymond Sarmiento
- Score: 6–2, 7–6^{(7–4)}

Events
Singles	Doubles
- Nielsen Pro Tennis Championship

Yuki Bhambri and Michael Venus were defending champions, but Bhambri decided not to participate.
Venus teamed up with Luke Saville, but they were defeated by Thanasi Kokkinakis and Denis Kudla in the semifinals.
Thanasi Kokkinakis and Denis Kudla won the title, beating Evan King and Raymond Sarmiento 6–2, 7–6^{(7–4)}.

== Seeds ==
1. (Thailand) Sanchai Ratiwatana / (Thailand) Sonchat Ratiwatana (quarterfinals)
2. (India) Somdev Devvarman / (India) Sanam Singh (first round)
3. (Tunisia) Malek Jaziri / (Ukraine) Illya Marchenko (first round, withdrew)
4. (United States) Jarmere Jenkins / (United States) Mitchell Krueger (quarterfinals)

== Draw ==
Key

- Q = Qualifier
- WC = Wild card
- LL = Lucky loser
- Alt = Alternate
- ITF = ITF entry
- PR = Protected ranking
- SR = Special ranking
- SE = Special exempt
- JE = Junior exempt
- JR = Junior Accelerator Programme entrant
- CO = College Accelerator Programme entrant
- NG = Next Gen Accelerator Program entrant
- w/o = Walkover
- r = Retired
- d = Defaulted

=== Draw ===
First round
1	(Thailand) Sa Ratiwatana (Thailand) So Ratiwatana	3	6	[11]
WC	(United States) T Fawcett (United States) Brian Page, Jr.	6	4	[9]
(United States) M McDonald (United States) M Redlicki	7	6
(United States) Aron Hiltzik (United States) Jared Hiltzik	5	1
3	(Tunisia) M Jaziri (Ukraine) I Marchenko	w/o
(United States) S Bangoura (United States) J Jung
(United States) E King (United States) R Sarmiento	6	6
(United States) Andrew Carter (United States) E Quigley	3	2
(Australia) L Saville (New Zealand) M Venus	6	6
(United States) Mihir Kumar (United States) Samuel Shropshire	3	4
WC	(United States) Felix Corwin (United States) Drew Lied	2	3
4	(United States) J Jenkins (United States) M Krueger	6	6
WC	(Norway) Fedor Baev (United States) Konrad Zieba	1	3
(Lithuania) R Berankis (Russia) E Donskoy	6	6
(Australia) T Kokkinakis (United States) D Kudla	6	7^{9}
2	(India) S Devvarman (India) S Singh	1	6^{7}

Quarterfinals
1	(Thailand) Sa Ratiwatana (Thailand) So Ratiwatana	3	7	[6]
(United States) M McDonald (United States) M Redlicki	6	5	[10]
(United States) S Bangoura (United States) J Jung	w/o
(United States) E King (United States) R Sarmiento
(Australia) L Saville (New Zealand) M Venus	6	6
4	(United States) J Jenkins (United States) M Krueger	3	2
(Lithuania) R Berankis (Russia) E Donskoy	3	4
(Australia) T Kokkinakis (United States) D Kudla	6	6

Semifinals
(United States) M McDonald (United States) M Redlicki	2	6	[7]
(United States) E King (United States) R Sarmiento	6	3	[10]
(Australia) L Saville (New Zealand) M Venus	6^{2}	5
(Australia) T Kokkinakis (United States) D Kudla	7^{7}	7

Final
(United States) E King (United States) R Sarmiento	2	6^{4}
(Australia) T Kokkinakis (United States) D Kudla	6	7^{7}
