= 2013 Nielsen Pro Tennis Championship – Singles =

Singles
- 2013 Nielsen Pro Tennis Championship

Final
- Champion: (United States) Jack Sock
- Runner-up: (United States) Bradley Klahn
- Score: 6–4, 6–2

Events
Singles	Doubles
- Nielsen Pro Tennis Championship

John-Patrick Smith was the defending champion but decided not to participate.

Jack Sock won the title, beating Bradley Klahn 6–4, 6–2.

== Seeds ==
1. (Russia) Alex Bogomolov Jr. (semifinals, retired)
2. (United States) Steve Johnson (quarterfinals)
3. (United States) Jack Sock (champion)
4. (United States) Tim Smyczek (quarterfinals)
5. (India) Somdev Devvarman (semifinals)
6. (Germany) Mischa Zverev (quarterfinals, retired)
7. (United States) Donald Young (quarterfinals)
8. (United States) Bradley Klahn (final)

== Draw ==
Key

- Q = Qualifier
- WC = Wild card
- LL = Lucky loser
- Alt = Alternate
- ITF = ITF entry
- PR = Protected ranking
- SR = Special ranking
- SE = Special exempt
- JE = Junior exempt
- JR = Junior Accelerator Programme entrant
- CO = College Accelerator Programme entrant
- NG = Next Gen Accelerator Program entrant
- w/o = Walkover
- r = Retired
- d = Defaulted

=== Finals ===
Semifinals
1	(Russia) Alex Bogomolov Jr.	6	4	1^{r}
8	(United States) Bradley Klahn	4	6	3
3/WC	(United States) Jack Sock	3	6	7^{7}
5	(India) Somdev Devvarman	6	4	6^{5}

Final
8	(United States) Bradley Klahn	4	2
3/WC	(United States) Jack Sock	6	6

=== Top half ===
First round
1	(Russia) A Bogomolov Jr.	6	6
(Canada) É Chvojka	4	3
Alt	(United States) E Quigley	6	2	6
(Switzerland) A Bossel	2	6	4
WC	(United States) E King	5	6	5
(United States) J Jung	7	4	7
(United States) T Sandgren	3	7^{7}	5
6	(Germany) M Zverev	6	6^{5}	7
4	(United States) T Smyczek	6	1	6
(India) Y Bhambri	4	6	1
(Australia) A Feeney	6	5	2
(United States) C Harrison	3	7	6
(United States) R Ginepri	6^{3}	0^{r}
Q	(United States) J Dadamo	7^{7}	3
(Uzbekistan) F Dustov	6	6^{8}	4
8	(United States) B Klahn	3	7^{10}	6

Second round
1	(Russia) A Bogomolov Jr.	6	7
Alt	(United States) E Quigley	4	5
(United States) J Jung	2	3
6	(Germany) M Zverev	6	6
4	(United States) T Smyczek	6	1	6
(United States) C Harrison	3	6	1
Q	(United States) J Dadamo	6^{5}	4
8	(United States) B Klahn	7^{7}	6

Quarterfinals
1	(Russia) A Bogomolov Jr.	6	3
6	(Germany) M Zverev	2	0^{r}
4	(United States) T Smyczek	3	5
8	(United States) B Klahn	6	7

Semifinals
1	(Russia) A Bogomolov Jr.	6	4	1^{r}
8	(United States) B Klahn	4	6	3

=== Bottom half ===
First round
7	(United States) D Young	6	3	6
Q	(Latvia) M Podžus	4	6	2
WC	(United States) J Jenkins	7^{7}	6^{4}	6
Q	(United States) K King	6^{4}	7^{7}	4
(United States) A Krajicek	0	6	6
(United Kingdom) A Bogdanovic	6	3	3
(South Africa) F Wolmarans	2	6^{2}
3/WC	(United States) J Sock	6	7^{7}
5	(India) S Devvarman	6^{7}	6	6
Q	(United States) S Bangoura	7^{9}	3	1
(India) S Myneni	4	6	6
WC	(United States) Dennis Nevolo	6	1	2
(New Zealand) M Venus	6	6
Alt	(Croatia) A Pavić	3	3
Alt	(United States) M McClune	5	5
2	(United States) S Johnson	7	7

Second round
7	(United States) D Young	6	6
WC	(United States) J Jenkins	2	2
(United States) A Krajicek	4	1
3/WC	(United States) J Sock	6	6
5	(India) S Devvarman	6	6
(India) S Myneni	1	2
(New Zealand) M Venus	1	4
2	(United States) S Johnson	6	6

Quarterfinals
7	(United States) D Young	3	4
3/WC	(United States) J Sock	6	6
5	(India) S Devvarman	7	6
2	(United States) S Johnson	5	4

Semifinals
3/WC	(United States) J Sock	3	6	7^{7}
5	(India) S Devvarman	6	4	6^{5}
