= 2018 Nielsen Pro Tennis Championship – Singles =

Singles
- 2018 Nielsen Pro Tennis Championship

Final
- Champion: (Russia) Evgeny Karlovskiy
- Runner-up: (Chinese Taipei) Jason Jung
- Score: 6–3, 6–2

Events
Singles	Doubles
- Nielsen Pro Tennis Championship

Akira Santillan was the defending champion but chose not to defend his title.

Evgeny Karlovskiy won the title after defeating Jason Jung 6–3, 6–2 in the final.

== Seeds ==
1. (United States) Tim Smyczek (first round)
2. (United States) Bjorn Fratangelo (first round)
3. (India) Ramkumar Ramanathan (first round)
4. (Chinese Taipei) Jason Jung (final)
5. (Barbados) Darian King (second round)
6. (United States) Reilly Opelka (first round)
7. (United States) Kevin King (second round)
8. (Egypt) Mohamed Safwat (quarterfinals)

== Draw ==
Key

- Q = Qualifier
- WC = Wild card
- LL = Lucky loser
- Alt = Alternate
- ITF = ITF entry
- PR = Protected ranking
- SR = Special ranking
- SE = Special exempt
- JE = Junior exempt
- JR = Junior Accelerator Programme entrant
- CO = College Accelerator Programme entrant
- NG = Next Gen Accelerator Program entrant
- w/o = Walkover
- r = Retired
- d = Defaulted

=== Finals ===
Semifinals
(Australia) Dayne Kelly	4	2
(Russia) Evgeny Karlovskiy	6	6
4	(Chinese Taipei) Jason Jung	6	6
Q	(United States) Collin Altamirano	2	2

Final
(Russia) Evgeny Karlovskiy	6	6
4	(Chinese Taipei) Jason Jung	3	2

=== Top half ===
First round
1	(United States) T Smyczek	6	6^{7}	4
(United States) T Paul	1	7^{9}	6
Q	(Burundi) GO Iradukunda	5	2
(United States) E King	7	6
WC	(United States) D Thomas	6	3	5
(Australia) D Kelly	4	6	7
(United States) A Sarkissian	6	3	4
7	(United States) K King	2	6	6
3	(India) R Ramanathan	0	4
(Russia) E Karlovskiy	6	6
(United States) E Escobedo	3	7^{7}	6
WC	(United States) Martin Joyce	6	6^{1}	3
WC	(United States) T Fawcett	3	6	7^{7}
(Brazil) K Sell	6	4	6^{4}
PR	(France) Tom Jomby	6	6
6	(United States) R Opelka	4	2

Second round
(United States) T Paul	6	6
(United States) E King	1	2
(Australia) D Kelly	6	6
7	(United States) K King	4	1
(Russia) E Karlovskiy	6	6
(United States) E Escobedo	2	1
WC	(United States) T Fawcett	1	6	4
PR	(France) T Jomby	6	2	6

Quarterfinals
(United States) T Paul	6	6^{5}	2
(Australia) D Kelly	1	7^{7}	6
(Russia) E Karlovskiy	3	6	6
PR	(France) T Jomby	6	4	1

Semifinals
(Australia) D Kelly	4	2
(Russia) E Karlovskiy	6	6

=== Bottom half ===
First round
8	(Egypt) M Safwat	6	6
(Monaco) L Catarina	2	4
Q	(Tunisia) A Dougaz	7^{7}	1	5
PR	(United States) N Meister	6^{5}	6	7
(United States) C Eubanks	7	7
Q	(United States) Ma Redlicki	5	5
WC	(United States) T-S Kwiatkowski	3	4
4	(Chinese Taipei) J Jung	6	6
5	(Barbados) D King	6	5	6
(United States) D Young	3	7	1
(United States) A Krajicek	5	5
Q	(United States) C Altamirano	7	7
(United States) M Giron	6	1	2
(United States) M Krueger	4	6	6
(United States) JC Aragone	7^{7}	6
2	(United States) B Fratangelo	6^{3}	2

Second round
8	(Egypt) M Safwat	7^{7}	6
PR	(United States) N Meister	6^{4}	4
(United States) C Eubanks	3	7^{7}	4
4	(Chinese Taipei) J Jung	6	6^{5}	6
5	(Barbados) D King	5	6^{2}
Q	(United States) C Altamirano	7	7^{7}
(United States) M Krueger	7^{7}	4	6
(United States) JC Aragone	6^{3}	6	0

Quarterfinals
8	(Egypt) M Safwat	2	6	3
4	(Chinese Taipei) J Jung	6	3	6
Q	(United States) C Altamirano	6	6
(United States) M Krueger	4	4

Semifinals
4	(Chinese Taipei) J Jung	6	6
Q	(United States) C Altamirano	2	2
