= 2016 Nielsen Pro Tennis Championship – Singles =

Singles
- 2016 Nielsen Pro Tennis Championship

Final
- Champion: (Japan) Yoshihito Nishioka
- Runner-up: (United States) Frances Tiafoe
- Score: 6–3, 6–2

Events
Singles	Doubles
- Nielsen Pro Tennis Championship

Somdev Devvarman was the defending champion but chose not to defend his title.

Yoshihito Nishioka won the title after defeating Frances Tiafoe 6–3, 6–2 in the final.

== Seeds ==
1. (Japan) Yoshihito Nishioka (champion)
2. (United States) Tim Smyczek (first round)
3. (United States) Austin Krajicek (second round)
4. (Switzerland) Marco Chiudinelli (second round)
5. (Japan) Go Soeda (semifinals)
6. (Germany) Peter Gojowczyk (semifinals)
7. (Australia) John-Patrick Smith (second round)
8. (United States) Frances Tiafoe (final)

== Draw ==
Key

- Q = Qualifier
- WC = Wild card
- LL = Lucky loser
- Alt = Alternate
- ITF = ITF entry
- PR = Protected ranking
- SR = Special ranking
- SE = Special exempt
- JE = Junior exempt
- JR = Junior Accelerator Programme entrant
- CO = College Accelerator Programme entrant
- NG = Next Gen Accelerator Program entrant
- w/o = Walkover
- r = Retired
- d = Defaulted

=== Finals ===
Semifinals
1	(Japan) Yoshihito Nishioka	6	6
5	(Japan) Go Soeda	2	3
8	(United States) Frances Tiafoe	6	7^{7}
6	(Germany) Peter Gojowczyk	4	6^{5}

Final
1	(Japan) Yoshihito Nishioka	6	6
8	(United States) Frances Tiafoe	3	2

=== Top half ===
First round
1	(Japan) Y Nishioka	6	6
PR	(Slovenia) B Kavčič	0	4
(United States) D Nguyen	6	6
Q	(Switzerland) A Bossel	3	3
(Israel) A Weintraub	7^{7}	1	3
(United States) A Sarkissian	6^{5}	6	6
(Australia) J Duckworth	4	7^{7}	1
7	(Australia) J-P Smith	6	6^{2}	6
4	(Switzerland) M Chiudinelli	7^{7}	6
WC	(United States) A Rybakov	6^{4}	3
(Canada) F Dancevic	6	6
(Australia) M Barton	4	4
(United States) S Kozlov	6	3	6
(United States) S Bangoura	4	6	2
WC	(United States) M McDonald	6^{0}	4
5	(Japan) G Soeda	7^{7}	6

Second round
1	(Japan) Y Nishioka	6	6
(United States) D Nguyen	3	3
(United States) A Sarkissian	7^{8}	6
7	(Australia) J-P Smith	6^{6}	1
4	(Switzerland) M Chiudinelli	3	2
(Canada) F Dancevic	6	6
(United States) S Kozlov	3	2
5	(Japan) G Soeda	6	6

Quarterfinals
1	(Japan) Y Nishioka	6	6
(United States) A Sarkissian	2	4
(Canada) F Dancevic	6^{3}	2
5	(Japan) G Soeda	7^{7}	6

Semifinals
1	(Japan) Y Nishioka	6	6
5	(Japan) G Soeda	2	3

=== Bottom half ===
First round
8	(United States) F Tiafoe	6	1	7
(Chinese Taipei) J Jung	3	6	5
(Australia) B Mitchell	6	3	7
(United States) E Escobedo	4	6	5
WC	(United States) Jared Hiltzik	6^{4}	6	4
(United States) M Krueger	7^{7}	3	6
Q	(United States) Dennis Nevolo	3	6^{5}
3	(United States) A Krajicek	6	7^{7}
6	(Germany) P Gojowczyk	3	6	7^{7}
WC	(United States) T Fawcett	6	0	6^{4}
Q	(United States) R Shane	6^{7}	1
(Republic of Ireland) S Barry	7^{9}	6
(Kazakhstan) A Golubev	2	3
(United States) N Meister	6	6
Q	(United States) A Kuznetsov	7^{7}	6
2	(United States) T Smyczek	6^{3}	4

Second round
8	(United States) F Tiafoe	7	6
(Australia) B Mitchell	5	3
(United States) M Krueger	7	3	6
3	(United States) A Krajicek	5	6	4
6	(Germany) P Gojowczyk	6	6
(Republic of Ireland) S Barry	4	2
(United States) N Meister	3	2
Q	(United States) A Kuznetsov	6	6

Quarterfinals
8	(United States) F Tiafoe	6	6
(United States) M Krueger	3	2
6	(Germany) P Gojowczyk	6	6
Q	(United States) A Kuznetsov	3	4

Semifinals
8	(United States) F Tiafoe	6	7^{7}
6	(Germany) P Gojowczyk	4	6^{5}
