= 2017 Nielsen Pro Tennis Championship – Doubles =

Doubles
- 2017 Nielsen Pro Tennis Championship

Final
- Champions: (Thailand) Sanchai Ratiwatana (Indonesia) Christopher Rungkat
- Runners-up: (United States) Kevin King (United States) Bradley Klahn
- Score: 7–6^{(7–4)}, 6–2

Events
Singles	Doubles
← 2016 ·	Nielsen Pro Tennis Championship	· 2018 →

Stefan Kozlov and John-Patrick Smith were the defending champions but chose not to defend their title.

Sanchai Ratiwatana and Christopher Rungkat won the title after defeating Kevin King and Bradley Klahn 7–6^{(7–4)}, 6–2 in the final.

== Seeds ==
1. (Thailand) Sanchai Ratiwatana / (Indonesia) Christopher Rungkat (champions)
2. (China) Gong Maoxin / (Chinese Taipei) Peng Hsien-yin (first round)
3. (Australia) Jarryd Chaplin / (Australia) Luke Saville (quarterfinals)
4. (United States) Austin Krajicek / (United States) Jackson Withrow (quarterfinals)

== Draw ==
=== Key ===
- Q = Qualifier
- WC = Wild card
- LL = Lucky loser
- Alt = Alternate
- SE = Special exempt
- PR = Protected ranking
- ITF = ITF entry
- JE = Junior exempt
- w/o = Walkover
- r = Retired
- d = Defaulted
- SR = Special ranking

First round
1	(Thailand) Sa Ratiwatana (Indonesia) C Rungkat	6	6
WC	(United States) Charlie Emhardt (United States) Jeffrey Schorsch	3	4
(Germany) D Köpfer (United States) A Lawson	7^{7}	6
(India) J Nedunchezhiyan (India) R Ramanathan	6^{3}	2
3	(Australia) Jarryd Chaplin (Australia) L Saville	w/o
(Germany) M Bachinger (Switzerland) M Chiudinelli
(Australia) M Ebden (Australia) A Whittington	7^{7}	6
(Republic of Ireland) J McGee (United States) D Novikov	6^{4}	4
(Australia) A Bolt (Japan) A Santillan	4	6	[10]
(United States) T Fritz (United States) T Paul	6	3	[3]
WC	(United States) C Eubanks (United States) B Holt	4	6^{4}
4	(United States) A Krajicek (United States) J Withrow	6	7^{7}
PR	(United States) K King (United States) B Klahn	7	6
(United States) M Krueger (United States) D Kudla	5	3
WC	(United States) Ma Redlicki (United States) Mi Redlicki	7	4	[10]
2	(China) M Gong (Chinese Taipei) H-y Peng	5	6	[6]

Quarterfinals
1	(Thailand) Sa Ratiwatana (Indonesia) C Rungkat	7	7^{7}
(Germany) D Köpfer (United States) A Lawson	5	6^{4}
3	(Australia) J Chaplin (Australia) L Saville	3	6^{7}
(Australia) M Ebden (Australia) A Whittington	6	7^{9}
(Australia) A Bolt (Japan) A Santillan	6	6
4	(United States) A Krajicek (United States) J Withrow	3	4
PR	(United States) K King (United States) B Klahn	6	6
WC	(United States) Ma Redlicki (United States) Mi Redlicki	3	4

Semifinals
1	(Thailand) Sa Ratiwatana (Indonesia) C Rungkat	6	6
(Australia) M Ebden (Australia) A Whittington	2	1
(Australia) A Bolt (Japan) A Santillan	3	6^{3}
PR	(United States) K King (United States) B Klahn	6	7^{7}

Final
1	(Thailand) Sa Ratiwatana (Indonesia) C Rungkat	7^{7}	6
PR	(United States) K King (United States) B Klahn	6^{4}	2
