= 2014 Nielsen Pro Tennis Championship =

- Date: 30 June – 6 July
- Edition: 23rd
- Surface: Hard
- Location: Winnetka, Illinois, United States

Champions

Singles
- (United States) Denis Kudla

Doubles
- (Australia) Thanasi Kokkinakis / (United States) Denis Kudla
- Nielsen Pro Tennis Championship

The 2014 Nielsen Pro Tennis Championship was a professional tennis tournament played on hard courts. It was the 23rd edition of the tournament which was part of the 2014 ATP Challenger Tour. It took place in Winnetka, Illinois, between 30 June and 6 July 2014.

== Singles main-draw entrants ==
=== Seeds ===
Country	Player	Rank^{1}	Seed
USA	Michael Russell	94	1
USA	Tim Smyczek	106	2
RUS	Evgeny Donskoy	114	3
TUN	Malek Jaziri	121	4
AUS	Sam Groth	124	5
IND	Somdev Devvarman	125	6
USA	Denis Kudla	136	7
LTU	Ričardas Berankis	139	8

- ^{1} Rankings are as of June 23, 2014.

=== Other entrants ===
The following players received wildcards into the singles main draw:

- (United States) Marcos Giron
- (United States) Jared Hiltzik
- (United States) Evan King
- (United States) Raymond Sarmiento

The following player received entry as a lucky loser into the singles main draw:

- (United States) Jeff Dadamo

The following players received entry from the qualifying draw:

- (United States) Ronnie Schneider
- (United States) Mackenzie McDonald
- (United States) Dennis Nevolo
- (United States) Eric Quigley

== Champions ==
=== Singles ===
- (United States) Denis Kudla def. (Uzbekistan) Farrukh Dustov, 6–2, 6–2

=== Doubles ===
- (Australia) Thanasi Kokkinakis / (United States) Denis Kudla def. (United States) Evan King / (United States) Raymond Sarmiento, 6–2, 7–6^{(7–4)}
