= 2018 Nielsen Pro Tennis Championship =

- Date: 9–14 July
- Edition: 27th
- Surface: Hard
- Location: Winnetka, United States

Champions

Singles
- (Russia) Evgeny Karlovskiy

Doubles
- (United States) Austin Krajicek / (India) Jeevan Nedunchezhiyan
| ← 2017 · | Nielsen Pro Tennis Championship | · 2019 → |

The 2018 Nielsen Pro Tennis Championship was a professional tennis tournament played on hard courts. It was the 27th edition of the tournament which was part of the 2018 ATP Challenger Tour. It took place in Winnetka, Illinois, between 9 and 14 July 2018.

== Singles main-draw entrants ==
=== Seeds ===
| Country | Player | Rank^{1} | Seed |
|---|---|---|---|
| USA | Tim Smyczek | 113 | 1 |
| USA | Bjorn Fratangelo | 129 | 2 |
| IND | Ramkumar Ramanathan | 140 | 3 |
| TPE | Jason Jung | 155 | 4 |
| BAR | Darian King | 160 | 5 |
| USA | Reilly Opelka | 161 | 6 |
| USA | Kevin King | 172 | 7 |
| EGY | Mohamed Safwat | 175 | 8 |

- ^{1} Rankings are as of July 2, 2018.

=== Other entrants ===
The following players received wildcards into the singles main draw:

- (United States) Tom Fawcett
- (United States) Martin Joyce
- (United States) Thai-Son Kwiatkowski
- (United States) Danny Thomas

The following players received entry into the singles main draw using protected rankings:

- (France) Tom Jomby
- (United States) Nicolas Meister

The following players received entry from the qualifying draw:

- (United States) Collin Altamirano
- (Tunisia) Aziz Dougaz
- (Burundi) Guy Orly Iradukunda
- (United States) Martin Redlicki

== Champions ==
=== Singles ===
- (Russia) Evgeny Karlovskiy def. (Chinese Taipei) Jason Jung 6–3, 6–2.

=== Doubles ===
- (United States) Austin Krajicek / (India) Jeevan Nedunchezhiyan def. (Venezuela) Roberto Maytín / (Indonesia) Christopher Rungkat 6–7^{(4–7)}, 6–4, [10–5].
