= 2018 Nielsen Pro Tennis Championship – Doubles =

Doubles
- 2018 Nielsen Pro Tennis Championship

Final
- Champions: (United States) Austin Krajicek (India) Jeevan Nedunchezhiyan
- Runners-up: (Venezuela) Roberto Maytín (Indonesia) Christopher Rungkat
- Score: 6–7^{(4–7)}, 6–4, [10–5]

Events
Singles	Doubles
← 2017 ·	Nielsen Pro Tennis Championship	· 2019 →

Sanchai Ratiwatana and Christopher Rungkat were the defending champions but only Rungkat chose to defend his title, partnering Roberto Maytín. Rungkat lost in the final to Austin Krajicek and Jeevan Nedunchezhiyan.

Krajicek and Nedunchezhiyan won the title after defeating Maytín and Rungkat 6–7^{(4–7)}, 6–4, [10–5] in the final.

== Seeds ==
1. (United States) Austin Krajicek / (India) Jeevan Nedunchezhiyan (champions)
2. (Venezuela) Roberto Maytín / (Indonesia) Christopher Rungkat (final)
3. (United States) Robert Galloway / (United States) Evan King (quarterfinals)
4. (Australia) Jarryd Chaplin / (Australia) Luke Saville (first round)

== Draw ==
=== Key ===
- Q = Qualifier
- WC = Wild card
- LL = Lucky loser
- Alt = Alternate
- ITF = ITF entry
- PR = Protected ranking
- SR = Special ranking
- SE = Special exempt
- JE = Junior exempt
- JR = Junior Accelerator Programme entrant
- CO = College Accelerator Programme entrant
- NG = Next Gen Accelerator Program entrant
- w/o = Walkover
- r = Retired
- d = Defaulted

First round
1	(United States) A Krajicek (India) J Nedunchezhiyan	6	6
(United States) M Krueger (United States) A Lawson	3	3
WC	(United States) Ma Redlicki (United States) Mi Redlicki	6^{4}	6^{4}
(United States) H Johnson (United States) Y Johnson	7^{7}	7^{7}
3	(United States) R Galloway (United States) E King	6	7
(Russia) E Karlovskiy (Egypt) M Safwat	4	5
(United States) K King (United States) J Withrow	6	6^{5}	[7]
WC	(United States) Jared Hiltzik (United States) T Kopinski	4	7^{7}	[10]
(Brazil) K Sell (Brazil) Thales Turini	7^{7}	6
WC	(Monaco) L Catarina (United States) P Kobelt	6^{2}	3
(United States) JC Aragone (United States) M Giron	6	6
4	(Australia) Jarryd Chaplin (Australia) L Saville	3	3
(United States) C Eubanks (United States) D Young	7^{8}	5	[10]
(United States) B Fratangelo (United States) T-S Kwiatkowski	6^{6}	7	[7]
PR	(France) Tom Jomby (Barbados) D King	5	7	[9]
2	(Venezuela) R Maytín (Indonesia) C Rungkat	7	5	[11]

Quarterfinals
1	(United States) A Krajicek (India) J Nedunchezhiyan	6	6
(United States) H Johnson (United States) Y Johnson	4	2
3	(United States) R Galloway (United States) E King	6	4	[4]
WC	(United States) J Hiltzik (United States) T Kopinski	3	6	[10]
(Brazil) K Sell (Brazil) T Turini	3	4
(United States) JC Aragone (United States) M Giron	6	6
(United States) C Eubanks (United States) D Young	3	2
2	(Venezuela) R Maytín (Indonesia) C Rungkat	6	6

Semifinals
1	(United States) A Krajicek (India) J Nedunchezhiyan	7^{7}	6
WC	(United States) J Hiltzik (United States) T Kopinski	6^{2}	4
(United States) JC Aragone (United States) M Giron	4	6	[13]
2	(Venezuela) R Maytín (Indonesia) C Rungkat	6	4	[15]

Final
1	(United States) A Krajicek (India) J Nedunchezhiyan	6^{4}	6	[10]
2	(Venezuela) R Maytín (Indonesia) C Rungkat	7^{7}	4	[5]
