= 2016 Nielsen Pro Tennis Championship =

- Date: 4–10 July
- Edition: 25th
- Surface: Hard
- Location: Winnetka, Illinois, United States

Champions

Singles
- (Japan) Yoshihito Nishioka

Doubles
- (United States) Stefan Kozlov / (Australia) John-Patrick Smith
- Nielsen Pro Tennis Championship

The 2016 Nielsen Pro Tennis Championship is a professional tennis tournament played on hard courts. It is the 25th edition of the tournament which is part of the 2016 ATP Challenger Tour. It will take place in Winnetka, Illinois, between 4 and 10 July 2016.

== Singles main-draw entrants ==
=== Seeds ===
Country	Player	Rank^{1}	Seed
JPN	Yoshihito Nishioka	122	1
USA	Tim Smyczek	125	2
USA	Austin Krajicek	132	3
SUI	Marco Chiudinelli	138	4
JPN	Go Soeda	156	5
GER	Peter Gojowczyk	157	6
AUS	John-Patrick Smith	160	7
USA	Frances Tiafoe	167	8

- ^{1} Rankings are as of June 27, 2016.

=== Other entrants ===
The following players received wildcards into the singles main draw:

- (United States) Tom Fawcett
- (United States) Jared Hiltzik
- (United States) Mackenzie McDonald
- (United States) Alex Rybakov

The following player received entry into the singles main draw with a protected ranking:

- (Slovenia) Blaž Kavčič

The following players received entry from the qualifying draw:

- (Switzerland) Adrien Bossel
- (United States) Alex Kuznetsov
- (United States) Dennis Nevolo
- (United States) Ryan Shane

== Champions ==
=== Singles ===
- (Japan) Yoshihito Nishioka def. (United States) Frances Tiafoe, 6–3, 6–2

=== Doubles ===
- (United States) Stefan Kozlov / (Australia) John-Patrick Smith def. (United States) Sekou Bangoura / (Republic of Ireland) David O'Hare, 6–3, 6–3
