= 2013 Nielsen Pro Tennis Championship =

- Date: 1–7 July
- Edition: 22nd
- Surface: Hard
- Location: Winnetka, United States

Champions

Singles
- (United States) Jack Sock

Doubles
- (India) Yuki Bhambri / (New Zealand) Michael Venus
- Nielsen Pro Tennis Championship

The 2013 Nielsen Pro Tennis Championship was a professional tennis tournament played on hard courts. It was the 22nd edition of the tournament which was part of the 2013 ATP Challenger Tour. It took place in Winnetka, Illinois, between 1 and 7 July 2013.

== Singles main-draw entrants ==
=== Seeds ===
Country	Player	Rank^{1}	Seed
RUS	Alex Bogomolov Jr.	81	1
USA	Steve Johnson	98	2
USA	Jack Sock	102	3
USA	Tim Smyczek	120	4
IND	Somdev Devvarman	136	5
GER	Mischa Zverev	145	6
USA	Donald Young	154	7
USA	Bradley Klahn	178	8

- ^{1} Rankings are as of June 24, 2013.

=== Other entrants ===
The following players received wildcards into the singles main draw:

- (United States) Jarmere Jenkins
- (United States) Evan King
- (United States) Dennis Nevolo
- (United States) Jack Sock

The following players received entry as an alternate into the singles main draw:

- (United States) Eric Quigley
- (United States) Michael McClune
- (Croatia) Ante Pavić

The following players received entry from the qualifying draw:

- (United States) Sekou Bangoura
- (United States) Jeff Dadamo
- (United States) Kevin King
- (Latvia) Mārtiņš Podžus

== Champions ==
=== Singles ===
- (United States) Jack Sock def. (United States) Bradley Klahn 6–4, 6–2

=== Doubles ===
- (India) Yuki Bhambri / (New Zealand) Michael Venus def. (India) Somdev Devvarman / (United States) Jack Sock 2–6, 6–2, [10–8]
