= 2009 Nielsen Pro Tennis Championship =

- Date: June 29 – July 5
- Edition: 18th
- Surface: Hard
- Location: Winnetka, Illinois, United States

Champions

Singles
- (United States) Alex Kuznetsov

Doubles
- (Australia) Carsten Ball / (United States) Travis Rettenmaier
← 2008 ·	Nielsen Pro Tennis Championship	· 2010 →

The 2009 Nielsen Pro Tennis Championship was a professional tennis tournament played on outdoor hard courts. It was the 18th edition of the tournament which was part of the 2009 ATP Challenger Tour. It took place in Winnetka, Illinois, between 29 June and 5 July 2009.

== Singles entrants ==
=== Seeds ===
Nationality	Player	Ranking*	Seeding
USA	John Isner	97	1
USA	Vince Spadea	113	2
USA	Brendan Evans	138	3
USA	Donald Young	159	4
USA	Rajeev Ram	160	5
GER	Simon Stadler	161	6
USA	Ryan Sweeting	164	7
ITA	Andrea Stoppini	177	8

- Rankings are as of June 22, 2009.

=== Other entrants ===
The following players received wildcards into the singles main draw:

- (United States) Alex Bogomolov Jr.
- (Australia) Samuel Groth
- (United States) Dennis Nevolo
- (United States) Phillip Simmonds

The following players received entry from the qualifying draw:

- (Mexico) Juan-Manuel Elizondo
- (New Zealand) G.D. Jones
- (United States) Alex Kuznetsov
- (United States) Tim Smyczek

== Champions ==
=== Singles ===
(United States) Alex Kuznetsov def. (United States) Tim Smyczek, 6–4, 7–6(1)

=== Doubles ===
(Australia) Carsten Ball / (United States) Travis Rettenmaier def. (United States) Brett Joelson / (United States) Ryan Sweeting, 6–1, 6–2
