= 2010 Nielsen Pro Tennis Championship – Singles =

Singles
- 2010 Nielsen Pro Tennis Championship

Final
- Champion: (Argentina) Brian Dabul
- Runner-up: (United States) Tim Smyczek
- Score: 6–1, 1–6, 6–1

Events
Singles	Doubles
← 2009 ·	Nielsen Pro Tennis Championship	· 2011 →

Alex Kuznetsov was the defender of championship title, but he lost to Michael Russell in the first round. Brian Dabul defeated Tim Smyczek 6–1, 1–6, 6–1 in the final.

== Seeds ==
1. (Germany) Björn Phau (Quarterfinal)
2. (United States) Michael Russell (semifinal)
3. (India) Somdev Devvarman (first round)
4. (Argentina) Brian Dabul (champion)
5. (United States) Donald Young (semifinal)
6. (France) Édouard Roger-Vasselin (first round)
7. (Japan) Go Soeda (second round)
8. (United States) Kevin Kim (second round)

== Draw ==
=== Key ===
- Q = Qualifier
- WC = Wild card
- LL = Lucky loser
- Alt = Alternate
- SE = Special exempt
- PR = Protected ranking
- ITF = ITF entry
- JE = Junior exempt
- w/o = Walkover
- r = Retired
- d = Defaulted
- SR = Special ranking

=== Finals ===
Semifinals
(United States) Tim Smyczek	6	6
5	(United States) Donald Young	4	2
4	(Argentina) Brian Dabul	6	6
2	(United States) Michael Russell	1	4

Final
(United States) Tim Smyczek	1	6	1
4	(Argentina) Brian Dabul	6	1	6

=== Top half ===
First round
1	(Germany) B Phau	6	7
(United States) B Reynolds	4	6^{4}
Q	(Canada) P-L Duclos	7	0	6
(Dominican Republic) V Estrella	6^{4}	6	4
(United States) J Witten	1	4
(United States) T Smyczek	6	6
Q	(Russia) A Sitak	1	2
8	(United States) K Kim	6	6
3	(India) S Devvarman	6	3	4
(United States) L Cook	4	6	6
Q	(South Africa) F Wolmarans	7	6
(South Africa) I Merwe	6^{8}	4
WC	(United States) A Krajicek	3	2
WC	(Germany) S Stadler	6	6
WC	(United States) R Harrison	3	2
5	(United States) D Young	6	6

Second round
1	(Germany) B Phau	4	6	6
Q	(Canada) P-L Duclos	6	1	3
(United States) T Smyczek	6	6
8	(United States) K Kim	4	1
(United States) L Cook	6	6
Q	(South Africa) F Wolmarans	2	3
WC	(Germany) S Stadler	3	5
5	(United States) D Young	6	7

Quarterfinals
1	(Germany) B Phau	5	6	0
(United States) T Smyczek	7	2	6
(United States) L Cook	6^{3}	1
5	(United States) D Young	7	6

Semifinals
(United States) T Smyczek	6	6
5	(United States) D Young	4	2

=== Bottom half ===
First round
6	(France) É Roger-Vasselin	7	3	3
(Canada) P Polansky	5	6	6
(Japan) T Ito	1	2
Q	(Canada) M Raonic	6	6
(Germany) A Begemann	6	6
(United States) M Yani	3	4
WC	(United States) JP Fruttero	4	3
4	(Argentina) B Dabul	6	6
7	(Japan) G Soeda	7	6
(United States) R DeHeart	6^{7}	1
(South Africa) R de Voest	6	6
(Austria) A Peya	2	1
ALT	(Israel) N Okun	6^{4}	3
(Spain) A Brugués-Davi	7	6
(United States) A Kuznetsov	4	2
2	(United States) M Russell	6	6

Second round
(Canada) P Polansky	6	2	3
Q	(Canada) M Raonic	3	6	6
(Germany) A Begemann	2	0
4	(Argentina) B Dabul	6	6
7	(Japan) G Soeda	4	4
(South Africa) R de Voest	6	6
(Spain) A Brugués-Davi	2	0
2	(United States) M Russell	6	6

Quarterfinals
Q	(Canada) M Raonic	7	3	4
4	(Argentina) B Dabul	5	6	6
(South Africa) R de Voest	6	4	3
2	(United States) M Russell	4	6	6

Semifinals
4	(Argentina) B Dabul	6	6
2	(United States) M Russell	1	4
