= 2011 Nielsen Pro Tennis Championship =

- Date: 26 June – 3 July
- Edition: 20th
- Surface: Hard
- Location: Winnetka, Illinois, United States

Champions

Singles
- (United States) James Blake

Doubles
- (Philippines) Treat Conrad Huey / (United States) Bobby Reynolds
← 2010 ·	Nielsen Pro Tennis Championship	· 2012 →

The 2011 Nielsen Pro Tennis Championship was a professional tennis tournament played on hard courts. It was the 20th edition of the tournament which was part of the 2011 ATP Challenger Tour. It took place in Winnetka, Illinois, between June 26 and July 3, 2011.

== ATP entrants ==
=== Seeds ===
Country	Player	Rank^{1}	Seed
USA	Michael Russell	90	1
USA	James Blake	102	2
USA	Donald Young	111	3
JPN	Go Soeda	131	4
USA	Bobby Reynolds	138	5
ARG	Brian Dabul	141	6
CHI	Paul Capdeville	142	7
RSA	Rik de Voest	147	8

- ^{1} Rankings are as of June 20, 2011.

=== Other entrants ===
The following players received wildcards into the singles main draw:

- (United States) James Blake
- (United States) Robby Ginepri
- (United States) Evan King
- (United States) Jack Sock

The following players received entry as a special exempt into the singles main draw:

- (Canada) Pierre-Ludovic Duclos

The following players received entry from the qualifying draw:

- (Slovenia) Luka Gregorc
- (United States) Bradley Klahn
- (United States) Denis Kudla
- (United States) Michael Shabaz

== Champions ==
=== Singles ===
(United States) James Blake def. (United States) Bobby Reynolds, 6–3, 6–1

=== Doubles ===
(Philippines) Treat Conrad Huey / (United States) Bobby Reynolds def. (Australia) Jordan Kerr / (United States) Travis Parrott, 7–6^{(9–7)}, 6–4
