= 2010 Nielsen Pro Tennis Championship =

- Date: June 28 – July 4
- Edition: 19th
- Surface: Hard
- Location: Winnetka, United States

Champions

Singles
- (Argentina) Brian Dabul

Doubles
- (United States) Ryler DeHeart / (Canada) Pierre-Ludovic Duclos
← 2009 ·	Nielsen Pro Tennis Championship	· 2011 →

The 2010 Nielsen Pro Tennis Championship was a professional tennis tournament played on outdoor hard courts. It was the 19th edition of the tournament which was part of the 2010 ATP Challenger Tour. It took place in Winnetka, Illinois, between 28 June and 4 July 2010.

== ATP entrants ==
=== Seeds ===
Nationality	Player	Ranking*	Seeding
GER	Björn Phau	100	1
USA	Michael Russell	101	2
IND	Somdev Devvarman	103	3
ARG	Brian Dabul	111	4
USA	Donald Young	113	5
FRA	Édouard Roger-Vasselin	116	6
JPN	Go Soeda	124	7
USA	Kevin Kim	142	8

- Rankings are as of June 21, 2010.

=== Other entrants ===
The following players received wildcards into the singles main draw:

- (United States) John Paul Fruttero
- (United States) Ryan Harrison
- (United States) Austin Krajicek
- (Germany) Simon Stadler

The following players received entry as alternative:

- (Israel) Noam Okun
- (United States) Donald Young

The following players received entry from the qualifying draw:

- (Canada) Pierre-Ludovic Duclos
- (Canada) Milos Raonic
- (Russia) Artem Sitak
- (South Africa) Fritz Wolmarans

== Champions ==
=== Singles ===
(Argentina) Brian Dabul def. (United States) Tim Smyczek, 6–1, 1–6, 6–1

=== Doubles ===
(United States) Ryler DeHeart / (Canada) Pierre-Ludovic Duclos def. (South Africa) Rik de Voest / (India) Somdev Devvarman, 7–6(4), 4–6, [10–8]
