= 2016 Nielsen Pro Tennis Championship – Doubles =

Doubles
- 2016 Nielsen Pro Tennis Championship

Final
- Champions: (United States) Stefan Kozlov (Australia) John-Patrick Smith
- Runners-up: (United States) Sekou Bangoura (Republic of Ireland) David O'Hare
- Score: 6–3, 6–3

Events
Singles	Doubles
- Nielsen Pro Tennis Championship

Johan Brunström and Nicholas Monroe were the defending champions but chose not to defend their title.

Stefan Kozlov and John-Patrick Smith won the title after defeating Sekou Bangoura and David O'Hare 6–3, 6–3 in the final.

== Seeds ==
1. (India) Jeevan Nedunchezhiyan / (India) Divij Sharan (quarterfinals)
2. (Kazakhstan) Andrey Golubev / (South Africa) Dean O'Brien (semifinals)
3. (United States) Sekou Bangoura / (Republic of Ireland) David O'Hare (final)
4. (United States) Nicolas Meister / (United States) Eric Quigley (quarterfinals)

== Draw ==
Key

- Q = Qualifier
- WC = Wild card
- LL = Lucky loser
- Alt = Alternate
- ITF = ITF entry
- PR = Protected ranking
- SR = Special ranking
- SE = Special exempt
- JE = Junior exempt
- JR = Junior Accelerator Programme entrant
- CO = College Accelerator Programme entrant
- NG = Next Gen Accelerator Program entrant
- w/o = Walkover
- r = Retired
- d = Defaulted

First round
1	(India) J Nedunchezhiyan (India) D Sharan	6	6
WC	(United States) S Kirchheimer (United States) Konrad Zieba	4	4
(United States) S Kozlov (Australia) J-P Smith	6	6
(Switzerland) M Chiudinelli (Japan) Y Nishioka	4	2
4	(United States) N Meister (United States) E Quigley	6	6
(United States) E Escobedo (United States) A Sarkissian	1	3
(Australia) Jarryd Chaplin (New Zealand) B McLachlan	3	6	[7]
WC	(United States) A Lawson (United States) J Withrow	6	3	[10]
(Germany) P Gojowczyk (Israel) A Weintraub	7	6
(Australia) D Kelly (Australia) M Matosevic	5	4
(United States) D Nguyen (Japan) G Soeda	6	2	[6]
3	(United States) S Bangoura (Republic of Ireland) D O'Hare	2	6	[10]
PR	(United States) JP Fruttero (Chinese Taipei) J Jung	0	6	[10]
WC	(United States) E King (United States) Dennis Nevolo	6	3	[8]
(Republic of Ireland) S Barry (United States) M Krueger	6	6^{5}	[8]
2	(Kazakhstan) A Golubev (South Africa) D O'Brien	3	7^{7}	[10]

Quarterfinals
1	(India) J Nedunchezhiyan (India) D Sharan	6	5	[9]
(United States) S Kozlov (Australia) J-P Smith	4	7	[11]
4	(United States) N Meister (United States) E Quigley	6	4	[7]
WC	(United States) A Lawson (United States) J Withrow	1	6	[10]
(Germany) P Gojowczyk (Israel) A Weintraub	6^{4}	1
3	(United States) S Bangoura (Republic of Ireland) D O'Hare	7^{7}	6
PR	(United States) JP Fruttero (Chinese Taipei) J Jung	4	5
2	(Kazakhstan) A Golubev (South Africa) D O'Brien	6	7

Semifinals
(United States) S Kozlov (Australia) J-P Smith	3	6	[10]
WC	(United States) A Lawson (United States) J Withrow	6	2	[6]
3	(United States) S Bangoura (Republic of Ireland) D O'Hare	6	7^{9}
2	(Kazakhstan) A Golubev (South Africa) D O'Brien	2	6^{7}

Final
(United States) S Kozlov (Australia) J-P Smith	6	6
3	(United States) S Bangoura (Republic of Ireland) D O'Hare	3	3
