= 2022 Sparkassen ATP Challenger – Doubles =

Doubles
- 2022 Sparkassen ATP Challenger

Final
- Champions: (Uzbekistan) Denis Istomin; Evgeny Karlovskiy
- Runners-up: (Italy) Marco Bortolotti (Spain) Sergio Martos Gornés
- Score: 6–3, 7–5

Events
Singles	Doubles
- Sparkassen ATP Challenger

Antonio Šančić and Tristan-Samuel Weissborn were the defending champions but only Weissborn chose to defend his title, partnering Romain Arneodo. Weissborn lost in the quarterfinals to Marco Bortolotti and Sergio Martos Gornés.

Denis Istomin and Evgeny Karlovskiy won the title after defeating Bortolotti and Martos Gornés 6–3, 7–5 in the final.

== Seeds ==
1. (Ukraine) Denys Molchanov / (Pakistan) Aisam-ul-Haq Qureshi (semifinals)
2. (Jamaica) Dustin Brown / (Italy) Andrea Vavassori (quarterfinals)
3. (Czech Republic) Roman Jebavý / (Czech Republic) Adam Pavlásek (quarterfinals)
4. (Monaco) Romain Arneodo / (Austria) Tristan-Samuel Weissborn (quarterfinals)

== Draw ==
Key

- Q = Qualifier
- WC = Wild card
- LL = Lucky loser
- Alt = Alternate
- ITF = ITF entry
- PR = Protected ranking
- SR = Special ranking
- SE = Special exempt
- JE = Junior exempt
- JR = Junior Accelerator Programme entrant
- CO = College Accelerator Programme entrant
- NG = Next Gen Accelerator Program entrant
- w/o = Walkover
- r = Retired
- d = Defaulted

First round
(Italy) F Cobolli (Italy) F Maestrelli	4	4
(Romania) M Copil (Spain) A Menéndez Maceiras	6	6
4	(Monaco) R Arneodo (Austria) T-S Weissborn	6	6
Alt	(Italy) Nicolas Compagnucci (Italy) Tommaso Compagnucci	4	2
(Italy) G Oradini (Ukraine) O Ovcharenko	7^{10}	4	[5]
(Italy) M Bortolotti (Spain) S Martos Gornés	6^{8}	6	[10]
(Uzbekistan) D Istomin; E Karlovskiy	6	7^{7}
Alt	(Italy) Niccolò Catini (Italy) Gabriele Maria Noce	2	6^{4}
WC	(Italy) Gabriel Moroder (Italy) Patric Prinoth	2	4
3	(Czech Republic) R Jebavý (Czech Republic) A Pavlásek	6	6
(Czech Republic) P Nouza (Czech Republic) A Paulson	6	6
(Hungary) F Marozsán (Czech Republic) L Rosol	3	4
(Czech Republic) T Macháč (Czech Republic) D Poljak	6^{4}	3
2	(Jamaica) D Brown (Italy) A Vavassori	7^{7}	6

Quarterfinals
1	(Ukraine) D Molchanov (Pakistan) A-u-H Qureshi	4	7^{7}	[15]
(Romania) M Copil (Spain) A Menéndez Maceiras	6	6^{5}	[13]
4	(Monaco) R Arneodo (Austria) T-S Weissborn	3	7	[9]
(Italy) M Bortolotti (Spain) S Martos Gornés	6	5	[11]
(Uzbekistan) D Istomin; E Karlovskiy	4	7	[10]
3	(Czech Republic) R Jebavý (Czech Republic) A Pavlásek	6	5	[4]
(Czech Republic) P Nouza (Czech Republic) A Paulson	6	7^{7}
2	(Jamaica) D Brown (Italy) A Vavassori	4	6^{4}

Semifinals
1	(Ukraine) D Molchanov (Pakistan) A-u-H Qureshi	3	3
(Italy) M Bortolotti (Spain) S Martos Gornés	6	6
(Uzbekistan) D Istomin; E Karlovskiy	6	6^{2}	[11]
(Czech Republic) P Nouza (Czech Republic) A Paulson	3	7^{7}	[9]

Final
(Italy) M Bortolotti (Spain) S Martos Gornés	3	5
(Uzbekistan) D Istomin; E Karlovskiy	6	7
