= 2011 Nielsen Pro Tennis Championship – Doubles =

Doubles
- 2011 Nielsen Pro Tennis Championship

Final
- Champions: (Philippines) Treat Conrad Huey (United States) Bobby Reynolds
- Runners-up: (Australia) Jordan Kerr (United States) Travis Parrott
- Score: 7–6^{(9–7)}, 6–4

Events
Singles	Doubles
- Nielsen Pro Tennis Championship

Ryler DeHeart and Pierre-Ludovic Duclos were the defending champions and only Duclos decided to participate.
He played with Alex Kuznetsov, but they lost to Jordan Kerr and Travis Parrott in the first round.
The Australian/American pair reached the final, where Treat Conrad Huey and Bobby Reynolds defeated them 7–6^{(9–7)}, 6–4.

== Seeds ==
1. (Philippines) Treat Conrad Huey / (United States) Bobby Reynolds (champions)
2. (Australia) Jordan Kerr / (United States) Travis Parrott (final)
3. (Argentina) Brian Dabul / (South Africa) Rik de Voest (semifinals)
4. (United States) John Paul Fruttero / (South Africa) Raven Klaasen (semifinals)

== Draw ==
Key

- Q = Qualifier
- WC = Wild card
- LL = Lucky loser
- Alt = Alternate
- ITF = ITF entry
- PR = Protected ranking
- SR = Special ranking
- SE = Special exempt
- JE = Junior exempt
- JR = Junior Accelerator Programme entrant
- CO = College Accelerator Programme entrant
- NG = Next Gen Accelerator Program entrant
- w/o = Walkover
- r = Retired
- d = Defaulted

=== Draw ===
First round
1	(Philippines) TC Huey (United States) B Reynolds	6	6
(United States) Ashwin Kumar (Canada) Kamil Pajkowski	3	3
(United States) S Bangoura (United States) D Kudla	6^{4}	4
(Lithuania) L Grigelis (Italy) A Stoppini	7	6
4	(United States) JP Fruttero (South Africa) R Klaasen	6	6^{4}	[10]
(Slovakia) I Klec (Thailand) D Udomchoke	2	7	[3]
(Germany) A Begemann (Israel) A Weintraub	1	1
(United States) N Monroe (United States) D Young	6	6
WC	(United States) Evan King (United States) Dennis Nevolo	6	6
WC	(United States) Marek Czerwinski (United States) Abraham Souza	4	1
WC	(United States) Thomas Blake (United States) Robert Stineman	3	6	[6]
3	(Argentina) B Dabul (South Africa) R de Voest	6	3	[10]
(United States) Greg Ouellette (New Zealand) M Venus	1	4
(United States) M Shabaz (United States) J Sock	6	6
(Canada) P-L Duclos (United States) A Kuznetsov	0	4
2	(Australia) J Kerr (United States) T Parrott	6	6

Quarterfinals
1	(Philippines) TC Huey (United States) B Reynolds	6	6
(Lithuania) L Grigelis (Italy) A Stoppini	1	4
4	(United States) JP Fruttero (South Africa) R Klaasen	3	6	[10]
(United States) N Monroe (United States) D Young	6	2	[4]
WC	(United States) Evan King (United States) Dennis Nevolo	5	5
3	(Argentina) B Dabul (South Africa) R de Voest	7	7
(United States) M Shabaz (United States) J Sock	6	4	[7]
2	(Australia) J Kerr (United States) T Parrott	1	6	[10]

Semifinals
1	(Philippines) TC Huey (United States) B Reynolds	6	7
4	(United States) JP Fruttero (South Africa) R Klaasen	3	6^{4}
3	(Argentina) B Dabul (South Africa) R de Voest	6	3	[8]
2	(Australia) J Kerr (United States) T Parrott	4	6	[10]

Final
1	(Philippines) TC Huey (United States) B Reynolds	7^{9}	6
2	(Australia) J Kerr (United States) T Parrott	6^{7}	4
