= Evgeny Karlovskiy =

Russian tennis player

Evgeny Karlovskiy Евгений Карловский
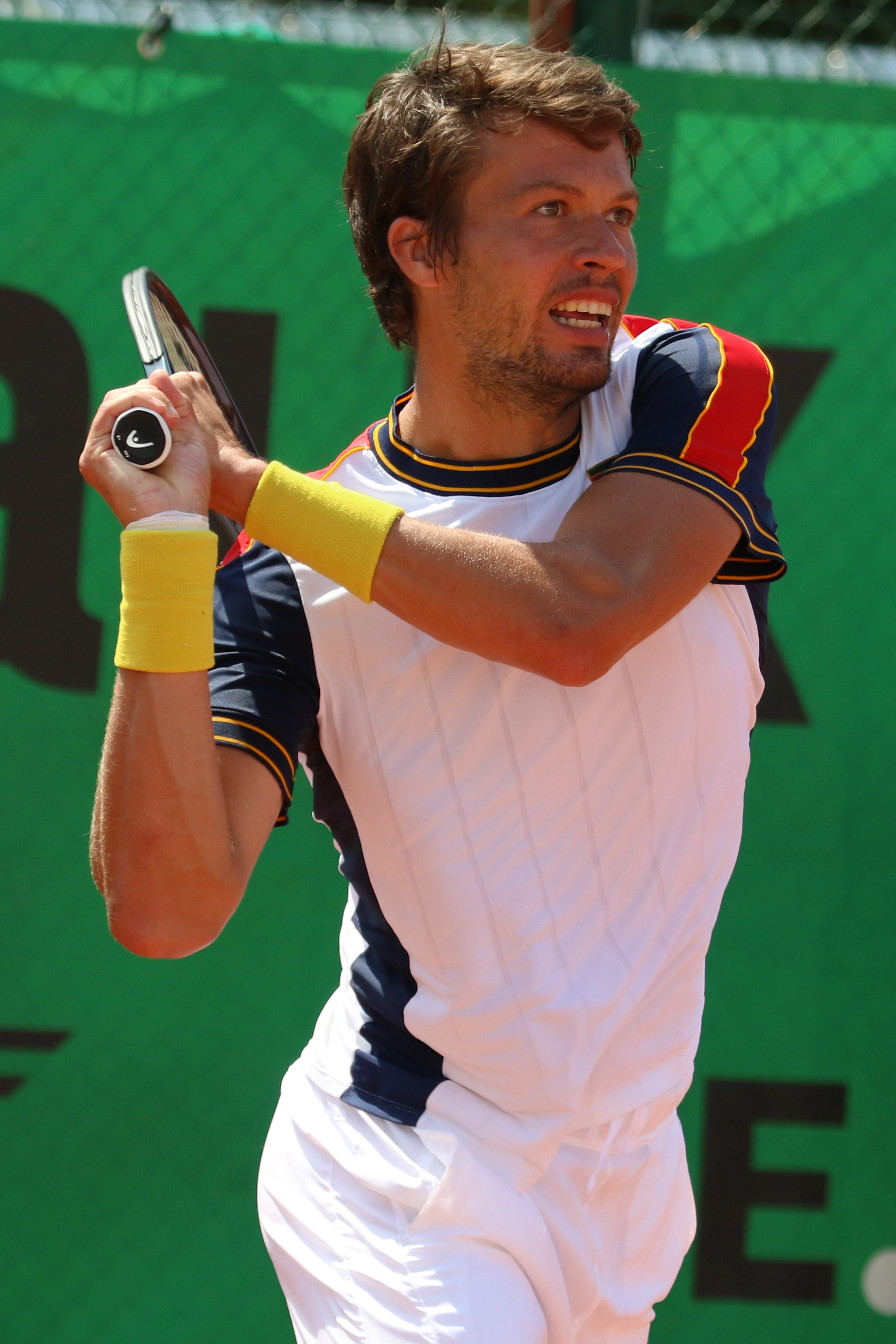
- Karlovskiy at the 2022 Internationaux de Tennis de Blois
- Full name: Evgeny Konstantinovich Karlovskiy
- Country (sports): Russia
- Residence: Moscow, Russia
- Born: 7 August 1994 (age 31) Moscow, Russia
- Height: 1.91 m (6 ft 3 in)
- Plays: Right-handed (two-handed backhand)
- Prize money: $422,903

Singles
- Career record: 0–1
- Career titles: 1 Challenger, 9 ITF
- Highest ranking: No. 211 (17 June 2019)
- Current ranking: No. 788 (3 November 2025)

Grand Slam singles results
- Australian Open: Q2 (2021)
- French Open: Q1 (2019)
- Wimbledon: Q3 (2019)
- US Open: Q2 (2018)

Doubles
- Career record: 1–3
- Career titles: 2 Challenger, 11 ITF
- Highest ranking: No. 222 (29 July 2019)
- Current ranking: No. 1,417 (3 November 2025)
- Last updated on: 8 November 2025.

Evgeny Konstantinovich Karlovskiy (Russian: Евге́ний Константи́нович Карло́вский, IPA: [jɪvˈɡʲenʲɪj kɐrˈlofskʲɪj]; born 7 August 1994) is a Russian tennis player.

Karlovskiy has a career high ATP singles ranking of No. 211 achieved on 17 June 2019 and a career high doubles ranking of No. 222 achieved on 29 July 2019. Karlovskiy has won 1 ATP Challenger singles title at the 2018 Nielsen Pro Tennis Championships.

== Challenger and Futures/World Tennis Tour finals ==
=== Singles: 20 (10–10) ===
Legend (singles) ATP Challenger Tour (1–2) ITF Futures/World Tennis Tour (9–8)	Titles by surface Hard (8–7) Clay (1–1) Grass (0–0) Carpet (1–2)

Result	W–L	Date	Tournament	Tier	Surface	Opponent	Score
Win	1–0	Mar 2015	Israel F1, Herzlia	Futures	Hard	(France) Martin Vaïsse	6–7^{(4–7)}, 6–1, 6–2
Loss	1–1	May 2015	Israel F4, Ashkelon	Futures	Hard	(Israel) Amir Weintraub	3–6, 4–6
Loss	1–2	Nov 2015	Estonia F2, Tartu	Futures	Carpet (i)	(Netherlands) Antal van der Duim	6–4, 1–6, 4–6
Win	2–2	Nov 2015	Kuwait F3, Meshref	Futures	Hard (i)	(Italy) Lorenzo Frigerio	7–6^{(7–3)}, 6–1
Win	3–2	Apr 2016	Qatar F1, Doha	Futures	Hard	(Switzerland) Adrien Bossel	7–6^{(7–4)}, 6–3
Loss	3–3	Jul 2016	Russia F2, Kazan	Futures	Clay	(Spain) Marc Giner	2–6, 6–4, 3–6
Loss	3–4	Nov 2016	Kuwait F3, Meshref	Futures	Hard	(Uzbekistan) Sanjar Fayziev	2–6, 6–7^{(6–8)}
Win	4–4	Jan 2017	Germany F1, Schwieberdingen	Futures	Carpet (i)	(Belarus) Yaraslav Shyla	2–6, 6–4, 6–4
Win	5–4	Jun 2017	Russia F1, Kazan	Futures	Hard	(Russia) Alexander Igoshin	3–6, 6–3, 7–5
Win	6–4	Aug 2017	Russia F7, Moscow	Futures	Clay	(Russia) Mikhail Elgin	6–2, 4–0 ret.
Loss	6–5	Oct 2017	Germany F15, Bad Salzdetfurth	Futures	Carpet (i)	(Germany) Marvin Möller	3–6, 7–5, 5–7
Loss	6–6	Nov 2017	Estonia F3, Tallinn	Futures	Hard (i)	(Russia) Evgenii Tiurnev	6–7^{(4–7)}, 3–6
Loss	6–7	Nov 2017	Finland F4, Helsinki	Futures	Hard (i)	(Finland) Emil Ruusuvuori	6–4, 0–6, 1–6
Win	7–7	Jul 2018	USA F19, Wichita	Futures	Hard	(Australia) Aleksandar Vukic	6–4, 6–4
Win	8–7	Jul 2018	Winnetka, USA	Challenger	Hard	(Chinese Taipei) Jason Jung	6–3, 6–2
Loss	8–8	Jul 2018	USA F19B, Iowa City	Futures	Hard	(United Kingdom) Lloyd Glasspool	6–7^{(2–7)}, 6–7^{(1–7)}
Loss	8–9	Mar 2019	Zhuhai, China, P.R.	Challenger	Hard	(Spain) Enrique López Pérez	1–6, 4–6
Win	9–9	Jul 2021	M25 Nur-Sultan, Kazakhstan	World Tennis Tour	Hard	(Chinese Taipei) Hsu Yu-hsiou	7-6^{(7-4)}, 2–6, 6-3
Loss	9–10	Nov 2021	Manama, Bahrain	Challenger	Hard	(India) Ramkumar Ramanathan	1–6, 4–6
Win	10–9	Mar 2024	M15 Aktobe, Kazakhstan	World Tennis Tour	Hard	(Bulgaria) Petr Nesterov	6-7^{(1-7)}, 6–1, 6-2

=== Doubles: 30 (13–17) ===
Legend (doubles) ATP Challenger Tour (2–6) ITF Futures Tour (11–11)	Titles by surface Hard (7–11) Clay (4–5) Grass (0–0) Carpet (2–1)

Result	W–L	Date	Tournament	Tier	Surface	Partner	Opponents	Score
Loss	0–1	Dec 2012	Hong Kong F1, Hong Kong	Futures	Hard	(Russia) Victor Baluda	(United States) Jason Jung (United States) Ryan Thacher	1–6, 1–6
Loss	0–2	Aug 2013	Russia F12, Moscow	Futures	Clay	(Israel) Igor Smilansky	(Belarus) Sergey Betov (Belarus) Aliaksandr Bury	1–6, 6–7^{(2–7)}
Win	1–2	Jun 2014	Croatia F11, Bol	Futures	Clay	(Croatia) Lovro Zovko	(Argentina) Tomás Lipovšek Puches (Japan) Ryusei Makiguchi	6–3, 6–3
Loss	1–3	Jul 2014	Belgium F8, Heist	Futures	Clay	(Germany) Tom Schönenberg	(Belgium) Julien Cagnina (Belgium) Sander Gillé	4–6, 5–7
Win	2–3	Aug 2014	Russia F7, Kazan	Futures	Hard	(Russia) Victor Baluda	(Russia) Andrey Saveliev (Russia) Mikhail Vaks	7–6^{(8–6)}, 6–3
Win	3–3	May 2015	Israel F4, Ashkelon	Futures	Hard	(Republic of Ireland) Sam Barry	(France) Hugo Grenier (Switzerland) Siméon Rossier	6–2, 5–7, [12–10]
Loss	3–4	May 2015	Israel F5, Ashkelon	Futures	Hard	(Republic of Ireland) Sam Barry	(Israel) Daniel Cukierman (Israel) Edan Leshem	5–7, 5–7
Loss	3–5	Oct 2015	Germany F15, Leimen	Futures	Hard (i)	(Poland) Andriej Kapaś	(Germany) Tom Schönenberg (Germany) Matthias Wunner	1–6, 1–6
Win	4–5	Nov 2015	Kuwait F3, Meshref	Futures	Hard (i)	(Russia) Alexander Igoshin	(Spain) Sergio Martos Gornés (Spain) Pol Toledo Bagué	6–1, 6–7^{(6–8)}, [10–5]
Loss	4–6	Jan 2016	Kazakhstan F1, Aktobe	Futures	Hard (i)	(Russia) Denis Matsukevitch	(Belarus) Yaraslav Shyla (Belarus) Andrei Vasilevski	3–6, 2–6
Win	5–6	Feb 2016	Azerbaijan F3, Baku	Futures	Carpet (i)	(Russia) Alexander Igoshin	(United Kingdom) Joe Cooper (Czech Republic) Michal Konečný	6–1, 6–4
Win	6–6	Jun 2016	Russia F1, Moscow	Futures	Clay	(Russia) Denis Matsukevitch	(Ukraine) Oleksandr Bielinskyi (Russia) Mikhail Fufygin	6–2, 6–3
Win	7–6	Aug 2016	Russia F6, Moscow	Futures	Clay	(Russia) Denis Matsukevitch	(Estonia) Vladimir Ivanov (Argentina) Matías Zukas	6–3, 2–6, [10–8]
Win	8–6	Sep 2016	Russia F6, St. Petersburg	Futures	Hard (i)	(Russia) Denis Matsukevitch	(Russia) Alexander Igoshin (Russia) Yan Sabanin	6–1, 6–2
Loss	8–7	Jan 2017	Germany F1, Schwieberdingen	Futures	Carpet (i)	(Belarus) Yaraslav Shyla	(Sweden) Isak Arvidsson (Sweden) Patrik Rosenholm	6–7^{(5–7)}, 6–3, [8–10]
Loss	8–8	Jul 2017	Astana, Kazakhstan	Challenger	Hard	(Russia) Evgenii Tiurnev	(Japan) Toshihide Matsui (India) Vishnu Vardhan	6–7^{(3–7)}, 7–6^{(7–5)}, [7–10]
Win	9–8	Oct 2017	Germany F15, Bad Salzdetfurth	Futures	Carpet (i)	(Russia) Alexander Igoshin	(Germany) Tom Schönenberg (Germany) Jakob Sude	6–3, 6–7^{(0–7)}, [12–10]
Win	10–8	Nov 2017	Finland F4, Helsinki	Futures	Hard (i)	(Egypt) Mohamed Safwat	(Russia) Vladimir Polyakov (Russia) Evgenii Tiurnev	7–6^{(7–2)}, 6–4
Loss	10–9	Oct 2018	Almaty, Kazakhstan	Challenger	Hard	(Kazakhstan) Timur Khabibulin	(Czech Republic) Zdeněk Kolář (Czech Republic) Lukáš Rosol	3–6, 1–6
Loss	10–10	Aug 2021	Prague, Czech Republic	Challenger	Hard	(Russia) Evgenii Tiurnev	(Czech Republic) Jonáš Forejtek (Czech Republic) Michael Vrbenský	1–6, 4–6
Loss	10–11	Feb 2022	M25 Nur-Sultan, Kazakhstan	World Tennis Tour	Hard	(Russia) Petr Bar Biryukov	(Belarus) Ivan Liutarevich (Ukraine) Vladyslav Manafov	3–6, 7–6^{(7–1)}, [9–11]
Win	11–11	Apr 2022	Barletta, Italy	Challenger	Clay	Evgenii Tiurnev	(Japan) Ben McLachlan (Poland) Szymon Walków	6–3, 6–4
Win	12–11	Oct 2022	Ortisei, Italy	Challenger	Hard (i)	(Uzbekistan) Denis Istomin	(Italy) Marco Bortolotti (Spain) Sergio Martos Gornés	6–3, 7–5
Loss	12–12	Jun 2023	M25 Poprad, Slovak Republic	World Tennis Tour	Clay	(Uzbekistan) Denis Istomin	(Ukraine) Vladyslav Orlov (Czech Republic) Daniel Paty	W/O
Win	13–12	Apr 2024	M15 Monastir, Tunisia	World Tennis Tour	Hard	(Uzbekistan) Denis Istomin	(United Kingdom) James Davis (United Kingdom) Giles Hussey	W/O
Loss	13–13	May 2024	M25 Kachreti, Georgia	World Tennis Tour	Hard	(Uzbekistan) Denis Istomin	(United Kingdom) Charles Broom (United Kingdom) Hamish Stewart	4–6, 4–6
Loss	13–14	May 2024	Kachreti, Georgia	Challenger	Hard	Evgenii Tiurnev	(United Kingdom) Charles Broom (United Kingdom) Ben Jones	6–3, 1–6, [8–10]
Loss	13–15	Jun 2024	M25 Bourg-en-Bresse, France	World Tennis Tour	Clay	(Uzbekistan) Denis Istomin	(France) Maxence Beauge (France) Lucas Bouquet	5–7, 7–5, [4–10]
Loss	13–16	Jul 2024	Troyes, France	Challenger	Clay	(Uzbekistan) Denis Istomin	(Austria) Neil Oberleitner (Switzerland) Jakub Paul	4–6, 6–7^{(1–7)}
Loss	13–17	Jul 2024	Astana, Kazakhstan	Challenger	Hard	(Uzbekistan) Denis Istomin	Egor Agofonov; Ilia Simakin	4–6, 3–6
