= Luka Gregorc =

Slovenian tennis player (born 1984)

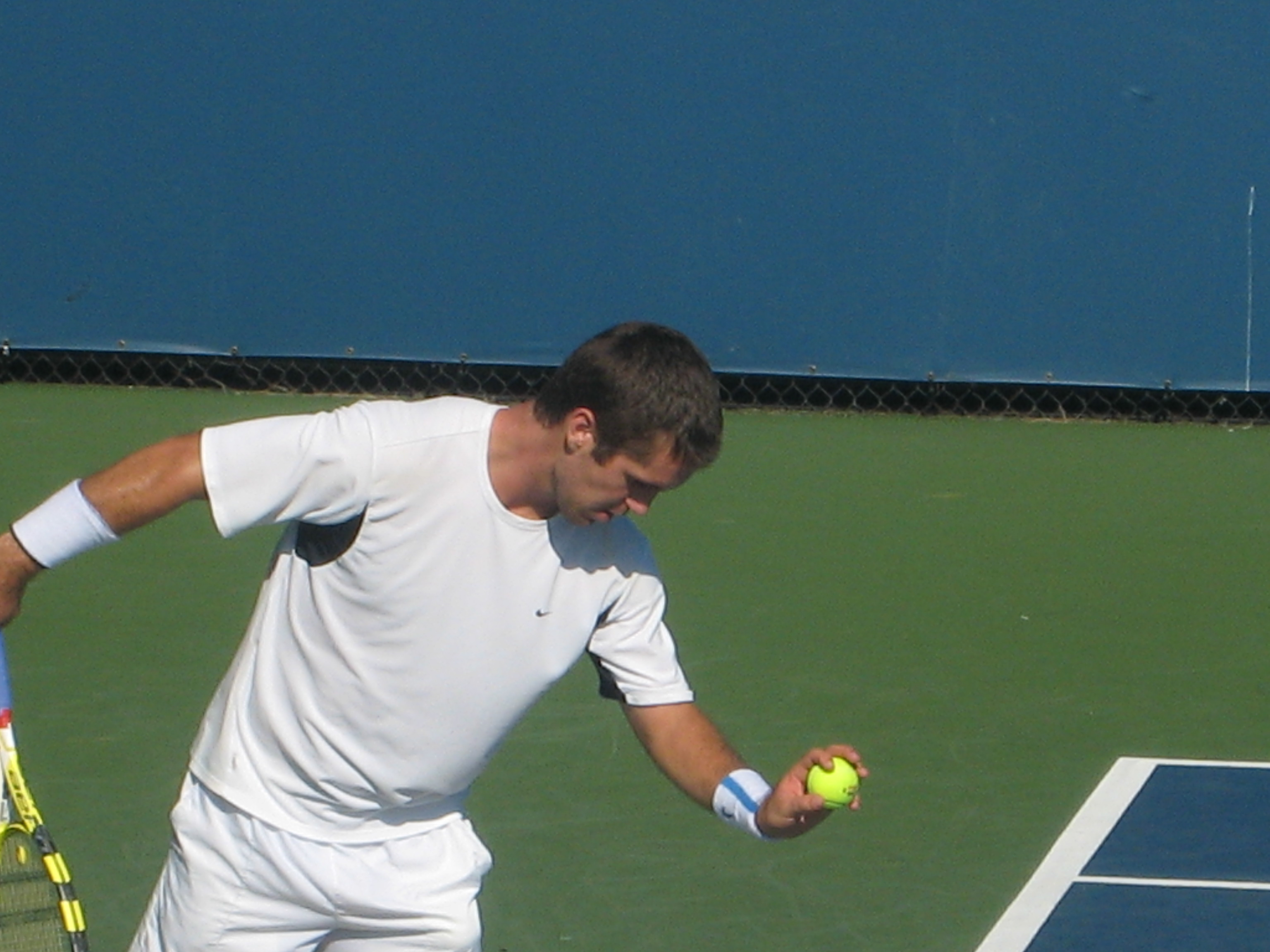
- Country (sports): Slovenia
- Residence: Boca Raton, Florida, United States
- Born: 14 February 1984 (age 42) Ljubljana, Slovenia
- Height: 1.90 m (6 ft 3 in)
- Turned pro: 1999
- Retired: 2013
- Plays: Right-handed
- Prize money: $176,066

Singles
- Career record: 9–11
- Career titles: 0
- Highest ranking: No. 172 (3 August 2009)

Grand Slam singles results
- Australian Open: Q1 (2009)
- French Open: Q2 (2009)
- Wimbledon: 1R (2009)
- US Open: Q2 (2009)

Doubles
- Career record: 5–3
- Career titles: 0
- Highest ranking: No. 557 (12 September 2005)

Luka Gregorc (born 14 February 1984) is a Slovenian former professional tennis player, who achieved a career-high singles ranking of No. 172 in August 2009.

== Career ==
=== Junior career ===
Gregorc's highest junior ranking was No. 9 in singles and No. 14 in doubles. He had success at junior Grand Slam tournaments, reaching the quarterfinals of the U.S. Open in 2001 and Wimbledon in 2002. In doubles, he reached the semifinals of Wimbledon in 2001 partnering Jamaica's Ryan Russell.

=== 1999–2007: Years leading to success ===
Gregorc entered his first professional tournament in Portorož, Slovenia, a Futures tournament, where he lost to Uros Vico of Italy, 6–1, 6–3, in the first round. He won his first match in his second tournament, another Futures tournament, this time located in Jamaica, before losing in the next round. In 2002, Gregorc reached a final in Montego Bay, Jamaica, but lost in the final to Brandon Wagner of the United States. He started to produce better results later on in the year, but in 2003 he didn't show as formidable tennis.

Gregorc played singles and doubles for Slovenia's Davis Cup team from 2004 through 2010, partnering Marko Tkalec once and Grega Žemlja multiple times. He posted a 1–2 singles record in the 2007 Davis Cup, beating his Estonian opponent Jürgen Zopp before losing two singles rubbers to Morocco's Younes El Aynaoui and Rabie Chaki. He has an overall 4–5 record in singles and doubles at the Davis Cup.

In July 2006, Gregorc won his first title at a Futures tournament in Venezuela, defeating home favorite Yohny Romero in the final, 1–6, 6–0, 6–3.

In September 2006, Gregorc qualified for the China Open in Beijing and defeated Wang Yu, to whom he had lost the previous year, to win his first ATP main-draw match. In the second round, he lost to second seed Nikolay Davydenko.

In doubles, Gregorc won a Futures tournament with Roger Anderson in Montego Bay in 2002 and at the Lagos Open in 2004, and also won a title alongside his coach Marcos Ondruska in South Korea in 2005.

=== 2008: Maiden ATP semifinal and Challenger final ===
In August, at the Pilot Pen Tennis tournament in New Haven, Connecticut, Gregorc qualified for the main draw and defeated several higher-ranked players en route to the semifinals: fellow qualifier Ramón Delgado, 14th seed José Acasuso, second seed Ivo Karlović, and seventh seed Andreas Seppi. In the semifinal match, he lost to eventual champion Marin Čilić.

In November, Gregorc competed at the Knoxville Challenger and defeated fifth seed Kevin Anderson and sixth seed Frank Dancevic to reach his maiden Challenger final, where he lost to second seed Bobby Reynolds.

=== 2009: Grand Slam main-draw debut ===
At the Wimbledon Championships, Gregorc won three matches in the qualifying competition and became the first male Slovenian player in history to qualify for the main draw of a Grand Slam. In the first round, he lost to 15th seed Tommy Rebredo in four sets.

=== 2012 ===
Gregorc played for the Philadelphia Freedoms in World Team Tennis.

== Singles performance timeline ==
Key
W	F	SF	QF	#R	RR	Q#	DNQ	A	NH

(W) winner; (F) finalist; (SF) semifinalist; (QF) quarterfinalist; (#R) rounds 4, 3, 2, 1; (RR) round-robin stage; (Q#) qualification round; (DNQ) did not qualify; (A) absent; (NH) not held; (SR) strike rate (events won / competed); (W–L) win–loss record.

Tournament	2005	2006	2007	2008	2009	2010	2011	2012	Career win–loss
Grand Slam tournaments									
Australian's Open	A	A	A	A	LQ	A	A	A	0–0
French Open	A	A	A	A	LQ	A	A	A	0–0
Wimbledon	A	A	A	A	1R	A	A	A	0–1
US Open	A	A	A	A	LQ	A	A	A	0–0
Win–loss	0–0	0–0	0–0	0–0	0–1	0–0	0–0	0–0	0–1
ATP World Tour 500									
Tokyo	A	A	2R	1R	LQ	A	A	A	1–2
Win–loss	0–0	0–0	1–1	0–1	0–0	0–0	0–0	0–0	1–2
ATP World Tour 250									
Delray Beach	A	A	A	1R	LQ	LQ	A	A	0–1
New Haven	A	A	LQ	SF	A	A	A	A	4–1
Beijing	1R	2R	LQ	A	A	A	A	A	1–2
Win–loss	0–1	1–1	0–0	4–2	0–0	0–0	0–0	0–0	5–4

- Statistics correct as of August 27, 2012
