= Jeff Dadamo =

American tennis player

- Country (sports): United States
- Born: July 17, 1989 (age 35); Florida, United States
- Turned pro: 2010
- Plays: Left Handed
- Prize money: $40,028

Singles
- Career record: 0–0
- Highest ranking: No. 480 (October 15, 2012)

Doubles
- Career record: 0–1
- Highest ranking: No. 429 (February 4, 2013)

Grand Slam doubles results
- US Open: 1R (2011)
- Last updated on: July 3, 2017.

Jeff Dadamo (born July 17, 1989) is an American former professional tennis player who competed mainly on the ATP Challenger Tour and ITF Futures, both in singles and doubles.

Dadamo reached his highest ATP singles ranking, No. 480, on October 15, 2012, and his highest ATP doubles ranking, No. 429, on February 4, 2013.

== Career finals (1) ==
=== Doubles (1) ===
Legend ATP Challengers (1)	Finals by surface Hard (1–0) Clay (0–0) Grass (0–0) Carpet (0–0)

Outcome	W–L	Date	Tournament	Surface	Partnering	Opponents in the final	Score
Winner	1–0	Jul 2012	Winnetka, United States	Hard	(United States) Devin Britton	(Australia) John Peers (Australia) John-Patrick Smith	1–6, 6–2, [10–6]
