= Tom Fawcett =

American tennis player

- Country (sports): United States
- Residence: Winnetka, United States
- Born: 18 October 1995 (age 30) Skokie, United States
- Height: 1.96 m (6 ft 5 in)
- Plays: Right-handed
- College: Stanford
- Prize money: $41,311

Singles
- Career record: 0–1 (at ATP Tour level, Grand Slam level, and in Davis Cup)
- Career titles: 1 ITF
- Highest ranking: No. 440 (7 January 2019)

Grand Slam singles results
- US Open: Q1 (2018)

Doubles
- Career record: 0–0 (at ATP Tour level, Grand Slam level, and in Davis Cup)
- Career titles: 0 ITF
- Highest ranking: No. 602 (15 July 2019)

Grand Slam mixed doubles results
- US Open: 1R (2018)
- Last updated on: 27 August 2018.

Tom Fawcett (born 18 October 1995) is an American tennis player.

Fawcett has a career high ATP singles ranking of 440 achieved on 7 January 2019. He also has a career high ATP doubles ranking of 602 achieved on 15 July 2019.

Fawcett made his Grand Slam main draw debut at the 2018 US Open after receiving a wildcard into the qualifying singles draw, and mixed doubles main draw with Danielle Collins.
