= Tim Smyczek =

American tennis player

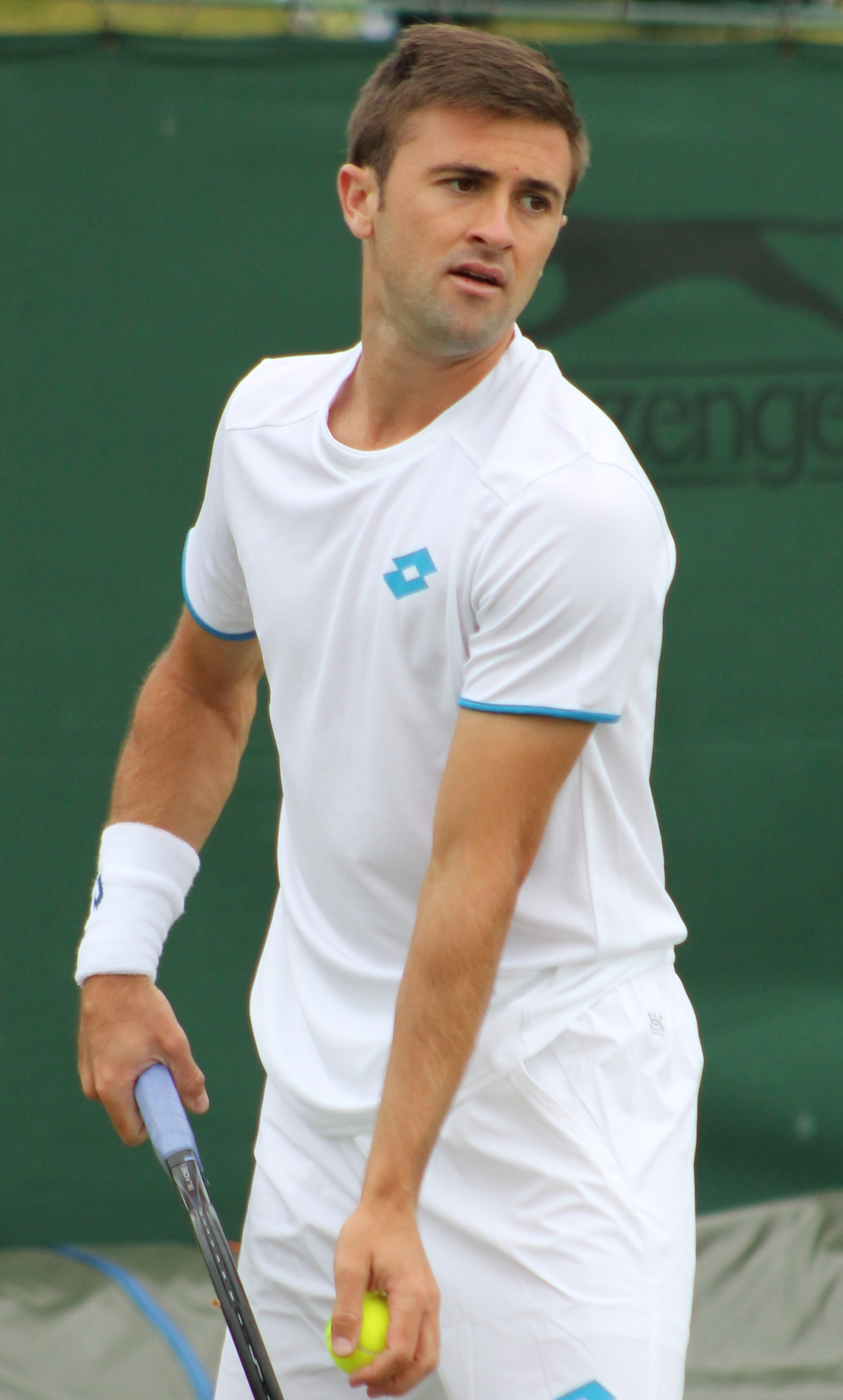
- Smyczek at the 2014 Wimbledon Championships
- Country (sports): United States
- Residence: Dallas, Texas, US
- Born: December 30, 1987 (age 38) Milwaukee, Wisconsin, US
- Height: 5 ft 9 in (1.75 m)
- Turned pro: 2006
- Retired: 2019
- Plays: Right-handed (two-handed backhand)
- Prize money: $2,067,979

Singles
- Career record: 43–85
- Career titles: 0
- Highest ranking: No. 68 (April 6, 2015)

Grand Slam singles results
- Australian Open: 2R (2013, 2015, 2016, 2018)
- French Open: 1R (2011, 2015)
- Wimbledon: 1R (2015)
- US Open: 3R (2013)

Doubles
- Career record: 8–11
- Career titles: 0
- Highest ranking: No. 160 (24 February 2014)

Grand Slam doubles results
- Wimbledon: 1R (2013, 2015)
- US Open: 3R (2014)

Timothy Allen Salazar Smyczek (/ˈsmiːtʃɛk/ SMEE-chek; Polish pronunciation: [ˈsmɨtʂɛk]; born December 30, 1987) is an American former professional tennis player. He made three quarterfinals on the main tour as well as the semi-finals of Newport in 2018. Additionally he won seven Challenger titles. He achieved a career-high singles ranking of World No. 68 in April 2015. Smyczek recorded wins over several notable players in his career including Kei Nishikori, John Isner, Ivo Karlović, Sam Querrey, Robby Ginepri, Gilles Müller, and Benjamin Becker.

== Personal life ==
Smyczek is good friends with Mardy Fish. He is also a Catholic and a cooperator of Opus Dei. On November 21, 2015, Smyczek married Ana Pier.

== Tennis career ==
=== Juniors ===
As a junior, Smyczek reached as high as No. 14 in the world combined rankings in January 2005.

=== Pro tour ===
Smyczek reached the quarterfinals of the SAP Open in 2011, beating Kei Nishikori en route, but lost to Gaël Monfils. He qualified again in 2012, but lost to Mardy Fish in the first round.

In April 2012, he won his first Challenger title, defeating Frank Dancevic in the Tallahassee final, Dancevic retiring after losing the first set 5–7.

For the 2013 Australian Open, Smyczek earned entry as the last entry in the field and lucky loser, the highest-ranked player (ATP ranking of no. 128) who lost in the finals of qualifying. After beating Ivo Karlović in the first round, he lost to world no. 4 David Ferrer in the second round in four sets.

Tim lost the first round of the 2013 French Open qualifying. He fared better at Wimbledon; he made it to the third round of qualifying for the first time, losing to Matt Reid in four sets. Tim reached the doubles final of the 2013 Hall of Fame Tennis Championships with Rhyne Williams as his partner. In the final the American duo fell to Nicolas Mahut and his partner and fellow Frenchmen Edouard Roger-Vasselin. Tim made it to the third round of the Citi Open. He qualified for the Rogers Cup and made it to the second round.

At the 2015 Australian Open, Smyczek entered the main draw as a qualifier, and lost in a four-hour match that ended 7–5 in the fifth set against World No. 3 Rafael Nadal in the second round. In the final game of the match, he graciously allowed Nadal to repeat a crucial first serve when Nadal’s serve landed out, possibly due to a disturbance by a member of the crowd. Smyczek (not the chair umpire) initiated the decision for Nadal to repeat the first serve. Smyczek’s sportsmanship resulted in praise from Nadal and the crowd after the match. He would go on to achieve his career high rank of 68 in April.

In 2016 Smyczek made the quarterfinals in Houston and Delray Beach.

In 2018 Smyczek attained his best main tour result by reaching the semi-finals of Newport.

In 2019 Smyczek announced his plans to retire after the U.S. Open but was not granted a wild card. His last match was at the Citi Open.

== ATP career finals ==
=== Doubles: 1 (1 runner-up) ===
Legend Grand Slam Tournaments (0–0) ATP World Tour Finals (0–0) ATP World Tour Masters 1000 (0–0) ATP World Tour 500 Series (0–0) ATP World Tour 250 Series (0–1)	Titles by surface Hard (0–0) Clay (0–0) Grass (0–1) Carpet (0–0)

Result	W–L	Date	Tournament	Tier	Surface	Partner	Opponents	Score
Loss	0–1	Jul 2013	Campbell's Hall of Fame Tennis Championships, United States	250 Series	Grass	(United States) Rhyne Williams	(France) Nicolas Mahut (France) Édouard Roger-Vasselin	7–6^{(7–4)}, 2–6, [5–10]

== Challenger tournament finals ==
=== Singles (7–6) ===
Outcome	W–L	Date	Tournament	Surface	Opponent	Score
Runner-up	0–1	June 29, 2009	Winnetka, US	Hard	(United States) Alex Kuznetsov	4–6, 6–7^{(1–7)}
Runner-up	0–2	March 22, 2010	Rimouski, Canada	Hard	(South Africa) Rik de Voest	0–6, 5–7
Runner-up	0–3	July 3, 2010	Winnetka, US	Hard	(Argentina) Brian Dabul	1–6, 6–1, 1–6
Winner	1–3	April 2, 2012	Tallahassee, US	Hard	(Canada) Frank Dancevic	7–5 RET
Winner	2–3	November 17, 2012	Champaign, US	Hard(i)	(United States) Jack Sock	2–6, 7–6^{(7–1)}, 7–5
Runner-up	2–4	September 30, 2013	Sacramento, US	Hard	(United States) Donald Young	5–7, 3–6
Winner	3–4	November 10, 2013	Knoxville, US	Hard	(Canada) Peter Polansky	6–4, 6–2
Runner-up	3–5	September 28, 2014	Napa, US	Hard	(United States) Sam Querrey	3–6, 1–6
Winner	4–5	February 7, 2015	Dallas, US	Hard(i)	(United States) Rajeev Ram	6–2, 4–1 RET
Runner-up	4–6	March 22, 2015	Irving, US	Hard	(Slovenia) Aljaž Bedene	6–7^{(3–7)}, 6–3, 3–6
Winner	5–6	October 4, 2015	Tiburon, US	Hard	(United States) Denis Kudla	1–6, 6–1, 7–6^{(9–7)}
Winner	6–6	November 5, 2017	Charlottesville, US	Hard	(United States) Tennys Sandgren	6–7^{(5–7)}, 6–3, 6–2
Winner	7–6	November 19, 2017	Champaign, US	Hard	(United States) Bjorn Fratangelo	6–2, 6–4

=== Doubles (0–1) ===
Outcome	W–L	Date	Tournament	Surface	Partner	Opponents	Score
Runner-up	0–1	April 28, 2013	Savannah, US	Clay	(United States) Michael Russell	(Russia) Teymuraz Gabashvili (Ukraine) Denys Molchanov	2–6, 5–7

== Singles performance timeline ==
Key
W	F	SF	QF	#R	RR	Q#	DNQ	A	NH

(W) winner; (F) finalist; (SF) semifinalist; (QF) quarterfinalist; (#R) rounds 4, 3, 2, 1; (RR) round-robin stage; (Q#) qualification round; (DNQ) did not qualify; (A) absent; (NH) not held; (SR) strike rate (events won / competed); (W–L) win–loss record.

Tournament	2006	2007	2008	2009	2010	2011	2012	2013	2014	2015	2016	2017	2018	2019	SR	W–L	Win %
Grand Slam tournaments
Australian Open	A	A	A	A	A	Q2	Q3	2R	1R	2R	2R	Q3	2R	Q3	0 / 4	4–5	44%
French Open	A	A	A	A	A	1R	Q1	Q1	Q3	1R	Q1	Q2	Q1	Q1	0 / 2	0–2	0%
Wimbledon	A	A	A	A	Q1	A	Q2	Q3	Q3	1R	Q2	Q2	A	Q2	0 / 1	0–1	0%
US Open	A	A	Q1	Q2	1R	Q1	2R	3R	2R	1R	Q2	1R	1R	A	0 / 7	4–7	36%
Win–loss	0–0	0–0	0–0	0–0	0–1	0–1	1–1	3–2	1–2	1–4	1–1	0–1	1–2	0–0	0 / 15	8–15	35%
ATP Tour Masters 1000
Indian Wells Masters	A	A	A	A	1R	2R	1R	1R	2R	2R	1R	Q1	2R	A	0 / 8	4–8	33%
Miami Open	A	A	A	A	A	Q2	Q1	1R	Q1	2R	3R	1R	Q1	A	0 / 4	3–4	43%
Canadian Open	A	A	A	A	Q2	A	A	Q1	2R	Q1	1R	1R	Q1	A	0 / 3	1–3	33%
Cincinnati Masters	A	A	A	A	Q2	Q1	A	Q2	Q2	Q1	Q1	Q1	Q2	A	0 / 0	0–0	–
Shanghai Masters	A	A	A	A	A	A	A	A	A	A	A	A	Q1	A	0 / 0	0–0	–
Win–loss	0–0	0–0	0–0	0–0	0–1	1–1	0–1	0–2	2–2	2–2	2–3	0–2	1–1	0–0	0 / 15	8–15	35%
Career statistics
Tournaments	0	0	1	0	4	6	6	11	12	13	10	7	12	3	Career total: 85		
Overall win–loss	0–0	0–0	0–1	0–0	1–4	3–6	3–6	8–11	7–12	5–13	8–10	1–7	6–12	1–3	0 / 85	43–85	34%
Year-end ranking	581	714	349	280	171	273	128	89	115	109	140	130	164	355			
