= Nielsen Pro Tennis Championship =

Defunct tennis tournament
- Event name: Winnetka
- Location: Winnetka, Illinois, USA
- Venue: A. C. Nielsen Tennis Center (a facility of the Winnetka Park District)
- Category: ATP Challenger Tour
- Surface: Hard, outdoors
- Draw: 32S/4Q/16D
- Prize money: $75,000

The Nielsen Pro Tennis Championship was a tennis tournament held intermittently in Winnetka, Illinois, USA from 1984 until 2019. The event was part of the ATP Challenger Tour and was played on outdoor hardcourts at the A. C. Nielsen Tennis Center, a facility owned and operated by the Winnetka Park District.

== Past finals ==
=== Singles ===
Year	Champion	Runner-up	Score
1984	(United States) Marc Flur	(United States) Mike Leach	6–3, 6–4
1985	(South Africa) Barry Moir	(United States) Harold Solomon	2–6, 7–5, 6–2
1986	not held		
1987	(Australia) Simon Youl	(Argentina) Roberto Saad	5–7, 7–6, 6–3
1988	(United States) Jeff Tarango	(Italy) Gianluca Pozzi	7–5, 5–7, 6–2
1989	(United States) Brian Garrow	(United States) Todd Martin	6–4, 6–2
1990	(Italy) Cristiano Caratti	(United States) Chris Garner	7–6, 6–1
1991	(Zimbabwe) Byron Black	(United States) Todd Martin	6–4, 4–6, 6–2
1992	(United States) Chuck Adams	(United States) Steve Bryan	6–4, 6–4
1993	(Zimbabwe) Kevin Ullyett	(Venezuela) Maurice Ruah	6–3, 6–2
1994	(United States) Vince Spadea	(Italy) Cristiano Caratti	6–1, 4–6, 7–5
1995-96	not held		
1997	(Italy) Gianluca Pozzi	(Zimbabwe) Wayne Black	6–4, 6–2
1998	(United States) Geoff Grant	(Italy) Diego Nargiso	5–7, 6–3, 7–5
1999	(United States) Alex O'Brien	(Belarus) Max Mirnyi	6–2, 6–2
2000	(Japan) Takao Suzuki	(South Korea) Yoon Yong-Il	6–2, 6–4
2001-05	not held		
2006	(United States) Sam Querrey	(Italy) Andrea Stoppini	6–2, 6–3
2007	(Israel) Noam Okun	(South Africa) Kevin Anderson	6–4, 6–3
2008	(United States) Rajeev Ram	(United States) Scoville Jenkins	7–5, 6–4
2009	(United States) Alex Kuznetsov	(United States) Tim Smyczek	6–4, 7–6(1)
2010	(Argentina) Brian Dabul	(United States) Tim Smyczek	6–1, 1–6, 6–1
2011	(United States) James Blake	(United States) Bobby Reynolds	6–3, 6–1
2012	(Australia) John-Patrick Smith	(Lithuania) Ričardas Berankis	3–6, 6–3, 7–6^{(7–3)}
2013	(United States) Jack Sock	(United States) Bradley Klahn	6–4, 6–2
2014	(United States) Denis Kudla	(Uzbekistan) Farrukh Dustov	6–2, 6–2
2015	(India) Somdev Devvarman	(United States) Daniel Nguyen	7–5, 4–6, 7–6^{(7–5)}
2016	(Japan) Yoshihito Nishioka	(United States) Frances Tiafoe	6–3, 6–2
2017	(Japan) Akira Santillan	(India) Ramkumar Ramanathan	7–6^{(7–1)}, 6–2
2018	(Russia) Evgeny Karlovskiy	(Chinese Taipei) Jason Jung	6–3, 6–2
2019	(United States) Bradley Klahn	(Australia) Jason Kubler	6–2, 7–5

=== Doubles ===
Year	Champion	Runner-up	Score
1984	(United States) Dan Goldie (United States) Michael Kures	(Chile) Ricardo Acuña (Chile) Belus Prajoux	3–6, 6–4, 7–5
1985	(United States) Ricky Brown (United States) Luke Jensen	(New Zealand) Kelly Evernden (South Africa) Brian Levine	6–4, 6–7, 6–4
1986	not held		
1987	(Sweden) Tobias Svantesson (United States) Jon Treml	(South Africa) Pieter Aldrich (South Africa) Warren Green	6–3, 6–4
1988	(Chile) Ricardo Acuña (South Africa) Royce Deppe	(United States) Jared Palmer (United States) Pete Sampras	6–4, 6–4
1989	(Sweden) Ville Jansson (United States) Scott Warner	(United States) Bill Benjes (United States) Arkie Engle	6–7, 6–4, 6–4
1990	(India) Zeeshan Ali (Netherlands) Menno Oosting	(United States) Doug Flach (Mexico) Luis Herrera	4–6, 6–3, 6–2
1991	(Zimbabwe) Byron Black (United States) Scott Melville	(United States) Keith Evans (United States) Dave Randall	6–4, 4–6, 6–2
1992	(Australia) Andrew Kratzmann (Australia) Roger Rasheed	(United States) Rick Witsken (United States) Todd Witsken	6–3, 3–6, 6–3
1993	(Australia) Wayne Arthurs (United Kingdom) Mark Petchey	(Australia) Pat Rafter (Australia) Sandon Stolle	7–6, 6–7, 6–4
1994	(United States) Brian MacPhie (United States) David Witt	(United States) Doug Flach (United States) Wade McGuire	7–5, 6–2
1995-96	not held		
1997	(United States) Michael Sell (South Africa) Myles Wakefield	(United States) Chad Clark (Australia) Ben Ellwood	6–3, 7–6
1998	(Australia) Grant Silcock (South Africa) Myles Wakefield	(United States) Geoff Grant (United States) Mark Merklein	1–6, 7–6, 7–6
1999	(United States) James Blake (United States) Thomas Blake	(Belarus) Max Mirnyi (United States) Alexander Reichel	6–4, 6–7, 6–3
2000	(South Korea) Lee Hyung-taik (South Korea) Yoon Yong-il	(Australia) Matthew Breen (Australia) Luke Smith	2–6, 7–5, 6–3
2001-05	not held		
2006	(United States) Cecil Mamiit (United States) Eric Taino	(United States) Scoville Jenkins (United States) Rajeev Ram	6–2, 6–4
2007	(United States) Patrick Briaud (United States) Chris Drake	(United States) Nicholas Monroe (South Africa) Izak van der Merwe	7–6, 6–4
2008	(United States) Todd Widom (United States) Michael Yani	(Chinese Taipei) Chen Ti (New Zealand) Jose Statham	6–2, 6–2
2009	(Australia) Carsten Ball (United States) Travis Rettenmaier	(United States) Brett Joelson (United States) Ryan Sweeting	6–1, 6–2
2010	(United States) Ryler DeHeart (Canada) Pierre-Ludovic Duclos	(South Africa) Rik de Voest (India) Somdev Devvarman	7–6(4), 4–6, [10–8]
2011	(Philippines) Treat Conrad Huey (United States) Bobby Reynolds	(Australia) Jordan Kerr (United States) Travis Parrott	7–6^{(9–7)}, 6–4
2012	(United States) Devin Britton (United States) Jeff Dadamo	(Australia) John Peers (Australia) John-Patrick Smith	1–6, 6–2, [10–6]
2013	(India) Yuki Bhambri (New Zealand) Michael Venus	(India) Somdev Devvarman (United States) Jack Sock	2–6, 6–2, [10–8]
2014	(Australia) Thanasi Kokkinakis (United States) Denis Kudla	(United States) Evan King (United States) Raymond Sarmiento	6–2, 7–6^{(7–4)}
2015	(Sweden) Johan Brunström (United States) Nicholas Monroe	(United States) Sekou Bangoura (Canada) Frank Dancevic	4–6, 6–3, [10–8]
2016	(United States) Stefan Kozlov (Australia) John-Patrick Smith	(United States) Sekou Bangoura (Republic of Ireland) David O'Hare	6–3, 6–3
2017	(Thailand) Sanchai Ratiwatana (Indonesia) Christopher Rungkat	(United States) Kevin King (United States) Bradley Klahn	7–6^{(7–4)}, 6–2
2018	(United States) Austin Krajicek (India) Jeevan Nedunchezhiyan	(Venezuela) Roberto Maytín (Indonesia) Christopher Rungkat	6–7^{(4–7)}, 6–4, [10–5]
2019	(United States) JC Aragone (United States) Bradley Klahn	(United States) Christopher Eubanks (United States) Thai-Son Kwiatkowski	7–5, 6–4
