= 2014 Tallahassee Tennis Challenger – Doubles =

Doubles
- 2014 Tallahassee Tennis Challenger

Final
- Champions: (Australia) Ryan Agar (Austria) Sebastian Bader
- Runners-up: (United States) Bjorn Fratangelo (United States) Mitchell Krueger
- Score: 6-4, 7-6^{(7-3)}

Events
| Singles | Doubles |
- Tallahassee Tennis Challenger

Austin Krajicek and Tennys Sandgren were the defending champions. but decided not to compete.

Ryan Agar and Sebastian Bader won the title, defeating Bjorn Fratangelo and Mitchell Krueger in the final, 6–4, 7-6^{(7-3)}.

== Seeds ==
1. (United States) Tim Smyczek / (United States) Rhyne Williams (withdrew)
2. (United Kingdom) David Rice / (United Kingdom) Sean Thornley (first round)
3. (Croatia) Franko Škugor / (Croatia) Antonio Veić (quarterfinals)
4. (United States) Sekou Bangoura / (United States) Evan King (quarterfinals)

== Draw ==
Key

- Q = Qualifier
- WC = Wild card
- LL = Lucky loser
- Alt = Alternate
- ITF = ITF entry
- PR = Protected ranking
- SR = Special ranking
- SE = Special exempt
- JE = Junior exempt
- JR = Junior Accelerator Programme entrant
- CO = College Accelerator Programme entrant
- NG = Next Gen Accelerator Program entrant
- w/o = Walkover
- r = Retired
- d = Defaulted

=== Draw ===
First round
Alt | (United States) Terrell Whitehurst (United States) Terrence Whitehurst | w/o
(United States) A Kuznetsov (United States) B Reynolds
WC | (Zimbabwe) B Lock (Mexico) Marco Aurelio Núñez | 3 | 7^{7} | [7]
(Australia) R Agar (Austria) S Bader | 6 | 6^{2} | [10]
4 | (United States) S Bangoura (United States) E King | 6 | 7
(Zimbabwe) T Garanganga (India) S Singh | 4 | 5
(Barbados) D King (Japan) Y Nishioka | 6 | 6
Q | (Austria) Philip Lang (Austria) G Melzer | 4 | 2
PR | (United States) Adham El-Effendi (United Kingdom) D Walsh | 6 | 7^{7}
WC | (United States) C Altamirano (United States) A Rybakov | 4 | 6^{1}
(Serbia) I Bozoljac (New Zealand) M Venus | 6 | 4 | [7]
3 | (Croatia) F Škugor (Croatia) A Veić | 3 | 6 | [10]
WC | (United States) B Fratangelo (United States) M Krueger | 6 | 6
(United States) Jean-Yves Aubone (United States) V Mirzadeh | 4 | 3
(Australia) T Kokkinakis (Australia) J Kubler | 6 | 7
2 | (United Kingdom) D Rice (United Kingdom) S Thornley | 1 | 5

Quarterfinals
Alt | (United States) T Whitehurst (United States) T Whitehurst | 4 | 0
(Australia) R Agar (Austria) S Bader | 6 | 6
4 | (United States) S Bangoura (United States) E King | 4 | 6 | [8]
(Barbados) D King (Japan) Y Nishioka | 6 | 2 | [10]
PR | (United States) A El-Effendi (United Kingdom) D Walsh | 6 | 2 | [10]
3 | (Croatia) F Škugor (Croatia) A Veić | 2 | 6 | [7]
WC | (United States) B Fratangelo (United States) M Krueger | 6^{4} | 2
(Australia) T Kokkinakis (Australia) J Kubler | 7^{7} | 2^{r}

Semifinals
(Australia) R Agar (Austria) S Bader | 6 | 4 | [12]
(Barbados) D King (Japan) Y Nishioka | 3 | 6 | [10]
PR | (United States) A El-Effendi (United Kingdom) D Walsh | 4 | 3
WC | (United States) B Fratangelo (United States) M Krueger | 6 | 6

Final
(Australia) R Agar (Austria) S Bader | 6 | 7^{7}
WC | (United States) B Fratangelo (United States) M Krueger | 4 | 6^{3}
