= 2018 Tallahassee Tennis Challenger – Singles =

Singles
- 2018 Tallahassee Tennis Challenger

Final
- Champion: (United States) Noah Rubin
- Runner-up: (Australia) Marc Polmans
- Score: 6–2, 3–6, 6–4

Events
Singles	Doubles
← 2017 ·	Tallahassee Tennis Challenger	· 2019 →

Blaž Rola was the defending champion but lost in the first round to Marc Polmans.

Noah Rubin won the title after defeating Polmans 6–2, 3–6, 6–4 in the final.

== Seeds ==
1. (United States) Denis Kudla (second round)
2. (Canada) Peter Polansky (second round)
3. (Switzerland) Henri Laaksonen (first round)
4. (United States) Michael Mmoh (quarterfinals)
5. (Slovenia) Blaž Rola (first round)
6. (Australia) Akira Santillan (first round)
7. (United States) Evan King (first round)
8. (Serbia) Miomir Kecmanović (second round)

== Draw ==
=== Key ===
- Q = Qualifier
- WC = Wild card
- LL = Lucky loser
- Alt = Alternate
- SE = Special exempt
- PR = Protected ranking
- ITF = ITF entry
- JE = Junior exempt
- w/o = Walkover
- r = Retired
- d = Defaulted
- SR = Special ranking

=== Finals ===
Semifinals
(United States) Noah Rubin	6	6
(Bolivia) Hugo Dellien	2	4
(Australia) Marc Polmans	6	6
Q	(Australia) Max Purcell	1	2

Final
(United States) Noah Rubin	6	3	6
(Australia) Marc Polmans	2	6	4

=== Top half ===
First round
1	(United States) D Kudla	3	6	7
(Argentina) F Bagnis	6	1	5
(Germany) D Köpfer	6^{3}	2
(United States) N Rubin	7^{7}	6
(Brazil) G Clezar	6	6
(Italy) A Arnaboldi	2	4
(Chile) C Garín	6	6
7	(United States) E King	0	3
3	(Switzerland) H Laaksonen	3	6^{5}
(United States) M Krueger	6	7^{7}
(Spain) E López Pérez	5	2
(Bolivia) H Dellien	7	6
WC	(United States) D Thomas	1	2
(Brazil) T Bellucci	6	6
WC	(Tunisia) A Dougaz	2	4
8	(Serbia) M Kecmanović	6	6

Second round
1	(United States) D Kudla	2	4
(United States) N Rubin	6	6
(Brazil) G Clezar	4	2
(Chile) C Garín	6	6
(United States) M Krueger	3	2
(Bolivia) H Dellien	6	6
(Brazil) T Bellucci	6	6
8	(Serbia) M Kecmanović	3	2

Quarterfinals
(United States) N Rubin	6	6
(Chile) C Garín	3	4
(Bolivia) H Dellien	7	7^{7}
(Brazil) T Bellucci	5	6^{2}

Semifinals
(United States) N Rubin	6	6
(Bolivia) H Dellien	2	4

=== Bottom half ===
First round
5	(Slovenia) B Rola	0	3
(Australia) M Polmans	6	6
Q	(Argentina) F Coria	6	6
Q	(United States) T Bryde	0	1
(United States) C Harrison	3	6	2
(United Kingdom) J Clarke	6	3	6
WC	(United States) Jared Hiltzik	2	6^{9}
4	(United States) M Mmoh	6	7^{11}
6	(Australia) A Santillan	7	6^{9}	3
WC	(United States) JC Aragone	5	7^{11}	6
Q	(Australia) M Purcell	6	3	7^{8}
Q	(Japan) Y Nishioka	2	6	6^{6}
(Germany) J Choinski	6	4	1
SE	(Argentina) JI Londero	1	6	6
LL	(Brazil) JP Sorgi	6^{6}	6^{6}
2	(Canada) P Polansky	7^{8}	7^{8}

Second round
(Australia) M Polmans	6^{4}	6	3
Q	(Argentina) F Coria	7^{7}	2	1^{r}
(United Kingdom) J Clarke	2	3
4	(United States) M Mmoh	6	6
WC	(United States) JC Aragone	6^{1}	2
Q	(Australia) M Purcell	7^{7}	6
SE	(Argentina) JI Londero	6	6
2	(Canada) P Polansky	3	3

Quarterfinals
(Australia) M Polmans	5	6	7^{7}
4	(United States) M Mmoh	7	0	6^{0}
Q	(Australia) M Purcell	1	6	7
SE	(Argentina) JI Londero	6	3	5

Semifinals
(Australia) M Polmans	6	6
Q	(Australia) M Purcell	1	2
