= 2022 Tallahassee Tennis Challenger – Doubles =

Doubles
- 2022 Tallahassee Tennis Challenger

Final
- Champions: (Netherlands) Gijs Brouwer (United States) Christian Harrison
- Runners-up: (Ecuador) Diego Hidalgo (Colombia) Cristian Rodríguez
- Score: 4–6, 7–5, [10–6]

Events
Singles	Doubles
← 2021 ·	Tallahassee Tennis Challenger	· 2023 →

Orlando Luz and Rafael Matos were the defending champions but chose not to defend their title.

Gijs Brouwer and Christian Harrison won the title after defeating Diego Hidalgo and Cristian Rodríguez 4–6, 7–5, [10–6] in the final.

== Seeds ==
1. (Australia) Luke Saville / (Australia) John-Patrick Smith (quarterfinals)
2. (United States) Robert Galloway / (United States) Jackson Withrow (first round)
3. (Ecuador) Diego Hidalgo / (Colombia) Cristian Rodríguez (final)
4. (United States) William Blumberg / (United States) Max Schnur (first round)

== Draw ==
=== Key ===
- Q = Qualifier
- WC = Wild card
- LL = Lucky loser
- Alt = Alternate
- ITF = ITF entry
- PR = Protected ranking
- SR = Special ranking
- SE = Special exempt
- JE = Junior exempt
- JR = Junior Accelerator Programme entrant
- CO = College Accelerator Programme entrant
- NG = Next Gen Accelerator Program entrant
- w/o = Walkover
- r = Retired
- d = Defaulted

First round
1	(Australia) L Saville (Australia) J-P Smith	6	7
(Argentina) TM Etcheverry (Dominican Republic) N Hardt	4	5
(Netherlands) G Brouwer (United States) C Harrison	6	6
WC	(United States) Jack Vance (United States) Jamie Vance	3	0
4	(United States) W Blumberg (United States) M Schnur	4	6	[9]
(India) P Raja (India) R Ramanathan	6	3	[11]
(United States) J Cerretani; E Donskoy	7	6
(Chile) T Barrios Vera (Argentina) A Collarini	5	2
(India) Y Bhambri (India) S Myneni	4	6	[10]
(United States) T Sandgren (Denmark) M Torpegaard	6	3	[6]
(United States) A Lawson (United States) R Stalder	2	3
3	(Ecuador) D Hidalgo (Colombia) C Rodríguez	6	6
(United States) M Krueger (South Africa) R Roelofse	5	3
WC	(France) Antoine Cornut-Chauvinc (Luxembourg) A Knaff	7	6
PR	(Australia) A Harris (Australia) J Kubler	7^{7}	6
2	(United States) R Galloway (United States) J Withrow	6^{0}	3

Quarterfinals
1	(Australia) L Saville (Australia) J-P Smith	3	6^{4}
(Netherlands) G Brouwer (United States) C Harrison	6	7^{7}
(India) P Raja (India) R Ramanathan	7^{7}	6
(United States) J Cerretani; E Donskoy	6^{5}	2
(India) Y Bhambri (India) S Myneni	3	4
3	(Ecuador) D Hidalgo (Colombia) C Rodríguez	6	6
WC	(France) A Cornut-Chauvinc (Luxembourg) A Knaff	6	3	[4]
PR	(Australia) A Harris (Australia) J Kubler	4	6	[10]

Semifinals
(Netherlands) G Brouwer (United States) C Harrison	7^{7}	6
(India) P Raja (India) R Ramanathan	6^{2}	3
3	(Ecuador) D Hidalgo (Colombia) C Rodríguez	7	6
PR	(Australia) A Harris (Australia) J Kubler	5	3

Final
(Netherlands) G Brouwer (United States) C Harrison	4	7	[10]
3	(Ecuador) D Hidalgo (Colombia) C Rodríguez	6	5	[6]
