= 2023 Tallahassee Tennis Challenger – Singles =

Singles
- 2023 Tallahassee Tennis Challenger

Final
- Champion: (Belgium) Zizou Bergs
- Runner-up: (Chinese Taipei) Wu Tung-lin
- Score: 7–5, 6–2

Events
Singles	Doubles
← 2022 ·	Tallahassee Tennis Challenger	· 2024 →

Wu Tung-lin was the defending champion but lost in the final to Zizou Bergs.

Bergs won the title after defeating Wu 7–5, 6–2 in the final.

== Seeds ==
1. (China) Zhang Zhizhen (quarterfinals)
2. (Argentina) Camilo Ugo Carabelli (first round)
3. (Germany) Dominik Koepfer (first round)
4. (Argentina) Facundo Díaz Acosta (second round)
5. (Chinese Taipei) Wu Tung-lin (final)
6. (Belgium) Zizou Bergs (champion)
7. (France) Enzo Couacaud (semifinals)
8. (Japan) Rio Noguchi (second round)

== Draw ==
=== Key ===
- Q = Qualifier
- WC = Wild card
- LL = Lucky loser
- Alt = Alternate
- ITF = ITF entry
- PR = Protected ranking
- SR = Special ranking
- SE = Special exempt
- JE = Junior exempt
- JR = Junior Accelerator Programme entrant
- CO = College Accelerator Programme entrant
- NG = Next Gen Accelerator Program entrant
- w/o = Walkover
- r = Retired
- d = Defaulted

=== Finals ===
Semifinals
6	(Belgium) Zizou Bergs	6	6
(South Korea) Hong Seong-chan	2	1
5	(Chinese Taipei) Wu Tung-lin	4	6	7^{7}
7	(France) Enzo Couacaud	6	1	6^{5}

Final
6	(Belgium) Zizou Bergs	7	6
5	(Chinese Taipei) Wu Tung-lin	5	2

=== Top half ===
First round
1	(China) Zh Zhang	6	6
(Argentina) N Kicker	1	2
Q	(France) K Jacquet	6	6
WC	(United States) B Kuzuhara	2	1
Q	(United States) P Kypson	6	7
(United States) U Blanch	3	5
(Italy) A Arnaboldi	4	3
6	(Belgium) Z Bergs	6	6
4	(Argentina) F Díaz Acosta	6	6
PR	(United States) B Fratangelo	3	4
(Tunisia) M Echargui	6	2	6
Q	(Argentina) FA Gómez	1	6	4
PR	(United States) C Harrison	3	1
(South Korea) S-c Hong	6	6
(France) C Hemery	4	2
8	(Japan) R Noguchi	6	6

Second round
1	(China) Zh Zhang	6	6
Q	(France) K Jacquet	3	1
Q	(United States) P Kypson	2	2
6	(Belgium) Z Bergs	6	6
4	(Argentina) F Díaz Acosta	6^{1}	5
(Tunisia) M Echargui	7^{7}	7
(South Korea) S-c Hong	6	6
8	(Japan) R Noguchi	1	4

Quarterfinals
1	(China) Zh Zhang	3	5
6	(Belgium) Z Bergs	6	7
(Tunisia) M Echargui	4	6	1
(South Korea) S-c Hong	6	2	6

Semifinals
6	(Belgium) Z Bergs	6	6
(South Korea) S-c Hong	2	1

=== Bottom half ===
First round
5	(Chinese Taipei) T-l Wu	6	6
(United States) A Rybakov	4	4
Q	(United States) S Kirchheimer	7^{8}	2	3
(United States) M Krueger	6^{6}	6	6
WC	(United States) Kyle Kang	3	7^{8}	6
Q	(Northern Mariana Islands) C Sinclair	6	6^{6}	4
WC	(United States) T-S Kwiatkowski	3	6	6
3	(Germany) D Koepfer	6	3	4
7	(France) E Couacaud	5	7^{7}	6
Q	(United States) M Damm	7	6^{3}	2
(United States) N Chappell	3	4
Alt	(Kazakhstan) D Popko	6	6
(France) M Martineau	3	2
PR	(France) L Pouille	6	6
(United States) A Michelsen	5	6	6
2	(Argentina) C Ugo Carabelli	7	3	2

Second round
5	(Chinese Taipei) T-l Wu	6	2	6
(United States) M Krueger	2	6	4
WC	(United States) K Kang	4	4
WC	(United States) T-S Kwiatkowski	6	6
7	(France) E Couacaud	6	6
Alt	(Kazakhstan) D Popko	4	1
PR	(France) L Pouille	3	5
(United States) A Michelsen	6	7

Quarterfinals
5	(Chinese Taipei) T-l Wu	4	6	6
WC	(United States) T-S Kwiatkowski	6	4	3
7	(France) E Couacaud	7	7
(United States) A Michelsen	5	5

Semifinals
5	(Chinese Taipei) T-l Wu	4	6	7^{7}
7	(France) E Couacaud	6	1	6^{5}
