= 2021 Tallahassee Tennis Challenger – Singles =

Singles
- 2021 Tallahassee Tennis Challenger

Final
- Champion: (United States) Jenson Brooksby
- Runner-up: (United States) Bjorn Fratangelo
- Score: 6–3, 4–6, 6–3

Events
Singles	Doubles
← 2019 ·	Tallahassee Tennis Challenger	· 2022 →

Emilio Gómez was the defending champion but chose not to defend his title.

Jenson Brooksby won the title after defeating Bjorn Fratangelo 6–3, 4–6, 6–3 in the final.

== Seeds ==
1. (Brazil) Thiago Seyboth Wild (second round)
2. (United States) Denis Kudla (semifinals)
3. (India) Prajnesh Gunneswaran (first round)
4. (Chinese Taipei) Jason Jung (second round)
5. (Croatia) Ivo Karlović (first round)
6. (Argentina) Juan Manuel Cerúndolo (first round)
7. (Kazakhstan) Dmitry Popko (first round)
8. (United States) Michael Mmoh (quarterfinals, retired)

== Draw ==
=== Key ===
- Q = Qualifier
- WC = Wild card
- LL = Lucky loser
- Alt = Alternate
- SE = Special exempt
- PR = Protected ranking
- ITF = ITF entry
- JE = Junior exempt
- w/o = Walkover
- r = Retired
- d = Defaulted
- SR = Special ranking

=== Finals ===
Semifinals
(United States) Jenson Brooksby	6	4	6
(Argentina) Facundo Mena	3	6	4
(United States) Bjorn Fratangelo	7^{7}	6
2	(United States) Denis Kudla	6^{2}	2

Final
(United States) Jenson Brooksby	6	4	6
(United States) Bjorn Fratangelo	3	6	3

=== Top half ===
First round
1	(Brazil) T Seyboth Wild	6	6
(Argentina) TM Etcheverry	3	1
(United States) J Brooksby	6^{11}	6	6
WC	(United States) M Damm	7^{13}	1	2
WC	(United States) R Harrison	2	6	6
LL	(United States) D Young	6	3	3
(Canada) P Polansky	5	6^{5}
8	(United States) M Mmoh	7	7^{7}
3	(India) P Gunneswaran	2	6	4
Alt	(Brazil) P Sakamoto	6	2	6
(Denmark) M Torpegaard	7^{7}	7
Alt	(Brazil) T Bellucci	6^{1}	5
WC	(United States) T Kodat	3	1
(Argentina) F Mena	6	6
(Canada) B Schnur	6	3	6
6	(Argentina) JM Cerúndolo	3	6	4

Second round
1	(Brazil) T Seyboth Wild	6^{6}	4
(United States) J Brooksby	7^{8}	6
WC	(United States) R Harrison	4	3
8	(United States) M Mmoh	6	6
Alt	(Brazil) P Sakamoto	0	6	1
(Denmark) M Torpegaard	6	3	6
(Argentina) F Mena	4	6	6
(Canada) B Schnur	6	3	4

Quarterfinals
(United States) J Brooksby	1	6	4
8	(United States) M Mmoh	6	1	1^{r}
(Denmark) M Torpegaard	1	6^{3}
(Argentina) F Mena	6	7^{7}

Semifinals
(United States) J Brooksby	6	4	6
(Argentina) F Mena	3	6	4

=== Bottom half ===
First round
5	(Croatia) I Karlović	6^{5}	7^{7}	6^{4}
(United States) B Fratangelo	7^{7}	6^{3}	7^{7}
(Japan) Yo Watanuki	6	6
Q	(Argentina) A Velotti	3	4
(United States) T-S Kwiatkowski	3	7^{7}	6
(United States) M Krueger	6	6^{4}	3
(United States) J Sock	6	3	4
4	(Chinese Taipei) J Jung	2	6	6
7	(Kazakhstan) D Popko	7^{7}	3	4
Q	(Romania) F Jianu	6^{5}	6	6
(Dominican Republic) R Cid Subervi	5	4
(Brazil) J Menezes	7	6
Q	(United States) A Ritschard	4	6	6
(Argentina) R Olivo	6	4	3
Q	(United States) A Rybakov	6	5	1
2	(United States) D Kudla	3	7	6

Second round
(United States) B Fratangelo	w/o
(Japan) Yo Watanuki
(United States) T-S Kwiatkowski	6	6
4	(Chinese Taipei) J Jung	3	2
Q	(Romania) F Jianu	6	6
(Brazil) J Menezes	4	4
Q	(United States) A Ritschard	3	6	6^{5}
2	(United States) D Kudla	6	2	7^{7}

Quarterfinals
(United States) B Fratangelo	7	6
(United States) T-S Kwiatkowski	5	4
Q	(Romania) F Jianu	6^{8}	6	5
2	(United States) D Kudla	7^{10}	3	7

Semifinals
(United States) B Fratangelo	7^{7}	6
2	(United States) D Kudla	6^{2}	2
