= 2024 Tallahassee Tennis Challenger – Doubles =

Doubles
- 2024 Tallahassee Tennis Challenger

Final
- Champions: (Sweden) Simon Freund (Denmark) Johannes Ingildsen
- Runners-up: (United States) William Blumberg (Venezuela) Luis David Martínez
- Score: 7–5, 7–6^{(7–4)}

Events
Singles	Doubles
← 2023 ·	Tallahassee Tennis Challenger	· 2025 →

Federico Agustín Gómez and Nicolás Kicker were the defending champions but only Gómez chose to defend his title, partnering Scott Duncan. He lost in the quarterfinals to Alexander Ritschard and Benjamin Sigouin.

Simon Freund and Johannes Ingildsen won the title after defeating William Blumberg and Luis David Martínez 7–5, 7–6^{(7–4)} in the final.

== Seeds ==
1. (United States) William Blumberg / (Venezuela) Luis David Martínez (final)
2. (United States) Christian Harrison / (United Kingdom) Marcus Willis (semifinals)
3. (United Kingdom) Scott Duncan / (Argentina) Federico Agustín Gómez (quarterfinals)
4. (Australia) Thomas Fancutt / (United States) Hunter Reese (first round)

== Draw ==
=== Key ===
- Q = Qualifier
- WC = Wild card
- LL = Lucky loser
- Alt = Alternate
- SE = Special exempt
- PR = Protected ranking
- ITF = ITF entry
- JE = Junior exempt
- w/o = Walkover
- r = Retired
- d = Defaulted
- SR = Special ranking

=== Draw ===
First round
1	(United States) W Blumberg (Venezuela) LD Martínez	6	7^{7}
(United States) T Boyer (United States) Tennyson Whiting	4	6^{4}
(France) C Denolly (France) C Tabur	2	3
WC	(United States) S Kirchheimer (United States) T Kodat	6	6
3	(United Kingdom) S Duncan (Argentina) FA Gómez	7	6
(United States) M Krueger (United States) E Quinn	5	0
(Switzerland) A Ritschard (Canada) B Sigouin	7	2	[10]
(France) A Géa (France) C Hemery	5	6	[4]
(United States) T-S Kwiatkowski (United States) A Lawson	2	0
(Sweden) S Freund (Denmark) J Ingildsen	6	6
(United States) M Damm (United States) A Rybakov	6	6
4	(Australia) T Fancutt (United States) H Reese	3	4
Alt	(United States) Nicholas Bybel (United Kingdom) O Crawford	7	7
WC	(Italy) Elio José Ribeiro Lago (Portugal) D Vale	5	5
(New Zealand) A Rai (Canada) K Stevenson	6	1	[6]
2	(United States) C Harrison (United Kingdom) M Willis	4	6	[10]

Quarterfinals
1	(United States) W Blumberg (Venezuela) LD Martínez	4	6	[10]
WC	(United States) S Kirchheimer (United States) T Kodat	6	3	[8]
3	(United Kingdom) S Duncan (Argentina) FA Gómez	3	4
(Switzerland) A Ritschard (Canada) B Sigouin	6	6
(Sweden) S Freund (Denmark) J Ingildsen	6	7^{7}
(United States) M Damm (United States) A Rybakov	0	6^{2}
Alt	(United States) N Bybel (United Kingdom) O Crawford	3	3
2	(United States) C Harrison (United Kingdom) M Willis	6	6

Semifinals
1	(United States) W Blumberg (Venezuela) LD Martínez	6	6
(Switzerland) A Ritschard (Canada) B Sigouin	4	2
(Sweden) S Freund (Denmark) J Ingildsen	6	6^{3}	[10]
2	(United States) C Harrison (United Kingdom) M Willis	4	7^{7}	[7]

Final
1	(United States) W Blumberg (Venezuela) LD Martínez	5	6^{4}
(Sweden) S Freund (Denmark) J Ingildsen	7	7^{7}
