= 2018 Tallahassee Tennis Challenger =

- Date: 23–28 April
- Edition: 19th
- Draw: 32S / 16D
- Surface: Green clay
- Location: Tallahassee, Florida, United States

Champions

Singles
- (United States) Noah Rubin

Doubles
- (United States) Robert Galloway / (United States) Denis Kudla
← 2017 ·	Tallahassee Tennis Challenger	· 2019 →

The 2018 Tallahassee Tennis Challenger was a professional tennis tournament played on green clay courts. It was the 19th edition of the tournament which was part of the 2018 ATP Challenger Tour. It took place in Tallahassee, Florida, United States between April 23 and April 28, 2018.

== Singles main-draw entrants ==
=== Seeds ===
Country	Player	Rank^{1}	Seed
USA	Denis Kudla	117	1
CAN	Peter Polansky	124	2
SUI	Henri Laaksonen	136	3
USA	Michael Mmoh	151	4
SLO	Blaž Rola	166	5
AUS	Akira Santillan	168	6
USA	Evan King	192	7
SRB	Miomir Kecmanović	197	8

- ^{1} Rankings as of April 16, 2018.

=== Other entrants ===
The following players received wildcards into the singles main draw:

- (United States) JC Aragone
- (Tunisia) Aziz Dougaz
- (United States) Jared Hiltzik
- (United States) Danny Thomas

The following player received entry into the singles main draw as a special exempt:

- (Argentina) Juan Ignacio Londero

The following players received entry from the qualifying draw:

- (United States) Trent Bryde
- (Argentina) Federico Coria
- (Japan) Yoshihito Nishioka
- (Australia) Max Purcell

The following player received entry as a lucky loser:

- (Brazil) João Pedro Sorgi

== Champions ==
=== Singles ===
- (United States) Noah Rubin def. (Australia) Marc Polmans 6–2, 3–6, 6–4.

=== Doubles ===
- (United States) Robert Galloway / (United States) Denis Kudla def. (Spain) Enrique López Pérez / (India) Jeevan Nedunchezhiyan 6–3, 6–1.
