= 2011 Tallahassee Tennis Challenger – Singles =

Singles
- 2011 Tallahassee Tennis Challenger

Final
- Champion: (United States) Donald Young
- Runner-up: (United States) Wayne Odesnik
- Score: 6–4, 3–6, 6–3

Events
| Singles | Doubles |
| ← 2010 · | Tallahassee Tennis Challenger | · 2012 → |

Brian Dabul is the defending champion but lost in the second round.
Donald Young won the title, defeating Wayne Odesnik 6–4, 3–6, 6–3 in the finals.

== Seeds ==
1. (Germany) Rainer Schüttler (quarterfinals)
2. (Japan) Go Soeda (second round)
3. (United States) Michael Russell (first round)
4. (United States) Ryan Sweeting (withdrew)
5. (Argentina) Brian Dabul (second round)
6. (United States) Alex Bogomolov Jr. (first round)
7. (United States) Donald Young (champion)
8. (Australia) Marinko Matosevic (first round)

== Draw ==
=== Key ===
- Q = Qualifier
- WC = Wild card
- LL = Lucky loser
- Alt = Alternate
- SE = Special exempt
- PR = Protected ranking
- ITF = ITF entry
- JE = Junior exempt
- w/o = Walkover
- r = Retired
- d = Defaulted
- SR = Special ranking

=== Finals ===
Semifinals
7 | (United States) Donald Young | 6 | 1 | 6
WC | (United States) James Blake | 1 | 6 | 3
Q | (United States) Wayne Odesnik | 7 | 6
(United States) Bobby Reynolds | 6^{4} | 1

Final
7 | (United States) Donald Young | 6 | 3 | 6
Q | (United States) Wayne Odesnik | 4 | 6 | 3

=== Top half ===
First round
1 | (Germany) R Schüttler | 6 | 6
(Australia) C Ball | 3 | 1
Q | (United States) Greg Ouellette | 7 | 6
(France) Clément Reix | 6^{1} | 1
WC | (United States) D Kudla | 6^{5} | 6 | 6
WC | (United States) M Shabaz | 7 | 4 | 2
(Slovenia) G Žemlja | 6^{3} | 6 | 6^{3}
7 | (United States) D Young | 7 | 4 | 7
LL | (Australia) J Sirianni | 4 | 1
Alt | (United States) M McClune | 6 | 6
LL | (United States) N Monroe | 3 | 7 | 4
(United States) J Witten | 6 | 6^{5} | 1^{r}
WC | (United States) J Blake | 4 | 6 | 6
(Canada) F Dancevic | 6 | 3 | 2
(Bosnia and Herzegovina) A Delić | 6 | 7
6 | (United States) A Bogomolov Jr. | 3 | 5

Second round
1 | (Germany) R Schüttler | 6 | 6^{9} | 6
Q | (United States) Greg Ouellette | 3 | 7 | 2
WC | (United States) D Kudla | 5 | 3
7 | (United States) D Young | 7 | 6
Alt | (United States) M McClune | 6^{4} | 3
LL | (United States) N Monroe | 7 | 6
WC | (United States) J Blake | 6 | 6
(Bosnia and Herzegovina) A Delić | 3 | 4

Quarterfinals
1 | (Germany) R Schüttler | 6 | 4 | 2
7 | (United States) D Young | 2 | 6 | 6
LL | (United States) N Monroe | 3 | 2
WC | (United States) J Blake | 6 | 6

Semifinals
7 | (United States) D Young | 6 | 1 | 6
WC | (United States) J Blake | 1 | 6 | 3

=== Bottom half ===
First round
5 | (Argentina) B Dabul | 6^{4} | 6 | 6
WC | (United States) A Collarini | 7 | 3 | 4
(United States) L Cook | 7 | 3 | 4
Q | (Canada) V Pospisil | 5 | 6 | 6
(United Kingdom) J Ward | 6^{5} | 5
(Canada) P Bester | 7 | 7
Q | (United States) W Odesnik | 6 | 6
3 | (United States) M Russell | 4 | 3
8 | (Australia) M Matosevic | 4 | 4
(Australia) C Guccione | 6 | 6
(Japan) Y Sugita | 7 | 4 | 4
(United States) A Kuznetsov | 5 | 6 | 6
(South Africa) F Wolmarans | 4 | 4
(United States) B Reynolds | 6 | 6
Q | (South Korea) D Yoo | 3 | 4
2 | (Japan) G Soeda | 6 | 6

Second round
5 | (Argentina) B Dabul | 6 | 3 | 4
Q | (Canada) V Pospisil | 2 | 6 | 6
(Canada) P Bester | 2 | 1
Q | (United States) W Odesnik | 6 | 6
(Australia) C Guccione | 3 | 6^{2}
(United States) A Kuznetsov | 6 | 7
(United States) B Reynolds | 6 | 7
2 | (Japan) G Soeda | 3 | 5

Quarterfinals
Q | (Canada) V Pospisil | 6^{0} | 2
Q | (United States) W Odesnik | 7 | 6
(United States) A Kuznetsov | 0 | 0^{r}
(United States) B Reynolds | 6 | 2

Semifinals
Q | (United States) W Odesnik | 7 | 6
(United States) B Reynolds | 6^{4} | 1
