= 2014 Tallahassee Tennis Challenger =

- Date: 28 April – 3 May
- Edition: 15th
- Draw: 32S / 16D
- Prize money: $50,000
- Surface: Green clay
- Location: Tallahassee, Florida, United States

Champions

Singles
- (United States) Robby Ginepri

Doubles
- (Australia) Ryan Agar / (Austria) Sebastian Bader
← 2013 ·	Tallahassee Tennis Challenger	· 2015 →

The 2014 Tallahassee Tennis Challenger was a professional tennis tournament played on hard courts. It was the 15th edition of the tournament which was part of the 2014 ATP Challenger Tour. It took place in Tallahassee, Florida, United States between April 28 and May 3, 2014.

== Singles main-draw entrants ==
=== Seeds ===
Country	Player	Rank	Seed
USA	Donald Young	74	1
USA	Tim Smyczek	106	2
CAN	Peter Polansky	137	3
CAN	Frank Dancevic	139	4
USA	Alex Kuznetsov	145	5
AUT	Gerald Melzer	148	6
GRB	James Ward	153	7
AUS	Nick Kyrgios	171	8

=== Other entrants ===
The following players received wildcards into the singles main draw:

- (Spain) Cristian Gonzalez Mendez
- (United States) Collin Altamirano
- (United States) Dennis Nevolo
- (United States) Jean-Yves Aubone

The following players received entry from the qualifying draw:

- (Australia) Ryan Agar
- (United States) Evan King
- (United States) Bjorn Fratangelo
- (United States) Mitchell Krueger

== Doubles main-draw entrants ==
=== Seeds ===
Country	Player	Country	Player	Rank	Seed
USA	Tim Smyczek	USA	Rhyne Williams	391	1
GRB	David Rice	GRB	Sean Thornley	433	2
CRO	Franko Škugor	CRO	Antonio Veić	459	3
USA	Sekou Bangoura	USA	Evan King	473	4

=== Other entrants ===
The following pairs received wildcards into the doubles main draw:

- (Zimbabwe) Benjamin Lock / (Mexico) Marco Aurelio Nunez
- (United States) Collin Altamirano / (United States) Alex Rybakov
- (United States) Bjorn Fratangelo / (United States) Mitchell Krueger

The following pair received entry from the qualifying draw:

- (Austria) Philip Lang / (Austria) Gerald Melzer

== Champions ==
=== Singles ===
- (United States) Robby Ginepri def. (Canada) Frank Dancevic, 6–3, 6–4

=== Doubles ===
- (Australia) Ryan Agar / (Austria) Sebastian Bader def. (United States) Bjorn Fratangelo / (United States) Mitchell Krueger, 6–4, 7–6^{(7–3)}
