= 2012 Tallahassee Tennis Challenger – Doubles =

Doubles tennis event

Doubles
- 2012 Tallahassee Tennis Challenger

Final
- Champions: (Germany) Martin Emmrich (Sweden) Andreas Siljeström
- Runners-up: (New Zealand) Artem Sitak (United States) Blake Strode
- Score: 6–2, 7–6^{(7–4)}

Events
| Singles | Doubles |
| ← 2011 · | Tallahassee Tennis Challenger | · 2013 → |

Vasek Pospisil and Bobby Reynolds were the defending champions but decided not to participate together.
Reynolds played alongside Carsten Ball, while Pospisil played with Pierre-Ludovic Duclos.
Martin Emmrich and Andreas Siljeström won the title, defeating Artem Sitak and Blake Strode 6–2, 7–6^{(7–4)} in the final.

== Seeds ==
1. (Germany) Martin Emmrich / (Sweden) Andreas Siljeström (champions)
2. (United States) Travis Parrott / (United States) Rajeev Ram (first round)
3. (Australia) Carsten Ball / (United States) Bobby Reynolds (quarterfinals)
4. (France) Pierre-Hugues Herbert / (France) Albano Olivetti (quarterfinals)

== Draw ==
=== Key ===
- Q = Qualifier
- WC = Wild card
- LL = Lucky loser
- Alt = Alternate
- SE = Special exempt
- PR = Protected ranking
- ITF = ITF entry
- JE = Junior exempt
- w/o = Walkover
- r = Retired
- d = Defaulted
- SR = Special ranking

=== Draw ===
First round
1 | (Germany) M Emmrich (Sweden) A Siljeström | 2 | 6 | [16]
(Japan) T Ito (Japan) Y Sugita | 6 | 0 | [14]
(Australia) J Peers (Australia) J-P Smith | 6 | 6
LL | (United States) Adham El-Effendi (United Kingdom) D Walsh | 3 | 4
3 | (Australia) C Ball (United States) B Reynolds | 6 | 6^{4} | [10]
(United Kingdom) C Eaton (United Kingdom) D Inglot | 1 | 7^{7} | [8]
(Canada) P-L Duclos (Canada) V Pospisil
WC | (United States) B Baker (United States) T Sandgren | w/o
(United States) A Kuznetsov (Germany) M Zverev | 1 | 4
Q | (New Zealand) A Sitak (United States) B Strode | 6 | 6
WC | (United States) D Lajola (United States) V Mirzadeh | 6^{6} | 4
4 | (France) P-H Herbert (France) A Olivetti | 7^{8} | 6
WC | (United States) Dominic Cotrone (United States) A Reed | 3 | 4
(United Kingdom) D Rice (United Kingdom) S Thornley | 6 | 6
(Germany) B Becker (Germany) M Kohlmann | 6 | 6
2 | (United States) T Parrott (United States) R Ram | 4 | 3

Quarterfinals
1 | (Germany) M Emmrich (Sweden) A Siljeström | 7^{7} | 3 | [10]
(Australia) J Peers (Australia) J-P Smith | 6^{4} | 6 | [8]
3 | (Australia) C Ball (United States) B Reynolds | 4 | 7 | [5]
WC | (United States) B Baker (United States) T Sandgren | 6 | 5 | [10]
Q | (New Zealand) A Sitak (United States) B Strode | 7^{9} | 4 | [10]
4 | (France) P-H Herbert (France) A Olivetti | 6^{7} | 6 | [7]
(United Kingdom) D Rice (United Kingdom) S Thornley | 4 | 6^{5}
(Germany) B Becker (Germany) M Kohlmann | 6 | 7^{7}

Semifinals
1 | (Germany) M Emmrich (Sweden) A Siljeström | 6 | 6
WC | (United States) B Baker (United States) T Sandgren | 4 | 1
Q | (New Zealand) A Sitak (United States) B Strode | 6 | 3 | [10]
(Germany) B Becker (Germany) M Kohlmann | 4 | 6 | [8]

Final
1 | (Germany) M Emmrich (Sweden) A Siljeström | 6 | 7^{7}
Q | (New Zealand) A Sitak (United States) B Strode | 2 | 6^{4}
