= 2014 Tallahassee Tennis Challenger – Singles =

Singles
- 2014 Tallahassee Tennis Challenger

Final
- Champion: (United States) Robby Ginepri
- Runner-up: (Canada) Frank Dancevic
- Score: 6–3, 6–4

Events
Singles	Doubles
← 2013 ·	Tallahassee Tennis Challenger	· 2015 →

Denis Kudla was the defending champion, but did not participate.

Robby Ginepri won the title, defeating Frank Dancevic 6–3, 6–4 in the final.

== Seeds ==
1. (United States) Donald Young (semifinals)
2. (United States) Tim Smyczek (first round)
3. (Canada) Peter Polansky (quarterfinals)
4. (Canada) Frank Dancevic (final)
5. (United States) Alex Kuznetsov (quarterfinals)
6. (Austria) Gerald Melzer (quarterfinals)
7. (United Kingdom) James Ward (quarterfinals)
8. (Australia) Nick Kyrgios (withdrew)

== Draw ==
=== Key ===
- Q = Qualifier
- WC = Wild card
- LL = Lucky loser
- Alt = Alternate
- SE = Special exempt
- PR = Protected ranking
- ITF = ITF entry
- JE = Junior exempt
- w/o = Walkover
- r = Retired
- d = Defaulted
- SR = Special ranking

=== Finals ===
Semifinals
1	(United States) Donald Young	4	4
4	(Canada) Frank Dancevic	6	6
(United States) Robby Ginepri	6	6
(Republic of Ireland) James McGee	1	4

Final
4	(Canada) Frank Dancevic	3	4
(United States) Robby Ginepri	6	6

=== Top half ===
First round
1	(United States) D Young	7^{7}	6
(Australia) T Kokkinakis	6^{4}	1
Q	(Australia) R Agar	4	3
Q	(United States) E King	6	6
WC	(Spain) Cristian Gonzalez Mendez	6^{4}	3
(Barbados) D King	7^{7}	6
LL	(United States) E Quigley	6^{0}	2
5	(United States) A Kuznetsov	7^{7}	6
4	(Canada) F Dancevic	6	6
WC	(United States) C Altamirano	2	2
(Croatia) A Veić	7^{7}	6
(United Kingdom) D Rice	6^{3}	1
(United States) B Reynolds	6	6
(United States) N Meister	2	2
(India) S Singh	0	2
6	(Austria) G Melzer	6	6

Second round
1	(United States) D Young	6	6
Q	(United States) E King	3	4
(Barbados) D King	0	2
5	(United States) A Kuznetsov	6	6
4	(Canada) F Dancevic	6	6
(Croatia) A Veić	1	1
(United States) B Reynolds	3	6^{5}
6	(Austria) G Melzer	6	7^{7}

Quarterfinals
1	(United States) D Young	7^{12}	4	6
5	(United States) A Kuznetsov	6^{10}	6	4
4	(Canada) F Dancevic	7^{9}	6
6	(Austria) G Melzer	6^{7}	2

Semifinals
1	(United States) D Young	4	4
4	(Canada) F Dancevic	6	6

=== Bottom half ===
First round
7	(United Kingdom) J Ward	6	6
WC	(United States) Dennis Nevolo	1	1
(United States) D Kosakowski	7	4	0
(Australia) J Kubler	5	6	6
(United States) R Ginepri	6	6
WC	(United States) Jean-Yves Aubone	1	1
(Ukraine) I Marchenko	2	6	5
3	(Canada) P Polansky	6	4	7
Q	(United States) B Fratangelo	2	4
(Republic of Ireland) J McGee	6	6
(Serbia) I Bozoljac	6	6^{6}	0^{r}
Q	(United States) M Krueger	2	7^{8}	2
(Zimbabwe) T Garanganga	5	3
(United States) R Williams	7	6
(Japan) Y Nishioka	6	6
2	(United States) T Smyczek	2	2

Second round
7	(United Kingdom) J Ward	2
(Australia) J Kubler	0^{r}
(United States) R Ginepri	6	6
3	(Canada) P Polansky	1	0
(Republic of Ireland) J McGee	6	6
Q	(United States) M Krueger	2	2
(United States) R Williams	6^{6}	4
(Japan) Y Nishioka	7^{8}	6

Quarterfinals
7	(United Kingdom) J Ward	3	6	2
(United States) R Ginepri	6	3	6
(Republic of Ireland) J McGee	7^{7}	7
(Japan) Y Nishioka	6^{5}	5

Semifinals
(United States) R Ginepri	6	6
(Republic of Ireland) J McGee	1	4
