= 2012 Tallahassee Tennis Challenger – Singles =

Singles
- 2012 Tallahassee Tennis Challenger

Final
- Champion: (United States) Tim Smyczek
- Runner-up: (Canada) Frank Dancevic
- Score: 7–5, retired

Events
Singles	Doubles
← 2011 ·	Tallahassee Tennis Challenger	· 2013 →

Donald Young was the defending champion but decided not to participate.
Tim Smyczek won the title, when Frank Dancevic retired in the final after losing the first set 5–7.

== Seeds ==
1. (Chinese Taipei) Yen-Hsun Lu (withdrew due to a neck injury)
2. (United States) Ryan Sweeting (quarterfinals)
3. (Russia) Igor Kunitsyn (quarterfinals)
4. (Japan) Tatsuma Ito (semifinals)
5. (Canada) Vasek Pospisil (first round)
6. (United States) Wayne Odesnik (quarterfinals)
7. (Brazil) Rogério Dutra da Silva (second round)
8. (United States) Bobby Reynolds (quarterfinals)
9. (Canada) Frank Dancevic (final, retired)

== Draw ==
=== Key ===
- Q = Qualifier
- WC = Wild card
- LL = Lucky loser
- Alt = Alternate
- SE = Special exempt
- PR = Protected ranking
- ITF = ITF entry
- JE = Junior exempt
- w/o = Walkover
- r = Retired
- d = Defaulted
- SR = Special ranking

=== Finals ===
Semifinals
9/Alt	(Canada) Frank Dancevic	6	3	6
4	(Japan) Tatsuma Ito	1	6	1
(United States) Tim Smyczek	6	3	6
(United States) Rajeev Ram	4	6	3

Final
9/Alt	(Canada) Frank Dancevic	5^{r}
(United States) Tim Smyczek	7

=== Top half ===
First round
9/Alt	(Canada) F Dancevic	6	6
Q	(New Zealand) A Sitak	0	4
WC	(United States) T Sandgren	6	0	4
(United Kingdom) J Baker	0	6	6
(Germany) Stefan Seifert	3	7	6^{6}
LL	(United States) D Kosakowski	6	5	7^{8}
(United States) M Yani	4	1^{r}
8	(United States) B Reynolds	6	2
4	(Japan) T Ito	6	1	7
Q	(Australia) J Peers	4	6	5
Q	(United States) B Strode	2	1
WC	(United States) B Baker	6	6
(Japan) Y Sugita	5	6	6
(Canada) P-L Duclos	7	1	2
(Germany) B Becker	4	0
6	(United States) W Odesnik	6	6

Second round
9/Alt	(Canada) F Dancevic	7	7
(United Kingdom) J Baker	5	5
LL	(United States) D Kosakowski	6	3	2
8	(United States) B Reynolds	3	6	6
4	(Japan) T Ito	6	6
WC	(United States) B Baker	4	4
(Japan) Y Sugita	4	5
6	(United States) W Odesnik	6	7

Quarterfinals
9/Alt	(Canada) F Dancevic	6	7^{7}
8	(United States) B Reynolds	0	6^{3}
4	(Japan) T Ito	7	6
6	(United States) W Odesnik	5	2

Semifinals
9/Alt	(Canada) F Dancevic	6	3	6
4	(Japan) T Ito	1	6	1

=== Bottom half ===
First round
7	(Brazil) R Dutra da Silva	7	6
Q	(Germany) M Emmrich	5	2
(United States) T Smyczek	6	7^{7}
(United States) A Kuznetsov	3	6^{4}
(United States) J Levine	6^{0}	6	2
LL	(Romania) C Gârd	7^{7}	4	6
(Germany) M Zverev	2	1^{r}
3	(Russia) I Kunitsyn	6	1
5	(Canada) V Pospisil	3	6	3
(Australia) C Ball	6	3	6
(United States) R Ram	6	5	6
(France) P-H Herbert	4	7	4
WC	(United States) V Mirzadeh	3	7	6
(France) A Olivetti	6	5	2
(United States) M Russell	4	6	3
2/WC	(United States) R Sweeting	6	3	6

Second round
7	(Brazil) R Dutra da Silva	6	3	3
(United States) T Smyczek	2	6	6
LL	(Romania) C Gârd	4	7	4
3	(Russia) I Kunitsyn	6	5	6
(Australia) C Ball	4	6	1
(United States) R Ram	6	3	6
WC	(United States) V Mirzadeh	4	3
2/WC	(United States) R Sweeting	6	6

Quarterfinals
(United States) T Smyczek	6^{6}	6	6
3	(Russia) I Kunitsyn	7^{8}	3	2
(United States) R Ram	6^{3}	6	6
2/WC	(United States) R Sweeting	7^{7}	1	4

Semifinals
(United States) T Smyczek	6	3	6
(United States) R Ram	4	6	3
