= 2016 Tallahassee Tennis Challenger – Singles =

Singles
- 2016 Tallahassee Tennis Challenger

Final
- Champion: (France) Quentin Halys
- Runner-up: (United States) Frances Tiafoe
- Score: 6–7^{(6–8)}, 6–4, 6–2

Events
Singles	Doubles
- Tallahassee Tennis Challenger

Facundo Argüello was the defending champion but lost in the first round to Frances Tiafoe.

Quentin Halys won the title, defeating Frances Tiafoe 6–7^{(6–8)}, 6–4, 6–2 in the final.

== Seeds ==
1. (United States) Donald Young (quarterfinals)
2. (Austria) Gerald Melzer (second round)
3. (United States) Tim Smyczek (first round)
4. (United States) Bjorn Fratangelo (first round)
5. (Georgia (country)) Nikoloz Basilashvili (second round)
6. (Argentina) Facundo Argüello (first round)
7. (United States) Jared Donaldson (first round)
8. (United States) Dennis Novikov (first round)

== Draw ==
Key

- Q = Qualifier
- WC = Wild card
- LL = Lucky loser
- Alt = Alternate
- ITF = ITF entry
- PR = Protected ranking
- SR = Special ranking
- SE = Special exempt
- JE = Junior exempt
- JR = Junior Accelerator Programme entrant
- CO = College Accelerator Programme entrant
- NG = Next Gen Accelerator Program entrant
- w/o = Walkover
- r = Retired
- d = Defaulted

=== Finals ===
Semifinals
(United States) Frances Tiafoe	7^{7}	6
(United States) Ryan Harrison	6^{4}	4
(France) Quentin Halys	6	6
Q	(Republic of Ireland) James McGee	4	1

Final
(United States) Frances Tiafoe	7^{8}	4	2
(France) Quentin Halys	6^{6}	6	6

=== Top half ===
First round
1	(United States) D Young	6	6
SE	(United States) E Escobedo	3	4
(Russia) D Medvedev	6	7
WC	(Zimbabwe) B Lock	2	5
(Colombia) A Falla	6	2	2
(United States) M Krueger	4	6	6
(United States) F Tiafoe	6	6
6	(Argentina) F Argüello	3	3
3	(United States) T Smyczek	4	5
WC	(United States) B Baker	6	7
WC	(United States) E Quigley	4	7	3
(United States) N Rubin	6	5	6
(Switzerland) H Laaksonen	3	6^{2}
(United States) R Harrison	6	7^{7}
(Ecuador) G Lapentti	7^{7}	6
8	(United States) D Novikov	6^{5}	3

Second round
1	(United States) D Young	6	7^{7}
(Russia) D Medvedev	4	6^{5}
(United States) M Krueger	4	6	1
(United States) F Tiafoe	6	3	6
WC	(United States) B Baker	5	7^{7}	2
(United States) N Rubin	7	6^{4}	6
(United States) R Harrison	6	6
(Ecuador) G Lapentti	3	4

Quarterfinals
1	(United States) D Young	6	4	3
(United States) F Tiafoe	2	6	6
(United States) N Rubin	6	0	3
(United States) R Harrison	2	6	6

Semifinals
(United States) F Tiafoe	7^{7}	6
(United States) R Harrison	6^{4}	4

=== Bottom half ===
First round
7	(United States) J Donaldson	4	3
(France) C Hemery	6	6
(United Kingdom) J Ward	7^{7}	6
(France) A Michon	6^{5}	4
Q	(United States) S Bangoura	6	6
WC	(United States) T Sandgren	2	4
(France) Q Halys	7^{7}	6
4	(United States) B Fratangelo	6^{1}	2
5	(Georgia (country)) N Basilashvili	6	7
Q	(Ecuador) E Gómez	4	5
SE	(Chile) N Jarry	7	5	3
Q	(Republic of Ireland) J McGee	5	7	6
(Dominican Republic) J Hernández	7^{7}	6^{4}	4
Q	(United States) S Kozlov	6^{4}	7^{7}	6
(Argentina) N Kicker	5	2
2	(Austria) G Melzer	7	6

Second round
(France) C Hemery	4	0
(United Kingdom) J Ward	6	6
Q	(United States) S Bangoura	3	2
(France) Q Halys	6	6
5	(Georgia (country)) N Basilashvili	3	0
Q	(Republic of Ireland) J McGee	6	6
Q	(United States) S Kozlov	6	3	6
2	(Austria) G Melzer	2	6	2

Quarterfinals
(United Kingdom) J Ward	6	4	4
(France) Q Halys	1	6	6
Q	(Republic of Ireland) J McGee	6	2	7^{7}
Q	(United States) S Kozlov	3	6	6^{1}

Semifinals
(France) Q Halys	6	6
Q	(Republic of Ireland) J McGee	4	1
