= 2010 Tallahassee Tennis Challenger – Doubles =

Doubles
- 2010 Tallahassee Tennis Challenger

Final
- Champions: (Australia) Stephen Huss (Australia) Joseph Sirianni
- Runners-up: (United States) Robert Kendrick (United States) Bobby Reynolds
- Score: 6–2, 6–4

Events
Singles	Doubles
← 2009 ·	Tallahassee Tennis Challenger	· 2011 →

Eric Butorac and Scott Lipsky were the defending champions, but Butorac chose to participate in Barcelona instead.
Lipsky partnered up with David Martin, but they lost in the first round against Robert Kendrick and Bobby Reynolds.
Stephen Huss and Joseph Sirianni won in the final 6–2, 6–4 against Robert Kendrick and Bobby Reynolds

== Seeds ==
1. (United States) Rajeev Ram / (United States) Travis Rettenmaier (semifinals)
2. (United States) Scott Lipsky / (United States) David Martin (first round)
3. (Australia) Carsten Ball / (Australia) Chris Guccione (first round)
4. (Philippines) Treat Conrad Huey / (India) Harsh Mankad (first round)

== Draw ==
=== Key ===
- Q = Qualifier
- WC = Wild card
- LL = Lucky loser
- Alt = Alternate
- SE = Special exempt
- PR = Protected ranking
- ITF = ITF entry
- JE = Junior exempt
- w/o = Walkover
- r = Retired
- d = Defaulted
- SR = Special ranking

=== Draw ===
First round
1	(United States) R Ram (United States) T Rettenmaier	6	6
WC	(United States) V Mirzadeh (United States) C Smith	3	3
(Germany) M Emmrich (Sweden) A Siljeström	6	6
Q	(Chinese Taipei) T Chen (Germany) S Rieschick	2	3
3	(Australia) C Ball (Australia) C Guccione	6^{5}	6^{6}
(Australia) S Huss (Australia) J Siriani	7	7
(Canada) P Polansky (United States) D Young	6^{4}	1
(Chile) P Capdeville (Argentina) B Dabul	7	6
WC	(United States) B Evans (United States) T Smyczek	4	0
(Australia) K Hensel (Australia) A Hubble	6	6
(United States) A Kuznetsov (United States) R Sweeting	6	6
4	(Philippines) TC Huey (India) H Mankad	4	3
(Mexico) S González (Canada) V Pospisil	3	3
WC	(United States) R Battistone (United States) R DeHeart	6	6
(United States) R Kendrick (United States) B Reynolds	6	6
2	(United States) S Lipsky (United States) D Martin	2	4

Quarterfinals
1	(United States) R Ram (United States) T Rettenmaier	6	2	[10]
(Germany) M Emmrich (Sweden) A Siljeström	1	6	[7]
(Australia) S Huss (Australia) J Siriani
(Chile) P Capdeville (Argentina) B Dabul	w/o
(Australia) K Hensel (Australia) A Hubble	6	6
(United States) A Kuznetsov (United States) R Sweeting	3	1
WC	(United States) R Battistone (United States) R DeHeart	6	4	[7]
(United States) R Kendrick (United States) B Reynolds	3	6	[10]

Semifinals
1	(United States) R Ram (United States) T Rettenmaier	4	4
(Australia) S Huss (Australia) J Siriani	6	6
(Australia) K Hensel (Australia) A Hubble	6	3	[5]
(United States) R Kendrick (United States) B Reynolds	2	6	[10]

Finals
(Australia) S Huss (Australia) J Siriani	6	6
(United States) R Kendrick (United States) B Reynolds	2	4
