= 2022 Tallahassee Tennis Challenger – Singles =

Singles
- 2022 Tallahassee Tennis Challenger

Final
- Champion: (Chinese Taipei) Wu Tung-lin
- Runner-up: (United States) Michael Mmoh
- Score: 6–3, 6–4

Events
Singles	Doubles
← 2021 ·	Tallahassee Tennis Challenger	· 2023 →

Jenson Brooksby was the defending champion but chose not to defend his title.

Wu Tung-lin won the title after defeating Michael Mmoh 6–3, 6–4 in the final.

== Seeds ==
1. (Argentina) Tomás Martín Etcheverry (second round)
2. (United States) Steve Johnson (first round)
3. (Colombia) Daniel Elahi Galán (semifinals)
4. (Ecuador) Emilio Gómez (second round)
5. (Chile) Tomás Barrios Vera (second round)
6. (United States) J. J. Wolf (quarterfinals)
7. (United States) Mitchell Krueger (second round, retired)
8. (United States) Tennys Sandgren (first round)

== Draw ==
=== Key ===
- Q = Qualifier
- WC = Wild card
- LL = Lucky loser
- Alt = Alternate
- SE = Special exempt
- PR = Protected ranking
- ITF = ITF entry
- JE = Junior exempt
- w/o = Walkover
- r = Retired
- d = Defaulted
- SR = Special ranking

=== Finals ===
Semifinals
(United States) Michael Mmoh	3	7	6
3	(Colombia) Daniel Elahi Galán	6	5	4
(Chinese Taipei) Wu Tung-lin	6	7^{9}
(China) Zhang Zhizhen	4	6^{7}

Final
(United States) Michael Mmoh	3	4
(Chinese Taipei) Wu Tung-lin	6	6

=== Top half ===
First round
1	(Argentina) TM Etcheverry	6	6
(Chinese Taipei) J Jung	3	2
(United States) M Mmoh	6	6
(India) S Nagal	3	0
Q	(United States) Christian Langmo	2	6^{1}
WC	(United States) A Kovacevic	6	7^{7}
(India) R Ramanathan	1	3
5	(Chile) T Barrios Vera	6	6
3	(Colombia) DE Galán	6	6
(Argentina) A Collarini	4	3
WC	(United States) A Rybakov	6^{3}	3
(Australia) J Kubler	7^{7}	6
Q	(Netherlands) G Brouwer	1	6	6^{1}
(Japan) Yo Watanuki	6	1	7^{7}
(Chile) G Lama	7	6^{3}	7^{8}
8	(United States) T Sandgren	5	7^{7}	6^{6}

Second round
1	(Argentina) TM Etcheverry	6	3	3
(United States) M Mmoh	4	6	6
WC	(United States) A Kovacevic	7^{7}	6
5	(Chile) T Barrios Vera	6^{4}	4
3	(Colombia) DE Galán	6	7^{7}
(Australia) J Kubler	1	6^{5}
(Japan) Yo Watanuki	7^{7}	6
(Chile) G Lama	6^{2}	0

Quarterfinals
(United States) M Mmoh	6	7^{7}
WC	(United States) A Kovacevic	2	6^{4}
3	(Colombia) DE Galán	6	6
(Japan) Yo Watanuki	3	4

Semifinals
(United States) M Mmoh	3	7	6
3	(Colombia) DE Galán	6	5	4

=== Bottom half ===
First round
7	(United States) M Krueger	7	6
(United States) N Moreno de Alboran	5	4
(United States) C Harrison	6	6
(India) P Gunneswaran	3	3
(Chinese Taipei) T-l Wu	6	6
WC	(France) Antoine Cornut-Chauvinc	3	2
Q	(Denmark) M Torpegaard	6	5	4
4	(Ecuador) E Gómez	3	7	6
6	(United States) J. J. Wolf	7^{7}	5	6
Q	(Brazil) D Dutra da Silva	6^{5}	7	2
(Switzerland) A Ritschard	6	6
Q	(Sweden) J Mridha	2	4
E Donskoy	6	6
Q	(France) A Fils	0	4
(China) Zh Zhang	2	6	7
2	(United States) S Johnson	6	3	5

Second round
7	(United States) M Krueger	4	0^{r}
(United States) C Harrison	6	0
(Chinese Taipei) T-l Wu	6	6^{1}	6
4	(Ecuador) E Gómez	0	7^{7}	1
6	(United States) J. J. Wolf	7^{7}	6
(Switzerland) A Ritschard	6^{5}	3
E Donskoy	6^{1}	5
(China) Zh Zhang	7^{7}	7

Quarterfinals
(United States) C Harrison	0	4
(Chinese Taipei) T-l Wu	6	6
6	(United States) J. J. Wolf	3	6	6^{2}
(China) Zh Zhang	6	3	7^{7}

Semifinals
(Chinese Taipei) T-l Wu	6	7^{9}
(China) Zh Zhang	4	6^{7}
