= 2011 Tallahassee Tennis Challenger – Doubles =

Doubles
- 2011 Tallahassee Tennis Challenger

Final
- Champion: (Canada) Vasek Pospisil (United States) Bobby Reynolds
- Runner-up: (Japan) Go Soeda (United Kingdom) James Ward
- Score: 6–2, 6–4

Events
Singles	Doubles
← 2010 ·	Tallahassee Tennis Challenger	· 2012 →

Stephen Huss and Joseph Sirianni were the defending champions, but chose not to compete with each other. Huss partnered up with Ashley Fisher, while Sirianni played alongside Fritz Wolmarans. The event was won by Vasek Pospisil and Bobby Reynolds, defeating Go Soeda and James Ward 6–2, 6–4 in the final.

== Seeds ==
1. (Australia) Carsten Ball / (Australia) Chris Guccione (first round)
2. (Australia) Ashley Fisher / (Australia) Stephen Huss (semifinals)
3. (Canada) Vasek Pospisil / (United States) Bobby Reynolds (champions)
4. (United States) Nicholas Monroe / (United States) Donald Young (semifinals)

== Draw ==
Key

- Q = Qualifier
- WC = Wild card
- LL = Lucky loser
- Alt = Alternate
- ITF = ITF entry
- PR = Protected ranking
- SR = Special ranking
- SE = Special exempt
- JE = Junior exempt
- JR = Junior Accelerator Programme entrant
- CO = College Accelerator Programme entrant
- NG = Next Gen Accelerator Program entrant
- w/o = Walkover
- r = Retired
- d = Defaulted

=== Draw ===
First round
1	(Australia) C Ball (Australia) C Guccione	6^{3}	4
(Canada) P Bester (Canada) F Dancevic	7	6
(Japan) G Soeda (United Kingdom) J Ward	6	6
WC	(United States) Vahid Mirzadeh (United States) Connor Smith	2	2
4	(United States) N Monroe (United States) D Young	6	3	[10]
Q	(Mexico) L Díaz-Barriga (Mexico) D Garza	2	6	[3]
(Australia) J Sirianni (South Africa) F Wolmarans	4	4
(Bosnia and Herzegovina) A Delić (Canada) P-L Duclos	6	6
WC	(United States) M Sykut (United States) D Zivkovic	w/o
(United States) A Bogomolov Jr. (United States) A Kuznetsov
(Japan) Y Sugita (United States) J Witten	0	1
3	(Canada) V Pospisil (United States) B Reynolds	6	6
WC	(United States) L Cook (United States) Brett Joelson	6	6
(Australia) M Matosevic (Slovenia) G Žemlja	4	2
(Argentina) B Dabul (United States) JP Fruttero	7	3	[4]
2	(Australia) A Fisher (Australia) S Huss	6^{6}	6	[10]

Quarterfinals
(Canada) P Bester (Canada) F Dancevic	6^{2}	0
(Japan) G Soeda (United Kingdom) J Ward	7	6
4	(United States) N Monroe (United States) D Young	6	4	[10]
(Bosnia and Herzegovina) A Delić (Canada) P-L Duclos	1	6	[5]
WC	(United States) M Sykut (United States) D Zivkovic	5	3
3	(Canada) V Pospisil (United States) B Reynolds	7	6
WC	(United States) L Cook (United States) Brett Joelson	5	3
2	(Australia) A Fisher (Australia) S Huss	7	6

Semifinals
(Japan) G Soeda (United Kingdom) J Ward	6	2	[10]
4	(United States) N Monroe (United States) D Young	3	6	[8]
3	(Canada) V Pospisil (United States) B Reynolds	6	6^{1}	[10]
2	(Australia) A Fisher (Australia) S Huss	4	7	[4]

Finals
(Japan) G Soeda (United Kingdom) J Ward	2	4
3	(Canada) V Pospisil (United States) B Reynolds	6	6
