= 2019 Tallahassee Tennis Challenger – Doubles =

Doubles
- 2019 Tallahassee Tennis Challenger

Final
- Champions: (Venezuela) Roberto Maytín (Brazil) Fernando Romboli
- Runners-up: (United States) Thai-Son Kwiatkowski (United States) Noah Rubin
- Score: 6–2, 4–6, [10–7]

Events
Singles	Doubles
- Tallahassee Tennis Challenger

Robert Galloway and Denis Kudla were the defending champions but chose not to defend their title.

Roberto Maytín and Fernando Romboli won the title after defeating Thai-Son Kwiatkowski and Noah Rubin 6–2, 4–6, [10–7] in the final.

== Seeds ==
1. (India) Jeevan Nedunchezhiyan / (India) Purav Raja (first round)
2. (United States) Nathaniel Lammons / (United States) Jackson Withrow (first round)
3. (United States) Nicholas Monroe / (South Africa) Ruan Roelofse (first round)
4. (Venezuela) Roberto Maytín / (Brazil) Fernando Romboli (champions)

== Draw ==
Key

- Q = Qualifier
- WC = Wild card
- LL = Lucky loser
- Alt = Alternate
- ITF = ITF entry
- PR = Protected ranking
- SR = Special ranking
- SE = Special exempt
- JE = Junior exempt
- JR = Junior Accelerator Programme entrant
- CO = College Accelerator Programme entrant
- NG = Next Gen Accelerator Program entrant
- w/o = Walkover
- r = Retired
- d = Defaulted

First round
1	(India) J Nedunchezhiyan (India) P Raja	6^{6}	4
(Brazil) G Clezar (Australia) M Polmans	7^{8}	6
WC	(Luxembourg) A Knaff (France) L Poullain	4	5
PR	(Canada) F Dancevic (Canada) P Polansky	6	7
4	(Venezuela) R Maytín (Brazil) F Romboli	4	6	[10]
(United States) D Novikov (Sweden) A Siljeström	6	3	[8]
ITF	(Switzerland) S Ehrat (Russia) A Zhurbin	2	3
WC	(United States) JC Aragone (Philippines) T Huey	6	6
(United States) T-S Kwiatkowski (United States) N Rubin	7^{7}	6
ITF	(France) A Rinderknech (Kazakhstan) D Yevseyev	6^{5}	4
(Uruguay) M Cuevas (Ecuador) E Gómez	7	6
3	(United States) N Monroe (South Africa) R Roelofse	5	3
WC	(United States) R Shane (United States) Evan Song	1	3
(Sweden) A Göransson (United States) H Reese	6	6
(Finland) H Heliövaara (United States) A Lawson	7^{7}	3	[10]
2	(United States) N Lammons (United States) J Withrow	6^{3}	6	[7]

Quarterfinals
(Brazil) G Clezar (Australia) M Polmans	6	6
PR	(Canada) F Dancevic (Canada) P Polansky	4	3
4	(Venezuela) R Maytín (Brazil) F Romboli	3	7^{7}	[10]
WC	(United States) JC Aragone (Philippines) T Huey	6	6^{1}	[7]
(United States) T-S Kwiatkowski (United States) N Rubin	6	6
(Uruguay) M Cuevas (Ecuador) E Gómez	3	3
(Sweden) A Göransson (United States) H Reese	6^{3}	4
(Finland) H Heliövaara (United States) A Lawson	7^{7}	6

Semifinals
(Brazil) G Clezar (Australia) M Polmans	4	2
4	(Venezuela) R Maytín (Brazil) F Romboli	6	6
(United States) T-S Kwiatkowski (United States) N Rubin	6	4	[12]
(Finland) H Heliövaara (United States) A Lawson	3	6	[10]

Final
4	(Venezuela) R Maytín (Brazil) F Romboli	6	4	[10]
(United States) T-S Kwiatkowski (United States) N Rubin	2	6	[7]
