= 2018 Tallahassee Tennis Challenger – Doubles =

Doubles
- 2018 Tallahassee Tennis Challenger

Final
- Champions: (United States) Robert Galloway (United States) Denis Kudla
- Runners-up: (Spain) Enrique López Pérez (India) Jeevan Nedunchezhiyan
- Score: 6–3, 6–1

Events
Singles	Doubles
- Tallahassee Tennis Challenger

Scott Lipsky and Leander Paes were the defending champions but chose not to defend their title.

Robert Galloway and Denis Kudla won the title after defeating Enrique López Pérez and Jeevan Nedunchezhiyan 6–3, 6–1 in the final.

== Seeds ==
1. (United Kingdom) Luke Bambridge / (United Kingdom) Jonny O'Mara (semifinals)
2. (Australia) Marc Polmans / (Australia) Max Purcell (first round)
3. (United States) Evan King / (United States) Nathan Pasha (quarterfinals)
4. (Spain) Enrique López Pérez / (India) Jeevan Nedunchezhiyan (final)

== Draw ==
Key

- Q = Qualifier
- WC = Wild card
- LL = Lucky loser
- Alt = Alternate
- ITF = ITF entry
- PR = Protected ranking
- SR = Special ranking
- SE = Special exempt
- JE = Junior exempt
- JR = Junior Accelerator Programme entrant
- CO = College Accelerator Programme entrant
- NG = Next Gen Accelerator Program entrant
- w/o = Walkover
- r = Retired
- d = Defaulted

First round
1	(United Kingdom) L Bambridge (United Kingdom) J O'Mara	6	7^{7}
(Italy) A Arnaboldi (Sweden) A Siljeström	3	6^{4}
(United States) C Harrison (Canada) P Polansky	5	6	[10]
(Brazil) G Clezar (Brazil) JP Sorgi	7	3	[6]
4	(Spain) E López Pérez (India) J Nedunchezhiyan	6	7^{7}
Q	(Italy) Erik Crepaldi (Germany) P Torebko	4	6^{4}
(Uruguay) M Cuevas (Bolivia) H Dellien	6	6
WC	(United States) JC Aragone (Spain) P Riba	4	2
(United States) N Lammons (United States) A Lawson	6	2	[8]
(United States) M Krueger (United States) H Reese	4	6	[10]
WC	(United States) A Reed (Slovenia) B Rola	1	1
3	(United States) E King (United States) N Pasha	6	6
(Chile) C Garín (Australia) A Santillan	6	7
WC	(Burundi) GO Iradukunda (France) L Poullain	3	5
(United States) R Galloway (United States) D Kudla	6	6
2	(Australia) M Polmans (Australia) M Purcell	1	3

Quarterfinals
1	(United Kingdom) L Bambridge (United Kingdom) J O'Mara	7	6
(United States) C Harrison (Canada) P Polansky	5	4
4	(Spain) E López Pérez (India) J Nedunchezhiyan	6	4	[10]
(Uruguay) M Cuevas (Bolivia) H Dellien	3	6	[7]
(United States) M Krueger (United States) H Reese	6^{2}	6	[10]
3	(United States) E King (United States) N Pasha	7^{7}	3	[8]
(Chile) C Garín (Australia) A Santillan
(United States) R Galloway (United States) D Kudla	w/o

Semifinals
1	(United Kingdom) L Bambridge (United Kingdom) J O'Mara	4	4
4	(Spain) E López Pérez (India) J Nedunchezhiyan	6	6
(United States) M Krueger (United States) H Reese	6	1	[4]
(United States) R Galloway (United States) D Kudla	4	6	[10]

Final
4	(Spain) E López Pérez (India) J Nedunchezhiyan	3	1
(United States) R Galloway (United States) D Kudla	6	6
