= 2017 Tallahassee Tennis Challenger – Doubles =

Doubles
- 2017 Tallahassee Tennis Challenger

Final
- Champions: (United States) Scott Lipsky (India) Leander Paes
- Runners-up: (Argentina) Máximo González (Argentina) Leonardo Mayer
- Score: 4–6, 7–6^{(7–5)}, [10–7]

Events
Singles	Doubles
- Tallahassee Tennis Challenger

Dennis Novikov and Julio Peralta were the defending champions but only Novikov chose to defend his title, partnering Stefan Kozlov. Novikov lost in the quarterfinals to Gonzalo Escobar and Roberto Quiroz.

Scott Lipsky and Leander Paes won the title after defeating Máximo González and Leonardo Mayer 4–6, 7–6^{(7–5)}, [10–7] in the final.

== Seeds ==
1. (United States) Scott Lipsky / (India) Leander Paes (champions)
2. (Australia) Matt Reid / (Australia) John-Patrick Smith (first round)
3. (Argentina) Máximo González / (Argentina) Leonardo Mayer (final)
4. (Canada) Peter Polansky / (United Kingdom) Neal Skupski (first round)

== Draw ==
Key

- Q = Qualifier
- WC = Wild card
- LL = Lucky loser
- Alt = Alternate
- ITF = ITF entry
- PR = Protected ranking
- SR = Special ranking
- SE = Special exempt
- JE = Junior exempt
- JR = Junior Accelerator Programme entrant
- CO = College Accelerator Programme entrant
- NG = Next Gen Accelerator Program entrant
- w/o = Walkover
- r = Retired
- d = Defaulted

First round
1	(United States) S Lipsky (India) L Paes	6	6
WC	(United States) R Shane (United States) Wil Spencer	4	4
(Mexico) H Hach Verdugo (Canada) D Shapovalov	5	3
(Argentina) G Andreozzi (Dominican Republic) J Hernández-Fernández	7	6
4	(Canada) P Polansky (United Kingdom) N Skupski	3	6	[7]
(United States) S Kozlov (United States) D Novikov	6	1	[10]
LL	(Ecuador) G Escobar (Ecuador) R Quiroz	7^{7}	4	[10]
LL	(Brazil) A Ghem (Colombia) A González	6^{1}	6	[4]
Q	(Philippines) R Gonzales (United States) A Lawson	6	4	[10]
(Latvia) M Lībietis (United States) M Schnur	4	6	[8]
WC	(United States) S Bangoura (United States) M McDonald	2	2
3	(Argentina) M González (Argentina) L Mayer	6	6
(United Kingdom) L Bambridge (United States) M Krueger	4	6	[10]
WC	(United States) E King (Zimbabwe) B Lock	6	3	[6]
(Australia) Jarryd Chaplin (United States) T Sandgren	3	6	[10]
2	(Australia) M Reid (Australia) J-P Smith	6	4	[8]

Quarterfinals
1	(United States) S Lipsky (India) L Paes	w/o
(Argentina) G Andreozzi (Dominican Republic) J Hernández-Fernández
(United States) S Kozlov (United States) D Novikov	1	4
LL	(Ecuador) G Escobar (Ecuador) R Quiroz	6	6
Q	(Philippines) R Gonzales (United States) A Lawson	6	0	[8]
3	(Argentina) M González (Argentina) L Mayer	3	6	[10]
(United Kingdom) L Bambridge (United States) M Krueger	6	7
(Australia) J Chaplin (United States) T Sandgren	3	5

Semifinals
1	(United States) S Lipsky (India) L Paes	6	6^{4}	[10]
LL	(Ecuador) G Escobar (Ecuador) R Quiroz	1	7^{7}	[3]
3	(Argentina) M González (Argentina) L Mayer	6	6
(United Kingdom) L Bambridge (United States) M Krueger	4	3

Final
1	(United States) S Lipsky (India) L Paes	4	7^{7}	[10]
3	(Argentina) M González (Argentina) L Mayer	6	6^{5}	[7]
