= 2013 Tallahassee Tennis Challenger – Singles =

Singles
- 2013 Tallahassee Tennis Challenger

Final
- Champion: (United States) Denis Kudla
- Runner-up: (Germany) Cedrik-Marcel Stebe
- Score: 6–3, 6–3

Events
Singles	Doubles
← 2012 ·	Tallahassee Tennis Challenger	· 2014 →

Tim Smyczek was the defending champion, but lost to Cedrik-Marcel Stebe in the semifinals.
Denis Kudla defeated Stebe 6–3, 6–3 in the final to win the title.

== Seeds ==
1. (United States) Michael Russell (first round)
2. (United States) Ryan Harrison (semifinals)
3. (United States) Wayne Odesnik (second round)
4. (United States) Jack Sock (first round)
5. (United States) Tim Smyczek (semifinals)
6. (United States) Steve Johnson (first round)
7. (United States) Denis Kudla (champion)
8. (Germany) Mischa Zverev (second round)

== Draw ==
=== Key ===
- Q = Qualifier
- WC = Wild card
- LL = Lucky loser
- Alt = Alternate
- ITF = ITF entry
- PR = Protected ranking
- SR = Special ranking
- SE = Special exempt
- JE = Junior exempt
- JR = Junior Accelerator Programme entrant
- CO = College Accelerator Programme entrant
- NG = Next Gen Accelerator Program entrant
- w/o = Walkover
- r = Retired
- d = Defaulted

=== Finals ===
Semifinals
(Germany) Cedrik-Marcel Stebe	7	6
5	(United States) Tim Smyczek	5	0
7	(United States) Denis Kudla	6	5	6
2	(United States) Ryan Harrison	4	7	3

Final
(Germany) Cedrik-Marcel Stebe	3	3
7	(United States) Denis Kudla	6	6

=== Top half ===
First round
1	(United States) M Russell	6^{6}	3
(South Korea) S-y Jeong	7^{8}	6
(Germany) C-M Stebe	2	6	6
(United States) T Sandgren	6	3	3
(Canada) F Dancevic	7	6
Q	(Serbia) I Bozoljac	5	3
Q	(United States) C Harrison	7^{7}	6
6	(United States) S Johnson	6^{4}	1
4	(United States) J Sock	6	2	3
(United States) A Kuznetsov	3	6	6
(Canada) P Polansky	6	6
WC	(United States) Dominic Cotrone	2	4
WC	(Senegal) Salif Kanté	2	0
(Austria) G Melzer	6	6
Q	(Australia) G Jones	3	5
5	(United States) T Smyczek	6	7

Second round
(South Korea) S-y Jeong	6	3	0
(Germany) C-M Stebe	4	6	6
(Canada) F Dancevic	6	6
Q	(United States) C Harrison	4	3
(United States) A Kuznetsov	6	6^{4}	6
(Canada) P Polansky	2	7^{7}	1
(Austria) G Melzer	6^{6}	0
5	(United States) T Smyczek	7^{8}	6

Quarterfinals
(Germany) C-M Stebe	6	6
(Canada) F Dancevic	4	3
(United States) A Kuznetsov	4	0^{r}
5	(United States) T Smyczek	6	0

Semifinals
(Germany) C-M Stebe	7	6
5	(United States) T Smyczek	5	0

=== Bottom half ===
First round
7	(United States) D Kudla	7^{7}	6
(India) S Devvarman	6^{4}	4
(United States) B Klahn	6	6
(Colombia) N Barrientos	3	2
(Argentina) F Argüello	7	7^{7}
WC	(United States) Reid Carleton	5	6^{4}
(Ukraine) D Molchanov	6	3	4
3	(United States) W Odesnik	4	6	6
8	(Germany) M Zverev	6	6
(Georgia (country)) N Basilashvili	4	0
Q	(New Zealand) M Venus	5	4
(United States) D Young	7	6
WC	(United States) A Krajicek	5	1
(United Kingdom) A Bogdanovic	7	6
(Japan) T Daniel	3	7^{7}	6^{4}
2	(United States) R Harrison	6	6^{5}	7^{7}

Second round
7	(United States) D Kudla	6	2	6
(United States) B Klahn	4	6	4
(Argentina) F Argüello	6	6
3	(United States) W Odesnik	3	3
8	(Germany) M Zverev	2	2
(United States) D Young	6	6
(United Kingdom) A Bogdanovic	5	5
2	(United States) R Harrison	7	7

Quarterfinals
7	(United States) D Kudla	7^{7}	6
(Argentina) F Argüello	6^{3}	4
(United States) D Young	6^{5}	4
2	(United States) R Harrison	7^{7}	6

Semifinals
7	(United States) D Kudla	6	5	6
2	(United States) R Harrison	4	7	3
