= 2023 Tallahassee Tennis Challenger =

- Date: 17–23 April
- Edition: 23rd
- Surface: Green clay
- Location: Tallahassee, Florida, United States

Champions

Singles
- (Belgium) Zizou Bergs

Doubles
- (Argentina) Federico Agustín Gómez / (Argentina) Nicolás Kicker
← 2022 ·	Tallahassee Tennis Challenger	· 2024 →

The 2023 Tallahassee Tennis Challenger was a professional tennis tournament played on green clay courts. It was the 23rd edition of the tournament which was part of the 2023 ATP Challenger Tour. It took place in Tallahassee, Florida, United States between April 17 and April 23, 2023.

== Singles main-draw entrants ==
=== Seeds ===
Country	Player	Rank^{1}	Seed
CHN	Zhang Zhizhen	95	1
ARG	Camilo Ugo Carabelli	131	2
GER	Dominik Koepfer	154	3
ARG	Facundo Díaz Acosta	158	4
TPE	Wu Tung-lin	164	5
BEL	Zizou Bergs	165	6
FRA	Enzo Couacaud	183	7
JPN	Rio Noguchi	208	8

- ^{1} Rankings as of April 10, 2023.

=== Other entrants ===
The following players received wildcards into the singles main draw:

- (United States) Kyle Kang
- (United States) Bruno Kuzuhara
- (United States) Thai-Son Kwiatkowski

The following players received entry into the singles main draw using protected rankings:

- (United States) Bjorn Fratangelo
- (United States) Christian Harrison
- (France) Lucas Pouille

The following player received entry into the singles main draw as an alternate:

- (Kazakhstan) Dmitry Popko

The following players received entry from the qualifying draw:

- (United States) Martin Damm
- (Argentina) Federico Agustín Gómez
- (France) Kyrian Jacquet
- (United States) Strong Kirchheimer
- (United States) Patrick Kypson
- (Northern Mariana Islands) Colin Sinclair

== Champions ==
=== Singles ===
- (Belgium) Zizou Bergs def. (Chinese Taipei) Wu Tung-lin 7–5, 6–2.

=== Doubles ===
- (Argentina) Federico Agustín Gómez / (Argentina) Nicolás Kicker def. (United States) William Blumberg / (Venezuela) Luis David Martínez 7–6^{(7–2)}, 4–6, [13–11].
