= 2011 Tallahassee Tennis Challenger =

- Date: April 11 – April 16
- Edition: 3rd
- Location: Tallahassee, United States

Champions

Singles
- (United States) Donald Young

Doubles
- (Canada) Vasek Pospisil / (United States) Bobby Reynolds
← 2010 ·	Tallahassee Tennis Challenger	· 2012 →

The 2011 Tallahassee Tennis Challenger was a professional tennis tournament played on outdoor hard courts. It was the third edition of the tournament which was part of the 2011 ATP Challenger Tour. It took place in the Forestmeadows Tennis Complex in Tallahassee, United States between April 11 and April 16, 2011.

== ATP entrants ==
=== Seeds ===
Nationality	Player	Ranking*	Seeding
GER	Rainer Schüttler	87	1
JPN	Go Soeda	91	2
USA	Michael Russell	92	3
~~USA~~	~~Ryan Sweeting~~	~~93~~	~~4~~
ARG	Brian Dabul	104	5
USA	Alex Bogomolov Jr.	107	6
USA	Donald Young	120	7
AUS	Marinko Matosevic	139	8

- Rankings are as of April 4, 2011.

=== Other entrants ===
The following players received wildcards into the singles main draw:

- (United States) James Blake
- (United States) Andrea Collarini
- (United States) Denis Kudla
- (United States) Michael Shabaz

The following players received entry from the qualifying draw:

- (United States) Wayne Odesnik
- (United States) Greg Ouellette
- (Canada) Vasek Pospisil
- (South Korea) Daniel Yoo
- (United States) Nicholas Monroe (as a Lucky loser)
- (Australia) Joseph Sirianni (as a Lucky loser)

== Champions ==
=== Singles ===
(United States) Donald Young def. (United States) Wayne Odesnik, 6–4, 3–6, 6–3

=== Doubles ===
(Canada) Vasek Pospisil / (United States) Bobby Reynolds def. (Japan) Go Soeda / (United Kingdom) James Ward, 6–2, 6–4
