= 2016 Tallahassee Tennis Challenger – Doubles =

Doubles
- 2016 Tallahassee Tennis Challenger

Final
- Champion: (United States) Dennis Novikov; (Chile) Julio Peralta
- Runner-up: (Australia) Peter Luczak; (Australia) Marc Polmans
- Score: 3–6, 6–4, [12–10]

Events
| Singles | Doubles |
- Tallahassee Tennis Challenger

Dennis Novikov and Julio Peralta were the defending champions and successfully defended their title, defeating Peter Luczak and Marc Polmans 3–6, 6–4, [12–10] in the final.

== Seeds ==
1. (United States) Dennis Novikov / (Chile) Julio Peralta (champions)
2. (South Africa) Dean O'Brien / (United States) Donald Young (semifinals)
3. (India) Purav Raja / (India) Divij Sharan (semifinals)
4. (Canada) Philip Bester / (Canada) Peter Polansky (second round)

== Draw ==
Key

- Q = Qualifier
- WC = Wild card
- LL = Lucky loser
- Alt = Alternate
- ITF = ITF entry
- PR = Protected ranking
- SR = Special ranking
- SE = Special exempt
- JE = Junior exempt
- JR = Junior Accelerator Programme entrant
- CO = College Accelerator Programme entrant
- NG = Next Gen Accelerator Program entrant
- w/o = Walkover
- r = Retired
- d = Defaulted

First round

Quarterfinals

Semifinals

Final

1
- (United States) D Novikov
- (Chile) J Peralta
w/o

- (Argentina) F Argüello
- (Argentina) T Lipovšek Puches

1
- (United States) D Novikov
- (Chile) J Peralta
6
6

- (Chile) N Jarry
- (Ecuador) G Lapentti
w/o

- (Chile) N Jarry
- (Ecuador) G Lapentti
1
4

- (Georgia (country)) N Basilashvili
- (Dominican Republic) J Hernández

1
- (United States) D Novikov
- (Chile) J Peralta
4
6
[10]

3
- (India) P Raja
- (India) D Sharan
6
7^{7}

3
- (India) P Raja
- (India) D Sharan
6
3
[5]

- (United States) S Bangoura
- (New Zealand) J Statham
4
6^{4}

3
- (India) P Raja
- (India) D Sharan
6
6

- (Colombia) A Falla
- (Venezuela) LD Martínez
6^{5}
6
[7]

WC
(Zimbabwe) B Lock
(Mexico) MA Núñez
4
3

WC
(Zimbabwe) B Lock
(Mexico) Marco Aurelio Núñez
7^{7}
2
[10]

1
- (United States) D Novikov
- (Chile) J Peralta
3
6
[12]

- (Australia) P Luczak
- (Australia) M Polmans
6
7^{7}

- (Australia) P Luczak
- (Australia) M Polmans
6
4
[10]

- (France) Q Halys
- (France) A Michon
3
6^{4}

- (Australia) P Luczak
- (Australia) M Polmans
4
6
[10]

- (United States) M Krueger
- (United States) T Sandgren
3
2

4
- (Canada) P Bester
- (Canada) P Polansky
6
2
[7]

4
- (Canada) P Bester
- (Canada) P Polansky
6
6

- (Australia) P Luczak
- (Australia) M Polmans
6
7

WC
- (United Kingdom) M Phillips
- (United Kingdom) J Ward
6
6

2
- (South Africa) D O'Brien
- (United States) D Young
3
5

- (South Africa) R Roelofse
- (United Kingdom) D Walsh
4
4

WC
- (United Kingdom) M Phillips
- (United Kingdom) J Ward
6
1
[14]

WC
(Tunisia) MA Dougaz
(United States) Jose Gracia
1
6^{3}

2
- (South Africa) D O'Brien
- (United States) D Young
4
6
[16]

2
- (South Africa) D O'Brien
- (United States) D Young
6
7^{7}
