= 2016 Tallahassee Tennis Challenger =

- Date: 25 April – 1 May
- Edition: 17th
- Draw: 32S / 16D
- Prize money: $50,000
- Surface: Green clay
- Location: Tallahassee, Florida, United States

Champions

Singles
- (France) Quentin Halys

Doubles
- (United States) Dennis Novikov / (Chile) Julio Peralta
- Tallahassee Tennis Challenger

The 2016 Tallahassee Tennis Challenger was a professional tennis tournament played on green clay courts. It was the 17th edition of the tournament which was part of the 2016 ATP Challenger Tour. It took place in Tallahassee, Florida, United States between April 25 and May 1, 2016.

== Singles main-draw entrants ==
=== Seeds ===
Country	Player	Rank^{1}	Seed
USA	Donald Young	84	1
AUT	Gerald Melzer	112	2
USA	Tim Smyczek	119	3
USA	Bjorn Fratangelo	126	4
GEO	Nikoloz Basilashvili	130	5
ARG	Facundo Argüello	143	6
USA	Jared Donaldson	147	7
USA	Dennis Novikov	148	8

- ^{1} Rankings as of April 18, 2016

=== Other entrants ===
The following players received wildcards into the singles main draw:

- (Zimbabwe) Benjamin Lock
- (United States) Brian Baker
- (United States) Eric Quigley
- (United States) Tennys Sandgren

The following players received entry into the singles main draw as special exempts:

- (United States) Ernesto Escobedo
- (Chile) Nicolás Jarry

The following players received entry from the qualifying draw:

- (United States) Sekou Bangoura
- (Ecuador) Emilio Gómez
- (Republic of Ireland) James McGee
- (United States) Stefan Kozlov

== Champions ==
=== Singles ===
- (France) Quentin Halys def. (United States) Frances Tiafoe, 6–7^{(6–8)}, 6–4, 6–2

=== Doubles ===
- (United States) Dennis Novikov / (Chile) Julio Peralta def. (Australia) Peter Luczak / (Australia) Marc Polmans, 3–6, 6–4, [12–10]
