= 2013 Tallahassee Tennis Challenger – Doubles =

Doubles
- 2013 Tallahassee Tennis Challenger

Final
- Champions: (United States) Austin Krajicek (United States) Tennys Sandgren
- Runners-up: (Australia) Greg Jones (Canada) Peter Polansky
- Score: 1–6, 6–2, [10–8]

Events
Singles	Doubles
- Tallahassee Tennis Challenger

Martin Emmrich and Andreas Siljeström were the defending champions but decided not to participate.
Austin Krajicek and Tennys Sandgren defeated Greg Jones and Peter Polansky 1–6, 6–2, [10–8] in the final to win the title.

== Seeds ==
1. (United States) Austin Krajicek / (United States) Tennys Sandgren (champions)
2. (United States) Alex Kuznetsov / (Germany) Mischa Zverev (withdrew)
3. (Colombia) Nicolás Barrientos / (Ukraine) Denys Molchanov (first round)
4. (United Kingdom) David Rice / (United Kingdom) Sean Thornley (semifinals)

== Draw ==
Key

- Q = Qualifier
- WC = Wild card
- LL = Lucky loser
- Alt = Alternate
- ITF = ITF entry
- PR = Protected ranking
- SR = Special ranking
- SE = Special exempt
- JE = Junior exempt
- JR = Junior Accelerator Programme entrant
- CO = College Accelerator Programme entrant
- NG = Next Gen Accelerator Program entrant
- w/o = Walkover
- r = Retired
- d = Defaulted

=== Draw ===
First round
(Georgia (country)) N Basilashvili (Austria) G Melzer	4	6	[10]
(United States) A Reed (United States) J Sock	6	3	[7]
4	(United Kingdom) D Rice (United Kingdom) S Thornley	1	6	[10]
(Philippines) R Gonzales (Australia) Chris Letcher	6	2	[6]
WC	(Guatemala) Andrés Bucaro (South Africa) B Lock	3	4
(United States) C Harrison (New Zealand) M Venus	6	6
(United States) Jean-Yves Aubone (United States) V Mirzadeh	6	7^{7}
(United States) Blake Davis (United States) R Harrison	2	6^{3}
(Australia) G Jones (Canada) P Polansky	6	6^{4}	[10]
3	(Colombia) N Barrientos (Ukraine) D Molchanov	4	7^{7}	[6]
WC	(Senegal) Salif Kanté (Zimbabwe) Takura Happy	6	6
(United States) Dante Saleh (United States) Mico Santiago	4	4
(United States) S Bangoura (United States) Reid Carleton	w/o
2	(United States) A Kuznetsov (Germany) M Zverev

Quarterfinals
1	(United States) A Krajicek (United States) T Sandgren	6	6
(Georgia (country)) N Basilashvili (Austria) G Melzer	4	4
4	(United Kingdom) D Rice (United Kingdom) S Thornley	w/o
(United States) C Harrison (New Zealand) M Venus
(United States) J-Y Aubone (United States) V Mirzadeh	3	4
(Australia) G Jones (Canada) P Polansky	6	6
WC	(Senegal) S Kanté (Zimbabwe) T Happy	3	2
(United States) S Bangoura (United States) R Carleton	6	6

Semifinals
1	(United States) A Krajicek (United States) T Sandgren	6	7^{9}
4	(United Kingdom) D Rice (United Kingdom) S Thornley	4	6^{7}
(Australia) G Jones (Canada) P Polansky	7	6
(United States) S Bangoura (United States) R Carleton	5	1

Final
1	(United States) A Krajicek (United States) T Sandgren	1	6	[10]
(Australia) G Jones (Canada) P Polansky	6	2	[8]
