= 2013 Tallahassee Tennis Challenger =

- Date: 29 April – 5 May
- Edition: 14th
- Draw: 32S / 16D
- Prize money: $50,000
- Surface: Green clay
- Location: Tallahassee, United States

Champions

Singles
- (United States) Denis Kudla

Doubles
- (United States) Austin Krajicek / (United States) Tennys Sandgren
| ← 2012 · | Tallahassee Tennis Challenger | · 2014 → |

The 2013 Tallahassee Tennis Challenger was a professional tennis tournament played on hard courts. It was the 14th edition of the tournament, which was part of the 2013 ATP Challenger Tour. It occurred in Tallahassee, United States, between April 29 and May 5, 2013.

== Singles main-draw entrants ==
=== Seeds ===
| Country | Player | Rank^{1} | Seed |
|---|---|---|---|
| USA | Michael Russell | 96 | 1 |
| USA | Ryan Harrison | 100 | 2 |
| USA | Wayne Odesnik | 117 | 3 |
| USA | Jack Sock | 120 | 4 |
| USA | Tim Smyczek | 123 | 5 |
| USA | Steve Johnson | 128 | 6 |
| USA | Denis Kudla | 143 | 7 |
| GER | Mischa Zverev | 146 | 8 |

- ^{1} Rankings are as of April 22, 2013.

=== Other entrants ===
The following players received wildcards into the singles main draw:

- (United States) Reid Carleton
- (United States) Dominic Cotrone
- (Senegal) Salif Kanté
- (United States) Austin Krajicek

The following players received entry from the qualifying draw:

- (Serbia) Ilija Bozoljac
- (United States) Christian Harrison
- (Australia) Greg Jones
- (New Zealand) Michael Venus

== Doubles main-draw entrants ==
=== Seeds ===
| Country | Player | Country | Player | Rank^{1} | Seed |
|---|---|---|---|---|---|
| USA | Austin Krajicek | USA | Tennys Sandgren | 295 | 1 |
| USA | Alex Kuznetsov | GER | Mischa Zverev | 339 | 2 |
| COL | Nicolás Barrientos | UKR | Denys Molchanov | 412 | 3 |
| GBR | David Rice | GBR | Sean Thornley | 444 | 4 |

- ^{1} Rankings as of April 22, 2013.

=== Other entrants ===
The following pairs received wildcards into the doubles main draw:

- (Guatemala) Andrés Bucaro / (South Africa) Benjamin Lock
- (Senegal) Salif Kanté / (Zimbabwe) Takura Happy

== Champions ==
=== Singles ===
- (United States) Denis Kudla def. (Germany) Cedrik-Marcel Stebe, 6–3, 6–3

=== Doubles ===
- (United States) Austin Krajicek / (United States) Tennys Sandgren def. (Australia) Greg Jones / (Canada) Peter Polansky, 1–6, 6–2, [10–8]
