= 2012 Tallahassee Tennis Challenger =

- Date: 2–8 April
- Edition: 13th
- Surface: Hard
- Location: Tallahassee, Florida, United States

Champions

Singles
- (United States) Tim Smyczek

Doubles
- (Germany) Martin Emmrich / (Sweden) Andreas Siljeström
← 2011 ·	Tallahassee Tennis Challenger	· 2013 →

The 2012 Tallahassee Tennis Challenger was a professional tennis tournament played on hard courts. It was the 13th edition of the tournament which was part of the 2012 ATP Challenger Tour. It took place in Tallahassee, Florida, United States between April 2 and April 8, 2012.

== Singles main-draw entrants ==
=== Seeds ===
Country	Player	Rank^{1}	Seed
TPE	Yen-Hsun Lu	59	1
USA	Ryan Sweeting	86	2
RUS	Igor Kunitsyn	90	3
JPN	Tatsuma Ito	94	4
CAN	Vasek Pospisil	111	5
USA	Wayne Odesnik	113	6
BRA	Rogério Dutra da Silva	117	7
USA	Bobby Reynolds	118	8

- ^{1} Rankings are as of March 19, 2012.

=== Other entrants ===
The following players received wildcards into the singles main draw:

- (United States) Brian Baker
- (United States) Vahid Mirzadeh
- (United States) Tennys Sandgren
- (United States) Ryan Sweeting

The following players received entry as an alternate into the singles main draw:

- (Canada) Frank Dancevic

The following players received entry from the qualifying draw:

- (Germany) Martin Emmrich
- (Australia) John Peers
- (New Zealand) Artem Sitak
- (United States) Blake Strode

The following players received entry from the qualifying draw as a lucky loser:

- (Romania) Cătălin Gârd
- (United States) Daniel Kosakowski

== Champions ==
=== Singles ===
- (United States) Tim Smyczek def. (Canada) Frank Dancevic, 7–5, retired

=== Doubles ===
- (Germany) Martin Emmrich / (Sweden) Andreas Siljeström def. (New Zealand) Artem Sitak / (United States) Blake Strode, 6–2, 7–6^{(7–4)}
