= 2021 Tallahassee Tennis Challenger – Doubles =

Doubles
- 2021 Tallahassee Tennis Challenger

Final
- Champions: (Brazil) Orlando Luz (Brazil) Rafael Matos
- Runners-up: (United States) Sekou Bangoura (United States) Donald Young
- Score: 7–6^{(7–2)}, 6–2

Events
Singles	Doubles
- Tallahassee Tennis Challenger

Roberto Maytín and Fernando Romboli were the defending champions but chose not to defend their title.

Orlando Luz and Rafael Matos won the title after defeating Sekou Bangoura and Donald Young 7–6^{(7–2)}, 6–2 in the final.

== Seeds ==
1. (Brazil) Orlando Luz / (Brazil) Rafael Matos (champions)
2. (Philippines) Treat Huey / (Netherlands) Sem Verbeek (quarterfinals)
3. (Australia) Matthew Ebden / (United States) Dennis Novikov (quarterfinals)
4. (United States) Evan King / (United States) Hunter Reese (first round)

== Draw ==
Key

- Q = Qualifier
- WC = Wild card
- LL = Lucky loser
- Alt = Alternate
- ITF = ITF entry
- PR = Protected ranking
- SR = Special ranking
- SE = Special exempt
- JE = Junior exempt
- JR = Junior Accelerator Programme entrant
- CO = College Accelerator Programme entrant
- NG = Next Gen Accelerator Program entrant
- w/o = Walkover
- r = Retired
- d = Defaulted

First round
1	(Brazil) O Luz (Brazil) R Matos	6	3	[10]
(Chinese Taipei) J Jung (United States) M Krueger	2	6	[8]
WC	(United States) M Damm (United States) T Kodat	4	2
(Brazil) P Sakamoto (Brazil) T Seyboth Wild	6	6
3	(Australia) M Ebden (United States) D Novikov	6	6
(Canada) P Polansky (Canada) B Schnur	3	3
(Argentina) F Mena (Brazil) J Menezes	6	6
(United States) D Kudla (United States) T-S Kwiatkowski	4	4
WC	(Dominican Republic) R Cid Subervi (Belgium) M Geerts	6^{5}	4
(Croatia) A Pavić (South Africa) R Roelofse	7^{7}	6
WC	(United States) S Bangoura (United States) D Young	6	4	[10]
4	(United States) E King (United States) H Reese	4	6	[6]
(Kazakhstan) D Popko (Kazakhstan) D Yevseyev	3	1
(United States) N Pasha (United States) M Schnur	6	6
(India) S Balaji (India) J Nedunchezhiyan	4	5
2	(Philippines) T Huey (Netherlands) S Verbeek	6	7

Quarterfinals
1	(Brazil) O Luz (Brazil) R Matos	w/o
(Brazil) P Sakamoto (Brazil) T Seyboth Wild
3	(Australia) M Ebden (United States) D Novikov	4	7^{7}	[7]
(Argentina) F Mena (Brazil) J Menezes	6	6^{3}	[10]
(Croatia) A Pavić (South Africa) R Roelofse	6	4	[6]
WC	(United States) S Bangoura (United States) D Young	3	6	[10]
(United States) N Pasha (United States) M Schnur	6	6^{1}	[10]
2	(Philippines) T Huey (Netherlands) S Verbeek	3	7^{7}	[7]

Semifinals
1	(Brazil) O Luz (Brazil) R Matos	6	6
(Argentina) F Mena (Brazil) J Menezes	3	3
WC	(United States) S Bangoura (United States) D Young	6	2	[14]
(United States) N Pasha (United States) M Schnur	3	6	[12]

Final
1	(Brazil) O Luz (Brazil) R Matos	7^{7}	6
WC	(United States) S Bangoura (United States) D Young	6^{2}	2
