= 2021 Tallahassee Tennis Challenger =

- Date: 19–25 April
- Edition: 21st
- Surface: Green clay
- Location: Tallahassee, Florida, United States

Champions

Singles
- (United States) Jenson Brooksby

Doubles
- (Brazil) Orlando Luz / (Brazil) Rafael Matos
- Tallahassee Tennis Challenger

The 2021 Tallahassee Tennis Challenger was a professional tennis tournament played on green clay courts. It was the 21st edition of the tournament which was part of the 2021 ATP Challenger Tour. It took place in Tallahassee, Florida, United States between April 19 and April 25, 2021.

== Singles main-draw entrants ==
=== Seeds ===
Country	Player	Rank^{1}	Seed
BRA	Thiago Seyboth Wild	123	1
USA	Denis Kudla	124	2
IND	Prajnesh Gunneswaran	138	3
TPE	Jason Jung	151	4
CRO	Ivo Karlović	170	5
ARG	Juan Manuel Cerúndolo	174	6
KAZ	Dmitry Popko	180	7
USA	Michael Mmoh	181	8

- ^{1} Rankings as of April 12, 2021.

=== Other entrants ===
The following players received wildcards into the singles main draw:

- (United States) Martin Damm
- (United States) Ryan Harrison
- (United States) Toby Kodat

The following players received entry into the singles main draw as alternates:

- (Brazil) Thomaz Bellucci
- (Brazil) Pedro Sakamoto

The following players received entry from the qualifying draw:

- (Romania) Filip Jianu
- (United States) Alexander Ritschard
- (United States) Alex Rybakov
- (Argentina) Agustín Velotti

The following player received entry as a lucky loser:

- (United States) Donald Young

== Champions ==
=== Singles ===
- (United States) Jenson Brooksby def. (United States) Bjorn Fratangelo 6–3, 4–6, 6–3.

=== Doubles ===
- (Brazil) Orlando Luz / (Brazil) Rafael Matos def. (United States) Sekou Bangoura / (United States) Donald Young 7–6^{(7–2)}, 6–2.
