= 2024 Tallahassee Tennis Challenger – Singles =

Singles
- 2024 Tallahassee Tennis Challenger

Final
- Champion: (Belgium) Zizou Bergs
- Runner-up: (United States) Mitchell Krueger
- Score: 6–4, 7–6^{(11–9)}

Events
Singles	Doubles
- Tallahassee Tennis Challenger

Zizou Bergs was the defending champion and successfully defended his title after defeating Mitchell Krueger 6–4, 7–6^{(11–9)} in the final.

== Seeds ==
1. (United States) J. J. Wolf (first round)
2. (Belgium) Zizou Bergs (champion)
3. (United States) Patrick Kypson (first round)
4. (United States) Denis Kudla (first round)
5. (Australia) Marc Polmans (withdrew)
6. (United States) Martin Damm (first round)
7. (Switzerland) Alexander Ritschard (quarterfinals)
8. (United States) Tristan Boyer (first round)

== Draw ==
Key

- Q = Qualifier
- WC = Wild card
- LL = Lucky loser
- Alt = Alternate
- ITF = ITF entry
- PR = Protected ranking
- SR = Special ranking
- SE = Special exempt
- JE = Junior exempt
- JR = Junior Accelerator Programme entrant
- CO = College Accelerator Programme entrant
- NG = Next Gen Accelerator Program entrant
- w/o = Walkover
- r = Retired
- d = Defaulted

=== Finals ===
Semifinals
(United States) Mitchell Krueger	6	3	6
WC	(United States) Stefan Kozlov	3	6	1
(France) Calvin Hemery	6	4	1^{r}
2	(Belgium) Zizou Bergs	3	6	4

Final
(United States) Mitchell Krueger	4	6^{9}
2	(Belgium) Zizou Bergs	6	7^{11}

=== Top half ===
First round
1	(United States) JJ Wolf	5	6^{6}
(United Kingdom) H Searle	7	7^{8}
(Italy) G Fonio	2	4
(Austria) JJ Schwärzler	6	6
(United States) M Krueger	6	7^{7}
(United States) E Quinn	1	6^{2}
(United States) T-S Kwiatkowski	2	6	6
8	(United States) T Boyer	6	2	4
4	(United States) D Kudla	6^{6}	4
(Lebanon) H Habib	7^{8}	6
(United Kingdom) O Crawford	6	7^{7}
(Kazakhstan) D Popko	0	6^{2}
(South Korea) G Campaña Lee	6	3	0
WC	(United States) S Kozlov	4	6	6
(United States) T Sandgren	7	6
6	(United States) M Damm	5	3

Second round
(United Kingdom) H Searle	1	6^{5}
(Austria) JJ Schwärzler	6	7^{7}
(United States) M Krueger	7^{7}	6
(United States) T-S Kwiatkowski	6^{3}	2
(Lebanon) H Habib	3	4
(United Kingdom) O Crawford	6	6
WC	(United States) S Kozlov	6	6^{5}	6
(United States) T Sandgren	2	7^{7}	1

Quarterfinals
(Austria) JJ Schwärzler	5	6^{4}
(United States) M Krueger	7	7^{7}
(United Kingdom) O Crawford	2	2
WC	(United States) S Kozlov	6	6

Semifinals
(United States) M Krueger	6	3	6
WC	(United States) S Kozlov	3	6	1

=== Bottom half ===
First round
7	(Switzerland) A Ritschard	6	7
Q	(United States) B Kuzuhara	4	5
WC	(United States) K Bigun	6	2	4
Q	B Bobrov	4	6	6
WC	(Portugal) D Vale	4	6^{0}
Q	(France) C Denolly	6	7^{7}
(France) C Hemery	7^{7}	6
3	(United States) P Kypson	6^{2}	3
Q	(Ecuador) A Andrade	4	4
(Argentina) FA Gómez	6	6
Q	(Austria) G Melzer	6	6
LL	(United Kingdom) K Edmund	4	1
(France) C Tabur	6	6
Q	(United States) V Lilov	1	1
(United States) T Kodat	4	2
2	(Belgium) Z Bergs	6	6

Second round
7	(Switzerland) A Ritschard	6	3	6
Q	B Bobrov	3	6	1
Q	(France) C Denolly	3	2
(France) C Hemery	6	6
(Argentina) FA Gómez	6	6^{8}	6^{6}
Q	(Austria) G Melzer	4	7^{10}	7^{8}
(France) C Tabur	6^{4}	7	3
2	(Belgium) Z Bergs	7^{7}	5	6

Quarterfinals
7	(Switzerland) A Ritschard	5	7^{7}	4
(France) C Hemery	7	6^{3}	6
Q	(Austria) G Melzer	1	4
2	(Belgium) Z Bergs	6	6

Semifinals
(France) C Hemery	6	4	1^{r}
2	(Belgium) Z Bergs	3	6	4
