= 2010 Tallahassee Tennis Challenger – Singles =

Singles
- 2010 Tallahassee Tennis Challenger

Final
- Champion: (Argentina) Brian Dabul
- Runner-up: (United States) Robby Ginepri
- Score: 4–6, 4–0, Ret.

Events
Singles	Doubles
- Tallahassee Tennis Challenger

John Isner was the defending of champion, but he chose not to participate this year.
Brian Dabul won in the final, after Robby Ginepri retired at the score of 6–4, 0–4.

== Seeds ==
1. (United States) Rajeev Ram (semifinals)
2. (South Africa) Kevin Anderson (withdrew due to tendonitis)
3. (United States) Taylor Dent (first round)
4. (United States) Robby Ginepri (final, retired)
5. (United States) Jesse Levine (first round)
6. (Australia) Carsten Ball (quarterfinals)
7. (United States) Kevin Kim (first round)
8. (United States) Ryan Sweeting (quarterfinals)

== Draw ==
Key

- Q = Qualifier
- WC = Wild card
- LL = Lucky loser
- Alt = Alternate
- ITF = ITF entry
- PR = Protected ranking
- SR = Special ranking
- SE = Special exempt
- JE = Junior exempt
- JR = Junior Accelerator Programme entrant
- CO = College Accelerator Programme entrant
- NG = Next Gen Accelerator Program entrant
- w/o = Walkover
- r = Retired
- d = Defaulted

=== Finals ===
Semifinals
1	(United States) Rajeev Ram	4	3
4	(United States) Robby Ginepri	6	6
(United States) Alex Kuznetsov	4	7	4
(Argentina) Brian Dabul	6	5	6

Final
4	(United States) Robby Ginepri	6	0^{r}
(Argentina) Brian Dabul	4	4

=== Top half ===
First round
1	(United States) R Ram	6	7
WC	(United States) B Evans	4	5
(Germany) T Kamke	7	6
(Chile) P Capdeville	6^{1}	1
Q	(United Kingdom) J Goodall	6	7
(United States) M Yani	4	6^{6}
SE	(Japan) G Soeda	1	2
8	(United States) R Sweeting	6	6
4	(United States) R Ginepri	4	6	6
(United States) R DeHeart	6	3	4
Q	(United Kingdom) J Baker	6	2	4
(Australia) G Jones	2	6	6
Q	(Slovenia) L Gregorc	3	6	3
(Japan) T Ito	6	3	6
PR	(Japan) K Nishikori	6	6^{5}	7
5	(United States) J Levine	3	7	6^{3}

Second round
1	(United States) R Ram	6	6
(Germany) T Kamke	4	4
Q	(United Kingdom) J Goodall	3	3
8	(United States) R Sweeting	6	6
4	(United States) R Ginepri	6	6
(Australia) G Jones	4	4
(Japan) T Ito	6	4	3
PR	(Japan) K Nishikori	4	6	6

Quarterfinals
1	(United States) R Ram	3	6	7
8	(United States) R Sweeting	6	3	6^{6}
4	(United States) R Ginepri	6	6
PR	(Japan) K Nishikori	2	4

Semifinals
1	(United States) R Ram	4	3
4	(United States) R Ginepri	6	6

=== Bottom half ===
First round
6	(Australia) C Ball	4	6	6
(United States) D Young	6	1	4
SE	(Mexico) S González	7	6
Q	(Australia) D Kelly	6^{6}	3
WC	(United States) B Reynolds	6	6
WC	(United States) T Smyczek	3	3
(United States) A Kuznetsov	6	7
3	(United States) T Dent	3	5
7	(United States) K Kim	3	6	6^{4}
ALT	(Australia) N Lindahl	6	3	7
(United States) R Kendrick	7	6
(Australia) C Guccione	6^{6}	3
WC	(United States) J-Y Aubone	4	1
(Canada) P Polansky	6	6
(Argentina) B Dabul	6	6
LL	(Republic of Ireland) C Niland	4	2

Second round
6	(Australia) C Ball	4	6	6
SE	(Mexico) S González	6	1	4
WC	(United States) B Reynolds	3	4
(United States) A Kuznetsov	6	6
ALT	(Australia) N Lindahl	6	7
(United States) R Kendrick	4	6^{3}
(Canada) P Polansky	6^{5}	3
(Argentina) B Dabul	7	6

Quarterfinals
6	(Australia) C Ball	4	7	4
(United States) A Kuznetsov	6	6^{7}	6
ALT	(Australia) N Lindahl	6^{7}	6	5
(Argentina) B Dabul	7	4	7

Semifinals
(United States) A Kuznetsov	4	7	4
(Argentina) B Dabul	6	5	6
