= 2017 Tallahassee Tennis Challenger – Singles =

Singles
- 2017 Tallahassee Tennis Challenger

Final
- Champion: (Slovenia) Blaž Rola
- Runner-up: (India) Ramkumar Ramanathan
- Score: 6–2, 6–7^{(6–8)}, 7–5

Events
Singles	Doubles
- Tallahassee Tennis Challenger

Quentin Halys was the defending champion but chose not to defend his title.

Blaž Rola won the title after defeating Ramkumar Ramanathan 6–2, 6–7^{(6–8)}, 7–5 in the final.

== Seeds ==
1. (United States) Frances Tiafoe (withdrew)
2. (Barbados) Darian King (first round)
3. (Switzerland) Henri Laaksonen (second round)
4. (Argentina) Guido Andreozzi (quarterfinals, retired)
5. (Canada) Peter Polansky (first round)
6. (Argentina) Leonardo Mayer (second round)
7. (United States) Stefan Kozlov (quarterfinals)
8. (Argentina) Máximo González (first round)

== Draw ==
Key

- Q = Qualifier
- WC = Wild card
- LL = Lucky loser
- Alt = Alternate
- ITF = ITF entry
- PR = Protected ranking
- SR = Special ranking
- SE = Special exempt
- JE = Junior exempt
- JR = Junior Accelerator Programme entrant
- CO = College Accelerator Programme entrant
- NG = Next Gen Accelerator Program entrant
- w/o = Walkover
- r = Retired
- d = Defaulted

=== Finals ===
Semifinals
Q	(Italy) Andrea Arnaboldi	2	7	4
(India) Ramkumar Ramanathan	6	5	6
(United States) Mitchell Krueger	3	7	4
Q	(Slovenia) Blaž Rola	6	5	6

Final
(India) Ramkumar Ramanathan	2	7^{8}	5
Q	(Slovenia) Blaž Rola	6	6^{6}	7

=== Top half ===
First round
LL	(United States) S Bangoura	6	1	2
WC	(United States) C Harrison	3	6	6
(Dominican Republic) J Hernández-Fernández	3	6	3
Q	(Italy) A Arnaboldi	6	1	6
(Brazil) A Ghem	1	1
Q	(Germany) D Köpfer	6	6
WC	(United States) B Klahn	7^{10}	6^{5}	6
8	(Argentina) M González	6^{8}	7^{7}	4
4	(Argentina) G Andreozzi	6	6
LL	(Colombia) DE Galán	4	4
(Canada) D Shapovalov	5	6^{3}
(France) V Millot	7	7^{7}
(Republic of Ireland) J McGee	6	6
(Ecuador) R Quiroz	4	4
(India) R Ramanathan	6	7
5	(Canada) P Polansky	1	5

Second round
WC	(United States) C Harrison	4	3
Q	(Italy) A Arnaboldi	6	6
Q	(Germany) D Köpfer	5	1
WC	(United States) B Klahn	7	6
4	(Argentina) G Andreozzi	0	6	4
(France) V Millot	6	4	0^{r}
(Republic of Ireland) J McGee	6	3	2
(India) R Ramanathan	3	6	6

Quarterfinals
Q	(Italy) A Arnaboldi	6	7^{8}
WC	(United States) B Klahn	2	6^{6}
4	(Argentina) G Andreozzi	6	5	1^{r}
(India) R Ramanathan	4	7	1

Semifinals
Q	(Italy) A Arnaboldi	2	7	4
(India) R Ramanathan	6	5	6

=== Bottom half ===
First round
7	(United States) S Kozlov	6	4	6
(Argentina) F Coria	3	6	4
(Austria) J Melzer	7	6
PR	(Colombia) A González	5	2
(United States) M Krueger	3	7	6
(Australia) C O'Connell	6	5	2
(United States) T Sandgren	5	4
3	(Switzerland) H Laaksonen	7	6
6	(Argentina) L Mayer	6	6
Q	(New Zealand) J Statham	4	2
Q	(Slovenia) B Rola	6	6
WC	(United States) M Giron	2	4
(United States) D Novikov	6	6^{2}	6
(United States) M McDonald	3	7^{7}	3
(Australia) J-P Smith	6	6
2	(Barbados) D King	3	4

Second round
7	(United States) S Kozlov	2	6	6
(Austria) J Melzer	6	3	4
(United States) M Krueger	6	6
3	(Switzerland) H Laaksonen	3	2
6	(Argentina) L Mayer	2	4
Q	(Slovenia) B Rola	6	6
(United States) D Novikov	6	7
(Australia) J-P Smith	3	5

Quarterfinals
7	(United States) S Kozlov	4	5
(United States) M Krueger	6	7
Q	(Slovenia) B Rola	6	6
(United States) D Novikov	1	2

Semifinals
(United States) M Krueger	3	7	4
Q	(Slovenia) B Rola	6	5	6
