= 2024 Tallahassee Tennis Challenger =

- Date: 15–21 April
- Edition: 24th
- Surface: Green clay
- Location: Tallahassee, Florida, United States

Champions

Singles
- (Belgium) Zizou Bergs

Doubles
- (Sweden) Simon Freund / (Denmark) Johannes Ingildsen
← 2023 ·	Tallahassee Tennis Challenger	· 2025 →

The 2024 Tallahassee Tennis Challenger was a professional tennis tournament played on green clay courts. It was the 24th edition of the tournament which was part of the 2024 ATP Challenger Tour. It took place in Tallahassee, Florida, United States between April 15 and April 21, 2024.

== Singles main-draw entrants ==
=== Seeds ===
Country	Player	Rank^{1}	Seed
USA	J. J. Wolf	102	1
BEL	Zizou Bergs	109	2
USA	Patrick Kypson	144	3
USA	Denis Kudla	162	4
~~AUS~~	~~Marc Polmans~~	~~172~~	~~5~~
USA	Martin Damm	177	6
SUI	Alexander Ritschard	195	7
USA	Tristan Boyer	196	8

- ^{1} Rankings as of April 8, 2024.

=== Other entrants ===
The following players received wildcards into the singles main draw:

- (United States) Kaylan Bigun
- (United States) Stefan Kozlov
- (Portugal) Duarte Vale

The following players received entry from the qualifying draw:

- (Ecuador) Andrés Andrade
- Bogdan Bobrov
- (France) Corentin Denolly
- (United States) Bruno Kuzuhara
- (United States) Victor Lilov
- (Austria) Gerald Melzer

The following player received entry as a lucky loser:

- (United Kingdom) Kyle Edmund

== Champions ==
=== Singles ===
- (Belgium) Zizou Bergs def. (United States) Mitchell Krueger 6–4, 7–6^{(11–9)}.

=== Doubles ===
- (Sweden) Simon Freund / (Denmark) Johannes Ingildsen def. (United States) William Blumberg / (Venezuela) Luis David Martínez 7–5, 7–6^{(7–4)}.
