= 2017 Tallahassee Tennis Challenger =

- Date: 24 – 29 April
- Edition: 18th
- Draw: 32S / 16D
- Surface: Green clay
- Location: Tallahassee, Florida, United States

Champions

Singles
- (Slovenia) Blaž Rola

Doubles
- (United States) Scott Lipsky / (India) Leander Paes
- Tallahassee Tennis Challenger

The 2017 Tallahassee Tennis Challenger was a professional tennis tournament played on green clay courts. It was the 18th edition of the tournament to be part of the 2017 ATP Challenger Tour. It took place in Tallahassee, Florida, United States between April 24 and April 29, 2017. The men's singles final of the tournament was won by Blaz Rola of Slovenia, whilst the doubles title was won by Scott Lipsky and Leander Paes.

== Point distribution ==
Event	W	F	SF	QF	Round of 16	Round of 32	Q	Q2
Singles	80	48	29	15	7	0	3	0
Doubles	80	48	29	15	0	—N/a	—N/a	—N/a

== Singles main-draw entrants ==
=== Seeds ===
Country	Player	Rank^{1}	Seed
~~USA~~	~~Frances Tiafoe~~	~~87~~	~~1~~
BAR	Darian King	110	2
SUI	Henri Laaksonen	114	3
ARG	Guido Andreozzi	126	4
CAN	Peter Polansky	128	5
ARG	Leonardo Mayer	132	6
USA	Stefan Kozlov	137	7
ARG	Máximo González	153	8

- ^{1} Rankings as of April 17, 2017.

=== Other entrants ===
The following players received wildcards into the singles main draw:

- (United States) Marcos Giron
- (United States) Christian Harrison
- (United States) Bradley Klahn

The following player received entry into the singles main draw using a protected ranking:

- (Colombia) Alejandro González

The following players received entry from the qualifying draw:

- (Italy) Andrea Arnaboldi
- (Germany) Dominik Köpfer
- (Slovenia) Blaž Rola
- (New Zealand) Jose Statham

The following players received entry as lucky losers:

- (United States) Sekou Bangoura
- (Colombia) Daniel Elahi Galán

== Champions ==
=== Singles ===
- (Slovenia) Blaž Rola def. (India) Ramkumar Ramanathan 6–2, 6–7^{(6–8)}, 7–5.

=== Doubles ===
- (United States) Scott Lipsky / (India) Leander Paes def. (Argentina) Máximo González / (Argentina) Leonardo Mayer 4–6, 7–6^{(7–5)}, [10–7].
