= 2019 Tallahassee Tennis Challenger – Singles =

Singles
- 2019 Tallahassee Tennis Challenger

Final
- Champion: (Ecuador) Emilio Gómez
- Runner-up: (United States) Tommy Paul
- Score: 6–2, 6–2

Events
| Singles | Doubles |
- Tallahassee Tennis Challenger

Noah Rubin was the defending champion but lost in the quarterfinals to Tennys Sandgren.

Emilio Gómez won the title after defeating Tommy Paul 6–2, 6–2 in the final.

== Seeds ==
All seeds receive a bye into the second round.

1. (Italy) Paolo Lorenzi (second round)
2. (United States) Tennys Sandgren (semifinals)
3. (France) Corentin Moutet (semifinals)
4. (Canada) Peter Polansky (second round)
5. (United States) Noah Rubin (quarterfinals)
6. (Australia) Marc Polmans (third round)
7. (United States) Mitchell Krueger (third round)
8. (Colombia) Daniel Elahi Galán (withdrew)
9. (United States) Tommy Paul (final)
10. (Colombia) Santiago Giraldo (second round, retired)
11. (Germany) Mats Moraing (second round)
12. (Russia) Evgeny Karlovskiy (third round)
13. (Denmark) Mikael Torpegaard (quarterfinals)
14. (Brazil) Guilherme Clezar (second round)
15. (United States) JC Aragone (second round)
16. (Croatia) Nino Serdarušić (quarterfinals)

== Draw ==
Key

- Q = Qualifier
- WC = Wild card
- LL = Lucky loser
- Alt = Alternate
- ITF = ITF entry
- PR = Protected ranking
- SR = Special ranking
- SE = Special exempt
- JE = Junior exempt
- JR = Junior Accelerator Programme entrant
- CO = College Accelerator Programme entrant
- NG = Next Gen Accelerator Program entrant
- w/o = Walkover
- r = Retired
- d = Defaulted

=== Finals ===
Quarterfinals
16 | (Croatia) Nino Serdarušić | 7^{7} | 3 | 0
(Ecuador) Emilio Gómez | 6^{5} | 6 | 6
3 | (France) Corentin Moutet | 6 | 1 | 7
(India) Sumit Nagal | 2 | 6 | 5
9 | (United States) Tommy Paul | 6 | 6
13 | (Denmark) Mikael Torpegaard | 4 | 1
5 | (United States) Noah Rubin | 5 | 1
2 | (United States) Tennys Sandgren | 7 | 6

Semifinals
(Ecuador) Emilio Gómez | 6 | 6
3 | (France) Corentin Moutet | 1 | 4
9 | (United States) Tommy Paul | 6 | 6
2 | (United States) Tennys Sandgren | 4 | 3

Final
(Ecuador) Emilio Gómez | 6 | 6
9 | (United States) Tommy Paul | 2 | 2

=== Top half ===
==== Section 1 ====
First round
(Argentina) A Collarini | 6 | 3 | 6
WC | (United States) S Bangoura | 3 | 6 | 2
(United States) R Shane | 4 | 6^{4}
(United States) C Altamirano | 6 | 7^{7}
WC | (United States) D Novikov | 4 | 2
(Ecuador) E Gómez | 6 | 6
(Serbia) M Zekić | 4 | 2
WC | (United States) S Korda | 6 | 6

Second round
1 | (Italy) P Lorenzi | 2 | 7^{7} | 4
(Argentina) A Collarini | 6 | 6^{4} | 6
(United States) C Altamirano | 3 | 6 | 6^{5}
16 | (Croatia) N Serdarušić | 6 | 2 | 7^{7}
11 | (Germany) M Moraing | 5 | 1
(Ecuador) E Gómez | 7 | 6
WC | (United States) S Korda | 6^{3} | 7^{7} | 4
6 | (Australia) M Polmans | 7^{7} | 6^{3} | 6

Third round
(Argentina) A Collarini | 6 | 2 | 3
16 | (Croatia) N Serdarušić | 3 | 6 | 6
(Ecuador) E Gómez | 6 | 6
6 | (Australia) M Polmans | 4 | 2

Quarterfinals
16 | (Croatia) N Serdarušić | 7^{7} | 3 | 0
(Ecuador) E Gómez | 6^{5} | 6 | 6

==== Section 2 ====
First round
(Colombia) A González | 6 | 6
(France) V Millot | 2 | 3
ITF | (Chile) A Tabilo | 6 | 7^{8}
(Peru) JP Varillas | 1 | 6^{6}
(Kazakhstan) D Yevseyev | 0 | 6^{7}
(India) S Nagal | 6 | 7^{9}
WC | (United States) A Ritschard | 6 | 3 | 6
(Dominican Republic) R Cid Subervi | 4 | 6 | 4

Second round
3 | (France) C Moutet | 6 | 4
(Colombia) A González | 2 | 2^{r}
ITF | (Chile) A Tabilo | 6 | 6
15 | (United States) JC Aragone | 3 | 2
10 | (Colombia) S Giraldo | 2 | 3^{r}
(India) S Nagal | 6 | 4
WC | (United States) A Ritschard | 6 | 5 | 1
Q | (United States) Jordi Arconada | 4 | 7 | 6

Third round
3 | (France) C Moutet | 2 | 7 | 6
ITF | (Chile) A Tabilo | 6 | 5 | 2
(India) S Nagal | 7^{7} | 6
Q | (United States) J Arconada | 6^{4} | 1

Quarterfinals
3 | (France) C Moutet | 6 | 1 | 7
(India) S Nagal | 2 | 6 | 5

=== Bottom half ===
==== Section 3 ====
First round
LL | (Germany) J Härteis | 6 | 6
(United States) Evan Song | 4 | 4
(Uruguay) M Cuevas | 6 | 2
WC | (United States) Z Khan | 3 | 0^{r}
(France) A Müller | 7^{7} | 6
(United States) U Blanch | 6^{1} | 3
(Netherlands) J Sels | 1 | 2
(Argentina) F Coria | 6 | 6

Second round
7 | (United States) M Krueger | 3 | 6 | 6
LL | (Germany) J Härteis | 6 | 4 | 1
(Uruguay) M Cuevas | 1 | 4
9 | (United States) T Paul | 6 | 6
13 | (Denmark) M Torpegaard | 6 | 3 | 6
(France) A Müller | 2 | 6 | 4
(Argentina) F Coria | 6 | 6
4 | (Canada) P Polansky | 3 | 2

Third round
7 | (United States) M Krueger | 6 | 4 | 6^{2}
9 | (United States) T Paul | 2 | 6 | 7^{7}
13 | (Denmark) M Torpegaard | 6 | 5 | 6
(Argentina) F Coria | 3 | 7 | 3

Quarterfinals
9 | (United States) T Paul | 6 | 6
13 | (Denmark) M Torpegaard | 4 | 1

==== Section 4 ====
First round
Q | (Germany) B Hassan | 3 | 3
(United States) T-S Kwiatkowski | 6 | 6
(Chile) MT Barrios Vera | 7^{7} | 6
ITF | (France) A Rinderknech | 6^{3} | 3
ITF | (Russia) A Karatsev | 6^{5} | 6 | 3
ITF | (Switzerland) S Ehrat | 7^{7} | 2 | 6
(United States) S Kozlov | 4 | 6 | 6
ITF | (Russia) A Zhurbin | 6 | 4 | 0

Second round
5 | (United States) N Rubin | 6 | 6
(United States) T-S Kwiatkowski | 1 | 2
(Chile) MT Barrios Vera | 3 | 6 | 3
12 | (Russia) E Karlovskiy | 6 | 1 | 6
14 | (Brazil) G Clezar | 7^{9} | 5 | 2
ITF | (Switzerland) S Ehrat | 6^{7} | 7 | 6
(United States) S Kozlov | 3 | 2
2 | (United States) T Sandgren | 6 | 6

Third round
5 | (United States) N Rubin | 3 | 6 | 7
12 | (Russia) E Karlovskiy | 6 | 4 | 5
ITF | (Switzerland) S Ehrat | 3 | 7^{7} | 4
2 | (United States) T Sandgren | 6 | 6^{5} | 6

Quarterfinals
5 | (United States) N Rubin | 5 | 1
2 | (United States) T Sandgren | 7 | 6
