= 2023 Tallahassee Tennis Challenger – Doubles =

Doubles
- 2023 Tallahassee Tennis Challenger

Final
- Champions: (Argentina) Federico Agustín Gómez (Argentina) Nicolás Kicker
- Runners-up: (United States) William Blumberg (Venezuela) Luis David Martínez
- Score: 7–6^{(7–2)}, 4–6, [13–11]

Events
| Singles | Doubles |
- Tallahassee Tennis Challenger

Gijs Brouwer and Christian Harrison were the defending champions but only Harrison chose to defend his title, partnering Alex Rybakov. Harrison lost in the quarterfinals to William Blumberg and Luis David Martínez.

Federico Agustín Gómez and Nicolás Kicker won the title after defeating Blumberg and Martínez 7–6^{(7–2)}, 4–6, [13–11] in the final.

== Seeds ==
1. (United States) William Blumberg / (Venezuela) Luis David Martínez (final)
2. (United States) Evan King / (United States) Mitchell Krueger (semifinals)
3. (Austria) David Pichler / (Germany) Tim Sandkaulen (first round)
4. (Argentina) Facundo Díaz Acosta / (Argentina) Camilo Ugo Carabelli (withdrew)

== Draw ==
Key

- Q = Qualifier
- WC = Wild card
- LL = Lucky loser
- Alt = Alternate
- ITF = ITF entry
- PR = Protected ranking
- SR = Special ranking
- SE = Special exempt
- JE = Junior exempt
- JR = Junior Accelerator Programme entrant
- CO = College Accelerator Programme entrant
- NG = Next Gen Accelerator Program entrant
- w/o = Walkover
- r = Retired
- d = Defaulted

First round
1 | (United States) W Blumberg (Venezuela) LD Martínez | 6 | 7
(United States) N Chappell (Northern Mariana Islands) C Sinclair | 2 | 5
(United States) Jack Vance (United States) Jamie Vance | 2 | 6^{5}
(United States) C Harrison (United States) A Rybakov | 6 | 7^{7}
3 | (Austria) D Pichler (Germany) T Sandkaulen | 4 | 7^{8} | [7]
WC | (United States) M Damm (United States) V Kirkov | 6 | 6^{6} | [10]
(France) E Couacaud (France) L Pouille | 7^{7} | 6
(United States) M Kiger (Canada) B Sigouin | 6^{5} | 2
(Israel) R Stepanov (United States) Tennyson Whiting | 3 | 6^{4}
(United States) Colin Markes (United States) Tristan McCormick | 6 | 7^{7}
(Italy) A Arnaboldi (France) C Hemery | 6 | 3 | [9]
Alt | (Argentina) FA Gómez (Argentina) N Kicker | 1 | 6 | [11]
(Tunisia) M Echargui (Japan) R Noguchi | 4 | 6 | [7]
WC | (United States) A Michelsen (United States) C Williams | 6 | 1 | [10]
(France) K Jacquet (France) M Martineau | 5 | 2
2 | (United States) E King (United States) M Krueger | 7 | 6

Quarterfinals
1 | (United States) W Blumberg (Venezuela) LD Martínez | 6 | 6
(United States) C Harrison (United States) A Rybakov | 3 | 3
WC | (United States) M Damm (United States) V Kirkov | 2 | 6 | [10]
(France) E Couacaud (France) L Pouille | 6 | 2 | [12]
(United States) C Markes (United States) T McCormick | 2 | 5
Alt | (Argentina) FA Gómez (Argentina) N Kicker | 6 | 7
WC | (United States) A Michelsen (United States) C Williams | 6 | 3 | [5]
2 | (United States) E King (United States) M Krueger | 2 | 6 | [10]

Semifinals
1 | (United States) W Blumberg (Venezuela) LD Martínez | 6 | 6^{7} | [10]
(France) E Couacaud (France) L Pouille | 2 | 7^{9} | [8]
Alt | (Argentina) FA Gómez (Argentina) N Kicker | 4 | 6 | [10]
2 | (United States) E King (United States) M Krueger | 6 | 4 | [8]

Final
1 | (United States) W Blumberg (Venezuela) LD Martínez | 6^{2} | 6 | [11]
Alt | (Argentina) FA Gómez (Argentina) N Kicker | 7^{7} | 4 | [13]
