= 2019 Tallahassee Tennis Challenger =

Professional tennis tournament in USA

- Date: 22–28 April
- Edition: 20th
- Draw: 48S / 16D
- Surface: Green clay
- Location: Tallahassee, Florida, United States

Champions

Singles
- (Ecuador) Emilio Gómez

Doubles
- (Venezuela) Roberto Maytín / (Brazil) Fernando Romboli
- Tallahassee Tennis Challenger

The 2019 Tallahassee Tennis Challenger was a professional tennis tournament played on green clay courts. It was the 20th edition of the tournament and was part of the 2019 ATP Challenger Tour. It took place in Tallahassee, Florida, United States between April 22 and April 28, 2019.

== Singles main-draw entrants ==
=== Seeds ===
Country	Player	Rank^{1}	Seed
ITA	Paolo Lorenzi	110	1
USA	Tennys Sandgren	111	2
FRA	Corentin Moutet	126	3
CAN	Peter Polansky	128	4
USA	Noah Rubin	145	5
AUS	Marc Polmans	163	6
USA	Mitchell Krueger	175	7
~~COL~~	~~Daniel Elahi Galán~~	~~201~~	~~8~~
USA	Tommy Paul	204	9
COL	Santiago Giraldo	206	10
GER	Mats Moraing	209	11
RUS	Evgeny Karlovskiy	224	12
DEN	Mikael Torpegaard	230	13
BRA	Guilherme Clezar	244	14
USA	JC Aragone	247	15
CRO	Nino Serdarušić	248	16

- ^{1} Rankings as of April 15, 2019.

=== Other entrants ===
The following players received wildcards into the singles main draw:

- (United States) Sekou Bangoura
- (United States) Zane Khan
- (United States) Sebastian Korda
- (United States) Dennis Novikov
- (United States) Alexander Ritschard

The following players received entry into the singles main draw using their ITF World Tennis Ranking:

- (Switzerland) Sandro Ehrat
- (Russia) Aslan Karatsev
- (France) Arthur Rinderknech
- (Chile) Alejandro Tabilo
- (Russia) Alexander Zhurbin

The following players received entry from the qualifying draw:

- (United States) Jordi Arconada
- (Germany) Benjamin Hassan

The following player received entry as a lucky loser:

- (Germany) Johannes Härteis

== Champions ==
=== Singles ===
- (Ecuador) Emilio Gómez def. (United States) Tommy Paul 6–2, 6–2.

=== Doubles ===
- (Venezuela) Roberto Maytín / (Brazil) Fernando Romboli def. (United States) Thai-Son Kwiatkowski / (United States) Noah Rubin 6–2, 4–6, [10–7].
