= 2010 Tallahassee Tennis Challenger =

- Date: April 17 – April 24
- Edition: 2nd
- Location: Tallahassee, United States

Champions

Singles
- (Argentina) Brian Dabul

Doubles
- (Australia) Stephen Huss / (Australia) Joseph Sirianni
- Tallahassee Tennis Challenger

The 2010 Tallahassee Tennis Challenger was a professional tennis tournament played on outdoor hard courts. It was part of the 2010 ATP Challenger Tour. It took place in Tallahassee, United States between April 17 and April 24, 2010.

== ATP entrants ==
=== Seeds ===
Nationality	Player	Ranking*	Seeding
USA	Rajeev Ram	92	1
RSA	Kevin Anderson	103	2
USA	Taylor Dent	106	3
USA	Robby Ginepri	107	4
USA	Jesse Levine	108	5
AUS	Carsten Ball	120	6
USA	Kevin Kim	133	7
USA	Ryan Sweeting	142	8

- Rankings are as of April 12, 2010.

=== Other entrants ===
The following players received wildcards into the singles main draw:

- (United States) Jean-Yves Aubone
- (United States) Brendan Evans
- (United States) Bobby Reynolds
- (United States) Tim Smyczek

The following players received Special Exempt into the singles main draw:

- (Mexico) Santiago González
- (Japan) Go Soeda

The following players received entry from the qualifying draw:

- (United Kingdom) Jamie Baker
- (United Kingdom) Joshua Goodall
- (Slovenia) Luka Gregorc
- (Australia) Dayne Kelly

== Champions ==
=== Singles ===
(Argentina) Brian Dabul def. (United States) Robby Ginepri, 4–6, 4–0, Ret.

=== Doubles ===
(Australia) Stephen Huss / (Australia) Joseph Sirianni def. (United States) Robert Kendrick / (United States) Bobby Reynolds, 6–2, 6–4
