= 2022 Tallahassee Tennis Challenger =

- Date: 18–24 April
- Edition: 22nd
- Surface: Green clay
- Location: Tallahassee, Florida, United States

Champions

Singles
- (Chinese Taipei) Wu Tung-lin

Doubles
- (Netherlands) Gijs Brouwer / (United States) Christian Harrison
- Tallahassee Tennis Challenger

The 2022 Tallahassee Tennis Challenger was a professional tennis tournament played on green clay courts. It was the 22nd edition of the tournament which was part of the 2022 ATP Challenger Tour. It took place in Tallahassee, Florida, United States between April 18 and April 24, 2022.

== Singles main-draw entrants ==
=== Seeds ===
Country	Player	Rank^{1}	Seed
ARG	Tomás Martín Etcheverry	95	1
USA	Steve Johnson	107	2
COL	Daniel Elahi Galán	128	3
ECU	Emilio Gómez	131	4
CHI	Tomás Barrios Vera	144	5
USA	J. J. Wolf	151	6
USA	Mitchell Krueger	153	7
USA	Tennys Sandgren	165	8

- ^{1} Rankings as of April 11, 2022.

=== Other entrants ===
The following players received wildcards into the singles main draw:

- (France) Antoine Cornut-Chauvinc
- (United States) Aleksandar Kovacevic
- (United States) Alex Rybakov

The following players received entry from the qualifying draw:

- (Netherlands) Gijs Brouwer
- (Brazil) Daniel Dutra da Silva
- (France) Arthur Fils
- (United States) Christian Langmo
- (Sweden) Jonathan Mridha
- (Denmark) Mikael Torpegaard

== Champions ==
=== Singles ===
- (Chinese Taipei) Wu Tung-lin def. (United States) Michael Mmoh 6–3, 6–4.

=== Doubles ===
- (Netherlands) Gijs Brouwer / (United States) Christian Harrison def. (Ecuador) Diego Hidalgo / (Colombia) Cristian Rodríguez 4–6, 7–5, [10–6].
