= Sebastian Bader =

Austrian tennis player (born 1988)

- Country (sports): Austria
- Born: 22 January 1988 (age 37) Austria
- Plays: Right Handed (Double Handed Backhand)
- Prize money: $21,018

Singles
- Highest ranking: No. 1,498 (20 February 2012)

Doubles
- Career record: 5–10
- Career titles: 1
- Highest ranking: No. 207 (16 June 2014)

Sebastian Bader (born 22 January 1988) is an Austrian tennis player playing on the ATP Challenger Tour. On 18 November 2013, he reached his highest ATP doubles ranking of No. 255 and a singles ranking of No. 1,498 achieved on 20 February 2012.

== Tour titles ==
Legend
Grand Slam (0)
ATP Masters Series (0)
ATP Tour (0)
Challengers (1)

=== Doubles ===
Outcome	No.	Date	Tournament	Surface	Partner	Opponents	Score
Winner	1.	3 May 2014	Tallahassee	Clay	(Australia) Ryan Agar	(United States) Bjorn Fratangelo (United States) Mitchell Krueger	6–3, 7–6^{7–3}
