= Ryan Agar =

Australian tennis player

- Country (sports): Australia
- Born: 21 June 1987 (age 37); Brisbane, Australia
- Plays: Right Handed (Double Handed Backhand)
- Prize money: $32,126

Singles
- Career record: 1–8
- Career titles: 0
- Highest ranking: No. 647 (21 July 2014)
- Current ranking: No. 674

Doubles
- Career record: 9–10
- Career titles: 0
- Highest ranking: No. 205 (5 May 2014)
- Current ranking: No. 452
- Last updated on: 14:25, 30 January 2015 (UTC).

Ryan Agar (born 21 June 1987) is an Australian tennis player playing on the ATP Challenger Tour. On 21 July 2014, he reached his highest ATP singles ranking of 647 and his highest doubles ranking of 205 achieved on 5 May 2014.

== Tour titles ==
Legend
Grand Slam (0)
ATP Masters Series (0)
ATP Tour (0)
Challengers (2)

=== Doubles ===
Outcome	No.	Date	Tournament	Surface	Partner	Opponents	Score
Winner	1.	3 November 2013	Traralgon	Hard	(Australia) Adam Feeney	(Australia) Dane Propoggia (New Zealand) Jose Rubin Statham	6–3, 6–4
Winner	2.	3 May 2014	Tallahassee	Clay	(Austria) Sebastian Bader	(United States) Bjorn Fratangelo (United States) Mitchell Krueger	6–3, 7–6^{7–3}
