= Tallahassee Tennis Challenger =

- 2025 Tallahassee Tennis Challenger

Tournament information
- Event name: Tallahassee Tennis Challenger
- Location: Tallahassee, Florida, United States
- Venue: Forestmeadows Tennis Complex
- Category: ATP Challenger Tour
- Surface: Clay (green)
- Draw: 32S/32Q/16D/4Q
- Prize money: $100,000
- Website: Website

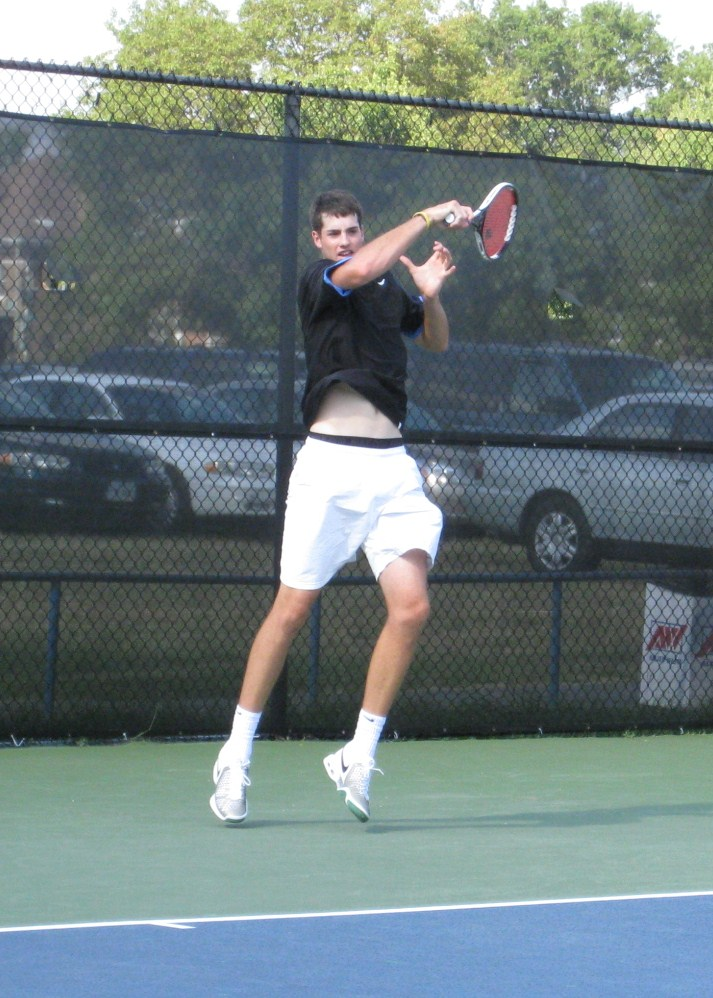
6-feet 8½-inches tall American John Isner took the singles titles in 2009

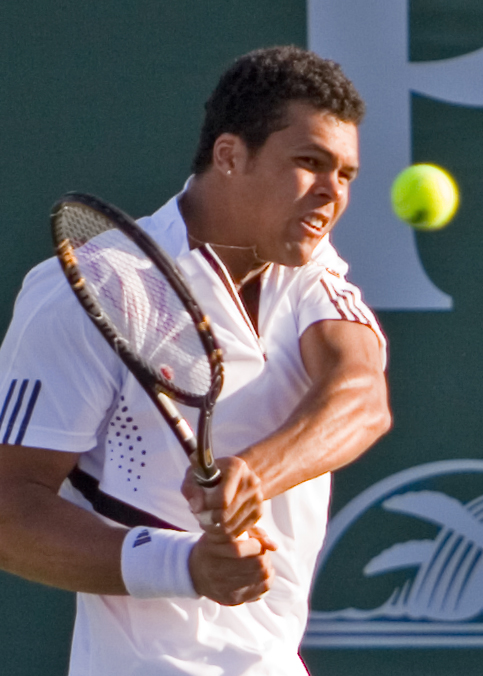
Eventual 2008 Australian Open runner-up Jo-Wilfried Tsonga from France won the 2007 singles over Rik de Voest

The Tallahassee Tennis Challenger is a professional tennis tournament played on green clay courts. It is currently part of the ATP Challenger Tour. It is held annually at the Forestmeadows Tennis Complex in Tallahassee, Florida in the United States, since 2000. Since 2013, it has been played outdoors on clay. It is part of the USTA Pro Circuit Wild Card Challenge, which decides which American player gets an invitation to play in the French Open.

== Past finals ==
=== Singles ===
Year	Champion	Runner-up	Score
2026	(France) Clément Tabur	(Brazil) João Lucas Reis da Silva	6–4, 1–0 ret.
2025	(Luxembourg) Chris Rodesch	(United States) Emilio Nava	4–6, 6–3, 6–4
2024	(Belgium) Zizou Bergs	(United States) Mitchell Krueger	6–4, 7–6^{(11–9)}
2023	(Belgium) Zizou Bergs	(Chinese Taipei) Wu Tung-lin	7–5, 6–2
2022	(Chinese Taipei) Wu Tung-lin	(United States) Michael Mmoh	6–3, 6–4
2021	(United States) Jenson Brooksby	(United States) Bjorn Fratangelo	6–3, 4–6, 6–3
2020	Not Held		
2019	(Ecuador) Emilio Gómez	(United States) Tommy Paul	6–2, 6–2
2018	(United States) Noah Rubin	(Australia) Marc Polmans	6–2, 3–6, 6–4
2017	(Slovenia) Blaž Rola	(India) Ramkumar Ramanathan	6–2, 6–7^{(6–8)}, 7–5
2016	(France) Quentin Halys	(United States) Frances Tiafoe	6–7^{(6–8)}, 6–4, 6–2
2015	(Argentina) Facundo Argüello	(United States) Frances Tiafoe	2–6, 7–6^{(7–5)}, 6–4
2014	(United States) Robby Ginepri	(Canada) Frank Dancevic	6–3, 6–4
2013	(United States) Denis Kudla	(Germany) Cedrik-Marcel Stebe	6–3, 6–3
2012	(United States) Tim Smyczek	(Canada) Frank Dancevic	7–5, ret.
2011	(United States) Donald Young	(United States) Wayne Odesnik	6–4, 3–6, 6–3
2010	(Argentina) Brian Dabul	(United States) Robby Ginepri	4–6, 4–0, ret.
2009	(United States) John Isner	(United States) Donald Young	7–5, 6–4
2008	(United States) Bobby Reynolds	(United States) Robert Kendrick	5–7, 6–4, 6–3
2007	(France) Jo-Wilfried Tsonga	(South Africa) Rik de Voest	6–1, 6–4
2006	(United States) Mardy Fish	(United States) Zack Fleishman	7–5, 7–6^{(8–6)}
2005	(United States) Brian Vahaly (2)	(United States) Justin Gimelstob	6–4, 6–0
2004	(United States) Cecil Mamiit	(Sweden) Björn Rehnquist	6–4, 4–6, 7–5
2003	(United States) Paul Goldstein	(United States) Alex Kim	2–6, 6–2, 4–0 retired
2002	(United States) Brian Vahaly (1)	(United States) Justin Gimelstob	7–6^{(7–5)}, 6–4
2001	(Paraguay) Ramón Delgado	(United States) Justin Gimelstob	7–5, 6–3
2000	(United States) Jeff Salzenstein	(United States) Kevin Kim	6–3, 6–2

=== Doubles ===
Year	Champions	Runners-up	Score
2026	(United States) Stefan Dostanic (United States) Alex Rybakov	(Canada) Cleeve Harper (United Kingdom) David Stevenson	6–4, 6–2
2025	(Canada) Liam Draxl (Canada) Cleeve Harper	(United States) James Cerretani (United States) George Goldhoff	6–2, 6–3
2024	(Sweden) Simon Freund (Denmark) Johannes Ingildsen	(United States) William Blumberg (Venezuela) Luis David Martínez	7–5, 7–6^{(7–4)}
2023	(Argentina) Federico Agustín Gómez (Argentina) Nicolás Kicker	(United States) William Blumberg (Venezuela) Luis David Martínez	7–6^{(7–2)}, 4–6, [13–11]
2022	(Netherlands) Gijs Brouwer (United States) Christian Harrison	(Ecuador) Diego Hidalgo (Colombia) Cristian Rodríguez	4–6, 7–5, [10–6]
2021	(Brazil) Orlando Luz (Brazil) Rafael Matos	(United States) Sekou Bangoura (United States) Donald Young	7–6^{(7–2)}, 6–2
2020	Not Held		
2019	(Venezuela) Roberto Maytín (Brazil) Fernando Romboli	(United States) Thai-Son Kwiatkowski (United States) Noah Rubin	6–2, 4–6, [10–7]
2018	(United States) Robert Galloway (United States) Denis Kudla	(Spain) Enrique López Pérez (India) Jeevan Nedunchezhiyan	6–3, 6–1
2017	(United States) Scott Lipsky (India) Leander Paes	(Argentina) Máximo González (Argentina) Leonardo Mayer	4–6, 7–6^{(7–5)}, [10–7]
2016	(United States) Dennis Novikov (2) (Chile) Julio Peralta (1)	(Australia) Peter Luczak (Australia) Marc Polmans	3–6, 6–4, [12–10]
2015	(United States) Dennis Novikov (1) (Chile) Julio Peralta (1)	(India) Somdev Devvarman (India) Sanam Singh	6–2, 6–4
2014	(Australia) Ryan Agar (Austria) Sebastian Bader	(United States) Bjorn Fratangelo (United States) Mitchell Krueger	6–4, 7–6^{(7–3)}
2013	(United States) Austin Krajicek (United States) Tennys Sandgren	(Australia) Greg Jones (Canada) Peter Polansky	1–6, 6–2, [10–8]
2012	(Germany) Martin Emmrich (Sweden) Andreas Siljeström	(New Zealand) Artem Sitak (United States) Blake Strode	6–2, 7–6^{(7–4)}
2011	(Canada) Vasek Pospisil (United States) Bobby Reynolds (2)	(Japan) Go Soeda (United Kingdom) James Ward	6–2, 6–4
2010	(Australia) Stephen Huss (Australia) Joseph Sirianni	(United States) Robert Kendrick (United States) Bobby Reynolds	6–2, 6–4
2009	(United States) Eric Butorac (United States) Scott Lipsky	(United Kingdom) Colin Fleming (United Kingdom) Ken Skupski	6–1, 6–4
2008	(United States) Rajeev Ram (United States) Bobby Reynolds (1)	(United States) Robert Kendrick (United States) Ryan Sweeting	walkover
2007	(South Africa) Izak van der Merwe (South Africa) Wesley Whitehouse	(United States) John-Paul Fruttero (United States) Mirko Pehar	6–3, 6–4
2006	(South Africa) Rik de Voest (United States) Glenn Weiner	(United States) Tripp Phillips (United States) Bobby Reynolds	3–6, 6–3, 10–0
2005	(Sweden) Robert Lindstedt (Austria) Alexander Peya	(United States) Goran Dragicevic (United States) Mirko Pehar	6–2, 7–5
2004	(United States) Matías Boeker (Israel) Noam Okun	(Australia) Mark Hlawaty (Australia) Brad Weston	6–7^{(3–7)}, 6–3, 6–4
2003	Play Stopped At The Quarterfinals Stage		
2002	(United States) Levar Harper-Griffith (United States) Jeff Williams	(United States) Huntley Montgomery (United States) Brian Vahaly	6–3, 4–6, 6–4
2001	(Australia) Matthew Breen (Australia) Lee Pearson	(United States) Brandon Hawk (United States) Robert Kendrick	6–4, 6–2
2000	(The Bahamas) Mark Knowles (The Bahamas) Mark Merklein	(United States) Kelly Gullett (United States) Brandon Hawk	7–6^{(7–3)}, 6–2
