= 2010 Aegon Trophy – Men's doubles =

Men's doubles
- 2010 Aegon Trophy

Final
- Champions: (United Kingdom) Colin Fleming (United Kingdom) Ken Skupski
- Runners-up: (United States) Eric Butorac (United States) Scott Lipsky
- Score: 7–6^{(7–3)}, 6–4

Events
Singles	men	women
Doubles	men	women
← 2009 ·	Aegon Trophy	· 2011 →

Eric Butorac and Scott Lipsky were the defending champions; however, Colin Fleming and Ken Skupski defeated them 7–6^{(7–3)}, 6–4 in the final.

== Seeds ==
1. (United Kingdom) Colin Fleming / (United Kingdom) Ken Skupski (champions)
2. (United States) Eric Butorac / (United States) Scott Lipsky (final)
3. (Ukraine) Sergei Bubka / (Russia) Dmitry Tursunov (first round)
4. (United Kingdom) Jamie Delgado / (United Kingdom) Joshua Goodall (semifinals)

== Draw ==
=== Key ===
- Q = Qualifier
- WC = Wild card
- LL = Lucky loser
- Alt = Alternate
- SE = Special exempt
- PR = Protected ranking
- ITF = ITF entry
- JE = Junior exempt
- w/o = Walkover
- r = Retired
- d = Defaulted
- SR = Special ranking

=== Draw ===
First round
1	(United Kingdom) C Fleming (United Kingdom) K Skupski	3	6	[12]
(Japan) G Soeda (Japan) Y Sugita	6	1	[10]
(South Africa) K Anderson (Spain) I Navarro	7	6^{6}	[10]
(Spain) A Brugués-Davi (Australia) K Hensel	6^{6}	7	[7]
4	(United Kingdom) J Delgado (United Kingdom) J Goodall
(France) A Clément (France) A Mannarino	w/o
WC	(United Kingdom) A Bogdanovic (United Kingdom) A Slabinsky	6^{4}	3
(Lithuania) R Berankis (Latvia) A Juška	7	6
(Bulgaria) G Dimitrov (United Kingdom) J Marray	6	7
(Serbia) I Bozoljac (Luxembourg) G Müller	4	6^{3}
WC	(United Kingdom) C Eaton (United Kingdom) D Inglot	6	6
3	(Ukraine) S Bubka (Russia) D Tursunov	3	3
(Germany) A Begemann (Australia) M Ebden
(India) P Amritraj (United States) B Evans	w/o
WC	(United Kingdom) J Milton (United Kingdom) A Ward	5	3
2	(United States) E Butorac (United States) S Lipsky	7	6

Quarterfinals
1	(United Kingdom) C Fleming (United Kingdom) K Skupski	6	6
(South Africa) K Anderson (Spain) I Navarro	4	4
4	(United Kingdom) J Delgado (United Kingdom) J Goodall	6	6
(Lithuania) R Berankis (Latvia) A Juška	3	4
(Bulgaria) G Dimitrov (United Kingdom) J Marray	7	3	[5]
WC	(United Kingdom) C Eaton (United Kingdom) D Inglot	6^{9}	6	[10]
(Germany) A Begemann (Australia) M Ebden	4	0
2	(United States) E Butorac (United States) S Lipsky	6	6

Semifinals
1	(United Kingdom) C Fleming (United Kingdom) K Skupski	6	6
4	(United Kingdom) J Delgado (United Kingdom) J Goodall	3	3
WC	(United Kingdom) C Eaton (United Kingdom) D Inglot	4	6^{3}
2	(United States) E Butorac (United States) S Lipsky	6	7

Finals
1	(United Kingdom) C Fleming (United Kingdom) K Skupski	7	6
2	(United States) E Butorac (United States) S Lipsky	6^{3}	4
