= 2008 Nottingham Open =

- Date: 16–21 June 2008
- Edition: 19th
- Category: International Series
- Draw: 32S / 16D
- Prize money: €349,000
- Surface: Grass / outdoor Hard / indoor (Finals only)
- Location: Nottingham, United Kingdom
- Venue: Nottingham Tennis Centre

Champions

Singles
- (Croatia) Ivo Karlović

Doubles
- (Brazil) Bruno Soares / (Zimbabwe) Kevin Ullyett
- Nottingham Open

The 2008 Nottingham Open (also known as the Slazenger Open for sponsorship reasons) was a men's tennis tournament played on outdoor grass courts. It was the 19th edition of the Nottingham Open, and was part of the International Series of the 2008 ATP Tour. It took place at the Nottingham Tennis Centre in Nottingham, England, United Kingdom, from 16 June through 21 June 2008.

The singles field was led by ATP No. 16, Rome Masters semifinalist and San Jose finalist Radek Štěpánek, Munich semifinalist Paul-Henri Mathieu, and Hamburg Masters quarterfinalist Fernando Verdasco. Among other players competing were Queen's Club quarterfinalist and Nottingham defending champion Ivo Karlović, Casablanca titlist Gilles Simon, Dmitry Tursunov, Andreas Seppi and Gaël Monfils.

Fourth-seeded Ivo Karlović successfully defended his 2007 singles title. The final was contested on indoor hard (not grass) due to rain.

== Tursunov's expulsion ==
Russian sixth seed Dmitry Tursunov was expelled from the tournament by the ATP after he stormed off the court in his doubles' first round match, dismayed at a decision from the line judge, as Simone Bolelli and Andreas Seppi led him and partner Chris Haggard 6–4, 3–1. While Tursunov was expected to receive a fine, the ATP decided to deliver a more severe punishment, withdrawing him from the singles event. His scheduled second round opponent, Thomas Johansson, was given a walkover into the quarterfinals.

== Finals ==
=== Singles ===
(Croatia) Ivo Karlović defeated (Spain) Fernando Verdasco, 7–5, 6–7^{(4–7)}, 7–6^{(10–8)}

- It was Ivo Karlović's 1st title of the year, and his 4th overall. It was his 2nd consecutive win at the event.

=== Doubles ===
(Brazil) Bruno Soares / (Zimbabwe) Kevin Ullyett defeated (South Africa) Jeff Coetzee / (United Kingdom) Jamie Murray, 6–2, 7–6^{(7–5)}
