= 2009 Aegon Trophy =

- Date: June 1 – June 7
- Edition: 1st
- Location: Nottingham, Great Britain

Champions

Men's singles
- (United States) Brendan Evans

Women's singles
- (Italy) Maria Elena Camerin

Men's doubles
- (United States) Eric Butorac / (United States) Scott Lipsky

Women's doubles
- (United States) Alexa Glatch / (South Africa) Natalie Grandin
Aegon Trophy	· 2010 →

The 2009 Aegon Trophy was a professional tennis tournament played on outdoor grass courts. It was part of the 2009 ATP Challenger Tour. It took place in Nottingham, Great Britain between 1 and 7 June 2009.

== ATP entrants ==
=== Seeds ===
Nationality	Player	Ranking*	Seeding
LUX	Gilles Müller	79	1
USA	Robert Kendrick	86	2
CAN	Frank Dancevic	108	3
FRA	Adrian Mannarino	126	4
SRB	Ilija Bozoljac	131	5
IND	Somdev Devvarman	135	6
AUS	Chris Guccione	137	7
USA	Jesse Levine	140	8

- Rankings are as of May 25, 2009.

=== Other entrants ===
The following players received wildcards into the singles main draw:

- (United Kingdom) Daniel Cox
- (United Kingdom) Chris Eaton
- (United Kingdom) Daniel Evans
- (United Kingdom) Colin Fleming

The following players received entry from the qualifying draw:

- (India) Rohan Bopanna
- (Bulgaria) Grigor Dimitrov (as a Lucky loser)
- (United Kingdom) Joshua Goodall
- (Australia) Samuel Groth
- (Japan) Tatsuma Ito

== Champions ==
=== Singles ===
(United States) Brendan Evans def. (Serbia) Ilija Bozoljac, 6–7(4), 6–4, 7–6(4)

=== Doubles ===
(United States) Eric Butorac / (United States) Scott Lipsky def. (United Kingdom) Colin Fleming / (United Kingdom) Ken Skupski, 6–4, 6–4
