= 2009 Aegon Trophy – Men's doubles =

Tennis players Butorac and Lipsky win

Men's doubles
- 2009 Aegon Trophy

Final
- Champions: (United States) Eric Butorac (United States) Scott Lipsky
- Runners-up: (United Kingdom) Colin Fleming (United Kingdom) Ken Skupski
- Score: 6–4, 6–4

Events
Singles	men	women
Doubles	men	women
Aegon Trophy	· 2010 →

Eric Butorac and Scott Lipsky defeated Colin Fleming and Ken Skupski in the final (6–4, 6–4).

== Seeds ==
1. (South Africa) Jeff Coetzee / (Australia) Jordan Kerr (quarterfinals)
2. (Australia) Stephen Huss / (United Kingdom) Ross Hutchins (first round)
3. (United States) Eric Butorac / (United States) Scott Lipsky (champions)
4. (Pakistan) Aisam-ul-Haq Qureshi / (Croatia) Lovro Zovko (first round)

== Draw ==
=== Key ===
- Q = Qualifier
- WC = Wild card
- LL = Lucky loser
- Alt = Alternate
- SE = Special exempt
- PR = Protected ranking
- ITF = ITF entry
- JE = Junior exempt
- w/o = Walkover
- r = Retired
- d = Defaulted
- SR = Special ranking

=== Draw ===
First round
1	(South Africa) J Coetzee (Australia) J Kerr	6	6
(France) O Charroin (United States) B Evans	4	3
(Luxembourg) G Müller (United Kingdom) J Murray	7	6
(United States) R Kendrick (United States) J Levine	6^{6}	4
4	(Pakistan) A-u-H Qureshi (Croatia) L Zovko	6	4	[5]
(United Kingdom) J Auckland (United Kingdom) J Goodall	4	6	[10]
(India) P Amritraj (United States) R Ram	3	7	[7]
(United Kingdom) C Fleming (United Kingdom) K Skupski	6	6^{2}	[10]
(India) R Bopanna (United States) J Thomas	6	7
WC	(United Kingdom) A Bogdanovic (United Kingdom) D Cox	4	6^{5}
WC	(United Kingdom) C Eaton (United Kingdom) A Slabinsky	3	4
3	(United States) E Butorac (United States) S Lipsky	6	6
Q	(Australia) B Klein (Australia) M Matosevic	6	4	[7]
WC	(United Kingdom) J Delgado (United Kingdom) J Marray	4	6	[10]
(Ukraine) S Bubka (Russia) A Kudryavtsev	6	2	[10]
2	(Australia) S Huss (United Kingdom) R Hutchins	3	6	[8]

Quarterfinals
1	(South Africa) J Coetzee (Australia) J Kerr	6	6^{4}	[8]
(Luxembourg) G Müller (United Kingdom) J Murray	3	7	[10]
(United Kingdom) J Auckland (United Kingdom) J Goodall	6	6^{4}	[7]
(United Kingdom) C Fleming (United Kingdom) K Skupski	4	7	[10]
(India) R Bopanna (United States) J Thomas	w/o
3	(United States) E Butorac (United States) S Lipsky
WC	(United Kingdom) J Delgado (United Kingdom) J Marray	6	6
(Ukraine) S Bubka (Russia) A Kudryavtsev	3	1

Semifinals
(Luxembourg) G Müller (United Kingdom) J Murray	6^{5}	3
(United Kingdom) C Fleming (United Kingdom) K Skupski	7	6
3	(United States) E Butorac (United States) S Lipsky	6	6
WC	(United Kingdom) J Delgado (United Kingdom) J Marray	3	4

Finals
(United Kingdom) C Fleming (United Kingdom) K Skupski	4	4
3	(United States) E Butorac (United States) S Lipsky	6	6
