= 2009 Aegon Trophy – Men's singles =

Men's singles
- 2009 Aegon Trophy

Final
- Champion: (United States) Brendan Evans
- Runner-up: (Serbia) Ilija Bozoljac
- Score: 6–7^{(4–7)}, 6–4, 7–6^{(7–4)}

Events
Singles	men	women
Doubles	men	women
Aegon Trophy	· 2010 →

Brendan Evans won in the final 6–7^{(4–7)}, 6–4, 7–6^{(7–4)}, against Ilija Bozoljac.

== Seeds ==
1. (Luxembourg) Gilles Müller (first round)
2. (United States) Robert Kendrick (quarterfinals)
3. (Canada) Frank Dancevic (first round)
4. (France) Adrian Mannarino (quarterfinals)
5. (Serbia) Ilija Bozoljac (final)
6. (India) Somdev Devvarman (first round)
7. (Australia) Chris Guccione (second round)
8. (United States) Jesse Levine (first round)

== Draw ==
=== Key ===
- Q = Qualifier
- WC = Wild card
- LL = Lucky loser
- Alt = Alternate
- SE = Special exempt
- PR = Protected ranking
- ITF = ITF entry
- JE = Junior exempt
- w/o = Walkover
- r = Retired
- d = Defaulted
- SR = Special ranking

=== Finals ===
Semifinals
Q	(United Kingdom) Joshua Goodall	6^{5}	3
5	(Serbia) Ilija Bozoljac	7	6
(United States) Brendan Evans	7	6
(Ukraine) Sergei Bubka	5	4

Final
5	(Serbia) Ilija Bozoljac	7	4	6^{4}
(United States) Brendan Evans	6^{4}	6	7

=== Top half ===
First round
1	(Luxembourg) G Müller	4	4
(France) É Roger-Vasselin	6	6
(United States) S Jenkins	7	4	6^{3}
Q	(United Kingdom) J Goodall	6^{4}	6	7
WC	(United Kingdom) D Evans	3	6	2
(India) P Amritraj	6	3	6
(Australia) B Klein	4	4
7	(Australia) C Guccione	6	6
3	(Canada) F Dancevic	4	6	3
LL	(Bulgaria) G Dimitrov	6	4	6
(United Kingdom) A Bogdanovic	7	6
Q	(Japan) T Ito	6^{6}	2
WC	(United Kingdom) D Cox	1	3
(France) S Grosjean	6	6
(Slovenia) L Gregorc	6^{11}	6	6^{5}
6	(Serbia) I Bozoljac	7	1	7

Second round
(France) É Roger-Vasselin	6	2	6^{5}
Q	(United Kingdom) J Goodall	2	6	7
(India) P Amritraj	7	7
7	(Australia) C Guccione	6^{5}	6^{4}
LL	(Bulgaria) G Dimitrov	4	7	7
(United Kingdom) A Bogdanovic	6	5	6^{6}
(France) S Grosjean	w/o
6	(Serbia) I Bozoljac

Quarterfinals
Q	(United Kingdom) J Goodall	6	6
(India) P Amritraj	4	4
LL	(Bulgaria) G Dimitrov	6	3	4
6	(Serbia) I Bozoljac	1	6	6

Semifinals
Q	(United Kingdom) J Goodall	6^{5}	3
6	(Serbia) I Bozoljac	7	6

=== Bottom half ===
First round
6	(India) S Devvarman	6^{4}	7	4
Q	(Australia) S Groth	7	6^{10}	6
WC	(United Kingdom) C Fleming	6^{5}	5
(United States) B Evans	7	7
(South Africa) K Anderson	4	6	6^{4}
WC	(United Kingdom) C Eaton	6	4	7
(Turkey) M İlhan	2	4
4	(France) A Mannarino	6	6
8	(United States) J Levine	4	3
(Ukraine) S Bubka	6	6
(Russia) A Kudryavtsev	6	3	5
Q	(India) R Bopanna	2	6	7
(United States) R Ram	6	6
(Slovakia) K Beck	3	3
(Australia) M Matosevic	4	4
2	(United States) R Kendrick	6	6

Second round
Q	(Australia) S Groth	3	3
(United States) B Evans	6	6
WC	(United Kingdom) C Eaton	2	5
4	(France) A Mannarino	6	7
(Ukraine) S Bubka	4
Q	(India) R Bopanna	5	r
(United States) R Ram	6^{1}	4
2	(United States) R Kendrick	7	6

Quarterfinals
(United States) B Evans	6	2	7
4	(France) A Mannarino	3	6	5
(Ukraine) S Bubka	7	6
2	(United States) R Kendrick	6^{3}	3

Semifinals
(United States) B Evans	7	6
(Ukraine) S Bubka	5	4
