= 2007 Nottingham Open – Singles =

Singles
- 2007 Nottingham Open

Final
- Champion: (Croatia) Ivo Karlović
- Runner-up: (France) Arnaud Clément
- Score: 3–6, 6–4, 6–4

Details
- Draw: 32
- Seeds: 8

Events
Singles	Doubles
← 2006 ·	Nottingham Open	· 2008 →

Ivo Karlović defeated Arnaud Clément 3–6, 6–4, 6–4 to win the 2007 Nottingham Open singles event.

== Seeds ==
1. (France) Richard Gasquet (quarterfinals)
2. (Russia) Dmitry Tursunov (semifinals)
3. (Argentina) Agustín Calleri (first round)
4. (Sweden) Jonas Björkman (semifinals)
5. (Slovakia) Dominik Hrbatý (first round)
6. (France) Paul-Henri Mathieu (quarterfinals)
7. (Switzerland) Stanislas Wawrinka (first round)
8. (France) Arnaud Clément (finalist)

== Draw ==
=== Key ===
- Q = Qualifier
- WC = Wild card
- LL = Lucky loser
- Alt = Alternate
- SE = Special exempt
- PR = Protected ranking
- ITF = ITF entry
- JE = Junior exempt
- w/o = Walkover
- r = Retired
- d = Defaulted
- SR = Special ranking

=== Finals ===
Semifinals
8	(France) Arnaud Clément	6	6
4	(Sweden) Jonas Björkman	2	4
(Croatia) Ivo Karlović	7	6
2	(Russia) Dmitry Tursunov	5	4

Final
8	(France) Arnaud Clément	6	4	4
(Croatia) Ivo Karlović	3	6	6

=== Section 1 ===
First round
1	(France) R Gasquet	6	6
(United States) V Spadea	3	4
Q	(Czech Republic) J Vacek	7^{7}	6
(Ecuador) N Lapentti	6^{1}	3
Q	(United Kingdom) J Goodall	5	3
(Russia) T Gabashvili	7	6
(Sweden) T Johansson	5	2
8	(France) A Clément	7	6
4	(Sweden) J Björkman	6	6
WC	(United Kingdom) R Bloomfield	2	0
Q	(United States) J Gimelstob	4	4
(United States) A Delic	6	6
(South Korea) L Hyung-Taik	6	4	6
(Belarus) M Mirnyi	4	6	4
(United States) R Ginepri	3	4
6	(France) PH Mathieu	6	6

Second round
1	(France) R Gasquet	6	6
Q	(Czech Republic) J Vacek	4	0
(Russia) T Gabashvili	6^{5}	6	3
8	(France) A Clément	7^{7}	3	6
4	(Sweden) J Björkman	7	7^{7}
(United States) A Delic	5	6^{2}
(South Korea) L Hyung-Taik	6^{2}	0
6	(France) PH Mathieu	7^{7}	6

Quarterfinals
1	(France) R Gasquet	4	3
8	(France) A Clément	6	6
4	(Sweden) J Björkman	2	6	6
6	(France) PH Mathieu	6	3	4

Semifinals
8	(France) A Clément	6	6
4	(Sweden) J Björkman	2	4

=== Section 2 ===
First round
7	(Switzerland) S Wawrinka	3	6^{3}
(Croatia) I Karlović	6	7^{7}
(France) G Simon	6	4	6
(Romania) A Pavel	2	6	4
Q	(United Kingdom) J Baker	4	2
(Argentina) JM Del Potro	6	6
(Russia) I Kunitsyn	7^{10}	3	6
3	(Argentina) A Calleri	6^{8}	6	4
5	(Slovakia) D Hrbatý	3	4
(France) S Grosjean	6	6
WC	(United Kingdom) A Bogdanovic	4	6^{13}
(Spain) G García López	6	7^{15}
WC	(United Kingdom) T Henman	6	7^{7}
(United States) M Russell	1	6^{5}
(United States) R Kendrick	1	4
2	(Russia) D Tursunov	6	6

Second round
(Croatia) I Karlović	7^{7}	6^{4}	6
(France) G Simon	6^{4}	7^{7}	4
(Argentina) JM Del Potro	6	7
(Russia) I Kunitsyn	2	5
(France) S Grosjean	4	3
(Spain) G García López	6	6
WC	(United Kingdom) T Henman	6^{7}	6	2
2	(Russia) D Tursunov	7^{9}	3	6

Quarterfinals
(Croatia) I Karlović	7^{12}	7
(Argentina) JM Del Potro	6^{10}	5
(Spain) G García López	6	3	5
2	(Russia) D Tursunov	4	6	7

Semifinals
(Croatia) I Karlović	7	6
2	(Russia) D Tursunov	5	4
