= 2010 BMW Open =

- Date: 2–9 May
- Edition: 95th
- Category: World Tour 250
- Surface: Clay / outdoor
- Location: Munich, Germany
- Venue: MTTC Iphitos

Champions

Singles
- (Russia) Mikhail Youzhny

Doubles
- (Austria) Oliver Marach / (Spain) Santiago Ventura
← 2009 ·	BMW Open	· 2011 →

The 2010 BMW Open was a men's tennis tournament that was played on outdoor clay courts. It was the 95th edition of the BMW Open, and was part of the ATP World Tour 250 series of the 2010 ATP World Tour. The event took place in Munich, Germany, from 2 May until 9 May 2010.

The draw was led by the defending champion Tomáš Berdych, Russian Mikhail Youzhny and Croatian Marin Čilić.

== Entrants ==
=== Seeds ===
Player	Nationality	Ranking*	Seeding
Marin Čilić	Croatia	11	1
Mikhail Youzhny	Russia	13	2
Tomáš Berdych	Czech Republic	14	3
Philipp Kohlschreiber	Germany	29	4
Marcos Baghdatis	Cyprus	33	5
Nicolás Almagro	Spain	34	6
Julien Benneteau	France	36	7
Benjamin Becker	Germany	41	8

- Seedings are based on the rankings of April 26, 2010.

=== Other entrants ===
The following players received wildcards into the main draw:

- (Croatia) Mario Ančić
- (Germany) Nicolas Kiefer
- (Germany) Kevin Krawietz

The following players received entry from the qualifying draw:

- (France) Thierry Ascione
- (Germany) Peter Gojowczyk
- (Spain) Pere Riba
- (France) Alexandre Sidorenko

== Finals ==
=== Singles ===
(Russia) Mikhail Youzhny defeated (Croatia) Marin Čilić, 6–3, 4–6, 6–4

- It was Youzhny's first title of the year and 6th of his career.

=== Doubles ===
(Austria) Oliver Marach / (Spain) Santiago Ventura defeated (United States) Eric Butorac / (Germany) Michael Kohlmann, 5–7, 6–3, [16–14]
