= 2008 BMW Open – Doubles =

Doubles
- 2008 BMW Open

Final
- Champions: (Germany) Michael Berrer (Germany) Rainer Schüttler
- Runners-up: (United States) Scott Lipsky (United States) David Martin
- Score: 7–5, 3–6, [10–8]

Events
Singles	Doubles
← 2007 ·	BMW Open	· 2009 →

Philipp Kohlschreiber and Mikhail Youzhny were the defending champions, but chose not to participate that year.

Michael Berrer and Rainer Schüttler won in the final 7–5, 3–6, [10–8], against Scott Lipsky and David Martin.

== Seeds ==
1. (Czech Republic) František Čermák / (Australia) Jordan Kerr (first round)
2. (Germany) Christopher Kas / (Netherlands) Rogier Wassen (quarterfinals)
3. (India) Mahesh Bhupathi / (India) Rohan Bopanna (first round, retired to due a leg injury for Bhupathi)
4. (Czech Republic) Jaroslav Levinský / (Czech Republic) David Škoch (quarterfinals)

== Draw ==
=== Key ===
- Q = Qualifier
- WC = Wild card
- LL = Lucky loser
- Alt = Alternate
- ITF = ITF entry
- PR = Protected ranking
- SR = Special ranking
- SE = Special exempt
- JE = Junior exempt
- JR = Junior Accelerator Programme entrant
- CO = College Accelerator Programme entrant
- NG = Next Gen Accelerator Program entrant
- w/o = Walkover
- r = Retired
- d = Defaulted

=== Draw ===
First round
1	(Czech Republic) F Čermák (Australia) J Kerr	7	4	[4]
(Switzerland) Y Allegro (Australia) S Huss	5	6	[10]
(United States) T Parrott (Slovakia) F Polášek	2	6	[11]
(Italy) S Bolelli (Italy) A Seppi	6	4	[9]
3	(India) M Bhupathi (India) R Bopanna	6	0^{r}
(United States) E Butorac (Australia) A Fisher	2	1
(United States) S Lipsky (United States) D Martin	6	7^{7}
(Croatia) M Čilić (Croatia) L Zovko	3	6^{3}
(Chile) F González (Argentina) S Roitman	6	1	[2]
WC	(Germany) M Berrer (Germany) R Schüttler	4	6	[10]
(Argentina) JM del Potro (South Korea) H-t Lee	2	5
4	(Czech Republic) J Levinský (Czech Republic) D Škoch	6	7
(Czech Republic) T Cibulec (South Africa) C Haggard	4	4
(France) M Gicquel (Belgium) K Vliegen	6	6
WC	(Germany) B Becker (Germany) P Petzschner	6^{4}	2
2	(Germany) C Kas (Netherlands) R Wassen	7^{7}	6

Quarterfinals
(Switzerland) Y Allegro (Australia) S Huss	6	7^{8}
(United States) T Parrott (Slovakia) F Polášek	3	6^{6}
(United States) E Butorac (Australia) A Fisher	3	7^{7}	[6]
(United States) S Lipsky (United States) D Martin	6	6^{3}	[10]
WC	(Germany) M Berrer (Germany) R Schüttler	7	7
4	(Czech Republic) J Levinský (Czech Republic) D Škoch	5	5
(France) M Gicquel (Belgium) K Vliegen	6	6
2	(Germany) C Kas (Netherlands) R Wassen	4	3

Semifinals
(Switzerland) Y Allegro (Australia) S Huss	6^{5}	6	[8]
(United States) S Lipsky (United States) D Martin	7^{7}	3	[10]
WC	(Germany) M Berrer (Germany) R Schüttler	4	6	[10]
(France) M Gicquel (Belgium) K Vliegen	6	3	[4]

Final
(United States) S Lipsky (United States) D Martin	5	6	[8]
WC	(Germany) M Berrer (Germany) R Schüttler	7	3	[10]
