= 2011 Aegon Trophy – Women's singles =

Women's singles
- 2011 Aegon Trophy

Final
- Champions: (Greece) Eleni Daniilidou
- Runners-up: (Belarus) Olga Govortsova
- Score: 1–6, 6–4, 6–2

Events
| Singles | men | women |
| Doubles | men | women |
| ← 2010 · | Aegon Trophy | · 2012 → |

Elena Baltacha was the defending champion, but chose not to participate.
Eleni Daniilidou defeated Olga Govortsova 1–6, 6–4, 6–2 in the final to win the tournament.

== Seeds ==
1. (China) Zhang Shuai (first round)
2. (Italy) Romina Oprandi (quarterfinals)
3. (Austria) Tamira Paszek (quarterfinals)
4. (United States) Melanie Oudin (second round)
5. (United States) Coco Vandeweghe (second round)
6. (Croatia) Mirjana Lučić (first round)
7. (Georgia (country)) Anna Tatishvili (first round)
8. (United States) Irina Falconi (first round)

== Main draw ==
=== Key ===
- Q = Qualifier
- WC = Wild card
- LL = Lucky loser
- Alt = Alternate
- SE = Special exempt
- PR = Protected ranking
- ITF = ITF entry
- JE = Junior exempt
- w/o = Walkover
- r = Retired
- d = Defaulted
- SR = Special ranking

=== Finals ===
Semifinals
(Belarus) Olga Govortsova | 7 | 6
(Portugal) Michelle Larcher de Brito | 5 | 2
(Greece) Eleni Daniilidou | 6 | 6
(United States) Alison Riske | 0 | 2

Final
(Belarus) Olga Govortsova | 6 | 4 | 2
(Greece) Eleni Daniilidou | 1 | 6 | 6

=== Top half ===
First round
1 | (China) S Zhang | 0 | 3
(Chinese Taipei) K-c Chang | 6 | 6
(Belarus) O Govortsova | 6 | 6
Q | (Israel) J Glushko | 1 | 0
WC | (United Kingdom) N Broady | 4 | 6 | 5
(United Kingdom) A Keothavong | 6 | 3 | 7
(France) S Foretz Gacon | 6 | 6
6 | (Croatia) M Lučić | 4 | 4
4 | (United States) M Oudin | 7 | 4 | 6
(Thailand) N Lertcheewakarn | 6^{5} | 6 | 3
WC | (United Kingdom) E Webley-Smith | 5 | 6^{4}
(United States) S Stephens | 7 | 7
Q | (United Kingdom) Samantha Murray | 4 | 1
(Portugal) M Larcher de Brito | 6 | 6
Q | (China) J Lu | 6 | 6
8 | (United States) I Falconi | 2 | 4

Second round
(Chinese Taipei) K-c Chang | 4 | 4
(Belarus) O Govortsova | 6 | 6
(United Kingdom) A Keothavong | 1 | 6 | 2
(France) S Foretz Gacon | 6 | 3 | 6
4 | (United States) M Oudin | 3 | 4
(United States) S Stephens | 6 | 6
(Portugal) M Larcher de Brito | 6 | 4 | 6
Q | (China) Lu J-J | 0 | 6 | 1

Quarterfinals
(Belarus) O Govortsova | 7 | 7
(France) S Foretz Gacon | 6^{2} | 5
(United States) S Stephens | 3 | 6 | 2
(Portugal) M Larcher de Brito | 6 | 3 | 6

Semifinals
(Belarus) O Govortsova | 7 | 6
(Portugal) M Larcher de Brito | 5 | 2

=== Bottom half ===
First round
7 | (Georgia (country)) A Tatishvili | 6 | 6^{4} | 4
(Greece) E Daniilidou | 3 | 7 | 6
(United Kingdom) H Watson | 6^{4} | 4
Q | (Hungary) M Czink | 7 | 6
(Russia) V Savinykh | 6 | 6
WC | (United Kingdom) L Robson | 4 | 4
(Thailand) T Tanasugarn | 3 | 1
3 | (Austria) T Paszek | 6 | 6
5 | (United States) C Vandeweghe | 6 | 6
(United States) M Brengle | 3 | 3
(Luxembourg) A Kremer | 4 | 4
(United States) A Riske | 6 | 6
(Switzerland) S Vögele | 6^{5} | 6^{6}
WC | (United Kingdom) K O'Brien | 7 | 7
(Japan) J Namigata | 1 | 4
2 | (Italy) R Oprandi | 6 | 6

Second round
(Greece) E Daniilidou | 6 | 6
Q | (Hungary) M Czink | 4 | 4
(Russia) V Savinykh | 1 | 0
3 | (Austria) T Paszek | 6 | 6
5 | (United States) C Vandeweghe | 4 | 6^{5}
(United States) A Riske | 6 | 7
WC | (United Kingdom) K O'Brien | 4 | 6 | 3
2 | (Italy) R Oprandi | 6 | 3 | 6

Quarterfinals
(Greece) E Daniilidou | 0 | 6 | 6
3 | (Austria) T Paszek | 6 | 1 | 4
(United States) A Riske | 6 | 6
2 | (Italy) R Oprandi | 1 | 3

Semifinals
(Greece) E Daniilidou | 6 | 6
(United States) A Riske | 0 | 2
