= 2009 BMW Open – Singles =

Singles
- 2009 BMW Open

Final
- Champion: (Czech Republic) Tomáš Berdych
- Runner-up: (Russia) Mikhail Youzhny
- Score: 6–4, 4–6, 7–6^{(7–5)}

Details
- Draw: 32 (4 Q / 3 WC )
- Seeds: 8

Events
Singles	Doubles
← 2008 ·	BMW Open	· 2010 →

Fernando González was the defending champion, but was unable to play due to an injury.

== Seeds ==
1. (Chile) Fernando González (withdrew due to ankle injury)
2. (Croatia) Marin Čilić (quarterfinals)
3. (Spain) Nicolás Almagro (second round)
4. (Czech Republic) Tomáš Berdych (champion)
5. (Germany) Rainer Schüttler (first round)
6. (Germany) Nicolas Kiefer (second round)
7. (France) Paul-Henri Mathieu (quarterfinals)
8. (Russia) Igor Kunitsyn (first round)

== Draw ==
=== Key ===
- Q = Qualifier
- WC = Wild card
- LL = Lucky loser
- Alt = Alternate
- ITF = ITF entry
- PR = Protected ranking
- SR = Special ranking
- SE = Special exempt
- JE = Junior exempt
- JR = Junior Accelerator Programme entrant
- CO = College Accelerator Programme entrant
- NG = Next Gen Accelerator Program entrant
- w/o = Walkover
- r = Retired
- d = Defaulted

=== Finals ===
Semifinals
WC	(Germany) Daniel Brands	6	3	4
(Russia) Mikhail Youzhny	3	6	6
4	(Czech Republic) Tomáš Berdych	6	5	6
(France) Jérémy Chardy	1	7	2

Final
(Russia) Mikhail Youzhny	4	6	6^{5}
4	(Czech Republic) Tomáš Berdych	6	4	7^{7}

=== Top half ===
First round
Q	(Austria) A Peya	6	6^{5}	5
(France) J Benneteau	2	7^{7}	7
WC	(Germany) D Brands	6	7^{7}
(Austria) S Koubek	3	6^{2}
LL	(Switzerland) S Bohli	6	2	3
(Italy) S Bolelli	3	6	6
(Italy) P Starace	7	5	6
8	(Russia) I Kunitsyn	5	7	3
3	(Spain) N Almagro	6	6
(Czech Republic) J Hernych	3	4
(Russia) M Youzhny	6	7^{7}
(Czech Republic) I Minář	3	6^{5}
(Argentina) M Vassallo Argüello	1^{r}
(Germany) D Gremelmayr	5
LL	(Algeria) L Ouahab	3	2
7	(France) P-H Mathieu	6	6

Second round
(France) J Benneteau	4	6	6^{6}
WC	(Germany) D Brands	6	3	7^{8}
(Italy) S Bolelli	4	6^{5}
(Italy) P Starace	6	7^{7}
3	(Spain) N Almagro	6^{2}	4
(Russia) M Youzhny	7^{7}	6
(Germany) D Gremelmayr	1	4
7	(France) P-H Mathieu	6	6

Quarterfinals
WC	(Germany) D Brands	6	1
(Italy) P Starace	4	1^{r}
(Russia) M Youzhny	7	3	6
7	(France) P-H Mathieu	5	6	3

Semifinals
WC	(Germany) D Brands	6	3	4
(Russia) M Youzhny	3	6	6

=== Bottom half ===
First round
5	(Germany) R Schüttler	3	3
Q	(Netherlands) T de Bakker	6	6
WC	(Australia) L Hewitt	6	6^{2}	7^{10}
(Germany) P Petzschner	2	7^{7}	6^{8}
WC	(Germany) A Beck	6	6
(Germany) M Zverev	3	4
Q	(Germany) S Klör	6^{0}	4
4	(Czech Republic) T Berdych	7^{7}	6
6	(Germany) N Kiefer	2	6	6
(Latvia) E Gulbis	6	3	2
(Russia) E Korolev	3	3
(France) J Chardy	6	6
(Germany) P Kohlschreiber	6	2
(Germany) B Phau	2	1^{r}
Q	(Germany) D Kindlmann	3	2
2	(Croatia) M Čilić	6	6

Second round
Q	(Netherlands) T de Bakker	3	4
WC	(Australia) L Hewitt	6	6
WC	(Germany) A Beck	6	4	6^{4}
4	(Czech Republic) T Berdych	1	6	7^{7}
6	(Germany) N Kiefer	4	6^{9}
(France) J Chardy	6	7^{11}
(Germany) P Kohlschreiber	0	4
2	(Croatia) M Čilić	6	6

Quarterfinals
WC	(Australia) L Hewitt	6	3	6^{4}
4	(Czech Republic) T Berdych	4	6	7^{7}
(France) J Chardy	3	7	6
2	(Croatia) M Čilić	6	5	4

Semifinals
4	(Czech Republic) T Berdych	6	5	6
(France) J Chardy	1	7	2
