= 2011 Aegon Trophy – Women's doubles =

Women's doubles
- 2011 Aegon Trophy

Final
- Champions: (Japan) Kimiko Date-Krumm (China) Zhang Shuai
- Runners-up: (United States) Raquel Kops-Jones (United States) Abigail Spears
- Score: 6–4, 7–6(7)

Events
Singles	men	women
Doubles	men	women
← 2010 ·	Aegon Trophy	· 2012 →

Sarah Borwell and Raquel Kops-Jones were the defending champions. They both participated, but competed with different partners. Borwell played alongside Melanie South, while Kops-Jones decided to play with Abigail Spears.
Kimiko Date-Krumm and Zhang Shuai won the final against Kops-Jones and Spears 6–4, 7–6(7).

== Seeds ==
1. (United States) Raquel Kops-Jones / (United States) Abigail Spears (final)
2. (Zimbabwe) Cara Black / (Russia) Arina Rodionova (first round)
3. (Japan) Shuko Aoyama / (Japan) Rika Fujiwara (first round)
4. (Japan) Kimiko Date-Krumm / (China) Zhang Shuai (champions)

== Draw ==
=== Key ===
- Q = Qualifier
- WC = Wild card
- LL = Lucky loser
- Alt = Alternate
- SE = Special exempt
- PR = Protected ranking
- ITF = ITF entry
- JE = Junior exempt
- w/o = Walkover
- r = Retired
- d = Defaulted
- SR = Special ranking

=== Draw ===
First round
1	(United States) R Kops-Jones (United States) A Spears	6	6
(United States) M Oudin (Georgia (country)) A Tatishvili	3	4
WC	(United Kingdom) N Broady (United Kingdom) E Webley-Smith	3	4
(United Kingdom) S Borwell (United Kingdom) M South	6	6
3	(Japan) S Aoyama (Japan) R Fujiwara	5	6	[3]
(New Zealand) M Erakovic (Thailand) T Tanasugarn	7	1	[10]
(Greece) E Daniilidou (Switzerland) S Vögele	4	3
(United States) L Lee-Waters (United States) M Moulton-Levy	6	6
(United States) I Falconi (United States) C Vandeweghe	5	5
(Italy) R Oprandi (United States) S Stephens	7	7
WC	(United Kingdom) A Keothavong (United Kingdom) L Robson	6^{3}	2
4	(Japan) K Date-Krumm (China) S Zhang	7	6
(United States) M Brengle (China) J Lu	2	2
(Thailand) N Lertcheewakarn (Russia) V Savinykh	6	6
WC	(United Kingdom) J Rae (United Kingdom) H Watson	7	6
2	(Zimbabwe) C Black (Russia) A Rodionova	5	4

Quarterfinals
1	(United States) R Kops-Jones (United States) A Spears	3	6	[10]
(United Kingdom) S Borwell (United Kingdom) M South	6	2	[6]
(New Zealand) M Erakovic (Thailand) T Tanasugarn	6	6
(United States) L Lee-Waters (United States) M Moulton-Levy	2	2
(Italy) R Oprandi (United States) S Stephens	3	2
4	(Japan) K Date-Krumm (China) S Zhang	6	6
(Thailand) N Lertcheewakarn (Russia) V Savinykh	7	6
WC	(United Kingdom) J Rae (United Kingdom) H Watson	6^{1}	2

Semifinals
1	(United States) R Kops-Jones (United States) A Spears	7	7
(New Zealand) M Erakovic (Thailand) T Tanasugarn	6^{2}	5
4	(Japan) K Date-Krumm (China) S Zhang	3	6	[10]
(Thailand) N Lertcheewakarn (Russia) V Savinykh	6	3	[5]

Final
1	(United States) R Kops-Jones (United States) A Spears	4	6^{7}
4	(Japan) K Date-Krumm (China) S Zhang	6	7
