= 2009 Tallahassee Tennis Challenger =

- Date: April 20 – April 26
- Edition: 10th
- Location: Tallahassee, Florida, United States

Champions

Singles
- (United States) John Isner

Doubles
- (United States) Eric Butorac / (United States) Scott Lipsky
← 2008 ·	Tallahassee Tennis Challenger	· 2010 →

The 2009 Tallahassee Tennis Challenger was a professional tennis tournament played on outdoor hard courts. It was part of the 2009 ATP Challenger Tour. It took place in Tallahassee, Florida, United States between April 20 and April 26, 2009.

== Singles entrants ==
=== Seeds ===
Nationality	Player	Ranking*	Seeding
USA	Bobby Reynolds	67	1
USA	Robert Kendrick	82	2
USA	Kevin Kim	104	3
USA	Vince Spadea	109	4
CAN	Frank Dancevic	112	5
JPN	Go Soeda	117	6
USA	John Isner	126	7
USA	Jesse Levine	132	8

- Rankings are as of April 12, 2009.

=== Other entrants ===
The following players received wildcards into the singles main draw:

- (United States) Jean-Yves Aubone
- (United States) Taylor Dent
- (United States) Michael McClune
- (United States) Tim Smyczek

The following players received entry from the qualifying draw:

- (Lithuania) Ričardas Berankis
- (United Kingdom) Colin Fleming
- (Latvia) Andis Juška
- (United States) Jesse Witten

The following players received special exempt into the singles main draw:

- (South Korea) Im Kyu-tae

== Champions ==
=== Men's singles ===
(United States) John Isner def. (United States) Donald Young, 7–5, 6–4

=== Men's doubles ===
(United States) Eric Butorac / (United States) Scott Lipsky def. (United Kingdom) Colin Fleming / (United Kingdom) Ken Skupski, 6–1, 6–4
