= 2009 Tallahassee Tennis Challenger – Doubles =

Doubles
- 2009 Tallahassee Tennis Challenger

Final
- Champions: (United States) Eric Butorac (United States) Scott Lipsky
- Runners-up: (United Kingdom) Colin Fleming (United Kingdom) Ken Skupski
- Score: 6–1, 6–4

Events
Singles	Doubles
← 2008 ·	Tallahassee Tennis Challenger	· 2010 →

Rajeev Ram and Bobby Reynolds were the defending champions. They chose to not play this year.
Eric Butorac and Scott Lipsky won in the final 6–1, 6–4, against Colin Fleming and Ken Skupski.

== Seeds ==
1. (United States) Eric Butorac / (United States) Scott Lipsky (champions)
2. (Australia) Carsten Ball / (United States) David Martin (first round)
3. (Thailand) Sanchai Ratiwatana / (Thailand) Sonchat Ratiwatana (quarterfinals)
4. (Austria) Martin Fischer / (India) Harsh Mankad (quarterfinals)

== Draw ==
=== Key ===
- Q = Qualifier
- WC = Wild card
- LL = Lucky loser
- Alt = Alternate
- SE = Special exempt
- PR = Protected ranking
- ITF = ITF entry
- JE = Junior exempt
- w/o = Walkover
- r = Retired
- d = Defaulted
- SR = Special ranking

=== Draw ===
First round
1	(United States) E Butorac (United States) S Lipsky	6	6
(India) P Amritraj (United Kingdom) J Goodall	3	1
LL	(India) S Devvarman (Philippines) TC Huey	3	7	[4]
WC	(United States) P Simmonds (United States) J Witten	6	6^{3}	[10]
4	(Austria) M Fischer (India) H Mankad	6	1	[10]
Q	(Canada) F Niemeyer (Canada) V Pospisil	4	6	[8]
(United Kingdom) A Bogdanovic (Serbia) V Obradović	5	4
(Japan) G Soeda (Thailand) D Udomchoke	7	6
(United Kingdom) C Fleming (United Kingdom) K Skupski	6	6
(Australia) N Lindahl (Australia) M Matosevic	4	4
WC	(United States) J-Y Aubone (United States) R Harrison	3	3
3	(Thailand) Sa Ratiwatana (Thailand) So Ratiwatana	6	6
(United States) S Jenkins (United States) S Oudsema	6^{5}	6	[8]
(United States) R DeHeart (United States) A Kuznetsov	7	3	[10]
WC	(United States) V Mirzadeh (United States) M Sykut	6	0	[10]
2	(Australia) C Ball (United States) D Martin	2	6	[7]

Quarterfinals
1	(United States) E Butorac (United States) S Lipsky	6	6
WC	(United States) P Simmonds (United States) J Witten	2	1
4	(Austria) M Fischer (India) H Mankad	7	4	[5]
(Japan) G Soeda (Thailand) D Udomchoke	6^{4}	6	[10]
(United Kingdom) C Fleming (United Kingdom) K Skupski	6	7
3	(Thailand) Sa Ratiwatana (Thailand) So Ratiwatana	3	6^{1}
(United States) R DeHeart (United States) A Kuznetsov	3	7	[10]
WC	(United States) V Mirzadeh (United States) M Sykut	6	6^{3}	[7]

Semifinals
1	(United States) E Butorac (United States) S Lipsky	6	6
(Japan) G Soeda (Thailand) D Udomchoke	2	4
(United Kingdom) C Fleming (United Kingdom) K Skupski	6	7
(United States) R DeHeart (United States) A Kuznetsov	3	5

Finals
1	(United States) E Butorac (United States) S Lipsky	6	6
(United Kingdom) C Fleming (United Kingdom) K Skupski	1	4
