= 2007 Nottingham Open – Doubles =

Doubles
- 2007 Nottingham Open

Final
- Champions: (United States) Eric Butorac (United Kingdom) Jamie Murray
- Runners-up: (United Kingdom) Joshua Goodall (United Kingdom) Ross Hutchins
- Score: 4–6, 6–3, [10–5]

Events
Singles	Doubles
← 2006 ·	Nottingham Open	· 2008 →

Jonathan Erlich and Andy Ram were the defending champions, but lost in the semifinals this year.

Eric Butorac and Jamie Murray won the title, defeating Joshua Goodall and Ross Hutchins 4–6, 6–3, [10–5] in the final.

== Seeds ==
1. (Israel) Jonathan Erlich / (Israel) Andy Ram (semifinals)
2. (Australia) Ashley Fisher / (United States) Tripp Phillips (quarterfinals)
3. (United States) Eric Butorac / (United Kingdom) Jamie Murray (champions)
4. (India) Mahesh Bhupathi / (United States) Justin Gimelstob (first round)

== Draw ==
Key

- Q = Qualifier
- WC = Wild card
- LL = Lucky loser
- Alt = Alternate
- ITF = ITF entry
- PR = Protected ranking
- SR = Special ranking
- SE = Special exempt
- JE = Junior exempt
- JR = Junior Accelerator Programme entrant
- CO = College Accelerator Programme entrant
- NG = Next Gen Accelerator Program entrant
- w/o = Walkover
- r = Retired
- d = Defaulted

=== Draw ===
First round
1	(Israel) J Erlich (Israel) A Ram	6	6
(Slovakia) D Hrbatý (France) G Simon	2	1
(Brazil) M Melo (Brazil) A Sá	7^{7}	4	[10]
(Russia) I Kunitsyn (Russia) D Tursunov	6^{1}	6	[8]
4	(India) M Bhupathi (United States) J Gimelstob	7	4	[8]
WC	(United Kingdom) J Goodall (United Kingdom) R Hutchins	5	6	[10]
(France) A Clément (France) S Grosjean	6	6
(United States) T Parrott (Australia) T Perry	1	4
(Argentina) A Calleri (Ecuador) N Lapentti	7^{7}	6
WC	(United Kingdom) R Bloomfield (United Kingdom) J Marray	6^{4}	1
(United Kingdom) J Auckland (Australia) S Huss	4	6^{7}
3	(United States) E Butorac (United Kingdom) J Murray	6	7^{9}
(Spain) G García López (Switzerland) S Wawrinka	3	6	[7]
(Argentina) JM del Potro (Romania) A Pavel	6	3	[10]
(South Korea) H-t Lee (United States) M Russell	6^{5}	4
2	(Australia) A Fisher (United States) T Phillips	7^{7}	6

Quarterfinals
1	(Israel) J Erlich (Israel) A Ram	6	6
(Brazil) M Melo (Brazil) A Sá	1	4
WC	(United Kingdom) J Goodall (United Kingdom) R Hutchins	2	7	[17]
(France) A Clément (France) S Grosjean	6	5	[15]
(Argentina) A Calleri (Ecuador) N Lapentti	3	6	[2]
3	(United States) E Butorac (United Kingdom) J Murray	6	3	[10]
(Argentina) JM del Potro (Romania) A Pavel	6	6
2	(Australia) A Fisher (United States) T Phillips	3	2

Semifinals
1	(Israel) J Erlich (Israel) A Ram	6	3	[7]
WC	(United Kingdom) J Goodall (United Kingdom) R Hutchins	3	6	[10]
3	(United States) E Butorac (United Kingdom) J Murray	6	6
(Argentina) JM del Potro (Romania) A Pavel	3	3

Final
WC	(United Kingdom) J Goodall (United Kingdom) R Hutchins	6	3	[5]
3	(United States) E Butorac (United Kingdom) J Murray	4	6	[10]
