= 2011 BMW Open – Singles qualifying =

Qualifying for a tennis tournament in Munich

This article displays the qualifying draw of the 2011 BMW Open.

== Players ==
=== Seeds ===
1. (Russia) Dmitry Tursunov (second round)
2. (Germany) Julian Reister (qualified)
3. (Germany) Denis Gremelmayr (qualifying competition) (lucky loser)
4. (Germany) Björn Phau (second round)
5. (Netherlands) Jesse Huta Galung (second round)
6. (Germany) Simon Greul (first round)
7. (Austria) Martin Fischer (qualifying competition)
8. (Chile) Paul Capdeville (second round)

=== Qualifiers ===
1. (Colombia) Robert Farah
2. (Germany) Julian Reister
3. (Belgium) Steve Darcis
4. (Russia) Andrey Kuznetsov

=== Lucky losers ===
1. (Germany) Denis Gremelmayr

== Qualifying draw ==
=== First qualifier ===
First round
1	(Russia) Dmitry Tursunov	7	4	6
WC	(Germany) Peter Heller	6^{2}	6	3
(Australia) Peter Luczak	6	3	6^{3}
(Colombia) Robert Farah	4	6	7
(Germany) Bastian Knittel	6	6
(France) Maxime Teixeira	1	4
(Switzerland) Marco Chiudinelli	4	5
5	(Netherlands) Jesse Huta Galung	6	7

Second round
1	(Russia) Dmitry Tursunov	5	2
(Colombia) Robert Farah	7	6
(Germany) Bastian Knittel	5	7	7
5	(Netherlands) Jesse Huta Galung	7	5	6^{3}

Qualifying competition
(Colombia) Robert Farah	4	6	6
(Germany) Bastian Knittel	6	2	3

=== Second qualifier ===
First round
2	(Germany) Julian Reister	6	3	7
WC	(Germany) Jan-Lennard Struff	3	6	6^{5}
(Belgium) Ruben Bemelmans	6	6
(Australia) James Lemke	3	2
(Germany) Cedrik-Marcel Stebe	6	6^{9}	6
(Argentina) Federico del Bonis	3	7	3
(Italy) Matteo Viola	4	3
8	(Chile) Paul Capdeville	6	6

Second round
2	(Germany) Julian Reister	6	7
(Belgium) Ruben Bemelmans	4	5
(Germany) Cedrik-Marcel Stebe	7	6
8	(Chile) Paul Capdeville	5	4

Qualifying competition
2	(Germany) Julian Reister	6	3	6
(Germany) Cedrik-Marcel Stebe	3	6	4

=== Third qualifier ===
First round
3	(Germany) Denis Gremelmayr	6	4	6
(Romania) Marius Copil	3	6	3
WC	(Germany) Stephan Hoiß	5	0
(Colombia) Juan Sebastián Cabal	7	6
(Germany) Dominik Meffert	6	3	4
(Belgium) Steve Darcis	4	6	6
(Czech Republic) Jan Hernych	6	4	7
6	(Germany) Simon Greul	4	6	6^{5}

Second round
3	(Germany) Denis Gremelmayr	6	7
(Colombia) Juan Sebastián Cabal	2	6^{4}
(Belgium) Steve Darcis	7	7
(Czech Republic) Jan Hernych	6^{4}	5

Qualifying competition
3	(Germany) Denis Gremelmayr	6	4	2
(Belgium) Steve Darcis	2	6	6

=== Fourth qualifier ===
First round
4	(Germany) Björn Phau	6	6
(France) Kenny de Schepper	1	3
(Russia) Andrey Kuznetsov	6	6
WC	(Germany) Kevin Krawietz	3	3
(Poland) Jerzy Janowicz	6	6
(Russia) Konstantin Kravchuk	4	1
(Germany) Benedikt Dorsch	2	2
7	(Austria) Martin Fischer	6	6

Second round
4	(Germany) Björn Phau	3	6	3
(Russia) Andrey Kuznetsov	6	4	6
(Poland) Jerzy Janowicz	6^{5}	3
7	(Austria) Martin Fischer	7	6

Qualifying competition
(Russia) Andrey Kuznetsov	6	6
7	(Austria) Martin Fischer	3	4
