= 2009 Tallahassee Tennis Challenger – Singles =

Singles
- 2009 Tallahassee Tennis Challenger

Final
- Champion: (United States) John Isner
- Runner-up: (United States) Donald Young
- Score: 7–5, 6–4

Events
Singles	Doubles
← 2008 ·	Tallahassee Tennis Challenger	· 2010 →

Bobby Reynolds was the defender of championship title; however, he lost to Ryan Sweeting in the first round.
John Isner won in the final 7–5, 6–4, against Donald Young.

== Seeds ==
1. (United States) Bobby Reynolds (first round)
2. (United States) Robert Kendrick (semifinals)
3. (United States) Kevin Kim (second round)
4. (United States) Vince Spadea (second round)
5. (Canada) Frank Dancevic (first round)
6. (Japan) Go Soeda (second round)
7. (United States) John Isner (champion)
8. (United States) Jesse Levine (first round)

== Draw ==
=== Key ===
- Q = Qualifier
- WC = Wild card
- LL = Lucky loser
- Alt = Alternate
- ITF = ITF entry
- PR = Protected ranking
- SR = Special ranking
- SE = Special exempt
- JE = Junior exempt
- JR = Junior Accelerator Programme entrant
- CO = College Accelerator Programme entrant
- NG = Next Gen Accelerator Program entrant
- w/o = Walkover
- r = Retired
- d = Defaulted

=== Final four ===
Semifinals
Q	(Thailand) Danai Udomchoke	6	4	2
7	(United States) John Isner	1	6	6
(United States) Donald Young	2	7	6
2	(United States) Robert Kendrick	6	5	3

Final
7	(United States) John Isner	7	6
(United States) Donald Young	5	4

=== Top half ===
First round
1	(United States) B Reynolds	1	6^{4}
(United States) R Sweeting	6	7
WC	(United States) J-Y Aubone	7	7
(Brazil) J Souza	5	5
(Australia) C Ball	6	6
(Lithuania) R Berankis	3	0
Q	(Thailand) D Udomchoke	6	6
8	(United States) J Levine	3	1
4	(United States) V Spadea	5	7	7
(United Kingdom) J Goodall	7	5	5
(India) P Amritraj	6^{3}	7	7
WC	(United States) M McClune	7	5	6^{3}
WC	(United States) T Smyczek	2	2
(Sweden) B Rehnquist	6	6
(United States) S Jenkins	4	1
7	(United States) J Isner	6	6

Second round
(United States) R Sweeting	6	4	6
WC	(United States) J-Y Aubone	4	6	2
(Australia) C Ball	4	6	3
Q	(Thailand) D Udomchoke	6	3	6
4	(United States) V Spadea	4	1
(India) P Amritraj	6	6
(Sweden) B Rehnquist	1	6^{4}
7	(United States) J Isner	6	7

Quarterfinals
(United States) R Sweeting	5	7	3
Q	(Thailand) D Udomchoke	7	5	6
(India) P Amritraj	7	3	4
7	(United States) J Isner	6^{5}	6	6

Semifinals
Q	(Thailand) D Udomchoke	6	4	2
7	(United States) J Isner	1	6	6

=== Bottom half ===
First round
6	(Japan) G Soeda	6	2	7
Q	(United Kingdom) C Fleming	3	6	6^{4}
(United States) D Young	6	6^{5}	6
Q	(Latvia) A Juška	4	7	3
SE	(South Korea) KT Im	6	6
(United Kingdom) A Bogdanovic	4	4
(United States) A Delić	6^{4}	4
3	(United States) K Kim	7	6
5	(Canada) F Dancevic	3	4
(Austria) M Fischer	6	6
(India) S Devvarman	3	3
(Australia) M Matosevic	6	6
Q	(United States) J Witten	7	7
WC	(United States) T Dent	6^{1}	6^{2}
(Ecuador) G Lapentti	5	6	4
2	(United States) R Kendrick	7	4	6

Second round
6	(Japan) G Soeda	2	3
(United States) D Young	6	6
SE	(South Korea) KT Im	7	6
3	(United States) K Kim	6^{8}	2
(Austria) M Fischer	6^{8}	2
(Australia) M Matosevic	7	6
Q	(United States) J Witten	3	5
2	(United States) R Kendrick	6	7

Quarterfinals
(United States) D Young	6	4
SE	(South Korea) KT Im	4	3	r
(Australia) M Matosevic	4	3
2	(United States) R Kendrick	6	6

Semifinals
(United States) D Young	2	7	6
2	(United States) R Kendrick	6	5	3
