= 2007 Nottingham Open =

- Date: 18–24 June
- Edition: 18th
- Category: International Series
- Draw: 32S / 16D
- Prize money: $391,000
- Surface: Grass / outdoor
- Location: Nottingham, United Kingdom
- Venue: Nottingham Tennis Centre

Champions

Singles
- (Croatia) Ivo Karlović

Doubles
- (United States) Eric Butorac / (United Kingdom) Jamie Murray
- Nottingham Open

The 2007 Nottingham Open was the 2007 edition of the Nottingham Open men's tennis tournament that was part of the International Series of the 2007 ATP Tour. It was the 18th edition of the tournament and was held from 18 to 24 June and played on outdoor grass courts at the Nottingham Tennis Centre in Nottingham, United Kingdom. Second-seeded Ivo Karlović won the singles title.

== Finals ==
=== Singles ===
(Croatia) Ivo Karlović defeated (France) Arnaud Clément, 3–6, 6–4, 6–4

- It was Karlović's 2nd singles title of the year and of his career.

=== Doubles ===
(United States) Eric Butorac / (United Kingdom) Jamie Murray defeated (United Kingdom) Joshua Goodall / (United Kingdom) Ross Hutchins, 4–6, 6–3, [10–5]
