= 2011 Aegon Trophy – Men's doubles =

Men's doubles
- 2011 Aegon Trophy

Final
- Champions: (United Kingdom) Colin Fleming (United Kingdom) Ross Hutchins
- Runners-up: (Germany) Dustin Brown (Germany) Martin Emmrich
- Score: 4–6, 7–6(8), [13–11]

Events
Singles	men	women
Doubles	men	women
← 2010 ·	Aegon Trophy	· 2012 →

Colin Fleming and Ken Skupski were the defending champions but decided not to participate together.
Skupski played alongside Carsten Ball. However, they lost to Daniel Cox and James Ward in the quarterfinals.
Fleming partnered up with Ross Hutchins. They won the title, defeating Dustin Brown and Martin Emmrich 4–6, 7–6(8), [13–11] in the final.

== Seeds ==
1. (United Kingdom) Colin Fleming / (United Kingdom) Ross Hutchins (champions)
2. (Australia) Carsten Ball / (United Kingdom) Ken Skupski (quarterfinals)
3. (Germany) Dustin Brown / (Germany) Martin Emmrich (final)
4. (Sweden) Johan Brunström / (Denmark) Frederik Nielsen (first round)

== Draw ==
=== Key ===
- Q = Qualifier
- WC = Wild card
- LL = Lucky loser
- Alt = Alternate
- SE = Special exempt
- PR = Protected ranking
- ITF = ITF entry
- JE = Junior exempt
- w/o = Walkover
- r = Retired
- d = Defaulted
- SR = Special ranking

=== Draw ===
First round
1	(United Kingdom) C Fleming (United Kingdom) R Hutchins	6	6
WC	(United Kingdom) C Eaton (United Kingdom) J Goodall	2	4
(Switzerland) Y Allegro (France) A Mannarino	6^{5}	6	[13]
(Thailand) Sa Ratiwatana (Thailand) So Ratiwatana	7	2	[11]
4	(Sweden) J Brunström (Denmark) F Nielsen	6^{5}	6^{5}
(Russia) M Elgin (Russia) A Kudryavtsev	7	7
(United States) A Bogomolov Jr. (United States) B Reynolds	6	7
(United States) T Rettenmaier (South Africa) I van der Merwe	2	5
(South Africa) R de Voest (India) S Devvarman	4	4
(United Kingdom) J Delgado (France) É Roger-Vasselin	6	6
(Philippines) TC Huey (India) P Raja	7	4	[12]
3	(Germany) D Brown (Germany) M Emmrich	6^{4}	6	[14]
(Germany) A Beck (United States) R Sweeting	6	4	[5]
WC	(United Kingdom) D Cox (United Kingdom) J Ward	4	6	[10]
(United Kingdom) D Rice (United Kingdom) S Thornley	3	6^{7}
2	(Australia) C Ball (United Kingdom) K Skupski	6	7

Quarterfinals
1	(United Kingdom) C Fleming (United Kingdom) R Hutchins	7	6
(Switzerland) Y Allegro (France) A Mannarino	5	1
(Russia) M Elgin (Russia) A Kudryavtsev	6	6
(United States) A Bogomolov Jr. (United States) B Reynolds	3	2
(United Kingdom) J Delgado (France) É Roger-Vasselin	6^{2}	3
3	(Germany) D Brown (Germany) M Emmrich	7	6
WC	(United Kingdom) D Cox (United Kingdom) J Ward	6	7
2	(Australia) C Ball (United Kingdom) K Skupski	3	5

Semifinals
1	(United Kingdom) C Fleming (United Kingdom) R Hutchins	6	7
(Russia) M Elgin (Russia) A Kudryavtsev	3	5
3	(Germany) D Brown (Germany) M Emmrich	6	6
WC	(United Kingdom) D Cox (United Kingdom) J Ward	4	2

Final
1	(United Kingdom) C Fleming (United Kingdom) R Hutchins	4	7	[13]
3	(Germany) D Brown (Germany) M Emmrich	6	6^{8}	[11]
