= 2011 BMW Open – Doubles =

Doubles
- 2011 BMW Open

Final
- Champions: (Italy) Simone Bolelli (Argentina) Horacio Zeballos
- Runners-up: (Germany) Andreas Beck (Germany) Christopher Kas
- Score: 7–6(3), 6–4

Events
Singles	Doubles
← 2010 ·	BMW Open	· 2012 →

Oliver Marach and Santiago Ventura were the defending champions, but decided not to participate. Marach competed in the Serbia Open instead.
Simone Bolelli of Italy and Horacio Zeballos of Argentina defeated in the final the German couple Andreas Beck and Christopher Kas 7–6(3), 6–4 to win the title.

== Seeds ==
1. (Slovakia) Michal Mertiňák / (South Africa) Wesley Moodie (first round)
2. (Ukraine) Sergiy Stakhovsky / (Russia) Mikhail Youzhny (first round)
3. (Netherlands) Robin Haase / (Poland) Łukasz Kubot (first round)
4. (Italy) Daniele Bracciali / (Italy) Potito Starace (first round)

== Draw ==
=== Key ===
- Q = Qualifier
- WC = Wild card
- LL = Lucky loser
- Alt = Alternate
- SE = Special exempt
- PR = Protected ranking
- ITF = ITF entry
- JE = Junior exempt
- w/o = Walkover
- r = Retired
- d = Defaulted
- SR = Special ranking

=== Draw ===
First round
1	(Slovakia) M Mertiňák (South Africa) W Moodie	2	4
(Germany) A Beck (Germany) C Kas	6	6
(Croatia) M Čilić (Croatia) I Dodig	6	3	[8]
(Germany) D Brands (Germany) F Mayer	3	6	[10]
3	(Netherlands) R Haase (Poland) Ł Kubot	4	1
(Bulgaria) G Dimitrov (Germany) P Petzschner	6	6
(United States) J Cerretani (Canada) A Shamasdin	7	3	[10]
(Kazakhstan) A Golubev (Uzbekistan) D Istomin	6^{3}	6	[8]
WC	(Germany) T Haas (Czech Republic) R Štěpánek	6	3	[8]
(Sweden) S Aspelin (Australia) P Hanley	2	6	[10]
(Germany) D Brown (Germany) M Kohlmann	7	6
4	(Italy) D Bracciali (Italy) P Starace	6^{8}	4
WC	(Germany) M Bachinger (Germany) K Krawietz	3	4
(Italy) S Bolelli (Argentina) H Zeballos	6	6
(Russia) T Gabashvili (Netherlands) R Wassen	3	6	[10]
2	(Ukraine) S Stakhovsky (Russia) M Youzhny	6	3	[5]

Quarterfinals
(Germany) A Beck (Germany) C Kas	6	6
(Germany) D Brands (Germany) F Mayer	3	4
(Bulgaria) G Dimitrov (Germany) P Petzschner	3	6	[5]
(United States) J Cerretani (Canada) A Shamasdin	6	3	[10]
(Sweden) S Aspelin (Australia) P Hanley	6	3	[10]
(Germany) D Brown (Germany) M Kohlmann	2	6	[6]
(Italy) S Bolelli (Argentina) H Zeballos	6	6
(Russia) T Gabashvili (Netherlands) R Wassen	1	3

Semifinals
(Germany) A Beck (Germany) C Kas	6	6
(United States) J Cerretani (Canada) A Shamasdin	4	3
(Sweden) S Aspelin (Australia) P Hanley	1	6	[3]
(Italy) S Bolelli (Argentina) H Zeballos	6	3	[10]

Final
(Germany) A Beck (Germany) C Kas	6^{3}	4
(Italy) S Bolelli (Argentina) H Zeballos	7	6
