= 2007 BMW Open =

- Date: 30 April – 6 May
- Edition: 92nd
- Category: International Series
- Draw: 32S / 16D
- Prize money: $391,000
- Surface: Clay / outdoor
- Location: Munich, Germany
- Venue: MTTC Iphitos

Champions

Singles
- (Germany) Philipp Kohlschreiber

Doubles
- (Germany) Philipp Kohlschreiber / (Russia) Mikhail Youzhny
← 2006 ·	BMW Open	· 2008 →

The 2007 BMW Open was a men's tennis tournament that was part of the 2007 ATP Tour. It was the 92nd edition of the event and was played on outdoor clay courts in Munich, Germany between 30 April and 6 May 2007. The tournament was won by Philipp Kohlschreiber in men's singles and Philipp Kohlschreiber and Mikhail Youzhny in men's doubles.

== Finals ==
=== Singles ===
(Germany) Philipp Kohlschreiber defeated (Russia) Mikhail Youzhny, 2–6, 6–3, 6–4

=== Doubles ===
(Germany) Philipp Kohlschreiber / (Russia) Mikhail Youzhny defeated (Czech Republic) Jan Hájek / (Czech Republic) Jaroslav Levinský, 6–1, 6–4
