= 2009 BMW Open =

- Date: 2–10 May
- Edition: 94th
- Category: World Tour 250
- Surface: Clay / outdoor
- Location: Munich, Germany
- Venue: MTTC Iphitos

Champions

Singles
- (Czech Republic) Tomáš Berdych

Doubles
- (Czech Republic) Jan Hernych / (Czech Republic) Ivo Minář
← 2008 ·	BMW Open	· 2010 →

The 2009 BMW Open was a tennis tournament that was played on outdoor clay courts. It was the 94th edition of the BMW Open, and part of the ATP World Tour 250 series of the 2009 ATP World Tour. The men's events took place in Munich, Germany, from 2 May through 10 May 2009.

The men's draw was headlined by the defending champions, Chilean Fernando González and Croatian Marin Čilić.

== Entrants ==
=== Seeds ===
Player	Nationality	Ranking*	Seeding
Fernando González	Chile	13	1
Marin Čilić	Croatia	15	2
Nicolás Almagro	Spain	21	3
Tomáš Berdych	Czech Republic	26	4
Rainer Schüttler	Germany	29	5
Nicolas Kiefer	Germany	30	6
Paul-Henri Mathieu	France	35	7
Igor Kunitsyn	Russia	38	8

- Seedings are based on the rankings of April 27, 2009.

=== Other entrants ===
The following players received wildcards into the main draw:

- (Germany) Daniel Brands
- (Australia) Lleyton Hewitt
- (Germany) Andreas Beck

The following players received entry from the qualifying draw:

- (Netherlands) Thiemo de Bakker
- (Germany) Dieter Kindlmann
- (Austria) Alexander Peya
- (Germany) Sascha Klör
- (Algeria) Lamine Ouahab (lucky loser)
- (Switzerland) Stéphane Bohli (lucky loser)

== Finals ==
=== Singles ===
(Czech Republic) Tomáš Berdych defeated (Russia) Mikhail Youzhny, 6–4, 4–6, 7–6^{(7–5)}

- It was Berdych's first title of the year and 5th of his career.

=== Doubles ===
(Czech Republic) Jan Hernych / (Czech Republic) Ivo Minář defeated (Australia) Ashley Fisher / (Australia) Jordan Kerr, 6–4, 6–4
