= 2011 Aegon Trophy – Men's singles =

Men's singles
- 2011 Aegon Trophy

Final
- Champion: (Luxembourg) Gilles Müller
- Runner-up: (Germany) Matthias Bachinger
- Score: 7–6(4), 6–2

Events
Singles	men	women
Doubles	men	women
- Aegon Trophy

Ričardas Berankis was the defending champion, but chose not to participate.
Gilles Müller won this tournament, defeating Matthias Bachinger 7–6(4), 6–2 in the final.

== Seeds ==
1. (France) Adrian Mannarino (first round)
2. (India) Somdev Devvarman (first round)
3. (United States) Ryan Sweeting (second round)
4. (Russia) Dmitry Tursunov (quarterfinals)
5. (United States) Alex Bogomolov Jr. (second round)
6. (United States) Donald Young (first round)
7. (Germany) Matthias Bachinger (final)
8. (United States) Bobby Reynolds (second round)

== Main draw ==
Key

- Q = Qualifier
- WC = Wild card
- LL = Lucky loser
- Alt = Alternate
- ITF = ITF entry
- PR = Protected ranking
- SR = Special ranking
- SE = Special exempt
- JE = Junior exempt
- JR = Junior Accelerator Programme entrant
- CO = College Accelerator Programme entrant
- NG = Next Gen Accelerator Program entrant
- w/o = Walkover
- r = Retired
- d = Defaulted

=== Finals ===
Semifinals
(Japan) Tatsuma Ito	6^{4}	1
7	(Germany) Matthias Bachinger	7	6
(Luxembourg) Gilles Müller	6	6
WC	(Australia) Bernard Tomic	3	4

Final
7	(Germany) Matthias Bachinger	6^{4}	2
(Luxembourg) Gilles Müller	7	6

=== Top half ===
First round
1	(France) A Mannarino	4	1
(Switzerland) S Bohli	6	6
WC	(United Kingdom) D Cox	4	6^{4}
(South Africa) R de Voest	6	7
(South Africa) I van der Merwe	4	4
(Japan) T Ito	6	6
Q	(Republic of Ireland) C Niland	6	6
6	(United States) D Young	3	1
4	(Russia) D Tursunov	7	6
(France) É Roger-Vasselin	6^{4}	4
(United States) T Smyczek	7	4	6^{6}
Q	(United Kingdom) J Ward	5	6	7
(Russia) A Kudryavtsev	6	5	0^{r}
Q	(United States) A Kuznetsov	3	7	1
Q	(Japan) Y Sugita	1	3
7	(Germany) M Bachinger	6	6

Second round
(Switzerland) S Bohli	6	6
(South Africa) R de Voest	4	2
(Japan) T Ito	6	5	6
Q	(Republic of Ireland) C Niland	4	7	4
4	(Russia) D Tursunov	6	7
Q	(United Kingdom) J Ward	1	5
Q	(United States) A Kuznetsov	4	4
7	(Germany) M Bachinger	6	6

Quarterfinals
(Switzerland) S Bohli	6	6^{6}	3
(Japan) T Ito	1	7	6
4	(Russia) D Tursunov	6	4	1
7	(Germany) M Bachinger	3	6	6

Semifinals
(Japan) T Ito	6^{4}	1
7	(Germany) M Bachinger	7	6

=== Bottom half ===
First round
5	(United States) A Bogomolov Jr.	6^{6}	7	6
(Japan) G Soeda	7	5	2
(Australia) M Ebden	7	3	7
(Slovakia) L Lacko	6^{3}	6	5
(Germany) A Beck	7	4	4
(Luxembourg) G Müller	6^{4}	6	6
WC	(United Kingdom) D Evans	6	0	1
3	(United States) R Sweeting	1	6	6
8	(United States) B Reynolds	7	1	7
(Slovakia) K Beck	5	6	5
WC	(Australia) B Tomic	6	6
(Australia) C Ball	3	4
(Belgium) R Bemelmans	6	6
WC	(United Kingdom) J Milton	4	1
(Australia) M Matosevic	4	6	6
2	(India) S Devvarman	6	3	2

Second round
5	(United States) A Bogomolov Jr.	6	3	2
(Australia) M Ebden	4	6	6
(Luxembourg) G Müller	7	6
3	(United States) R Sweeting	6^{4}	4
8	(United States) B Reynolds	4	1
WC	(Australia) B Tomic	6	6
(Belgium) R Bemelmans	4	4
(Australia) M Matosevic	6	6

Quarterfinals
(Australia) M Ebden	7	4	3
(Luxembourg) G Müller	5	6	6
WC	(Australia) B Tomic	6	6
(Australia) M Matosevic	1	2

Semifinals
(Luxembourg) G Müller	6	6
WC	(Australia) B Tomic	3	4
