= 2010 BMW Open – Singles =

Singles
- 2010 BMW Open

Final
- Champion: (Russia) Mikhail Youzhny
- Runner-up: (Croatia) Marin Čilić
- Score: 6–3, 4–6, 6–4

Details
- Draw: 32 (4 Q / 3 WC )
- Seeds: 8

Events
Singles	Doubles
← 2009 ·	BMW Open	· 2011 →

Tomáš Berdych was the defender of title; however, he lost to Philipp Petzschner in the quarterfinals. Mikhail Youzhny won in the final 6–3, 4–6, 6–4 against Marin Čilić.

Former world no. 7 Mario Ančić played his last professional match of his career, losing in straight sets to Daniel Köllerer in the first round. He would announce his retirement the following year due to recurrence of his mononucleosis.

== Seeds ==
1. (Croatia) Marin Čilić (finals)
2. (Russia) Mikhail Youzhny (champion)
3. (Czech Republic) Tomáš Berdych (quarterfinals)
4. (Germany) Philipp Kohlschreiber (quarterfinals)
5. (Cyprus) Marcos Baghdatis (semifinals)
6. (Spain) Nicolás Almagro (quarterfinals)
7. (France) Julien Benneteau (first round)
8. (Germany) Benjamin Becker (second round)

== Draw ==
=== Key ===
- Q = Qualifier
- WC = Wild card
- LL = Lucky loser
- Alt = Alternate
- SE = Special exempt
- PR = Protected ranking
- ITF = ITF entry
- JE = Junior exempt
- w/o = Walkover
- r = Retired
- d = Defaulted
- SR = Special ranking

=== Finals ===
Semifinals
1	(Croatia) Marin Čilić	3	6	6
5	(Cyprus) Marcos Baghdatis	6	2	3
(Germany) Philipp Petzschner	5	6^{5}
2	(Russia) Mikhail Youzhny	7	7^{7}

Final
1	(Croatia) Marin Čilić	3	6	4
2	(Russia) Mikhail Youzhny	6	4	6

=== Top half ===
First round
1	(Croatia) M Čilić	6	6
(Germany) M Berrer	4	2
WC	(Germany) N Kiefer	5	2
(Germany) S Greul	7	6
(Germany) M Zverev	5^{r}
(South Africa) K Anderson	6
(Belgium) K Vliegen	3	1
6	(Spain) N Almagro	6	6
4	(Germany) P Kohlschreiber	6	6
(Germany) D Brands	4	4
(Spain) S Ventura	6^{5}	6	6
(Ukraine) O Dolgopolov Jr.	7^{7}	3	3
Q	(France) T Ascione	0	4
(Switzerland) M Chiudinelli	6	6
Q	(Germany) P Gojowczyk	6	1	2
5	(Cyprus) M Baghdatis	3	6	6

Second round
1	(Croatia) M Čilić	6^{6}	6	7
(Germany) S Greul	7^{8}	2	5
(South Africa) K Anderson	2	7	6^{5}
6	(Spain) N Almagro	6	5	7^{7}
4	(Germany) P Kohlschreiber	6	6
(Spain) S Ventura	2	1
(Switzerland) M Chiudinelli	3	4
5	(Cyprus) M Baghdatis	6	6

Quarterfinals
1	(Croatia) M Čilić	6	6^{2}	6
6	(Spain) N Almagro	4	7^{7}	2
4	(Germany) P Kohlschreiber	3	4
5	(Cyprus) M Baghdatis	6	6

Semifinals
1	(Croatia) M Čilić	3	6	6
5	(Cyprus) M Baghdatis	6	2	3

=== Bottom half ===
First round
7	(France) J Benneteau	6	3	3
(Germany) P Petzschner	3	6	6
(Austria) D Köllerer	7^{7}	7
WC	(Croatia) M Ančić	6^{7}	5
(Slovakia) L Lacko	7	1	2
Q	(Spain) P Riba	5	6	6
WC	(Germany) K Krawietz	1	1
3	(Czech Republic) T Berdych	6	6
8	(Germany) B Becker	6	4	6
(France) S Robert	4	6	0
(Czech Republic) J Hájek	6	6
Q	(France) A Sidorenko	1	2
(Uzbekistan) D Istomin	6	6^{3}	1
(Germany) A Beck	2	7^{7}	6
(France) J Chardy	1	4
2	(Russia) M Youzhny	6	6

Second round
(Germany) P Petzschner	6	6
(Austria) D Köllerer	1	4
Q	(Spain) P Riba	5	1
3	(Czech Republic) T Berdych	7	6
8	(Germany) B Becker	4	0
(Czech Republic) J Hájek	6	6
(Germany) A Beck	3	3
2	(Russia) M Youzhny	6	6

Quarterfinals
(Germany) P Petzschner	1	6	6
3	(Czech Republic) T Berdych	6	3	4
(Czech Republic) J Hájek	1	3
2	(Russia) M Youzhny	6	6

Semifinals
(Germany) P Petzschner	5	6^{5}
2	(Russia) M Youzhny	7	7^{7}
