= 2007 BMW Open – Doubles =

Tennis tournament

Doubles
- 2007 BMW Open

Final
- Champions: (Germany) Philipp Kohlschreiber (Russia) Mikhail Youzhny
- Runners-up: (Czech Republic) Jan Hájek (Czech Republic) Jaroslav Levinský
- Score: 6–1, 6–4

Events
Singles	Doubles
← 2006 ·	BMW Open	· 2008 →

Andrei Pavel and Alexander Waske were the defending champions. Pavel did not participate this year. Waske partnered with Julian Knowle, losing in the first round.

Philipp Kohlschreiber and Mikhail Youzhny won in the final 6–1, 6–4, against Jan Hájek and Jaroslav Levinský.

== Seeds ==
1. (Austria) Julian Knowle / (Germany) Alexander Waske (first round)
2. (Czech Republic) Petr Pála / (Czech Republic) Pavel Vízner (first round)
3. (Switzerland) Yves Allegro / (United States) Jim Thomas (first round)
4. (Australia) Ashley Fisher / (South Africa) Chris Haggard (first round)

== Draw ==
=== Key ===
- Q = Qualifier
- WC = Wild card
- LL = Lucky loser
- Alt = Alternate
- ITF = ITF entry
- PR = Protected ranking
- SR = Special ranking
- SE = Special exempt
- JE = Junior exempt
- JR = Junior Accelerator Programme entrant
- CO = College Accelerator Programme entrant
- NG = Next Gen Accelerator Program entrant
- w/o = Walkover
- r = Retired
- d = Defaulted

=== Draw ===
First round
1	(Austria) J Knowle (Germany) A Waske	6	4	[5]
WC	(Germany) A Beck (Germany) D Meffert	2	6	[10]
(Germany) B Becker (Germany) C Kas	4	2
(India) M Bhupathi (Czech Republic) R Štěpánek	6	6
3	(Switzerland) Y Allegro (United States) J Thomas	2	5
(Germany) P Kohlschreiber (Russia) M Youzhny	6	7
(Cyprus) M Baghdatis (Finland) J Nieminen	7	7^{7}
WC	(Germany) M Bachinger (Germany) T Behrend	5	6^{5}
Alt	(France) N Devilder (Argentina) D Hartfield	7	3	[7]
(France) A Clément (France) S Grosjean	5	6	[10]
(Czech Republic) J Hájek (Czech Republic) J Levinský	7^{7}	5	[10]
4	(Australia) A Fisher (South Africa) C Haggard	6^{4}	7	[6]
(Austria) S Koubek (Belgium) O Rochus	6	4	[10]
(Sweden) T Johansson (Australia) T Perry	1	6	[5]
(Germany) M Kohlmann (Germany) R Schüttler	6	6
2	(Czech Republic) P Pála (Czech Republic) P Vízner	3	4

Quarterfinals
WC	(Germany) A Beck (Germany) D Meffert	1	5
(India) M Bhupathi (Czech Republic) R Štěpánek	6	7
(Germany) P Kohlschreiber (Russia) M Youzhny	1	6	[10]
(Cyprus) M Baghdatis (Finland) J Nieminen	6	4	[5]
(France) A Clément (France) S Grosjean	2	4
(Czech Republic) J Hájek (Czech Republic) J Levinský	6	6
(Austria) S Koubek (Belgium) O Rochus	6^{5}	7^{8}	[10]
(Germany) M Kohlmann (Germany) R Schüttler	7^{7}	6^{6}	[3]

Semifinals
(India) M Bhupathi (Czech Republic) R Štěpánek	6	3	[8]
(Germany) P Kohlschreiber (Russia) M Youzhny	4	6	[10]
(Czech Republic) J Hájek (Czech Republic) J Levinský	6	6
(Austria) S Koubek (Belgium) O Rochus	3	4

Final
(Germany) P Kohlschreiber (Russia) M Youzhny	6	6
(Czech Republic) J Hájek (Czech Republic) J Levinský	1	4
