= 2010 Aegon Trophy =

Tennis tournament

- Date: May 31 – June 6
- Edition: 2nd
- Location: Nottingham, Great Britain

Champions

Men's singles
- (Lithuania) Ričardas Berankis

Women's singles
- (United Kingdom) Elena Baltacha

Men's doubles
- (United Kingdom) Colin Fleming / (United Kingdom) Ken Skupski

Women's doubles
- (United Kingdom) Sarah Borwell / (United States) Raquel Kops-Jones
| ← 2009 · | Aegon Trophy | · 2011 → |

The 2010 Aegon Trophy was a professional tennis tournament played on outdoor grass courts. It was part of the 2010 ATP Challenger Tour. It took place in Nottingham, Great Britain between May 31 and June 6, 2010.

== ATP entrants ==
=== Seeds ===
| Nationality | Player | Ranking* | Seeding |
|---|---|---|---|
| FRA | Arnaud Clément | 76 | 1 |
| USA | Rajeev Ram | 89 | 2 |
| RSA | Kevin Anderson | 93 | 3 |
| USA | Taylor Dent | 102 | 4 |
| ESP | Iván Navarro | 109 | 5 |
| USA | Jesse Levine | 110 | 6 |
| TUR | Marsel İlhan | 127 | 7 |
| AUS | Carsten Ball | 132 | 8 |

- Rankings are as of May 24, 2010.

=== Other entrants ===
The following players received wildcards into the singles main draw:

- (United Kingdom) Joshua Goodall
- (United States) Ryan Harrison
- (United Kingdom) Alexander Slabinsky
- (United Kingdom) James Ward

The following player received entry with a protected ranking:

- (France) Adrian Mannarino
- (Luxembourg) Gilles Müller

The following players received entry from the qualifying draw:

- (Germany) Simon Stadler
- (Australia) Bernard Tomic
- (United Kingdom) Alexander Ward
- (United Kingdom) Marcus Willis

== Champions ==
=== Singles ===
(Lithuania) Ričardas Berankis def. (Japan) Go Soeda, 6–4, 6–4

=== Doubles ===
(United Kingdom) Colin Fleming / (United Kingdom) Ken Skupski def. (United States) Eric Butorac / (United States) Scott Lipsky, 7–6(3), 6–4
