= 2010 BMW Open – Doubles =

Doubles
- 2010 BMW Open

Final
- Champions: (Austria) Oliver Marach (Spain) Santiago Ventura
- Runners-up: (United States) Eric Butorac (Germany) Michael Kohlmann
- Score: 5–7, 6–3, [16–14]

Events
| Singles | Doubles |
| ← 2009 · | BMW Open | · 2011 → |

Jan Hernych and Ivo Minář were the defending champions, but Hernych chose not to compete this year and Minář chose to compete in Palm Hills instead. Oliver Marach and Santiago Ventura won in the final 5–7, 6–3, [16–14], against Eric Butorac and Michael Kohlmann.

== Seeds ==
1. (United States) Bob Bryan / (United States) Mike Bryan (withdrew)
2. (Poland) Mariusz Fyrstenberg / (Poland) Marcin Matkowski (quarterfinals)
3. (United States) Eric Butorac / (Germany) Michael Kohlmann (final)
4. (Austria) Oliver Marach / (Spain) Santiago Ventura (champions)

== Draw ==
=== Key ===
- Q = Qualifier
- WC = Wild card
- LL = Lucky loser
- Alt = Alternate
- SE = Special exempt
- PR = Protected ranking
- ITF = ITF entry
- JE = Junior exempt
- w/o = Walkover
- r = Retired
- d = Defaulted
- SR = Special ranking

=== Draw ===
First round
ALT | (Spain) N Almagro (Spain) P Riba | 4 | 7^{10} | [2]
(Czech Republic) L Friedl (Czech Republic) D Škoch | 6 | 6^{8} | [10]
(Croatia) M Ančić (Austria) J Knowle | 6 | 5 | [10]
WC | (Germany) P Kohlschreiber (Germany) K Krawietz | 2 | 7 | [8]
4 | (Austria) O Marach (Spain) S Ventura | 5 | 6 | [10]
(Germany) P Marx (Slovakia) I Zelenay | 7 | 3 | [6]
WC | (Germany) A Beck (Germany) N Kiefer | 4 | 6^{6}
(France) J Chardy (France) S Robert | 6 | 7^{8}
(Switzerland) M Chiudinelli (Czech Republic) J Hájek | 6 | 6
(Uzbekistan) D Istomin (Italy) A Motti | 3 | 3
(South Africa) J Coetzee (Belgium) K Vliegen | 3 | 6 | [11]
3 | (United States) E Butorac (Germany) M Kohlmann | 6 | 3 | [13]
(Germany) C Kas (Germany) P Petzschner | 7^{7} | 7^{9}
(United States) S Lipsky (United States) D Martin | 6^{3} | 6^{7}
(Ukraine) O Dolgopolov Jr. (Germany) S Greul | 1 | 2
2 | (Poland) M Fyrstenberg (Poland) M Matkowski | 6 | 6

Quarterfinals
(Czech Republic) L Friedl (Czech Republic) D Škoch | 4 | 4
(Croatia) M Ančić (Austria) J Knowle | 6 | 6
4 | (Austria) O Marach (Spain) S Ventura | 6 | 6
(France) J Chardy (France) S Robert | 3 | 4
(Switzerland) M Chiudinelli (Czech Republic) J Hájek | 6^{4} | 2
3 | (United States) E Butorac (Germany) M Kohlmann | 7^{7} | 6
(Germany) C Kas (Germany) P Petzschner | 6 | 4 | [12]
2 | (Poland) M Fyrstenberg (Poland) M Matkowski | 1 | 6 | [10]

Semifinals
(Croatia) M Ančić (Austria) J Knowle | 6^{4} | 6 | [5]
4 | (Austria) O Marach (Spain) S Ventura | 7^{7} | 3 | [10]
3 | (United States) E Butorac (Germany) M Kohlmann | 6 | 7^{7}
(Germany) C Kas (Germany) P Petzschner | 1 | 6^{3}

Finals
4 | (Austria) O Marach (Spain) S Ventura | 5 | 6 | [16]
3 | (United States) E Butorac (Germany) M Kohlmann | 7 | 3 | [14]
