= 2010 Aegon Trophy – Men's singles =

Men's singles
- 2010 Aegon Trophy

Final
- Champion: (Lithuania) Ričardas Berankis
- Runner-up: (Japan) Go Soeda
- Score: 6–4, 6–4

Events
Singles	men	women
Doubles	men	women
- Aegon Trophy

Brendan Evans was the defending champion, but he failed to qualify for the event.
Ričardas Berankis won in the final 6–4, 6–4, against Go Soeda.

== Seeds ==
1. (France) Arnaud Clément (first round)
2. (United States) Rajeev Ram (first round)
3. (South Africa) Kevin Anderson (second round)
4. (United States) Taylor Dent (second round)
5. (Spain) Iván Navarro (first round)
6. (United States) Jesse Levine (second round)
7. (Turkey) Marsel İlhan (quarterfinals)
8. (Australia) Carsten Ball (first round)

== Draw ==
Key

- Q = Qualifier
- WC = Wild card
- LL = Lucky loser
- Alt = Alternate
- ITF = ITF entry
- PR = Protected ranking
- SR = Special ranking
- SE = Special exempt
- JE = Junior exempt
- JR = Junior Accelerator Programme entrant
- CO = College Accelerator Programme entrant
- NG = Next Gen Accelerator Program entrant
- w/o = Walkover
- r = Retired
- d = Defaulted

=== Finals ===
Semifinals
PR	(France) Adrian Mannarino	6	3	4
(Lithuania) Ričardas Berankis	3	6	6
(Germany) Andre Begemann	3	4
(Japan) Go Soeda	6	6

Final
(Lithuania) Ričardas Berankis	6	6
(Japan) Go Soeda	4	4

=== Top half ===
First round
1	(France) A Clément	5	6^{6}
(Australia) M Ebden	7	7
Q	(Germany) S Stadler	6	6
(Australia) G Jones	2	2
WC	(United Kingdom) A Slabinsky	2	6	2
PR	(France) A Mannarino	6	3	6
(Belgium) N Desein	1	6^{4}
6	(United States) J Levine	6	7
3	(South Africa) K Anderson	7	6
Q	(Australia) B Tomic	6^{8}	1
(Canada) F Dancevic	5	6^{4}
(Lithuania) R Berankis	7	7
WC	(United Kingdom) J Ward	6	6
WC	(United Kingdom) J Goodall	4	4
WC	(United States) R Harrison	4	6	6
8	(Australia) C Ball	6	1	4

Second round
(Australia) M Ebden	3	4
Q	(Germany) S Stadler	6	6
PR	(France) A Mannarino	7	6
6	(United States) J Levine	6^{5}	4
3	(South Africa) K Anderson	5	4
(Lithuania) R Berankis	7	6
WC	(United Kingdom) J Ward	3	3
WC	(United States) R Harrison	6	6

Quarterfinals
Q	(Germany) S Stadler	2	4
PR	(France) A Mannarino	6	6
(Lithuania) R Berankis	6	6
WC	(United States) R Harrison	2	2

Semifinals
PR	(France) A Mannarino	6	3	4
(Lithuania) R Berankis	3	6	6

=== Bottom half ===
First round
5	(Spain) I Navarro	5	4
(Serbia) I Bozoljac	7	6
(Japan) Y Sugita	1	3
(Germany) A Begemann	6	6
(United States) R DeHeart	5	6	5
Q	(United Kingdom) A Ward	7	2	7
(Belgium) R Bemelmans	3	4
4	(United States) T Dent	6	6
7	(Turkey) M İlhan	6	7
Q	(United Kingdom) M Willis	1	6^{3}
(Russia) D Tursunov	6	6^{5}	6
PR	(Luxembourg) G Müller	3	7	3
(Japan) G Soeda	7	6
(Australia) C Guccione	6^{4}	2
(United Kingdom) A Bogdanovic	6^{4}	6	7
2	(United States) R Ram	7	4	5

Second round
(Serbia) I Bozoljac	4	7	5
(Germany) A Begemann	6	6^{2}	7
Q	(United Kingdom) A Ward	7	0	7
4	(United States) T Dent	5	6	6^{8}
7	(Turkey) M İlhan	7	2	6
(Russia) D Tursunov	6^{11}	6	4
(Japan) G Soeda	6	1	6
(United Kingdom) A Bogdanovic	4	6	4

Quarterfinals
(Germany) A Begemann	6	6^{5}	6
Q	(United Kingdom) A Ward	2	7	3
7	(Turkey) M İlhan	4	6^{1}
(Japan) G Soeda	6	7

Semifinals
(Germany) A Begemann	3	4
(Japan) G Soeda	6	6
