= 2011 BMW Open – Singles =

Singles
- 2011 BMW Open

Final
- Champion: (Russia) Nikolay Davydenko
- Runner-up: (Germany) Florian Mayer
- Score: 6–3, 3–6, 6–1

Details
- Draw: 32 (4 Q / 2 WC )
- Seeds: 8

Events
Singles	Doubles
← 2010 ·	BMW Open	· 2012 →

Mikhail Youzhny was the defending champion, but lost to Philipp Petzschner in the second round.
7th seed Nikolay Davydenko defeated 5th seed Florian Mayer in the final 6–3, 3–6, 6–1 to win the title. It was Davydenko's first title since January 2010, and his 21st career title.

== Seeds ==
1. (Russia) Mikhail Youzhny (second round)
2. (Switzerland) Stanislas Wawrinka (first round)
3. (Croatia) Marin Čilić (quarterfinals)
4. (Cyprus) Marcos Baghdatis (second round)
5. (Germany) Florian Mayer (final)
6. (Ukraine) Sergiy Stakhovsky (second round)
7. (Russia) Nikolay Davydenko (champion)
8. (Germany) Philipp Kohlschreiber (quarterfinals)

== Draw ==
=== Key ===
- Q = Qualifier
- WC = Wild card
- LL = Lucky loser
- Alt = Alternate
- SE = Special exempt
- PR = Protected ranking
- ITF = ITF entry
- JE = Junior exempt
- w/o = Walkover
- r = Retired
- d = Defaulted
- SR = Special ranking

=== Finals ===
Semifinals
(Germany) Philipp Petzschner	3	4
5	(Germany) Florian Mayer	6	6
7	(Russia) Nikolay Davydenko	6	4
(Czech Republic) Radek Štěpánek	3	0^{r}

Final
5	(Germany) Florian Mayer	3	6	1
7	(Russia) Nikolay Davydenko	6	3	6

=== Top half ===
First round
1	(Russia) M Youzhny	7	6
(Germany) M Bachinger	5	2
(Croatia) I Dodig	1	4
(Germany) P Petzschner	6	6
(Czech Republic) J Hájek	6	4	0
(Italy) P Starace	3	6	6
(Uzbekistan) D Istomin	1^{r}
6	(Ukraine) S Stakhovsky	5
4	(Cyprus) M Baghdatis	7	6
(France) J Benneteau	6^{2}	3
(Bulgaria) G Dimitrov	6	6
WC	(Germany) A Beck	1	4
(Russia) T Gabashvili	3	6	6
(Germany) R Schüttler	6	4	3
Q	(Belgium) S Darcis	1	2
5	(Germany) F Mayer	6	6

Second round
1	(Russia) M Youzhny	6^{5}	6	2
(Germany) P Petzschner	7	3	6
(Italy) P Starace	6	6
6	(Ukraine) S Stakhovsky	4	2
4	(Cyprus) M Baghdatis	6	6^{6}	2
(Bulgaria) G Dimitrov	3	7	6
(Russia) T Gabashvili	4	6^{1}
5	(Germany) F Mayer	6	7

Quarterfinals
(Germany) P Petzschner	7	7
(Italy) P Starace	6^{3}	6^{6}
(Bulgaria) G Dimitrov	6^{4}	6	4
5	(Germany) F Mayer	7	3	6

Semifinals
(Germany) P Petzschner	3	4
5	(Germany) F Mayer	6	6

=== Bottom half ===
First round
7	(Russia) N Davydenko	6	7
Q	(Russia) A Kuznetsov	1	6^{4}
Q	(Germany) J Reister	7	6
(Germany) D Brands	6^{1}	1
(United States) R Kendrick	4	4
(Argentina) H Zeballos	6	6
(Italy) S Bolelli	5	6^{4}
3	(Croatia) M Čilić	7	7
8	(Germany) P Kohlschreiber	6	6
Q	(Colombia) R Farah	3	1
(Netherlands) R Haase	4	6	4
LL	(Germany) D Gremelmayr	6	4	6
(Czech Republic) R Štěpánek	6	4	6
(Kazakhstan) A Golubev	1	6	3
WC	(Germany) D Brown	6^{6}	6	7
2	(Switzerland) S Wawrinka	7	4	5

Second round
7	(Russia) N Davydenko	3	7	6
Q	(Germany) J Reister	6	6^{5}	1
(Argentina) H Zeballos	3	6^{7}
3	(Croatia) M Čilić	6	7
8	(Germany) P Kohlschreiber	6	6
LL	(Germany) D Gremelmayr	3	3
(Czech Republic) R Štěpánek	7	6^{5}	6
WC	(Germany) D Brown	6^{6}	7	3

Quarterfinals
7	(Russia) N Davydenko	7	6
3	(Croatia) M Čilić	5	3
8	(Germany) P Kohlschreiber	4	0
(Czech Republic) R Štěpánek	6	6

Semifinals
7	(Russia) N Davydenko	6	4
(Czech Republic) R Štěpánek	3	0^{r}
