= 2008 BMW Open =

- Date: 28 April – 4 May
- Edition: 93rd
- Category: International Series
- Draw: 32S / 16D
- Prize money: € 349,000
- Surface: Clay / outdoor
- Location: Munich, Germany
- Venue: MTTC Iphitosh

Champions

Singles
- (Chile) Fernando González

Doubles
- (Germany) Michael Berrer / (Germany) Rainer Schüttler
← 2007 ·	BMW Open	· 2009 →

The 2008 BMW Open was a men's tennis tournament played on outdoor clay courts. It was the 93rd edition of the BMW Open, and was part of the International Series of the 2008 ATP Tour. It took place in Munich, Germany, from 28 April through 4 May 2008.

The announced draw was led by Marseille semifinalist Paul-Henri Mathieu, Viña del Mar champion Fernando González, Auckland winner and BMW Open defending champion Philipp Kohlschreiber. Other top seeds were Miami and Monte Carlo Masters quarterfinalist Igor Andreev, Indian Wells Masters quarterfinalist Tommy Haas, Andreas Seppi, Steve Darcis and Marin Čilić.

== Finals ==
=== Singles ===
(Chile) Fernando González defeated (Italy) Simone Bolelli, 7–6^{(7–4)}, 6–7^{(4–7)}, 6–3

- It was Fernando González's 2nd title of the year, and his 10th overall.

=== Doubles ===
(Germany) Michael Berrer / (Germany) Rainer Schüttler defeated (United States) Scott Lipsky / (United States) David Martin, 7–5, 3–6, [10–8]
