= 2008 BMW Open – Singles =

Singles
- 2008 BMW Open

Final
- Champion: (Chile) Fernando González
- Runner-up: (Italy) Simone Bolelli
- Score: 7–6^{(7–4)}, 6–7^{(4–7)}, 6–3

Details
- Draw: 32 (4 Q / 3 WC )
- Seeds: 8

Events
Singles	Doubles
← 2007 ·	BMW Open	· 2009 →

Philipp Kohlschreiber was the defending champion, but was forced to withdraw due to illness.

Fernando González won in the final 7–6^{(7–4)}, 6–7^{(4–7)}, 6–3, against Simone Bolelli.

== Seeds ==
1. (France) Paul-Henri Mathieu (semifinals)
2. (Chile) Fernando González (champion)
3. (Germany) Philipp Kohlschreiber (withdrew due to illness)
4. (Russia) Igor Andreev (second round)
5. (Germany) Tommy Haas (withdrew due to a shoulder injury)
6. (Italy) Andreas Seppi (second round)
7. (Belgium) Steve Darcis (second round)
8. (Croatia) Marin Čilić (quarterfinals)

== Draw ==
=== Key ===
- Q = Qualifier
- WC = Wild card
- LL = Lucky loser
- Alt = Alternate
- ITF = ITF entry
- PR = Protected ranking
- SR = Special ranking
- SE = Special exempt
- JE = Junior exempt
- JR = Junior Accelerator Programme entrant
- CO = College Accelerator Programme entrant
- NG = Next Gen Accelerator Program entrant
- w/o = Walkover
- r = Retired
- d = Defaulted

=== Finals ===
Semifinals
1	(France) Paul-Henri Mathieu	6^{1}	6	6^{4}
(Italy) Simone Bolelli	7^{7}	4	7^{7}
Q	(Morocco) Younes El Aynaoui	6	4	3
2	(Chile) Fernando González	3	6	6

Final
(Italy) Simone Bolelli	6^{4}	7^{7}	3
2	(Chile) Fernando González	7^{7}	6^{4}	6

=== Top half ===
First round
1	(France) P-H Mathieu	6	6
WC	(Germany) D Brands	3	3
(Germany) R Schüttler	7^{7}	3	4
Q	(Italy) G Naso	6^{2}	6	6
(Russia) E Korolev	4	6	2
(Germany) P Petzschner	6	0	6
(Belgium) O Rochus	4	4
8	(Croatia) M Čilić	6	6
LL	(Brazil) J Silva	3	6	6
WC	(Germany) M Bachinger	6	2	3
Q	(Austria) R Eitzinger	6	5	2
(South Korea) H-t Lee	1	7	6
(France) M Gicquel	4	2
(Italy) S Bolelli	6	6
(Croatia) R Karanušić	3	3
6	(Italy) A Seppi	6	6

Second round
1	(France) P-H Mathieu	6	6
Q	(Italy) G Naso	3	4
(Germany) P Petzschner	4	6^{7}
8	(Croatia) M Čilić	6	7^{9}
LL	(Brazil) J Silva	1	4
(South Korea) H-t Lee	6	6
(Italy) S Bolelli	6	7
6	(Italy) A Seppi	4	5

Quarterfinals
1	(France) P-H Mathieu	6	4	6
8	(Croatia) M Čilić	2	6	3
(South Korea) H-t Lee	4	6^{3}
(Italy) S Bolelli	6	7^{7}

Semifinals
1	(France) P-H Mathieu	6^{1}	6	6^{4}
(Italy) S Bolelli	7^{7}	4	7^{7}

=== Bottom half ===
First round
7	(Belgium) S Darcis	6	6
(Germany) B Becker	3	4
Q	(France) A Sidorenko	4	6^{6}
Q	(Morocco) Y El Aynaoui	6	7^{8}
(France) A Clément	3	1
(Argentina) JM del Potro	6	6
(France) G Monfils	3	4
4	(Russia) I Andreev	6	6
LL	(Slovakia) I Klec	1	6^{6}
(Germany) M Berrer	6	7^{8}
WC	(Russia) M Safin	6	3	6
(Argentina) C Berlocq	3	6	4
(Belgium) K Vliegen	7^{7}	6
(Argentina) S Roitman	6^{3}	3
(Israel) D Sela	3	4
2	(Chile) F González	6	6

Second round
7	(Belgium) S Darcis	4	6	3
Q	(Morocco) Y El Aynaoui	6	3	6
(Argentina) JM del Potro	1	6	6
4	(Russia) I Andreev	6	0	4
(Germany) M Berrer	6^{4}	7^{7}	3
WC	(Russia) M Safin	7^{7}	6^{5}	6
(Belgium) K Vliegen	6	5	3
2	(Chile) F González	1	7	6

Quarterfinals
Q	(Morocco) Y El Aynaoui	6	6
(Argentina) JM del Potro	4	4
WC	(Russia) M Safin	3	5
2	(Chile) F González	6	7

Semifinals
Q	(Morocco) Y El Aynaoui	6	4	3
2	(Chile) F González	3	6	6
