= 2008 Nottingham Open – Doubles =

Doubles
- 2008 Nottingham Open

Final
- Champions: (Brazil) Bruno Soares (Zimbabwe) Kevin Ullyett
- Runners-up: (South Africa) Jeff Coetzee (United Kingdom) Jamie Murray
- Score: 6–2, 7–6^{(7–5)}

Events
Singles	Doubles
- Nottingham Open

Eric Butorac and Jamie Murray were the defending champions. They were both present but did not compete together.
Butorac partnered with Bobby Reynolds, but lost in the first round to Murray and partner Jeff Coetzee.
Murray partnered with Jeff Coetzee, but Bruno Soares and Kevin Ullyett defeated them 6–2, 7–6^{(7–5)}, in the final.

== Seeds ==
1. (Israel) Jonathan Erlich / (Israel) Andy Ram (first round)
2. (South Africa) Jeff Coetzee / (United Kingdom) Jamie Murray (final)
3. (Brazil) Marcelo Melo / (Brazil) André Sá (semifinals)
4. (Brazil) Bruno Soares / (Zimbabwe) Kevin Ullyett (champions)

== Draw ==
Key

- Q = Qualifier
- WC = Wild card
- LL = Lucky loser
- Alt = Alternate
- ITF = ITF entry
- PR = Protected ranking
- SR = Special ranking
- SE = Special exempt
- JE = Junior exempt
- JR = Junior Accelerator Programme entrant
- CO = College Accelerator Programme entrant
- NG = Next Gen Accelerator Program entrant
- w/o = Walkover
- r = Retired
- d = Defaulted

=== Draw ===
First round
1	(Israel) J Erlich (Israel) A Ram	6	4	[7]
(Australia) P Hanley (Australia) T Perry	2	6	[10]
(South Africa) C Haggard (Russia) D Tursunov	4	1^{r}
(Italy) S Bolelli (Italy) A Seppi	6	3
4	(Brazil) B Soares (Zimbabwe) K Ullyett	6	6
WC	(United Kingdom) J Auckland (United Kingdom) J Delgado	4	4
(Thailand) S Ratiwatana (Thailand) S Ratiwatana	7^{10}	3	[7]
(United States) S Lipsky (United States) D Martin	6^{8}	6	[10]
(Russia) I Kunitsyn (United States) J Thomas	6	6^{5}	[7]
(France) J Benneteau (France) N Mahut	4	7^{7}	[10]
WC	(United Kingdom) A Bogdanovic (United Kingdom) R Hutchins	4	4
3	(Brazil) M Melo (Brazil) A Sá	6	6
(Spain) G García López (Spain) F Verdasco	2	6	[10]
(France) G Monfils (France) G Simon	6	4	[4]
(United States) E Butorac (United States) B Reynolds	6^{6}	6	[8]
2	(South Africa) J Coetzee (United Kingdom) J Murray	7^{8}	4	[10]

Quarterfinals
(Australia) P Hanley (Australia) T Perry	4	7^{7}	[10]
(Italy) S Bolelli (Italy) A Seppi	6	6^{4}	[4]
4	(Brazil) B Soares (Zimbabwe) K Ullyett	7	6
(United States) S Lipsky (United States) D Martin	5	2
(France) J Benneteau (France) N Mahut	3	4
3	(Brazil) M Melo (Brazil) A Sá	6	6
(Spain) G García López (Spain) F Verdasco	4	6	[8]
2	(South Africa) J Coetzee (United Kingdom) J Murray	6	4	[10]

Semifinals
(Australia) P Hanley (Australia) T Perry	4	4
4	(Brazil) B Soares (Zimbabwe) K Ullyett	6	6
3	(Brazil) M Melo (Brazil) A Sá	4	5
2	(South Africa) J Coetzee (United Kingdom) J Murray	6	7

Final
4	(Brazil) B Soares (Zimbabwe) K Ullyett	6	7^{7}
2	(South Africa) J Coetzee (United Kingdom) J Murray	2	6^{5}
