= 2009 BMW Open – Doubles =

Doubles
- 2009 BMW Open

Final
- Champions: (Czech Republic) Jan Hernych (Czech Republic) Ivo Minář
- Runners-up: (Australia) Ashley Fisher (Australia) Jordan Kerr
- Score: 6–4, 6–4

Events
| Singles | Doubles |
| ← 2008 · | BMW Open | · 2010 → |

Michael Berrer and Rainer Schüttler were the defending champions, but chose not to participate this year.

== Seeds ==
1. (United States) Bob Bryan / (United States) Mike Bryan (first round)
2. (Australia) Ashley Fisher / (Australia) Jordan Kerr (final)
3. (Germany) Philipp Petzschner / (Austria) Alexander Peya (first round)
4. (India) Rohan Bopanna / (United States) Travis Parrott (semifinals)

== Draw ==
=== Key ===
- Q = Qualifier
- WC = Wild card
- LL = Lucky loser
- Alt = Alternate
- ITF = ITF entry
- PR = Protected ranking
- SR = Special ranking
- SE = Special exempt
- JE = Junior exempt
- JR = Junior Accelerator Programme entrant
- CO = College Accelerator Programme entrant
- NG = Next Gen Accelerator Program entrant
- w/o = Walkover
- r = Retired
- d = Defaulted

=== Draw ===
First round
1 | (United States) B Bryan (United States) M Bryan | 6 | 2 | [9]
(Czech Republic) J Hernych (Czech Republic) I Minář | 1 | 6 | [11]
WC | (Germany) M Kohlmann (Germany) A Waske | 6 | 4 | [10]
(Italy) S Bolelli (Germany) C Kas | 4 | 6 | [8]
3 | (Germany) P Petzschner (Austria) A Peya | 4 | 6 | [15]
(United Kingdom) J Murray (Czech Republic) P Vízner | 6 | 3 | [17]
ALT | (Germany) P Marx (Germany) F Moser | 6 | 3 | [1]
WC | (Germany) D Gremelmayr (Germany) D Meffert | 3 | 6 | [10]
(Germany) N Kiefer (Germany) M Zverev | 7^{7} | 6^{4} | [7]
(United States) J Cerretani (France) J Chardy | 6^{4} | 7^{7} | [10]
(Spain) N Almagro (Argentina) S Prieto | 4 | 7 | [8]
4 | (India) R Bopanna (United States) T Parrott | 6 | 5 | [10]
(Latvia) E Gulbis (Russia) I Kunitsyn | 6 | 6
(Italy) P Starace (Argentina) M Vassallo Argüello | 3 | 4
ALT | (Italy) M Crugnola (South Africa) C Haggard | 3 | 2
2 | (Australia) A Fisher (Australia) J Kerr | 6 | 6

Quarterfinals
(Czech Republic) J Hernych (Czech Republic) I Minář | 7^{7} | 6
WC | (Germany) M Kohlmann (Germany) A Waske | 6^{4} | 4
(United Kingdom) J Murray (Czech Republic) P Vízner | 5 | 2
WC | (Germany) D Gremelmayr (Germany) D Meffert | 7 | 6
(United States) J Cerretani (France) J Chardy | 4 | 4
4 | (India) R Bopanna (United States) T Parrott | 6 | 6
(Latvia) E Gulbis (Russia) I Kunitsyn | 5 | 6^{3}
2 | (Australia) A Fisher (Australia) J Kerr | 7 | 7^{7}

Semifinals
(Czech Republic) J Hernych (Czech Republic) I Minář | 6 | 6
WC | (Germany) D Gremelmayr (Germany) D Meffert | 3 | 1
4 | (India) R Bopanna (United States) T Parrott | 6^{2} | 4
2 | (Australia) A Fisher (Australia) J Kerr | 7^{7} | 6

Final
(Czech Republic) J Hernych (Czech Republic) I Minář | 6 | 6
2 | (Australia) A Fisher (Australia) J Kerr | 4 | 4
