= 2011 Aegon Trophy =

- Date: May 30 – June 5
- Edition: 3rd
- Location: Nottingham, Great Britain

Champions

Men's singles
- (Luxembourg) Gilles Müller

Women's singles
- (Greece) Eleni Daniilidou

Men's doubles
- (United Kingdom) Colin Fleming / (United Kingdom) Ross Hutchins

Women's doubles
- (Japan) Kimiko Date-Krumm / (China) Zhang Shuai
← 2010 ·	Aegon Trophy	· 2012 →

The 2011 Aegon Trophy was a professional tennis tournament played on outdoor grass courts. It was part of the 2011 ATP Challenger Tour and the 2011 ITF Women's Circuit. It took place in Nottingham, Great Britain between May 28 and June 5, 2011.

== ATP entrants ==
=== Seeds ===
Nationality	Player	Ranking*	Seeding
FRA	Adrian Mannarino	53	1
IND	Somdev Devvarman	66	2
USA	Ryan Sweeting	70	3
RUS	Dmitry Tursunov	74	4
USA	Alex Bogomolov Jr.	86	5
USA	Donald Young	96	6
GER	Matthias Bachinger	99	7
USA	Bobby Reynolds	109	8

- Rankings are as of May 23, 2011.

=== Other entrants ===
The following players received wildcards into the singles main draw:

- (United Kingdom) Daniel Cox
- (United Kingdom) Daniel Evans
- (United Kingdom) Joshua Milton
- (Australia) Bernard Tomic

The following players received entry from the qualifying draw:

- (United States) Alex Kuznetsov
- (Republic of Ireland) Conor Niland
- (Japan) Yūichi Sugita
- (United Kingdom) James Ward

== WTA entrants ==
=== Seeds ===
Nationality	Player	Ranking*	Seeding
CHN	Zhang Shuai	75	1
ITA	Romina Oprandi	85	2
AUT	Tamira Paszek	88	3
USA	Melanie Oudin	89	4
USA	Coco Vandeweghe	90	5
CRO	Mirjana Lučić	97	6
GEO	Anna Tatishvili	106	7
USA	Irina Falconi	107	8

- Rankings as of 23 May 2011

=== Other entrants ===
The following players received wildcards into the singles main draw:

- (United Kingdom) Naomi Broady
- (United Kingdom) Katie O'Brien
- (United Kingdom) Laura Robson
- (United Kingdom) Emily Webley-Smith

The following players received entry from the qualifying draw:

- (Hungary) Melinda Czink
- (Israel) Julia Glushko
- (China) Lu Jingjing
- (United Kingdom) Samantha Murray

== Champions ==
=== Men's singles ===
(Luxembourg) Gilles Müller def. (Germany) Matthias Bachinger, 7–6(4), 6–2

=== Women's singles ===
(Greece) Eleni Daniilidou def. (Belarus) Olga Govortsova, 1–6, 6–4, 6–2

=== Men's doubles ===
(United Kingdom) Colin Fleming / Ross Hutchins def. (Germany) Dustin Brown / (Germany) Martin Emmrich, 4–6, 7–6(8), [13–11]

=== Women's doubles ===
(Japan) Kimiko Date-Krumm / (China) Zhang Shuai def. (United States) Raquel Kops-Jones / (United States) Abigail Spears, 6–4, 7–6(7)
