= 2008 Nottingham Open – Singles =

Singles
- 2008 Nottingham Open

Final
- Champion: (Croatia) Ivo Karlović
- Runner-up: (Spain) Fernando Verdasco
- Score: 7–5, 6–7^{(4–7)}, 7–6^{(10–8)}

Details
- Draw: 32 (4Q / 3WC)
- Seeds: 8

Events
Singles	Doubles
- Nottingham Open

Ivo Karlović was the men's singles defending champion at the 2008 Nottingham Open, and won in the final 7–5, 6–7^{(4–7)}, 7–6^{(10–8)}, against Fernando Verdasco.

== Seeds ==
1. (Czech Republic) Radek Štěpánek (second round, withdrew due to a rib injury)
2. (France) Paul-Henri Mathieu (first round)
3. (Spain) Fernando Verdasco (final)
4. (Croatia) Ivo Karlović (champion)
5. (France) Gilles Simon (quarterfinals)
6. (Russia) Dmitry Tursunov (second round, defaulted)
7. (Italy) Andreas Seppi (quarterfinals)
8. (France) Gaël Monfils (semifinals)

== Draw ==
Key

- Q = Qualifier
- WC = Wild card
- LL = Lucky loser
- Alt = Alternate
- ITF = ITF entry
- PR = Protected ranking
- SR = Special ranking
- SE = Special exempt
- JE = Junior exempt
- JR = Junior Accelerator Programme entrant
- CO = College Accelerator Programme entrant
- NG = Next Gen Accelerator Program entrant
- w/o = Walkover
- r = Retired
- d = Defaulted

=== Finals ===
Semifinals
8	(France) Gaël Monfils	6^{4}	6^{4}
4	(Croatia) Ivo Karlović	7^{7}	7^{7}
3	(Spain) Fernando Verdasco	6	6
(Croatia) Marin Čilić	3	1

Final
4	(Croatia) Ivo Karlović	7	6^{4}	7^{10}
3	(Spain) Fernando Verdasco	5	7^{7}	6^{8}

=== Top half ===
First round
1	(Czech Republic) R Štěpánek	6	6
(United States) J Isner	3	2
Q	(United States) V Spadea	6	7
WC	(United Kingdom) A Slabinsky	1	5
(Italy) S Bolelli	1	4
(France) J Benneteau	6	6
(Australia) C Guccione	6^{4}	4
8	(France) G Monfils	7^{7}	6
4	(Croatia) I Karlović	6	6
(Sweden) J Björkman	3	4
LL	(Colombia) A Falla	3	4
(United States) S Querrey	6	6
(Argentina) E Schwank	6	6
LL	(Denmark) F Nielsen	3	3
(Israel) D Sela	6	4	5
7	(Italy) A Seppi	3	6	7

Second round
1	(Czech Republic) R Štěpánek
Q	(United States) V Spadea	w/o
(France) J Benneteau	6	4	2
8	(France) G Monfils	3	6	6
4	(Croatia) I Karlović	7^{7}	7^{16}
(United States) S Querrey	6^{3}	6^{14}
(Argentina) E Schwank	1	6	6^{7}
7	(Italy) A Seppi	6	4	7^{9}

Quarterfinals
Q	(United States) V Spadea	6^{4}	2
8	(France) G Monfils	7^{7}	6
4	(Croatia) I Karlović	6	3	6
7	(Italy) A Seppi	3	6	4

Semifinals
8	(France) G Monfils	6^{4}	6^{4}
4	(Croatia) I Karlović	7^{7}	7^{7}

=== Bottom half ===
First round
5	(France) G Simon	6	6
(United States) D Young	1	4
WC	(United Kingdom) J Baker	6^{7}	3
Q	(Australia) S Groth	7^{9}	6
(United States) B Reynolds	7	4	6
(France) N Mahut	5	6	4
(Brazil) M Daniel	4	6^{3}
3	(Spain) F Verdasco	6	7^{7}
6	(Russia) D Tursunov	7	6
(Chinese Taipei) Y-h Lu	5	4
Q	(Japan) K Nishikori	5	r
(Sweden) T Johansson	7
Q	(United Kingdom) A Bogdanovic	6	6
WC	(United Kingdom) J Ward	3	4
(Croatia) M Čilić	1	6	6
2	(France) P-H Mathieu	6	4	3

Second round
5	(France) G Simon	6^{1}	6	6
Q	(Australia) S Groth	7^{7}	4	4
(United States) B Reynolds	2	3
3	(Spain) F Verdasco	6	6
6	(Russia) D Tursunov
(Sweden) T Johansson	w/o
Q	(United Kingdom) A Bogdanovic	4	4
(Croatia) M Čilić	6	6

Quarterfinals
5	(France) G Simon	3	6	3
3	(Spain) F Verdasco	6	2	6
(Sweden) T Johansson	1	2
(Croatia) M Čilić	6	6

Semifinals
3	(Spain) F Verdasco	6	6
(Croatia) M Čilić	3	1
