= 2007 BMW Open – Singles =

Singles
- 2007 BMW Open

Final
- Champion: (Germany) Philipp Kohlschreiber
- Runner-up: (Russia) Mikhail Youzhny
- Score: 2–6, 6–3, 6–4

Details
- Draw: 32 (4 Q / 3 WC )
- Seeds: 8

Events
Singles	Doubles
- BMW Open

Philipp Kohlschreiber defeated Mikhail Youzhny 2–6, 6–3, 6–4 to win the 2007 BMW Open singles event.

== Seeds ==
1. (Germany) Tommy Haas (first round)
2. (Czech Republic) Tomáš Berdych (semifinals)
3. (Russia) Mikhail Youzhny (finalist)
4. (Cyprus) Marcos Baghdatis (semifinals)
5. (Finland) Jarkko Nieminen (second round)
6. (Czech Republic) Radek Štěpánek (first round)
7. (Argentina) Guillermo Cañas (first round, retired because of a stomach injury)
8. (Austria) Jürgen Melzer (quarterfinals)

== Draw ==
Key

- Q = Qualifier
- WC = Wild card
- LL = Lucky loser
- Alt = Alternate
- ITF = ITF entry
- PR = Protected ranking
- SR = Special ranking
- SE = Special exempt
- JE = Junior exempt
- JR = Junior Accelerator Programme entrant
- CO = College Accelerator Programme entrant
- NG = Next Gen Accelerator Program entrant
- w/o = Walkover
- r = Retired
- d = Defaulted

=== Finals ===
Semifinals
(Germany) Philipp Kohlschreiber	6	6
4	(Cyprus) Marcos Baghdatis	2	3
3	(Russia) Mikhail Youzhny	6	6
2	(Czech Republic) Tomáš Berdych	4	3

Final
(Germany) Philipp Kohlschreiber	2	6	6
3	(Russia) Mikhail Youzhny	6	3	4

=== Section 1 ===
First round
1	(Germany) T Haas	4	4
(France) S Grosjean	6	6
(South Korea) L Hyung-Taik	6^{5}	4
(Argentina) M Vassallo Argüello	7^{7}	6
(France) A Clément	2	6^{5}
(Germany) P Kohlschreiber	6	7^{7}
WC	(Germany) R Schüttler	4	4
5	(Finland) J Nieminen	6	6
4	(Cyprus) M Baghdatis	7^{7}	6
(Argentina) D Hartfield	6^{5}	3
Q	(Germany) A Beck	2	7^{7}	5
Q	(Germany) M Bachinger	6	6^{5}	7
PR	(Netherlands) M Verkerk	6^{4}	3
WC	(Germany) D Brands	7^{7}	6
WC	(Germany) A Waske	7^{7}	6
6	(Czech Republic) R Štěpánek	6^{3}	3

Second round
(France) S Grosjean	2	6	6
(Argentina) M Vassallo Argüello	6	3	4
(Germany) P Kohlschreiber	6	6
5	(Finland) J Nieminen	1	4
4	(Cyprus) M Baghdatis	6^{7}	6	6
Q	(Germany) M Bachinger	7^{9}	2	4
WC	(Germany) D Brands	6^{5}	6^{5}
WC	(Germany) A Waske	7^{7}	7^{7}

Quarterfinals
(France) S Grosjean	4	6^{5}
(Germany) P Kohlschreiber	6	7^{7}
4	(Cyprus) M Baghdatis	2	7^{7}	6
WC	(Germany) A Waske	6	6^{5}	4

Semifinals
(Germany) P Kohlschreiber	6	6
4	(Cyprus) M Baghdatis	2	3

=== Section 2 ===
First round
8	(Austria) J Melzer	6	6
(Belgium) O Rochus	2	4
(Czech Republic) J Hájek	6	2	6^{5}
LL	(Netherlands) R Sluiter	3	6	7^{7}
(Germany) B Becker	7^{8}	6
Q	(Serbia) N Zimonjić	6^{6}	3
(Austria) S Koubek	4	6	1
3	(Russia) M Youzhny	6	3	6
7	(Argentina) G Cañas	6	1^{r}
(France) N Devilder	4	2
Q	(Germany) T Summerer	5	6	6
(Latvia) E Gulbis	7	4	4
(Sweden) T Johansson	2	1
(Chile) N Massú	6	6
(Germany) F Mayer	2	1
2	(Czech Republic) T Berdych	6	6

Second round
8	(Austria) J Melzer	5	6	6
LL	(Netherlands) R Sluiter	7	1	2
(Germany) B Becker	6^{4}	6^{3}
3	(Russia) M Youzhny	7^{7}	7^{7}
(France) N Devilder	6	7
Q	(Germany) T Summerer	3	5
(Chile) N Massú	5	1
2	(Czech Republic) T Berdych	7	6

Quarterfinals
8	(Austria) J Melzer	2	6^{5}
3	(Russia) M Youzhny	6	7^{7}
(France) N Devilder	4	0
2	(Czech Republic) T Berdych	6	6

Semifinals
3	(Russia) M Youzhny	6	6
2	(Czech Republic) T Berdych	4	3
