= Sascha Klör =

German tennis player

- ITF name: Sascha Kloer
- Country (sports): Germany
- Born: 16 August 1985 (age 39); Krefeld, Germany
- Plays: Right-handed (two-handed backhand)
- Prize money: $37,662

Singles
- Career record: 0–1 (at ATP Tour level, Grand Slam level, and in Davis Cup)
- Career titles: 2 ITF
- Highest ranking: No. 375 (19 June 2006)

Doubles
- Career record: 0–0 (at ATP Tour level, Grand Slam level, and in Davis Cup)
- Career titles: 3 ITF
- Highest ranking: No. 578 (12 December 2005)
- Last updated on: 15 July 2019.

Sascha Klör (born 16 August 1985) is a retired German tennis player.

Klör has a career high ATP singles ranking of 375 achieved on 19 June 2006. He also has a career high ATP doubles ranking of 578 achieved on 12 December 2005.

Klör made his ATP main draw debut at the 2009 BMW Open after qualifying for the singles main draw. He was defeated by eventual champion Tomáš Berdych in the first round.
