= 2011 BMW Open =

- Date: 23 April – 1 May
- Edition: 96th
- Category: World Tour 250
- Surface: Clay / outdoor
- Location: Munich, Germany
- Venue: MTTC Iphitos

Champions

Singles
- (Russia) Nikolay Davydenko

Doubles
- (Italy) Simone Bolelli / (Argentina) Horacio Zeballos
- BMW Open

The 2011 BMW Open, also known as The BMW Open by FWU Takaful 2011 for sponsorship reasons, was a men's tennis tournament played on outdoor clay courts. It was the 96th edition of the event. It was part of the ATP World Tour 250 series of the 2011 ATP World Tour. It took place at the MTTC Iphitos complex in Munich, Germany, from 23 April through 1 May 2011. Mikhail Youzhny was the defending champion, while he was joined by last year's finalist Marin Čilić as well as semifinalists Marcos Baghdatis and Philipp Petzschner. Unranked former world number two countryman Tommy Haas made his 2011 debut and returned to playing in doubles via a wildcard into the main draw with partner Radek Štěpánek.

== Entrants ==
=== Seeds ===
Country	Player	Rank^{1}	Seed
RUS	Mikhail Youzhny	14	1
SUI	Stanislas Wawrinka	15	2
CRO	Marin Čilić	21	3
CYP	Marcos Baghdatis	25	4
GER	Florian Mayer	34	5
UKR	Sergiy Stakhovsky	38	6
RUS	Nikolay Davydenko	39	7
GER	Philipp Kohlschreiber	41	8

- Seedings are based on the rankings of April 18, 2011.

=== Other entrants ===
The following players received wildcards into the main draw:

- (Germany) Matthias Bachinger
- (Germany) Andreas Beck
- (Germany) Dustin Brown

The following players received entry from the qualifying draw:

- (Belgium) Steve Darcis
- (Colombia) Robert Farah
- (Russia) Andrey Kuznetsov
- (Germany) Julian Reister

The following player received entry from a Lucky loser spot:

- (Germany) Denis Gremelmayr

=== Notable withdrawals ===
- (Finland) Jarkko Nieminen

== Finals ==
=== Singles ===
(Russia) Nikolay Davydenko defeated (Germany) Florian Mayer, 6–3, 3–6, 6–1

- It was Davydenko's 1st title of the year and 21st of his career. It was his 2nd win in Munich, also winning in 2004.

=== Doubles ===
(Italy) Simone Bolelli / (Argentina) Horacio Zeballos defeated (Germany) Andreas Beck / (Germany) Christopher Kas, 7–6(3), 6–4
