= Eric Butorac =

American tennis player (born 1981)

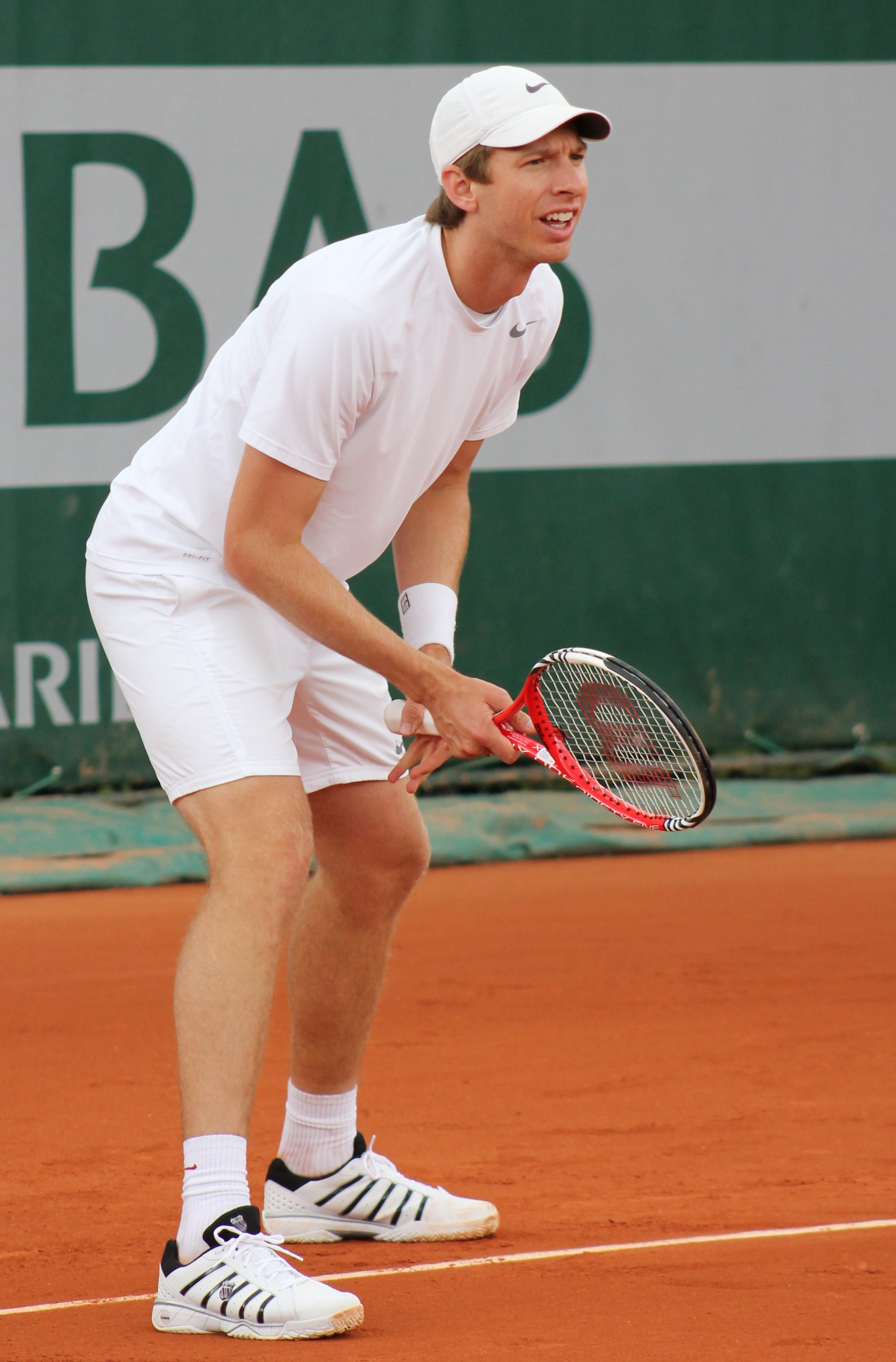
- Butorac at the 2013 French Open
- Country (sports): United States
- Residence: Cambridge, Massachusetts, U.S.
- Born: May 22, 1981 (age 45) Rochester, Minnesota, U.S.
- Height: 6 ft 3 in (1.91 m)
- Turned pro: 2003
- Retired: 2016
- Plays: Left-handed (two-handed backhand)
- College: Ball State Cardinals; Gustavus Adolphus College
- Prize money: $1,728,454

Singles
- Career record: 0–0
- Career titles: 0
- Highest ranking: No. 935 (January 16, 2006)

Doubles
- Career record: 269–242 (in ATP Tour and Grand Slam main draw matches, and in Davis Cup)
- Career titles: 18
- Highest ranking: No. 17 (August 29, 2011)

Grand Slam doubles results
- Australian Open: F (2014)
- French Open: 3R (2012, 2016)
- Wimbledon: 3R (2007, 2014)
- US Open: QF (2014)

Grand Slam mixed doubles results
- Australian Open: 1R (2011, 2012, 2015)
- French Open: SF (2014)
- Wimbledon: 3R (2013, 2014)
- US Open: 2R (2016)
- Last updated on: December 13, 2016.

Eric Butorac (born May 22, 1981), nicknamed Booty, is an American retired professional tennis player. He was a doubles specialist, and for a period of approximately six years was the No. 3 ranked American doubles player. His best result was reaching the 2014 Australian Open finals with partner Raven Klaasen. Their run to the final included a victory over the World No. 1 team of Bob and Mike Bryan.

He attended Ball State University in Muncie, Indiana, where he played on the men's tennis team for one year before transferring to Gustavus Adolphus College in St. Peter, Minnesota, where he graduated in 2003.

== Early life ==
Butorac is of Croatian descent. Butorac's parents, Jan and Tim Butorac, are directors of the Rochester Tennis Connection (Indoor & Outdoor site) in Rochester, Minnesota. His brother, Jeff, is a basketball coach at Century High School. Tim Butorac is a USPTA professional, teaching tennis at the Rochester Indoor Tennis Club during the winter and at the Kutzky/Rochester Outdoor Tennis Center during the summer months.

== Career ==
=== College career ===
Eric Butorac played at Ball State University for one year before transferring to Gustavus Adolphus College. He has a long history with Gustavus: his father played for coach Steve Wilkinson, and, at age five, Eric attended tennis camp with Wilkinson. He closed out his senior season of 2003 by winning both the NCAA Division III singles and doubles championships, with Kevin Whipple as his partner.

=== Professional career ===
In July 2006, Butorac and Jamie Murray reached their first ATP Tour doubles final, in Los Angeles, losing in straight sets to the Bryan brothers, who were the world's top-ranked doubles team.

In early February 2007, the US-Scots pair claimed their first doubles title in a Challenger event in Dallas, and a week later they won their first ATP title at the SAP Open. They continued their winning run the following week when the unseeded pair defeated second seeds Julian Knowle and Jürgen Melzer, 7–5, 6–3, to capture the doubles title of the Regions Morgan Keegan Championships at the Racquet Club of Memphis.

In April, May, and June 2009, Butorac and American Scott Lipsky won the Tallahassee Tennis Challenger, the Estoril Open in Portugal, and a tournament in Nottingham, England.

In 2010, Butorac paired with Rajeev Ram to make the quarterfinals of the Australian Open. He also won titles in Chennai (with Ram), Tokyo and Stockholm (with Rojer). He was on the 2010 roster of the Boston Lobsters in the World Team Tennis pro league.

In 2011, Butorac had his best season reaching a career-high ranking of no. 17, and finishing as the no. 9 team in the world with partner Jean-Julien Rojer of the Netherlands. They won three titles and made the semifinals of the Australian Open.

In 2012, Butorac made the quarterfinals of the Australian Open and won the doubles title in São Paulo (with Bruno Soares).

In 2013, Butorac made it to the Round of 16 at the Australian Open and won the doubles title in Kuala Lumpur with Raven Klaasen.

In 2014, Butorac started his year with reaching the final of the Australian Open. He then went on to win titles in Memphis and Stockholm. All of these were with partner Raven Klaasen.

=== Off court ===
Butorac was elected to the ATP Player Council in 2008. He became vice president starting in 2012, then was elected president in 2014, succeeding Roger Federer. He was later succeeded as president by Novak Djokovic on August 30, 2016.

In 2022, Butorac served as tournament director of the Cincinnati Open. In November 2025, he was announced as the US Open's new tournament director, replacing Stacey Allaster.

== Major finals ==
=== Grand Slam finals ===
==== Doubles: 1 (runner-up) ====
Outcome	Year	Championship	Surface	Partner	Opponents	Score
Loss	2014	Australian Open	Hard	(South Africa) Raven Klaasen	(Poland) Łukasz Kubot (Sweden) Robert Lindstedt	3–6, 3–6

== ATP career finals ==
=== Doubles: 29 (18 titles, 11 runners-up) ===
Legend ( Doubles) Grand Slam tournaments (0–1) ATP World Tour Finals (0–0) ATP World Tour Masters 1000 (0–0) ATP World Tour 500 Series (2–2) ATP World Tour 250 Series (16–8)	Titles by surface Hard (12–9) Clay (5–2) Grass (1–0) Carpet (0–0)

Result	W–L	Date	Tournament	Tier	Surface	Partner	Opponents	Score
Loss	0–1	Jul 2006	Los Angeles Open, United States	International	Hard	(United Kingdom) Jamie Murray	(United States) Bob Bryan (United States) Mike Bryan	2–6, 4–6
Win	1–1	Feb 2007	Pacific Coast Championships, United States	International	Hard (i)	(United Kingdom) Jamie Murray	(South Africa) Chris Haggard (Germany) Rainer Schüttler	7–5, 7–6^{(8–6)}
Win	2–1	Feb 2007	U.S. National Indoor Tennis Championships, United States	Intl. Gold	Hard (i)	(United Kingdom) Jamie Murray	(Austria) Jürgen Melzer (Austria) Julian Knowle	7–5, 6–3
Win	3–1	Jun 2007	Nottingham Open, United Kingdom	International	Grass	(United Kingdom) Jamie Murray	(United Kingdom) Joshua Goodall (United Kingdom) Ross Hutchins	4–6, 6–3, [10–5]
Win	4–1	Aug 2008	Los Angeles Open, United States	International	Hard	(India) Rohan Bopanna	(United States) Travis Parrott (Serbia) Dušan Vemić	7–6^{(7–5)}, 7–6^{(7–5)}
Win	5–1	Jan 2009	Chennai Open, India	250 Series	Hard	(United States) Rajeev Ram	(Switzerland) Jean-Claude Scherrer (Switzerland) Stan Wawrinka	6–3, 6–4
Win	6–1	May 2009	Estoril Open, Portugal	250 Series	Clay	(United States) Scott Lipsky	(Czech Republic) Martin Damm (Sweden) Robert Lindstedt	6–3, 6–2
Win	7–1	Oct 2009	Thailand Open, Thailand	250 Series	Hard (i)	(United States) Rajeev Ram	(Spain) Guillermo García López (Germany) Mischa Zverev	7–6^{(7–4)}, 6–3
Loss	7–2	May 2010	Bavarian International Tennis Championships, Germany	250 Series	Clay	(Germany) Michael Kohlmann	(Austria) Oliver Marach (Spain) Santiago Ventura	7–5, 3–6, [14–16]
Loss	7–3	Aug 2010	Los Angeles Open, United States (2)	250 Series	Hard	(Netherlands Antilles) Jean-Julien Rojer	(United States) Bob Bryan (United States) Mike Bryan	7–6^{(8–6)}, 2–6, [7–10]
Win	8–3	Oct 2010	Japan Open, Japan	500 Series	Hard	(Netherlands Antilles) Jean-Julien Rojer	(Italy) Andreas Seppi (Russia) Dmitry Tursunov	6–3, 6–2
Win	9–3	Oct 2010	Stockholm Open, Sweden	250 Series	Hard (i)	(Curaçao) Jean-Julien Rojer	(Sweden) Johan Brunström (Finland) Jarkko Nieminen	6–3, 6–4
Loss	9–4	Feb 2011	U.S. National Indoor Tennis Championships, United States	500 Series	Hard (i)	(Curaçao) Jean-Julien Rojer	(Belarus) Max Mirnyi (Canada) Daniel Nestor	2–6, 7–6^{(8–6)}, [3–10]
Win	10–4	May 2011	Estoril Open, Portugal (2)	250 Series	Clay	(Curaçao) Jean-Julien Rojer	(Spain) Marc López (Spain) David Marrero	6–3, 6–4
Win	11–4	May 2011	Open de Nice Côte d'Azur, France	250 Series	Clay	(Curaçao) Jean-Julien Rojer	(Mexico) Santiago González (Spain) David Marrero	6–3, 6–4
Win	12–4	Oct 2011	Malaysian Open, Malaysia	250 Series	Hard (i)	(Curaçao) Jean-Julien Rojer	(Czech Republic) František Čermák (Slovakia) Filip Polášek	6–1, 6–3
Loss	12–5	Nov 2011	Valencia Open, Spain	500 Series	Hard (i)	(Curaçao) Jean-Julien Rojer	(United States) Bob Bryan (United States) Mike Bryan	4–6, 6–7^{(9–11)}
Win	13–5	Feb 2012	Brasil Open, Brazil	250 Series	Clay	(Brazil) Bruno Soares	(Slovakia) Michal Mertiňák (Brazil) André Sá	3–6, 6–4, [10–8]
Loss	13–6	Oct 2012	Thailand Open, Thailand	250 Series	Hard (i)	(Australia) Paul Hanley	(Chinese Taipei) Lu Yen-hsun (Thailand) Danai Udomchoke	3–6, 4–6
Loss	13–7	Jan 2013	Brisbane International, Australia	250 Series	Hard	(Australia) Paul Hanley	(Brazil) Marcelo Melo (Spain) Tommy Robredo	6–4, 1–6, [5–10]
Loss	13–8	May 2013	Bavarian International Tennis Championships, Germany	250 Series	Clay	(Cyprus) Marcos Baghdatis	(Finland) Jarkko Nieminen (Russia) Dmitry Tursunov	1–6, 4–6
Win	14–8	Sep 2013	Malaysian Open, Malaysia (2)	250 Series	Hard (i)	(South Africa) Raven Klaasen	(Uruguay) Pablo Cuevas (Argentina) Horacio Zeballos	6–2, 6–4
Loss	14–9	Jan 2014	Australian Open, Australia	Grand Slam	Hard	(South Africa) Raven Klaasen	(Poland) Łukasz Kubot (Sweden) Robert Lindstedt	3–6, 3–6
Win	15–9	Feb 2014	U.S. National Indoor Tennis Championships, United States	250 Series	Hard (i)	(South Africa) Raven Klaasen	(United States) Bob Bryan (United States) Mike Bryan	6–4, 6–4
Win	16–9	Oct 2014	Stockholm Open, Sweden (2)	250 Series	Hard (i)	(South Africa) Raven Klaasen	(Philippines) Treat Huey (United States) Jack Sock	6–4, 6–3
Loss	16–10	Aug 2015	Winston-Salem Open, United States	250 Series	Hard	(United States) Scott Lipsky	(United Kingdom) Dominic Inglot (Sweden) Robert Lindstedt	2–6, 4–6
Win	17–10	Nov 2015	Valencia Open, Spain	250 Series	Hard (i)	(United States) Scott Lipsky	(Spain) Feliciano López (Belarus) Max Mirnyi	7–6^{(7–4)}, 6–3
Loss	17–11	Jan 2016	Auckland Open, New Zealand	250 Series	Hard	(United States) Scott Lipsky	(Croatia) Mate Pavić (New Zealand) Michael Venus	5–7, 4–6
Win	18–11	May 2016	Estoril Open, Portugal (3)	250 Series	Clay	(United States) Scott Lipsky	(Poland) Łukasz Kubot (Poland) Marcin Matkowski	6–4, 3–6, [10–8]

== Doubles performance timeline ==
Key
W	F	SF	QF	#R	RR	Q#	DNQ	A	NH

(W) winner; (F) finalist; (SF) semifinalist; (QF) quarterfinalist; (#R) rounds 4, 3, 2, 1; (RR) round-robin stage; (Q#) qualification round; (DNQ) did not qualify; (A) absent; (NH) not held; (SR) strike rate (events won / competed); (W–L) win–loss record.

Current till 2016 US Open.

Tournament	2007	2008	2009	2010	2011	2012	2013	2014	2015	2016	SR	W-L
Grand Slam tournaments
Australian Open	2R	3R	1R	QF	SF	QF	3R	F	3R	2R	0 / 10	23–10
French Open	1R	1R	1R	1R	1R	3R	2R	2R	1R	3R	0 / 10	6–10
Wimbledon	3R	2R	2R	1R	2R	2R	1R	3R	2R	A	0 / 9	9–9
US Open	2R	1R	1R	1R	2R	2R	2R	QF	3R	1R	0 / 10	9–10
Win–loss	4–4	3–4	1–4	3–4	6–4	7–4	4–4	11–4	5–4	3-3	0 / 39	47–39
