= Josh Goodall =

English tennis player (born 1985)

Joshua Goodall
- Country (sports): (United Kingdom) Great Britain; England
- Residence: Basingstoke, England, United Kingdom
- Born: 17 October 1985 (age 40) Basingstoke, England
- Height: 1.88 m (6 ft 2 in)
- Turned pro: 2004
- Retired: 2 October 2015
- Plays: Right-handed (two-handed backhand)
- Prize money: US$428,956

Singles
- Career record: 1–15
- Career titles: 0
- Highest ranking: No. 184 (13 July 2009)

Grand Slam singles results
- Australian Open: Q1 (2009)
- French Open: Q1 (2007, 2008, 2009, 2012)
- Wimbledon: 1R (2005, 2006, 2007, 2009, 2012)
- US Open: 1R (2006)

Doubles
- Career record: 5–9
- Career titles: 0
- Highest ranking: No. 114 (25 June 2007)

Grand Slam doubles results
- Wimbledon: 2R (2006, 2010)

Team competitions
- Davis Cup: Europe/Africa Zone Group I 2R (2012)
- Last updated on: 18 January 2017.

Joshua Jake Goodall (born 17 October 1985) is a retired English tennis player, former British no 2 and Davis Cup player. He is currently Head of Racquet Sports at Downe House School in Berkshire.

== Personal life ==
Goodall attended Cranbourne School, now called Cranbourne Business and Enterprise College. His parents remortgaged their house five times to support his tennis career.

== Career ==
On 23 June 2007 Goodall reached his only ATP (World) Tour final, in doubles, at the Nottingham Open. He and partner Ross Hutchins lost that match in three sets 6–4, 3–6, [5–10] to Eric Butorac and Jamie Murray.

Goodall was British no 2, behind Andy Murray from 13 August 2012 with a world ranking of 196, until 19 November 2012.

Goodall played Davis Cup twice, in the 2009 Europe/Africa Zone Group I first round against Ukraine and the 2012 Europe/Africa Zone Group I second round against Belgium. At the Belgium tie, Goodall was the British no 1, in the absence of Andy Murray.

== ATP career finals ==
=== Doubles: 1 (1 runner-up) ===
Legend Grand Slam tournaments (0–0) ATP World Tour Finals (0–0) ATP World Tour Masters 1000 (0–0) ATP World Tour 500 Series (0–0) ATP World Tour 250 Series (0–1)	Titles by surface Hard (0–0) Clay (0–0) Grass (0–1)	Titles by setting Outdoor (0–1) Indoor (0–0)

Result	W–L	Date	Tournament	Tier	Surface	Partner	Opponents	Score
Loss	0–1	Jun 2007	Nottingham Open, United Kingdom	Intl Series	Grass	(United Kingdom) Ross Hutchins	(United States) Eric Butorac (United Kingdom) Jamie Murray	6–4, 3–6, [5–10]

== ITF Futures tournament wins ==
=== Singles: 20 ===
No.	Date	Tournament	Surface	Opponent	Score
1.	11 September 2005	Nottingham	Hard	(United Kingdom) Richard Bloomfield	7–6^{(7–5)}, 7–6^{(7–4)}
2.	16 July 2006	Felixstowe	Grass	(Australia) Luke Bourgeois	6–4, 5–7, 6–4
3.	3 December 2006	Vendryně	Hard	(Ukraine) Sergei Bubka	6–4, 6–2
4.	29 September 2007	Nottingham	Hard	(United Kingdom) Jamie Baker	6–3, 6–4
5.	22 March 2008	Bath	Hard	(United Kingdom) Richard Bloomfield	4–6, 7–6^{(7–4)}, 6–4
6.	5 April 2008	Exmouth	Carpet	(Republic of Ireland) Conor Niland	6–4, 7–6^{(7–3)}
7.	20 September 2009	Nottingham	Hard	(United Kingdom) David Rice	6–4, 6–3
8.	10 July 2010	Ilkley	Grass	(United Kingdom) David Rice	6–3, 7–6^{(7–2)}
9.	9 July 2011	Ilkley	Grass	(United Kingdom) David Rice	7–5, 6–1
10.	16 July 2011	Frinton	Grass	(United Kingdom) Daniel Evans	6–3, 6–2
11.	16 July 2011	Wrexham	Hard	(United Kingdom) Sean Thornley	6–1, 6–2
12.	10 September 2011	Roehampton	Hard	(United Kingdom) Richard Bloomfield	7–6^{(7–4)}, 6–2
13.	22 October 2011	Glasgow	Hard	(Czech Republic) Jan Minář	7–6^{(7–3)}, 7–5
14.	15 January 2012	Schwieberdingen	Carpet	(Germany) Bastian Knittel	2–6, 7–6^{(7–4)}, 6–4
15.	1 April 2012	Fällanden	Carpet	(Austria) Philipp Oswald	6–4, 6–2
16.	22 April 2012	Heraklion	Carpet	(Germany) Dieter Kindlmann	6–3, 6–0
17.	14 July 2012	Ilkley	Grass	(United Kingdom) Edward Corrie	6–4, 6–1
18.	28 July 2012	Dublin	Grass	(Australia) Michael Look	7–6^{(8–6)}, 6–4
19.	4 August 2012	Wrexham	Hard	(France) Mathieu Rodrigues	6–3, 6–3
20.	12 October 2013	Sunderland	Hard	(United Kingdom) Ashley Hewitt	6–3, 6–2

== Grand Slam performance timelines ==
Key
W	F	SF	QF	#R	RR	Q#	DNQ	A	NH

(W) winner; (F) finalist; (SF) semifinalist; (QF) quarterfinalist; (#R) rounds 4, 3, 2, 1; (RR) round-robin stage; (Q#) qualification round; (DNQ) did not qualify; (A) absent; (NH) not held; (SR) strike rate (events won / competed); (W–L) win–loss record.

=== Singles ===
Tournament	2004	2005	2006	2007	2008	2009	2010	2011	2012	2013	W–L
Australian Open	A	A	A	A	A	Q1	A	A	A	A	0–0
French Open	A	A	A	Q1	Q1	Q1	A	A	Q1	A	0–0
Wimbledon	A	1R	1R	1R	Q2	1R	Q2	A	1R	Q1	0–4
US Open	A	A	1R	A	Q2	Q1	A	A	Q1	A	0–1

=== Doubles ===
Tournament	2004	2005	2006	2007	2008	2009	2010	2011	2012	2013	W–L
Australian Open	A	A	A	A	A	A	A	A	A	A	0–0
French Open	A	A	A	A	A	A	A	A	A	A	0–0
Wimbledon	A	1R	2R	1R	1R	1R	2R	1R	1R	A	2–7
US Open	A	A	A	A	A	A	A	A	A	A	0–0
