= 2014 Düsseldorf Open =

- Date: 18–24 May
- Edition: 2nd
- Category: ATP World Tour 250 series
- Draw: 28S / 16D
- Prize money: €426,605
- Surface: Clay
- Location: Düsseldorf, Germany

Champions

Singles
- (Germany) Philipp Kohlschreiber

Doubles
- (Mexico) Santiago González / (United States) Scott Lipsky
← 2013 ·	Düsseldorf Open

The 2014 Düsseldorf Open was a men's tennis tournament played on clay courts. It was the second edition of the Düsseldorf Open as an ATP World Tour 250 series event on the 2014 ATP World Tour. It took place at the Rochusclub in Düsseldorf, Germany, from May 18 through May 24, 2014.

== Points and prize money ==
=== Point distribution ===
Event	W	F	SF	QF	Round of 16	Round of 32	Q	Q3	Q2	Q1
Singles	250	150	90	45	20	0	12	6	0	0
Doubles	250	150	90	45	0	—	—	—	—	—

=== Prize money ===
Event	W	F	SF	QF	Round of 16	Round of 32	Q3	Q2	Q1
Singles	€77,315	€40,720	€22,060	€12,565	€7,405	€4,385	€710	€340	—
Doubles *	€23,500	€12,350	€6,690	€3,830	€2,240	—	—	—	—

_{* per team}

== Singles main-draw entrants ==
=== Seeds ===
Country	Player	Rank^{1}	Seed
GER	Philipp Kohlschreiber	29	1
ESP	Marcel Granollers	31	2
ITA	Andreas Seppi	34	3
POR	João Sousa	41	4
TPE	Lu Yen-hsun	48	5
FIN	Jarkko Nieminen	51	6
CRO	Ivo Karlović	52	7
NED	Igor Sijsling	53	8

- Rankings are as of May 12, 2014.

=== Other entrants ===
The following players received wildcards into the singles main draw:

- (Germany) Dustin Brown
- (Germany) Tobias Kamke
- (Serbia) Nikola Milojević

The following players received entry from the qualifying draw:

- (Bosnia and Herzegovina) Mirza Bašić
- (Croatia) Mate Delić
- (Italy) Alessandro Giannessi
- (Australia) Jason Kubler

=== Withdrawals ===
Before the tournament

- (Colombia) Alejandro Falla
- (United States) Bradley Klahn

== Doubles main-draw entrants ==
=== Seeds ===
Country	Player	Country	Player	Rank^{1}	Seed
PHI	Treat Huey	GBR	Dominic Inglot	42	1
GBR	Jamie Murray	AUS	John Peers	67	2
MEX	Santiago González	USA	Scott Lipsky	75	3
POL	Tomasz Bednarek	CZE	Lukáš Dlouhý	99	4

- Rankings are as of May 12, 2014.

=== Other entrants ===
The following pairs received wildcards into the doubles main draw:

- (Argentina) Facundo Argüello / (Argentina) Manuel Peña López
- (Serbia) Dušan Lajović / (Chinese Taipei) Lu Yen-hsun

== Champions ==
=== Singles ===
- (Germany) Philipp Kohlschreiber def. (Croatia) Ivo Karlović, 6–2, 7–6^{(7–4)}

=== Doubles ===
- (Mexico) Santiago González / (United States) Scott Lipsky def. (Germany) Martin Emmrich / (Germany) Christopher Kas, 7–5, 4–6, [10–3]
