= 2014 Düsseldorf Open – Doubles =

Doubles
- 2014 Düsseldorf Open

Final
- Champions: (Mexico) Santiago González (United States) Scott Lipsky
- Runners-up: (Germany) Martin Emmrich (Germany) Christopher Kas
- Score: 7–5, 4–6, [10–3]

Events
Singles	Doubles
← 2013 ·	Düsseldorf Open

Andre Begemann and Martin Emmrich were the defending champions, but Begemann chose not to participate this year. Emmrich played alongside Christopher Kas, but lost in the final to Santiago González and Scott Lipsky, 5–7, 6–4, [3–10].

== Seeds ==
1. (Philippines) Treat Huey / (United Kingdom) Dominic Inglot (first round)
2. (United Kingdom) Jamie Murray / (Australia) John Peers (semifinals)
3. (Mexico) Santiago González / (United States) Scott Lipsky (champions)
4. (Poland) Tomasz Bednarek / (Czech Republic) Lukáš Dlouhý (first round)

== Draw ==
=== Key ===
- Q = Qualifier
- WC = Wild card
- LL = Lucky loser
- Alt = Alternate
- SE = Special exempt
- PR = Protected ranking
- ITF = ITF entry
- JE = Junior exempt
- w/o = Walkover
- r = Retired
- d = Defaulted
- SR = Special ranking

=== Draw ===
First round
1	(Philippines) T Huey (United Kingdom) D Inglot	3	6	[7]
(Spain) M Granollers (Spain) P Riba	6	4	[10]
(Sweden) J Brunström (Denmark) F Nielsen	6	6
(Russia) T Gabashvili (Netherlands) I Sijsling	3	2
4	(Poland) T Bednarek (Czech Republic) L Dlouhý	2	6^{5}
(Czech Republic) F Čermák (Russia) M Elgin	6	7^{7}
(United States) N Monroe (Germany) S Stadler	6	4	[7]
(Germany) M Emmrich (Germany) C Kas	2	6	[10]
PR	(United Kingdom) C Fleming (United Kingdom) R Hutchins	6	6^{1}	[5]
(Croatia) M Draganja (Finland) H Kontinen	3	7^{7}	[10]
WC	(Serbia) D Lajović (Chinese Taipei) Y-h Lu	7^{7}	0	[8]
3	(Mexico) S González (United States) S Lipsky	6^{5}	6	[10]
(Germany) D Brown (Austria) J Knowle	2	6	[8]
(Spain) P Carreño Busta (Portugal) J Sousa	6	4	[10]
WC	(Argentina) F Argüello (Argentina) M Peña López	6	2	[5]
2	(United Kingdom) J Murray (Australia) J Peers	4	6	[10]

Quarterfinals
(Spain) M Granollers (Spain) P Riba	2	4
(Sweden) J Brunström (Denmark) F Nielsen	6	6
(Czech Republic) F Čermák (Russia) M Elgin	3	4
(Germany) M Emmrich (Germany) C Kas	6	6
(Croatia) M Draganja (Finland) H Kontinen	6^{8}	2
3	(Mexico) S González (United States) S Lipsky	7^{10}	6
(Spain) P Carreño Busta (Portugal) J Sousa	2	3
2	(United Kingdom) J Murray (Australia) J Peers	6	6

Semifinals
(Sweden) J Brunström (Denmark) F Nielsen	0	5
(Germany) M Emmrich (Germany) C Kas	6	7
3	(Mexico) S González (United States) S Lipsky	6	7
2	(United Kingdom) J Murray (Australia) J Peers	4	5

Final
(Germany) M Emmrich (Germany) C Kas	5	6	[3]
3	(Mexico) S González (United States) S Lipsky	7	4	[10]
