= 2013 Power Horse Cup – Doubles =

Doubles
- 2013 Power Horse Cup

Final
- Champions: (Germany) Andre Begemann (Germany) Martin Emmrich
- Runners-up: (Philippines) Treat Conrad Huey (United Kingdom) Dominic Inglot
- Score: 7–5, 6–2

Events
| Singles | Doubles |
| Power Horse Cup | · 2014 → |

Andre Begemann and Martin Emmrich won the first edition of the tournament, defeating Treat Conrad Huey and Dominic Inglot in the final, 7–5, 6–2.

== Seeds ==
1. (United Kingdom) Colin Fleming / (United Kingdom) Jonathan Marray (semifinals)
2. (Austria) Julian Knowle / (Slovakia) Filip Polášek (first round)
3. (Philippines) Treat Conrad Huey / (United Kingdom) Dominic Inglot (final)
4. (Denmark) Frederik Nielsen / (Brazil) André Sá (semifinals)

== Draw ==
=== Key ===
- Q = Qualifier
- WC = Wild card
- LL = Lucky loser
- Alt = Alternate
- SE = Special exempt
- PR = Protected ranking
- ITF = ITF entry
- JE = Junior exempt
- w/o = Walkover
- r = Retired
- d = Defaulted
- SR = Special ranking

=== Draw ===
First round
1 | (United Kingdom) C Fleming (United Kingdom) J Marray | 7^{7} | 6
WC | (Germany) D Brown (Germany) F Moser | 6^{2} | 4
(Germany) C Kas (Austria) O Marach | 6^{3} | 6 | [8]
(United Kingdom) J Murray (Australia) J Peers | 7^{7} | 4 | [10]
3 | (Philippines) TC Huey (United Kingdom) D Inglot | 5 | 7^{7} | [10]
(Germany) P Marx (Romania) F Mergea | 7 | 6^{2} | 2
(Poland) T Bednarek (United Kingdom) J Delgado | 2 | 4
(Germany) D Brands (Netherlands) I Sijsling | 6 | 6
(Germany) T Haas (United States) M Russell | 4 | 7^{7} | [8]
(Israel) J Erlich (Russia) D Tursunov | 6 | 6^{5} | [10]
WC | (Germany) R Becker (Germany) D Schulz | 2 | 2
4 | (Denmark) F Nielsen (Brazil) A Sá | 6 | 6
(Germany) A Begemann (Germany) M Emmrich | 6 | 6
(India) R Bopanna (India) P Raja | 4 | 2
(Croatia) I Dodig (Czech Republic) L Rosol | 6 | 3 | [10]
2 | (Austria) J Knowle (Slovakia) F Polášek | 2 | 6 | [8]

Quarterfinals
1 | (United Kingdom) C Fleming (United Kingdom) J Marray | 7 | 6
(United Kingdom) J Murray (Australia) J Peers | 5 | 3
3 | (Philippines) TC Huey (United Kingdom) D Inglot | 7^{7} | 6
(Germany) D Brands (Netherlands) I Sijsling | 6^{4} | 4
(Israel) J Erlich (Russia) D Tursunov | 4 | 7 | [8]
4 | (Denmark) F Nielsen (Brazil) A Sá | 6 | 5 | [10]
(Germany) A Begemann (Germany) M Emmrich | 6 | 7
(Croatia) I Dodig (Czech Republic) L Rosol | 4 | 5

Semifinals
1 | (United Kingdom) C Fleming (United Kingdom) J Marray | 2 | 7^{7} | [5]
3 | (Philippines) TC Huey (United Kingdom) D Inglot | 6 | 6^{2} | [10]
4 | (Denmark) F Nielsen (Brazil) A Sá | 7^{11} | 1 | [10]
(Germany) A Begemann (Germany) M Emmrich | 6^{9} | 6 | [12]

Final
3 | (Philippines) TC Huey (United Kingdom) D Inglot | 5 | 2
(Germany) A Begemann (Germany) M Emmrich | 7 | 6
