= 2013 Power Horse Cup – Singles =

Singles
- 2013 Power Horse Cup

Final
- Champion: (Argentina) Juan Mónaco
- Runner-up: (Finland) Jarkko Nieminen
- Score: 6–4, 6–3

Events
Singles	Doubles
- Power Horse Cup

Juan Mónaco won the first edition of the tournament, defeating Jarkko Nieminen in the final, 6–4, 6–3.

== Seeds ==
The top four seeds receive a bye into the second round.

1. (Serbia) Janko Tipsarević (second round)
2. (Germany) Tommy Haas (quarterfinals, withdrew)
3. (Argentina) Juan Mónaco (champion)
4. (Germany) Philipp Kohlschreiber (second round)
5. (Czech Republic) Lukáš Rosol (first round)
6. (Finland) Jarkko Nieminen (final)
7. (Serbia) Viktor Troicki (quarterfinals)
8. (Russia) Nikolay Davydenko (first round)

== Draw ==
Key

- Q = Qualifier
- WC = Wild card
- LL = Lucky loser
- Alt = Alternate
- ITF = ITF entry
- PR = Protected ranking
- SR = Special ranking
- SE = Special exempt
- JE = Junior exempt
- JR = Junior Accelerator Programme entrant
- CO = College Accelerator Programme entrant
- NG = Next Gen Accelerator Program entrant
- w/o = Walkover
- r = Retired
- d = Defaulted

=== Finals ===
Semifinals
Q	(Argentina) Guido Pella	4	6^{8}
3/WC	(Argentina) Juan Mónaco	6	7^{10}
(Netherlands) Igor Sijsling	5	6	3
6	(Finland) Jarkko Nieminen	7	4	6

Final
3/WC	(Argentina) Juan Mónaco	6	6
6	(Finland) Jarkko Nieminen	4	3

=== Top half ===
First round
Q	(Argentina) G Pella	6	4	6
Q	(Poland) Ł Kubot	4	6	4
(Belgium) D Goffin	7	0	2
(Slovenia) G Žemlja	5	6	6
(United States) M Russell	6	3	4
7	(Serbia) V Troicki	3	6	6
(Japan) G Soeda	4	0
Q	(Brazil) A Ghem	6	6
(Germany) T Kamke	6	6
WC	(Germany) B Becker	3	2
LL	(Slovenia) A Bedene	3	6	6
8	(Russia) N Davydenko	6	4	3

Second round
1	(Serbia) J Tipsarević	6^{1}	1
Q	(Argentina) G Pella	7^{7}	6
(Slovenia) G Žemlja	3	6^{3}
7	(Serbia) V Troicki	6	7^{7}
3/WC	(Argentina) J Mónaco	6	6
Q	(Brazil) A Ghem	4	4
(Germany) T Kamke	6	6
LL	(Slovenia) A Bedene	1	4

Quarterfinals
Q	(Argentina) G Pella	7^{7}	7
7	(Serbia) V Troicki	6^{5}	5
3/WC	(Argentina) J Mónaco	6	6
(Germany) T Kamke	3	4

Semifinals
Q	(Argentina) G Pella	4	6^{8}
3/WC	(Argentina) J Mónaco	6	7^{10}

=== Bottom half ===
First round
5	(Czech Republic) L Rosol	4	3
(Germany) D Brands	6	6
(Czech Republic) J Hájek	6	6
(Russia) E Donskoy	2	2
Q	(Kazakhstan) E Korolev	2	4
(Netherlands) I Sijsling	6	6
6	(Finland) J Nieminen	6	6
(Slovakia) L Lacko	3	1
(Spain) R Bautista Agut	2	6	6
(Luxembourg) G Müller	6	4	2
(Slovenia) B Kavčič	5	4
(Croatia) I Dodig	7	6

Second round
(Germany) D Brands	1	0
(Czech Republic) J Hájek	6	6
(Netherlands) I Sijsling	3	6	6
4	(Germany) P Kohlschreiber	6	3	4
6	(Finland) J Nieminen	6	5	6
(Spain) R Bautista Agut	4	7	3
(Croatia) I Dodig	6	4	5
2/WC	(Germany) T Haas	3	6	7

Quarterfinals
(Czech Republic) J Hájek	3	1
(Netherlands) I Sijsling	6	6
6	(Finland) J Nieminen	w/o
2/WC	(Germany) T Haas

Semifinals
(Netherlands) I Sijsling	5	6	3
6	(Finland) J Nieminen	7	4	6

== Qualifying ==
=== Seeds ===
1. (Slovenia) Aljaž Bedene (qualifying competition, lucky loser)
2. (Poland) Łukasz Kubot (qualified)
3. (Argentina) Guido Pella (qualified)
4. (Portugal) João Sousa (qualifying competition)
5. (Argentina) Federico Delbonis (first round)
6. (Ukraine) Illya Marchenko (second round)
7. (Netherlands) Jesse Huta Galung (second round)
8. (Kazakhstan) Evgeny Korolev (qualified)

=== Qualifiers ===
1. (Kazakhstan) Evgeny Korolev
2. (Poland) Łukasz Kubot
3. (Argentina) Guido Pella
4. (Brazil) André Ghem

=== Lucky losers ===
1. (Slovenia) Aljaž Bedene

=== Qualifying draw ===
==== First qualifier ====
First round
1	(Slovenia) Aljaž Bedene	6	6
(Serbia) Ivan Bjelica	3	1
(Australia) Alex Bolt	2	6^{3}
(Germany) Nils Langer	6	7^{7}
(Germany) Dominik Meffert	7^{7}	6
(Croatia) Mate Pavić	6^{2}	2
(Serbia) Nikola Ćirić	6	1	2
8	(Kazakhstan) Evgeny Korolev	4	6	6

Second round
1	(Slovenia) Aljaž Bedene	6	7
(Germany) Nils Langer	3	5
(Germany) Dominik Meffert	4	1
8	(Kazakhstan) Evgeny Korolev	6	6

Qualifying competition
1	(Slovenia) Aljaž Bedene	2	6	4
8	(Kazakhstan) Evgeny Korolev	6	3	6

==== Second qualifier ====
First round
2	(Poland) Łukasz Kubot	6	6
(Germany) Peter Torebko	0	3
WC	(Germany) Richard Becker	6	6
(Slovakia) Pavol Červenák	3	2
(Denmark) Frederik Nielsen	3	2
(Austria) Martin Fischer	6	6
(Bosnia and Herzegovina) Tomislav Brkić	2	2
7	(Netherlands) Jesse Huta Galung	6	6

Second round
2	(Poland) Łukasz Kubot	7	6
WC	(Germany) Richard Becker	5	2
(Austria) Martin Fischer	6	6
7	(Netherlands) Jesse Huta Galung	3	3

Qualifying competition
2	(Poland) Łukasz Kubot	6	6
(Austria) Martin Fischer	4	3

==== Third qualifier ====
First round
3	(Argentina) Guido Pella	6	6
(Croatia) Dino Marcan	2	2
(Sweden) Andreas Vinciguerra	1	1
(United Kingdom) Alexander Ward	6	6
(Italy) Simone Vagnozzi	6	6
(Croatia) Duje Kekez	3	1
(Germany) Dustin Brown	7^{13}	6
5	(Argentina) Federico Delbonis	6^{11}	1

Second round
3	(Argentina) Guido Pella	6	2	7^{7}
(United Kingdom) Alexander Ward	4	6	6^{5}
(Italy) Simone Vagnozzi	4	6^{4}
(Germany) Dustin Brown	6	7^{7}

Qualifying competition
3	(Argentina) Guido Pella	1	6	7^{7}
(Germany) Dustin Brown	6	3	6^{3}

==== Fourth qualifier ====
First round
4	(Portugal) João Sousa	7	6
WC	(Germany) Dominik Schulz	5	4
WC	(Germany) Andre Begemann	6	6
(United Kingdom) Joshua Milton	3	0
(Brazil) André Ghem	6	6
WC	(Germany) Maximilian Dinslaken	3	0
(United Kingdom) Oliver Golding	6	2	6^{4}
6	(Ukraine) Illya Marchenko	4	6	7^{7}

Second round
4	(Portugal) João Sousa	7	6
WC	(Germany) Andre Begemann	5	2
(Brazil) André Ghem	5	6	6
6	(Ukraine) Illya Marchenko	7	3	4

Qualifying competition
4	(Portugal) João Sousa	3	3
(Brazil) André Ghem	6	6
