= 2013 Power Horse Cup =

- Date: 19–25 May
- Edition: 1st
- Category: ATP World Tour 250 series
- Draw: 28S / 16D
- Prize money: €467,800
- Surface: Clay
- Location: Düsseldorf, Germany

Champions

Singles
- (Argentina) Juan Mónaco

Doubles
- (Germany) Andre Begemann / (Germany) Martin Emmrich
Power Horse Cup	· 2014 →

The 2013 Power Horse Cup was a men's tennis tournament played on clay courts. It was the first edition of the Power Horse Cup as an ATP World Tour 250 series event on the 2013 ATP World Tour and replaced the World Team Cup, a team event previously held at the same venue. It took place at the Rochusclub in Düsseldorf, Germany, from May 19 through May 25, 2013.

== Singles main draw entrants ==
=== Seeds ===
Country	Player	Rank^{1}	Seed
SRB	Janko Tipsarević	10	1
GER	Tommy Haas	14	2
ARG	Juan Mónaco	18	3
GER	Philipp Kohlschreiber	22	4
CZE	Lukáš Rosol	33	5
FIN	Jarkko Nieminen	41	6
SRB	Viktor Troicki	42	7
RUS	Nikolay Davydenko	44	8

- Rankings are as of May 13, 2013.

=== Other entrants ===
The following players received wildcards into the singles main draw:

- (Germany) Benjamin Becker
- (Germany) Tommy Haas
- (Argentina) Juan Mónaco

The following players received entry from the qualifying draw:

- (Brazil) André Ghem
- (Kazakhstan) Evgeny Korolev
- (Poland) Łukasz Kubot
- (Argentina) Guido Pella

The following player received entry as a lucky loser:

- (Slovenia) Aljaž Bedene

=== Withdrawals ===
Before the tournament

- (Spain) Nicolás Almagro
- (Bulgaria) Grigor Dimitrov
- (Germany) Florian Mayer
- (Germany) Philipp Petzschner
- (Russia) Dmitry Tursunov (left hamstring injury)
- (Russia) Mikhail Youzhny

During the tournament

- (Germany) Tommy Haas (illness)

== Doubles main draw entrants ==
=== Seeds ===
Country	Player	Country	Player	Rank^{1}	Seed
GBR	Colin Fleming	GBR	Jonathan Marray	44	1
AUT	Julian Knowle	SVK	Filip Polášek	61	2
PHI	Treat Conrad Huey	GBR	Dominic Inglot	70	3
DEN	Frederik Nielsen	BRA	André Sá	107	4

- Rankings are as of May 13, 2013.

=== Other entrants ===
The following pairs received wildcards into the doubles main draw:

- (Germany) Richard Becker / (Germany) Dominik Schulz
- (Germany) Dustin Brown / (Germany) Frank Moser

== Champions ==
=== Singles ===
- (Argentina) Juan Mónaco def. (Finland) Jarkko Nieminen, 6–4, 6–3

=== Doubles ===
- (Germany) Andre Begemann / (Germany) Martin Emmrich def. (Philippines) Treat Conrad Huey / (United Kingdom) Dominic Inglot, 7–5, 6–2
