= 2014 Düsseldorf Open – Singles =

Singles
- 2014 Düsseldorf Open

Final
- Champion: (Germany) Philipp Kohlschreiber
- Runner-up: (Croatia) Ivo Karlović
- Score: 6–2, 7–6^{(7–4)}

Events
Singles	Doubles
- Düsseldorf Open

Juan Mónaco was the defending champion, but lost to Ivo Karlović in the quarterfinals.

Philipp Kohlschreiber won the title, defeating Ivo Karlović in the final, 6–2, 7–6^{(7–4)}.

== Seeds ==
The top four seeds receive a bye into the second round.

1. (Germany) Philipp Kohlschreiber (champion)
2. (Spain) Marcel Granollers (second round)
3. (Italy) Andreas Seppi (quarterfinals)
4. (Portugal) João Sousa (second round)
5. (Chinese Taipei) Lu Yen-hsun (first round)
6. (Finland) Jarkko Nieminen (first round)
7. (Croatia) Ivo Karlović (final)
8. (Netherlands) Igor Sijsling (first round)

== Draw ==
Key

- Q = Qualifier
- WC = Wild card
- LL = Lucky loser
- Alt = Alternate
- ITF = ITF entry
- PR = Protected ranking
- SR = Special ranking
- SE = Special exempt
- JE = Junior exempt
- JR = Junior Accelerator Programme entrant
- CO = College Accelerator Programme entrant
- NG = Next Gen Accelerator Program entrant
- w/o = Walkover
- r = Retired
- d = Defaulted

=== Finals ===
Semifinals
1	(Germany) Philipp Kohlschreiber	6	2	6
(Uzbekistan) Denis Istomin	2	6	4
(Czech Republic) Jiří Veselý	6^{6}	6^{7}
7	(Croatia) Ivo Karlović	7^{8}	7^{9}

Final
1	(Germany) Philipp Kohlschreiber	6	7^{7}
7	(Croatia) Ivo Karlović	2	6^{4}

=== Top half ===
First round
(Russia) T Gabashvili	3	6	6
(Serbia) D Lajović	6	3	4
(Poland) M Przysiężny	5	5
Q	(Croatia) M Delić	7	7
WC	(Germany) D Brown	7^{7}	6
5	(Chinese Taipei) Y-h Lu	6^{3}	2
(Australia) M Matosevic	6	3	4
(France) A Mannarino	3	6	6
Q	(Italy) A Giannessi	5	6	1
Q	(Australia) J Kubler	7	3	6
(Uzbekistan) D Istomin	6^{5}	6	6
6	(Finland) J Nieminen	7^{7}	3	2

Second round
1	(Germany) P Kohlschreiber	6	6
(Russia) T Gabashvili	3	1
Q	(Croatia) M Delić	6	6
WC	(Germany) D Brown	3	0
3	(Italy) A Seppi	6	6
(France) A Mannarino	2	1
Q	(Australia) J Kubler	6	4	2
(Uzbekistan) D Istomin	3	6	6

Quarterfinals
1	(Germany) P Kohlschreiber	7	4	6
Q	(Croatia) M Delić	5	6	1
3	(Italy) A Seppi	3	4
(Uzbekistan) D Istomin	6	6

Semifinals
1	(Germany) P Kohlschreiber	6	4	6
(Uzbekistan) D Istomin	2	6	4

=== Bottom half ===
First round
8	(Netherlands) I Sijsling	6^{2}	3
(Czech Republic) J Veselý	7^{7}	6
(Russia) N Davydenko	6	6
(Israel) D Sela	3	1
(Spain) P Carreño Busta	4	1
(Austria) J Melzer	6	6
7	(Croatia) I Karlović	3	7	7^{7}
WC	(Germany) T Kamke	6	5	6^{5}
Q	(Bosnia and Herzegovina) M Bašić	2	7	4
WC	(Serbia) N Milojević	6	5	6
(Germany) B Becker	2	1
(Argentina) J Mónaco	6	6

Second round
(Czech Republic) J Veselý	6	7^{7}
(Russia) N Davydenko	1	6^{5}
(Austria) J Melzer	7^{8}	4	6
4	(Portugal) J Sousa	6^{6}	6	4
7	(Croatia) I Karlović	6	7
WC	(Serbia) N Milojević	4	5
(Argentina) J Mónaco	6	6
2	(Spain) M Granollers	1	2

Quarterfinals
(Czech Republic) J Veselý	6	6
(Austria) J Melzer	1	1
7	(Croatia) I Karlović	6	3	6
(Argentina) J Mónaco	4	6	3

Semifinals
(Czech Republic) J Veselý	6^{6}	6^{7}
7	(Croatia) I Karlović	7^{8}	7^{9}

== Qualifying ==
=== Seeds ===
1. (United States) Michael Russell (first round)
2. (Spain) Pere Riba (first round)
3. (Dominican Republic) Víctor Estrella Burgos (second round)
4. (Argentina) Facundo Argüello (first round)
5. (Australia) Nick Kyrgios (second round, retired)
6. (Slovakia) Miloslav Mečíř Jr. (second round)
7. (Croatia) Mate Delić (qualified)
8. (Republic of Ireland) Louk Sorensen (qualifying competition)

=== Qualifiers ===
1. (Australia) Jason Kubler
2. (Croatia) Mate Delić
3. (Italy) Alessandro Giannessi
4. (Bosnia and Herzegovina) Mirza Bašić

=== Qualifying draw ===
==== First qualifier ====
First round
1	(United States) Michael Russell	1	4
(Austria) Nicolas Reissig	6	6
(Zimbabwe) Takanyi Garanganga	6	4	7^{9}
(Barbados) Darian King	3	6	6^{7}
(United Kingdom) Oliver Golding	3	0
(Australia) Jason Kubler	6	6
(Belgium) Olivier Rochus	3	2
5	(Australia) Nick Kyrgios	6	6

Second round
(Austria) Nicolas Reissig	6	3	2
(Zimbabwe) Takanyi Garanganga	1	6	6
(Australia) Jason Kubler	1	6	3
5	(Australia) Nick Kyrgios	6	3	2^{r}

Qualifying competition
(Zimbabwe) Takanyi Garanganga	2	0
(Australia) Jason Kubler	6	6

==== Second qualifier ====
First round
2	(Spain) Pere Riba	2	2
(Spain) Daniel Muñoz de la Nava	6	6
(Slovakia) Jozef Kovalík	6	6
(Russia) Alexey Vatutin	0	3
(United Kingdom) Alexander Ward	7	4	6
WC	(Kazakhstan) Evgeny Korolev	5	6	4
WC	(Belgium) Scott Nicolas	1	0
7	(Croatia) Mate Delić	6	6

Second round
(Spain) Daniel Muñoz de la Nava	6^{7}	6	4
(Slovakia) Jozef Kovalík	7^{9}	3	6
(United Kingdom) Alexander Ward	5	4
7	(Croatia) Mate Delić	7	6

Qualifying competition
(Slovakia) Jozef Kovalík	4	5
7	(Croatia) Mate Delić	6	7

==== Third qualifier ====
First round
3	(Dominican Republic) Víctor Estrella Burgos	6	6
WC	(Argentina) Manuel Peña López	1	2
(Italy) Alessandro Giannessi	6	6
(Brazil) José Pereira	4	3
(Germany) Peter Torebko	6^{5}	7^{7}	4
WC	(Germany) Alexander Zverev	7^{7}	6^{3}	6
(Brazil) Leonardo Kirche	0	1^{r}
6	(Slovakia) Miloslav Mečíř Jr.	6	2

Second round
3	(Dominican Republic) Víctor Estrella Burgos	6	3	1
(Italy) Alessandro Giannessi	2	6	6
WC	(Germany) Alexander Zverev	6	6
6	(Slovakia) Miloslav Mečíř Jr.	3	3

Qualifying competition
(Italy) Alessandro Giannessi	2	6	6
WC	(Germany) Alexander Zverev	6	2	1

==== Fourth qualifier ====
First round
4	(Argentina) Facundo Argüello	6^{5}	2
(Bosnia and Herzegovina) Mirza Bašić	7^{7}	6
(Germany) Björn Phau	5	6	6
(Estonia) Jürgen Zopp	7	3	4
PR	(Portugal) Frederico Gil	3	0
(Belarus) Egor Gerasimov	6	6
(Switzerland) Michael Lammer	2	3
8	(Republic of Ireland) Louk Sorensen	6	6

Second round
(Bosnia and Herzegovina) Mirza Bašić	4	6	6
(Germany) Björn Phau	6	1	4
(Belarus) Egor Gerasimov	3	1
8	(Republic of Ireland) Louk Sorensen	6	6

Qualifying competition
(Bosnia and Herzegovina) Mirza Bašić	5	7^{7}	6
8	(Republic of Ireland) Louk Sorensen	7	6^{3}	2
