= Dominic Inglot =

British tennis player (born 1986)

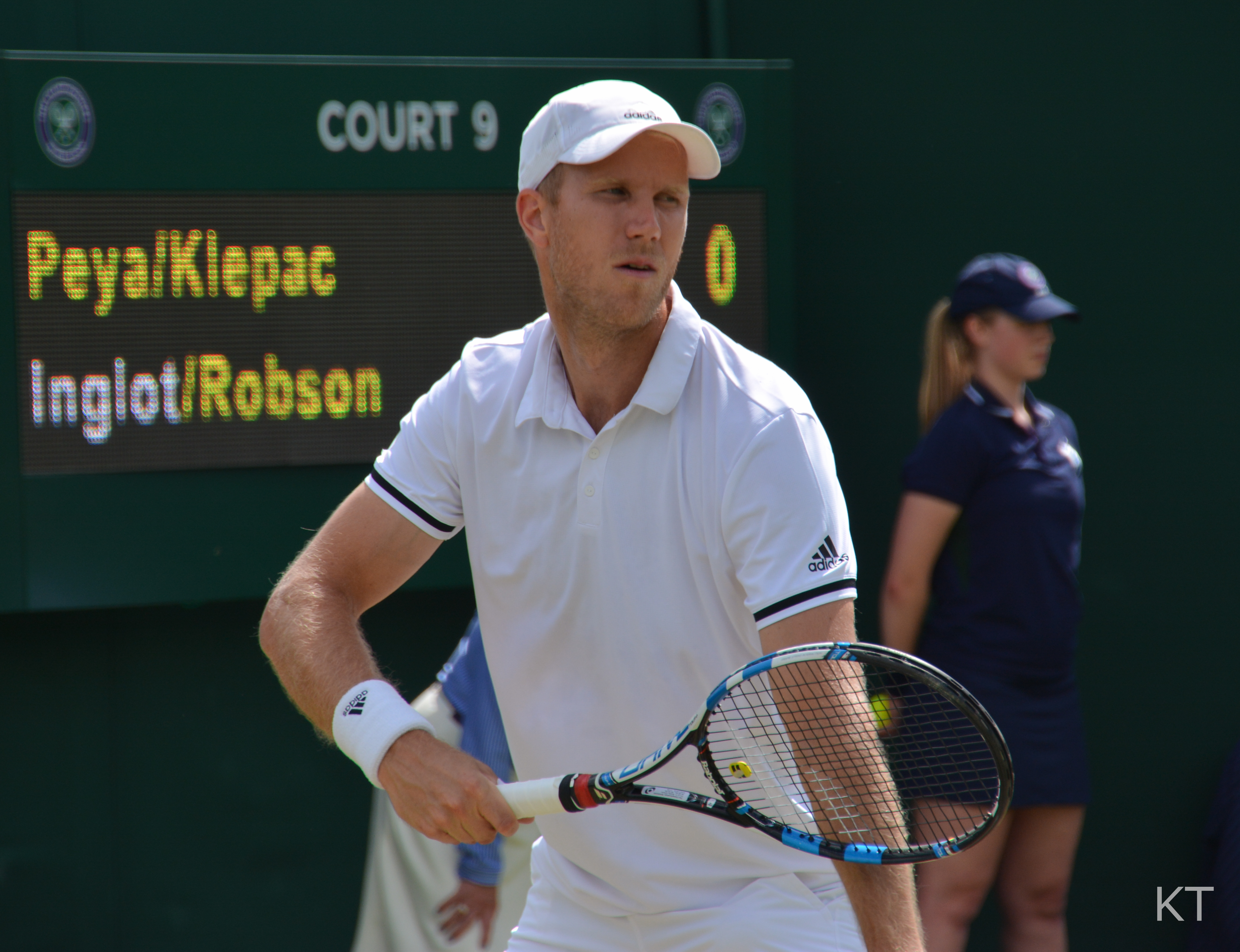
- Inglot at the 2016 Wimbledon Championships in London, England.
- Country (sports): (United Kingdom) Great Britain
- Residence: London, England
- Born: 6 March 1986 (age 40) London, England
- Height: 6 ft 6 in (198 cm)
- Turned pro: 2004
- Retired: 2022
- Plays: Right-handed (one-handed backhand)
- College: Virginia Cavaliers
- Prize money: $ 1,969,051

Singles
- Career record: 0–2 (in ATP (World) Tour and Grand Slam main draw matches, and in Davis Cup)
- Career titles: 0
- Highest ranking: No. 561 (23 August 2010)

Doubles
- Career record: 249–211 (in ATP (World) Tour and Grand Slam main draw matches, in and Davis Cup)
- Career titles: 14
- Highest ranking: No. 18 (12 May 2014)

Grand Slam doubles results
- Australian Open: QF (2014, 2015, 2018)
- French Open: 3R (2012, 2013)
- Wimbledon: SF (2018)
- US Open: SF (2015)

Other doubles tournaments
- Olympic Games: 1R (2016)

Mixed doubles
- Career record: 10–15
- Career titles: 0

Grand Slam mixed doubles results
- Australian Open: 2R (2014)
- French Open: QF (2017)
- Wimbledon: 3R (2012)
- US Open: 2R (2016)

Team competitions
- Davis Cup: W (2015)
Medal record
Representing Great Britain
Men's Tennis
Davis Cup
Gold medal – first place	2015 Ghent	Men's Team
World Student Games
Silver medal – second place	2009 Belgrade	Men's Doubles
Bronze medal – third place	2009 Belgrade	Mixed Doubles
- Last updated on: 28 February 2022.

Dominic Inglot (/ˈɪŋɡlɒt/ ING-glot; born 6 March 1986) is a British former professional tennis player who was a doubles specialist. He made the final of twenty seven ATP World Tour events, winning fourteen, including the Citi Open and Swiss Indoors partnering Treat Huey and Franko Škugor, and also made the final of nine ATP Challenger Tour events winning six of them. He was a former British No. 1 in doubles. Also known as 'Dom the Bomb' due to his menacing serve.

Inglot made his debut in the Great Britain Davis Cup squad for the 2014 World Group first round tie against the United States. Inglot also played in the 2015 Davis Cup first round tie against the United States, and joined the team for the Final against Belgium, Great Britain winning the Davis Cup in 2015, the nation's first success in the tournament for 79 years. The Davis Cup team was awarded the 2015 BBC Sports Personality Team of the Year Award.

== Early and personal life ==
Dominic Inglot was born in London to Elizabeth and Andrei Inglot, a former professional football player from Poland, and he has one older brother called Alex. He learned to play tennis at St. Benedict's School and at the University of Virginia. As a Junior, he represented Middlesex County and also played on the international stage with England and Great Britain. In school, he also played volleyball – captaining the London Volleyball team – and still gained academic honours in the year 2001–02. Inglot speaks English and Polish.

For the 2004 film Wimbledon, he was selected as the tennis double for the actor Paul Bettany, whose character was a British tennis player who won Wimbledon with a wild-card entry.

== University tennis career ==
=== 2006–2007 ===
Inglot was the no. 2 doubles player at the NCAA All-Tournament Team. He finished second in the team VaSID All-State event. He ended the season ranked no. 108 in the ITA singles rankings, but was ranked as high as no. 67 for the season with a singles record 16–13 with three wins over ranked players. In the ITA doubles rankings, he ended the season ranked no. 50 with Houston Barrick, but was ranked as high as no. 40. They had a doubles record of 27–6.

=== 2007–2008 ===
Inglot participated at the ITA Singles All-American event and NCAA Singles Championship. Finished first in the team VaSID All-State event. He won the ITA Mideast Regional Singles Title and the ITA National Indoor Singles Backdraw defeating three top ten players on the way. He was also co-Champion at the UVa Fall Invitational singles. He ended the season ranked No. 26 in the ITA singles rankings, but was ranked as high as No. 3. In doubles he was ranked at No. 50 in the ITA rankings with Houston Barrick, but was ranked as high as No. 17.

=== 2008–2009 ===
Inglot and Michael Shabaz became the first doubles team from the ACC to win the NCAA Men's Doubles Championship. In 2009, Inglot won a silver medal at the World University Games in Belgrade partnering former professional player Max Jones. He finished his senior season as the No. 15 singles player in the country.

== Senior career ==
=== 2009 ===
Inglot spent most of the year on the Futures tour and partially towards the end of the year on the Challenger Tour. He got into eight finals, winning six of them, his best performance being at the Charlottesville open Challenger where he partnered Rylan Rizza. They got to the final but lost in three sets.

=== 2010 ===
In 2010, Inglot qualified for his first Grand Slam tournament partnering Chris Eaton at Wimbledon. In the first round, they won in four sets, Inglot's first ATP tour win. In the second round, they beat the then world no. 1 team of Daniel Nestor and Nenad Zimonjić in five sets, surprising everybody and proving to be the upset of the tournament. They were finally beaten in the third round, losing to Julien Benneteau and Michaël Llodra in four sets.

In August, Inglot and Treat Huey won the Vancouver Open, and a week later they won the Binghamton Doubles Championship for the second consecutive year.

Inglot got within sight of the doubles top 100.

=== 2011 ===
In 2011, Inglot had his quietest season to date as he struggled for form and even to play matches. At the start of the year, a three-month lay-off for an ankle injury became nine months after a knee problem was discovered, he got a taste of another side of life with a work placement in the city. Inglot said "The injury might have been career-ending and maybe, if I didn't have the support of the LTA, I wouldn't have been able to afford all those surgeries, so I'm lucky to be in that position and I've got to make use of it."

However, in November, Inglot won a title on a wildcard at a Challenger tour event, where he partnered Treat Huey at the Charlottesville open, winning the final in three sets.

=== 2012 ===
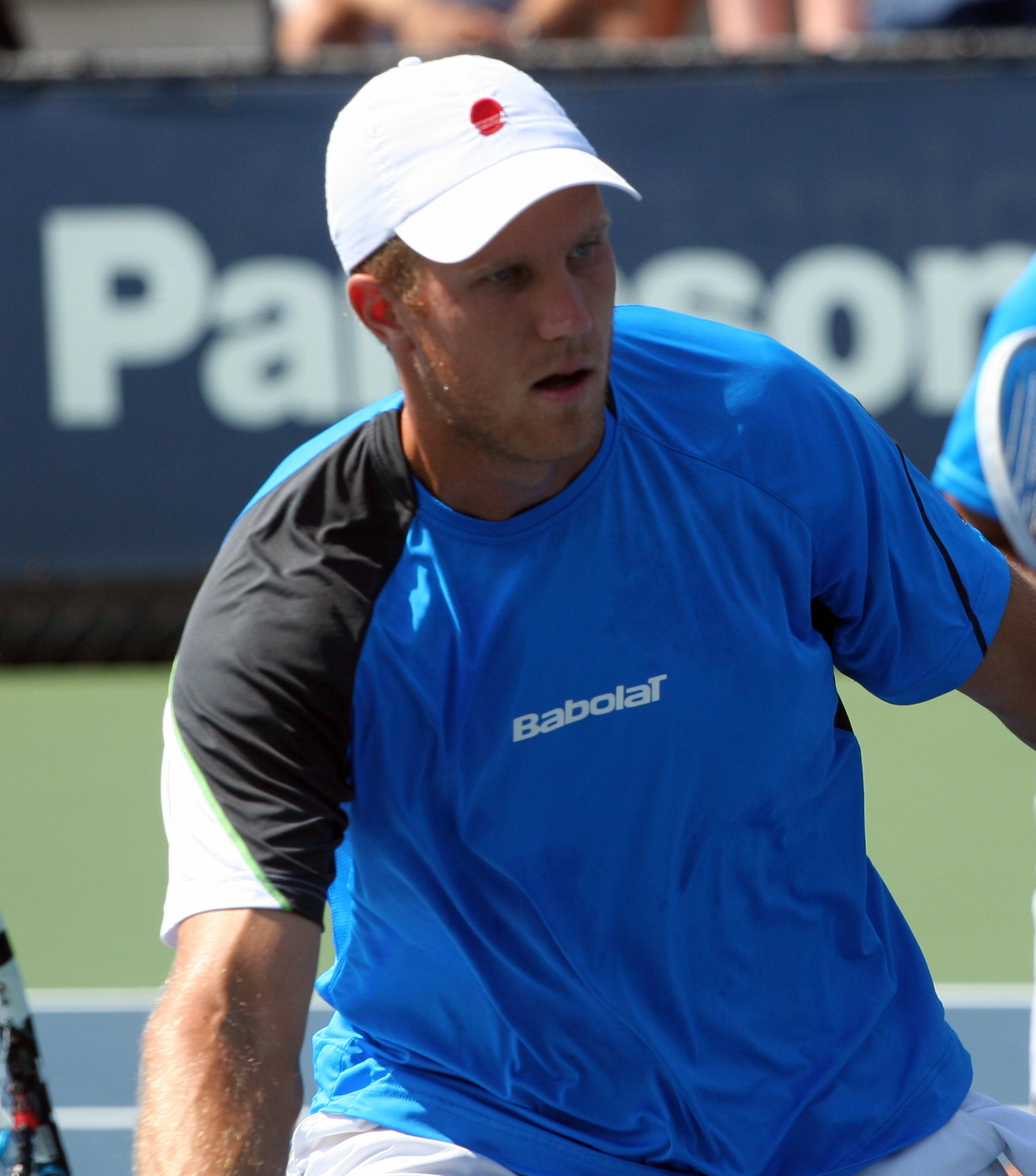
Inglot at the 2012 US Open.

Inglot made his first ATP Tour final at the 2012 U.S. Men's Clay Court Championships in Houston partnering Treat Huey in doubles, but they lost to the much more experienced duo of James Blake and Sam Querrey.

Inglot qualified for his first tournament other than Wimbledon at the French Open, where he once again partnered Huey. They made it to the third round, defeating the fifth seeds Robert Lindstedt and Horia Tecău in straight sets in the second round, but lost to tenth seeds Aisam-ul-Haq Qureshi and Jean-Julien Rojer in the next round. Later that week, he went on to win the Aegon Trophy again partnering Huey, defeating fellow countryman Jonathan Marray and Frederik Nielsen of Denmark. This raised his doubles ranking to a career high of rank no. 86 in the world.

At Wimbledon, he partnered Huey again, but unfortunately they lost in the first round in a five-set thriller to Jonathan Erlich and Andy Ram. He also competed in the mixed doubles event for first time at Wimbledon on a wildcard. He partnered Laura Robson, and they made it into the third round, defeating defending champions Jürgen Melzer and Iveta Benešová in three sets on the way. They eventually lost to fellow Brit Colin Fleming and Hsieh Su-wei of Taiwan in straight sets both on tiebreakers.

Inglot made his second ATP Tour final of the season at the 2012 Citi Open in Washington, D.C., again partnering Treat Huey. They defeated Kevin Anderson and Sam Querrey in three sets. This was Inglot and Huey's first tour-level title of their career and as a team. This win raised his doubles ranking to a career high no. 52 in the world.

At the US Open Inglot again partnered Huey. They were beaten in the second round by 15th seeds Alexander Peya and Bruno Soares in three sets.

In late September, Inglot qualified for his first singles match at ATP tour level. He lost the match in straight sets to the far more experienced Alex Bogomolov Jr.

In his final tournament of the season, Inglot had more success with partner Huey, making it to his third ATP tour final of the season at the Swiss Indoors. They faced the top seeds and very experienced duo of Daniel Nestor and Nenad Zimonjić. Unfortunately they lost the final on a champions tiebreaker. However, this did raise his doubles ranking to a career-high no. 40 in the world, the first time he has been inside the top 40.

=== 2013: First Grand Slam quarterfinal at the US Open ===
Inglot had a slow start to the 2013 season, making it to the quarterfinals at the Qatar Open to German duo of Christopher Kas and Philipp Kohlschreiber, despite having beaten the top seeded pair of Robert Lindstedt and Nenad Zimonjić. This was followed by a first round loss at the Australian Open to 4th seeds Max Mirnyi and Horia Tecău. This was followed by a run of one win in four matches, including a first round defeat in Rotterdam. Inglot made it to his first final of the season with Huey at the Power Horse Cup in Düsseldorf, where they were defeated by German pair of Andre Begemann and Martin Emmrich.

At the French Open, the duo made it to the round of 16, where they lost to Michaël Llodra and Nicolas Mahut in straight sets. After losing in the quarterfinals of the Gerry Weber Open, Inglot and Huey made it to the round of 16 at Wimbledon, losing to eventual champions Bob & Mike Bryan. The pair made it to their first ever Grand Slam quarterfinal at the US Open, defeating 3rd seeds Marcel Granollers and Marc López en route before losing to number 10 seeded Ivan Dodig and Marcelo Melo. Inglot finished the season with a career high ranking of 28th in the world.

In November, the Lawn Tennis Association announced a dramatic cut in elite player funding, with all financial support being withdrawn from Britain's doubles specialists and any singles players aged over 24, to reduce the number of supported players from 16 this year to just six in 2014.

=== 2014: Indian Wells quarterfinal, Career-high doubles ranking ===
In late January, Inglot made his debut in the Great Britain Davis Cup squad for the World Group first round tie against the United States in San Diego; Britain, making their return to the World Group after a five-year absence. Andy Murray and James Ward had won their singles matches, so team captain Leon Smith, rested Andy Murray for the doubles. Inglot and Colin Fleming had not played a competitive match together since a junior tournament in Corfu 13 years ago, and so the world-beating Bryan brothers, posted a four-set win against Inglot/Fleming. Later, Andy Murray secured his second singles victory; Great Britain winning the tie 3–1, to reach the Davis Cup quarter-finals for the first time since 1986.

In October, Inglot parted company with Treat Huey, with whom he had much success over four years, because he preferred repetitious drills to the Filipino's variety-based game. After the US Open, Inglot asked Romanian Florin Mergea for the number of Portugal's João Sousa, but Mergea suggested they try out as a pairing.

=== 2015: US Open & Paris Masters semifinals, Davis Cup Champion ===
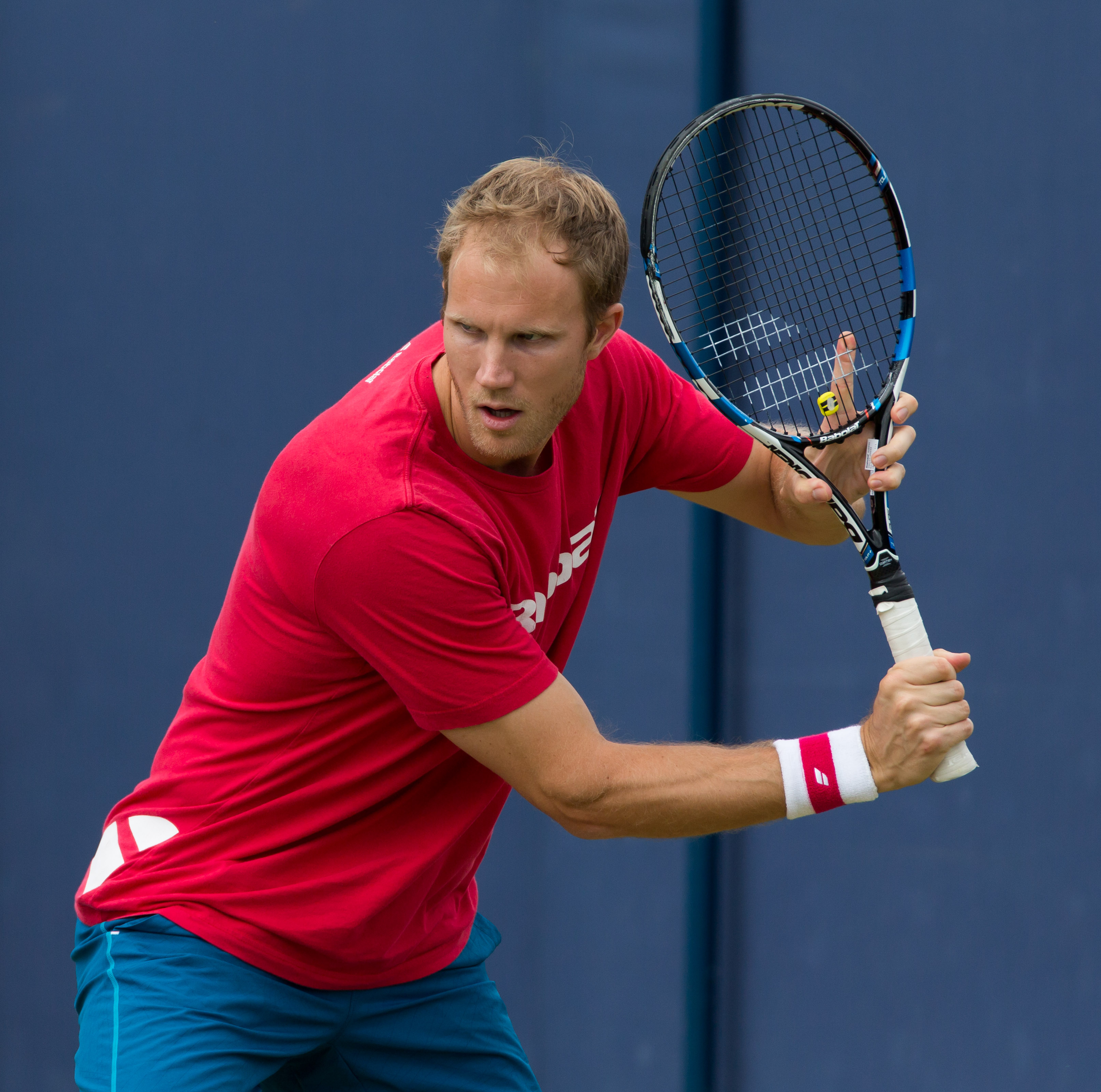
Inglot at the 2015 Aegon Championships in London, England.

At the Australian Open, Inglot and Florin Mergea beat the Bryan brothers in straight sets in only 68 minutes, eventually reaching the quarter final. The Bryan brothers were in their 400th week as the World No 1 doubles pair. A month later at the Dubai Tennis Championships, the pair again beat the Bryan brothers en route to a semi final appearance. Leon Smith, the Davis Cup captain, came to Dubai to check on Inglot, Andy Murray & Jamie Murray who were all playing there.

In March, having beaten the Bryans twice this year, Inglot was selected for the Davis Cup first round tie against the United States in Glasgow. Following Andy Murray and James Ward winning the opening singles rubbers, Inglot and Jamie Murray played the Bryan Brothers. This was the first time Inglot and Jamie Murray had played together since the juniors, 12 years ago. After the USA duo cruised through the first two sets, the Brits rallied but fell short at the final hurdle in five set defeat. Andy Murray won his next singles match, putting Great Britain through to the Davis Cup quarter-final. The last time Great Britain won back-to-back Davis Cup matches against the US, was 80 years ago.

In April, shortly after arriving home from the Miami Open, Inglot was shocked to be informed by Florin Mergea that he intended to play with India's Rohan Bopanna in future. Inglot/Mergea were currently seventh in the race to qualify for November's World Tour Finals.

At the US Open, Inglot playing with Swede Robert Lindstedt beat his former partner Florin Mergea and Rohan Bopanna, the sixth seeds, to reach his first Grand Slam semi-final. Jamie Murray played in the other semi-final, eventually reaching the final. This dashed Inglot's hopes of playing in next week's Davis Cup Semi-Final against Australia. Two Britons had not reached a Grand Slam semi-final since Andrew Castle and Jeremy Bates clashed in the 1988 Australian Open men's doubles.

In November, Inglot and Lindstedt reached the semifinals of the BNP Paribas Masters in Paris.

Kyle Edmund, James Ward, Jamie Murray and Andy Murray were announced for the 2015 Davis Cup Final versus Belgium in Ghent. The selection of Kyle Edmund meant that Inglot was left out, and the absence of Inglot, meant that Andy Murray would definitely have to play doubles with his brother Jamie. The inclusion of James Ward suggested that Leon Smith would replace Edmund with the more experienced Ward if the final was locked at 2–2 on Sunday, so Inglot and Dan Evans joined the British team as hitting partners. Great Britain went on to win the Davis Cup for the first time since 1936. Inglot and Dan Evans joined the team on the winner's podium, and they all received the same Davis Cup medals.

Inglot joined the rest of the Davis Cup team at the BBC Sports Personality of the Year Show, where they won the 2015 Team of the Year Award.

=== 2016: Monte Carlo quarterfinal, two ATP titles ===
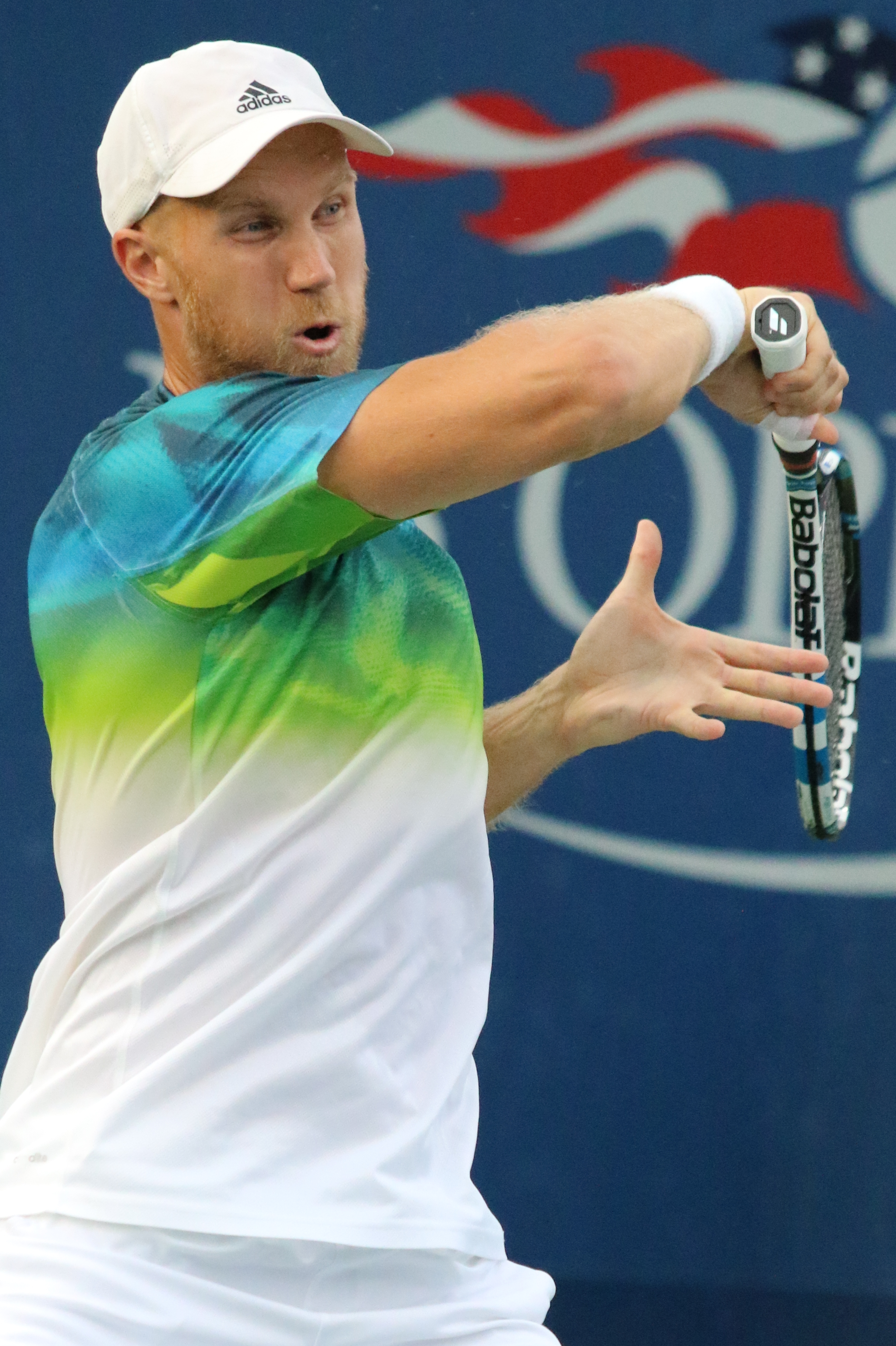
Inglot at the 2016 US Open.

At the Australian Open, Inglot/Lindstedt were beaten in the third round by eventual champions Jamie Murray and Bruno Soares. The Lindstedt partnership continued with mediocre results until the April Istanbul Open, where they were top seeds, but had to withdraw in the second round. Thereafter, Inglot played with a variety of partners.

Inglot and Andy Murray reached the quarterfinals of the Monte Carlo Masters, to be defeated by subsequent champions Pierre-Hugues Herbert and Nicolas Mahut.

Inglot and Daniel Nestor won the Nottingham Open in their second tournament together. A week later, they went out of Wimbledon in the second round.

In September, Inglot won his second title of the year with Henri Kontinen at the St. Petersburg Open.

=== 2022: Retirement ===
He announced his retirement in March 2022.

== ATP career finals ==
=== Doubles: 27 (14 titles, 13 runners-up) ===
Legend Grand Slam tournaments (0–0) ATP World Tour Finals (0–0) ATP World Tour Masters 1000 (0–0) ATP World Tour 500 Series (3–1) ATP World Tour 250 Series (11–12)	Finals by surface Hard (7–9) Clay (3–3) Grass (4–1)	Finals by setting Outdoor (10–7) Indoor (4–6)

Result	W–L	Date	Tournament	Tier	Surface	Partner	Opponents	Score
Loss	0–1	Apr 2012	US Clay Court Championships, United States	250 Series	Clay	(Philippines) Treat Huey	(United States) James Blake (United States) Sam Querrey	6–7^{(14–16)}, 3–6
Win	1–1	Aug 2012	Washington Open, United States	500 Series	Hard	(Philippines) Treat Huey	(South Africa) Kevin Anderson (United States) Sam Querrey	7–6^{(9–7)}, 6–7^{(9–11)}, [10–5]
Loss	1–2	Oct 2012	Swiss Indoors, Switzerland	500 Series	Hard (i)	(Philippines) Treat Huey	(Canada) Daniel Nestor (Serbia) Nenad Zimonjić	5–7, 7–6^{(7–4)}, [5–10]
Loss	1–3	May 2013	Düsseldorf Open, Germany	250 Series	Clay	(Philippines) Treat Huey	(Germany) Andre Begemann (Germany) Martin Emmrich	5–7, 2–6
Loss	1–4	Aug 2013	Winston-Salem Open, United States	250 Series	Hard	(Philippines) Treat Huey	(Canada) Daniel Nestor (India) Leander Paes	6–7^{(10–12)}, 5–7
Loss	1–5	Sep 2013	St. Petersburg Open, Russia	250 Series	Hard (i)	(Uzbekistan) Denis Istomin	(Spain) David Marrero (Spain) Fernando Verdasco	6–7^{(6–8)}, 3–6
Win	2–5	Oct 2013	Swiss Indoors, Switzerland	500 Series	Hard (i)	(Philippines) Treat Huey	(Austria) Julian Knowle (Austria) Oliver Marach	6–3, 3–6, [10–4]
Win	3–5	Jun 2014	Eastbourne International, United Kingdom	250 Series	Grass	(Philippines) Treat Huey	(Austria) Alexander Peya (Brazil) Bruno Soares	7–5, 5–7, [10–8]
Loss	3–6	Jan 2015	Auckland Open, New Zealand	250 Series	Hard	(Romania) Florin Mergea	(South Africa) Raven Klaasen (India) Leander Paes	6–7^{(1–7)}, 4–6
Loss	3–7	Feb 2015	Open Sud de France, France	250 Series	Hard (i)	(Romania) Florin Mergea	(New Zealand) Marcus Daniell (New Zealand) Artem Sitak	6–3, 4–6, [14–16]
Win	4–7	Aug 2015	Winston-Salem Open, United States	250 Series	Hard	(Sweden) Robert Lindstedt	(United States) Eric Butorac (United States) Scott Lipsky	6–2, 6–4
Loss	4–8	Jun 2016	Rosmalen Championships, Netherlands	250 Series	Grass	(South Africa) Raven Klaasen	(Croatia) Mate Pavić (New Zealand) Michael Venus	6–3, 3–6, [9–11]
Win	5–8	Jun 2016	Nottingham Open, United Kingdom	250 Series	Grass	(Canada) Daniel Nestor	(Croatia) Ivan Dodig (Brazil) Marcelo Melo	7–5, 7–6^{(7–4)}
Win	6–8	Sep 2016	St. Petersburg Open, Russia	250 Series	Hard (i)	(Finland) Henri Kontinen	(Germany) Andre Begemann (India) Leander Paes	4–6, 6–3, [12–10]
Loss	6–9	Feb 2017	Open 13, France	250 Series	Hard (i)	(Netherlands) Robin Haase	(France) Julien Benneteau (France) Nicolas Mahut	4–6, 7–6 ^{(11–9)}, [5–10]
Win	7–9	Apr 2017	Grand Prix Hassan II, Morocco	250 Series	Clay	(Croatia) Mate Pavić	(Spain) Marcel Granollers (Spain) Marc López	6–4, 2–6, [11–9]
Loss	7–10	Feb 2018	Open 13, France	250 Series	Hard (i)	(New Zealand) Marcus Daniell	(South Africa) Raven Klaasen (New Zealand) Michael Venus	7–6^{(7–2)}, 3–6, [4–10]
Win	8–10	Apr 2018	Hungarian Open, Hungary	250 Series	Clay	(Croatia) Franko Škugor	(Netherlands) Matwé Middelkoop (Argentina) Andrés Molteni	6–7^{(8–10)}, 6–1, [10–8]
Win	9–10	May 2018	Istanbul Open, Turkey	250 Series	Clay	(Sweden) Robert Lindstedt	(Japan) Ben McLachlan (United States) Nicholas Monroe	3–6, 6–3, [10–8]
Win	10–10	Jun 2018	Rosmalen Championships, Netherlands	250 Series	Grass	(Croatia) Franko Škugor	(South Africa) Raven Klaasen (New Zealand) Michael Venus	7–6^{(7–3)}, 7–5
Win	11–10	Oct 2018	Swiss Indoors, Switzerland (2)	500 Series	Hard (i)	(Croatia) Franko Škugor	(Germany) Alexander Zverev (Germany) Mischa Zverev	6–2, 7–5
Win	12–10	Jun 2019	Rosmalen Championships, Netherlands (2)	250 Series	Grass	(United States) Austin Krajicek	(Australia) Marcus Daniell (Netherlands) Wesley Koolhof	6–4, 4–6, [10–4]
Win	13–10	Jul 2019	Atlanta Open, United States	250 Series	Hard	(United States) Austin Krajicek	(United States) Bob Bryan (United States) Mike Bryan	6–4, 6–7^{(5–7)}, [11–9]
Loss	13–11	Aug 2019	Los Cabos Open, Mexico	250 Series	Hard	(United States) Austin Krajicek	(Monaco) Romain Arneodo (Monaco) Hugo Nys	5–7, 7–5, [14–16]
Loss	13–12	Feb 2020	Open Sud de France, France	250 Series	Hard (i)	(Pakistan) Aisam-ul-Haq Qureshi	(Serbia) Nikola Ćaćić (Croatia) Mate Pavić	4–6, 7–6^{(7–4)}, [4–10]
Win	14–12	Feb 2020	New York Open, United States	250 Series	Hard (i)	(Pakistan) Aisam-ul-Haq Qureshi	(United States) Steve Johnson (United States) Reilly Opelka	7–6^{(7–5)}, 7–6^{(8–6)}
Loss	14–13	May 2021	Estoril Open, Portugal	250 Series	Clay	(United Kingdom) Luke Bambridge	(Monaco) Hugo Nys (Germany) Tim Pütz	5–7, 6–3, [3–10]

== Challengers and Futures finals ==
=== Doubles: 23 (18 titles, 5 runner-ups) ===
Legend (doubles) ATP Challenger Tour (6–3) ITF Futures Tour (12–2)	Titles by surface Hard (14–5) Clay (1–0) Grass (1–0) Carpet (2–0)

Result	W–L	Date	Tournament	Tier	Surface	Partner	Opponents	Score
Win	1–0	Aug 2009	Great Britain F11, Ottershaw	Futures	Hard	(United Kingdom) Tim Bradshaw	(United Kingdom) Jamie Baker (United Kingdom) Chris Eaton	4–6, 7–6^{(7–2)}, [10–3]
Loss	1–1	Sep 2009	Great Britain F12, London	Futures	Hard	(United Kingdom) Matthew Brooklyn	(United Kingdom) Richard Bloomfield (United Kingdom) Barry Fulcher	6–3, 3–6, [4–10]
Win	2–1	Sep 2009	Great Britain F13, Wrexham	Futures	Hard	(United Kingdom) Chris Eaton	(South Africa) Andrew Anderson (Republic of Ireland) Colin O'Brien	3–6, 6–3, [10–6]
Win	3–1	Sep 2009	Great Britain F14, Nottingham	Futures	Hard	(United Kingdom) Chris Eaton	(United Kingdom) Josh Goodall (United Kingdom) Matthew Illingworth	6–3, 6–4
Win	4–1	Oct 2009	Germany F18, Hambach	Futures	Carpet (i)	(United Kingdom) Max Jones	(Germany) Kevin Deden (Germany) Pirmin Haenle	6–4, 7–6^{(7–5)}
Win	5–1	Oct 2009	Germany F19, Leimen	Futures	Hard (i)	(United Kingdom) Max Jones	(Germany) Holger Fischer (Germany) Tobias Klein	6–3, 6–1
Win	6–1	Oct 2009	Great Britain F15, Glasgow	Futures	Hard (i)	(United Kingdom) Chris Eaton	(United Kingdom) Daniel Cox (Belarus) Uladzimir Ignatik	6–0, 7–6^{(7–5)}
Loss	6–2	Nov 2009	Charlottesville, United States	Challenger	Hard (i)	(United States) Rylan Rizza	(Germany) Martin Emmrich (Sweden) Andreas Siljeström	4–6, 6–3, [9–11]
Win	7–2	Jan 2010	Great Britain F1, Glasgow	Futures	Hard (i)	(United Kingdom) Chris Eaton	(France) Olivier Charroin (France) Alexandre Renard	4–6, 6–3, [10–2]
Loss	7–3	Jan 2010	Great Britain F2, Sheffield	Futures	Hard (i)	(United Kingdom) Chris Eaton	(France) Olivier Charroin (France) Alexandre Renard	2–6, 4–6
Win	8–3	Feb 2010	Bosnia & Herzegovina F2, Sarajevo	Futures	Carpet (i)	(United Kingdom) Chris Eaton	(Republic of Ireland) James McGee (Republic of Ireland) Colin O'Brien	Walkover
Win	9–3	Aug 2010	Vancouver, Canada	Challenger	Hard	(Philippines) Treat Huey	(United States) Ryan Harrison (United States) Jesse Levine	6–4, 7–5
Win	10–3	Aug 2010	Binghamton, United States	Challenger	Hard	(Philippines) Treat Huey	(United States) Scott Lipsky (United States) David Martin	5–7, 7–6^{(7–2)}, [10–8]
Win	11–3	Oct 2010	Great Britain F17, Cardiff	Futures	Hard (i)	(United Kingdom) Josh Goodall	(Finland) Henri Kontinen (Finland) Timo Nieminen	6–1, 6–2
Win	12–3	Oct 2011	Charlottesville, United States	Challenger	Hard	(Philippines) Treat Huey	(United States) John Paul Fruttero (South Africa) Raven Klaasen	4–6, 6–3, [10–7]
Win	13–3	Jan 2012	Great Britain F1, Glasgow	Futures	Hard (i)	(United Kingdom) Chris Eaton	(United Kingdom) David Rice (United Kingdom) Sean Thornley	7–5, 6–2
Win	14–3	Jan 2012	Great Britain F2, Sheffield	Futures	Hard (i)	(United Kingdom) Chris Eaton	(United Kingdom) David Rice (United Kingdom) Sean Thornley	6–3, 7–5
Loss	14–4	Jan 2012	Talheim, Germany	Challenger	Hard (i)	(Philippines) Treat Huey	(Sweden) Johan Brunström (Denmark) Frederik Nielsen	3–6, 6–3, [6–10]
Win	15–4	Feb 2012	Dallas, United States	Challenger	Hard (i)	(United Kingdom) Chris Eaton	(United States) Nicholas Monroe (United States) Jack Sock	7–6^{(7–2)}, 6–4, [19–17]
Win	16–4	Mar 2012	Great Britain F4, Tipton	Futures	Hard (i)	(United Kingdom) Chris Eaton	(United Kingdom) David Rice (United Kingdom) Sean Thornley	6–3, 6–4
Win	17–4	Jun 2012	Nottingham, United Kingdom	Challenger	Grass	(Philippines) Treat Huey	(United Kingdom) Jonathan Marray (Denmark) Frederik Nielsen	6–4, 6–7^{(9–11)}, [10–8]
Loss	17–5	Mar 2013	Dallas, United States	Challenger	Hard	(United States) Eric Butorac	(Austria) Jürgen Melzer (Germany) Philipp Petzschner	3–6, 1–6
Win	18–5	Apr 2021	Marbella, Spain	Challenger	Clay	(Australia) Matt Reid	(Monaco) Romain Arneodo (Monaco) Hugo Nys	1–6, 6–3, [10–6]

== Performance timelines ==
Key
W	F	SF	QF	#R	RR	Q#	P#	DNQ	A	Z#	PO	G	S	B	NMS	NTI	P	NH

(W) winner; (F) finalist; (SF) semifinalist; (QF) quarterfinalist; (#R) rounds 4, 3, 2, 1; (RR) round-robin stage; (Q#) qualification round; (P#) preliminary round; (DNQ) did not qualify; (A) absent; (Z#) Davis/Fed Cup Zonal Group (with number indication) or (PO) play-off; (G) gold, (S) silver or (B) bronze Olympic/Paralympic medal; (NMS) not a Masters tournament; (NTI) not a Tier I tournament; (P) postponed; (NH) not held; (SR) strike rate (events won / competed); (W–L) win–loss record.
To avoid confusion and double counting, these charts are updated at the conclusion of a tournament or when the player's participation has ended.

=== Doubles ===
Tournament	2010	2011	2012	2013	2014	2015	2016	2017	2018	2019	2020	2021	2022	SR	W–L
Grand Slam tournaments
Australian Open	A	A	A	1R	QF	QF	3R	3R	QF	2R	1R	2R	2R	0 / 10	16–10
French Open	A	A	3R	3R	2R	A	A	1R	1R	1R	1R	1R	A	0 / 8	5–8
Wimbledon	3R	A	1R	3R	1R	2R	2R	1R	SF	1R	NH	2R	A	0 / 10	11–10
US Open	A	A	2R	QF	1R	SF	1R	1R	3R	1R	1R	2R	A	0 / 10	11–10
Win–loss	2–1	0–0	3–3	7–4	4–4	8–3	3–3	2–4	9–4	1–4	0–3	3–4	1–1	0 / 38	43–38
ATP World Tour Masters 1000
Indian Wells Masters	A	A	A	A	QF	QF	2R	A	A	QF	NH	A	A	0 / 4	7–4
Miami Open	A	A	A	2R	1R	1R	1R	1R	1R	1R	NH	A	A	0 / 7	1–7
Monte-Carlo Masters	A	A	A	A	1R	A	QF	A	A	1R	NH	A	A	0 / 3	2–3
Madrid Open	A	A	A	A	2R	A	A	A	A	1R	NH	A	A	0 / 2	1–2
Italian Open	A	A	A	2R	2R	A	2R	A	A	1R	A	A	A	0 / 4	1–4
Canadian Open	A	A	A	2R	1R	A	A	A	A	A	NH	A	A	0 / 2	1–2
Cincinnati Masters	A	A	A	A	1R	A	2R	A	A	A	A	A	A	0 / 2	1–2
Shanghai Masters	A	A	A	QF	A	2R	A	A	2R	A	NH			0 / 3	4–3
Paris Masters	A	A	A	1R	1R	SF	1R	A	2R	A	A	A	A	0 / 5	4–5
Win–loss	0–0	0–0	0–0	5–5	3–8	6–4	4–6	0–1	2–3	2–5	0–0	0–0	0–0	0 / 32	22–32
National representation
Summer Olympics	Not Held		A	Not Held			1R	Not Held				A	NH	0 / 1	0–1
Davis Cup	A	A	A	A	QF	W	SF	QF	1R	A	P	A	A	1 / 5	3–4
Win–loss	0–0	0–0	0–0	0–0	0–1	0–1	1–1	1–1	1–1	0–0	0–0	0–0	0–0	1 / 6	3–5
Career statistics
Titles	0	0	1	1	1	1	2	1	4	2	1	0	0	14	
Finals	0	0	3	4	1	3	3	2	5	3	2	1	0	27	
Overall win–loss	2–3	0–0	18–14	34–26	20–25	34–21	31–23	25–23	37–22	22–25	10–9	15–17	1–3	249–211	
Win %	40%	–	56%	57%	44%	62%	57%	52%	63%	47%	53%	48%	25%	54%	
Year-end ranking	116	540	40	28	48	23	43	51	20	60	60	60	560		

=== Mixed doubles ===
Tournament	2012	2013	2014	2015	2016	2017	2018	2019	SR	W–L
Grand Slam tournaments
Australian Open	A	A	2R	A	1R	A	A	1R	0 / 3	1–3
French Open	A	A	2R	A	A	QF	2R^{[a]}	1R	0 / 4	4–3
Wimbledon	3R	2R	2R	1R	2R	1R	1R	A	0 / 7	5–7
US Open	A	A	A	1R	2R	A	A	A	0 / 2	1–2
Win–loss	2–1	1–1	3–3	0–2	2–3	2–2	1–1	0–2	0 / 16	10–15

Notes
^{a} 2018 French Open counts as 1 win, 0 losses. María José Martínez Sánchez and Marcelo Demoliner received a walkover in the second round, after Inglot and Johanna Konta withdrew.
