= Philipp Kohlschreiber =

German tennis player (born 1983)

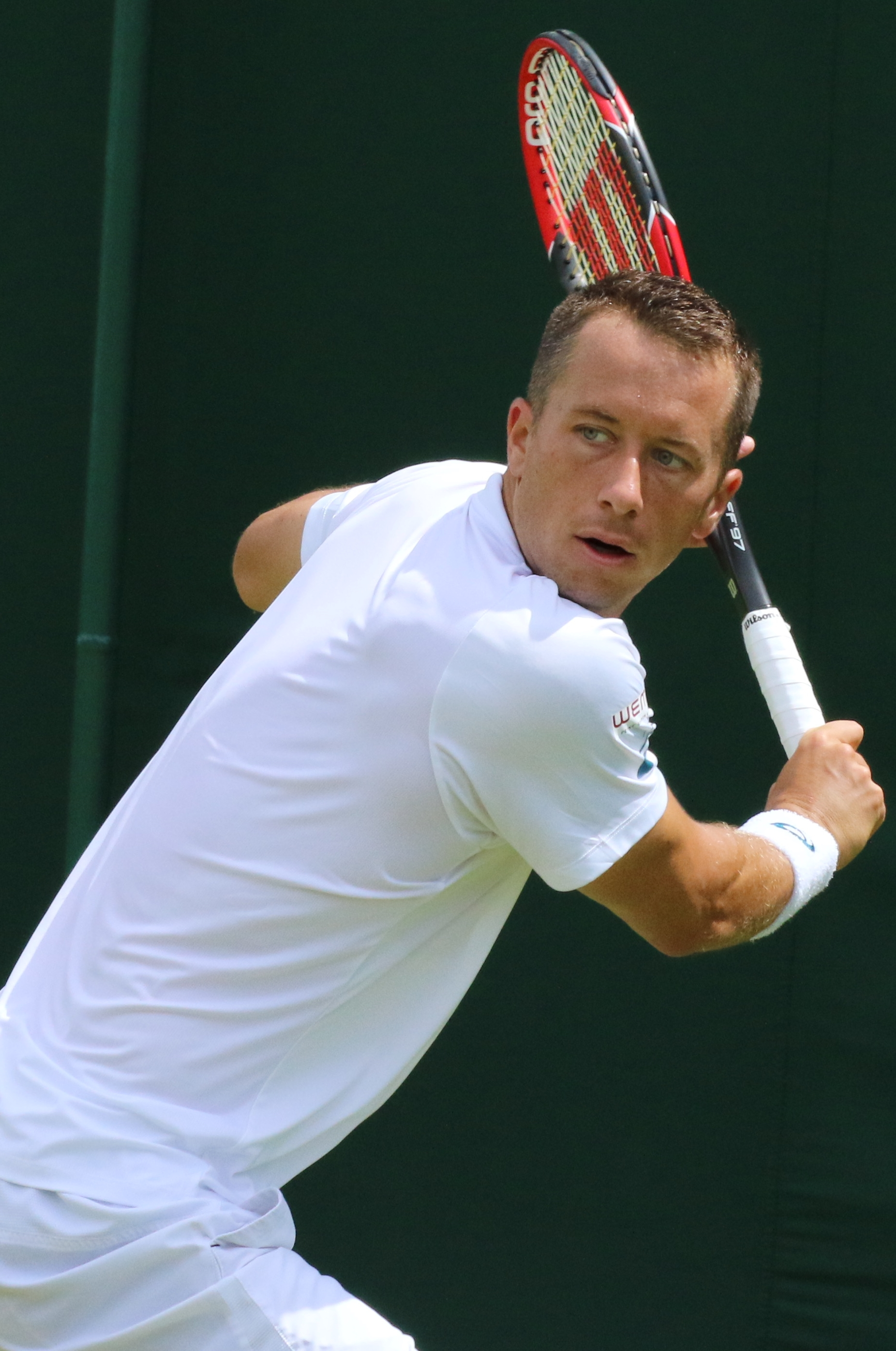
- Kohlschreiber at the 2016 Wimbledon Championships
- Full name: Philipp Eberhard Hermann Kohlschreiber
- Country (sports): Germany
- Residence: Kitzbühel, Austria
- Born: 16 October 1983 (age 42) Augsburg, West Germany
- Height: 1.78 m (5 ft 10 in)
- Turned pro: 2001
- Retired: 2022 (last doubles match 2026)
- Plays: Right-handed (one-handed backhand)
- Coach: Markus Hipfl
- Prize money: US $13,758,395: 49th all-time leader in earnings

Singles
- Career record: 478–387 (55.3%)
- Career titles: 8
- Highest ranking: No. 16 (30 July 2012)

Grand Slam singles results
- Australian Open: 4R (2005, 2008, 2012)
- French Open: 4R (2009, 2013)
- Wimbledon: QF (2012)
- US Open: 4R (2012, 2013, 2014, 2017, 2018)

Other tournaments
- Olympic Games: 2R (2016)

Doubles
- Career record: 98–118 (45.4%)
- Career titles: 7
- Highest ranking: No. 51 (10 November 2008)

Grand Slam doubles results
- Australian Open: 1R (2005, 2006, 2007, 2012)
- French Open: 1R (2007)
- Wimbledon: 1R (2006)
- US Open: 1R (2005, 2006, 2007, 2011)

Team competitions
- Davis Cup: SF (2007)

Philipp Eberhard Hermann Kohlschreiber (German pronunciation: [ˈfɪlɪp ˈkoːlʃʁaɪbɐ]; born 16 October 1983) is a German former professional tennis player. The right-hander won eight singles and seven doubles titles on the ATP World Tour and made the quarterfinals at the 2012 Wimbledon Championships. He reached his highest ATP singles ranking of world No. 16 in July 2012.

== Personal life ==
Kohlschreiber married his long-term girlfriend Lena Alberti on 1 August 2018 in Kitzbühel, Austria.

== Career ==
=== 2007: First ATP career title ===
In 2007, Kohlschreiber achieved his greatest result at an ATP Masters Series event during the Monte-Carlo Masters, when he reached the quarterfinals after going through qualifying, defeating world No. 12 David Nalbandian in the second round. He won his first career title in Munich defeating Mikhail Youzhny, thereby becoming the first German player to win the event since Michael Stich in 1994.

=== 2008: Four top-ten victories ===
Kohlschreiber started 2008 by reaching the quarterfinals of the tournament in Doha and winning his second career title in Auckland, where he defeated Juan Carlos Ferrero in the final.

After his win in Auckland, he defeated world No. 6, Andy Roddick, in the third round of the Australian Open 6–4, 3–6, 7–6, 6–7, 8–6. Kohlschreiber hit a personal record of 32 aces and 104 winners. He eventually lost in the fourth round to Jarkko Nieminen 6–3, 6–7, 6–7, 3–6. Kohlschreiber failed to convert 7 set points in the second set and 4 set points in the third.

He reached the final of the Gerry Weber Open in Halle, Germany, eventually falling to the four-time champion Roger Federer 3–6, 4–6. At the US Open, he had to retire in the match against Viktor Troicki.

=== 2009: 4th round at the French Open ===
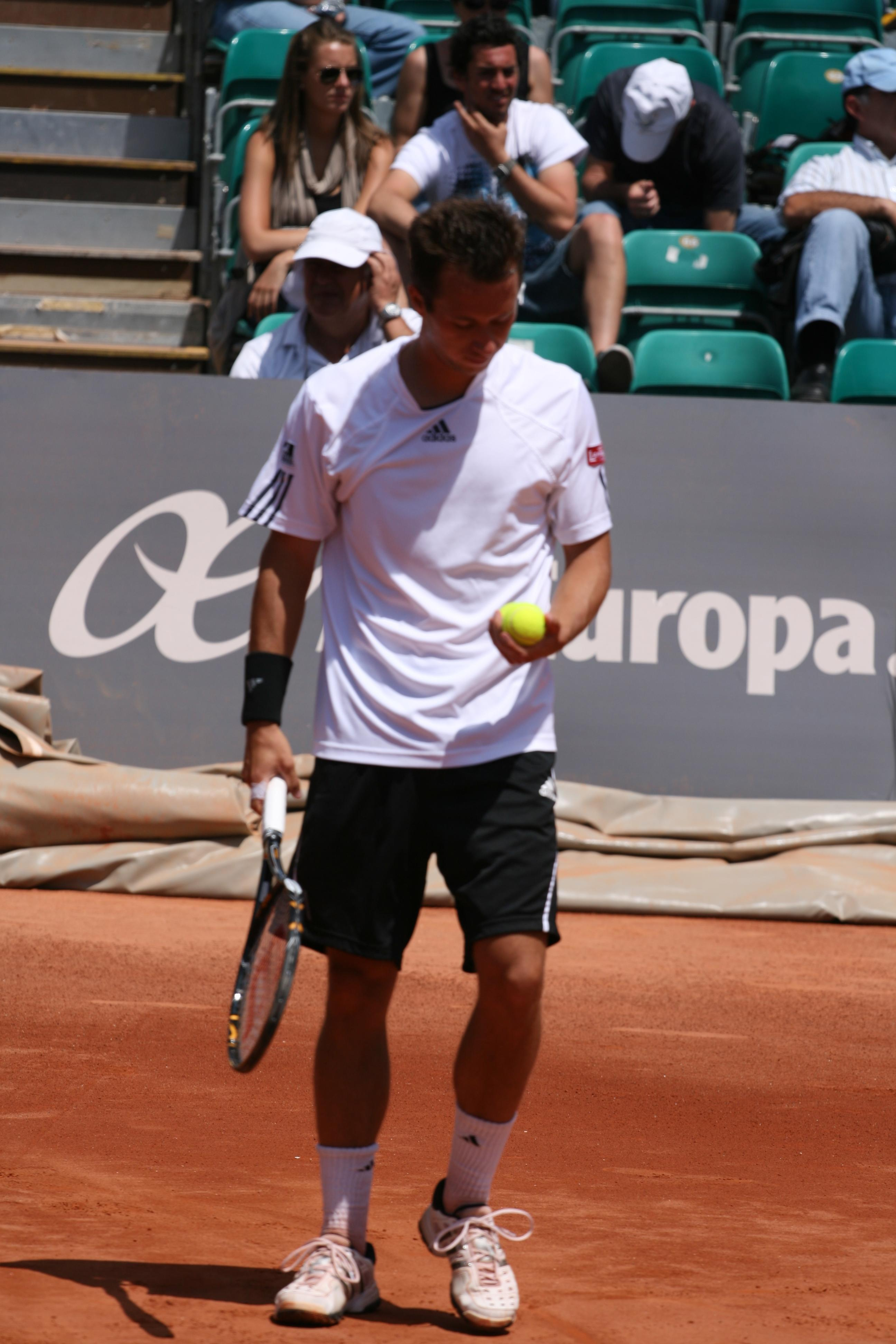
Kohlschreiber at the 2009 Madrid Masters

Kohlschreiber started 2009 by reaching the quarterfinals in Doha and Auckland. The German reached the second round at the Australian Open where he defeated Sam Querrey, before losing to Fabrice Santoro in five sets. In the BNP Paribas Open in Indian Wells, Kohlschreiber beat Nicolás Lapentti 6–2, 3–6, 6–3 before being defeated by Fernando Verdasco in the fourth round. Also in 2009, during the French Open, Kohlschreiber defeated world No. 4, Novak Djokovic, in a 6–4, 6–4, 6–4 upset.

In the third round of Wimbledon, he was defeated by Roger Federer 6–3, 6–2, 6–7, 6–1. He was the only person other than finalist Andy Roddick to take a set off of Federer, the eventual champion.

=== 2010: Quarterfinals in Monte Carlo and Canada Masters ===
Kohlschreiber started the season in Auckland well with three straight sets wins, including wins over Thomaz Bellucci and Frenchman Marc Gicquel before running into eventual finalist Arnaud Clément, losing in straight sets in the semifinals. Kohlschreiber progressed to the third round of the Australian Open with wins over Horacio Zeballos and Wayne Odesnik. He gave second seed Rafael Nadal a test in the third round, before losing 4–6, 2–6, 6–2, 5–7.

He returned to action in San Jose seeing off local boy Rajeev Ram in three sets and crushing Dudi Sela, only losing two games. He then ran into the in-form Denis Istomin and lost in three difficult sets, sparking a three-match losing streak. He crashed out of Memphis to Evgeny Korolev in two tight sets, followed by an easy three set lost to Gaël Monfils in the Davis Cup.

Kohlschreiber got back to winning ways at the BNP Paribas Open in Indian Wells as he had a bye then beat fellow German Philipp Petzschner in straight sets. He then lost a final set tie-breaker in round 3 to world No. 2, Djokovic. At the Sony Ericsson Open Kohlschreiber received another bye and took on fellow German Florian Mayer and it was about to go into a first set tie breaker before Florian retired with an injury. Again he went out in the third round this time to Jo-Wilfried Tsonga in straight sets.

To start his clay-court season, Kohlschreiber went to the Monte-Carlo Masters where he caused a couple of upsets. In the first round, he edged out Bellucci in a final set tie-break before he thumped the world No. 4, Andy Murray, for the loss of just three games. He then took on Petzschner, again and again, won in straight sets, to reach the quarterfinals. Where he played David Ferrer and was edged out in two tight sets.

At Wimbledon, Kohlschreiber defeated Potito Starace and Teymuraz Gabashvili, before losing to Andy Roddick in the third round. At Hamburg, he lost to Thomaz Bellucci in the third round. In September, he hired Murray's former coach Miles Maclagan.

=== 2011: Grand Slam struggles ===
Kohlschreiber began his year at the Qatar Open where he was the eighth seed. He won his first match against Andreas Seppi 6–2, 6–4 but then lost to Ivo Karlović in a tight match 7–6, 6–7, 7–6. He then went to the Heineken Open in Auckland where he won against Carlos Berlocq 2–6, 6–3, 6–1, and 6–4, 3–6, 6–2 against Marcel Granollers before falling to the top seed David Ferrer, 3–6, 7–6, 3–6, in the quarterfinals. In February, Kohlschreiber attended the ABN AMRO tournament in Rotterdam. In the first round, he faced Lu Yen-hsun of Taiwan whom he defeated 6–4, 7–6. In the second round, he put up a brave showing against top seed and world No. 4, Robin Söderling, but lost 6–3, 5–7, 7–6. In the first round of the Davis Cup tie against Croatia, Kohlschreiber saved one match point in the second rubber against Ivan Dodig to win in five sets and to draw the score after day one. In the fourth rubber, Marin Čilić was too strong for Kohlschreiber – he was defeated in straight sets to give the tie a 2–2. In the deciding fifth rubber Philipp Petzschner managed to lead Germany to a 3–2 win. After a first round bye in Indian Wells, Kohlschreiber defeated Tim Smyczek in Round two saving 3 MP before beating world No. 4, Robin Söderling, 7–6, 6–4, saving five set points in the opening set tie-break. In round 4, he lost to Juan Martín del Potro, 6–7, 6–7. Kohlschreiber was defeated by Federer in the second round of the Monte-Carlo Masters after beating Andrey Golubev in round 1. He captured his third career title at the Gerry Weber Open in Halle defeating Philipp Petzschner in the final. On the way to the title, he overcame Cedrik-Marcel Stebe, Alexandr Dolgopolov, Lleyton Hewitt and Gaël Monfils.

=== 2012: Quarterfinals at Wimbledon ===
At the Australian Open he lost in the fourth round to Juan Martín del Potro. Kohlschreiber reached the semifinals of Gerry Weber Open, defeating Rafael Nadal in the quarterfinals, 6–3, 6–4. He lost in the semifinals to Tommy Haas, 6–7, 5–7.

Less than two weeks following his defeat of Nadal, Kohlschreiber beat Tommy Haas, Malek Jaziri and then Lukáš Rosol in straight sets 6–2, 6–3, 7–6 in the third round of Wimbledon Championships. Rosol had defeated Nadal in the previous round of in one of the greatest upsets in Grand Slam history. Kohlschreiber then advanced to the quarterfinals of a major for the first time by defeating Brian Baker, but was thwarted by Jo-Wilfried Tsonga 7–6, 4–6, 7–6, 6–2. At the US Open, he lost in the fourth round to Janko Tipsarević.

=== 2013: Fourth round at French, US Open ===
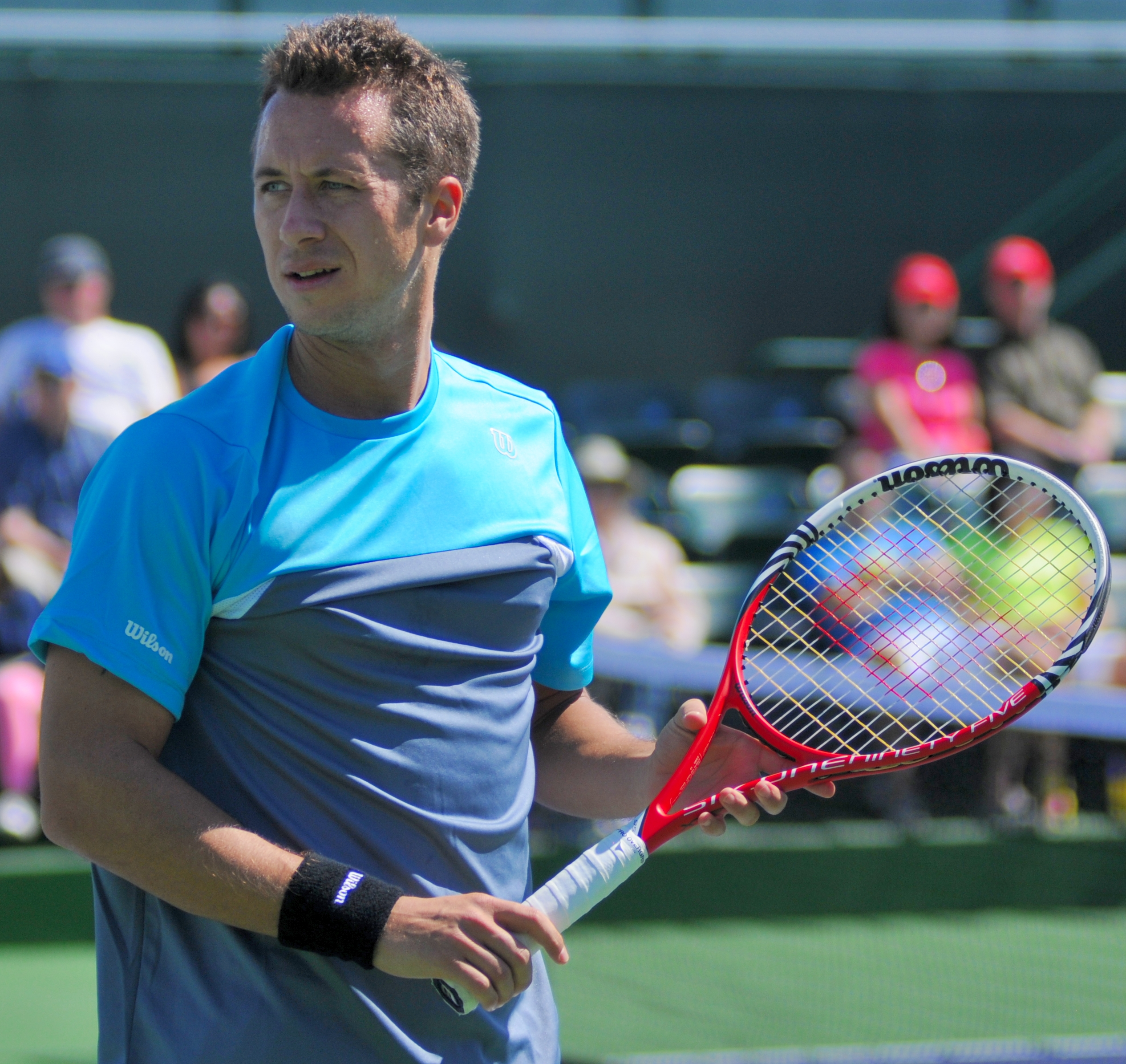
Kohlschreiber at the 2013 BNP Paribas Open

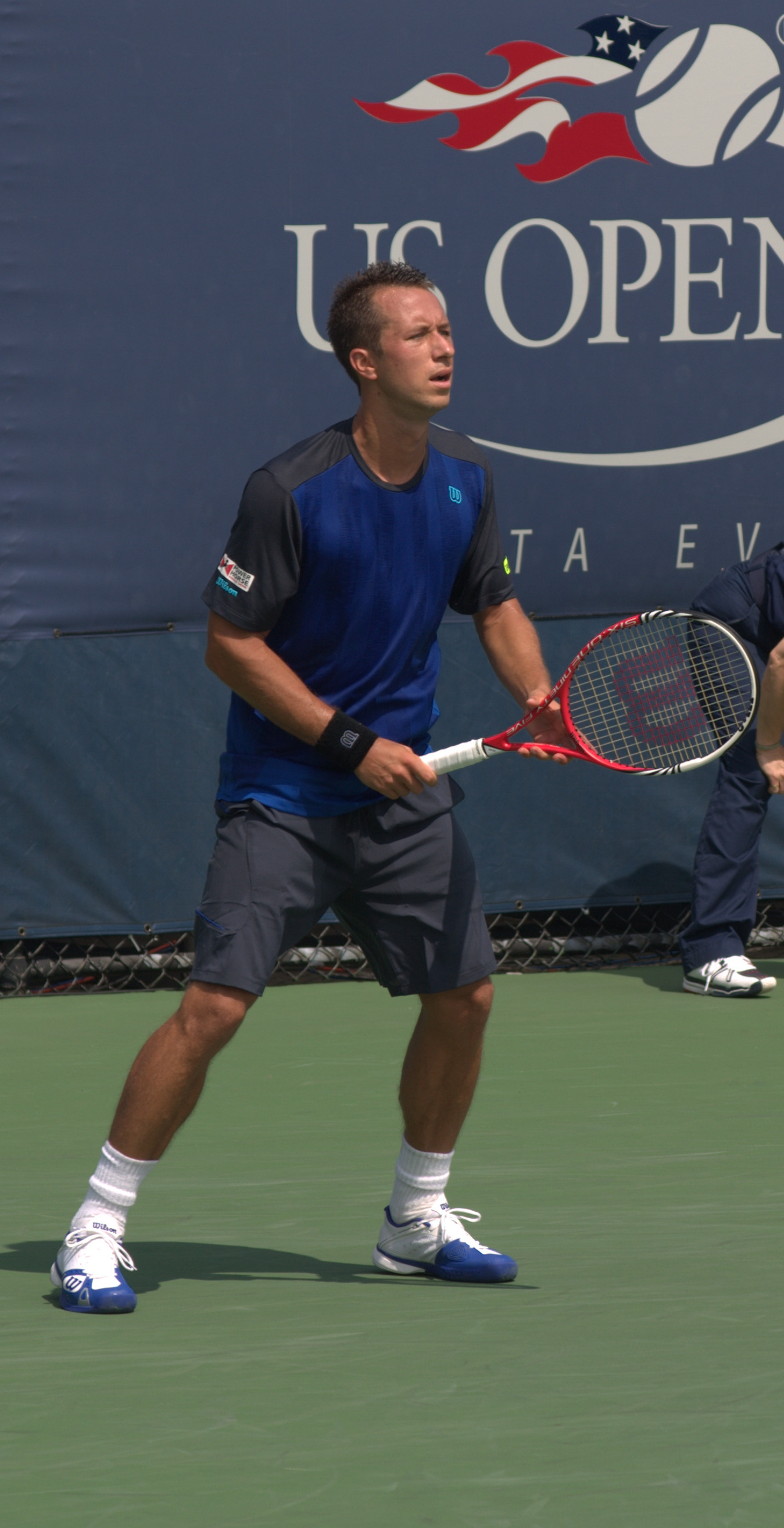
Philipp Kohlschreiber at the 2013 US Open

At the Australian Open, he lost in the third round to Milos Raonic. He made it to the fourth round of the French Open before losing to world number one, Novak Djokovic. At Wimbledon, he had to retire in his first-round match against Ivan Dodig. At the US Open, he lost in the fourth round to eventual champion Rafael Nadal.

=== 2014: Davis Cup quarterfinals ===
At the 2014 Rotterdam Open, Kohlschreiber defeated Richard Gasquet to reach quarterfinals, where he lost to Igor Sijsling. At Dubai, he won over Andreas Seppi in the second round and was defeated by Tomáš Berdych in the semifinals.

Kohlschreiber won the Düsseldorf Open, then the following week reached the third round of the French Open where he took reigning Wimbledon champion Andy Murray to five sets.

At Hamburg, he reached the semifinals winning over Gilles Simon and Lukáš Rosol. At the US Open, he defeated John Isner in the third round and lost to Djokovic in the round of 16.

=== 2015: Title in Kitzbühel ===
Kohlschreiber defeated Paul-Henri Mathieu in the first round of the Australian Open in straight sets for his first win of the season, before bowing out to Bernard Tomic in a tightly contested four-set match, 7–6, 4–6, 6–7, 6–7. He was very dominant against Japanese Go Soeda to begin the French Open, losing only three games, but could not get past Pablo Andújar despite winning sets three and four. He fell to Djokovic with a score of 4–6, 4–6, 4–6 in the first round of Wimbledon. Kohlschreiber then took part in Kitzbühel, defeating two top-30 players in Fabio Fognini and Dominic Thiem in the quarter- and semifinals, respectively. He then defeated Paul-Henri Mathieu to win the tournament. The US Open saw his best grand slam performance of the year, defeating countryman Alexander Zverev in five sets, and then taking down Lukas Rosol with a score of 7–6, 6–2, 6–2. Federer took down Kohlschreiber in straights in the third round, however.

=== 2016: Munich champion, Stuttgart runner-up, poor Grand Slam results ===
Kohlschreiber began 2016 ranked 34th in the world and had a season high rank of 22. He lost in the first round of the Australian Open to Kei Nishikori in straight sets. He played in the Sofia Open and lost to Victor Troicki in the quarterfinals. His next tournament was the Rotterdam Open where Kohlschreiber beat former US Open champion Marin Cilic in the quarterfinals. He then lost in the next round. Following the Rotterdam semifinals, Kohlschreiber made the quarterfinals of Dubai where he lost to Stan Wawrinka. Kohlschreiber then represented Germany in their Davis Cup team against the Czech Republic where he beat both Lukáš Rosol and Tomáš Berdych.

Kohlschreiber reached the round of 32 at both the Indian Wells Masters and the Monte-Carlo Masters where he lost to Djokovic and Wawrinka, respectively. He reached the semifinals in Barcelona before winning the Munich Open with wins against Mayer, del Potro, Fognini and Dominic Thiem in the final. He lost early at both Madrid Masters and the Rome Masters before a first-round loss at the French Open to Nicolás Almagro.

=== 2017: 400th win, Grand Slam fourth round since 2014 ===
Kohlschreiber started 2017 ranked No. 32. At the Australian Open, he won against Nikoloz Basilashvili and Donald Young, but lost in round 3 to Gael Monfils. In February, Kohlschreiber played in the Dubai Tennis Championships where he beat eighth seed Gilles Muller in straight sets. In the quarterfinals, Kohlschreiber who was aiming to win his 400th match on tour lost in three tight sets to eventual champion and world No. 1, Andy Murray. Kohlschreiber won the first set 7–6, and in the second set tiebreaker lost 18–20. In that tiebreaker, Kohlschreiber had seven match points. Murray saved all seven, won the tiebreaker and the deciding set 6–1.

Kohlschreiber finally won his 400th match at the BNP Paribas Open against Alexandr Dolgopolov. He subsequently lost his next match to eventual finalist Stan Wawrinka. Later that month at the Miami Open, as the 26th seed, Kohlschreiber won his second-round match in three sets against young American Taylor Fritz. In the third round, despite winning the first set 6–0, Kohlschreiber lost to 15 time Grand Slam champion Rafael Nadal. In August, Kohlschreiber won his second title at Kitzbuhel.

Originally for the US Open, Kohlschreiber was to be unseeded; however, the last-minute withdrawal of Andy Murray saw a draw reshuffle with Kohlschreiber becoming the 33rd seed. Kohlschreiber reached the round of 16 where he lost to Roger Federer, world No. 3, in straight sets. Kohlschreiber did not drop a set in reaching the round of 16.

=== 2019–2021: Loss of form; continued struggles in 2020; out of top 100 in 2021 ===
Kohlschreiber won his first match against a current world No. 1 at the 2019 Indian Wells Masters, where he beat Novak Djokovic in the third round in straight sets (his first win over Djokovic since 2009). He lost in the next round against Gaël Monfils.

After an extended period of playing on the Challenger tour, winning the 2020 Apis Canberra International, he struggled with form and was not able to pass the first round in multiple Grand Slams, except for the 2020 Australian Open where he withdrew in the second round, Kohlschreiber found his form at the 2021 French Open using his protected ranking where he reached the third round of this major for the first time in seven years, since 2014. He defeated Fernando Verdasco and 24th seed Aslan Karatsev before falling to 10th seed and 2020 French Open semifinalist Diego Schwartzman.

He lost in the first round at the 2021 Wimbledon Championships to Denis Shapovalov, where he also used his protected ranking, after a hard-fought five setter lasting more than 3 1/2 hours.

At the 2021 US Open Kohlschreiber reached the second round, using his protected ranking once more, after Marin Cilic retired in the first round in the fifth set. It was Cilic's first retirement in more than 800 matches on the tour.

=== 2022: 68th Grand Slam appearance, retirement ===
He competed in his 68th Grand Slam at the Australian Open and reached the second round. Unable to defend his third round showing at Roland Garros from the year before, and despite qualifying at Indian Wells earlier in the season, he fell out of the top 150 on 6 June 2022. On 20 June, after winning the first round of the Wimbledon qualifying, he announced his retirement from professional tennis after that tournament. He played his last match on the ATP Tour two days later, losing to Mikhail Kukushkin in the next round. As of 30 April 2026, he is in 10th place on the list of Grand Slam appearances overall with 68 tied with Rafael Nadal.

=== 2026: Brief comeback ===
Almost four years after his last match, Kohlschreiber made a brief comeback in the doubles event at the Upper Austria Open partnering Joel Schwärzler who he had been helping to coach with the pair making it through to the quarterfinals where they lost to eventual finalists Àlex Martínez and Bruno Pujol Navarro in a super tiebreak.

== Performance timelines ==
Key
W	F	SF	QF	#R	RR	Q#	P#	DNQ	A	Z#	PO	G	S	B	NMS	NTI	P	NH

(W) winner; (F) finalist; (SF) semifinalist; (QF) quarterfinalist; (#R) rounds 4, 3, 2, 1; (RR) round-robin stage; (Q#) qualification round; (P#) preliminary round; (DNQ) did not qualify; (A) absent; (Z#) Davis/Fed Cup Zonal Group (with number indication) or (PO) play-off; (G) gold, (S) silver or (B) bronze Olympic/Paralympic medal; (NMS) not a Masters tournament; (NTI) not a Tier I tournament; (P) postponed; (NH) not held; (SR) strike rate (events won / competed); (W–L) win–loss record.
To avoid confusion and double counting, these charts are updated at the conclusion of a tournament or when the player's participation has ended.

=== Singles ===
Tournament	2001	2002	2003	2004	2005	2006	2007	2008	2009	2010	2011	2012	2013	2014	2015	2016	2017	2018	2019	2020	2021	2022	SR	W–L	Win %
Grand Slam tournaments
Australian Open	A	A	A	A	4R	2R	2R	4R	2R	3R	2R	4R	3R	A	2R	1R	3R	1R	2R	2R	A	2R	0 / 16	23–15	61%
French Open	A	A	A	Q2	1R	2R	2R	1R	4R	3R	1R	2R	4R	3R	2R	1R	1R	1R	2R	1R	3R	Q1	0 / 17	16–17	48%
Wimbledon	A	A	A	A	1R	3R	1R	1R	3R	3R	1R	QF	1R	2R	1R	1R	1R	3R	1R	NH	1R	Q2	0 / 16	13–16	45%
US Open	A	A	1R	2R	1R	1R	3R	2R	3R	2R	1R	4R	4R	4R	3R	1R	4R	4R	1R	1R	2R	A	0 / 19	25–19	57%
Win–loss	0–0	0–0	0–1	1–1	3–4	4–4	4–4	4–4	8–4	7–4	1–4	11–4	7–4	6–3	4–4	0–4	5–4	5–4	2–4	1–2	3–3	1–1	0 / 68	77–67	53%
National representation
Summer Olympics	not held			A	not held			A	not held			A	not held			2R	not held				1R	NH	0 / 2	1–1	50%
Davis Cup	A	A	A	A	A	A	SF	QF	QF	1R	QF	A	1R	QF	1R	1R	1R	QF	QF	QR	A	A	0 / 12	20–14	59%
ATP Tour Masters 1000
Indian Wells Masters	A	A	A	Q1	Q1	3R	2R	3R	4R	3R	4R	2R	2R	2R	3R	3R	3R	QF	4R	NH	1R	1R	0 / 16	20–15	57%
Miami Open	A	A	A	Q1	1R	A	A	2R	1R	3R	2R	3R	2R	2R	A	A	3R	A	A	NH	A	A	0 / 9	3–9	25%
Monte-Carlo Masters	A	A	A	A	Q1	A	QF	3R	2R	QF	2R	2R	3R	2R	2R	2R	A	3R	2R	NH	A	A	0 / 12	19–12	61%
Madrid Open	NH	A	A	A	A	A	A	2R	3R	1R	A	1R	A	1R	2R	1R	1R	3R	2R	NH	A	A	0 / 10	7–9	44%
Italian Open	A	A	A	A	A	A	A	A	2R	2R	2R	1R	3R	3R	2R	2R	A	3R	3R	A	A	A	0 / 10	13–9	59%
Canadian Open	A	A	A	A	A	A	1R	1R	2R	QF	1R	3R	1R	1R	A	A	A	A	A	NH	A	A	0 / 8	5–8	38%
Cincinnati Masters	A	A	A	A	A	A	2R	QF	1R	3R	3R	1R	2R	2R	1R	A	A	1R	Q2	A	A	A	0 / 10	10–9	53%
Shanghai Masters	not held								1R	1R	A	2R	2R	A	A	1R	A	A	A	NH			0 / 5	2–5	29%
Paris Masters	A	A	A	A	A	A	A	3R	1R	1R	2R	1R	3R	2R	A	1R	A	2R	A	A	A	A	0 / 9	7–9	44%
German Open	Q1	1R	A	A	1R	1R	2R	1R	not Masters series														0 / 5	1–5	17%
Win–loss	0–0	0–1	0–0	0–0	0–2	2–2	6–5	9–8	8–8	11–8	7–7	5–8	8–7	5–8	4–5	3–6	2–3	10–6	7–4	0–0	0–1	0–1	0 / 94	87–90	49%
Career statistics
	2001	2002	2003	2004	2005	2006	2007	2008	2009	2010	2011	2012	2013	2014	2015	2016	2017	2018	2019	2020	2021	2022	Career		
Tournaments	0	2	3	10	25	20	23	20	26	24	23	25	25	26	23	24	21	22	21	7	9	3	382		
Titles	0	0	0	0	0	0	1	1	0	0	1	1	0	1	1	1	1	0	0	0	0	0	8		
Finals	0	0	0	0	0	0	1	2	1	0	1	2	3	1	2	2	2	1	0	0	0	0	18		
Hard win–loss	0–0	0–0	0–1	4–5	6–10	7–6	12–13	21–14	20–15	21–14	17–16	20–14	16–14	18–14	13–12	15–12	17–10	11–11	12–11	2–4	2–4	1–2	1 / 203	235–202	54%
Clay win–loss	0–0	0–3	1–2	2–5	2–9	10–9	16–10	7–5	15–8	12–8	9–10	13–7	14–8	15–9	17–8	11–7	12–6	10–10	9–8	0–3	3–3	0–1	6 / 131	178–139	56%
Grass win–loss	0–0	0–0	0–0	0–0	4–3	4–3	3–3	4–2	5–2	4–2	5–1	9–3	2–3	4–2	2–3	6–2	3–3	3–3	0–3	0–0	2–2	0–0	1 / 42	60–40	60%
Carpet win–loss	0–0	0–0	0–0	0–0	0–3	3–2	2–1	0–0	discontinued														0 / 6	5–6	45%
Overall win–loss	0–0	0–3	1–3	6–10	12–25	24–20	33–27	32–21	40–25	37–24	31–27	42–24	32–25	37–25	32–23	32–21	32–19	24–24	21–22	2–7	7–9	1–3	8 / 382	478–387	55%
Win %	–	0%	25%	38%	32%	55%	55%	60%	62%	61%	53%	64%	56%	60%	58%	60%	63%	50%	48%	22%	44%	25%	55.26%		
Year-end ranking	759	247	208	88	86	62	32	28	27	34	43	20	22	24	34	32	29	34	79	98	114	416	$ 13,724,265		

- Kohlschreiber's second-round match at the 2013 French Open was a walkover (so doesn't count as a win).
- Kohlschreiber withdrew before the second round match at the 2020 Australian Open due to an injury (so doesn't count as a loss).

=== Doubles ===
Tournament	2001	2002	2003	2004	2005	2006	2007	2008	2009	2010	2011	2012	2013	2014	2015	2016	2017	2018	2019	2020	2021	2022	SR	W–L
Grand Slam tournaments
Australian Open	A	A	A	A	1R	1R	1R	A	A	A	A	1R	A	A	A	A	A	A	A	A	A	A	0 / 4	0–4
French Open	A	A	A	A	A	A	1R	A	A	A	A	A	A	A	A	A	A	A	A	A	A	A	0 / 1	0–1
Wimbledon	A	A	A	A	A	1R	A	A	A	A	A	A	A	A	A	A	A	A	A	NH	A	A	0 / 1	0–1
US Open	A	A	A	A	1R	1R	1R	A	A	A	1R	A	A	A	A	A	A	A	A	A	A	A	0 / 4	0–4
Win–loss	0–0	0–0	0–0	0–0	0–2	0–3	0–3	0–0	0–0	0–0	0–1	0–1	0–0	0–0	0–0	0–0	0–0	0–0	0–0	0–0	0–0	0–0	0 / 10	0–10
National representation
Davis Cup	A	A	A	A	A	A	SF	QF	QF	1R	QF	A	1R	QF	1R	1R	1R	QF	QF	QR	A	A	0 / 12	4–3
ATP Tour Masters 1000
Indian Wells Masters	A	A	A	A	A	A	A	1R	A	2R	1R	1R	A	1R	A	QF	1R	1R	A	NH	A	A	0 / 8	3–8
Miami Open	A	A	A	A	A	A	A	A	1R	1R	1R	A	1R	A	A	A	A	A	A	NH	A	A	0 / 4	0–4
Monte-Carlo Masters	A	A	A	A	A	A	A	QF	A	1R	A	A	2R	A	2R	1R	A	A	1R	NH	A	A	0 / 6	4–6
Madrid Open	NH	A	A	A	A	A	A	A	A	A	A	A	A	A	A	A	1R	A	A	NH	A	A	0 / 1	0–1
Italian Open	A	A	A	A	A	A	A	A	A	A	A	A	A	A	A	QF	A	A	A	A	A	A	0 / 1	2–1
Canadian Open	A	A	A	A	A	A	A	A	1R	QF	A	1R	2R	A	A	A	A	A	A	NH	A	A	0 / 4	3–4
Cincinnati Masters	A	A	A	A	A	A	A	A	2R	1R	A	1R	1R	1R	A	A	A	SF	A	A	A	A	0 / 6	4–5
Shanghai Masters	not held								1R	1R	A	A	1R	A	A	A	A	A	A	NH			0 / 3	0–2
Paris Masters	A	A	A	A	A	A	A	A	QF	1R	A	1R	A	A	A	2R	A	A	A	A	A	A	0 / 4	3–4
German Open	A	A	A	A	A	A	1R	A	not Masters series														0 / 1	0–1
Win–loss	0–0	0–0	0–0	0–0	0–0	0–0	0–1	2–2	3–3	3–7	0–2	0–4	2–5	0–2	1–1	5–4	0–2	3–2	0–1	0–0	0–0	0–0	0 / 38	19–36
Career statistics
	2001	2002	2003	2004	2005	2006	2007	2008	2009	2010	2011	2012	2013	2014	2015	2016	2017	2018	2019	2020	2021	2022	Career	
Tournaments	0	0	0	2	9	6	13	9	14	13	8	10	11	7	4	6	7	5	3	0	0	1	128	
Titles	0	0	0	0	1	1	1	2	1	0	0	0	1	0	0	0	0	0	0	0	0	0	7	
Finals	0	0	0	0	1	1	1	4	1	0	0	1	1	0	0	0	0	0	0	0	0	0	10	
Overall win–loss	0–0	0–0	0–0	2–1	8–8	6–4	8–12	17–8	17–11	5–15	7–7	3–10	8–10	5–7	2–4	5–7	0–6	3–5	2–2	0–0	0–0	0–1	98–118	
Win %	–	–	–	67%	50%	60%	40%	68%	61%	25%	50%	23%	44%	42%	33%	42%	0%	38%	50%	–	–	0%	45.37%	
Year-end ranking	582	1290	803	346	124	148	139	53	74	197	164	328	138	288	563	167	555	176	289	–	–	–		

== ATP career finals ==
=== Singles: 18 (8 titles, 10 runner-ups) ===
Legend Grand Slam tournaments (0–0) ATP Tour Finals (0–0) ATP Tour Masters 1000 (0–0) ATP Tour 500 series (0–0) ATP International Series / ATP Tour 250 Series (8–10)	Finals by surface Hard (1–2) Clay (6–6) Grass (1–2) Carpet (0–0)

Result	W–L	Date	Tournament	Tier	Surface	Opponent	Score
Win	1–0	Apr 2007	Bavarian Championships, Germany	International	Clay	(Russia) Mikhail Youzhny	2–6, 6–3, 6–4
Win	2–0	Jan 2008	Auckland Open, New Zealand	International	Hard	(Spain) Juan Carlos Ferrero	7–6^{(7–4)}, 7–5
Loss	2–1	Jun 2008	Halle Open, Germany	International	Grass	(Switzerland) Roger Federer	3–6, 4–6
Loss	2–2	Sep 2009	Moselle Open, France	250 Series	Hard (i)	(France) Gaël Monfils	6–7^{(1–7)}, 6–3, 2–6
Win	3–2	Jun 2011	Halle Open, Germany	250 Series	Grass	(Germany) Philipp Petzschner	7–6^{(7–5)}, 2–0 ret.
Win	4–2	May 2012	Bavarian Championships, Germany (2)	250 Series	Clay	(Croatia) Marin Čilić	7–6^{(10–8)}, 6–3
Loss	4–3	Jul 2012	Kitzbühel Open, Austria	250 Series	Clay	(Netherlands) Robin Haase	7–6^{(7–2)}, 3–6, 2–6
Loss	4–4	Jan 2013	Auckland Open, New Zealand	250 Series	Hard	(Spain) David Ferrer	6–7^{(5–7)}, 1–6
Loss	4–5	May 2013	Bavarian Championships, Germany	250 Series	Clay	(Germany) Tommy Haas	3–6, 6–7^{(3–7)}
Loss	4–6	Jul 2013	Stuttgart Open, Germany	250 Series	Clay	(Italy) Fabio Fognini	7–5, 4–6, 4–6
Win	5–6	May 2014	Düsseldorf Open, Germany	250 Series	Clay	(Croatia) Ivo Karlović	6–2, 7–6^{(7–4)}
Loss	5–7	May 2015	Bavarian Championships, Germany	250 Series	Clay	(United Kingdom) Andy Murray	6–7^{(4–7)}, 7–5, 6–7^{(4–7)}
Win	6–7	Aug 2015	Kitzbühel Open, Austria	250 Series	Clay	(France) Paul-Henri Mathieu	2–6, 6–2, 6–2
Win	7–7	May 2016	Bavarian Championships, Germany (3)	250 Series	Clay	(Austria) Dominic Thiem	7–6^{(9–7)}, 4–6, 7–6^{(7–4)}
Loss	7–8	Jun 2016	Stuttgart Open, Germany	250 Series	Grass	(Austria) Dominic Thiem	7–6^{(7–2)}, 4–6, 4–6
Loss	7–9	Apr 2017	Grand Prix Hassan II, Morocco	250 Series	Clay	(Croatia) Borna Ćorić	7–5, 6–7^{(3–7)}, 5–7
Win	8–9	Aug 2017	Kitzbühel Open, Austria (2)	250 Series	Clay	(Portugal) João Sousa	6–3, 6–4
Loss	8–10	May 2018	Bavarian Championships, Germany	250 Series	Clay	(Germany) Alexander Zverev	3–6, 3–6

=== Doubles: 10 (7 titles, 3 runner-ups) ===
Legend Grand Slam tournaments (0–0) ATP Tour Finals (0–0) ATP Tour Masters 1000 (0–0) ATP International Series Gold / ATP Tour 500 Series (2–1) ATP International Series / ATP Tour 250 Series (5–2)	Finals by surface Hard (2–3) Clay (3–0) Grass (1–0) Carpet (1–0)

Result	W–L	Date	Tournament	Tier	Surface	Partner	Opponents	Score
Win	1–0	Sep 2005	Kingfisher Open, Vietnam	International	Carpet (i)	(Germany) Lars Burgsmüller	(Australia) Ashley Fisher (Sweden) Robert Lindstedt	5–6^{(3–7)}, 6–4, 6–2 (Note: Tie-breaks were held at 5–5 and not 6–6 in this tournament.)
Win	2–0	Jul 2006	Kitzbühel Open, Austria	Intl. Gold	Clay	(Austria) Stefan Koubek	(Austria) Oliver Marach (Czech Republic) Cyril Suk	6–2, 6–3
Win	3–0	Apr 2007	Bavarian Championships, Germany	International	Clay	(Russia) Mikhail Youzhny	(Czech Republic) Jan Hájek (Czech Republic) Jaroslav Levinský	6–1, 6–4
Win	4–0	Jan 2008	Doha, Qatar	International	Hard	(Czech Republic) David Škoch	(South Africa) Jeff Coetzee (South Africa) Wesley Moodie	6–4, 4–6, [11–9]
Loss	4–1	Feb 2008	Rotterdam Open, Netherlands	Intl. Gold	Hard (i)	(Russia) Mikhail Youzhny	(Czech Republic) Tomáš Berdych (Russia) Dmitry Tursunov	5–7, 6–3, [7–10]
Win	5–1	Jul 2008	Stuttgart Open, Germany	Intl. Gold	Clay	(Germany) Christopher Kas	(Germany) Michael Berrer (Germany) Mischa Zverev	6–3, 6–4
Loss	5–2	Oct 2008	Swiss Indoors, Switzerland	International	Hard (i)	(Germany) Christopher Kas	(India) Mahesh Bhupati (The Bahamas) Mark Knowles	3–6, 3–6
Win	6–2	Jun 2009	Halle Open, Germany	250 Series	Grass	(Germany) Christopher Kas	(Germany) Andreas Beck (Switzerland) Marco Chiudinelli	6–3, 6–4
Loss	6–3	Jan 2012	Doha, Qatar	250 Series	Hard	(Germany) Christopher Kas	(Slovakia) Filip Polášek (Czech Republic) Lukáš Rosol	3–6, 4–6
Win	7–3	Jan 2013	Doha, Qatar (2)	250 Series	Hard	(Germany) Christopher Kas	(Austria) Julian Knowle (Slovakia) Filip Polášek	7–5, 6–4

=== Team competition: 2 (1 title, 1 runner-up) ===
Result	W–L	Year	Tournament	Surface	Partners	Opponents	Score
Loss	0–1	2009	World Team Cup, Germany	Clay	(Germany) Nicolas Kiefer (Germany) Rainer Schüttler (Germany) Mischa Zverev	(Serbia) Janko Tipsarević (Serbia) Viktor Troicki (Serbia) Nenad Zimonjić	1–2
Win	1–1	2011	World Team Cup, Germany	Clay	(Germany) Florian Mayer (Germany) Philipp Petzschner (Germany) Christopher Kas	(Argentina) Juan Mónaco (Argentina) Juan Ignacio Chela (Argentina) Máximo González	2–1

== ATP Challenger and ITF Futures finals ==
=== Singles: 10 (5–5) ===
ATP Challenger (4–4)
ITF Futures (1–1)

Result	W–L	Date	Tournament	Tier	Surface	Opponent	Score
Win	1–0	Sep 2002	Netherlands F1, Enschede	Futures	Clay	(Japan) Jun Kato	6–1, 6–7^{(3–7)}, 6–3
Loss	1–1	Oct 2002	Jamaica F16, Montego Bay	Futures	Hard	(France) Cedric Kauffmann	2–6, 2–6
Win	1–0	Oct 2003	Tumkur, India	Challenger	Hard	(United Kingdom) Lee Childs	7–5, 7–6^{(7–5)}
Loss	1–1	Jun 2004	Reggio Emilia, Italy	Challenger	Clay	(France) Olivier Mutis	2–6, 6–0, 3–6
Win	2–1	Jul 2004	Hilversum, Netherlands	Challenger	Clay	(Netherlands) Dennis van Scheppingen	4–6, 6–4, 6–4
Loss	2–2	Nov 2004	Réunion Island	Challenger	Hard	(Czech Republic) Michal Tabara	1–6, 6–2, 4–6
Loss	2–3	Jun 2005	Fürth, Germany	Challenger	Clay	(Spain) Albert Portas	6–7^{(5–7)}, 2–6
Win	3–3	Nov 2005	Réunion Island	Challenger	Hard	(Russia) Teymuraz Gabashvili	6–2, 6–3
Loss	3–4	Sep 2011	Istanbul, Turkey	Challenger	Hard	(Uzbekistan) Denis Istomin	6–7^{(6–8)}, 4–6
Win	4–4	Jan 2020	Canberra, Australia	Challenger	Hard	(Finland) Emil Ruusuvuori	7–6^{(7–5)}, 4–6, 6–3

=== Doubles: 1 (1–0) ===
ATP Challenger (0–0)
ITF Futures (1–0)

Result	W–L	Date	Tournament	Tier	Surface	Partner	Opponents	Score
Win	1–0	Mar 2003	France F6, Lille	Futures	Hard (i)	(Germany) Markus Wislsperger	(France) Jérôme Hanquez (France) Régis Lavergne	6–4, 6–4

== Playing style ==
Kohlschreiber is an all-court player with an emphasis on baseline play. He has strong groundstrokes on both wings which are equally as solid and is often able to wrong-foot opponents due to his quick follow-through, forcing them to commit early. His forehand is his primary weapon, and he is known to hit inside-out forehands to draw opponents out, while his single-handed backhand is considered one of the best on the tour currently. It is known for its consistency, power, and his ability to hit it in a variety of ways, namely flat, with top-spin and slice. Generally playing from the baseline, Kohlschreiber constructs points and uses a sudden injection of pace or a drop-shot to draw opponents out of their comfort zone and dominate the point from there.

Complementing his strong baseline play, as an all-court player, Kohlschreiber is also a proficient volleyer and uses variety to construct points. He is known to employ drop-shots mid-rally to catch opponents off-guard, especially on the backhand side. He occasionally uses a chip-and-charge tactic as well, especially on grass. It is due to the variety of shots he has that has led him to be successful on all surfaces, as can be seen by the fact that he has reached at least the fourth round of all Grand Slam tournaments and won titles on all surfaces (although he has won the most titles on clay).

== Wins over top 10 players ==
- He has a 25–103 record against players who were, at the time the match was played, ranked in the top 10.

Season	2001	2002	2003	2004	2005	2006	2007	2008	2009	2010	2011	2012	2013	2014	2015	2016	2017	2018	2019	2020	2021	2022	Total
Wins	0	0	0	1	1	2	2	4	3	2	2	3	0	1	0	1	0	2	1	0	0	0	25

#	Player	Rank	Event	Surface	Rd	Score	PK Rank
2004
1.	(Germany) Rainer Schüttler	6	Dubai, United Arab Emirates	Hard	1R	3–6, 6–4, 6–4	164
2005
2.	(Sweden) Joachim Johansson	10	Halle, Germany	Grass	1R	7–6^{(7–4)}, 6–1	71
2006
3.	(Australia) Lleyton Hewitt	4	Adelaide, Australia	Hard	2R	6–3, 0–6, 7–5	86
4.	(Russia) Nikolay Davydenko	6	's-Hertogenbosch, Netherlands	Grass	1R	6–2, 6–4	96
2007
5.	(United States) James Blake	8	Halle, Germany	Grass	QF	6–4, 6–3	34
6.	(Russia) Nikolay Davydenko	4	Davis Cup, Moscow	Clay (i)	SF	6–7^{(5–7)}, 6–2, 6–2, 4–6, 7–5	32
2008
7.	(United States) Andy Roddick	6	Australian Open, Melbourne	Hard	3R	6–4, 3–6, 7–6^{(11–9)}, 6–7^{(3–7)}, 8–6	27
8.	(Spain) David Ferrer	5	World Team Cup, Düsseldorf	Clay	RR	6–1, 6–0	35
9.	(United States) James Blake	7	Halle, Germany	Grass	SF	6–3, 7–5	40
10.	(Spain) David Ferrer	5	Paris Masters, France	Hard (i)	2R	6–3, 6–2	30
2009
11.	(France) Jo-Wilfried Tsonga	9	World Team Cup, Düsseldorf	Clay	RR	6–7^{(2–7)}, 6–3, 6–3	31
12.	(Serbia) Novak Djokovic	4	French Open, Paris	Clay	3R	6–4, 6–4, 6–4	31
13.	(Spain) Fernando Verdasco	9	Davis Cup, Marbella	Clay	QF	6–4, 6–2, 1–6, 2–6, 8–6	29
2010
14.	(United Kingdom) Andy Murray	4	Monte-Carlo Masters, Monaco	Clay	2R	6–2, 6–1	33
15.	(Spain) Fernando Verdasco	9	Beijing, China	Hard	1R	6–2, 7–5	32
2011
16.	(Sweden) Robin Söderling	4	Indian Wells, United States	Hard	3R	7–6^{(10–8)}, 6–4	35
17.	(France) Gaël Monfils	8	Halle, Germany	Grass	SF	6–3, 6–3	49
2012
18.	(Spain) Nicolas Almagro	10	Auckland, New Zealand	Hard	QF	7–6^{(7–5)}, 6–4	42
19.	(Spain) Rafael Nadal	2	Halle, Germany	Grass	QF	6–3, 6–4	34
20.	(United States) John Isner	10	US Open, New York	Hard	3R	6–4, 3–6, 4–6, 6–3, 6–4	20
2014
21.	(France) Richard Gasquet	9	Rotterdam, Netherlands	Hard (i)	2R	7–5, 7–5	27
2016
22.	(Czech Republic) Tomáš Berdych	7	Davis Cup, Hanover	Hard (i)	1R	6–3, 7–5, ret.	30
2018
23.	(Croatia) Marin Cilic	3	Indian Wells, United States	Hard	3R	6–4, 6–4	37
24.	(Germany) Alexander Zverev	4	US Open, New York	Hard	3R	6–7^{(1–7)}, 6–4, 6–1, 6–3	34
2019
25.	(Serbia) Novak Djokovic	1	Indian Wells, United States	Hard	3R	6–4, 6–4	39

== Record against top 10 players ==
Kohlschreiber's ATP-only record against players who have been ranked world No. 10 or higher.

- Statistics correct as of 8 January 2024.

Player	Years	Matches	Record	Win %	Hard	Clay	Grass	Carpet
Number 1 ranked players								
(Austria) Thomas Muster	2011	1	1–0	100%	–	1–0	–	–
(Spain) Juan Carlos Ferrero	2006–09	4	3–1	75%	2–0	1–1	–	–
(Australia) Lleyton Hewitt	2002–11	4	2–2	50%	1–1	0–1	1–0	–
(Russia) Daniil Medvedev	2017–18	2	1–1	50%	1–1	–	–	–
(Spain) Carlos Moyá	2007–08	2	1–1	50%	1–1	–	–	–
(United States) Andy Roddick	2003–11	6	2–4	33%	2–2	0–1	0–1	–
(United Kingdom) Andy Murray	2010–17	6	1–5	17%	0–2	1–3	–	–
(Serbia) Novak Djokovic	2008–20	14	2–12	14%	1–6	1–4	0–2	–
(Spain) Rafael Nadal	2007–18	16	1–15	6%	0–8	0–7	1–0	–
(Switzerland) Roger Federer	2005–19	14	0–14	0%	0–8	0–1	0–5	–
Number 2 ranked players								
(Norway) Casper Ruud	2017	1	1–0	100%	–	1–0	–	–
(Germany) Alexander Zverev	2015–18	5	3–2	60%	2–0	1–1	0–1	–
(Germany) Tommy Haas	2008–13	7	4–3	57%	2–0	0–1	2–2	–
(Spain) Àlex Corretja	2002	1	0–1	0%	–	0–1	–	–
Number 3 ranked players								
(Austria) Dominic Thiem	2015–16	3	2–1	67%	–	2–0	0–1	–
(Croatia) Marin Čilić	2007–21	13	8–5	62%	6–3	2–1	0–1	–
(Russia) Nikolay Davydenko	2006–09	5	2–3	40%	0–2	1–1	1–0	–
(Argentina) David Nalbandian	2003–07	3	1–2	33%	0–2	1–0	–	–
(Canada) Milos Raonic	2013–19	3	1–2	33%	0–2	1–0	–	–
(Argentina) Juan Martín del Potro	2007–18	9	2–7	22%	0–6	2–1	–	–
(Spain) David Ferrer	2005–18	14	3–11	21%	2–7	1–4	–	–
(Bulgaria) Grigor Dimitrov	2017–18	2	0–2	0%	–	0–2	–	–
(Croatia) Ivan Ljubičić	2006–08	3	0–3	0%	0–2	0–1	–	–
(Greece) Stefanos Tsitsipas	2018–21	3	0–3	0%	0–3	–	–	–
(Switzerland) Stan Wawrinka	2008–17	5	0–5	0%	0–3	0–2	–	–
Number 4 ranked players								
(France) Sebastien Grosjean	2007	1	1–0	100%	–	1–0	–	–
(Sweden) Robin Söderling	2005–11	6	5–1	83%	2–1	1–0	2–0	–
(United States) James Blake	2007–08	3	2–1	67%	0–1	–	2–0	–
(Germany) Nicolas Kiefer	2005–08	2	1–1	50%	–	1–1	–	–
(Czech Republic) Tomáš Berdych	2005–19	11	2–9	18%	2–7	0–2	–	–
(Italy) Jannik Sinner	2019–20	2	0–2	0%	0–1	0–1	–	–
(Japan) Kei Nishikori	2016–18	3	0–3	0%	0–2	0–1	–	–
Number 5 ranked players								
(United States) Taylor Fritz	2017	1	1–0	100%	1–0	–	–	–
(Germany) Rainer Schüttler	2004	1	1–0	100%	1–0	–	–	–
(Argentina) Gastón Gaudio	2004–05	2	1–1	50%	1–0	0–1	–	–
(Czech Republic) Jiří Novák	2005–06	2	1–1	50%	0–1	1–0	–	–
(Russia) Andrey Rublev	2017–21	2	1–1	50%	–	1–0	0–1	–
(Spain) Tommy Robredo	2007–14	8	3–5	38%	1–2	2–3	–	–
(France) Jo-Wilfried Tsonga	2007–17	12	1–11	8%	0–7	1–3	0–1	–
(South Africa) Kevin Anderson	2014–18	4	0–4	0%	0–1	0–2	0–1	–
Number 6 ranked players								
(France) Gilles Simon	2007–19	10	5–5	50%	2–5	3–0	–	–
(Spain) Albert Costa	2005	2	1–1	50%	–	1–1	–	–
(Ecuador) Nicolás Lapentti	2002–09	2	1–1	50%	1–0	0–1	–	–
(France) Gaël Monfils	2008–21	17	2–15	12%	0–11	1–3	1–1	–
(Italy) Matteo Berrettini	2019	1	0–1	0%	–	0–1	–	–
Number 7 ranked players								
(United States) Mardy Fish	2005–13	2	2–0	100%	2–0	–	–	–
(Croatia) Mario Ančić	2006	1	1–0	100%	–	1–0	–	–
(Spain) Fernando Verdasco	2006–21	11	7–4	64%	4–1	3–2	0–1	–
(France) Richard Gasquet	2005–19	5	3–2	60%	2–0	1–1	0–1	–
(Belgium) David Goffin	2013–15	3	1–2	33%	0–1	1–1	–	–
(Sweden) Thomas Johansson	2005	1	0–1	0%	–	–	–	0–1
Number 8 ranked players								
(Austria) Jürgen Melzer	2003–14	4	4–0	100%	2–0	2–0	–	–
(Russia) Mikhail Youzhny	2006–13	10	7–3	70%	3–1	3–0	0–1	1–1
(Russia) Karen Khachanov	2016–19	5	3–2	67%	1–1	2–1	–	–
(United States) John Isner	2010–17	8	4–4	50%	4–3	0–1	–	–
(Argentina) Diego Schwartzman	2017–21	2	1–1	50%	1–0	0–1	–	–
(United States) Jack Sock	2016–18	2	1–1	50%	0–1	1–0	–	–
(Cyprus) Marcos Baghdatis	2006–17	8	3–5	38%	0–2	2–1	1–2	–
(Serbia) Janko Tipsarević	2005–14	6	2–4	33%	1–2	1–2	–	–
(Czech Republic) Radek Štěpánek	2005–16	8	2–6	25%	1–3	0–2	1–1	–
Number 9 ranked players								
(Sweden) Joachim Johansson	2005	1	1–0	100%	–	–	1–0	–
(Chile) Nicolás Massú	2005	1	1–0	100%	1–0	–	–	–
(Italy) Fabio Fognini	2012–20	10	7–3	70%	3–1	4–2	–	–
(Spain) Roberto Bautista Agut	2014–22	6	3–3	50%	1–2	2–1	–	–
(Spain) Nicolás Almagro	2005–17	10	3–7	30%	2–2	1–5	–	–
Number 10 ranked players								
(Spain) Pablo Carreño Busta	2014–16	2	2–0	100%	1–0	1–0	–	–
(Latvia) Ernests Gulbis	2009–12	2	2–0	100%	–	2–0	–	–
(Australia) Alex de Minaur	2018	1	1–0	100%	1–0	–	–	–
(Argentina) Juan Mónaco	2004–12	4	2–2	50%	2–0	0–2	–	–
(France) Arnaud Clément	2007–10	2	1–1	50%	0–1	1–0	–	–
(France) Lucas Pouille	2017–19	4	1–3	25%	1–2	–	0–1	–
(Canada) Denis Shapovalov	2021	1	0–1	0%	–	–	0–1	–
(United States) Frances Tiafoe	2019	1	0–1	0%	–	0–1	–	–
Total	2002–22	359	135–224	38%	64–121 (35%)	57–76 (43%)	13–25 (34%)	1–2 (33%)

== German tournaments ==
Tournament	2002	2003	2004	2005	2006	2007	2008	2009	2010	2011	2012	2013	2014	2015	2016	2017	2018	2019	2020	2021	2022	SR	W–L	Win %
Munich	1R	A	2R	A	QF	W	A	2R	QF	QF	W	F	1R	F	W	2R	F	QF	NH	1R	1R	3 / 17	35–14	71%
Halle	A	A	A	QF	1R	SF	F	SF	QF	W	SF	QF	SF	1R	QF	2R	2R	1R	NH	QF	A	1 / 16	33–14	70%
Hamburg	1R	A	A	1R	1R	2R	1R	3R	3R	3R	QF	A	SF	1R	QF	SF	1R	1R	1R	2R	A	0 / 17	16–17	48%
Stuttgart	A	A	1R	2R	1R	2R	QF	2R	1R	A	A	F	2R	QF	F	QF	1R	1R	NH	A	A	0 / 14	16–13	55%
Düsseldorf	not held											2R	W	discontinued								1 / 2	4–1	80%
