= ATP Düsseldorf Open =

Düsseldorf Open
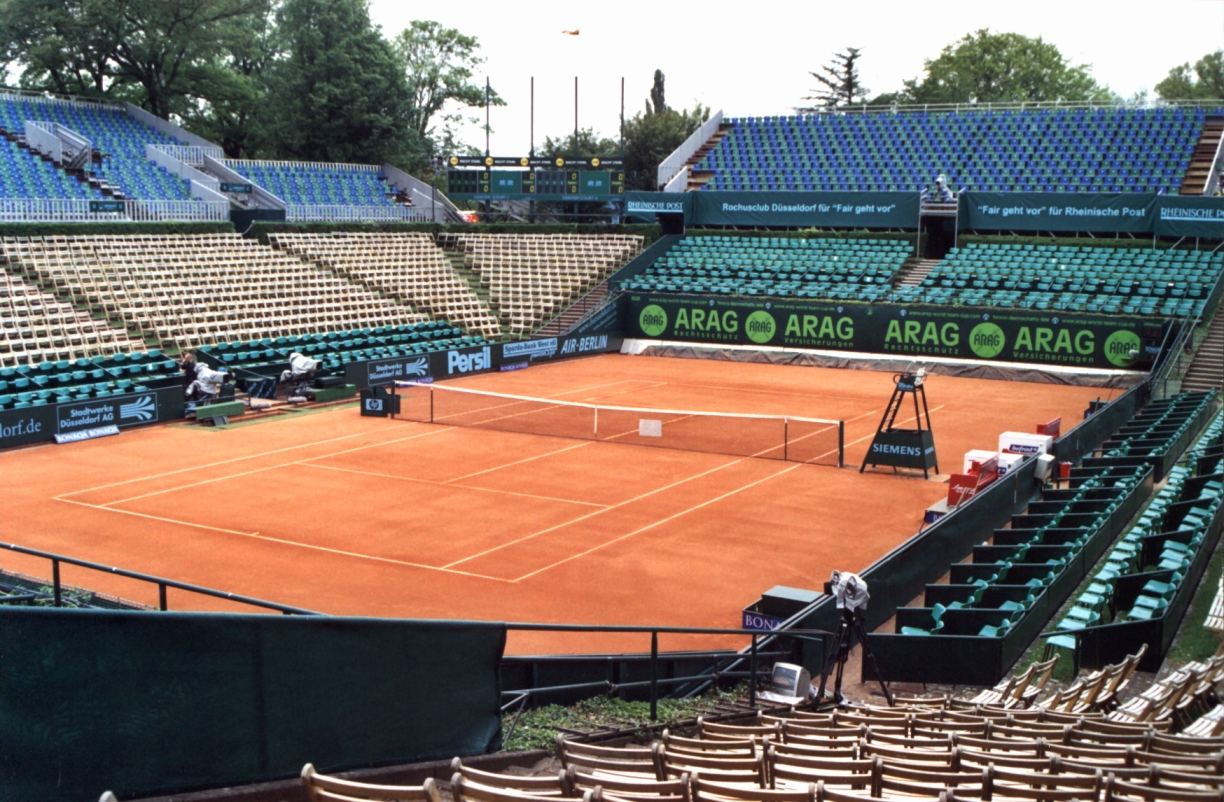

Defunct tennis tournament
- Founded: 2013
- Abolished: 2014
- Location: Düsseldorf; Germany
- Venue: Rochusclub
- Category: ATP World Tour 250 series
- Surface: Clay / Outdoors
- Draw: 28S / 32Q / 16D
- Prize money: €467,800

The Düsseldorf Open (formerly known as the Power Horse Cup) was a professional men's tennis tournament played on outdoor Clay in Düsseldorf, North Rhine-Westphalia, Germany. The event was affiliated with the ATP 250 series, on the ATP Tour. The initial event took place on 18–25 May 2013. The 2014 edition of the tournament took place without a title sponsor.

In 2015, the event was cancelled before the 2015 ATP World Tour, due a lack of sponsorship, and the tournament's spot in the schedule was awarded to the Geneva Open.

From 2006 until 2008, the Düsseldorf Open were an ATP Challenger Tour tournament played at the TG Nord tennis courts.

== Results ==
=== Singles ===
Year	Champions	Runners-up	Score
1978–2012	See ATP World Team Cup for previous ATP tour event in Düsseldorf		
2013	(Argentina) Juan Mónaco	(Finland) Jarkko Nieminen	6–4, 6–3
2014	(Germany) Philipp Kohlschreiber	(Croatia) Ivo Karlović	6–2, 7–6^{(7–4)}

=== Doubles ===
Year	Champions	Runners-up	Score
1978–2012	See ATP World Team Cup for previous ATP tour event in Düsseldorf		
2013	(Germany) Andre Begemann (Germany) Martin Emmrich	(Philippines) Treat Conrad Huey (United Kingdom) Dominic Inglot	7–5, 6–2
2014	(Mexico) Santiago González (United States) Scott Lipsky	(Germany) Martin Emmrich (Germany) Christopher Kas	7–5, 4–6, [10–3]

== See also ==
- Düsseldorf Grand Prix
- Düsseldorf Open (WTA Tour)
