= 2021 Nottingham Trophy – Women's singles =

Women's singles
- 2021 Nottingham Trophy

Final
- Champion: (Belgium) Alison Van Uytvanck
- Runner-up: (Australia) Arina Rodionova
- Score: 6–0, 6–4

Events
Singles	men	women
Doubles	men	women
← 2014 ·	Nottingham Trophy	· 2022 →

Kristýna Plíšková was the defending champion, winning the last edition of the tournament in 2014, however she chose not to participate.

Alison Van Uytvanck won the title, defeating Arina Rodionova in the final, 6–0, 6–4.

== Seeds ==
1. (Belgium) Alison Van Uytvanck (champion)
2. (Japan) Nao Hibino (first round)
3. (Kazakhstan) Zarina Diyas (first round, retired)
4. (United States) Christina McHale (first round)
5. (China) Zhu Lin (first round)
6. (Italy) Sara Errani (second round)
7. (Bulgaria) Viktoriya Tomova (first round)
8. (Hungary) Tímea Babos (second round)

== Draw ==
=== Key ===
- Q = Qualifier
- WC = Wild card
- LL = Lucky loser
- Alt = Alternate
- SE = Special exempt
- PR = Protected ranking
- ITF = ITF entry
- JE = Junior exempt
- w/o = Walkover
- r = Retired
- d = Defaulted
- SR = Special ranking

=== Finals ===
Semifinals
1	(Belgium) Alison Van Uytvanck	6	2	6
(Mexico) Renata Zarazúa	2	6	0
Q	(Australia) Arina Rodionova	6	0
(Bulgaria) Tsvetana Pironkova	4	0^{r}

Final
1	(Belgium) Alison Van Uytvanck	6	6
Q	(Australia) Arina Rodionova	0	4

=== Top half ===
First round
1	(Belgium) A Van Uytvanck	6	6
(Belgium) Y Bonaventure	3	2
WC	(United Kingdom) J Burrage	6	4	5
(Australia) L Cabrera	3	6	7
Q	(Japan) M Hibi	4	4
Q	(Spain) C Bucșa	6	6
(Belgium) G Minnen	3	6	6
5	(China) L Zhu	6	0	3
3	(Kazakhstan) Z Diyas	3	0^{r}
(Mexico) R Zarazúa	6	1
(United States) K Ahn	4	4
(Poland) K Kawa	6	6
(China) Xin Wang	7	6
WC	(United Kingdom) M Mutavdzic	5	1
(Serbia) O Danilović	4	4
6	(Italy) S Errani	6	6

Second round
1	(Belgium) A Van Uytvanck	6	4	6
(Australia) L Cabrera	1	6	1
Q	(Spain) C Bucșa	6	4	4
(Belgium) G Minnen	4	6	6
(Mexico) R Zarazúa	7^{10}	6
(Poland) K Kawa	6^{8}	2
(China) Xin Wang	6	6
6	(Italy) S Errani	3	4

Quarterfinals
1	(Belgium) A Van Uytvanck	6	6
(Belgium) G Minnen	4	4
(Mexico) R Zarazúa	6	3
(China) Xin Wang	1	0^{r}

Semifinals
1	(Belgium) A Van Uytvanck	6	2	6
(Mexico) R Zarazúa	2	6	0

=== Bottom half ===
First round
7	(Bulgaria) V Tomova	3	2
(France) O Dodin	6	6
WC	(United Kingdom) S Murray Sharan	7	3	3
Q	(Australia) Ar Rodionova	5	6	6
(Ukraine) A Kalinina	4	6	4
Q	(Ukraine) D Snigur	6	4	6
(China) Xiy Wang	6	7^{9}
4	(United States) C McHale	3	6^{7}
8	(Hungary) T Babos	6	6
(Australia) M Inglis	4	3
WC	(United Kingdom) E Raducanu	7^{7}	6
Q	(Australia) S Sanders	6^{3}	2
(Russia) K Rakhimova	6^{2}	2
Q	(Romania) M Niculescu	7^{7}	6
(Bulgaria) T Pironkova	6	6^{13}	6
2	(Japan) N Hibino	3	7^{15}	3

Second round
(France) O Dodin	6	3	6^{3}
Q	(Australia) Ar Rodionova	3	6	7^{7}
Q	(Ukraine) D Snigur	6^{5}	3
(China) Xiy Wang	7^{7}	6
8	(Hungary) T Babos	3	3
WC	(United Kingdom) E Raducanu	6	6
Q	(Romania) M Niculescu	6	3	3
(Bulgaria) T Pironkova	2	6	6

Quarterfinals
Q	(Australia) Ar Rodionova	7^{7}	4	7^{7}
(China) Xiy Wang	6^{5}	6	6^{4}
WC	(United Kingdom) E Raducanu	5	6^{2}
(Bulgaria) T Pironkova	7	7^{7}

Semifinals
Q	(Australia) Ar Rodionova	6	0
(Bulgaria) T Pironkova	4	0^{r}
