= 2013 Aegon Trophy =

- Date: 3–9 June
- Edition: 5th
- Draw: 32S / 16D
- Prize money: €64,000 (men) $75,000 (women)
- Surface: Grass
- Location: Nottingham, United Kingdom

Champions

Men's singles
- (Australia) Matthew Ebden

Women's singles
- (Croatia) Petra Martić

Men's doubles
- (United Kingdom) Jamie Murray / (Australia) John Peers

Women's doubles
- (United States) Maria Sanchez / (United Kingdom) Nicola Slater
| ← 2012 · | Aegon Trophy | · 2014 → |

The 2013 Aegon Trophy was a professional tennis tournament played on outdoor grass courts. It was the fifth edition of the tournament which was part of the 2013 ATP Challenger Tour and the 2013 ITF Women's Circuit. It took place in Nottingham, United Kingdom, on 3–9 June 2013.

== ATP entrants ==
=== Singles ===
==== Seeds ====
| Country | Player | Rank^{1} | Seed |
|---|---|---|---|
| AUS | Marinko Matosevic | 63 | 1 |
| ISR | Dudi Sela | 89 | 2 |
| CAN | Jesse Levine | 90 | 3 |
| FRA | Kenny de Schepper | 91 | 4 |
| USA | Ryan Harrison | 92 | 5 |
| USA | Rajeev Ram | 93 | 6 |
| GER | Benjamin Becker | 97 | 7 |
| CAN | Vasek Pospisil | 103 | 8 |

- ^{1} Rankings as of 27 May 2013.

==== Other entrants ====
The following players received wildcards into the singles main draw:

- (United Kingdom) Alex Bogdanovic
- (United Kingdom) Edward Corrie
- (United Kingdom) Dan Evans
- (United Kingdom) Josh Goodall

The following players received entry from the qualifying draw:

- (India) Prakash Amritraj
- (United Kingdom) Jamie Baker
- (Australia) Samuel Groth
- (United Kingdom) Brydan Klein

=== Doubles ===
==== Seeds ====
| Country | Player | Country | Player | Rank^{1} | Seed |
|---|---|---|---|---|---|
| MEX | Santiago González | USA | Scott Lipsky | 48 | 1 |
| USA | Eric Butorac | USA | Rajeev Ram | 88 | 2 |
| GBR | Jamie Murray | AUS | John Peers | 133 | 3 |
| THA | Sanchai Ratiwatana | THA | Sonchat Ratiwatana | 158 | 4 |

- ^{1} Rankings are as of May 27, 2013.

==== Other entrants ====
The following pairs received wildcards into the doubles main draw:

- (United Kingdom) Lewis Burton / (United Kingdom) Daniel Evans
- (United Kingdom) David Rice / (United Kingdom) Sean Thornley
- (United Kingdom) Ken Skupski / (United Kingdom) Neal Skupski

The following pair received entry from the qualification into the doubles main draw:

- (Germany) Benjamin Becker / (Germany) Michael Berrer

== WTA entrants ==
=== Seeds ===
| Country | Player | Rank^{1} | Seed |
|---|---|---|---|
| AUT | Tamira Paszek | 33 | 1 |
| SVK | Jana Čepelová | 69 | 2 |
| CZE | Karolína Plíšková | 73 | 3 |
| CAN | Eugenie Bouchard | 77 | 4 |
| JPN | Misaki Doi | 82 | 5 |
| SRB | Vesna Dolonc | 93 | 6 |
| USA | CoCo Vandeweghe | 96 | 7 |
| CZE | Kristýna Plíšková | 102 | 8 |

- ^{1} Rankings as of 27 May 2013

=== Other entrants ===
The following players received wildcards into the singles main draw:

- (United Kingdom) Elena Baltacha
- (United Kingdom) Anne Keothavong
- (United Kingdom) Johanna Konta
- (United Kingdom) Tara Moore

The following players received entry from the qualifying draw:

- (United States) Madison Brengle
- (Canada) Gabriela Dabrowski
- (Belgium) An-Sophie Mestach
- (United Kingdom) Melanie South

== Champions ==
=== Men's singles ===
- (Australia) Matthew Ebden def. (Germany) Benjamin Becker, 7–5, 4–6, 7–5

=== Women's singles ===
- (Croatia) Petra Martić def. (Czech Republic) Karolína Plíšková, 6–3, 6–3

=== Men's doubles ===
- (United Kingdom) Jamie Murray / (Australia) John Peers def. (United Kingdom) Ken Skupski / (United Kingdom) Neal Skupski, 6–2, 6–7^{(3–7)}, [10–6]

=== Women's doubles ===
- (United States) Maria Sanchez / (United Kingdom) Nicola Slater def. (Canada) Gabriela Dabrowski / (Canada) Sharon Fichman, 4–6, 6–3, [10–8]
