= 2021 Nottingham Trophy – Women's doubles =

Women's doubles
- 2021 Nottingham Trophy

Final
- Champions: (Romania) Monica Niculescu (Romania) Elena-Gabriela Ruse
- Runners-up: (Australia) Priscilla Hon (Australia) Storm Sanders
- Score: 7–5, 7–5

Events
Singles	men	women
Doubles	men	women
← 2014 ·	Nottingham Trophy	· 2022 →

Jocelyn Rae and Anna Smith were the defending champions, having won the previous edition in 2014, however Rae had since retired from professional tennis, whilst Smith chose not to participate.

Monica Niculescu and Elena-Gabriela Ruse won the title, defeating Priscilla Hon and Storm Sanders in the final, 7–5, 7–5.

== Seeds ==
1. (Hungary) Tímea Babos / (Australia) Arina Rodionova (semifinals)
2. (Netherlands) Lesley Pattinama Kerkhove / (United States) Sabrina Santamaria (quarterfinals)
3. (Belgium) Greet Minnen / (Belgium) Alison Van Uytvanck (first round)
4. (Romania) Monica Niculescu / (Romania) Elena-Gabriela Ruse (champions)

== Draw ==
=== Key ===
- Q = Qualifier
- WC = Wild card
- LL = Lucky loser
- Alt = Alternate
- SE = Special exempt
- PR = Protected ranking
- ITF = ITF entry
- JE = Junior exempt
- w/o = Walkover
- r = Retired
- d = Defaulted
- SR = Special ranking

=== Draw ===
First round
1	(Hungary) T Babos (Australia) Ar Rodionova	6	6
(Russia) V Savinykh (China) L Zhu	2	3
(Italy) S Errani (China) Xin Wang	7^{7}	4	[3]
(United States) J Loeb (United States) C McHale	6^{1}	6	[10]
4	(Romania) M Niculescu (Romania) E-G Ruse	6	6
(United States) K Ahn (Australia) L Cabrera	3	0
(Belarus) L Marozava (Russia) K Rakhimova	3	6^{4}
(Belgium) Y Bonaventure (Georgia (country)) E Gorgodze	6	7^{7}
WC	(United Kingdom) M Mutavdzic (Hungary) P Udvardy	4	2
WC	(United Kingdom) N Broady (United Kingdom) S Murray Sharan	6	6
(India) A Raina (Mexico) R Zarazúa	6	4	[10]
3	(Belgium) G Minnen (Belgium) A Van Uytvanck	3	6	[7]
WC	(Belgium) M Benoît (United Kingdom) K Bilchev	5	3
(Australia) P Hon (Australia) S Sanders	7	6
(Serbia) O Danilović (Bulgaria) V Tomova	7	5	[5]
2	(Netherlands) L Pattinama Kerkhove (United States) S Santamaria	5	7	[10]

Quarterfinals
1	(Hungary) T Babos (Australia) Ar Rodionova	6	6
(United States) J Loeb (United States) C McHale	0	2
4	(Romania) M Niculescu (Romania) E-G Ruse	6	6
(Belgium) Y Bonaventure (Georgia (country)) E Gorgodze	0	1
WC	(United Kingdom) N Broady (United Kingdom) S Murray Sharan	6^{4}	3
(India) A Raina (Mexico) R Zarazúa	7^{7}	6
(Australia) P Hon (Australia) S Sanders	6	6
2	(Netherlands) L Pattinama Kerkhove (United States) S Santamaria	4	4

Semifinals
1	(Hungary) T Babos (Australia) Ar Rodionova	6^{5}	6	[5]
4	(Romania) M Niculescu (Romania) E-G Ruse	7^{7}	4	[10]
(India) A Raina (Mexico) R Zarazúa	3	2
(Australia) P Hon (Australia) S Sanders	6	6

Final
4	(Romania) M Niculescu (Romania) E-G Ruse	7	7
(Australia) P Hon (Australia) S Sanders	5	5
