= 2021 Nottingham Trophy =

Tennis tournament

- Date: 14–20 June 2021
- Edition: 7th
- Category: ATP Challenger Tour; ITF Women's World Tennis Tour
- Prize money: €132,280 (men) $100,000+H (women)
- Surface: Grass
- Location: Nottingham, United Kingdom

Champions

Men's singles
- (Australia) Alex Bolt

Women's singles
- (Belgium) Alison Van Uytvanck

Men's doubles
- (Australia) Marc Polmans / (Australia) Matt Reid

Women's doubles
- (Romania) Monica Niculescu / (Romania) Elena-Gabriela Ruse
← 2014 ·	Nottingham Trophy	· 2022 →

The 2021 Nottingham Trophy was a professional tennis tournament played on outdoor grass courts. It was the seventh edition of the tournament which was part of the 2021 ATP Challenger Tour and the 2021 ITF Women's World Tennis Tour. It took place in Nottingham, United Kingdom between 14 and 20 June 2021.

== ATP singles main-draw entrants ==
=== Seeds ===
Country	Player	Rank^{1}	Seed
FRA	Richard Gasquet	53	1
KOR	Kwon Soon-woo	91	2
ITA	Andreas Seppi	98	3
RSA	Kevin Anderson	100	4
SWE	Mikael Ymer	105	5
KAZ	Mikhail Kukushkin	106	6
JPN	Yūichi Sugita	110	7
JPN	Yasutaka Uchiyama	115	8

- ^{1} Rankings are as of 31 May 2021.

=== Other entrants ===
The following players received wildcards into the main draw:

- (United Kingdom) Jay Clarke
- (United Kingdom) Anton Matusevich
- (United Kingdom) Aidan McHugh

The following player received entry into the singles main draw using a protected ranking:

- (Czech Republic) Tomáš Macháč

The following players received entry into the singles main draw as alternates:

- (Italy) Thomas Fabbiano
- (Argentina) Leonardo Mayer
- (Japan) Go Soeda

The following players received entry from the qualifying draw:

- (Australia) Alex Bolt
- (Romania) Marius Copil
- (United States) Ernesto Escobedo
- (India) Ramkumar Ramanathan

The following player received entry as a lucky loser:

- (China) Zhang Zhizhen

== Women's singles main-draw entrants ==
=== Seeds ===
Country	Player	Rank^{1}	Seed
BEL	Alison Van Uytvanck	67	1
JPN	Nao Hibino	82	2
KAZ	Zarina Diyas	93	3
USA	Christina McHale	95	4
CHN	Zhu Lin	99	5
ITA	Sara Errani	105	6
BUL	Viktoriya Tomova	108	7
HUN	Tímea Babos	111	8

- ^{1} Rankings are as of 31 May 2021.

=== Other entrants ===
The following players received wildcards into the singles main draw:

- (United Kingdom) Jodie Burrage
- (United Kingdom) Samantha Murray Sharan
- (United Kingdom) Matilda Mutavdzic
- (United Kingdom) Emma Raducanu

The following players received entry from the qualifying draw:

- (Spain) Cristina Bucșa
- (Japan) Mayo Hibi
- (Romania) Monica Niculescu
- (Australia) Arina Rodionova
- (Australia) Storm Sanders
- (Ukraine) Daria Snigur

== Champions ==
=== Men's singles ===
- (Australia) Alex Bolt def. (Poland) Kamil Majchrzak 4–6, 6–4, 6–3.

=== Women's singles ===
- (Belgium) Alison Van Uytvanck def. (Australia) Arina Rodionova 6–0, 6–4.

=== Men's doubles ===
- (Australia) Marc Polmans / (Australia) Matt Reid def. (France) Benjamin Bonzi / (France) Antoine Hoang 6–4, 4–6, [10–8].

=== Women's doubles ===
- (Romania) Monica Niculescu / (Romania) Elena-Gabriela Ruse def. (Australia) Priscilla Hon / (Australia) Storm Sanders 7–5, 7–5
