= 2021 Nottingham Trophy – Men's singles =

Men's singles
- 2021 Nottingham Trophy

Final
- Champion: (Australia) Alex Bolt
- Runner-up: (Poland) Kamil Majchrzak
- Score: 4–6, 6–4, 6–3

Events
Singles	men	women
Doubles	men	women
← 2014 ·	Nottingham Trophy	· 2022 →

Marcos Baghdatis was the defending champion but retired from professional tennis in 2019.

Alex Bolt won the title after defeating Kamil Majchrzak 4–6, 6–4, 6–3 in the final.

== Seeds ==
1. (France) Richard Gasquet (quarterfinals, retired)
2. (South Korea) Kwon Soon-woo (second round)
3. (Italy) Andreas Seppi (first round)
4. (South Africa) Kevin Anderson (first round)
5. (Sweden) Mikael Ymer (first round)
6. (Kazakhstan) Mikhail Kukushkin (first round)
7. (Japan) Yūichi Sugita (first round)
8. (Japan) Yasutaka Uchiyama (first round)

== Draw ==
=== Key ===
- Q = Qualifier
- WC = Wild card
- LL = Lucky loser
- Alt = Alternate
- ITF = ITF entry
- PR = Protected ranking
- SR = Special ranking
- SE = Special exempt
- JE = Junior exempt
- JR = Junior Accelerator Programme entrant
- CO = College Accelerator Programme entrant
- NG = Next Gen Accelerator Program entrant
- w/o = Walkover
- r = Retired
- d = Defaulted

=== Finals ===
Semifinals
Q	(Australia) Alex Bolt	6	6
(United States) Mackenzie McDonald	3	4
(Poland) Kamil Majchrzak	6	6
(France) Benjamin Bonzi	3	2

Final
Q	(Australia) Alex Bolt	4	6	6
(Poland) Kamil Majchrzak	6	4	3

=== Top half ===
First round
1	(France) R Gasquet	6	6
Alt	(Japan) G Soeda	4	2
(United States) M Cressy	5	7^{10}	6^{4}
WC	(United Kingdom) J Clarke	7	6^{8}	7^{7}
(Brazil) T Seyboth Wild	2	4
Q	(Australia) A Bolt	6	6
WC	(United Kingdom) A McHugh	7^{7}	6
6	(Kazakhstan) M Kukushkin	6^{4}	4
3	(Italy) A Seppi	6^{1}	4
LL	(China) Zh Zhang	7^{7}	6
(United States) M McDonald	6	6
(France) A Hoang	4	2
Alt	(Italy) T Fabbiano	4	7^{7}	6
(United States) B Nakashima	6	6^{0}	3
WC	(United Kingdom) A Matusevich	6	7
5	(Sweden) M Ymer	3	5

Second round
1	(France) R Gasquet	6	6
WC	(United Kingdom) J Clarke	2	3
Q	(Australia) A Bolt	6^{5}	6	6
WC	(United Kingdom) A McHugh	7^{7}	4	4
LL	(China) Zh Zhang	4	7^{7}	4
(United States) M McDonald	6	6^{3}	6
Alt	(Italy) T Fabbiano	6^{10}	4
WC	(United Kingdom) A Matusevich	7^{12}	6

Quarterfinals
1	(France) R Gasquet	3	7^{11}	0^{r}
Q	(Australia) A Bolt	6	6^{9}	1
(United States) M McDonald	6	6
WC	(United Kingdom) A Matusevich	2	3

Semifinals
Q	(Australia) A Bolt	6	6
(United States) M McDonald	3	4

=== Bottom half ===
First round
7	(Japan) Y Sugita	0	3
(Poland) K Majchrzak	6	6
Alt	(Argentina) L Mayer	6	3	6^{1}
Q	(India) R Ramanathan	3	6	7^{7}
(Italy) F Gaio	6	7^{9}
(Australia) M Polmans	4	6^{7}
(United States) D Kudla	7	1	6
4	(South Africa) K Anderson	5	6	3
8	(Japan) Y Uchiyama	6	5	6^{6}
Q	(United States) E Escobedo	4	7	7^{8}
Q	(Romania) M Copil	3	4
(France) B Bonzi	6	6
(Bosnia and Herzegovina) D Džumhur	7^{7}	6
(Russia) E Donskoy	6^{4}	2
PR	(Czech Republic) T Macháč	6	3	4
2	(South Korea) S-w Kwon	3	6	6

Second round
(Poland) K Majchrzak	6	6
Q	(India) R Ramanathan	4	3
(Italy) F Gaio	6	3	2
(United States) D Kudla	4	6	6
Q	(United States) E Escobedo	6^{10}	1
(France) B Bonzi	7^{12}	6
(Bosnia and Herzegovina) D Džumhur	6	6^{3}	6
2	(South Korea) S-w Kwon	4	7^{7}	2

Quarterfinals
(Poland) K Majchrzak	6^{6}	6	6
(United States) D Kudla	7^{8}	4	4
(France) B Bonzi	7^{7}	6
(Bosnia and Herzegovina) D Džumhur	6^{1}	2

Semifinals
(Poland) K Majchrzak	6	6
(France) B Bonzi	3	2
