= 2013 Aegon Trophy – Women's doubles =

Women's doubles
- 2013 Aegon Trophy

Final
- Champions: (United States) Maria Sanchez (United Kingdom) Nicola Slater
- Runners-up: (Canada) Gabriela Dabrowski (Canada) Sharon Fichman
- Score: 4–6, 6–3, [10–8]

Events
Singles	men	women
Doubles	men	women
← 2012 ·	Aegon Trophy	· 2014 →

Eleni Daniilidou and Casey Dellacqua are the defending champions, having won the event in 2012. Dellacqua chose not to defend her title; Daniilidou partnered up with Coco Vandeweghe, but they lost in the quarterfinals.

Maria Sanchez and Nicola Slater won the title, defeating Gabriela Dabrowski and Sharon Fichman in the final, 4–6, 6–3, [10–8].

== Seeds ==
1. (United States) Raquel Kops-Jones / (United States) Abigail Spears (first round)
2. (Croatia) Petra Martić / (Austria) Tamira Paszek (first round)
3. (Czech Republic) Karolína Plíšková / (Czech Republic) Kristýna Plíšková (first round)
4. (Japan) Miki Miyamura / (Thailand) Varatchaya Wongteanchai (first round)

== Draw ==
=== Key ===
- Q = Qualifier
- WC = Wild card
- LL = Lucky loser
- Alt = Alternate
- SE = Special exempt
- PR = Protected ranking
- ITF = ITF entry
- JE = Junior exempt
- w/o = Walkover
- r = Retired
- d = Defaulted
- SR = Special ranking

First round
1	(United States) R Kops-Jones (United States) A Spears	5	3
(Canada) E Bouchard (Thailand) L Kumkhum	7	6
(Hungary) M Czink (Serbia) V Dolonc	0	6	[8]
WC	(United Kingdom) N Broady (United Kingdom) A Smith	6	3	[10]
4	(Japan) M Miyamura (Thailand) V Wongteanchai	1	4
(United States) S Rogers (Australia) O Rogowska	6	6
(Canada) G Dabrowski (Canada) S Fichman	6	6
WC	(United Kingdom) A Keothavong (United Kingdom) J Konta	2	1
(Russia) A Rodionova (United Kingdom) E Webley-Smith	7^{8}	6
(United States) I Falconi (United States) A Riske	6^{6}	3
(United States) M Sanchez (United Kingdom) N Slater	3	6	[10]
3	(Czech Republic) Ka Plíšková (Czech Republic) Kr Plíšková	6	4	[8]
(Greece) E Daniilidou (United States) C Vandeweghe	7^{8}	5	[10]
WC	(United Kingdom) T Moore (United Kingdom) M South	6^{6}	7	[2]
(United Kingdom) S Murray (United Kingdom) J Windley	6	6^{2}	[10]
2	(Croatia) P Martić (Austria) T Paszek	1	7^{7}	[4]

Quarterfinals
(Canada) E Bouchard (Thailand) L Kumkhum	4	3
WC	(United Kingdom) N Broady (United Kingdom) A Smith	6	6
(United States) S Rogers (Australia) O Rogowska	6	4	[4]
(Canada) G Dabrowski (Canada) S Fichman	4	6	[10]
(Russia) A Rodionova (United Kingdom) E Webley-Smith	3	5
(United States) M Sanchez (United Kingdom) N Slater	6	7
(Greece) E Daniilidou (United States) C Vandeweghe	5	6	[10]
(United Kingdom) S Murray (United Kingdom) J Windley	7	3	[12]

Semifinals
WC	(United Kingdom) N Broady (United Kingdom) A Smith	3	3
(Canada) G Dabrowski (Canada) S Fichman	6	6
(United States) M Sanchez (United Kingdom) N Slater	6	6
(United Kingdom) S Murray (United Kingdom) J Windley	0	4

Final
(Canada) G Dabrowski (Canada) S Fichman	6	3	[8]
(United States) M Sanchez (United Kingdom) N Slater	4	6	[10]
