= 2013 Aegon Trophy – Women's singles =

Women's singles
- 2013 Aegon Trophy

Final
- Champion: (Croatia) Petra Martić
- Runner-up: (Czech Republic) Karolína Plíšková
- Score: 6–3, 6–3

Events
Singles	men	women
Doubles	men	women
← 2012 ·	Aegon Trophy	· 2014 →

Urszula Radwańska is the defending champion, having won the event in 2012, but chose not to defend her title.

Petra Martić won the title, defeating Karolína Plíšková in the final, 6–3, 6–3.

== Seeds ==
1. (Austria) Tamira Paszek (second round; retired)
2. (Slovakia) Jana Čepelová (first round)
3. (Czech Republic) Karolína Plíšková (final)
4. (Canada) Eugenie Bouchard (second round)
5. (Japan) Misaki Doi (second round)
6. (Serbia) Vesna Dolonc (second round)
7. (United States) Coco Vandeweghe (second round)
8. (Czech Republic) Kristýna Plíšková (first round)

== Main draw ==
=== Key ===
- Q = Qualifier
- WC = Wild card
- LL = Lucky loser
- Alt = Alternate
- SE = Special exempt
- PR = Protected ranking
- ITF = ITF entry
- JE = Junior exempt
- w/o = Walkover
- r = Retired
- d = Defaulted
- SR = Special ranking

=== Finals ===
Semifinals
WC	(United Kingdom) Johanna Konta	6	5	3
3	(Czech Republic) Karolína Plíšková	3	7	6
(Canada) Sharon Fichman	4	2
(Croatia) Petra Martić	6	6

Final
3	(Czech Republic) Karolína Plíšková	3	3
(Croatia) Petra Martić	6	6

=== Top half ===
First round
1	(Austria) T Paszek	7^{8}	6
WC	(United Kingdom) A Keothavong	6^{6}	3
(Belgium) A Van Uytvanck	4	4
(United States) A Riske	6	6
WC	(United Kingdom) J Konta	6	6
Q	(Belgium) A-S Mestach	2	4
(United States) M Sanchez	2	3
5	(Japan) M Doi	6	6
3	(Czech Republic) Ka Plíšková	7	7
(Portugal) M Larcher de Brito	5	5
(Australia) O Rogowska	6	6
(South Africa) C Simmonds	4	4
(Thailand) L Kumkhum	7	2	2
(Greece) E Daniilidou	5	6	6
WC	(United Kingdom) E Baltacha	2	4
6	(Serbia) V Dolonc	6	6

Second round
1	(Austria) T Paszek	6	5	0^{r}
(United States) A Riske	4	7	2
WC	(United Kingdom) J Konta	6^{3}	6	7^{7}
5	(Japan) M Doi	7^{7}	2	6^{4}
3	(Czech Republic) Ka Plíšková	2	6	7
(Australia) O Rogowska	6	4	5
(Greece) E Daniilidou	6	6
6	(Serbia) V Dolonc	3	3

Quarterfinals
(United States) A Riske	2	7	5
WC	(United Kingdom) J Konta	6	5	7
3	(Czech Republic) Ka Plíšková	6	3	6
(Greece) E Daniilidou	3	6	3

Semifinals
WC	(United Kingdom) J Konta	6	5	3
3	(Czech Republic) Ka Plíšková	3	7	6

=== Bottom half ===
First round
7	(United States) C Vandeweghe	7	6
(Canada) S Dubois	5	4
(Canada) S Fichman	6	6
(Thailand) T Tanasugarn	2	1
Q	(United Kingdom) M South	3	2
(United States) I Falconi	6	6
Q	(United States) M Brengle	4	6	5
4	(Canada) E Bouchard	6	2	7
8	(Czech Republic) Kr Plíšková	6	1	6^{5}
(Hungary) M Czink	3	6	7^{7}
WC	(United Kingdom) T Moore	5	6	6
(Slovenia) T Majerič	7	4	2
(Croatia) P Martić	7^{7}	6
(Portugal) MJ Koehler	6^{5}	1
Q	(Canada) G Dabrowski	2	6	7^{7}
2	(Slovakia) J Čepelová	6	4	6^{5}

Second round
7	(United States) C Vandeweghe	3	6^{4}
(Canada) S Fichman	6	7^{7}
(United States) I Falconi	4	6	6
4	(Canada) E Bouchard	6	2	1
(Hungary) M Czink	6	7
WC	(United Kingdom) T Moore	1	5
(Croatia) P Martić	1	6	7^{7}
Q	(Canada) G Dabrowski	6	1	6^{3}

Quarterfinals
(Canada) S Fichman	4	6	6
(United States) I Falconi	6	3	2
(Hungary) M Czink	4	4
(Croatia) P Martić	6	6

Semifinals
(Canada) S Fichman	4	2
(Croatia) P Martić	6	6
