= 2021 Nottingham Trophy – Men's doubles =

Men's doubles
- 2021 Nottingham Trophy

Final
- Champions: (Australia) Marc Polmans (Australia) Matt Reid
- Runners-up: (France) Benjamin Bonzi (France) Antoine Hoang
- Score: 6–4, 4–6, [10–8]

Events
Singles	men	women
Doubles	men	women
← 2014 ·	Nottingham Trophy	· 2022 →

Chris Guccione and Rajeev Ram were the defending champions but chose not to defend their title.

Marc Polmans and Matt Reid won the title after defeating Benjamin Bonzi and Antoine Hoang 6–4, 4–6, [10–8] in the final.

== Seeds ==
1. (Australia) Matthew Ebden / (Belarus) Andrei Vasilevski (semifinals)
2. (United States) Nathaniel Lammons / (United States) Jackson Withrow (quarterfinals)
3. (Australia) Marc Polmans / (Australia) Matt Reid (champions)
4. (France) Benjamin Bonzi / (France) Antoine Hoang (final)

== Draw ==
=== Key ===
- Q = Qualifier
- WC = Wild card
- LL = Lucky loser
- Alt = Alternate
- SE = Special exempt
- PR = Protected ranking
- ITF = ITF entry
- JE = Junior exempt
- w/o = Walkover
- r = Retired
- d = Defaulted
- SR = Special ranking

First round
WC	(Croatia) B Gojo (United Kingdom) A Matusevich	7^{9}	7
(United Kingdom) L Johnson (United Kingdom) A McHugh	6^{7}	5
4	(France) B Bonzi (France) A Hoang	7^{7}	6
(Argentina) L Mayer (Brazil) T Seyboth Wild	6^{2}	2
(United States) M Cressy (India) R Ramanathan	3	6^{4}
(Russia) E Donskoy (Poland) K Majchrzak	6	7^{7}
(Italy) T Fabbiano (Japan) Y Uchiyama	3	4
WC	(United Kingdom) A Fery (United Kingdom) F Gill	6	6
(Czech Republic) T Macháč (Spain) M Vilella Martínez
3	(Australia) M Polmans (Australia) M Reid	w/o
(United Kingdom) J Clarke (Australia) T Kokkinakis
(Japan) G Soeda (China) Zh Zhang	w/o
WC	(United Kingdom) Tad Maclean (United Kingdom) Finn Murgett	3	3
2	(United States) N Lammons (United States) J Withrow	6	6

Quarterfinals
1	(Australia) M Ebden (Belarus) A Vasilevski	6	7^{7}
WC	(Croatia) B Gojo (United Kingdom) A Matusevich	3	6^{3}
4	(France) B Bonzi (France) A Hoang	6	6
(Russia) E Donskoy (Poland) K Majchrzak	1	2
WC	(United Kingdom) A Fery (United Kingdom) F Gill	3	4
3	(Australia) M Polmans (Australia) M Reid	6	6
(Japan) G Soeda (China) Zh Zhang	7	2	[13]
2	(United States) N Lammons (United States) J Withrow	5	6	[11]

Semifinals
1	(Australia) M Ebden (Belarus) A Vasilevski	2	6	[11]
4	(France) B Bonzi (France) A Hoang	6	3	[13]
3	(Australia) M Polmans (Australia) M Reid	6	6
(Japan) G Soeda (China) Zh Zhang	4	4

Final
4	(France) B Bonzi (France) A Hoang	4	6	[8]
3	(Australia) M Polmans (Australia) M Reid	6	4	[10]
