= 2013 Aegon Trophy – Men's doubles =

Men's doubles
- 2013 Aegon Trophy

Final
- Champions: (United Kingdom) Jamie Murray (Australia) John Peers
- Runners-up: (United Kingdom) Ken Skupski (United Kingdom) Neal Skupski
- Score: 6–2, 6–7^{(3–7)}, [10–6]

Events
Singles	men	women
Doubles	men	women
← 2012 ·	Aegon Trophy	· 2014 →

Treat Huey and Dominic Inglot were the defending champions but they decided not to participate.
Jamie Murray and John Peers defeated Ken and Neal Skupski 6–2, 6–7^{(3–7)}, [10–6] in the final to win the title.

== Seeds ==
1. (Mexico) Santiago González / (United States) Scott Lipsky (quarterfinals)
2. (United States) Eric Butorac / (United States) Rajeev Ram (semifinals)
3. (United Kingdom) Jamie Murray / (Australia) John Peers (champions)
4. (Thailand) Sanchai Ratiwatana / (Thailand) Sonchat Ratiwatana (semifinals)

== Draw ==
=== Key ===
- Q = Qualifier
- WC = Wild card
- LL = Lucky loser
- Alt = Alternate
- SE = Special exempt
- PR = Protected ranking
- ITF = ITF entry
- JE = Junior exempt
- w/o = Walkover
- r = Retired
- d = Defaulted
- SR = Special ranking

=== Draw ===
First round
1	(Mexico) S González (United States) S Lipsky	7	4	[11]
Q	(Germany) B Becker (Germany) M Berrer	5	6	[9]
WC	(United Kingdom) K Skupski (United Kingdom) N Skupski	6	7
WC	(United Kingdom) D Rice (United Kingdom) S Thornley	1	5
4	(Thailand) Sa Ratiwatana (Thailand) So Ratiwatana	6	6
(Australia) M Matosevic (Australia) M Reid	4	4
(United States) R Harrison (United States) T Smyczek	4	6	[10]
(Australia) S Groth (Australia) J-P Smith	6	3	[2]
(Australia) C Guccione (Canada) A Shamasdin	6^{5}	4
(United Kingdom) J Delgado (Australia) M Ebden	7^{7}	6
WC	(United Kingdom) L Burton (United Kingdom) D Evans	3	3
3	(United Kingdom) J Murray (Australia) J Peers	6	6
(United States) S Johnson (Canada) V Pospisil	6	6
(Australia) P Hanley (Australia) J Kerr	3	4
(Germany) M Bachinger (Germany) D Brown	6	6^{5}	[9]
2	(United States) E Butorac (United States) R Ram	4	7^{7}	[11]

Quarterfinals
1	(Mexico) S González (United States) S Lipsky	4	2
WC	(United Kingdom) K Skupski (United Kingdom) N Skupski	6	6
4	(Thailand) Sa Ratiwatana (Thailand) So Ratiwatana	7^{7}	7^{7}
(United States) R Harrison (United States) T Smyczek	6^{3}	6^{5}
(United Kingdom) J Delgado (Australia) M Ebden	6^{3}	0
3	(United Kingdom) J Murray (Australia) J Peers	7^{7}	6
(United States) S Johnson (Canada) V Pospisil	4	4
2	(United States) E Butorac (United States) R Ram	6	6

Semifinals
WC	(United Kingdom) K Skupski (United Kingdom) N Skupski	6	6
4	(Thailand) Sa Ratiwatana (Thailand) So Ratiwatana	3	4
3	(United Kingdom) J Murray (Australia) J Peers	6	4	[10]
2	(United States) E Butorac (United States) R Ram	4	6	[7]

Final
WC	(United Kingdom) K Skupski (United Kingdom) N Skupski	2	7^{7}	[6]
3	(United Kingdom) J Murray (Australia) J Peers	6	6^{3}	[10]
