= 2012 Aegon Trophy =

- Date: 4–10 June
- Edition: 4th
- Surface: Grass
- Location: Nottingham, Great Britain

Champions

Men's singles
- (Germany) Benjamin Becker

Women's singles
- (Poland) Urszula Radwańska

Men's doubles
- (Philippines) Treat Conrad Huey / (United Kingdom) Dominic Inglot

Women's doubles
- (Greece) Eleni Daniilidou / (Australia) Casey Dellacqua
← 2011 ·	Aegon Trophy	· 2013 →

The 2012 Aegon Trophy was a professional tennis tournament played on grass courts. It was the fourth edition of the tournament which was part of the 2012 ATP Challenger Tour and the 2012 ITF Women's Circuit. It took place in Nottingham, Great Britain between 4 and 10 June 2012.

== ATP entrants ==
=== Seeds ===
Country	Player	Rank^{1}	Seed
JPN	Go Soeda	58	1
SVK	Lukáš Lacko	64	2
JPN	Tatsuma Ito	68	3
RUS	Dmitry Tursunov	88	4
AUS	Marinko Matosevic	90	5
RUS	Igor Kunitsyn	101	6
CAN	Vasek Pospisil	102	7
EST	Jürgen Zopp	103	8

- ^{1} Rankings are as of May 28, 2012.

=== Other entrants ===
The following players received wildcards into the singles main draw:

- (United Kingdom) Jamie Baker
- (United Kingdom) Andrew Fitzpatrick
- (United Kingdom) Oliver Golding
- (United Kingdom) Josh Goodall

The following players received entry from the qualifying draw:

- (United States) Robert Kendrick
- (Ukraine) Illya Marchenko
- (Russia) Denis Matsukevich
- (Denmark) Frederik Nielsen

== WTA entrants ==
=== Seeds ===
Country	Player	Rank^{1}	Seed
AUT	Tamira Paszek	52	1
TPE	Hsieh Su-wei	64	2
GBR	Elena Baltacha	68	3
GRE	Eleni Daniilidou	69	4
GEO	Anna Tatishvili	75	5
JPN	Kimiko Date-Krumm	76	6
POL	Urszula Radwańska	79	7
GBR	Anne Keothavong	81	8

- ^{1} Rankings are as of May 28, 2012.

=== Other entrants ===
The following players received wildcards into the singles main draw:

- (United Kingdom) Naomi Broady
- (United Kingdom) Tara Moore
- (United Kingdom) Samantha Murray
- (United Kingdom) Melanie South

The following players received entry from the qualifying draw:

- (Portugal) Michelle Larcher de Brito
- (United States) Melanie Oudin
- (Czech Republic) Kristýna Plíšková
- (United States) CoCo Vandeweghe

== Champions ==
=== Men's singles ===
- (Germany) Benjamin Becker def. (Russia) Dmitry Tursunov, 4–6, 6–1, 6–4

=== Men's doubles ===
- (Philippines) Treat Conrad Huey / (United Kingdom) Dominic Inglot def. (United Kingdom) Jonathan Marray / (Denmark) Frederik Nielsen, 6–4, 6–7^{(9–11)}, [10–8]

=== Women's singles ===
- (Poland) Urszula Radwańska def. (United States) CoCo Vandeweghe, 6–1, 4–6, 6–1

=== Women's doubles ===
- (Greece) Eleni Daniilidou / (Australia) Casey Dellacqua def. (United Kingdom) Laura Robson / (United Kingdom) Heather Watson, 6–4, 6–2
