= 2014 Aegon Trophy – Women's doubles =

Women's doubles
- 2014 Aegon Trophy

Final
- Champions: (United Kingdom) Jocelyn Rae (United Kingdom) Anna Smith
- Runners-up: (Canada) Sharon Fichman (United States) Maria Sanchez
- Score: 7–6^{(7–5)}, 4–6, [10–5]

Events
| Singles | men | women |
| Doubles | men | women |
| ← 2013 · | Aegon Trophy | · 2015 → |

Maria Sanchez and Nicola Slater were the defending champions, having won the event in 2013, but both players chose to participate with different partners this year. Sanchez partnered Sharon Fichman as the fourth seeds, losing in the final whilst Slater partnered with Emily Webley-Smith, having been given a wildcard berth, losing in the quarterfinals.

Jocelyn Rae and Anna Smith won the title, defeating Fichman and Sanchez in the final, 7–6^{(7–5)}, 4–6, [10–5].

== Seeds ==
1. (Czech Republic) Andrea Hlaváčková / (China) Zheng Jie (semifinals)
2. (Canada) Gabriela Dabrowski / (Poland) Alicja Rosolska (semifinals)
3. (Australia) Anastasia Rodionova / (Australia) Arina Rodionova (first round)
4. (Canada) Sharon Fichman / (United States) Maria Sanchez (final)

== Draw ==
=== Key ===
- Q = Qualifier
- WC = Wild card
- LL = Lucky loser
- Alt = Alternate
- SE = Special exempt
- PR = Protected ranking
- ITF = ITF entry
- JE = Junior exempt
- w/o = Walkover
- r = Retired
- d = Defaulted
- SR = Special ranking

First round
1 | (Czech Republic) A Hlaváčková (China) J Zheng | 6 | 6
(Ukraine) L Kichenok (Ukraine) N Kichenok | 4 | 4
Alt | (United States) J Boserup (United States) M Brengle | 2 | 6 | [12]
WC | (United Kingdom) S Murray (United Kingdom) J Windley | 6 | 1 | [10]
4 | (Canada) S Fichman (United States) M Sanchez | 7^{7} | 5 | [13]
(Australia) O Rogowska (United States) C Vandeweghe | 6^{4} | 7 | [11]
(Poland) M Linette (China) S Zheng | 6 | 3 | [10]
WC | (United Kingdom) J Konta (United Kingdom) T Moore | 4 | 6 | [7]
(Serbia) V Dolonc (United States) V Lepchenko | 7^{7} | 3 | [9]
(United Kingdom) N Broady (Greece) E Daniilidou | 6^{4} | 6 | [11]
(United Kingdom) J Rae (United Kingdom) A Smith | 6 | 6
3 | (Australia) An Rodionova (Australia) Ar Rodionova | 4 | 3
WC | (United Kingdom) N Slater (United Kingdom) E Webley-Smith | 6 | 1 | [10]
(France) S Foretz Gacon (Czech Republic) E Hrdinová | 4 | 6 | [8]
(Japan) S Aoyama (United States) I Falconi | 3 | 1
2 | (Canada) G Dabrowski (Poland) A Rosolska | 6 | 6

Quarterfinals
1 | (Czech Republic) A Hlaváčková (China) J Zheng | 6 | 6
Alt | (United States) J Boserup (United States) M Brengle | 2 | 2
4 | (Canada) S Fichman (United States) M Sanchez | 6 | 6
(Poland) M Linette (China) S Zheng | 4 | 4
(United Kingdom) N Broady (Greece) E Daniilidou | 2 | 5
(United Kingdom) J Rae (United Kingdom) A Smith | 6 | 7
WC | (United Kingdom) N Slater (United Kingdom) E Webley-Smith | 4 | 4
2 | (Canada) G Dabrowski (Poland) A Rosolska | 6 | 6

Semifinals
1 | (Czech Republic) A Hlaváčková (China) J Zheng | 7^{7} | 5 | [8]
4 | (Canada) S Fichman (United States) M Sanchez | 6^{4} | 7 | [10]
(United Kingdom) J Rae (United Kingdom) A Smith | 7^{7} | 6
2 | (Canada) G Dabrowski (Poland) A Rosolska | 6^{5} | 3

Final
4 | (Canada) S Fichman (United States) M Sanchez | 6^{5} | 6 | [5]
(United Kingdom) J Rae (United Kingdom) A Smith | 7^{7} | 4 | [10]
