= 2014 Aegon Trophy =

- Date: 2–8 June
- Edition: 6th
- Draw: 32S/16D
- Prize money: €64,000 (men) $75,000 (women)
- Surface: Grass
- Location: Nottingham, United Kingdom

Champions

Men's singles
- (Cyprus) Marcos Baghdatis

Women's singles
- (Czech Republic) Kristýna Plíšková

Men's doubles
- (Australia) Chris Guccione / (United States) Rajeev Ram

Women's doubles
- (United Kingdom) Jocelyn Rae / (United Kingdom) Anna Smith
← 2013 ·	Aegon Trophy	· 2015 →

The 2014 Aegon Trophy was a professional tennis tournament played on outdoor grass courts. It was the sixth edition of the tournament which was part of the 2014 ATP Challenger Tour and the 2014 ITF Women's Circuit. It took place in Nottingham, United Kingdom, on 2–8 June 2014.

== ATP entrants ==
=== Singles ===
==== Seeds ====
Country	Player	Rank^{1}	Seed
NED	Igor Sijsling	55	1
USA	Steve Johnson	64	2
AUS	Marinko Matosevic	66	3
GER	Benjamin Becker	69	4
FRA	Kenny de Schepper	72	5
AUS	Matthew Ebden	73	6
JPN	Go Soeda	103	7
ISR	Dudi Sela	110	8

- ^{1} Rankings as of 26 May 2014

==== Other entrants ====
The following players received wildcards into the singles main draw:

- (United Kingdom) Daniel Cox
- (United Kingdom) Kyle Edmund
- (United Kingdom) Daniel Smethurst
- (United Kingdom) David Rice

The following players received entry from the qualifying draw:

- (United Kingdom) Marcus Willis
- (Australia) Ben Mitchell
- (Australia) John-Patrick Smith
- (New Zealand) Michael Venus

=== Doubles ===
==== Seeds ====
Country	Player	Country	Player	Rank^{1}	Seed
GBR	Colin Fleming	BRA	Andre Sá	111	1
GBR	Ken Skupski	GBR	Neal Skupski	133	2
USA	Nicholas Monroe	IND	Divij Sharan	134	3
AUS	Chris Guccione	USA	Rajeev Ram	164	4

- ^{1} Rankings as of 26 May 2014

==== Other entrants ====
The following pairs received wildcards into the doubles main draw:

- (United Kingdom) Lewis Burton / (United Kingdom) Marcus Willis
- (United Kingdom) David Rice / (United Kingdom) Sean Thornley
- (United Kingdom) Edward Corrie / (United Kingdom) Daniel Smethurst

The following pair received entry from the qualifying draw:

- (United States) Austin Krajicek / (United States) Rhyne Williams

== WTA entrants ==
=== Singles main-draw entrants ===
==== Seeds ====
Country	Player	Rank^{1}	Seed
PUR	~~Monica Puig~~	41	1
USA	~~Christina McHale~~	52	2
CAN	Sharon Fichman	77	3
POL	~~Urszula Radwańska~~	79	4
KAZ	Zarina Diyas	86	5
USA	CoCo Vandeweghe	91	6
CRO	Mirjana Lučić-Baroni	100	7
GBR	Johanna Konta	102	8

- ^{1} Rankings as of 26 May 2014

==== Other entrants ====
The following players received wildcards into the singles main draw:

- (United Kingdom) Naomi Broady
- (United Kingdom) Katy Dunne
- (United Kingdom) Tara Moore
- (United Kingdom) Emily Webley-Smith

The following players received entry from the qualifying draw:

- (Greece) Eleni Daniilidou
- (Estonia) Anett Kontaveit
- (Thailand) Noppawan Lertcheewakarn
- (Russia) Marta Sirotkina

The following players received entry into the singles main draw as lucky losers:

- (United States) Julia Boserup
- (Japan) Risa Ozaki
- (Australia) Anastasia Rodionova
- (Australia) Arina Rodionova

=== Doubles ===
==== Seeds ====
Country	Player	Country	Player	Rank^{1}	Seed
CZE	Andrea Hlaváčková	CHN	Zheng Jie	31	1
CAN	Gabriela Dabrowski	POL	Alicja Rosolska	132	2
AUS	Anastasia Rodionova	AUS	Arina Rodionova	148	3
CAN	Sharon Fichman	USA	Maria Sanchez	158	4

- ^{1} Rankings as of 26 May 2014

==== Other entrants ====
The following pairs received wildcards into the doubles main draw:

- (United Kingdom) Samantha Murray / (United Kingdom) Jade Windley
- (United Kingdom) Johanna Konta / (United Kingdom) Tara Moore
- (United Kingdom) Nicola Slater / (United Kingdom) Emily Webley-Smith

== Champions ==
=== Men's singles ===
- (Cyprus) Marcos Baghdatis def. (Australia) Marinko Matosevic, 6–4, 6–3

=== Women's singles ===
- (Czech Republic) Kristýna Plíšková def. (Kazakhstan) Zarina Diyas, 6–2, 3–6, 6–4

=== Men's doubles ===
- (Australia) Chris Guccione / (United States) Rajeev Ram def. (United Kingdom) Colin Fleming / (Brazil) Andre Sá, 6–7^{(2–7)}, 6–2, [11–9]

=== Women's doubles ===
- (United Kingdom) Jocelyn Rae / (United Kingdom) Anna Smith def. (Canada) Sharon Fichman / (United States) Maria Sanchez, 7–6^{(7–5)}, 4–6, [10–5]
