= 2012 Aegon Trophy – Women's singles =

Women's singles
- 2012 Aegon Trophy

Final
- Champion: (Poland) Urszula Radwańska
- Runner-up: (United States) Coco Vandeweghe
- Score: 6–1, 4–6, 6–1

Events
Singles	men	women
Doubles	men	women
← 2011 ·	Aegon Trophy	· 2013 →

Eleni Daniilidou was the defending champion but was knocked out in the first round by Kristýna Plíšková.
Urszula Radwańska went on to win the title by defeating Coco Vandeweghe 6–1, 4–6, 6–1 in the final.

== Seeds ==
1. (Austria) Tamira Paszek (first round)
2. (Chinese Taipei) Hsieh Su-wei (quarterfinals)
3. (United Kingdom) Elena Baltacha (quarterfinals)
4. (Greece) Eleni Daniilidou (first round)
5. (Georgia (country)) Anna Tatishvili (second round)
6. (Japan) Kimiko Date-Krumm (first round, retired)
7. (Poland) Urszula Radwańska (champion)
8. (United Kingdom) Anne Keothavong (semifinals)

== Draw ==
=== Key ===
- Q = Qualifier
- WC = Wild card
- LL = Lucky loser
- Alt = Alternate
- SE = Special exempt
- PR = Protected ranking
- ITF = ITF entry
- JE = Junior exempt
- w/o = Walkover
- r = Retired
- d = Defaulted
- SR = Special ranking

=== Finals ===
Semifinals
(United States) Irina Falconi	4	6	5
7	(Poland) Urszula Radwańska	6	2	7
8	(United Kingdom) Anne Keothavong	3	2
Q	(United States) Coco Vandeweghe	6	6

Final
7	(Poland) Urszula Radwańska	6	4	6
Q	(United States) Coco Vandeweghe	1	6	1

=== Top half ===
First round
1	(Austria) T Paszek	5	4
(United States) A Riske	7	6
(Russia) V Savinykh	3	4
(Chinese Taipei) K-c Chang	6	6
(Japan) E Sema	6	2	6
(Canada) S Dubois	1	6	4
(United States) I Falconi	3	6	2
6	(Japan) K Date-Krumm	6	3	0^{r}
3	(United Kingdom) E Baltacha	6	6
(Australia) C Dellacqua	2	4
Q	(Portugal) M Larcher de Brito	4	6	7^{7}
(Japan) A Morita	6	0	6^{4}
(Czech Republic) E Birnerová	3	5
(Spain) G Muguruza Blanco	6	7
(Japan) M Doi	6	5	4
7	(Poland) U Radwańska	4	7	6

Second round
(United States) A Riske	3	1
(Chinese Taipei) K-c Chang	6	6
(Japan) E Sema	6^{3}	4
(United States) I Falconi	7	6
3	(United Kingdom) E Baltacha	6	6
Q	(Portugal) M Larcher de Brito	4	2
(Spain) G Muguruza Blanco	0	3
7	(Poland) U Radwańska	6	6

Quarterfinals
(Chinese Taipei) K-c Chang	7	4	2
(United States) I Falconi	5	6	6
3	(United Kingdom) E Baltacha	3	5
7	(Poland) U Radwańska	6	7

Semifinals
(United States) I Falconi	4	6	5
7	(Poland) U Radwańska	6	2	7

=== Bottom half ===
First round
8	(United Kingdom) A Keothavong	6	6
(Czech Republic) Ka Plíšková	4	2
(United Kingdom) L Robson	7	6
(Italy) A Brianti	5	4
WC	(United Kingdom) T Moore	7^{7}	2	7^{8}
WC	(United Kingdom) M South	6^{5}	6	6^{6}
Q	(Czech Republic) Kr Plíšková	7^{11}	6
4	(Greece) E Daniilidou	6^{9}	4
5	(Georgia (country)) A Tatishvili	6	3	7^{7}
(Hungary) M Czink	2	6	6^{2}
WC	(United Kingdom) S Murray	2	5
Q	(United States) C Vandeweghe	6	7
Q	(United States) M Oudin	6	1	6^{5}
(United Kingdom) H Watson	4	6	7^{7}
WC	(United Kingdom) N Broady	6	2	1
2	(Chinese Taipei) S-w Hsieh	4	6	6

Second round
8	(United Kingdom) A Keothavong	6	6
(United Kingdom) L Robson	4	3
WC	(United Kingdom) T Moore	3	1
Q	(Czech Republic) Kr Plíšková	6	6
5	(Georgia (country)) A Tatishvili	6^{5}	5
Q	(United States) C Vandeweghe	7^{7}	7
(United Kingdom) H Watson	6^{3}	3
2	(Chinese Taipei) S-w Hsieh	7^{7}	6

Quarterfinals
8	(United Kingdom) A Keothavong	4	6	6
Q	(Czech Republic) Kr Plíšková	6	1	4
Q	(United States) C Vandeweghe	2	7	6
2	(Chinese Taipei) S-w Hsieh	6	5	4

Semifinals
8	(United Kingdom) A Keothavong	3	2
Q	(United States) C Vandeweghe	6	6
