= 2012 Aegon Trophy – Men's singles =

Men's singles
- 2012 Aegon Trophy

Final
- Champions: (Germany) Benjamin Becker
- Runners-up: (Russia) Dmitry Tursunov
- Score: 4–6, 6–1, 6–4

Events
Singles	men	women
Doubles	men	women
← 2011 ·	Aegon Trophy	· 2013 →

Gilles Müller was the defending champion, but chose not to participate.
Benjamin Becker defeated Dmitry Tursunov 4–6, 6–1, 6–4 in the final to win the title.

== Seeds ==
1. (Japan) Go Soeda (first round)
2. (Slovakia) Lukáš Lacko (quarterfinals)
3. (Japan) Tatsuma Ito (first round)
4. (Russia) Dmitry Tursunov (final)
5. (Australia) Marinko Matosevic (semifinals)
6. (Russia) Igor Kunitsyn (quarterfinals)
7. (Canada) Vasek Pospisil (second round)
8. (Estonia) Jürgen Zopp (quarterfinals)

== Main draw ==
=== Key ===
- Q = Qualifier
- WC = Wild card
- LL = Lucky loser
- Alt = Alternate
- SE = Special exempt
- PR = Protected ranking
- ITF = ITF entry
- JE = Junior exempt
- w/o = Walkover
- r = Retired
- d = Defaulted
- SR = Special ranking

=== Finals ===
Semifinals
(Germany) Benjamin Becker	6	4	7^{10}
Q	(United States) R Kendrick	2	6	6^{8}
4	(Russia) Dmitry Tursunov	7^{7}	6
5	(Australia) Marinko Matosevic	6^{5}	3

Final
(Germany) Benjamin Becker	4	6	6
4	(Russia) Dmitry Tursunov	6	1	4

=== Top half ===
First round
1	(Japan) G Soeda	4	6	2
(France) A Mannarino	6	4	6
(Germany) B Becker	6^{3}	7	6
(Belgium) R Bemelmans	7^{7}	5	4
Alt	(Lithuania) R Berankis	7	5	6
(Russia) E Donskoy	5	7	4
(South Africa) R de Voest	4	7^{9}	1
7	(Canada) V Pospisil	6	6^{7}	6
3	(Japan) T Ito	4	6^{4}
(United States) J Levine	6	7^{7}
(United States) R Sweeting	4	4
Q	(United States) R Kendrick	6	6
WC	(United Kingdom) Andrew Fitzpatrick	1	1
Q	(Denmark) F Nielsen	6	6
WC	(United Kingdom) J Goodall	6^{2}	2
6	(Russia) I Kunitsyn	7^{7}	6

Second round
(France) A Mannarino	2	1
(Germany) B Becker	6	6
Alt	(Lithuania) R Berankis	6	6
7	(Canada) V Pospisil	4	4
(United States) J Levine	6^{4}	6	2
Q	(United States) R Kendrick	7^{7}	4	6
Q	(Denmark) F Nielsen	1	6	6^{1}
6	(Russia) I Kunitsyn	6	3	7^{7}

Quarterfinals
(Germany) B Becker	6	6^{5}	6
Alt	(Lithuania) R Berankis	1	7^{7}	0
Q	(United States) R Kendrick	6	6
6	(Russia) I Kunitsyn	4	4

Semifinals
(Germany) B Becker	6	4	7^{10}
Q	(United States) R Kendrick	2	6	6^{8}

=== Bottom half ===
First round
8	(Estonia) J Zopp	6^{2}	6	7
(South Africa) I van der Merwe	7^{7}	3	5
(France) K de Schepper	3	6	6
(Slovakia) K Beck	6	3	3
(United Kingdom) J Ward	2	7^{7}	6
WC	(United Kingdom) J Baker	6	6^{3}	1
Q	(Russia) D Matsukevitch	2	1
4	(Russia) D Tursunov	6	6
5	(Australia) M Matosevic	6	7^{7}
Alt	(United States) D Kudla	4	6^{4}
Q	(Ukraine) I Marchenko	6	7^{7}
(Netherlands) I Sijsling	4	6^{1}
(United States) B Reynolds	3	6^{6}
(Ukraine) S Bubka	6	7^{8}
WC	(United Kingdom) O Golding	6	2	1
2	(Slovakia) L Lacko	3	6	6

Second round
8	(Estonia) J Zopp	7^{7}	4	6
(France) K de Schepper	6^{4}	6	3
(United Kingdom) J Ward	3	3
4	(Russia) D Tursunov	6	6
5	(Australia) M Matosevic	7^{7}	7^{7}
Q	(Ukraine) I Marchenko	6^{5}	6^{4}
(Ukraine) S Bubka	6^{4}	3
2	(Slovakia) L Lacko	7^{7}	6

Quarterfinals
8	(Estonia) J Zopp	4	3
4	(Russia) D Tursunov	6	6
5	(Australia) M Matosevic	7^{7}	7^{7}
2	(Slovakia) L Lacko	6^{4}	6^{5}

Semifinals
4	(Russia) D Tursunov	7^{7}	6
5	(Australia) M Matosevic	6^{5}	3
