= 2014 Aegon Trophy – Women's singles =

Women's singles
- 2014 Aegon Trophy

Final
- Champion: (Czech Republic) Kristýna Plíšková
- Runner-up: (Kazakhstan) Zarina Diyas
- Score: 6–2, 3–6, 6–4

Events
Singles	men	women
Doubles	men	women
← 2013 ·	Aegon Trophy	· 2015 →

Petra Martić was the defending champion, having won the event in 2013, but chose not to compete in 2014.

Monica Puig, Christina McHale, Urszula Radwańska and Tadeja Majerič withdrew from the tournament, giving places to all four of the losing players from the final round of qualifying.

Kristýna Plíšková won the title, defeating Zarina Diyas in the final, 6–2, 3–6, 6–4.

== Seeds ==
1. (Puerto Rico) ~~Monica Puig~~ (withdrew due to illness)
2. (United States) ~~Christina McHale~~ (withdrew due to hand injury)
3. (Canada) Sharon Fichman (quarterfinals)
4. (Poland) ~~Urszula Radwańska~~ (withdrew)
5. (Kazakhstan) Zarina Diyas (final)
6. (United States) Coco Vandeweghe (second round)
7. (Croatia) Mirjana Lučić-Baroni (first round)
8. (United Kingdom) Johanna Konta (semifinals)

== Main draw ==
=== Key ===
- Q = Qualifier
- WC = Wild card
- LL = Lucky loser
- Alt = Alternate
- SE = Special exempt
- PR = Protected ranking
- ITF = ITF entry
- JE = Junior exempt
- w/o = Walkover
- r = Retired
- d = Defaulted
- SR = Special ranking

=== Finals ===
Semifinals
(Czech Republic) Kristýna Plíšková	7	7^{7}
8	(United Kingdom) Johanna Konta	5	6^{2}
5	(Kazakhstan) Zarina Diyas	6	7
(Portugal) Michelle Larcher de Brito	2	5

Final
(Czech Republic) Kristýna Plíšková	6	3	6
5	(Kazakhstan) Zarina Diyas	2	6	4

=== Top half ===
First round
LL	(Japan) R Ozaki	6	3	1
(Poland) M Linette	2	6	6
(Italy) N Burnett	3	7	3
Q	(Estonia) A Kontaveit	6	5	6
(Czech Republic) Kr Plíšková	7^{10}	6
(United States) S Rogers	6^{8}	4
WC	(United Kingdom) K Dunne	6	0	6
7	(Croatia) M Lučić-Baroni	4	6	1
3	(Canada) S Fichman	6	6
(United States) M Brengle	4	0
WC	(United Kingdom) E Webley-Smith	2	2
(Serbia) V Dolonc	6	6
(China) S Zheng	4	1
Q	(Russia) M Sirotkina	6	6
(Czech Republic) A Hlaváčková	3	2
8	(United Kingdom) J Konta	6	6

Second round
(Poland) M Linette	5	3
Q	(Estonia) A Kontaveit	7	6
(Czech Republic) Kr Plíšková	6	6
WC	(United Kingdom) K Dunne	3	3
3	(Canada) S Fichman	6	6
(Serbia) V Dolonc	2	2
Q	(Russia) M Sirotkina	5	3
8	(United Kingdom) J Konta	7	6

Quarterfinals
Q	(Estonia) A Kontaveit	3	6^{5}
(Czech Republic) Kr Plíšková	6	7^{7}
3	(Canada) S Fichman	6^{7}	5
8	(United Kingdom) J Konta	7^{9}	7

Semifinals
(Czech Republic) Kr Plíšková	7	7^{7}
8	(United Kingdom) J Konta	5	6^{2}

=== Bottom half ===
First round
5	(Kazakhstan) Z Diyas	6	3	6
(Australia) O Rogowska	2	6	0
(Austria) T Paszek	6^{4}	0^{r}
WC	(United Kingdom) N Broady	7^{7}	0
(Ukraine) N Kichenok	3	1
(United States) M Oudin	6	6
(Japan) A Morita	6	7^{7}
LL	(United States) J Boserup	0	6^{5}
6	(United States) C Vandeweghe	5	7	6
LL	(Australia) An Rodionova	7	5	1
Q	(Thailand) N Lertcheewakarn	6	3	1
(Portugal) M Larcher de Brito	3	6	6
Q	(Greece) E Daniilidou	7	4	6
WC	(United Kingdom) T Moore	5	6	3
(United States) I Falconi	7	6
LL	(Australia) Ar Rodionova	5	1

Second round
5	(Kazakhstan) Z Diyas	7	3	6
WC	(United Kingdom) N Broady	5	6	2
(United States) M Oudin	6	6
(Japan) A Morita	1	3
6	(United States) C Vandeweghe	6	3	5
(Portugal) M Larcher de Brito	3	6	7
Q	(Greece) E Daniilidou	0	6	6
(United States) I Falconi	6	4	0

Quarterfinals
5	(Kazakhstan) Z Diyas	6	6^{3}	6
(United States) M Oudin	1	7^{7}	3
(Portugal) M Larcher de Brito	3	6	6
Q	(Greece) E Daniilidou	6	1	1

Semifinals
5	(Kazakhstan) Z Diyas	6	7
(Portugal) M Larcher de Brito	2	5
