= 2012 Aegon Trophy – Men's doubles =

Men's doubles
- 2012 Aegon Trophy

Final
- Champions: (Philippines) Treat Conrad Huey (United Kingdom) Dominic Inglot
- Runners-up: (United Kingdom) Jonathan Marray (Denmark) Frederik Nielsen
- Score: 6–4, 6–7^{(9–11)}, [10–8]

Events
Singles	men	women
Doubles	men	women
← 2011 ·	Aegon Trophy	· 2013 →

Colin Fleming and Ross Hutchins were the defending champions but they were defeated in the quarterfinals by Eric Butorac and Rik de Voest.

The fourth seeded team of Treat Conrad Huey and Dominic Inglot defeated Jonathan Marray and Frederik Nielsen in the final to take the title, 6–4, 6–7^{(9–11)}, [10–8].

== Seeds ==
1. (United Kingdom) Colin Fleming / (United Kingdom) Ross Hutchins (quarterfinals)
2. (United States) Scott Lipsky / (United States) Rajeev Ram (quarterfinals)
3. (United States) James Cerretani / (Canada) Adil Shamasdin (first round)
4. (Philippines) Treat Conrad Huey / (United Kingdom) Dominic Inglot (Champions)

== Draw ==
=== Key ===
- Q = Qualifier
- WC = Wild card
- LL = Lucky loser
- Alt = Alternate
- SE = Special exempt
- PR = Protected ranking
- ITF = ITF entry
- JE = Junior exempt
- w/o = Walkover
- r = Retired
- d = Defaulted
- SR = Special ranking

=== Draw ===
First round
1	(United Kingdom) C Fleming (United Kingdom) R Hutchins	6	6
WC	(United Kingdom) J Baker (United Kingdom) O Golding	4	2
(United States) E Butorac (South Africa) R de Voest	7^{7}	6
(United Kingdom) J Delgado (United Kingdom) K Skupski	6^{5}	4
3	(United States) J Cerretani (Canada) A Shamasdin	6	3	[7]
(Australia) M Matosevic (United States) B Reynolds	3	6	[10]
(United Kingdom) J Marray (Denmark) F Nielsen	6	6
(Slovakia) K Beck (Slovakia) L Lacko	1	1
(Russia) I Kunitsyn (Russia) D Tursunov	5	4
(United States) JP Fruttero (South Africa) R Klaasen	7	6
(Australia) C Ball (South Africa) I van der Merwe	4	7^{7}	[7]
4	(Philippines) TC Huey (United Kingdom) D Inglot	6	6^{5}	[10]
WC	(United Kingdom) D Rice (United Kingdom) S Thornley	7^{7}	6
(Japan) T Ito (India) D Sharan	6^{5}	3
WC	(United Kingdom) J Goodall (United Kingdom) J Ward	6	6^{3}	[8]
2	(United States) S Lipsky (United States) R Ram	3	7^{7}	[10]

Quarterfinals
1	(United Kingdom) C Fleming (United Kingdom) R Hutchins	6^{4}	6^{4}
(United States) E Butorac (South Africa) R de Voest	7^{7}	7^{7}
(Australia) M Matosevic (United States) B Reynolds	1	4
(United Kingdom) J Marray (Denmark) F Nielsen	6	6
(United States) JP Fruttero (South Africa) R Klaasen	6^{4}	4
4	(Philippines) TC Huey (United Kingdom) D Inglot	7^{7}	6
WC	(United Kingdom) D Rice (United Kingdom) S Thornley	4	6	[10]
2	(United States) S Lipsky (United States) R Ram	6	4	[3]

Semifinals
(United States) E Butorac (South Africa) R de Voest	3	2
(United Kingdom) J Marray (Denmark) F Nielsen	6	6
4	(Philippines) TC Huey (United Kingdom) D Inglot	7^{7}	7^{7}
WC	(United Kingdom) D Rice (United Kingdom) S Thornley	6^{1}	6^{5}

Final
(United Kingdom) J Marray (Denmark) F Nielsen	4	7^{11}	[8]
4	(Philippines) TC Huey (United Kingdom) D Inglot	6	6^{9}	[10]
