= 2012 Aegon Trophy – Women's doubles =

Women's doubles
- 2012 Aegon Trophy

Final
- Champions: (Greece) Eleni Daniilidou (Australia) Casey Dellacqua
- Runners-up: (United Kingdom) Laura Robson (United Kingdom) Heather Watson
- Score: 6–4, 6–2

Events
| Singles | men | women |
| Doubles | men | women |
| ← 2011 · | Aegon Trophy | · 2013 → |

Kimiko Date-Krumm and Zhang Shuai were the defending champions but decided not to participate.
Eleni Daniilidou and Casey Dellacqua, defeated Laura Robson and Heather Watson, 6–4, 6–2, to take the title.

== Seeds ==
1. (Greece) Eleni Daniilidou / (Australia) Casey Dellacqua (champions)
2. (United Kingdom) Anne Keothavong / (United States) Abigail Spears (first round)
3. (Czech Republic) Karolína Plíšková / (Czech Republic) Kristýna Plíšková (quarterfinals)
4. (Chinese Taipei) Chang Kai-chen / (Chinese Taipei) Hsieh Su-wei (first round)

== Draw ==
=== Key ===
- Q = Qualifier
- WC = Wild card
- LL = Lucky loser
- Alt = Alternate
- SE = Special exempt
- PR = Protected ranking
- ITF = ITF entry
- JE = Junior exempt
- w/o = Walkover
- r = Retired
- d = Defaulted
- SR = Special ranking

=== Draw ===
First round
1 | (Greece) E Daniilidou (Australia) C Dellacqua | 7 | 6
(Romania) M Gojnea (Russia) M Sirotkina | 5 | 2
WC | (United Kingdom) S Murray (United Kingdom) E Webley-Smith | 6 | 6^{4} | [8]
(France) S Foretz Gacon (France) S Lefèvre | 2 | 7^{7} | [10]
3 | (Czech Republic) Ka Plíšková (Czech Republic) Kr Plíšková | 6 | 7
(Thailand) N Lertcheewakarn (Russia) V Savinykh | 3 | 5
(United States) L Lee-Waters (United States) M Moulton-Levy | 4 | 2
(Austria) T Paszek (Georgia (country)) A Tatishvili | 6 | 6
WC | (United Kingdom) L Robson (United Kingdom) H Watson | 6 | 6
(Australia) M Adamczak (Japan) E Sema | 3 | 4
(United States) M Oudin (Switzerland) C Perrin | 6 | 3 | [10]
4 | (Chinese Taipei) K-c Chang (Chinese Taipei) S-w Hsieh | 3 | 6 | [7]
(Italy) A Brianti (Australia) O Rogowska | 6 | 3 | [3]
(Australia) S Bengson (Australia) D Jeflea | 2 | 6 | [10]
WC | (United Kingdom) T Moore (United Kingdom) M South | 6 | 6
2 | (United Kingdom) A Keothavong (United States) A Spears | 3 | 2

Quarterfinals
1 | (Greece) E Daniilidou (Australia) C Dellacqua | 6 | 6
(France) S Foretz Gacon (France) S Lefèvre | 2 | 3
3 | (Czech Republic) Ka Plíšková (Czech Republic) Kr Plíšková | 4 | 6 | [7]
(Austria) T Paszek (Georgia (country)) A Tatishvili | 6 | 1 | [10]
WC | (United Kingdom) L Robson (United Kingdom) H Watson | w/o
(United States) M Oudin (Switzerland) C Perrin
(Australia) S Bengson (Australia) D Jeflea | 5 | 6 | [6]
WC | (United Kingdom) T Moore (United Kingdom) M South | 7 | 2 | [10]

Semifinals
1 | (Greece) E Daniilidou (Australia) C Dellacqua | 7 | 6
(Austria) T Paszek (Georgia (country)) A Tatishvili | 5 | 4
WC | (United Kingdom) L Robson (United Kingdom) H Watson | 6 | 6
WC | (United Kingdom) T Moore (United Kingdom) M South | 1 | 2

Final
1 | (Greece) E Daniilidou (Australia) C Dellacqua | 6 | 6
WC | (United Kingdom) L Robson (United Kingdom) H Watson | 4 | 2
