= 2013 Aegon Trophy – Men's singles =

Men's singles
- 2013 Aegon Trophy

Final
- Champion: (Australia) Matthew Ebden
- Runner-up: (Germany) Benjamin Becker
- Score: 7–5, 4–6, 7–5

Events
Singles	men	women
Doubles	men	women
← 2012 ·	Aegon Trophy	· 2014 →

Benjamin Becker was the defending champion but lost to Matthew Ebden 5–7, 6–4, 5–7 in the final.

== Seeds ==
1. (Australia) Marinko Matosevic (second round)
2. (Israel) Dudi Sela (second round)
3. (Canada) Jesse Levine (second round)
4. (France) Kenny de Schepper (semifinals)
5. (United States) Ryan Harrison (first round)
6. (United States) Rajeev Ram (second round)
7. (Germany) Benjamin Becker (final)
8. (Canada) Vasek Pospisil (first round)

== Draw ==
Key

- Q = Qualifier
- WC = Wild card
- LL = Lucky loser
- Alt = Alternate
- ITF = ITF entry
- PR = Protected ranking
- SR = Special ranking
- SE = Special exempt
- JE = Junior exempt
- JR = Junior Accelerator Programme entrant
- CO = College Accelerator Programme entrant
- NG = Next Gen Accelerator Program entrant
- w/o = Walkover
- r = Retired
- d = Defaulted

=== Finals ===
Semifinals
7	(Germany) Benjamin Becker	6	6
4	(France) Kenny de Schepper	2	1
(Australia) Matthew Ebden	6	7
(United States) Bobby Reynolds	2	5

Final
7	(Germany) Benjamin Becker	5	6	5
(Australia) Matthew Ebden	7	4	7

=== Top half ===
First round
1	(Australia) M Matosevic	6	7
Q	(Australia) S Groth	3	5
Q	(United Kingdom) J Baker	6^{4}	4
(France) A Mannarino	7^{7}	6
(Belgium) M Authom	4	4
(United States) S Johnson	6	6
(Germany) M Bachinger	5	7^{7}	3
7	(Germany) B Becker	7	6^{5}	6
4	(France) K de Schepper	6	7^{14}
(United States) R Williams	3	6^{12}
(Australia) J Duckworth	5	3
(United States) T Smyczek	7	6
WC	(United Kingdom) A Bogdanovic	3	5
(Germany) M Berrer	6	7
(United States) D Young	7^{7}	7
8	(Canada) V Pospisil	6^{5}	5

Second round
1	(Australia) M Matosevic	4	3
(France) A Mannarino	6	6
(United States) S Johnson	6^{3}	6	2
7	(Germany) B Becker	7^{7}	3	6
4	(France) K de Schepper	6	6
(United States) T Smyczek	3	4
(Germany) M Berrer	6	7
(United States) D Young	4	5

Quarterfinals
(France) A Mannarino	4	1
7	(Germany) B Becker	6	6
4	(France) K de Schepper	4	6	6
(Germany) M Berrer	6	1	4

Semifinals
7	(Germany) B Becker	6	6
4	(France) K de Schepper	2	1

=== Bottom half ===
First round
5	(United States) R Harrison	7^{7}	0	6^{5}
WC	(United Kingdom) D Evans	6^{3}	6	7^{7}
Q	(India) P Amritraj	6	3	2
Q	(United Kingdom) B Klein	2	6	6
(Australia) M Ebden	7	6
(Japan) T Ito	5	2
(Japan) G Soeda	3	5
3	(Canada) J Levine	6	7
6	(United States) R Ram	6	7^{7}
WC	(United Kingdom) J Goodall	4	6^{4}
WC	(United Kingdom) E Corrie	5	5
(Belgium) R Bemelmans	7	7
(Ukraine) I Marchenko	6^{2}	6^{5}
(United States) B Reynolds	7^{7}	7^{7}
(United States) D Kudla	1	2
2	(Israel) D Sela	6	6

Second round
WC	(United Kingdom) D Evans	6	6
Q	(United Kingdom) B Klein	2	2
(Australia) M Ebden	5	6	6
3	(Canada) J Levine	7	3	2
6	(United States) R Ram	3	2
(Belgium) R Bemelmans	6	6
(United States) B Reynolds	6	6
2	(Israel) D Sela	3	1

Quarterfinals
WC	(United Kingdom) D Evans	6^{1}	2
(Australia) M Ebden	7^{7}	6
(Belgium) R Bemelmans	6	5	4
(United States) B Reynolds	3	7	6

Semifinals
(Australia) M Ebden	6	7
(United States) B Reynolds	2	5
