= 2014 Aegon Trophy – Men's singles =

Men's singles
- 2014 Aegon Trophy

Final
- Champion: (Cyprus) Marcos Baghdatis
- Runner-up: (Australia) Marinko Matosevic
- Score: 6–4, 6–3

Events
Singles	men	women
Doubles	men	women
← 2013 ·	Aegon Trophy	· 2015 →

Matthew Ebden was the defending champion, but withdrew before the commencement of the tournament.

Marcos Baghdatis won the title, defeating Marinko Matosevic in the final, 6–4, 6–3.

== Seeds ==
1. (Netherlands) Igor Sijsling (semifinals)
2. (United States) Steve Johnson (quarterfinals)
3. (Australia) Marinko Matosevic (final)
4. (Germany) Benjamin Becker (first round)
5. (France) Kenny de Schepper (quarterfinals)
6. (Australia) Matthew Ebden (withdrew)
7. (Japan) Go Soeda (first round)
8. (Israel) Dudi Sela (second round)

== Draw ==
=== Key ===
- Q = Qualifier
- WC = Wild card
- LL = Lucky loser
- Alt = Alternate
- SE = Special exempt
- PR = Protected ranking
- ITF = ITF entry
- JE = Junior exempt
- w/o = Walkover
- r = Retired
- d = Defaulted
- SR = Special ranking

=== Finals ===
Semifinals
1	(Netherlands) Igor Sijsling	4	2
Alt	(Cyprus) Marcos Baghdatis	6	6
3	(Australia) Marinko Matosevic	6^{5}	7^{7}	6
(Luxembourg) Gilles Müller	7^{7}	6^{2}	3

Final
Alt	(Cyprus) Marcos Baghdatis	6	6
3	(Australia) Marinko Matosevic	4	3

=== Top half ===
First round
1	(Netherlands) I Sijsling	6	6
Q	(United Kingdom) M Willis	3	1
Q	(Australia) B Mitchell	7^{7}	7
(United States) R Ram	6^{2}	5
Alt	(Austria) M Fischer	6	6
(United States) A Kuznetsov	4	4
WC	(United Kingdom) K Edmund	4	6	2
8	(Israel) D Sela	6	2	6
4	(Germany) B Becker	4	4
Alt	(Cyprus) M Baghdatis	6	6
(United States) D Kudla	6	6
Q	(New Zealand) M Venus	2	2
(Australia) N Kyrgios	4	6^{5}
Q	(Australia) J-P Smith	6	7^{7}
WC	(United Kingdom) D Rice	6	3	1
5	(France) K de Schepper	2	6	6

Second round
1	(Netherlands) I Sijsling	6	3	6
Q	(Australia) B Mitchell	2	6	3
Alt	(Austria) M Fischer	6	6
8	(Israel) D Sela	3	1
Alt	(Cyprus) M Baghdatis	6	6
(United States) D Kudla	4	4
Q	(Australia) J-P Smith	3	7^{7}	3
5	(France) K de Schepper	6	6^{3}	6

Quarterfinals
1	(Netherlands) I Sijsling	6	6
Alt	(Austria) M Fischer	4	4
Alt	(Cyprus) M Baghdatis	6	7^{7}
5	(France) K de Schepper	4	6^{1}

Semifinals
1	(Netherlands) I Sijsling	4	2
Alt	(Cyprus) M Baghdatis	6	6

=== Bottom half ===
First round
LL	(Bulgaria) D Kutrovsky	6	3	6
WC	(United Kingdom) D Smethurst	3	6	2
(United States) R Harrison	6	3	6
(Japan) H Moriya	1	6	0
WC	(United Kingdom) D Cox	5	5
(United Kingdom) D Evans	7	7
(Australia) J Duckworth	1	6^{4}
3	(Australia) M Matosevic	6	7^{7}
7	(Japan) G Soeda	6^{3}	7^{12}	6^{0}
(Luxembourg) G Müller	7^{7}	6^{10}	7^{7}
(Belgium) R Bemelmans	5	2
(Chinese Taipei) J Wang	7	6
(Japan) Y Sugita	1	3
(Germany) M Berrer	6	6
(United Kingdom) J Ward	3	3
2	(United States) S Johnson	6	6

Second round
LL	(Bulgaria) D Kutrovsky	6	2	7^{9}
(United States) R Harrison	4	6	6^{7}
(United Kingdom) D Evans	5	1
3	(Australia) M Matosevic	7	6
(Luxembourg) G Müller	7^{8}	6^{4}	6
(Chinese Taipei) J Wang	6^{6}	7^{7}	4
(Germany) M Berrer	3	5
2	(United States) S Johnson	6	7

Quarterfinals
LL	(Bulgaria) D Kutrovsky	3	6^{4}
3	(Australia) M Matosevic	6	7^{7}
(Luxembourg) G Müller	7	7^{7}
2	(United States) S Johnson	5	6^{3}

Semifinals
3	(Australia) M Matosevic	6^{5}	7^{7}	6
(Luxembourg) G Müller	7^{7}	6^{2}	3
