= 2014 Aegon Trophy – Men's doubles =

Men's doubles
- 2014 Aegon Trophy

Final
- Champion: (Australia) Chris Guccione (United States) Rajeev Ram
- Runner-up: (United Kingdom) Colin Fleming (Brazil) Andre Sá
- Score: 6–7^{(2–7)}, 6–2, [11–9]

Events
Singles	men	women
Doubles	men	women
- Aegon Trophy

Jamie Murray and John Peers were the defending champions, but decided not to compete.

Chris Guccione and Rajeev Ram won the title, defeating Colin Fleming and Andre Sá in the final, 6–7^{(2–7)}, 6–2, [11–9].

== Seeds ==
1. (United Kingdom) Colin Fleming / (Brazil) Andre Sá (final)
2. (United Kingdom) Ken Skupski / (United Kingdom) Neal Skupski (quarterfinals)
3. (United States) Nicholas Monroe / (India) Divij Sharan (first round)
4. (Australia) Chris Guccione / (United States) Rajeev Ram (champions)

== Draw ==
Key

- Q = Qualifier
- WC = Wild card
- LL = Lucky loser
- Alt = Alternate
- ITF = ITF entry
- PR = Protected ranking
- SR = Special ranking
- SE = Special exempt
- JE = Junior exempt
- JR = Junior Accelerator Programme entrant
- CO = College Accelerator Programme entrant
- NG = Next Gen Accelerator Program entrant
- w/o = Walkover
- r = Retired
- d = Defaulted

=== Draw ===
First round
1	(United Kingdom) C Fleming (Brazil) A Sá	6^{4}	6	[12]
WC	(United Kingdom) L Burton (United Kingdom) M Willis	7^{7}	2	[10]
(Thailand) Sa Ratiwatana (Thailand) So Ratiwatana	6	6
(United States) S Johnson (United States) D Kudla	2	3
3	(United States) N Monroe (India) D Sharan	6^{7}	7^{7}	[3]
(United States) R Harrison (United States) K King	7^{9}	6^{3}	[10]
(Germany) B Becker (Germany) M Berrer	6^{7}	3
(Australia) P Hanley (Chinese Taipei) J Wang	7^{9}	6
(Belgium) R Bemelmans (Netherlands) I Sijsling	5	7^{7}	[7]
(United Kingdom) J Delgado (Luxembourg) G Müller	7	6^{3}	[10]
Q	(United States) A Krajicek (United States) R Williams	6^{6}	4
4	(Australia) C Guccione (United States) R Ram	7^{8}	6
WC	(United Kingdom) D Rice (United Kingdom) S Thornley	6	6
(New Zealand) M Venus (Australia) A Whittington	4	4
WC	(United Kingdom) E Corrie (United Kingdom) D Smethurst	3	2
2	(United Kingdom) K Skupski (United Kingdom) N Skupski	6	6

Quarterfinals
1	(United Kingdom) C Fleming (Brazil) A Sá	6	6
(Thailand) Sa Ratiwatana (Thailand) So Ratiwatana	3	4
(United States) R Harrison (United States) K King	6	3	[9]
(Australia) P Hanley (Chinese Taipei) J Wang	3	6	[11]
(United Kingdom) J Delgado (Luxembourg) G Müller	3	6	[7]
4	(Australia) C Guccione (United States) R Ram	6	3	[10]
WC	(United Kingdom) D Rice (United Kingdom) S Thornley	4	6	[10]
2	(United Kingdom) K Skupski (United Kingdom) N Skupski	6	4	[4]

Semifinals
1	(United Kingdom) C Fleming (Brazil) A Sá	4	7^{7}	[10]
(Australia) P Hanley (Chinese Taipei) J Wang	6	6^{3}	[3]
4	(Australia) C Guccione (United States) R Ram	7^{7}	7^{7}
WC	(United Kingdom) D Rice (United Kingdom) S Thornley	6^{5}	6^{3}

Final
1	(United Kingdom) C Fleming (Brazil) A Sá	7^{7}	2	[9]
4	(Australia) C Guccione (United States) R Ram	6^{2}	6	[11]
