= Urszula Radwańska =

Polish tennis player (born 1990)

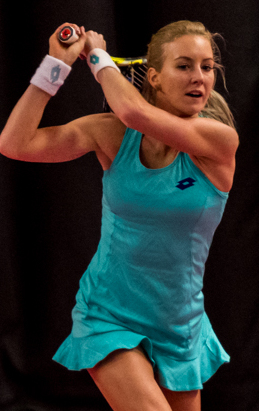
- Radwańska in 2018
- Country (sports): Poland
- Residence: Kraków, Poland
- Born: 7 December 1990 (age 35) Ahaus, Germany
- Height: 1.77 m (5 ft 10 in)
- Turned pro: 2005
- Plays: Right-handed (two-handed backhand)
- Coach: Maciej Domka
- Prize money: $2,143,245
- Official website: teamula.com

Singles
- Career record: 457–373
- Career titles: 0 WTA, 7 ITF
- Highest ranking: No. 29 (8 October 2012)
- Current ranking: No. 420 (21 October 2024)

Grand Slam singles results
- Australian Open: 2R (2012)
- French Open: 2R (2012, 2013)
- Wimbledon: 2R (2008, 2009, 2013, 2015)
- US Open: 2R (2010, 2013)

Doubles
- Career record: 111–73
- Career titles: 1 WTA, 11 ITF
- Highest ranking: No. 74 (21 September 2009)
- Current ranking: No. 585 (21 October 2024)

Grand Slam doubles results
- Australian Open: 2R (2009, 2012)
- French Open: QF (2009)
- Wimbledon: 3R (2012)
- US Open: 1R (2008, 2009, 2010)

Team competitions
- Fed Cup: 15–16
- Last updated on: 21 October 2024.

Urszula Radwańska (Polish: [urˈʂula raˈdvaj̃ska]; born 7 December 1990) is a Polish professional tennis player.

Radwańska has won one doubles title on the WTA Tour, as well as seven singles and eleven doubles titles on the ITF Women's Circuit. On 8 October 2012, she reached her career-high singles ranking of world No. 29. On 21 September 2009, she peaked at No. 74 in the doubles rankings. As a junior player, Radwańska won the 2007 Wimbledon girls' singles title, culminating in the junior year-ending world No. 1 ranking.

Nicknamed Ula, she is the younger sister of Agnieszka Radwańska.

== Tennis career ==
As a junior player, Radwańska won Grand Slam titles, including the 2007 Wimbledon girls' singles, culminating in the junior year-ending world No. 1 ranking. This was the launching pad into her professional career, where she has been getting into WTA main draws via qualifying and wildcards.

In 2007, Radwańska played in the main draw of three WTA Tour tournaments. She lost in the first round of the Tier II Warsaw Open in Warsaw, the second round of the Tier III Japan Open in Tokyo, and the quarterfinals of the Tier III Bangkok Open after defeating fourth-seeded Virginie Razzano in the third round. Urszula and Agnieszka Radwańska won a doubles title together at the İstanbul Cup.

At the 2008 Wimbledon Championships, Radwańska made her Grand Slam singles debut, losing in the second round to two-time champion Serena Williams 4–6, 4–6. Having seen the fight she put up in this match, the commentator Andrew Castle observed: "She is sound in just about all areas, and she knows what to do with the ball, she seems to have an understanding, a little like Martina Hingis."

=== 2009: Breaking into the top 100 ===
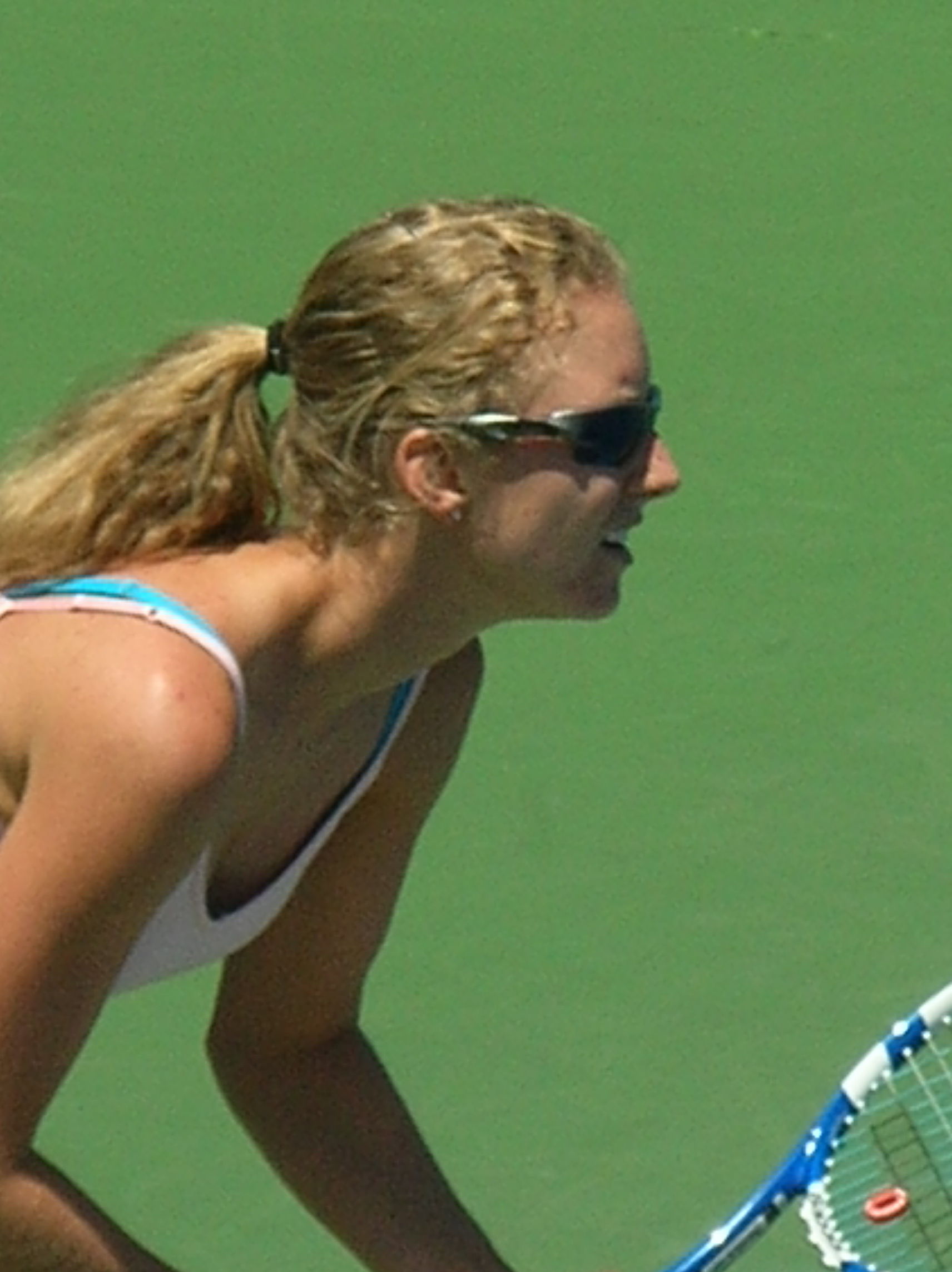
Radwańska practicing at the 2010 Silicon Valley Classic

On 16 February 2009, the Radwańska sisters played their first official tour match against each other in the first round of the Dubai Tennis Championships. Urszula won the match in straight sets 6–4, 6–3 hitting six aces and 25 winners.

At the Indian Wells Open, she defeated sixth-seeded Svetlana Kuznetsova in three sets, the highest ranked player she had ever defeated. She then lost to ninth-seeded Caroline Wozniacki in her first ever WTA fourth-round match. Her results at this tournament caused her singles ranking to break into the top 100 for the first time.

In the second Grand Slam tournament of the year, the French Open, Radwańska lost in the first round to Yanina Wickmayer. She advanced to the second round of the Wimbledon Championships, falling to No. 14, Dominika Cibulková. She then competed in the US Open, losing to Kristina Barrois in the opening round.

=== 2010–2011: First WTA Tour semifinal ===
Radwańska lost in the first round of 2010 Australian Open to eventual champion Serena Williams. She was then forced to take a break to undergo lumbar spine surgery in Miami, Florida. Following a six-month break, she returned to action in August. At the US Open, she scored her first main-draw win of the year by defeating Anna Chakvetadze, but lost her next round to Lourdes Domínguez Lino.

Radwańska then lost in the qualifying draw of the 2011 Australian Open. She advanced to the third round at the Indian Wells Open, before falling to Victoria Azarenka. However, she was unable to qualify for the French Open or the Wimbledon Championships. Subsequently, she won three qualifying matches at the US Open to make the main draw before she lost to her sister Agnieszka in the first round. She reached her first WTA Tour semifinal at the Tashkent Open, eventually losing to top seed Ksenia Pervak.

=== 2012: Breaking into the top 30 ===
Radwańska began her season at the Sydney International. She qualified for the main draw defeating wildcard Sally Peers, eighth seed Iveta Benešová, and 13th seed Vania King. In the first round, she lost to her sister and seventh seed Agnieszka 1–6, 1–6. Ranked 99 at the Australian Open, Radwańska defeated qualifier Alison Riske in the first round, before losing to Sorana Cîrstea 6–1, 2–6, 3–6. She reached the second round of the French Open, losing to fourth seed Petra Kvitová. Radwańska started the grass-court season playing the $75k tournament in Nottingham. She saved three match points in her opening round against Misaki Doi and went on to win the title. Weather forced the semifinals and final to be played on the same day. Radwańska won both matches in three sets, defeating Irina Falconi in and CoCo Vandeweghe. This result granted her qualification into the main draw for the London Olympics. She reached her first career final at the Rosmalen Open where she lost to Nadia Petrova.

At Wimbledon, Radwańska lost her first round to Marina Erakovic. She teamed up with her sister in doubles; they advanced to the third round before withdrawing due to Agnieszka's illness.

She started out the summer hardcourt season at the Silicon Valley Classic and Southern California Open where she reached the quarterfinals of both events. In London Olympics, she lost to eventual champion Serena Williams (2–6, 3–6). Partnering with her sister in doubles, she lost in the second round to the top seeded team Liezel Huber/Lisa Raymond.

Returning to hardcourts, she qualified for the main draw at Rogers Cup and Western & Southern Open where she lost to Ekaterina Makarova and Serena Williams respectively. At the US Open she lost in the first round to 20th seed Roberta Vinci, who subsequently eliminated her older sister in the fourth round.

She reached back-to-back semifinal at the Tashkent Open and Guangzhou International Open but fell to Irina-Camelia Begu and Hsieh Su-wei, respectively. Both went on to win the title. At the Pan Pacific Open, she defeated Ana Ivanovic in the second round but lost to Angelique Kerber in the third. She lost in the first round of the China Open to Romina Oprandi, and defeated Francesca Schiavone at the first round of the Kremlin Cup. Her season ended with a loss to Caroline Wozniacki in round two. Radwańska finished the season with a 47–29 record.

=== 2013: Fed Cup success ===
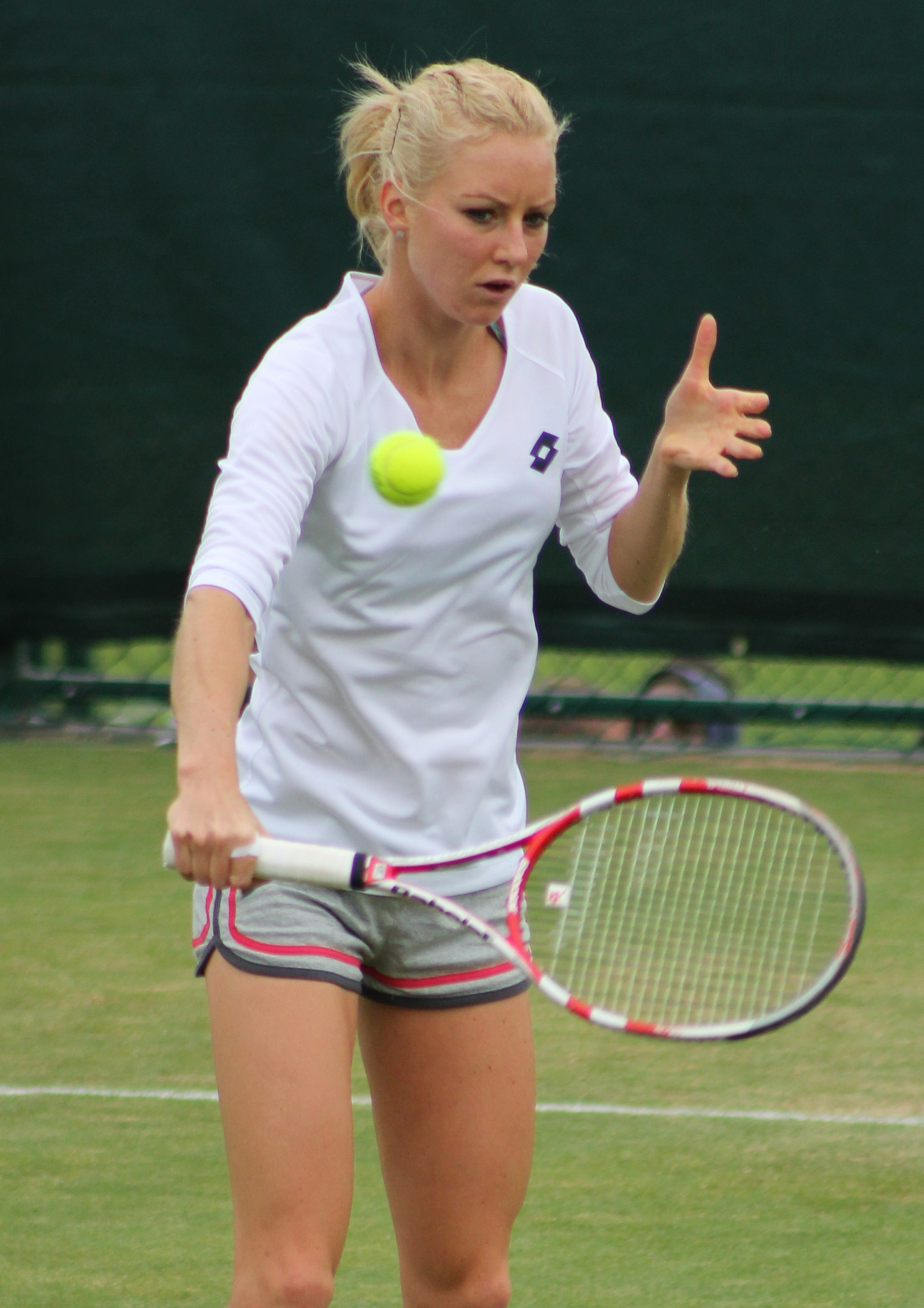
At Wimbledon, 2013

Radwańska began the season at Brisbane where she scored a three-set win over Tamira Paszek in the first round. She then lost in the second to qualifier Ksenia Pervak. Radwańska played her final tournament before the Australian Open at the Sydney International. She was defeated in the first round by seventh seed Caroline Wozniacki. Radwańska was seeded for the first time of her career at a major event at the Australian Open. However, she fell in round one to Jamie Hampton.

After the Australian Open, Radwańska competed at the Open GdF Suez. She lost in the first round to eventual champion Mona Barthel. Radwańska won her first tour match of 2013 at the Qatar Ladies Open defeating Nadiia Kichenok in the first round. She then upset 15th seed Roberta Vinci in the second round. Her run ended as she lost in the third round to second seed, Serena Williams. Radwańska qualified for the Dubai Championships beating Yuliya Beygelzimer, Akgul Amanmuradova, and Kurumi Nara. She lost in the first round of the main draw to Zheng Jie. In March, Radwańska played at the Indian Wells Open where she beat Arantxa Rus in her first-round match. In the second round, she upset 15th seed Sloane Stephens. In the third round, she got the victory over Jamie Hampton. In the fourth round, she lost to top seed and defending champion, Victoria Azarenka. She played at the Miami Open where she won her first-round match over Annika Beck but then lost to 12th seed Ana Ivanovic. Seeded seventh at the Monterrey Open, Radwańska lost in the quarterfinals to third seed Maria Kirilenko.

Radwańska began her clay-court season at the Portugal Open. She upset second seed Dominika Cibulková in her first-round match. In the second round, she lost to Ayumi Morita. At the Madrid Open, Radwańska was defeated in the first round by seventh seed Sara Errani. Her final tournament before Roland Garros was the Italian Open. In the first round, she upset 15th seed Ana Ivanovic, before she fell in the second to Ayumi Morita. Ranked 40 at the French Open, Radwańska stunned 30th seed and seven time Grand Slam champion Venus Williams in the first round. She lost in the second round to qualifier Dinah Pfizenmaier.

Urszula began her grass-court season at the Birmingham Classic. Seeded eighth and receiving a first-round bye, she was defeated in the second round by eventual finalist Donna Vekić. Seeded seventh at the Rosmalen Open, Urszula lost in the quarterfinals to fourth seed and eventual finalist Kirsten Flipkens. Ranked 44 at the Wimbledon Championships, Urszula lost in the second round to American wildcard Alison Riske.

Radwańska began her US Open Series by playing at the Silicon Valley Classic. She won comfortably over Christina McHale and Daniela Hantuchová, before losing in the quarterfinals to third seed and eventual champion Dominika Cibulková. The week after Stanford, Radwańska stayed in California and competed at the Southern California Open. She beat qualifier Marina Erakovic and sixth seed Jelena Janković in her first two rounds. She was defeated in the quarterfinals by top seed and eventual finalist Victoria Azarenka. Urszula suffered a first-round loss at the Rogers Cup to Flavia Pennetta. As the top seed for qualifying at the Western & Southern Open, she was defeated in the first round of qualifying by Petra Martić. Ranked 38t at the US Open, she lost in the second round to 15th seed Sloane Stephens.

Seeded fifth at the Guangzhou International, Radwańska was defeated in the first round by Vesna Dolonc. In Tokyo at the Pan Pacific Open, she lost in the first round to 16th seed Dominika Cibulková. Radwańska played her final tournament of the year at the China Open. She upset 16th seed Simona Halep in her first-round match and lost in the second round to Maria Kirilenko.

Radwańska ended the year ranked 43.

=== 2014: Shoulder injury and fall from top 200 ===
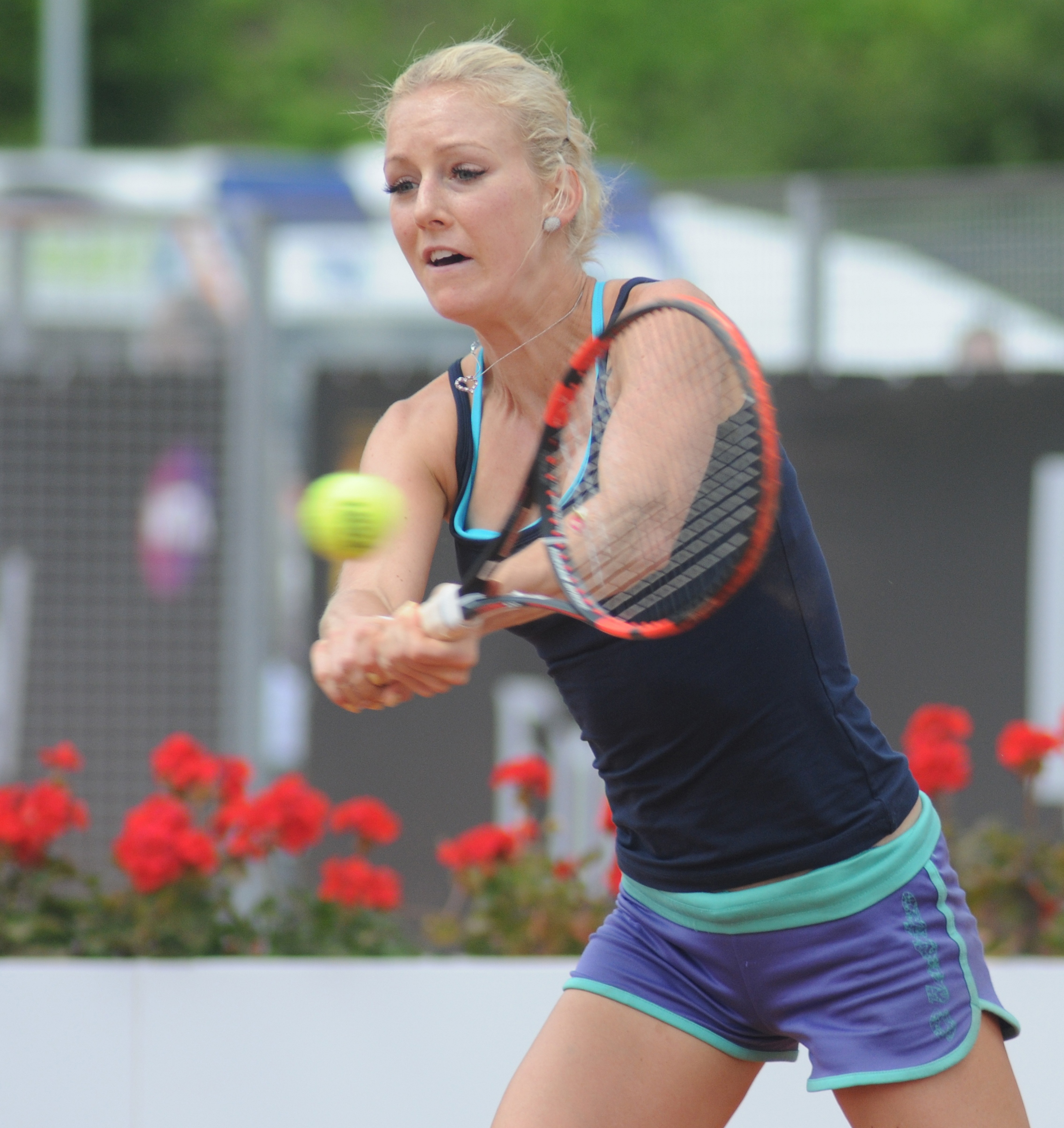
At the 2014 Internazionali d'Italia

Radwańska pulled out of the Australian Open due to a shoulder injury.

Radwańska began her 2014 season in February when she played at the Dow Tennis Classic in Midland. As the top seed, she defeated Sachia Vickery and Kateřina Siniaková in her first two rounds. Her run ended as she lost in the quarterfinals to sixth seed Sharon Fichman. At the Abierto Mexicano, Radwańska was defeated in the first round by top seed and eventual champion Dominika Cibulková. After Acapulco, Radwańska competed at Indian Wells where she lost her first-round match to Aleksandra Wozniak. The following week, she was defeated in the first round of the Miami Open by Nadia Petrova. The week after, Radwańska played at the Monterrey Open where she lost in the first round to second seed and eventual champion, Ana Ivanovic. During the Fed Cup Play-off tie versus Spain, Radwańska lost both of her rubbers to María Teresa Torró Flor and Silvia Soler Espinosa. Despite her losses, Poland was still able to win the tie 3–2.

Radwańska began her clay-court preparation for the French Open at the Marrakesh Grand Prix. She was defeated in the first round by qualifier Lara Arruabarrena. At the Portugal Open, Radwańska lost in the first round to Yanina Wickmayer. At the Madrid Open, she was defeated in the first round of qualifying by Laura Pous Tió. At the Italian Open, Radwańska lost in the final round of qualifying to Belinda Bencic. Ranked 79 at the French Open, she retired during her first-round match against Magdaléna Rybáriková.

Starting her grass-court season at the Birmingham Classic, Radwańska was defeated in the first round by 16th seed Casey Dellacqua. In 's-Hertogenbosch, Radwańska lost in the final round of qualifying to Mona Barthel. At the Wimbledon Championships, Radwańska was defeated in her first-round match by ninth seed Angelique Kerber.

=== 2015: New coach and getting back to form ===
Radwańska started the season with the hiring of her new coach, Maciej Domka, a former tennis player. She reached three WTA quarterfinals at Auckland Open, Monterrey Open and İstanbul Cup. In July, she took out the last seed standing, Tsvetana Pironkova, to reach her first WTA semifinal in almost three years at the İstanbul Cup. She defeated Magdaléna Rybáriková for a place in the final. The final match effectively hinged on a tight first set in which Radwańska held three set points on the Lesia Tsurenko serve at 5–4. It was a disappointing outcome for Radwańska, who was also defeated on her only previous appearance in a WTA Tour final, in Rosmalen three years ago. In August, Radwańska participated in the US Open, but fell to Magda Linette in the first round and ended the season ranked No. 95.

=== 2016: Ankle injury and fall from top 200 ===
Radwańska began her season at the Australian Open where she lost to Ana Konjuh in three sets. She continued at Taiwan Open, where she defeated Hsu Ching-wen but lost to Venus Williams in the second round. Next, she qualified for the main draw of the Mexican Open where she faced Anastasia Pavlyuchenkova. However, she was forced to retire during the match with an ankle injury.

Radwańska returned to the ITF Circuit in July, when she reached the quarterfinals at the Stockton Challenger in California. She continued at the Stanford Classic, where she defeated Kateryna Bondarenko but lost to Dominika Cibulková in the second round.

She ended the year ranked 261.

=== 2017: Fall from top 500 ===
Radwańska ended the year with a ranking of No. 524.

== Business career ==
In addition to her tennis career, Urszula Radwańska is also a businesswoman, and created and now owns the UR brand of luxury handbags.

== Performance timelines ==
Key
W	F	SF	QF	#R	RR	Q#	DNQ	A	NH

(W) winner; (F) finalist; (SF) semifinalist; (QF) quarterfinalist; (#R) rounds 4, 3, 2, 1; (RR) round-robin stage; (Q#) qualification round; (DNQ) did not qualify; (A) absent; (NH) not held; (SR) strike rate (events won / competed); (W–L) win–loss record.
To avoid confusion and double counting, these charts are updated at the conclusion of a tournament or when the player's participation has ended.

=== Singles ===
Current through the 2022 Australian Open.

Tournament	2006	2007	2008	2009	2010	2011	2012	2013	2014	2015	2016	2017	...	2020	2021	2022	W–L
Grand Slam tournaments
Australian Open	A	A	A	A	1R	A	2R	1R	A	1R	1R	A		Q1	A	Q1	1–5
French Open	A	A	A	1R	A	Q1	2R	2R	1R	Q1	A	A		A	Q1		2–4
Wimbledon	A	A	2R	2R	A	Q1	1R	2R	1R	2R	Q2	A		NH	Q3		4–6
US Open	A	A	A	1R	2R	1R	1R	2R	Q2	1R	Q1	A		A	Q2		2–6
Win–loss	0–0	0–0	1–1	1–3	1–2	0–1	2–4	3–4	0–2	1–3	0–1	0–0		0–0	0–0	0–0	9–21
Olympic Games
Summer Olympics	NH		A	NH			2R	NH			A	NH			A		1–1
WTA 1000
Qatar / Dubai Open	NMS		1R	2R	A	A	1R	3R	A	A	A	A		A	A		3–4
Indian Wells Open	A	A	1R	4R	A	3R	1R	4R	1R	Q1	A	A		NH	A		8–6
Miami Open	A	A	A	1R	A	1R	1R	2R	1R	2R	A	Q1		NH	A		2–6
Madrid Open	NH			A	A	A	A	1R	Q1	A	A	A		NH	A		0–1
Italian Open	A	A	A	A	A	A	A	2R	Q2	1R	A	A		A	A		1–2
Cincinnati Open	NMS			1R	Q1	A	3R	Q1	Q1	Q1	A	A		NH	A		2–2
Canadian Open	A	A	A	Q2	Q2	A	1R	1R	Q2	Q1	A	A		A	A		0–2
Pan Pacific / Wuhan Open	A	A	A	1R	Q1	1R	3R	1R	NP5					NH			2–4
China Open	NMS			1R	A	Q1	1R	2R	A	A	A	A		NH			1–3
Career statistics
Titles	0	0	0	0	0	0	0	0	0	0	0	0		0	0	0	0
Finals	0	0	0	0	0	0	1	0	0	1	0	0		0	0	0	2
Overall win–loss	2–3	3–3	3–6	15–22	1–3	10–11	26–25	21–23	3–14	13–17	2–5	0–0		0–0	0–5	0–0	99–137

=== Doubles ===
Tournament	2008	2009	2010	2011	2012	...	2022	W–L
Australian Open	A	2R	1R	A	2R		A	2–3
French Open	1R	QF	A	A	1R			3–3
Wimbledon	A	1R	A	2R	3R			3–3
US Open	1R	1R	1R	A	A			0–3
Win–loss	0–2	4–4	0–2	1–1	3–3		0–0	8–12

== WTA Tour finals ==
=== Singles: 2 (runner-ups) ===
Legend Grand Slam WTA 1000 WTA 500 International / WTA 250	Finals by surface Hard (0–1) Grass (0–1) Clay (0–0) Carpet (0–0)

Result	W–L	Date	Tournament	Tier	Surface	Opponent	Score
Loss	0–1	Jun 2012	Rosmalen Open, Netherlands	International	Grass	(Russia) Nadia Petrova	4–6, 3–6
Loss	0–2	Jul 2015	İstanbul Cup, Turkey	International	Hard	(Ukraine) Lesia Tsurenko	5–7, 1–6

=== Doubles: 1 (title) ===
Legend Grand Slam WTA 1000 WTA 500 International / WTA 250	Finals by surface Hard (0–0) Grass (0–0) Clay (1–0) Carpet (0–0)

Result	W–L	Date	Tournament	Tier	Surface	Partner	Opponents	Score
Win	1–0	May 2007	İstanbul Cup, Turkey	International	Clay	(Poland) Agnieszka Radwańska	(Chinese Taipei) Chan Yung-jan (India) Sania Mirza	6–1, 6–3

== ITF Circuit finals ==
=== Singles: 18 (7 titles, 11 runner–ups) ===
Legend
$75,000 tournaments
$50/60,000 tournaments
$25,000 tournaments
$10,000 tournaments

Result	W–L	Date	Tournament	Tier	Surface	Opponent	Score
Win	1–0	Apr 2006	ITF Bath, United Kingdom	10,000	Hard (i)	(Canada) Valérie Tétreault	7–6^{(6)}, 6–2
Loss	0–1	May 2006	ITF Warsaw, Poland	10,000	Clay	(Poland) Natalia Kołat	6–3, 5–7, 1–6
Loss	1–2	Nov 2007	ITF Kunming, China	50,000	Hard	(Belgium) Yanina Wickmayer	5–7, 4–6
Win	2–2	Jul 2008	Vancouver Open, Canada	50,000	Hard	(France) Julie Coin	2–6, 6–3, 7–5
Loss	2–3	Dec 2008	Dubai Tennis Challenge, United Arab Emirates	75,000	Hard	(Russia) Vitalia Diatchenko	5–7, 6–2, 5–7
Loss	2–4	Oct 2010	Open de Saint-Raphaël, France	50,000	Hard (i)	(United States) Alison Riske	4–6, 2–6
Win	3–4	Nov 2010	Ismaning Open, Germany	50,000	Carpet (i)	(Czech Republic) Andrea Hlaváčková	7–5, 6–4
Win	4–4	Jun 2012	Nottingham Trophy, UK	75,000	Grass	(United States) CoCo Vandeweghe	6–1, 4–6, 6–1
Loss	4–5	Oct 2014	Open de Touraine, France	50,000	Hard (i)	(Germany) Carina Witthöft	3–6, 6–7^{(6)}
Loss	4–6	Apr 2018	ITF Óbidos, Portugal	25,000	Carpet	(United Kingdom) Katie Boulter	6–4, 3–6, 3–6
Win	5–6	Jan 2019	ITF Petit-Bourg, Guadeloupe	25,000	Hard	(Mexico) Ana Sofía Sánchez	6–1, 2–6, 6–1
Loss	5–7	Mar 2019	ITF Kazan, Russia	25,000	Hard (i)	(Kazakhstan) Elena Rybakina	2–6, 3–6
Loss	5–8	May 2019	ITF Obidos, Portugal	25,000	Carpet	(Turkey) Pemra Özgen	5–7, 0–3 ret.
Win	6–8	Sep 2019	ITF Clermont-Ferrand, France	25,000	Hard (i)	(Belgium) Lara Salden	6–7^{(2)}, 6–3, 6–1
Loss	6–9	Dec 2019	ITF Solarino, Italy	25,000	Carpet	(Netherlands) Indy de Vroome	1–6, 2–6
Win	7–9	Feb 2021	ITF Moscow, Russia	25,000	Hard (i)	(Belarus) Yuliya Hatouka	4–6, 6–3, 6–4
Loss	7–10	Mar 2021	ITF Kazan, Russia	25,000	Hard (i)	(Belarus) Yuliya Hatouka	6–7^{(6)}, 6–4, 4–6
Loss	7–11	Nov 2022	Calgary Challenger, Canada	60,000	Hard (i)	(United States) Robin Montgomery	6–7^{(6)}, 5–7

=== Doubles: 18 (12 titles, 6 runner–ups) ===
Legend
$100,000 tournaments
$50,000 tournaments
$25,000 tournaments
$10,000 tournaments

Result	W–L	Date	Tournament	Tier	Surface	Partner	Opponents	Score
Win	1–0	Aug 2005	ITF Gdynia, Poland	10,000	Clay	(Poland) Agnieszka Radwańska	(Ukraine) Katerina Avdiyenko (Ukraine) Natalia Bogdanova	6–1, 6–1
Win	2–0	Aug 2005	ITF Kędzierzyn-Koźle, Poland	25,000	Clay	(Poland) Agnieszka Radwańska	(Czech Republic) Renata Voráčová (Czech Republic) Sandra Záhlavová	6–1, 6–4
Loss	2–1	Oct 2005	ITF Istanbul, Turkey	25,000	Hard (i)	(Poland) Agnieszka Radwańska	(Hungary) Zsofia Gubasci (Ukraine) Mariya Koryttseva	3–6, 3–6
Loss	2–2	Nov 2005	ITF Minsk, Belarus	25,000	Carpet (i)	(Poland) Agnieszka Radwańska	(Belarus) Ekaterina Dzehalevich (Belarus) Darya Kustova	3–6, 3–6
Win	3–2	Feb 2006	ITF Buchen, Germany	10,000	Carpet (i)	(Ukraine) Katerina Avdiyenko	(Czech Republic) Lucie Kriegsmannová (Czech Republic) Zuzana Zálabská	w/o
Win	4–2	Apr 2006	ITF Bath, United Kingdom	10,000	Hard (i)	(Slovakia) Martina Babáková	(France) Marie-Pierrine Baudouin (France) Karla Mraz	6–3, 6–1
Loss	4–3	May 2006	ITF Warsaw, Poland	10,000	Clay	(Germany) Justine Ozga	(Latvia) Irina Kuzmina (Ukraine) Oksana Teplyakova	0–6, 1–6
Loss	4–4	Feb 2007	ITF Tipton, UK	25,000	Hard (i)	(Russia) Ksenia Lykina	(Netherlands) Kim Kilsdonk (Netherlands) Elise Tamaëla	3–6, 3–6
Win	5–4	Feb 2007	Biberach Open, Germany	25,000	Hard (i)	(Russia) Nina Bratchikova	(Croatia) Darija Jurak (Bosnia and Herzegovina) Sandra Martinović	6–2, 6–0
Win	6–4	Aug 2007	Bronx Open, United States	50,000	Hard	(Czech Republic) Lucie Hradecká	(Ukraine) Mariya Koryttseva (Belarus) Darya Kustova	6–3, 1–6, 6–1
Win	7–4	Nov 2007	ITF Kunming, China	50,000	Hard	(Belgium) Yanina Wickmayer	(China) Han Xinyun (China) Xu Yifan	6–4, 6–1
Win	8–4	Nov 2008	Kraków Open, Poland	100,000	Hard (i)	(Germany) Angelique Kerber	(Poland) Olga Brózda (Poland) Sandra Zaniewska	6–3, 6–2
Loss	8–5	Oct 2010	Tokyo Open, Japan	100,000	Hard	(Ukraine) Olga Savchuk	(United States) Jill Craybas (Thailand) Tamarine Tanasugarn	3–6, 1–6
Win	9–5	Jul 2011	Open de Biarritz, France	100,000	Clay	(Russia) Alexandra Panova	(Japan) Erika Sema (Brazil) Roxane Vaisemberg	6–2, 6–1
Win	10–5	May 2012	Open de Cagnes-sur-Mer, France	100,000	Clay	(Russia) Alexandra Panova	(Hungary) Katalin Marosi (Czech Republic) Renata Voráčová	7–5, 4–6, [10–6]
Win	11–5	Apr 2024	Open de Calvi, France	W50+H	Hard	(Switzerland) Valentina Ryser	(United Kingdom) Sarah Beth Grey (France) Amandine Hesse	6–3, 6–2
Loss	11–6	Apr 2024	Lopota Open, Georgia	W50	Hard	(Japan) Nagi Hanatani	(Slovakia) Viktória Hrunčáková (Czech Republic) Tereza Valentová	2–6, 1–6
Win	12–6	Mar 2025	Branik Maribor Open, Slovenia	W75	Hard (i)	(France) Julie Belgraver	(United Kingdom) Lily Miyazaki (France) Jessika Ponchet	6–1, 6–4

== Junior Grand Slam tournament finals ==
=== Singles: 2 (1 title, 1 runner–up) ===
Result	Year	Tournament	Surface	Opponent	Score
Win	2007	Wimbledon	Grass	(United States) Madison Brengle	2–6, 6–3, 6–0
Loss	2007	US Open	Hard	(Slovakia) Kristína Kučová	3–6, 6–1, 6–7^{(4–7)}

=== Doubles: 4 (3 titles, 1 runner–up) ===
Result	Year	Tournament	Surface	Partner	Opponents	Score
Loss	2007	Australian Open	Hard	(United States) Julia Cohen	(Russia) Evgeniya Rodina (Russia) Arina Rodionova	6–2, 3–6, 1–6
Win	2007	French Open	Clay	(Belarus) Ksenia Milevskaya	(Romania) Sorana Cîrstea (United States) Alexa Glatch	6–1, 6–4
Win	2007	Wimbledon	Grass	(Russia) Anastasia Pavlyuchenkova	(Japan) Misaki Doi (Japan) Kurumi Nara	6–4, 2–6, [10–7]
Win	2007	US Open	Hard	(Belarus) Ksenia Milevskaya	(Georgia (country)) Oksana Kalashnikova (Russia) Ksenia Lykina	6–1, 6–2

== ITF Junior Circuit finals ==
=== Singles (5–5) ===
Legend
Category GA (1–1)
Category G1 (2–1)
Category G2 (2–1)
Category G3 (0–0)
Category G4 (0–2)

Result	No.	Date	Tournament	Tier	Surface	Opponent	Score
Loss	1.	Aug 2004	ITF Zabrze, Poland	Grade 4	Clay	(Poland) Agnieszka Radwańska	4–6, 4–6
Loss	2.	Aug 2004	ITF Warsaw, Poland	Grade 4	Clay	(Russia) Anastasia Pavlyuchenkova	4–6, 6–2, 4–6
Loss	3.	Jan 2005	ITF Bratislava, Slovakia	Grade 2	Carpet (i)	(Poland) Agnieszka Radwańska	2–6, 6–7^{(1–7)}
Loss	4.	Jul 2005	ITF Wels, Austria	Grade 1	Clay	(Poland) Agnieszka Radwańska	2–6, 3–6
Win	1.	Jan 2006	ITF Bratislava, Slovakia	Grade 2	Carpet (i)	(Poland) Anna Korzeniak	7–6^{(7–1)}, 7–5
Win	2.	Jan 2006	ITF Přerov, Czech Republic	Grade 1	Carpet (i)	(Netherlands) Marlot Meddens	6–2, 6–2
Win	3.	Dec 2006	ITF Bradenton, United States	Grade 1	Hard	(Romania) Sorana Cîrstea	6–3, 6–1
Win	4.	Jun 2007	ITF Halle, Germany	Grade 2	Grass	(Poland) Katarzyna Piter	6–0, 6–3
Win	5.	Jul 2007	Wimbledon, United Kingdom	Grade A	Grass	(United States) Madison Brengle	2–6, 6–3, 6–0
Loss	5.	Sep 2007	US Open	Grade A	Hard	(Slovakia) Kristína Kučová	3–6, 6–1, 6–7^{(4–7)}

=== Doubles (16–1) ===
Legend
Category GA (1–0)
Category G1 (2–0)
Category G2 (6–0)
Category G3 (1–0)
Category G4 (3–0)

Result	No.	Date	Tournament	Surface	Partner	Opponents	Score
Win	1.	17 January 2004	Bergheim, Austria	Carpet (i)	(Poland) Agnieszka Radwańska	(Germany) Tatjana Malek (Germany) Miriam Steinhilber	6–4, 6–0
Win	2.	20 June 2004	Gdynia, Poland	Clay	(Poland) Agnieszka Radwańska	(Latvia) Ieva Irbe (United Kingdom) Maria Spenceley	6–2, 6–2
Win	3.	15 August 2004	Zabrze, Poland	Clay	(Poland) Agnieszka Radwańska	(Belarus) Alena Bayarchyk (Belarus) Katsarina Zheltova	6–1, 6–4
Win	4.	19 September 2004	Prague, Czech Republic	Clay	(Poland) Agnieszka Radwańska	(Czech Republic) Gabriela Bergmannová (Czech Republic) Eva Kadlecová	3–6, 6–0, 7–5
Win	5.	23 January 2005	Bratislava, Slovakia	Carpet (i)	(Poland) Agnieszka Radwańska	(Belgium) Claudia Smolders (Belgium) Aude Vermoezen	6–1, 6–0
Win	6.	6 March 2005	Nürnberg, Germany	Carpet (i)	(Poland) Agnieszka Radwańska	(Russia) Ekaterina Makarova (Russia) Evgeniya Rodina	6–4, 7–6^{(7–2)}
Win	7.	15 May 2005	Sankt Pölten, Austria	Clay	(Poland) Agnieszka Radwańska	(Czech Republic) Kateřina Kramperová (Austria) Tamira Paszek	6–1, 6–2
Win	8.	18 June 2005	Halle, Germany	Grass	(Poland) Agnieszka Radwańska	(Germany) Julia Görges (Georgia (country)) Ia Jikia	6–4, 6–2
Win	9.	17 July 2005	Wels, Austria	Clay	(Poland) Agnieszka Radwańska	(Netherlands) Marrit Boonstra (Netherlands) Renée Reinhard	7–5, 6–2
Win	10.	22 January 2006	Bratislava, Slovakia	Carpet (i)	(Slovakia) Monika Kochanová	(Russia) Aleksandra Kulikova (Russia) Anastasia Petukhova	6–4, 0–6, 6–2
Win	11.	29 January 2006	Přerov, Czech Republic	Carpet (i)	(Slovakia) Monika Kochanová	(Netherlands) Marlot Meddens (Netherlands) Anouk Tigu	6–2, 6–2
Win	12.	10 December 2006	Key Biscayne, US	Hard	(Romania) Sorana Cîrstea	(Canada) Sharon Fichman (Czech Republic) Kateřina Vaňková	6–3, 6–1
Loss	1.	27 January 2007	Australian Open	Hard	(United States) Julia Cohen	(Russia) Evgeniya Rodina (Russia) Arina Rodionova	6–2, 3–6, 1–6
Win	13.	10 June 2007	French Open	Clay	(Belarus) Ksenia Milevskaya	(Romania) Sorana Cîrstea (United States) Alexa Glatch	6–1, 6–4
Win	14.	23 June 2007	Halle, Germany	Grass	(Poland) Katarzyna Piter	(Australia) Tyra Calderwood (Russia) Elena Chernyakova	6–2, 6–1
Win	15.	8 July 2007	Wimbledon, UK	Grass	(Russia) Anastasia Pavlyuchenkova	(Japan) Misaki Doi (Japan) Kurumi Nara	6–4, 2–6, [10–7]
Win	16.	9 September 2007	US Open	Hard	(Belarus) Ksenia Milevskaya	(Georgia (country)) Oksana Kalashnikova (Russia) Ksenia Lykina	6–1, 6–2

== Head-to-head records ==
=== Record against top-10 players ===
Players who have been ranked world No. 1 are in boldface

- (Italy) Francesca Schiavone 3–0
- (Serbia) **Ana Ivanovic** 2–2
- (Slovakia) Daniela Hantuchová 4–2
- (France) Marion Bartoli 1–0
- (Russia) Anna Chakvetadze 1–0
- (Australia) Jelena Dokić 1–0
- (Switzerland) **Martina Hingis** 1–0
- (Serbia) **Jelena Janković** 2–0
- (Russia) Svetlana Kuznetsova 1–1
- (Italy) Flavia Pennetta 1–0
- (Poland) Agnieszka Radwańska 1–3
- (Belarus) **Victoria Azarenka** 0–1
- (Japan) Kimiko Date-Krumm 0–1
- (Italy) Sara Errani 0–1
- (Germany) **Angelique Kerber** 0–1
- (Czech Republic) Petra Kvitová 0–1
- (China) Li Na 0–1
- (Russia) Anastasia Myskina 0–1
- (Russia) Nadia Petrova 0–1
- (Switzerland) Patty Schnyder 0–1
- (Japan) Ai Sugiyama 0–1
- (United States) **Venus Williams** 1–2
- (Russia) **Maria Sharapova** 0–2
- (Denmark) **Caroline Wozniacki** 0–4
- (United States) **Serena Williams** 0–5

=== Wins over top-10 players per season ===
#	Player	Ranking	Event	Surface	Round	Score
**2009**
1.	(Poland) Agnieszka Radwańska	No. 10	Dubai Championships, UAE	Hard	1R	6–4, 6–3
2.	(Russia) Svetlana Kuznetsova	No. 8	Indian Wells Open, US	Hard	2R	6–2, 4–6, 6–3
**2012**
3.	(France) Marion Bartoli	No. 8	Brussels Open, Belgium	Clay	2R	6–4, 6–2

== Notes ==
Preceded by (Russia) Anastasia Pavlyuchenkova	ITF Junior World Champion; 2007	Succeeded by (Thailand) Noppawan Lertcheewakarn
