= Nicola Slater =

British tennis player

- Country (sports): United Kingdom
- Born: 14 August 1984 (age 40); Ayr, United Kingdom
- Height: 5 ft 8 in (1.73 m)
- Prize money: $42,142

Singles
- Career record: 48–66
- Career titles: 0
- Highest ranking: No. 650 (24 October 2011)

Doubles
- Career record: 103–127
- Career titles: 6 ITF
- Highest ranking: No. 167 (16 September 2013)

Grand Slam doubles results
- Wimbledon: 1R (2013)

Nicola Slater (born 14 August 1984) is a British pickleball player and former tennis player.

Slater won six doubles titles on the ITF Women's Circuit in her career. On 16 September 2013, she reached her best doubles ranking of world No. 167, while she reached her highest singles ranking of world No. 650 in October 2011.

Partnering CoCo Vandeweghe, Slater won her first $50k tournament at the 2013 Clay Court Classic, defeating Nicole Gibbs and Shelby Rogers in the final.

== ITF Circuit finals ==
=== Doubles: 11 (6–5) ===
Legend $75,000 tournaments $50,000 tournaments $25,000 tournaments $10,000 tournaments	Finals by surface Hard (4–2) Clay (1–2) Grass (1–1)

Result	No.	Date	Tournament	Surface	Partner	Opponents	Score
Loss	1.	8 November 2010	Antalya, Turkey	Hard	(Russia) Daria Salnikova	(Czech Republic) Nikola Fraňková (Russia) Marta Sirotkina	6–3, 5–7, [5–10]
Win	1.	16 May 2011	Landisville, United States	Hard	(United States) Hsu Chieh-yu	(Australia) Brooke Rischbieth (Australia) Storm Sanders	7–5, 6–3
Win	2.	23 May 2011	Sumter, United States	Hard	(Australia) Bojana Bobusic	(Australia) Ebony Panoho (Australia) Storm Sanders	4–6, 7–5, [10–6]
Loss	2.	27 February 2012	Antalya, Turkey	Clay	(United States) Sanaz Marand	(Italy) Claudia Giovine (Germany) Anne Schäfer	3–6, 6–3, [7–10]
Win	3.	21 May 2012	Sumter, United States	Hard	(United States) Jan Abaza	(Australia) Elizabeth Ferris (Japan) Mayo Hibi	7–6^{(1)}, 6–3
Loss	3.	16 July 2012	Woking, United Kingdom	Hard	(Spain) Yvonne Cavallé Reimers	(Thailand) Nicha Lertpitaksinchai (Thailand) Peangtarn Plipuech	2–6, 5–7
Win	4.	22 April 2013	Charlottesville, United States	Clay	(United States) CoCo Vandeweghe	(United States) Nicole Gibbs (United States) Shelby Rogers	6–3, 7–6^{(4)}
Win	5.	3 June 2013	Nottingham Trophy, United Kingdom	Grass	(United States) Maria Sanchez	(Canada) Gabriela Dabrowski (Canada) Sharon Fichman	4–6, 6–3, [10–8]
Loss	4.	30 June 2014	Denain, France	Clay	(Australia) Karolina Wlodarczak	(Brazil) Paula Cristina Gonçalves (Argentina) Florencia Molinero	6–7^{(3)}, 6–7^{(4)}
Win	6.	20 October 2014	Challenger de Saguenay, Canada	Hard (i)	(Belgium) Ysaline Bonaventure	(Canada) Sonja Molnar (United States) Caitlin Whoriskey	6–4, 6–4
Loss	5.	8 June 2015	Surbiton Trophy, United Kingdom	Grass	(United Kingdom) Tara Moore	(Ukraine) Lyudmyla Kichenok (Switzerland) Xenia Knoll	6–7^{(6)}, 3–6
