= Nottingham Trophy (tennis) =

Defunct tennis tournament
- Event name: Nottingham Trophy (2021); Aegon Trophy (2009–14)
- Location: Nottingham, United Kingdom
- Venue: Nottingham Tennis Centre
- Surface: Grass
- Website: Official website
ATP Tour
- Category: ATP Challenger Tour
- Draw: 32S/32Q/16D/4Q
- Prize money: €64,000
WTA Tour
- Category: ITF Women's World Tennis Tour
- Draw: 32S/32Q/16D
- Prize money: $100,000+H

The Nottingham Trophy (formerly known as the Aegon Trophy) was an annual tennis tournament played in Nottingham, England. The tournament was part of the ATP Challenger Tour and the International Tennis Federation (ITF Women's Circuit) as a $75,000 event. The tournament's key sponsor was Dutch insurance firm Aegon. The tournament was held at the end of May before the main tour's grass-court season starts.

In 2021, an ATP Challenger Tour and ITF Women's World Tennis Tour event was held in Nottingham, under the name Nottingham Trophy. This event was supposed to be held as the Ilkley Trophy, but moved to Nottingham due to the COVID-19 pandemic.

== Location ==
The tournament was held annually at the Nottingham Tennis Centre within the University Park area of Nottingham.

== History ==
The city used to hold an ATP Tour event, the Nottingham Open; however, due to its failure to attract big names the tournament was merged with the women's Eastbourne International event in 2009. It was merged with Eastbourne due to the LTA wanting to attract an umbrella sponsor and a younger audience to Eastbourne. However, in December 2008, it was announced that Nottingham would take over from Surbiton in hosting the grass court ATP Challenger and ITF event. It started in 2009, replacing the Surbiton Trophy due to the renovation of the facilities that had been undertaken at the Nottingham Tennis Centre. The tournament moved back to Surbiton for the 2015 season. A new WTA International competition commenced on 8 June 2015 instead.

== Past finals ==
=== Men's singles ===
| Year | Champion | Runner-up | Score |
|---|---|---|---|
| 2021 | (Australia) Alex Bolt | (Poland) Kamil Majchrzak | 4–6, 6–4, 6–3 |
| 2015–2020 | Not held | | |
| 2014 | (Cyprus) Marcos Baghdatis | (Australia) Marinko Matosevic | 6–4, 6–3 |
| 2013 | (Australia) Matthew Ebden | (Germany) Benjamin Becker | 7–5, 4–6, 7–5 |
| 2012 | (Germany) Benjamin Becker | (Russia) Dmitry Tursunov | 4–6, 6–1, 6–4 |
| 2011 | (Luxembourg) Gilles Müller | (Germany) Matthias Bachinger | 7–6^{(7–4)}, 6–2 |
| 2010 | (Lithuania) Ričardas Berankis | (Japan) Go Soeda | 6–4, 6–4 |
| 2009 | (United States) Brendan Evans | (Serbia) Ilija Bozoljac | 6–7^{(4–7)}, 6–4, 7–6^{(7–4)} |

=== Women's singles ===
| Year | Champion | Runner-up | Score |
|---|---|---|---|
| 2021 | (Belgium) Alison Van Uytvanck | (Australia) Arina Rodionova | 6–0, 6–4 |
| 2015–2020 | Not held | | |
| 2014 | (Czech Republic) Kristýna Plíšková | (Kazakhstan) Zarina Diyas | 6–2, 3–6, 6–4 |
| 2013 | (Croatia) Petra Martić | (Czech Republic) Karolína Plíšková | 6–3, 6–3 |
| 2012 | (Poland) Urszula Radwańska | (United States) Coco Vandeweghe | 6–1, 4–6, 6–1 |
| 2011 | (Greece) Eleni Daniilidou | (Belarus) Olga Govortsova | 1–6, 6–4, 6–2 |
| 2010 | (United Kingdom) Elena Baltacha | (United States) Carly Gullickson | 6–2, 6–2 |
| 2009 | (Italy) Maria Elena Camerin | (Switzerland) Stefanie Vögele | 6–2, 4–6, 6–1 |

=== Men's doubles ===
| Year | Champions | Runners-up | Score |
|---|---|---|---|
| 2021 | (Australia) Marc Polmans (Australia) Matt Reid | (France) Benjamin Bonzi (France) Antoine Hoang | 6–4, 4–6, [10–8] |
| 2015–2020 | Not held | | |
| 2014 | (Australia) Chris Guccione (United States) Rajeev Ram | (United Kingdom) Colin Fleming (Brazil) Andre Sá | 6–7^{(2–7)}, 6–2, [11–9] |
| 2013 | (United Kingdom) Jamie Murray (Australia) John Peers | (United Kingdom) Ken Skupski (United Kingdom) Neal Skupski | 6–2, 6–7^{(3–7)}, [10–6] |
| 2012 | (Philippines) Treat Conrad Huey (United Kingdom) Dominic Inglot | (United Kingdom) Jonathan Marray (Denmark) Frederik Nielsen | 6–4, 6–7^{(9–11)}, [10–8] |
| 2011 | (United Kingdom) Colin Fleming (United Kingdom) Ross Hutchins | (Germany) Dustin Brown (Germany) Martin Emmrich | 4–6, 7–6^{(8–6)}, [13–11] |
| 2010 | (United Kingdom) Colin Fleming (United Kingdom) Ken Skupski | (United States) Eric Butorac (United States) Scott Lipsky | 7–6^{(7–3)}, 6–4 |
| 2009 | (United States) Eric Butorac (United States) Scott Lipsky | (United Kingdom) Colin Fleming (United Kingdom) Ken Skupski | 6–4, 6–4 |

=== Women's doubles ===
| Year | Champions | Runners-up | Score |
|---|---|---|---|
| 2021 | (Romania) Monica Niculescu (Romania) Elena-Gabriela Ruse | (Australia) Priscilla Hon (Australia) Storm Sanders | 7–5, 7–5 |
| 2015–2020 | Not held | | |
| 2014 | (United Kingdom) Jocelyn Rae (United Kingdom) Anna Smith | (Canada) Sharon Fichman (United States) Maria Sanchez | 7–6^{(7–5)}, 4–6, [10–5] |
| 2013 | (United States) Maria Sanchez (United Kingdom) Nicola Slater | (Canada) Gabriela Dabrowski (Canada) Sharon Fichman | 4–6, 6–3, [10–8] |
| 2012 | (Greece) Eleni Daniilidou (Australia) Casey Dellacqua | (United Kingdom) Laura Robson (United Kingdom) Heather Watson | 6–4, 6–2 |
| 2011 | (Japan) Kimiko Date-Krumm (China) Zhang Shuai | (United States) Raquel Kops-Jones (United States) Abigail Spears | 6–4, 7–6^{(9–7)} |
| 2010 | (United Kingdom) Sarah Borwell (United States) Raquel Kops-Jones | (United Kingdom) Naomi Broady (United Kingdom) Katie O'Brien | 6–3, 2–6, [10–7] |
| 2009 | (United States) Alexa Glatch (South Africa) Natalie Grandin | (Greece) Eleni Daniilidou (Japan) Rika Fujiwara | 6–3, 2–6, [10–7] |
