= 2013 Savannah Challenger – Singles =

Singles
- 2013 Savannah Challenger

Final
- Champion: (United States) Ryan Harrison
- Runner-up: (Argentina) Facundo Argüello
- Score: 6–2, 6–3

Events
Singles	Doubles
- Savannah Challenger

Brian Baker was the defending champion, but chose not to compete.
Ryan Harrison won the final 6–2, 6–3 against Facundo Argüello.

== Seeds ==
1. (United States) Mardy Fish (first round)
2. (United States) Michael Russell (quarterfinals)
3. (United States) Ryan Harrison (champion)
4. (Russia) Alex Bogomolov Jr. (second round)
5. (United States) Rhyne Williams (second round)
6. (United States) Jack Sock (first round)
7. (United States) Wayne Odesnik (quarterfinals)
8. (United States) Tim Smyczek (first round)

== Draw ==
Key

- Q = Qualifier
- WC = Wild card
- LL = Lucky loser
- Alt = Alternate
- ITF = ITF entry
- PR = Protected ranking
- SR = Special ranking
- SE = Special exempt
- JE = Junior exempt
- JR = Junior Accelerator Programme entrant
- CO = College Accelerator Programme entrant
- NG = Next Gen Accelerator Program entrant
- w/o = Walkover
- r = Retired
- d = Defaulted

=== Finals ===
Semifinals
(Spain) Rubén Ramírez Hidalgo	6^{3}	7	2
3	(United States) Ryan Harrison	7^{7}	5	6
(United States) Donald Young	4	3
(Argentina) Facundo Argüello	6	6

Final
3	(United States) Ryan Harrison	6	6
(Argentina) Facundo Argüello	2	3

=== Top half ===
First round
1/WC	(United States) M Fish	6	2	4
(Spain) R Ramírez Hidalgo	2	6	6
WC	(United States) S Bangoura	2	1
Q	(Japan) T Daniel	6	6
Q	(United States) B Fratangelo	6^{6}	1
SE	(United States) A Kuznetsov	7^{8}	6
(Canada) F Dancevic	3	3
5	(United States) R Williams	6	6
3	(United States) R Harrison	6	6
(Germany) M Zverev	2	3
(United States) B Reynolds	3	4
(China) Z Zhang	6	6
Q	(Chile) N Massú	6	6^{5}	7^{7}
SE	(Ukraine) D Molchanov	4	7^{7}	6^{4}
WC	(United States) M Krueger	6	1	0
7	(United States) W Odesnik	3	6	6

Second round
(Spain) R Ramírez Hidalgo	1	7^{7}	6
Q	(Japan) T Daniel	6	6^{4}	2
SE	(United States) A Kuznetsov	6	6
5	(United States) R Williams	3	1
3	(United States) R Harrison	6	6
(China) Z Zhang	3	4
Q	(Chile) N Massú	2	0^{r}
7	(United States) W Odesnik	6	1

Quarterfinals
(Spain) R Ramírez Hidalgo	6	4	6
SE	(United States) A Kuznetsov	4	6	3
3	(United States) R Harrison	6	6
7	(United States) W Odesnik	1	3

Semifinals
(Spain) R Ramírez Hidalgo	6^{3}	7	2
3	(United States) R Harrison	7^{7}	5	6

=== Bottom half ===
First round
6	(United States) J Sock	4	1
(Russia) T Gabashvili	6	6
(Canada) P Polansky	3	2
(Germany) C-M Stebe	6	6
Q	(Venezuela) R Rodríguez	2	4
(United States) D Young	6	6
(United States) D Kudla	6^{6}	3
4	(Russia) A Bogomolov Jr.	7^{8}	6
8	(United States) T Smyczek	5	5
(Argentina) F Argüello	7	7
(India) S Devvarman	6	0
LL	(Georgia (country)) N Basilashvili	4	0^{r}
(United States) S Johnson	3	6	3
WC	(United States) T Sandgren	6	1	6
(United States) B Klahn	0	2
2	(United States) M Russell	6	6

Second round
(Russia) T Gabashvili	6	5	6
(Germany) C-M Stebe	4	7	0
(United States) D Young	7^{7}	6
4	(Russia) A Bogomolov Jr.	6^{5}	4
(Argentina) F Argüello	6	6
(India) S Devvarman	3	4
WC	(United States) T Sandgren	1	5
2	(United States) M Russell	6	7

Quarterfinals
(Russia) T Gabashvili	2	6^{3}
(United States) D Young	6	7^{7}
(Argentina) F Argüello	6	6
2	(United States) M Russell	4	4

Semifinals
(United States) D Young	4	3
(Argentina) F Argüello	6	6
