= 2013 Savannah Challenger – Doubles =

Doubles
- 2013 Savannah Challenger

Final
- Champions: (Russia) Teymuraz Gabashvili (Ukraine) Denys Molchanov
- Runners-up: (United States) Michael Russell (United States) Tim Smyczek
- Score: 6–2, 7–5

Events
Singles	Doubles
- Savannah Challenger

Carsten Ball and Bobby Reynolds were the defending champions but decided not to participate together.
Ball played alongside Ryan Harrison, but they lost to David Rice and Sean Thornley in the first round. Reynolds partnered with Alex Bogomolov Jr., but they withdrew because of a plantar fasciitis injury contracted by Reynolds.
Teymuraz Gabashvili and Denys Molchanov defeated Michael Russell and Tim Smyczek 6–2, 7–5 in the final to win the title.

== Seeds ==
1. (United States) Nicholas Monroe / (United States) Jack Sock (first round)
2. (Australia) Carsten Ball / (United States) Ryan Harrison (first round)
3. (Russia) Alex Bogomolov Jr. / (United States) Bobby Reynolds (quarterfinals, withdrew)
4. (United States) Alex Kuznetsov / (Germany) Mischa Zverev (quarterfinals)

== Draw ==
Key

- Q = Qualifier
- WC = Wild card
- LL = Lucky loser
- Alt = Alternate
- ITF = ITF entry
- PR = Protected ranking
- SR = Special ranking
- SE = Special exempt
- JE = Junior exempt
- JR = Junior Accelerator Programme entrant
- CO = College Accelerator Programme entrant
- NG = Next Gen Accelerator Program entrant
- w/o = Walkover
- r = Retired
- d = Defaulted

=== Draw ===
First round
1	(United States) N Monroe (United States) J Sock	4	3
(United States) M Russell (United States) T Smyczek	6	6
(United States) T Sandgren (United States) R Williams	6	2	[10]
PR	(Serbia) I Bozoljac (India) S Devvarman	3	6	[6]
3	(Russia) A Bogomolov Jr. (United States) B Reynolds	6	7
WC	(United States) B Fratangelo (United States) M Krueger	3	5
(Argentina) F Argüello (Spain) R Ramírez Hidalgo	w/o
WC	(United Kingdom) Daniel Regan (Spain) Georgi Rumenov Payakov
WC	(United States) Reid Carleton (United States) V Mirzadeh	4	4
(Canada) F Dancevic (Canada) P Polansky	6	6
(Germany) C-M Stebe (China) Z Zhang	3	4
4	(United States) A Kuznetsov (Germany) M Zverev	6	6
(United States) S Johnson (United States) B Klahn	2	6^{6}
(Russia) T Gabashvili (Ukraine) D Molchanov	6	7^{8}
Q	(United Kingdom) D Rice (United Kingdom) S Thornley	6	6
2	(Australia) C Ball (United States) R Harrison	4	4

Quarterfinals
(United States) M Russell (United States) T Smyczek	4	7^{7}	[13]
(United States) T Sandgren (United States) R Williams	6	6^{0}	[11]
3	(Russia) A Bogomolov Jr. (United States) B Reynolds
(Argentina) F Argüello (Spain) R Ramírez Hidalgo	w/o
(Canada) F Dancevic (Canada) P Polansky	6	3	[12]
4	(United States) A Kuznetsov (Germany) M Zverev	4	6	[10]
(Russia) T Gabashvili (Ukraine) D Molchanov	7^{7}	6
Q	(United Kingdom) D Rice (United Kingdom) S Thornley	6^{1}	4

Semifinals
(United States) M Russell (United States) T Smyczek	7	7
(Argentina) F Argüello (Spain) R Ramírez Hidalgo	5	5
(Canada) F Dancevic (Canada) P Polansky	2	0
(Russia) T Gabashvili (Ukraine) D Molchanov	6	6

Final
(United States) M Russell (United States) T Smyczek	2	5
(Russia) T Gabashvili (Ukraine) D Molchanov	6	7
