= 2023 Savannah Challenger – Singles =

Singles
- 2023 Savannah Challenger

Final
- Champion: (Argentina) Facundo Díaz Acosta
- Runner-up: (United States) Tristan Boyer
- Score: 6–3, 6–1

Events
Singles	Doubles
- Savannah Challenger

Jack Sock was the defending champion but chose not to defend his title.

Facundo Díaz Acosta won the title after defeating Tristan Boyer 6–3, 6–1 in the final.

== Seeds ==
1. (Belgium) Zizou Bergs (quarterfinals)
2. (Argentina) Facundo Díaz Acosta (champion)
3. (France) Enzo Couacaud (first round)
4. (Argentina) Nicolás Kicker (quarterfinals)
5. (Tunisia) Aziz Dougaz (quarterfinals)
6. (Canada) Alexis Galarneau (first round)
7. (United States) Mitchell Krueger (quarterfinals)
8. (United States) Alex Michelsen (first round)

== Draw ==
Key

- Q = Qualifier
- WC = Wild card
- LL = Lucky loser
- Alt = Alternate
- ITF = ITF entry
- PR = Protected ranking
- SR = Special ranking
- SE = Special exempt
- JE = Junior exempt
- JR = Junior Accelerator Programme entrant
- CO = College Accelerator Programme entrant
- NG = Next Gen Accelerator Program entrant
- w/o = Walkover
- r = Retired
- d = Defaulted

=== Finals ===
Semifinals
(France) Calvin Hemery	6	4	3
Q	(United States) Tristan Boyer	2	6	6
WC	(United States) Patrick Kypson	3	6	4
2	(Argentina) Facundo Díaz Acosta	6	4	6

Final
Q	(United States) Tristan Boyer	3	1
2	(Argentina) Facundo Díaz Acosta	6	6

=== Top half ===
First round
1	(Belgium) Z Bergs	6	6
Alt	(Australia) B Tomic	3	3
WC	(United States) M Damm	6	6
(Kazakhstan) D Yevseyev	1	4
Q	(France) K Jacquet	2	0
PR	(United States) B Fratangelo	6	6
(France) C Hemery	6^{8}	7^{7}	7^{7}
6	(Canada) A Galarneau	7^{10}	6^{4}	6^{4}
3	(France) E Couacaud	2	3
Q	(United States) T Boyer	6	6
Q	(Northern Mariana Islands) C Sinclair	2	6^{1}
Q	(Brazil) M Alves	6	7^{7}
Alt	(United States) N Chappell	2	3
(United States) A Rybakov	6	6
Q	(United States) B Kuzuhara	5	6^{13}
7	(United States) M Krueger	7	7^{15}

Second round
1	(Belgium) Z Bergs	3	7^{7}	6
WC	(United States) M Damm	6	6^{3}	3
PR	(United States) B Fratangelo	6^{1}	3
(France) C Hemery	7^{7}	6
Q	(United States) T Boyer	6	6
Q	(Brazil) M Alves	1	4
(United States) A Rybakov	4	6	0
7	(United States) M Krueger	6	1	6

Quarterfinals
1	(Belgium) Z Bergs	4	6	2
(France) C Hemery	6	2	6
Q	(United States) T Boyer	6	6
7	(United States) M Krueger	4	1

Semifinals
(France) C Hemery	6	4	3
Q	(United States) T Boyer	2	6	6

=== Bottom half ===
First round
8	(United States) A Michelsen	6	3	6^{5}
WC	(United States) P Kypson	4	6	7^{7}
(United States) E Zhu	6	4	6
(Italy) A Arnaboldi	4	6	1
(France) M Martineau	6	3	6
(United States) U Blanch	4	6	4
Alt	(United States) S Kirchheimer	1	1
4	(Argentina) N Kicker	6	6
5	(Tunisia) A Dougaz	6	6
WC	(United States) T Kodat	2	3
Q	(Argentina) FA Gómez	5	6	6
LL	(Germany) Elmar Ejupovic	7	2	4
PR	(New Zealand) R Statham	4	4
(Tunisia) M Echargui	6	6
(United States) O Crawford	1	2
2	(Argentina) F Díaz Acosta	6	6

Second round
WC	(United States) P Kypson	4	6	6
(United States) E Zhu	6	2	1
(France) M Martineau	3	4
4	(Argentina) N Kicker	6	6
5	(Tunisia) A Dougaz	7^{7}	6
Q	(Argentina) FA Gómez	6^{3}	4
(Tunisia) M Echargui	6	3	4
2	(Argentina) F Díaz Acosta	0	6	6

Quarterfinals
WC	(United States) P Kypson	6	6
4	(Argentina) N Kicker	2	3
5	(Tunisia) A Dougaz	3	6	3
2	(Argentina) F Díaz Acosta	6	3	6

Semifinals
WC	(United States) P Kypson	3	6	4
2	(Argentina) F Díaz Acosta	6	4	6
