= 2017 Savannah Challenger – Singles =

Singles
- 2017 Savannah Challenger

Final
- Champion: (United States) Tennys Sandgren
- Runner-up: (Brazil) João Pedro Sorgi
- Score: 6–4, 6–3

Events
Singles	Doubles
- Savannah Challenger

Bjorn Fratangelo was the defending champion but chose not to defend his title.

Tennys Sandgren won the title after defeating João Pedro Sorgi 6–4, 6–3 in the final.

== Seeds ==
1. (Barbados) Darian King (first round)
2. (Switzerland) Henri Laaksonen (quarterfinals)
3. (Canada) Peter Polansky (first round)
4. (Argentina) Leonardo Mayer (first round)
5. (United States) Tennys Sandgren (champion)
6. (United States) Stefan Kozlov (quarterfinals)
7. (Canada) Denis Shapovalov (first round)
8. (United States) Mitchell Krueger (second round)

== Draw ==
Key

- Q = Qualifier
- WC = Wild card
- LL = Lucky loser
- Alt = Alternate
- ITF = ITF entry
- PR = Protected ranking
- SR = Special ranking
- SE = Special exempt
- JE = Junior exempt
- JR = Junior Accelerator Programme entrant
- CO = College Accelerator Programme entrant
- NG = Next Gen Accelerator Program entrant
- w/o = Walkover
- r = Retired
- d = Defaulted

=== Finals ===
Semifinals
(Republic of Ireland) James McGee	6	3	0
(Brazil) João Pedro Sorgi	4	6	6
WC	(United States) Tommy Paul	6	3	6^{5}
5	(United States) Tennys Sandgren	4	6	7^{7}

Final
(Brazil) João Pedro Sorgi	4	3
5	(United States) Tennys Sandgren	6	6

=== Top half ===
First round
1	(Barbados) D King	4	0
WC	(United States) M Giron	6	6
(Slovenia) B Rola	6	6
(Italy) A Arnaboldi	3	2
Q	(Ecuador) G Escobar	6	5	3
Q	(Croatia) A Pavić	2	7	6
(Republic of Ireland) J McGee	3	7^{8}	6
7	(Canada) D Shapovalov	6	6^{6}	4
4	(Argentina) L Mayer	6	5	1
(Australia) C O'Connell	4	7	6
(Brazil) A Ghem	4	3
(Brazil) JP Sorgi	6	6
(India) R Ramanathan	6	7
WC	(United States) R Shane	4	5
Q	(Latvia) M Lībietis	3	4
6	(United States) S Kozlov	6	6

Second round
WC	(United States) M Giron	7	1	6
(Slovenia) B Rola	5	6	3
Q	(Croatia) A Pavić	4	6	6^{5}
(Republic of Ireland) J McGee	6	3	7^{7}
(Australia) C O'Connell	6^{1}	6^{6}
(Brazil) JP Sorgi	7^{7}	7^{8}
(India) R Ramanathan	1	2
6	(United States) S Kozlov	6	6

Quarterfinals
WC	(United States) M Giron	4	5
(Republic of Ireland) J McGee	6	7
(Brazil) JP Sorgi	6	6
6	(United States) S Kozlov	2	2

Semifinals
(Republic of Ireland) J McGee	6	3	0
(Brazil) JP Sorgi	4	6	6

=== Bottom half ===
First round
8	(United States) M Krueger	7	6
(United States) S Bangoura	5	3
WC	(United States) T Paul	6	1	6
(Ecuador) R Quiroz	2	6	3
PR	(Colombia) A González	7^{10}	6
Q	(United States) Wil Spencer	6^{8}	3
(United States) D Novikov	6	2	7^{8}
3	(Canada) P Polansky	4	6	6^{6}
5	(United States) T Sandgren	6	3	6
(United States) M McDonald	4	6	4
WC	(United States) C Harrison	7^{7}	4	7
(Colombia) A Falla	6^{5}	6	5
(United States) M Mmoh	6	3	6
(Colombia) A Gómez	3	6	3
(United States) E King	0	2
2	(Switzerland) H Laaksonen	6	6

Second round
8	(United States) M Krueger	6	6^{6}	0
WC	(United States) T Paul	3	7^{8}	6
PR	(Colombia) A González	7	4	3
(United States) D Novikov	5	6	6
5	(United States) T Sandgren	6	6
WC	(United States) C Harrison	1	4
(United States) M Mmoh	6^{1}	0
2	(Switzerland) H Laaksonen	7^{7}	6

Quarterfinals
WC	(United States) T Paul	6	6
(United States) D Novikov	2	4
5	(United States) T Sandgren	6	5	7^{7}
2	(Switzerland) H Laaksonen	4	7	6^{4}

Semifinals
WC	(United States) T Paul	6	3	6^{5}
5	(United States) T Sandgren	4	6	7^{7}
