= 2017 Savannah Challenger – Doubles =

Doubles
- 2017 Savannah Challenger

Final
- Champions: (Canada) Peter Polansky; (United Kingdom) Neal Skupski
- Runners-up: (United Kingdom) Luke Bambridge; (United States) Mitchell Krueger
- Score: 4–6, 6–3, [10–1]

Events
Singles	Doubles
- Savannah Challenger

Brian Baker and Ryan Harrison were the defending champions but chose not to defend their title.

Peter Polansky and Neal Skupski won the title after defeating Luke Bambridge and Mitchell Krueger 4–6, 6–3, [10–1] in the final.

== Seeds ==
1. (Canada) Peter Polansky / (United Kingdom) Neal Skupski (champions)
2. (Latvia) Miķelis Lībietis / (United States) Max Schnur (semifinals)
3. (United Kingdom) Luke Bambridge / (United States) Mitchell Krueger (final)
4. (United States) Sekou Bangoura / (United States) Mackenzie McDonald (quarterfinals)

== Draw ==
Key

- Q = Qualifier
- WC = Wild card
- LL = Lucky loser
- Alt = Alternate
- ITF = ITF entry
- PR = Protected ranking
- SR = Special ranking
- SE = Special exempt
- JE = Junior exempt
- JR = Junior Accelerator Programme entrant
- CO = College Accelerator Programme entrant
- NG = Next Gen Accelerator Program entrant
- w/o = Walkover
- r = Retired
- d = Defaulted

First round

Quarterfinals

Semifinals

Final

1
- (Canada) P Polansky
- (United Kingdom) N Skupski
6
6

- (Ecuador) G Escobar
- (Colombia) A González
3
3

1
- (Canada) P Polansky
- (United Kingdom) N Skupski
6
6

- (Argentina) F Argüello
- (Argentina) T Lipovšek Puches
4
2

- (Colombia) DE Galán
- (Brazil) JP Sorgi
3
1

- (Colombia) DE Galán
- (Brazil) JP Sorgi
6
6

1
- (Canada) P Polansky
- (United Kingdom) N Skupski
3
7
[11]

4
- (United States) S Bangoura
- (United States) M McDonald
6
6

- (Australia) J Chaplin
- (United States) T Sandgren
6
5
[9]

WC
(United States) Blake Croyder
(United States) Sean Sculley
2
1

4
- (United States) S Bangoura
- (United States) M McDonald
2
4

- (Colombia) A Falla
- (Colombia) A Gómez
1
6^{4}

- (Australia) J Chaplin
- (United States) T Sandgren
6
6

- (Australia) Jarryd Chaplin
- (United States) T Sandgren
6
7^{7}

1
- (Canada) P Polansky
- (United Kingdom) N Skupski
4
6
[10]

WC
(South Africa) Damon Gooch
(United States) Wil Spencer
4
4

3
- (United Kingdom) L Bambridge
- (United States) M Krueger
6
3
[1]

- (Brazil) A Ghem
- (India) R Ramanathan
6
6

- (Brazil) A Ghem
- (India) R Ramanathan
2
3

WC
(Republic of Ireland) J Bradley
(Thailand) Pol Wattanakul
4
4

3
- (United Kingdom) L Bambridge
- (United States) M Krueger
6
6

3
- (United Kingdom) L Bambridge
- (United States) M Krueger
6
6

3
- (United Kingdom) L Bambridge
- (United States) M Krueger
6
2
[10]

- (Philippines) R Gonzales
- (United States) A Lawson
3
6
[8]

2
- (Latvia) M Lībietis
- (United States) M Schnur
1
6
[7]

- (United States) R Galloway
- (United States) E King
6
0
[10]

- (United States) R Galloway
- (United States) E King
3
4

- (Barbados) D King
- (Croatia) A Pavić
6^{6}
5

2
- (Latvia) M Lībietis
- (United States) M Schnur
6
6

2
- (Latvia) M Lībietis
- (United States) M Schnur
7^{8}
7
