= 2016 Savannah Challenger – Singles =

Singles
- 2016 Savannah Challenger

Final
- Champion: (United States) Bjorn Fratangelo
- Runner-up: (United States) Jared Donaldson
- Score: 6–1, 6–3

Events
Singles	Doubles
- Savannah Challenger

Chung Hyeon was the defending champion but chose not to participate. He played in Barcelona during this week.

Bjorn Fratangelo won the title, defeating Jared Donaldson 6–1, 6–3 in the final.

== Seeds ==
1. (United States) Denis Kudla (semifinals)
2. (United States) Donald Young (semifinals)
3. (United States) Tim Smyczek (first round)
4. (Austria) Gerald Melzer (quarterfinals)
5. (Georgia (country)) Nikoloz Basilashvili (first round)
6. (United States) Bjorn Fratangelo (champion)
7. (Argentina) Facundo Argüello (second round)
8. (United States) Jared Donaldson (final)

== Draw ==
Key

- Q = Qualifier
- WC = Wild card
- LL = Lucky loser
- Alt = Alternate
- ITF = ITF entry
- PR = Protected ranking
- SR = Special ranking
- SE = Special exempt
- JE = Junior exempt
- JR = Junior Accelerator Programme entrant
- CO = College Accelerator Programme entrant
- NG = Next Gen Accelerator Program entrant
- w/o = Walkover
- r = Retired
- d = Defaulted

=== Finals ===
Semifinals
1/WC	(United States) Denis Kudla	2	2
6	(United States) Bjorn Fratangelo	6	6
8	(United States) Jared Donaldson	6	6
2	(United States) Donald Young	4	3

Final
6	(United States) Bjorn Fratangelo	6	6
8	(United States) Jared Donaldson	1	3

=== Top half ===
First round
1/WC	(United States) D Kudla	6^{3}	6	6
(Ecuador) G Lapentti	7^{7}	1	2
WC	(United States) B Baker	6	6
WC	(United States) T Paul	3	1
Q	(Canada) P Polansky	7^{8}	4	4
(France) Q Halys	6^{6}	6	6
Q	(Chile) N Jarry	7^{7}	6
5	(Georgia (country)) N Basilashvili	6^{4}	2
3	(United States) T Smyczek	4	2
(United States) F Tiafoe	6	6
(Republic of Ireland) J McGee	5	3
Q	(Argentina) T Lipovšek Puches	7	6
(Switzerland) H Laaksonen	7	6
(United States) D Novikov	5	1
(France) C Hemery	6	1	3
6	(United States) B Fratangelo	3	6	6

Second round
1/WC	(United States) D Kudla	6	6
WC	(United States) B Baker	3	3
(France) Q Halys	6^{3}	6^{3}
Q	(Chile) N Jarry	7^{7}	7^{7}
(United States) F Tiafoe	6	6
Q	(Argentina) T Lipovšek Puches	4	4
(Switzerland) H Laaksonen	6^{2}	5
6	(United States) B Fratangelo	7^{7}	7

Quarterfinals
1/WC	(United States) D Kudla	7^{7}	6
Q	(Chile) N Jarry	6^{4}	3
(United States) F Tiafoe	6	5	2
6	(United States) B Fratangelo	3	7	6

Semifinals
1/WC	(United States) D Kudla	2	2
6	(United States) B Fratangelo	6	6

=== Bottom half ===
First round
8	(United States) J Donaldson	6	7^{7}
(United States) R Harrison	2	6^{5}
(Argentina) G Andreozzi	6	6
(Dominican Republic) J Hernández	4	3
(United Kingdom) J Ward	6	2	3
WC	(United States) T Sandgren	3	6	6
Q	(Russia) R Safiullin	1	5
4	(Austria) G Melzer	6	7
7	(Argentina) F Argüello	7^{7}	6
LL	(Czech Republic) Robin Staněk	6^{4}	3
(Argentina) N Kicker	6	7
(France) A Michon	3	5
(Russia) D Medvedev	7^{9}	7^{7}
(United States) M Krueger	6^{7}	6^{1}
(United States) N Rubin	5	6^{3}
2	(United States) D Young	7	7^{7}

Second round
8	(United States) J Donaldson	1	7	7^{7}
(Argentina) G Andreozzi	6	5	6^{1}
WC	(United States) T Sandgren	0	4
4	(Austria) G Melzer	6	6
7	(Argentina) F Argüello	4	3
(Argentina) N Kicker	6	6
(Russia) D Medvedev	1^{d}
2	(United States) D Young	4

Quarterfinals
8	(United States) J Donaldson	6	6^{2}	6
4	(Austria) G Melzer	4	7^{7}	4
(Argentina) N Kicker	4	5
2	(United States) D Young	6	7

Semifinals
8	(United States) J Donaldson	6	6
2	(United States) D Young	4	3
