= 2010 Tail Savannah Challenger – Singles =

Singles
- 2010 Tail Savannah Challenger

Final
- Champion: (Japan) Kei Nishikori
- Runner-up: (United States) Ryan Sweeting
- Score: 6–4, 6–0

Events
Singles	Doubles
- Tail Savannah Challenger

Michael Russell was the defending champion, but chose to compete in Belgrade instead.
Kei Nishikori won in the final 6–4, 6–0, against Ryan Sweeting.

== Seeds ==
1. (United States) Taylor Dent (first round)
2. (United States) ~~Jesse Levine~~ (withdrew due to dental surgery)
3. (Argentina) Brian Dabul (first round)
4. (United States) Ryan Sweeting (final)
5. (United States) Michael Yani (second round)
6. (United States) Donald Young (semifinals)
7. (United States) Alex Kuznetsov (second round)
8. (United States) Robert Kendrick (quarterfinals)

== Draw ==
Key

- Q = Qualifier
- WC = Wild card
- LL = Lucky loser
- Alt = Alternate
- ITF = ITF entry
- PR = Protected ranking
- SR = Special ranking
- SE = Special exempt
- JE = Junior exempt
- JR = Junior Accelerator Programme entrant
- CO = College Accelerator Programme entrant
- NG = Next Gen Accelerator Program entrant
- w/o = Walkover
- r = Retired
- d = Defaulted

=== Finals ===
Semifinals
(Australia) Joseph Sirianni	1	1
PR	(Japan) Kei Nishikori	6	6
4	(United States) Ryan Sweeting	6	6
6	(United States) Donald Young	4	1

Final
PR	(Japan) Kei Nishikori	6	6
4	(United States) Ryan Sweeting	4	0

=== Top half ===
First round
1	(United States) T Dent	6	3	2
(Australia) J Sirianni	4	6	6
(New Zealand) J Statham	6	6
Q	(United States) N Monroe	3	4
(Chile) P Capdeville	6	6
(United States) J Witten	3	1
WC	(United States) J-M Gambill	2	2
7	(United States) A Kuznetsov	6	6
3	(Argentina) B Dabul	3	1
(United Kingdom) J Ward	6	6
Q	(Philippines) C Mamiit	4	3
PR	(Japan) K Nishikori	6	6
(Canada) V Pospisil	6	1	2
(Australia) G Jones	4	6	6
(Slovakia) I Klec	2	4
8	(United States) R Kendrick	6	6

Second round
(Australia) J Sirianni	7	6
(New Zealand) J Statham	6^{5}	3
(Chile) P Capdeville	4	6	6
7	(United States) A Kuznetsov	6	4	1
(United Kingdom) J Ward	7	1	4
PR	(Japan) K Nishikori	6^{0}	6	6
(Australia) G Jones	1	6	1
8	(United States) R Kendrick	6	2	6

Quarterfinals
(Australia) J Sirianni	6
(Chile) P Capdeville	5	r
PR	(Japan) K Nishikori	6	6
8	(United States) R Kendrick	2	1

Semifinals
(Australia) J Sirianni	1	1
PR	(Japan) K Nishikori	6	6

=== Bottom half ===
First round
5	(United States) M Yani	6	6
(United States) L Cook	4	1
Q	(Slovenia) L Gregorc	3	7	6
Q	(United States) R Borvanov	6	5	3
WC	(United States) D Kosakowski	6	4	0
PR	(United States) B Reynolds	4	6	6
(United Kingdom) J Baker	2	4
4	(United States) R Sweeting	6	6
6	(United States) D Young	6	6
WC	(United States) G Ouellette	1	2
WC	(South Africa) F Wolmarans	6^{5}	3
(United States) R DeHeart	7	6
PR	(Germany) A Satschko	2	4
(Romania) C Gârd	6	6
(United States) T Smyczek	6	6
LL	(Australia) K Hensel	4	4

Second round
5	(United States) M Yani	5	2
Q	(Slovenia) L Gregorc	7	6
PR	(United States) B Reynolds	3	6^{7}
4	(United States) R Sweeting	6	7
6	(United States) D Young	6	6
(United States) R DeHeart	2	3
(Romania) C Gârd	6	3	6
(United States) T Smyczek	2	6	3

Quarterfinals
Q	(Slovenia) L Gregorc	0	6	5
4	(United States) R Sweeting	6	3	7
6	(United States) D Young	6	6
(Romania) C Gârd	1	2

Semifinals
4	(United States) R Sweeting	6	6
6	(United States) D Young	4	1
