= 2023 Savannah Challenger – Doubles =

Doubles
- 2023 Savannah Challenger

Final
- Champions: (United States) William Blumberg (Venezuela) Luis David Martínez
- Runners-up: (Argentina) Federico Agustín Gómez (Argentina) Nicolás Kicker
- Score: 6–1, 6–4

Events
Singles	Doubles
- Savannah Challenger

Ruben Gonzales and Treat Huey were the defending champions but chose not to defend their title.

William Blumberg and Luis David Martínez won the title after defeating Federico Agustín Gómez and Nicolás Kicker 6–1, 6–4 in the final.

== Seeds ==
1. (United States) William Blumberg / (Venezuela) Luis David Martínez (champions)
2. (Mexico) Hans Hach Verdugo / (United States) Christian Harrison (quarterfinals)
3. (Northern Mariana Islands) Colin Sinclair / (New Zealand) Rubin Statham (first round)
4. (United Kingdom) Joshua Paris / (Germany) Tim Sandkaulen (first round)

== Draw ==
Key

- Q = Qualifier
- WC = Wild card
- LL = Lucky loser
- Alt = Alternate
- ITF = ITF entry
- PR = Protected ranking
- SR = Special ranking
- SE = Special exempt
- JE = Junior exempt
- JR = Junior Accelerator Programme entrant
- CO = College Accelerator Programme entrant
- NG = Next Gen Accelerator Program entrant
- w/o = Walkover
- r = Retired
- d = Defaulted

First round
1	(United States) W Blumberg (Venezuela) LD Martínez	6	6
(United States) G Nanda (United States) E Zhu	4	2
(Tunisia) A Dougaz (Germany) Elmar Ejupovic	6	7^{7}
WC	(United States) Jack Vance (United States) Jamie Vance	2	6^{1}
4	(United Kingdom) J Paris (Germany) T Sandkaulen	4	6	[5]
(Argentina) MF Descotte (Australia) B Tomic	6	2	[10]
(France) K Jacquet (France) M Martineau	1	6	[5]
(United States) Tristan McCormick (Canada) B Sigouin	6	4	[10]
(Tunisia) M Echargui (France) C Hemery	3	4
(United States) M Damm (United States) A Rybakov	6	6
(United States) S Bangoura (United States) E King	6	6
3	(Northern Mariana Islands) C Sinclair (New Zealand) R Statham	3	2
Alt	(Argentina) FA Gómez (Argentina) N Kicker	6	6
(United States) N Chappell (United States) Nathan Ponwith	4	2
WC	(United States) U Blanch (United States) V Kirkov	3	2
2	(Mexico) H Hach Verdugo (United States) C Harrison	6	6

Quarterfinals
1	(United States) W Blumberg (Venezuela) LD Martínez	6	7^{7}
(Tunisia) A Dougaz (Germany) E Ejupovic	2	6^{5}
(Argentina) MF Descotte (Australia) B Tomic	6	6
(United States) T McCormick (Canada) B Sigouin	1	2
(United States) M Damm (United States) A Rybakov	6	3	[10]
(United States) S Bangoura (United States) E King	3	6	[12]
Alt	(Argentina) FA Gómez (Argentina) N Kicker	7	6^{10}	[10]
2	(Mexico) H Hach Verdugo (United States) C Harrison	5	7^{12}	[5]

Semifinals
1	(United States) W Blumberg (Venezuela) LD Martínez	6	6
(Argentina) MF Descotte (Australia) B Tomic	4	3
(United States) S Bangoura (United States) E King	7^{7}	3	[2]
Alt	(Argentina) FA Gómez (Argentina) N Kicker	6^{1}	6	[10]

Final
1	(United States) W Blumberg (Venezuela) LD Martínez	6	6
Alt	(Argentina) FA Gómez (Argentina) N Kicker	1	4
