= 2010 Tail Savannah Challenger =

- Date: May 3–9, 2010
- Edition: 2nd
- Location: Savannah, Georgia, United States

Champions

Singles
- (Japan) Kei Nishikori

Doubles
- (United Kingdom) Jamie Baker / (United Kingdom) James Ward
- Tail Savannah Challenger

The 2010 Tail Savannah Challenger was a professional tennis tournament played on outdoor green clay courts. It was part of the 2010 ATP Challenger Tour. It took place in Savannah, United States between May 3 and May 9, 2010.

== Entrants ==
=== Seeds ===
Nationality	Player	Ranking*	Seeding
USA	Taylor Dent	105	1
USA	~~Jesse Levine~~	~~110~~	~~2~~
ARG	Brian Dabul	121	3
USA	Ryan Sweeting	135	4
USA	Michael Yani	147	5
USA	Donald Young	155	6
USA	Alex Kuznetsov	158	7
USA	Robert Kendrick	160	8

- Rankings are as of April 26, 2010.

=== Other entrants ===
The following players received wildcards into the singles main draw:

- (United States) Jan-Michael Gambill
- (United States) Daniel Kosakowski
- (United States) Greg Ouellette
- (South Africa) Fritz Wolmarans

The following players received entry from the qualifying draw:

- (United States) Roman Borvanov
- (Slovenia) Luka Gregorc
- (Philippines) Cecil Mamiit
- (United States) Nicholas Monroe

The following player received entry with protected ranking:

- (Japan) Kei Nishikori

The following player received the lucky loser spot:

- (Australia) Kaden Hensel

== Champions ==
=== Singles ===
(Japan) Kei Nishikori def. (United States) Ryan Sweeting, 6–4, 6–0

=== Doubles ===
(United Kingdom) Jamie Baker / (United Kingdom) James Ward def. (United States) Bobby Reynolds / (South Africa) Fritz Wolmarans, 6–3, 6–4
