= 2018 Savannah Challenger – Doubles =

Doubles
- 2018 Savannah Challenger

Final
- Champions: (United Kingdom) Luke Bambridge (Australia) Akira Santillan
- Runners-up: (Spain) Enrique López Pérez (India) Jeevan Nedunchezhiyan
- Score: 6–2, 6–2

Events
| Singles | Doubles |
- Savannah Challenger

Peter Polansky and Neal Skupski were the defending champions but chose not to defend their title.

Luke Bambridge and Akira Santillan won the title after defeating Enrique López Pérez and Jeevan Nedunchezhiyan 6–2, 6–2 in the final.

== Seeds ==
1. (United States) Evan King / (United States) Nathan Pasha (first round)
2. (Australia) Marc Polmans / (Australia) Max Purcell (quarterfinals)
3. (Spain) Enrique López Pérez / (India) Jeevan Nedunchezhiyan (final)
4. (United States) Nathaniel Lammons / (United States) Alex Lawson (first round)

== Draw ==
Key

- Q = Qualifier
- WC = Wild card
- LL = Lucky loser
- Alt = Alternate
- ITF = ITF entry
- PR = Protected ranking
- SR = Special ranking
- SE = Special exempt
- JE = Junior exempt
- JR = Junior Accelerator Programme entrant
- CO = College Accelerator Programme entrant
- NG = Next Gen Accelerator Program entrant
- w/o = Walkover
- r = Retired
- d = Defaulted

First round
1 | (United States) E King (United States) N Pasha | 6 | 1 | [8]
WC | (United States) JA Ore (United States) A Reed | 3 | 6 | [10]
(United States) H Johnson (United States) Y Johnson | 7^{8} | 6
Q | (Republic of Ireland) J Bradley (United States) Isaiah Strode | 6^{6} | 2
3 | (Spain) E López Pérez (India) J Nedunchezhiyan | 3 | 6 | [10]
(United States) N Chappell (United States) Miles Seemann | 6 | 3 | [4]
(United States) R Galloway (Sweden) A Siljeström | 7^{7} | 7^{7}
(United States) M Krueger (United States) H Reese | 6^{4} | 6^{1}
(Brazil) K Sell (Brazil) JP Sorgi | 6 | 6^{5} | [9]
(Canada) F Dancevic (Italy) Francesco Ferrari | 1 | 7^{7} | [11]
(United Kingdom) L Bambridge (Australia) A Santillan | 7 | 6
4 | (United States) N Lammons (United States) A Lawson | 5 | 3
WC | (United States) Mi Redlicki (United States) Alexandre Rotsaert | 1 | 6 | [10]
(Uruguay) M Cuevas (Bolivia) H Dellien | 6 | 4 | [12]
WC | (United States) S Riffice (United States) A Ritschard | 4 | 4
2 | (Australia) M Polmans (Australia) M Purcell | 6 | 6

Quarterfinals
WC | (United States) JA Ore (United States) A Reed | 5 | 6^{6}
(United States) H Johnson (United States) Y Johnson | 7 | 7^{8}
3 | (Spain) E López Pérez (India) J Nedunchezhiyan | 2 | 6 | [10]
(United States) R Galloway (Sweden) A Siljeström | 6 | 4 | [5]
(Canada) F Dancevic (Italy) F Ferrari | 1 | 2
(United Kingdom) L Bambridge (Australia) A Santillan | 6 | 6
(Uruguay) M Cuevas (Bolivia) H Dellien | 3 | 6 | [10]
2 | (Australia) M Polmans (Australia) M Purcell | 6 | 4 | [7]

Semifinals
(United States) H Johnson (United States) Y Johnson | 4 | 2
3 | (Spain) E López Pérez (India) J Nedunchezhiyan | 6 | 6
(United Kingdom) L Bambridge (Australia) A Santillan | 6 | 1 | [10]
(Uruguay) M Cuevas (Bolivia) H Dellien | 4 | 6 | [7]

Final
3 | (Spain) E López Pérez (India) J Nedunchezhiyan | 2 | 2
(United Kingdom) L Bambridge (Australia) A Santillan | 6 | 6
