= 2016 Savannah Challenger – Doubles =

Doubles
- 2016 Savannah Challenger

Final
- Champion: (United States) Brian Baker; (United States) Ryan Harrison
- Runner-up: (India) Purav Raja; (India) Divij Sharan
- Score: 5–7, 7–6^{(7–4)}, [10–8]

Events
Singles	Doubles
- Savannah Challenger

Guillermo Durán and Horacio Zeballos were the defending champions but chose not to participate.

Brian Baker and Ryan Harrison won the title, defeating Purav Raja and Divij Sharan 5–7, 7–6^{(7–4)}, [10–8] in the final.

== Seeds ==
1. (United States) Dennis Novikov / (Chile) Julio Peralta (quarterfinals)
2. (South Africa) Dean O'Brien / (United States) Donald Young (first round)
3. (India) Purav Raja / (India) Divij Sharan (final)
4. (United States) Sekou Bangoura / (United Kingdom) Darren Walsh (quarterfinals)

== Draw ==
Key

- Q = Qualifier
- WC = Wild card
- LL = Lucky loser
- Alt = Alternate
- ITF = ITF entry
- PR = Protected ranking
- SR = Special ranking
- SE = Special exempt
- JE = Junior exempt
- JR = Junior Accelerator Programme entrant
- CO = College Accelerator Programme entrant
- NG = Next Gen Accelerator Program entrant
- w/o = Walkover
- r = Retired
- d = Defaulted

First round

Quarterfinals

Semifinals

Final

1
- (United States) D Novikov
- (Chile) J Peralta
7
6

- (Georgia (country)) N Basilashvili
- (Venezuela) LD Martínez
5
1

1
- (United States) D Novikov
- (Chile) J Peralta
5
3

- (France) Q Halys
- (France) C Hemery
6
7^{7}

- (France) Q Halys
- (France) C Hemery
7
6

- (Argentina) F Argüello
- (Argentina) T Lipovšek Puches
3
6^{1}

- (France) Q Halys
- (France) C Hemery
2
2

4
- (United States) S Bangoura
- (United Kingdom) D Walsh
7^{10}
6

WC
- (United States) B Baker
- (United States) R Harrison
6
6

WC
- (United States) M Krueger
- (Russia) D Medvedev
6^{8}
4

4
- (United States) S Bangoura
- (United Kingdom) D Walsh
2
5

Q
(Chile) MT Barrios Vera
(Chile) Jorge Montero
4
5

WC
- (United States) B Baker
- (United States) R Harrison
6
7

WC
- (United States) B Baker
- (United States) R Harrison
6
7

WC
- (United States) B Baker
- (United States) R Harrison
5
7^{7}
[10]

WC
(United States) Robert Loeb
(United States) Sean Sculley
2
0

3
- (India) P Raja
- (India) D Sharan
7
6^{4}
[8]

LL
- (Dominican Republic) J Hernández
- (Chile) N Jarrry
6
6

LL
- (Dominican Republic) J Hernández
- (Chile) N Jarrry
3
5

- (Argentina) G Andreozzi
- (Argentina) N Kicker
4
1

3
- (India) P Raja
- (India) D Sharan
6
7

3
- (India) P Raja
- (India) D Sharan
6
6

3
- (India) P Raja
- (India) D Sharan
4
7^{7}
[11]

- (United States) Connor Smith
- (United States) F Tiafoe
2
0

- (Ecuador) G Lapentti
- (Venezuela) R Maytín
6
6^{3}
[9]

- (Ecuador) G Lapentti
- (Venezuela) R Maytín
6
6

- (Ecuador) G Lapentti
- (Venezuela) R Maytín
6
6

- (Austria) G Melzer
- (South Africa) R Roelofse
6
7

- (Austria) G Melzer
- (South Africa) R Roelofse
4
1

2
- (South Africa) D O'Brien
- (United States) D Young
2
5
