= 2016 Savannah Challenger =

- Date: 18 – 24 April
- Edition: 8th
- Draw: 32S / 16D
- Prize money: $50,000
- Surface: Green clay
- Location: Savannah, Georgia, United States

Champions

Singles
- (United States) Bjorn Fratangelo

Doubles
- (United States) Brian Baker / (United States) Ryan Harrison
- Savannah Challenger

The 2016 Savannah Challenger was a professional tennis tournament played on clay courts. It was the seventh edition of the tournament which was part of the 2016 ATP Challenger Tour. It took place in Savannah, Georgia, United States between April 18 and April 24, 2016.

== Singles main-draw entrants ==
=== Seeds ===
Country	Player	Rank	Seed
USA	Denis Kudla	59	1
USA	Donald Young	83	2
USA	Tim Smyczek	117	3
AUT	Gerald Melzer	122	4
GEO	Nikoloz Basilashvili	126	5
USA	Bjorn Fratangelo	128	6
ARG	Facundo Argüello	143	7
USA	Jared Donaldson	144	8

=== Other entrants ===
The following players received wildcards into the singles main draw:

- (United States) Denis Kudla
- (United States) Brian Baker
- (United States) Tommy Paul
- (United States) Tennys Sandgren

The following players received entry from the qualifying draw:

- (Canada) Peter Polansky
- (Chile) Nicolás Jarry
- (Argentina) Tomás Lipovšek Puches
- (Russia) Roman Safiullin

The following players entered as a lucky loser:

- (Czech Republic) Robin Staněk

== Champions ==
=== Singles ===
- (United States) Bjorn Fratangelo def. (United States) Jared Donaldson, 6–1, 6–3

=== Doubles ===
- (United States) Brian Baker / (United States) Ryan Harrison def. (India) Purav Raja / (India) Divij Sharan, 5–7, 7–6^{(7–4)}, [10–8]
