= 2010 Tail Savannah Challenger – Doubles =

Doubles
- 2010 Tail Savannah Challenger

Final
- Champions: (United Kingdom) Jamie Baker (United Kingdom) James Ward
- Runners-up: (United States) Bobby Reynolds (South Africa) Fritz Wolmarans
- Score: 6–3, 6–4

Events
Singles	Doubles
- Tail Savannah Challenger

Carsten Ball and Travis Rettenmaier were the defending champions. Ball chose not to compete this year and Rettenmaier chose to compete in Belgrade instead.
Jamie Baker and James Ward won in the final 6–3, 6–4, against Bobby Reynolds and Fritz Wolmarans.

== Seeds ==
1. (Philippines) Treat Conrad Huey / (India) Harsh Mankad (semifinals)
2. (Australia) Kaden Hensel / (Australia) Adam Hubble (first round)
3. (Canada) Vasek Pospisil / (Sweden) Andreas Siljeström (first round)
4. (Australia) Joseph Sirianni / (Brazil) Márcio Torres (first round)

== Draw ==
Key

- Q = Qualifier
- WC = Wild card
- LL = Lucky loser
- Alt = Alternate
- ITF = ITF entry
- PR = Protected ranking
- SR = Special ranking
- SE = Special exempt
- JE = Junior exempt
- JR = Junior Accelerator Programme entrant
- CO = College Accelerator Programme entrant
- NG = Next Gen Accelerator Program entrant
- w/o = Walkover
- r = Retired
- d = Defaulted

=== Draw ===
First round
1	(Philippines) TC Huey (India) H Mankad	6	6
(United States) L Cook (United States) T Smyczek	1	4
(Chile) P Capdeville (Argentina) B Dabul	4	6	[10]
(Australia) G Jones (New Zealand) J Statham	6	1	[12]
3	(Canada) V Pospisil (Sweden) A Siljeström	3	6^{9}
(United Kingdom) J Baker (United Kingdom) J Ward	6	7
(United States) B Battistone (United States) R DeHeart	4	2
(Slovakia) I Klec (Sweden) M Ryderstedt	6	6
WC	(United States) C Parr (United States) T Paul	6	6
Q	(Mexico) D Garza (United States) E Nunez	1	1
WC	(United States) B Reynolds (South Africa) F Wolmarans	2	7	[10]
4	(Australia) J Sirianni (Brazil) M Torres	6	6^{4}	[4]
(United States) R Kendrick (United States) J Witten	4	3
WC	(United States) T Dent (United States) J-M Gambill	6	6
(United States) A Kuznetsov (United States) R Sweeting	6^{3}	6	[12]
2	(Australia) K Hensel (Australia) A Hubble	7	1	[10]

Quarterfinals
1	(Philippines) TC Huey (India) H Mankad	2	6	[10]
(Australia) G Jones (New Zealand) J Statham	6	4	[7]
(United Kingdom) J Baker (United Kingdom) J Ward	7	6
(Slovakia) I Klec (Sweden) M Ryderstedt	6^{0}	2
WC	(United States) C Parr (United States) T Paul	5	3
WC	(United States) B Reynolds (South Africa) F Wolmarans	7	6
WC	(United States) T Dent (United States) J-M Gambill	3	6	[7]
(United States) A Kuznetsov (United States) R Sweeting	6	3	[10]

Semifinals
1	(Philippines) TC Huey (India) H Mankad	6	6^{5}	[4]
(United Kingdom) J Baker (United Kingdom) J Ward	4	7	[10]
WC	(United States) B Reynolds (South Africa) F Wolmarans	7	6
(United States) A Kuznetsov (United States) R Sweeting	6^{4}	2

Finals
(United Kingdom) J Baker (United Kingdom) J Ward	6	6
WC	(United States) B Reynolds (South Africa) F Wolmarans	3	4
