= 2013 Savannah Challenger =

- Date: 22–28 April 2013
- Edition: 5th
- Draw: 32S / 16D
- Prize money: $50,000
- Surface: Clay, green
- Location: Savannah, United States

Champions

Singles
- (United States) Ryan Harrison

Doubles
- (Russia) Teymuraz Gabashvili / (Ukraine) Denys Molchanov
- Savannah Challenger

The 2013 Savannah Challenger was a professional tennis tournament played on clay courts. It was the fifth edition of the tournament which was part of the 2013 ATP Challenger Tour. It took place in Savannah, Georgia, United States between April 22 and April 28, 2013.

== Singles main draw entrants ==
=== Seeds ===
Country	Player	Rank^{1}	Seed
USA	Mardy Fish	42	1
USA	Michael Russell	88	2
USA	Ryan Harrison	100	3
RUS	Alex Bogomolov Jr.	109	4
USA	Rhyne Williams	117	5
USA	Jack Sock	118	6
USA	Wayne Odesnik	120	7
USA	Tim Smyczek	121	8

- ^{1} Rankings are as of April 15, 2013.

=== Other entrants ===
The following players received wildcards into the singles main draw:

- (United States) Sekou Bangoura
- (United States) Mardy Fish
- (United States) Mitchell Krueger
- (United States) Tennys Sandgren

The following players received entry as a special exempt into the singles main draw:

- (United States) Alex Kuznetsov
- (Ukraine) Denys Molchanov

The following players received entry from the qualifying draw:

- (Japan) Taro Daniel
- (United States) Bjorn Fratangelo
- (Chile) Nicolás Massú
- (Venezuela) Ricardo Rodríguez

The following player received entry as a lucky loser:

- (Georgia (country)) Nikoloz Basilashvili

== Doubles main draw entrants ==
=== Seeds ===
Country	Player	Country	Player	Rank^{1}	Seed
USA	Nicholas Monroe	USA	Jack Sock	175	1
AUS	Carsten Ball	USA	Ryan Harrison	324	2
RUS	Alex Bogomolov Jr.	USA	Bobby Reynolds	354	3
USA	Alex Kuznetsov	GER	Mischa Zverev	357	4

- ^{1} Rankings as of April 15, 2013.

=== Other entrants ===
The following pairs received wildcards into the doubles main draw:

- (United States) Reid Carleton / (United States) Vahid Mirzadeh
- (United States) Bjorn Fratangelo / (United States) Mitchell Krueger
- (United Kingdom) Daniel Regan / (Spain) Georgi Rumenov Payakov

The following pair received entry using a protected ranking:

- (Serbia) Ilija Bozoljac / (India) Somdev Devvarman

The following pairs received entry from the qualifying draw:

- (United Kingdom) David Rice / (United Kingdom) Sean Thornley

== Champions ==
=== Singles ===
- (United States) Ryan Harrison def. (Argentina) Facundo Argüello, 6–2, 6–3

=== Doubles ===
- (Russia) Teymuraz Gabashvili / (Ukraine) Denys Molchanov def. (United States) Michael Russell / (United States) Tim Smyczek, 6–2, 7–5
