= 2018 Savannah Challenger – Singles =

Singles
- 2018 Savannah Challenger

Final
- Champion: (Bolivia) Hugo Dellien
- Runner-up: (United States) Christian Harrison
- Score: 6–1, 1–6, 6–4

Events
| Singles | Doubles |
- Savannah Challenger

Tennys Sandgren was the defending champion but chose not to defend his title.

Hugo Dellien won the title after defeating Christian Harrison 6–1, 1–6, 6–4 in the final.

== Seeds ==
1. (United States) Denis Kudla (first round)
2. (Canada) Peter Polansky (first round)
3. (United States) Donald Young (first round)
4. (Switzerland) Henri Laaksonen (first round)
5. (United States) Michael Mmoh (semifinals)
6. (Slovenia) Blaž Rola (first round)
7. (Bolivia) Hugo Dellien (champion)
8. (United States) Evan King (first round)

== Draw ==
Key

- Q = Qualifier
- WC = Wild card
- LL = Lucky loser
- Alt = Alternate
- ITF = ITF entry
- PR = Protected ranking
- SR = Special ranking
- SE = Special exempt
- JE = Junior exempt
- JR = Junior Accelerator Programme entrant
- CO = College Accelerator Programme entrant
- NG = Next Gen Accelerator Program entrant
- w/o = Walkover
- r = Retired
- d = Defaulted

=== Finals ===
Semifinals
5 | (United States) Michael Mmoh | 6 | 5 | 3
7 | (Bolivia) Hugo Dellien | 1 | 7 | 6
(United States) Reilly Opelka | 5 | 2
(United States) Christian Harrison | 7 | 6

Final
7 | (Bolivia) Hugo Dellien | 6 | 1 | 6
(United States) Christian Harrison | 1 | 6 | 4

=== Top half ===
First round
1 | (United States) D Kudla | 6 | 4 | 4
(Australia) M Purcell | 3 | 6 | 6
(Serbia) M Kecmanović | 4 | 4
Q | (Argentina) F Coria | 6 | 6
WC | (Canada) F Dancevic | 6 | 6
(United States) M Krueger | 4 | 4
SE | (United States) N Rubin | 4 | 6^{6}
5 | (United States) M Mmoh | 6 | 7^{8}
4 | (Switzerland) H Laaksonen | 0 | 4
(Spain) E López Pérez | 6 | 6
(Brazil) G Clezar | 6 | 6
(Germany) D Köpfer | 2 | 3
WC | (United States) S Riffice | 6 | 4 | 2
(Australia) M Polmans | 1 | 6 | 6
(Germany) J Choinski | 6 | 1 | 2
7 | (Bolivia) H Dellien | 2 | 6 | 6

Second round
(Australia) M Purcell | 6 | 6
Q | (Argentina) F Coria | 3 | 2
WC | (Canada) F Dancevic | 4 | 2
5 | (United States) M Mmoh | 6 | 6
(Spain) E López Pérez | 6 | 6^{4} | 4
(Brazil) G Clezar | 0 | 7^{7} | 6
(Australia) M Polmans | 6^{4} | 4
7 | (Bolivia) H Dellien | 7^{7} | 6

Quarterfinals
(Australia) M Purcell | 3 | 2
5 | (United States) M Mmoh | 6 | 6
(Brazil) G Clezar | 7 | 4 | 6^{6}
7 | (Bolivia) H Dellien | 5 | 6 | 7^{8}

Semifinals
5 | (United States) M Mmoh | 6 | 5 | 3
7 | (Bolivia) H Dellien | 1 | 7 | 6

=== Bottom half ===
First round
8 | (United States) E King | 2 | 1
Q | (Brazil) K Sell | 6 | 6
Q | (Uruguay) M Cuevas | 6 | 6
WC | (United States) T Bryde | 1 | 4
(United States) R Opelka | 6 | 6
WC | (United States) S Kirchheimer | 4 | 3
(Chile) C Garín | 6 | 4 | 6
3 | (United States) D Young | 3 | 6 | 1
6 | (Slovenia) B Rola | 6 | 5 | 4
(United States) C Harrison | 2 | 7 | 6
(Australia) A Santillan | 6 | 1 | 6^{3}
(Italy) A Arnaboldi | 3 | 6 | 7^{7}
(United Kingdom) J Clarke | 3 | 6 | 6
Q | (Brazil) JP Sorgi | 6 | 3 | 2
(Brazil) T Bellucci | 6 | 6
2 | (Canada) P Polansky | 3 | 1

Second round
Q | (Brazil) K Sell | 6^{3} | 4
Q | (Uruguay) M Cuevas | 7^{7} | 6
(United States) R Opelka | 6 | 6
(Chile) C Garín | 4 | 4
(United States) C Harrison | 7^{7} | 6
(Italy) A Arnaboldi | 6^{4} | 3
(United Kingdom) J Clarke | 7^{7} | 3 | 3
(Brazil) T Bellucci | 6^{3} | 6 | 6

Quarterfinals
Q | (Uruguay) M Cuevas | 3 | 4
(United States) R Opelka | 6 | 6
(United States) C Harrison | 7 | 6
(Brazil) T Bellucci | 5 | 4

Semifinals
(United States) R Opelka | 5 | 2
(United States) C Harrison | 7 | 6
