= 2023 Savannah Challenger =

- Date: 24 – 30 April
- Edition: 13th
- Surface: Green clay
- Location: Savannah, Georgia, United States

Champions

Singles
- (Argentina) Facundo Díaz Acosta

Doubles
- (United States) William Blumberg / (Venezuela) Luis David Martínez
- Savannah Challenger

The 2023 Savannah Challenger was a professional tennis tournament played on clay courts. It was the 13th edition of the tournament which was part of the 2023 ATP Challenger Tour. It took place in Savannah, Georgia, United States between April 24 and April 30, 2023.

== Singles main-draw entrants ==
=== Seeds ===
Country	Player	Rank^{1}	Seed
BEL	Zizou Bergs	156	1
ARG	Facundo Díaz Acosta	161	2
FRA	Enzo Couacaud	163	3
ARG	Nicolás Kicker	211	4
TUN	Aziz Dougaz	236	5
CAN	Alexis Galarneau	238	6
USA	Mitchell Krueger	270	7
USA	Alex Michelsen	274	8

- ^{1} Rankings are as of April 17, 2023.

=== Other entrants ===
The following players received wildcards into the singles main draw:

- (United States) Martin Damm
- (United States) Toby Kodat
- (United States) Patrick Kypson

The following players received entry into the singles main draw using protected rankings:

- (United States) Bjorn Fratangelo
- (France) ~~Lucas Pouille~~
- (New Zealand) Rubin Statham

The following players received entry into the singles main draw as alternates:

- (United States) Nick Chappell
- (United States) Strong Kirchheimer
- (Australia) Bernard Tomic

The following players received entry from the qualifying draw:

- (Brazil) Mateus Alves
- (United States) Tristan Boyer
- (Argentina) Federico Agustín Gómez
- (France) Kyrian Jacquet
- (United States) Bruno Kuzuhara
- (Northern Mariana Islands) Colin Sinclair

The following player received entry as a lucky loser:

- (Germany) Elmar Ejupovic

== Champions ==
=== Singles ===
- (Argentina) Facundo Díaz Acosta def. (United States) Tristan Boyer 6–3, 6–1.

=== Doubles ===
- (United States) William Blumberg / (Venezuela) Luis David Martínez def. (Argentina) Federico Agustín Gómez / (Argentina) Nicolás Kicker 6–1, 6–4.
