= 2018 Savannah Challenger =

- Date: 30 April – 6 May
- Edition: 10th
- Draw: 32S / 16D
- Surface: Green clay
- Location: Savannah, Georgia, United States

Champions

Singles
- (Bolivia) Hugo Dellien

Doubles
- (United Kingdom) Luke Bambridge / (Australia) Akira Santillan
- Savannah Challenger

The 2018 Savannah Challenger was a professional tennis tournament played on clay courts. It was the tenth edition of the tournament which was part of the 2018 ATP Challenger Tour. It took place in Savannah, Georgia, United States between April 30 and May 6, 2018.

== Singles main-draw entrants ==
=== Seeds ===
Country	Player	Rank	Seed
USA	Denis Kudla	120	1
CAN	Peter Polansky	124	2
USA	Donald Young	130	3
SUI	Henri Laaksonen	135	4
USA	Michael Mmoh	144	5
SLO	Blaž Rola	170	6
BOL	Hugo Dellien	172	7
USA	Evan King	185	8

=== Other entrants ===
The following players received wildcards into the singles main draw:

- (United States) Trent Bryde
- (Canada) Frank Dancevic
- (United States) Strong Kirchheimer
- (United States) Sam Riffice

The following player received entry into the singles main draw as a special exempt:

- (United States) Noah Rubin

The following players received entry from the qualifying draw:

- (Argentina) Federico Coria
- (Uruguay) Martín Cuevas
- (Brazil) Karue Sell
- (Brazil) João Pedro Sorgi

== Champions ==
=== Singles ===
- (Bolivia) Hugo Dellien def. (United States) Christian Harrison 6–1, 1–6, 6–4.

=== Doubles ===
- (United Kingdom) Luke Bambridge / (Australia) Akira Santillan def. (Spain) Enrique López Pérez / (India) Jeevan Nedunchezhiyan 6–2, 6–2.
