= 2017 Savannah Challenger =

- Date: 1 – 7 May
- Edition: 9th
- Draw: 32S / 16D
- Surface: Green clay
- Location: Savannah, Georgia, United States

Champions

Singles
- (United States) Tennys Sandgren

Doubles
- (Canada) Peter Polansky / (United Kingdom) Neal Skupski
- Savannah Challenger

The 2017 Savannah Challenger was a professional tennis tournament played on clay courts. It was the ninth edition of the tournament which was part of the 2017 ATP Challenger Tour. It took place in Savannah, Georgia, United States between May 1 and May 7, 2017.

== Point distribution ==
Event	W	F	SF	QF	Round of 16	Round of 32	Q	Q2
Singles	80	48	29	15	7	0	3	0
Doubles	80	48	29	15	0	—N/a	—N/a	—N/a

== Singles main-draw entrants ==
=== Seeds ===
Country	Player	Rank	Seed
BAR	Darian King	109	1
SUI	Henri Laaksonen	111	2
CAN	Peter Polansky	127	3
ARG	Leonardo Mayer	131	4
USA	Tennys Sandgren	136	5
USA	Stefan Kozlov	147	6
CAN	Denis Shapovalov	178	7
USA	Mitchell Krueger	180	8

=== Other entrants ===
The following players received wildcards into the singles main draw:

- (United States) Marcos Giron
- (United States) Christian Harrison
- (United States) Tommy Paul
- (United States) Ryan Shane

The following player received entry into the singles main draw using a protected ranking:

- (Colombia) Alejandro González

The following players received entry from the qualifying draw:

- (Ecuador) Gonzalo Escobar
- (Latvia) Miķelis Lībietis
- (Croatia) Ante Pavić
- (United States) Wil Spencer

== Champions ==
=== Singles ===
- (United States) Tennys Sandgren def. (Brazil) João Pedro Sorgi 6–4, 6–3.

=== Doubles ===
- (Canada) Peter Polansky / (United Kingdom) Neal Skupski def. (United Kingdom) Luke Bambridge / (United States) Mitchell Krueger 4–6, 6–3, [10–1].
