= 2012 Shanghai Rolex Masters – Singles =

Singles
- 2012 Shanghai Rolex Masters

Final
- Champion: (Serbia) Novak Djokovic
- Runner-up: (United Kingdom) Andy Murray
- Score: 5–7, 7–6^{(13–11)}, 6–3

Events
Singles	Doubles
← 2011 ·	Shanghai Masters	· 2013 →

Novak Djokovic defeated the two-time defending champion Andy Murray in the final, 5–7, 7–6^{(13–11)}, 6–3 to win the singles tennis title at the 2012 Shanghai Masters. Djokovic saved five championship points en route to the title (all in the second set), and ended Murray's perfect 12–0 record at the event. The final was voted as the best ATP World Tour match of the 2012 season.

== Seeds ==
The top eight seeds receive a bye into the second round.

1. (Switzerland) Roger Federer (semifinals)
2. (Serbia) Novak Djokovic (champion)
3. (United Kingdom) Andy Murray (final)
4. (Czech Republic) Tomáš Berdych (semifinals)
5. (France) Jo-Wilfried Tsonga (quarterfinals)
6. (Serbia) Janko Tipsarević (third round)
7. (Argentina) Juan Mónaco (second round)
8. (United States) John Isner (third round)
9. (Spain) Nicolás Almagro (first round)
10. (Croatia) Marin Čilić (quarterfinals)
11. (France) Richard Gasquet (second round)
12. (Canada) Milos Raonic (second round)
13. (Switzerland) Stanislas Wawrinka (third round)
14. (Japan) Kei Nishikori (second round)
15. (France) Gilles Simon (second round)
16. (Germany) Philipp Kohlschreiber (second round)

== Draw ==
=== Key ===
- Q = Qualifier
- WC = Wild card
- LL = Lucky loser
- Alt = Alternate
- SE = Special exempt
- PR = Protected ranking
- ITF = ITF entry
- JE = Junior exempt
- w/o = Walkover
- r = Retired
- d = Defaulted
- SR = Special ranking

=== Finals ===
Quarterfinals
1	(Switzerland) Roger Federer	6	6
10	(Croatia) Marin Čilić	3	4
3	(United Kingdom) Andy Murray	4	6	6
(Czech Republic) Radek Štěpánek	6	2	3
5	(France) Jo-Wilfried Tsonga	3	6^{4}
4	(Czech Republic) Tomáš Berdych	6	7^{7}
(Germany) Tommy Haas	3	3
2	(Serbia) Novak Djokovic	6	6

Semifinals
1	(Switzerland) Roger Federer	4	4
3	(United Kingdom) Andy Murray	6	6
4	(Czech Republic) Tomáš Berdych	3	4
2	(Serbia) Novak Djokovic	6	6

Final
3	(United Kingdom) Andy Murray	7	6^{11}	3
2	(Serbia) Novak Djokovic	5	7^{13}	6

=== Top half ===
==== Section 1 ====
First round
Q	(Chinese Taipei) Y-h Lu	6	6
WC	(China) Z Zhang	0	2
(Uzbekistan) D Istomin	4	6	6
(Argentina) C Berlocq	6	2	1
(Spain) A Ramos	6^{1}	6^{5}
13	(Switzerland) S Wawrinka	7^{7}	7^{7}
10	(Croatia) M Čilić	7	6
Q	(Poland) Ł Kubot	5	3
(Brazil) T Bellucci	3	4
(Slovakia) M Kližan	6	6
(Spain) F Verdasco	6	6
(Japan) G Soeda	2	4

Second round
1	(Switzerland) R Federer	6	7
Q	(Chinese Taipei) Y-h Lu	3	5
(Uzbekistan) D Istomin	4	6	4
13	(Switzerland) S Wawrinka	6	4	6
10	(Croatia) M Čilić	7	6
(Slovakia) M Kližan	5	1
(Spain) F Verdasco	6	6
7	(Argentina) J Mónaco	4	2

Third round
1	(Switzerland) R Federer	4	7^{7}	6
13	(Switzerland) S Wawrinka	6	6^{4}	0
10	(Croatia) M Čilić	4	6	6
(Spain) F Verdasco	6	1	4

Quarterfinals
1	(Switzerland) R Federer	6	6
10	(Croatia) M Čilić	3	4

==== Section 2 ====
First round
(Australia) B Tomic	4	0
(Germany) F Mayer	6	6
(Ukraine) A Dolgopolov	6	6
(France) J Chardy	3	2
(Austria) J Melzer	4	2
15	(France) G Simon	6	6
11	(France) R Gasquet	6	6
Q	(United States) B Baker	2	3
(Czech Republic) R Štěpánek	7	6
WC	(Australia) L Hewitt	5	1
(Finland) J Nieminen	2	6^{4}
(South Africa) K Anderson	6	7^{7}

Second round
3	(United Kingdom) A Murray	w/o
(Germany) F Mayer
(Ukraine) A Dolgopolov	6	6
15	(France) G Simon	3	4
11	(France) R Gasquet	4	4
(Czech Republic) R Štěpánek	6	6
(South Africa) K Anderson	6^{3}	7^{10}	6^{7}
8	(United States) J Isner	7^{7}	6^{8}	7^{9}

Third round
3	(United Kingdom) A Murray	6	6
(Ukraine) A Dolgopolov	2	2
(Czech Republic) R Štěpánek	6	6^{5}	6
8	(United States) J Isner	4	7^{7}	3

Quarterfinals
3	(United Kingdom) A Murray	4	6	6
(Czech Republic) R Štěpánek	6	2	3

=== Bottom half ===
==== Section 3 ====
First round
(France) B Paire	7^{7}	6
Q	(Germany) P Petzschner	6^{2}	4
(Italy) F Fognini	2	2
(Cyprus) M Baghdatis	6	6
Q	(Australia) M Matosevic	6^{4}	3
12	(Canada) M Raonic	7^{7}	6
14	(Japan) K Nishikori	6	6
WC	(China) D Wu	2	4
(United States) S Querrey	6	6
WC	(China) Z Li	3	1
Q	(Germany) M Berrer	2	6^{5}
(Italy) A Seppi	6	7^{7}

Second round
5	(France) J-W Tsonga	7^{9}	7
(France) B Paire	6^{7}	5
(Cyprus) M Baghdatis	7^{7}	6^{5}	7^{7}
12	(Canada) M Raonic	6^{4}	7^{7}	6^{3}
14	(Japan) K Nishikori	6	1	4
(United States) S Querrey	2	6	6
(Italy) A Seppi	3	3
4	(Czech Republic) T Berdych	6	6

Third round
5	(France) J-W Tsonga	6	7^{7}
(Cyprus) M Baghdatis	2	6^{2}
(United States) S Querrey	2	7^{7}	4
4	(Czech Republic) T Berdych	6	6^{3}	6

Quarterfinals
5	(France) J-W Tsonga	3	6^{4}
4	(Czech Republic) T Berdych	6	7^{7}

==== Section 4 ====
First round
(Serbia) V Troicki	6	2	6
(Russia) M Youzhny	3	6	4
Q	(Russia) A Bogomolov Jr.	6^{4}	4
PR	(Spain) T Robredo	7^{7}	6
(Germany) T Haas	4	7^{7}	6
9	(Spain) N Almagro	6	6^{4}	2
16	(Germany) P Kohlschreiber	6	6
(United States) R Harrison	4	4
(Spain) F López	6	1	6
(Colombia) A Falla	3	6	3
(Spain) P Andújar	5	3
(Bulgaria) G Dimitrov	7	6

Second round
6	(Serbia) J Tipsarević	6	7^{7}
(Serbia) V Troicki	2	6^{3}
PR	(Spain) T Robredo	3	3
(Germany) T Haas	6	6
16	(Germany) P Kohlschreiber	3	4
(Spain) F López	6	6
(Bulgaria) G Dimitrov	3	2
2	(Serbia) N Djokovic	6	6

Third round
6	(Serbia) J Tipsarević	2	1
(Germany) T Haas	6	6
(Spain) F López	3	3
2	(Serbia) N Djokovic	6	6

Quarterfinals
(Germany) T Haas	3	3
2	(Serbia) N Djokovic	6	6

== Qualifying ==
=== Seeds ===
1. (Australia) Marinko Matosevic (qualified)
2. (Australia) Matthew Ebden (first round)
3. (United States) Brian Baker (qualified)
4. (Spain) Guillermo García López (qualifying competition)
5. (Chinese Taipei) Lu Yen-hsun (qualified)
6. (Japan) Tatsuma Ito (qualifying competition)
7. (Poland) Łukasz Kubot (qualified)
8. (Slovenia) Grega Žemlja (qualifying competition)
9. (Russia) Alex Bogomolov Jr. (qualified)
10. (Ukraine) Sergiy Stakhovsky (qualifying competition)
11. (Germany) Philipp Petzschner (qualified)
12. (Germany) Michael Berrer (qualified)
13. (Chinese Taipei) Jimmy Wang (qualifying competition)
14. (Thailand) Danai Udomchoke (qualifying competition)

=== Qualifiers ===
1. (Australia) Marinko Matosevic
2. (Germany) Philipp Petzschner
3. (United States) Brian Baker
4. (Russia) Alex Bogomolov Jr.
5. (Chinese Taipei) Lu Yen-hsun
6. (Germany) Michael Berrer
7. (Poland) Łukasz Kubot

=== Draw ===
==== First qualifier ====
First round
1	(Australia) Marinko Matosevic	7	7
Alt	(Philippines) Treat Conrad Huey	5	5
(United States) Donald Young	7^{7}	4	4
10	(Ukraine) Sergiy Stakhovsky	6^{4}	6	6

Qualifying competition
1	(Australia) Marinko Matosevic	6	4	6
10	(Ukraine) Sergiy Stakhovsky	3	6	1

==== Second qualifier ====
First round
2	(Australia) Matthew Ebden	6^{1}	4
(Romania) Marius Copil	7^{7}	6
Alt	(Poland) Mariusz Fyrstenberg	4	4
11	(Germany) Philipp Petzschner	6	6

Qualifying competition
(Romania) Marius Copil	0	6^{3}
11	(Germany) Philipp Petzschner	6	7^{7}

==== Third qualifier ====
First round
3	(United States) Brian Baker	6	6
Alt	(China) Zhang Zhizhen	3	0
(Italy) Gianluca Naso	4	3
8	(Slovenia) Grega Žemlja	6	6

Qualifying competition
3	(United States) Brian Baker	6	7
8	(Slovenia) Grega Žemlja	1	5

==== Fourth qualifier ====
First round
4	(Spain) Guillermo García López	7	6
Alt	(Australia) Peter Luczak	5	2
WC	(China) Li Yu Cheng	0	0
9	(Russia) Alex Bogomolov Jr.	6	6

Qualifying competition
4	(Spain) Guillermo García López	6^{6}	4
9	(Russia) Alex Bogomolov Jr.	7^{8}	6

==== Fifth qualifier ====
First round
5	(Chinese Taipei) Lu Yen-hsun	6	6
Alt	(China) Gao Xin	1	1
Alt	(Croatia) Borut Puc	6^{2}	3
14	(Thailand) Danai Udomchoke	7^{7}	6

Qualifying competition
5	(Chinese Taipei) Lu Yen-hsun	6	6
14	(Thailand) Danai Udomchoke	3	2

==== Sixth qualifier ====
First round
6	(Japan) Tatsuma Ito	6	6
WC	(China) Chang Yu	4	2
(Italy) Riccardo Ghedin	6^{5}	3
12	(Germany) Michael Berrer	7^{7}	6

Qualifying competition
6	(Japan) Tatsuma Ito	6^{3}	1
12	(Germany) Michael Berrer	7	6

==== Seventh qualifier ====
First round
7	(Poland) Łukasz Kubot	7^{7}	6
(China) Gong Mao-Xin	6^{3}	2
(Czech Republic) Jan Hernych	1	2
13	(Chinese Taipei) Jimmy Wang	6	6

Qualifying competition
7	(Poland) Łukasz Kubot	6	6
13	(Chinese Taipei) Jimmy Wang	4	2
