= Jamie Baker (tennis) =

British tennis player (born 1986)

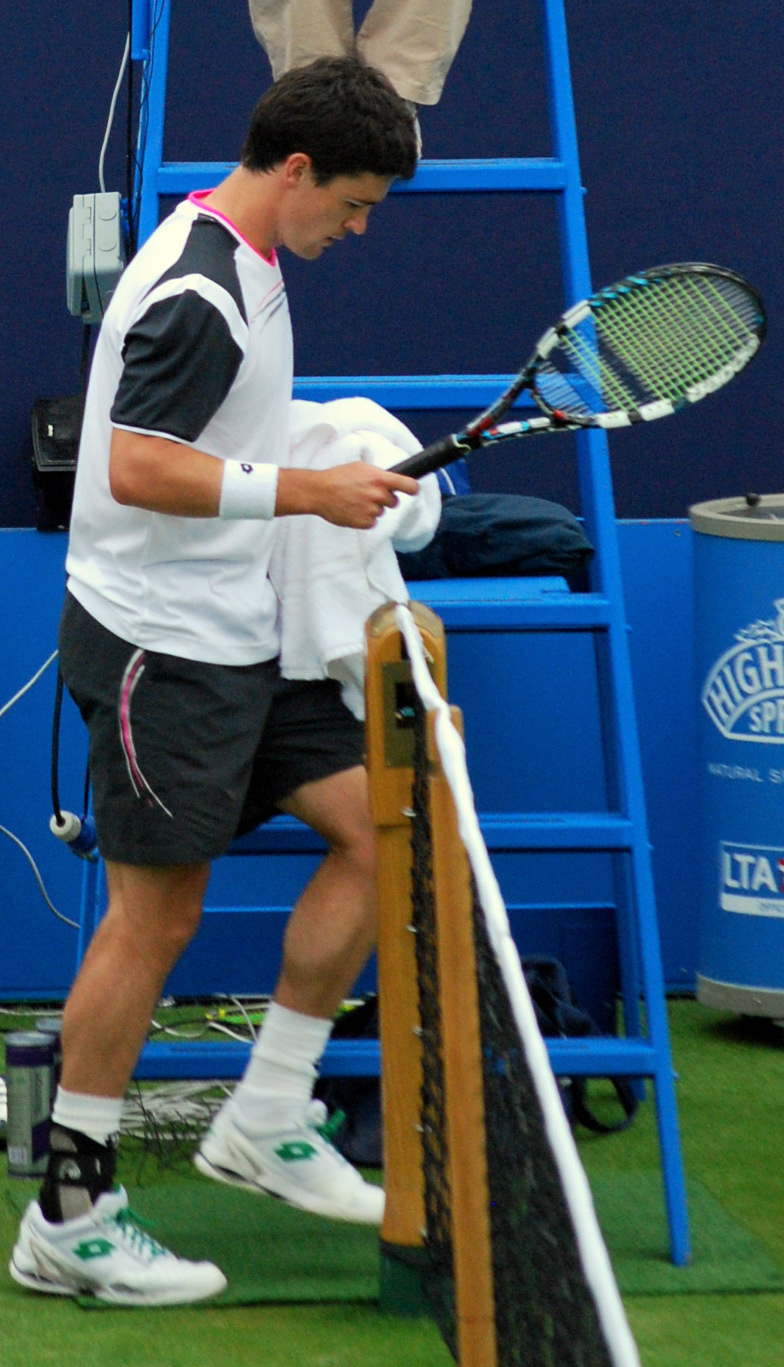
- Country (sports): (United Kingdom) Great Britain
- Residence: Glasgow, Scotland
- Born: 5 August 1986 (age 40) Glasgow, Scotland
- Height: 6 ft 0 in (1.83 m)
- Turned pro: 2004
- Retired: 2013
- Plays: Right-handed (two-handed backhand)
- Coach: Keith Reynolds (2004–2013)
- Prize money: $401,380

Singles
- Career record: 7–20
- Career titles: 0
- Highest ranking: No. 186 (25 June 2012)

Grand Slam singles results
- Australian Open: 1R (2008, 2013)
- French Open: Q2 (2012)
- Wimbledon: 1R (2006, 2007, 2008, 2010, 2012)
- US Open: Q3 (2007)

Doubles
- Career record: 1–3
- Career titles: 0
- Highest ranking: No. 306 (1 November 2010)

Grand Slam doubles results
- Wimbledon: 1R (2007, 2013)

Team competitions
- Davis Cup: 1R (2008)
- Last updated on: 2 July 2021.

Jamie Baker (born 5 August 1986) is a retired British professional male tennis player, who was British No. 2 in 2008.

He won the first match of Leon Smith's tenure as Davis Cup captain, in the tie against Turkey, helping Great Britain to a first Davis Cup win in three years.

Baker has twelve Futures single titles; in doubles, he has 1 Challenger and four Futures titles.

After retiring from tennis, Baker moved into Corporate Finance for a bank, whilst also being a part-time television pundit for Eurosport and the BBC.

Since 2020, he has served as the Head of Professional Tennis and Tournament Director at Wimbledon.

== Early and personal life ==
Baker's parents are Gordon and Lynn, and he has an older brother Steven. Baker first picked up a tennis racket at four, and holidayed at Center Parcs where he and Steven would win adult competitions.

Baker went to junior tournaments all over the UK, and met the Murray brothers. Their mother Judy Murray counselled the Bakers that the best way to progress, would be for Jamie to leave home and move to the LTA Tennis Academy in Loughborough. Lynne and Gordon met host families who might look after their son, but decided they couldn't let Jamie go by himself. Gordon relocated to his company's office in Loughborough, while Lynn stayed in Glasgow. At Loughborough, Baker realised that he was in the second tier of junior players, but he was the only one in his group dedicated enough to compete on the senior tour.

His brother Steven is an international squash player.

== Junior career ==
He had a fairly successful junior career, peaking as high as 6 in the junior ITF rankings. He reached the quarter-finals of junior Wimbledon in 2004, and in the same year won the 18 and under national championships. He won a grade 1 junior event in Venezuela, before turning professional at the age of 18.

== Senior career ==
=== 2005–06 ===
In 2005 Jamie began playing on the futures and challengers tours. His most successful challenger result was a quarter-final at the Burnie Challenger in February 2006. He made his ATP Tour debut by virtue of wild cards at the 2006 Artois Championship and played at the 2006 Wimbledon Championships.

Baker made his debut for the Great Britain Davis Cup team in September 2006 in the crucial relegation play-off against Ukraine. Great Britain won the tie 3–2, although Jamie lost his match, the fifth rubber, 6–3 7–6 against Sergei Bubka.

=== 2007 ===
Baker continued in Challenger tournaments, reaching the final in Waikoloa and making semi finals at places like Lexington and Knowville. He also achieved his first ATP Tour victory, against Alexander Peya, at the 2007 Artois Championships.

He made a second Davis Cup appearance in the World Group Play-off against Croatia on No. 1 Court, Wimbledon in September. With Great Britain leading 4–0, Baker played the dead rubber, losing 6–4 6–4 against Marin Čilić. Britain won the tie 4–1 and qualified for the 2008 World Group. He finished the season ranked as Britain's number 3 player.

In November, he was invited to practise with Pete Sampras at his home.

=== 2008 ===
Baker made a positive start to 2008 by qualifying for the Australian Open. He disposed of 9th seed (Q) Yuri Shukin 6–2 6–0 and then battling past Alexander Peya 6–4 7–6 to reach the final round where he defeated Daniel Köllerer 6–4 6–4. Though he was defeated in the first round by Ivo Karlović, his result of 6–4 6–4 6–7 6–4 was described as highly creditable

Baker later played in his first 'live' Davis Cup rubber in the World Group first round match against Argentina. Though he lost the opener to David Nalbandian (#9), and with Argentina winning 4–0, he gained his first Davis Cup win by beating clay court specialist Agustín Calleri (#41) 7–6, 6–4 in the final tie of the match. When the match finished, the Argentine fans who had been jeering throughout, rose as one to give him a standing ovation. Argentina had won their last ten home encounters 5–0, so Baker prevented the 2006 finalists taking their 11th successive 5–0 victory.

Following the Davis Cup, Jamie won 2 consecutive titles in $15,000 Futures Tournaments in Brownsville, Texas and Harlingen, Texas, becoming 211 in the world and British No 2.

Baker contracted Idiopathic Thrombocytopenic Purpura (ITP) in April, and had to spend three days in intensive care in Florida. Fellow Scot Jamie Murray noted that he was lucky to be alive. Baker had been likely to miss Wimbledon as a result, but was granted a wildcard for the tournament. He lost in the first round 4–6 2–6 3–6 to the Italian Stefano Galvani. ITP was debilitating; unable to train at his previous intensity for more than a year, and with the problem exacerbated by further injuries, Baker's ranking plummeted to 427 by the year's end.

=== 2009 ===
Singles

Baker began the 2009 season playing on the futures tour, but won just twice in his first six tournaments of the year. In July he reached the semi-final of the Gyeongsan event in Korea and in August reached the same stage of two tournaments in Thailand, before winning the event in Nonthaburi, Thailand at the end of the month. In September and October he played four futures events in Australia, winning in two and was runner-up in the others. Following this he returned to the challenger tour, losing his first qualifying match in Charlottesville to Jermaine Jenkins. A week later he qualified for the main draw in Knoxville and won his first round tie against Raven Klaasen before losing to Taylor Dent in the second round. He also reached the second round of the events in Champaign, Illinois and Puebla, Mexico later in November.

Doubles

Baker partnered fellow Briton Chris Eaton at the start of the year, the pair winning the Glasgow futures event. They lost in the first round of their next event. Baker partnered Australian Mark McCook in Korea, but again lost in the first round. In August he resumed his partnership with Eaton and they reached the final of the Great Britain 11 futures event. In his next two doubles events, Baker partnered Australian Dane Propoggia, reaching the final of the first futures event, but losing in the first round of the second. With his move up to the Challenger tour, Baker partnered Australian Nima Roshan in Puebla, reaching the semi-final.

=== 2010 ===
Rather than begin the year in Australia trying to qualify for the Australian Open, Baker chose to play in Futures events in the United Kingdom. He reached the final of the first one, losing to Chris Eaton in Glasgow.

In May, Baker won his only Challenger title, playing doubles with James Ward at the Savannah Challenger.

In July, James Ward beat Baker in the final of the Great Britain F8 Futures in Manchester.

The new Davis Cup Captain Leon Smith selected Baker to take part in Great Britain's vital Davis Cup tie vs Turkey, at Eastbourne, in July alongside James Ward, Ken Skupski, Colin Fleming and Alex Ward(non player). Defeat would have meant Great Britain's relegation to Europe Zone Group III. Baker played his part in the victory by winning both his singles matches, Britain eventually triumphing 5–0, and giving Great Britain a first Davis Cup win in three years.

=== 2011 ===
In March, Leon Smith announced his team for the Euro/Africa Zone Group II tie against Tunisia, but he sprang a surprise, omitting Alex Bogdanovic, having recalled the 26-year-old to the squad after a three-year absence. Instead, Smith's singles players were Ward (No 214) who lost at the first hurdle in six of his seven tournaments this year. and Baker (No 406), who had lost first time out in his last two events. Although Bogdanovic (No 374) had lost all six of his live Davis Cup rubbers, he had at least won a Futures tournament in the United States this year. Baker lost his opening singles match, but won his dead rubber, contributing to Great Britain's 4–1 victory.

=== 2012 ===
In December, Baker spent nearly a month with his close friend Andy Murray at his luxurious winter training base in Miami, along with James Ward, Ross Hutchins and Oliver Golding.

=== 2013 ===
Baker qualified for the main draw of the 2013 Australian Open, beating Donald Young in three sets in the final qualifier. He was defeated by Lukáš Rosol of the Czech Republic in the first round.

In May, Baker decided to retire, but wanted to have one more go by playing on his best surface, grass. There was success in the preliminaries in Nottingham and at Queens, and then for his last match, defeat in the second round of Wimbledon qualifying, against Igor Kunitsyn, a Russian baseliner who had once been in the top 50.

On 29 June Baker announced his retirement from tennis.

== Performance timeline ==
Key
W	F	SF	QF	#R	RR	Q#	P#	DNQ	A	Z#	PO	G	S	B	NMS	NTI	P	NH

(W) winner; (F) finalist; (SF) semifinalist; (QF) quarterfinalist; (#R) rounds 4, 3, 2, 1; (RR) round-robin stage; (Q#) qualification round; (P#) preliminary round; (DNQ) did not qualify; (A) absent; (Z#) Davis/Fed Cup Zonal Group (with number indication) or (PO) play-off; (G) gold, (S) silver or (B) bronze Olympic/Paralympic medal; (NMS) not a Masters tournament; (NTI) not a Tier I tournament; (P) postponed; (NH) not held; (SR) strike rate (events won / competed); (W–L) win–loss record.

=== Singles ===
Tournament	2006	2007	2008	2009	2010	2011	2012	2013	SR	W–L	Win %
Australian Open	A	Q1	1R	A	A	A	A	1R	0 / 2	0–2	0%
French Open	A	A	A	A	A	A	Q2	A	0 / 0	0–0	–
Wimbledon	1R	1R	1R	A	1R	Q2	1R	Q2	0 / 5	0–5	0%
US Open	A	Q3	A	A	Q2	A	A	A	0 / 0	0–0	–
Win–loss	0–1	0–1	0–2	0–0	0–1	0–0	0–1	0–1	0 / 7	0–7	0%
National representation
Davis Cup	Z1	PO	1R	A	Z2	Z2	A	A	0 / 5	4–4	50%
ATP Tour Masters 1000
Indian Wells Masters	A	A	Q1	A	A	A	A	A	0 / 0	0–0	–
Win–loss	0–0	0–0	0–0	0–0	0–0	0–0	0–0	0–0	0 / 0	0–0	–

== ATP Challenger and ITF Futures finals ==
=== Singles: 22 (12–10) ===
Legend ATP Challenger (0–1) ITF Futures (12–9)	Finals by surface Hard (12–9) Clay (0–0) Grass (0–1) Carpet (0–0)

Result	W–L	Date	Tournament	Tier	Surface	Opponent	Score
Win	1–0	May 2005	Mexico F4, Celaya	Futures	Hard	(Brazil) Marcelo Melo	6–3, 5–7, 6–3
Loss	1–1	Jul 2005	USA F19, Godfrey	Futures	Hard	(United States) Sam Warburg	6–7^{(6–8)}, 3–6
Loss	1–2	Oct 2005	Great Britain F13, Edinburgh	Futures	Hard	(United Kingdom) Mark Hilton	3–6, 3–6
Win	2–2	Oct 2005	Great Britain F14, Bolton	Futures	Hard	(Czech Republic) Ladislav Chramosta	6–3, 6–2
Loss	2–3	Feb 2006	Australia F2, Wollongong	Futures	Hard	(Japan) Satoshi Iwabuchi	2–6, 6–7^{(4–7)}
Loss	2–4	Mar 2006	New Zealand F2, Hamilton	Futures	Hard	(Greece) Konstantinos Economidis	4–6, 0–6
Win	3–4	May 2006	Greece F3, Kalamata	Futures	Hard	(United Kingdom) Josh Goodall	6–3, 6–3
Win	4–4	Sep 2006	Great Britain F14, Nottingham	Futures	Hard	(United Kingdom) Jonathan Marray	6–1, 6–1
Loss	4–5	Jan 2007	Waikoloa, United States	Challenger	Hard	(United States) Michael Russell	1–6, 5–7
Win	5–5	Mar 2007	Great Britain F6, Sunderland	Futures	Hard	(France) Gary Lugassy	6–4, 6–7^{(5–7)}, 7–5
Loss	5–6	Sep 2007	Great Britain F18, Nottingham	Futures	Hard	(United Kingdom) Josh Goodall	3–6, 4–6
Win	6–6	Feb 2008	USA F4, Brownsville	Futures	Hard	(South Africa) Kevin Anderson	7–6^{(7–1)}, 6–4
Win	7–6	Mar 2008	USA F5, Harlingen	Futures	Hard	(Australia) Jurek Stasiak	6–2, 7–6^{(7–5)}
Win	8–6	Sep 2009	Thailand F3, Nonthaburi	Futures	Hard	(New Zealand) Daniel King-Turner	6–4, 6–4
Loss	8–7	Sep 2009	Australia F5, Darwin	Futures	Hard	(Australia) Dayne Kelly	4–6, 4–6
Win	9–7	Sep 2009	Australia F6, Darwin	Futures	Hard	(Australia) John Millman	6–4, 2–6, 6–3
Win	10–7	Oct 2009	Australia F7, Happy Valley	Futures	Hard	(Australia) Robert Smeets	6–1, 6–3
Loss	10–8	Oct 2009	Australia F8, Port Pirie	Futures	Hard	(Australia) Matthew Ebden	2–6, 4–6
Loss	10–9	Jan 2010	Great Britain F1, Glasgow	Futures	Hard	(United Kingdom) Chris Eaton	4–6, 4–6
Loss	10–10	Jul 2010	Great Britain F8, Manchester	Futures	Grass	(United Kingdom) James Ward	2–6, 6–7^{(1–7)}
Win	11–10	Aug 2011	Great Britain F12, London	Futures	Hard	(United Kingdom) Edward Corrie	6–1, 4–6, 6–1
Win	12–10	Apr 2012	Mexico F3, Córdoba	Futures	Hard	(United States) Adam El Mihdawy	6–3, 6–2

=== Doubles: 9 (5–4) ===
Legend ATP Challenger (1–2) ITF Futures (4–2)	Finals by surface Hard (4–4) Clay (1–0) Grass (0–0) Carpet (0–0)

Result	W–L	Date	Tournament	Tier	Surface	Partner	Opponents	Score
Win	1–0	Dec 2003	Spain F30, Orense	Futures	Hard	(Romania) Adrian Cruciat	(Spain) Guillem Burniol (Spain) Israel Matos Gil	6–4, 6–4
Win	2–0	Mar 2007	Great Britain F5, Jersey	Futures	Hard	(Pakistan) Aisam Qureshi	(United Kingdom) Ross Hutchins (United Kingdom) Josh Goodall	6–2, 7–6^{(7–2)}
Win	3–0	Mar 2007	Great Britain F6, Sunderland	Futures	Hard	(Pakistan) Aisam Qureshi	(Australia) Sam Groth (Australia) Andrew Coelho	6–3, 3–6, 6–3
Loss	3–1	Nov 2007	Knoxville, United States	Challenger	Hard	(United States) Brendan Evans	(United States) Sam Warburg (Israel) Harel Levy	6–3, 2–6, [6–10]
Win	4–1	Jan 2009	Great Britain F1, Glasgow	Futures	Hard	(United Kingdom) Chris Eaton	(France) Romain Jouan (France) Pierrick Ysern	7–5, 6–0
Loss	4–2	Aug 2009	Great Britain F11, Ottershaw	Futures	Hard	(United Kingdom) Chris Eaton	(United Kingdom) Tim Bradshaw (United Kingdom) Dominic Inglot	6–4, 6–7^{(2–7)}, [3–10]
Loss	4–3	Sep 2009	Australia F5, Darwin	Futures	Hard	(Australia) Dane Propoggia	(Australia) Matthew Ebden (Australia) Sadik Kadir	4–6, 5–7
Win	5–3	May 2010	Savannah, United States	Challenger	Clay	(United Kingdom) James Ward	(United States) Bobby Reynolds (South Africa) Fritz Wolmarans	6–3, 6–4
Loss	5–4	May 2011	Busan, South Korea	Challenger	Hard	(Canada) Vasek Pospisil	(Thailand) Danai Udomchoke (South Korea) Im Kyu-Tae	4–6, 4–6
