= Brian Baker (tennis) =

American tennis player (born 1985)

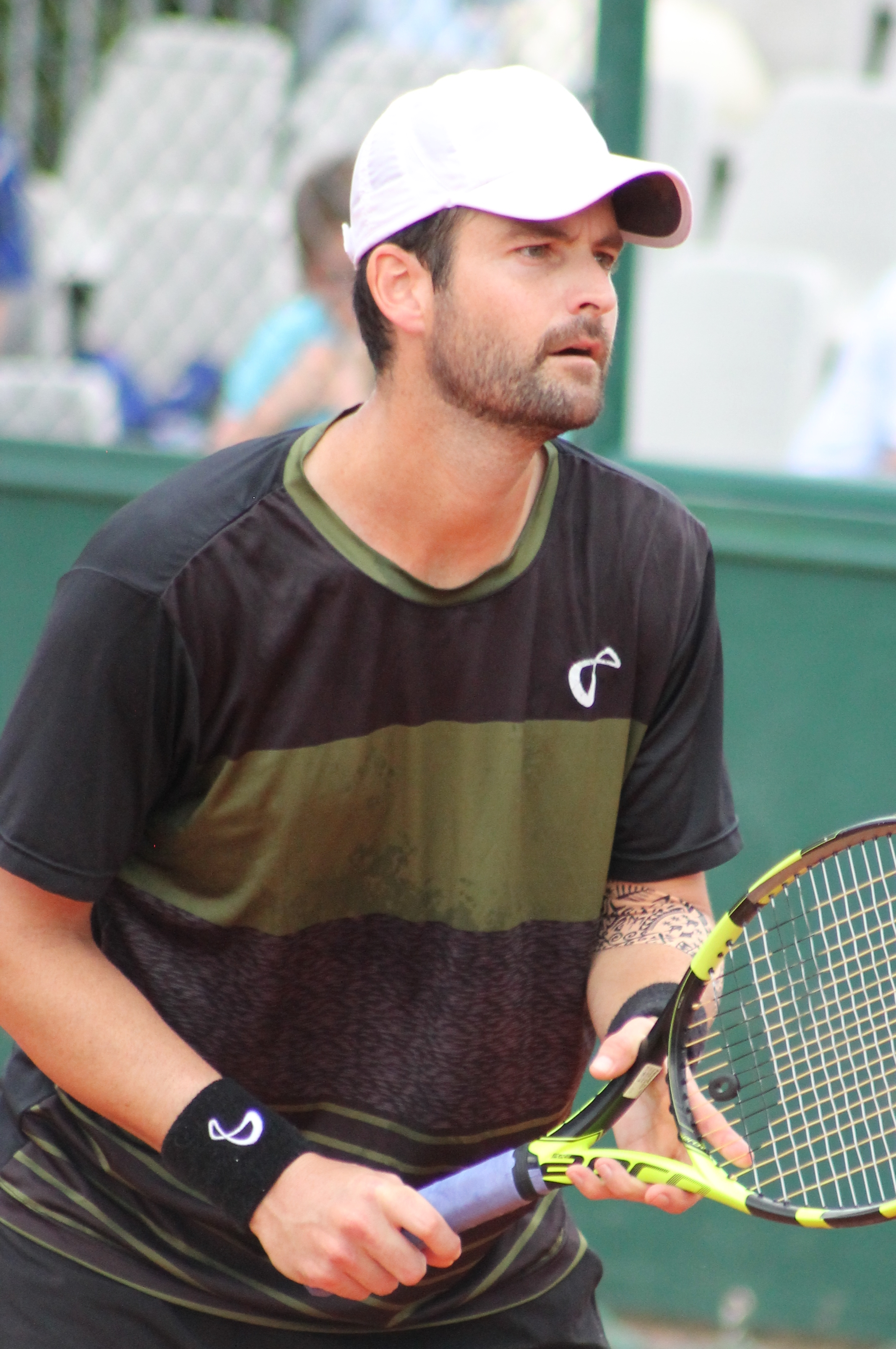
- Baker at the 2016 French Open.
- Country (sports): United States
- Residence: Nashville, Tennessee, U.S.
- Born: April 30, 1985 (age 41) Nashville, Tennessee, U.S.
- Height: 6 ft 3 in (1.91 m)
- Turned pro: 2003
- Retired: 2017
- Plays: Right-handed (two-handed backhand)
- Prize money: US $1,184,653

Singles
- Career record: 20–40
- Career titles: 0
- Highest ranking: No. 52 (October 29, 2012)

Grand Slam singles results
- Australian Open: 2R (2013)
- French Open: 2R (2012)
- Wimbledon: 4R (2012)
- US Open: 2R (2005, 2012)

Other tournaments
- Olympic Games: 1R (2016)

Doubles
- Career record: 35–33
- Career titles: 2
- Highest ranking: No. 29 (May 22, 2017)

Grand Slam doubles results
- Australian Open: 3R (2017)
- French Open: 3R (2016)
- Wimbledon: 1R (2016)
- US Open: 3R (2013, 2016)

Other doubles tournaments
- Olympic Games: 2R (2016)

Brian Richard Baker (born April 30, 1985) is an American former professional tennis player. He was ranked as high as world No. 52 in singles and No. 29 in doubles by the Association of Tennis Professionals (ATP).

== Juniors ==
As a junior player, Baker won the 2002 edition of prestigious Orange Bowl. In 2003, he reached the boys' singles final of the French Open after beating Marcos Baghdatis in the quarterfinals and Jo-Wilfried Tsonga in the semifinals. In the final, he lost to Stan Wawrinka. Baker reached No. 2 in singles and No. 5 in doubles in the junior world rankings.

== Professional career ==
=== Early years ===
Baker's biggest win of his fledgling career occurred in August 2005, when he scored an upset victory over ninth-seeded Gastón Gaudio in the 2005 US Open. The victory was Baker's first Grand Slam win. Baker originally played on the tour for only a short time, from 2002 through 2005, as well as participating in three autumn Challenger events in 2007. He won one Challenger event in singles (and three in doubles) during this time and reached a career-best singles ranking of world No. 172 on November 15, 2004. He was coached by Ricardo Acuña.

In 2007, he was sidelined for nearly six years after five surgeries—three on his hip, one on his elbow, and one sports hernia—and did not play on the tour again until 2011.

=== Return to professional tennis ===
While coaching tennis at Belmont University, Baker began to feel his body gradually improving and decided to try again to make it as a professional tennis player in the summer of 2011. He subsequently entered an ITF Futures tournament in Pittsburgh in July 2011 as an unranked qualifier, qualified, and won the tournament, all without dropping a set. In September, he entered the Canadian Futures 7 and reached the semifinals, again without dropping a set. He lost in a walkover to Jesse Levine. Two months later, in November 2011, Baker entered the 2011 Knoxville Challenger, and qualified for the tournament after straight-set victories over Jordan Cox, Tim Smyczek and Michael McClune. He went on to win his next four matches, before losing to Jesse Levine in the final.

=== 2012 ===
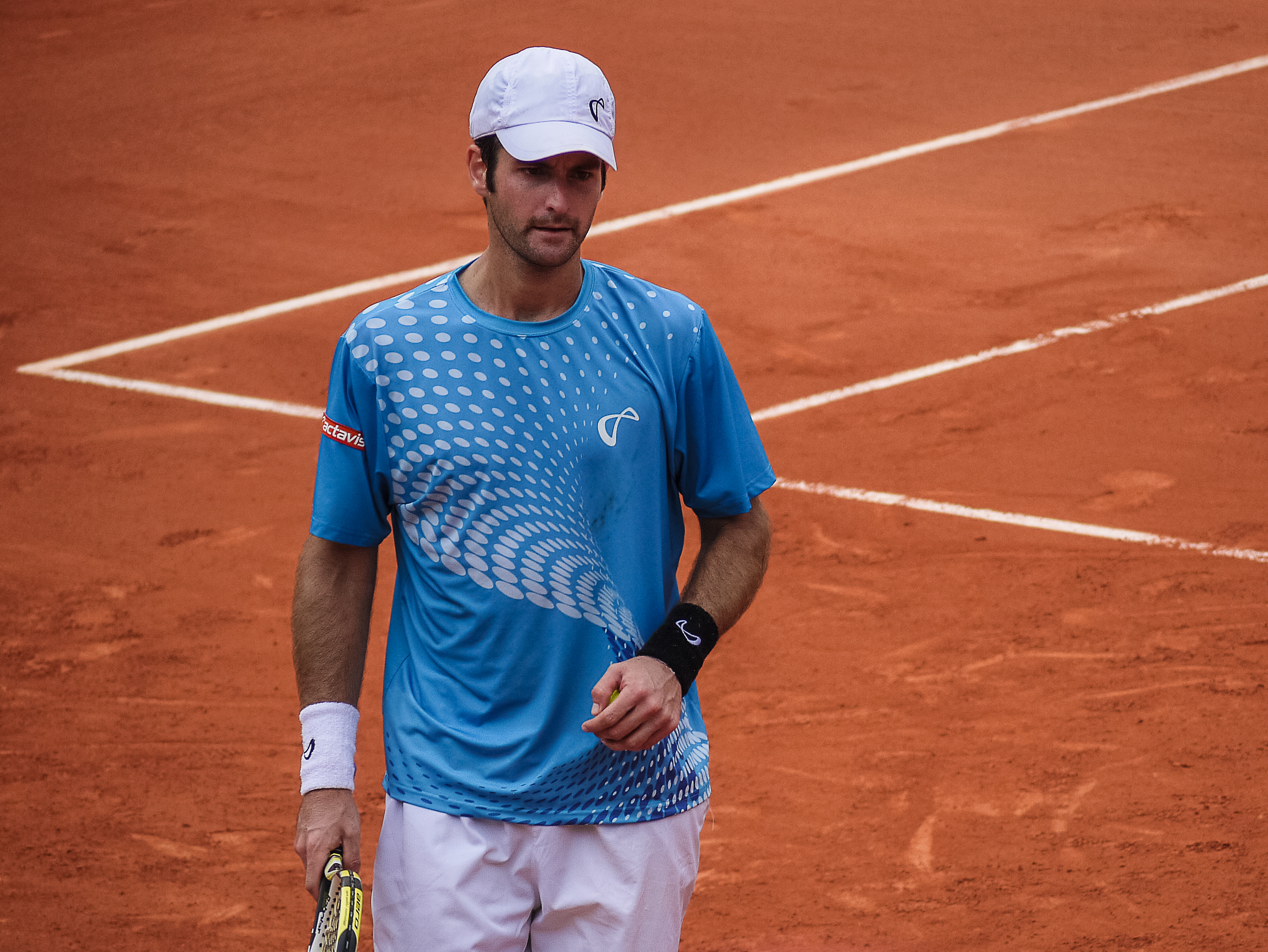
Baker during his second round match at the 2012 French Open.

Baker won three Futures and Challenger tournaments early in 2012 before returning to the ATP Tour: USA F3 and F8, and Sarasota.

After winning the Savannah Challenger, beating Augustin Gensse in the final in April 2012, he was awarded a wild card for the 2012 French Open. In response to this, Baker's good friend Amer Delić noted an inconvenient truth about the situation by tweeting, "Brian Baker... Same guy that USTA refused to give a WC for qualies of the clay court Future last summer..." The statement was in reference to the USA F17 tournament that Baker went on to win.

Shortly before the French Open, he qualified for the 2012 Open de Nice Côte d'Azur in May, beating Ilija Bozoljac, David Guez, and Alejandro González in the qualification rounds, all in straight sets. Baker then faced Sergey Stakhovsky in the first round, losing the first set before recovering to win the match. A straight sets victory against Gaël Monfils meant that Baker progressed to the quarterfinals of the tournament. Hard-fought wins over Mikhail Kukushkin and Nikolay Davydenko took Baker to his first ATP final on a 15-match winning streak going into the match. He ultimately lost to Nicolás Almagro, the repeat champion, in the final. After his surprising performance, he reached his highest singles ranking at No. 141.

Just two days after the final in Nice, Baker headed to Paris for the French Open. He beat Xavier Malisse in straight sets in the first round, before losing to Gilles Simon in the second round in five sets. Despite the defeat, Baker's appearance in the tournament was described as "one of the most remarkable comebacks of modern times."

Two weeks after the French Open, Baker qualified for the 2012 Wimbledon Championships after beating Radu Albot, Denis Gremelmayr, and Maxime Teixeira in the qualification rounds. He secured a straight-set victory over Rui Machado in his first-round match before dismissing Jarkko Nieminen, also in straight sets, to progress to the third round. In his third-round match, he beat Frenchman Benoît Paire in four sets. Baker bowed out of the competition in the fourth round, losing in straight sets to Philipp Kohlschreiber. On his performance at Wimbledon, Baker stated - "It's been an unbelievable run. I don't know if I put an expectation like I need to get to this round or not. But I don't know if starting first round qualifiers I would have thought I would have got to the fourth round of Wimbledon".

After starting the North American hard-court season with a string of four first-round losses to lower-ranked players, Baker pulled off another remarkable upset, gaining revenge by beating world No. 17 (and recent Wimbledon quarterfinalist) Philipp Kohlschreiber in the first round of the Cincinnati Masters. He subsequently lost to Australian Bernard Tomic in the second round. At the 2012 US Open, he matched his best US Open and Grand Slam performance from before his injuries, reaching the second round. He defeated Jan Hájek before falling to eighth seed Janko Tipsarević.

During the indoor hard-court season, Baker qualified (as the top qualifying seed) for the ATP 500 tournament Beijing, losing in the first round to Kevin Anderson. He then qualified for the Shanghai Masters, losing to 11th seed Richard Gasquet in the opening round. After these consecutive first-round losses, Baker pulled off a remarkable comeback by winning against Radek Štěpánek in Basel, after being a set and a double-break down. Baker lost in the second round to eventual champion Juan Martín del Potro.

He ended 2012 ranked world No. 61, after reaching a career-high ranking of world No. 52 in October.

=== 2013 ===
In the Heineken Open in Auckland, Baker upset fifth seed (and recent Paris Masters finalist) Jerzy Janowicz in the first round. He converted 2 out of 17 break points and finally won on his eighth match point.

In the second round of the Australian Open, Baker led 20th seed Sam Querrey 7–6^{(2)}, 1–1 before a knee injury forced him to retire. This was later diagnosed as a torn meniscus, which put Baker off the tour for about four months.

Baker made his return in Aptos. losing to Guido Pella. He then lost to Grigor Dimitrov in the second round of the Cincinnati Masters. At the U.S Open he was defeated by Lleyton Hewitt in the first round.

He ended 2013 ranked world No. 359.

=== 2014 ===
Baker withdrew from the 2014 Australian Open, citing a knee injury.

=== 2015–2017 ===
He was granted a wild card into the main draw of the 2016 Australian Open after a nearly three-year injury layoff.

In August 2016, he lost in the Round of 16 of the Tennis at the 2016 Summer Olympics – Men's doubles partnering with Rajeev Ram. They faced off against the Austrian team of Oliver Marach and Alexander Peya.

In February 2017, he won his maiden ATP Tour title at the Memphis Open in doubles partnering Nikola Mektić. They faced off against compatriots Ryan Harrison and Steve Johnson in the final. He won his second doubles title in Budapest in April, again partnering with Mektić.

=== 2018 ===
Baker underwent his 14th major surgery on December 21, 2018 (back), delaying his comeback.

== Personal life ==
Baker was as an assistant coach for the Belmont University men's tennis program for four years. He studied toward business and finance degrees at the university.

== ATP Tour finals ==
=== Singles: 1 (runner-up) ===
Legend Grand Slam ATP 1000 ATP 500 ATP 250 (0–1)	Finals by surface Hard Clay (0–1) Grass	Finals by setting Outdoor (0–1) Indoor

Result	W–L	Date	Tournament	Tier	Surface	Opponent	Score
Loss	0–1	May 2012	Open de Nice Côte d'Azur, France	ATP 250	Clay	(Spain) Nicolás Almagro	3–6, 2–6

=== Doubles: 2 (2 titles) ===
Legend Grand Slam ATP 1000 ATP 500 ATP 250 (2–0)	Finals by surface Hard (1–0) Clay (1–0) Grass	Finals by setting Outdoor (1–0) Indoor (1–0)

Result	W–L	Date	Tournament	Tier	Surface	Partner	Opponents	Score
Win	1–0	Feb 2017	Memphis Open, US	ATP 250	Hard (i)	(Croatia) Nikola Mektić	(United States) Ryan Harrison (United States) Steve Johnson	6–3, 6–4
Win	2–0	Apr 2017	Hungarian Open, Hungary	ATP 250	Clay	(Croatia) Nikola Mektić	(Colombia) Juan Sebastián Cabal (Colombia) Robert Farah	7–6^{(7–2)}, 6–4

== ATP Challenger and ITF Tour finals ==
=== Singles: 10 (6 titles, 4 runner-ups) ===
Legend ATP Challenger Tour (2–2) ITF Futures (4–2)	Finals by surface Hard (3–3) Clay (3–1)

Result	W–L	Date	Tournament	Tier	Surface	Opponent	Score
Loss	0–1	Apr 2003	Little Rock, US	Futures	Hard	(Argentina) Ignacio Hirigoyen	6–3, 5–7, 3–6
Win	1–1	Jan 2004	Tampa, US	Futures	Hard	(United States) Todd Widom	6–3, 6–4
Loss	1–2	May 2004	Tampa, US	Futures	Hard	(United States) K. J. Hippensteel	6–1, 6–7^{(5–7)}, 2–6
Win	1–0	Aug 2004	Denver, US	Challenger	Hard	(United States) K. J. Hippensteel	7–6^{(7–5)}, 6–4
Loss	1–1	May 2005	Tunica, US	Challenger	Clay	(United States) James Blake	2–6, 3–6
Win	2–2	Jul 2011	Pittsburgh, US	Futures	Clay	(United States) Bjorn Fratangelo	7–5, 6–3
Loss	1–2	Nov 2011	Knoxville, US	Challenger	Hard	(United States) Jesse Levine	2–6, 3–6
Win	3–2	Jan 2012	Weston, US	Futures	Clay	(Australia) Jason Kubler	7–5, 6–3
Win	4–2	Mar 2012	Costa Mesa, US	Futures	Hard	(United States) Greg Ouellette	6–1, 6–2
Win	2–2	Apr 2012	Savannah, US	Challenger	Clay	(France) Augustin Gensse	6–4, 6–3

=== Doubles: 15 (11 titles, 4 runner-ups) ===
Legend ATP Challenger Tour (8–2) ITF Futures (3–2)	Finals by surface Hard (10–4) Clay (1–0)

Result	W–L	Date	Tournament	Tier	Surface	Partner	Opponents	Score
Loss	0–1	Apr 2002	Elkin, US	Futures	Hard	(United States) Rajeev Ram	(United States) Huntley Montgomery (United States) Tripp Phillips	6–2, 4–6, 4–6
Loss	0–2	Nov 2002	Hattiesburg, US	Futures	Hard	(United States) Rajeev Ram	(United States) Huntley Montgomery (United States) Tripp Phillips	3–6, 1–6
Win	1–2	May 2003	Orange Park, US	Futures	Clay	(United States) Phillip Simmonds	(United States) Brendan Evans (South Africa) Marcos Ondruska	4–6, 7–5, 6–4
Win	2–2	Oct 2003	Arlington, US	Futures	Hard	(United States) Bobby Reynolds	(United States) Hamid Mirzadeh (United States) Vahid Mirzadeh	6–2, 6–2
Loss	0–1	Nov 2003	Champaign, US	Challenger	Hard (i)	(United States) Rajeev Ram	(United States) Travis Parrott (Brazil) Bruno Soares	6–4, 4–6, 1–6
Win	3–2	Jan 2004	Tampa, US	Futures	Hard	(United States) Rajeev Ram	(United States) Huntley Montgomery (United States) Tripp Phillips	6–3, 3–6, 6–2
Loss	0–2	Feb 2004	Joplin, US	Challenger	Hard (i)	(United States) Rajeev Ram	(Chinese Taipei) Yen-Hsun Lu (Brazil) Bruno Soares	6–3, 1–6, 1–6
Win	1–2	Jul 2004	Granby, Canada	Challenger	Hard	(Canada) Frank Dancevic	(Canada) Harel Levy (Italy) Davide Sanguinetti	6–2, 7–6^{(7–5)}
Win	2–2	Aug 2004	Denver, US	Challenger	Hard	(United States) Rajeev Ram	(United Kingdom) Jamie Delgado (United Kingdom) Jonathan Marray	6–2, 6–2
Win	3–2	Nov 2004	Champaign, US	Challenger	Hard (i)	(United States) Rajeev Ram	(United States) Justin Gimelstob (United States) Graydon Oliver	7–6^{(7–5)}, 7–6^{(9–7)}
Win	4–2	Apr 2016	Savannah, US	Challenger	Hard (i)	(United States) Ryan Harrison	(India) Purav Raja (India) Divij Sharan	5–7, 7–6^{(7–4)}, [10–8]
Win	5–2	Oct 2016	Stockton, US	Challenger	Hard	(Australia) Sam Groth	(Australia) Matt Reid (Australia) John-Patrick Smith	6–2, 4–6, [10–2]
Win	6–2	Oct 2016	Fairfield, US	Challenger	Hard	(United States) Mackenzie McDonald	(United States) Sekou Bangoura (United States) Eric Quigley	6–3, 6–4
Win	7–2	Oct 2016	Las Vegas, US	Challenger	Hard	(Australia) Matt Reid	(United States) Bjorn Fratangelo (United States) Denis Kudla	6–1, 7–5
Win	8–2	Nov 2016	Charlottesville, US	Challenger	Hard (i)	(Australia) Sam Groth	(United Kingdom) Brydan Klein (South Africa) Ruan Roelofse	6–3, 6–3

== Junior Grand Slam finals ==
=== Singles: 1 (runner-up) ===
Result	Year	Tournament	Surface	Opponent	Score
Loss	2003	French Open	Clay	(Switzerland) Stan Wawrinka	5–7, 6–4, 3–6

=== Doubles: 2 (2 runner-ups) ===
Result	Year	Tournament	Surface	Partner	Opponents	Score
Loss	2002	Wimbledon	Grass	(United States) Rajeev Ram	(Romania) Florin Mergea (Romania) Horia Tecău	4–6, 6–4, 4–6
Loss	2002	US Open	Hard	(Australia) Chris Guccione	(Netherlands) Michel Koning (Netherlands) Bas van der Valk	4–6, 4–6

== Performance timelines ==
Key
W	F	SF	QF	#R	RR	Q#	DNQ	A	NH

(W) winner; (F) finalist; (SF) semifinalist; (QF) quarterfinalist; (#R) rounds 4, 3, 2, 1; (RR) round-robin stage; (Q#) qualification round; (DNQ) did not qualify; (A) absent; (NH) not held; (SR) strike rate (events won / competed); (W–L) win–loss record.

=== Singles ===
Tournament	2001	2002	2003	2004	2005	2006	2007	2008	2009	2010	2011	2012	2013	2014	2015	2016	2017	SR	W–L
Grand Slam tournaments
Australian Open	A	A	A	A	Q1	A	A	A	A	A	A	A	2R	A	A	1R	Q1	0 / 2	1–2
French Open	A	A	A	A	Q1	A	A	A	A	A	A	2R	A	A	A	1R	A	0 / 2	1–2
Wimbledon	A	A	A	A	Q1	A	A	A	A	A	A	4R	A	A	A	1R	A	0 / 2	3–2
US Open	Q1	Q1	1R	1R	2R	A	A	A	A	A	A	2R	1R	A	A	1R	A	0 / 6	2–6
Win–loss	0–0	0–0	0–1	0–1	1–1	0–0	0–0	0–0	0–0	0–0	0–0	5–3	1–2	0–0	0–0	0–4	0–0	0 / 12	7–12
ATP World Tour Masters 1000
Indian Wells Masters	A	A	Q1	A	A	A	A	A	A	A	A	A	A	A	A	A	A	0 / 0	0–0
Miami Open	A	Q1	Q1	1R	A	A	A	A	A	A	A	A	A	A	A	1R	A	0 / 2	0–2
Cincinnati Masters	A	A	A	A	A	A	A	A	A	A	A	2R	2R	A	A	Q2	A	0 / 2	2–2
Shanghai Masters	not held								A	A	A	1R	A	A	A	A	A	0 / 1	0–1
Win–loss	0–0	0–0	0–0	0–1	0–0	0–0	0–0	0–0	0–0	0–0	0–0	1–2	1–1	0–0	0–0	0–1	0–0	0 / 5	2–5
National representation
Summer Olympics	not held			A	not held			A	not held			A	not held			1R	NH	0 / 1	0–1
Career statistics
Tournaments	0	1	3	5	3	0	0	0	0	0	0	13	5	0	0	10	0	40	
Titles / Finals	0 / 0	0 / 0	0 / 0	0 / 0	0 / 0	0 / 0	0 / 0	0 / 0	0 / 0	0 / 0	0 / 0	0 / 1	0 / 0	0 / 0	0 / 0	0 / 0	0 / 0	0 / 1	
Overall win–loss	0–0	0–1	0–3	2–5	2–3	0–0	0–0	0–0	0–0	0–0	0–0	11–13	3–5	0–0	0–0	2–10	0–0	20–40	
Year-end ranking	N/A	614	422	178	205	N/A	842	N/A	N/A	N/A	456	61	359	N/A	N/A	245	1129	33%	

=== Doubles ===
Tournament	2002	2003	2004	2005	2006	2007	2008	2009	2010	2011	2012	2013	2014	2015	2016	2017	SR	W–L
Grand Slam tournaments
Australian Open	A	A	A	A	A	A	A	A	A	A	A	A	A	A	1R	3R	0 / 2	2–2
French Open	A	A	A	A	A	A	A	A	A	A	A	A	A	A	3R	1R	0 / 2	2–2
Wimbledon	A	A	A	A	A	A	A	A	A	A	A	A	A	A	1R	A	0 / 1	0–1
US Open	A	A	2R	1R	A	A	A	A	A	A	2R	3R	A	A	3R	1R	0 / 6	6–6
Win–loss	0–0	0–0	1–1	0–1	0–0	0–0	0–0	0–0	0–0	0–0	1–1	2–1	0–0	0–0	4–4	2–3	0 / 11	10–11
ATP World Tour Masters 1000
Miami Open	1R	A	A	A	A	A	A	A	A	A	A	A	A	A	A	SF	0 / 2	2–2
Madrid Open	A	A	A	A	A	A	A	A	A	A	A	A	A	A	A	2R	0 / 1	1–1
Italian Open	A	A	A	A	A	A	A	A	A	A	A	A	A	A	A	2R	0 / 1	1–1
Cincinnati Masters	A	A	A	A	A	A	A	A	A	A	2R	1R	A	A	2R	A	0 / 3	2–3
Win–loss	0–1	0–0	0–0	0–0	0–0	0–0	0–0	0–0	0–0	0–0	1–1	0–1	0–0	0–0	1–1	4–3	0 / 7	6–7
National representation
Summer Olympics	not held		A	not held			A	not held			A	not held			2R	NH	0 / 1	1–1
Career statistics
Tournaments	1	0	2	1	0	0	0	0	0	0	4	3	0	0	10	14	35	
Titles / Finals	0 / 0	0 / 0	0 / 0	0 / 0	0 / 0	0 / 0	0 / 0	0 / 0	0 / 0	0 / 0	0 / 0	0 / 0	0 / 0	0 / 0	0 / 0	2 / 2	2 / 2	
Overall win–loss	0–1	0–0	1–2	0–1	0–0	0–0	0–0	0–0	0–0	0–0	3–4	2–3	0–0	0–0	8–10	21–12	35–33	
Year-end ranking	776	400	120	487	N/A	1552	N/A	N/A	N/A	N/A	261	346	N/A	N/A	69	43	51%	

== Wins over top-10 players ==
- Baker's match record against players who were, at the time the match was played, ranked in the top 10.

#	Player	Rank	Event	Surface	Rd	Score	BB Rank
2005
1.	(Argentina) Gastón Gaudio	9	US Open, New York, US	Hard	1R	7–6^{(11–9)}, 6–2, 6–4	195
