= Bjorn Fratangelo =

American tennis player (born 1993)

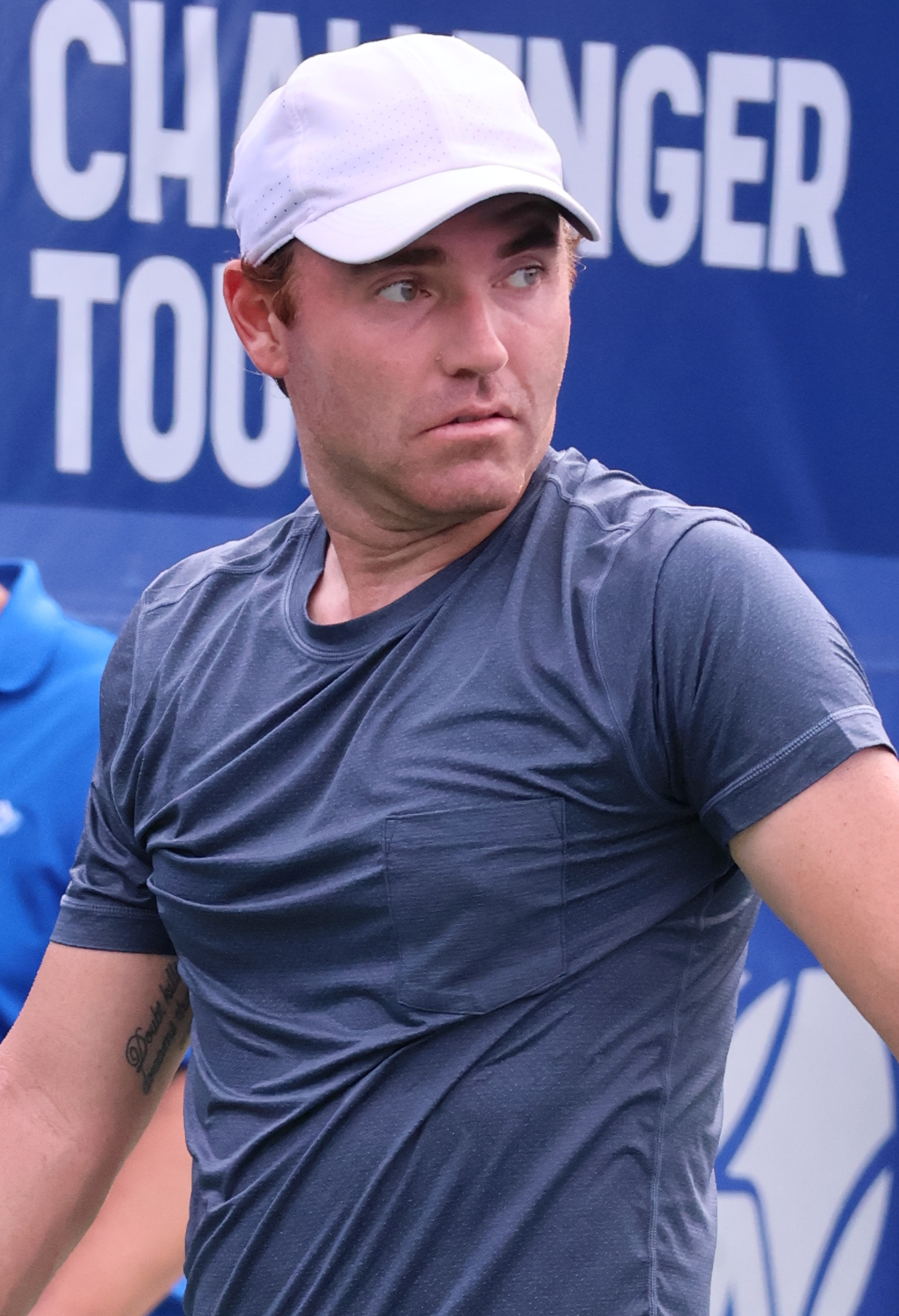
- Fratangelo at the 2023 Cary Challenger
- Country (sports): United States
- Residence: Orlando, Florida, US
- Born: July 19, 1993 (age 32) Pittsburgh, Pennsylvania, US
- Height: 1.83 m (6 ft 0 in)
- Turned pro: 2012
- Retired: 2023
- Plays: Right-handed (two-handed backhand)
- Prize money: $1,614,944

Singles
- Career record: 22–40
- Career titles: 0
- Highest ranking: No. 99 (June 6, 2016)

Grand Slam singles results
- Australian Open: 1R (2016, 2017, 2019)
- French Open: 2R (2016)
- Wimbledon: 1R (2016)
- US Open: 2R (2017)

Doubles
- Career record: 1–5 (in ATP Tour and Grand Slam main draws)
- Career titles: 0
- Highest ranking: No. 304 (April 27, 2015)

Grand Slam doubles results
- US Open: 2R (2021)

Grand Slam mixed doubles results
- US Open: 2R (2022)

Coaching career (2023–present)
- Madison Keys (2023–)
- Last updated on: 8 April 2024.

Bjorn Fratangelo (/biˈɔːrn frəˈtændʒəloʊ/ bee-ORN frə-TAN-jə-loh; born July 19, 1993) is an American tennis coach and former professional player.

In 2011, he won the boys' singles title at the French Open defeating Dominic Thiem. Fratangelo was only the second American to win the event, following John McEnroe in 1977.

== Early life ==
Fratangelo began playing tennis at age three. and is named after tennis champion Björn Borg. His father, Mario, is his coach. Fratangelo attended St. John the Baptist Catholic School in Plum, Pennsylvania, until the 8th grade. He then moved to Naples, Florida, for training reasons and was an online student of Barron Collier High School.

== Personal life ==
In November 2024, he married fellow American tennis player Madison Keys, whom he had been dating since 2017. He is Catholic.

== Juniors ==
Fratangelo won the boys' singles title at the 2011 French Open, beating Dominic Thiem in the final. The win propelled him to a career high of No. 2 in the junior rankings. He also played in the junior championship at the 2011 US Open, losing in the third round to eventual champion Oliver Golding in three sets.

== Professional ==
=== 2009-2014: Early years ===
Fratangelo has mainly played on the ITF Pro Circuit since 2009. He played sparsely in both 2009 and 2010, before playing on a much more regular basis in 2011. He made his first final in July 2011 in the USA F17 event in Pittsburgh, losing to Brian Baker in straight sets.

The following month, Fratangelo was given a wildcard for the 2011 US Open qualifiers, losing to Fritz Wolmarans in the first round of qualification.

He reached another final on the ITF Men's Circuit in May 2012, but lost in straight sets to Tennys Sandgren in Tampa, Florida.

In 2013, Fratangelo reached the semifinal in the USA F2 event in Sunrise, Florida, losing to eventual champion Robby Ginepri, and then won his first professional title the following week, beating Arthur De Greef in the final in Weston, Florida. He made his second final in as many weeks when he faced De Greef once again, but lost this time in Palm Coast, Florida.

=== 2015-2017: First major match win and top 100 ===
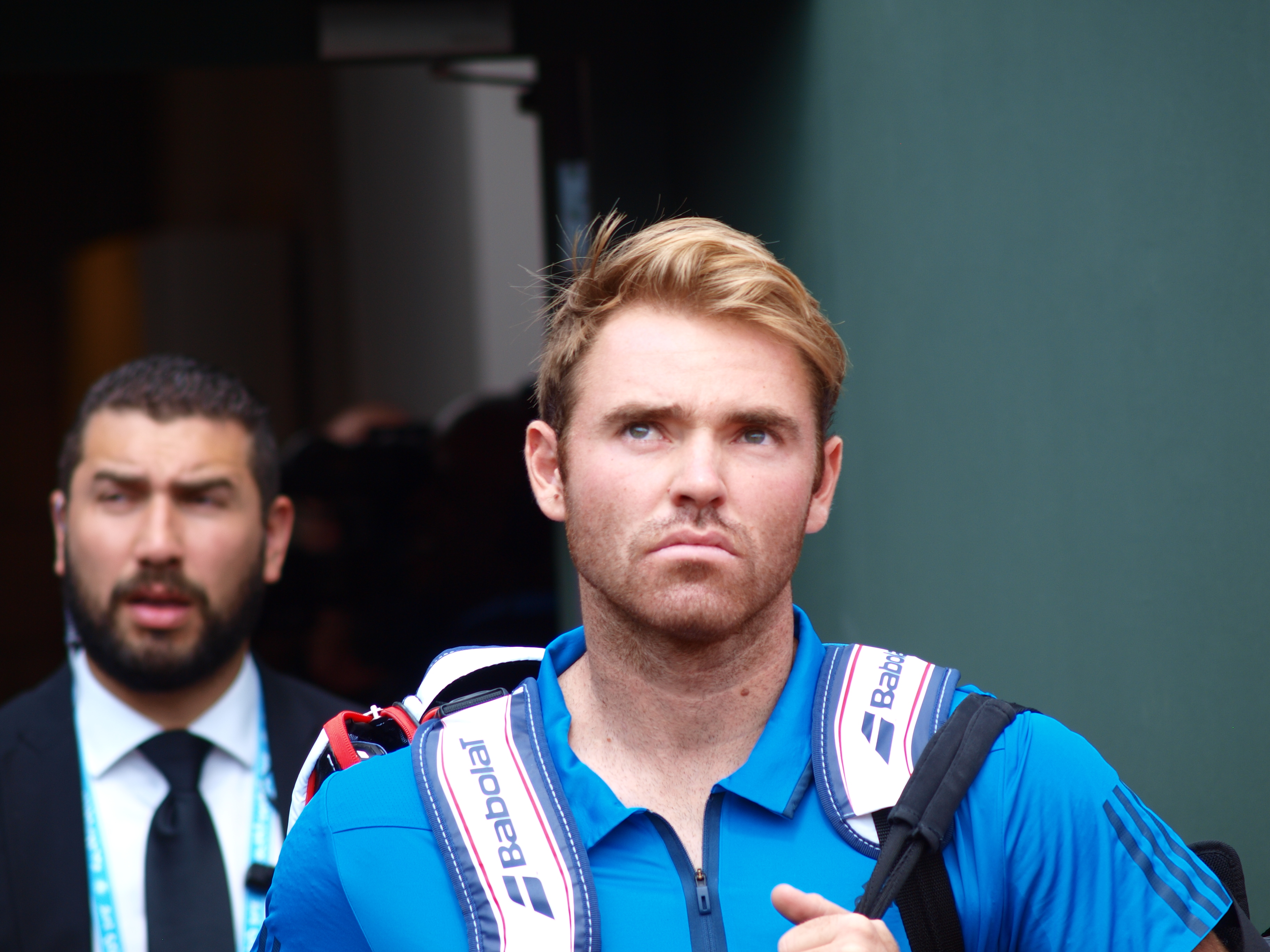
Fratangelo at the 2016 French Open

In April 2016, he won the 2016 French Open Wild Card Challenge by reaching the semifinals in Sarasota and winning the Savannah Challenger the following week. He put the wildcard to good use by defeating compatriot Sam Querrey in the first round of the French Open to crack the top 100 for the first time. His ranking of No. 99 came out on June 6, 2016, which was the 60th birthday of the man he was named after, Björn Borg. This was also his first career-match win in the main draw of a Grand Slam tournament. He lost to ninth seed Richard Gasquet in the second round.

Fratangelo reached the semifinals at the 2017 Hall of Fame Tennis Championships, losing to top seed and eventual champion John Isner.

=== 2021-2023: Mixed doubles debut and first doubles win at the US Open, retirement ===
He qualified for the main draw of the 2021 French Open, but lost to Cameron Norrie in the first round.

At the 2021 US Open, Fratangelo made his debut in mixed doubles with Madison Keys, whom he began dating four years ago. He also paired in men’s doubles with Christopher Eubanks as wildcards where he reached the second round recording his first win in doubles in his career at a Grand Slam over Frances Tiafoe and Nicholas Monroe.

He secured his main draw spot at the 2022 French Open for a second consecutive year at this major with a straight sets win over Nino Serdarušić.

Fratangelo retired from professional tennis in August 2023.

== Coaching career ==
Fratangelo began coaching Keys in June 2023 following her second-round loss at Roland Garros. He coached her to her first Grand Slam title at the 2025 Australian Open.

== ATP Challenger & ITF Futures finals ==
=== Singles: 25 (12–13) ===
Legend ATP Challenger Tour (4–8) ITF Futures Tour (8–5)	Finals by surface Hard (6–6) Clay (6–7) Grass (0–0)

Result	W–L	Date	Tournament	Tier	Surface	Opponent	Score
Loss	0–1	Jul 2011	USA F17, Pittsburgh	Futures	Clay	(United States) Brian Baker	5–7, 3–6
Loss	0–2	May 2012	USA F13, Tampa	Futures	Clay	(United States) Tennys Sandgren	1–6, 3–6
Win	1–2	Jan 2013	USA F3, Weston	Futures	Clay	(Belgium) Arthur De Greef	6–4, 3–6, 6–0
Loss	1–3	Feb 2013	USA F4, Palm Coast	Futures	Clay	(Belgium) Arthur De Greef	2–6, 3–6
Loss	1–4	Feb 2013	USA F6, Harlingen	Futures	Hard	(Czech Republic) Jiří Veselý	7–5, 6–7^{(4–7)}, 3–6
Win	2–4	May 2013	USA F12, Orange Park	Futures	Clay	(Austria) Gerald Melzer	7–5, 6–3
Win	3–4	Jun 2013	Netherlands F1, Amstelveen	Futures	Clay	(Brazil) Thiago Monteiro	3–6, 6–4, 6–3
Win	4–4	May 2014	USA F14, Tampa	Futures	Clay	(Chile) Cristian Garín	6–2, 6–3
Win	5–4	Jul 2014	Italy F22, Sassuolo	Futures	Clay	(Italy) Alberto Brizzi	6–4, 2–0 ret.
Win	6–4	Jul 2014	USA F22, Decatur	Futures	Hard	(United Kingdom) Liam Broady	6–4, 6–0
Loss	6–5	Aug 2014	Canada F7, Calgary	Futures	Clay	(United States) Daniel Nguyen	6–7^{(7–9)}, 7–5, 4–6
Win	7–5	Sep 2014	Canada F9, Toronto	Futures	Hard (i)	(United States) Mitchell Krueger	6–2, 6–3
Win	8–5	Sep 2014	Canada F10, Toronto	Futures	Hard	(United States) Eric Quigley	6–4, 6–2
Win	9–5	Feb 2015	Launceston, Australia	Challenger	Hard	(South Korea) Hyeon Chung	4–6, 6–2, 7–5
Loss	9–6	Jun 2015	Caltanisetta, Italy	Challenger	Clay	(Sweden) Elias Ymer	3–6, 2–6
Loss	9–7	Jul 2015	Binghamton, USA	Challenger	Hard	(United Kingdom) Kyle Edmund	2–6, 3–6
Win	10–7	Apr 2016	Savannah, USA	Challenger	Clay	(United States) Jared Donaldson	6–1, 6–3
Loss	10–8	May 2016	Bordeaux, France	Challenger	Clay	(Brazil) Rogério Dutra Silva	3–6, 1–6
Loss	10–9	Nov 2017	Champaign, USA	Challenger	Hard (i)	(United States) Tim Smyczek	2–6, 4–6
Win	11–9	Oct 2018	Fairfield, USA	Challenger	Hard	(Australia) Alex Bolt	6–4, 6–3
Loss	11–10	Nov 2018	Knoxville, USA	Challenger	Hard (i)	(United States) Reilly Opelka	5–7, 6–4, 6–7^{(2–7)}
Win	12–10	Mar 2021	Cleveland, USA	Challenger	Hard (i)	(United States) Jenson Brooksby	7–5, 6–4
Loss	12–11	Apr 2021	Tallahassee, USA	Challenger	Clay	(United States) Jenson Brooksby	3–6, 6–4, 3–6
Loss	12–12	Sep 2021	Cary, USA	Challenger	Hard	(United States) Mitchell Krueger	4–6, 3–6
Loss	12–13	Jan 2022	Traralgon, Australia	Challenger	Hard	(Czech Republic) Tomáš Macháč	6–7^{(2–7)}, 3–6

=== Doubles: 12 (2–10) ===
Legend ATP Challenger Tour (0–2) ITF Futures Tour (2–8)	Finals by surface Hard (0–3) Clay (2–7) Grass (0–0)

Result	W–L	Date	Tournament	Tier	Surface	Partner	Opponents	Score
Loss	0–1	Jul 2011	USA F18 Rochester	Futures	Clay	(United States) Erik Crepaldi	(United States) Maciek Shykut (United States) Denis Zivkovic	3–6, 6–2, [7–10]
Loss	0–2	Sep 2012	Canada F7 Toronto	Futures	Clay	(United States) Sekou Bangoura	(Australia) Carsten Ball (Canada) Peter Polansky	7–6^{(7–2)}, 4–6, [9–11]
Win	1–2	Oct 2012	USA F29 Birmingham	Futures	Clay	(United States) Mitchell Krueger	(United States) Chase Buchanan (United States) Vahid Mirzadeh	6–2, 6–3
Loss	1–3	Jun 2013	Netherlands F3 Breda	Futures	Clay	(United States) Mitchell Krueger	(Finland) Henri Kontinen (Poland) Christopher Rungkat	4–6, 5–7
Loss	1–4	May 2014	Tallahassee, USA	Challenger	Clay	(United States) Mitchell Krueger	(Australia) Ryan Agar (Austria) Sebastian Bader	4–6, 6–7^{(3–7)}
Loss	1–5	May 2014	USA F13, Orange Park	Futures	Clay	(United States) Mitchell Krueger	(United States) Dennis Novikov (United States) Connor Smith	3–6, 2–6
Loss	1–6	May 2014	USA F14, Tampa	Futures	Clay	(United States) Mitchell Krueger	(Chile) Nicolás Jarry (Brazil) Tiago Lopes	5–7, 4–6
Loss	1–7	Jun 2014	Italy F17, Parma	Futures	Clay	(United States) Mitchell Krueger	(Italy) Lorenzo Frigerio (Italy) Matteo Trevisan	3–6, 2–6
Win	2–7	Jul 2014	Italy F22 Sassuolo	Futures	Clay	(Brazil) Daniel Dutra da Silva	(Italy) Luca Pancaldi (Italy) Filippo Leonardi	7–5, 6–5
Loss	2–8	Aug 2014	USA F23, Edwardsville	Futures	Hard	(United States) Mitchell Krueger	(United States) Patrick Davidson (India) Saketh Myneni	3–6, 4–6
Loss	2–9	Sep 2014	Canada F9, Toronto	Futures	Hard	(United States) Mitchell Krueger	(United States) Sekou Bangoura (United States) Evan King	4–6, 6–4, [9–11]
Loss	2–10	Oct 2016	Las Vegas, USA	Challenger	Hard	(United States) Denis Kudla	(United States) Brian Baker (Australia) Matt Reid	1–6, 5–7

== Junior Grand Slam finals ==
=== Boys' singles: 1 (title) ===
Result	Year	Tournament	Surface	Opponent	Score
Win	2011	French Open	Clay	(Austria) Dominic Thiem	3–6, 6–3, 8–6

== Singles performance timeline ==
Key
W	F	SF	QF	#R	RR	Q#	P#	DNQ	A	Z#	PO	G	S	B	NMS	NTI	P	NH

(W) winner; (F) finalist; (SF) semifinalist; (QF) quarterfinalist; (#R) rounds 4, 3, 2, 1; (RR) round-robin stage; (Q#) qualification round; (P#) preliminary round; (DNQ) did not qualify; (A) absent; (Z#) Davis/Fed Cup Zonal Group (with number indication) or (PO) play-off; (G) gold, (S) silver or (B) bronze Olympic/Paralympic medal; (NMS) not a Masters tournament; (NTI) not a Tier I tournament; (P) postponed; (NH) not held; (SR) strike rate (events won / competed); (W–L) win–loss record.
To avoid confusion and double counting, these charts are updated at the conclusion of a tournament or when the player's participation has ended.

Tournament	2011	2012	2013	2014	2015	2016	2017	2018	2019	2020	2021	2022	2023	SR	W–L
Grand Slam tournaments
Australian Open	A	A	A	A	A	1R	1R	Q3	1R	A	A	Q1	A	0 / 3	0–3
French Open	A	A	A	A	Q2	2R	1R	A	Q2	A	1R	1R	A	0 / 4	1–4
Wimbledon	A	A	A	A	Q2	1R	Q2	Q2	Q3	NH	Q1	A	A	0 / 1	0–1
US Open	Q1	A	Q1	A	1R	1R	2R	Q2	1R	A	Q1	Q2	A	0 / 4	1–4
Win–loss	0–0	0–0	0–0	0–0	0–1	1–4	1–3	0–0	0–2	0–0	0–1	0–1	0–0	0 / 12	2–12
ATP Tour Masters 1000
Indian Wells Masters	A	A	A	A	Q2	2R	2R	Q1	2R	NH	Q2	Q1	A	0 / 3	3–3
Miami Open	A	A	A	A	A	1R	Q1	1R	Q2	NH	2R	Q2	A	0 / 3	1–3
Madrid Open	A	A	A	A	A	A	A	Q1	A	NH	A	A	A	0 / 0	0–0
Cincinnati Masters	A	A	A	A	1R	A	Q1	Q1	A	A	A	A	A	0 / 1	0–1
Win–loss	0–0	0–0	0–0	0–0	0–1	1–2	1–1	0–1	1–1	0–0	1–1	0–0	0–0	0 / 7	4–7
Career statistics
Tournaments	0	0	0	0	2	9	11	6	6	0	4	1	1	40	
Overall win–loss	0–0	0–0	0–0	0–0	0–2	6–9	8–11	2–6	3–6	0–0	3–4	0–1	0–1	0 / 40	22–40
Year-end ranking	785	614	308	266	128	114	110	136	207	274	166	316	698		
