= Savannah Challenger =

- 2026 Savannah Challenger

ATP Challenger Tour
- Event name: Savannah Challenger
- Location: Savannah, Georgia, United States
- Venue: Franklin Creek Tennis Center, The Landings Club
- Category: ATP Challenger Tour
- Surface: Clay (green)
- Draw: 32S/32Q/16D/4Q
- Prize money: $100,000
- Website: Website

The Savannah Challenger (currently known as St. Joseph's/Candler Savannah Challenger for sponsorship reasons) is a professional tennis tournament played on outdoor green clay courts. It is currently part of the Association of Tennis Professionals (ATP) Challenger Tour. It is held annually at the Franklin Creek Sports Complex at The Landings Club in Savannah, Georgia, United States, since 2009.

== Past finals ==
=== Singles ===
Year	Champion	Runner-up	Score
2026	(United States) Nishesh Basavareddy	(United States) Jack Kennedy	6–3, 6–0
2025	(Colombia) Nicolás Mejía	(Canada) Liam Draxl	2–6, 6–2, 7–6^{(7–3)}
2024	(Switzerland) Alexander Ritschard	(Ecuador) Andrés Andrade	6–2, 6–4
2023	(Argentina) Facundo Díaz Acosta	(United States) Tristan Boyer	6–3, 6–1
2022	(United States) Jack Sock	(United States) Christian Harrison	6–4, 6–1
2020–2021	Not held		
2019	(Argentina) Federico Coria	(Italy) Paolo Lorenzi	6–3, 4–6, 6–2
2018	(Bolivia) Hugo Dellien	(United States) Christian Harrison	6–1, 1–6, 6–4
2017	(United States) Tennys Sandgren	(Brazil) João Pedro Sorgi	6–4, 6–3
2016	(United States) Bjorn Fratangelo	(United States) Jared Donaldson	6–1, 6–3
2015	(South Korea) Chung Hyeon	(Republic of Ireland) James McGee	6–3, 6–2
2014	(Australia) Nick Kyrgios	(United States) Jack Sock	2–6, 7–6^{(7–4)}, 6–4
2013	(United States) Ryan Harrison	(Argentina) Facundo Argüello	6–2, 6–3
2012	(United States) Brian Baker	(France) Augustin Gensse	6–4, 6–3
2011	(United States) Wayne Odesnik	(United States) Donald Young	6–4, 6–4
2010	(Japan) Kei Nishikori	(United States) Ryan Sweeting	6–4, 6–0
2009	(United States) Michael Russell	(United States) Alex Kuznetsov	6–4, 7–6^{(8–6)}

=== Doubles ===
Year	Champions	Runners-up	Score
2026	(Canada) Cleeve Harper (United Kingdom) David Stevenson	(Venezuela) Luis David Martínez (Colombia) Cristian Rodríguez	7–6^{(7–4)}, 6–2
2025	(Argentina) Federico Agustín Gómez (Venezuela) Luis David Martínez (2)	(United States) Mac Kiger (United States) Patrick Maloney	3–6, 6–3, [10–5]
2024	(United States) Christian Harrison (United Kingdom) Marcus Willis	(Sweden) Simon Freund (Denmark) Johannes Ingildsen	6–3, 6–3
2023	(United States) William Blumberg (Venezuela) Luis David Martínez (1)	(Argentina) Federico Agustín Gómez (Argentina) Nicolás Kicker	6–1, 6–4
2022	(Philippines) Ruben Gonzales (Philippines) Treat Huey	(Chinese Taipei) Wu Tung-lin (China) Zhang Zhizhen	7–6^{(7–3)}, 6–4
2020–2021	Not held		
2019	(Venezuela) Roberto Maytín (Brazil) Fernando Romboli	(France) Manuel Guinard (France) Arthur Rinderknech	6–7^{(5–7)}, 6–4, [11–9]
2018	(United Kingdom) Luke Bambridge (Australia) Akira Santillan	(Spain) Enrique López Pérez (India) Jeevan Nedunchezhiyan	6–2, 6–2
2017	(Canada) Peter Polansky (United Kingdom) Neal Skupski	(United Kingdom) Luke Bambridge (United States) Mitchell Krueger	4–6, 6–3, [10–1]
2016	(United States) Brian Baker (United States) Ryan Harrison	(India) Purav Raja (India) Divij Sharan	5–7, 7–6^{(7–4)}, [10–8]
2015	(Argentina) Guillermo Durán (Argentina) Horacio Zeballos	(United States) Dennis Novikov (Chile) Julio Peralta	6–4, 6–3
2014	(Serbia) Ilija Bozoljac (New Zealand) Michael Venus	(Argentina) Facundo Bagnis (Russia) Alex Bogomolov Jr.	7–5, 6–2
2013	(Russia) Teymuraz Gabashvili (Ukraine) Denys Molchanov	(United States) Michael Russell (United States) Tim Smyczek	6–2, 7–5
2012	(Australia) Carsten Ball (2) (United States) Bobby Reynolds	(United States) Travis Parrott (Germany) Simon Stadler	7–6^{(9–7)}, 6–4
2011	(South Africa) Rik de Voest (South Africa) Izak van der Merwe	(United States) Sekou Bangoura (United States) Jesse Witten	6–3, 6–3
2010	(United Kingdom) Jamie Baker (United Kingdom) James Ward	(United States) Bobby Reynolds (South Africa) Fritz Wolmarans	6–3, 6–4
2009	(Australia) Carsten Ball (1) (United States) Travis Rettenmaier	(India) Harsh Mankad (United States) Kaes Van't Hof	7–6^{(7–4)}, 6–4
