= 2010 USTA Challenger of Oklahoma – Singles =

Singles
- 2010 USTA Challenger of Oklahoma

Final
- Champion: (United States) Bobby Reynolds
- Runner-up: (United States) Lester Cook
- Score: 6–3, 6–3

Events
Singles	Doubles
← 2009 ·	USTA Challenger of Oklahoma	· 2011 →

Taylor Dent was the champion in 2009, but he retired in the first round match, against Oleksandr Nedovyesov due to fatigue.
Bobby Reynolds won the title after defeating Lester Cook in the final 6–3, 6–3.

== Seeds ==
1. (United States) Taylor Dent (first round, retired due to fatigue)
2. (United States) Donald Young (first round)
3. (United States) Kevin Kim (quarterfinals, retired)
4. (United States) Jesse Levine (first round)
5. (United States) Jesse Witten (quarterfinals)
6. (United States) Tim Smyczek (semifinals)
7. (United States) Lester Cook (final)
8. (United States) Michael Yani (second round)

== Draw ==
=== Key ===
- Q = Qualifier
- WC = Wild card
- LL = Lucky loser
- Alt = Alternate
- SE = Special exempt
- PR = Protected ranking
- ITF = ITF entry
- JE = Junior exempt
- w/o = Walkover
- r = Retired
- d = Defaulted
- SR = Special ranking

=== Finals ===
Semifinals
7	(United States) Lester Cook	6	3
(South Africa) Andrew Anderson	2	0^{r}
(United States) Bobby Reynolds	6	6
6	(United States) Tim Smyczek	0	0

Final
7	(United States) Lester Cook	3	3
(United States) Bobby Reynolds	6	6

=== Top half ===
First round
1	(United States) T Dent	4	0
Q	(Ukraine) O Nedovyesov	6	3^{r}
(United States) E Nunez	6^{6}	3
(United States) M McClune	7	6
(United States) J Cox	3	7	6^{5}
(Switzerland) A Sadecky	6	6^{2}	7
(Austria) N Moser	2	1
7	(United States) L Cook	6	6
3	(United States) K Kim	3	6	6
WC	(Australia) Mark van Elden	6	2	3
(France) F Martin	6	4	2
WC	(United States) P Simmonds	4	6	6
Q	(Romania) Ionuț Beleleu	0	6^{1}
(South Africa) A Anderson	6	7
Q	(Romania) A Dăescu	4	0
8	(United States) M Yani	6	6

Second round
Q	(Ukraine) O Nedovyesov	3	1
(United States) M McClune	6	6
(Switzerland) A Sadecky	3	1
7	(United States) L Cook	6	6
3	(United States) K Kim	6	6
WC	(United States) P Simmonds	4	4
(South Africa) A Anderson	6	6
8	(United States) M Yani	4	4

Quarterfinals
(United States) M McClune	0	6^{5}
7	(United States) L Cook	6	7
3	(United States) K Kim	1	r
(South Africa) A Anderson	6

Semifinals
7	(United States) L Cook	6	3
(South Africa) A Anderson	2	0	r

=== Bottom half ===
First round
5	(United States) J Witten	6	6
WC	(United States) D Martin	2	4
(United States) B Evans	3	6^{5}
(United States) Greg Ouellette	6	7
(United States) A Kuznetsov	6	6
(Canada) P-L Duclos	4	3
(United States) B Reynolds	6	6
4	(United States) J Levine	2	1
6	(United States) T Smyczek	6	6
(Canada) V Pospisil	2	1
Q	(South Africa) F Wolmarans	4	6^{5}
(Canada) Chris Klingemann	6	7
(Russia) A Sitak	5	6	5
(South Korea) D Yoo	7	2	7
WC	(United States) B Strode	6	7
2	(United States) D Young	3	6^{4}

Second round
5	(United States) J Witten	7	6
(United States) G Ouellette	6	2
(United States) A Kuznetsov	4	6^{3}
(United States) B Reynolds	6	7
6	(United States) T Smyczek	5	6	6
(Canada) C Klingemann	7	2	2
(South Korea) D Yoo	6	6
WC	(United States) B Strode	4	3

Quarterfinals
5	(United States) J Witten	3	2
(United States) B Reynolds	6	6
6	(United States) T Smyczek	6	7
(South Korea) D Yoo	0	6^{0}

Semifinals
(United States) B Reynolds	6	6
6	(United States) T Smyczek	0	0
