= 2010 USTA Challenger of Oklahoma – Doubles =

Doubles
- 2010 USTA Challenger of Oklahoma

Final
- Champions: (South Africa) Andrew Anderson (South Africa) Fritz Wolmarans
- Runners-up: (United States) Brett Joelson (Canada) Chris Klingemann
- Score: 6–2, 6–3

Events
| Singles | Doubles |
| ← 2009 · | USTA Challenger of Oklahoma | · 2011 → |

David Martin and Rajeev Ram were the defending champions.
Ram chose not to participate, Martin partnered up with Lester Cook, but they lost to Andrew Anderson and Fritz Wolmarans in the semifinals.
South African players won this tournament. They defeated qualifiers Brett Joelson and Chris Klingemann 6–2, 6–3 in the final.

== Seeds ==
1. (United States) Lester Cook / (United States) David Martin (semifinals)
2. (Canada) Pierre-Ludovic Duclos / (Canada) Vasek Pospisil (semifinals)
3. (Austria) Nikolaus Moser / (Russia) Artem Sitak (quarterfinals)
4. (United States) Alex Kuznetsov / (United States) Jesse Witten (first round)

== Draw ==
=== Key ===
- Q = Qualifier
- WC = Wild card
- LL = Lucky loser
- Alt = Alternate
- SE = Special exempt
- PR = Protected ranking
- ITF = ITF entry
- JE = Junior exempt
- w/o = Walkover
- r = Retired
- d = Defaulted
- SR = Special ranking

=== Draw ===
First round
1 | (United States) L Cook (United States) D Martin | 7 | 6
(United States) K Kim (South Korea) D Yoo | 5 | 0
(United States) Ashwin Kumar (France) F Martin
(United States) J Levine (United States) Greg Ouellette | w/o
3 | (Austria) N Moser (Russia) A Sitak | 7 | 6
(United States) J Cox (United States) D Young | 6^{5} | 4
(South Africa) A Anderson (South Africa) F Wolmarans | 6 | 7
(United States) B Reynolds (United States) T Smyczek | 1 | 6^{1}
(United States) E Nunez (Switzerland) A Sadecky | 6 | 7
WC | (Uzbekistan) R Biktyakov (Ukraine) O Nedovyesov | 2 | 6^{4}
Q | (United States) Brett Joelson (Canada) Chris Klingemann | 6 | 7
4 | (United States) A Kuznetsov (United States) J Witten | 4 | 5
WC | (El Salvador) M Arévalo (United Kingdom) Ashley Watling | 0 | 6 | [10]
(United States) B Evans (United States) P Simmonds | 6 | 4 | [7]
WC | (Romania) A Dăescu (United States) Will Gray | 3 | 2
2 | (Canada) P-L Duclos (Canada) V Pospisil | 6 | 6

Quarterfinals
1 | (United States) L Cook (United States) D Martin | 7 | 6^{2} | [10]
(United States) Ashwin Kumar (France) F Martin | 5 | 7 | [6]
3 | (Austria) N Moser (Russia) A Sitak | 4 | 1
(South Africa) A Anderson (South Africa) F Wolmarans | 6 | 6
(United States) E Nunez (Switzerland) A Sadecky | w/o
Q | (United States) B Joelson (Canada) C Klingemann
WC | (El Salvador) M Arévalo (United Kingdom) A Watling | 4 | 4
2 | (Canada) P-L Duclos (Canada) V Pospisil | 6 | 6

Semifinals
1 | (United States) L Cook (United States) D Martin | 7 | 3 | [8]
(South Africa) A Anderson (South Africa) F Wolmarans | 5 | 6 | [10]
Q | (United States) B Joelson (Canada) C Klingemann | 2 | 7 | [10]
2 | (Canada) P-L Duclos (Canada) V Pospisil | 6 | 6^{5} | [3]

Finals
(South Africa) A Anderson (South Africa) F Wolmarans | 6 | 6
Q | (United States) B Joelson (Canada) C Klingemann | 2 | 3
