= 2009 USTA Challenger of Oklahoma – Singles =

Singles
- 2009 USTA Challenger of Oklahoma

Final
- Champion: (United States) Taylor Dent
- Runner-up: (United States) Wayne Odesnik
- Score: 7–6(9), 7–6(4)

Events
Singles	Doubles
← 2008 ·	USTA Challenger of Oklahoma	· 2010 →

Taylor Dent won the title by the score of 7–6(9), 7–6(4) in the final over Wayne Odesnik.

== Seeds ==
1. (United States) Wayne Odesnik (final)
2. (United States) Rajeev Ram (second round)
3. (United States) Brendan Evans (first round)
4. (United States) Vince Spadea (first round)
5. (United States) Jesse Levine (quarterfinals)
6. (United States) Ryan Sweeting (quarterfinals)
7. (United States) Taylor Dent (champion)
8. (United States) Alex Kuznetsov (first round)

== Draw ==
=== Key ===
- Q = Qualifier
- WC = Wild card
- LL = Lucky loser
- Alt = Alternate
- SE = Special exempt
- PR = Protected ranking
- ITF = ITF entry
- JE = Junior exempt
- w/o = Walkover
- r = Retired
- d = Defaulted
- SR = Special ranking

=== Final four ===
Semifinals
1	(United States) Wayne Odesnik	7	6
(Armenia) Tigran Martirosyan	6^{5}	2
(United States) Todd Widom	2	1
7/WC	(United States) Taylor Dent	6	6

Final
1	(United States) Wayne Odesnik	6^{9}	6^{4}
7/WC	(United States) Taylor Dent	7	7

=== Top half ===
First round
1	(United States) W Odesnik	6	6
Q	(Romania) A Daescu	2	2
(United States) E Nunez	3	1
(Tunisia) M Jaziri	6	6
(United States) L Cook	3	2
(United States) S Jenkins	6	6
(Germany) L Pörschke	6	3	3
5	(United States) J Levine	3	6	6
4	(United States) V Spadea	2	2
(United States) M Yani	6	6
(Armenia) T Martirosyan	6	6
Q	(Ukraine) O Nedovyesov	4	2
(Canada) M Raonic	6^{11}	7	6^{2}
(Canada) P Bester	7	5	7
(Japan) T Matsui	2	0
6	(United States) R Sweeting	6	6

Second round
1	(United States) W Odesnik	6	6
(Tunisia) M Jaziri	1	2
(United States) S Jenkins	1	1
5	(United States) J Levine	6	6
(United States) M Yani	4	2
(Armenia) T Martirosyan	6	6
(Canada) P Bester	3	3
6	(United States) R Sweeting	6	6

Quarterfinals
1	(United States) W Odesnik	3	6	7
5	(United States) J Levine	6	3	5
(Armenia) T Martirosyan	7	7
6	(United States) R Sweeting	5	5

Semifinals
1	(United States) W Odesnik	7	6
(Armenia) T Martirosyan	6^{5}	2

=== Bottom half ===
First round
8	(United States) A Kuznetsov	6	3	4
(United States) J Witten	3	6	6
(United States) T Widom	4	6	6
WC	(United States) D Martin	6	3	2
(Russia) A Sitak	7	7
(United States) M McClune	5	5
(India) P Amritraj	4	6	7
3	(United States) B Evans	6	2	6^{8}
7/WC	(United States) T Dent	6	6
(Mexico) B Rodríguez	3	0
WC	(United States) B Strode	2	7	2
(United States) T Smyczek	6	6^{3}	6
WC	(United States) A Krajicek	6	6^{6}	2
Q	(Mexico) D Garza	3	7	6
Q	(Spain) A Brugués Davi	5	5
2	(United States) R Ram	7	7

Second round
(United States) J Witten	4	2
(United States) T Widom	6	6
(Russia) A Sitak	6	7
(India) P Amritraj	4	6^{4}
7/WC	(United States) T Dent	6	6
(United States) T Smyczek	3	4
Q	(Mexico) D Garza	6^{4}	6	7
2	(United States) R Ram	7	3	5

Quarterfinals
(United States) T Widom	6	7
(Russia) A Sitak	2	6^{13}
7/WC	(United States) T Dent	6	6
Q	(Mexico) D Garza	2	1

Semifinals
(United States) T Widom	2	1
7/WC	(United States) T Dent	6	6
