= 2011 USTA Challenger of Oklahoma – Doubles =

Doubles
- 2011 USTA Challenger of Oklahoma

Final
- Champions: (United States) David Martin (United States) Bobby Reynolds
- Runners-up: (United States) Sam Querrey (United States) Chris Wettengel
- Score: 6–4, 6–2

Events
Singles	Doubles
← 2010 ·	USTA Challenger of Oklahoma	· 2012 →

Andrew Anderson and Fritz Wolmarans were the defending champions, but decided not to participate.

David Martin and Bobby Reynolds won the title, defeating Sam Querrey and Chris Wettengel 6–4, 6–2 in the final.

== Seeds ==
1. (United States) David Martin / (United States) Bobby Reynolds (champions)
2. (Mexico) Luis Díaz-Barriga / (United Kingdom) Chris Eaton (quarterfinals)
3. (United States) Alex Kuznetsov / (United States) Tim Smyczek (first round)
4. (Belarus) Sergey Betov / (New Zealand) Artem Sitak (semifinals)

== Draw ==
=== Key ===
- Q = Qualifier
- WC = Wild card
- LL = Lucky loser
- Alt = Alternate
- SE = Special exempt
- PR = Protected ranking
- ITF = ITF entry
- JE = Junior exempt
- w/o = Walkover
- r = Retired
- d = Defaulted
- SR = Special ranking

=== Draw ===
First round
1	(United States) D Martin (United States) B Reynolds	6	6
(United States) D Kosakowski (United States) M McClune	3	2
(United States) A El Mihdawy (United States) B Strode	3	2
(United States) R Ram (United States) M Shabaz	6	6
3	(United States) A Kuznetsov (United States) T Smyczek	6^{6}	1
Q	(Venezuela) R Maytín (Australia) J Peers	7^{8}	6
(Romania) A Dăescu (United States) Joshua Zavala	5	2
(Dominican Republic) V Estrella (United States) Greg Ouellette	7	6
(United States) D Kudla (United States) J Sock	7	6
WC	(Australia) Clifford Marsland (United Kingdom) Ashley Watling	5	4
WC	(United Kingdom) Maniel Bains (United States) Eric West	6	5	[7]
4	(Belarus) S Betov (New Zealand) A Sitak	3	7	[10]
(Romania) C Gârd (Japan) Bumpei Sato	0	1
(United States) S Querrey (United States) C Wettengel	6	6
WC	(United States) Benjamin Rogers (Australia) J-P Smith	1^{r}
2	(Mexico) L Díaz-Barriga (United Kingdom) C Eaton	4

Quarterfinals
1	(United States) D Martin (United States) B Reynolds	7	6
(United States) R Ram (United States) M Shabaz	5	4
Q	(Venezuela) R Maytín (Australia) J Peers	6	6
(Dominican Republic) V Estrella (United States) G Ouellette	3	2
(United States) D Kudla (United States) J Sock	4	6	[9]
4	(Belarus) S Betov (New Zealand) A Sitak	6	0	[11]
(United States) S Querrey (United States) C Wettengel	6^{6}	7^{7}	[12]
2	(Mexico) L Díaz-Barriga (United Kingdom) C Eaton	7^{8}	6^{5}	[10]

Semifinals
1	(United States) D Martin (United States) B Reynolds	6	6
Q	(Venezuela) R Maytín (Australia) J Peers	3	2
4	(Belarus) S Betov (New Zealand) A Sitak	3	6^{5}
(United States) S Querrey (United States) C Wettengel	6	7^{7}

Final
1	(United States) D Martin (United States) B Reynolds	6	6
(United States) S Querrey (United States) C Wettengel	4	2
