= 2010 USTA Challenger of Oklahoma =

- Date: 13–19 September
- Edition: 2nd
- Surface: Hard
- Location: Tulsa, United States

Champions

Singles
- (United States) Bobby Reynolds

Doubles
- (South Africa) Andrew Anderson / (South Africa) Fritz Wolmarans
← 2009 ·	USTA Challenger of Oklahoma	· 2011 →

The 2010 USTA Challenger of Oklahoma was a professional tennis tournament played on hard courts. It was the 18th edition of the tournament which is part of the 2010 ATP Challenger Tour. It took place in Tulsa, United States between 13 and 19 September 2010.

== Singles main-draw entrants ==
=== Seeds ===
Nationality	Player	Ranking*	Seeding
USA	Taylor Dent	72	1
USA	Donald Young	100	2
USA	Kevin Kim	151	3
USA	Jesse Levine	165	4
USA	Jesse Witten	179	5
USA	Tim Smyczek	186	6
USA	Lester Cook	222	7
USA	Michael Yani	226	8

- Rankings are as of August 30, 2010.

=== Other entrants ===
The following players received wildcards into the singles main draw:

- (United States) David Martin
- (United States) Phillip Simmonds
- (United States) Blake Strode
- (Australia) Mark van Elden

The following players received entry from the qualifying draw:

- (Romania) Ionuț Beleleu
- (Romania) Andrei Dăescu
- (Ukraine) Oleksandr Nedovyesov
- (South Africa) Fritz Wolmarans

== Champions ==
=== Singles ===
(United States) Bobby Reynolds def. (United States) Lester Cook, 6–3, 6–3

=== Doubles ===
(South Africa) Andrew Anderson / (South Africa) Fritz Wolmarans def. (United States) Brett Joelson / (Canada) Chris Klingemann, 6–2, 6–3
