= 2011 USTA Challenger of Oklahoma – Singles =

Singles
- 2011 USTA Challenger of Oklahoma

Final
- Champion: (United States) Bobby Reynolds
- Runner-up: (United States) Michael McClune
- Score: 6–1, 6–3

Events
Singles	Doubles
← 2010 ·	USTA Challenger of Oklahoma	· 2012 →

Bobby Reynolds defended his title by defeating Michael McClune 6–1, 6–3 in the final.

== Seeds ==
1. (United States) Sam Querrey (semifinals)
2. (United States) Michael Russell (semifinals, withdrew due to illness)
3. (United States) Bobby Reynolds (champion)
4. (United States) Wayne Odesnik (second round, retired due to a quad strain)
5. (Dominican Republic) Víctor Estrella (first round)
6. (United States) Rajeev Ram (quarterfinals)
7. (United States) Tim Smyczek (quarterfinals)
8. (United States) Alex Kuznetsov (first round, retired due to a quad strain)

== Draw ==
=== Key ===
- Q = Qualifier
- WC = Wild card
- LL = Lucky loser
- Alt = Alternate
- SE = Special exempt
- PR = Protected ranking
- ITF = ITF entry
- JE = Junior exempt
- w/o = Walkover
- r = Retired
- d = Defaulted
- SR = Special ranking

=== Finals ===
Semifinals
1	(United States) Sam Querrey	6	6^{7}	4
Q	(United States) Michael McClune	4	7^{9}	6
3	(United States) Bobby Reynolds	w/o
2	(United States) Michael Russell

Final
Q	(United States) Michael McClune	1	3
3	(United States) Bobby Reynolds	6	6

=== Top half ===
First round
1	(United States) S Querrey	7	6
(United States) D Martin	5	2
WC	(United States) M Shabaz	6	7^{7}
(United States) Greg Ouellette	4	6^{4}
WC	(United States) J Sock	2	4
(United Kingdom) A Bogdanovic	6	6
Q	(United States) C Wettengel	6	5
8	(United States) A Kuznetsov	4	2^{r}
4	(United States) W Odesnik	6	6
(Belarus) S Betov	1	2
(Australia) J Peers	4	4
Q	(United States) M McClune	6	6
(United States) D Kosakowski	6	6
(New Zealand) A Sitak	2	1
(United States) K Kim	6	6
5	(Dominican Republic) V Estrella	1	2

Second round
1	(United States) S Querrey	7	7
WC	(United States) M Shabaz	5	5
(United Kingdom) A Bogdanovic	6	7
Q	(United States) C Wettengel	2	5
4	(United States) W Odesnik	4	2^{r}
Q	(United States) M McClune	6	3
(United States) D Kosakowski	6	4	6
(United States) K Kim	3	6	4

Quarterfinals
1	(United States) S Querrey	6	6
(United Kingdom) A Bogdanovic	4	4
Q	(United States) M McClune	7^{8}	6
(United States) D Kosakowski	6^{6}	4

Semifinals
1	(United States) S Querrey	6	6^{7}	4
Q	(United States) M McClune	4	7^{9}	6

=== Bottom half ===
First round
7	(United States) T Smyczek	6	6
(United States) D Kudla	3	1
WC	(Australia) J-P Smith	6	6^{3}	6
(United States) A El Mihdawy	1	7^{7}	4
(Switzerland) Luca Margaroli	1	1
(United Kingdom) C Eaton	6	6
(United States) B Strode	7^{7}	3	4
3	(United States) B Reynolds	6^{3}	6	6
6	(United States) R Ram	6	6
(Japan) Bumpei Sato	2	1
Q	(Romania) A Dăescu	6	2	4
(Romania) C Gârd	1	6	6
WC	(United States) J Dadamo	7^{15}	3	6^{4}
(Mexico) L Díaz Barriga	6^{13}	6	7^{7}
Q	(Romania) Costin Pavăl	2	5
2	(United States) M Russell	6	7

Second round
7	(United States) T Smyczek	7	6
WC	(Australia) J-P Smith	5	2
(United Kingdom) C Eaton	2	2
3	(United States) B Reynolds	6	6
6	(United States) R Ram	6	6
(Romania) C Gârd	2	1
(Mexico) L Díaz Barriga	1	0
2	(United States) M Russell	6	6

Quarterfinals
7	(United States) T Smyczek	0	2
3	(United States) B Reynolds	6	6
6	(United States) R Ram	1	6	3
2	(United States) M Russell	6	3	6

Semifinals
3	(United States) B Reynolds	w/o
2	(United States) M Russell
