= 2009 USTA Challenger of Oklahoma – Doubles =

Doubles
- 2009 USTA Challenger of Oklahoma

Final
- Champions: (United States) David Martin (United States) Rajeev Ram
- Runners-up: (United Kingdom) Phillip Stephens (United Kingdom) Ashley Watling
- Score: 6–2, 6–2

Events
Singles	Doubles
← 2008 ·	USTA Challenger of Oklahoma	· 2010 →

David Martin and Rajeev Ram won this tournament, by defeating Phillip Stephens and Ashley Watling 6–2, 6–2 in the final.

== Seeds ==
1. (United States) David Martin / (United States) Rajeev Ram (champions)
2. (United States) Brendan Evans / (Germany) Frank Moser (quarterfinals)
3. (India) Prakash Amritraj / (United States) Rylan Rizza (first round)
4. (United States) Lester Cook / (United States) Kaes Van't Hof (first round)

== Draw ==
=== Key ===
- Q = Qualifier
- WC = Wild card
- LL = Lucky loser
- Alt = Alternate
- SE = Special exempt
- PR = Protected ranking
- ITF = ITF entry
- JE = Junior exempt
- w/o = Walkover
- r = Retired
- d = Defaulted
- SR = Special ranking

=== Draw ===
First round
1	(United States) D Martin (United States) R Ram	7	6
(United States) T Widom (United States) M Yani	6^{2}	2
(Spain) A Brugués-Davi (United States) W Gray	6	3	[10]
(United States) W Odesnik (United States) J Witten	3	6	[6]
4	(United States) L Cook (United States) K Van't Hof	7	1	[8]
(United States) A Kuznetsov (United States) T Smyczek	6^{2}	6	[10]
WC	(United Kingdom) A Barnes (South Africa) T Liversage	3	0
(Australia) N Roshan (Russia) A Sitak	6	6
WC	(Canada) P Bester (Canada) Kamil Pajkowski	6	5	[7]
(Mexico) D Garza (United States) E Nunez	3	7	[10]
(Mexico) V Romero (Mexico) B Rodríguez	7	4	[10]
3	(India) P Amritraj (United States) R Rizza	6^{10}	6	[7]
WC	(United Kingdom) P Stephens (United Kingdom) A Watling	6	7
(Tunisia) M Jaziri (Romania) C Pavăl	4	6^{4}
(Japan) T Matsui (Canada) M Raonic	4	5
2	(United States) B Evans (Germany) F Moser	6	7

Quarterfinals
1	(United States) D Martin (United States) R Ram	6	6
(Spain) A Brugués-Davi (United States) W Gray	3	4
(United States) A Kuznetsov (United States) T Smyczek	3	6	[7]
(Australia) N Roshan (Russia) A Sitak	6	2	[10]
(Mexico) D Garza (United States) E Nunez	2	2
(Mexico) V Romero (Mexico) B Rodríguez	6	6
WC	(United Kingdom) P Stephens (United Kingdom) A Watling	7	4	[10]
2	(United States) B Evans (Germany) F Moser	5	6	[8]

Semifinals
1	(United States) D Martin (United States) R Ram	7	7
(Australia) N Roshan (Russia) A Sitak	5	6^{5}
(Mexico) V Romero (Mexico) B Rodríguez	3	4
WC	(United Kingdom) P Stephens (United Kingdom) A Watling	6	6

Finals
1	(United States) D Martin (United States) R Ram	6	6
WC	(United Kingdom) P Stephens (United Kingdom) A Watling	2	2
