= 2011 Delray Beach International Tennis Championships – Singles qualifying =

This article displays the qualifying draw of the 2011 Delray Beach International Tennis Championships.

== Players ==
=== Seeds ===
1. (Slovenia) Blaž Kavčič (qualifier)
2. (Russia) Igor Kunitsyn (qualifying competition, lucky loser)
3. (Czech Republic) Jan Hájek (qualifying competition, lucky loser)
4. (Slovakia) Lukáš Lacko (second round)
5. (United States) Ryan Sweeting (qualifier)
6. (Colombia) Alejandro Falla (qualifier)
7. (Australia) Marinko Matosevic (qualifier)
8. (United States) Donald Young (qualifying competition, lucky loser)

=== Qualifiers ===
1. (Slovenia) Blaž Kavčič
2. (Australia) Marinko Matosevic
3. (United States) Ryan Sweeting
4. (Colombia) Alejandro Falla

=== Lucky losers ===
1. (Russia) Igor Kunitsyn
2. (Czech Republic) Jan Hájek
3. (United States) Donald Young
4. (Colombia) Robert Farah

== Qualifying draw ==
=== First qualifier ===
First round
1	(Slovenia) Blaž Kavčič	6	6
(Ecuador) Giovanni Lapentti	2	2
(United States) Rajeev Ram	7	6
WC	(United States) Eric Hechtman	5	2
(Dominican Republic) Víctor Estrella	7	6
(United States) Jesse Witten	6^{3}	4
(South Africa) Fritz Wolmarans	3	0^{r}
8	(United States) Donald Young	6	1

Second round
1	(Slovenia) Blaž Kavčič	6	6
(United States) Rajeev Ram	4	3
(Dominican Republic) Víctor Estrella	3	4
8	(United States) Donald Young	6	6

Qualifying competition
1	(Slovenia) Blaž Kavčič	6	6
8	(United States) Donald Young	2	3

=== Second qualifier ===
First round
2	(Russia) Igor Kunitsyn	7	4	6
(United States) Tim Smyczek	5	6	2
(Australia) Matthew Ebden	6	6
WC	(United States) Bjorn Fratangelo	2	3
WC	(Italy) Stefano Ianni	4	1
(United States) Bobby Reynolds	6	6
Alt	(South Africa) Raven Klaasen	6^{1}	6	3
7	(Australia) Marinko Matosevic	7	3	6

Second round
2	(Russia) Igor Kunitsyn	6	6
(Australia) Matthew Ebden	3	4
(United States) Bobby Reynolds	3	2
7	(Australia) Marinko Matosevic	6	6

Qualifying competition
2	(Russia) Igor Kunitsyn	6	3	3
7	(Australia) Marinko Matosevic	1	6	6

=== Third qualifier ===
First round
3	(Czech Republic) Jan Hájek	7	6
(Canada) Peter Polansky	6^{6}	4
(United States) Lester Cook	4	3
(Australia) Samuel Groth	6	6
(Austria) Alexander Peya	4	4
WC	(United States) Jack Sock	6	6
(United States) Alex Bogomolov, Jr.	6	2	3
5	(United States) Ryan Sweeting	3	6	6

Second round
3	(Czech Republic) Jan Hájek	7	7
(Australia) Samuel Groth	6^{5}	5
WC	(United States) Jack Sock	4	0
5	(United States) Ryan Sweeting	6	6

Qualifying competition
3	(Czech Republic) Jan Hájek	3	4
5	(United States) Ryan Sweeting	6	6

=== Fourth qualifier ===
First round
4	(Slovakia) Lukáš Lacko	7	6
(Australia) Bernard Tomic	5	3
(Canada) Frank Dancevic	7	6
Alt	(United States) Michael McClune	6^{3}	3
(South Africa) Izak van der Merwe	4	4
(United States) Alex Kuznetsov	6	6
(Colombia) Robert Farah	2	4
6	(Colombia) Alejandro Falla	6	6

Second round
4	(Slovakia) Lukáš Lacko	4	6^{3}
(Canada) Frank Dancevic	6	7
(United States) Alex Kuznetsov	3	3
6	(Colombia) Alejandro Falla	6	6

Qualifying competition
(Canada) Frank Dancevic	4	2
6	(Colombia) Alejandro Falla	6	6
