= 2011 SAP Open – Singles Qualifying =

This article displays the qualifying draw of the 2011 SAP Open.

== Players ==
=== Seeds ===
1. (Colombia) Robert Farah (qualified)
2. (United States) Alex Kuznetsov (qualified)
3. (United States) Jesse Levine (qualified)
4. (United States) Nicholas Monroe (first round)
5. (New Zealand) Artem Sitak (second round)
6. (Moldova) Roman Borvanov (qualified)
7. (Canada) Pierre-Ludovic Duclos (qualifying competition)
8. (Slovenia) Luka Gregorc (qualifying competition)

=== Qualifiers ===
1. (Colombia) Robert Farah
2. (United States) Alex Kuznetsov
3. (United States) Jesse Levine
4. (Moldova) Roman Borvanov

== Qualifying draw ==
=== First qualifier ===
Second Round
1	(Colombia) Robert Farah	6	6^{6}	6
WC	(Czech Republic) Rudolf Swiy	1	7	3
(Germany) Michael Kohlmann	2	4
8	(Slovenia) Luka Gregorc	6	6

Qualifying Competition
1	(Colombia) Robert Farah	7	5	6
8	(Slovenia) Luka Gregorc	5	7	2

=== Second qualifier ===
First Round				Second Round					Qualifying Competition
				2	(United States) Alex Kuznetsov	7	6^{3}	6
	(United States) Brian Brogan	3	2	WC	(United States) Michael McClune	5	7	3
WC	(United States) Michael McClune	6	6						2	(United States) Alex Kuznetsov	6	6
	(United States) John Paul Fruttero	6	7						7	(Canada) Pierre-Ludovic Duclos	4	2
	(United States) Chris Wettengel	3	5		(United States) John Paul Fruttero	3	3
				7	(Canada) Pierre-Ludovic Duclos	6	6

=== Third qualifier ===
First Round					Second Round				Qualifying Competition
					3	(United States) Jesse Levine	6	6
(Australia) Brad Weston		6	3	5		(United States) Travis Parrott	4	2
(United States) Travis Parrott		3	6	7					3	(United States) Jesse Levine	3	6	6
WC	(Brazil) Pedro Zerbini	1	6^{5}							(Chinese Taipei) Jimmy Wang	6	2	2
	(Chinese Taipei) Jimmy Wang	6	7			(Chinese Taipei) Jimmy Wang	6	6
					5	(New Zealand) Artem Sitak	3	3

=== Fourth qualifier ===
First Round				Second Round					Qualifying Competition
				4	(United States) Nicholas Monroe	6^{3}	3
	(Chinese Taipei) Chen Ti	6	6		(Chinese Taipei) Chen Ti	7	6
WC	(United States) Eric Johnson	1	1							(Chinese Taipei) Chen Ti	2	3
(United States) Jordan Cox		6	7						6	(Moldova) Roman Borvanov	6	6
(Ukraine) Ivan Anikanov		3	6^{4}		(United States) Jordan Cox	4	7	6^{5}
				6	(Moldova) Roman Borvanov	6	6^{7}	7
