= 2011 Winston-Salem Open – Singles qualifying =

This article shows the Qualifying Draw for the 2011 Winston–Salem Open.

== Players ==
=== Seeds ===
1. (Japan) Kei Nishikori (qualified)
2. (United States) Michael Russell (qualified)
3. (Brazil) Ricardo Mello (qualified)
4. (France) Julien Benneteau (qualified)
5. (France) Édouard Roger-Vasselin (qualifying competition) (lucky loser)
6. (Australia) Peter Luczak (first round)
7. (Australia) Carsten Ball (qualifying competition)
8. (Canada) Érik Chvojka (first round)

== Qualifiers ==
1. (Japan) Kei Nishikori
2. (United States) Michael Russell
3. (Brazil) Ricardo Mello
4. (France) Julien Benneteau

== Lucky losers ==
1. (France) Édouard Roger-Vasselin
2. (Canada) Pierre-Ludovic Duclos

== Qualifying draw ==
=== First qualifier ===
First round
1	(Japan) Kei Nishikori	6	6
(United States) Kevin Kim	2	1
(South Korea) Daniel Yoo	6	1
(United States) Greg Ouellette	1	0^{r}
(United States) Christian Welte	3	2
(United States) Jordan Cox	6	6
(United States) Andrew Carter	2	4
7	(Australia) Carsten Ball	6	6

Second round
1	(Japan) Kei Nishikori	6	6
(South Korea) Daniel Yoo	1	4
(United States) Jordan Cox	2	6^{4}
7	(Australia) Carsten Ball	6	7^{7}

Qualifying competition
1	(Japan) Kei Nishikori	6	6
7	(Australia) Carsten Ball	3	4

=== Second qualifier ===
First round
2	(United States) Michael Russell	6	6
(United States) Mitchell Polnet	1	2
(Bulgaria) Dimitar Kutrovsky	3	5
WC	(Dominican Republic) José Hernández	6	7
(United Kingdom) Colin Fleming	3	6	5
(United States) Phillip Simmonds	6	2	7
(Slovenia) Luka Gregorc	3	6	6
6	(Australia) Peter Luczak	6	4	2

Second round
2	(United States) Michael Russell	6	6
WC	(Dominican Republic) José Hernández	1	4
(United States) Phillip Simmonds	3	4
(Slovenia) Luka Gregorc	6	6

Qualifying competition
2	(United States) Michael Russell	6	7^{7}
(Slovenia) Luka Gregorc	3	6^{1}

=== Third qualifier ===
First round
3	(Brazil) Ricardo Mello	6	6
(Czech Republic) František Čermák	1	1
WC	(United States) Robbye Poole	2	2
(United States) Jesse Levine	6	6
(United States) Michael McClune	7	7
(United States) Sekou Bangoura	5	5
(Canada) Pierre-Ludovic Duclos	3	6	6
8	(Canada) Érik Chvojka	6	2	1

Second round
3	(Brazil) Ricardo Mello	3	6	6
(United States) Jesse Levine	6	4	3
(United States) Michael McClune	6^{5}	6^{5}
(Canada) Pierre-Ludovic Duclos	7^{7}	7^{7}

Qualifying competition
3	(Brazil) Ricardo Mello	6	6
(Canada) Pierre-Ludovic Duclos	1	1

=== Fourth qualifier ===
First round
4	(France) Julien Benneteau	6	6
(Australia) Mark Verryth	1	4
(Czech Republic) Lukáš Dlouhý	3	4
(Haiti) Olivier Sajous	6	6
WC	(United States) Christian Harrison	6	6
(United States) William Boe-Wiegaard	0	4
WC	(United States) Hunter Harrington	2	1
5	(France) Édouard Roger-Vasselin	6	6

Second round
4	(France) Julien Benneteau	6	6
(Haiti) Olivier Sajous	3	4
WC	(United States) Christian Harrison	1	1
5	(France) Édouard Roger-Vasselin	6	6

Qualifying competition
4	(France) Julien Benneteau	6	6
5	(France) Édouard Roger-Vasselin	4	4
