= 2009 USTA Challenger of Oklahoma =

- Date: 14–20 September
- Edition: 1st
- Surface: Hard
- Location: Tulsa, Oklahoma, United States

Champions

Singles
- (United States) Taylor Dent

Doubles
- (United States) David Martin / (United States) Rajeev Ram
USTA Challenger of Oklahoma	· 2010 →

The 2009 USTA Challenger of Oklahoma was a professional tennis tournament played on outdoor hard courts. It was the first edition of the tournament which was part of the 2009 ATP Challenger Tour. It took place in Tulsa, Oklahoma, United States between 14 and 20 September 2009.

== Singles main-draw entrants ==
=== Seeds ===
Nationality	Player	Ranking*	Seeding
USA	Wayne Odesnik	86	1
USA	Rajeev Ram	114	2
USA	Brendan Evans	121	3
USA	Vince Spadea	130	4
USA	Jesse Levine	135	5
USA	Ryan Sweeting	141	6
USA	Taylor Dent	195	7
USA	Alex Kuznetsov	212	8

- Rankings are as of August 31, 2009.

=== Other entrants ===
The following players received wildcards into the singles main draw:

- (United States) Taylor Dent
- (United States) Austin Krajicek
- (United States) David Martin
- (United States) Blake Strode

The following players received entry from the qualifying draw:

- (Spain) Arnau Brugués Davi
- (Romania) Andrei Dăescu
- (Mexico) Daniel Garza
- (Ukraine) Oleksandr Nedovyesov

== Champions ==
=== Singles ===
(United States) Taylor Dent def. (United States) Wayne Odesnik, 7–6(9), 7–6(4)

=== Doubles ===
(United States) David Martin / (United States) Rajeev Ram def. (United Kingdom) Phillip Stephens / (United Kingdom) Ashley Watling, 6–2, 6–2
