= 2011 USTA Challenger of Oklahoma =

- Date: 12–18 September
- Edition: 3rd
- Surface: Hard
- Location: Tulsa, United States

Champions

Singles
- (United States) Bobby Reynolds

Doubles
- (United States) David Martin / (United States) Bobby Reynolds
- USTA Challenger of Oklahoma

The 2011 USTA Challenger of Oklahoma was a professional tennis tournament played on hard courts. It was the third edition of the tournament which was part of the 2011 ATP Challenger Tour. It took place in Tulsa, United States between 12 and 18 September 2011.

== Singles main-draw entrants ==
=== Seeds ===
Country	Player	Rank^{1}	Seed
USA	Sam Querrey	87	1
USA	Michael Russell	96	2
USA	Bobby Reynolds	118	3
USA	Wayne Odesnik	142	4
DOM	Víctor Estrella	214	5
USA	Rajeev Ram	226	6
USA	Tim Smyczek	234	7
USA	Alex Kuznetsov	242	8

- ^{1} Rankings are as of August 29, 2011.

=== Other entrants ===
The following players received wildcards into the singles main draw:

- (United States) Jeff Dadamo
- (United States) Michael Shabaz
- (Australia) John-Patrick Smith
- (United States) Jack Sock

The following players received entry from the qualifying draw:

- (Romania) Andrei Dăescu
- (United States) Michael McClune
- (Romania) Costin Pavăl
- (United States) Chris Wettengel

== Champions ==
=== Singles ===
(United States) Bobby Reynolds def. (United States) Michael McClune, 6–1, 6–3

=== Doubles ===
(United States) David Martin / (United States) Bobby Reynolds def. (United States) Sam Querrey / (United States) Chris Wettengel, 6–4, 6–2
