= 2011 Queen's Club Championships – Singles Qualifying =

This article displays the qualifying draw of the 2011 Queen's Club Championships.

== Players ==
=== Seeds ===
1. (United States) Bobby Reynolds
2. (Australia) Marinko Matosevic (qualifying competition)
3. (France) Arnaud Clément
4. (Australia) Matthew Ebden
5. (United States) Tim Smyczek (second round)
6. (Republic of Ireland) Conor Niland (qualifying competition)
7. (Serbia) Ilija Bozoljac
8. (South Africa) Fritz Wolmarans (second round)

=== Qualifiers ===
1. (United States) Bobby Reynolds
2. (Serbia) Ilija Bozoljac
3. (France) Arnaud Clément
4. (Australia) Matthew Ebden

== Qualifying draw ==
=== First qualifier ===
First Round
1	(United States) Bobby Reynolds	6	7^{7}
(Australia) Greg Jones	4	6^{4}
(United Kingdom) Joshua Goodall	6^{4}	7^{15}	3
(France) Kenny de Schepper	7^{7}	6^{13}	6
(France) Jonathan Eysseric	0	6^{6}
(United Kingdom) Alex Bogdanovic	6	7^{8}
(United States) Alex Kuznetsov	7^{7}	3	1
5	(United States) Tim Smyczek	6^{3}	6	6

Second Round
1	(United States) Bobby Reynolds	7^{7}	6
(France) Kenny de Schepper	6^{4}	3
(United Kingdom) Alex Bogdanovic	6	6
5	(United States) Tim Smyczek	4	4

Qualifying Competition
1	(United States) Bobby Reynolds	6	7^{7}
(United Kingdom) Alex Bogdanovic	4	6^{5}

=== Second qualifier ===
First Round
2	(Australia) Marinko Matosevic	4	6	6
(France) Olivier Patience	6	3	2
(United Kingdom) Chris Eaton	7^{7}	6
WC	(United Kingdom) James Feaver	6^{3}	2
(France) Fabrice Martin	6	7^{7}
(Sweden) Michael Ryderstedt	3	6^{2}
(Australia) Chris Guccione	6^{6}	6^{2}
7	(Serbia) Ilija Bozoljac	7^{8}	7^{7}

Second Round
2	(Australia) Marinko Matosevic	6	6
(United Kingdom) Chris Eaton	2	1
(France) Fabrice Martin	6^{4}	3
7	(Serbia) Ilija Bozoljac	7^{7}	6

Qualifying Competition
2	(Australia) Marinko Matosevic	4	7^{7}	3
7	(Serbia) Ilija Bozoljac	6	6^{4}	6

=== Third qualifier ===
First Round
3	(France) Arnaud Clément	6	3	7^{7}
(United States) Rajeev Ram	3	6	6^{3}
WC	(United Kingdom) George Morgan	6	7^{9}
WC	(United Kingdom) Sean Thornley	1	6^{7}
(Brazil) Tiago Fernandes	4^{r}
(United States) Nicholas Monroe	6
(United Kingdom) Morgan Phillips	6	5	4
8	(South Africa) Fritz Wolmarans	4	7	6

Second Round
3	(France) Arnaud Clément	6	7
WC	(United Kingdom) George Morgan	1	6^{5}
(United States) Nicholas Monroe	7^{7}	6^{4}	7^{7}
8	(South Africa) Fritz Wolmarans	6^{5}	7^{7}	6^{4}

Qualifying Competition
3	(France) Arnaud Clément	6	6
(United States) Nicholas Monroe	3	4

=== Fourth qualifier ===
First Round
4	(Australia) Matthew Ebden	6	6^{1}	6
(Australia) Michael Look	4	7^{7}	3
WC	(United Kingdom) Marcus Willis	3	7^{7}	6
(Australia) Benjamin Mitchell	6	6^{5}	2
(Mexico) Santiago González	6	6
(United States) Jordan Cox	4	0
(United States) Denis Kudla	6	2	4
6	(Republic of Ireland) Conor Niland	3	6	6

Second Round
4	(Australia) Matthew Ebden	6	6
WC	(United Kingdom) Marcus Willis	2	3
(Mexico) Santiago González	6	6^{5}	3
6	(Republic of Ireland) Conor Niland	1	7^{7}	6

Qualifying Competition
4	(Australia) Matthew Ebden	4	7^{7}	7^{8}
6	(Republic of Ireland) Conor Niland	6	6^{4}	6^{6}
