= 2011 Regions Morgan Keegan Championships – Singles qualifying =

Tennis tournament)

This article displays the qualifying draw of the 2011 Regions Morgan Keegan Championships.

== Players ==
=== Seeds ===
1. (Japan) Kei Nishikori (qualifying round)
2. (Germany) Björn Phau (qualifying round)
3. (Russia) Igor Kunitsyn (qualifying round)
4. (Germany) Dustin Brown (qualifying round)
5. (United States) Michael Russell (qualified)
6. (Czech Republic) Jan Hájek (qualified)
7. (United States) Robert Kendrick (qualified)
8. (United States) Ryan Sweeting (qualified)

=== Qualifiers ===
1. (Czech Republic) Jan Hájek
2. (United States) Ryan Sweeting
3. (United States) Robert Kendrick
4. (United States) Michael Russell

== Qualifying draw ==
=== First qualifier ===
First round
1	(Japan) Kei Nishikori	2	6	6
(United States) Alex Bogomolov Jr.	6	4	3
WC	(United States) Blake Strode	0	2
6	(Czech Republic) Jan Hájek	6	6

Qualifying round
1	(Japan) Kei Nishikori	3	1
6	(Czech Republic) Jan Hájek	6	6

=== Second qualifier ===
First round
2	(Germany) Björn Phau	7	3	6
(United States) Ryan Harrison	5	6	3
WC	(United Kingdom) Joe Salisbury	1	3
8	(United States) Ryan Sweeting	6	6

Qualifying round
2	(Germany) Björn Phau	6	1	6^{3}
8	(United States) Ryan Sweeting	3	6	7

=== Third qualifier ===
First round
3	(Russia) Igor Kunitsyn	6	6
(United States) Donald Young	1	3
(United States) Bobby Reynolds	6^{4}	6	3
7	(United States) Robert Kendrick	7	3	6

Qualifying round
3	(Russia) Igor Kunitsyn	3	4
7	(United States) Robert Kendrick	6	6

=== Fourth qualifier ===
First round
4	(Germany) Dustin Brown	7	6
WC	(United States) Jordan Cox	6^{5}	2
(United States) Tim Smyczek	1^{r}
5	(United States) Michael Russell	1

Qualifying round
4	(Germany) Dustin Brown	2	0
5	(United States) Michael Russell	6	6
