= USTA Challenger of Oklahoma =

Defunct tennis tournament
- Event name: USTA Challenger of Oklahoma
- Location: Tulsa, United States
- Category: ATP Challenger Tour
- Surface: Hard
- Draw: 32S/32Q/16D
- Prize money: €50,000
- Website: http://www.philcresthills.com

The USTA Challenger of Oklahoma was a professional tennis tournament played on outdoor hardcourts. It was part of the ATP Challenger Tour. It was held annually in Tulsa, United States from 1999 until 2011.

== Past finals ==
=== Singles ===
Year	Champion	Runner-up	Score
2011	(United States) Bobby Reynolds	(United States) Michael McClune	6–1, 6–3
2010	(United States) Bobby Reynolds	(United States) Lester Cook	6–3, 6–3
2009	(United States) Taylor Dent	(United States) Wayne Odesnik	7–6^{(11–9)}, 7–6^{(7–4)}
2008	(United States) Kevin Kim	(United States) Vince Spadea	6–3, 3–6, 6–4
2007	(United States) Jesse Witten	(United States) Donald Young	7–6^{(10–8)}, 7–5
2006	(United States) Bobby Reynolds	(United States) Michael Russell	7–6^{(7–3)}, 6–3
2005	(Israel) Harel Levy	(Germany) Benedikt Dorsch	5–7, 7–5, 7–6^{(8–6)}
2003–2004	Not held		
2002	(United States) Robert Kendrick	(Brazil) Daniel Melo	6–3, 6–3
2001	(Czech Republic) Jan Hernych	(United States) Vince Spadea	7–5, 7–5
2000	(Venezuela) Jimy Szymanski	(Netherlands) Raemon Sluiter	7–6^{(7–5)}, 6–7^{(5–7)}, 7–6^{(7–3)}
1999	(Brazil) André Sá	(Venezuela) Jimy Szymanski	6–2, 7–6

=== Doubles ===
Year	Champions	Runners-up	Score
2011	(United States) David Martin (United States) Bobby Reynolds	(United States) Sam Querrey (United States) Chris Wettengel	6–4, 6–2
2010	(South Africa) Andrew Anderson (South Africa) Fritz Wolmarans	(United States) Brett Joelson (Canada) Chris Klingemann	6–2, 6–3
2009	(United States) David Martin (United States) Rajeev Ram	(United Kingdom) Phillip Stephens (United Kingdom) Ashley Watling	6–2, 6–2
2008	(Australia) Ashley Fisher (Australia) Stephen Huss	(United States) Rajeev Ram (United States) Bobby Reynolds	7–6^{(7–4)}, 6–3
2007	(United States) Rajeev Ram (United States) Bobby Reynolds	(United States) Alex Bogomolov Jr. (United States) Brian Wilson	6–4, 6–2
2006	(United States) Rajeev Ram (United States) Bobby Reynolds	(United States) Scott Lipsky (United States) David Martin	6–4, 6–4
2005	(United States) Scott Lipsky (United States) David Martin	(South Africa) Rik de Voest (Israel) Harel Levy	6–4, 6–4
2003–2004	Not held		
2002	(United States) Scott Humphries (The Bahamas) Mark Merklein	(United States) Diego Ayala (United States) Jason Marshall	7–6^{(7–1)}, 6–4
2001	(United States) Mardy Fish (United States) Jeff Morrison	(South Africa) Jeff Coetzee (South Africa) Shaun Rudman	6–2, 6–3
2000	(Mexico) Enrique Abaroa (United States) Michael Sell	(Romania) Gabriel Trifu (United States) Glenn Weiner	5–7, 6–4, 6–2
1999	(South Africa) Jeff Coetzee (Mexico) Alejandro Hernández	(United States) James Blake (United States) Thomas Blake	6–2, 6–1
