= 2010 Australian Open – Men's singles qualifying =

Men's singles qualifying
- 2010 Australian Open

Events
Singles	men	women		boys	girls
Doubles	men	women	mixed	boys	girls
WC Singles	men	women	quad
WC Doubles	men	women	quad
Legends	men	women	mixed

Qualification
Singles	men	women
- Australian Open

== Seeds ==
1. (Belgium) Xavier Malisse (qualifier)
2. (France) Stéphane Robert (moved to main draw)
3. (Belgium) Steve Darcis (qualifying competition)
4. (Spain) Santiago Ventura (qualifying competition)
5. (United States) Kevin Kim (second round)
6. (Israel) Harel Levy (first round)
7. (Slovakia) Karol Beck (first round)
8. (Germany) Björn Phau (second round)
9. (Ukraine) Illya Marchenko (qualifier)
10. (Portugal) Rui Machado (second round)
11. (Ukraine) Oleksandr Dolgopolov Jr. (first round)
12. (Slovenia) Blaž Kavčič (qualifier)
13. (France) Josselin Ouanna (qualifying competition)
14. (France) David Guez (qualifier)
15. (Austria) Stefan Koubek (qualifier)
16. (France) Laurent Recouderc (second round)
17. (United States) Robert Kendrick (second round)
18. (France) Sébastien de Chaunac (first round)
19. (Jamaica) Dustin Brown (second round)
20. (Chile) Paul Capdeville (first round)
21. (South Africa) Kevin Anderson (qualifier)
22. (Italy) Flavio Cipolla (first round)
23. (France) Thierry Ascione (second round)
24. (Turkey) Marsel İlhan (qualifying competition, lucky loser)
25. (France) Édouard Roger-Vasselin (qualifying competition)
26. (United States) Michael Yani (second round)
27. (India) Somdev Devvarman (qualifying competition)
28. (United States) Jesse Witten (second round)
29. (Spain) Albert Ramos-Viñolas (first round)
30. (Thailand) Danai Udomchoke (first round)
31. (United States) Brendan Evans (first round)
32. (Slovenia) Grega Žemlja (qualifier)

== Qualifiers ==
1. (Belgium) Xavier Malisse
2. (Australia) Matthew Ebden
3. (Slovenia) Grega Žemlja
4. (Croatia) Antonio Veić
5. (Republic of Ireland) Louk Sorensen
6. (France) Guillaume Rufin
7. (Brazil) Ricardo Hocevar
8. (United States) Donald Young
9. (Ukraine) Illya Marchenko
10. (Ukraine) Ivan Sergeyev
11. (South Africa) Kevin Anderson
12. (Slovenia) Blaž Kavčič
13. (Croatia) Ivan Dodig
14. (France) David Guez
15. (Austria) Stefan Koubek
16. (Germany) Dieter Kindlmann

=== Lucky losers ===
1. (Turkey) Marsel İlhan

== Qualifying draw ==
Key

- Q = Qualifier
- WC = Wild card
- LL = Lucky loser
- Alt = Alternate
- ITF = ITF entry
- PR = Protected ranking
- SR = Special ranking
- SE = Special exempt
- JE = Junior exempt
- JR = Junior Accelerator Programme entrant
- CO = College Accelerator Programme entrant
- NG = Next Gen Accelerator Program entrant
- w/o = Walkover
- r = Retired
- d = Defaulted

=== First qualifier ===
First round
1	(Belgium) Xavier Malisse	6	7
(United States) Alex Kuznetsov	2	6^{5}
(Germany) Julian Reister	2	7	3
(Austria) Martin Fischer	6	6^{3}	6
(Czech Republic) Dušan Lojda	6	3	2
(South Africa) Rik de Voest	3	6	6
(Netherlands) Igor Sijsling	6	6
22	(Italy) Flavio Cipolla	2	2

Second round
1	(Belgium) Xavier Malisse	7	7
(Austria) Martin Fischer	5	6^{3}
(South Africa) Rik de Voest	6	6
(Netherlands) Igor Sijsling	0	2

Qualifying competition
1	(Belgium) Xavier Malisse	6	4	7
(South Africa) Rik de Voest	1	6	5

=== Second qualifier ===
First round
PR/Alt	(Australia) Colin Ebelthite	0	4
(Spain) Adrián Menéndez-Maceiras	6	6
(Spain) Carles Poch-Gradin	2	1
(Australia) Matthew Ebden	6	6
(Poland) Michał Przysiężny	6	6
(Tunisia) Malek Jaziri	3	4
(Israel) Noam Okun	6	6^{8}	6
20	(Chile) Paul Capdeville	4	7	4

Second round
(Spain) Adrián Menéndez-Maceiras	4	6	5
(Australia) Matthew Ebden	6	1	7
(Poland) Michał Przysiężny	2	7	6
(Israel) Noam Okun	6	5	1

Qualifying competition
(Australia) Matthew Ebden	7	6
(Poland) Michał Przysiężny	5	2

=== Third qualifier ===
First round
3	(Belgium) Steve Darcis	6	6
WC	(Australia) James Lemke	1	2
(South Africa) Izak van der Merwe	6	4	6
(Croatia) Nikola Mektic	3	6	0
(France) Nicolas Devilder	6	6
(Japan) Tatsuma Ito	2	3
(United States) Lester Cook	6^{4}	4
32	(Slovenia) Grega Žemlja	7	6

Second round
3	(Belgium) Steve Darcis	6	6
(South Africa) Izak van der Merwe	2	0
(France) Nicolas Devilder	3	3
32	(Slovenia) Grega Žemlja	6	6

Qualifying competition
3	(Belgium) Steve Darcis	6	3	8
32	(Slovenia) Grega Žemlja	1	6	10

=== Fourth qualifier ===
First round
4	(Spain) Santiago Ventura	6	6
(Germany) Denis Gremelmayr	1	4
(United Kingdom) Daniel Evans	7	6
WC	(Australia) Sean Berman	5	1
(Germany) Lars Poerschke	7	6^{4}	8
(Spain) Iñigo Cervantes-Huegun	6^{5}	7	6
(Croatia) Antonio Veić	6	6
29	(Spain) Albert Ramos-Viñolas	4	3

Second round
4	(Spain) Santiago Ventura	6	6
(United Kingdom) Daniel Evans	1	2
(Germany) Lars Poerschke	6	4	3
(Croatia) Antonio Veić	4	6	6

Qualifying competition
4	(Spain) Santiago Ventura	2	6^{0}
(Croatia) Antonio Veić	6	7

=== Fifth qualifier ===
First round
5	(United States) Kevin Kim	6	6
WC	(Australia) Kaden Hensel	4	4
(United States) Todd Widom	4	4
(New Zealand) Daniel King-Turner	6	6
(Monaco) Benjamin Balleret	6^{6}	3
(Republic of Ireland) Louk Sorensen	7	6
(Ukraine) Sergei Bubka	3	6	11
26	(United States) Michael Yani	6	2	13

Second round
5	(United States) Kevin Kim	4	3
(New Zealand) Daniel King-Turner	6	6
(Republic of Ireland) Louk Sorensen	6	3	6
26	(United States) Michael Yani	4	6	3

Qualifying competition
(New Zealand) Daniel King-Turner	4	6^{3}
(Republic of Ireland) Louk Sorensen	6	7

=== Sixth qualifier ===
First round
6	(Israel) Harel Levy	4	4
(Spain) Roberto Bautista-Agut	6	6
WC	(Australia) Luke Saville	1	1
(France) Alexandre Sidorenko	6	6
(France) Guillaume Rufin	6^{4}	4
(Austria) Andreas Haider-Maurer	7	6
(Slovakia) Ivo Klec	5	6^{2}
19	(Jamaica) Dustin Brown	7	7

Second round
(Spain) Roberto Bautista-Agut	6	6
(France) Alexandre Sidorenko	3	3
(France) Guillaume Rufin	7	6^{7}	6
19	(Jamaica) Dustin Brown	6^{1}	7	4

Qualifying competition
(Spain) Roberto Bautista-Agut	6	3	4
(France) Guillaume Rufin	4	6	6

=== Seventh qualifier ===
First round
7	(Slovakia) Karol Beck	4	6	5
(Germany) Matthias Bachinger	6	3	7
(Brazil) Ricardo Hocevar	6	6
(Russia) Evgeny Kirillov	4	4
(Finland) Henri Kontinen	4	4
(Republic of Ireland) Conor Niland	6	6
(Spain) José Checa Calvo	5	6^{2}
28	(United States) Jesse Witten	7	7

Second round
(Germany) Matthias Bachinger	4	6	5
(Brazil) Ricardo Hocevar	6	2	7
(Republic of Ireland) Conor Niland	2	6	6
28	(United States) Jesse Witten	6	1	4

Qualifying competition
(Brazil) Ricardo Hocevar	1	6	6
(Republic of Ireland) Conor Niland	6	4	3

=== Eighth qualifier ===
First round
8	(Germany) Björn Phau	4	7	6
(Argentina) Federico Delbonis	6	5	4
(Spain) Marc López	5	0
(United States) Donald Young	7	6
(Australia) Samuel Groth	6^{8}	4
(Paraguay) Ramón Delgado	7	6
(Japan) Takao Suzuki	7	6
30	(Thailand) Danai Udomchoke	5	4

Second round
(Germany) Björn Phau	5	3
(United States) Donald Young	7	6
(Paraguay) Ramón Delgado	6	6^{4}	4
(Japan) Takao Suzuki	3	7	6

Qualifying competition
(United States) Donald Young	7	7
(Japan) Takao Suzuki	6^{0}	6^{2}

=== Ninth qualifier ===
First round
9	(Ukraine) Illya Marchenko	6^{9}	6	6
(France) Jonathan Dasnières de Veigy	7	2	2
(United Kingdom) James Ward	6	6
WC	(Australia) Matt Reid	4	4
(Australia) John Millman	6	6
(Italy) Simone Vagnozzi	3	2
(Austria) Philipp Oswald	4	6	7
31	(United States) Brendan Evans	6	3	5

Second round
9	(Ukraine) Illya Marchenko	6	6
(United Kingdom) James Ward	3	4
(Australia) John Millman	6	3	7
(Austria) Philipp Oswald	2	6	5

Qualifying competition
9	(Ukraine) Illya Marchenko	6	6
(Australia) John Millman	2	1

=== Tenth qualifier ===
First round
10	(Portugal) Rui Machado	7	6
(Australia) Brydan Klein	5	2
(United States) Alex Bogomolov Jr.	7	6
(Slovakia) Pavol Červenák	5	3
(Ukraine) Ivan Sergeyev	3	6	6
(Australia) Greg Jones	6	4	3
(Russia) Konstantin Kravchuk	1	2
23	(France) Thierry Ascione	6	6

Second round
10	(Portugal) Rui Machado	3	5
(United States) Alex Bogomolov Jr.	6	7
(Ukraine) Ivan Sergeyev	6	6
23	(France) Thierry Ascione	4	4

Qualifying competition
(United States) Alex Bogomolov Jr.	6^{10}	3
(Ukraine) Ivan Sergeyev	7	6

=== Eleventh qualifier ===
First round
11	(Ukraine) Oleksandr Dolgopolov Jr.	2	6	6
(Germany) Simon Stadler	6	3	8
(Spain) Pedro Clar-Rosselló	3	2
(Croatia) Roko Karanušić	6	6
(Italy) Andrea Stoppini	6	7
(Slovakia) Martin Kližan	4	6^{5}
(Spain) Guillermo Olaso	3	4
21	(South Africa) Kevin Anderson	6	6

Second round
(Germany) Simon Stadler	6	6
(Croatia) Roko Karanušić	2	0
(Italy) Andrea Stoppini	4	4
21	(South Africa) Kevin Anderson	6	6

Qualifying competition
(Germany) Simon Stadler	2	4
21	(South Africa) Kevin Anderson	6	6

=== Twelfth qualifier ===
First round
12	(Slovenia) Blaž Kavčič	6^{4}	6	6
(Japan) Go Soeda	7	4	4
(Serbia) Ilija Bozoljac	4	6	3
(Montenegro) Goran Tošić	6	0	6
(Italy) Riccardo Ghedin	4	6	2
(Germany) Tobias Kamke	6	4	6
WC	(Australia) James Duckworth	2	1
27	(India) Somdev Devvarman	6	6

Second round
12	(Slovenia) Blaž Kavčič	6	6
(Montenegro) Goran Tošić	2	2
(Germany) Tobias Kamke	6	1	6
27	(India) Somdev Devvarman	2	6	8

Qualifying competition
12	(Slovenia) Blaž Kavčič	6	7
27	(India) Somdev Devvarman	3	6^{4}

=== Thirteenth qualifier ===
First round
13	(France) Josselin Ouanna	3	6	2
WC	(Australia) Joseph Sirianni	6	3	6
(India) Yuki Bhambri	6	3	3
(Czech Republic) Jan Minář	3	6	6
WC	(Australia) Benjamin Mitchell	2	2
(Italy) Andrea Arnaboldi	6	6
(Croatia) Ivan Dodig	6	6
18	(France) Sébastien de Chaunac	4	2

Second round
WC	(Australia) Joseph Sirianni	1	7	6
(Czech Republic) Jan Minář	6	5	4
(Italy) Andrea Arnaboldi	3	6^{5}
(Croatia) Ivan Dodig	6	7

Qualifying competition
WC	(Australia) Joseph Sirianni	6^{2}	2
(Croatia) Ivan Dodig	7	6

=== Fourteenth qualifier ===
First round
14	(France) David Guez	6	4	6
(Belgium) Ruben Bemelmans	4	6	1
(Egypt) Karim Maamoun	7	4	5
WC	(Australia) Dayne Kelly	6^{0}	6	7
(Germany) Andre Begemann	6	1	3
(India) Prakash Amritraj	4	6	6
(France) Vincent Millot	7	4	2
25	(France) Édouard Roger-Vasselin	5	6	6

Second round
14	(France) David Guez	6	6
WC	(Australia) Dayne Kelly	2	4
(India) Prakash Amritraj	5	4
25	(France) Édouard Roger-Vasselin	7	6

Qualifying competition
14	(France) David Guez	6	4	9
25	(France) Édouard Roger-Vasselin	1	6	7

=== Fifteenth qualifier ===
First round
15	(Austria) Stefan Koubek	7	6
(United States) Ryler DeHeart	5	4
(South Korea) Im Kyu-tae	6	7
(Italy) Marco Crugnola	2	6^{4}
(United States) Ryan Sweeting	2	6	6
(Japan) Yuichi Sugita	6	3	4
(Bulgaria) Grigor Dimitrov	6^{4}	6	3
17	(United States) Robert Kendrick	7	3	6

Second round
15	(Austria) Stefan Koubek	6	7
(South Korea) Im Kyu-tae	3	5
(United States) Ryan Sweeting	7	6
17	(United States) Robert Kendrick	6^{3}	4

Qualifying competition
15	(Austria) Stefan Koubek	6	6^{5}	9
(United States) Ryan Sweeting	4	7	7

=== Sixteenth qualifier ===
First round
16	(France) Laurent Recouderc	6	0
(Morocco) Reda El Amrani	4	3^{r}
(Germany) Dieter Kindlmann	6	6
PR	(Spain) Pablo Santos	2	1
(United Kingdom) Alex Bogdanovic	6	6
PR	(Austria) Martin Slanar	4	3
(Canada) Peter Polansky	1	2
24	(Turkey) Marsel İlhan	6	6

Second round
16	(France) Laurent Recouderc	6	4	9
(Germany) Dieter Kindlmann	2	6	11
(United Kingdom) Alex Bogdanovic	4	4
24	(Turkey) Marsel İlhan	6	6

Qualifying competition
(Germany) Dieter Kindlmann	7	1	11
24	(Turkey) Marsel İlhan	5	6	9
