= Tigran Martirosyan (tennis) =

Armenian tennis player

- Full name: Tigran Martirosyan
- Country (sports): Armenia
- Born: 12 July 1983 (age 41); Meghri, Armenia
- Plays: Right-handed
- Prize money: $30,558

Singles
- Career record: 0–2
- Highest ranking: No. 361 (20 July 2009)

Doubles
- Highest ranking: No. 425 (7 December 2009)

Tigran Martirosyan (Armenian: Տիգրան Մարտիրոսյան; born 12 July 1983) is an Armenian tennis player who rose in the ATP tennis rankings of top players during 2008.

== Career ==
=== 2001 ===
Tigran played his only Davis Cup tennis to date in 2001, losing a singles rubber in each of two ties.

=== 2006 ===
It was not until 2006 however that he played his first Futures tournaments, starting with the USA F17, where he reached the quarter finals. He only played one more tournament in 2006, the Lexington Challenger, where he again made the quarters.

=== 2007 ===
Tigran hardly raised his ranking at all in 2007 but played fairly well. He started the year ranked 788 and ended it ranked 776. He reached two futures semi-finals and three quarter-finals.

=== 2008 ===
2008 was Tigran's best year by far. He started off very badly, losing to Ytai Abougzir 3–6, 5–7 in the first round of USA F15. His ranking dropped down to zero before he reached the quarter-final of USA F16. He lost in another first round before winning his first ever tournament beating Jean-Yves Aubone 6–3, 5–7, 6–0 in the final. In August he reached the second qualifying round for New Heaven, losing 3–6, 2–6 to Vince Spadea. He won another tournament in September to increase his ranking to 679. The best result he got in the rest of the season was reaching the final at USA F28 before losing 5–7, 4–6 to Daniel Yoo. Tigran finished the year ranked number 469 in the world.

=== 2009 ===
Tigran won two futures doubles titles in USA F1 & F3 with Uladzimir Ignatik and Jesse Witten respectively. Tigran started his singles year with a 3–6, 6–4, 7–5 win over American teenager Robert Johannes van Overbeek. He was then shocked in the second round by Andrei Ciumac of Moldova 0–6, 4–6. He is currently ranked 462 in ATP rankings for singles.
