= Lester Cook =

American tennis player

- Country (sports): United States
- Residence: Ojai, CA, United States
- Born: April 24, 1984 (age 42) Calabasas, California
- Height: 5 ft 11 in (1.80 m)
- Plays: Right-handed

Singles
- Career record: 0–1 (ATP, Grand Slam, Davis Cup)
- Career titles: 0
- Highest ranking: No. 191 (25 October 2010)

Grand Slam singles results
- Australian Open: Q1 (2010)
- French Open: Q1 (2010)
- Wimbledon: Q1 (2010, 2011)
- US Open: Q1 (2007, 2009, 2010)

Doubles
- Career record: 0-2 (ATP, Grand Slam, Davis Cup)
- Career titles: 0
- Highest ranking: 175 (18 January 2010)
- Last updated on: 21 June 2021.

Lester Cook (born April 24, 1984) is an American former professional tennis player.

As a junior, he was top 5 in the country in the 18 and under division, finishing 4th place at the prestigious Kalamazoo Hard Court Nationals and 3rd in the International Grass Court and International Hard Court championships that same year. At 16, he competed in the French Open, U.S. Open, Australian Open, and the Orange Bowl, proudly earning 6 National Sportsmanship awards along the way.

A year later Lester entered college at 17, pursuing a degree in Economics at Texas A&M University in College Station, TX. In his 3 years at Texas A&M under the tutelage of Tim Cass, Lester was a 3 time All-American finishing with a career high ITA ranking of No. 6 in singles and No. 1 in doubles with partner Ante Matijevic. After his junior year, Lester was one of six players asked to represent the U.S. Collegiate All-star Team in a scrimmage match against the Chinese National team.

In 2005, Lester left college and turned pro. In his 6 years on tour, Lester had the privilege of traveling to over 30 countries and 31 states following his dream of being the best tennis player in the world. Along the way he won 8 professional singles titles as well as 18 professional doubles titles reaching a career high ranking of No. 191 in singles and No. 175 in doubles. He competed in all 4 grand slams as a professional and also participated in 3 World Team Tennis seasons, being drafted by the Delaware Smash and Newport Beach Breakers twice.

He won the men's singles in the Ojai Tennis Tournament in 2007, 2009, and 2010.

At the end of 2011, Lester retired from the tour and was focused on building a career in real estate. In 2014 he married his girlfriend of five years, Katie. They have two children and live in Ojai, CA with their many rescue animals including horses, goats, dogs, and a hamster. Lester currently works in real estate in both Los Angeles and Ventura County.

== Coaching career ==
- Teaching pro at Malibu Racquet Club starting September 2013

- USTA high performance coach for Jr Davis Cup Team Feb 2014

- Hitting Partner for Sloane Stephens July–December 2014

After retiring from professional tennis, Cook because a real estates agent in Ojai, starting his own (self-named) agency.

== ATP Challenger and ITF Futures finals ==
=== Singles: 10 (7–3) ===
Legend ATP Challenger (0–1) ITF Futures (7–2)	Finals by surface Hard (6–2) Clay (0–1) Grass (0–0) Carpet (1–0)

Result	W–L	Date	Tournament	Tier	Surface	Opponent	Score
Win	1–0	Jun 2006	Thailand F1, Bangkok	Futures	Hard	(South Korea) Hyung-Kwon Kim]	6–3, 6–1
Win	2–0	Sep 2006	Mexico F14, Monterrey	Futures	Hard	(Mexico) Miguel Gallardo-Valles	7–6^{(7–3)}, 4–6, 7–6^{(7–2)}
Loss	2–1	Feb 2007	Costa Rica F1, San José	Futures	Hard	(Canada) Peter Polansky	6–2, 5–7, 3–6
Win	3–1	Jun 2007	Japan F6, Kusatsu	Futures	Carpet	(Japan) Takahiro Terachi	6–3, 2–6, 6–4
Win	4–1	Oct 2007	USA F25, Laguna Niguel	Futures	Hard	(United States) Nikita Kryvonos	6–2, 6–3
Win	5–1	Nov 2007	USA F28, Waikolu	Futures	Hard	(Australia) Carsten Ball	5–7, 7–6^{(7–2)}, 6–3
Win	6–1	Oct 2008	USA F25, Laguna Niguel	Futures	Hard	(Denmark) Martin Pedersen	6–2, 6–2
Win	7–1	Mar 2009	USA F6, McAllen	Futures	Hard	(Russia) Andrey Kumantsov	1–6, 6–2, 4–0 ret.
Loss	7–2	Sep 2010	Tulsa, United States	Challenger	Hard	(United States) Bobby Reynolds	3–6, 3–6
Loss	7–3	May 2011	USA F12, Tampa	Futures	Clay	(United States) Blake Strode	3–6, 4–6

=== Doubles: 19 (13–6) ===
Legend ATP Challenger (2–2) ITF Futures (11–4)	Finals by surface Hard (11–5) Clay (1–1) Grass (0–0) Carpet (1–0)

Result	W–L	Date	Tournament	Tier	Surface	Partner	Opponents	Score
Win	1–0	Dec 2002	USA F30, Laguna Niguel	Futures	Hard	(United States) Jason Cook	(United States) Brandon Hawk (United States) Huntley Montgomery	6–2, 6–4
Win	2–0	Jun 2003	USA F14, Sunnyvale	Futures	Hard	(United States) Ryan Newport	(United States) Brian Wilson (United States) Nick Rainey	2–6, 6–3, 6–1
Win	3–0	Jul 2004	USA F16, Chico	Futures	Hard	(United States) Jason Cook	(United States) Sam Warburg (United States) KC Corkery	7–5, 7–6^{(7–5)}
Win	4–0	Feb 2005	USA F4, Brownsville	Futures	Hard	(Canada) Rob Steckley	(United States) Tres Davis (United States) Eric Nunez	walkover
Loss	4–1	Oct 2005	USA F25, Laguna Niguel	Futures	Hard	(Canada) Rob Steckley	(Canada) Philip Gubenco (Canada) Erik Chvojka	6–7^{(4–7)}, 6–4, 1–6
Loss	4–2	Jun 2006	Thailand F1, Bangkok	Futures	Hard	(Canada) Rob Steckley	(Colombia) Rubén Torres (South Africa) Izak Van Der Merwe	4–6, 3–6
Loss	4–3	Aug 2006	Mexico F13, Monterrey	Futures	Clay	(United States) Shane La Porte	(Mexico) Miguel Gallardo-Valles (Mexico) Carlos Palencia	3–6, 4–6
Win	5–3	Sep 2006	Mexico F14, Monterrey	Futures	Hard	(United States) Shane La Porte	(Chile) Jorge Aguilar (Mexico) Daniel Garza	6–3, 6–4
Win	6–3	Jun 2007	Guatemala F1, Guatemala City	Futures	Hard	(United States) Shane La Porte	(Mexico) Miguel Gallardo-Valles (Mexico) Carlos Palencia	6–3, 7–5
Win	7–3	Jun 2007	Japan F6, Kusatsu	Futures	Carpet	(United States) Shane La Porte	(Japan) Hiroyasu Sato (Japan) Joji Miyao	4–6, 6–4, 7–6^{(7–1)}
Win	8–3	Nov 2007	USA F28, Waikolu	Futures	Hard	(United States) Shane La Porte	(Australia) Carsten Ball (United States) Rylan Rizza	6–2, 6–3
Loss	8–4	Apr 2008	Humacao, Puerto Rico	Challenger	Hard	(United States) Kevin Kim	(United States) Bobby Reynolds (United States) Rajeev Ram	3–6, 4–6
Win	9–4	May 2008	Bradenton, United States	Challenger	Clay	(Australia) Carsten Ball	(United States) Ryler Deheart (United States) Todd Widom	4–6, 6–3, [10–6]
Loss	9–5	Feb 2009	Carson, United States	Challenger	Hard	(United States) Donald Young	(United States) Scott Lipsky (United States) David Martin	6–7^{(3–7)}, 6–4, [6–10]
Win	10–5	Feb 2009	USA F4, Brownsville	Futures	Hard	(United States) Shane La Porte	(Armenia) Tigran Martirosyan (United States) Jesse Witten	6–1, 7–5
Loss	10–6	Apr 2009	USA F7, Mobile	Futures	Hard	(Philippines) Treat Huey	(Canada) Milos Raonic (Canada) Philip Bester	3–6, 6–1, [5–10]
Win	11–6	Jun 2009	USA F13, Sacramento	Futures	Hard	(Philippines) Treat Huey	(Australia) Andrew Coelho (Australia) Adam Feeney	6–4, 3–6, [10–2]
Win	12–6	Oct 2009	Sacramento, United States	Challenger	Hard	(United States) David Martin	(Mexico) Santiago Gonzalez (United States) Travis Rettenmaier	4–6, 6–3, [10–5]
Win	13–6	Apr 2010	USA F9, Little Rock	Futures	Hard	(United States) Brett Joelson	(Australia) Brydan Klein (Australia) John Millman	6–4, 3–6, [10–7]

== Performance timeline ==
Key
W	F	SF	QF	#R	RR	Q#	DNQ	A	NH

(W) winner; (F) finalist; (SF) semifinalist; (QF) quarterfinalist; (#R) rounds 4, 3, 2, 1; (RR) round-robin stage; (Q#) qualification round; (DNQ) did not qualify; (A) absent; (NH) not held; (SR) strike rate (events won / competed); (W–L) win–loss record.

=== Singles ===
Tournament	2007	2008	2009	2010	2011	SR	W–L	Win %
Grand Slam tournaments
Australian Open	A	A	A	Q1	A	0 / 0	0–0	–
French Open	A	A	A	Q1	A	0 / 0	0–0	–
Wimbledon	A	A	A	Q1	Q1	0 / 0	0–0	–
US Open	Q1	A	Q1	Q1	A	0 / 0	0–0	–
Win–loss	0–0	0–0	0–0	0–0	0–0	0 / 0	0–0	–
ATP Tour Masters 1000
Indian Wells Masters	A	A	Q1	Q2	Q1	0 / 0	0–0	–
Win–loss	0–0	0–0	0–0	0–0	0–0	0 / 0	0–0	–
