= Wayne Odesnik =

American tennis player (born 1985)

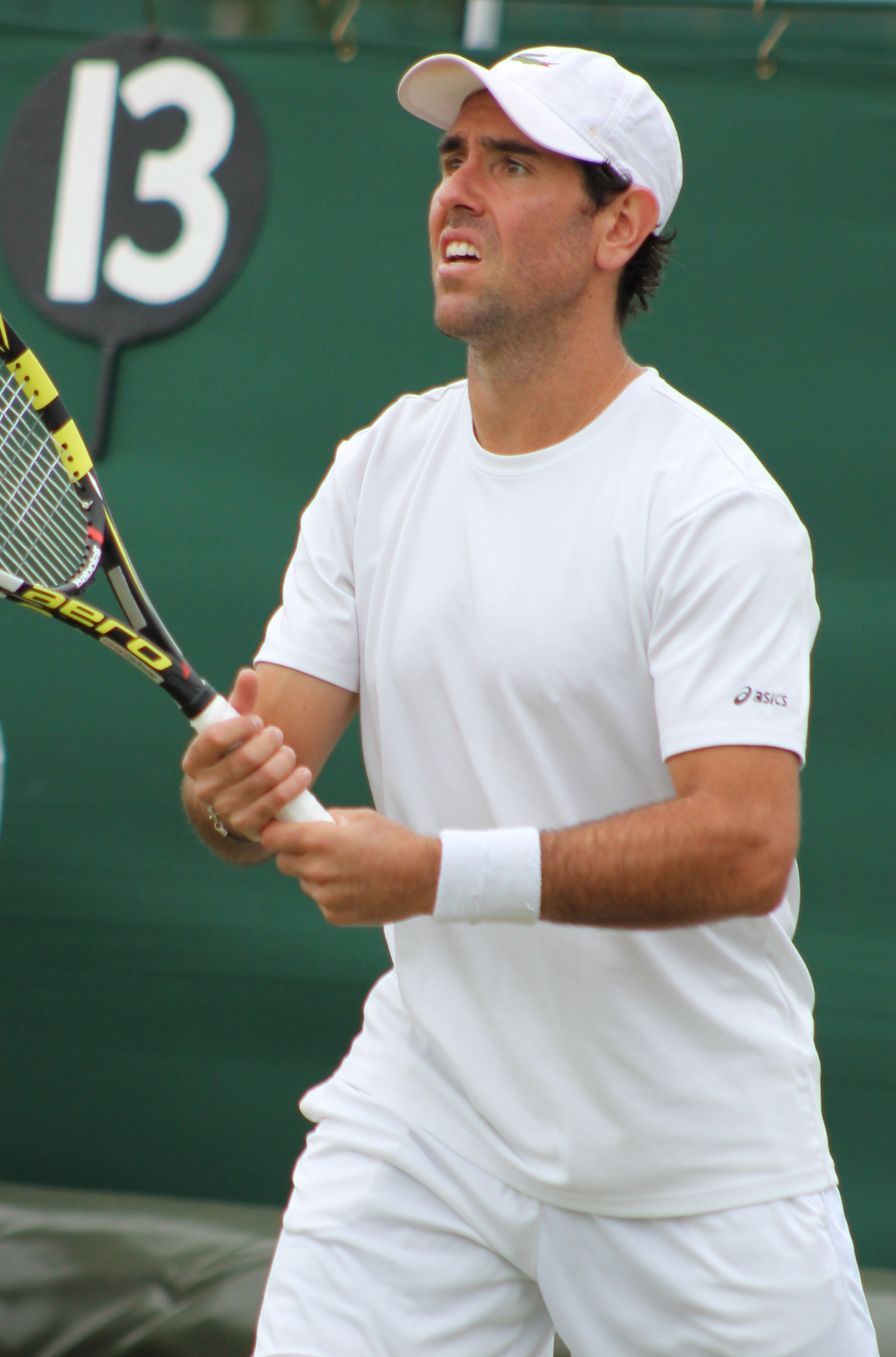
- Country (sports): United States
- Residence: Weston, Florida, United States
- Born: November 21, 1985 (age 40) Johannesburg, South Africa
- Height: 1.80 m (5 ft 11 in)
- Turned pro: 2004
- Retired: 2015 (banned)
- Plays: Left-handed (two-handed backhand)
- Prize money: $1,155,255

Singles
- Career record: 41–58
- Career titles: 0
- Highest ranking: No. 77 (13 April 2009)

Grand Slam singles results
- Australian Open: 2R (2010)
- French Open: 3R (2008)
- Wimbledon: 1R (2008, 2009, 2012, 2013)
- US Open: 2R (2007, 2008)

Doubles
- Career record: 4–3
- Career titles: 0
- Highest ranking: No. 393 (12 May 2008)

Grand Slam doubles results
- Wimbledon: Q1 (2013)
- US Open: 1R (2009)
- Last updated on: 21 November 2022.

Wayne Odesnik (born November 21, 1985) is a South African-born American retired professional left-handed tennis player, with a two-handed backhand. His highest singles ranking was No. 77 in 2009.

Among his biggest upsets were a 2007 win over Ivan Ljubičić, and a 2009 win against Igor Kunitsyn.

Odesnik won his first Futures title in 2003, and won a combined 14 singles titles in Challenger and Future ITF Men's Circuit events. He resides in Weston, Florida, in the United States.

In March 2010, Odesnik pleaded guilty to importing human growth hormone into Australia, and was banned for two years by the International Tennis Federation, later reduced to one year on account of his "substantial assistance" with the Federation's anti-doping program. In March 2015 he was handed a 15-year ban after a second doping violation after testing positive for anabolic agents and peptides.

== Early and personal life ==
Odesnik and his family emigrated from South Africa to the United States when he was age 3, and he became an American citizen. His father, Harold, is a jeweler who owns a store in Aventura, just north of Miami, Florida, and his mother, Janice, is a former South African competitive gymnast who is now a computer coordinator. His grandmother, Sylvia, was a professional ice skater.

== Tennis career ==
Odesnik was introduced to tennis at age 7 by his grandmother, and his first tennis club was the Jewish Community Center in North Miami Beach, Florida.

=== Junior career (2000–01) ===
In 2000 Odesnik lost in the finals in singles at the Easter Bowl. In 2001 he won the singles title at the El Paso Youth Tennis Centre ITF Tournament, was a semifinalist in both singles and doubles (with Jarrett Chirico) at the USTA Junior International Hard Court Championships, finished in third place in singles and doubles (with Chirico) at the boys’ 16 USTA Super National Hard Court Championships, and was a boys’ 16 singles semifinalist at the USTA Super National Clay Court Championships. He also won the Curaçao Junior Open, and won the doubles title (with Chirico) and at the USTA Super National Spring Championships – The Easter Bowl.

=== Professional career; 2001–04 ===
Odesnik first competed professionally in 2001, playing only one match. He didn't win anything in 2002, but did go on to win two futures events in Jamaica in 2003, winning the first over Jacob Adaktusson in the final, and the next against Juan Mónaco in the final.

2004 saw Odesnik make three Futures finals late in the season, losing at first to Horia Tecău, then making the second final and again losing to Tecău, then losing in his third final to Brendan Evans. He also participated in the 2004 U.S. Open, after receiving a wildcard entry into the main draw. He lost to David Sánchez. Odesnik reached one Futures doubles final partnering with Zack Fleishman, but lost in the final to Tecău (this time in doubles) and Alex Kuznetsov.

=== 2005 ===
Odesnik reached one Futures doubles final with Josh Goffi, but lost to Scott Lipsky and David Martin. In 2005 singles play, Odesnik won two finals out of five in Futures play, ending the year with a 10-match winning streak. He won two straight titles in tournaments entered, in Honolulu and Waikoloa, Hawaii. He beat Lipsky in the first final, and then beat Sam Querrey a week later on his 20th birthday. He also participated in an ATP Masters Series event, at the Indian Wells Masters, losing in the first round to Fernando Verdasco. He wound up 2005 with a 10-match winning streak and ranked 265 for singles, 1,091 for doubles.

=== 2006 ===
In 2006 Odesnik won three singles titles on the Futures circuit. He lost in straight sets to Raemon Sluiter at the 2005 U.S. Open. He beat Scott Oudsema, in his first title of the Futures year in Little Rock, Arkansas, as he did not drop a set in any of his matches, then Harsh Mankad in Mobile, Alabama to win a title the following week, and then won the Milan Challenger title over bronze Olympic medalist Arnaud di Pasquale in three sets in the final. On April 4, 2006, he was named USTA Circuit Player of the Week. He ended 2006 ranked 194 for singles, and 780 for doubles.

=== 2007 ===
In Challenger events, he reached the finals of Karlsruhe, where he lost to Mischa Zverev. He went on to make the third round of a major-level event, beating Juan Martín del Potro. He then lost to John Isner in three tiebreak sets.

At the August 2007 Rogers Masters, Odesnik had an amazing run. In qualifying he defeated Jan Hernych. He went on to the main draw of the ATP Masters Series Canada, and upset Ivan Ljubičić in three sets, before going down to Frank Dancevic.

At the 2007 U.S. Open, Odesnik beat Danai Udomchoke of Thailand 7–5 in the fifth set to reach the second round. He then lost there to eventual quarterfinalist Juan Ignacio Chela. In October in Sacramento, California, he beat Yen-Hsun Lu in the finals. Later that month in Busan, Korea, he again defeated Lu, before losing in the quarterfinals.

In December, Alex Kuznetsov, Jesse Levine, and Odesnik were invited by the USTA to play off in a round-robin for the wild-card berth in the Australian Open. Levine won the wild card, defeating Odesnik.

Odesnik was 4–3 for the year in ATP play, and 26–17 on the Challenger circuit. He ended 2007 ranked #126 for singles, and #553 for doubles.

=== 2008 ===
In February, at the San Jose International Series, Odesnik defeated Donald Young. In April at the International Series in Houston, Texas, he beat Dudi Sela, and Sergio Roitman. At the World Team Championship in Germany in May he beat Ivo Minář, and in doubles he and partner James Blake beat Lucas Arnold and Sebastián Prieto, and Czechs Tomáš Berdych and Pavel Vízner.

In early 2008 Odesnik was coached by Félix Mantilla Botella.

At the French Open in May, he beat Cañas 7–6, 7–6, 7–6 in a very tight three-hour and 46-minute match that got him to round 2 of the grand slam. "I was just trying not to put [Cañas] on a pedestal in my mind", said Odesnik. He then beat Hyung-Taik Lee in the next round.

At Wimbledon he arrived on court against 24th-seed Jarkko Nieminen with heavy strapping on his thigh, and succumbed to injury after losing the opening set 6–3. Odesnik underwent rehab on an injured Muscle in his left hip; a small tear in his groin that he had suffered in a tournament in Poland.

In August he beat Bobby Reynolds in Los Angeles, Sébastien Grosjean in New Haven, and at the US Open Fabio Fognini. In November Odesnik beat Diego Junqueira in Ecuador. He ended 2008 ranked #119 for singles, and #558 for doubles.

=== 2009 ===
In February, Odesnik won the Home Depot Center USTA Challenger in Carson, California, beating Vincent Spadea in the semifinals. Seeded fourth, Odesnik dropped only one set in five tournament matches—to fifth-seeded Jesse Levine in the quarterfinals, in a match that took over three hours.

In April at the U.S. Men's Clay Court Championships in Houston, Texas at River Oaks Country Club, Odesnik defeated third-seeded Jürgen Melzer of Austria (winning 94% of his second-serve points), beat fellow American John Isner in a 2:37 quarterfinal marathon, and defeated Björn Phau in the semifinals to reach his first ATP World Tour final, in which he lost to Lleyton Hewitt. Following the tournament, he received his then-career-best world ranking of #77.

As of April 11, in 14 ATP World Tour clay-court matches he had the best winning percentage among Americans on clay; 0.714.

At the 2009 French Open Odesnik lost in three hours and 43 minutes on the main Court Philippe Chatrier to the hometown favorite Gilles Simon.

At Wimbledon Odesnik lost his first round match to 30th-ranked Jürgen Melzer. The match generated some media attention as a consequence of the patterns of pre-match betting on the result, with the online betting exchange Betfair reporting that unusually large sums for a low-profile match were wagered on the straight sets scoreline. Officials at Betfair did not suspect anything untoward, noting that an announcement had been made on TV shortly before the match that Odesnik was injured.

At the 2009 Indianapolis Tennis Championships in July, Odesnik beat fourth-seeded Igor Kunitsyn.

=== 2010 ===
On March 26, 2010, after having reached a world ranking of 98 in professional tennis, Odesnik pleaded guilty to importing human growth hormone (HGH) to Australia, prior to the Brisbane International, a warm-up event for the Australian Open. He was fined US$7,000, and faced a multi-year banishment from professional tennis. On April 19, Odesnik agreed to a voluntary suspension from the tour while awaiting a hearing by an independent tribunal, which was expected to take place around June 2010. In the meantime, Odesnik was free to return to the tour at any time.

On May 19, 2010, Odesnik was banned—initially for two years—by the International Tennis Federation, later reduced to one year on account of his "substantial assistance" with the Federation's anti-doping program, after pleading guilty to importing HGH into Australia. The suspension was dated to December 29, 2009. As part of the ban, his results since December 29 were erased, and he was required to forfeit his ranking points and prize money. Odesnik was ranked No. 114 and had earned more than $90,000 in prize money in 2010. In January 2013, it was revealed that Odesnik's name appeared in handwritten records of Biogenesis of America, a former Miami sports clinic linked to a performance-enhancing drug scandal in Major League Baseball. In records for 2009, 2010, and 2011, under the heading of 'Tennis' in five client lists, Odesnik's name appeared numerous times; the records indicated that he was billed $500 per month by the clinic. Odesnik denied any connection to the clinic.

=== 2011 ===
Unranked, Odesnik received a main draw wild card for ITF Futures event U.S.A. F1, and reached the quarter-finals. The following week, again as a wild card, he retired from his second round qualifying match. As the season wore on, Odesnik picked up a pair of singles titles at Challenger events: The Savannah Challenger, where he defeated Donald Young in the final, and the Fifth Third Bank Championships, where he beat James Ward.

=== 2012 ===
Odesnik started the year as the sixth seed at the Seguros Bolívar Open, a Challenger event, where he won the singles title by defeating Adrian Ungur in the final. He did not drop a set during the tournament.

=== 2015 ===
On March 18, 2015, Odesnik was handed a 15-year ban after a second doping violation after testing positive for anabolic agents and peptides.

== Style of play ==
Odesnik had a modest serve, an excellent forehand, an improving backhand, and good quickness. He also varied his first and second serves, hid the placement of his forehand, and played the angles on the court.

Odesnik undertook sessions with a sports psychologist in 2008. In 2009 he worked with fitness trainer Mikhail Zanko, and coached by Grant Doyle.

== ATP career finals ==
=== Singles: 1 (1 runner-up) ===
Legend Grand Slam Tournaments (0–0) ATP World Tour Finals (0–0) ATP Masters 1000 Series (0–0) ATP 500 Series (0–0) ATP 250 Series (0–1)	Finals by surface Hard (0–0) Clay (0–1) Grass (0–0) Carpet (0–0)	Finals by setting Outdoors (0–1) Indoors (0–0)

Result	W–L	Date	Tournament	Tier	Surface	Opponent	Score
Loss	0–1	Apr 2009	Houston, United States	250 Series	Clay	(Australia) Lleyton Hewitt	2–6, 5–7

== ATP Challenger and ITF Futures finals ==
=== Singles: 29 (15–14) ===
Legend ATP Challenger (7–8) ITF Futures (8–6)	Finals by surface Hard (11–10) Clay (4–4) Grass (0–0) Carpet (0–0)

Result	W–L	Date	Tournament	Tier	Surface	Opponent	Score
Win	1–0	May 2003	Jamaica F3, Montego Bay	Futures	Hard	(Argentina) Juan Monaco	2–6, 7–6^{(7–3)}, 6–0
Win	2–0	Sep 2003	Jamaica F7, Montego Bay	Futures	Hard	(Sweden) Jacob Adaktusson	7–6^{(7–3)}, 6–2
Loss	2–1	Oct 2004	USA F27, Laguna Niguel	Futures	Hard	(Romania) Horia Tecau	3–6, 2–6
Loss	2–2	Nov 2004	USA F31, Waikoloa	Futures	Hard	(Romania) Horia Tecau	4–6, 4–6
Loss	2–3	Nov 2004	USA F32, Honolulu	Futures	Hard	(United States) Brendan Evans	7–6^{(7–5)}, 6–7^{(2–7)}, 6–7^{(4–7)}
Loss	2–4	Apr 2005	USA F8, Mobile	Futures	Hard	(United States) Todd Widom	6–4, 4–6, 2–6
Loss	2–5	Jun 2005	USA F13, Auburn	Futures	Hard	(United States) Ryan Newport	2–6, 3–6
Loss	2–6	Sep 2005	USA F23, Costa Mesa	Futures	Hard	(United States) Sam Warburg	5–7, 4–6
Win	3–6	Nov 2005	USA F28, Waikoloa	Futures	Hard	(United States) Scott Lipsky	6–1, 6–1
Win	4–6	Nov 2005	USA F29, Honolulu	Futures	Hard	(United States) Sam Querrey	6–4, 6–3
Win	5–6	Mar 2006	USA F7, Little Rock	Futures	Hard	(United States) Scott Oudsema	6–2, 6–2
Win	6–6	Apr 2006	USA F8, Mobile	Futures	Hard	(India) Harsh Mankad	2–6, 6–3, 6–4
Win	7–6	Jun 2006	Milan, Italy	Challenger	Clay	(France) Arnaud Di Pasquale	5–7, 6–2, 7–6^{(7–5)}
Loss	7–7	Jun 2007	Karlsruhe, Germany	Challenger	Clay	(Germany) Mischa Zverev	6–2, 4–6, 3–6
Win	8–7	Oct 2007	Sacramento, United States	Challenger	Hard	(Chinese Taipei) Yen-Hsun Lu	6–2, 6–3
Win	9–7	Feb 2009	Carson, United States	Challenger	Hard	(United States) Scoville Jenkins	6–4, 6–4
Loss	9–8	Sep 2009	Tulsa, United States	Challenger	Hard	(United States) Taylor Dent	6–7^{(9–11)}, 6–7^{(4–7)}
Win	10–8	Feb 2011	USA F4, Palm Coast	Futures	Clay	(Italy) Nicola Ghedin	6–2, 6–1
Win	11–8	Mar 2011	USA F7, McAllen	Futures	Hard	(Portugal) Gastao Elias	6–7^{(5–7)}, 6–4, 6–1
Loss	11–9	Apr 2011	Tallahassee, United States	Challenger	Hard	(United States) Donald Young	4–6, 6–3, 3–6
Win	12–9	May 2011	Savannah, United States	Challenger	Clay	(United States) Donald Young	6–4, 6–4
Win	13–9	Jul 2011	Lexington, United States	Challenger	Hard	(United Kingdom) James Ward	7–5, 6–4
Loss	13–10	Aug 2011	Binghamton, United States	Challenger	Hard	(Chile) Paul Capdeville	6–7^{(4–7)}, 3–6
Win	14–10	Jan 2012	Bucaramanga, Colombia	Challenger	Clay	(Romania) Adrian Ungur	6–1, 7–6^{(7–4)}
Loss	14–11	Jan 2013	Bucaramanga, Colombia	Challenger	Clay	(Argentina) Federico Delbonis	6–7^{(4–7)}. 3–6
Loss	14–12	Apr 2013	Sarasota, United States	Challenger	Clay	(United States) Alex Kuznetsov	0–6. 2–6
Loss	14–13	Jun 2013	Furth, Germany	Challenger	Clay	(Portugal) Joao Sousa	6–3, 3–6. 4–6
Win	15–13	Feb 2014	Chitre, Panama	Challenger	Hard	(Chinese Taipei) Jimmy Wang	5–7, 6–4, 6–4
Loss	15–14	Jul 2014	Binghamton, United States	Challenger	Hard	(Ukraine) Sergiy Stakhovsky	4–6, 6–7^{(9–11)}

=== Doubles: 2 (0–2) ===
Legend ATP Challenger (0–0) ITF Futures (0–2)	Finals by surface Hard (0–2) Clay (0–0) Grass (0–0) Carpet (0–0)

Result	W–L	Date	Tournament	Tier	Surface	Partner	Opponents	Score
Loss	0–1	Nov 2004	USA F32, Honolulu	Futures	Hard	(United States) Zack Fleishman	(United States) Alex Kuznetsov (Romania) Horia Tecau	walkover
Loss	0–2	Mar 2005	USA F5, Harlingen	Futures	Hard	(Brazil) Josh Goffi	(United States) Scott Lipsky (United States) David Martin	4–6, 6–7^{(5–7)}

== Performance timeline ==
Key
W	F	SF	QF	#R	RR	Q#	DNQ	A	NH

(W) winner; (F) finalist; (SF) semifinalist; (QF) quarterfinalist; (#R) rounds 4, 3, 2, 1; (RR) round-robin stage; (Q#) qualification round; (DNQ) did not qualify; (A) absent; (NH) not held; (SR) strike rate (events won / competed); (W–L) win–loss record.

=== Singles ===
Tournament	2004	2005	2006	2007	2008	2009	2010	2011	2012	2013	2014	2015	SR	W–L	Win%
Grand Slam tournaments
Australian Open	A	A	Q1	Q2	1R	1R	2R	A	A	Q1	1R	Q2	0 / 4	1–4	20%
French Open	A	A	A	Q2	3R	1R	A	A	Q1	Q3	A	A	0 / 2	2–2	50%
Wimbledon	A	A	A	A	1R	1R	A	A	1R	1R	Q2	A	0 / 4	0–4	0%
US Open	1R	Q2	1R	2R	2R	1R	A	Q1	Q2	Q2	1R	A	0 / 6	2–6	25%
Win–loss	0–1	0–0	0–1	1–1	3–4	0–4	1–1	0–0	0–1	0–1	0–2	0–0	0 / 16	5–16	24%
ATP Tour Masters 1000
Indian Wells	Q2	1R	A	Q1	2R	1R	1R	A	A	2R	Q1	A	0 / 5	2–5	29%
Miami	A	A	A	Q2	Q2	Q2	Q1	A	A	Q1	Q1	A	0 / 0	0–0	–
Canada	A	A	A	2R	Q1	A	A	A	1R	A	A	A	0 / 2	1–2	33%
Cincinnati	A	A	A	A	Q1	1R	A	A	A	A	A	A	0 / 1	0–1	0%
Win–loss	0–0	0–1	0–0	1–1	1–1	0–2	0–1	0–0	0–1	1–1	0–0	0–0	0 / 8	3–8	27%

== See also ==
- List of select Jewish tennis players
