= Andrew Anderson (tennis) =

South African tennis player (born 1983)

- Country (sports): South Africa
- Born: 8 April 1983 (age 43) Johannesburg, South Africa
- Height: 1.93 m (6 ft 4 in)
- Turned pro: 2002
- Plays: Right-handed
- Coach: Ian Anderson, Neville Godwin
- Prize money: US$54,889

Singles
- Career record: 0–1 (at ATP Tour level, Grand Slam level, and in Davis Cup)
- Career titles: 0; 0 Challenger, 6 Futures
- Highest ranking: No. 376 (11 October 2010)

Doubles
- Career record: 0–0 (at ATP Tour level, Grand Slam level, and in Davis Cup)
- Career titles: 0; 1 Challenger, 12 Futures
- Highest ranking: No. 315 (27 February 2006)
- Last updated on: 16 May 2021.

Andrew Anderson (born 8 April 1983) is a South African tennis player who regularly played on the ITF Futures Tour and occasionally ATP Challenger Tour.

Anderson reached a career high ATP singles ranking of World No. 376 achieved on 11 October 2010. He also reached a career high ATP doubles ranking of world No. 315 achieved on 27 February 2006.

Anderson made his ATP Tour debut in singles at the 2009 SA Tennis Open where he advanced through the three qualifying rounds to earn his first and only main draw birth. In qualifying, he received a bye in the first round, and then defeated Benjamin Janse Van Rensburg 3–6, 6–3, 7–6^{(7–1)} and then Fritz Wolmarans 6–4, 3–6, 7–6^{(7–4)} to set up a first round match against eighth seed Marcos Baghdatis of Cyprus, which he would go on to lose 4–6, 2–6.

Anderson has reached 7 singles finals in his career, with a record of 6 wins and 1 loss all coming at the ITF Futures level. Additionally, he has reached 25 doubles finals in his career with a record of 13 wins and 12 losses, which includes one victorious appearance at the ATP Challenger level. He won the 2010 Oklahoma Challenger alongside compatriot Fritz Wolmarans, defeating Brett Joelson and Chris Klingemann 6–2. 6–2 in the final to capture the championship.

== ATP Challenger and ITF Futures finals ==
=== Singles: 7 (6–1) ===
Legend ATP Challenger (0–0) ITF Futures (6–1)	Finals by surface Hard (5–1) Clay (1–0) Grass (0–0) Carpet (0–0)

Result	W–L	Date	Tournament	Tier	Surface	Opponent	Score
Win	1–0	Sep 2004	Rwanda F1, Kigali	Futures	Clay	(Netherlands) Matwé Middelkoop	6–3, 7–6^{(7–3)}
Win	2–0	Sep 2005	Kenya F1, Mombasa	Futures	Hard	(Zimbabwe) Genius Chidzikwe	6–1, 6–3
Win	3–0	Oct 2005	Botswana F1, Gaborone	Futures	Hard	(Zimbabwe) Genius Chidzikwe	7–6^{(7–4)}, 2–6, 6–2
Loss	3–1	Oct 2005	Zimbabwe F1, Bulawayo	Futures	Hard	(South Africa) Izak van der Merwe	6–4, 4–6, 3–6
Win	4–1	Nov 2005	South Africa F2, Pretoria	Futures	Hard	(South Africa) Stephen Mitchell	6–2, 3–6, 6–3
Win	5–1	Oct 2009	South Africa F1, Pretoria	Futures	Hard	(Germany) Sebastian Rieschick	6–4, 6–2
Win	6–1	May 2010	South Africa F1, Durban	Futures	Hard	(Israel) Amir Weintraub	3–6, 6–3, 7–6^{(7–3)}

=== Doubles: 25 (13–12) ===
Legend ATP Challenger (1–0) ITF Futures (12–12)	Finals by surface Hard (12–10) Clay (1–2) Grass (0–0) Carpet (0–0)

Result	W–L	Date	Tournament	Tier	Surface	Partner	Opponents	Score
Win	1–0	Dec 2000	Philippines F1, Manila	Futures	Hard	(South Africa) Rik de Voest	(Australia) Domenic Marafiote (New Zealand) Lee Radovanovich	7–5, 6–7^{(5–7)}, 6–2
Loss	1–1	Mar 2001	New Zealand F1, Ashburton	Futures	Hard	(South Africa) Rik de Voest	(Australia) Jordan Kerr (Australia) Ashley Ford	3–6, 4–6
Win	2–1	Jun 2001	Namibia F1, Windhoek	Futures	Hard	(South Africa) Dirk Stegmann	(South Africa) Wesley Whitehouse (South Africa) Willem-Petrus Meyer	7–6^{(10–8)}, 6–3
Win	3–1	Sep 2002	USA F24C, Ojai	Futures	Hard	(South Africa) Willem-Petrus Meyer	(United States) Kean Feeder (United States) Derrick Bauer	3–6, 6–1, 6–3
Loss	3–2	Oct 2002	Namibia F1, Windhoek	Futures	Hard	(South Africa) Dirk Stegmann	(South Africa) Wesley Whitehouse (South Africa) Johannes Saayman	6–4, 4–6, 4–6
Loss	3–3	Nov 2002	Zimbabwe F1, Bulawayo	Futures	Hard	(South Africa) Nicholas Mcdonald	(Zimbabwe) Genius Chidzikwe (South Africa) Johan Du Randt	1–6, 6–7^{(7–9)}
Loss	3–4	Feb 2003	Nigeria F1, Benin City	Futures	Hard	(South Africa) Willem-Petrus Meyer	(Tunisia) Walid Jallali (Tunisia) Malek Jaziri	6–3, 4–6, ret.
Win	4–4	May 2003	Jamaica F3, Montego Bay	Futures	Hard	(South Africa) Willem-Petrus Meyer	(United Kingdom) James Auckland (South Africa) Johan Du Randt	6–4, 6–4
Loss	4–5	May 2003	Jamaica F4, Montego Bay	Futures	Hard	(South Africa) Willem-Petrus Meyer	(United Kingdom) James Auckland (South Africa) Nenad Toroman	3–6, 6–3, 4–6
Win	5–5	May 2003	Jamaica F5, Montego Bay	Futures	Hard	(South Africa) Willem-Petrus Meyer	(United States) Mark Dietrich (Canada) Frédéric Niemeyer	6–2, 1–6, 6–3
Win	6–5	Sep 2004	Kenya F1, Mombasa	Futures	Hard	(South Africa) Paul Anderson	(Morocco) Yassir Bouyahya (Morocco) Kamil Filali	6–1, 6–3
Loss	6–6	Oct 2004	Rwanda F1, Kigali	Futures	Clay	(South Africa) Paul Anderson	(Netherlands) Matwé Middelkoop (New Zealand) Adam Thompson	2–6, 6–2, 4–6
Loss	6–7	Dec 2004	South Africa F2, Pretoria	Futures	Hard	(South Africa) Paul Anderson	(South Africa) Shaun Rudman (South Africa) Stephen Mitchell	1–6, 7–5, 6–7^{(4–7)}
Win	7–7	Apr 2005	USA F8, Mobile	Futures	Hard	(South Africa) Roger Anderson	(United Kingdom) Richard Barker (United Kingdom) William Barker	6–3, 7–5
Win	8–7	Apr 2005	Mexico F3, Guadalajara	Futures	Clay	(South Africa) Roger Anderson	(Mexico) Pablo Martinez (Mexico) Carlos Palencia	6–4, 6–1
Loss	8–8	Jul 2005	USA F18, Joplin	Futures	Hard	(South Africa) Stephen Mitchell	(United States) John Isner (United States) Jeremy Wurtzman	7–6^{(7–3)}, 4–6, 6–7^{(4–7)}
Loss	8–9	Jul 2005	USA F19, Godfrey	Futures	Hard	(New Zealand) Daniel King-Turner	(United States) Sam Warburg (United States) Philip Stolt	4–6, 4–6
Win	9–9	Sep 2005	Kenya F1, Mombasa	Futures	Hard	(United Kingdom) Myles Blake	(Romania) Bogdan-Victor Leonte (Romania) Marcel-Ioan Miron	6–4, 6–4
Loss	9–10	Sep 2005	Rwanda F1, Kigali	Futures	Clay	(United Kingdom) Myles Blake	(Zimbabwe) Genius Chidzikwe (Zimbabwe) Gwinyai Tongoona	walkover
Loss	9–11	Oct 2005	Zimbabwe F1, Bulawayo	Futures	Hard	(South Africa) Stephen Mitchell	(South Africa) Izak van der Merwe (United States) Nicholas Monroe	6–4, 3–6, 0–6
Win	10–11	Oct 2005	South Africa F1, Pretoria	Futures	Hard	(South Africa) Stephen Mitchell	(South Africa) Izak van der Merwe (United States) Nicholas Monroe	6–7^{(4–7)}, 6–4, 6–2
Win	11–11	Nov 2005	South Africa F2, Pretoria	Futures	Hard	(South Africa) Stephen Mitchell	(United States) James Cerretani (South Africa) Jason Pieters	6–3, 6–4
Loss	11–12	Sep 2009	Great Britain F13, Wrexham	Futures	Hard	(Republic of Ireland) Colin O'Brien	(United Kingdom) Chris Eaton (United Kingdom) Dominic Inglot	6–3, 3–6, [6–10]
Win	12–12	Oct 2009	South Africa F1, Pretoria	Futures	Hard	(South Africa) Benjamin Janse Van Rensburg	(South Africa) Ruan Roelofse (South Africa) Hendrik Coertzen	6–3, 7–5
Win	13–12	Sep 2010	Tulsa, United States	Challenger	Hard	(South Africa) Fritz Wolmarans	(United States) Brett Joelson (Canada) Chris Klingemann	6–2, 6–2
