= Daniel Yoo (tennis) =

South Korean tennis player

- Country (sports): South Korea (2003–); United States (2004)
- Born: 25 September 1985 (age 39); Daejeon, South Korea
- Height: 1.80 m (5 ft 11 in)
- Plays: Left-handed (two-handed backhand)
- Prize money: $81,496

Singles
- Career record: 0–1 (at ATP Tour level, Grand Slam level, and in Davis Cup)
- Career titles: 5 ITF
- Highest ranking: No. 326 (13 June 2011)
- Current ranking: No. 1297 (18 September 2017)

Doubles
- Career record: 0–0 (at ATP Tour level, Grand Slam level, and in Davis Cup)
- Career titles: 4 ITF
- Highest ranking: No. 425 (15 August 2011)
- Current ranking: No. 1569 (18 September 2017)
- Last updated on: 18 September 2017.

Daniel Yoo (born 25 September 1985) is a South Korean / American former tennis player.

Yoo has a career high ATP singles ranking of 326 achieved on 13 June 2011. He also has a career high ATP doubles ranking of 425 achieved on 15 August 2011.

Yoo made his ATP main draw debut at the 2004 Legg Mason Tennis Classic after receiving a wildcard into the main draw. He lost in the first round to Paul-Henri Mathieu.
