= Fritz Wolmarans =

South African tennis player

- Country (sports): South Africa
- Residence: Cape Town, South Africa
- Born: 7 March 1986 (age 40) Bloemfontein, South Africa
- Plays: Left-handed (two-handed backhand)
- Prize money: $172,382

Singles
- Career record: 4–4 (at ATP Tour level, Grand Slam level, and in Davis Cup)
- Career titles: 0
- Highest ranking: No. 198 (16 May 2011)

Grand Slam singles results
- Australian Open: Q2 (2011)
- Wimbledon: Q2 (2011)
- US Open: Q2 (2011)

Doubles
- Career record: 1–2 (at ATP Tour level, Grand Slam level, and in Davis Cup)
- Career titles: 0
- Highest ranking: No. 412 (7 February 2011)
- Last updated on: 22 September 2014.

Fritz Wolmarans (born 7 March 1986) is a former professional South African tennis player.

Wolmarans has a career high ATP singles ranking of 198 achieved on 16 May 2011.

He also played for the South Africa Davis Cup team.

== Tennis career ==
=== Juniors ===
As a junior, Wolmarans reached as high as No. 12 in the combined world rankings in 2004. He scored notable victories over Juan Martín del Potro and Fabio Fognini.

As a junior, he compiled a singles win–loss record of 49–31.

Junior Grand Slam results – Singles:

Australian Open: 3R (2004)
French Open: 2R (2004)
Wimbledon: 2R (2003)
US Open: 3R (2003)

Junior Grand Slam results – Doubles:

Australian Open: 1R (2004)
French Open: QF (2004)
Wimbledon: A
US Open: A

=== Pro tour ===
In May 2011, Wolmarans reached his highest ATP singles ranking of World No. 198, whilst his highest doubles ranking is World No. 413 (achieved in September 2010). He has won one challenger in both singles and doubles.

== ATP Challenger and ITF Futures finals ==
=== Singles: 14 (8 titles-6 runner-ups) ===
Legend (singles) ATP Challenger Tour (1–1) ITF Futures (7–5)	Titles by surface Hard (7–6) Clay (1–0) Grass (0–0) Carpet (0–0)

Result	No.	Date	Tournament	Surface	Opponent	Score
Loss	1.	10 April 2005	USA F7, Little Rock, AR, USA	Hard	(Austria) Zbynek Mlynarik	3–6, 5–7
Win	2.	9 July 2006	Romania F10, Romania	Clay	(Romania) Teodor-Dacian Craciun	6–2, 6–3
Win	3.	6 August 2006	U.S.A. F20, IL, U.S.A.	Hard	(United States) Ryler DeHeart	6–4, 6–3
Loss	4.	19 November 2006	USA F29, HI, U.S.A.	Hard	(Israel) Dudi Sela	3–6, 3–6
Win	5.	20 June 2010	U.S.A. F14, Davis, CA, U.S.A.	Hard	(Australia) Artem Sitak	6–3, 6–4
Win	6.	26 September 2010	U.S.A. F24, CA, U.S.A.	Hard	(United States) Robbye Poole	6–0, 6–3
Win	7.	24 October 2010	U.S.A. F27, TX, U.S.A.	Hard	(United States) Jordan Cox	6–1, 6–2
Win	8.	20 March 2011	Rimouski, Canada	Hard(i)	(United States) Bobby Reynolds	6–7^{(2–7)}, 6–3, 7–6^{(7–3)}
Loss	9.	22 July 2012	Binghamton, United States	Hard	(United States) Michael Yani	4–6, 6–7^{(11–13)}
Win	10.	16 September 2012	Canada F8, Canada	Hard	(Hungary) Márton Fucsovics	6–3, 7–6
Win	11.	1 June 2014	South Africa F1, Stellenbosch	Hard	(South Africa) Tucker Vorster	3–6, 6–3, 7–6^{(7–3)}
Loss	12.	15 June 2014	South Africa F3, Stellenbosch	Hard	(South Africa) Nicolaas Scholtz	6–4, 2–6, 4–6
Loss	13.	13 July 2014	Canada F5, Canada	Hard	(Australia) Thanasi Kokkinakis	6–7^{(4–7)}, 6–7^{(3–7)}
Loss	14.	30 August 2015	Canada F7, Canada	Hard	(Ecuador) Gonzalo Escobar	6–7^{(4–7)}, 0–6

== Doubles finals: 3 (1–2) ==
Legend Grand Slam tournaments (0/0) ATP World Tour Finals (0/0) ATP World Tour Masters 1000 (0/0) ATP World Tour 500 Series (0/0) ATP World Tour 250 Series (0/0) ATP Challenger Tour (1/2)	Titles by surface Hard (1/1) Grass (0/0) Clay (0/1) Carpet (0/0)

Result	No.	Date	Tournament	Surface	Partner	Opponents	Score
Loss	1.	9 May 2010	Savannah, United States	Clay (green)	(United States) Bobby Reynolds	(United Kingdom) Jamie Baker (United Kingdom) James Ward	3–6, 4–6
Win	2.	19 September 2010	Tulsa, United States	Hard	(South Africa) Andrew Anderson	(United States) Brett Joelson (Canada) Chris Klingemann	6–2, 6–3
Loss	3.	11 September 2011	Shanghai, China	Hard	(United States) Michael Yani	(Thailand) Sanchai Ratiwatana (Thailand) Sonchat Ratiwatana	6–7^{(4–7)}, 3–6

== Singles performance timeline ==
Key
W	F	SF	QF	#R	RR	Q#	DNQ	A	NH

(W) winner; (F) finalist; (SF) semifinalist; (QF) quarterfinalist; (#R) rounds 4, 3, 2, 1; (RR) round-robin stage; (Q#) qualification round; (DNQ) did not qualify; (A) absent; (NH) not held; (SR) strike rate (events won / competed); (W–L) win–loss record.

Tournament	2008	2009	2010	2011	2012	2013	2014	W–L
Grand Slam tournaments
Australian Open	Q1	A	A	Q2	A	A	A	0–0
French Open	A	A	A	A	A	A	A	0–0
Wimbledon	A	A	A	Q2	A	A	A	0–0
US Open	A	A	A	Q2	A	A	A	0–0
Win–loss	0–0	0–0	0–0	0–0	0–0	0–0	0–0	0–0
Career statistics
Titles–Finals								
Year-end ranking	722	419	275	299	340	640	420	
