= Chris Wettengel =

American tennis player

- Country (sports): United States
- Born: 17 April 1982 (age 42)
- Plays: Right-handed (two-handed backhand)
- Prize money: $34,576

Singles
- Career record: 0–0 (at ATP Tour level, Grand Slam level, and in Davis Cup)
- Career titles: 0
- Highest ranking: No. 548 (29 October 2007)

Doubles
- Career record: 0–1 (at ATP Tour level, Grand Slam level, and in Davis Cup)
- Career titles: 0
- Highest ranking: No. 518 (6 February 2012)
- Last updated on: 29 April 2019.

Chris Wettengel (born 17 April 1982) is an American tennis player.

Wettengel has a career high ATP singles ranking of 548 achieved on 29 October 2007. He also has a career high ATP doubles ranking of 518 achieved on 6 February 2012.

Wettengel made his ATP main draw debut at the 2008 U.S. Men's Clay Court Championships in the doubles draw partnering Alex Reichel, entering as alternates after an injury to Patrick Briaud.

== Career titles ==
=== Doubles: 2 ===
Legend (doubles) ATP Challenger Tour ITF Futures Tour	Titles by surface Hard (2) Clay (0) Grass (0) Carpet (0)

Date	Tournament	Tier	Surface	Partner	Opponents	Score
Jan 2008	USA F2, North Miami Beach	Futures	Hard	(United States) Chris Lam	(Israel) Amit Inbar (India) Rupesh Roy	6–4, 6–7^{(6–8)}, [11–9]
Nov 2008	USA F28, Kohala Coast	Futures	Hard	(United States) Todd Paul	(United States) Devin Britton (United States) Jordan Cox	6–3, 7–5
