= Jordan Cox (tennis) =

American tennis player

- Country (sports): United States
- Residence: Bradenton, United States
- Born: January 7, 1992 (age 34) Miami, United States
- Height: 6 ft 2 in (1.88 m)
- Plays: Right-handed (two-handed backhand)
- Prize money: $34,721

Singles
- Career record: 0–0 (at ATP Tour level, Grand Slam level, and in Davis Cup)
- Career titles: 0
- Highest ranking: No. 449 (21 March 21, 2011)

Grand Slam singles results
- US Open: Q1 (2009, 2010)

Doubles
- Career record: 0–1 (at ATP Tour level, Grand Slam level, and in Davis Cup)
- Career titles: 0
- Highest ranking: No. 605 (30 July 2012)
- Last updated on: 4 August 2021.

Jordan Cox (born January 7, 1992) is an American tennis player. Cox has a career high ATP singles ranking of 449 achieved on March 21, 2011. He also has a career high ATP doubles ranking of 605 achieved on July 30, 2012.

Cox made his ATP main draw debut at the 2017 BB&T Atlanta Open in the doubles draw partnering Emil Reinberg. Cox played college tennis at Georgia Gwinnett College.

== ATP Challenger and ITF Futures finals ==
=== Singles: 3 (1–2) ===
Legend ATP Challenger (0–0) ITF Futures (1–2)	Finals by surface Hard (1–1) Clay (0–1) Grass (0–0) Carpet (0–0)

Result	W–L	Date	Tournament	Tier	Surface	Opponent	Score
Win	1–0	Apr 2010	Korea F3, Changwon	Futures	Hard	(China) Ze Zhang	6–4, 6–3
Loss	1–1	Oct 2010	USA F27, Mansfield	Futures	Hard	(South Africa) Fritz Wolmarans	1–6, 2–6
Loss	1–2	Sep 2011	Canada F5, Toronto	Futures	Clay	(United States) Jesse Levine	2–6, 2–6

=== Doubles: 5 (3–2) ===
Legend ATP Challenger (0–0) ITF Futures (3–2)	Finals by surface Hard (3–1) Clay (0–1) Grass (0–0) Carpet (0–0)

Result	W–L	Date	Tournament	Tier	Surface	Partner	Opponents	Score
Loss	0–1	Nov 2008	USA F28, Kohala Coast	Futures	Hard	(United States) Devin Britton	(United States) Todd Paul (United States) Chris Wettengel	3–6, 5–7
Win	1–1	Aug 2010	USA F20, Godfrey	Futures	Hard	(United States) Evan King	(South Africa) Jean Andersen (United States) Joshua Zavala	4–6, 6–3, [12–10]
Loss	1–2	Nov 2010	USA F30, Pensacola	Futures	Clay	(United States) Devin Britton	(Bulgaria) Dimitar Kutrovsky (United States) Jack Sock	7–5, 2–6, [8–10]
Win	2–2	Oct 2011	USA F27, Mansfield	Futures	Hard	(United States) Devin Britton	(United States) Sekou Bangoura (United States) Blake Strode	2–6, 6–2, [10–7]
Win	3–2	Jun 2012	USA F15, Chico	Futures	Hard	(United States) Devin Britton	(New Zealand) Daniel King-Turner (Australia) Nima Roshan	6–7^{(6–8)}, 7–6^{(10–8)}, [10–7]

== Junior Grand Slam finals ==
=== Singles: 1 (1 runner-up) ===
Result	Year	Tournament	Surface	Opponent	Score
Loss	2009	Wimbledon	Grass	(Russia) Andrey Kuznetsov	6–4, 2–6, 2–6
