= Michael McClune =

American tennis player

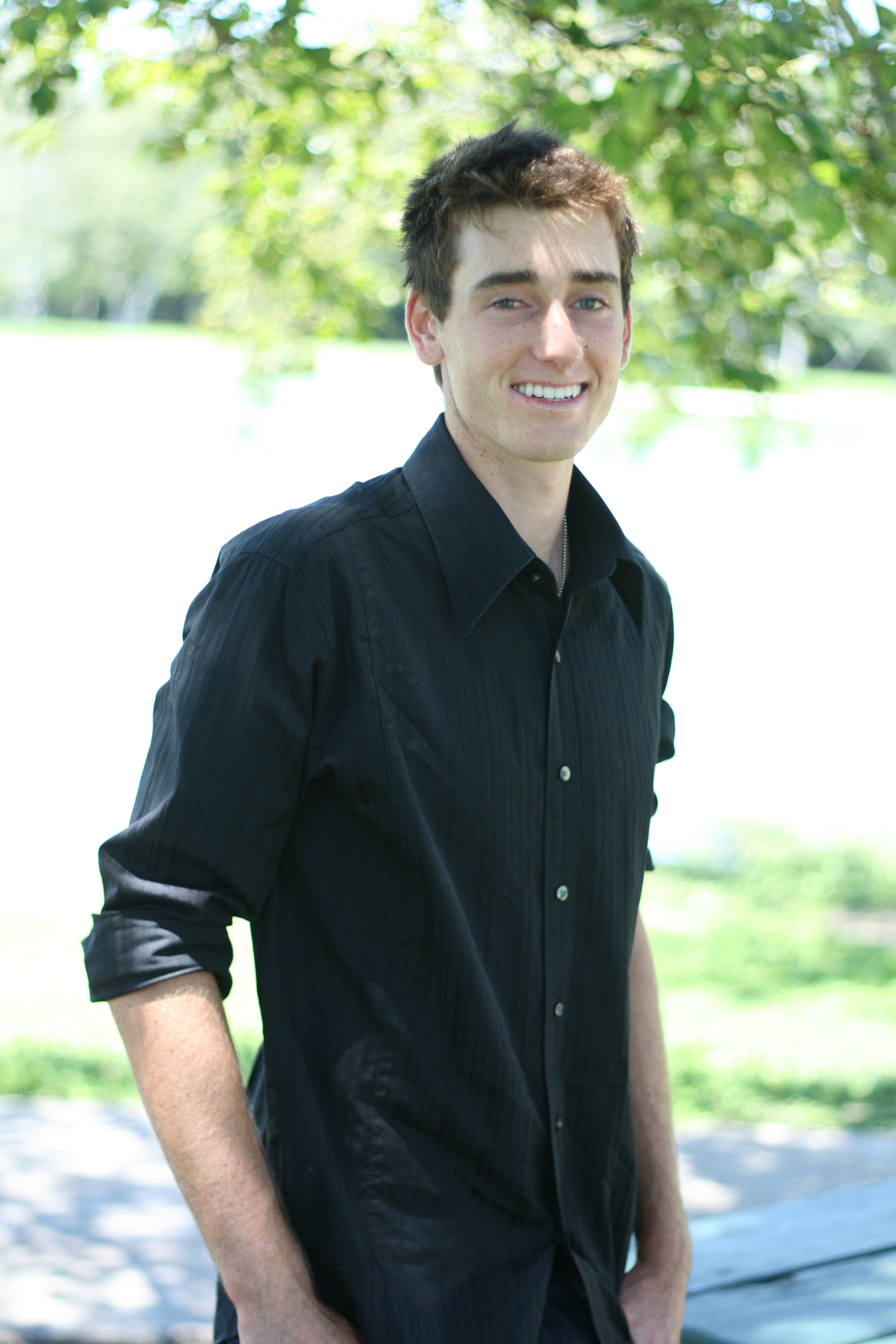
- Country (sports): United States
- Residence: Irvine, California, U.S.
- Born: August 22, 1989 (age 36) Long Beach, California, U.S.
- Height: 6 ft 3 in (1.90 m)
- Turned pro: 2007
- Plays: Right-handed (one-handed backhand)
- Coach: Eliot Teltscher
- Prize money: $143,401

Singles
- Career record: 1–2
- Career titles: 0
- Highest ranking: No. 267 (March 1, 2010)

Grand Slam singles results
- Australian Open: Q1 (2011)
- US Open: 1R (2007)

Doubles
- Career record: 1–1
- Career titles: 0
- Highest ranking: No. 317 (August 24, 2009)
- Last updated on: August 28, 2008.

Michael McClune (born August 22, 1989) is an American professional tennis player.

He turned professional in 2007, was represented by IMG and signed a lucrative contract with Nike.

== Junior career ==
Michael McClune at 2007 Boys' Nationals at Kalamazoo by John Tocci.

Michael was a finalist at the 2007 Luxilon Cup held at the 2007 Sony Ericsson Open where he lost to Kei Nishikori. As a Junior, McClune held the No. 1 ranking in the Boys' Singles 12s, 16s, and 18s divisions.

== Pro career ==
=== 2005 ===
McClune attempted to qualify for numerous USTA Pro Circuit events and, as a 15-year-old, received a wildcard to the qualifying round of the ATP event in Los Angeles, California.

=== 2006 ===
A breakout year for McClune on the USTA Pro Circuit – he reached the quarterfinals in Baton Rouge, Louisiana and Honolulu, Hawaii; the semifinals in McAllen, Texas; and was a finalist in Mansfield, Texas. He also received wildcards to the qualifying rounds of the ATP event in Los Angeles, California, and the ATP Masters Series event in Cincinnati, Ohio.

=== 2007 ===
McClune attempted to qualify for ATP events in San Jose, California; Newport, Rhode Island; and Los Angeles, California. He received wildcards to USTA Pro Circuit events in Dallas, Texas and Tallahassee, Florida, where he lost in the first rounds. In May, he received a wildcard to the USTA Pro Circuit event in Carson, California where he reached the second round and lost to Kei Nishikori of Japan.

As a 17-year-old, he was seeded No. 1 at the USTA Boys National 18s Tennis Championships in Kalamazoo, Michigan and won the title by defeating No. 3 seed Ryan Thacher, 6–1, 2–6, 6–4, 6–2. The win guaranteed him a wildcard into the main draw of the 2007 U.S. Open. He lost in the 1st round to the 20th seed Juan Ignacio Chela 6–2, 6–1, 7^{7}–6^{0}.

He reached the singles semifinals of the USTA Pro Circuit event in Claremont, California and partnered with Nikita Kryvonos to win the doubles title. He also reached the semifinal of the USTA Pro Circuit event in Laguna Niguel, California, where he lost to Nikita Kryvonos. McClune won his first professional title at the USTA Pro Circuit event in Costa Mesa, California, where he defeated Tim Smyczek in the final. A month later, McClune won his second pro title when he won the USTA Pro Circuit event in Mansfield, Texas by defeating Carsten Ball in the final. He followed that win with two quarterfinal showings at USTA Pro Circuit events in Baton Rouge and Nashville. In November, in the $50,000 Knoxville Challenger tournament in Tennessee he lost to Jesse Levine 6–4, 6–1, in the first round.

=== 2008 ===
McClune teamed up with Kaes Van't Hof and got a wildcard entry into the U.S. Open. They made it to the second round of the doubles tournament, where they were heavily defeated by Czech duo Martin Damm and Pavel Vízner.

== Personal ==
McClune lives in California. He was previously coached by Nick Fustar and mentored by ATP player Taylor Dent. His parents are Mickey and Liz and he has a sister, Kristin, who played volleyball at Pepperdine University. In 2010 Michael, along with his mom, Liz, and sister, Kristin, co-founded Events Clique, a web-based startup that enables users to create their own space plans, using free and enhanced paid products and services for the event planning and commercial real estate industries.
