= Blake Strode =

American tennis player and civil rights lawyer

- Country (sports): United States
- Residence: Cary, North Carolina, U.S.
- Born: July 9, 1987 (age 38) St. Louis, Missouri, U.S.
- Height: 1.88 m (6 ft 2 in)
- Turned pro: 2009
- Plays: Right-handed
- College: University of Arkansas Razorbacks
- Prize money: $60,116
- Official website: bladestrodetennis.com

Singles
- Career record: 0–1
- Career titles: 0
- Highest ranking: No. 311 (May 7, 2012)

Grand Slam singles results
- US Open: Q2 (2010, 2011)

Doubles
- Career record: 0–0
- Career titles: 0
- Highest ranking: No. 571 (July 16, 2012)
- Last updated on: April 20, 2015.

Blake Strode (born July 9, 1987 in St. Louis, Missouri) is an American civil rights lawyer serving as the executive director of ArchCity Defenders (ACD), and is a former professional tennis player.

== Early life and education ==
Strode grew up in Charlack, Berkeley, and Bridgeton, in North St. Louis County, Missouri, and graduated first in his class at Pattonville High School in Maryland Heights in 2005.

He earned degrees in Spanish and economics at the University of Arkansas, where he was an All American tennis player for the Razorbacks.

Strode was admitted into Harvard Law School in 2009, which he deferred for three years to pursue his career in tennis. At Harvard, he participated in the student practice organization "Project No One Leaves," reaching out to recently-foreclosed homeowners and informing them of their legal rights. He interned at the U.S. Department of Justice Civil Rights Division's voting section. He graduated in 2015, after several high-profile police brutality cases including the shooting of Michael Brown in Ferguson, Missouri.

== Sports career ==
Strode was a Missouri high school state champion in tennis. He won the Missouri Class 2 singles tournament in 2005 and advanced to the semifinals of the NCAA singles championship in 2009, earning NCAA All-American status. He was awarded the Intercollegiate Tennis Association's Arthur Ashe award for leadership and sportsmanship.

Strode qualified in the 2010 U.S. Open in Atlanta. Strode competed in the qualifying for the 2012 SAP Open, where he defeated Andre Begemann and Clayton Almeida before losing to Denis Kudla in the final qualifying round. However, due to number one seed Gaël Monfils withdrawing with a knee injury, Strode gained entry into the main draw where he lost in the second round.

== Advocacy career ==
Strode joined the nonprofit law firm ArchCity Defenders in 2015 as a Skadden Fellow leading a two-year housing project at the firm. He was eventually elevated to lead the firm's litigation department.

In January 2018. Strode was named the new executive director of the firm at age 30.

== See also ==
- Rory Ellinger
- Frankie Muse Freeman
