= Jesse Witten =

American tennis player (born 1982)

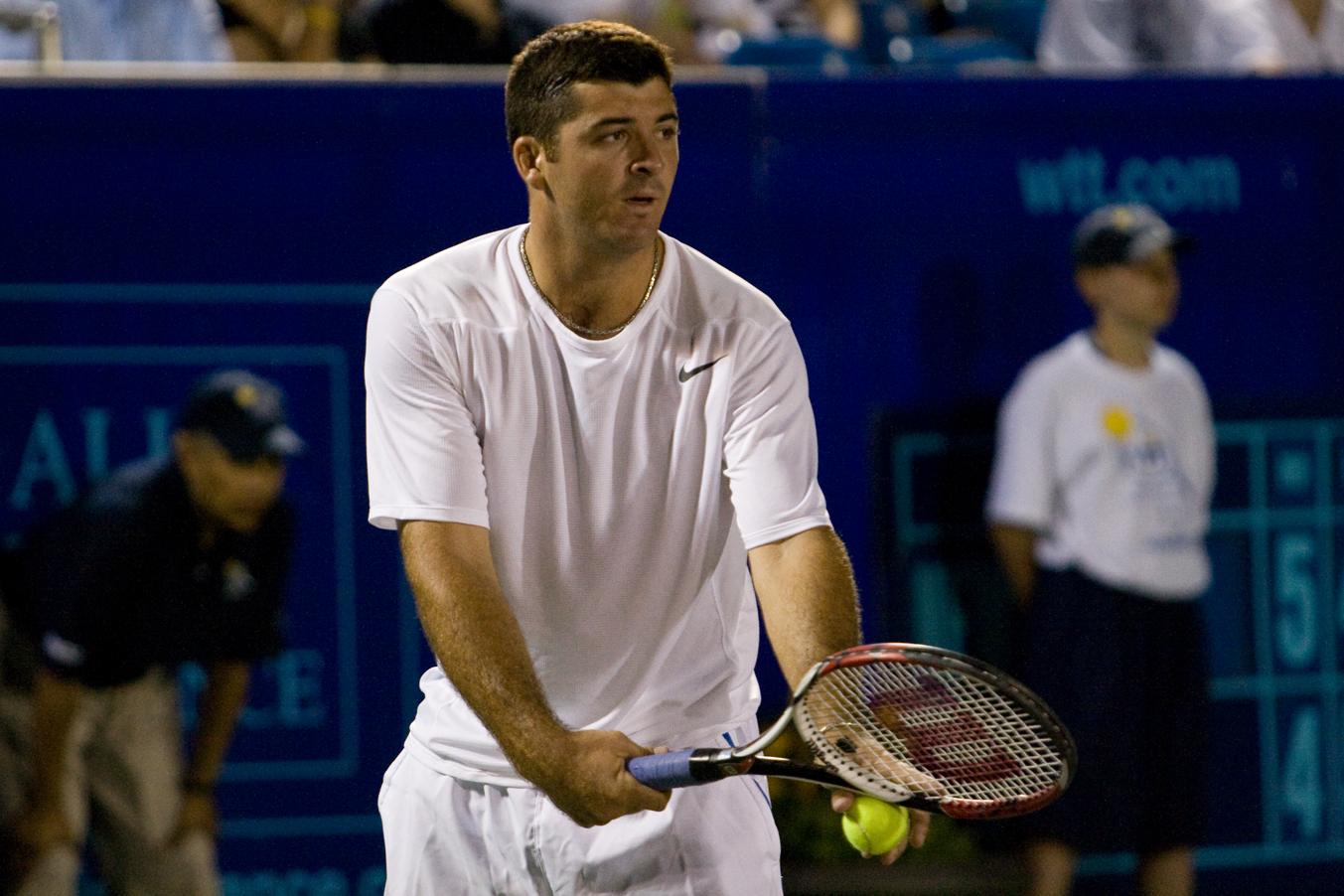
- Country (sports): United States
- Residence: Naples, Florida
- Born: October 15, 1982 (age 43) Naples, Florida
- Height: 1.78 m (5 ft 10 in)
- Turned pro: 2005
- Plays: Right-handed (two-handed backhand)
- Prize money: $402,100

Singles
- Career record: 2–9
- Career titles: 0
- Highest ranking: No. 163 (January 11, 2010)
- Current ranking: No. 1700 (November 11, 2019)

Grand Slam singles results
- Australian Open: Q2 (2007, 2010)
- French Open: 1R (2010)
- Wimbledon: 1R (2010)
- US Open: 3R (2009)

Doubles
- Career record: 0–2
- Career titles: 0
- Highest ranking: No. 274 (October 25, 2010)
- Current ranking: No. 1183 (November 11, 2019)
- Last updated on: May 28, 2020.

Jesse Witten (born October 15, 1982, in Naples, Florida) is an American professional tennis player. He is a graduate of Lely High School and the University of Kentucky, where he majored in kinesiology.

== College career ==
Witten had a highly successful college career at the University of Kentucky from 2001 to 2005. His achievements include:

- Reached Final of NCAA Championships (2002)
- Named the Intercollegiate Tennis Association (ITA) National Rookie of the Year (2002)
- Named the SEC Rookie of the Year (2002)
- Attained (4) first team All-SEC singles selections during his career
- The University of Kentucky's first (5) time ITA All-American (4 singles; 1 doubles)
- The University of Kentucky's first SEC Men's Tennis Player of the Year

== Professional career ==
=== 2001 ===
Upon graduating from Lely High School, Witten was given a wildcard to the USTA Pro Circuit event in Seminole, Florida, where he reached the semifinal.

=== 2002 ===
Witten was given a wildcard to the qualifying round of the US Open and also attempted to qualify for ATP events in Cincinnati, Ohio and Indianapolis, Indiana.

=== 2003 ===
The summer after his sophomore year of college, Witten played a handful of USTA Pro Circuit events and reach the semifinal of the event in Pittsburgh, Pennsylvania.

=== 2004 ===
As a wildcard, Witten won his first professional title at the USTA Pro Circuit event in Joplin, Missouri. He also reached two other finals at USTA Pro Circuit events in Peoria, Illinois, and Lexington, Kentucky.

=== 2005 ===
Upon graduation from the University of Kentucky, Witten was given a lucky loser entrance into the ATP event in Indianapolis, Indiana where he lost in the first round to Andy Murray. He then won consecutive titles later in the summer on the ITF Circuit in Ecuador. He finished the year strong by reaching the semifinals of USTA Circuit events in Waco, Texas, and Honolulu, Hawaii.

=== 2006 ===
His most successful year to date, Witten ended the year with a high of No. 171 on the ATP Tour. He attempted to qualify for the French Open and Wimbledon. He qualified for his first Grand Slam at the US Open where he lost in the first round to Paul Goldstein. He began the year by winning the title at the USTA Pro Circuit event in Tampa, Florida. He went on to win USTA Pro Circuit titles in Joplin, Missouri, and Harlingen, Texas. He received a wildcard to the ATP event in Houston, Texas, where he lost in the first round to Marcos Baghdatis. He also attempted to qualify for ATP events in Delray Beach, Florida, Newport, Rhode Island, Indianapolis, Indiana, and Cincinnati, Ohio. Witten made his main draw Grand Slam debut when he and Phillip Simmonds partnered in doubles at the US Open. They lost in the first round to the pairing of Alexander Peya and Björn Phau.

=== 2007 ===
Witten attempted to qualify for all four Grand Slam events. He qualified for the ATP event in Memphis, Tennessee, where he lost in the first round to Jürgen Melzer. Nearly a year and a half since his last title, Witten won his seventh championship at the USTA Pro Circuit event in Tulsa, Oklahoma, where he defeated Donald Young in the final. He reached the quarterfinals of five other USTA Pro Circuit events.

=== 2009 ===
Witten qualified for the 2009 U.S. Open, where he won his first round match against 29th seed Igor Andreev, 6–4, 6–0, 6–2. In second round, he defeated Máximo González 6–7^{(3)}, 6–4, 7–5, 6–3. In the third round, Witten lost the match to Novak Djokovic, 7–6^{(2)}, 3–6, 6–7^{(2)}, 4–6. This match was notable because he was #276 in the rankings while Djokovic was #4, and Witten won the first set 7–6.

=== 2010 ===
Witten qualified into the 2010 French Open but was defeated in the first round by the #25 seed Marcos Baghdatis 6–3, 6–4, 6–3.

=== 2012 ===
Witten won the Metzger Tournament at Colonial, and the 43rd annual City of Naples Tennis Championships at Cambier Park. Witten used protected ranking (367th) to get into the Panama City Challenger field after an 11-month break at pro level. He reached the semifinal, where he was forced to retire due to lower back injury.

=== 2013 ===
Witten won the 2013 F15 futures at Indian Harbour Beach.

=== 2015 ===
Witten played in the USA F16 in Tampa, Florida, and lost in the semi-finals to Tennys Sandgren after beating Rhyne Williams in the quarter-finals.

=== 2016 ===
At the Israel F7 ITF tournament, Witten reached the semi-finals and lost to fellow American Nicolas Meister. He won his 3rd Metzger Open.

=== 2017 ===
Witten defeated Collin Johns 6–2 and 6–3 to win his 4th Metzger Open Championship.

=== 2018 ===
Witten achieved his 3rd Metzger Open Championship in a row this year, and 5th in total.

== Playing style ==
Witten employs an offensive baseline game although he is capable of playing an all-round game. His main strengths are his groundstrokes, foot speed, balance and return game. His groundstrokes are technically sound on both forehand and backhand, he hits the ball extremely early which creates great power, depth and consistency. Given his overweight appearance, Witten regularly surprises opponents with his speed and quality of play.

== Personal ==
Witten began playing tennis at age 6. His father Paul works in construction management, and his mother Elaine is an optometrist. He has one older sister Sarah who is an elementary school teacher and also played tennis for the University of Kentucky. Jesse's younger brother Ben graduated in 2008 from the University of South Florida and works in Florida as a laboratory director. Witten likes every type of sport and is a big Miami Heat, Flint Tropics, and Miami Dolphins fan. He is also considered a Tua Tagovailoa superfan. He works as a coach in his hometown of Naples.
