= David Martin (tennis) =

American tennis player

- Country (sports): United States
- Residence: Huntington Beach, California, U.S.
- Born: February 22, 1981 (age 45) Tulsa, Oklahoma, U.S.
- Height: 6 ft 1 in (1.85 m)
- Turned pro: 2003
- Retired: 2011
- Plays: Left-handed (two-handed backhand)
- Prize money: $354,753

Singles
- Career record: 0–1
- Career titles: 0
- Highest ranking: No. 459 (June 26, 2006)

Doubles
- Career record: 45–68
- Career titles: 1
- Highest ranking: No. 38 (May 12, 2008)

Grand Slam doubles results
- Australian Open: 2R (2008)
- French Open: 2R (2008)
- Wimbledon: 3R (2007)
- US Open: 1R (1998, 2007, 2008, 2009, 2010, 2011)
- Last updated on: February 16, 2013.

David Martin (born February 22, 1981) is an American professional tennis player.

He teamed with Scott Lipsky to win his first ATP doubles title in February 2008 at the SAP Open in San Jose, California, defeating the number one ranked doubles team of Bob and Mike Bryan.

== Tennis career ==
Before attending Stanford, David was a US Open Boys' Doubles champion with eventual Stanford teammate K. J. Hippensteel in 1998.

He first teamed up with fellow American Scott Lipsky in doubles in college. They finished their college career ranked as the #2 team in the nation, and they extended their partnership into their pro careers. In 2007, Martin and Lipsky qualified for the 2007 Wimbledon men's doubles tournament, where the pair lost in the third round. He and Lipsky reached the ATP Los Angeles men's doubles final in 2007, where the team lost in straight sets to the top-ranked Bob and Mike Bryan. Lipsky and Martin captured their first ATP title in February 2008 at the SAP Open at HP Pavilion in San Jose, defeating the number one ranked doubles team of Bob and Mike Bryan, 7–6^{(4)}, 7–5 in the finals.

His career-high doubles ranking was World No. 38, achieved in May 2008.

== ATP career finals ==
=== Doubles: 6 (1–5) ===
Legend (doubles)
Grand Slam (0)
Tennis Masters Cup (0)
ATP Masters Series (0)
ATP International Series Gold (0)
ATP Tour (1–5)

Outcome	No.	Date	Tournament	Surface	Partner	Opponents	Score
Runner-up	1.	July 2007	Los Angeles, United States	Hard	(United States) Scott Lipsky	(United States) Bob Bryan (United States) Mike Bryan	6–7^{(5–7)}, 2–6
Winner	1.	February 2008	San Jose, United States	Hard (i)	(United States) Scott Lipsky	(United States) Bob Bryan (United States) Mike Bryan	7–6^{(7–4)}, 7–5
Runner-up	2.	April 2008	Munich, Germany	Clay	(United States) Scott Lipsky	(Germany) Michael Berrer (Germany) Rainer Schüttler	5–7, 6–3, [8–10]
Runner-up	3.	July 2008	Indianapolis, United States	Hard	(United States) Scott Lipsky	(Australia) Ashley Fisher (United States) Tripp Phillips	6–3, 3–6, [5–10]
Runner-up	4.	September 2008	Bangkok, Thailand	Hard (i)	(United States) Scott Lipsky	(Czech Republic) Lukáš Dlouhý (India) Leander Paes	4–6, 6–7^{(4–7)}
Runner-up	5.	January 2011	Chennai, India	Hard	(Netherlands) Robin Haase	(India) Mahesh Bhupathi (India) Leander Paes	2–6, 7–6^{(7–3)}, [7–10]
