= 2010 JSM Challenger of Champaign–Urbana – Doubles =

Urbana – Doubles
- 2010 JSM Challenger of Champaign–Urbana

Final
- Champions: (South Africa) Raven Klaasen (South Africa) Izak van der Merwe
- Runners-up: (United States) Ryler DeHeart (Canada) Pierre-Ludovic Duclos
- Score: 4–6, 7–6^{(7–2)}, [10–4]

Events
Singles	Doubles
← 2009 ·	JSM Challenger of Champaign–Urbana	· 2011 →

Brian Battistone and Dann Battistone were the defending champions. They were not compete this year.
3rd seeds Raven Klaasen and Izak van der Merwe won in the final 4–6, 7–6^{(7–2)}, [10–4], against 1st seeds Ryler DeHeart and Pierre-Ludovic Duclos.

== Seeds ==
1. (United States) Ryler DeHeart / (Canada) Pierre-Ludovic Duclos (final)
2. (Australia) Chris Guccione / (Australia) Peter Luczak (quarterfinals)
3. (South Africa) Raven Klaasen / (South Africa) Izak van der Merwe (champions)
4. (Australia) Adam Hubble / (Australia) Greg Jones (first round)

== Draw ==
=== Key ===
- Q = Qualifier
- WC = Wild card
- LL = Lucky loser
- Alt = Alternate
- SE = Special exempt
- PR = Protected ranking
- ITF = ITF entry
- JE = Junior exempt
- w/o = Walkover
- r = Retired
- d = Defaulted
- SR = Special ranking

=== Draw ===
First round
1	(United States) R DeHeart (Canada) P-L Duclos	6	6
(United States) B Joelson (United States) A Kumar	1	2
Q	(Australia) S Hoh (United States) C Roth	2	2
(United States) JP Fruttero (United States) D Martin	6	6
4	(Australia) A Hubble (Australia) G Jones	6^{3}	3
WC	(United States) M Czerwinski (United States) R Rowe	7	6
(Germany) D Blömke (Australia) J Lemke	2	1
(Bosnia and Herzegovina) A Delić (United States) B Reynolds	6	6
WC	(United States) D Nevolo (United States) A Souza	4	5
(United States) A Bogomolov Jr. (United States) A Kuznetsov	6	7
(United States) J Levine (United States) N Monroe	1	6	[3]
3	(South Africa) R Klaasen (South Africa) I van der Merwe	6	1	[10]
(United States) A El Mihdawy (South Korea) D Yoo	1	5
WC	(United States) J Hamui (India) K Singh	6	7
LL	(United States) B Livingston (United States) R Mortera	2	3
2	(Australia) C Guccione (Australia) P Luczak	6	6

Quarterfinals
1	(United States) R DeHeart (Canada) P-L Duclos	6	7
(United States) JP Fruttero (United States) D Martin	3	6^{1}
WC	(United States) M Czerwinski (United States) R Rowe	4	6	[8]
(Bosnia and Herzegovina) A Delić (United States) B Reynolds	6	1	[10]
(United States) A Bogomolov Jr. (United States) A Kuznetsov	1	2
3	(South Africa) R Klaasen (South Africa) I van der Merwe	6	6
WC	(United States) J Hamui (India) K Singh
2	(Australia) C Guccione (Australia) P Luczak	w/o

Semifinals
1	(United States) R DeHeart (Canada) P-L Duclos	6	6^{5}	[10]
(Bosnia and Herzegovina) A Delić (United States) B Reynolds	3	7	[8]
3	(South Africa) R Klaasen (South Africa) I van der Merwe	6	6
WC	(United States) J Hamui (India) K Singh	3	4

Final
1	(United States) R DeHeart (Canada) P-L Duclos	6	6^{12}	[4]
3	(South Africa) R Klaasen (South Africa) I van der Merwe	4	7	[10]
