= 2011 JSM Challenger of Champaign–Urbana – Doubles =

Urbana – Doubles
- 2011 JSM Challenger of Champaign–Urbana

Final
- Champions: (South Africa) Rik de Voest (South Africa) Izak van der Merwe
- Runners-up: (Germany) Martin Emmrich (Sweden) Andreas Siljeström
- Score: 2–6, 6–3, [10–4]

Events
Singles	Doubles
← 2010 ·	JSM Challenger of Champaign–Urbana	· 2012 →

Raven Klaasen and Izak van der Merwe were the defending champions but decided not to participate together.
Klaasen plays alongside John Paul Fruttero, while van der Merwe partners up with Rik de Voest.
They went on to win the title 2–6, 6–3, [10–4] against Martin Emmrich and Andreas Siljeström in the final.

== Seeds ==
1. (Germany) Martin Emmrich / (Sweden) Andreas Siljeström (final)
2. (Australia) Carsten Ball / (Australia) Chris Guccione (semifinals)
3. (United States) John Paul Fruttero / (South Africa) Raven Klaasen (semifinals)
4. (South Africa) Rik de Voest / (South Africa) Izak van der Merwe (champions)

== Draw ==
=== Key ===
- Q = Qualifier
- WC = Wild card
- LL = Lucky loser
- Alt = Alternate
- SE = Special exempt
- PR = Protected ranking
- ITF = ITF entry
- JE = Junior exempt
- w/o = Walkover
- r = Retired
- d = Defaulted
- SR = Special ranking

=== Draw ===
First round
1	(Germany) M Emmrich (Sweden) A Siljeström	6	6
(Canada) P-L Duclos (Australia) G Jones	3	0
Q	(United States) Benjamin Rogers (Australia) John-Patrick Smith	1	2
(Chinese Taipei) C-p Hsieh (Chinese Taipei) H-h Lee	6	6
3	(United States) JP Fruttero (South Africa) R Klaasen	6	6
(Finland) H Heliövaara (Ukraine) D Molchanov	1	4
PR	(United Kingdom) D Inglot (United States) S Johnson	3	4
PR	(Australia) A Hubble (Denmark) F Nielsen	6	6
(United Kingdom) C Eaton (United States) N Monroe	7^{7}	6
(Bosnia and Herzegovina) A Delić (United States) A Kuznetsov	6^{3}	2
(South Africa) F Wolmarans (United States) M Yani	7^{7}	4	[5]
4	(South Africa) R de Voest (South Africa) I van der Merwe	6^{4}	6	[10]
WC	(Philippines) R Gonzales (United States) R Rowe	1	4
WC	(United States) D Britton (United States) A Krajicek	6	6
WC	(United States) Marek Czerwinski (United States) Dennis Nevolo	6^{6}	5
2	(Australia) C Ball (Australia) C Guccione	7^{8}	7

Quarterfinals
1	(Germany) M Emmrich (Sweden) A Siljeström	6	6^{6}	[10]
(Chinese Taipei) C-p Hsieh (Chinese Taipei) H-h Lee	3	7^{8}	[8]
3	(United States) JP Fruttero (South Africa) R Klaasen	4	6	[10]
PR	(Australia) A Hubble (Denmark) F Nielsen	6	4	[6]
(United Kingdom) C Eaton (United States) N Monroe	3	6	[7]
4	(South Africa) R de Voest (South Africa) I van der Merwe	6	3	[10]
WC	(United States) D Britton (United States) A Krajicek	3	6	[7]
2	(Australia) C Ball (Australia) C Guccione	6	3	[10]

Semifinals
1	(Germany) M Emmrich (Sweden) A Siljeström	6	6
3	(United States) JP Fruttero (South Africa) R Klaasen	1	4
4	(South Africa) R de Voest (South Africa) I van der Merwe	6	6
2	(Australia) C Ball (Australia) C Guccione	3	2

Final
1	(Germany) M Emmrich (Sweden) A Siljeström	6	3	[4]
4	(South Africa) R de Voest (South Africa) I van der Merwe	2	6	[10]
