= 2009 JSM Challenger of Champaign–Urbana – Doubles =

Urbana – Doubles
- 2009 JSM Challenger of Champaign–Urbana

Final
- Champions: (United States) Brian Battistone (United States) Dann Battistone
- Runners-up: (Philippines) Treat Conrad Huey (India) Harsh Mankad
- Score: 7–5, 7–6(5)

Events
Singles	Doubles
← 2008 ·	JSM Challenger of Champaign–Urbana	· 2010 →

Rajeev Ram and Bobby Reynolds were the defending champions, but Reynolds decided to not compete due to injury.
As a result, Ram partnered with David Martin, however they were eliminated by brothers Battistone in the quarterfinals.
Brian and Dann Battistone won in the final match 7–5, 7–6(5), against Treat Conrad Huey and Harsh Mankad.

== Seeds ==
1. (United States) David Martin / (United States) Rajeev Ram (quarterfinals)
2. (Philippines) Treat Conrad Huey / (India) Harsh Mankad (final)
3. (Australia) Kaden Hensel / (Australia) Adam Hubble (first round)
4. (Germany) Martin Emmrich / (Sweden) Andreas Siljeström (semifinals)

== Draw ==
=== Key ===
- Q = Qualifier
- WC = Wild card
- LL = Lucky loser
- Alt = Alternate
- SE = Special exempt
- PR = Protected ranking
- ITF = ITF entry
- JE = Junior exempt
- w/o = Walkover
- r = Retired
- d = Defaulted
- SR = Special ranking

=== Draw ===
First round
1	(United States) D Martin (United States) R Ram	6	4	[12]
WC	(United States) C Gaston (United States) R Harrison	3	6	[10]
WC	(United States) M Czerwinski (United States) D Nevolo	6^{4}	6	[7]
(United States) B Battistone (United States) D Battistone	7	4	[10]
3	(Australia) K Hensel (Australia) A Hubble	6	6^{2}	[6]
(United Kingdom) J Delgado (United States) JP Fruttero	4	7	[10]
(United States) A Kuznetsov (United States) J Witten	6	6
WC	(South Africa) K Anderson (United States) R Gonzales	4	4
(United States) S Jenkins (United States) P Simmonds	6^{5}	6^{5}
Q	(United States) A Kumar (United States) R Rowe	7	7
LL	(United States) T Aaron (United States) C Schwartz	5	2
4	(Germany) M Emmrich (Sweden) A Siljeström	7	6
(United Kingdom) R Bloomfield (India) P Raja	0	6^{2}
(United Kingdom) D Inglot (United States) R Rizza	6	7
(United States) N Monroe (South Africa) I van der Merwe	4	3
2	(Philippines) TC Huey (India) H Mankad	6	6

Quarterfinals
1	(United States) D Martin (United States) R Ram	4	6	[4]
(United States) B Battistone (United States) D Battistone	6	4	[10]
(United Kingdom) J Delgado (United States) JP Fruttero	6	6
(United States) A Kuznetsov (United States) J Witten	1	2
Q	(United States) A Kumar (United States) R Rowe	6^{5}	6^{5}
4	(Germany) M Emmrich (Sweden) A Siljeström	7	7
(United Kingdom) D Inglot (United States) R Rizza	6	6^{5}	[7]
2	(Philippines) TC Huey (India) H Mankad	3	7	[10]

Semifinals
(United States) B Battistone (United States) D Battistone	7	6
(United Kingdom) J Delgado (United States) JP Fruttero	5	4
4	(Germany) M Emmrich (Sweden) A Siljeström	6	1	[5]
2	(Philippines) TC Huey (India) H Mankad	3	6	[10]

Final
(United States) B Battistone (United States) D Battistone	7	7
2	(Philippines) TC Huey (India) H Mankad	5	6^{5}
