= 2010 JSM Challenger of Champaign–Urbana – Singles =

Urbana – Singles
- 2010 JSM Challenger of Champaign–Urbana

Final
- Champion: (United States) Alex Bogomolov Jr.
- Runner-up: (Bosnia and Herzegovina) Amer Delić
- Score: 5–7, 7–6(7), 6–3

Events
Singles	Doubles
← 2009 ·	JSM Challenger of Champaign–Urbana	· 2011 →

Michael Russell was the defending champion, but decided not to participate.
Alex Bogomolov Jr. defeated Amer Delić 5–7, 7–6(7), 6–3 in the final to win the tournament.

== Seeds ==
1. (Japan) Kei Nishikori (second round)
2. (Australia) Peter Luczak (quarterfinals)
3. (Australia) Carsten Ball (first round)
4. (South Africa) Izak van der Merwe (first round)
5. (United States) Bobby Reynolds (semifinals)
6. (United States) Alex Bogomolov Jr. (champion)
7. (United States) Lester Cook (first round)
8. (Ecuador) Giovanni Lapentti (first round)

== Draw ==
=== Key ===
- Q = Qualifier
- WC = Wild card
- LL = Lucky loser
- Alt = Alternate
- SE = Special exempt
- PR = Protected ranking
- ITF = ITF entry
- JE = Junior exempt
- w/o = Walkover
- r = Retired
- d = Defaulted
- SR = Special ranking

=== Finals ===
Semifinals
WC	(Bosnia and Herzegovina) Amer Delić	3	6	6
(United States) Jesse Witten	6	3	4
6	(United States) Alex Bogomolov Jr.	2	6	7
5	(United States) Bobby Reynolds	6	0	6^{4}

Final
WC	(Bosnia and Herzegovina) Amer Delić	7	6^{7}	3
6	(United States) Alex Bogomolov Jr.	5	7	6

=== Top half ===
First round
1	(Japan) K Nishikori	6	6
(Australia) C Guccione	4	4
WC	(Bosnia and Herzegovina) A Delić	6	6
Q	(South Africa) A Anderson	4	1
WC	(United States) S Johnson	6	6
Q	(United States) JP Fruttero	4	4
(Australia) J Lemke	6	6
8	(Ecuador) G Lapentti	4	4
4	(South Africa) I van der Merwe	6^{4}	6	4
(United States) J Witten	7	3	6
(South Africa) R Klaasen	6	6
(United States) R DeHeart	3	2
WC	(United States) A Souza	5	1
(United States) J Levine	7	6
(United States) M Yani	6	7
7	(United States) L Cook	3	5

Second round
1	(Japan) K Nishikori	5	3
WC	(Bosnia and Herzegovina) A Delić	7	6
WC	(United States) S Johnson	7	7
(Australia) J Lemke	5	6^{2}
(United States) J Witten	6	6
(South Africa) R Klaasen	3	3
(United States) J Levine	3	4
(United States) M Yani	6	6

Quarterfinals
WC	(Bosnia and Herzegovina) A Delić	7	7
WC	(United States) S Johnson	6^{5}	6^{1}
(United States) J Witten	6	6
(United States) M Yani	4	4

Semifinals
WC	(Bosnia and Herzegovina) A Delić	3	6	6
(United States) J Witten	6	3	4

=== Bottom half ===
First round
6	(United States) A Bogomolov Jr.	1	6	6
Q	(Slovenia) L Gregorc	6	1	2
(Russia) A Kumantsov	6^{5}	7	1^{r}
(Australia) G Jones	7	6^{2}	4
Q	(United Kingdom) C Eaton	3	6^{4}
SE	(United States) N Monroe	6	7
SE	(South Africa) F Wolmarans	1	6	6
3	(Australia) C Ball	6	3	4
5	(United States) B Reynolds	6	3	6
(United States) M McClune	3	6	4
(Germany) D Blömke	6	6
(South Korea) D Yoo	3	4
(United States) A El Mihdawy	4	1
(United States) A Kuznetsov	6	6
WC	(United States) D Nevolo	4	7	3
2	(Australia) P Luczak	6	6^{5}	6

Second round
6	(United States) A Bogomolov Jr.	7	6
(Australia) G Jones	6^{3}	3
SE	(United States) N Monroe	3	6^{3}
SE	(South Africa) F Wolmarans	6	7
5	(United States) B Reynolds	7	6
(Germany) D Blömke	6^{10}	4
(United States) A Kuznetsov	6^{11}	2
2	(Australia) P Luczak	7	6

Quarterfinals
6	(United States) A Bogomolov Jr.	6	6
SE	(South Africa) F Wolmarans	2	1
5	(United States) B Reynolds	7	6
2	(Australia) P Luczak	6^{3}	3

Semifinals
6	(United States) A Bogomolov Jr.	2	6	7
5	(United States) B Reynolds	6	0	6^{4}
