= 2011 JSM Challenger of Champaign–Urbana – Singles =

Urbana – Singles
- 2011 JSM Challenger of Champaign–Urbana

Final
- Champion: (United States) Alex Kuznetsov
- Runner-up: (South Africa) Rik De Voest
- Score: 6–1, 6–3

Events
Singles	Doubles
← 2010 ·	JSM Challenger of Champaign–Urbana	· 2012 →

Alex Bogomolov Jr. was the defending champion but decided not to participate.
Alex Kuznetsov won the title, defeating Rik De Voest 6–1, 6–3 in the final.

== Seeds ==
1. (United States) Michael Russell (semifinals, retired)
2. (South Africa) Izak van der Merwe (first round)
3. (Canada) Vasek Pospisil (second round)
4. (South Africa) Rik De Voest (final)
5. (Dominican Republic) Víctor Estrella (first round)
6. (Belarus) Uladzimir Ignatik (first round)
7. (United States) Michael Yani (first round, retired due to right shoulder injury)
8. (France) Vincent Millot (first round, retired due to left achilles injury)

== Draw ==
=== Key ===
- Q = Qualifier
- WC = Wild card
- LL = Lucky loser
- Alt = Alternate
- SE = Special exempt
- PR = Protected ranking
- ITF = ITF entry
- JE = Junior exempt
- w/o = Walkover
- r = Retired
- d = Defaulted
- SR = Special ranking

=== Finals ===
Semifinals
1	(United States) Michael Russell	6	4	3^{r}
4	(South Africa) Rik de Voest	3	6	5
Q	(Canada) Peter Polansky	2	4
(United States) Alex Kuznetsov	6	6

Final
4	(South Africa) Rik de Voest	1	3
(United States) Alex Kuznetsov	6	6

=== Top half ===
First round
1	(United States) M Russell	6	6
(South Africa) R Klaasen	4	3
(United Kingdom) J Baker	4	7	6
Q	(United Kingdom) A Bogdanovic	6	5	1
WC	(United States) B Baker	6	4	4
(Bosnia and Herzegovina) A Delić	2	6	6
(Denmark) F Nielsen	4
8	(France) V Millot	1r
4	(South Africa) R de Voest	6	6
(Canada) É Chvojka	0	2
Q	(United States) K Kim	7^{7}	0	4
SE	(Bosnia and Herzegovina) M Bašić	6^{6}	6	6
(Finland) H Heliövaara	7	6
WC	(United States) Roy Kalmanovich	5	3
WC	(United States) S Johnson	6^{7}	6	6
6	(Belarus) U Ignatik	7^{9}	4	4

Second round
1	(United States) M Russell	w/o
(United Kingdom) J Baker
(Bosnia and Herzegovina) A Delić	7^{7}	6
(Denmark) F Nielsen	6^{4}	2
4	(South Africa) R de Voest	3	6	6
SE	(Bosnia and Herzegovina) M Bašić	6	3	3
(Finland) H Heliövaara	6	3	7^{7}
WC	(United States) S Johnson	4	6	6^{4}

Quarterfinals
1	(United States) M Russell	3	6	7^{7}
(Bosnia and Herzegovina) A Delić	6	4	6^{2}
4	(South Africa) R de Voest	6	6
(Finland) H Heliövaara	3	1

Semifinals
1	(United States) M Russell	6	4	3^{r}
4	(South Africa) R de Voest	3	6	5

=== Bottom half ===
First round
7	(United States) M Yani	3	0^{r}
(Canada) P-L Duclos	6	1
WC	(United States) Dennis Nevolo	4	6^{5}
Q	(Australia) John-Patrick Smith	6	7^{7}
Q	(Canada) P Polansky	6	3	6
(Moldova) R Borvanov	3	6	4
(Ukraine) D Molchanov	1	4
3	(Canada) V Pospisil	6	6
5	(Dominican Republic) V Estrella	5	1
(United States) A Kuznetsov	7	6
SE	(United States) J Levine	6	6^{1}	6
(Russia) D Matsukevich	1	7^{7}	2
(Australia) G Jones	6	6
(South Africa) F Wolmarans	3	4
(Australia) C Guccione	7^{7}	6
2	(South Africa) I van der Merwe	6^{3}	3

Second round
(Canada) P-L Duclos	4	4
Q	(Australia) J-P Smith	6	6
Q	(Canada) P Polansky	4	6	6
3	(Canada) V Pospisil	6	3	4
(United States) A Kuznetsov	6
SE	(United States) J Levine	1	r
(Australia) G Jones	6	2	3
(Australia) C Guccione	4	6	6

Quarterfinals
Q	(Australia) J-P Smith	2	4
Q	(Canada) P Polansky	6	6
(United States) A Kuznetsov	6^{6}	6	6
(Australia) C Guccione	7^{8}	4	3

Semifinals
Q	(Canada) P Polansky	2	4
(United States) A Kuznetsov	6	6
