= 2009 JSM Challenger of Champaign–Urbana – Singles =

Urbana – Singles
- 2009 JSM Challenger of Champaign–Urbana

Final
- Champion: (United States) Michael Russell
- Runner-up: (United States) Taylor Dent
- Score: 7–5, 6–4

Events
Singles	Doubles
← 2008 ·	JSM Challenger of Champaign–Urbana	· 2010 →

Kevin Anderson, who was the defending champion, lost to qualifier Ričardas Berankis in the second round.
Michael Russell defeated his compatriot Taylor Dent 7–5, 6–4 in the final match.

== Seeds ==
1. (United States) Kevin Kim (semifinals)
2. (United States) Rajeev Ram (second round)
3. (United States) Michael Russell (champion)
4. (United States) Taylor Dent (final)
5. (United States) Jesse Levine (quarterfinals)
6. (India) ~~Somdev Devvarman~~ (withdrew)
7. (South Africa) Kevin Anderson (second round)
8. (United States) Robert Kendrick (first round)

== Draw ==
=== Key ===
- Q = Qualifier
- WC = Wild card
- LL = Lucky loser
- Alt = Alternate
- SE = Special exempt
- PR = Protected ranking
- ITF = ITF entry
- JE = Junior exempt
- w/o = Walkover
- r = Retired
- d = Defaulted
- SR = Special ranking

=== Finals ===
Semifinals
1	(United States) Kevin Kim	1	2
4	(United States) Taylor Dent	6	6
3	(United States) Michael Russell	6	6
Q	(Lithuania) Ričardas Berankis	3	1

Final
4	(United States) Taylor Dent	5	4
3	(United States) Michael Russell	7	6

=== Top half ===
First round
1	(United States) K Kim	6	6
WC	(United States) D Nevolo	1	3
WC	(United States) B Strode	7	6
(United States) V Spadea	5	2
(United States) S Jenkins	3	2
(United States) R Sweeting	6	6
WC	(United Kingdom) J Baker	3	6	6
8	(United States) R Kendrick	6	4	2
4	(United States) T Dent	6^{5}	6	6
(South Africa) I van der Merwe	7	3	4
(United States) T Widom	5
(United States) M Yani	1	r
WC	(United States) R Gonzales	1	1
(Paraguay) R Delgado	6	6
(United States) J Witten	6^{6}	3
5	(United States) J Levine	7	6

Second round
1	(United States) K Kim	6	6
WC	(United States) B Strode	4	0
(United States) R Sweeting	6	6
WC	(United Kingdom) J Baker	4	4
4	(United States) T Dent	6	6
(United States) T Widom	2	3
(Paraguay) R Delgado	4	6	4
5	(United States) J Levine	6	3	6

Quarterfinals
1	(United States) K Kim	6	6
(United States) R Sweeting	2	2
4	(United States) T Dent	6	6
5	(United States) J Levine	1	2

Semifinals
1	(United States) K Kim	1	2
4	(United States) T Dent	6	6

=== Bottom half ===
First round
LL	(Philippines) C Mamiit	2	5
Q	(Sweden) B Rehnquist	6	7
(Serbia) I Bozoljac	6^{3}	6	1
WC	(United States) N Monroe	7	4	6
(United States) M McClune	7	6
(United States) A Kuznetsov	5	4
Q	(Spain) A Brugués-Davi	1	2
3	(United States) M Russell	6	6
7	(South Africa) K Anderson	6	3	6
(Sweden) F Prpic	3	6	3
ALT	(United States) R Harrison	2	4
Q	(Lithuania) R Berankis	6	6
Q	(Australia) K Hensel	6	3	7
(United States) R DeHeart	3	6	6^{3}
(Slovenia) L Gregorc	2	6^{5}
2	(United States) R Ram	6	7

Second round
Q	(Sweden) B Rehnquist	7	6
WC	(United States) N Monroe	6^{3}	4
(United States) M McClune	7	4	2
3	(United States) M Russell	6^{4}	6	6
7	(South Africa) K Anderson	5	4
Q	(Lithuania) R Berankis	7	6
Q	(Australia) K Hensel	7	6
2	(United States) R Ram	6^{5}	3

Quarterfinals
Q	(Sweden) B Rehnquist	2	1
3	(United States) M Russell	6	6
Q	(Lithuania) R Berankis	6	6
Q	(Australia) K Hensel	0	2

Semifinals
3	(United States) M Russell	6	6
Q	(Lithuania) R Berankis	4	1
