= 2009 JSM Challenger of Champaign–Urbana =

- Date: 16–22 November
- Edition: 8th
- Location: Champaign, United States

Champions

Singles
- (United States) Michael Russell

Doubles
- (United States) Brian Battistone / (United States) Dann Battistone
← 2008 ·	JSM Challenger of Champaign–Urbana	· 2010 →

The 2009 JSM Challenger of Champaign–Urbana was a professional tennis tournament played on indoor hard courts. It was the eighth edition of the tournament which was part of the 2009 ATP Challenger Tour. It took place in Champaign, United States between 16 and 22 November 2009.

== Singles main-draw entrants ==
=== Seeds ===
Country	Player	Rank^{1}	Seed
USA	Kevin Kim	90	1
USA	Rajeev Ram	97	2
USA	Michael Russell	100	3
USA	Taylor Dent	105	4
USA	Jesse Levine	117	5
IND	~~Somdev Devvarman~~	~~124~~	~~6~~
RSA	Kevin Anderson	125	7
USA	Robert Kendrick	144	8

- Rankings are as of November 9, 2009.

=== Other entrants ===
The following players received wildcards into the singles main draw:

- (United States) Ruben Gonzales
- (United States) Nicholas Monroe
- (United States) Dennis Nevolo
- (United States) Blake Strode

The following players received entry from the qualifying draw:

- (Lithuania) Ričardas Berankis
- (Spain) Arnau Brugués Davi
- (Australia) Kaden Hensel
- (Sweden) Björn Rehnquist
- (Philippines) Cecil Mamiit (LL)

== Champions ==
=== Singles ===
(United States) Michael Russell def. (United States) Taylor Dent, 7–5, 6–4

=== Doubles ===
(United States) Brian Battistone / (United States) Dann Battistone def. (Philippines) Treat Conrad Huey / (India) Harsh Mankad, 7–5, 7–6(5)
