= 2010 BNP Paribas Open – Men's singles =

Men's singles
- 2010 BNP Paribas Open

Final
- Champion: (Croatia) Ivan Ljubičić
- Runner-up: (United States) Andy Roddick
- Score: 7–6^{(7–3)}, 7–6^{(7–5)}

Details
- Draw: 96
- Seeds: 32

Events
Singles	men	women
Doubles	men	women
- Indian Wells Masters

Ivan Ljubičić defeated Andy Roddick in the final, 7–6^{(7–3)}, 7–6^{(7–5)} to win the men's singles tennis title at the 2010 Indian Wells Masters. It was his first and only Masters title (following three previous runner-up finishes), making him the oldest maiden Masters champion.

Rafael Nadal was the defending champion, but lost to Ljubičić in the semifinals. Until the 2014 Australian Open, this was the last occasion where a player other than the Big Four won a title when each of the Big Four were competing.

== Seeds ==
All seeds receive a bye into the second round.

1. (Switzerland) Roger Federer (third round)
2. (Serbia) Novak Djokovic (fourth round)
3. (Spain) Rafael Nadal (semifinals)
4. (United Kingdom) Andy Murray (quarterfinals)
5. (Russia) Nikolay Davydenko (third round, withdrew due to a broken wrist)
6. (Sweden) Robin Söderling (semifinals)
7. (United States) Andy Roddick (final)
8. (Croatia) Marin Čilić (second round)
9. (France) Jo-Wilfried Tsonga (fourth round)
10. (Spain) Fernando Verdasco (third round)
11. (Spain) Juan Carlos Ferrero (third round)
12. (France) Gaël Monfils (second round)
13. (Spain) David Ferrer (second round)
14. (Czech Republic) Radek Štěpánek (second round)
15. (United States) John Isner (fourth round)
16. (France) Gilles Simon (second round)
17. (United States) Sam Querrey (third round)
18. (Spain) Tommy Robredo (quarterfinals)
19. (Czech Republic) Tomáš Berdych (quarterfinals)
20. (Croatia) Ivan Ljubičić (champion)
21. (Argentina) Juan Mónaco (quarterfinals)
22. (Austria) Jürgen Melzer (fourth round)
23. (Croatia) Ivo Karlović (second round)
24. (Spain) Albert Montañés (third round)
25. (Germany) Philipp Kohlschreiber (third round)
26. (Brazil) Thomaz Bellucci (third round)
27. (Cyprus) Marcos Baghdatis (fourth round)
28. (Spain) Feliciano López (third round)
29. (Serbia) Viktor Troicki (fourth round)
30. (Serbia) Janko Tipsarević (second round, retired due to an abdominal strain)
31. (France) Julien Benneteau (second round)
32. (Russia) Igor Andreev (second round)

== Draw ==
Key

- Q = Qualifier
- WC = Wild card
- LL = Lucky loser
- Alt = Alternate
- ITF = ITF entry
- PR = Protected ranking
- SR = Special ranking
- SE = Special exempt
- JE = Junior exempt
- JR = Junior Accelerator Programme entrant
- CO = College Accelerator Programme entrant
- NG = Next Gen Accelerator Program entrant
- w/o = Walkover
- r = Retired
- d = Defaulted

=== Finals ===
Quarterfinals
18	(Spain) Tommy Robredo	3	5
7	(United States) Andy Roddick	6	7
4	(United Kingdom) Andy Murray	1	6^{4}
6	(Sweden) Robin Söderling	6	7^{7}
19	(Czech Republic) Tomáš Berdych	4	6^{4}
3	(Spain) Rafael Nadal	6	7^{7}
21	(Argentina) Juan Mónaco	6	2	1
20	(Croatia) Ivan Ljubičić	4	6	6

Semifinals
7	(United States) Andy Roddick	6	3	6
6	(Sweden) Robin Söderling	4	6	3
3	(Spain) Rafael Nadal	6	4	6^{1}
20	(Croatia) Ivan Ljubičić	3	6	7^{7}

Final
7	(United States) Andy Roddick	6^{3}	6^{5}
20	(Croatia) Ivan Ljubičić	7^{7}	7^{7}

=== Top half ===
==== Section 1 ====
First round
(Romania) V Hănescu	6	7^{7}
(Argentina) JI Chela	3	6^{4}
(France) A Clément	4	6	6
(Australia) P Luczak	6	3	2
(Ukraine) S Stakhovsky	6	6
(United States) W Odesnik	1	4
(Israel) D Sela	6	6
WC	(United States) J Levine	2	2

Second round
1	(Switzerland) R Federer	6	6^{5}	6
(Romania) V Hănescu	3	7^{7}	1
(France) A Clément	6^{7}	1
27	(Cyprus) M Baghdatis	7^{9}	6
18	(Spain) T Robredo	3	6	7
(Ukraine) S Stakhovsky	6	3	5
(Israel) D Sela	6	1	6
14	(Czech Republic) R Štěpánek	4	6	2

Third round
1	(Switzerland) R Federer	7	5	6^{4}
27	(Cyprus) M Baghdatis	5	7	7^{7}
18	(Spain) T Robredo	6	6
(Israel) D Sela	3	0

Fourth round
27	(Cyprus) M Baghdatis	5	6	4
18	(Spain) T Robredo	7	0	6

==== Section 2 ====
First round
(France) R Gasquet	6^{6}	6^{7}
(Germany) S Greul	7^{8}	7^{9}
Q	(Austria) S Koubek	2	6^{2}
WC	(Argentina) D Nalbandian	6	7^{7}
(Netherlands) T de Bakker	6	6
(Brazil) M Daniel	3	3
Q	(Chinese Taipei) Y-h Lu	6	6
(Spain) Ó Hernández	1	2

Second round
12	(France) G Monfils	6	2	3
(Germany) S Greul	1	6	6
WC	(Argentina) D Nalbandian	4	1
22	(Austria) J Melzer	6	6
30	(Serbia) J Tipsarević	2^{r}
(Netherlands) T de Bakker	3
Q	(Chinese Taipei) Y-h Lu	4	4
7	(United States) A Roddick	6	6

Third round
(Germany) S Greul
22	(Austria) J Melzer	w/o
(Netherlands) T de Bakker	3	4
7	(United States) A Roddick	6	6

Fourth round
22	(Austria) J Melzer	6^{5}	4
7	(United States) A Roddick	7^{7}	6

==== Section 3 ====
First round
WC	(United States) R Ginepri	6	6^{5}	3
(Italy) A Seppi	2	7^{7}	6
(Italy) P Lorenzi	2	5
(United States) M Russell	6	7
(Spain) N Almagro	6	6
(Germany) M Zverev	3	2
(United States) J Blake	6	6
(Spain) D Gimeno Traver	3	2

Second round
4	(United Kingdom) A Murray	6	6
(Italy) A Seppi	4	4
(United States) M Russell	4	6	6
32	(Russia) I Andreev	6	3	2
23	(Croatia) I Karlović	5	6^{5}
(Spain) N Almagro	7	7^{7}
(United States) J Blake	6	6
13	(Spain) D Ferrer	1	4

Third round
4	(United Kingdom) A Murray	6	7
(United States) M Russell	3	5
(Spain) N Almagro	6	3	6
(United States) J Blake	4	6	3

Fourth round
4	(United Kingdom) A Murray	6	1
(Spain) N Almagro	2	0^{r}

==== Section 4 ====
First round
(France) M Llodra	3	0
Q	(Australia) M Matosevic	6	6
Q	(Brazil) R Mello	2	6	6
(Argentina) H Zeballos	6	3	4
(France) P-H Mathieu	6	6
(Germany) B Becker	3	1
(Germany) F Mayer	3	2
(Kazakhstan) E Korolev	6	6

Second round
9	(France) J-W Tsonga	6	6
Q	(Australia) M Matosevic	1	3
Q	(Brazil) R Mello	6	4	4
24	(Spain) A Montañés	3	6	6
28	(Spain) F López	3	6	6
(France) P-H Mathieu	6	3	4
(Kazakhstan) E Korolev	2	4
6	(Sweden) R Söderling	6	6

Third round
9	(France) J-W Tsonga	4	6	6
24	(Spain) A Montañés	6	3	3
28	(Spain) F López	6^{3}	4
6	(Sweden) R Söderling	7^{7}	6

Fourth round
9	(France) J-W Tsonga	3	4
6	(Sweden) R Söderling	6	6

=== Bottom half ===
==== Section 5 ====
First round
(Switzerland) M Chiudinelli	6	3	3
(Latvia) E Gulbis	3	6	6
(Uruguay) P Cuevas	6	7
(Portugal) F Gil	4	5
(Colombia) A Falla	1	2
(France) F Serra	6	6
Q	(Paraguay) R Delgado	6^{2}	6	6
(Germany) A Beck	7^{7}	2	4

Second round
5	(Russia) N Davydenko	6	6
(Latvia) E Gulbis	4	4
(Uruguay) P Cuevas	0^{r}
29	(Serbia) V Troicki	1
19	(Czech Republic) T Berdych	7	4	6
(France) F Serra	5	6	4
Q	(Paraguay) R Delgado	4	1
10	(Spain) F Verdasco	6	6

Third round
5	(Russia) N Davydenko
29	(Serbia) V Troicki	w/o
19	(Czech Republic) T Berdych	6	6
10	(Spain) F Verdasco	0	3

Fourth round
29	(Serbia) V Troicki	1	3
19	(Czech Republic) T Berdych	6	6

==== Section 6 ====
First round
Q	(Germany) B Phau	3	3
Q	(South Africa) K Anderson	6	6
(Italy) P Starace	1	1^{r}
(France) J Chardy	6	4
Q	(United States) B Reynolds	6	3	4
PR	(Croatia) M Ančić	4	6	6
Q	(Brazil) T Alves	5	0
Q	(Germany) R Schüttler	7	6

Second round
15	(United States) J Isner	6	7
Q	(South Africa) K Anderson	3	5
(France) J Chardy	3	4
17	(United States) S Querrey	6	6
31	(France) J Benneteau	6	6^{5}	3
PR	(Croatia) M Ančić	4	7^{7}	6
Q	(Germany) R Schüttler	4	4
3	(Spain) R Nadal	6	6

Third round
15	(United States) J Isner	7^{7}	6
17	(United States) S Querrey	6^{3}	4
PR	(Croatia) M Ančić	2	2
3	(Spain) R Nadal	6	6

Fourth round
15	(United States) J Isner	5	6	3
3	(Spain) R Nadal	7	3	6

==== Section 7 ====
First round
(Spain) G García López	4	6	7
(Slovakia) L Lacko	6	4	5
WC	(Spain) C Moyá	7^{9}	7^{7}
Q	(United States) T Smyczek	6^{7}	6^{5}
(Belgium) O Rochus	4	6	5
(Italy) F Fognini	6	1	7
(United States) R Ram	1	3
(Austria) D Köllerer	6	6

Second round
8	(Croatia) M Čilić	6^{1}	0
(Spain) G García López	7^{7}	6
WC	(Spain) C Moyá
26	(Brazil) T Bellucci	w/o
21	(Argentina) J Mónaco	6	7
(Italy) F Fognini	4	5
(Austria) D Köllerer	3	0
11	(Spain) JC Ferrero	6	6

Third round
(Spain) G García López	4	6	6
26	(Brazil) T Bellucci	6	2	1
21	(Argentina) J Mónaco	7^{7}	3	6
11	(Spain) JC Ferrero	6^{2}	6	3

Fourth round
(Spain) G García López	6	2	1
21	(Argentina) J Mónaco	3	6	6

==== Section 8 ====
First round
(Argentina) L Mayer	6^{4}	2
Q	(Argentina) B Dabul	7^{7}	6
(United States) T Dent	3	4
WC	(United States) R Harrison	6	6
(Belgium) C Rochus	2	5
(Germany) P Petzschner	6	7
(Germany) M Berrer	6	1	3
(United States) M Fish	1	6	6

Second round
16	(France) G Simon	5	4
Q	(Argentina) B Dabul	7	6
WC	(United States) R Harrison	2	6^{2}
20	(Croatia) I Ljubičić	6	7^{7}
25	(Germany) P Kohlschreiber	6	6
(Germany) P Petzschner	3	2
(United States) M Fish	1	6	2
2	(Serbia) N Djokovic	6	0	6

Third round
Q	(Argentina) B Dabul	2	3
20	(Croatia) I Ljubičić	6	6
25	(Germany) P Kohlschreiber	3	6	6^{5}
2	(Serbia) N Djokovic	6	2	7^{7}

Fourth round
20	(Croatia) I Ljubičić	7	6
2	(Serbia) N Djokovic	5	3

== Qualifying ==
=== Seeds ===
1. (Uzbekistan) Denis Istomin (first round, retired due to left heel injury)
2. (Ukraine) Illya Marchenko (first round)
3. (Germany) Rainer Schüttler (qualified)
4. (Germany) Daniel Brands (qualifying competition)
5. (Chinese Taipei) Lu Yen-hsun (qualified)
6. (Brazil) Ricardo Mello (qualified)
7. (Germany) Björn Phau (qualified)
8. (Australia) Carsten Ball (first round)
9. (India) Somdev Devvarman (qualifying competition)
10. (Jamaica) Dustin Brown (first round)
11. (United States) Kevin Kim (qualifying competition)
12. (South Africa) Kevin Anderson (qualified)
13. (Brazil) Thiago Alves (qualified)
14. (Austria) Stefan Koubek (qualified)
15. (United States) Robert Kendrick (first round)
16. (United States) Michael Yani (first round)
17. (United States) Donald Young (qualifying competition)
18. (United States) Ryan Sweeting (qualifying competition)
19. (Paraguay) Ramón Delgado (qualified)
20. (Argentina) Gastón Gaudio (first round)
21. (Germany) Dieter Kindlmann (qualifying competition)
22. (Argentina) Brian Dabul (qualified)
23. (Mexico) Santiago González (first round)
24. (United States) Jesse Witten (qualifying competition)

=== Qualifiers ===
1. (United States) Bobby Reynolds
2. (Australia) Marinko Matosevic
3. (Germany) Rainer Schüttler
4. (Paraguay) Ramón Delgado
5. (Chinese Taipei) Lu Yen-hsun
6. (Brazil) Ricardo Mello
7. (Germany) Björn Phau
8. (Brazil) Thiago Alves
9. (Austria) Stefan Koubek
10. (United States) Tim Smyczek
11. (Argentina) Brian Dabul
12. (South Africa) Kevin Anderson

=== Draw ===
Key

- Q = Qualifier
- WC = Wild card
- LL = Lucky loser
- Alt = Alternate
- ITF = ITF entry
- PR = Protected ranking
- SR = Special ranking
- SE = Special exempt
- JE = Junior exempt
- JR = Junior Accelerator Programme entrant
- CO = College Accelerator Programme entrant
- NG = Next Gen Accelerator Program entrant
- w/o = Walkover
- r = Retired
- d = Defaulted

==== First qualifier ====
First round
1	(Uzbekistan) Denis Istomin	4	1^{r}
(United States) Bobby Reynolds	6	3
(United States) Lester Cook	6	6
16	(United States) Michael Yani	3	4

Qualifying competition
(United States) Bobby Reynolds	6	7
(United States) Lester Cook	4	5

==== Second qualifier ====
First round
2	(Ukraine) Illya Marchenko	7^{9}	4	6^{4}
(Australia) Marinko Matosevic	6^{7}	6	7^{7}
(Slovenia) Luka Gregorc	5	4
17	(United States) Donald Young	7	6

Qualifying competition
(Australia) Marinko Matosevic	6	4	7^{10}
17	(United States) Donald Young	4	6	6^{8}

==== Third qualifier ====
First round
3	(Germany) Rainer Schüttler	6	6
(Russia) Alex Bogomolov Jr.	4	3
(Ecuador) Giovanni Lapentti	7	7
23	(Mexico) Santiago González	5	5

Qualifying competition
3	(Germany) Rainer Schüttler	4	6	6
(Ecuador) Giovanni Lapentti	6	1	4

==== Fourth qualifier ====
First round
4	(Germany) Daniel Brands	6	6
(South Korea) Im Kyu-tae	2	2
(United States) Michael McClune	4	3
19	(Paraguay) Ramón Delgado	6	6

Qualifying competition
4	(Germany) Daniel Brands	3	4
19	(Paraguay) Ramón Delgado	6	6

==== Fifth qualifier ====
First round
5	(Chinese Taipei) Lu Yen-hsun	6	6
WC	(Moldova) Roman Borvanov	3	4
WC	(United States) Brian Battistone	6	2	4
24	(United States) Jesse Witten	3	6	6

Qualifying competition
5	(Chinese Taipei) Lu Yen-hsun	6	6
(United States) Jesse Witten	2	1

==== Sixth qualifier ====
First round
6	(Brazil) Ricardo Mello	6	6
(Belgium) Dick Norman	3	1
(Australia) Nick Lindahl	2	6	6
15	(United States) Robert Kendrick	6	4	4

Qualifying competition
6	(Brazil) Ricardo Mello	6	4	6
(Australia) Nick Lindahl	2	6	4

==== Seventh qualifier ====
First round
7	(Germany) Björn Phau	6	7^{7}
WC	(Venezuela) José de Armas	2	6^{4}
(Slovakia) Ivo Klec	6^{4}	1
21	(Germany) Dieter Kindlmann	7^{7}	6

Qualifying competition
7	(Germany) Björn Phau	6	7
21	(Germany) Dieter Kindlmann	1	5

==== Eighth qualifier ====
First round
8	(Australia) Carsten Ball	6	6
(France) Vincent Millot	4	3
WC	(Chile) Vincent Spadea	6	6^{4}	6
13	(Brazil) Thiago Alves	1	7^{7}	0

Qualifying competition
(France) Vincent Millot	1	6	2
13	(Brazil) Thiago Alves	6	3	6

==== Ninth qualifier ====
First round
9	(India) Somdev Devvarman	6	3	6
(United States) Alex Kuznetsov	4	6	0
(France) Sébastien de Chaunac	3	3
14	(Austria) Stefan Koubek	6	6

Qualifying competition
9	(India) Somdev Devvarman	3	1
14	(Austria) Stefan Koubek	6	6

==== Tenth qualifier ====
First round
10	(Jamaica) Dustin Brown	1	1
(United States) Tim Smyczek	6	6
WC	(Serbia) Filip Krajinović	6^{2}	7	7
20	(Argentina) Gastón Gaudio	7^{7}	5	5

Qualifying competition
(United States) Tim Smyczek	6	6
WC	(Serbia) Filip Krajinović	1	0

==== Eleventh qualifier ====
First round
11	(United States) Kevin Kim	6	6
(United States) Brendan Evans	0	1
(India) Prakash Amritraj	2	4
22	(Argentina) Brian Dabul	6	6

Qualifying competition
(United States) Kevin Kim	1	4
(Argentina) Brian Dabul	6	6

==== Twelfth qualifier ====
First round
12	(South Africa) Kevin Anderson	6	7^{7}
(France) Sébastien Grosjean	3	6^{5}
(South Africa) Rik de Voest	4	2
18	(United States) Ryan Sweeting	6	6

Qualifying competition
12	(South Africa) Kevin Anderson	6	7^{9}
18	(United States) Ryan Sweeting	3	6^{7}
