= Treat Huey =

Filipino former tennis player specializing in doubles

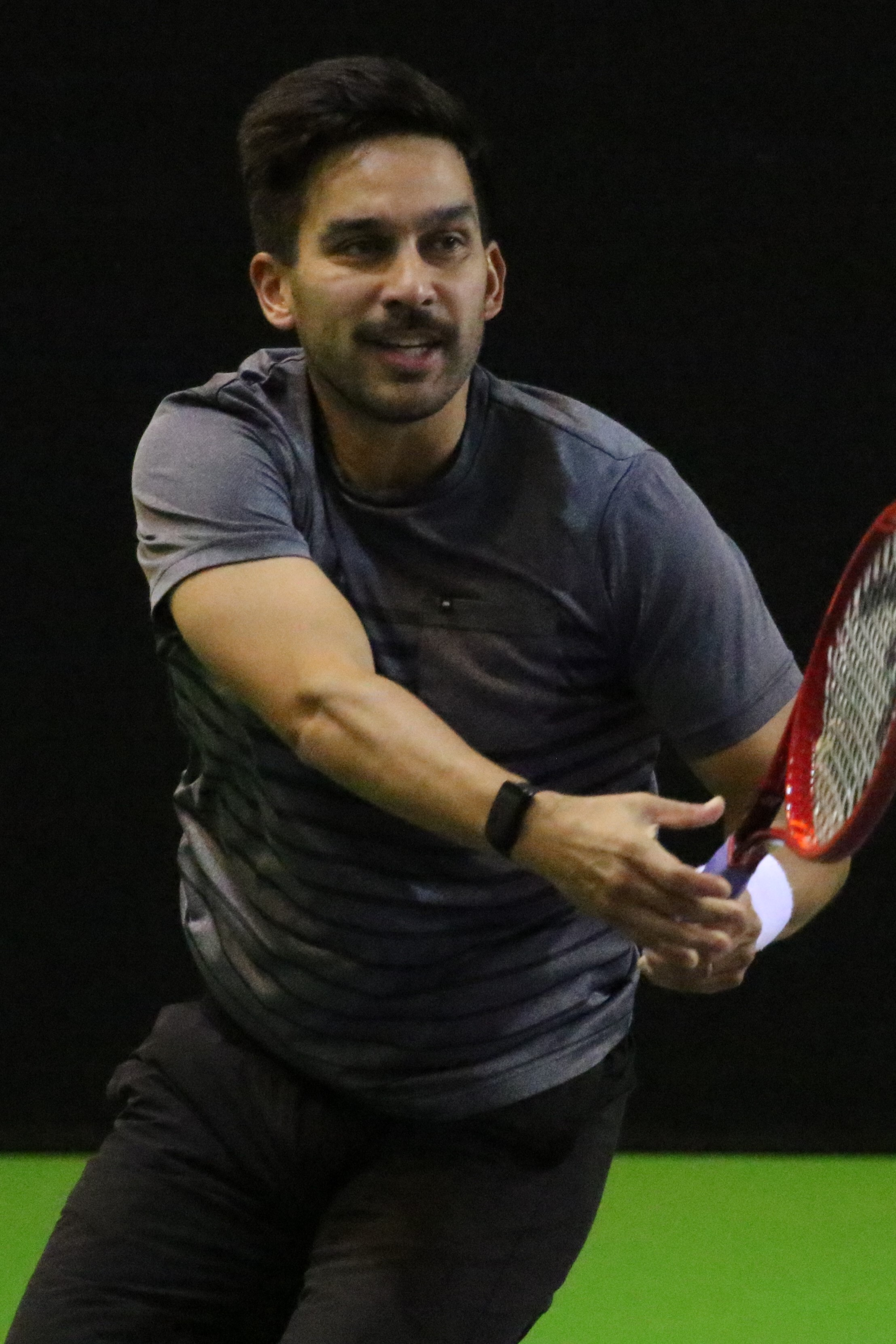
- Huey in 2021
- Full name: Treat Conrad San Pedro Huey
- Country (sports): Philippines
- Residence: Makati, Metro Manila, Philippines; Alexandria, Virginia, US
- Born: August 28, 1985 (age 41) Washington, D.C., US
- Height: 1.78 m (5 ft 10 in)
- Turned pro: 2008
- Retired: 2023
- Plays: Left-handed
- College: University of Virginia
- Prize money: US$1,566,869
- Official website: treathuey.com

Singles
- Career record: 9–7
- Career titles: 0
- Highest ranking: No. 689 (30 November 2009)

Doubles
- Career record: 191–170
- Career titles: 8
- Highest ranking: No. 18 (11 July 2016)

Grand Slam doubles results
- Australian Open: QF (2014, 2016)
- French Open: 3R (2012, 2013, 2016)
- Wimbledon: SF (2016)
- US Open: QF (2013)

Other doubles tournaments
- Tour Finals: RR (2016)

Grand Slam mixed doubles results
- Australian Open: SF (2016)
- French Open: 1R (2013, 2014, 2016, 2017)
- Wimbledon: 2R (2013, 2016)
- US Open: 2R (2013)
Medal record
Men's Tennis
Representing Philippines
Southeast Asian Games
| Gold medal – first place | 2009 Vientiane | Team |
| Gold medal – first place | 2011 Jakarta-Palembang | Mixed doubles |
| Gold medal – first place | 2015 Singapore | Mixed doubles |
| Silver medal – second place | 2009 Vientiane | Singles |
| Silver medal – second place | 2009 Vientiane | Doubles |
| Silver medal – second place | 2011 Jakarta-Palembang | Doubles |
| Silver medal – second place | 2011 Jakarta-Palembang | Team |
| Silver medal – second place | 2019 Philippines | Doubles |
| Bronze medal – third place | 2009 Vientiane | Mixed doubles |
| Bronze medal – third place | 2015 Singapore | Doubles |
| Bronze medal – third place | 2015 Singapore | Team |
| Bronze medal – third place | 2021 Vietnam | Mixed doubles |
| Bronze medal – third place | 2021 Vietnam | Team |
- Last updated on: 19 September 2022.

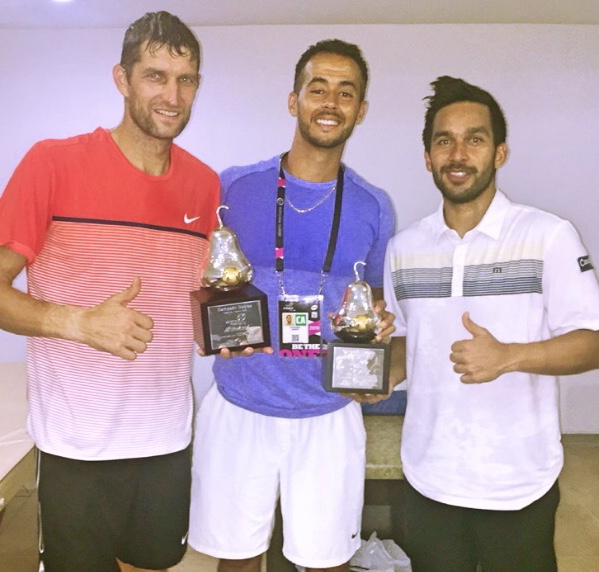
Treat Huey (right) with his Coach Othmane Garma and doubles partner Max Mirnyi after winning the Mexican Open 2016

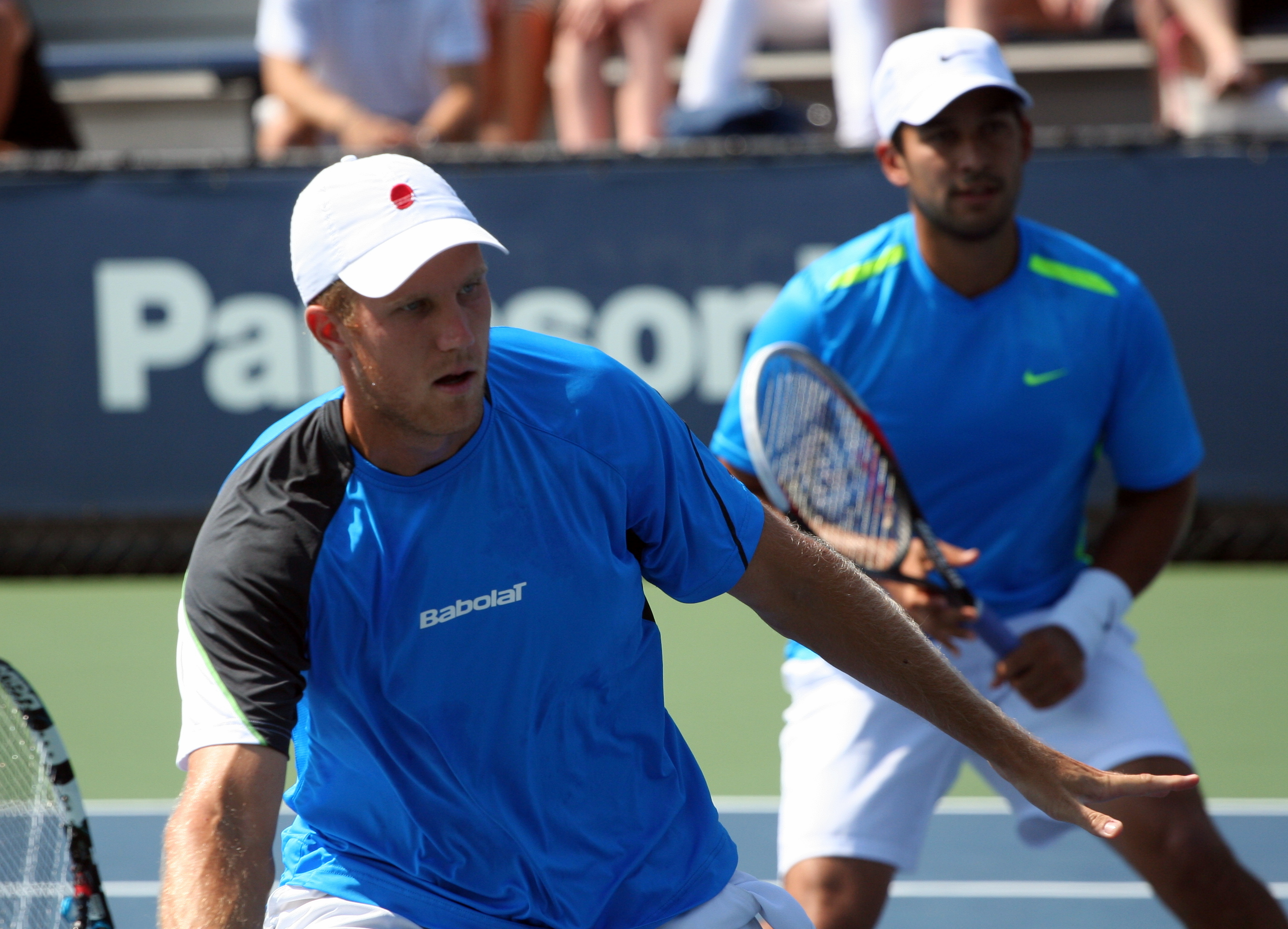
Huey (right) with partner Inglot at the 2012 US Open

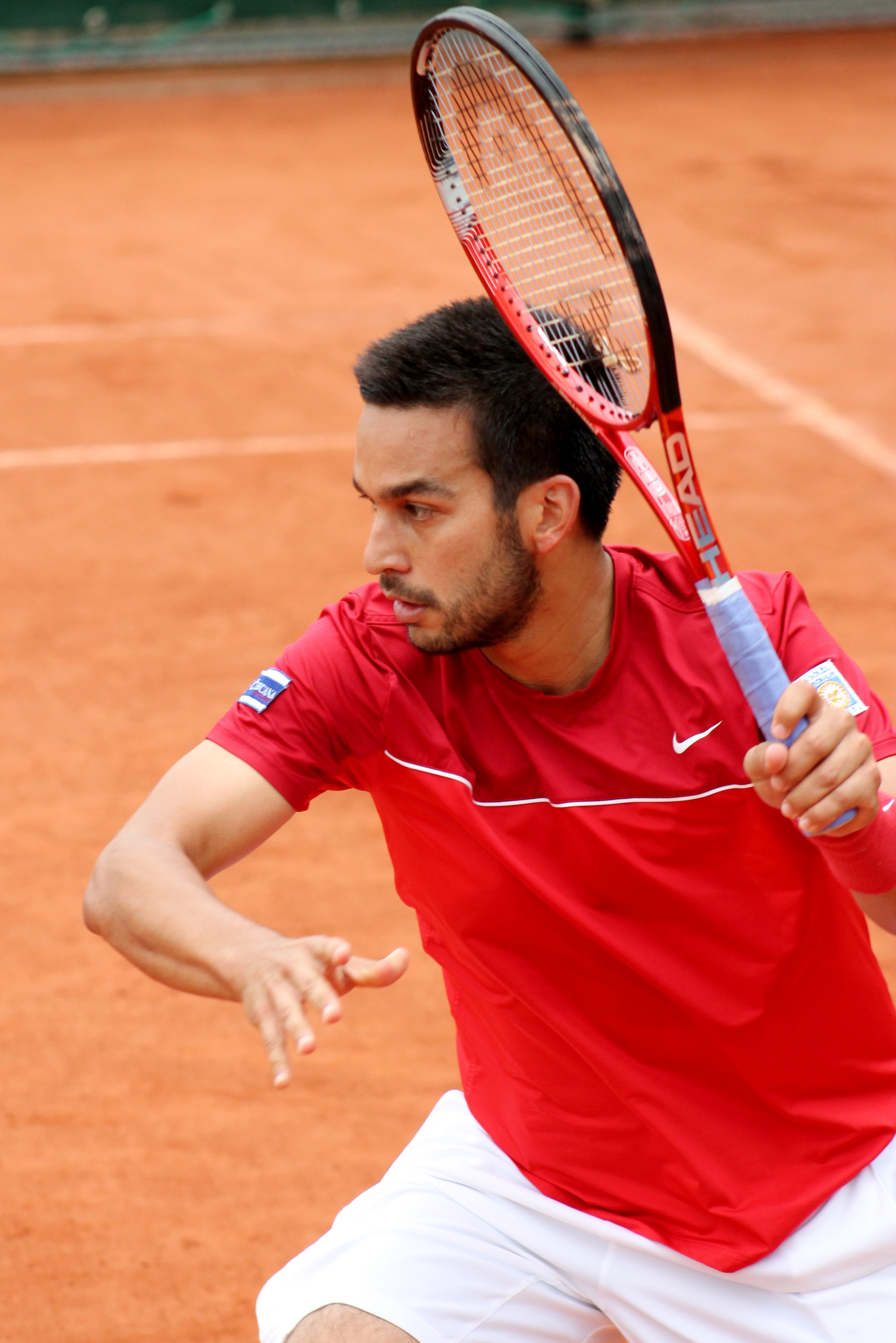
Huey at the 2013 French Open

Treat Conrad San Pedro Huey (/ˈtrɛt ˈhjuːi/; born August 28, 1985) is a Filipino former professional tennis player who specialized in doubles. He reached 18 finals, winning 8 titles on the ATP World Tour. He won titles at the 2012 Citi Open, 2013 Swiss Indoors, and 2014 Aegon International alongside Dominic Inglot, 2015 Estoril Open with Scott Lipsky, 2015 St. Petersburg Open and 2015 Malaysian Open, Kuala Lumpur with Henri Kontinen, 2016 Abierto Mexicano Telcel with Max Mirnyi and the 2017 Los Cabos Open with Juan Sebastián Cabal. He turned professional in 2008 and he started representing the Philippines in the Davis Cup and the Southeast Asian Games in 2009.

Huey reached his career-high doubles ranking of world No. 18 in July 2016. Among his partners were Somdev Devvarman, Brian Battistone, Jeff Coetzee, Harsh Mankad, Jerzy Janowicz, Dominic Inglot, Jack Sock, Jonathan Erlich, Scott Lipsky, Max Mirnyi and Henri Kontinen.

In 2012, Huey became a member of the World Team Tennis' Washington Kastles. Huey also participated in the International Premier Tennis League (IPTL). Treat Huey participated as coach and player in the IPTL with the Philippine Mavericks.

He is the first Filipino player to reach the doubles semifinals at the Wimbledon Championships partnering Belarusian Max Mirnyi.

He is also the first Filipino player, with partner Max Mirnyi, to reach the top 8 doubles team to compete in 2016 ATP Yearend Finals in London.

On July 1, 2023, Huey returned to his college alma mater, University of Virginia, as Assistant Coach of UVA Men's Tennis.

Huey played his first and last ATP tournaments at the Citi Open in his hometown Washington, D.C.

On July 31, the 2023 Mubadala Citi DC Open tournament organizers held a Retirement Ceremony in Huey's honor with his family, fellow ATP doubles players, his ATP coach and his coach from JTCC where he trained as a junior.

== Career highlights ==
=== 2015: New partnership, Three ATP titles ===
Huey started the year by reaching the Australian Open third round alongside Jonathan Erlich, losing to Feliciano López and Max Mirnyi in straight sets.

He then reached the semifinals of the 2015 Ecuador Open Quito with new partner Scott Lipsky, losing to Víctor Estrella Burgos and João Souza in two tiebreak sets. He then reached the semifinals of the 2015 Memphis Open with Lipsky, losing to Artem Sitak and Donald Young in two tight sets. He continued his good run of form at the 2015 Delray Beach International Tennis Championships, reaching the quarterfinals with Lipsky but losing to Raven Klaasen and Leander Paes in straight sets. He then lost in the first round of the 2015 Abierto Mexicano Telcel with Lipsky, losing to Ivan Dodig and Marcelo Melo in straight sets.

He then represented the Philippines at the 2015 Davis Cup partnering Francis Casey Alcantara. The defeated Sri Lanka's Sharmal Dissanayake and Dineshkanthan Thangarajah. The Philippines went on to win the tie 5–0.

He went on to play the 2015 Irving Challenger, reaching the quarterfinals with partner Lipsky, losing to Pablo Andújar and Diego Schwartzman in straight sets. He then reached the final of the 2015 US Men's Clay Court Championships with Lipsky, losing to Ričardas Berankis and Teymuraz Gabashvili in straight sets. He went on to play the 2015 Sarasota Challenger, but he and Lipsky were forced to retire in their quarterfinal match with Hyeon Chung and Divij Sharan leading 7–6^{(6)}, 0–1. They next played the 2015 BRD Năstase Țiriac Trophy, losing to Colin Fleming and Jonathan Marray in three sets in the quarterfinals.

Huey and Lipsky then went on to win their first team title and the fourth of Huey's career at the 2015 Estoril Open against top seeds Marc López and David Marrero. Huey and Lipsky next participated at the 2015 Geneva Open reaching the semifinals losing to Raven Klaasen and Yen-Hsun Lu in two tight sets. They then competed at the 2015 French Open losing in the first round to Marin Draganja and Henri Kontinen in three sets.

He then participated at a Challenger event in Ilkley, Great Britain with Somdev Devvarman losing in the first round to Johan Brunström and Matwé Middelkoop in three sets. He next competed with regular partner Scott Lipsky at the 2015 Aegon Open Nottingham losing in the first round to top seeds Marcel Granollers and Leander Paes in three sets. In July, Huey and Lipsky then played at the 2015 Wimbledon Championships beating 12th seeds Pablo Cuevas and David Marrero in straight sets before going on to lose to Jonathan Erlich and Philipp Petzschner. He then travelled to Taiwan to play the 2015 Davis Cup Asia/Oceana group II 2nd round against Chinese Taipei in which he partnered compatriot Ruben Gonzales to win the doubles rubber.

He went on to win two more titles at the 2015 St. Petersburg Open in September and at the 2015 Malaysian Open, Kuala Lumpur in October with Henri Kontinen.

== Significant finals ==
=== Masters 1000 finals ===
==== Doubles: 1 (1 runner-up) ====
| Outcome | Year | Championship | Surface | Partner | Opponents | Score |
|---|---|---|---|---|---|---|
| Loss | 2013 | Indian Wells | Hard | (Poland) Jerzy Janowicz | (United States) Bob Bryan (United States) Mike Bryan | 3–6, 6–3, [6–10] |

== ATP career finals ==
=== Doubles: 18 (8 titles, 10 runner-ups) ===
| Legend Grand Slam tournaments (0–0) ATP World Tour Finals (0–0) ATP World Tour Masters 1000 (0–1) ATP World Tour 500 Series (3–1) ATP World Tour 250 Series (5–8) | Finals by surface Hard (6–6) Clay (1–3) Grass (1–1) | Finals by setting Outdoor (6–8) Indoor (2–2) |

| Result | W–L | Date | Tournament | Tier | Surface | Partner | Opponents | Score |
|---|---|---|---|---|---|---|---|---|
| Loss | 0–1 | Jul 2011 | Los Angeles Open, United States | 250 Series | Hard | (India) Somdev Devvarman | (The Bahamas) Mark Knowles (Belgium) Xavier Malisse | 6–7^{(3–7)}, 6–7^{(10–12)} |
| Loss | 0–2 | Apr 2012 | U.S. Men's Clay Court Championships, United States | 250 Series | Clay | (United Kingdom) Dominic Inglot | (United States) James Blake (United States) Sam Querrey | 6–7^{(14–16)}, 4–6 |
| Loss | 0–3 | Jun 2012 | Halle Open, Germany | 250 Series | Grass | (United States) Scott Lipsky | (Pakistan) Aisam-ul-Haq Qureshi (Netherlands) Jean-Julien Rojer | 3–6, 4–6 |
| Win | 1–3 | Aug 2012 | Washington Open, United States | 500 Series | Hard | (United Kingdom) Dominic Inglot | (South Africa) Kevin Anderson (United States) Sam Querrey | 7–6^{(9–7)}, 6–7^{(9–11)}, [10–5] |
| Loss | 1–4 | Oct 2012 | Swiss Indoors, Switzerland | 500 Series | Hard (i) | (United Kingdom) Dominic Inglot | (Canada) Daniel Nestor (Serbia) Nenad Zimonjić | 5–7, 7–6^{(7–4)}, [5–10] |
| Loss | 1–5 | Mar 2013 | Indian Wells Masters, United States | Masters 1000 | Hard | (Poland) Jerzy Janowicz | (United States) Bob Bryan (United States) Mike Bryan | 3–6, 6–3, [6–10] |
| Loss | 1–6 | May 2013 | Düsseldorf Open, Germany | 250 Series | Clay | (United Kingdom) Dominic Inglot | (Germany) Andre Begemann (Germany) Martin Emmrich | 5–7, 2–6 |
| Loss | 1–7 | Aug 2013 | Winston-Salem Open, United States | 250 Series | Hard | (United Kingdom) Dominic Inglot | (Canada) Daniel Nestor (India) Leander Paes | 6–7^{(10–12)}, 5–7 |
| Win | 2–7 | Oct 2013 | Swiss Indoors, Switzerland | 500 Series | Hard (i) | (United Kingdom) Dominic Inglot | (Austria) Julian Knowle (Austria) Oliver Marach | 6–3, 3–6, [10–4] |
| Win | 3–7 | Jun 2014 | Eastbourne International, United Kingdom | 250 Series | Grass | (United Kingdom) Dominic Inglot | (Austria) Alexander Peya (Brazil) Bruno Soares | 7–5, 5–7, [10–8] |
| Loss | 3–8 | Oct 2014 | Stockholm Open, Sweden | 250 Series | Hard (i) | (United States) Jack Sock | (United States) Eric Butorac (South Africa) Raven Klaasen | 4–6, 3–6 |
| Loss | 3–9 | Apr 2015 | U.S. Men's Clay Court Championships, United States (2) | 250 Series | Clay | (United States) Scott Lipsky | (Lithuania) Ričardas Berankis (Russia) Teymuraz Gabashvili | 4–6, 4–6 |
| Win | 4–9 | May 2015 | Estoril Open, Portugal | 250 Series | Clay | (United States) Scott Lipsky | (Spain) Marc López (Spain) David Marrero | 6–1, 6–4 |
| Win | 5–9 | Sep 2015 | St. Petersburg Open, Russia | 250 Series | Hard | (Finland) Henri Kontinen | (Austria) Julian Knowle (Austria) Alexander Peya | 7–5, 6–3 |
| Win | 6–9 | Oct 2015 | Malaysian Open, Malaysia | 250 Series | Hard (i) | (Finland) Henri Kontinen | (South Africa) Raven Klaasen (United States) Rajeev Ram | 7–6^{(7–4)}, 6–2 |
| Win | 7–9 | Feb 2016 | Mexican Open, Mexico | 500 Series | Hard | (Belarus) Max Mirnyi | (Germany) Philipp Petzschner (Austria) Alexander Peya | 7–6^{(7–5)}, 6–3 |
| Loss | 7–10 | Feb 2017 | Delray Beach Open, United States | 250 Series | Hard | (Belarus) Max Mirnyi | (South Africa) Raven Klaasen (United States) Rajeev Ram | 7–5, 7–5 |
| Win | 8–10 | Aug 2017 | Los Cabos Open, Mexico | 250 Series | Hard | (Colombia) Juan Sebastián Cabal | (Peru) Sergio Galdós (Venezuela) Roberto Maytín | 6–2, 6–3 |

== Challenger and Futures finals ==
=== Doubles: 52 (29 titles, 23 runner-ups) ===
| Legend (doubles) ATP Challenger Tour (21–17) ITF Futures Tour (8–6) | Finals by surface Hard (17–19) Clay (10–2) Grass (1–2) Carpet (1–0) |

| Result | W–L | Date | Tournament | Tier | Surface | Partner | Opponents | Score |
|---|---|---|---|---|---|---|---|---|
| Win | 1–0 | Jul 2005 | USA F15, Buffalo | Futures | Clay | (South Africa) Izak van der Merwe | (United States) Tres Davis (United States) Nicholas Monroe | 6–3, 6–4 |
| Win | 2–0 | Jan 2007 | USA F1, Tampa | Futures | Hard | (India) Somdev Devvarman | (United States) James Cerretani (Mexico) Antonio Ruiz-Rosales | 6–0, 7–6^{(9–7)} |
| Win | 3–0 | Jan 2008 | USA F1, Wesley Chapel | Futures | Hard | (India) Somdev Devvarman | (Czech Republic) Ladislav Chramosta (Czech Republic) Daniel Lustig | 6–2, 6–2 |
| Win | 4–0 | Jun 2008 | USA F15, Rochester | Futures | Clay | (India) Somdev Devvarman | (United States) Bryan Koniecko (United States) Justin Kronauge | 6–1, 4–6, [12–10] |
| Win | 5–0 | Jul 2008 | USA F16, Pittsburgh | Futures | Clay | (India) Somdev Devvarman | (United States) Adam El Mihdawy (United States) Rhyne Williams | 6–3, 6–2 |
| Win | 6–0 | Aug 2008 | Ecuador F3, Guayaquil | Futures | Hard | (Italy) Luigi D'Agord | (United States) Austin Karosi (United States) Shane La Porte | 6–2, 6–1 |
| Loss | 6–1 | Sep 2008 | USA F22, Claremont | Futures | Hard | (United States) Brett Ross | (United States) Marcus Fugate (United States) Nima Roshan | 4–6, 6–4, [10–12] |
| Loss | 6–2 | Sep 2008 | USA F23, Costa Mesa | Futures | Hard | (United States) Brett Ross | (United States) Zack Fleishman (United States) Michael McClune | 2–6, 2–6 |
| Loss | 6–3 | Oct 2008 | USA F23, Laguna Niguel | Futures | Hard | (United States) Sheeva Parbhu | (United States) Colt Gaston (United States) Ryan Rowe | 4–6, 7–6^{(7–4)}, [6–10] |
| Loss | 6–4 | Feb 2009 | Mexico F2, Naucalpan | Futures | Hard | (United States) Greg Ouellette | (Mexico) Luis Díaz Barriga (Mexico) Antonio Ruiz-Rosales | 3–6, 2–6 |
| Loss | 6–5 | Mar 2009 | USA F5, Harlingen | Futures | Hard | (United States) Todd Paul | (Mexico) Javier Herrera-Eguiluz (United States) Jarmere Jenkins | 6–1, 2–6, [8–10] |
| Loss | 6–6 | Apr 2009 | USA F7, Mobile | Futures | Hard | (United States) Lester Cook | (Canada) Philip Bester (Canada) Milos Raonic | 3–6, 6–1, [5–10] |
| Win | 7–6 | May 2009 | USA F9, Vero Beach | Futures | Clay | (United States) Greg Ouellette | (Italy) Andrea Falgheri (Italy) Stefano Ianni | 6–2, 6–2 |
| Win | 8–6 | Jun 2009 | USA F13, Sacramento | Futures | Hard | (United States) Lester Cook | (Australia) Andrew Coelho (Australia) Adam Feeney | 6–4, 3–6, [10–2] |
| Loss | 8–7 | Sep 2009 | Como, Italy | Challenger | Clay | (India) Harsh Mankad | (Italy) Marco Crugnola (Italy) Alessandro Motti | 6–7^{(3–7)}, 2–6 |
| Win | 9–7 | Sep 2009 | Seville, Spain | Challenger | Clay | (India) Harsh Mankad | (Italy) Alberto Brizzi (Italy) Simone Vagnozzi | 6–1, 7–5 |
| Win | 10–7 | Oct 2009 | Tiburon, USA | Challenger | Hard | (India) Harsh Mankad | (Serbia) Ilija Bozoljac (Serbia) Dušan Vemić | 6–4, 6–4 |
| Loss | 10–8 | Oct 2009 | Calabasas, USA | Challenger | Hard | (India) Harsh Mankad | (Mexico) Santiago González (Germany) Simon Stadler | 2–6, 7–5, [4–10] |
| Loss | 10–9 | Nov 2009 | Champaign-Urbana, USA | Challenger | Hard (i) | (India) Harsh Mankad | (United States) Brian Battistone (United States) Dann Battistone | 5–7, 6–7^{(5–7)} |
| Win | 11–9 | Aug 2010 | Vancouver, Canada | Challenger | Hard | (United Kingdom) Dominic Inglot | (United States) Ryan Harrison (United States) Jesse Levine | 6–4, 7–5 |
| Win | 12–9 | Aug 2010 | Binghamton, USA | Challenger | Hard | (United Kingdom) Dominic Inglot | (United States) Scott Lipsky (United States) David Martin | 5–7, 7–6^{(7–2)}, [10–8] |
| Win | 13–9 | Nov 2010 | Toyota, Japan | Challenger | Carpet (i) | (India) Purav Raja | (Japan) Tasuku Iwami (Japan) Hiroki Kondo | 6–1, 6–2 |
| Win | 14–9 | Feb 2011 | Meknes, Morocco | Challenger | Clay | (Italy) Simone Vagnozzi | (Italy) Alessio di Mauro (Italy) Alessandro Motti | 6–1, 6–2 |
| Win | 15–9 | Mar 2011 | Rimouski, Canada | Challenger | Hard (i) | (Canada) Vasek Pospisil | (United Kingdom) David Rice (United Kingdom) Sean Thornley | 6–0, 6–1 |
| Win | 16–9 | May 2011 | Cremona, Italy | Challenger | Clay | (India) Purav Raja | (Poland) Tomasz Bednarek (Poland) Mateusz Kowalczyk | 6–1, 6–2 |
| Loss | 16–10 | Jun 2011 | Nottingham, Great Britain | Challenger | Grass | (South Africa) Izak van der Merwe | (South Africa) Rik de Voest (Canada) Adil Shamasdin | 3–6, 6–7^{(9–11)} |
| Win | 17–10 | Jul 2011 | Winnetka, USA | Challenger | Hard | (United States) Bobby Reynolds | (Australia) Jordan Kerr (United States) Travis Parrott | 7–6^{(9–7)}, 6–4 |
| Win | 18–10 | Jul 2011 | Bogotá, Colombia | Challenger | Clay | (South Africa) Izak van der Merwe | (Colombia) Juan Sebastián Cabal (Colombia) Robert Farah | 7–6^{(7–3)}, 6–7^{(5–7)}, 0–0 def. |
| Win | 19–10 | Aug 2011 | Vancouver, Canada | Challenger | Hard | (United States) Travis Parrott | (Australia) Jordan Kerr (United States) David Martin | 6–2, 1–6, [16–14] |
| Loss | 19–11 | Aug 2011 | Binghamton, USA | Challenger | Hard | (Denmark) Frederik Nielsen | (Colombia) Juan Sebastián Cabal (Colombia) Robert Farah | 4–6, 3–6 |
| Win | 20–11 | Nov 2011 | Charlottesville, USA | Challenger | Hard (i) | (United Kingdom) Dominic Inglot | (United States) John Paul Fruttero (South Africa) Raven Klaasen | 4–6, 6–3, [10–7] |
| Loss | 20–12 | Jan 2012 | Heilbronn, Germany | Challenger | Hard (i) | (United Kingdom) Dominic Inglot | (Sweden) Johan Brunström (Denmark) Frederik Nielsen | 3–6, 6–3, [6–10] |
| Win | 21–12 | Jun 2012 | Nottingham, Great Britain | Challenger | Grass | (United Kingdom) Dominic Inglot | (United Kingdom) Jonathan Marray (Denmark) Frederik Nielsen | 6–4, 6–7^{(9–11)}, [10–8] |
| Win | 22–12 | Nov 2014 | Charlottesville, USA | Challenger | Hard (i) | (Denmark) Frederik Nielsen | (United Kingdom) Lewis Burton (United Kingdom) Marcus Willis | 3–6, 6–3, [10–2] |
| Win | 23–12 | Aug 2015 | Vancouver, Canada | Challenger | Hard | (Denmark) Frederik Nielsen | (India) Yuki Bhambri (New Zealand) Michael Venus | 7–6^{(7–4)}, 6–7^{(3–7)}, [10–5] |
| Loss | 23–13 | Jun 2017 | Surbiton, Great Britain | Challenger | Grass | (United States) Denis Kudla | (New Zealand) Marcus Daniell (Pakistan) Aisam Qureshi | 3–6, 6–7^{(0–7)} |
| Loss | 23–14 | Aug 2017 | Vancouver, Canada | Challenger | Hard | (Sweden) Robert Lindstedt | (United States) James Cerretani (United Kingdom) Neal Skupski | 6–7^{(6–8)}, 2–6 |
| Loss | 23–15 | Jan 2018 | Newport Beach, USA | Challenger | Hard | (United States) Denis Kudla | (United States) James Cerretani (India) Leander Paes | 4–6, 5–7 |
| Loss | 23–16 | Jun 2019 | Little Rock, USA | Challenger | Hard | (United States) Max Schnur | (Argentina) Matías Franco Descotte (Brazil) Orlando Luz | 5–7, 6–1, [10–12] |
| Loss | 23–17 | Aug 2019 | Vancouver, Canada | Challenger | Hard | (Canada) Adil Shamasdin | (Sweden) Robert Lindstedt (United Kingdom) Jonny O'Mara | 2–6, 5–7 |
| Loss | 23–18 | Sep 2019 | Cary, USA | Challenger | Hard | (Australia) John-Patrick Smith | (United States) Sekou Bangoura (United States) Michael Mmoh | 6–4, 4–6, [8–10] |
| Win | 24–18 | Feb 2020 | Cleveland, USA | Challenger | Hard | (United States) Nathaniel Lammons | (Australia) John-Patrick Smith (Australia) Luke Saville | 7-5, 6–2 |
| Win | 25–18 | Mar 2020 | Columbus, USA | Challenger | Hard | (United States) Nathaniel Lammons | (United Kingdom) Lloyd Glasspool (United States) Alex Lawson | 7–6^{(7–3)}, 7–6^{(7–4)} |
| Loss | 25-19 | Sep 2020 | Iași, Romania | Challenger | Clay | (United States) Nathaniel Lammons | (Brazil) Rafael Matos (Brazil) João Menezes | 2–6, 2–6 |
| Win | 26-19 | Oct 2020 | Split, Croatia | Challenger | Clay | (United States) Nathaniel Lammons | (Sweden) André Göransson (United States) Hunter Reese | 6–4, 7–6^{(7–3)} |
| Loss | 26-20 | Nov 2021 | Charlottesville, USA | Challenger | Hard (i) | (Denmark) Frederik Nielsen | (United States) William Blumberg (United States) Max Schnur | 6–3, 1–6, [12–14] |
| Loss | 26-21 | Nov 2021 | Champaign, USA | Challenger | Hard (i) | (United States) Max Schnur | (United States) Nathaniel Lammons (United States) Jackson Withrow | 4–6, 6–3, [6–10] |
| Win | 27-21 | Mar 2022 | Phoenix, USA | Challenger | Hard | (United States) Denis Kudla | (Germany) Oscar Otte (Germany) Jan-Lennard Struff | 7–6^{(12–10)}, 3–6, [10–6] |
| Win | 28-21 | Apr 2022 | Savannah, USA | Challenger | Clay | (Philippines) Ruben Gonzales | (Chinese Taipei) Wu Tung-lin (China) Zhang Zhizhen | 7–6^{(7–3)}, 6–4 |
| Loss | 28–22 | Aug 2022 | Vancouver, Canada | Challenger | Hard | (Australia) John-Patrick Smith | (Sweden) André Göransson (Japan) Ben McLachlan | 7–6^{(7–4)}, 6–7^{(7–9)}, [9–11] |
| Loss | 28–23 | Sep 2022 | Cary, USA | Challenger | Hard | (Australia) John-Patrick Smith | (United States) Nathaniel Lammons (United States) Jackson Withrow | 5–7, 6–2, [5–10] |
| Win | 29–23 | Oct 2022 | Hamburg, Germany | Challenger | Hard (i) | (United States) Max Schnur | (Jamaica) Dustin Brown (Germany) Julian Lenz | 7–6^{(8–6)}, 6–4 |

== Doubles performance timeline ==
Key
| W | F | SF | QF | #R | RR | Q# | P# | DNQ | A | Z# | PO | G | S | B | NMS | NTI | P | NH |

(W) winner; (F) finalist; (SF) semifinalist; (QF) quarterfinalist; (#R) rounds 4, 3, 2, 1; (RR) round-robin stage; (Q#) qualification round; (P#) preliminary round; (DNQ) did not qualify; (A) absent; (Z#) Davis/Fed Cup Zonal Group (with number indication) or (PO) play-off; (G) gold, (S) silver or (B) bronze Olympic/Paralympic medal; (NMS) not a Masters tournament; (NTI) not a Tier I tournament; (P) postponed; (NH) not held; (SR) strike rate (events won / competed); (W–L) win–loss record.
To avoid confusion and double counting, these charts are updated at the conclusion of a tournament or when the player's participation has ended.

Current through the 2022 Delray Beach Open.

| Tournament | 2008 | 2009 | 2010 | 2011 | 2012 | 2013 | 2014 | 2015 | 2016 | 2017 | 2018 | 2019 | 2020 | 2021 | 2022 | SR | W–L |
|---|---|---|---|---|---|---|---|---|---|---|---|---|---|---|---|---|---|
Grand Slam tournaments
| Australian Open | A | A | A | A | 2R | 1R | QF | 3R | QF | 2R | 1R | A | A | A | 2R | 0 / 8 | 11–8 |
| French Open | A | A | A | A | 3R | 3R | 2R | 1R | 3R | 2R | A | A | A | A | | 0 / 6 | 8–6 |
| Wimbledon | A | A | 1R | 1R | 1R | 3R | 1R | 2R | SF | 1R | A | A | NH | A | | 0 / 8 | 7–8 |
| US Open | A | A | A | 3R | 2R | QF | 1R | 3R | 1R | A | A | A | A | A | | 0 / 6 | 8–6 |
| Win–loss | 0–0 | 0–0 | 0–1 | 2–2 | 4–4 | 7–4 | 4–4 | 5–4 | 9–4 | 2–3 | 0–1 | 0–0 | 0–0 | 0–0 | 1–1 | 0 / 28 | 34–28 |
Year-end championship
| ATP Finals | Did not qualify | | | | | | | | RR | Did not qualify | | | | | | 0 / 0 | 0–3 |
ATP World Tour Masters 1000
| Indian Wells Masters | A | A | A | A | A | F | QF | A | 1R | 2R | A | A | NH | A | | 0 / 4 | 7–4 |
| Miami Open | A | A | A | A | A | 2R | 1R | A | SF | 1R | A | A | NH | A | | 0 / 4 | 4–4 |
| Monte-Carlo Masters | A | A | A | A | A | 1R | 1R | A | QF | 2R | A | A | NH | A | | 0 / 4 | 3–4 |
| Madrid Open | A | A | A | A | A | A | 2R | A | 2R | 2R | A | A | NH | A | | 0 / 3 | 3–3 |
| Italian Open | A | A | A | A | A | 1R | 2R | A | 2R | 1R | A | A | A | A | | 0 / 4 | 1–4 |
| Canadian Open | A | A | A | A | A | A | 1R | A | A | A | A | A | NH | A | | 0 / 1 | 0–1 |
| Cincinnati Masters | A | A | A | A | A | A | 1R | A | QF | A | A | A | A | A | | 0 / 2 | 2–2 |
| Shanghai Masters | NH | A | A | A | 2R | QF | A | A | 2R | A | A | A | NH | | | 0 / 3 | 3–3 |
| Paris Masters | A | A | A | A | A | 1R | A | A | 1R | A | A | A | A | A | | 0 / 2 | 0–2 |
| Win–loss | 0–0 | 0–0 | 0–0 | 0–0 | 1–1 | 7–6 | 3–7 | 0–0 | 9–8 | 3–5 | 0–0 | 0–0 | 0–0 | 0–0 | 0–0 | 0 / 27 | 23–27 |
Career statistics
| Titles / Finals | 0 / 0 | 0 / 0 | 0 / 0 | 0 / 1 | 1 / 4 | 1 / 4 | 1 / 2 | 3 / 4 | 1 / 1 | 1 / 2 | 0 / 0 | 0 / 0 | 0 / 0 | 0 / 0 | 0 / 0 | 8 / 18 | |
| Overall win–loss | 0–0 | 3–0 | 1–3 | 9–9 | 26–24 | 36–24 | 19–23 | 32–19 | 34–28 | 19–19 | 1–5 | 2–3 | 0–1 | 3–4 | 4–3 | 189–165 | |
| Year-end ranking | 520 | 144 | 118 | 57 | 35 | 21 | 50 | 33 | 22 | 65 | 316 | 167 | 121 | 138 | | 54% | |
