= Taylor Dent =

American tennis player

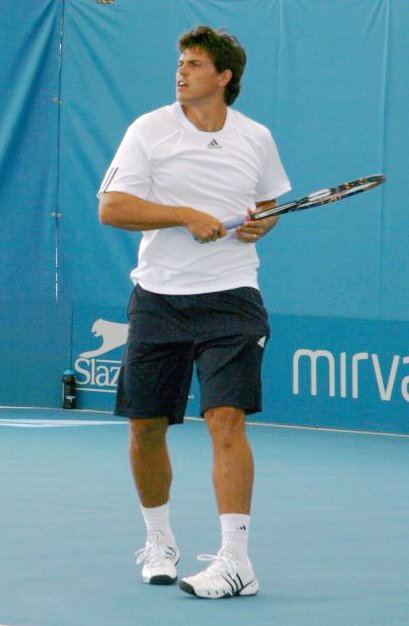
- Full name: Taylor Phillip Dent
- Country (sports): United States
- Residence: Grapevine, Texas, U.S.
- Born: April 24, 1981 (age 45) Newport Beach, California, U.S.
- Height: 1.88 m (6 ft 2 in)
- Turned pro: 1998
- Retired: 2010
- Plays: Right-handed (one-handed backhand)
- Prize money: $2,563,378

Singles
- Career record: 151–140 (ATP Tour and Grand Slam-level, and in Davis Cup)
- Career titles: 4
- Highest ranking: No. 21 (8 August 2005)

Grand Slam singles results
- Australian Open: 3R (2002, 2004, 2005)
- French Open: 2R (2005)
- Wimbledon: 4R (2005)
- US Open: 4R (2003)

Other tournaments
- Olympic Games: SF – 4th (2004)

Doubles
- Career record: 16–37 (ATP Tour and Grand Slam-level, and in Davis Cup)
- Career titles: 0
- Highest ranking: No. 170 (20 August 2001)

Grand Slam doubles results
- French Open: 1R (2003, 2004)
- US Open: 2R (2000)

Taylor Phillip Dent (born April 24, 1981) is an American retired professional tennis player from the United States. He reached a career-high singles ranking of World No. 21, winning 4 singles titles.

== Career ==
=== Early career and back injury ===
Dent won ATP titles in Newport (2002), Bangkok (2003), Memphis (2003), and Moscow (2003), and reached the finals of three other events on tour. His victory in Memphis is still often referred to as his most impressive victory, as he beat future world No. 1 Andy Roddick in the final.

Dent played with distinction at the 2004 Summer Olympics, where he made a push all the way to the semi-finals, where he was defeated by eventual gold medalist Nicolás Massú of Chile. He went on to lose the Bronze medal match 16–14 in the third set against Fernando González of Chile.

Dent, paired with Lisa Raymond, won the 2006 Hopman Cup, defeating the Netherlands two sets to one in the final.

In 2006 Dent did not play many competitive matches, due to a recurring back and groin problem. Dent had back surgery on March 19, 2007.

=== Return from injury ===
On May 26, 2008, Dent received a wild card and played at the Carson Challenger in the United States. It was his first match since February 2006. He lost his first round match to Cecil Mamiit. In July 2008, Dent took a wild card into his first ATP tour event for two seasons at the Hall of Fame tennis tournament in Newport, Rhode Island. He lost in three sets to Canada's Frank Dancevic.

On November 12, 2008, Dent won his first comeback match at the Champaign challenger against Frédéric Niemeyer, 6–3, 7–6^{(3)}. He followed this win up by defeating second seed and fellow American Robert Kendrick. In the third round, Dent had to withdraw against Sam Warburg. Using his protected ranking of 56, Dent played the 2009 Australian Open, where he was eliminated in the first round by Amer Delić.

As a qualifier, he reached the fourth round of the 2009 Miami Open, defeating Nicolás Almagro and Tommy Robredo in the process. He lost to Roger Federer in the fourth round, 3–6, 2–6. Despite the scoreline, the first set was a very entertaining encounter, with Federer's longest service game lasting just short of a quarter of an hour; Dent had eight break point opportunities. He had a poor run of form following this, but reversed the poor form by qualifying for Wimbledon, having entered the qualifying via a wildcard. He won his way through to the main draw, where he lost to Daniel Gimeno Traver in five sets in the first round.

He received a wild card for the 2009 US Open and won his first US Open match since 2005, upsetting Feliciano López in four sets. He advanced to the third round after beating Iván Navarro in the second round, in a five-set match. Following the match, he took the umpire microphone and thanked the crowd for support, following it with a victory lap around the stadium. In the third round, he was beaten by Andy Murray in straight sets. Following the US Open, Dent won the USTA Challenger of Oklahoma in Tulsa.

In his opening event of the 2010 season, he entered the main draw at the 2010 Australian Open. He defeated Fabio Fognini, in the first round and moved on to face tenth seed Jo-Wilfried Tsonga, to whom he lost.

On May 25, 2010, in Roland Garros, against Nicolás Lapentti, Dent served at 240 km/h and set a new tournament record that Fernando Verdasco and Andy Roddick had held before him (with 232 km/h). Additionally, at the 2010 Wimbledon Championships on June 23, 2010, Dent set a record with the fastest serve ever recorded at the Wimbledon tournament at 148 mph until he was surpassed by Frenchman Giovanni Mpetshi Perricard at the 2025 Wimbledon tournament.

On November 8, 2010, Taylor Dent announced his retirement from professional tennis.

=== Playing style ===
Unusual for a contemporary tennis player, Dent favored a pure serve-and-volley style of play. He possessed a powerful serve and strong volleys. He had the fourth fastest serve in the world, at a velocity of 243 km/h. At the 2010 Wimbledon Championships he set the record for the fastest serve ever recorded at the event with a speed of 238 km/h. (148 mph)

== Personal life ==
Dent is the son of former ATP player and 1974 Australian Open finalist Phil Dent. Taylor's mother, Betty Ann Grubb Stuart, who has remarried, reached the US Open doubles final in 1977 with Renée Richards. Grubb was a former top-10 singles player in the United States. Dent's half-brother, Brett Hansen-Dent, played on the ATP circuit for a short time after playing on the tennis team of the University of Southern California and reaching the singles final of the NCAA Men's Tennis Championship.

His godfather is the former top ten player John Alexander, of Australia, who was Phil Dent's doubles partner when that duo won the 1975 Australian Open doubles title.

Dent's first cousin, Misty May-Treanor, was one of the top pro volleyball players in the world, and she and her teammates won the gold medals at the 2004 Summer Olympics, 2008 Summer Olympics and the 2012 Summer Olympics.

Dent appeared in an American TV commercial for the insurance company Genworth Financial as the opponent of a boy playing the role of Jaden Agassi, the young son of Andre Agassi and Steffi Graf.

Dent attended Corona del Mar High School in Newport Beach, California, and he was on the interscholastic tennis team there. Dent also attended the Monte Vista High School, in Northern California.

On December 8, 2006, Dent married WTA Tour player Jennifer Hopkins. Their wedding party included notable tennis champions. Jenny gave birth to a son in 2010 and a daughter in 2014.

Taylor has been a commentator on The Tennis Channel for the US Open in 2006, 2007, and 2011.

Dent currently resides in Grapevine, Texas, with wife Jennifer Hopkins and their four children. In 2020, the two, along with Taylor's father, Phil Dent, opened The Birch Racquet and Lawn Club, located in Keller, Texas.

== Major finals ==
=== Olympic finals ===
==== Singles: 1 (0–1) ====
Result	Year	Championship	Surface	Opponent	Score
4th place	2004	Athens, Greece	Hard	(Chile) Fernando González	4–6, 6–2, 14–16

== ATP career finals ==
=== Singles: 7 (4 titles, 3 runner-ups) ===
Legend Grand Slam Tournaments (0–0) ATP World Tour Finals (0–0) ATP Masters 1000 Series (0–0) ATP 500 Series (1–1) ATP 250 Series (3–2)	Finals by surface Hard (2–3) Clay (0–1) Grass (1–0) Carpet (1–0)	Finals by setting Outdoors (1–3) Indoors (3–0)

Result	W–L	Date	Tournament	Tier	Surface	Opponent	Score
Win	1–0	Jul 2002	Newport, United States	International Series	Grass	(United States) James Blake	6–1, 4–6, 6–4
Win	2–0	Feb 2003	Memphis, United States	Championship Series	Hard	(United States) Andy Roddick	6–1, 6–4
Win	3–0	Sep 2003	Bangkok, Thailand	International Series	Hard	(Spain) Juan Carlos Ferrero	6–3, 7–6^{(7–5)}
Win	4–0	Sep 2003	Moscow, Russia	International Series	Carpet	(Armenia) Sargis Sargsian	7–6^{(7–5)}, 6–4
Loss	4–1	Oct 2004	Tokyo, Japan	Championship Series	Hard	(Czech Republic) Jiří Novák	7–5, 1–6, 3–6
Loss	4–2	Jan 2005	Adelaide, Australia	International Series	Hard	(Sweden) Joachim Johansson	5–7, 3–6
Loss	4–3	Jul 2005	Indianapolis, United States	International Series	Hard	(United States) Robby Ginepri	6–4, 3–6, 0–3, ret.

=== Doubles: 1 (1 runner-up) ===
Legend Grand Slam Tournaments (0–0) ATP World Tour Finals (0–0) ATP Masters 1000 Series (0–0) ATP 500 Series (0–0) ATP 250 Series (0–1)	Finals by surface Hard (0–1) Clay (0–0) Grass (0–0) Carpet (0–0)	Finals by setting Outdoors (0–1) Indoors (0–0)

Result	W–L	Date	Tournament	Tier	Surface	Partner	Opponents	Score
Loss	0–1	Sep 2004	Beijing, China	International Series	Hard	(United States) Alex Bogomolov Jr.	(United States) Justin Gimelstob (United States) Graydon Oliver	6–4, 4–6, 6–7^{(6–8)}

== ATP Challenger and ITF Futures finals ==
=== Singles: 7 (5–2) ===
Legend ATP Challenger (3–1) ITF Futures (2–1)	Finals by surface Hard (4–2) Clay (0–0) Grass (1–0) Carpet (0–0)

Result	W–L	Date	Tournament	Tier	Surface	Opponent	Score
Win	1–0	Jul 1999	USA F9, Redding	Futures	Hard	(United States) Wade McGuire	6–4, 6–1
Loss	1–1	Dec 1999	USA F21, Laguna Niguel	Futures	Hard	(Austria) Alexander Peya	4–6, 3–6
Win	2–1	Mar 2000	USA F6, San Antonio	Futures	Hard	(Brazil) Daniel Melo	6–2, 6–3
Win	3–1	Jun 2001	Surbiton, United Kingdom	Challenger	Grass	(South Africa) Neville Godwin	4–6, 7–6^{(7–3)}, 6–2
Win	4–1	Sep 2009	Tulsa, United States	Challenger	Hard	(United States) Wayne Odesnik	7–6^{(11–9)}, 7–6^{(7–4)}
Win	5–1	Nov 2009	Knoxville, United States	Challenger	Hard	(Serbia) Ilija Bozoljac	6–3, 7–6^{(8–6)}
Loss	5–2	Nov 2009	Champaign-Urbana, United States	Challenger	Hard	(United States) Michael Russell	5–7, 4–6

=== Doubles: 1 (1–0) ===
Legend ATP Challenger (1–0) ITF Futures (0–0)	Finals by surface Hard (1–0) Clay (0–0) Grass (0–0) Carpet (0–0)

Result	W–L	Date	Tournament	Tier	Surface	Partner	Opponents	Score
Win	1–0	Dec 2000	Champaign-Urbana, United States	Challenger	Hard	(United States) Mardy Fish	(Israel) Noam Behr (United States) Michael Russell	walkover

== Performance timeline ==
Key
W	F	SF	QF	#R	RR	Q#	P#	DNQ	A	Z#	PO	G	S	B	NMS	NTI	P	NH

(W) winner; (F) finalist; (SF) semifinalist; (QF) quarterfinalist; (#R) rounds 4, 3, 2, 1; (RR) round-robin stage; (Q#) qualification round; (P#) preliminary round; (DNQ) did not qualify; (A) absent; (Z#) Davis/Fed Cup Zonal Group (with number indication) or (PO) play-off; (G) gold, (S) silver or (B) bronze Olympic/Paralympic medal; (NMS) not a Masters tournament; (NTI) not a Tier I tournament; (P) postponed; (NH) not held; (SR) strike rate (events won / competed); (W–L) win–loss record.

=== Singles ===
Tournament	1997	1998	1999	2000	2001	2002	2003	2004	2005	2006	2007	2008	2009	2010	SR	W–L	Win%
Grand Slam tournaments
Australian Open	A	A	Q1	Q2	Q1	3R	A	3R	3R	1R	A	A	1R	2R	0 / 6	7–6	54%
French Open	A	A	A	A	A	Q1	1R	1R	A	A	A	A	A	2R	0 / 3	1–3	25%
Wimbledon	A	A	A	1R	2R	3R	1R	3R	4R	A	A	A	1R	2R	0 / 8	9–8	53%
US Open	Q1	2R	1R	1R	2R	1R	4R	2R	3R	A	A	A	3R	2R	0 / 10	11–10	52%
Win–loss	0–0	1–1	0–1	0–2	2–2	4–3	3–3	5–4	7–3	0–1	0–0	0–0	2–3	4–4	0 / 27	28–27	51%
Olympic Games
Summer Olympics	Not Held			A	Not Held			4th	Not Held			A	NH		0 / 1	4–2	67%
ATP Tour Masters 1000
Indian Wells	A	A	A	1R	1R	2R	A	4R	4R	A	A	A	2R	1R	0 / 7	7–7	50%
Miami	A	A	A	A	2R	Q1	2R	2R	QF	A	A	A	4R	2R	0 / 6	10–6	63%
Monte Carlo	A	A	A	A	A	A	1R	2R	A	A	A	A	A	A	0 / 2	1–2	33%
Madrid	Not Masters Series					Q2	Q2	QF	1R	A	A	A	A	A	0 / 2	3–2	60%
Canada	A	A	A	A	A	3R	A	A	2R	A	A	A	A	A	0 / 2	3–2	60%
Cincinnati	A	A	A	2R	1R	3R	A	1R	1R	A	A	A	A	2R	0 / 6	4–6	40%
Paris	A	A	A	A	A	Q2	Q2	1R	2R	A	A	A	A	A	0 / 2	1–2	33%
Hamburg	A	A	A	A	A	Q1	A	A	A	A	A	A	NMS		0 / 0	0–0	–
Win–loss	0–0	0–0	0–0	1–2	1–3	5–3	1–2	8–6	7–6	0–0	0–0	0–0	4–2	2–3	0 / 27	29–27	52%
Year-end ranking		410	227	181	124	57	33	32	29	574	–	865	76	118			

== See also ==
- List of male tennis players
