= Brian Battistone =

American tennis player (born 1979)

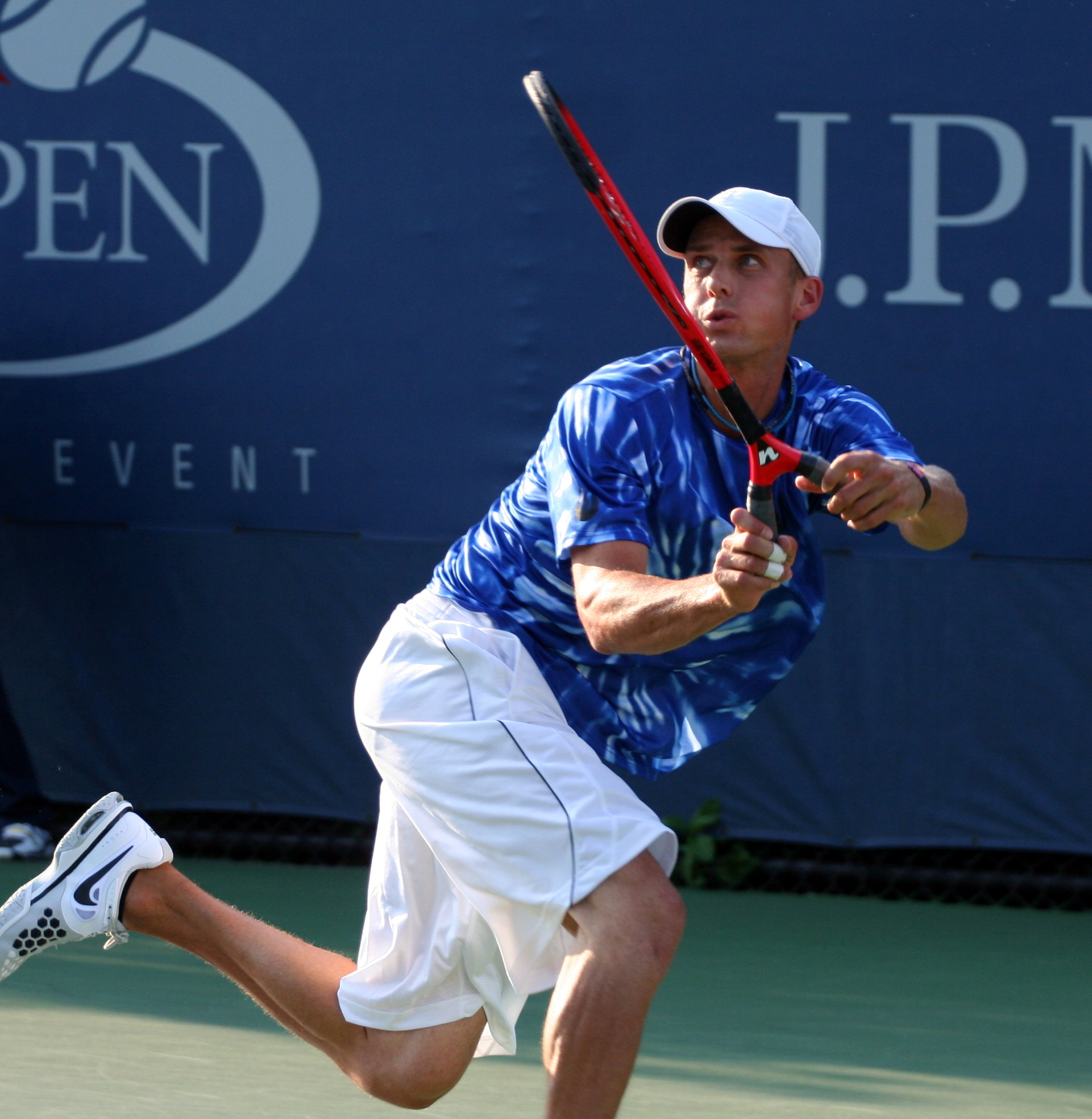
- Brian Battistone at 2012 US Open
- Country (sports): United States
- Residence: Las Vegas, Nevada, U.S.
- Born: August 10, 1979 (age 46) Santa Barbara, California, U.S.
- Height: 1.90 m (6 ft 3 in)
- Turned pro: 2007
- Plays: Right-handed (switches between two-handed backhand and left-handed forehand)
- Coach: Mark Battistone; Lionel Burt
- Prize money: US$677,358

Singles
- Career record: 0–0
- Career titles: 0
- Highest ranking: No. 853 (16 November 2009)

Doubles
- Career record: 2–9
- Career titles: 0
- Highest ranking: No. 88 (1 November 2010)
- Current ranking: No. 1,901 (6 April 2026)

Grand Slam doubles results
- US Open: 1R (2010)

Mixed doubles

Grand Slam mixed doubles results
- US Open: 1R (2012)
- Last updated on: 12 April 2026.

Brian Battistone (born August 10, 1979) is an American professional tennis player. He was born in Santa Barbara, California and currently resides in Las Vegas, Nevada. Throughout his career, Battistone reached a career high ranking of 853 in singles and 88 in doubles. Battistone is one of only three people (the others being his brother Dann Battistone and Tennyson Whiting) to use a two-handled tennis racket.

== Personal life ==
Battistone was born on August 10, 1979, in Santa Barbara, California, United States. His father, Mark, serves as Battistone's current head coach along with Lionel Burt. Besides his mother tongue English he also speaks Portuguese after his years as a missionary for the LDS church in Brazil. His brother, Dann Battistone, also plays tennis and has played doubles many times with Brian.

Sometime during his childhood, Battistone moved from Santa Barbara to Palm Desert.

== Career ==
It is unknown when exactly Battistone took up tennis. It is known that he and his brother played for a championship tennis team at Palm Desert High School in 1995. Battistone did not have a junior career as he decided to instead play higher level men's tournaments as a teenager. He played his first match in 1997 and took various breaks between 1997 and 2006 before officially turning pro in 2007 at the age of 27.

=== Singles ===
Battistone played his first singles match in 1997 and got his first ATP ranking of 1346 in 2001. He turned pro in 2007. His ranking started to improve. He achieved a singles high ranking of 853 on November 16, 2009. He received a wildcard into the qualifying draw of the Masters 1000 event at Indian Wells in 2010, which remains his only ATP qualifying draw appearance. He took the first set against 24th seed Jesse Witten, but lost the next two sets to lose the match. His success started to die down. He lost his singles rankings, and he began to play ITF qualifying matches by the time 2012 came.

=== Doubles ===
Battistone played his first doubles match in 1998, and he got his first ATP ranking of 1366 in 1999. His career took a big leap after turning pro in 2007. Battistone won 4 ATP Challenger titles and 2 ITF Futures titles, between 2007 and 2015. He won his first Futures tournament in 2007 with his brother. He won his first Challenger title in 2009, also with his brother. He made his ATP main draw debut at the 2008 Hall of Fame Tennis Championships, with his brother Dann. His doubles success earned him a wildcard spot into the 2010 US Open, with Ryler DeHeart. He won his first ATP Men's Doubles match, in October of 2010, with Andreas Siljeström as his partner, in the 2010 Stockholm Open. This victory helped to push him to his highest doubles ranking of 88 on November 1, 2010. He returned to the US Open in 2012 in the mixed doubles category with future Wimbledon mixed doubles champion Nicole Melichar as his partner. He won his first doubles title in five years, in 2015, at an ITF event, with Boris Nicola Bakalov. Battistone has been most notable for having the following partners: his brother Dann, Ryler Deheart, Andreas Silijeström, Nicholas Monroe, and Treat Huey.

== Playing style ==
Battistone is known for having an unorthodox style of play. He uses a volleyball-style jump serve. He jumps into the court, he switches the racket hand in mid-air, and he hits the ball before landing on the tennis court. He is a serve-and-volley player, which means that he volleys the ball as soon as it is returned to him after his serve. Battistone has a tendency to switch his backhand shot from a two-handed grip to a left-handed forehand grip.

=== Two-handled racket ===
Brian and his brother Dann are famous for using a two-handled racquet, that was designed by his coach Lionel Burt, of the Natural Tennis racquet factory. Brian and Dann have tried to advertise Burt's racket design. They have tried to make it more widespread, but the design did not attract much attention.

== Titles and finals ==
=== Doubles: 17 (6–11) ===
Legend (doubles) ATP Challenger Tour (4–7) ITF Futures Tour (2–4)	Titles by surface Hard (4–8) Clay (2–3)

Outcome	No.	Date (Final)	Tournament	Type	Surface	Partner	Opponents in the final	Score
Loss	0–1	Oct 2007	Laguna Niguel, California, United States	Futures	Hard	(United States) Dann Battistone	(United States) Justin Diao Natale (United States) Levar Harper-Griffith	1–6, 7–5, [7–10]
Win	1–1	Oct 2007	Baton Rouge, Louisiana, United States	Futures	Hard	(United States) Dann Battistone	(Australia) Carsten Ball (United States) Rylan Rizza	6–4, 7–6^{(7–3)}
Loss	1–2	Jan 2008	Boca Raton, Florida, United States	Futures	Hard	(United States) Dann Battistone	(Belarus) Uladzimir Ignatik (Russia) Andrey Kumantsov	5–7, 4–6
Loss	1–3	Mar 2008	Harlingen, Texas, United States	Futures	Hard	(United States) Dann Battistone	(United States) Nicholas Monroe (United States) Phillip Simmonds	3–6, 1–6
Loss	1–4	Jun 2008	Shingle Springs, California, United States	Futures	Hard	(United States) Dann Battistone	(United States) Rylan Rizza (United States) Kaes Van't Hof	7–5, 6–7^{(2–7)}, [9–11]
Loss	1–5	Aug 2008	Binghamton, New York, United States	Challenger	Hard	(United States) Dann Battistone	(Australia) Carsten Ball (United States) Travis Rettenmaier	3–6, 4–6
Win	2–5	Oct 2008	Sacramento, California, United States	Challenger	Hard	(United States) Dann Battistone	(United States) John Isner (United States) Rajeev Ram	1–6, 6–3, [10–4]
Win	3–5	Nov 2009	Champaign-Urbana, Illinois, United States	Challenger	Hard	(United States) Dann Battistone	(Philippines) Treat Huey (India) Harsh Mankad	7–5, 7–6^{(7–5)}
Loss	3–6	Apr 2010	Saint-Brieuc, France	Challenger	Clay	(United States) Ryler DeHeart	(Belarus) Uladzimir Ignatik (Spain) David Marrero Santana	6–4, 4–6, [5–10]
Win	4–6	May 2010	Sarasota, Florida, United States	Challenger	Clay	(United States) Ryler DeHeart	(Germany) Gero Kretschmer (Germany) Alex Satschko	5–7, 7–6^{(7–4)}, [10–8]
Win	5–6	May 2010	Carson, California, United States	Challenger	Hard	(United States) Nicholas Monroe	(Russia) Artem Sitak (Portugal) Leonardo Tavares	5–7, 6–3, [10–4]
Loss	5–7	Jul 2010	Pozoblanco, Spain	Challenger	Hard	(Sweden) Filip Prpic	(Spain) Marcel Granollers (Spain) Gerard Granollers-Pujol	4–6, 6–4, [4–10]
Loss	5–8	Aug 2010	Segovia, Spain	Challenger	Hard	(India) Harsh Mankad	(Brazil) Thiago Alves (Brazil) Franco Ferreiro	2–6, 7–5, [8–10]
Loss	5–9	Aug 2010	Istanbul, Turkey	Challenger	Hard	(Sweden) Andreas Siljeström	(Czech Republic) Leoš Friedl (Serbia) Dušan Vemić	6–7^{(6–8)}, 6–7^{(3–7)}
Loss	5–10	Aug 2010	San Sebastián, Spain	Challenger	Clay	(Sweden) Andreas Siljeström	(Spain) Rubén Ramírez Hidalgo (Spain) Santiago Ventura	4–6, 6–7^{(3–7)}
Loss	5–11	Sep 2010	Genova, Italy	Challenger	Clay	(Sweden) Andreas Siljeström	(Germany) Andre Begemann (Germany) Martin Emmrich	6–1, 6–7^{(3–7)}, [7–10]
Win	6–11	Nov 2015	Niceville, Florida, United States	Futures	Clay	(Bulgaria) Boris Nicola Bakalov	(United States) Nick Chappell (United States) Dane Webb	7–6^{(7–5)}, 5–7, [10–6]
