= 2011 JSM Challenger of Champaign–Urbana =

- Date: 14–20 November
- Edition: 10th
- Location: Champaign, United States

Champions

Singles
- (United States) Alex Kuznetsov

Doubles
- (South Africa) Rik de Voest / (South Africa) Izak van der Merwe
← 2010 ·	JSM Challenger of Champaign–Urbana	· 2012 →

The 2011 JSM Challenger of Champaign–Urbana was a professional tennis tournament played on hard courts. It was the tenth edition of the tournament which is part of the 2011 ATP Challenger Tour. It took place in Champaign, United States between 14 and 20 November 2011.

== ATP entrants ==
=== Seeds ===
Country	Player	Rank^{1}	Seed
USA	Michael Russell	98	1
RSA	Izak van der Merwe	115	2
CAN	Vasek Pospisil	120	3
RSA	Rik de Voest	130	4
DOM	Víctor Estrella	163	5
BLR	Uladzimir Ignatik	171	6
USA	Michael Yani	174	7
FRA	Vincent Millot	184	8

- ^{1} Rankings are as of November 7, 2011.

=== Other entrants ===
The following players received wildcards into the singles main draw:

- (United States) Brian Baker
- (United States) Roy Kalmanovich
- (United States) Dennis Nevolo
- (United States) Steve Johnson

The following players received entry as a special exempt into the singles main draw:

- (Bosnia and Herzegovina) Mirza Bašić
- (United States) Jesse Levine

The following players received entry from the qualifying draw:

- (United Kingdom) Alex Bogdanovic
- (United States) Kevin Kim
- (Canada) Peter Polansky
- (Australia) John-Patrick Smith

== Champions ==
=== Singles ===
(United States) Alex Kuznetsov def. (South Africa) Rik de Voest, 6–1, 6–3

=== Doubles ===
(South Africa) Rik de Voest / (South Africa) Izak van der Merwe def. (Germany) Martin Emmrich / (Sweden) Andreas Siljeström, 2–6, 6–3, [10–4]
