= 2010 JSM Challenger of Champaign–Urbana =

- Date: 15–21 November
- Edition: 9th
- Location: Champaign, United States

Champions

Singles
- (United States) Alex Bogomolov Jr.

Doubles
- (South Africa) Raven Klaasen / (South Africa) Izak van der Merwe
← 2009 ·	JSM Challenger of Champaign–Urbana	· 2011 →

The 2010 JSM Challenger of Champaign–Urbana was a professional tennis tournament played on hard courts. It was the ninth edition of the tournament which was part of the 2010 ATP Challenger Tour. It took place in Champaign, United States between 15 and 21 November 2010.

== ATP entrants ==
=== Seeds ===
Country	Player	Rank^{1}	Seed
JPN	Kei Nishikori	120	1
AUS	Peter Luczak	143	2
AUS	Carsten Ball	154	3
RSA	Izak van der Merwe	172	4
USA	Bobby Reynolds	180	5
USA	Alex Bogomolov Jr.	198	6
USA	Lester Cook	208	7
ECU	Giovanni Lapentti	218	8

- Rankings are as of November 8, 2010.

=== Other entrants ===
The following players received wildcards into the singles main draw:

- (Bosnia and Herzegovina) Amer Delić
- (United States) Steve Johnson
- (United States) Dennis Nevolo
- (United States) Abraham Souza

The following players received a Special Exempt into the singles main draw:

- (United States) Nicholas Monroe
- (South Africa) Fritz Wolmarans

The following players received entry from the qualifying draw:

- (South Africa) Andrew Anderson
- (United Kingdom) Chris Eaton
- (United States) John Paul Fruttero
- (Slovenia) Luka Gregorc

== Champions ==
=== Singles ===
(United States) Alex Bogomolov Jr. def. (Bosnia and Herzegovina) Amer Delić, 5–7, 7–6(7), 6–3

=== Doubles ===
(South Africa) Raven Klaasen / (South Africa) Izak van der Merwe def. (United States) Ryler DeHeart / (Canada) Pierre-Ludovic Duclos, 4–6, 7–6(2), [10–4]
