= Ryan Rowe =

American tennis player

- Country (sports): United States
- Born: April 3, 1986 (age 38)
- Height: 6 ft 5 in (196 cm)
- Plays: Left-handed
- Prize money: $14,156

Singles
- Highest ranking: No. 726 (October 8, 2012)

Doubles
- Highest ranking: No. 489 (July 22, 2013)

Ryan Rowe (born April 3, 1986) is an American former professional tennis player.

A left-handed player from Moline, Illinois, Rowe started playing tennis at the age of nine and spent part of his childhood in Florida under the tutelage of his uncle Chris Hunt. He ranked number one in the country in the 16s and under division.

Rowe played collegiate tennis for the University of Illinois and won the 2006 NCAA Division I doubles championship, partnering Kevin Anderson. In 2007, seeking to become the first pair to win back to back championships, Rowe and Anderson held a match point in the tournament decider, which they lost to Marco Born and Andreas Siljeström.

Following college, Rowe competed on the professional tour, winning one singles and five ITF Futures doubles titles.

== ITF Futures titles ==
=== Singles: (1) ===
No.	Date	Tournament	Surface	Opponent	Score
1.	Aug 2012	USA F22, Decatur	Hard	(India) Sanam Singh	6–4, 3–6, 6–4

=== Doubles: (5) ===
No.	Date	Tournament	Surface	Partner	Opponents	Score
1.	Oct 2008	USA F25, Laguna Niguel	Hard	(United States) Colt Gaston	(Philippines) Treat Huey (United States) Sheeva Parbhu	6–4, 6–74, [10–6]
2.	Jul 2012	USA F21, Godrey	Hard	(El Salvador) Marcelo Arévalo	(France) Sebastien Boltz (Switzerland) Luca Margaroli	6–4, 6–4
3.	Aug 2012	USA F23, Edwardsville	Hard	(United States) Daniel Nguyen	(South Korea) Chung Hyeon (South Korea) Nam Ji-sung	6–3, 7–5
4.	Oct 2012	USA F28, Mansfield	Hard	(United States) Vahid Mirzadeh	(United States) Alex Kuznetsov (Germany) Mischa Zverev	6–2, 6–75, [10–7]
5.	May 2013	USA F13, Tampa	Clay	(United States) Jean-Yves Aubone	(United States) Chase Buchanan (United States) Reid Carleton	6–3, 5–7, [12–10]
