= Champaign–Urbana Challenger =

Tennis tournament

Champaign Challenger
- 2026 Champaign Challenger

ATP Challenger Tour
- Event name: Paine Schwartz Partners Champaign Challenger
- Location: Champaign, Illinois, United States
- Venue: Atkins Tennis Center
- Category: ATP Challenger Tour
- Surface: Hard (Indoor)
- Draw: 32S/17Q/16D
- Prize money: $100,000 (2025), $82,000+H
- Website: Website

The Paine Schwartz Partners Champaign Challenger (formerly the JSM Challenger of Champaign–Urbana) is a professional tennis tournament played on indoor hardcourts. It is currently part of the ATP Challenger Tour. It is held annually at the Atkins Tennis Center in Champaign, Illinois, United States, since 1996.

== Past finals ==
=== Singles ===
Year	Champion	Runner-up	Score
2026	(United Kingdom) Oliver Tarvet	(Japan) Shunsuke Mitsui	6–1, 6–3
2025	(United States) Stefan Kozlov	(United States) Murphy Cassone	7–6^{(7–3)}, 7–5
2024	(United States) Ethan Quinn	(United States) Nishesh Basavareddy	6–3, 6–1
2023	(United States) Patrick Kypson	(United States) Alex Michelsen	6–4, 6–3
2022	(United States) Ben Shelton	(Australia) Aleksandar Vukic	0–6, 6–3, 6–2
2021	(United States) Stefan Kozlov	(Australia) Aleksandar Vukic	5–7, 6–3, 6–4
2020	Not Held		
2019	(United States) J. J. Wolf	(United States) Sebastian Korda	6–4, 6–7^{(3–7)}, 7–6^{(8–6)}
2018	(United States) Reilly Opelka	(United States) Ryan Shane	7–6^{(8–6)}, 6–3
2017	(United States) Tim Smyczek	(United States) Bjorn Fratangelo	6–2, 6–4
2016	(Switzerland) Henri Laaksonen	(Belgium) Ruben Bemelmans	7–5, 6–3
2015	(Switzerland) Henri Laaksonen	(United States) Taylor Fritz	4–6, 6–2, 6–2
2014	(France) Adrian Mannarino	(Denmark) Frederik Nielsen	6–2, 6–2
2013	(United States) Tennys Sandgren	(Australia) Samuel Groth	3–6, 6–3, 7–6^{(7–5)}
2012	(United States) Tim Smyczek	(United States) Jack Sock	2–6, 7–6^{(7–1)}, 7–5
2011	(United States) Alex Kuznetsov	(South Africa) Rik de Voest	6–1, 6–3
2010	(United States) Alex Bogomolov Jr.	(Bosnia and Herzegovina) Amer Delić	5–7, 7–6(7), 6–3
2009	(United States) Michael Russell	(United States) Taylor Dent	7–5, 6–4
2008	(South Africa) Kevin Anderson	(United States) Kevin Kim	6–3, 6–4
2007	(United States) Jesse Levine	(United States) Donald Young	7–6(4), 7–6(4)
2006	(United States) Amer Delić	(United States) Zack Fleishman	6–3, 6–0
2005	(Thailand) Danai Udomchoke	(United States) Justin Gimelstob	7–5, 6–2
2004	(United States) Justin Gimelstob	(Paraguay) Ramón Delgado	6–4, 6–4
2003	(United States) Paul Goldstein	(United States) Brian Vahaly	6–3, 6–1
2002	(United States) Robby Ginepri	(Philippines) Eric Taino	6–1, 3–6, 6–3
2001	(Croatia) Ivo Karlović	(United States) Robby Ginepri	6–4, 7–6
2000	(United States) Jeff Salzenstein	(France) Antony Dupuis	7–6, 6–4
1999	(Canada) Frédéric Niemeyer	(Canada) Sébastien Lareau	7–6, 3–6, 7–6
1998	(Canada) Daniel Nestor	(Venezuela) Maurice Ruah	3–6, 7–6, 6–3
1997	(United Kingdom) Andrew Richardson	(United States) Cecil Mamiit	6–7, 7–6, 6–3
1996	(United States) Justin Gimelstob	(United States) Steve Bryan	5–7, 6–3, 6–4

=== Doubles ===
Year	Champions	Runners-up	Score
2026	(United Kingdom) Tom Hands (United Kingdom) Matthew Summers	(United States) Hunter Heck (Japan) Kenta Miyoshi	7–6^{(7–4)}, 2–6, [10–5]
2025	(Australia) Patrick Harper (Japan) Shunsuke Mitsui	(United States) Ryan Seggerman (United States) Keegan Smith	7–5, 6–7^{(3–7)}, [12–10]
2024	(United States) Evan King (United States) Reese Stalder	(United Kingdom) James Davis (United Kingdom) James MacKinlay	7–6^{(7–3)}, 7–5
2023	(Australia) John-Patrick Smith (Netherlands) Sem Verbeek	(United States) Lucas Horve (United Kingdom) Oliver Okonkwo	6–2, 7–6^{(7–4)}
2022	(United States) Robert Galloway (Mexico) Hans Hach Verdugo	(United States) Ezekiel Clark (United States) Alfredo Perez	3–6, 6–3, [10–5]
2021	(United States) Nathaniel Lammons (United States) Jackson Withrow	(Philippines) Treat Huey (United States) Max Schnur	6–4, 3–6, [10–6]
2020	Not Held		
2019	(United States) Christopher Eubanks (United States) Kevin King	(United Kingdom) Evan Hoyt (United States) Martin Redlicki	7–5, 6–3
2018	(Australia) Matt Reid (Australia) John-Patrick Smith	(Mexico) Hans Hach Verdugo (Venezuela) Luis David Martínez	6–4, 4–6, [10–8]
2017	(India) Leander Paes (India) Purav Raja	(South Africa) Ruan Roelofse (United Kingdom) Joe Salisbury	6–3, 6–7^{(5–7)}, [10–5]
2016	(United States) Austin Krajicek (United States) Tennys Sandgren	(United Kingdom) Luke Bambridge (United Kingdom) Liam Broady	7–6^{(7–4)}, 7–6^{(7–2)}
2015	(Republic of Ireland) David O'Hare (United Kingdom) Joe Salisbury	(United States) Austin Krajicek (United States) Nicholas Monroe	6–1, 6–4
2014	(United States) Ross William Guignon (United States) Tim Kopinski	(Canada) Frank Dancevic (Canada) Adil Shamasdin	7–6^{(7–2)}, 6–2
2013	(United Kingdom) Edward Corrie (United Kingdom) Daniel Smethurst	(United States) Austin Krajicek (United States) Tennys Sandgren	7–6^{(7–5)}, 0–6, [10–7]
2012	(United States) Devin Britton (United States) Austin Krajicek	(South Africa) Jean Andersen (South Africa) Izak van der Merwe	6–3, 6–3
2011	(South Africa) Rik de Voest (South Africa) Izak van der Merwe	(Germany) Martin Emmrich (Sweden) Andreas Siljeström	2–6, 6–3, [10–4]
2010	(South Africa) Raven Klaasen (South Africa) Izak van der Merwe	(United States) Ryler DeHeart (Canada) Pierre-Ludovic Duclos	4–6, 7–6(2), [10–4]
2009	(United States) Brian Battistone (United States) Dann Battistone	(Philippines) Treat Conrad Huey (India) Harsh Mankad	7–5, 7–6(5)
2008	(United States) Rajeev Ram (United States) Bobby Reynolds	(France) Olivier Charroin (France) Nicolas Tourte	3–6, 6–3, [10–6]
2007	(Israel) Harel Levy (United States) Sam Warburg	(United States) Brendan Evans (United States) Scott Lipsky	6–4, 6–0
2006	(United States) Rajeev Ram (South Africa) Rik de Voest	(Brazil) André Sá (United States) Brian Wilson	5–7, 6–4, [10–7]
2005	(Australia) Ashley Fisher (United States) Tripp Phillips	(United States) Justin Gimelstob (United States) Rajeev Ram	6–3, 5–7, 6–0
2004	(United States) Brian Baker (United States) Rajeev Ram	(United States) Justin Gimelstob (United States) Graydon Oliver	7–6(5), 7–6(7)
2003	(United States) Travis Parrott (Brazil) Bruno Soares	(United States) Brian Baker (United States) Rajeev Ram	4–6, 6–4, 6–1
2002	(Romania) Gabriel Trifu (United States) Glenn Weiner	(Philippines) Eric Taino (Netherlands) Martin Verkerk	6–3, 6–2
2001	(United States) Mardy Fish (United States) Jeff Morrison	(South Africa) Paul Rosner (Romania) Gabriel Trifu	6–3, 5–7, 6–4
2000	(United States) Taylor Dent (United States) Mardy Fish	(Israel) Noam Behr (United States) Michael Russell	W/O
1999	(United States) Paul Goldstein (United States) Jim Thomas	(United States) Bob Bryan (United States) Mike Bryan	6–7, 7–6, 7–6
1998	(United States) Jared Palmer (United States) Jonathan Stark	(United States) Doug Flach (United States) Mark Merklein	6–4, 7–6
1997	(United States) Michael Sell (Zimbabwe) Kevin Ullyett	(Japan) Gouichi Motomura (Japan) Takao Suzuki	3–6, 7–6, 6–2
1996	(United States) David DiLucia (United States) Scott Humphries	(United States) Brandon Coupe (United States) Trey Phillips	6–4, 6–2
