= Dann Battistone =

American tennis player (born 1976)

- Country (sports): United States
- Residence: Las Vegas, Nevada, U.S.
- Born: 10 April 1976 (age 49); Santa Barbara, California, U.S.
- Height: 1.78 m (5 ft 10 in)
- Turned pro: 2007
- Retired: 2018
- Plays: Left-handed
- Prize money: $21,106

Singles
- Career record: 0–0
- Career titles: 0; 0 Challenger, 0 Futures

Doubles
- Career record: 0–3
- Career titles: 0; 2 Challenger, 1 Futures
- Highest ranking: No. 177 (6 April 2009)
- Last updated on: 8 May 2017.

Dann Battistone (born 10 April 1976) is an American tennis player.

Battistone has a career high ATP doubles ranking of 177 achieved on 6 April 2009. Battistone has won 2 ATP Challenger doubles titles.

Battistone made his ATP main draw debut at the 2008 Hall of Fame Tennis Championships in the doubles draw partnering his brother Brian Battistone.

Battistone and his brother made headlines when they played using a two-handled racket.

== Tour titles ==
Legend
Grand Slam (0)
ATP Masters Series (0)
ATP Tour (0)
Challengers (2)

=== Doubles ===
Result	Date	Category	Tournament	Surface	Partner	Opponents	Score
Winner	October 2008	Challenger	Sacramento, United States	Hard	(United States) Brian Battistone	(United States) John Isner (United States) Rajeev Ram	1–6, 6–3, [10–4]
Winner	November 2009	Challenger	Champaign, United States	Hard	(United States) Brian Battistone	(Philippines) Treat Huey (India) Harsh Mankad	7–5, 7–6^{(7–5)}
