= Amer Delić =

Bosnian-American tennis player

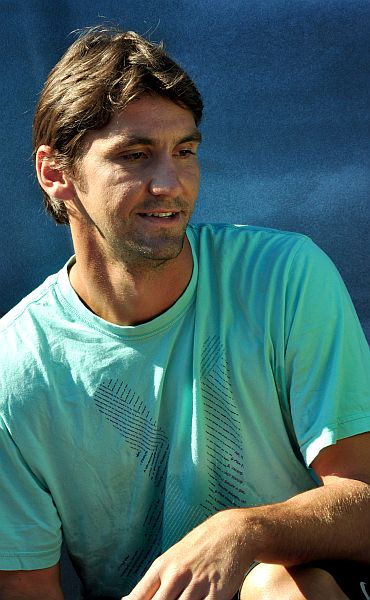
- Country (sports): United States (2003–2009); Bosnia and Herzegovina (2009–2012)
- Born: June 30, 1982 (age 44) Tuzla, SR Bosnia and Herzegovina, Yugoslavia
- Height: 1.96 m (6 ft 5 in)
- Turned pro: 2003
- Retired: 2012
- Plays: Right-handed (one-handed backhand)
- Prize money: $935,409

Singles
- Career record: 33-56
- Career titles: 0
- Highest ranking: No. 60 (9 July 2007)

Grand Slam singles results
- Australian Open: 3R (2009)
- French Open: 1R (2007)
- Wimbledon: 2R (2007)
- US Open: 2R (2004)

Doubles
- Career record: 22–34
- Career titles: 0
- Highest ranking: No. 74 (10 September 2007)

Grand Slam doubles results
- Australian Open: 2R (2007)
- French Open: 1R (2007)
- Wimbledon: 2R (2007)
- US Open: 3R (2005, 2007)

Grand Slam mixed doubles results
- US Open: 1R (2005, 2006, 2007)
- Last updated on: 12 November 2021.

Amer Delić (Bosnian pronunciation: [děliːtɕ]; born June 30, 1982) is a Bosnian American former professional tennis player. He is a former captain and member of the Bosnia and Herzegovina Davis Cup team.

Delić was born in Tuzla, then in Yugoslavia, now in the northeastern part of Bosnia and Herzegovina. In 1996, his family emigrated to Jacksonville, Florida, where he attended Samuel W. Wolfson High School, a public high school with the largest Bosnian population in Florida.

Representing the United States as a tour player until 2009, he then began representing his country of birth, Bosnia and Herzegovina, and was a member of its Davis Cup team.

== Career ==
Delić played High School Tennis at Wolfson High in Jacksonville, Florida. It was here that he won a State Championship.

Delić played collegiate tennis at the University of Illinois. At Illinois he won both the NCAA Division I singles and team championships in 2003.

In Grand Slams, Delić's best singles performance was to reach the third round at the 2009 Australian Open. In doubles Delić reached the third round of the US Open twice: with Jeff Morrison in 2005, having upset the team of Leander Paes and Nenad Zimonjić in the first round, and with Justin Gimelstob in 2007.

In March 2007, Delić reached the fourth round of the Miami Masters, upset World No. 4 Nikolay Davydenko en route in straight sets.

== 2009 ==
Delić started off the year in Brisbane, where he won three qualifying matches, but was defeated in the first round by Mario Ančić 6–7^{(2)}, 7–6^{(4)}, 6–7^{(6)}. In Sydney he was defeated in the first round by Denis Gremelmayr 4–6, 6–7^{(4)}. At the Australian Open, Amer finally started to win. He came through three qualifying matches, but lost in the qualifying stage. When he was awarded into a lucky loser spot after Filippo Volandri banned from a drug substantial use. In the first round of the main draw he defeated Taylor Dent 6–4, 3–6, 4–6, 6–3, 6–4. In the second round he defeated Paul-Henri Mathieu 1–6, 3–6, 6–3, 7–6^{(3)} 9–7. In the third round he was stopped by Novak Djokovic 2–6, 6–4, 3–6, 6–7^{(4)}. After the match spectators were caught throwing chairs at each other due to the conflict between Bosnians and Serbs. Due to a knee injury, Delić's last 2009 appearance on the ATP tour was a first round loss against Nicolas Mahut at the Hall of Fame Tennis Championships in July.

== 2010: Comeback and Davis Cup play for Bosnia and Herzegovina ==
At the US Open, Delić tried a comeback but lost in the first qualification round against Michael Yani. In September, he joined the Bosnia and Herzegovina Davis Cup team for a tie in the Europe/Africa Group II against Portugal. He lost both his singles match against Frederico Gil in five sets and his doubles match on the side of Aldin Šetkić to Gil and Leonardo Tavares in four sets. Overall, after a 2:3 loss, his team stayed in Group II.

== 2011 ==
In March, Delić participated in the Bosnia and Herzegovina team's Davis Cup tie in the Europe/Africa Zone Group II against Morocco. He won one of his two singles matches and the doubles match (on the side of Ismar Gorčić), thereby securing his team's victory. In the next tie against Estonia played in July, Delić won all his three matches decidedly helping his team to advance to the next stage against Denmark. There, he again won his two singles matches but not the doubles match so the team stayed in Group II. On the ATP Tour, Delić won his first title since 2008 at the BH Telecom Indoors at Sarajevo, a challenger tournament.

== 2012 ==
In Davis Cup play, Delić again was instrumental in securing his team's win over Turkey in February by winning both his singles matches and the doubles match.

== 2015 ==
Having been named Bosnia's Davis Cup captain in 2013, Amer made his comeback to professional tennis against Hungary in the 2015 Davis Cup after Bosnia was short a player, ultimately helping Bosnia win a doubles match. In addition to serving as their captain, Delić also served as Bosnia's reserve Davis Cup player in case of emergency.

== 2020 ==
In October 2020, Delić announced a return to semi-professional tennis, partnering golfer Sergio García in a doubles tournament to be held in Austin, Texas. The pair lost their opening match at the Men's UTR Pro Tennis Open DropShot event.

== 2022 & 2023 ==
Delic dabbles with pickleball.

== ATP Challenger and ITF Futures finals ==
=== Singles: 17 (8–9) ===
Legend ATP Challenger (6–8) ITF Futures (2–1)	Finals by surface Hard (7–9) Clay (1–0) Grass (0–0) Carpet (0–0)

Result	W–L	Date	Tournament	Tier	Surface	Opponent	Score
Loss	0–1	Aug 2002	USA F24, Kenosha	Futures	Hard	(Argentina) Ignacio Hirigoyen	2–6, 2–6
Win	1–1	Jul 2003	USA F19, Peoria	Futures	Clay	(Paraguay) Francisco Rodriguez	6–1, 4–6, 6–2
Loss	1–2	Feb 2004	Dallas, United States	Challenger	Hard	(France) Sebastien de Chaunac	4–6, 6–7^{(3–7)}
Win	2–2	Jun 2004	USA F15, Auburn	Futures	Hard	(United States) K.J. Hippensteel	7–6^{(7–3)}, 6–3
Loss	2–3	Nov 2004	Nashville, United States	Challenger	Hard	(United States) Justin Gimelstob	6–7^{(3–7)}, 6–7^{(4–7)}
Win	3–3	Apr 2005	Mexico City, Mexico	Challenger	Hard	(United States) Jeff Morrison	6–4, 3–6, 6–3
Loss	3–4	Oct 2005	Carson, United States	Challenger	Hard	(United States) Justin Gimelstob	6–7^{(5–7)}, 2–6
Loss	3–5	Jul 2006	Lexington, United States	Challenger	Hard	(South Korea) Lee Hyung-taik	7–5, 2–6, 3–6
Loss	3–6	Aug 2006	Vancouver, Canada	Challenger	Hard	(South Africa) Rik De Voest	6–7^{(4–7)}, 2–6
Loss	3–7	Sep 2006	New Orleans, United States	Challenger	Hard	(Philippines) Cecil Mamiit	3–6, 6–7^{(1–7)}
Loss	3–8	Oct 2006	Calabasas, United States	Challenger	Hard	(Australia) Mark Philippoussis	7–6^{(7–4)}, 6–7^{(4–7)}, 3–6
Win	4–8	Nov 2006	Louisville, United States	Challenger	Hard	(Switzerland) Stéphane Bohli	3–6, 6–2, 6–3
Win	5–8	Nov 2006	Champaign-Urbana, United States	Challenger	Hard	(United States) Zack Fleishman	6–3, 6–0
Win	6–8	Feb 2008	Dallas, United States	Challenger	Hard	(Switzerland) Stéphane Bohli	6–4, 7–5
Win	7–8	Jun 2008	Carson, United States	Challenger	Hard	(United States) Alex Bogomolov Jr.	7–6^{(7–5)}, 6–4
Loss	7–9	Nov 2010	Champaign-Urbana, United States	Challenger	Hard	(United States) Alex Bogomolov Jr.	7–5, 6–7^{(7–9)}, 3–6
Win	8–9	Mar 2011	Sarajevo, Bosnia & Herzegovina	Challenger	Hard	(Slovakia) Karol Beck	walkover

=== Doubles: 6 (3–3) ===
Legend ATP Challenger (3–2) ITF Futures (0–1)	Finals by surface Hard (3–3) Clay (0–0) Grass (0–0) Carpet (0–0)

Result	W–L	Date	Tournament	Tier	Surface	Partner	Opponents	Score
Loss	0–1	Nov 2003	USA F30, Hammond	Futures	Hard	(United States) Bobby Reynolds	(Chinese Taipei) Lu Yen-Hsun (Brazil) Bruno Soares	4–6, 4–6
Win	1–1	Aug 2004	Lexington, United States	Challenger	Hard	(United States) Matias Boeker	(United States) Jason Marshall (India) Harsh Mankad	7–5, 6–4
Win	2–1	Oct 2005	Calabasas, United States	Challenger	Hard	(United States) Bobby Reynolds	(Austria) Zbynek Mlynarik (United States) Glenn Weiner	7–5, 7–6^{(7–4)}
Loss	2–2	Oct 2006	Sacramento, United States	Challenger	Hard	(United States) Brian Wilson	(United States) Jeff Morrison (United States) Paul Goldstein	1–6, 3–6
Loss	2–3	Nov 2006	Louisville, United States	Challenger	Hard	(United States) Robert Kendrick	(Netherlands) Robin Haase (Netherlands) Igor Sijsling	walkover
Win	3–3	Jan 2012	Honolulu, United States	Challenger	Hard	(United States) Travis Rettenmaier	(United States) Jack Sock (United States) Nicholas Monroe	6–4, 7–6^{(7–3)}

== Performance timelines ==
Key
W	F	SF	QF	#R	RR	Q#	DNQ	A	NH

(W) winner; (F) finalist; (SF) semifinalist; (QF) quarterfinalist; (#R) rounds 4, 3, 2, 1; (RR) round-robin stage; (Q#) qualification round; (DNQ) did not qualify; (A) absent; (NH) not held; (SR) strike rate (events won / competed); (W–L) win–loss record.

=== Singles ===
Tournament	2003	2004	2005	2006	2007	2008	2009	2010	2011	2012	SR	W–L	Win%
Grand Slam tournaments
Australian Open	A	A	Q2	2R	2R	2R	3R	A	A	Q2	0 / 4	5–4	56%
French Open	A	A	Q1	Q2	1R	A	Q3	A	Q1	Q1	0 / 1	0–1	0%
Wimbledon	A	A	Q3	Q1	2R	Q1	Q1	A	Q2	A	0 / 1	1–1	50%
US Open	1R	2R	Q2	Q3	1R	1R	A	Q1	Q1	A	0 / 4	1–4	20%
Win–loss	0–1	1–1	0–0	1–1	2–4	1–2	2–1	0–0	0–0	0–0	0 / 10	7–10	41%
ATP Tour Masters 1000
Indian Wells	A	A	Q2	1R	Q1	Q1	A	A	A	1R	0 / 2	0–2	0%
Miami	A	Q1	Q1	A	4R	Q1	2R	A	A	Q1	0 / 2	4–2	67%
Rome	A	A	A	A	1R	A	A	A	A	A	0 / 1	0–1	0%
Canada	A	A	A	A	A	A	A	A	Q2	A	0 / 0	0–0	–
Cincinnati	A	A	A	A	1R	A	A	A	A	A	0 / 1	0–1	0%
Win–loss	0–0	0–0	0–0	0–1	3–3	0–0	1–1	0–0	0–0	0–1	0 / 6	4–6	40%

=== Doubles ===
Tournament	2004	2005	2006	2007	2008	SR	W–L	Win%
Grand Slam tournaments
Australian Open	A	A	A	2R	A	0 / 1	1–1	50%
French Open	A	A	A	1R	A	0 / 1	0–1	0%
Wimbledon	A	A	1R	2R	1R	0 / 3	1–3	25%
US Open	1R	3R	2R	3R	2R	0 / 5	6–5	55%
Win–loss	0–1	2–1	1–2	4–4	1–2	0 / 10	8–10	44%
ATP Tour Masters 1000
Miami	1R	A	A	A	A	0 / 1	0–1	0%
Cincinnati	A	A	A	2R	A	0 / 1	1-1	50%
Win–loss	0–1	0–0	0–0	1–1	0–0	0 / 2	1–2	33%
