= 2009 Price LeBlanc Lexus Pro Tennis Classic – Doubles =

Doubles
- 2009 Price LeBlanc Lexus Pro Tennis Classic

Final
- Champions: (United States) Rajeev Ram (United States) Bobby Reynolds
- Runners-up: (India) Harsh Mankad (United States) Scott Oudsema
- Score: 6–3, 6–7(6), [10–3]

Events
Singles	Doubles
← 2008 ·	Price LeBlanc Lexus Pro Tennis Classic	· 2010 →

Phillip Simmonds and Tim Smyczek were the defending champions but did not defend their title.

Rajeev Ram and Bobby Reynolds defeated Harsh Mankad and Scott Oudsema in the final (6–3, 6–7(6), [10–3]).

== Seeds ==
1. (United States) Rajeev Ram / (United States) Bobby Reynolds (champions)
2. (Thailand) Sanchai Ratiwatana / (Thailand) Sonchat Ratiwatana (first round)
3. (United States) Todd Widom / (United States) Michael Yani (quarterfinals)
4. (United States) Brendan Evans / (United States) Alex Kuznetsov (quarterfinals)

== Draw ==
=== Key ===
- Q = Qualifier
- WC = Wild card
- LL = Lucky loser
- Alt = Alternate
- SE = Special exempt
- PR = Protected ranking
- ITF = ITF entry
- JE = Junior exempt
- w/o = Walkover
- r = Retired
- d = Defaulted
- SR = Special ranking

=== Draw ===
First round
1	(United States) R Ram (United States) B Reynolds	6	6
(United States) B Battistone (Australia) S Groth	4	2
WC	(United States) Colt Gaston (United States) M Venus	6	3	[8]
(Germany) M Bachinger (Germany) B Becker	3	6	[10]
3	(United States) T Widom (United States) M Yani	6^{2}	7	[10]
WC	(United Kingdom) C Fleming (United Kingdom) K Skupski	7	6^{3}	[7]
(United Kingdom) A Bogdanovic (Republic of Ireland) C Niland	1	2
Q	(India) S Devvarman (Philippines) TC Huey	6	6
(Germany) B Dorsch (Australia) M Matosevic	7	4	[10]
(South Korea) KT Im (Thailand) D Udomchoke	6^{2}	6	[7]
(Australia) C Ball (Australia) N Lindahl	2	6	[8]
4	(United States) B Evans (United States) A Kuznetsov	6	4	[10]
(United States) R DeHeart (United States) N Monroe	2	4
WC	(United States) L Cook (United States) Shane La Porte	6	6
(India) H Mankad (United States) S Oudsema	6	6
2	(Thailand) Sa Ratiwatana (Thailand) So Ratiwatana	4	3

Quarterfinals
1	(United States) R Ram (United States) B Reynolds	6	6
(Germany) M Bachinger (Germany) B Becker	4	2
3	(United States) T Widom (United States) M Yani	3	4
Q	(India) S Devvarman (Philippines) TC Huey	6	6
(Germany) B Dorsch (Australia) M Matosevic	6	6
4	(United States) B Evans (United States) A Kuznetsov	2	4
WC	(United States) L Cook (United States) S La Porte	6	2	[8]
(India) H Mankad (United States) S Oudsema	2	6	[10]

Semifinals
1	(United States) R Ram (United States) B Reynolds	6	3	[10]
Q	(India) S Devvarman (Philippines) TC Huey	2	6	[6]
(Germany) B Dorsch (Australia) M Matosevic	3	6^{10}
(India) H Mankad (United States) S Oudsema	6	7

Finals
1	(United States) R Ram (United States) B Reynolds	6	6^{6}	[10]
(India) H Mankad (United States) S Oudsema	3	7	[3]
