= 2010 Baton Rouge Pro Tennis Classic – Doubles =

Doubles
- 2010 Baton Rouge Pro Tennis Classic

Final
- Champions: (Australia) Stephen Huss (Australia) Joseph Sirianni
- Runners-up: (Australia) Chris Guccione (Germany) Frank Moser
- Score: 1–6, 6–2, [13–11]

Events
Singles	Doubles
← 2009 ·	Baton Rouge Pro Tennis Classic	· 2011 →

Rajeev Ram and Bobby Reynolds were the defending champions, but Ram chose not to compete in doubles.
Reynolds chose to play with Robert Kendrick, but they lost against Treat Conrad Huey and Harsh Mankad in the first round.
Stephen Huss and Joseph Sirianni won in the final 1–6, 6–2, [13–11] against Chris Guccione and Frank Moser.

== Seeds ==
1. (United States) Scott Lipsky / (United States) David Martin (semifinals)
2. (Australia) Chris Guccione / (Germany) Frank Moser (finals)
3. (Philippines) Treat Conrad Huey / (India) Harsh Mankad (semifinals)
4. (Australia) Stephen Huss / (Australia) Joseph Sirianni (champion)

== Draw ==
=== Key ===
- Q = Qualifier
- WC = Wild card
- LL = Lucky loser
- Alt = Alternate
- SE = Special exempt
- PR = Protected ranking
- ITF = ITF entry
- JE = Junior exempt
- w/o = Walkover
- r = Retired
- d = Defaulted
- SR = Special ranking

=== Draw ===
First round
1	(United States) S Lipsky (United States) D Martin	6	6
WC	(United States) C Gaston (United States) M Venus	2	4
Q	(United States) C Parr (United States) T Paul	4	2
(Canada) P Polansky (United States) M Yani	6	6
4	(Australia) S Huss (Australia) J Sirianni	7	6
(Argentina) B Dabul (United States) D Young	6^{4}	1
(United States) B Evans (United States) T Smyczek	2	3
(United States) A Kuznetsov (United States) R Sweeting	6	6
(Australia) N Lindahl (Australia) M Matosevic	3	4
(Germany) M Emmrich (Sweden) A Siljeström	6	6
WC	(United States) R Kendrick (United States) B Reynolds	6^{4}	6	[7]
3	(Philippines) TC Huey (India) H Mankad	7	4	[10]
(United States) B Battistone (United States) R DeHeart	6	6
WC	(United States) B Joelson (United States) A Kumar	3	4
(Japan) T Ito (India) P Raja	6^{6}	1
2	(Australia) C Guccione (Germany) F Moser	7	6

Quarterfinals
1	(United States) S Lipsky (United States) D Martin	6	6
(Canada) P Polansky (United States) M Yani	3	1
4	(Australia) S Huss (Australia) J Sirianni	6	6^{10}	[11]
(United States) A Kuznetsov (United States) R Sweeting	4	7	[9]
(Germany) M Emmrich (Sweden) A Siljeström	5	4
3	(Philippines) TC Huey (India) H Mankad	7	6
(United States) B Battistone (United States) R DeHeart	6^{1}	3
2	(Australia) C Guccione (Germany) F Moser	7	6

Semifinals
1	(United States) S Lipsky (United States) D Martin	6^{6}	1
4	(Australia) S Huss (Australia) J Sirianni	7	6
3	(Philippines) TC Huey (India) H Mankad	6	2	[9]
2	(Australia) C Guccione (Germany) F Moser	4	6	[11]

Finals
4	(Australia) S Huss (Australia) J Sirianni	1	6	[13]
2	(Australia) C Guccione (Germany) F Moser	6	2	[11]
