= Kevin Anderson career statistics =

Career finals
Discipline	Type	Won	Lost	Total
Singles	Grand Slam	0	2	2
Singles	ATP Finals	–	–	–
Singles	ATP 1000	–	–	–
Singles	ATP 500	1	4	5
Singles	ATP 250	6	7	13
Singles	Olympics	–	–	–
Singles	Total	7	13	20
Doubles	Grand Slam	–	–	–
Doubles	ATP Finals	–	–	–
Doubles	ATP 1000	–	–	–
Doubles	ATP 500	1	2	3
Doubles	ATP 250	–	1	1
Doubles	Olympics	–	–	–
Doubles	Total	1	3	4

This is a list of main career statistics of South African professional tennis player Kevin Anderson. All statistics are according to the ATP World Tour and ITF websites.

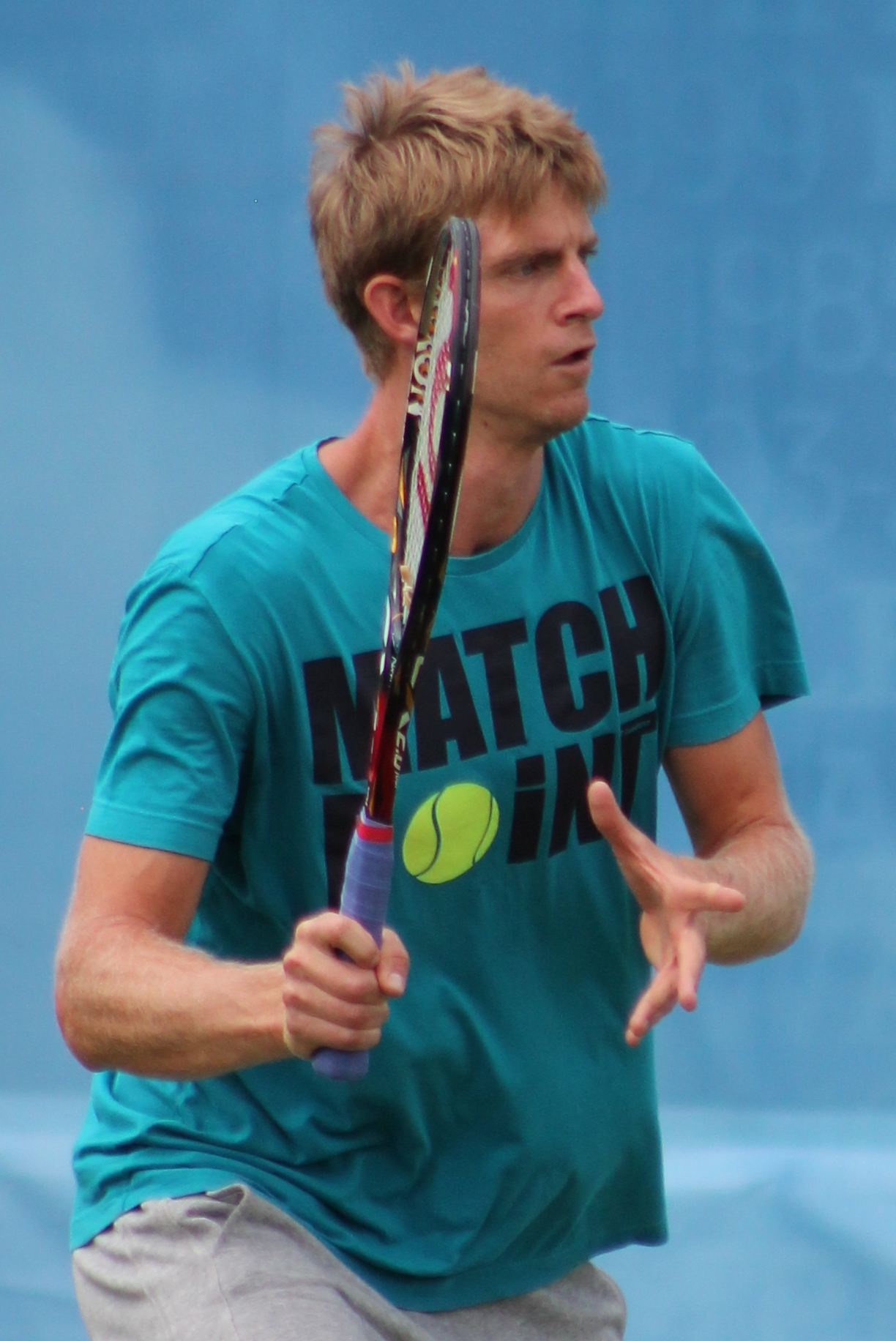
South African professional tennis player Kevin Anderson in 2015.

== Performance timelines ==
Key
W	F	SF	QF	#R	RR	Q#	P#	DNQ	A	Z#	PO	G	S	B	NMS	NTI	P	NH

(W) winner; (F) finalist; (SF) semifinalist; (QF) quarterfinalist; (#R) rounds 4, 3, 2, 1; (RR) round-robin stage; (Q#) qualification round; (P#) preliminary round; (DNQ) did not qualify; (A) absent; (Z#) Davis/Fed Cup Zonal Group (with number indication) or (PO) play-off; (G) gold, (S) silver or (B) bronze Olympic/Paralympic medal; (NMS) not a Masters tournament; (NTI) not a Tier I tournament; (P) postponed; (NH) not held; (SR) strike rate (events won / competed); (W–L) win–loss record.
To avoid confusion and double counting, these charts are updated at the conclusion of a tournament or when the player's participation has ended.

Only main-draw results in ATP Tour, Grand Slam tournaments, Davis Cup/ATP Cup/Laver Cup and Olympic Games are included in win–loss records.

=== Singles ===
Tournament	2007	2008	2009	2010	2011	2012	2013	2014	2015	2016	2017	2018	2019	2020	2021	2022	2023	SR	W–L	Win%
Grand Slam tournaments
Australian Open	A	1R	1R	1R	1R	3R	4R	4R	4R	1R	A	1R	2R	2R	1R	1R	A	0 / 14	13–14	48%
French Open	A	Q2	Q3	1R	2R	3R	4R	4R	3R	1R	4R	4R	A	3R	1R	A	A	0 / 11	19–11	63%
Wimbledon	A	1R	Q1	1R	2R	1R	3R	4R	4R	1R	4R	F	3R	NH	2R	A	A	0 / 12	21–12	63%
US Open	A	Q1	Q1	3R	3R	1R	2R	3R	QF	3R	F	4R	A	1R	2R	A	Q2	0 / 11	23–11	68%
Win–loss	0–0	0–2	0–1	2–4	4–4	4–4	9–4	11–4	12–4	2–4	12–3	12–4	3–2	3–3	2–4	0–1	0–0	0 / 48	76–48	61%
Year-end championships
ATP Finals	DNQ											SF	DNQ					0 / 1	2–2	50%
National representation
Summer Olympics	NH	2R	NH			A	NH			A	NH				A	NH		0 / 1	1–1	50%
Davis Cup	A	Z1	A	A	PO	A	A	A	A	A	A	A	A	A	A	A	A	0 / 0	8–1	89%
ATP Tour Masters 1000
Indian Wells Masters	A	A	1R	2R	1R	3R	QF	QF	3R	A	2R	QF	A	NH	3R	Q1	A	0 / 10	15–10	60%
Miami Open	A	3R	A	2R	QF	3R	3R	3R	4R	A	2R	QF	QF	NH	1R	1R	A	0 / 12	19–12	61%
Monte-Carlo Masters	A	A	A	A	1R	1R	2R	1R	A	A	A	A	A	NH	A	A	A	0 / 4	1–4	20%
Madrid Open	A	A	A	1R	2R	2R	3R	2R	1R	1R	A	SF	A	NH	A	A	A	0 / 8	8–8	50%
Italian Open	A	A	A	A	1R	1R	3R	2R	3R	2R	1R	2R	A	1R	A	A	A	0 / 9	6–9	40%
Canadian Open	A	A	A	3R	3R	1R	1R	QF	1R	QF	QF	SF	A	NH	A	A	A	0 / 9	16–9	64%
Cincinnati Masters	A	1R	A	A	2R	1R	1R	1R	3R	3R	1R	3R	A	2R	1R	A	A	0 / 11	6–11	35%
Shanghai Masters	NH		A	1R	1R	2R	2R	2R	QF	2R	2R	QF	A	NH			A	0 / 9	10–9	53%
Paris Masters	A	A	A	A	2R	3R	2R	QF	3R	A	2R	3R	A	2R	Q1	A	A	0 / 8	9–8	53%
Win–loss	0–0	2–2	0–1	4–5	9–9	5–9	12–9	12–9	11–8	7–5	6–7	16–8	3–1	2–3	2–3	0–1	0–0	0 / 81	91–81	53%
Career statistics
	2007	2008	2009	2010	2011	2012	2013	2014	2015	2016	2017	2018	2019	2020	2021	2022	2023	Career		
Tournaments	1	9	6	18	28	27	23	24	25	21	21	20	5	9	14	5	2	Career total: 258		
Titles	0	0	0	0	1	1	0	0	1	0	0	2	1	0	1	0	0	Career total: 7		
Finals	0	1	0	0	1	1	3	2	3	0	2	5	1	0	1	0	0	Career total: 20		
Overall win–loss	0–1	13–10	2–6	14–18	42–27	30–26	37–23	38–24	46–24	17–21	32–21	48–20	11–4	10–10	13–13	1–5	2–2	7 / 258	356–255	58%
Win %	0%	57%	25%	44%	61%	54%	62%	61%	66%	45%	60%	71%	73%	50%	50%	17%	50%	Career total: 58%		
Year-end ranking	221	104	161	61	32	37	20	16	12	67	14	6	91	81	79	–	627	$17,791,917		

=== Doubles ===
Tournament	2008	2009	2010	2011	2012	2013	2014–23	SR	W–L
Grand Slam tournaments
Australian Open	A	A	A	1R	A	2R	A	0 / 2	2–2
French Open	A	A	A	A	A	A	A	0 / 0	0–0
Wimbledon	QF	1R	A	3R	A	A	A	0 / 3	4–3
US Open	A	A	2R	A	A	A	A	0 / 1	1–0
Win–loss	2–1	0–1	1–0	2–2	0–0	2–1	0–0	0 / 6	7–5

== Grand Slam tournament finals ==
=== Singles: 2 (2 runner-ups) ===
Result	Year	Tournament	Surface	Opponent	Score
Loss	2017	US Open	Hard	(Spain) Rafael Nadal	3–6, 3–6, 4–6
Loss	2018	Wimbledon	Grass	(Serbia) Novak Djokovic	2–6, 2–6, 6–7^{(3–7)}

== ATP career finals ==
=== Singles: 20 (7 titles, 13 runner-ups) ===
Legend Grand Slam (0–2) ATP Finals (0–0) ATP Masters 1000 (0–0) ATP 500 Series (1–4) ATP 250 Series (6–7)	Titles by surface Hard (6–10) Clay (0–1) Grass (1–2)	Titles by setting Outdoor (5–12) Indoor (2–1)

Result	W–L	Date	Tournament	Tier	Surface	Opponent	Score
Loss	0–1	Mar 2008	Las Vegas Open, US	International	Hard	(United States) Sam Querrey	6–4, 3–6, 4–6
Win	1–1	Feb 2011	SA Tennis Open, South Africa	250 Series	Hard	(India) Somdev Devvarman	4–6, 6–3, 6–2
Win	2–1	Mar 2012	Delray Beach Open, US	250 Series	Hard	(Australia) Marinko Matosevic	6–4, 7–6^{(7–2)}
Loss	2–2	Jan 2013	Sydney International, Australia	250 Series	Hard	(Australia) Bernard Tomic	3–6, 7–6^{(7–2)}, 3–6
Loss	2–3	Apr 2013	Grand Prix Hassan II, Morocco	250 Series	Clay	(Spain) Tommy Robredo	6–7^{(6–8)}, 6–4, 3–6
Loss	2–4	Jul 2013	Atlanta Open, US	250 Series	Hard	(United States) John Isner	7–6^{(7–3)}, 6–7^{(2–7)}, 6–7^{(2–7)}
Loss	2–5	Feb 2014	Delray Beach Open, US	250 Series	Hard	(Croatia) Marin Čilić	6–7^{(6–8)}, 7–6^{(9–7)}, 4–6
Loss	2–6	Mar 2014	Mexican Open, Mexico	500 Series	Hard	(Bulgaria) Grigor Dimitrov	6–7^{(1–7)}, 6–3, 6–7^{(5–7)}
Loss	2–7	Feb 2015	Memphis Open, US	250 Series	Hard (i)	(Japan) Kei Nishikori	4–6, 4–6
Loss	2–8	Jun 2015	Queen's Club Championships, UK	500 Series	Grass	(United Kingdom) Andy Murray	3–6, 4–6
Win	3–8	Aug 2015	Winston-Salem Open, US	250 Series	Hard	(France) Pierre-Hugues Herbert	6–4, 7–5
Loss	3–9	Aug 2017	Washington Open, US	500 Series	Hard	(Germany) Alexander Zverev	4–6, 4–6
Loss	3–10	Sep 2017	US Open, US	Grand Slam	Hard	(Spain) Rafael Nadal	3–6, 3–6, 4–6
Loss	3–11	Jan 2018	Maharashtra Open, India	250 Series	Hard	(France) Gilles Simon	6–7^{(4–7)}, 2–6
Win	4–11	Feb 2018	New York Open, US	250 Series	Hard (i)	(United States) Sam Querrey	4–6, 6–3, 7–6^{(7–1)}
Loss	4–12	Mar 2018	Mexican Open, Mexico	500 Series	Hard	(Argentina) Juan Martín del Potro	4–6, 4–6
Loss	4–13	Jul 2018	Wimbledon, UK	Grand Slam	Grass	(Serbia) Novak Djokovic	2–6, 2–6, 6–7^{(3–7)}
Win	5–13	Oct 2018	Vienna Open, Austria	500 Series	Hard (i)	(Japan) Kei Nishikori	6–3, 7–6^{(7–3)}
Win	6–13	Jan 2019	Maharashtra Open, India	250 Series	Hard	(Croatia) Ivo Karlović	7–6^{(7–4)}, 6–7^{(2–7)}, 7–6^{(7–5)}
Win	7–13	Jul 2021	Hall of Fame Open, US	250 Series	Grass	(United States) Jenson Brooksby	7–6^{(10–8)}, 6–4

=== Doubles: 4 (1 title, 3 runner-ups) ===
Legend Grand Slam (0–0) ATP Finals (0–0) ATP Masters 1000 (0–0) ATP 500 Series (1–2) ATP 250 Series (0–1)	Titles by surface Hard (1–3) Clay (0–0) Grass (0–0)	Titles by setting Outdoor (1–1) Indoor (0–2)

Result	W–L	Date	Tournament	Tier	Surface	Partner	Opponents	Score
Loss	0–1	Feb 2012	Pacific Coast Championships, US	250 Series	Hard (i)	(Germany) Frank Moser	(The Bahamas) Mark Knowles (Belgium) Xavier Malisse	4–6, 6–1, [5–10]
Loss	0–2	Aug 2012	Washington Open, US	500 Series	Hard	(United States) Sam Querrey	(Philippines) Treat Huey (United Kingdom) Dominic Inglot	6–7^{(7–9)}, 7–6^{(11–9)}, [5–10]
Win	1–2	Mar 2014	Mexican Open, Mexico	500 Series	Hard	(Australia) Matthew Ebden	(Spain) Feliciano López (Belarus) Max Mirnyi	6–3, 6–3
Loss	1–3	Oct 2014	Valencia Open, Spain	500 Series	Hard (i)	(France) Jérémy Chardy	(Netherlands) Jean-Julien Rojer (Romania) Horia Tecău	4–6, 2–6

== ATP Challenger and ITF Futures finals ==
=== Singles: 16 (6–10) ===
Legend ATP Challenger (4–5) ITF Futures (2–5)	Finals by surface Hard (5–9) Clay (1–0) Grass (0–1) Carpet (0–0)

Result	W–L	Date	Tournament	Tier	Surface	Opponent	Score
Win	1–0	Nov 2004	Botswana F1, Gaborone	Futures	Hard	(South Africa) Wesley Whitehouse	6–7^{(1–7)}, 6–4, 7–6^{(15–13)}
Loss	1–1	Nov 2004	South Africa F1, Pretoria	Futures	Hard	(South Africa) Justin Bower	3–6, 6–7^{(3–7)}
Loss	1–2	Jun 2006	USA F13, Woodland	Futures	Hard	(United States) Michael Yani	6–3, 4–6, 3–6
Loss	1–3	Aug 2006	USA F21, Kenosha	Futures	Hard	(Australia) Adam Feeney	3–6, 7–6^{(7–2)}, 1–6
Loss	1–4	Jun 2007	USA F12, Loomis	Futures	Hard	(United States) Scoville Jenkins	5–7, 6–7^{(1–7)}
Win	2–4	Jun 2007	USA F13, Sacramento	Futures	Hard	(Peru) Iván Miranda	7–6^{(7–4)}, 6–3
Loss	2–5	Jul 2007	Winnetka, United States	Challenger	Hard	(Israel) Noam Okun	4–6, 3–6
Win	3–5	Sep 2007	New Orleans, United States	Challenger	Hard	(United States) Sam Warburg	6–4, 6–0
Loss	3–6	Feb 2008	USA F4, Brownsville	Futures	Hard	(United Kingdom) Jamie Baker	6–7^{(1–7)}, 4–6
Loss	3–7	Jun 2008	Surbiton, Great Britain	Challenger	Grass	(Canada) Frank Dancevic	6–4, 3–6, 6–7^{(4–7)}
Win	4–7	Nov 2008	Champaign-Urbana, United States	Challenger	Hard	(United States) Kevin Kim	6–3, 6–4
Win	5–7	May 2009	San Remo, Italy	Challenger	Clay	(Slovenia) Blaž Kavčič	2–6, 6–2, 7–5
Loss	5–8	Aug 2009	Granby, Canada	Challenger	Hard	(Belgium) Xavier Malisse	4–6, 4–6
Loss	5–9	Aug 2009	Binghamton, United States	Challenger	Hard	(Chile) Paul Capdeville	6–7^{(7–9)}, 6–7^{(11–13)}
Win	6–9	Apr 2010	Baton Rouge, United States	Challenger	Hard	(Germany) Tobias Kamke	6–7^{(7–9)}, 7–6^{(9–7)}, 6–1
Loss	6–10	Oct 2010	Seoul, South Korea	Challenger	Hard	(Chinese Taipei) Lu Yen-hsun	3–6, 4–6

=== Doubles: 10 (8–2) ===
Legend ATP Challenger (5–1) ITF Futures (3–1)	Finals by surface Hard (8–1) Clay (0–0) Grass (0–0) Carpet (0–1)

Result	W–L	Date	Tournament	Tier	Surface	Partner	Opponents	Score
Win	1–0	Nov 2004	Botswana F1, Gaborone	Futures	Hard	(South Africa) Stephen Mitchell	(South Africa) B Janse Van Rensburg (South Africa) Wesley Whitehouse	7–6^{(7–1)}, 7–6^{(7–5)}
Win	2–0	Jun 2006	USA F12, Rocklin	Futures	Hard	(United States) Scott Oudsema	(Chile) Jorge Aguilar (Mexico) Daniel Garza	6–3, 7–5
Win	3–0	Jun 2006	USA F13, Woodland	Futures	Hard	(United States) David Martin	(Chile) Jorge Aguilar (Mexico) Daniel Garza	7–6^{(7–5)}, 6–2
Loss	3–1	Jun 2007	USA F13, Sacramento	Futures	Hard	(United States) Ryler Deheart	(Australia) Sadik Kadir (Australia) Adam Kennedy	6–7^{(6–8)}, 6–2, 5–7
Win	4–1	Sep 2007	New Orleans, United States	Challenger	Hard	(United States) Ryler Deheart	(United States) Rajeev Ram (United States) Bobby Reynolds	6–2, 6–3
Win	5–1	Nov 2008	Knoxville, United States	Challenger	Hard	(New Zealand) G.D. Jones	(United States) Rajeev Ram (United States) Bobby Reynolds	3–6, 6–0, [10–7]
Win	6–1	Jul 2009	Lexington, United States	Challenger	Hard	(United States) Ryler Deheart	(Israel) Harel Levy (Israel) Amir Hadad	6–4, 4–6, [10–6]
Win	7–1	Aug 2009	Vancouver, Canada	Challenger	Hard	(South Africa) Rik de Voest	(Paraguay) Ramón Delgado (United States) Kaes Van't Hof	6–4, 6–4
Loss	7–2	Oct 2009	Rennes, France	Challenger	Carpet	(Slovakia) Dominik Hrbatý	(Croatia) Lovro Zovko (United States) Eric Butorac	4–6, 6–3, [6–10]
Win	8–2	Jan 2010	Honolulu, United States	Challenger	Hard	(United States) Ryler Deheart	(South Korea) Im Kyu-tae (Austria) Martin Slanar	3–6, 7–6^{(7–2)}, [15–13]

== Wins over top 10 players ==
- He has a 19–71 record against players who were, at the time the match was played, ranked in the top 10.

Season	2008	2009	2010	2011	2012	2013	2014	2015	2016	2017	2018	2019	2020	2021	2022	2023	Total
Wins	1	0	0	1	0	1	4	3	1	1	6	0	1	0	0	0	19

#	Player	Rk	Event	Surface	Rd	Score	Rk	Ref
2008
1.	(Serbia) Novak Djokovic	3	Miami Open, United States	Hard	2R	7–6^{(7–1)}, 3–6, 6–4	122	
2011
2.	(United Kingdom) Andy Murray	4	Canadian Open, Canada	Hard	3R	6–3, 6–1	35	
2013
3.	(Spain) David Ferrer	4	Indian Wells Open, US	Hard	2R	3–6, 6–4, 6–3	37	
2014
4.	(Spain) David Ferrer	4	Mexican Open, Mexico	Hard	QF	2–6, 4–2, ret.	21	
5.	(Switzerland) Stan Wawrinka	3	Indian Wells Open, US	Hard	4R	7–6^{(7–1)}, 4–6, 6–1	18	
6.	(Switzerland) Stan Wawrinka	4	Canadian Open, Canada	Hard	3R	7–6^{(10–8)}, 7–5	21	
7.	(Switzerland) Stan Wawrinka	4	Paris Masters, France	Hard	3R	6–7^{(2–7)}, 7–5, 7–6^{(7–3)}	18	
2015
8.	(Switzerland) Stan Wawrinka	4	Queen's Club Championships, UK	Grass	2R	7–6^{(7–4)}, 7–6^{(13–11)}	17	
9.	(United Kingdom) Andy Murray	3	US Open, United States	Hard	4R	7–6^{(7–5)}, 6–3, 6–7^{(2–7)}, 7–6^{(7–0)}	14	
10.	(Japan) Kei Nishikori	6	Shanghai Masters, China	Hard	3R	7–6^{(12–10)}, 7–6^{(7–3)}	10	
2016
11.	(Austria) Dominic Thiem	9	Canadian Open, Canada	Hard	2R	4–1, retired.	34	
2017
12.	(Austria) Dominic Thiem	7	Washington Open, US	Hard	3R	6–3, 6–7^{(6–8)}, 7–6^{(9–7)}	45	
2018
13.	(Switzerland) Roger Federer	2	Wimbledon, United Kingdom	Grass	QF	2–6, 6–7^{(5–7)}, 7–5, 6–4, 13–11	8	
14.	(United States) John Isner	10	Wimbledon, United Kingdom	Grass	SF	7–6^{(8–6)}, 6–7^{(5–7)}, 6–7^{(9–11)}, 6–4, 26–24	8	
15.	(Bulgaria) Grigor Dimitrov	5	Canadian Open, Canada	Hard	QF	6–2, 6–2	6	
16.	(Serbia) Novak Djokovic	3	Laver Cup, United States	Hard (i)	RR	7–6^{(7–5)}, 5–7, [10–6]	9	
17.	(Austria) Dominic Thiem	8	ATP Finals, United Kingdom	Hard (i)	RR	6–3, 7–6^{(12–10)}	6	
18.	(Japan) Kei Nishikori	9	ATP Finals, United Kingdom	Hard (i)	RR	6–0, 6–1	6	
2020
19.	(Russia) Daniil Medvedev	6	Vienna Open, Austria	Hard (i)	QF	6–4, 7–6^{(7–5)}	111	
