= 2010 Baton Rouge Pro Tennis Classic – Singles =

Singles
- 2010 Baton Rouge Pro Tennis Classic

Final
- Champion: (South Africa) Kevin Anderson
- Runner-up: (Germany) Tobias Kamke
- Score: 6–7(7), 7–6(7), 6–1

Events
Singles	Doubles
← 2009 ·	Baton Rouge Pro Tennis Classic	· 2011 →

Benjamin Becker was the defending champion but chose to compete in Monte Carlo instead.
Kevin Anderson won in the final 6–7(7), 7–6(7), 6–1 against Tobias Kamke.

== Seeds ==
1. (United States) Rajeev Ram (second round)
2. (South Africa) Kevin Anderson (champion)
3. (United States) Kevin Kim (first round)
4. (United States) Donald Young (second round)
5. (Argentina) Brian Dabul (first round)
6. (United States) Michael Yani (first round)
7. (United States) Ryan Sweeting (semifinals)
8. (United States) Robert Kendrick (quarterfinals)

== Draw ==
=== Key ===
- Q = Qualifier
- WC = Wild card
- LL = Lucky loser
- Alt = Alternate
- ITF = ITF entry
- PR = Protected ranking
- SR = Special ranking
- SE = Special exempt
- JE = Junior exempt
- JR = Junior Accelerator Programme entrant
- CO = College Accelerator Programme entrant
- NG = Next Gen Accelerator Program entrant
- w/o = Walkover
- r = Retired
- d = Defaulted

=== Finals ===
Semifinals
(Germany) Tobias Kamke	4	6	6
7	(United States) Ryan Sweeting	6	1	2
(Japan) Go Soeda	3	3
2	(South Africa) Kevin Anderson	6	6

Final
(Germany) Tobias Kamke	7	6^{7}	1
2	(South Africa) Kevin Anderson	6^{7}	7	6

=== Top half ===
First round
1	(United States) R Ram	3	7	6
(United States) R DeHeart	6	6^{6}	4
(United States) B Evans	6	1	1
PR	(Japan) K Nishikori	3	6	6
(United Kingdom) J Goodall	2	6	7
Q	(Canada) P Bester	6	4	5
(Germany) T Kamke	6	6
6	(United States) M Yani	3	4
3	(United States) K Kim	6^{4}	4
(Australia) N Lindahl	7	6
(Australia) J Sirianni	6	6
(Canada) P Polansky	3	3
Q	(Philippines) C Mamiit	4	7	6
WC	(United States) B Reynolds	6	5	4
WC	(United States) D Britton	3	2
7	(United States) R Sweeting	6	6

Second round
1	(United States) R Ram	3	7	3
PR	(Japan) K Nishikori	6	6^{3}	6
(United Kingdom) J Goodall	2	2
(Germany) T Kamke	6	6
(Australia) N Lindahl	7	6
(Australia) J Sirianni	6^{5}	1
Q	(Philippines) C Mamiit	2	2
7	(United States) R Sweeting	6	6

Quarterfinals
PR	(Japan) K Nishikori	4	1
(Germany) T Kamke	6	6
(Australia) N Lindahl	3	1
7	(United States) R Sweeting	6	6

Semifinals
(Germany) T Kamke	4	6	6
7	(United States) R Sweeting	6	1	2

=== Bottom half ===
First round
5	(Argentina) B Dabul	2	5
(United States) A Kuznetsov	6	7
(United Kingdom) J Baker	6	1	2
(United States) T Smyczek	4	6	6
(Japan) G Soeda	6	6
(Australia) C Guccione	2	2
(Japan) T Ito	3	4
4/WC	(United States) D Young	6	6
8	(United States) R Kendrick	6	6
Q	(South Africa) F Wolmarans	4	4
(United Kingdom) D Evans	4	3
WC	(United States) A Domijan	6	6
Q	(United States) B Koniecko	1	1
(United Kingdom) J Ward	6	6
(Australia) M Matosevic	6	5	6^{1}r
2	(South Africa) K Anderson	2	7	6^{5}

Second round
(United States) A Kuznetsov	6	1	6
(United States) T Smyczek	3	6	3
(Japan) G Soeda	7	6
4/WC	(United States) D Young	5	4
8	(United States) R Kendrick	6	6
WC	(United States) A Domijan	4	3
(United Kingdom) J Ward	7	2	1
2	(South Africa) K Anderson	5	6	6

Quarterfinals
(United States) A Kuznetsov	4	3
(Japan) G Soeda	6	6
8	(United States) R Kendrick	6^{1}	6	6^{4}
2	(South Africa) K Anderson	7	3	7

Semifinals
(Japan) G Soeda	3	3
2	(South Africa) K Anderson	6	6
