= 2009 Price LeBlanc Lexus Pro Tennis Classic – Singles =

Singles
- 2009 Price LeBlanc Lexus Pro Tennis Classic

Final
- Champion: (Germany) Benjamin Becker
- Runner-up: (United States) Rajeev Ram
- Score: 6–2, 3–6, 6–4

Events
Singles	Doubles
- Price LeBlanc Lexus Pro Tennis Classic

Bobby Reynolds was the defending champion. He was first-seeded player in the main draw, but he lost to José de Armas 4–6, 6–2, 2–6 in first round.
Benjamin Becker became the new champion, after he won 6–2, 3–6, 6–4, against Rajeev Ram in final.

== Seeds ==
1. (United States) Bobby Reynolds (first round)
2. (United States) Vince Spadea (first round)
3. (Canada) Frank Dancevic (first round)
4. (Germany) Benjamin Becker (champion)
5. (Germany) Benedikt Dorsch (quarterfinals)
6. (Thailand) Danai Udomchoke (second round)
7. (United States) Brendan Evans (first round)
8. (India) Somdev Devvarman (second round)

== Draw ==
Key

- Q = Qualifier
- WC = Wild card
- LL = Lucky loser
- Alt = Alternate
- ITF = ITF entry
- PR = Protected ranking
- SR = Special ranking
- SE = Special exempt
- JE = Junior exempt
- JR = Junior Accelerator Programme entrant
- CO = College Accelerator Programme entrant
- NG = Next Gen Accelerator Program entrant
- w/o = Walkover
- r = Retired
- d = Defaulted

=== Final four ===
Semifinals
WC	(United States) Rajeev Ram	6	6
(Australia) Samuel Groth	4	4
4	(Germany) Benjamin Becker	6	6
(Australia) Marinko Matosevic	4	2

Final
WC	(United States) Rajeev Ram	2	6	4
4	(Germany) Benjamin Becker	6	3	6

=== Top half ===
First round
1	(United States) B Reynolds	4	6	2
(Venezuela) J de Armas	6	2	6
WC	(United States) R Ram	6	6
(Australia) N Lindahl	3	4
WC	(United States) L Cook	6	6
Q	(Canada) F Niemeyer	1	1
(South Korea) KT Im	7	2	2
8	(India) S Devvarman	6^{4}	6	6
3	(Canada) F Dancevic	6	3	1
(Republic of Ireland) C Niland	3	6	6
Q	(Serbia) V Obradović	6	6
WC	(United States) Jarmere Jenkins	4	4
Q	(South Korea) D Yoo	3	2
(Australia) S Groth	6	6
(United States) T Widom	2	1
6	(Thailand) D Udomchoke	6	6

Second round
(Venezuela) J de Armas	0	4
WC	(United States) R Ram	6	6
WC	(United States) L Cook	7	7
8	(India) S Devvarman	6^{5}	5
(Republic of Ireland) C Niland	6	6
Q	(Serbia) V Obradović	3	2
(Australia) S Groth	7	6
6	(Thailand) D Udomchoke	6^{1}	3

Quarterfinals
WC	(United States) R Ram	6	6
WC	(United States) L Cook	3	1
(Republic of Ireland) C Niland	4	7	4
(Australia) S Groth	6	6^{5}	6

Semifinals
WC	(United States) R Ram	6	6
(Australia) S Groth	4	4

=== Bottom half ===
First round
5	(Germany) B Dorsch	6^{5}	6	7
WC	(United States) A Kuznetsov	7	1	5
(United Kingdom) A Slabinsky	4	5
Q	(Lithuania) R Berankis	6	7
(Australia) C Ball	4	6	6
(United States) R DeHeart	6	3	4
(United States) M Yani	6^{5}	4
4	(Germany) B Becker	7	6
7	(United States) B Evans	6	4	3
(Austria) M Fischer	1	6	6
(Australia) M Matosevic	6	6
(United Kingdom) A Bogdanovic	4	2
(United States) N Monroe	3	6	4
(Germany) M Bachinger	6	4	6
(Latvia) A Juška	7	4	6
2	(United States) V Spadea	6^{3}	6	2

Second round
5	(Germany) B Dorsch	6	6
Q	(Lithuania) R Berankis	4	4
(Australia) C Ball	4	6^{5}
4	(Germany) B Becker	6	7
(Austria) M Fischer	4	3
(Australia) M Matosevic	6	6
(Germany) M Bachinger	6	3	6
(Latvia) A Juška	1	6	3

Quarterfinals
5	(Germany) B Dorsch	3	0
4	(Germany) B Becker	6	6
(Australia) M Matosevic	6	6
(Germany) M Bachinger	1	1

Semifinals
4	(Germany) B Becker	6	6
(Australia) M Matosevic	4	2
