= 2008 Price LeBlanc Lexus Pro Tennis Classic – Singles =

Singles
- 2008 Price LeBlanc Lexus Pro Tennis Classic

Final
- Champion: (United States) Bobby Reynolds
- Runner-up: (Russia) Igor Kunitsyn
- Score: 6–3, 6–7^{(3–7)}, 7–5

Events
Singles	Doubles
- Price LeBlanc Lexus Pro Tennis Classic

The 2008 Price LeBlanc Lexus Pro Tennis Classic singles was a tennis competition event of the Association of Tennis Professionals (ATP), the secondary professional tennis circuit organized by the ATP. The 2008 ATP series calendar comprised 176 tournaments, with prize money ranging from $25,000 up to $150,000.

Izak van der Merwe was the defending champion (while the tournament was part of the ITF Men's Circuit), but lost in first round to Martin Fischer. Bobby Reynolds won the title by defeating Igor Kunitsyn 6–3, 6–7^{(3–7)}, 7–5 in the final.

== Seeds ==
1. (Germany) Benjamin Becker (second round)
2. (United States) Bobby Reynolds (champion)
3. (Russia) Igor Kunitsyn (final)
4. (United States) Robert Kendrick (first round)
5. (United States) Amer Delić (semifinals)
6. (United States) Sam Warburg (second round)
7. (Japan) ~~Go Soeda~~ (withdrew)
8. (United States) ~~Jesse Levine~~ (withdrew)
9. (Australia) Robert Smeets (second round)

== Draws ==
Key

- Q = Qualifier
- WC = Wild card
- LL = Lucky loser
- Alt = Alternate
- ITF = ITF entry
- PR = Protected ranking
- SR = Special ranking
- SE = Special exempt
- JE = Junior exempt
- JR = Junior Accelerator Programme entrant
- CO = College Accelerator Programme entrant
- NG = Next Gen Accelerator Program entrant
- w/o = Walkover
- r = Retired
- d = Defaulted

=== Finals ===
Semifinals
5	(United States) Amer Delić	6^{5}	6	3
3	(Russia) Igor Kunitsyn	7	4	6
LL	(Australia) José Statham	4	4
2	(United States) Bobby Reynolds	6	6

Final
3	(Russia) Igor Kunitsyn	3	7	5
2	(United States) Bobby Reynolds	6	6^{3}	7

=== Section 1 ===
First round
1	(Germany) B Becker	6	6
(France) G Lugassy	1	1
Q	(Austria) M Fischer	6	6
LL	(South Africa) I van der Merwe	0	2
LL	(Slovenia) L Gregorc	7	7
(United States) H Armando	5	6^{6}
Q	(United Kingdom) R Bloomfield	4	2
5	(United States) A Delić	6	6
3	(Russia) I Kunitsyn	6	6
(United States) R Ram	1	2
WC	(United States) R Sweeting	3	7	6^{4}
(Germany) B Dorsch	6	6^{1}	7
(United States) K Kim	6^{3}	7	4r
WC	(United States) S Jenkins	7	6^{4}	1
(United Kingdom) A Bogdanovic	6^{1}	4
9	(Australia) R Smeets	7	6

Second round
1	(Germany) B Becker	4	6^{3}
Q	(Austria) M Fischer	6	7
LL	(Slovenia) L Gregorc	1	2
5	(United States) A Delić	6	6
3	(Russia) I Kunitsyn	7	6
(Germany) B Dorsch	5	3
(United States) K Kim	6	6
9	(Australia) R Smeets	2	4

Quarter-Finals
Q	(Austria) M Fischer	4	4
5	(United States) A Delić	6	6
3	(Russia) I Kunitsyn	6	4	7
(United States) K Kim	2	6	6^{2}

Semi-finals
5	(United States) A Delić	6^{5}	6	3
3	(Russia) I Kunitsyn	7	4	6

=== Section 2 ===
First round
LL	(New Zealand) J Statham	6	6
(Romania) C Gârd	3	4
SE	(Switzerland) G Bastl	4	2
(United States) J Witten	6	6
(France) J Ouanna	1	6	6
Q	(United States) T Smyczek	6	3	4
(Latvia) A Juška	6	3r
4	(United States) R Kendrick	4	0
6	(United States) S Warburg	5	6	6
(United States) B Evans	7	4	4
WC	(United States) A Kuznetsov	6	6
WC	(United States) R Harrison	3	3
Q	(United States) M Yani	5r
(Brazil) T Alves	2
(Sweden) B Rehnquist	3	4
2	(United States) B Reynolds	6	6

Second round
LL	(New Zealand) J Statham	6	6
(United States) J Witten	3	4
(France) J Ouanna	6	6^{2}	6^{3}
(Latvia) A Juška	3	7	7
6	(United States) S Warburg	3	4
WC	(United States) A Kuznetsov	6	6
Q	(United States) M Yani	4	4
2	(United States) B Reynolds	6	6

Quarter-Finals
LL	(New Zealand) J Statham	6	7
(Latvia) A Juška	1	6^{1}
WC	(United States) A Kuznetsov	6^{10}	4
2	(United States) B Reynolds	7	6

Semi-finals
LL	(New Zealand) J Statham	4	4
2	(United States) B Reynolds	6	6
