= 2008 Price LeBlanc Lexus Pro Tennis Classic =

- Date: April 21–27
- Edition: 10th

Champions

Singles
- (United States) Bobby Reynolds

Doubles
- (United States) Phillip Simmonds / (United States) Tim Smyczek
| ← 2007 · | Price LeBlanc Lexus Pro Tennis Classic | · 2009 → |

The 2008 Price LeBlanc Lexus Pro Tennis Classic was a 2008 ATP Challenger Series event. It took place in Baton Rouge, Louisiana, from April 21 to April 27.

== Champions ==
=== Singles ===
(United States) Bobby Reynolds def. (Russia) Igor Kunitsyn 6–3, 6–7(3), 7–5

=== Doubles ===
(United States) Phillip Simmonds / (United States) Tim Smyczek def. (United States) Ryan Harrison / (United States) Michael Venus 2–6, 6–1, [10–4]
