= 2012 Savannah Challenger – Singles =

Singles
- 2012 Savannah Challenger

Final
- Champion: (United States) Brian Baker
- Runner-up: (France) Augustin Gensse
- Score: 6–4, 6–3

Events
Singles	Doubles
- Savannah Challenger

Wayne Odesnik is the defending champion, but lost in the second round this year.
Brian Baker won the title, defeating Augustin Gensse 6–4, 6–3 in the final.

== Seeds ==
1. (Russia) Dmitry Tursunov (first round)
2. (Canada) Vasek Pospisil (quarterfinals)
3. (United States) Michael Russell (first round, retired because of a hamstring injury)
4. (United States) Bobby Reynolds (first round)
5. (United States) Wayne Odesnik (second round)
6. (Australia) Marinko Matosevic (first round)
7. (United States) Ryan Sweeting (semifinals)
8. (United States) Jesse Levine (second round)

== Draw ==
Key

- Q = Qualifier
- WC = Wild card
- LL = Lucky loser
- Alt = Alternate
- ITF = ITF entry
- PR = Protected ranking
- SR = Special ranking
- SE = Special exempt
- JE = Junior exempt
- JR = Junior Accelerator Programme entrant
- CO = College Accelerator Programme entrant
- NG = Next Gen Accelerator Program entrant
- w/o = Walkover
- r = Retired
- d = Defaulted

=== Finals ===
Semifinals
Q	(United States) Blake Strode	1	1
Q	(United States) Brian Baker	6	6
7	(United States) Ryan Sweeting	2	1
(France) Augustin Gensse	6	6

Final
Q	(United States) Brian Baker	6	6
(France) Augustin Gensse	4	3

=== Top half ===
First round
1	(Russia) D Tursunov	4	3
(Canada) P Polansky	6	6
(Bosnia and Herzegovina) A Delić	6	7^{7}
Q	(Australia) J Lemke	3	6^{2}
(United States) T Smyczek	6	6
(United States) D Kudla	2	3
Q	(United States) B Strode	7^{10}	6
6	(Australia) M Matosevic	6^{8}	1
3	(United States) M Russell	2	6	2^{r}
Q	(United States) B Baker	6	3	4
WC	(United States) R Kendrick	4	7^{7}	6
(Canada) P-L Duclos	6	6^{3}	4
(United States) A Kuznetsov	3	5
(United States) R Ginepri	6	7
WC	(United States) B Fratangelo	6^{3}	2
5	(United States) W Odesnik	7^{7}	6

Second round
(Canada) P Polansky	3	6	6
(Bosnia and Herzegovina) A Delić	6	1	1
(United States) T Smyczek	2	3
Q	(United States) B Strode	6	6
Q	(United States) B Baker	6	6
WC	(United States) R Kendrick	3	1
(United States) R Ginepri	7^{7}	7
5	(United States) W Odesnik	6^{2}	5

Quarterfinals
(Canada) P Polansky	3	1
Q	(United States) B Strode	6	6
Q	(United States) B Baker	6	6
(United States) R Ginepri	4	4

Semifinals
Q	(United States) B Strode	1	1
Q	(United States) B Baker	6	6

=== Bottom half ===
First round
7	(United States) R Sweeting	7^{9}	4	7
(Moldova) R Borvanov	6^{7}	6	5
(South Africa) I van der Merwe	7^{9}	6
(Russia) T Gabashvili	6^{7}	4
Q	(United States) R Williams	6	6
(United Kingdom) A Bogdanovic	4	2
(United States) M Yani	7	6^{1}	6
4	(United States) B Reynolds	5	7^{7}	4
8	(United States) J Levine	6	6
(Czech Republic) J Hernych	4	1
(France) A Gensse	6^{5}	6	6
(Sweden) M Ryderstedt	7^{7}	2	2
WC	(United States) D Kosakowski	7	3	2
(Switzerland) M Lammer	5	6	6
(Australia) C Ball	7^{7}	5	4
2	(Canada) V Pospisil	6^{3}	7	6

Second round
7	(United States) R Sweeting	6	6
(South Africa) I van der Merwe	4	4
Q	(United States) R Williams	7^{7}	7
(United States) M Yani	6^{4}	5
8	(United States) J Levine	6	1	2
(France) A Gensse	0	6	6
(Switzerland) M Lammer	3	3
2	(Canada) V Pospisil	6	6

Quarterfinals
7	(United States) R Sweeting	6	6
Q	(United States) R Williams	1	4
(France) A Gensse	2	6	7
2	(Canada) V Pospisil	6	4	5

Semifinals
7	(United States) R Sweeting	2	1
(France) A Gensse	6	6
