= 2008 Price LeBlanc Lexus Pro Tennis Classic – Doubles =

Doubles
- 2008 Price LeBlanc Lexus Pro Tennis Classic

Final
- Champions: (United States) Phillip Simmonds; (United States) Tim Smyczek
- Runners-up: (United States) Ryan Harrison; (United States) Michael Venus
- Score: 2–6, 6–1, [10–4]

Events
Singles	Doubles
- Price LeBlanc Lexus Pro Tennis Classic

Brian Battistone and Dann Battistone were the defending champions (while the tournament was part of the ITF Men's Circuit), but lost in quarterfinals to Martin Fischer and Philipp Oswald.

Phillip Simmonds and Tim Smyczek won the title by defeating Ryan Harrison and Michael Venus 2–6, 6–1, [10–4] in the final.

== Seeds ==
1. (Germany) Benjamin Becker / (Russia) Igor Kunitsyn (quarterfinals, withdrew due to a shin splints injury on Becker)
2. (United States) Brendan Evans / (United States) Rajeev Ram (first round)
3. (United States) Amer Delić / (United States) Ryan Sweeting (first round)
4. (India) Mustafa Ghouse / (United States) Sam Warburg (quarterfinals)

== Draw ==
Key

- Q = Qualifier
- WC = Wild card
- LL = Lucky loser
- Alt = Alternate
- ITF = ITF entry
- PR = Protected ranking
- SR = Special ranking
- SE = Special exempt
- JE = Junior exempt
- JR = Junior Accelerator Programme entrant
- CO = College Accelerator Programme entrant
- NG = Next Gen Accelerator Program entrant
- w/o = Walkover
- r = Retired
- d = Defaulted

=== Draw ===
First round

Quarterfinals

Semifinals

Final

1
- (Germany) B Becker
- (Russia) I Kunitsyn

w/o

- (Brazil) T Alves
- (Sweden) B Rehnquist

1
- (Germany) B Becker
- (Russia) I Kunitsyn

- (Romania) C Gârd
- (Latvia) A Juška
6
2
[10]

- (Romania) C Gârd
- (Latvia) A Juška

w/o

- (United States) K Kim
- (Philippines) C Mamiit
3
6
[8]

- (Romania) C Gârd
- (Latvia) A Juška
2
4

4
- (India) M Ghouse
- (United States) S Warburg
4
6
[10]

WC
- (United States) P Simmonds
- (United States) T Smyczek
6
6

- (United Kingdom) A Bogdanovic
- (Serbia) V Obradović
6
3
[6]

4
- (India) M Ghouse
- (United States) S Warburg
5
2

WC
- (United States) P Simmonds
- (United States) T Smyczek
6
7

WC
- (United States) P Simmonds
- (United States) T Smyczek
7
6

- (France) G Lugassy
- (France) J Ouanna
3
5

WC
- (United States) P Simmonds
- (United States) T Smyczek
2
6
[10]

LL
- (United States) R Harrison
- (United States) M Venus
3
6
[10]

LL
- (United States) R Harrison
- (United States) M Venus
6
1
[4]

- (United States) R DeHeart
- (South Africa) I van der Merwe
6
4
[6]

LL
- (United States) R Harrison
- (United States) M Venus
7^{7}
6^{3}
[10]

WC
- (United States) C Gaston
- (United States) S Jenkins
6
7

WC
- (United States) C Gaston
- (United States) S Jenkins
6^{5}
7^{7}
[7]

3
- (United States) A Delić
- (United States) R Sweeting
4
5

LL
- (United States) R Harrison
- (United States) M Venus
3
6
[10]

- (United Kingdom) R Bloomfield
- (United Kingdom) K Skupski
7
2
[9]

Q
- (Austria) M Fischer
- (Austria) P Oswald
6
3
[7]

WC
- (United States) B Battistone
- (United States) D Battistone
5
6
[11]

WC
- (United States) B Battistone
- (United States) D Battistone
4
2

Q
- (Austria) M Fischer
- (Austria) P Oswald
2
6
[10]

Q
- (Austria) M Fischer
- (Austria) P Oswald
6
6

2
- (United States) B Evans
- (United States) R Ram
6
0
[6]
