= 2012 Savannah Challenger =

- Date: 23–29 April
- Edition: 4th
- Surface: Clay
- Location: Savannah, Georgia, United States

Champions

Singles
- (United States) Brian Baker

Doubles
- (Australia) Carsten Ball / (United States) Bobby Reynolds
- Savannah Challenger

The 2012 Savannah Challenger was a professional tennis tournament played on clay courts. It was the fourth edition of the tournament which was part of the 2012 ATP Challenger Tour. It took place in Savannah, United States between April 23 and April 29, 2012.

== Singles main draw entrants ==
=== Seeds ===
| Country | Player | Rank^{1} | Seed |
|---|---|---|---|
| RUS | Dmitry Tursunov | 87 | 1 |
| CAN | Vasek Pospisil | 97 | 2 |
| USA | Michael Russell | 112 | 3 |
| USA | Bobby Reynolds | 115 | 4 |
| USA | Wayne Odesnik | 118 | 5 |
| AUS | Marinko Matosevic | 121 | 6 |
| USA | Ryan Sweeting | 130 | 7 |
| USA | Jesse Levine | 131 | 8 |

- ^{1} Rankings are as of April 16, 2012.

=== Other entrants ===
The following players received wildcards into the singles main draw:

- (United States) Bjorn Fratangelo
- (United States) Robert Kendrick
- (United States) Daniel Kosakowski
- (Russia) Dmitry Tursunov

The following players received entry from the qualifying draw:

- (United States) Brian Baker
- (Australia) James Lemke
- (United States) Blake Strode
- (United States) Rhyne Williams

== Champions ==
=== Singles ===
- (United States) Brian Baker def. (France) Augustin Gensse, 6–4, 6–3

=== Doubles ===
- (Australia) Carsten Ball / (United States) Bobby Reynolds def. (United States) Travis Parrott / (Germany) Simon Stadler, 7–6^{(9–7)}, 6–4
