= 2009 Price LeBlanc Lexus Pro Tennis Classic =

- Date: April 6 – April 12
- Edition: 5th
- Location: Baton Rouge, Louisiana, United States

Champions

Singles
- (Germany) Benjamin Becker

Doubles
- (United States) Rajeev Ram / (United States) Bobby Reynolds
← 2008 ·	Price LeBlanc Lexus Pro Tennis Classic	· 2010 →

The 2009 Price LeBlanc Lexus Pro Tennis Classic was a professional tennis tournament played on outdoor hard courts. It was part of the 2009 ATP Challenger Tour. It took place in Baton Rouge, Louisiana, United States from April 6, 2009, to April 12, 2009.

== Singles entrants ==
=== Seeds ===
Nationality	Player	Ranking*	Seeding
USA	Bobby Reynolds	64	1
USA	Vince Spadea	111	2
CAN	Frank Dancevic	117	3
GER	Benjamin Becker	127	4
GER	Benedikt Dorsch	144	5
THA	Danai Udomchoke	147	6
USA	Brendan Evans	148	7
IND	Somdev Devvarman	150	8

- Rankings are as of March 23, 2009.

=== Other entrants ===
The following players received wildcards into the singles main draw:

- (United States) Lester Cook
- (United States) Jarmere Jenkins
- (United States) Alex Kuznetsov
- (United States) Rajeev Ram

The following players received entry from the qualifying draw:

- (Lithuania) Ričardas Berankis
- (Canada) Frédéric Niemeyer
- (Serbia) Vladimir Obradović
- (South Korea) Daniel Yoo

== Champions ==
=== Men's singles ===
(Germany) Benjamin Becker def. (United States) Rajeev Ram, 6–2, 3–6, 6–4

=== Men's doubles ===
(United States) Rajeev Ram / (United States) Bobby Reynolds def. (India) Harsh Mankad / (United States) Scott Oudsema, 6–3, 6–7(6), 10–3
