= 2010 Baton Rouge Pro Tennis Classic =

- Date: April 12 – April 18
- Edition: 6th
- Location: Baton Rouge, United States

Champions

Singles
- (South Africa) Kevin Anderson

Doubles
- (Australia) Stephen Huss / (Australia) Joseph Sirianni
← 2009 ·	Baton Rouge Pro Tennis Classic	· 2011 →

The 2010 Baton Rouge Pro Tennis Classic was a professional tennis tournament played on Hard courts. It was part of the 2010 ATP Challenger Tour. It took place in Baton Rouge, United States between 12 and 18 April 2010.

== ATP entrants ==
=== Seeds ===
Nationality	Player	Ranking*	Seeding
USA	Rajeev Ram	85	1
RSA	Kevin Anderson	108	2
USA	Kevin Kim	134	3
USA	Donald Young	141	4
ARG	Brian Dabul	146	5
USA	Michael Yani	149	6
USA	Ryan Sweeting	150	7
USA	Robert Kendrick	158	8

- Rankings are as of April 5, 2010.

=== Other entrants ===
The following players received wildcards into the singles main draw:

- (United States) Bobby Reynolds
- (United States) Devin Britton
- (United States) Donald Young
- (United States) Alexander Domijan

The following players received entry from the qualifying draw:

- (Canada) Philip Bester
- (United States) Bryan Koniecko
- (Philippines) Cecil Mamiit
- (South Africa) Fritz Wolmarans

== Champions ==
=== Singles ===
(South Africa) Kevin Anderson def. (Germany) Tobias Kamke, 6–7(7), 7–6(7), 6–1

=== Doubles ===
(Australia) Stephen Huss / (Australia) Joseph Sirianni def. (Australia) Chris Guccione / (Germany) Frank Moser, 1–6, 6–2, [13–11]
