= 2012 Savannah Challenger – Doubles =

Doubles
- 2012 Savannah Challenger

Final
- Champions: (Australia) Carsten Ball (United States) Bobby Reynolds
- Runners-up: (United States) Travis Parrott (Germany) Simon Stadler
- Score: 7–6^{(9–7)}, 6–4

Events
Singles	Doubles
- Savannah Challenger

Rik de Voest and Izak van der Merwe were the defending champions but de Voest decided not to participate.
van der Merwe played alongside Michael Yani, losing in the semifinals.
Carsten Ball and Bobby Reynolds won the title, defeating Travis Parrott and Simon Stadler 7–6^{(9–7)}, 6–4 in the final.

== Seeds ==
1. (Australia) Carsten Ball / (United States) Bobby Reynolds (champions)
2. (United States) Travis Parrott / (Germany) Simon Stadler (final)
3. (Australia) Chris Guccione / (Australia) John Peers (first round)
4. (United Kingdom) Chris Eaton / (United States) Nicholas Monroe (quarterfinals)

== Draw ==
Key

- Q = Qualifier
- WC = Wild card
- LL = Lucky loser
- Alt = Alternate
- ITF = ITF entry
- PR = Protected ranking
- SR = Special ranking
- SE = Special exempt
- JE = Junior exempt
- JR = Junior Accelerator Programme entrant
- CO = College Accelerator Programme entrant
- NG = Next Gen Accelerator Program entrant
- w/o = Walkover
- r = Retired
- d = Defaulted

=== Draw ===
First round
1	(Australia) C Ball (United States) B Reynolds	6	5	[10]
(Russia) T Gabashvili (Russia) D Tursunov	4	7	[7]
(France) A Gensse (United States) K Kim	3	6	[10]
(Canada) P Bester (Canada) P Polansky	6	4	[7]
3	(Australia) C Guccione (Australia) J Peers	3	6	[9]
WC	(Estonia) Mikk Irdoja (Spain) Georgi Rumenov Payakov	6	4	[11]
LL	(Philippines) Ruben Gonzales (United States) Chris Kwon	6	1	[6]
(South Africa) I van der Merwe (United States) M Yani	3	6	[10]
(United States) Vahid Mirzadeh (United States) P Simmonds	2	6^{3}
(United States) J Levine (Canada) V Pospisil	6	7^{7}
WC	(United States) Sekou Bangoura (United States) D Kosakowski	6^{9}	2
4	(United Kingdom) C Eaton (United States) N Monroe	7^{11}	6
(United States) B Baker (Bosnia and Herzegovina) A Delić	3	0
(Canada) P-L Duclos (United States) A Kuznetsov	6	6
Q	(Brazil) Clayton Almeida (United States) Joshua Zavala	4	2
2	(United States) T Parrott (Germany) S Stadler	6	6

Quarterfinals
1	(Australia) C Ball (United States) B Reynolds	6	6
(France) A Gensse (United States) K Kim	2	3
WC	(Estonia) Mikk Irdoja (Spain) Georgi Rumenov Payakov	1	5
(South Africa) I van der Merwe (United States) M Yani	6	7
(United States) J Levine (Canada) V Pospisil	7^{7}	6
4	(United Kingdom) C Eaton (United States) N Monroe	6^{5}	2
(Canada) P-L Duclos (United States) A Kuznetsov	4	1
2	(United States) T Parrott (Germany) S Stadler	6	6

Semifinals
1	(Australia) C Ball (United States) B Reynolds	6^{0}	6	[10]
(South Africa) I van der Merwe (United States) M Yani	7^{7}	1	[5]
(United States) J Levine (Canada) V Pospisil	7^{7}	2	[7]
2	(United States) T Parrott (Germany) S Stadler	6^{3}	6	[10]

Final
1	(Australia) C Ball (United States) B Reynolds	7^{9}	6
2	(United States) T Parrott (Germany) S Stadler	6^{7}	4
