= Music City Challenger =

Defunct tennis tournament
- Location: Nashville, Tennessee
- Venue: Vanderbilt University
- Category: ATP Challenger Series
- Surface: Hard / Indoors
- Draw: 32S/16Q/16D
- Prize money: $75,000
- Website: Official Website

The Music City Challenger was a tennis tournament held in Nashville, Tennessee, USA, from 2004 until 2008. The event was part of the ATP Challenger Series and was played on indoor hardcourts.

== Past finals ==
=== Singles ===
Year	Champion	Runner-up	Score
2004	(United States) Justin Gimelstob	(United States) Amer Delic	7–6, 7–6
2005	(United States) Bobby Reynolds	(Paraguay) Ramón Delgado	6–4, 6–4
2006	(Netherlands) Robin Haase	(Denmark) Kristian Pless	7–6, 6–3
2007	(United States) Jesse Levine	(United States) Alex Kuznetsov	3–6, 6–2, 7–6
2008	(United States) Robert Kendrick	(India) Somdev Devvarman	6–3, 7–5

=== Doubles ===
Year	Champion	Runner-up	Score
2004	(United States) Jason Marshall (United States) Travis Parrott	(United States) Cecil Mamiit (Thailand) Danai Udomchoke	6–3, 6–4
2005	(Serbia and Montenegro) Ilija Bozoljac (United States) Brian Wilson	(Mexico) Santiago González (Argentina) Diego Hartfield	7–6, 6–4
2006	(United States) Scott Lipsky (United States) David Martin	(South Africa) Rik de Voest (United States) Eric Nunez	6–7, 6–4, [10-6]
2007	(United States) Rajeev Ram (United States) Bobby Reynolds	(Australia) Ashley Fisher (Australia) Stephen Huss	6–7, 6–3, [12-10]
2008	(Australia) Carsten Ball (United States) Travis Rettenmaier	(India) Harsh Mankad (India) Ashutosh Singh	6–4, 7–5
