= Lubbock Challenger =

Defunct tennis tournament
- Location: Lubbock, Texas
- Venue: McLeod Tennis Center
- Category: ATP Challenger Series
- Surface: Hard / outdoors
- Draw: 32S/32Q/16D
- Prize money: $50,000
- Website: Lubbock Challenger

The Lubbock Challenger was a tennis tournament held in Lubbock, Texas, USA, from 2005 until 2008. The event was part of the ATP Challenger series and was played on outdoor hardcourts.

== Past finals ==
=== Singles ===
Year	Champion	Runner-up	Score
2005	(Paraguay) Ramón Delgado	(United States) Bobby Reynolds	2-6, 7-6, 6-3
2006	(United States) Sam Querrey	(Israel) Noam Okun	6-1, 6-4
2007	(Australia) Robert Smeets	(Serbia) Dušan Vemić	6-3, 7-6
2008	(United States) John Isner	(Canada) Frank Dancevic	7-6, 4-6, 6-2

=== Doubles ===
Year	Champion	Runner-up	Score
2005	(United States) Hugo Armando (United States) Glenn Weiner	(United States) Jan-Michael Gambill (United States) Scott Oudsema	5-7, 6-2, 7-6
2006	(United States) Chris Drake (United States) Scott Lipsky	(United States) Goran Dragicevic (United States) Mirko Pehar	7-6, 6-3
2007	(United States) Alex Kuznetsov (United States) Ryan Sweeting	(South Africa) Rik de Voest (United States) Bobby Reynolds	6-3, 6-2
2008	(Moldova) Roman Borvanov (Russia) Artem Sitak	(United States) Alex Bogomolov (Serbia) Dušan Vemić	6-2, 6-3
