= Scott Oudsema =

American tennis player (born 1986)

- Country (sports): (United States)
- Residence: Kalamazoo, United States
- Born: July 1, 1986 (age 39) Kalamazoo, Michigan, United States
- Height: 6 ft 3 in (191 cm)
- Plays: Right-handed
- Prize money: $164,610

Singles
- Career record: 1–4
- Career titles: 0
- Highest ranking: No. 255 (7 May 2007)

Grand Slam singles results
- Australian Open: Q2 (2007)
- Wimbledon: Q2 (2007)
- US Open: Q1 (2004, 2006, 2007)

Doubles
- Career record: 1–8
- Career titles: 0
- Highest ranking: No. 151 (13 August 2007)

Grand Slam doubles results
- US Open: 2R (2005)
- Last updated on: 15 November 2021.

Scott Oudsema (born July 1, 1986) is a former professional tennis player from the United States.

== Career ==
Oudsema partnered Phillip Simmonds to win the doubles at the 2002 Orange Bowl. He also competed with Simmonds at the 2003 Australian Open and the pair won the boys' doubles title. In 2004, Oudsema won a further three junior Grand Slam tournaments, the Australian Open, Wimbledon Championships and US Open, all with Brendan Evans. In the only Grand Slam the pair didn't win, the French Open, they were semi-finalists. Also in 2004, before a large home-town crowd, Oudsema lost in the USTA Boys 18 singles finals to Scoville Jenkins.

On the men's tour, Oudsema competed in the doubles at the US Open four times, but only once made the second round, in 2005 with Alex Kuznetsov. His only singles win at ATP Tour level came in the 2006 Countrywide Classic, where he defeated Benjamin Becker in the opening round, before losing to Andy Roddick. He won three ATP Challenger tournaments during his career, one in singles and two in doubles.

In the summer of 2009, Oudsema along with coach Murphy Jensen, Olga Puchkova, Leander Paes, Rennae Stubbs, and Nadia Petrova, led the Washington Kastles, to its first World Team Tennis title. He was the 2009 WTT Finals MVP. He retired in 2009.

== Junior Grand Slam finals ==
=== Doubles: 4 (4 titles) ===
Result	Year	Tournament	Surface	Partner	Opponents	Score
Win	2003	Australian Open	Hard	(United States) Phillip Simmonds	(Romania) Florin Mergea (Romania) Horia Tecău	6–4, 6–4
Win	2004	Australian Open	Hard	(United States) Brendan Evans	(Australia) David Galic (Australia) David Jeflea	6–1, 6–1
Win	2004	Wimbledon	Grass	(United States) Brendan Evans	(Netherlands) Robin Haase (Serbia) Viktor Troicki	6–4, 6–4
Win	2004	US Open	Hard	(United States) Brendan Evans	(Germany) Sebastian Rieschick (Germany) Andreas Beck	4–6, 6–1, 6–2

== ATP Challenger and ITF Futures finals ==
=== Singles: 5 (1–4) ===
Legend ATP Challenger (1–0) ITF Futures (0–4)	Finals by surface Hard (1–4) Clay (0–0) Grass (0–0) Carpet (0–0)

Result	W–L	Date	Tournament	Tier	Surface	Opponent	Score
Loss	0–1	Oct 2005	USA F27, Waco	Futures	Hard	(Germany) Benjamin Becker	6–7^{(4–7)}, 1–6
Loss	0–2	Mar 2006	USA F7, Little Rock	Futures	Hard	(United States) Wayne Odesnik	2–6, 2–6
Win	1–2	Aug 2006	Binghamton, United States	Challenger	Hard	(Slovakia) Lukáš Lacko	7–6^{(7–5)}, 6–2
Loss	1–3	Sep 2007	France F13, Mulhouse	Futures	Hard	(New Zealand) Daniel King-Turner	6–7^{(5–7)}, 3–6
Loss	1–4	Jan 2009	Great Britain F2, Sheffield	Futures	Hard	(Slovakia) Lukáš Lacko	6–7^{(5–7)}, 7–5, 3–6

=== Doubles: 12 (6–6) ===
Legend ATP Challenger (2–3) ITF Futures (4–3)	Finals by surface Hard (6–6) Clay (0–0) Grass (0–0) Carpet (0–0)

Result	W–L	Date	Tournament	Tier	Surface	Partner	Opponents	Score
Win	1–0	Oct 2004	USA F26, Irvile	Futures	Hard	(United States) Brendan Evans	(United States) Scott Lipsky (United States) David Martin	7–6^{(9–7)}, 3–6, 6–4
Win	2–0	Nov 2004	USA F31, Waikoloa	Futures	Hard	(United States) Brendan Evans	(United States) Scoville Jenkins (United States) Phillip Simmonds	6–7^{(4–7)}, 7–6^{(7–2)}, 6–4
Loss	2–1	Sep 2005	Lubbock, United States	Challenger	Hard	(United States) Jan-Michael Gambill	(United States) Hugo Armando (United States) Glenn Weiner	7–5, 2–6, 6–7^{(7–9)}
Win	3–1	Jan 2006	USA F2, Kissimmee	Futures	Hard	(United States) Alex Kuznetsov	(United States) Brian Wilson (United States) Jeremy Wurtzman	6–3, 6–2
Loss	3–2	Mar 2006	USA F7, Little Rock	Futures	Hard	(United States) Brendan Evans	(Colombia) Michael Quintero Aguilar (South Africa) Wesley Whitehouse	4–6, 2–6
Win	4–2	Jun 2006	USA F12, Rocklin	Futures	Hard	(South Africa) Kevin Anderson	(Chile) Jorge Aguilar (Mexico) Daniel Garza	6–3, 7–5
Win	5–2	Jan 2007	Waikoloa, United States	Challenger	Hard	(United States) Brendan Evans	(United States) Scott Lipsky (United States) David Martin	4–6, 6–3, [12–10]
Win	6–2	Aug 2007	Binghamton, United States	Challenger	Hard	(United States) Ryan Sweeting	(United Kingdom) Richard Bloomfield (South Korea) Im Kyu-Tae	7–6^{(7–5)}, 7–5
Loss	6–3	Jun 2008	Yuba City, United States	Challenger	Hard	(United States) Jan-Michael Gambill	(United States) Nicholas Monroe (United States) Michael Yani	4–6, 4–6
Loss	6–4	Jun 2008	USA F13, Sacramento	Futures	Hard	(United States) Gregory Ouellette	(New Zealand) Daniel King-Turner (New Zealand) G.D. Jones	2–6, 6–4, [5–10]
Loss	6–5	Mar 2009	Great Britain F3, Tipton	Futures	Hard	(United States) Phillip Simmonds	(United Kingdom) Dan Evans (Finland) Henri Kontinen	7–6^{(7–5)}, 6–7^{(4–7)}, [4–10]
Loss	6–6	Apr 2009	Baton Rouge, United States	Challenger	Hard	(India) Harsh Mankad	(United States) Bobby Reynolds (United States) Rajeev Ram	3–6, 7–6^{(8–6)}, [3–10]

== Performance timeline ==
Key
W	F	SF	QF	#R	RR	Q#	DNQ	A	NH

(W) winner; (F) finalist; (SF) semifinalist; (QF) quarterfinalist; (#R) rounds 4, 3, 2, 1; (RR) round-robin stage; (Q#) qualification round; (DNQ) did not qualify; (A) absent; (NH) not held; (SR) strike rate (events won / competed); (W–L) win–loss record.

=== Singles ===
Tournament	2004	2005	2006	2007	2008	SR	W–L	Win%
Grand Slam tournaments
Australian Open	A	A	A	Q2	Q1	0 / 0	0–0	–
French Open	A	A	A	A	A	0 / 0	0–0	–
Wimbledon	A	A	A	Q2	A	0 / 0	0–0	–
US Open	Q1	A	Q1	Q1	A	0 / 0	0–0	–
Win–loss	0–0	0–0	0–0	0–0	0–0	0 / 0	0–0	–
ATP Tour Masters 1000
Indian Wells	A	A	A	Q1	A	0 / 0	0–0	–
Cincinnati	A	A	A	A	Q2	0 / 0	0–0	–
Win–loss	0–0	0–0	0–0	0–0	0–0	0 / 0	0–0	–
