= Phillip Simmonds =

American tennis player

- Country (sports): United States
- Residence: Virginia, United States
- Born: May 18, 1986 (age 39) Selden, New York
- Plays: Right-handed
- Prize money: $191,421

Singles
- Career record: 0–3
- Career titles: 0
- Highest ranking: No. 219 (2 October 2006)

Grand Slam singles results
- Australian Open: Q1 (2006)
- French Open: Q1 (2007)
- Wimbledon: Q1 (2006, 2007)
- US Open: 1R (2006)

Doubles
- Career record: 1–6
- Career titles: 0
- Highest ranking: No. 200 (11 June 2007)

Grand Slam doubles results
- US Open: 1R (2004, 2006, 2007)

Grand Slam mixed doubles results
- US Open: 1R (2004)
- Last updated on: 11 September 2021.

Phillip Simmonds (born May 18, 1986) is a professional tennis player from the United States.

== Junior career ==
Simmonds had a promising junior career, spending time as the number ranked doubles player on the ITF rankings. He was a member of the United States team that finished runners-up in the 2002 Junior Davis Cup and in the same year won the doubles at the Orange Bowl, with Scott Oudsema. Simmonds and Oudsema would go on to claim the 2003 Australian Open boys' doubles title, the first American male pairing to win the competition. They defeated the Romanian pairing of Florin Mergea and Horia Tecău in the final. In 2003, he also reached the boys' doubles semi-finals at the French Open and Wimbledon, partnering Brian Baker.

== Professional career ==
Simmonds was given a wildcard into the 2006 US Open main draw, but couldn't get past 25th seed Richard Gasquet in the opening round. He competed in the men's doubles at the US Open three times, in 2004, 2006, and 2007, but fell in the first round each time.

He has won three Challenger titles in his career. In 2006 he won the singles title at the León Challenger tournament and he has also won two doubles titles, at Nouméa in 2007 and Baton Rouge the following year. As of the end of 2012, he has won nine ITF Futures titles, three in singles and six in doubles.

== Junior Grand Slam finals ==
=== Doubles: 1 (1 title) ===
Result	Year	Championships	Surface	Partner	Opponent	Score
Win	2003	Australian Open	Hard	(United States) Scott Oudsema	(Romania) Florin Mergea (Romania) Horia Tecău	6–4, 6–4

== ATP Challenger and ITF Futures finals ==
=== Singles: 6 (4–2) ===
Legend ATP Challenger (1–1) ITF Futures (3–1)	Finals by surface Hard (3–1) Clay (1–1) Grass (0–0) Carpet (0–0)

Result	W–L	Date	Tournament	Tier	Surface	Opponent	Score
Loss	0–1	Oct 2005	Sacramento, United States	Challenger	Hard	(South Africa) Rik de Voest	6–1, 3–6, 4–6
Win	1–1	Jan 2006	USA F3, Boca Raton	Futures	Hard	(Peru) Iván Miranda	5–7, 6–4, 7–6^{(7–3)}
Win	2–1	Apr 2006	León, Mexico	Challenger	Hard	(Belgium) Dick Norman	3–6, 7–6^{(7–4)}, 6–2
Loss	2–2	Nov 2010	USA F30, Pensacola	Futures	Clay	(Germany) Dennis Bloemke	1–6, 3–6
Win	3–2	Jan 2011	USA F3, Weston	Futures	Clay	(United States) Jack Sock	6–2, 6–2
Win	4–2	Jun 2012	USA F15, Chico	Futures	Hard	(United States) Michael McClune	4–6, 6–2, 6–2

=== Doubles: 13 (8–5) ===
Legend ATP Challenger (2–1) ITF Futures (6–4)	Finals by surface Hard (6–4) Clay (2–1) Grass (0–0) Carpet (0–0)

Result	W–L	Date	Tournament	Tier	Surface	Partner	Opponents	Score
Win	1–0	May 2003	USA F11, Orange Park	Futures	Clay	(United States) Brian Baker	(South Africa) Marcos Ondruska (United States) Brendan Evans	4–6, 7–5, 6–4
Loss	1–1	Nov 2004	USA F31, Waikoloa	Futures	Hard	(United States) Scoville Jenkins	(United States) Brendan Evans (United States) Scott Oudsema	7–6^{(7–4)}, 6–7^{(2–7)}, 4–6
Win	2–1	Jan 2007	Nouméa, New Caledonia	Challenger	Hard	(United States) Alex Kuznetsov	(France) Thierry Ascione (France) Édouard Roger-Vasselin	7–6^{(7–5)}, 6–3
Loss	2–2	Jul 2007	Lexington, United States	Challenger	Hard	(United Kingdom) Ross Hutchins	(United States) Brendan Evans (United States) Ryan Sweeting	4–6, 4–6
Win	3–2	Feb 2008	USA F4, Brownsville	Futures	Hard	(Russia) Pavel Chekhov	(India) Sunil-Kumar Sipaeya (South Korea) Daniel Yoo	6–3, 6–2
Win	4–2	Mar 2008	USA F5, Harlingen	Futures	Hard	(United States) Nicholas Monroe	(United States) Brian Battistone (United States) Dann Battistone	6–3, 6–1
Win	5–2	Apr 2008	Baton Rouge, United States	Challenger	Hard	(United States) Tim Smyczek	(United States) Ryan Harrison (United States) Michael Venus	2–6, 6–1, [10–4]
Loss	5–3	Mar 2009	Great Britain F3, Tipton	Futures	Hard	(United States) Scott Oudsema	(United Kingdom) Dan Evans (Finland) Henri Kontinen	7–6^{(7–5)}, 6–7^{(4–7)}, [4–10]
Loss	5–4	Aug 2009	Netherlands F4, Enschede	Futures	Clay	(United States) Colt Gaston	(Netherlands) Boy Westerhof (Netherlands) Antal van der Duim	5–7, 2–6
Win	6–4	Oct 2009	France F17, Nevers	Futures	Hard	(United States) Colt Gaston	(Serbia) Vladimir Obradović (Sweden) Andreas Siljeström	6–4, 7–6^{(7–3)}
Loss	6–5	Sep 2010	Canada F4, Toronto	Futures	Hard	(United States) Brendan Evans	(United States) Brett Joelson (United States) Ashwin Kumar	6–3, 3–6, [7–10]
Win	7–5	May 2012	USA F12, Orange Park	Futures	Clay	(South Africa) Fritz Wolmarans	(United States) Benjamin Rogers (Australia) John-Patrick Smith	6–3, 6–7^{(5–7)}, [12–10]
Win	8–5	Jun 2012	USA F14, Sacramento	Futures	Hard	(United States) Vahid Mirzadeh	(United States) Nicolas Meister (Brazil) Pedro Zerbini	6–4, 3–6, [11–9]

== Performance timeline ==
Key
W	F	SF	QF	#R	RR	Q#	DNQ	A	NH

(W) winner; (F) finalist; (SF) semifinalist; (QF) quarterfinalist; (#R) rounds 4, 3, 2, 1; (RR) round-robin stage; (Q#) qualification round; (DNQ) did not qualify; (A) absent; (NH) not held; (SR) strike rate (events won / competed); (W–L) win–loss record.
To avoid confusion and double counting, these charts are updated at the conclusion of a tournament or when the player's participation has ended.

=== Singles ===
Tournament	2004	2005	2006	2007	2008	2009	2010	2011	SR	W–L	Win %
Grand Slam tournaments
Australian Open	A	A	A	Q1	A	A	A	A	0 / 0	0–0	–
French Open	A	A	Q1	A	A	A	A	A	0 / 0	0–0	–
Wimbledon	A	A	Q1	Q1	A	A	A	A	0 / 0	0–0	–
US Open	Q1	A	1R	Q1	A	A	A	A	0 / 1	0–1	0%
Win–loss	0–0	0–0	0–1	0–0	0–0	0–0	0–0	0–0	0 / 1	0–1	0%
ATP World Tour Masters 1000
Indian Wells	A	A	Q1	A	A	A	A	Q1	0 / 0	0–0	–
Miami	Q1	A	A	Q1	A	A	A	A	0 / 0	0–0	–
Cincinnati	Q1	A	A	A	A	A	A	A	0 / 0	0–0	–
Win–loss	0–0	0–0	0–0	0–0	0–0	0–0	0–0	0–0	0 / 0	0–0	–
