= Baton Rouge Pro Tennis Classic =

Defunct tennis tournament
- Event name: Baton Rouge
- Founded: 2006
- Abolished: 2010
- Editions: 5
- Location: Baton Rouge, Louisiana, United States
- Venue: Lamar Tennis Center
- Category: ATP Challenger Tour
- Surface: Hard
- Draw: 32S/32Q/16D/4D
- Website: www.brprotennis classic.com

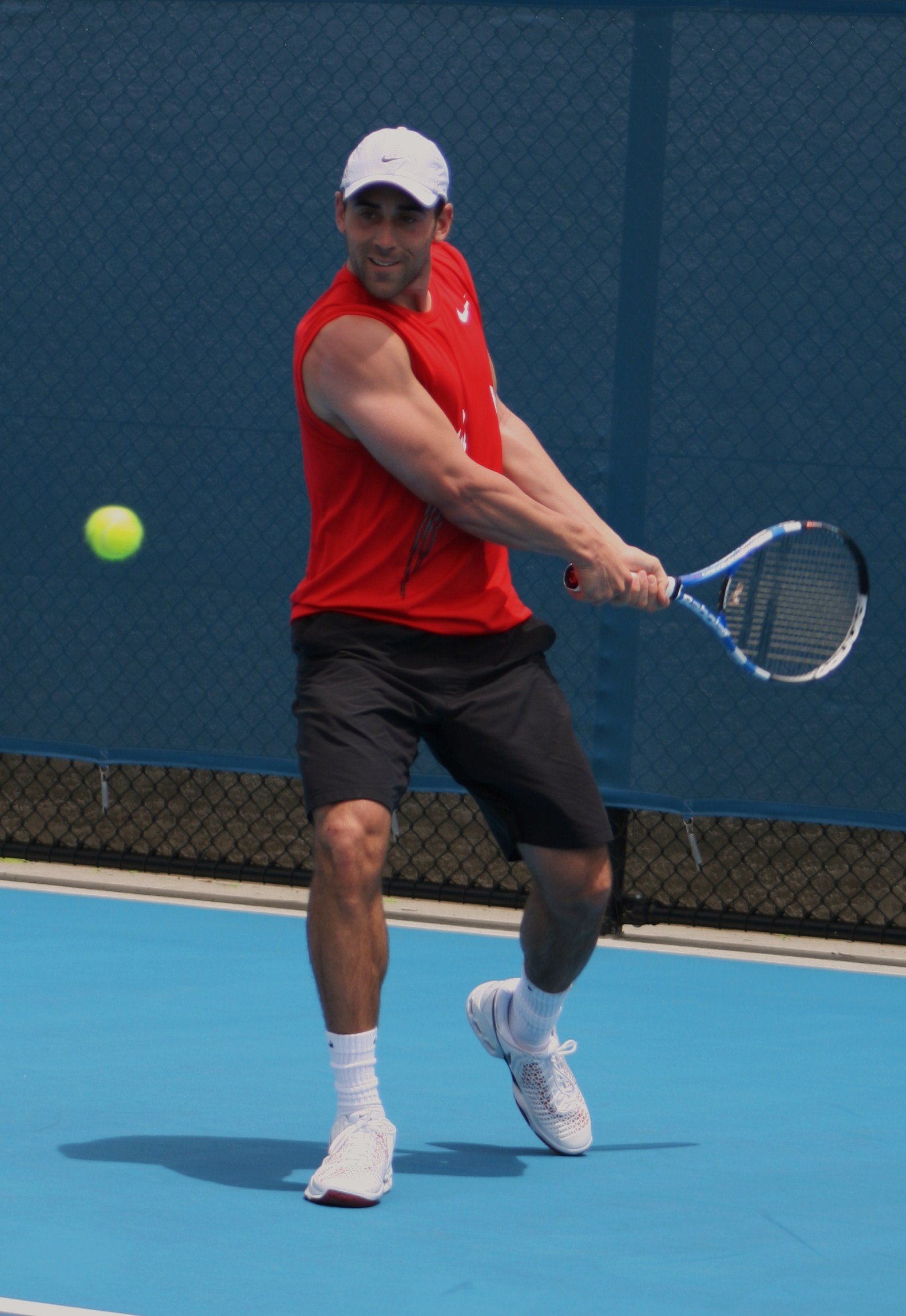
American Bobby Reynolds took the singles title in 2008, and won the doubles in 2009 with Rajeev Ram

The Baton Rouge Pro Tennis Classic was a professional tennis tournament played on outdoor hard courts. It was latterly part of the ATP Challenger Series and ATP Challenger Tour. It was held annually at the Lamar Tennis Center in Baton Rouge, Louisiana, United States, as a Futures from 2006 to 2007 and a Challenger from 2008 until 2010.

== Past finals ==
=== Singles ===
Year	Champion	Runner-up	Score
2010	(South Africa) Kevin Anderson	(Germany) Tobias Kamke	6–7(7), 7–6(7), 6–1
2009	(Germany) Benjamin Becker	(United States) Rajeev Ram	6–2, 3–6, 6–4
2008	(United States) Bobby Reynolds	(Russia) Igor Kunitsyn	6–3, 6–7(3), 7–5
2007	(South Africa) Izak van der Merwe	(Australia) Carsten Ball	6–2, 7–6(4)
2006	(Israel) Dudi Sela	(South Africa) Izak van der Merwe	5–7, 6–4, 6–3

=== Doubles ===
Year	Champions	Runners-up	Score
2010	(Australia) Stephen Huss (Australia) Joseph Sirianni	(Australia) Chris Guccione (Germany) Frank Moser	1–6, 6–2, [13–11]
2009	(United States) Rajeev Ram (United States) Bobby Reynolds	(India) Harsh Mankad (United States) Scott Oudsema	6–3, 6–7(6), [10–3]
2008	(United States) Phillip Simmonds (United States) Tim Smyczek	(United States) Ryan Harrison (United States) Michael Venus	2–6, 6–1, [10–4]
2006	(Serbia and Montenegro) Alex Vlaški (South Africa) Fritz Wolmarans	(Ukraine) Oleksandr Nedovyesov (Austria) Armin Sandbichler	7–5, 6–2
2007	(United States) Brian Battistone (United States) Dann Battistone	(Australia) Carsten Ball (United States) Rylan Rizza	6–4, 7–6(3)
