= Brendan Evans =

American tennis player (born 1986)

- Country (sports): United States
- Residence: Wesley Chapel, Florida, United States
- Born: April 8, 1986 (age 39) Pontiac, Michigan, United States
- Height: 1.88 m (6 ft 2 in)
- Turned pro: 2004
- Plays: Right-handed (two-handed backhand)
- Prize money: $411,906

Singles
- Career record: 6–15 (at ATP Tour-level, Grand Slam-level, and in Davis Cup)
- Career titles: 0
- Highest ranking: No. 117 (12 October 2009)

Grand Slam singles results
- Australian Open: Q1 (2008, 2009, 2010)
- French Open: Q1 (2009)
- Wimbledon: 2R (2010)
- US Open: 1R (2008, 2009)

Doubles
- Career record: 1–6 (at ATP Tour-level, Grand Slam-level, and in Davis Cup)
- Career titles: 0
- Highest ranking: No. 119 (26 November 2007)

Grand Slam doubles results
- Wimbledon: 1R (2008)
- US Open: 1R (2004, 2009)

Brendan Evans (born April 8, 1986) is an American retired professional tennis player.

== Tennis career ==
=== Juniors ===
On the junior circuit, Evans reached as high as No. 2 in the combined junior world rankings in July 2004, when he won the Australian Open, Wimbledon and US Open boys' doubles titles alongside Scott Oudsema. During his junior career, Evans posted win–loss records of 94–55 in singles and 103–32 in doubles.

Junior Slam results - Singles:

Australian Open: QF (2003, 2004)
French Open: SF (2004)
Wimbledon: QF (2003, 2004)
US Open: 2R (2001, 2002, 2003, 2004)

Junior Slam results - Doubles:

Australian Open: W (2004)
French Open: SF (2004)
Wimbledon: W (2004)
US Open: W (2004)

=== Nike deal ===
In 2001, Evans signed a 5-year endorsement deal with Nike at the age of 15 for a reported $1.25 million. At the time, the deal was one of the largest endorsement contracts for any junior tennis player.

=== Pro tour ===
After turning pro in 2004, Evans has competed on the ATP Challenger Tour and the ATP World Tour, both in singles and doubles. He reached his highest ATP singles ranking of world No. 117 in October 2009 and his highest ATP doubles ranking of world No. 119 in November 2007. He secured wins over top players Juan Martín del Potro, Kei Nishikori and John Isner. Evans is coached by former South African player Marcos Ondruska.

=== Top Spin 2 on Xbox 360 ===
In 2006, Evans was featured as a character in the Xbox 360 video game Top Spin 2, along with fellow pro tour players Roger Federer, Andy Roddick and James Blake.

== Career after tennis ==
Evans studied finance at The University of Virginia. Evans was named as one of the top tennis players in finance by Business Insider in 2014.

== Junior Grand Slam finals ==
=== Doubles: 4 (3 titles, 1 runner-up) ===
Result	Year	Tournament	Surface	Partner	Opponents	Score
Loss	2001	US Open	Hard	(United States) Brett Joelson	(Czech Republic) Tomáš Berdych (Switzerland) Stéphane Bohli	4–6, 4–6
Win	2004	Australian Open	Hard	(United States) Scott Oudsema	(Australia) David Galic (Australia) David Jeflea	6–1, 6–1
Win	2004	Wimbledon	Grass	(United States) Scott Oudsema	(Netherlands) Robin Haase (Serbia) Viktor Troicki	6–4, 6–4
Win	2004	US Open	Hard	(United States) Scott Oudsema	(Germany) Sebastian Rieschick (Germany) Andreas Beck	4–6, 6–1, 6–2

== ATP Challenger and ITF Futures finals ==
=== Singles: 10 (5–5) ===
Legend ATP Challenger (3–2) ITF Futures (2–3)	Finals by surface Hard (3–4) Clay (0–1) Grass (1–0) Carpet (1–0)

Result	W–L	Date	Tournament	Tier	Surface	Opponent	Score
Win	1–0	Nov 2004	USA F32, Honolulu	Futures	Hard	(United States) Wayne Odesnik	6–7^{(5–7)}, 7–6^{(7–2)}, 7–6^{(7–4)}
Loss	1–1	May 2005	USA F9, Vero Beach	Futures	Clay	(United States) Ryan Newport	3–6, 6–7^{(6–8)}
Loss	1–2	Aug 2005	USA F21, Kenosha	Futures	Hard	(United States) Ryan Newport	6–2, 3–6, 3–6
Loss	1–3	Feb 2006	USA F4, Brownsville	Futures	Hard	(United States) Michael Russell	2–6, 1–6
Win	2–3	Jun 2006	USA F12, Rocklin	Futures	Hard	(United States) David Martin	7–6^{(7–3)}, 7–5
Win	3–3	Oct 2007	Rimouski, Canada	Challenger	Carpet	(Serbia) Ilija Bozoljac	6–7^{(3–7)}, 6–4, 6–4
Loss	3–4	May 2008	New Delhi, India	Challenger	Hard	(Chinese Taipei) Lu Yen-Hsun	7–5, 6–7^{(5–7)}, 3–6
Win	4–4	Jan 2009	Noumea, New Caledonia	Challenger	Hard	(Germany) Florian Mayer	4–6, 6–3, 6–4
Loss	4–5	Feb 2009	Dallas, United States	Challenger	Hard	(United States) Ryan Sweeting	4–6, 3–6
Win	5–5	Jun 2009	Nottingham, United Kingdom	Challenger	Grass	(Serbia) Ilija Bozoljac	6–7^{(4–7)}, 6–4, 7–6^{(7–4)}

=== Doubles: 22 (7–15) ===
Legend ATP Challenger (4–8) ITF Futures (3–7)	Finals by surface Hard (7–11) Clay (0–3) Grass (0–0) Carpet (0–1)

Result	W–L	Date	Tournament	Tier	Surface	Partner	Opponents	Score
Loss	0–1	May 2003	USA F11, Orange Park	Futures	Clay	(South Africa) Marcos Ondruska	(United States) Brian Baker (United States) Phillip Simmonds	6–4, 5–7, 4–6
Win	1–1	Oct 2004	USA F26, Irvine	Futures	Hard	(United States) Scott Oudsema	(United States) Scott Lipsky (United States) David Martin	7–6^{(9–7)}, 3–6, 6–4
Win	2–1	Nov 2004	USA F31, Waikoloa	Futures	Hard	(United States) Scott Oudsema	(United States) Scoville Jenkins (United States) Phillip Simmonds	6–7^{(4–7)}, 7–6^{(7–2)}, 6–4
Loss	2–2	Nov 2005	USA F29, Honolulu	Futures	Hard	(United States) Pete Stroer	(Italy) Marco Crugnola (Italy) Stefano Ianni	6–1, 3–6, 6–7^{(4–7)}
Win	3–2	Mar 2006	USA F5, Harlingen	Futures	Hard	(United States) Tim Smyczek	(Sweden) Johan Brunstrom (United States) Philip Stolt	7–6^{(7–4)}, 6–3
Loss	3–3	Mar 2006	USA F7, Little Rock	Futures	Hard	(United States) Scott Oudsema	(Colombia) Michael Quintero (South Africa) Wesley Whitehouse	4–6, 2–6
Loss	3–4	May 2006	USA F9, Vero Beach	Futures	Clay	(United States) Troy Hahn	(United States) Jonathan Chu (South Africa) Izak Van Der Merwe	4–6, 6–7^{(0–7)}
Win	4–4	Jan 2007	Waikoloa, United States	Challenger	Hard	(United States) Scott Oudsema	(United States) Scott Lipsky (United States) David Martin	4–6, 6–3, [12–10]
Loss	4–5	Apr 2007	Mexico City, Mexico	Challenger	Hard	(United States) Brian Wilson	(Mexico) Miguel Gallardo-Valles (Mexico) Carlos Palencia	3–6, 3–6
Loss	4–6	Apr 2007	USA F8, Little Rock	Futures	Hard	(United States) Brian Wilson	(United States) Donald Young (Japan) Kei Nishikori	6–7^{(5–7)}, 4–6
Win	5–6	Jul 2007	Lexington, United States	Challenger	Hard	(United States) Ryan Sweeting	(United States) Phillip Simmonds (United Kingdom) Ross Hutchins	6–4, 6–4
Loss	5–7	Oct 2007	Rimouski, Canada	Challenger	Carpet	(United States) Alberto Francis	(New Zealand) Daniel King-Turner (Australia) Robert Smeets	5–7, 7–6^{(9–7)}, [7–10]
Loss	5–8	Nov 2007	Champaign-Urbana, United States	Challenger	Hard	(United States) Scott Lipsky	(Israel) Harel Levy (United States) Sam Warburg	4–6, 0–6
Loss	5–9	Nov 2007	Knoxville, United States	Challenger	Hard	(United Kingdom) Jamie Baker	(Israel) Harel Levy (United States) Sam Warburg	6–3, 2–6, [6–10]
Loss	5–10	Mar 2008	León, Mexico	Challenger	Hard	(United States) Alex Kuznetsov	(United States) Travis Parrott (Slovakia) Filip Polášek	4–6, 1–6
Loss	5–11	May 2008	New Delhi, India	Challenger	Hard	(India) Mustafa Ghouse	(India) Harsh Mankad (India) Ashutosh Singh	5–7, 3–6
Win	6–11	Oct 2008	Kolding, Denmark	Challenger	Hard	(South Africa) Chris Haggard	(Australia) Todd Perry (United Kingdom) James Auckland	6–3, 7–5
Loss	6–12	Nov 2008	Yokohama, Japan	Challenger	Hard	(Austria) Martin Slanar	(Czech Republic) Tomas Cakl (Slovakia) Marek Semjan	3–6, 6–7^{(1–7)}
Loss	6–13	May 2009	Zagreb, Croatia	Challenger	Clay	(United States) Ryan Sweeting	(Australia) Peter Luczak (Italy) Alessandro Motti	4–6, 4–6
Win	7–13	May 2010	Fergana, Uzbekistan	Challenger	Hard	(Japan) Toshihide Matsui	(China) Gong Maoxin (China) Zhe Li	3–6, 6–3, [10–8]
Loss	7–14	Sep 2010	Canada F4, Toronto	Futures	Hard	(United States) Phillip Simmonds	(United States) Brett Joelson (United States) Ashwin Kumar	6–3, 3–6, [7–10]
Loss	7–15	Oct 2010	Canada F5, Markham	Futures	Hard	(Canada) Chris Klingemann	(United States) Chris Kwon (United States) Conor Pollock	6–3, 6–7^{(2–7)}, [10–12]

== Performance timeline ==
Key
W	F	SF	QF	#R	RR	Q#	DNQ	A	NH

(W) winner; (F) finalist; (SF) semifinalist; (QF) quarterfinalist; (#R) rounds 4, 3, 2, 1; (RR) round-robin stage; (Q#) qualification round; (DNQ) did not qualify; (A) absent; (NH) not held; (SR) strike rate (events won / competed); (W–L) win–loss record.

=== Singles ===
Tournament	2003	2004	2005	2006	2007	2008	2009	2010	SR	W–L	Win%
Grand Slam tournaments
Australian Open	A	A	A	A	A	Q1	Q1	Q1	0 / 0	0–0	–
French Open	A	A	A	A	A	A	Q1	A	0 / 0	0–0	–
Wimbledon	A	A	A	A	Q1	Q2	Q2	2R	0 / 1	1–1	50%
US Open	A	Q3	Q1	Q1	Q1	1R	1R	A	0 / 2	0–2	0%
Win–loss	0–0	0–0	0–0	0–0	0–0	0–1	0–1	1–1	0 / 3	1–3	25%
ATP Tour Masters 1000
Indian Wells	Q1	A	Q2	A	A	Q2	1R	Q1	0 / 1	0–1	0%
Miami	Q1	Q1	1R	A	Q1	A	1R	A	0 / 2	0–2	0%
Canada Masters	A	A	A	Q1	A	A	Q1	A	0 / 0	0–0	–
Cincinnati	A	Q1	A	A	A	A	Q1	A	0 / 0	0–-0	–
Shanghai	Not Held						Q1	A	0 / 0	0–0	–
Win–loss	0–0	0–0	0–1	0–0	0–0	0–0	0–2	0–0	0 / 3	0–3	0%
