= Ryan Sweeting =

American tennis player

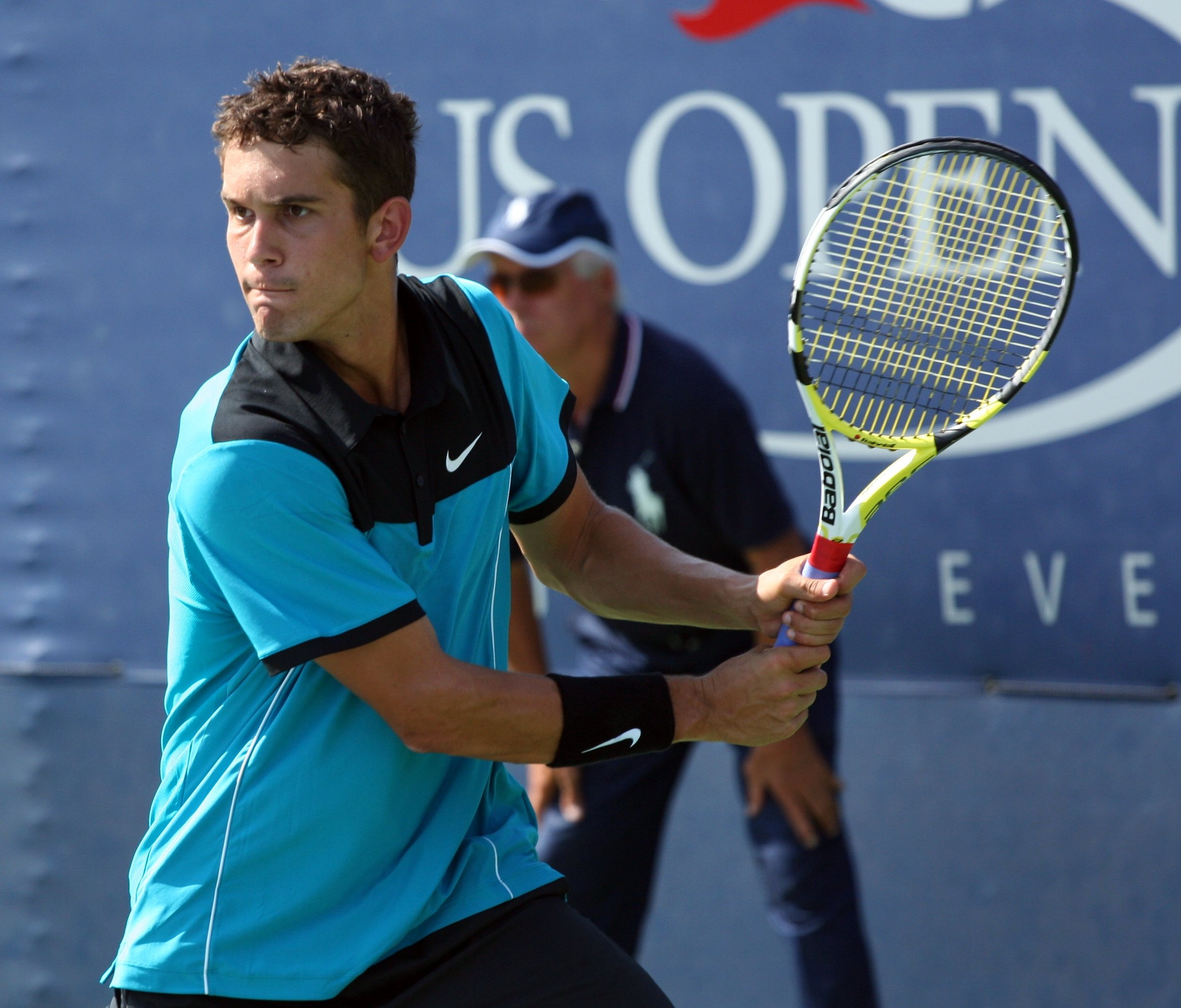
- Sweeting at the 2009 US Open
- Country (sports): United States
- Residence: Fort Lauderdale, Florida, United States
- Born: July 14, 1987 (age 38) Nassau, Bahamas
- Height: 1.96 m (6 ft 5 in)
- Turned pro: 2007
- Retired: 2015
- Plays: Right-handed (two-handed backhand)
- Prize money: $1,024,486

Singles
- Career record: 35–57
- Career titles: 1
- Highest ranking: No. 64 (12 September 2011)

Grand Slam singles results
- Australian Open: 2R (2011, 2012)
- French Open: 1R (2010, 2011)
- Wimbledon: 2R (2011, 2012)
- US Open: 2R (2006)

Doubles
- Career record: 7–26
- Career titles: 0
- Highest ranking: No. 139 (4 February 2008)

Grand Slam doubles results
- Australian Open: 1R (2012)
- French Open: 1R (2011)
- Wimbledon: 2R (2010)
- US Open: 2R (2009)

Grand Slam mixed doubles results
- US Open: 1R (2007)
- Last updated on: 16 November 2021.

Ryan Sweeting (born July 14, 1987) is an American former professional tennis player.

== Personal life ==
Sweeting was born in Nassau, Bahamas. He has been living in Fort Lauderdale, Florida and registered as an American with the ATP.

In September 2013, Sweeting became engaged to actress Kaley Cuoco after three months of dating. They married on December 31, 2013, in Santa Susana, California. Cuoco announced in September 2015 that she was filing for divorce. The divorce was finalized in May 2016.

== Tennis career ==
=== Juniors ===
Sweeting represented The Bahamas in his junior years. He attended Guizar Tennis Academy and was coached by renowned Mexican tennis coach, Nicolas Guizar. In 2005, he won the US Open Boys' Singles title, beating Jérémy Chardy in the final.

As a junior, Sweeting compiled a singles win–loss record of 94–51 (89–46 in doubles), reaching as high as no. 2 in the junior world rankings in September 2005.

=== 2006 ===
In 2006, he attended the University of Florida in Gainesville, Florida, where he played for the Florida Gators men's tennis team in NCAA competition. He made his professional US Open debut in 2006, where he defeated Argentine Guillermo Coria in the first round (Coria retired while down 3–2) before losing to Belgian Olivier Rochus in five sets. Sweeting served as a practice partner for the U.S. Davis Cup team in the 2006 World Group semifinal against Russia in Moscow.

=== 2007–2008 ===
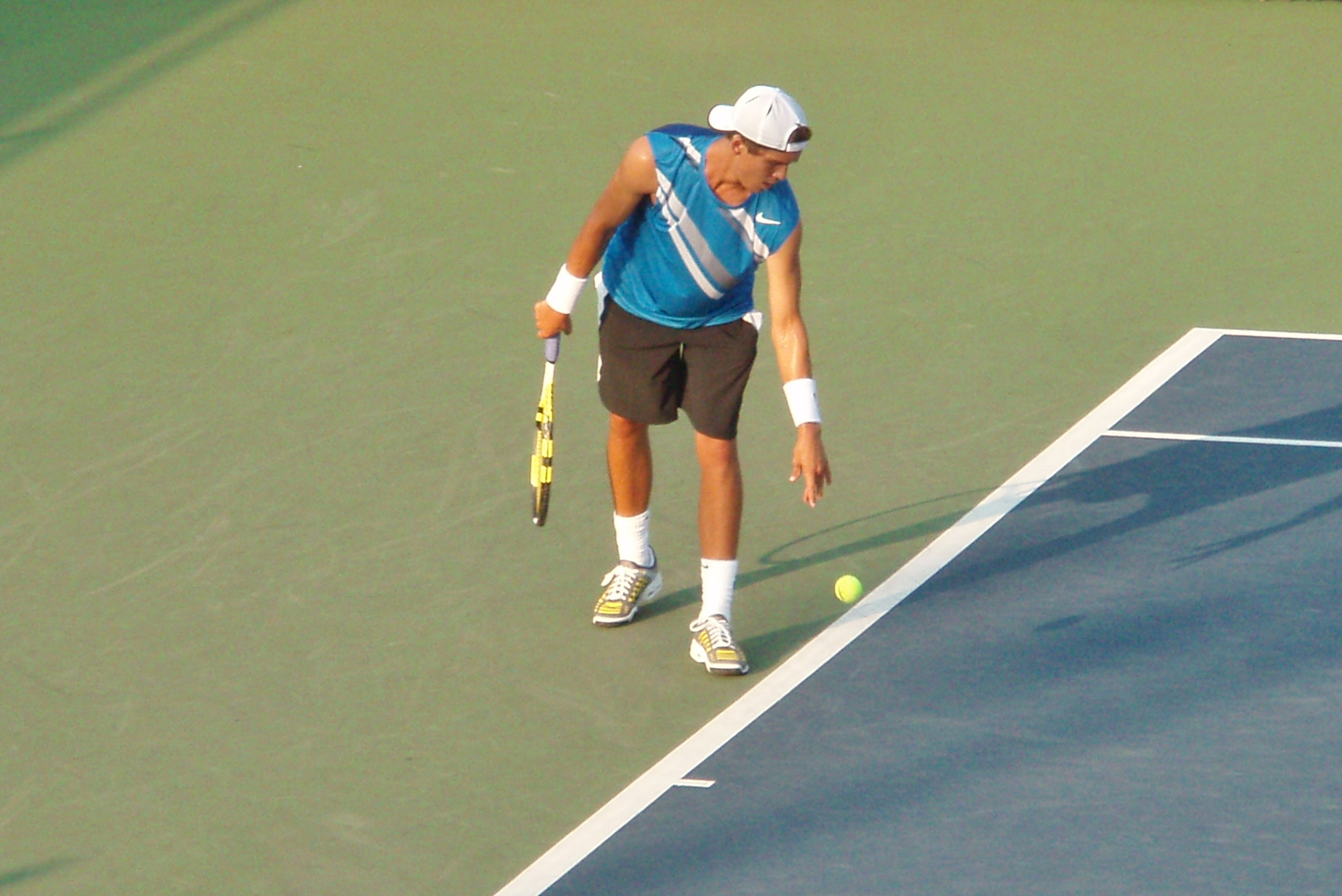
Ryan Sweeting 2007 US Open

Sweeting turned professional in 2007. Sweeting captured four ProCircuit doubles titles in 2007. He won the Rimouski Challenger in Canada in November 2008 for his first ProCircuit singles title. He finished 2008 ranked no. 216 in the ATP world rankings.

=== 2009 ===
Sweeting captured the Dallas Challenger singles title in February 2009, without dropping a set. In April, at the US Men's Clay Court Championships in Houston, Texas, Sweeting and doubles partner Jesse Levine lost to Americans Bob and Mike Bryan, ranked no. 1 in the world, in the doubles final.

=== 2011 ===
At the U.S. Men's Clay Court Championships in Houston, Sweeting won his only ATP World Tour singles title by beating Kei Nishikori of Japan in the final in straight sets.

== ATP career finals ==
=== Singles: 1 (1 title) ===
| Legend Grand Slam Tournaments (0–0) ATP World Tour Finals (0–0) ATP World Tour Masters 1000 (0–0) ATP World Tour 500 Series (0–0) ATP World Tour 250 Series (1–0) | Finals by surface Hard (0–0) Clay (1–0) Grass (0–0) Carpet (0–0) | Finals by setting Outdoors (1–0) Indoors (0–0) |

| Result | W–L | Date | Tournament | Tier | Surface | Opponent | Score |
|---|---|---|---|---|---|---|---|
| Win | 1–0 | Apr 2011 | Houston, United States | 250 Series | Clay | (Japan) Kei Nishikori | 6–4, 7–6^{(7–3)} |

=== Doubles: 1 (1 runner-up) ===
| Legend Grand Slam Tournaments (0–0) ATP World Tour Finals (0–0) ATP World Tour Masters 1000 (0–0) ATP World Tour 500 Series (0–0) ATP World Tour 250 Series (0–1) | Finals by surface Hard (0–0) Clay (0–1) Grass (0–0) Carpet (0–0) | Finals by setting Outdoors (0–1) Indoors (0–0) |

| Result | W–L | Date | Tournament | Tier | Surface | Partner | Opponents | Score |
|---|---|---|---|---|---|---|---|---|
| Loss | 0–1 | Apr 2009 | Houston, United States | 250 Series | Clay | (United States) Jesse Levine | (United States) Bob Bryan (United States) Mike Bryan | 1–6, 2–6 |

== ATP Challenger and ITF Futures finals ==
=== Singles: 6 (4–2) ===
| Legend ATP Challenger (3–2) ITF Futures (1–0) | Finals by surface Hard (3–1) Clay (1–1) Grass (0–0) Carpet (0–0) |

| Result | W–L | Date | Tournament | Tier | Surface | Opponent | Score |
|---|---|---|---|---|---|---|---|
| Win | 1–0 | May 2006 | USA F9, Vero Beach | Futures | Clay | (Dominican Republic) Victor Estrella Burgos | 6–3, 6–0 |
| Win | 2–0 | Nov 2008 | Rimouski, Canada | Challenger | Hard | (Denmark) Kristian Pless | 6–4, 7–6^{(7–3)} |
| Win | 3–0 | Feb 2009 | Dallas, United States | Challenger | Hard | (United States) Brendan Evans | 6–4, 6–3 |
| Win | 4–0 | Feb 2010 | Dallas, United States | Challenger | Hard | (Australia) Carsten Ball | 6–4, 6–2 |
| Loss | 4–1 | May 2010 | Savannah, United States | Challenger | Clay | (Japan) Kei Nishikori | 4–6, 0–6 |
| Loss | 4–2 | Oct 2010 | Calabasas, United States | Challenger | Hard | (Australia) Marinko Matosevic | 6–2, 4–6, 3–6 |

=== Doubles: 8 (4–4) ===
| Legend ATP Challenger (3–3) ITF Futures (1–1) | Finals by surface Hard (4–3) Clay (0–1) Grass (0–0) Carpet (0–0) |

| Result | W–L | Date | Tournament | Tier | Surface | Partner | Opponents | Score |
|---|---|---|---|---|---|---|---|---|
| Win | 1–0 | Jan 2007 | USA F2, North Miami Beach | Futures | Hard | (United States) Tim Smyczek | (United States) James Cerretani (Mexico) Antonio Ruiz-Rosales | 6–3, 6–2 |
| Loss | 1–1 | Jan 2007 | USA F3, Boca Raton | Futures | Hard | (United States) Tim Smyczek | (United States) Joel Kielbowicz (United States) Ryan Stotland | 7–6^{(7–5)}, 4–6, 0–1 ret. |
| Win | 2–1 | Jul 2007 | Lexington, United States | Challenger | Hard | (United States) Brendan Evans | (United States) Phillip Simmonds (United Kingdom) Ross Hutchins | 6–4, 6–4 |
| Win | 3–1 | Aug 2007 | Binghamton, United States | Challenger | Hard | (United States) Scott Oudsema | (United Kingdom) Richard Bloomfield (South Korea) Im Kyu-Tae | 7–6^{(7–5)}, 7–5 |
| Win | 4–1 | Sep 2007 | Lubbock, United States | Challenger | Hard | (United States) Alex Kuznetsov | (South Africa) Rik De Voest (United States) Bobby Reynolds | 6–3, 6–2 |
| Loss | 4–2 | Apr 2008 | Tallahassee, United States | Challenger | Hard | (United States) Robert Kendrick | (United States) Rajeev Ram (United States) Bobby Reynolds | walkover |
| Loss | 4–3 | May 2009 | Zagreb, Croatia | Challenger | Clay | (United States) Brendan Evans | (Australia) Peter Luczak (Italy) Alessandro Motti | 4–6, 4–6 |
| Loss | 4–4 | Jul 2009 | Winnetka, United States | Challenger | Hard | (United States) Brett Joelson | (Australia) Carsten Ball (United States) Travis Rettenmaier | 1–6, 2–6 |

== Performance timelines ==
Key
| W | F | SF | QF | #R | RR | Q# | DNQ | A | NH |

(W) winner; (F) finalist; (SF) semifinalist; (QF) quarterfinalist; (#R) rounds 4, 3, 2, 1; (RR) round-robin stage; (Q#) qualification round; (DNQ) did not qualify; (A) absent; (NH) not held; (SR) strike rate (events won / competed); (W–L) win–loss record.

=== Singles ===
| Tournament | 2006 | 2007 | 2008 | 2009 | 2010 | 2011 | 2012 | 2013 | SR | W–L | Win% |
|---|---|---|---|---|---|---|---|---|---|---|---|
Grand Slam tournaments
| Australian Open | A | A | Q1 | Q3 | Q3 | 2R | 2R | Q3 | 0 / 2 | 2–2 | 50% |
| French Open | A | A | A | Q2 | 1R | 1R | A | A | 0 / 2 | 0–2 | 0% |
| Wimbledon | A | Q2 | Q2 | Q1 | 1R | 2R | 2R | A | 0 / 3 | 2–3 | 40% |
| US Open | 2R | 1R | 1R | 1R | 1R | 1R | A | A | 0 / 6 | 1–6 | 14% |
| Win–loss | 1–1 | 0–1 | 0–1 | 0–1 | 0–3 | 2–4 | 2–2 | 0–0 | 0 / 13 | 5–13 | 28% |
ATP Tour Masters 1000
| Indian Wells | A | Q1 | Q2 | 2R | Q2 | 3R | 2R | A | 0 / 3 | 4–3 | 57% |
| Miami | A | 1R | 2R | 1R | 1R | 1R | 1R | Q1 | 0 / 6 | 1–6 | 14% |
| Rome | A | A | A | A | A | Q1 | A | A | 0 / 0 | 0–0 | – |
| Cincinnati | A | A | A | A | Q1 | Q1 | A | A | 0 / 0 | 0–0 | – |
| Win–loss | 0–0 | 0–1 | 1–1 | 1–2 | 0–1 | 2–2 | 1–2 | 0–0 | 0 / 9 | 5–9 | 36% |

=== Doubles ===
| Tournament | 2008 | 2009 | 2010 | 2011 | 2012 | SR | W–L |
|---|---|---|---|---|---|---|---|
Grand Slam tournaments
| Australian Open | A | A | A | A | 1R | 0 / 1 | 0–1 |
| French Open | A | A | A | 1R | A | 0 / 1 | 0–1 |
| Wimbledon | A | A | 2R | A | A | 0 / 1 | 1–1 |
| US Open | 1R | 2R | 1R | 1R | A | 0 / 4 | 1–4 |
| Win–loss | 0–1 | 1–1 | 1–2 | 0–2 | 0–1 | 0 / 7 | 2–7 |

== Junior Grand Slam finals ==
=== Singles: 1 (1 title) ===
| Result | Year | Tournament | Surface | Opponent | Score |
|---|---|---|---|---|---|
| Win | 2005 | US Open | Hard | (France) Jérémy Chardy | 6–4, 6–4 |

== See also ==
- Florida Gators
- List of Florida Gators tennis players
