= Bobby Reynolds =

American tennis player

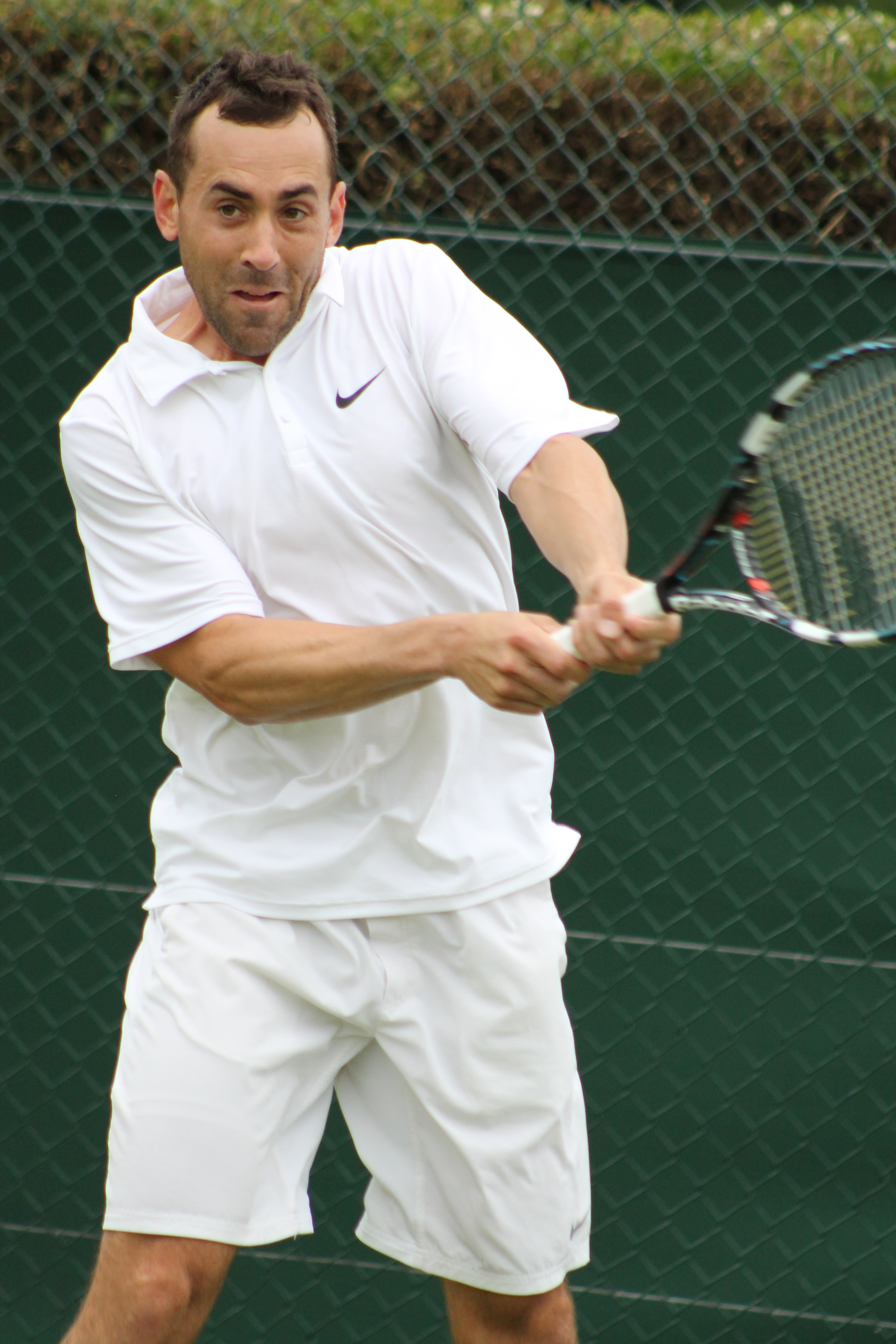
- Full name: Robert Thomas Reynolds
- Country (sports): United States
- Residence: Auburn, Alabama
- Born: July 17, 1982 (age 43) Cape Cod, Massachusetts
- Height: 6 ft 0 in (1.83 m)
- Turned pro: 2003
- Retired: 2014
- Plays: Right-handed (two-handed backhand)
- Prize money: $1,573,292

Singles
- Career record: 28–73
- Career titles: 0
- Highest ranking: No. 63 (February 2, 2009)

Grand Slam singles results
- Australian Open: 3R (2005)
- French Open: 2R (2008)
- Wimbledon: 3R (2008)
- US Open: 2R (2008)

Doubles
- Career record: 41–48
- Career titles: 1
- Highest ranking: No. 46 (May 4, 2009)

Grand Slam doubles results
- Australian Open: 3R (2009)
- French Open: 3R (2008)
- Wimbledon: 3R (2006)
- US Open: 3R (2006)
- Last updated on: 26 April 2021.

Robert Thomas "Bobby" Reynolds (born July 17, 1982) is an American retired professional tennis player who resides in Auburn, Alabama. He was named head men's tennis coach at Auburn University in June 2016.

== Professional career ==
Reynolds, a native of Acworth, Georgia, led the Vanderbilt Commodores to the NCAA Men's Tennis Championship final in 2003, and was named the tournament's MVP (he defeated fellow future pro Amer Delić of Illinois in the team final, but the Commodores fell 4–3 to the Illini in the championship). That same year, he finished the season number one in the nation in singles. He was also named ITA National Player of Month a record three times in '03, and named Southeastern Conference Player of Year in '03, finishing his final season with a 46–7 singles record. He owned the school record for career wins in singles (99) until 2015. He holds the record for single-season wins (46 in '03). Reynolds attended Vanderbilt for three years and majored in business, but left in 2003 to pursue his professional tennis aspirations.

He reached the third round of the Australian Open in 2005, defeating Nicolás Almagro and Andrei Pavel before falling to Spaniard Rafael Nadal. In August 2008 he beat world no. 42 Marc Gicquel of France 7–6, 3–6, 6–4. On February 2, 2009, he reached his career high singles ranking when he reached 63rd in the world. In 2006, he teamed with Andy Roddick to capture his first ATP doubles title at the RCA Championships in Indianapolis.

In the second round of 2012 Apia International Sydney, Reynolds won against fellow American John Isner 3–6, 6–4, 6–3, allowing him to progress to the quarterfinals, before he ultimately lost to Jarkko Nieminen from Finland.

He was coached by former pro David Drew.

Reynolds announced his retirement from professional tennis following a fourth consecutive World TeamTennis Eastern Conference Championship win with the Washington Kastles.

== Coaching career ==
Reynolds was named Auburn head coach for men's tennis in June 2016 after serving as an assistant coach for NCAA runner-up Oklahoma (2015–16 season). His career record at Auburn is 46–62 after four seasons in the nation's toughest conference. He was inducted into the Vanderbilt Sports Hall of Fame in 2019.

== ATP career finals ==
=== Doubles: 3 (1–2) ===
Legend Grand Slam Tournaments (0–0) ATP World Tour Finals (0–0) ATP World Tour Masters 1000 (0–1) ATP World Tour 500 Series (0–0) ATP World Tour 250 Series (2–1)	Titles by surface Hard (2–1) Clay (0–1) Grass (0–0) Carpet (0–0)

Result	W–L	Date	Tournament	Surface	Partner	Opponents	Score
Loss	0–1	Aug 2005	New Haven, United States	Hard	(United States) Rajeev Ram	(Argentina) Gastón Etlis (Argentina) Martín Rodríguez	4–6, 3–6
Win	1–1	Jul 2006	Indianapolis, United States	Hard	(United States) Andy Roddick	(United States) Paul Goldstein (United States) Jim Thomas	6–4, 6–4
Loss	1–2	Sep 2008	Beijing, China	Hard	(Australia) Ashley Fisher	(Australia) Stephen Huss (United Kingdom) Ross Hutchins	5–7, 4–6

== ATP Challenger and ITF Futures finals ==
=== Singles: 19 (11–8) ===
Legend ATP Challenger (10–7) ITF Futures (1–1)	Finals by surface Hard (10–8) Clay (1–0) Grass (0–0) Carpet (0–0)

Result	W–L	Date	Tournament	Tier	Surface	Opponent	Score
Loss	0–1	Jun 2003	USA F15, Chico	Futures	Hard	(United States) Matías Boeker	2–6, 2–6
Win	1–1	Sep 2004	USA F24, Claremont	Futures	Hard	(United States) Huntley Montgomery	4–6, 6–2, 6–3
Loss	1–2	Jul 2005	Lexington, United States	Challenger	Hard	(Israel) Dudi Sela	3–6, 6–3, 4–6
Loss	1–3	Sep 2005	Lubbock, United States	Challenger	Hard	(Paraguay) Ramón Delgado	6–2, 6–7^{(5–7)}, 3–6
Win	2–3	Nov 2005	Nashville, United States	Challenger	Hard	(Paraguay) Ramón Delgado	6–4, 6–4
Win	3–3	Oct 2006	Tulsa, United States	Challenger	Hard	(United States) Michael Russell	7–6^{(7–3)}, 6–3
Win	4–3	May 2007	Naples, United States	Challenger	Clay	(United States) Robert Kendrick	7–6^{(7–5)}, 6–4
Loss	4–4	Jun 2007	Yuba City, United States	Challenger	Hard	(United States) Kevin Kim	4–6, 6–0, 3–6
Loss	4–5	Jul 2007	Aptos, United States	Challenger	Hard	(United States) Donald Young	5–7, 0–6
Win	5–5	Apr 2008	Tallahassee, United States	Challenger	Hard	(United States) Robert Kendrick	5–7, 6–4, 6–3
Win	6–5	Apr 2008	Baton Rouge, United States	Challenger	Hard	(Russia) Igor Kunitsyn	6–3, 6–7^{(3–7)}, 7–5
Win	7–5	Nov 2008	Knoxville, United States	Challenger	Hard	(Slovenia) Luka Gregorc	6–4, 6–2
Win	8–5	Jun 2010	Ojai, United States	Challenger	Hard	(Australia) Marinko Matosevic	3–6, 7–5, 7–5
Win	9–5	Sep 2010	Tulsa, United States	Challenger	Hard	(United States) Lester Cook	6–3, 6–3
Loss	9–6	Mar 2011	Rimouski, Canada	Challenger	Hard	(South Africa) Fritz Wolmarans	7–6^{(7–2)}, 3–6, 6-7^{(3–7)},
Win	10–6	May 2011	Leom, Mexico	Challenger	Hard	(Germany) Andre Begemann	6–3, 6–3
Loss	10–7	Jul 2011	Winnetka, United States	Challenger	Hard	(United States) James Blake	3–6, 1–6
Win	11–7	Sep 2011	Tulsa, United States	Challenger	Hard	(United States) Michael McClune	6–1, 6–3
Loss	11–8	Nov 2012	Knoxville, United States	Challenger	Hard	(United States) Michael Russell	3–6, 2–6

=== Doubles: 43 (28–14) ===
Legend ATP Challenger (25–12) ITF Futures (3–2)	Finals by surface Hard (25–12) Clay (3–1) Grass (0–0) Carpet (0–1)

Result	W–L	Date	Tournament	Tier	Surface	Partner	Opponents	Score
Win	1–0	Aug 2002	USA F22, Decatur	Futures	Hard	(United States) John Paul Fruttero	(United States) Bo Hodge (United States) Trace Fielding	walkover
Win	2–0	Jun 2003	USA F16, Auburn	Futures	Hard	(United States) John Paul Fruttero	(United States) James Pade (United States) K.C. Corkery	6–4, 6–4
Win	3–0	Oct 2003	USA F29, Arlington	Futures	Hard	(United States) Brian Baker	(United States) Hamid Mirzadeh (United States) Vahid Mirzadeh	6–2, 6–2
Loss	3–1	Nov 2003	USA F30, Hammond	Futures	Hard	(United States) Amer Delić	(Chinese Taipei) Lu Yen-hsun (Brazil) Bruno Soares	4–6, 4–6
Loss	3–2	Sep 2004	USA F24, Claremont	Futures	Hard	(United States) Huntley Montgomery	(United States) Nick Rainey (United States) Brian Wilson	4–6, 4–6
Win	4–2	Apr 2005	Mexico City, Mexico	Challenger	Hard	(United States) Rajeev Ram	(Poland) Łukasz Kubot (South Africa) Rik de Voest	6–1, 6–7^{(7–9)}, 7–6^{(7–4)}
Win	5–2	Jul 2005	Lexington, United States	Challenger	Hard	(United States) Scoville Jenkins	(South Africa) Roger Anderson (South Africa) Rik de Voest	6–4, 6–4
Win	6–2	Oct 2005	Calabasas, United States	Challenger	Hard	(United States) Amer Delić	(South Africa) Glenn Weiner (Austria) Zbynek Mlynarik	7–5, 7–6^{(7–4)}
Win	7–2	Feb 2006	Dallas, United States	Challenger	Hard	(United States) Rajeev Ram	(United States) Mirko Pehar (Serbia and Montenegro) Dušan Vemić	6–3, 6–4
Loss	7–3	Apr 2006	Tallahassee, United States	Challenger	Hard	(United States) Tripp Phillips	(United States) Glenn Weiner (South Africa) Rik de Voest	6–3, 3–6, 0–1 ret.
Win	8–3	May 2006	Tunica Resorts, United States	Challenger	Clay	(United States) Jeff Morrison	(United States) Hugo Armando (Brazil) Ricardo Mello	3–6, 7–6^{(7–5)}, ]11–9[
Win	9–3	Oct 2006	Tulsa, United States	Challenger	Hard	(United States) Rajeev Ram	(United States) Scott Lipsky (United States) David Martin	6–4, 6–4
Loss	9–4	Feb 2007	Dallas, United States	Challenger	Hard	(United States) Rajeev Ram	(United States) Eric Butorac (United Kingdom) Jamie Murray	4–6, 7–6^{(7–4)}, [7–10]
Loss	9–5	Mar 2007	Kyoto, Japan	Challenger	Carpet	(United States) Rajeev Ram	(Thailand) Sonchat Ratiwatana (Thailand) Sanchai Ratiwatana	4–6, 3–6
Win	10–5	May 2007	Forest Hills, United States	Challenger	Clay	(United States) Rajeev Ram	(United States) Sam Warburg (United States) Patrick Briaud	6–3, 6–4
Win	11–5	Jun 2007	Carson, United States	Challenger	Hard	(United States) Rajeev Ram	(United States) Alberto Francis (Dominican Republic) Víctor Estrella Burgos	7–6^{(10–8)}, 6–2
Win	12–5	Jul 2007	Aptos, United States	Challenger	Hard	(United States) Rajeev Ram	(United States) John Paul Fruttero (Philippines) Cecil Mamiit	6–7^{(5–7)}, 6–3, [10–7]
Loss	12–6	Sep 2007	New Orleans, United States	Challenger	Hard	(United States) Rajeev Ram	(South Africa) Kevin Anderson (United States) Ryler Deheart	2–6, 3–6
Loss	12–7	Sep 2007	Lubbock, United States	Challenger	Hard	(South Africa) Rik de Voest	(United States) Alex Kuznetsov (United States) Ryan Sweeting	3–6, 2–6
Win	13–7	Sep 2007	Tulsa, United States	Challenger	Hard	(United States) Rajeev Ram	(United States) Alex Bogomolov Jr. (United States) Brian Wilson	6–4, 6–2
Win	14–7	Nov 2007	Busan, South Korea	Challenger	Hard	(United States) Rajeev Ram	(South Africa) Rik de Voest (Canada) Pierre-Ludovic Duclos	6–0, 6–2
Win	15–7	Nov 2007	Nashville, United States	Challenger	Hard	(United States) Rajeev Ram	(Australia) Ashley Fisher (Australia) Stephen Huss	6–7^{(4–7)}, 6–3, [12–10]
Win	16–7	Jan 2008	Heilbronn, Germany	Challenger	Hard	(South Africa) Rik de Voest	(Russia) Igor Kunitsyn (Pakistan) Aisam Qureshi	7–6^{(7–2)}. 6–7^{(5–7)}, [10–4]
Win	17–7	Apr 2008	Humacao, Puerto Rico	Challenger	Hard	(United States) Rajeev Ram	(United States) Kevin Kim (United States) Lester Cook	6–3, 6–4
Win	18–7	Apr 2008	Tallahassee, United States	Challenger	Hard	(United States) Rajeev Ram	(United States) Ryan Sweeting (United States) Robert Kendrick	walkover
Loss	18–8	Sep 2008	Tulsa, United States	Challenger	Hard	(United States) Rajeev Ram	(Australia) Ashley Fisher (Australia) Stephen Huss	6–7^{(4–7)}, 3–6
Win	19–8	Nov 2008	Champaign-Urbana, United States	Challenger	Hard	(United States) Rajeev Ram	(France) Olivier Charroin (France) Nicolas Tourte	3–6, 6–3, [10–6]
Loss	19–9	Nov 2008	Knoxville, United States	Challenger	Hard	(United States) Rajeev Ram	(South Africa) Kevin Anderson (New Zealand) G.D. Jones	6–3, 0–6, [7–10]
Win	20–9	Mar 2009	Sunrise, United States	Challenger	Hard	(United States) Eric Butorac	(South Africa) Jeff Coetzee (Australia) Jordan Kerr	5–7, 6–4, [10–4]
Win	21–9	Apr 2009	Baton Rouge, United States	Challenger	Hard	(United States) Rajeev Ram	(India) Harsh Mankad (United States) Scott Oudsema	6–3, 6–7^{(6–8)}, [10–3]
Loss	21–10	May 2009	Rhodes, Greece	Challenger	Hard	(United States) Rajeev Ram	(Slovakia) Karol Beck (Czech Republic) Jaroslav Levinský	3–6, 3–6
Loss	21–11	Apr 2010	Tallahassee, United States	Challenger	Hard	(United States) Robert Kendrick	(Australia) Stephen Huss (Australia) Joseph Sirianni	2–6, 4–6
Loss	21–12	May 2010	Savannah, United States	Challenger	Clay	(South Africa) Fritz Wolmarans	(United Kingdom) Jamie Baker (United Kingdom) James Ward	2–6, 4–6
Loss	21–13	Oct 2010	Calabasas, United States	Challenger	Hard	(South Africa) Rik de Voest	(United States) Ryan Harrison (United States) Travis Rettenmaier	3–6, 3–6
Win	22–13	Apr 2011	Tallahassee, United States	Challenger	Hard	(Canada) Vasek Pospisil	(Japan) Go Soeda (United Kingdom) James Ward	6–2, 6–4
Win	23–13	May 2011	Mexico City, Mexico	Challenger	Hard	(United States) Rajeev Ram	(Germany) Andre Begemann (United Kingdom) Chris Eaton	6–2, 6–2
Win	24–13	Jun 2011	Guadalajara, Mexico	Challenger	Hard	(Canada) Vasek Pospisil	(Slovakia) Ivo Klec (Canada) Pierre-Ludovic Duclos	6–4, 6–7^{(6–8)}, [10–6]
Win	25–13	Jul 2011	Winnetka, United States	Challenger	Hard	(Philippines) Treat Huey	(Australia) Jordan Kerr (United States) Travis Parrott	7–6^{(9–7)}, 6–4
Win	26–13	Sep 2011	Tulsa, United States	Challenger	Hard	(United States) David Martin	(United States) Chris Wettengel (United States) Sam Querrey	6–4, 6–2
Loss	26–14	Mar 2012	Dallas, United States	Challenger	Hard	(United States) Michael Russell	(Mexico) Santiago González (United States) Scott Lipsky	4–6, 3–6
Win	27–14	Apr 2012	Savannah, United States	Challenger	Clay	(Australia) Carsten Ball	(Germany) Simon Stadler (United States) Travis Parrott	7–6^{(9–7)}, 6–4
Win	28–14	Sep 2013	Napa, United States	Challenger	Hard	(Australia) John-Patrick Smith	(United States) Steve Johnson (United States) Tim Smyczek	6–4. 7–6^{(7–2)}

== Performance timelines ==
Key
W	F	SF	QF	#R	RR	Q#	DNQ	A	NH

(W) winner; (F) finalist; (SF) semifinalist; (QF) quarterfinalist; (#R) rounds 4, 3, 2, 1; (RR) round-robin stage; (Q#) qualification round; (DNQ) did not qualify; (A) absent; (NH) not held; (SR) strike rate (events won / competed); (W–L) win–loss record.

=== Singles ===
Tournament	2003	2004	2005	2006	2007	2008	2009	2010	2011	2012	2013	2014	W–L	SR
Grand Slam tournaments
Australian Open	A	A	3R	1R	1R	1R	1R	A	Q3	A	A	Q2	2–5	0 / 5
French Open	A	A	Q1	Q1	A	2R	1R	A	Q1	Q2	A	A	1–2	0 / 2
Wimbledon	A	A	Q1	Q1	1R	3R	1R	Q1	Q1	Q1	2R	Q2	3–4	0 / 4
US Open	Q1	1R	1R	Q2	1R	2R	Q2	A	1R	1R	Q2	A	1–6	0 / 6
Win–loss	0–0	0–1	2–2	0–1	0–3	4–4	0–3	0–0	0–1	0–1	1–1	0–0	7–17	0 / 17

=== Doubles ===
Tournament	2003	2005	2006	2007	2008	2009	2010	2011	2012	2013	W–L	SR
Grand Slam tournaments
Australian Open	A	A	1R	1R	A	3R	A	A	A	A	2–3	0 / 3
French Open	A	A	1R	A	3R	1R	A	A	A	A	2–3	0 / 3
Wimbledon	A	Q1	3R	2R	2R	A	1R	A	2R	A	5–5	0 / 5
US Open	2R	2R	3R	1R	2R	A	2R	1R	1R	1R	6–9	0 / 9
Win–loss	1–1	1–1	4–4	1–3	4–3	2–2	1–2	0–1	1–2	0–1	15–20	0 / 20
