= 2012 Natomas Men's Professional Tennis Tournament – Singles =

Singles
- 2012 Natomas Men's Professional Tennis Tournament

Final
- Champion: (United States) James Blake
- Runner-up: (Germany) Mischa Zverev
- Score: 6–1, 1–6, 6–4

Events
Singles	Doubles
← 2011 ·	Natomas Men's Professional Tennis Tournament	· 2013 →

Ivo Karlović was the defending champion but decided not to participate.
James Blake won the title, defeating Mischa Zverev 6–1, 1–6, 6–4 in the final.

== Seeds ==
1. (Germany) Benjamin Becker (first round)
2. (United States) James Blake (champion)
3. (United States) Ryan Sweeting (withdrew because of food poisoning)
4. (United States) Wayne Odesnik (first round)
5. (Italy) Matteo Viola (quarterfinals)
6. (Canada) Peter Polansky (first round, retired because of a shoulder injury)
7. (United States) Tim Smyczek (first round)
8. (United States) Denis Kudla (first round)

== Draw ==
=== Key ===
- Q = Qualifier
- WC = Wild card
- LL = Lucky loser
- Alt = Alternate
- SE = Special exempt
- PR = Protected ranking
- ITF = ITF entry
- JE = Junior exempt
- w/o = Walkover
- r = Retired
- d = Defaulted
- SR = Special ranking

=== Finals ===
Semifinals
WC	(United States) Daniel Kosakowski	2	2
(Germany) Mischa Zverev	6	6
(United States) Bobby Reynolds	2	6^{3}
2/WC	(United States) James Blake	6	7^{7}

Final
(Germany) Mischa Zverev	1	6	4
2/WC	(United States) James Blake	6	1	6

=== Top half ===
First round
1	(Germany) B Becker	5	3
WC	(United States) D Kosakowski	7	6
Q	(United States) P Simmonds	6	3	1
(United States) M McClune	1	6	6
(Colombia) R Farah	6	6
(United Kingdom) A Bogdanovic	1	2
(Australia) S Groth	2	3
5	(Italy) M Viola	6	6
LL	(South Africa) F Wolmarans	4	4
(Australia) M Reid	6	6
(United States) T Sandgren	6	6
WC	(Denmark) F Nielsen	1	2
(Germany) M Zverev	2	6	6
(Ukraine) S Bubka	6	2	3
(South Africa) I van der Merwe	6	6
7	(United States) T Smyczek	3	2

Second round
WC	(United States) D Kosakowski	4	7^{7}	6
(United States) M McClune	6	6^{5}	2
(Colombia) R Farah	3	0
5	(Italy) M Viola	6	6
(Australia) M Reid	4	3
(United States) T Sandgren	6	6
(Germany) M Zverev	7^{7}	6
(South Africa) I van der Merwe	6^{5}	3

Quarterfinals
WC	(United States) D Kosakowski	6	6
5	(Italy) M Viola	4	4
(United States) T Sandgren	2	4
(Germany) M Zverev	6	6

Semifinals
WC	(United States) D Kosakowski	2	2
(Germany) M Zverev	6	6

=== Bottom half ===
First round
6	(Canada) P Polansky	6	6^{2}	1^{r}
(United States) A El Mihdawy	3	7^{7}	4
(United States) J Sock	6^{6}	6^{4}
(United States) B Reynolds	7^{8}	7^{7}
Q	(Slovenia) L Gregorc	6	4	6^{3}
(Italy) L Vanni	4	6	7^{7}
(United States) A Kuznetsov	6	6
4	(United States) W Odesnik	4	4
8	(United States) D Kudla	3	0
Q	(Australia) G Jones	6	6
(Australia) J Millman	6^{0}	4
WC	(United States) B Klahn	7^{7}	6
(United States) R Williams	7	6^{3}	4
(South Africa) R de Voest	5	7^{7}	6
Q	(Japan) Taro Daniel	6	3	1
2/WC	(United States) J Blake	4	6	6

Second round
(United States) A El Mihdawy	3	1
(United States) B Reynolds	6	6
(Italy) L Vanni	6	6
(United States) A Kuznetsov	4	4
Q	(Australia) G Jones	6	4	3
WC	(United States) B Klahn	3	6	6
(South Africa) R de Voest	4	4
2/WC	(United States) J Blake	6	6

Quarterfinals
(United States) B Reynolds	5	6	6
(Italy) L Vanni	7	2	3
WC	(United States) B Klahn	6^{5}	6^{4}
2/WC	(United States) J Blake	7^{7}	7^{7}

Semifinals
(United States) B Reynolds	2	6^{3}
2/WC	(United States) J Blake	6	7^{7}
