= 2013 Sacramento Challenger – Doubles =

Doubles
- 2013 Sacramento Challenger

Final
- Champions: (Australia) John-Patrick Smith (Australia) Matt Reid
- Runners-up: (United States) Jarmere Jenkins (United States) Donald Young
- Score: 7–6^{(7–1)}, 4–6, [14–12]

Events
Singles	Doubles
← 2012 ·	Sacramento Challenger	· 2014 →

Tennys Sandgren and Rhyne Williams were the defending champions, but they lost in the first round.

John-Patrick Smith and Matt Reid won the title, defeating Jarmere Jenkins and Donald Young in the final, 7–6^{(7–1)}, 4–6, [14–12].

== Seeds ==
1. (Australia) Samuel Groth / (Australia) Chris Guccione (first round)
2. (Australia) John-Patrick Smith / (Australia) Matt Reid (champions)
3. (United States) Tennys Sandgren / (United States) Rhyne Williams (first round)
4. (United States) Alex Kuznetsov / (Canada) Peter Polansky (first round, withdrew)

== Draw ==
=== Key ===
- Q = Qualifier
- WC = Wild card
- LL = Lucky loser
- Alt = Alternate
- SE = Special exempt
- PR = Protected ranking
- ITF = ITF entry
- JE = Junior exempt
- w/o = Walkover
- r = Retired
- d = Defaulted
- SR = Special ranking

=== Draw ===
First round
1	(Australia) S Groth (Australia) C Guccione	6^{5}	7	[6]
(Australia) C Ball (Ukraine) D Molchanov	7^{7}	5	[10]
(United States) S Johnson (United States) T Smyczek	6^{6}	7^{7}	[10]
(El Salvador) M Arévalo (United Kingdom) D Cox	7^{8}	6^{4}	[8]
3	(United States) T Sandgren (United States) R Williams	3	2
WC	(United States) J Jenkins (United States) D Young	6	6
Q	(United States) N Meister (United States) D Nguyen
(Germany) P Gojowczyk (United States) D Zivkovic	w/o
(United States) A Krajicek (United States) D Kudla	6	6
WC	(United States) Dennis Nevolo (United States) D Novikov	1	4
WC	(United States) R Kendrick (United States) Brian Martinez	w/o
4	(United States) A Kuznetsov (Canada) P Polansky
(United States) R Ram (United States) B Reynolds
(United Kingdom) D Evans (Australia) N Kyrgios	w/o
(United States) B Klahn (Republic of Ireland) J McGee	4	2
2	(Australia) M Reid (Australia) J-P Smith	6	6

Quarterfinals
(Australia) C Ball (Ukraine) D Molchanov	2	7^{7}	[10]
(United States) S Johnson (United States) T Smyczek	6	6^{5}	[3]
WC	(United States) J Jenkins (United States) D Young	6	6
(Germany) P Gojowczyk (United States) D Zivkovic	3	2
(United States) A Krajicek (United States) D Kudla	7	2	[6]
WC	(United States) R Kendrick (United States) B Martinez	5	6	[10]
(United Kingdom) D Evans (Australia) N Kyrgios
2	(Australia) M Reid (Australia) J-P Smith	w/o

Semifinals
(Australia) C Ball (Ukraine) D Molchanov	6^{3}	4
WC	(United States) J Jenkins (United States) D Young	7^{7}	6
WC	(United States) R Kendrick (United States) B Martinez	6^{6}	5
2	(Australia) M Reid (Australia) J-P Smith	7^{8}	7

Final
WC	(United States) J Jenkins (United States) D Young	6^{1}	6	12
2	(Australia) M Reid (Australia) J-P Smith	7^{7}	3	14
