= 2010 Natomas Men's Professional Tennis Tournament – Singles =

Singles
- 2010 Natomas Men's Professional Tennis Tournament

Final
- Champion: (Australia) John Millman
- Runner-up: (United States) Robert Kendrick
- Score: 6–3, 6–2

Events
Singles	Doubles
← 2009 ·	Natomas Men's Professional Tennis Tournament	· 2011 →

Santiago Giraldo was the defending champion, but decided not to participate this year.
John Millman defeated 5th seed Robert Kendrick 6–3, 6–2 in the final match.

== Seeds ==
1. (Germany) Tobias Kamke (second round)
2. (United States) Donald Young (second round)
3. (Germany) Julian Reister (second round)
4. (United States) Ryan Sweeting (quarterfinals)
5. (United States) Robert Kendrick (final)
6. (Australia) Carsten Ball (second round)
7. (South Africa) Izak van der Merwe (first round)
8. (United States) Kevin Kim (second round)

== Draw ==
=== Key ===
- Q = Qualifier
- WC = Wild card
- LL = Lucky loser
- Alt = Alternate
- ITF = ITF entry
- PR = Protected ranking
- SR = Special ranking
- SE = Special exempt
- JE = Junior exempt
- JR = Junior Accelerator Programme entrant
- CO = College Accelerator Programme entrant
- NG = Next Gen Accelerator Program entrant
- w/o = Walkover
- r = Retired
- d = Defaulted

=== Finals ===
Semifinals
(United States) Alex Bogomolov Jr.	6	6^{2}	6^{1}
(Australia) John Millman	2	7	7
5	(United States) Robert Kendrick	6	6
(South Africa) Rik de Voest	4	1

Final
(Australia) John Millman	6	6
5	(United States) Robert Kendrick	3	2

=== Top half ===
First round
1	(Germany) T Kamke	6	4	7
PR	(Bosnia and Herzegovina) A Delić	2	6	5
PR	(Australia) C Guccione	7	6
WC	(United States) D Kudla	6^{3}	4
(United States) A Bogomolov Jr.	2	6	6
WC	(United States) M McClune	6	3	4
LL	(South Africa) A Anderson	3	7	7
7	(South Africa) I van der Merwe	6	5	6^{3}
3	(Germany) J Reister	1	6	6
Q	(Canada) P-L Duclos	6	2	3
Q	(Slovenia) L Gregorc	6	1	4
(Australia) J Millman	4	6	6
(United States) T Smyczek	6	6^{1}	2
(Denmark) F Nielsen	3	7	6
Q	(United Kingdom) D Cox	1	7	4
6	(Australia) C Ball	6	5	6

Second round
1	(Germany) T Kamke	3	4
PR	(Australia) C Guccione	6	6
(United States) A Bogomolov Jr.	6	6
LL	(South Africa) A Anderson	1	4
3	(Germany) J Reister	1	6	2
(Australia) J Millman	6	3	6
(Denmark) F Nielsen	7	3	6
6	(Australia) C Ball	6^{6}	6	2

Quarterfinals
PR	(Australia) C Guccione	3	3
(United States) A Bogomolov Jr.	6	6
(Australia) J Millman	6	6
(Denmark) F Nielsen	0	3

Semifinals
(United States) A Bogomolov Jr.	6	6^{2}	6^{1}
(Australia) J Millman	2	7	7

=== Bottom half ===
First round
5	(United States) R Kendrick	4	6	7
(United States) R DeHeart	6	3	6^{3}
(United States) A Kuznetsov	3	6	6^{4}
(United States) J Witten	6	2	7
(New Zealand) D King-Turner	4	2
(United States) L Cook	6	6
WC	(South Africa) F Wolmarans	6^{2}	5
4	(United States) R Sweeting	7	7
8	(United States) K Kim	6	6
WC	(United States) Dennis Novikov	1	1
(United Kingdom) J Baker	4	4
(South Africa) R de Voest	6	6
(Australia) M Matosevic	6	6
(United States) M Yani	2	1
Q	(Bulgaria) D Kutrovsky	4	3
2	(United States) D Young	6	6

Second round
5	(United States) R Kendrick	6	7
(United States) J Witten	4	5
(United States) L Cook	2	6	3
4	(United States) R Sweeting	6	4	6
8	(United States) K Kim	3	5
(South Africa) R de Voest	6	7
(Australia) M Matosevic	6	6
2	(United States) D Young	2	3

Quarterfinals
5	(United States) R Kendrick	6	3	6
4	(United States) R Sweeting	4	6	3
(South Africa) R de Voest	7	4	6
(Australia) M Matosevic	5	6	4

Semifinals
5	(United States) R Kendrick	6	6
(South Africa) R de Voest	4	1
