= 2013 Sacramento Challenger =

- Date: 30 September – 6 October
- Edition: 9th
- Surface: Hard
- Location: Sacramento, United States

Champions

Singles
- (United States) Donald Young

Doubles
- (Australia) John-Patrick Smith / (Australia) Matt Reid
← 2012 ·	Sacramento Challenger	· 2014 →

The 2013 Sacramento Challenger was a professional tennis tournament played on hard courts. It was the ninth edition of the tournament which was part of the 2013 ATP Challenger Tour. It took place in Sacramento, United States between 30 September and 6 October 2013.

== Singles main-draw entrants ==
=== Seeds ===
Country	Player	Rank^{1}	Seed
USA	Denis Kudla	99	1
USA	Tim Smyczek	105	2
AUS	Matthew Ebden	122	3
USA	Rajeev Ram	126	4
USA	Rhyne Williams	128	5
USA	Alex Kuznetsov	130	6
USA	Bradley Klahn	134	7
USA	Donald Young	142	8

- ^{1} Rankings are as of September 23, 2013.

=== Other entrants ===
The following players received wildcards into the singles main draw:

- (United States) Collin Altamirano
- (United States) Jarmere Jenkins
- (United States) Robert Kendrick
- (United States) Robert Noah

The following players received entry as an alternate into the singles main draw:

- (United Kingdom) Daniel Cox

The following players received entry from the qualifying draw:

- (Bulgaria) Dimitar Kutrovsky
- (Australia) Thanasi Kokkinakis
- (United States) Dennis Nevolo
- (South Africa) Fritz Wolmarans

== Champions ==
=== Singles ===
- (United States) Donald Young def. (United States) Tim Smyczek, 7–5, 6–3

=== Doubles ===
- (Australia) Matt Reid / (Australia) John-Patrick Smith def. (United States) Jarmere Jenkins / (United States) Donald Young, 7–6^{(7–1)}, 4–6, [14–12]
