= 2014 Sacramento Challenger – Singles =

Singles
- 2014 Sacramento Challenger

Final
- Champion: (United States) Sam Querrey
- Runner-up: (United States) Stefan Kozlov
- Score: 6–3, 6–4

Events
Singles	Doubles
← 2013 ·	Sacramento Challenger	· 2015 →

Tennis singles was an event at the 2014 Sacramento Challenger, the tenth and penultimate instance of the annual Sacramento Challenger tennis tournament.

Donald Young was the defending champion but chose to play in the Japan Open instead.

Sam Querrey won the title by defeating Stefan Kozlov 6–3, 6–4 in the final.

== Seeds ==
1. (United States) Sam Querrey (champion)
2. (United States) Tim Smyczek (semifinals)
3. (United States) Bradley Klahn (first round)
4. (United States) Michael Russell (first round, retired)
5. (United States) Denis Kudla (quarterfinals)
6. (Canada) Peter Polansky (first round)
7. (Netherlands) Thiemo de Bakker (first round, retired)
8. (Canada) Frank Dancevic (first round)

== Draw ==
Key

- Q = Qualifier
- WC = Wild card
- LL = Lucky loser
- Alt = Alternate
- ITF = ITF entry
- PR = Protected ranking
- SR = Special ranking
- SE = Special exempt
- JE = Junior exempt
- JR = Junior Accelerator Programme entrant
- CO = College Accelerator Programme entrant
- NG = Next Gen Accelerator Program entrant
- w/o = Walkover
- r = Retired
- d = Defaulted

=== Finals ===
Semifinals
1	(United States) Sam Querrey	5	6	6
PR	(Australia) John Millman	7	4	3
WC	(United States) Stefan Kozlov	3	6	7^{7}
2	(United States) Tim Smyczek	6	3	6^{1}

Final
1	(United States) Sam Querrey	6	6
WC	(United States) Stefan Kozlov	3	4

=== Top half ===
First round
1	(United States) S Querrey	7^{7}	6
(United Kingdom) K Edmund	6^{4}	4
WC	(United States) D Nguyen	6	7^{7}
(United States) A Kuznetsov	4	6^{4}
Q	(United Kingdom) L Broady	7^{7}	3	0
(Italy) L Vanni	6^{2}	6	6
SE	(United States) J Donaldson	6	3
7	(Netherlands) T de Bakker	2	0^{r}
4	(United States) M Russell	2^{r}
Q	(Bulgaria) D Kutrovsky	3
PR	(Australia) J Millman	4	6	7^{7}
PR	(United States) T Sandgren	6	3	6^{3}
(Australia) A Bolt	4	4
Q	(United States) M Giron	6	6
WC	(United States) B Fratangelo	6	6
8	(Canada) F Dancevic	4	4

Second round
1	(United States) S Querrey	6	7^{7}
(United States) D Nguyen	3	6^{3}
(Italy) L Vanni	6^{3}	6^{5}
SE	(United States) J Donaldson	7^{7}	7^{7}
Q	(Bulgaria) D Kutrovsky	5	3
PR	(Australia) J Millman	7	6
Q	(United States) M Giron	6^{3}	5
WC	(United States) B Fratangelo	7^{7}	7

Quarterfinals
1	(United States) S Querrey	6	6
SE	(United States) J Donaldson	2	1
PR	(Australia) J Millman	6	6
WC	(United States) B Fratangelo	1	2

Semifinals
1	(United States) S Querrey	5	6	6
PR	(Australia) J Millman	7	4	3

=== Bottom half ===
First round
6	(Canada) P Polansky	7	4	6^{5}
(United States) W Odesnik	5	6	7^{7}
(United States) R Williams	4	7^{7}	7^{7}
(Republic of Ireland) L Sorensen	6	6^{3}	6^{2}
WC	(United States) S Kozlov	6	3	6
(United States) R Harrison	1	6	3
(Australia) J-P Smith	6	2	6
3	(United States) B Klahn	2	6	3
5	(United States) D Kudla	6	6
WC	(United States) C Altamirano	1	1
Q	(United States) E Quigley	6	0	6^{2}
Alt	(Sweden) E Ymer	3	6	7^{7}
(United States) R Ginepri	4	1
(Republic of Ireland) J McGee	6	6
(Australia) J Thompson	1	2
2	(United States) T Smyczek	6	6

Second round
(United States) W Odesnik	4	2^{r}
(United States) R Williams	6	4
WC	(United States) S Kozlov	6	3	6
(Australia) J-P Smith	4	6	4
5	(United States) D Kudla	6	2	6
Alt	(Sweden) E Ymer	4	6	3
(Republic of Ireland) J McGee	4	3
2	(United States) T Smyczek	6	6

Quarterfinals
(United States) R Williams	6	6^{3}	4
WC	(United States) S Kozlov	4	7^{7}	6
5	(United States) D Kudla	2	1
2	(United States) T Smyczek	6	6

Semifinals
WC	(United States) S Kozlov	3	6	7^{7}
2	(United States) T Smyczek	6	3	6^{1}
