= 2012 Natomas Men's Professional Tennis Tournament – Doubles =

Doubles
- 2012 Natomas Men's Professional Tennis Tournament

Final
- Champions: (United States) Tennys Sandgren (United States) Rhyne Williams
- Runners-up: (United States) Devin Britton (United States) Austin Krajicek
- Score: 4–6, 6–4, [12–10]

Events
Singles	Doubles
← 2011 ·	Natomas Men's Professional Tennis Tournament	· 2013 →

Carsten Ball and Chris Guccione were the defending champions but Ball decided not to participate.
Guccione played alongside Samuel Groth.
Tennys Sandgren and Rhyne Williams won the title against Devin Britton and Austin Krajicek by defeating them 4–6, 6–4, [12–10] in the final.

== Seeds ==
1. (Australia) Jordan Kerr / (Sweden) Andreas Siljeström (first round)
2. (South Africa) Rik de Voest / (Colombia) Robert Farah (first round)
3. (United States) Bobby Reynolds / (South Africa) Izak van der Merwe (quarterfinals)
4. (Romania) Andrei Dăescu / (Australia) Adam Hubble (quarterfinals)

== Draw ==
=== Key ===
- Q = Qualifier
- WC = Wild card
- LL = Lucky loser
- Alt = Alternate
- SE = Special exempt
- PR = Protected ranking
- ITF = ITF entry
- JE = Junior exempt
- w/o = Walkover
- r = Retired
- d = Defaulted
- SR = Special ranking

=== Draw ===
First round
1	(Australia) J Kerr (Sweden) A Siljeström	3	4
(United States) W Odesnik (Italy) L Vanni	6	6
WC	(United States) T Sandgren (United States) R Williams	6	3	[10]
WC	(United States) D Kosakowsi (United States) N Meister	2	6	[7]
3	(United States) B Reynolds (South Africa) I van der Merwe	6	2	[10]
Q	(United States) J Dadamo (United States) B Klahn	3	6	[8]
(United States) A Kuznetsov (Germany) M Zverev	6	6
(Italy) S Ianni (Italy) M Viola	3	4
(Australia) S Groth (Australia) C Guccione	4	7^{7}	[10]
WC	(United States) P Simmonds (United States) J Sock	6	7^{5}	[4]
LL	(Slovenia) L Gregorc (Croatia) Ante Pavić	3	4
4	(Romania) A Dăescu (Australia) A Hubble	6	6
(United States) D Kudla (United States) T Smyczek	1	7^{7}	[11]
(United States) D Courtney (India) P Raja	6	6^{5}	[13]
(United States) D Britton (United States) A Krajicek	7^{7}	7^{7}
2	(South Africa) R de Voest (Colombia) R Farah	6^{4}	6^{4}

Quarterfinals
(United States) W Odesnik (Italy) L Vanni	3	1
WC	(United States) T Sandgren (United States) R Williams	6	6
3	(United States) B Reynolds (South Africa) I van der Merwe	5	7	[3]
(United States) A Kuznetsov (Germany) M Zverev	7	5	[10]
(Australia) S Groth (Australia) C Guccione	6	6
4	(Romania) A Dăescu (Australia) A Hubble	1	4
(United States) D Courtney (India) P Raja	6^{4}	7^{7}	[5]
(United States) D Britton (United States) A Krajicek	7^{7}	6^{5}	[10]

Semifinals
WC	(United States) T Sandgren (United States) R Williams	6	6
(United States) A Kuznetsov (Germany) M Zverev	4	4
(Australia) S Groth (Australia) C Guccione	6^{2}	6	[8]
(United States) D Britton (United States) A Krajicek	7^{7}	2	[10]

Final
(United States) T Sandgren (United States) R Williams	4	6	[12]
(United States) D Britton (United States) A Krajicek	6	4	[10]
