= 2011 Natomas Men's Professional Tennis Tournament – Singles =

Singles
- 2011 Natomas Men's Professional Tennis Tournament

Final
- Champion: (Croatia) Ivo Karlović
- Runner-up: (United States) James Blake
- Score: 6–4, 3–6, 6–4

Events
Singles	Doubles
← 2010 ·	Natomas Men's Professional Tennis Tournament	· 2012 →

John Millman was the defending champion, but did not participate.
Ivo Karlović won the title, defeating James Blake 6–4, 3–6, 6–4 in the final.

== Seeds ==
1. (United States) James Blake (final)
2. (Croatia) Ivo Karlović (champion)
3. (United States) Sam Querrey (semifinals)
4. (United States) Bobby Reynolds (quarterfinals)
5. (Canada) Vasek Pospisil (first round)
6. (South Africa) Izak van der Merwe (second round)
7. (Germany) Björn Phau (second round)
8. (United Kingdom) James Ward (first round)

== Draw ==
=== Key ===
- Q = Qualifier
- WC = Wild card
- LL = Lucky loser
- Alt = Alternate
- SE = Special exempt
- PR = Protected ranking
- ITF = ITF entry
- JE = Junior exempt
- w/o = Walkover
- r = Retired
- d = Defaulted
- SR = Special ranking

=== Finals ===
Semifinals
1	(United States) James Blake	6	7
(United States) Alex Kuznetsov	2	5
3/WC	(United States) Sam Querrey	6^{6}	6	4
2	(Croatia) Ivo Karlović	7^{8}	3	6

Final
1	(United States) James Blake	4	6	4
2	(Croatia) Ivo Karlović	6	3	6

=== Top half ===
First round
1	(United States) J Blake	6	7
(Bosnia and Herzegovina) A Delić	4	5
(Australia) C Guccione	6	6
(Colombia) JS Cabal	3	4
(Moldova) R Borvanov	3	6	6
Q	(United States) S Johnson	6	4	3
WC	(United States) J Sock	6	7^{7}
8	(United Kingdom) J Ward	3	6^{3}
4	(United States) B Reynolds	6	2	7
(Colombia) C Salamanca	3	6	5
(Denmark) F Nielsen	6	5	6
WC	(United States) N Monroe	2	7	4
(Germany) S Greul	6	4	4
(United States) A Kuznetsov	4	6	6
Q	(United States) B Strode	3	4
6	(South Africa) I van der Merwe	6	6

Second round
1	(United States) J Blake	6	6
(Australia) C Guccione	4	4
(Moldova) R Borvanov	1	6	3
WC	(United States) J Sock	6	3	6
4	(United States) B Reynolds	6	5	6
(Denmark) F Nielsen	2	7	2
(United States) A Kuznetsov	6	6
6	(South Africa) I van der Merwe	4	2

Quarterfinals
1	(United States) J Blake	6	6
WC	(United States) J Sock	4	2
4	(United States) B Reynolds	6^{0}	3
(United States) A Kuznetsov	7^{7}	6

Semifinals
1	(United States) J Blake	6	7
(United States) A Kuznetsov	2	5

=== Bottom half ===
First round
7	(Germany) B Phau	6	6
SE	(Colombia) R Farah	1	4
(Belarus) U Ignatik	3	6	6
(South Africa) F Wolmarans	6	3	4
(Germany) D Gremelmayr	6	3	6
LL	(United Kingdom) J Baker	1	6	4
(Lithuania) L Grigelis	4	7^{7}	2
3/WC	(United States) S Querrey	6	6^{5}	6
5	(Canada) V Pospisil	7^{7}	6^{2}	3
(Netherlands) T de Bakker	6^{5}	7^{7}	6
(United States) T Smyczek	2	5
Q	(Canada) P-L Duclos	6	7
Q	(New Zealand) M Venus	2	4
(Dominican Republic) V Estrella	6	6
(Austria) M Fischer	3	6	6^{8}
2	(Croatia) I Karlović	6	3	7^{10}

Second round
7	(Germany) B Phau	4	6^{4}
(Belarus) U Ignatik	6	7^{7}
(Germany) D Gremelmayr	7^{7}	6^{1}	3
3/WC	(United States) S Querrey	6^{4}	7^{7}	6
(Netherlands) T de Bakker	6	2	6
Q	(Canada) P-L Duclos	4	6	4
(Dominican Republic) V Estrella	3	2
2	(Croatia) I Karlović	6	6

Quarterfinals
(Belarus) U Ignatik	5	6^{9}
3/WC	(United States) S Querrey	7	7^{11}
(Netherlands) T de Bakker	4	6^{2}
2	(Croatia) I Karlović	6	7^{7}

Semifinals
3/WC	(United States) S Querrey	6^{6}	6	4
2	(Croatia) I Karlović	7^{8}	3	6
