= 2011 Natomas Men's Professional Tennis Tournament – Doubles =

Doubles
- 2011 Natomas Men's Professional Tennis Tournament

Final
- Champions: (Australia) Carsten Ball (Australia) Chris Guccione
- Runners-up: (United States) Nicholas Monroe (United States) Jack Sock
- Score: 7–6^{(7–3)}, 1–6, [10–5]

Events
Singles	Doubles
← 2010 ·	Natomas Men's Professional Tennis Tournament	· 2012 →

Rik de Voest and Izak van der Merwe were the defending champions, but only van der Merwe decided to participate. He played alongside Treat Conrad Huey, but Carsten Ball and Chris Guccione eliminated them already in the first round. Ball and Guccione went on to win the title by defeating Nicholas Monroe and Jack Sock 7–6^{(7–3)}, 1–6, [10–5] in the final.

== Seeds ==
1. (Colombia) Juan Sebastián Cabal / (Colombia) Robert Farah (first round)
2. (Philippines) Treat Conrad Huey / (South Africa) Izak van der Merwe (first round)
3. (Denmark) Frederik Nielsen / (United States) Travis Parrott (quarterfinals)
4. (Australia) Jordan Kerr / (United States) David Martin (quarterfinals)

== Draw ==
=== Key ===
- Q = Qualifier
- WC = Wild card
- LL = Lucky loser
- Alt = Alternate
- SE = Special exempt
- PR = Protected ranking
- ITF = ITF entry
- JE = Junior exempt
- w/o = Walkover
- r = Retired
- d = Defaulted
- SR = Special ranking

=== Draw ===
First round
1	(Colombia) JS Cabal (Colombia) R Farah	6^{6}	3
(United States) JP Fruttero (South Africa) R Klaasen	7^{8}	6
(Dominican Republic) V Estrella (Croatia) I Karlović	4	6	[13]
WC	(United States) N Monroe (United States) J Sock	6	4	[15]
4	(Australia) J Kerr (United States) D Martin	6	6
WC	(Australia) Junaid Hossain (United States) Brian Martinez	4	2
(United States) T Rettenmaier (Germany) S Stadler	6	3	[10]
(Germany) D Gremelmayr (Germany) B Phau	3	6	[8]
(Canada) V Pospisil (United States) B Reynolds	5	6	[17]
WC	(United States) S Johnson (United States) S Querrey	7	3	[15]
Q	(Canada) P-L Duclos (Australia) Adam Hubble	1	4
3	(Denmark) F Nielsen (United States) T Parrott	6	6
(Thailand) Sa Ratiwatana (Thailand) So Ratiwatana	6	6^{2}	[15]
LL	(Lithuania) L Grigelis (Belarus) U Ignatik	2	7^{7}	[13]
(Australia) C Ball (Australia) C Guccione	2	7^{8}	[10]
2	(Philippines) TC Huey (South Africa) I van der Merwe	6	6^{6}	[4]

Quarterfinals
(United States) JP Fruttero (South Africa) R Klaasen	3	6	[8]
WC	(United States) N Monroe (United States) J Sock	6	3	[10]
4	(Australia) J Kerr (United States) D Martin	3	6	[9]
(United States) T Rettenmaier (Germany) S Stadler	6	4	[11]
(Canada) V Pospisil (United States) B Reynolds	7^{9}	7^{7}
3	(Denmark) F Nielsen (United States) T Parrott	6^{7}	6^{5}
(Thailand) Sa Ratiwatana (Thailand) So Ratiwatana	6^{5}	4
(Australia) C Ball (Australia) C Guccione	7^{7}	6

Semifinals
WC	(United States) N Monroe (United States) J Sock	6	6
(United States) T Rettenmaier (Germany) S Stadler	4	4
(Canada) V Pospisil (United States) B Reynolds	2	4
(Australia) C Ball (Australia) C Guccione	6	6

Final
WC	(United States) N Monroe (United States) J Sock	6^{3}	6	[5]
(Australia) C Ball (Australia) C Guccione	7^{7}	1	[10]
