= 2012 Natomas Men's Professional Tennis Tournament =

- Date: 1–7 October
- Edition: 8th
- Surface: Hard
- Location: Sacramento, United States

Champions

Singles
- (United States) James Blake

Doubles
- (United States) Tennys Sandgren / (United States) Rhyne Williams
← 2011 ·	Natomas Men's Professional Tennis Tournament	· 2013 →

The 2012 Natomas Men's Professional Tennis Tournament was a professional tennis tournament played on hard courts. It was the eighth edition of the tournament which was part of the 2012 ATP Challenger Tour. It took place in Sacramento, United States between 1 and 7 October 2012.

== Singles main-draw entrants ==
=== Seeds ===
Country	Player	Rank^{1}	Seed
GER	Benjamin Becker	84	1
USA	James Blake	99	2
USA	Ryan Sweeting	135	3
USA	Wayne Odesnik	136	4
ITA	Matteo Viola	148	5
CAN	Peter Polansky	149	6
USA	Tim Smyczek	154	7
USA	Denis Kudla	158	8

- ^{1} Rankings are as of September 24, 2012.

=== Other entrants ===
The following players received wildcards into the singles main draw:

- (United States) James Blake
- (United States) Bradley Klahn
- (United States) Daniel Kosakowski
- (Denmark) Frederik Nielsen

The following players received entry from the qualifying draw:

- (Japan) Taro Daniel
- (Slovenia) Luka Gregorc
- (Australia) Greg Jones
- (United States) Phillip Simmonds

== Champions ==
=== Singles ===
- (United States) James Blake def. (Germany) Mischa Zverev, 6–1, 1–6, 6–4

=== Doubles ===
- (United States) Tennys Sandgren / (United States) Rhyne Williams def. (United States) Devin Britton / (United States) Austin Krajicek, 4–6, 6–4, [12–10]
