= 2011 Natomas Men's Professional Tennis Tournament =

- Date: 3–9 October
- Edition: 7th
- Surface: Hard
- Location: Sacramento, United States

Champions

Singles
- (Croatia) Ivo Karlović

Doubles
- (Australia) Carsten Ball / (Australia) Chris Guccione
| ← 2010 · | Natomas Men's Professional Tennis Tournament | · 2012 → |

The 2011 Natomas Men's Professional Tennis Tournament was a professional tennis tournament played on hard courts. It was the seventh edition of the tournament which was part of the 2011 ATP Challenger Tour. It took place in Sacramento, United States between 3 and 9 October 2011.

== Singles main-draw entrants ==
=== Seeds ===
| Country | Player | Rank^{1} | Seed |
|---|---|---|---|
| USA | James Blake | 74 | 1 |
| CRO | Ivo Karlović | 77 | 2 |
| USA | Sam Querrey | 119 | 3 |
| USA | Bobby Reynolds | 120 | 4 |
| CAN | Vasek Pospisil | 125 | 5 |
| RSA | Izak van der Merwe | 134 | 6 |
| GER | Björn Phau | 148 | 7 |
| GBR | James Ward | 155 | 8 |

- ^{1} Rankings are as of September 26, 2011.

=== Other entrants ===
The following players received wildcards into the singles main draw:

- (Chile) Fernando González
- (United States) Nicholas Monroe
- (United States) Jack Sock
- (United States) Sam Querrey

The following players received entry as a special exempt into the singles main draw:

- (Colombia) Robert Farah

The following players received entry from the qualifying draw:

- (Canada) Pierre-Ludovic Duclos
- (United States) Steve Johnson
- (United States) Blake Strode
- (New Zealand) Michael Venus

The following players received entry from a lucky loser spot:

- (United Kingdom) Jamie Baker

== Champions ==
=== Singles ===
(Croatia) Ivo Karlović def. (United States) James Blake, 6–4, 3–6, 6–4

=== Doubles ===
(Australia) Carsten Ball / (Australia) Chris Guccione def. (United States) Nicholas Monroe / (United States) Jack Sock, 7–6^{(7–3)}, 1–6, [10–5]
