= 2014 Sacramento Challenger =

- Date: 29 September – 5 October
- Edition: 10th
- Surface: Hard
- Location: Sacramento, California, United States

Champions

Singles
- (United States) Sam Querrey

Doubles
- (Australia) Adam Hubble / (Australia) John-Patrick Smith
← 2013 ·	Sacramento Challenger	· 2015 →

The 2014 Sacramento Challenger was a professional tennis tournament played on hard courts. It was the ninth edition of the tournament which was part of the 2014 ATP Challenger Tour. It took place in Sacramento, California, United States between 29 September and 5 October 2014.

== Singles main-draw entrants ==
=== Seeds ===
Country	Player	Rank^{1}	Seed
USA	Sam Querrey	54	1
USA	Tim Smyczek	99	2
USA	Bradley Klahn	115	3
USA	Michael Russell	123	4
USA	Denis Kudla	124	5
CAN	Peter Polansky	125	6
NED	Thiemo de Bakker	143	7
CAN	Frank Dancevic	144	8

- Rankings are as of September 22, 2014.

=== Other entrants ===
The following players received wildcards into the singles main draw:

- (United States) Daniel Nguyen
- (United States) Bjorn Fratangelo
- (United States) Stefan Kozlov
- (United States) Collin Altamirano

The following player received entry as a special exemption into the singles main draw:

- (United States) Jared Donaldson

The following player received entry as an alternate into the singles main draw:

- (Sweden) Elias Ymer

The following players received entry with a protected ranking into the singles main draw:

- (United States) Tennys Sandgren
- (Australia) John Millman

The following players received entry from the qualifying draw:

- (United Kingdom) Liam Broady
- (United States) Marcos Giron
- (Bulgaria) Dimitar Kutrovsky
- (United States) Eric Quigley

== Champions ==
=== Singles ===
- (United States) Sam Querrey def. (United States) Stefan Kozlov, 6–3, 6–4

=== Doubles ===
- (Australia) Adam Hubble / (Australia) John-Patrick Smith def. (Canada) Peter Polansky / (Canada) Adil Shamasdin, 6–3, 6–2
