= 2010 Natomas Men's Professional Tennis Tournament =

- Date: 4–11 October
- Edition: 6th
- Surface: Hard
- Location: Sacramento, United States

Champions

Singles
- (Australia) John Millman

Doubles
- (South Africa) Rik de Voest / (South Africa) Izak van der Merwe
← 2009 ·	Natomas Men's Professional Tennis Tournament	· 2011 →

The 2010 Natomas Men's Professional Tennis Tournament was a professional tennis tournament played on hard courts. It was the sixth edition of the tournament which was part of the 2010 ATP Challenger Tour. It took place in Sacramento, United States between 4 and 11 October 2010.

== Singles main-draw entrants ==
=== Seeds ===
Country	Player	Rank^{1}	Seed
GER	Tobias Kamke	88	1
USA	Donald Young	106	2
GER	Julian Reister	111	3
USA	Ryan Sweeting	114	4
USA	Robert Kendrick	151	5
AUS	Carsten Ball	153	6
RSA	Izak van der Merwe	155	7
USA	Kevin Kim	162	8

- Rankings are as of September 27, 2010.

=== Other entrants ===
The following players received wildcards into the singles main draw:

- (United States) Denis Kudla
- (United States) Michael McClune
- (United States) Dennis Novikov
- (South Africa) Fritz Wolmarans

The following players received entry from the qualifying draw:

- (United Kingdom) Daniel Cox
- (Canada) Pierre-Ludovic Duclos
- (Slovenia) Luka Gregorc
- (Bulgaria) Dimitar Kutrovsky
- (South Africa) Andrew Anderson (Lucky loser replacing Jesse Levine)

== Champions ==
=== Singles ===
(Australia) John Millman def. (United States) Robert Kendrick, 6–3, 6–2

=== Doubles ===
(South Africa) Rik de Voest / (South Africa) Izak van der Merwe def. (United States) Nicholas Monroe / (United States) Donald Young, 4–6, 6–4, [10–7]
