= 2010 Natomas Men's Professional Tennis Tournament – Doubles =

Doubles
- 2010 Natomas Men's Professional Tennis Tournament

Final
- Champions: (South Africa) Rik de Voest (South Africa) Izak van der Merwe
- Runners-up: (United States) Nicholas Monroe (United States) Donald Young
- Score: 4–6, 6–4, [10–7]

Events
Singles	Doubles
← 2009 ·	Natomas Men's Professional Tennis Tournament	· 2011 →

Lester Cook and David Martin were the defending champions, but chose to not compete this year.
Rik de Voest and Izak van der Merwe won in the final 4–6, 6–4, [10–7], against Nicholas Monroe and Donald Young.

== Seeds ==
1. (Australia) ~~Carsten Ball~~ / (Australia) ~~Chris Guccione~~ (withdrew due to Ball's quad strain injury)
2. (South Africa) Rik de Voest / (South Africa) Izak van der Merwe (champions)
3. (United States) Ryler DeHeart / (Canada) Pierre-Ludovic Duclos (quarterfinals)
4. (United States) Alex Kuznetsov / (United States) Travis Rettenmaier (first round)

== Draw ==
=== Key ===
- Q = Qualifier
- WC = Wild card
- LL = Lucky loser
- Alt = Alternate
- SE = Special exempt
- PR = Protected ranking
- ITF = ITF entry
- JE = Junior exempt
- w/o = Walkover
- r = Retired
- d = Defaulted
- SR = Special ranking

=== Draw ===
First round
LL	(Bulgaria) Boris Nicola Bakalov (United States) R Borvanov	6^{3}	6	[10]
(Germany) T Kamke (Germany) J Reister	7	2	[1]
(United States) N Monroe (United States) D Young	6	6
(New Zealand) D King-Turner (Denmark) F Nielsen	1	4
3	(United States) R DeHeart (Canada) P-L Duclos	3	7	[10]
(United States) T Smyczek (United States) M Yani	6	6^{2}	[5]
(United States) L Cook (Bosnia and Herzegovina) A Delić	4	6	[12]
Q	(South Africa) A Anderson (United Kingdom) C Eaton	6	3	[10]
WC	(United States) A Bogomolov Jr. (United States) J Witten	6	6
(United States) K Kim (Australia) M Matosevic	2	2
WC	(United States) Brett Joelson (United States) R Kendrick	6	6
4	(United States) A Kuznetsov (United States) T Rettenmaier	3	4
WC	(United States) Nicholas Brunner (Egypt) Zahir Sharif	1	4
(United States) J Levine (United States) R Sweeting	6	6
(United States) Ashwin Kumar (Russia) A Sitak	2	3
2	(South Africa) R de Voest (South Africa) I van der Merwe	6	6

Quarterfinals
LL	(Bulgaria) B N Bakalov (United States) R Borvanov	4	2
(United States) N Monroe (United States) D Young	6	6
3	(United States) R DeHeart (Canada) P-L Duclos	3	3
(United States) L Cook (Bosnia and Herzegovina) A Delić	6	6
WC	(United States) A Bogomolov Jr. (United States) J Witten	1	1
WC	(United States) B Joelson (United States) R Kendrick	6	6
(United States) J Levine (United States) R Sweeting	w/o
2	(South Africa) R de Voest (South Africa) I van der Merwe

Semifinals
(United States) N Monroe (United States) D Young	6	2	[10]
(United States) L Cook (Bosnia and Herzegovina) A Delić	4	6	[6]
WC	(United States) B Joelson (United States) R Kendrick	6^{5}	3
2	(South Africa) R de Voest (South Africa) I van der Merwe	7	6

Finals
(United States) N Monroe (United States) D Young	6	4	[7]
2	(South Africa) R de Voest (South Africa) I van der Merwe	4	6	[10]
