= 2009 Natomas Men's Professional Tennis Tournament – Doubles =

Doubles
- 2009 Natomas Men's Professional Tennis Tournament

Final
- Champions: (United States) Lester Cook (United States) David Martin
- Runners-up: (Mexico) Santiago González (United States) Travis Rettenmaier
- Score: 4–6, 6–3, [10–5]

Events
Singles	Doubles
← 2008 ·	Natomas Men's Professional Tennis Tournament	· 2010 →

Brian and Dann Battistone were the defending champions, but did not compete this year.
Lester Cook and David Martin defeated Santiago González and Travis Rettenmaier 4–6, 6–3, [10–5] in the final.

== Seeds ==
1. (Mexico) Santiago González / (United States) Travis Rettenmaier (final)
2. (United States) Jesse Levine / (United States) Ryan Sweeting (semifinals, withdrew due to Sweeting's ankle injury)
3. (Serbia) Ilija Bozoljac / (Serbia) Dušan Vemić (first round)
4. (Philippines) Treat Conrad Huey / (India) Harsh Mankad (quarterfinals)

== Draw ==
=== Key ===
- Q = Qualifier
- WC = Wild card
- LL = Lucky loser
- Alt = Alternate
- SE = Special exempt
- PR = Protected ranking
- ITF = ITF entry
- JE = Junior exempt
- w/o = Walkover
- r = Retired
- d = Defaulted
- SR = Special ranking

=== Draw ===
First round
1	(Mexico) S González (United States) T Rettenmaier	6	6
Q	(South Africa) R Klaasen (South Africa) I van der Merwe	3	3
(Uruguay) M Felder (Colombia) A González	7	6
WC	(United States) W Gray (United States) Rylan Rizza	6^{5}	2
4	(Philippines) TC Huey (India) H Mankad	6	6
(United States) S Jenkins (Australia) N Lindahl	4	4
(Italy) R Ghedin (Switzerland) M Lammer	3	6^{4}
(United States) A Kuznetsov (United States) T Widom	6	7
(Croatia) R Karanušić (Slovenia) G Žemlja	6	2	[8]
(India) P Amritraj (United States) K Kim	4	6	[10]
(United States) L Cook (United States) D Martin	6	6
3	(Serbia) I Bozoljac (Serbia) D Vemić	3	3
LL	(Bulgaria) Boris Nicola Balakov (Germany) Cedrik-Marcel Stebe	1	4
WC	(United States) J-M Gambill (United States) V Spadea	6	6
LL	(Canada) M Raonic (Australia) M Reid	3	6	[6]
2	(United States) J Levine (United States) R Sweeting	6	4	[10]

Quarterfinals
1	(Mexico) S González (United States) T Rettenmaier	6	7
(Uruguay) M Felder (Colombia) A González	2	6^{3}
4	(Philippines) TC Huey (India) H Mankad	6^{3}	5
(United States) A Kuznetsov (United States) T Widom	7	7
(India) P Amritraj (United States) K Kim	3	3
(United States) L Cook (United States) D Martin	6	6
WC	(United States) J-M Gambill (United States) V Spadea	6^{2}	6^{6}
2	(United States) J Levine (United States) R Sweeting	7	7

Semifinals
1	(Mexico) S González (United States) T Rettenmaier	7	4	[10]
(United States) A Kuznetsov (United States) T Widom	6^{0}	6	[7]
(United States) L Cook (United States) D Martin
2	(United States) J Levine (United States) R Sweeting	w/o

Finals
1	(Mexico) S González (United States) T Rettenmaier	6	3	[5]
(United States) L Cook (United States) D Martin	4	6	[10]
