= 2009 Natomas Men's Professional Tennis Tournament =

- Date: 5–11 October
- Edition: 5th
- Surface: Hard
- Location: Sacramento, California, United States

Champions

Singles
- (Colombia) Santiago Giraldo

Doubles
- (United States) Lester Cook / (United States) David Martin
← 2008 ·	Natomas Men's Professional Tennis Tournament	· 2010 →

The 2009 Natomas Men's Professional Tennis Tournament was a professional tennis tournament played on outdoor hard courts. It was the fifth edition of the tournament which was part of the 2009 ATP Challenger Tour. It took place in Sacramento, California, United States between 5 and 11 October 2009.

== Singles main-draw entrants ==
=== Seeds ===
Country	Player	Rank^{1}	Seed
USA	Robert Kendrick	83	1
USA	Wayne Odesnik	87	2
USA	Kevin Kim	105	3
USA	Jesse Levine	109	4
CRO	Roko Karanušić	122	5
COL	Santiago Giraldo	123	6
USA	Ryan Sweeting	147	7
SLO	Grega Žemlja	157	8

- Rankings are as of September 28, 2009.

=== Other entrants ===
The following players received wildcards into the singles main draw:

- (United States) Alexander Domijan
- (United Kingdom) Daniel Evans
- (United States) Jan-Michael Gambill
- (United States) Ryan Harrison

The following player received a Special Exempt into the singles main draw:

- (Germany) Andre Begemann

The following players received entry from the qualifying draw:

- (Philippines) Treat Conrad Huey
- (South Africa) Raven Klaasen (as a Lucky loser)
- (Philippines) Cecil Mamiit
- (Republic of Ireland) Louk Sorensen
- (South Africa) Izak van der Merwe

== Champions ==
=== Singles ===
(Colombia) Santiago Giraldo def. (United States) Jesse Levine, 7–6(4), 6–1

=== Doubles ===
(United States) Lester Cook / (United States) David Martin def. (Mexico) Santiago González / (United States) Travis Rettenmaier, 4–6, 6–3, [10–5]
