= 2014 Sacramento Challenger – Doubles =

Doubles
- 2014 Sacramento Challenger

Final
- Champions: (Australia) Adam Hubble (Australia) John-Patrick Smith
- Runners-up: (Canada) Peter Polansky (Canada) Adil Shamasdin
- Score: 6–3, 6–2

Events
Singles	Doubles
- Sacramento Challenger

John-Patrick Smith and Matt Reid were the defending champions, however they chose not to participate with each other. Smith partners Adam Hubble, whilst Reid partners Jose Statham.

Adam Hubble and John-Patrick Smith won the title by defeating Peter Polansky and Adil Shamasdin 6–3, 6–2 in the final.

== Seeds ==
1. (New Zealand) Marcus Daniell / (New Zealand) Artem Sitak (semifinals)
2. (Canada) Peter Polansky / (Canada) Adil Shamasdin (final)
3. (United States) Bradley Klahn / (United States) Tim Smyczek (withdrew)
4. (United States) Sekou Bangoura / (United States) Tennys Sandgren (first round)

== Draw ==
Key

- Q = Qualifier
- WC = Wild card
- LL = Lucky loser
- Alt = Alternate
- ITF = ITF entry
- PR = Protected ranking
- SR = Special ranking
- SE = Special exempt
- JE = Junior exempt
- JR = Junior Accelerator Programme entrant
- CO = College Accelerator Programme entrant
- NG = Next Gen Accelerator Program entrant
- w/o = Walkover
- r = Retired
- d = Defaulted

First round
1	(New Zealand) M Daniell (New Zealand) A Sitak	6	7^{7}
WC	(South Africa) R de Voest (United States) M Seeberger	1	6^{4}
Q	(United Kingdom) L Broady (Australia) J Thompson	3	3
(Australia) A Bolt (Canada) F Dancevic	6	6
PR/4	(United States) S Bangoura (United States) T Sandgren	1	4
PR	(Australia) A Hubble (Australia) J-P Smith	6	6
(Italy) T Fabbiano (Italy) L Vanni	3	4
(Netherlands) T de Bakker (Netherlands) W Koolhof	6	6
(United States) A Kuznetsov (United States) V Mirzadeh	5	6	[10]
WC	(United States) A Halebian (United States) D Novikov	7	4	[2]
WC	(United States) D Nguyen (United States) E Quigley	7	6
LL	(Austria) S Bader (United States) Erik Elliott	5	4
(Republic of Ireland) J Cluskey (Republic of Ireland) J McGee	6	4	[8]
PR	(Australia) M Reid (New Zealand) J Statham	3	6	[10]
(United States) D Kudla (United States) R Williams	6^{6}	0
2	(Canada) P Polansky (Canada) A Shamasdin	7^{7}	6

Quarterfinals
1	(New Zealand) M Daniell (New Zealand) A Sitak	2	7^{8}	[10]
(Australia) A Bolt (Canada) F Dancevic	6	6^{6}	[4]
PR	(Australia) A Hubble (Australia) J-P Smith	6	6^{6}	[10]
(Netherlands) T de Bakker (Netherlands) W Koolhof	4	7^{8}	[8]
(United States) A Kuznetsov (United States) V Mirzadeh	6	4	[7]
WC	(United States) D Nguyen (United States) E Quigley	4	6	[10]
(Australia) M Reid (New Zealand) J Statham	2	4
2	(Canada) P Polansky (Canada) A Shamasdin	6	6

Semifinals
1	(New Zealand) M Daniell (New Zealand) A Sitak	4	7^{7}	[14]
PR	(Australia) A Hubble (Australia) J-P Smith	6	6^{5}	[16]
WC	(United States) D Nguyen (United States) E Quigley	4	2
2	(Canada) P Polansky (Canada) A Shamasdin	6	6

Final
PR	(Australia) A Hubble (Australia) J-P Smith	6	6
2	(Canada) P Polansky (Canada) A Shamasdin	3	2
