= 2013 Sacramento Challenger – Singles =

Singles
- 2013 Sacramento Challenger

Final
- Champion: (United States) Donald Young
- Runner-up: (United States) Tim Smyczek
- Score: 7–5, 6–3

Events
Singles	Doubles
- Sacramento Challenger

James Blake was the defending champion but retired from tennis.

== Seeds ==
1. (United States) Denis Kudla (first round)
2. (United States) Tim Smyczek (final)
3. (Australia) Matthew Ebden (quarterfinals)
4. (United States) Rajeev Ram (first round)
5. (United States) Rhyne Williams (first round)
6. (United States) Alex Kuznetsov (first round)
7. (United States) Bradley Klahn (quarterfinals)
8. (United States) Donald Young (champion)

== Draw ==
Key

- Q = Qualifier
- WC = Wild card
- LL = Lucky loser
- Alt = Alternate
- ITF = ITF entry
- PR = Protected ranking
- SR = Special ranking
- SE = Special exempt
- JE = Junior exempt
- JR = Junior Accelerator Programme entrant
- CO = College Accelerator Programme entrant
- NG = Next Gen Accelerator Program entrant
- w/o = Walkover
- r = Retired
- d = Defaulted

=== Finals ===
Semifinals
8	(United States) Donald Young	6	6
WC	(United States) Jarmere Jenkins	2	2
(Australia) Nick Kyrgios	3	1
2	(United States) Tim Smyczek	6	6

Final
8	(United States) Donald Young	7	6
2	(United States) Tim Smyczek	5	3

=== Top half ===
First round
1	(United States) D Kudla	5	0
Alt	(United Kingdom) D Cox	7	6
(United States) S Johnson	4	6^{4}
(Australia) M Reid	6	7^{7}
(Republic of Ireland) J McGee	7	3	6
WC	(United States) C Altamirano	5	6	3
(Germany) P Gojowczyk	4	6^{6}
8	(United States) D Young	6	7^{8}
3	(Australia) M Ebden	7	6
(United States) A Krajicek	5	3
(United States) R Ginepri	7	6
(United States) T Sandgren	5	4
(Australia) J-P Smith	3	1
WC	(United States) J Jenkins	6	6
(United Kingdom) D Evans	6	7^{7}
5	(United States) R Williams	3	6^{2}

Second round
Alt	(United Kingdom) D Cox	4	3
(Australia) M Reid	6	6
(Republic of Ireland) J McGee	2	3
8	(United States) D Young	6	6
3	(Australia) M Ebden	6	3	6
(United States) R Ginepri	0	6	4
WC	(United States) J Jenkins	3	6	6
(United Kingdom) D Evans	6	3	3

Quarterfinals
(Australia) M Reid	3	4
8	(United States) D Young	6	6
3	(Australia) M Ebden	7	3	4
WC	(United States) J Jenkins	6^{3}	6	6

Semifinals
8	(United States) D Young	6	6
WC	(United States) J Jenkins	2	2

=== Bottom half ===
First round
7	(United States) B Klahn	7	4	6
Q	(Bulgaria) D Kutrovsky	5	6	4
(Australia) B Mitchell	7	6
Q	(South Africa) F Wolmarans	5	3
WC	(United States) R Kendrick	6^{5}	3
Q	(Australia) T Kokkinakis	7^{7}	6
(Australia) N Kyrgios	7^{7}	7^{7}
4	(United States) R Ram	6^{4}	6^{2}
6	(United States) A Kuznetsov	6	3	6^{2}
(Canada) P Polansky	3	6	7^{7}
(Ukraine) D Molchanov	3	2
(Australia) S Groth	6	6
Q	(United States) Dennis Nevolo	6^{4}	4
(United States) B Reynolds	7^{7}	7
WC	(United States) Robert Noah	6^{3}	0
2	(United States) T Smyczek	7^{7}	6

Second round
7	(United States) B Klahn	7^{8}	6
(Australia) B Mitchell	6^{6}	4
Q	(Australia) T Kokkinakis	6	6^{6}	1
(Australia) N Kyrgios	2	7^{8}	6
(Canada) P Polansky	7^{8}	6^{7}	3
(Australia) S Groth	6^{6}	7^{9}	6
(United States) B Reynolds	2	4
2	(United States) T Smyczek	6	6

Quarterfinals
7	(United States) B Klahn	6^{5}	6	6^{4}
(Australia) N Kyrgios	7^{7}	2	7^{7}
(Australia) S Groth	6^{8}	6	1
2	(United States) T Smyczek	7^{10}	4	6

Semifinals
(Australia) N Kyrgios	3	1
2	(United States) T Smyczek	6	6
