= 2009 Natomas Men's Professional Tennis Tournament – Singles =

Singles
- 2009 Natomas Men's Professional Tennis Tournament

Final
- Champion: (Colombia) Santiago Giraldo
- Runner-up: (United States) Jesse Levine
- Score: 7–6(4), 6–1

Events
Singles	Doubles
- Natomas Men's Professional Tennis Tournament

Donald Young chose to not defend his 2008 title.
Santiago Giraldo won this tournament. He won against Jesse Levine 7–6(4), 6–1 in the final.

== Seeds ==
1. (United States) Robert Kendrick (quarterfinals)
2. (United States) Wayne Odesnik (first round)
3. (United States) Kevin Kim (second round)
4. (United States) Jesse Levine (final)
5. (Croatia) Roko Karanušić (first round)
6. (Colombia) Santiago Giraldo (champion)
7. (United States) Ryan Sweeting (first round)
8. (Slovenia) Grega Žemlja (first round)

== Draw ==
Key

- Q = Qualifier
- WC = Wild card
- LL = Lucky loser
- Alt = Alternate
- ITF = ITF entry
- PR = Protected ranking
- SR = Special ranking
- SE = Special exempt
- JE = Junior exempt
- JR = Junior Accelerator Programme entrant
- CO = College Accelerator Programme entrant
- NG = Next Gen Accelerator Program entrant
- w/o = Walkover
- r = Retired
- d = Defaulted

=== Final four ===
Semifinals
(United States) Jesse Witten	1	4
6	(Colombia) Santiago Giraldo	6	6
4	(United States) Jesse Levine	6	6
WC	(United States) Ryan Harrison	4	3

Final
6	(Colombia) Santiago Giraldo	7	6
4	(United States) Jesse Levine	6^{4}	1

=== Top half ===
First round
1	(United States) R Kendrick	7	4	6
Q	(South Africa) I van der Merwe	6^{5}	6	1
(Uruguay) M Felder	3	2
(United States) L Cook	6	6
(United States) J Witten	6	6
LL	(South Africa) R Klaasen	3	3
WC	(United States) J-M Gambill	4	6	6
7	(United States) R Sweeting	6	4	4
3	(United States) K Kim	6	6
WC	(United States) Alexander Domijan	4	2
Q	(Philippines) TC Huey	3	6	6
(United States) T Widom	6	0	3
(United States) V Spadea	6	7
(United States) A Kuznetsov	3	6^{5}
(Serbia) I Bozoljac	7	4	1
6	(Colombia) S Giraldo	5	6	6

Second round
1	(United States) R Kendrick	6^{7}	6	7
(United States) L Cook	7	4	6^{6}
(United States) J Witten	7	7
WC	(United States) J-M Gambill	6^{6}	5
3	(United States) K Kim	2	6^{5}
Q	(Philippines) TC Huey	6	7
(United States) V Spadea	1	6^{7}
6	(Colombia) S Giraldo	6	7

Quarterfinals
1	(United States) R Kendrick	7	4	3
(United States) J Witten	6^{4}	6	6
Q	(Philippines) TC Huey	1	7	4
6	(Colombia) S Giraldo	6	6^{6}	6

Semifinals
(United States) J Witten	1	4
6	(Colombia) S Giraldo	6	6

=== Bottom half ===
First round
5	(Croatia) R Karanušić	6^{3}	2
(United States) S Jenkins	7	6
Q	(Republic of Ireland) L Sorensen	6	6
(Mexico) S González	1	3
SE	(Germany) A Begemann	5	6	5
(Germany) S Stadler	7	3	7
(India) P Amritraj	6	3	5
4	(United States) J Levine	1	6	7
8	(Slovenia) G Žemlja	4	6	5
WC	(United States) R Harrison	6	1	7
(Ecuador) G Lapentti	2	3
(Switzerland) M Lammer	6	6
(Australia) N Lindahl	6	6
Q	(Philippines) C Mamiit	3	1
WC	(United Kingdom) D Evans	6	6
2	(United States) W Odesnik	2	4

Second round
(United States) S Jenkins	6	5	6
Q	(Republic of Ireland) L Sorensen	3	7	3
(Germany) S Stadler	2	4
4	(United States) J Levine	6	6
WC	(United States) R Harrison	2	6	6
(Switzerland) M Lammer	6	3	3
(Australia) N Lindahl	6	6
WC	(United Kingdom) D Evans	3	3

Quarterfinals
(United States) S Jenkins	1	1
4	(United States) J Levine	6	6
WC	(United States) R Harrison	6	3	7
(Australia) N Lindahl	3	6	6^{5}

Semifinals
4	(United States) J Levine	6	6
WC	(United States) R Harrison	4	3
