= Nicholas Monroe =

American tennis player (born 1982)

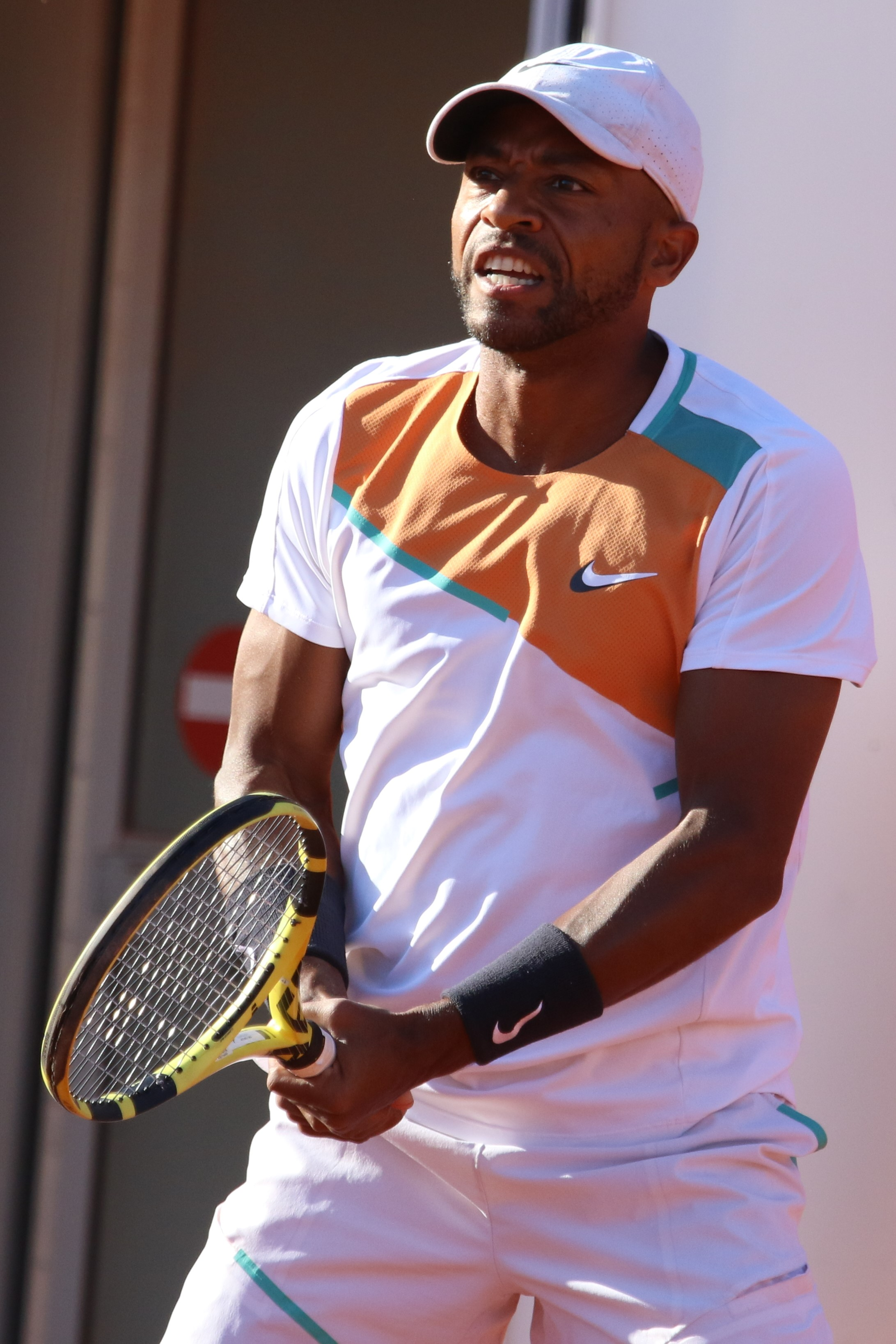
- Monroe at the 2022 BNP Paribas Primrose Bordeaux
- Country (sports): United States
- Residence: Austin, Texas, U.S.
- Born: April 12, 1982 (age 44) Oklahoma City, Oklahoma, U.S.
- Height: 1.78 m (5 ft 10 in)
- Turned pro: 2004
- Retired: 2022
- Plays: Right-handed (two-handed backhand)
- College: University of North Carolina at Chapel Hill
- Prize money: US$1,498,916

Singles
- Career record: 0–0
- Career titles: 0
- Highest ranking: No. 253 (19 September 2011)

Grand Slam singles results
- Australian Open: Q2 (2007)
- Wimbledon: Q1 (2008)
- US Open: Q1 (2008, 2011)

Doubles
- Career record: 154–214
- Career titles: 4 ATP, 13 Challengers
- Highest ranking: No. 30 (2 October 2017)

Grand Slam doubles results
- Australian Open: 3R (2021)
- French Open: QF (2020)
- Wimbledon: 3R (2017)
- US Open: QF (2017)

Grand Slam mixed doubles results
- Australian Open: 1R (2018)
- French Open: 1R (2014)
- Wimbledon: 3R (2016)
- US Open: 2R (2017)
Medal record
Representing United States
Pan American Games
Bronze medal – third place	2011 Guadalajara	Doubles
- Last updated on: 6 February 2023.

Benjamin Nicholas Monroe (born April 12, 1982) is an American former professional tennis player. Monroe was a doubles specialist. He reached a career-high ATP doubles ranking of No. 30 on 2 October 2017 and won four ATP Tour doubles titles and thirteen ATP Challenger Tour titles in his career.

He briefly coached American player Jack Sock in the off-season in 2022 and in 2023.

== College career ==
Monroe had a highly successful college career at the University of North Carolina at Chapel Hill from 2000 to 2004. His achievements include:

- University of North Carolina's Senior Male Student-Athlete of the Year (2003–2004)
- All-American Status (2003–2004)
- All-ACC Status (2002–2004)
- 2nd in all-time singles wins (100) at the University of North Carolina at Chapel Hill
- Recipient of the Arthur Ashe Regional Sportsmanship Award (2003–2004)
- National and Regional NCAA/ITF John Van Nostrand Sportsmanship Awards (2003–2004)

== Professional career ==
=== 2001 ===
Nicholas competed in doubles in his first main-draw Futures match. He and partner (compatriot) Tripp Phillips lost in the first round of USA F21. This was the only tour event he competed in during 2001.

=== 2002 ===
Monroe reached the quarterfinals of his first Futures tournament in singles play, USA F11, played in Peoria, Illinois in July.

=== 2003 ===
Nicholas won his first Futures doubles match, partnering Yannis Vlachos to the semifinals of Slovenia F1.

=== 2004: Turned Pro ===
After playing only four Futures events in 2003, Monroe played, from June, a full schedule in 2004. In his first doubles tournament of the year, he reached his first final, partnering Jonathan Igbinovia. In August he reached his first singles semifinal, at Indonesia F2 in Makassar. In October, Monroe captured his first Futures title, in doubles, partnering Márcio Torres at Venezuela F3. He won a second two weeks later, Mexico F17, playing alongside Jeremy Wurtzman. Later in November, Monroe played in his first Challenger tournament, the Puebla Challenger in Puebla, Mexico, losing in the first round to Santiago González. In doubles, he and Wurtzman reached the semifinals. Three weeks later in Guadalajara, however, he won two Challenger matches to reach the quarterfinals.

=== 2005 ===
His first full year as a professional, Nicholas played ITF Circuit and USTA Pro Circuit events. He reached his first final and won his first singles title at the ITF Circuit event in South Africa, when he defeated Stephen Mitchell. Highly successful in doubles, Nick won four titles in 2005: with Jeremy Wurtzman at the USTA Pro Circuit event in Orange Park, Florida; with Izak van der Merwe at ITF Circuit events in Botswana and Zimbabwe; and with Sam Warburg at the ITF Circuit event in Israel.

Monroe competed in 29 events in 2005, all but one of which were Futures. He lost in the first round of his only main draw Challenger event singles match, to Zack Fleishman at the Cuenca Challenger. Monroe won his first singles title, South Africa F1 in late October, defeating Stephen Mitchell in the final.

=== 2006 ===
Nicholas started the year by winning the ITF Circuit title in Costa Rica. A month later, he won another ITF title, this time in Nigeria. He reached the semifinals of a USTA Pro Circuit event in Little Rock, before reaching back-to-back finals in India. He lost to Karan Rastogi in Delhi and defeated Sunil-Kumar Sipaeya in Dehradun. He reached another ITF Circuit final in the fall in Japan, where he lost to Satoshi Iwabuchi. At the beginning of the year, Nick won consecutive doubles titles on the ITF Circuit with partner Sam Warburg in Mexico and Costa Rica.

=== 2007 ===
Nicholas began the year by attempting to qualify for the 2007 Australian Open. He defeated Jeremy Chardy in his first round singles qualifying match. He reached consecutive ITF Futures events in Japan, where he lost to Gouichi Motomura both times. He won two titles at ITF Futures events in Mexico and won a USTA Pro Circuit event in Rochester, New York, where he defeated Robert Yim in the final. The fall of 2007 saw Monroe reach the semifinals of USTA Pro Circuit events in Manchester, Texas, where he lost to eventual champion Michael McClune, and Waikoloa, Hawaii where he lost to Lester Cook. He partnered with Izak van der Merwe to win the USTA Pro Circuit doubles title in Brownsville, Texas.

=== 2012: Challenger circuit doubles success ===
Nicholas won the Challenger in Medellin, Colombia (doubles) with his partner Maciek Sykut.

He also won two doubles Challengers in Mexico with German partner Simon Stadler.

=== 2013–2015: First Three ATP doubles titles ===
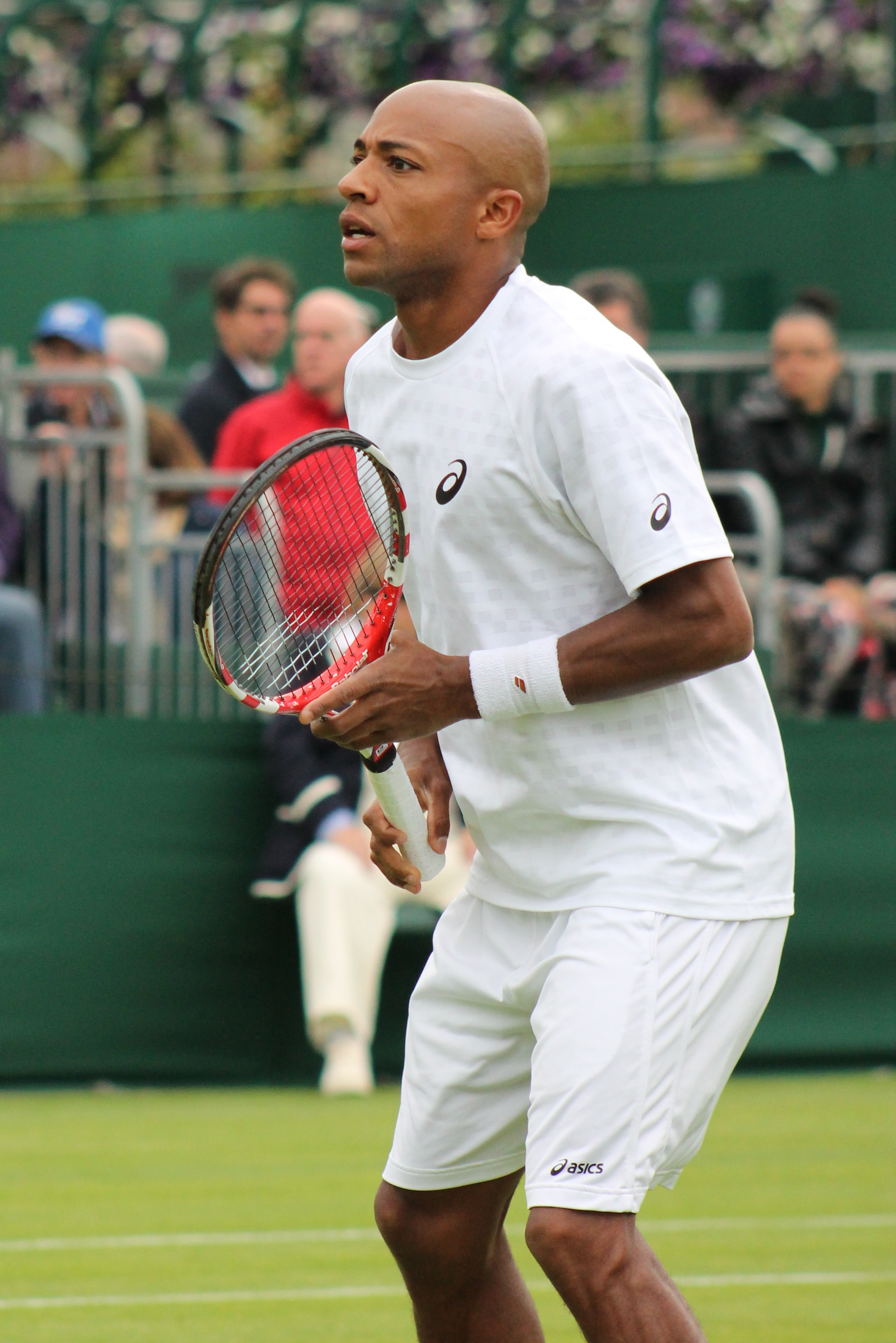
Monroe at the 2013 Wimbledon Championships

Nicholas had his best year as a professional in 2013, finishing the year with a doubles ranking of World No. 53. In January 2013, Monroe and partner Raven Klaasen made it to the semifinals of the 2013 Aircel Chennai Open, falling to Benoît Paire and Stanislas Wawrinka, after a surprise quarterfinal win over the #1 seeds Mahesh Bhupathi and Daniel Nestor. He then teamed up successfully with Simon Stadler to play the Copa Claro in Buenos Aires, Argentina. They made it to the final, falling to the Italian pair of Fabio Fognini and Simone Bolelli. In July 2013, he won his first ATP title in doubles also with Stadler at the 250 level at the 2013 Bastad Skistar Swedish Open, and reached the final of the 2013 Umag Open in Croatia, also on clay.

=== 2017–18: Continued doubles success: First Masters final & US Open quarterfinal, top 30 debut ===
Following three semi-final finishes in Chennai, Auckland and Quito all with Artem Sitak, Monroe reached a top 40 doubles ranking of No. 39 on 3 April 2017 after the biggest run of his career to the final of the 2017 Miami Open with Jack Sock. He later peaked at a career-high of No. 30 on 2 October 2017 after reaching his ninth final at the 2017 ATP Shenzhen Open partnering Nikola Mektic.

Partnering Artem Sitak he reached the third round at the 2017 Wimbledon Championships for their first time at this major and in his career. With John-Patrick Smith at the 2017 US Open, he reached the quarterfinals at a Grand Slam also for the first time in his career.

The pair also won the title at the 2018 Atlanta Open, and in February 2018 reached the final at the 2018 Delray Beach Open, Monroe's tenth.

=== 2019–2021: Thirteenth final, Second Major quarterfinal at the French Open ===
Monroe reached the final of the 2019 Winston-Salem Open, partnering compatriot Tennys Sandgren.

Partnering fellow American Tommy Paul, he also reached the second doubles Grand Slam quarterfinal of his career at the 2020 French Open.

He reached the third round at the 2021 Australian Open for the first time at this major, partnering compatriot Frances Tiafoe.

=== 2022: Retirement ===
He entered the main draw at the 2022 Wimbledon Championships as an alternate pair, again with Tommy Paul. He played his last match on the ATP tour at the 2022 US Open with Keegan Smith as a wildcard pair, where they lost to Fabio Fognini and Simone Bolelli in the second round.

== World TeamTennis ==
Nicholas played three seasons with World TeamTennis starting in 2006 when he debuted in the league with the Springfield Lasers, followed by a season with the Kansas City Explorers in 2012 and the Washington Kastles in 2019. It was announced that he will re-joining the Washington Kastles during the 2020 WTT season set to begin July 12 at The Greenbrier.

== Significant finals ==
=== ATP Masters 1000 finals ===
==== Doubles: 1 (1 runner-up) ====
Result	Year	Tournament	Surface	Partner	Opponents	Score
Loss	2017	Miami Open	Hard	(United States) Jack Sock	(Poland) Łukasz Kubot (Brazil) Marcelo Melo	5–7, 3–6

== ATP career finals ==
=== Doubles: 13 (4 titles, 9 runner-ups) ===
Legend Grand Slam tournaments (0–0) ATP World Tour Finals (0–0) ATP World Tour Masters 1000 (0–1) ATP World Tour 500 Series (0–0) ATP World Tour 250 Series (4–8)	Finals by surface Hard (2–4) Clay (2–4) Grass (0–1)	Finals by setting Outdoor (3–9) Indoor (1–0)

Result	W–L	Date	Tournament	Tier	Surface	Partner	Opponents	Score
Loss	0–1	Feb 2013	Argentina Open, Argentina	250 Series	Clay	(Germany) Simon Stadler	(Italy) Simone Bolelli (Italy) Fabio Fognini	3–6, 2–6
Win	1–1	Jul 2013	Swedish Open, Sweden	250 Series	Clay	(Germany) Simon Stadler	(Argentina) Carlos Berlocq (Spain) Albert Ramos Viñolas	6–2, 3–6, [10–3]
Loss	1–2	Jul 2013	Croatia Open, Croatia	250 Series	Clay	(Germany) Simon Stadler	(Slovakia) Martin Kližan (Spain) David Marrero	1–6, 7–5, [7–10]
Win	2–2	Jul 2014	Swedish Open, Sweden (2)	250 Series	Clay	(Sweden) Johan Brunström	(France) Jérémy Chardy (Austria) Oliver Marach	4–6, 7–6^{(7–5)}, [10–7]
Loss	2–3	Apr 2015	Romanian Open, Romania	250 Series	Clay	(New Zealand) Artem Sitak	(Romania) Marius Copil (Romania) Adrian Ungur	6–3, 5–7, [15–17]
Loss	2–4	Jul 2015	Hall of Fame Open, United States	250 Series	Grass	(Croatia) Mate Pavić	(United Kingdom) Jonathan Marray (Pakistan) Aisam-ul-Haq Qureshi	6–4, 3–6, [8–10]
Win	3–4	Oct 2015	Stockholm Open, Sweden	250 Series	Hard (i)	(United States) Jack Sock	(Croatia) Mate Pavić (New Zealand) Michael Venus	7–5, 6–2
Loss	3–5	Apr 2017	Miami Open, United States	Masters 1000	Hard	(United States) Jack Sock	(Poland) Łukasz Kubot (Brazil) Marcelo Melo	5–7, 3–6
Loss	3–6	Oct 2017	Shenzhen Open, China	250 Series	Hard	(Croatia) Nikola Mektić	(Austria) Alexander Peya (United States) Rajeev Ram	3–6, 2–6
Loss	3–7	Feb 2018	Delray Beach Open, United States	250 Series	Hard	(Australia) John-Patrick Smith	(United States) Jack Sock (United States) Jackson Withrow	6–4, 4–6, [8–10]
Loss	3–8	May 2018	Istanbul Open, Turkey	250 Series	Clay	(Japan) Ben McLachlan	(United Kingdom) Dominic Inglot (Sweden) Robert Lindstedt	6–3, 3–6, [8–10]
Win	4–8	Jul 2018	Atlanta Open, United States	250 Series	Hard	(Australia) John-Patrick Smith	(United States) Ryan Harrison (United States) Rajeev Ram	3–6, 7–6^{(7–5)}, [10–8]
Loss	4–9	Aug 2019	Winston-Salem Open, United States	250 Series	Hard	(United States) Tennys Sandgren	(Poland) Łukasz Kubot (Brazil) Marcelo Melo	7–6^{(8–6)}, 1–6, [3–10]

== ATP Challenger Tour finals ==
=== Doubles: 33 (13–20) ===
Result	W–L	Date	Tournament	Surface	Partner	Opponents	Score
Loss	0–1	Feb 2005	Joplin, United States	Hard (i)	(United States) Jeremy Wurtzman	(South Africa) Rik de Voest (Poland) Łukasz Kubot	6–7^{(4–7)}, 4–6
Loss	0–2	Jun 2006	Yuba City, United States	Hard	(Romania) Horia Tecău	(United States) Scott Lipsky (United States) David Martin	0–6, 4–6
Loss	0–3	Aug 2006	Manta, Ecuador	Hard	(Romania) Horia Tecău	(United States) Eric Nunez (Netherlands Antilles) Jean-Julien Rojer	3–6, 2–6
Loss	0–4	Jul 2007	Winnetka, United States	Hard	(South Africa) Izak van der Merwe	(United States) Patrick Briaud (United States) Chris Drake	6–7^{(5–7)}, 4–6
Loss	0–5	Sep 2007	Donetsk, Ukraine	Hard	(United States) Patrick Briaud	(United States) Philipp Petzschner (Germany) Simon Stadler	5–7, 6–3, [6–10]
Win	1–5	Jun 2008	Yuba City, United States	Hard	(United States) Michael Yani	(United States) Jan-Michael Gambill (United States) Scott Oudsema	6–4, 6–4
Loss	1–6	Jul 2008	Granby, Canada	Hard	(United States) Alberto Francis	(Canada) Philip Bester (Canada) Peter Polansky	6–2, 1–6, [5–10]
Loss	1–7	Sep 2008	Waco, United States	Hard	(United States) Alberto Francis	(United States) Alex Bogomolov Jr. (Serbia) Dušan Vemić	4–6, 7–5, [8–10]
Win	2–7	Nov 2008	Puebla, Mexico	Hard	(United States) Eric Nunez	(Mexico) Daniel Garza (Mexico) Santiago González	4–6, 6–3, [10–6]
Win	3–7	May 2010	Carson, United States	Hard	(United States) Brian Battistone	(Russia) Artem Sitak (Portugal) Leonardo Tavares	5–7, 6–3, [10–4]
Loss	3–8	Oct 2010	Sacramento, United States	Hard	(United States) Donald Young	(South Africa) Rik de Voest (South Africa) Izak van der Merwe	6–4, 4–6, [7–10]
Loss	3–9	Sep 2011	Bangkok, Thailand	Hard	(France) Ludovic Walter	(Canada) Pierre-Ludovic Duclos (Italy) Riccardo Ghedin	4–6, 4–6
Loss	3–10	Oct 2011	Sacramento, United States	Hard	(United States) Jack Sock	(Australia) Carsten Ball (Australia) Chris Guccione	6–7^{(3–7)}, 6–1, [5–10]
Loss	3–11	Jan 2012	Honolulu, United States	Hard	(United States) Jack Sock	(Bosnia and Herzegovina) Amer Delić (United States) Travis Rettenmaier	4–6, 6–7^{(3–7)}
Loss	3–12	Feb 2012	Dallas, United States	Hard (i)	(United States) Jack Sock	(United Kingdom) Chris Eaton (United Kingdom) Dominic Inglot	7–6^{(8–6)}, 4–6, [17–19]
Win	4–12	Apr 2012	Barranquilla, Colombia	Clay	(United States) Maciek Sykut	(Uruguay) Marcel Felder (Germany) Frank Moser	2–6, 6–3, [10–5]
Win	5–12	Apr 2012	San Luis Potosí, Mexico	Clay	(Germany) Simon Stadler	(Germany) Andre Begemann (Australia) Jordan Kerr	3–6, 7–5, [10–7]
Loss	5–13	May 2012	Tunis, Tunisia	Clay	(Germany) Simon Stadler	(Poland) Jerzy Janowicz (Estonia) Jürgen Zopp	6–7^{(1–7)}, 3–6
Win	6–13	Jul 2012	Milan, Italy	Clay	(Germany) Simon Stadler	(Kazakhstan) Andrey Golubev (Kazakhstan) Yuri Schukin	6–4, 3–6, [11–9]
Loss	6–14	Oct 2012	Belém, Brazil	Hard	(Germany) Simon Stadler	(Australia) John Peers (Australia) John-Patrick Smith	3–6, 2–6
Loss	6–15	Oct 2012	San Juan, Argentina	Hard	(Germany) Simon Stadler	(Argentina) Martín Alund (Argentina) Horacio Zeballos	6–3, 2–6, [12–14]
Win	7–15	Nov 2012	Medellín, Colombia	Clay	(Germany) Simon Stadler	(Argentina) Renzo Olivo (Argentina) Marco Trungelliti	6–4, 6–4
Loss	7–16	May 2013	Bordeaux, France	Clay	(Germany) Simon Stadler	(Germany) Christopher Kas (Austria) Oliver Marach	6–2, 4–6, [1–10]
Win	8–16	Jun 2013	Prostějov, Czech Republic	Clay	(Germany) Simon Stadler	(Poland) Mateusz Kowalczyk (Czech Republic) Lukáš Rosol	6–4, 6–4
Win	9–16	Aug 2013	San Marino, San Marino	Clay	(Germany) Simon Stadler	(Italy) Daniele Bracciali (Romania) Florin Mergea	6–2, 6–4
Loss	9–17	Oct 2013	Rennes, France	Hard (i)	(Germany) Simon Stadler	(Austria) Oliver Marach (Romania) Florin Mergea	4–6, 6–3, [7–10]
Win	10–17	Nov 2014	Geneva, Switzerland	Hard (i)	(Sweden) Johan Brunström	(Austria) Oliver Marach (Austria) Philipp Oswald	5–7, 7–5, [10–6]
Loss	10–18	May 2015	Aix-en-Provence, France	Clay	(New Zealand) Artem Sitak	(Netherlands) Robin Haase (Pakistan) Aisam-ul-Haq Qureshi	1–6, 2–6
Win	11–18	Jul 2015	Winnetka, United States	Hard	(Sweden) Johan Brunström	(United States) Sekou Bangoura (Canada) Frank Dancevic	4–6, 6–3, [10–8]
Loss	11–19	Sep 2015	Cary, United States	Hard	(United States) Austin Krajicek	(United States) Chase Buchanan (Slovenia) Blaž Rola	4–6, 7–6^{(7–5)}, [4–10]
Loss	11–20	Nov 2015	Champaign, United States	Hard (i)	(United States) Austin Krajicek	(Republic of Ireland) David O'Hare (United Kingdom) Joe Salisbury	1–6, 4–6
Win	12–20	Mar 2016	Irving, United States	Hard	(Pakistan) Aisam-ul-Haq Qureshi	(Australia) Chris Guccione (Brazil) André Sá	6–2, 5–7, [10–4]
Win	13–20	Nov 2018	Houston, United States	Hard	(United States) Austin Krajicek	(El Salvador) Marcelo Arévalo (United States) James Cerretani	4–6, 7–6^{(7–3)}, [10–5]

== Doubles performance timeline ==
Key
W	F	SF	QF	#R	RR	Q#	DNQ	A	NH

(W) winner; (F) finalist; (SF) semifinalist; (QF) quarterfinalist; (#R) rounds 4, 3, 2, 1; (RR) round-robin stage; (Q#) qualification round; (DNQ) did not qualify; (A) absent; (NH) not held; (SR) strike rate (events won / competed); (W–L) win–loss record.
To avoid confusion and double counting, these charts are updated at the conclusion of a tournament or when the player's participation has ended.

Current after the 2022 US Open.

Tournament	2012	2013	2014	2015	2016	2017	2018	2019	2020	2021	2022	SR	W–L
Grand Slam tournaments
Australian Open	A	1R	1R	1R	1R	2R	1R	1R	A	3R	1R	0 / 9	3–9
French Open	A	A	2R	2R	2R	1R	1R	A	QF	2R	2R	0 / 8	8–8
Wimbledon	Q1	2R	1R	2R	1R	3R	1R	2R	NH	1R	2R	0 / 9	6–9
US Open	2R	1R	1R	1R	3R	QF	1R	1R	1R	1R	2R	0 / 11	6–11
Win–loss	1–1	1–3	1–4	2–4	3–4	5–4	0–4	1–3	3–2	3–4	3–4	0 / 37	23–37
ATP Tour Masters 1000
Indian Wells Masters	A	A	A	A	A	A	1R	A	NH	A		0 / 1	0–1
Miami Open	A	A	A	A	QF	F	1R	A	NH	1R		0 / 4	5–4
Monte-Carlo Masters	A	A	A	A	A	A	A	A	NH	A		0 / 0	0–0
Madrid Open	A	A	A	A	A	2R	A	A	NH	A		0 / 1	1–1
Italian Open	A	A	A	A	A	2R	A	A	A	A		0 / 1	1–1
Canadian Open	A	A	A	A	A	1R	A	A	NH	A		0 / 1	0–1
Cincinnati Masters	A	A	A	A	A	A	2R	1R	A	2R		0 / 3	2–3
Shanghai Masters	A	A	A	A	A	1R	A	A	NH			0 / 1	0–1
Paris Masters	A	2R	A	A	QF	2R	A	A	A	A		0 / 3	4–3
Win–loss	0–0	1–1	0–0	0–0	3–2	7–6	1–3	0–1	0–0	0–1	0–0	0 / 14	12–14
Career statistics
Tournaments	3	17	24	23	29	31	29	19	8	24	11	218	
Titles	0	1	1	1	0	0	1	0	0	0	0	4	
Finals	0	3	1	3	0	2	3	1	0	0	0	13	
Overall win–loss	2–3	15–16	13–23	17–22	20–29	32–31	21–28	10–19	6–9	11–24	7–11	154–214	
Year-end ranking	79	53	65	55	52	30	65	100	74	98	182	42%	
