= Jack Sock =

American pickleball player (born 1992)

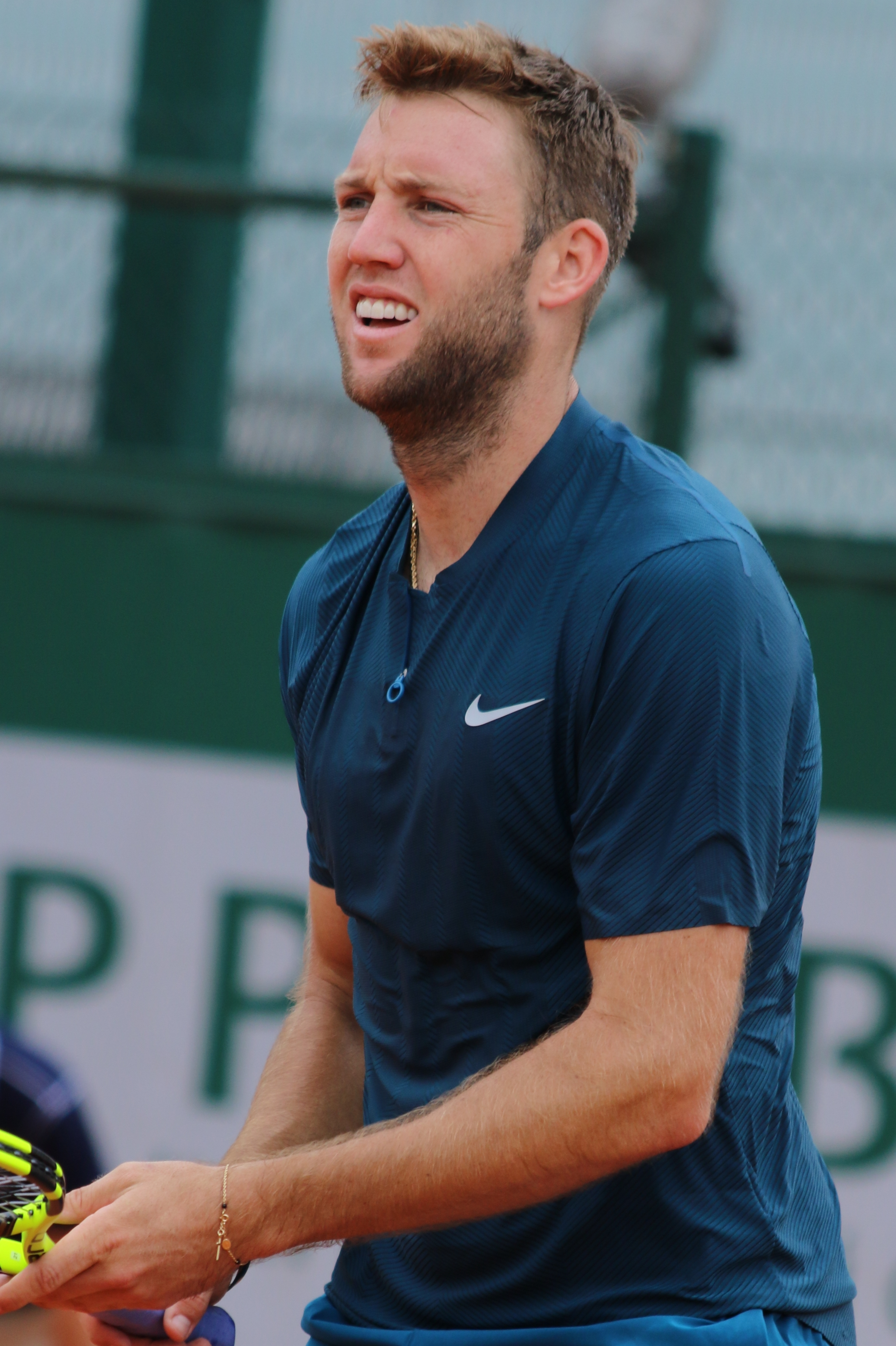
- Sock at the 2018 French Open
- Country (sports): United States
- Residence: Charlotte, North Carolina, U.S.
- Born: September 24, 1992 (age 34) Lincoln, Nebraska, U.S.
- Height: 1.91 m (6 ft 3 in)
- Turned pro: 2011
- Retired: 2023
- Plays: Right-handed (two-handed backhand)
- Prize money: US$ 11,952,110

Singles
- Career record: 181–154
- Career titles: 4
- Highest ranking: No. 8 (November 20, 2017)

Grand Slam singles results
- Australian Open: 3R (2017)
- French Open: 4R (2015)
- Wimbledon: 3R (2016, 2022)
- US Open: 4R (2016)

Other tournaments
- Tour Finals: SF (2017)
- Olympic Games: 1R (2016)

Doubles
- Career record: 210–101
- Career titles: 17
- Highest ranking: No. 2 (September 10, 2018)

Grand Slam doubles results
- Australian Open: QF (2016)
- French Open: QF (2015)
- Wimbledon: W (2014, 2018)
- US Open: W (2018)

Other doubles tournaments
- Tour Finals: W (2018)
- Olympic Games: Bronze (2016)

Mixed doubles
- Career titles: 2

Grand Slam mixed doubles results
- Australian Open: 1R (2013)
- Wimbledon: SF (2022)
- US Open: W (2011)

Other mixed doubles tournaments
- Olympic Games: W (2016)

Team competitions
- Davis Cup: SF (2018)
- Hopman Cup: F (2017)
Olympic medal record
Representing United States
Olympic Games
Gold medal – first place	2016 Rio de Janeiro	Mixed Doubles
Bronze medal – third place	2016 Rio de Janeiro	Doubles
- Last updated on: January 19, 2024.

Jack Sock (born September 24, 1992) is an American former professional tennis player and a current pickleball player. He won four career singles titles and 17 doubles titles on the ATP Tour, and had career-high tennis rankings of world No. 8 in singles (on 20 November 2017) and world No. 2 in doubles (on 10 September 2018).

Sock won four major doubles tennis titles: one in mixed doubles at the 2011 US Open partnering with Melanie Oudin, and three in men's doubles, first at the 2014 Wimbledon Championships partnering with Vasek Pospisil, and then in the 2018 Wimbledon Championships and 2018 US Open partnering with Mike Bryan. Sock also won the 2018 ATP Finals doubles title partnering with Bryan. At the 2016 Rio Olympics, Sock won both a gold medal in mixed doubles partnering with Bethanie Mattek-Sands, and a bronze medal in men's doubles partnering with Steve Johnson.

In tennis singles, Sock is a former junior US Open champion, victor at the 2017 Paris Masters, and semifinalist at the 2017 ATP Finals.

== Personal life ==
Sock moved from Nebraska to Kansas at the age of 11.

He graduated from Blue Valley North High School in Overland Park, Kansas, and finished his KSHSAA 6A high school tennis career with an 80–0 record and four consecutive state championships in singles. In high school, he also played doubles with his brother Eric, and they won the team state championship together in Jack's sophomore year. Jack went on to win two more team state championships after Eric graduated and began playing college tennis at the University of Nebraska–Lincoln. Jack and Eric also played doubles at the ATP Tour level as a wild card entry in the 2017 BB&T Atlanta Open.

=== Philanthropy ===
Sock appeared at the Match for Africa 5 alongside Roger Federer, Bill Gates and Savannah Guthrie on March 5, 2018 at the SAP Center in San Jose, California. The friendly, best-of-three sets, charity exhibition match raised $2.5 million to benefit children's education in Africa, with net proceeds going to the Roger Federer Foundation. Federer won the singles match 7–6, 6–4 and the doubles match 6–3.

== Junior career ==
As a junior, Sock reached No. 22 in the world combined rankings in October 2010. He played his first ITF junior tournament in October 2008, at age 16, at the Pan American Championships. At the 2009 US Open, his third junior tournament, he reached the semifinals of the junior doubles with Matthew Kandath, and the third round of the junior singles.

Sock played relatively infrequently on the junior circuit, however, entering just two further tournaments: the Dunlop Orange Bowl in 2009 and the junior singles at the 2010 U.S. Open. At this tournament, he received a wildcard entry, but proceeded to the final. There, he defeated fellow American Denis Kudla in three sets, to become the first American winner of the junior championships since Andy Roddick in 2000. He won the Boy's Junior National Tennis Championship in 2010 and 2011, earning a wildcard in both years for the main draw of the US Open.

== Professional career ==
=== Early career ===
Sock began playing in Futures tournaments in 2009, winning his first senior tournament on that circuit in November 2009. He entered his first qualifying draw for an ATP tournament at the 2010 Miami Masters. His first main-draw match as a professional came at the 2010 US Open, where he lost to Marco Chiudinelli. Sock finished the 2010 season ranked 878th in the world.

In 2011, he reached the final of the USA F3 tournament. He also began to play in a few tournaments at Challenger level, with his biggest success being a quarterfinal at the Dallas Challenger. He competed in the main draw of the 2011 Miami Masters. As 2010 US Junior champion, he received a wildcard into the 2011 US Open, winning his first ATP match against Marc Gicquel in four sets. He advanced to play Andy Roddick, a fellow Nebraskan, in the second round; however, he lost in straight sets. Sock's real breakthrough came in the mixed doubles, however, where he advanced to the final alongside Melanie Oudin, defeating the defending champions Bob Bryan and Liezel Huber in the second round. In the final, Sock and Oudin defeated Gisela Dulko and Eduardo Schwank in three sets to win their first Grand Slam title, both individually and together.

After winning his first Grand Slam title, Sock returned to competing on the Challenger Tour. His most successful tournament was the Sacramento Challenger, in which he reached the quarterfinals of the singles tournament and, partnering with Nicholas Monroe, the final of the doubles tournament. Sock finished 2011 ranked No. 381 in singles and No. 370 in the doubles.

In 2012, Sock won the Futures tournament at Plantation, as well as losing in the doubles final. Stepping back up to the Challenger level, he competed at the Honolulu Challenger, making the quarterfinals of the singles tournament and, alongside Nick Monroe, once again made the final of the doubles tournament.

Sock played in the 2012 Campbell's Hall of Fame Tennis Championships, and lost in the second round to Izak van der Merwe. Sock's next tournament was the 2012 BB&T Atlanta Open. He upset the seventh seed, Alex Bogomolov, Jr. He made it to the quarterfinals, where he lost to John Isner. At the US Open, Sock defeated the 22nd seed, Florian Mayer, in the first round when Mayer retired. He then went on to defeat world No. 85 Flavio Cipolla of Italy in straight sets, setting up his first ever Grand Slam third round match against 11th seed Nicolás Almagro, but was defeated in four sets. In the final two months of the 2012 season, Sock reached his first two Challenger Tour finals, winning at Tiburon in October and finishing as runner-up in the November Champaign-Urbana Challenger. These finals helped him rise to the top 150 for the first time.

=== 2013: Top 100 ===
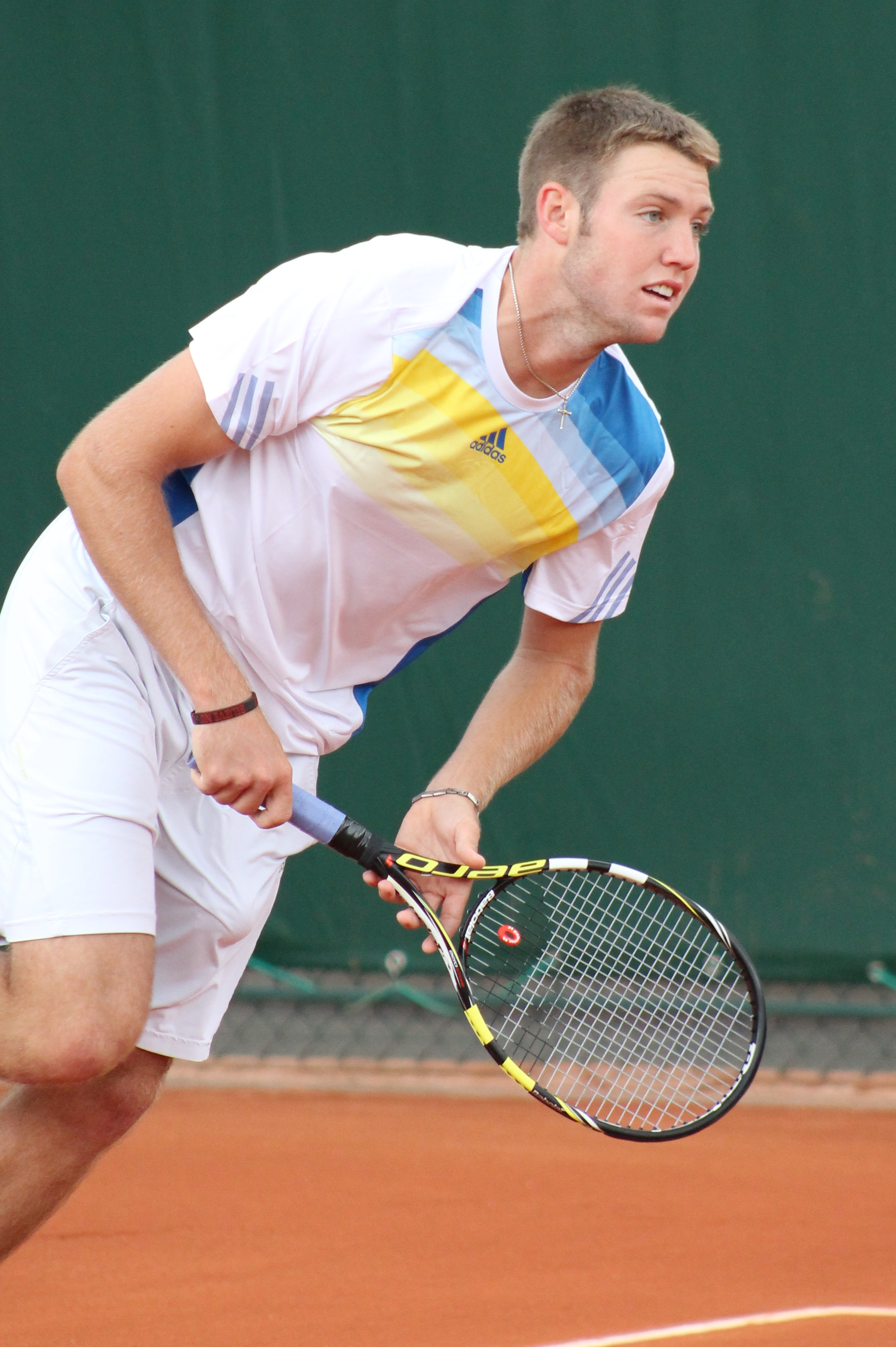
Sock at the 2013 French Open

Sock had a slow start to 2013, losing in qualifying at the Brisbane International and the 2013 Australian Open. However, he received a wildcard entry into the U.S. National Indoor Tennis Championships, in which he gained his first wins of the season, reaching the quarterfinals for the second time in his career. In the doubles competition at the same tournament, Sock teamed up with James Blake, also a wildcard entry, reaching the final, where the pair lost to the Bryan brothers. Sock made it through three rounds of qualifying without dropping a set to enter the main draw of the 2013 French Open. In the first round, he defeated the accomplished player Guillermo García López in only 1 hour and 59 minutes. He then lost to 35-year-old veteran Tommy Haas in straight sets. He tried to qualify for Wimbledon for the first time, but although seeded second, lost to Mischa Zverev. He returned to the US to win his second career Challenger level title in Winnetka, Illinois on July 6, allowing him to break into the top 100 for the first time in his career. At the US Open, he defeated Philipp Petzschner in the first round, going 5 games to 2 up in the third set before Petzschner retired. Sock then went on to beat Maximo Gonzalez, However, he lost to 18th seed Janko Tipsarević in the third round. Following the US Open, his ranking rose to No. 86.

=== 2014: Major doubles title ===
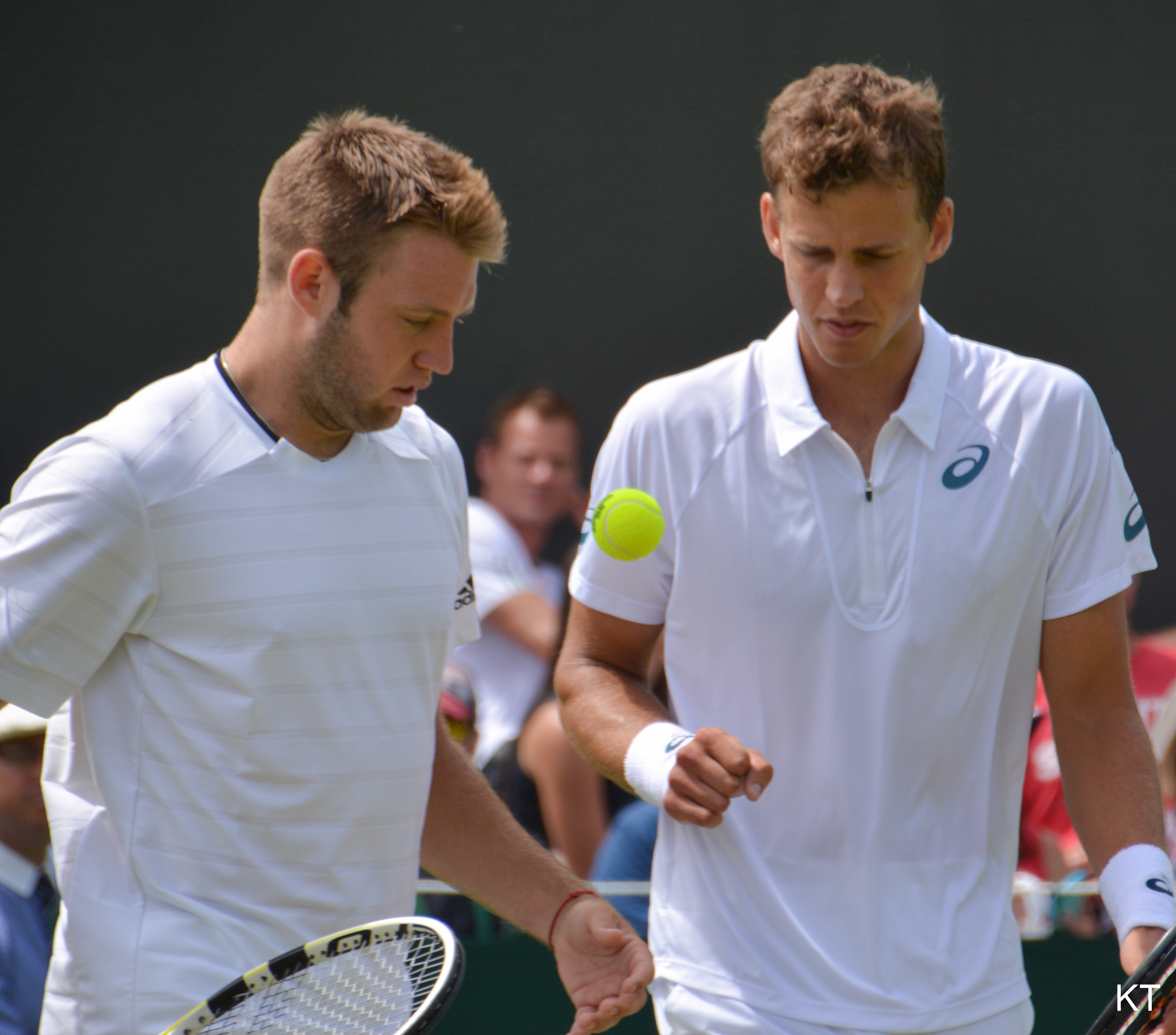
Sock and Vasek Pospisil (pictured in 2015) won the gentlemen's doubles title at the 2014 Wimbledon Championships

Sock began his 2014 campaign in Auckland against Frenchman Adrian Mannarino. His aggressive playing style was too much for his opponent, and he won in straight sets to set up a match with German second seed Tommy Haas. In a considerable upset, Sock defeated the world No. 12 in straight sets to advance to the quarterfinals. There he faced Spaniard Roberto Bautista Agut, but lost in straight sets. He then gained his first direct entry into the Australian Open main draw, after having failed to qualify the previous year. He started strongly, defeating German Tobias Kamke in four sets in his opening match, before losing to former world No. 7 Gaël Monfils in the second round.

At Wimbledon, Sock at the last moment teamed up with Canadian Vasek Pospisil, and they won the men's doubles title in a five-set final against the top seeds, Bob and Mike Bryan.

Sock beat Bernard Tomic and world No. 6 Kei Nishikori to reach the third round of the 2014 Shanghai Rolex Masters.

In December, he underwent hip surgery, sidelining him for the start of the 2015 season.

=== 2015: Top 25, First ATP singles title ===
After missing the first two months of 2015 ATP season, Sock made his return at 2015 BNP Paribas Open. He won his first three matches, including victories over seeded players Gilles Müller and Roberto Bautista Agut. He lost in the fourth round to second seed Roger Federer in straight sets. In doubles, he resumed his partnership with Pospisil to win their first Masters level tournament.

His second tournament was the 2015 Miami Open, in which he won his first two matches, including beating 21st seed Fabio Fognini, before losing to Dominic Thiem in the third round. He made the doubles final, again partnering with Pospisil, but lost in a third-set tiebreaker to the Bryan brothers.

Sock continued his successful start to the year by winning his first ATP tournament, the 2015 U.S. Men's Clay Court Championships. En route to the title, he knocked off second seed Roberto Bautista Agut, fifth seed Santiago Giraldo, third seed Kevin Anderson, and eighth seed Sam Querrey in the final. He then competed in the 2015 Mutua Madrid Open in Spain, advancing to the second round by beating wildcard Pablo Andújar in straight sets, before losing to 12th seed Jo-Wilfried Tsonga.

At the French Open, Sock upset 10th seeded Grigor Dimitrov in the first round in straight sets. He continued his run by beating Pablo Carreño Busta in four sets and teenager Borna Ćorić in straight sets. At age 22, he became the youngest American to reach the round of 16 at the French Open since Pete Sampras in 1993. In the fourth round, he lost in four sets to defending champion Rafael Nadal.

Sock collapsed at the US Open, and was forced to retire against Ruben Bemelmans despite being ahead in the match.

On November 2, Sock reached the top 25 for the first time in his career. For the second straight year, he and Pospisil finished 9th in the ATP Doubles Race to London rankings, just barely failing to qualify for the year-end championship tournament.

=== 2016: Olympic medals, American singles No. 1 ===
Sock began his season at the 2016 Hopman Cup, representing the USA alongside Serena Williams, who was ultimately replaced by Victoria Duval due to injury. In the round-robin stage, Sock's only singles win was over Jiří Veselý. Sock and Duval recorded wins in the mixed doubles over Ukraine and the Czech Republic. They did not proceed to the final.

At the Auckland Open, Sock reached his third career ATP final by beating a top-10 player David Ferrer for the second time in his career, despite losing the first set and battling flu-like symptoms. He ended up retiring in the final due to that illness. Sock began the clay-court season by reaching his second consecutive final in Houston, but was unable to defend his title after struggling with an injury in the last set of the final.

Sock played in all three tennis competitions at the Olympic Games in Rio de Janeiro. Despite losing in the first round in singles, he earned a bronze medal in doubles with Steve Johnson and a gold medal in mixed doubles with Bethanie Mattek-Sands.

At the Shanghai Masters, Sock defeated Milos Raonic for the first time in their last nine matches to reach his first career Masters quarterfinal. With this run, he became the top-ranked American for the first time in his career.

=== 2017: World No. 8, Masters title, ATP Finals ===
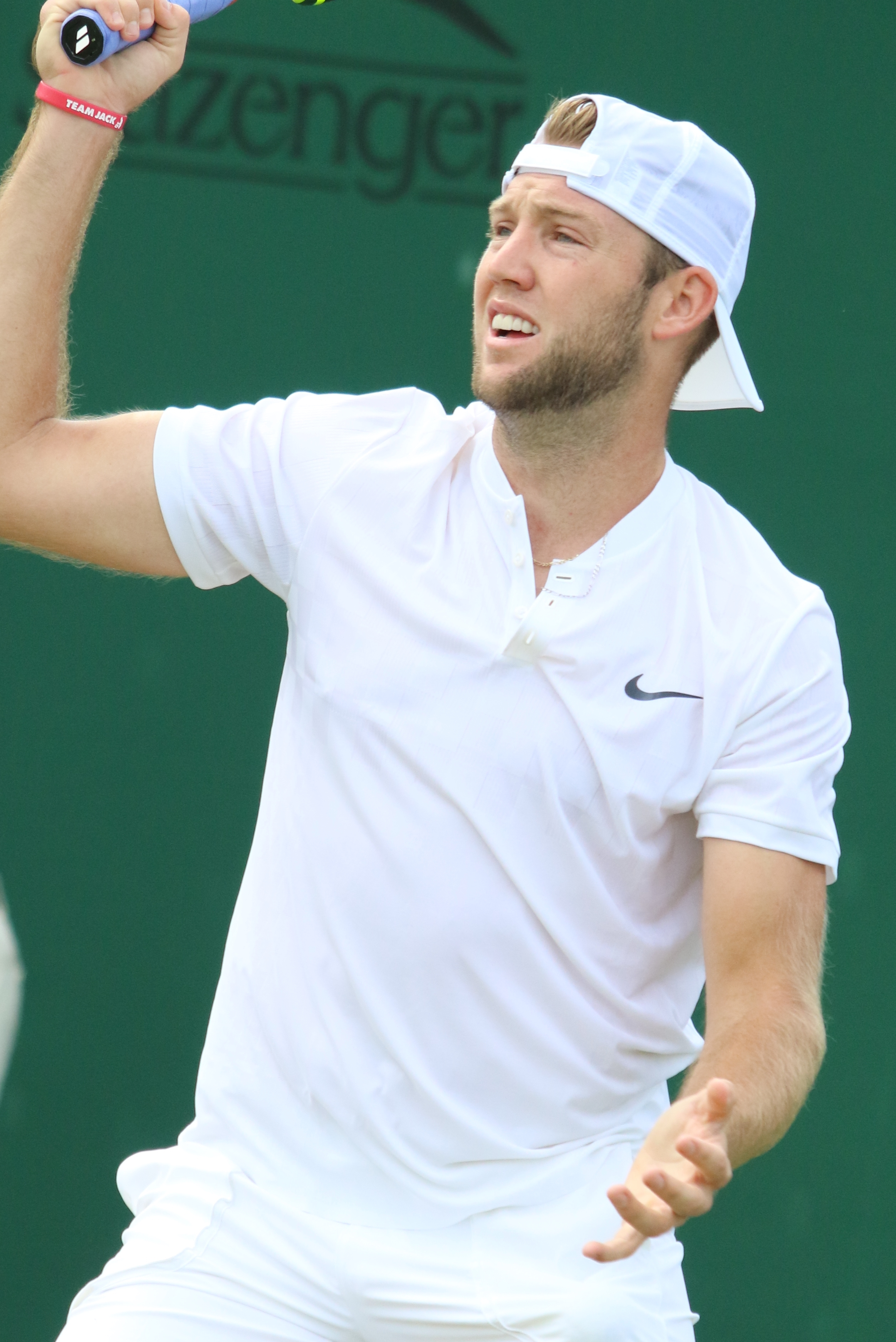
Sock at the 2017 Wimbledon Championships

Once again, Sock opened up the season with the Hopman Cup and the Auckland Open. He reached the final at the Hopman Cup with Coco Vandeweghe while dropping just one set in the three round-robin matches, but lost in the final to the French team of Richard Gasquet and Kristina Mladenovic. Sock then followed this performance with an even better result at the Auckland Open by reaching the final for the second year in a row, this time winning the title against João Sousa. With the win, he moved into the top 20 for the first time. Sock finished his stretch down under by making his first appearance in the third round of the Australian Open, where he lost to Jo-Wilfried Tsonga.

In February, Sock returned home to the United States where he helped the Davis Cup team sweep their 1st-round rubber against Switzerland. At the end of the month, he played at the Delray Beach Open and won his second title in two months after Milos Raonic withdrew from the final with a hamstring injury. This title took Sock to a career high of 18 in the ATP rankings. Sock continued his impressive streak of deep runs in Masters events by reaching his first career Masters semi-final at the BNP Paribas Open in Indian Wells. Along the way, he upset No. 13 Grigor Dimitrov and No. 5 Kei Nishikori, the latter of which was his first career victory over a Top 5 opponent.

After a relatively quiet middle of the season, Sock finished the year strong by winning the biggest tournament of his career at the Paris Masters, defeating Filip Krajinović in the final. He became the first American to win a Masters event since Andy Roddick won the Miami Masters in 2010, and the first to win the Paris Masters since Andre Agassi in 1999. This result was particularly impressive because Sock was a game away from going out in his first match, when he was down 5–1 to Kyle Edmund in the third set. With the win, Sock also made his debut in the Top 10, finished the year as the top-ranked American, and qualified for the 2017 ATP Finals. He was the first American to qualify for the year-end championships in singles since Mardy Fish in 2011.

In the final tournament of the year, Sock rebounded from an opening match loss to Roger Federer to finish second in the Boris Becker group. In the round robin, he won matches against World No. 5 Marin Čilić and then World No. 3 Alexander Zverev, the latter of which was the first Top 3 opponent he ever defeated. Although Sock would lose to eventual champion Grigor Dimitrov in the semifinals, the two wins solidified his year-end ranking in the top 10 at No. 8 in the world.

=== 2018: Wimbledon, US Open & Tour Finals doubles titles ===
Sock was unable to match his success at the Hopman Cup and the Auckland Open from the previous year. Struggling with fitness issues, he won just one match between those two tournaments and the Australian Open, where he lost in the first round to Yūichi Sugita for the third time in the last six months. In particular, the tournament organizers in Auckland criticized Sock for showing a lack of effort in his match against Peter Gojowczyk and considered withholding the $100,000 appearance fee they promised him for playing in the event.

Sock's poor start to the season continued at the 2018 Delray Beach Open, where as the top seed and defending champion he lost in the second round to Reilly Opelka ranked number 228. However, he did win the doubles title, partnering with Jackson Withrow.

Sock's singles struggles continued into Indian Wells and Miami. In singles at the 2018 BNP Paribas Open, Sock recorded a 6–2, 7–5 win over Thomas Fabbiano in the round of 64, but then fell 6–7, 6–4, 4–6 to Feliciano López. However, Sock won the doubles title with his partner, John Isner, after recording impressive victories over Ivan Dodig and Rajeev Ram, Oliver Marach and Mate Pavić, and Bob and Mike Bryan. In singles at the 2018 Miami Open, Sock recorded a 6–3, 7–6 win over Yuki Bhambri the round of 64, but then fell 7–5, 6–7, 3–6 to rising star, Borna Ćorić. Sock and his partner, Nicholas Monroe, failed to record a win in doubles with a 1–6, 6–7 loss to Jean-Julien Rojer and Horia Tecău in the round 32.

Sock's struggles in singles continued at the French Open and Wimbledon where he recorded first round losses at both events including a loss from two sets up against the Italian Matteo Berrettini at the latter event. Both losses were marked by profane outbursts and constant complaining from Sock. For this, Sock was fined $5,000. At Wimbledon, a spectator even shouted at Sock, "Put a sock in it, Jack!" Sock's success in doubles continued as he won Wimbledon along with his doubles partner, Mike Bryan.

During the American Summer, Jack Sock once again lost in the first round at both the Roger's Cup and 2018 Western & Southern Open. This was followed by a second-round exit to Nikoloz Basilashvili at the US Open singles. Continuing his partnership with Mike Bryan, he achieved his first US Open Men's doubles trophy, defeating Łukasz Kubot and Marcelo Melo in straight sets.

As with last year, Sock was invited to the 2018 Laver Cup as part of Team World. He was defeated by Kyle Edmund by 6–4, 5–7, 10–6 in the afternoon session of the first day. His partnership with Kevin Anderson was more successful, winning 6–7(5), 6–3, 10–6 against Roger Federer and Novak Djokovic. The second evening doubles session saw him partner up with Nick Kyrgios, scoring a straight-sets victory over Grigor Dimitrov and David Goffin. The final doubles match of the Laver Cup saw him and countryman John Isner triumph over Roger Federer and Alexander Zverev over two sets and a tight super-tiebreak. Sock's efforts propelled Team World to a first-ever lead over Team Europe by 8–7, though Team Europe claimed the Cup at (13-8) after winning its next two singles matches.

The fall Asian swing started poorly for Sock. He was defeated in his first match of the China Open by Nikoloz Basilashvili. Competing in doubles with countryman Nicholas Monroe, he lost in straight sets to Denys Molchanov and Igor Zelenay in the first round. At the Shanghai Masters, Sock was seeded 12th in singles but lost to Peter Gojowczyk in the first round. Sock and Mike Bryan were the top seeds in doubles, but lost in the first round to Horacio Zeballos and Julio Peralta.

Sock's best singles results in 2018 came at his title defense at the Paris Masters. Seeded sixteenth, he defeated Richard Gasquet and Malek Jaziri in straight sets to reach the quarterfinals. There, he was defeated by sixth seed Dominic Thiem. This loss saw him fall 82 ranking places in a single week, to No. 105.

Being the only team to win two Grand Slams during the year, Sock and Mike Bryan qualified on 14 October 2018 as the 5th seeds in doubles for the 2018 ATP Finals, where they defeated Pierre-Hugues Herbert and Nicolas Mahut to win the title.

=== 2019: Injuries and return to competition ===
Sock did not participate in any tournaments during the lead up to the Australian Open, an event in which he entered as a wild card and lost in the first round to Australian wild card Alex Bolt, 6–4, 3–6, 2–6, 2–6. Following the tournament, he suffered an injury during a practice to two ligaments in his thumb, which required operation and left him struggling to complete tasks such as opening bottles or brushing his teeth.

After various setbacks in his return to the tour, Sock made his return to competitive tennis in July at the Atlanta Open, where he lost to Miomir Kecmanović 6–7(9), 6–7(5). He partnered with Jackson Withrow in the doubles draw, reaching the semifinal before falling to the pairing of Dominic Inglot and Austin Krajicek. He continued his efforts at the Western & Southern Open in Cincinnati, losing as a wild card in the first round of qualifying to Mikhail Kukushkin.

He received a wild card from the USTA into the men's singles main draw at the 2019 U.S. Open, extending his streak of participating in the draw to a decade, but lost in the first round. In doubles, partnering with Jackson Withrow, he reached the quarterfinals defeating the Bryan Brothers en route but lost to 15th seed Jamie Murray/Neal Skupski.

Sock dropped out of the singles ATP rankings on November 4 and finished the year without a ranking.

=== 2020: First ATP win since 2018 ===
Sock received a wildcard into the Delray Beach Open. There, he defeated 8th seed and defending champion Radu Albot which would be his first ATP match win since the 2019 Laver Cup and before that the 2018 Rolex Paris Masters. He lost in the next round to Steve Johnson in three sets. Because of the win, he re-entered the ATP rankings with a ranking of 767.

At the Indian Wells Challenger, Sock reached his first singles final of any kind in close to three years. He lost to Steve Johnson in straight sets. As a result, his ranking improved from No. 768 to No. 384.

Sock was forced out of tennis for five months due to the COVID-19 pandemic suspending competition in March. When competition resumed in August, he returned at the US Open using a protected ranking, where he defeated Pablo Cuevas in the first round in five sets. He lost in the next round to 32nd seed Adrian Mannarino in straight sets. His ranking would improve to No. 303 due to the result. One month later at the French Open, he entered the qualifying draw as a protected ranking where he defeated Mikael Torpegaard, Facundo Bagnis and Andrey Kuznetsov to qualify for the main draw. There, he defeated Reilly Opelka in the first round in straight sets but lost in the next round to 3rd seed Dominic Thiem in straight sets. His ranking would improve to No. 249 because of the result.

Despite not even being ranked at the beginning of the year, Sock finished the year with a ranking of World No. 253.

=== 2021: Doubles title, US Open third round ===
Sock started off the year by playing in challenger events from March to June which resulted in a doubles title at the Orlando Open partnering with Mitchell Krueger. At the Little Rock Challenger, Sock won his first singles title of any kind in close to four years defeating 3rd seed Emilio Gómez in the final.

Having been given a wildcard into his first ATP tournament of the year at the Hall of Fame Open in Newport, Sock made his first ATP tour level quarterfinal since the 2018 Paris Masters. He beat Alex Bolt and third seed Yoshihito Nishioka before being defeated by eighth seed and eventual champion Kevin Anderson in three sets. At the same tournament he partnered as a wildcard pair with William Blumberg. The unseeded pair reached the finals by defeating fellow Americans Tennys Sandgren and Denis Kudla, third seeds John-Patrick Smith and Harri Heliövaara, and second seeds Jonathan Erlich and Santiago González. In the final they defeated Austin Krajicek and Vasek Pospisil. He also received a wildcard into the Citi Open where once again defeated Yoshihito Nishioka in the first round to play world No. 3 Rafael Nadal in the second round. The match went to three sets and the third set was decided in a tiebreak but he fell short.

Sock received a wildcard into the US Open singles main draw. He defeated Yoshihito Nishioka in the first round in four sets and followed his victory up with a five-set victory over 31st seed Alexander Bublik in the second round, marking the first time he made the third round of a grand slam since the 2017 Australian Open. In the third round, he played 4th seed Alexander Zverev and won the first set but lost the next two sets and retired early in the fourth set due to an upper right leg injury.

=== 2022: Indian Wells title & back to top 50 in doubles & top 100 in singles ===
Sock partnered with John Isner in doubles at Indian Wells as a wildcard pair, and they won the doubles title, beating Santiago González and Édouard Roger-Vasselin in the final.

He reached the ATP Challenger final at the 2022 Ilkley Trophy where he lost to qualifier Zizou Bergs. He qualified for the 2022 Wimbledon Championships in singles after a three year absence and reached the third round. At the same tournament he reached the doubles quarterfinals with Denis Kudla and the mixed doubles semifinals with Coco Gauff. He returned to the top 100 in singles and to the top 50 in doubles at world No. 48 on 11 July 2022.

At the US Open, Sock retired in the fourth set of his first round match against Diego Schwartzman due to back injury.

=== 2023: Retirement ===
On 27 August 2023, Sock announced that the US Open would be the final event of his career. He played his last match in mixed doubles with Coco Gauff.

=== 2025: Final appearance ===
In July 2025, Sock returned for one tournament at the Newport Challenger, partnering billionaire Bill Ackman in his pro tennis debut.

== Pickleball ==
In May 2023, Sock made his professional pickleball debut at the PPA North Carolina Open in singles, men's doubles and mixed doubles. Sock partnered with world No. 1 Anna Leigh Waters to win the mixed doubles title. As a result, he reached #22 and #74 in the PPA Tour's men's mixed doubles and men's singles rankings, respectively.

In August 2023, it was announced that Sock had signed on to play full-time on the PPA Tour.

As of 7 June 2024, Sock is ranked world No. 9 (and is fifth in the race) in singles.

== World TeamTennis ==
Sock played three seasons with World TeamTennis starting in 2017 when he debuted in the league with the Springfield Lasers, where he also played the following year. Sock was a member of the 2020 New York Empire during the 2020 WTT season at The Greenbrier. The Empire claimed the 2020 WTT Championship with a super-tiebreaker win over the Chicago Smash, and Sock was named the 2020 WTT Finals Male MVP.

== Sportsmanship ==
On two occasions, Sock has conceded points where he believed the linesperson made an incorrect call.

One particular instance of this sportsmanship came at the 2016 Hopman Cup. During the match against Lleyton Hewitt, Hewitt was serving to stay in the first set when his first serve at 30–0 was called out by the chair umpire. Prior to Hewitt hitting his second serve, Sock said: "That was in if you want to challenge it." The review showed the serve to be in, giving Hewitt the point.

Later in the year, Sock awarded a point to Richard Gasquet at the Paris Masters on an ace that was called out, saving Gasquet the need to use a challenge. The review confirmed that the serve did land in the box on the line.

== Playing style ==
Sock prefers to hit with controlled spin. He often hits "whiplash" forehands, using his body-rotation and elbow to generate tremendous pace and topspin with a minimal take back. The average topspin rpm (revolutions per minute) on Sock's forehand was once measured to be at 3800 during his 2015 season, more so than that of Rafael Nadal's peak average (3200 rpm), and peaked at 5000rpm.

Andy Roddick has remarked that he and young Sock have similar playing styles, saying, "[Sock] kind of has the half take up with the serve. He's got the flailing elbow on the forehand and the backhand." Sock feels that he and Spaniard Rafael Nadal actually have a more similar playing style, stating in an interview in 2012 that "Nadal prefers the forehand to the backhand and hits with incredible spin. I also like to hit with more spin than pace and prefer my forehand."

Sock has a very strong service game, being able to hit serves at speeds of up to 227 km/h (141 mph). He is fast around the court, and is particularly good at running around his backhand to hit powerful inside-in or inside-out forehands. His great court speed allows him to retrieve many shots and use his forehand, his main weapon from the baseline, more frequently. Sock aggressively slides his left foot on the ground when running to his forehand, which wore a hole in his sock and shoe, and drew blood, at the 2015 BNP Paribas Open.

Some commentators have remarked that his technique on the forehand, while quite effective, actually hinders his ability to hit returns well. If Sock has a successful singles career, it will be in spite of, not because of, his technique, according to retired American tennis champion and now commentator Jim Courier. At the net, Sock is very effective thanks to extremely fast reflexes, making him very high-rated also as doubles player.

== Career statistics ==
=== Performance timelines ===
Key
W	F	SF	QF	#R	RR	Q#	DNQ	A	NH

(W) winner; (F) finalist; (SF) semifinalist; (QF) quarterfinalist; (#R) rounds 4, 3, 2, 1; (RR) round-robin stage; (Q#) qualification round; (DNQ) did not qualify; (A) absent; (NH) not held; (SR) strike rate (events won / competed); (W–L) win–loss record.
To avoid confusion and double counting, these charts are updated at the conclusion of a tournament or when the player's participation has ended.

==== Singles ====
Tournament	2010	2011	2012	2013	2014	2015	2016	2017	2018	2019	2020	2021	2022	2023	SR	W–L	Win %
Grand Slam tournaments
Australian Open	A	A	A	Q1	2R	A	2R	3R	1R	1R	A	A	A	A	0 / 5	4–5	44%
French Open	A	A	A	2R	3R	4R	3R	1R	1R	A	2R	A	Q1	A	0 / 7	9–7	56%
Wimbledon	A	A	A	Q1	2R	1R	3R	2R	1R	A	NH	A	3R	A	0 / 6	6–6	50%
US Open	1R	2R	3R	3R	1R	2R	4R	1R	2R	1R	2R	3R	1R	A	0 / 13	13–13	50%
Win–loss	0–1	1–1	2–1	3–2	4–4	4–3	8–4	3–4	1–4	0–2	2–2	2–1	2–2	0–0	0 / 31	32–31	51%
Year-end championship
ATP Finals	did not qualify							SF	did not qualify						0 / 1	2–2	50%

==== Doubles ====
Tournament	2010	2011	2012	2013	2014	2015	2016	2017	2018	2019	2020	2021	2022	2023	SR	W–L	Win %
Grand Slam tournaments
Australian Open	A	A	A	A	A	A	QF	A	A	3R	A	A	A	A	0 / 2	4–2	67%
French Open	A	A	A	2R	3R	QF	2R	A	3R	A	2R	A	A	A	0 / 6	10–6	64%
Wimbledon	A	A	A	A	W	3R	3R	A	W	A	NH	A	QF	1R	2 / 6	19–4	83%
US Open	A	1R	2R	1R	3R	1R	A	A	W	QF	2R	2R	A	1R	1 / 10	14–8	64%
Win–loss	0–0	0–1	1–1	1–2	10–2	5–3	5–3	0–0	14–1	5–2	2–2	1–0	3–1	0–2	3 / 24	47–20	70%
Year-end championship
ATP Finals	did not qualify								W	did not qualify					1 / 1	4–1	80%

Awards
Preceded by (United States) Mike Bryan & (United States) Bob Bryan	ATP Fans' Favorite Team (with (United States) Mike Bryan); 2018	Succeeded by (United States) Mike Bryan & (United States) Bob Bryan
Preceded by (Poland) Łukasz Kubot & (Brazil) Marcelo Melo	ITF Men's Doubles World Champion (with (United States) Mike Bryan); 2018	Succeeded by (Colombia) Juan Sebastián Cabal & (Colombia) Robert Farah
