= Natomas Men's Professional Tennis Tournament =

- 2015 Sacramento Challenger

Defunct tennis tournament
- Location: Sacramento, California, United States
- Venue: Natomas Racquet Club
- Category: ATP Challenger Series
- Surface: Hard / Outdoors
- Draw: 32S/16Q/16D
- Prize money: $50,000
- Website: Website

The Natomas Men's Professional Tennis Tournament was a tennis tournament held in Sacramento, California, United States from 2005 until 2015. The event was part of the ATP Challenger Tour and was played on outdoor hard courts.

== Past finals ==
=== Singles ===
Year	Champion	Runner-up	Score
2015	(United States) Taylor Harry Fritz	(United States) Jared Donaldson	6–4, 3–6, 6–4
2014	(United States) Sam Querrey	(United States) Stefan Kozlov	6–3, 6–4
2013	(United States) Donald Young	(United States) Tim Smyczek	7–5, 6–3
2012	(United States) James Blake	(Germany) Mischa Zverev	6–1, 1–6, 6–4
2011	(Croatia) Ivo Karlović	(United States) James Blake	6–4, 3–6, 6–4
2010	(Australia) John Millman	(United States) Robert Kendrick	6–3, 6–2
2009	(Colombia) Santiago Giraldo	(United States) Jesse Levine	7–6^{(7–4)}, 6–1
2008	(United States) Donald Young	(United States) Robert Kendrick	6–4, 6–1
2007	(United States) Wayne Odesnik	(Chinese Taipei) Lu Yen-hsun	6–2, 6–3
2006	(United States) Paul Goldstein	(United States) Rajeev Ram	7–6, 4–6, 7–5
2005	(South Africa) Rik de Voest	(United States) Phillip Simmonds	3–6, 6–3, 6–4

=== Doubles ===
Year	Champion	Runner-up	Score
2015	(Slovenia) Blaž Kavčič (Slovenia) Grega Žemlja	(Germany) Daniel Brands (Germany) Dustin Brown	6–1, 3–6, [10–3]
2014	(Australia) Adam Hubble (Australia) John-Patrick Smith	(Canada) Peter Polansky (Canada) Adil Shamasdin	6–3, 6–2
2013	(Australia) Matt Reid (Australia) John-Patrick Smith	(United States) Jarmere Jenkins (United States) Donal Young	7-6^{(7-1 )},3-6, [14-12]
2012	(United States) Tennys Sandgren (United States) Rhyne Williams	(United States) Devin Britton (United States) Austin Krajicek	4–6, 6–4, [12–10]
2011	(Australia) Carsten Ball (Australia) Chris Guccione	(United States) Nicholas Monroe (United States) Jack Sock	7–6^{(7–3)}, 1–6, [10–5]
2010	(South Africa) Rik de Voest (South Africa) Izak van der Merwe	(United States) Nicholas Monroe (United States) Donald Young	4–6, 6–4, [10–7]
2009	(United States) Lester Cook (United States) David Martin	(Mexico) Santiago González (United States) Travis Rettenmaier	4–6, 6–3, [10–5]
2008	(United States) Brian Battistone (United States) Dann Battistone	(United States) John Isner (United States) Rajeev Ram	1–6, 6–3, [10–4]
2007	(United States) Robert Kendrick (United States) Brian Wilson	(United States) John Paul Fruttero (United States) Sam Warburg	7–5, 7–6
2006	(United States) Paul Goldstein (United States) Jeff Morrison	(United States) Amer Delic (United States) Brian Wilson	6–1, 6–3
2005	(United States) Scott Lipsky (United States) David Martin	(United States) John Paul Fruttero (United States) Mirko Pehar	6–4, 6–4
