= Rhyne Williams =

American tennis player (born 1991)

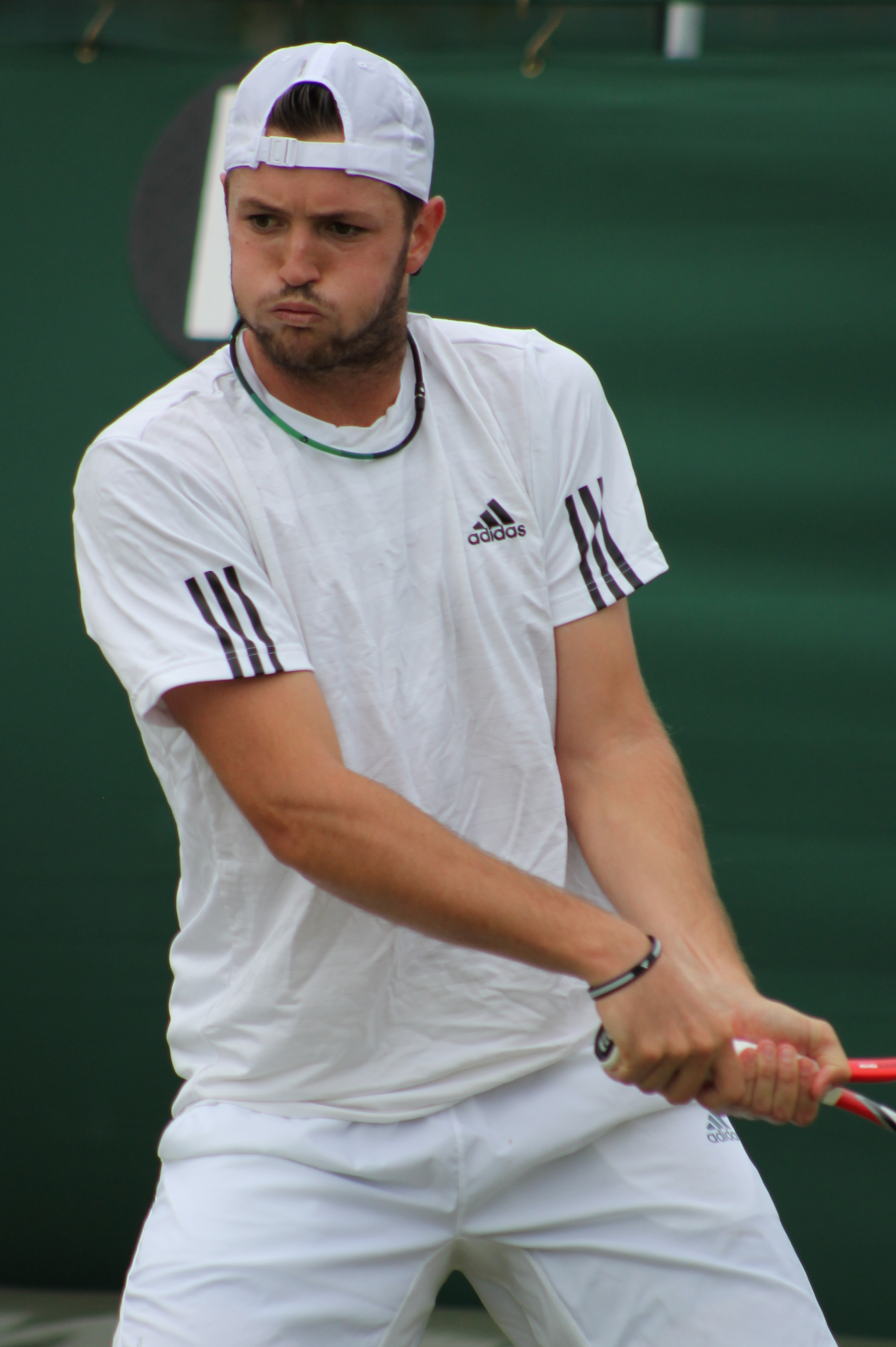
- Country (sports): USA
- Residence: Tampa, Florida, USA
- Born: March 22, 1991 (age 35) Knoxville, Tennessee
- Height: 1.85 m (6 ft 1 in)
- Turned pro: 2011
- Retired: 2018
- Plays: Right-handed (two-handed backhand)
- College: University of Tennessee
- Coach: Christopher Williams
- Prize money: $460,807

Singles
- Career record: 7–18 (in ATP World Tour and Grand Slam main draw matches)
- Career titles: 0
- Highest ranking: No. 114 (12 August 2013)

Grand Slam singles results
- Australian Open: 1R (2013, 2014)
- French Open: 1R (2013)
- Wimbledon: Q3 (2013)
- US Open: 1R (2012, 2013)

Doubles
- Career record: 3–2
- Career titles: 0
- Highest ranking: No. 141 (15 July 2013)

Grand Slam doubles results
- US Open: 1R (2011)

Coaching career
- Dominik Koepfer (2018–); Zachary Svajda (2022-)

Robert Rhyne Williams (born March 22, 1991) is a former American tennis player and current tennis coach. He played his last ATP match in 2018, and is coaching fellow collegiate player Dominik Koepfer, and Zachary Svajda.

Williams first played on the professional circuit in 2006, but turned full-time professional in July 2011. Williams is the nephew of Mike De Palmer, former ATP pro (Top 35 in Singles, Top 20 in Doubles) who coached Boris Becker from 1994 to 1999. He is the grandson of Mike DePalmer Sr, a coach at University of Tennessee (from 1981 to 1994). His grandfather is a member of the Intercollegiate Tennis Association Hall of Fame and is the co-founder of the Nick Bollettieri Tennis Academy. His career-high ranking was world no. 114.

== Personal life ==
Robert Rhyne Williams (nickname is Rhyno) is the second child of Robert Rhyne Williams Sr. (Bob) and Michelle DePalmer-Williams. Bob played college tennis at Duke University, Michelle and uncle Mike played at University of Tennessee. Michelle is a former Top 100 Pro and Orange Bowl 16s Champion. Uncle Mike is a former top-35 singles and top-20 doubles player. Both sisters (Jennifer and Caitlyn) also grew up playing tennis with Caitlyn currently on the Lady Vols Team. Jennifer played for Birmingham-Southern College.

Rhyne is the grandson of Mike DePalmer Sr., a long time coach at UT (from 1981–94). His grandfather, a member of the ITA Hall of Fame, co-founded the Nick Bollettieri Tennis Academy. The academy was created to train little Michelle.

Rhyne also played baseball and basketball during his childhood and once considered choosing baseball over tennis.

Rhyne was last coached by his cousin, Christopher Williams. He trained at the USTA headquarter in Boca Raton and shared an apartment with his best friend and former vol teammate, Tennys Sandgren. He enjoys playing golf and fishing during free time. His favorite quote is "Failure to prepare is preparing to fail".

After having back surgery, Williams took up coaching in 2018 at the University of Tennessee, he then began coaching Dominik Koepfer, then in 2022 he was recruited by fellow American Zachary Svajda.

In 2020, he married fellow tennis player Olivia Rogowska.

== Equipment and sponsors ==
Williams uses a Wilson Blade and wears Adidas clothing. He also has a multi-year deal with ABN AMRO Clearing and writes a weekly blog documenting his progress on their website.

== Career ==
=== Junior tennis ===
Rhyne was coached by his grandfather, but he went on to train under the USTA Player's Development Program after winning the Junior Orange Bowl 14s. He was a Top 10 Junior in the world (Career High No.8).

Junior Achievements in Singles
2008 US Open Junior Tennis Championships Quarterfinalist
2007 Easter Bowl Champion
2007 USTA International Spring Championships Finalist
2006 Jerry Simmons ITF Junior Circuit – South Carolina Champion

Junior Achievements in Doubles
2007 Yucatán World Cup Doubles Champion with Ričardas Berankis
2007 USTA International Spring Championships Finalist with Ryan Lipman
2006 Jerry Simmons ITF Junior Circuit – College Station, Texas Champion with Devin Britton
2006 Costa Rica Bowl Champion with Blake Davis
2005 Chanda Rubin American Junior Tennis Classic – Georgia Finalist with Devin Britton

Rhyne won the USA F16 in Pittsburgh in 2007 at the age of 16 years and 3 months, which made him the youngest U.S. male to win an ITF Men's Circuit event in the United States (however, stats for this are held since 1998). After winning the title, he focused on the pro circuit and didn't play any junior event in 2008 until the US Open Junior Tennis Championships (last junior tournament of his career).

Past coaches include Michelle DePalmer-Williams, Mike DePalmer Sr., Mike DePalmer Jr., Dustin Taylor, Andres Pedroso, Martin Van Daalen.

Since claiming his 1st futures title in 2007, Williams couldn't handle the pressure of turning pro and decided to go to college, "I guess the main reason I went to school was to mature," he recalls. "It gave me a chance to get away from the pressure. I was thinking about it and I started to kind of hating tennis for a while, and I wanted to get away from the pro tennis deal. So I went to school, matured, and started enjoying tennis again."

=== College ===
Williams played two years of college tennis for his hometown Tennessee Volunteers in Knoxville, Tennessee, under head coach Sam Winterbotham and associate head coach Chris Woodruff. He enjoyed one of the best two seasons of any player in program history with accomplishments including: All-America honors in 2010 and 2011, earning the No. 1 national singles ranking in 2011 and reaching the 2011 NCAA Singles Championships. He finished his career with an 83–17 singles and 66–14 doubles record.

With his family history, Williams was a sensible fit to the Tennessee program. His grandfather, Mike DePalmer Sr., is the most successful head coach in Volunteer history, and his mother and uncle were both All-Americans in Knoxville. He started out his career with a splash, earning 2010 Southeastern Conference Freshman of the Year honors and helping the team to the NCAA finals. He became one of the top singles players in the country as a sophomore in 2010–11. He defeated Steve Johnson of the University of Southern California in the finals of the 2010 USTA/ITA National Intercollegiate Indoor Championships to become the third Tennessee player in program history to win the event. The victory boosted Williams to No. 1 nationally in the ITA singles rankings the following January. Williams played at the No. 1 and 2 singles positions during the team season and played doubles with fellow Tennessee native Tennys Sandgren. He concluded his college career by reaching the final of the 2011 NCAA Singles Championship, this time losing to Johnson in three sets.

=== Early professional ===
Williams played in his first Futures tournament in 2006, and won his first tournament in Pittsburgh in July 2007, aged just 16. His reached 782 in the ATP rankings in November 2007, a position he would not better until August 2010. He entered his first tournament at the ATP Challenger level at the Fifth Third Bank Tennis Championships in 2008, but competed mainly in Futures tournaments until 2011. During this time, Williams struggled with his weight. He won his second Futures competition in June 2011, at Innisbruck, Florida. The second half of 2011 saw Williams compete more regularly at the Challenger Tour, and in the qualifying for the 2011 US Open. He ended the year ranked 510.

=== 2012 ===
2012 was Williams's breakout year. In March 2012 he was a surprise qualifier for the 2012 Indian Wells Masters, taking a set from world number 86 Frederico Gil in his first ATP World Tour level match. He subsequently made two quarter-finals in Challenger tournaments, entering the top 300 for the first time. His next major success came in qualifying for the 2012 US Open, his first appearance at Grand Slam level. Here, Rhyne lost to former champion and 20th seed Andy Roddick in straight sets. He achieved his best result in a Challenger tournament at the end of the season, reaching the semi-finals at the JSM Challenger, ensuring that he would end the year ranked in the world top 200. His final tournament of 2012 saw him obtain qualification for the 2013 Australian Open.

=== 2013 ===
Winning the Australian Open Wildcard Playoff, Williams qualified to the main draw of the Australian Open. However, he lost to the 25th seed Florian Mayer 6–2, 6–3, 2–6, 6–7^{(12–14)}, 1–6. Next, Williams reached the second round of the Maui Challenger. In the same tournament for doubles, Williams partnered with former college partner Tennys Sandgren, and they reached the finals before losing a third-set super-tie breaker. Williams then played in the Dallas Challenger, and won his first challenger tournament defeating Robby Ginepri in the finals. Williams gained 100 points and had defeated Austin Krajicek, Rajeev Ram, Alex Kuznetsov, and Frank Dancevic on his way to the finals. In the same tournament for doubles, Williams partnered once again with Sandgren, and they reached the finals before once again losing a third-set super-tie breaker. In the U.S. National Indoor Championships, Williams won two qualifying matches to reach the main draw. In the first round, Williams gained his first ATP win over former college rival, Steve Johnson, defeating him 7–6^{(7–4)}, 6–4. In the second round, Williams fell to 7th seed Alexandr Dolgopolov 4–6, 6–4, 4–6. Williams gained 65 points from this tournament, therefore reaching a career high ranking of 133, as well as attaining a career record of 1–4. Williams made his first career ATP semifinal at the U.S. Men's Clay Court Championships in Houston, defeating Pella Guido, Ivo Karolvic, and Ruben Ramirez Hidalgo before falling to World No. 12, Nicolas Almagro. He earned entry into the main draw of the 2013 French Open as a "Lucky Loser." Williams entered the tournament ranked a career-high 117th in the ATP. Williams lost in his French Open debut and FQR of 2013 Wimbledon (his first grass season). Williams made his first ATP Doubles Final partnering Tim Smyczek at Hall of Fame Tennis Championships. Williams struggled with shoulder injury and didn't fare well in the USO summer hardcourt swing. He received a wildcard into the 2013 US Open and lost in the 1st round to Nikolay Davydenko despite having a double-break lead in the 4th set 3–6, 6–4, 6–1, 5–7, 0–6.

=== 2014 ===
Williams qualified for the 2014 Australian Open. In the main draw, he lost against fifth seed Juan Martín del Potro, winning the first set.

== ATP career finals ==
=== Doubles: 1 (1 runner-up) ===
Legend Grand Slam Tournaments (0–0) ATP World Tour Finals (0–0) ATP World Tour Masters 1000 (0–0) ATP World Tour 500 Series (0–0) ATP World Tour 250 Series (0–1)	Titles by surface Hard (0–0) Clay (0–0) Grass (0–1) Carpet (0–0)

Result	W–L	Date	Tournament	Tier	Surface	Partner	Opponents	Score
Loss	0–1	Jul 2013	Campbell's Hall of Fame Tennis Championships, United States	250 Series	Grass	(United States) Tim Smyczek	(France) Nicolas Mahut (France) Édouard Roger-Vasselin	7–6^{(7–4)}, 2–6, [5–10]

== Singles performance timeline ==
Key
W	F	SF	QF	#R	RR	Q#	DNQ	A	NH

(W) winner; (F) finalist; (SF) semifinalist; (QF) quarterfinalist; (#R) rounds 4, 3, 2, 1; (RR) round-robin stage; (Q#) qualification round; (DNQ) did not qualify; (A) absent; (NH) not held; (SR) strike rate (events won / competed); (W–L) win–loss record.

Tournament	2012	2013	2014	2015	W–L
Grand Slam tournaments
Australian Open	A	1R	1R	Q1	0–2
French Open	A	1R	A	A	0–1
Wimbledon	A	Q3	Q2		0–0
US Open	1R	1R	Q2		0–2
Win–loss	0–1	0–3	0–1	0–0	0–5
ATP World Tour Masters 1000
Indian Wells Masters	1R	Q1	1R		0–2
Miami Masters	A	1R	Q1		0–1
Monte Carlo Masters	A	A	A		0–0
Rome Masters	A	A	A		0–0
Madrid Masters	A	A	A		0–0
Canada Masters	A	A	A		0–0
Cincinnati Masters	A	A	A		0–0
Paris Masters	A	A	A		0–0
Win–loss	0–1	0–1	0–1	0–0	0–3
Career statistics
Tournaments played	2	11	4	0	17
Titles–Finals	0–0	0–0	0–0	0–0	0–0
Overall win–loss	0–2	5–11	2–4	0–0	7–17
Year-end ranking	190	130	221		
