= 2012 SAP Open =

- Date: February 13–19
- Edition: 124th
- Category: World Tour 250
- Draw: 28S / 16D
- Prize money: $531,000
- Surface: Hard / indoor
- Location: San Jose, California, U.S.
- Venue: HP Pavilion

Champions

Singles
- (Canada) Milos Raonic

Doubles
- (The Bahamas) Mark Knowles / (Belgium) Xavier Malisse
← 2011 ·	Pacific Coast Championships	· 2013 →

The 2012 SAP Open was a tennis tournament played on indoor hard courts. It was the 124th edition of the SAP Open, and was part of the ATP World Tour 250 series of the 2012 ATP World Tour. It took place at the HP Pavilion in San Jose, California, United States, from February 13 through February 19, 2012. Third-seeded Milos Raonic won the singles title.

== Singles main draw entrants ==
=== Seeds ===
Country	Player	Ranking^{1}	Seeding
FRA	Gaël Monfils	13	1
USA	Andy Roddick	19	2
CAN	Milos Raonic	29	3
CZE	Radek Štěpánek	30	4
RSA	Kevin Anderson	37	5
FRA	Julien Benneteau	35	6
USA	Donald Young	39	7
BEL	Olivier Rochus	50	8

- ^{1} Rankings as of February 6, 2012

=== Other entrants ===
The following players received wildcards into the main draw:

- (United States) Robby Ginepri
- (United States) Steve Johnson
- (United States) Jack Sock

The following players received entry from the qualifying draw:

- (United States) Denis Kudla
- (Bulgaria) Dimitar Kutrovsky
- (United States) Dennis Lajola
- (United States) Tim Smyczek

=== Withdrawals ===
- (France) Gaël Monfils (knee injury)

== Doubles main draw entrants ==
=== Seeds ===
Country	Player	Country	Player	Rank^{1}	Seed
MEX	Santiago González	GER	Christopher Kas	42	1
USA	Scott Lipsky	USA	Rajeev Ram	66	2
AUS	Paul Hanley	GBR	Jamie Murray	84	3
BAH	Mark Knowles	BEL	Xavier Malisse	92	4

- Rankings are as of February 6, 2012

=== Other entrants ===
The following pairs received wildcards into the doubles main draw:

- (United States) Sam Querrey / (United States) Jack Sock
- (United States) Robby Ginepri / (United States) Travis Rettenmaier

== Finals ==
=== Singles ===
(Canada) Milos Raonic defeated (Uzbekistan) Denis Istomin, 7–6^{(7–3)}, 6–2

- It was Raonic's 2nd title of the year and 3rd of his career. He successfully defended his title.

=== Doubles ===
(The Bahamas) Mark Knowles / (Belgium) Xavier Malisse defeated (South Africa) Kevin Anderson / (Germany) Frank Moser, 6–4, 1–6, [10–5]
