= 2011 SAP Open – Singles =

Singles
- 2011 SAP Open

Final
- Champion: (Canada) Milos Raonic
- Runner-up: (Spain) Fernando Verdasco
- Score: 7–6^{(7–6)}, 7–6^{(7–5)}

Details
- Draw: 32 (4Q / 3WC)
- Seeds: 8

Events
Singles	Doubles
← 2010 ·	Pacific Coast Championships	· 2012 →

Fernando Verdasco was the defending champion, but Milos Raonic defeated him in the final 7–6^{(7–6)}, 7–6^{(7–5)}.

== Seeds ==
1. (Spain) Fernando Verdasco (final)
2. (France) Gaël Monfils (semifinals, withdrew due to a left wrist injury)
3. (United States) Sam Querrey (first round)
4. (Belgium) Xavier Malisse (first round)
5. (Uzbekistan) Denis Istomin (quarterfinals)
6. (Germany) Benjamin Becker (first round)
7. (Australia) Lleyton Hewitt (quarterfinals)
8. (Japan) Kei Nishikori (second round)

== Draw ==
=== Key ===
- Q = Qualifier
- WC = Wild card
- LL = Lucky loser
- Alt = Alternate
- SE = Special exempt
- PR = Protected ranking
- ITF = ITF entry
- JE = Junior exempt
- w/o = Walkover
- r = Retired
- d = Defaulted
- SR = Special ranking

=== Finals ===
Semifinals
1	(Spain) Fernando Verdasco	6	6
PR	(Argentina) Juan Martín del Potro	4	4
(Canada) Milos Raonic	w/o
2	(France) Gaël Monfils

Final
1	(Spain) Fernando Verdasco	6^{6}	6^{5}
(Canada) Milos Raonic	7	7

=== Top half ===
First round
1	(Spain) F Verdasco	6	6
WC	(United States) R Ram	3	2
(United States) R Sweeting	4	4
(Croatia) I Karlović	6	6
(United States) M Russell	6	6
Q	(United States) A Kuznetsov	4	2
Q	(Moldova) R Borvanov	3	5
5	(Uzbekistan) D Istomin	6	7
3	(United States) S Querrey	6^{6}	3
(Slovakia) L Lacko	7	6
(Russia) T Gabashvili	3	2
PR	(Argentina) JM del Potro	6	6
(Argentina) B Dabul	6	6
(Colombia) A Falla	4	3
(Germany) B Phau	3	3
7	(Australia) L Hewitt	6	6

Second round
1	(Spain) F Verdasco	7	7
(Croatia) I Karlović	5	5
(United States) M Russell	6^{7}	6^{4}
5	(Uzbekistan) D Istomin	7	7
(Slovakia) L Lacko	1	6^{1}
PR	(Argentina) JM del Potro	6	7
(Argentina) B Dabul	6	5	3
7	(Australia) L Hewitt	3	7	6

Quarterfinals
1	(Spain) F Verdasco	6	6
5	(Uzbekistan) D Istomin	4	4
PR	(Argentina) JM del Potro	6	6
7	(Australia) L Hewitt	2	3

Semifinals
1	(Spain) F Verdasco	6	6
PR	(Argentina) JM del Potro	4	4

=== Bottom half ===
First round
6	(Germany) B Becker	3	6^{2}
(Lithuania) R Berankis	6	7
(Germany) D Brown	6^{2}	4
(United States) D Young	7	6
Q	(United States) J Levine	5	1
(United States) J Blake	7	6
(Canada) M Raonic	6	6
4	(Belgium) X Malisse	3	4
8	(Japan) K Nishikori	6	7
(Czech Republic) J Hájek	1	6^{6}
Q	(Colombia) R Farah	5	6	3
WC	(United States) T Smyczek	7	3	6
(United States) R Kendrick	7	3	6
(Russia) I Kunitsyn	5	6	4
WC	(United States) B Klahn	3	2
2	(France) G Monfils	6	6

Second round
(Lithuania) R Berankis	6	5	7
(United States) D Young	4	7	5
(United States) J Blake	2	6^{4}
(Canada) M Raonic	6	7
8	(Japan) K Nishikori	4	6	1
WC	(United States) T Smyczek	6	3	6
(United States) R Kendrick	2	7	4
2	(France) G Monfils	6	5	6

Quarterfinals
(Lithuania) R Berankis	4	6^{2}
(Canada) M Raonic	6	7
WC	(United States) T Smyczek	4	6^{6}
2	(France) G Monfils	6	7

Semifinals
(Canada) M Raonic	w/o
2	(France) G Monfils
