= 2011 SAP Open =

- Date: February 7–13
- Edition: 123rd
- Category: World Tour 250
- Draw: 32S / 16D
- Prize money: $531,000
- Surface: Hard / indoor
- Location: San Jose, California, U.S.
- Venue: HP Pavilion

Champions

Singles
- (Canada) Milos Raonic

Doubles
- (United States) Scott Lipsky / (United States) Rajeev Ram
← 2010 ·	Pacific Coast Championships	· 2012 →

The 2011 SAP Open was a tennis tournament played on indoor hard courts. It was the 123rd edition of the SAP Open, and was part of the ATP World Tour 250 series of the 2011 ATP World Tour. It took place at the HP Pavilion in San Jose, California, United States, from February 7 through February 13, 2011.

On the opening night of the event, Gaël Monfils defeated Pete Sampras 7–6(4), 6–4 in an exhibition match. Gaël Monfils was forced to withdraw with a left wrist injury prior to his semifinal match against Milos Raonic. Following Monfils' withdrawal, Raonic played an exhibition match against Ivo Karlović, who won the match 7–6(3), 7–6(7). Unseeded Raonic eventually faced Fernando Verdasco in the final, and went on to win his first ATP World Tour career title.

== Singles main draw entrants ==
=== Seeds ===
Country	Player	Ranking^{1}	Seeding
ESP	Fernando Verdasco	9	1
FRA	Gaël Monfils	12	2
USA	Sam Querrey	17	3
BEL	Xavier Malisse	44	4
UZB	Denis Istomin	47	5
GER	Benjamin Becker	54	6
AUS	Lleyton Hewitt	68	7
JPN	Kei Nishikori	70	8

- ^{1} Rankings as of January 31, 2011.

=== Other entrants ===
The following players received wildcards into the main draw:

- (United States) Bradley Klahn
- (United States) Rajeev Ram
- (United States) Tim Smyczek

The following players received entry from the qualifying draw:

- (Moldova) Roman Borvanov
- (Colombia) Robert Farah
- (United States) Alex Kuznetsov
- (United States) Jesse Levine

== Finals ==
=== Singles ===
(Canada) Milos Raonic defeated (Spain) Fernando Verdasco, 7–6^{(8–6)}, 7–6^{(7–5)}.

- It was Raonic's first career title. He was the first Canadian to win a title since Greg Rusedski won Seoul in 1995.

=== Doubles ===
(United States) Scott Lipsky / (United States) Rajeev Ram defeated (Colombia) Alejandro Falla / (Belgium) Xavier Malisse, 6–4, 4–6, [10–8].
