= 2010 SAP Open =

US men's tennis tournament

- Date: February 8–14
- Edition: 122nd
- Category: ATP World Tour 250
- Draw: 32S / 16D
- Prize money: $531,000
- Surface: Hard / indoors
- Location: San Jose, U.S.

Champions

Singles
- (Spain) Fernando Verdasco

Doubles
- (United States) Mardy Fish / (United States) Sam Querrey
← 2009 ·	Pacific Coast Championships	· 2011 →

The 2010 SAP Open was a men's tennis tournament played on indoor hard courts. It was the 122nd edition of the SAP Open, and was part of the ATP World Tour 250 series of the 2010 ATP World Tour. It took place at the HP Pavilion in San Jose, California, United States, from February 8 through February 14, 2010.

The singles draw featured ATP No. 7, 2010 Brisbane International champion Andy Roddick, and defending champion Radek Štěpánek. Other players included Fernando Verdasco, Tommy Haas, Mardy Fish, Sam Querrey, Tomáš Berdych and Philipp Kohlschreiber.

Fernando Verdasco and former ATP World Tour champion Pete Sampras played an exhibition match on the first day of the event. Verdasco won by the score of 6–3, 7–6(2).

== Entrants ==
=== Seeds ===
Country	Player	Ranking^{1}	Seeding
USA	Andy Roddick	7	1
ESP	Fernando Verdasco	12	2
CZE	Radek Štěpánek	14	3
GER	Tommy Haas	17	4
CZE	Tomáš Berdych	23	5
GER	Philipp Kohlschreiber	27	6
USA	Sam Querrey	30	7
FRA	Jérémy Chardy	37	8

- ^{1} Rankings as of February 1, 2010.

=== Other entrants ===
The following players received wildcards into the main draw:

- (United States) Devin Britton
- (United States) Ryan Harrison
- (Germany) Lars Pörschke

The following players received entry from the qualifying draw:

- (Lithuania) Ričardas Berankis
- (United States) Alex Bogomolov Jr.
- (United States) Ryler DeHeart
- (United States) Tim Smyczek

The following player received the lucky loser spot:

- (South Korea) Im Kyu-tae

== Finals ==
=== Singles ===
(Spain) Fernando Verdasco defeated (United States) Andy Roddick, 3–6, 6–4, 6–4

- It was Verdasco's first title of the year and 4th of his career.

=== Doubles ===
(United States) Mardy Fish / (United States) Sam Querrey defeated (Germany) Benjamin Becker / (Argentina) Leonardo Mayer, 7–6^{(7–3)}, 7–5
