= 2010 SAP Open – Singles =

Singles
- 2010 SAP Open

Final
- Champions: (Spain) Fernando Verdasco
- Runners-up: (United States) Andy Roddick
- Score: 3–6, 6–4, 6–4

Details
- Draw: 32 (4Q / 3WC)
- Seeds: 8

Events
Singles	Doubles
← 2009 ·	Pacific Coast Championships	· 2011 →

Radek Štěpánek was the defending champion; however, he lost to Xavier Malisse in the first round.
Fernando Verdasco won in the final 3–6, 6–4, 6–4 against Andy Roddick.

== Seeds ==
1. (United States) Andy Roddick (final)
2. (Spain) Fernando Verdasco (champion)
3. (Czech Republic) Radek Štěpánek (first round)
4. (Germany) Tommy Haas (second round)
5. (Czech Republic) Tomáš Berdych (quarterfinals)
6. (Germany) Philipp Kohlschreiber (quarterfinals)
7. (United States) Sam Querrey (semifinals)
8. (France) Jérémy Chardy (first round)

== Draw ==
=== Key ===
- Q = Qualifier
- WC = Wild card
- LL = Lucky loser
- Alt = Alternate
- SE = Special exempt
- PR = Protected ranking
- ITF = ITF entry
- JE = Junior exempt
- w/o = Walkover
- r = Retired
- d = Defaulted
- SR = Special ranking

=== Finals ===
Semifinals
1	(United States) Andy Roddick	2	7	7
7	(United States) Sam Querrey	6	6^{5}	6^{4}
(Uzbekistan) Denis Istomin	3	6	4
2	(Spain) Fernando Verdasco	6	2	6

Final
1	(United States) Andy Roddick	6	4	4
2	(Spain) Fernando Verdasco	3	6	6

=== Top half ===
First round
1	(United States) A Roddick	6	7
Q	(United States) R DeHeart	1	6^{1}
(Argentina) L Mayer	7	6
(Latvia) E Gulbis	5	4
(Finland) J Nieminen	3	6	6
WC	(Germany) L Pörschke	6	3	2
(United States) W Odesnik	1	7	5
5	(Czech Republic) T Berdych	6	6^{5}	7
3	(Czech Republic) R Štěpánek	3	4
(Belgium) X Malisse	6	6
(United States) M Russell	7	6
LL	(South Korea) KT Im	6^{6}	1
Q	(United States) A Bogomolov Jr.	4	6^{2}
(United States) T Dent	6	7
(Russia) T Gabashvili	3	2
7	(United States) S Querrey	6	6

Second round
1	(United States) A Roddick	6	6
(Argentina) L Mayer	3	2
(Finland) J Nieminen	3	2
5	(Czech Republic) T Berdych	6	6
(Belgium) X Malisse	4	5
(United States) M Russell	6	7
(United States) T Dent	4	4
7	(United States) S Querrey	6	6

Quarterfinals
1	(United States) A Roddick	7	7
5	(Czech Republic) T Berdych	6^{5}	6^{5}
(United States) M Russell	4	3
7	(United States) S Querrey	6	6

Semifinals
1	(United States) A Roddick	2	7	7
7	(United States) S Querrey	6	6^{5}	6^{4}

=== Bottom half ===
First round
6	(Germany) P Kohlschreiber	6^{7}	6	6
(United States) R Ram	7	1	3
(Israel) D Sela	7	7
(Colombia) S Giraldo	6^{2}	6^{4}
WC	(United States) R Harrison	2	5
(Uzbekistan) D Istomin	6	7
WC	(United States) D Britton	4	6^{3}
4	(Germany) T Haas	6	7
8	(France) J Chardy	3	1
(Germany) B Phau	6	6
Q	(Lithuania) R Berankis	6^{5}	6	6
(United States) R Ginepri	7	2	3
Q	(United States) T Smyczek	4	2
(Germany) B Becker	6	6
(Chinese Taipei) Y-h Lu	3	7	3
2	(Spain) F Verdasco	6	6^{6}	6

Second round
6	(Germany) P Kohlschreiber	6	6
(Israel) D Sela	2	0
(Uzbekistan) D Istomin	7	6
4	(Germany) T Haas	6^{3}	2
(Germany) B Phau	6^{5}	3
Q	(Lithuania) R Berankis	7	6
(Germany) B Becker	5	2
2	(Spain) F Verdasco	7	6

Quarterfinals
6	(Germany) P Kohlschreiber	1	6	3
(Uzbekistan) D Istomin	6	1	6
Q	(Lithuania) R Berankis	3	6^{5}
2	(Spain) F Verdasco	6	7

Semifinals
(Uzbekistan) D Istomin	3	6	4
2	(Spain) F Verdasco	6	2	6

== Qualifying ==
=== Seeds ===
1. (United States) Kevin Kim (second round)
2. (South Korea) Im Kyu-tae (qualifying competition, lucky loser)
3. (France) Vincent Millot (qualifying competition)
4. (Ecuador) Giovanni Lapentti (qualifying competition)
5. (United States) Ryler DeHeart (qualified)
6. (Colombia) Alejandro González (second round)
7. (Lithuania) Ričardas Berankis (qualified)
8. (United States) Michael McClune (second round)

=== Qualifiers ===
1. (United States) Tim Smyczek
2. (Lithuania) Ričardas Berankis
3. (Russia) Alex Bogomolov Jr.
4. (United States) Ryler DeHeart

=== Lucky loser ===
1. (South Korea) Im Kyu-tae

=== Draw ===
==== First qualifier ====
First round
(United States) Tim Smyczek	6	7^{7}
(United States) Bradley Klahn	2	6^{4}
(Sweden) Michael Ryderstedt	6	1	6
(Philippines) Cecil Mamiit	3	6	3
WC	(United States) Daniel McCall	3	3
6	(Colombia) Alejandro González	6	6

Second round
1	(United States) Kevin Kim	6^{8}	0
(United States) Tim Smyczek	7^{10}	6
(Sweden) Michael Ryderstedt	7	6
6	(Colombia) Alejandro González	5	4

Qualifying competition
(United States) Tim Smyczek	6	6
(Sweden) Michael Ryderstedt	4	4

==== Second qualifier ====
First round
(Serbia) Dušan Vemić	4	4
WC	(United States) John Paul Fruttero	6	6
(United Kingdom) Ken Skupski	2	6	1
(Finland) Harri Heliövaara	6	3	6
(Finland) Timo Nieminen	7^{7}	4	1
7	(Lithuania) Ričardas Berankis	6^{2}	6	6

Second round
2	(South Korea) Im Kyu-tae	7^{7}	6
WC	(United States) John Paul Fruttero	6^{4}	3
(Finland) Harri Heliövaara	6^{9}	4
7	(Lithuania) Ričardas Berankis	7^{11}	6

Qualifying competition
2	(South Korea) Im Kyu-tae	1	4
7	(Lithuania) Ričardas Berankis	6	6

==== Third qualifier ====
First round
3	(France) Vincent Millot	6	6
(United Kingdom) Jamie Baker	4	0
(Georgia (country)) Nikoloz Basilashvili	2	6	7
(Chinese Taipei) Chen Ti	6	3	5
(Russia) Alex Bogomolov Jr.	6	6
(United States) Nicholas Edlefsen	0	2
WC	(United States) Chris Wettengel	6	3	4
8	(United States) Michael McClune	3	6	6

Second round
3	(France) Vincent Millot	6	6
(Georgia (country)) Nikoloz Basilashvili	1	3
(Russia) Alex Bogomolov Jr.	6	6
8	(United States) Michael McClune	1	2

Qualifying competition
3	(France) Vincent Millot	0	1
(Russia) Alex Bogomolov Jr.	6	6

==== Fourth qualifier ====
First round
4	(Ecuador) Giovanni Lapentti	6	7
(India) Yuki Bhambri	4	5
WC	(United States) Jan-Michael Gambill	7^{7}	6
WC	(Australia) Brad Weston	6^{5}	3
(United Kingdom) Colin Fleming	6	6^{5}	6
(Slovenia) Luka Gregorc	3	7^{7}	3
(United States) Scoville Jenkins	3	5
5	(United States) Ryler DeHeart	6	7

Second round
4	(Ecuador) Giovanni Lapentti	6	3	6
WC	(United States) Jan-Michael Gambill	4	6	4
(United Kingdom) Colin Fleming	6	3	2
5	(United States) Ryler DeHeart	3	6	6

Qualifying competition
4	(Ecuador) Giovanni Lapentti	6	6^{7}	4
5	(United States) Ryler DeHeart	3	7^{9}	6
