= 2012 SAP Open – Doubles =

Doubles
- 2012 SAP Open

Final
- Champions: (The Bahamas) Mark Knowles (Belgium) Xavier Malisse
- Runners-up: (South Africa) Kevin Anderson (Germany) Frank Moser
- Score: 6–4, 1–6, [10–5]

Details
- Draw: 16
- Seeds: 4

Events
Singles	Doubles
← 2011 ·	Pacific Coast Championships	· 2013 →

Scott Lipsky and Rajeev Ram were the defending champions but lost in the semifinals.
Mark Knowles and Xavier Malisse defeated Kevin Anderson and Frank Moser 6–4, 1–6, [10–5] in the final.

== Seeds ==
1. (Germany) Christopher Kas / (Mexico) Santiago González (quarterfinals)
2. (United States) Scott Lipsky / (United States) Rajeev Ram (semifinals)
3. (Australia) Paul Hanley / (United Kingdom) Jamie Murray (quarterfinals)
4. (The Bahamas) Mark Knowles / (Belgium) Xavier Malisse (champions)

== Draw ==
=== Key ===
- Q = Qualifier
- WC = Wild card
- LL = Lucky loser
- Alt = Alternate
- SE = Special exempt
- PR = Protected ranking
- ITF = ITF entry
- JE = Junior exempt
- w/o = Walkover
- r = Retired
- d = Defaulted
- SR = Special ranking

=== Draw ===
First round
1	(Germany) C Kas (Mexico) S González	7^{7}	7^{7}
(Bulgaria) G Dimitrov (United States) JP Fruttero	6^{5}	6^{3}
(Luxembourg) G Müller (Belgium) O Rochus	6	7^{7}
(Australia) C Ball (Philippines) TC Huey	4	6^{3}
4	(The Bahamas) M Knowles (Belgium) X Malisse	7^{7}	1	[10]
(Russia) M Elgin (Uzbekistan) D Istomin	6^{2}	6	[7]
(United States) J Cerretani (Australia) M Ebden	6	6
WC	(United States) R Ginepri (United States) T Rettenmaier	3	3
(Czech Republic) L Dlouhý (Slovakia) I Zelenay	2	3
(South Africa) K Anderson (Germany) F Moser	6	6
(Germany) P Marx (Canada) A Shamasdin	3	6^{7}
3	(Australia) P Hanley (United Kingdom) J Murray	6	7^{9}
(Austria) J Knowle (Germany) M Kohlmann	6^{4}	6	[5]
WC	(United States) S Querrey (United States) J Sock	7^{7}	3	[10]
(France) J Benneteau (France) G Monfils	3	6^{6}
2	(United States) S Lipsky (United States) R Ram	6	7^{8}

Quarterfinals
1	(Germany) C Kas (Mexico) S González	3	4
(Luxembourg) G Müller (Belgium) O Rochus	6	6
4	(The Bahamas) M Knowles (Belgium) X Malisse	6	6
(United States) J Cerretani (Australia) M Ebden	3	2
(South Africa) K Anderson (Germany) F Moser	6	6
3	(Australia) P Hanley (United Kingdom) J Murray	1	4
WC	(United States) S Querrey (United States) J Sock	3	2
2	(United States) S Lipsky (United States) R Ram	6	6

Semifinals
(Luxembourg) G Müller (Belgium) O Rochus	6^{4}	3
4	(The Bahamas) M Knowles (Belgium) X Malisse	7^{7}	6
(South Africa) K Anderson (Germany) F Moser	7^{7}	6
2	(United States) S Lipsky (United States) R Ram	6^{5}	4

Final
4	(The Bahamas) M Knowles (Belgium) X Malisse	6	1	[10]
(South Africa) K Anderson (Germany) F Moser	4	6	[5]
