= 2010 SAP Open – Doubles =

Doubles
- 2010 SAP Open

Final
- Champions: (United States) Mardy Fish (United States) Sam Querrey
- Runners-up: (Germany) Benjamin Becker (Argentina) Leonardo Mayer
- Score: 7–6^{(7–3)}, 7–5

Details
- Draw: 16
- Seeds: 4

Events
Singles	Doubles
← 2009 ·	Pacific Coast Championships	· 2011 →

Tommy Haas and Radek Štěpánek were the defending champions, but they withdrew in the quarterfinals, before their match against Denis Istomin and Dudi Sela.
Mardy Fish and Sam Querrey won in the final 7–6^{(7–3)}, 7–5, against Benjamin Becker and Leonardo Mayer.

== Seeds ==
1. (United States) Bob Bryan / (United States) Mike Bryan (quarterfinals)
2. (United States) Eric Butorac / (United States) Rajeev Ram (semifinals)
3. (Sweden) Johan Brunström / (Netherlands Antilles) Jean-Julien Rojer (quarterfinals)
4. (United States) James Cerretani / (Germany) Michael Kohlmann (first round)

== Draw ==
=== Key ===
- Q = Qualifier
- WC = Wild card
- LL = Lucky loser
- Alt = Alternate
- SE = Special exempt
- PR = Protected ranking
- ITF = ITF entry
- JE = Junior exempt
- w/o = Walkover
- r = Retired
- d = Defaulted
- SR = Special ranking

=== Draw ===
First round
1	(United States) B Bryan (United States) M Bryan	6	6
(United Kingdom) C Fleming (United Kingdom) K Skupski	2	4
(Germany) B Becker (Argentina) L Mayer	2	7	[12]
WC	(United States) S Lipsky (United States) D Martin	6	6^{6}	[10]
4	(United States) J Cerretani (Germany) M Kohlmann	3	3
(Germany) T Haas (Czech Republic) R Štěpánek	6	6
(Uzbekistan) D Istomin (Israel) D Sela	6	3	[10]
(France) J Chardy (Finland) J Nieminen	3	6	[8]
(United States) M Fish (United States) S Querrey	6	6
WC	(United States) R Ginepri (United States) T Rettenmaier	3	4
(Czech Republic) T Berdych (Germany) P Kohlschreiber	6^{2}	2
3	(Sweden) J Brunström (Netherlands Antilles) J-J Rojer	7	6
(India) R Bopanna (South Africa) J Coetzee	1	4
(Australia) C Ball (Australia) S Huss	6	6
(United States) M Russell (Serbia) D Vemić	2	4
2	(United States) E Butorac (United States) R Ram	6	6

Quarterfinals
1	(United States) B Bryan (United States) M Bryan	6^{6}	3
(Germany) B Becker (Argentina) L Mayer	7	6
(Germany) T Haas (Czech Republic) R Štěpánek
(Uzbekistan) D Istomin (Israel) D Sela	w/o
(United States) M Fish (United States) S Querrey	7	6
3	(Sweden) J Brunström (Netherlands Antilles) J-J Rojer	6^{6}	4
(Australia) C Ball (Australia) S Huss	6^{3}	7	[5]
2	(United States) E Butorac (United States) R Ram	7	6^{8}	[10]

Semifinals
(Germany) B Becker (Argentina) L Mayer	6	7
(Uzbekistan) D Istomin (Israel) D Sela	1	6^{4}
(United States) M Fish (United States) S Querrey	7	6
2	(United States) E Butorac (United States) R Ram	6^{5}	4

Final
(Germany) B Becker (Argentina) L Mayer	6^{3}	5
(United States) M Fish (United States) S Querrey	7	7
