= 2012 SAP Open – Singles =

Singles
- 2012 SAP Open

Final
- Champion: (Canada) Milos Raonic
- Runner-up: (Uzbekistan) Denis Istomin
- Score: 7–6^{(7–3)}, 6–2

Details
- Draw: 28 (4Q / 3WC)
- Seeds: 8

Events
Singles	Doubles
- Pacific Coast Championships

The 2012 SAP Open – Singles was the main singles event of the 124th edition of the SAP Open, an ATP World Tour 250 tournament played on indoor hard courts in San Jose, California. Milos Raonic defended his title, defeating unseeded Denis Istomin in straight sets in the final.

== Seeds ==
The first four seeds received a bye into the second round.

1. (France) Gaël Monfils (withdrew due to knee injury)
2. (United States) Andy Roddick (quarterfinals)
3. (Canada) Milos Raonic (champion)
4. (Czech Republic) Radek Štěpánek (second round)
5. (South Africa) Kevin Anderson (quarterfinals)
6. (France) Julien Benneteau (semifinals)
7. (United States) Donald Young (first round)
8. (Belgium) Olivier Rochus (first round)

== Draw ==
Key

- Q = Qualifier
- WC = Wild card
- LL = Lucky loser
- Alt = Alternate
- ITF = ITF entry
- PR = Protected ranking
- SR = Special ranking
- SE = Special exempt
- JE = Junior exempt
- JR = Junior Accelerator Programme entrant
- CO = College Accelerator Programme entrant
- NG = Next Gen Accelerator Program entrant
- w/o = Walkover
- r = Retired
- d = Defaulted

=== Finals ===
Semifinals
(United States) Ryan Harrison	6^{4}	2
3	(Canada) Milos Raonic	7^{7}	6
6	(France) Julien Benneteau	3	7^{7}	3
(Uzbekistan) Denis Istomin	6	6^{4}	6

Final
3	(Canada) Milos Raonic	7^{7}	6
(Uzbekistan) Denis Istomin	6^{3}	2

=== Top half ===
First round
Q	(Bulgaria) D Kutrovsky	6^{7}	6	7^{7}
Q	(United States) D Lajola	7^{9}	3	6^{3}
WC	(United States) R Ginepri	6	6
(Belgium) X Malisse	1	2
(United States) R Harrison	4	6	6
8	(Belgium) O Rochus	6	2	3
(South Africa) I van der Merwe	3	3
(Germany) T Kamke	6	6
(Australia) M Ebden	6^{7}	6	7^{7}
(Israel) D Sela	7^{9}	2	6^{1}
(Bulgaria) G Dimitrov	6	6^{5}	6^{3}
5	(South Africa) K Anderson	2	7^{7}	7^{7}

Second round
LL	(United States) B Strode	5	3
Q	(Bulgaria) D Kutrovsky	7	6
WC	(United States) R Ginepri	3	6	6^{0}
(United States) R Harrison	6	2	7^{7}
3	(Canada) M Raonic	6	7^{9}
(Germany) T Kamke	2	6^{7}
(Australia) M Ebden	1	2
5	(South Africa) K Anderson	6	6

Quarterfinals
Q	(Bulgaria) D Kutrovsky	1	4
(United States) R Harrison	6	6
3	(Canada) M Raonic	7	7^{7}
5	(South Africa) K Anderson	5	6^{3}

Semifinals
(United States) R Harrison	6^{4}	2
3	(Canada) M Raonic	7^{7}	6

=== Bottom half ===
First round
6	(France) J Benneteau	7^{7}	7^{7}
(United States) R Sweeting	6^{3}	6^{5}
(Luxembourg) G Müller	2	7^{7}	6
Q	(United States) T Smyczek	6	6^{5}	3
WC	(United States) S Johnson	6^{4}	6^{5}
(Belgium) S Darcis	7^{7}	7^{7}
7	(United States) D Young	1	6^{6}
(United States) M Russell	6	7^{8}
(Uzbekistan) D Istomin	5	6	7
(United States) S Querrey	7	3	5
WC	(United States) J Sock	4	7^{8}	3
Q	(United States) D Kudla	6	6^{6}	6

Second round
6	(France) J Benneteau	6	6
(Luxembourg) G Müller	2	4
(Belgium) S Darcis	7^{7}	7^{7}
4	(Czech Republic) R Štěpánek	6^{4}	6^{2}
(United States) M Russell	2	2
(Uzbekistan) D Istomin	6	6
Q	(United States) D Kudla	7^{7}	6^{5}	4
2	(United States) A Roddick	6^{5}	7^{7}	6

Quarterfinals
6	(France) J Benneteau	3	6	6
(Belgium) S Darcis	6	1	2
(Uzbekistan) D Istomin	6	6
2	(United States) A Roddick	2	4

Semifinals
6	(France) J Benneteau	3	7^{7}	3
(Uzbekistan) D Istomin	6	6^{4}	6

== Qualifying ==
=== Seeds ===
1. (United States) Rajeev Ram (second round)
2. (Lithuania) Ričardas Berankis (qualifying competition, retired)
3. (United States) Michael Yani (second round, retired due to a back injury)
4. (United States) Denis Kudla (qualified)
5. (Canada) Pierre-Ludovic Duclos (first round)
6. (Colombia) Carlos Salamanca (first round)
7. (Germany) Andre Begemann (first round)
8. (United States) Tim Smyczek (qualified)

=== Qualifiers ===
1. (United States) Dennis Lajola
2. (United States) Tim Smyczek
3. (Bulgaria) Dimitar Kutrovsky
4. (United States) Denis Kudla

=== Draw ===
==== First qualifier ====
First round
1	(United States) Rajeev Ram	6	6
(United States) Chris Wettengel	3	2
WC	(Brazil) Pedro Zerbini	2	4
(United States) Dennis Lajola	6	6
(South Africa) Fritz Wolmarans	7^{7}	7^{7}
(France) Antoine Benneteau	6^{4}	6^{5}
(India) Yuki Bhambri	6	1	7^{7}
5	(Canada) Pierre-Ludovic Duclos	4	6	6^{4}

Second round
1	(United States) Rajeev Ram	4	6^{4}
(United States) Dennis Lajola	6	7^{7}
(South Africa) Fritz Wolmarans	2	4
(India) Yuki Bhambri	6	6

Qualifying competition
(United States) Dennis Lajola	6	6
(India) Yuki Bhambri	4	4

==== Second qualifier ====
First round
2	(Lithuania) Ričardas Berankis	6	6
WC	(United States) Jeff Gast	4	1
(United States) Kevin Kim	5	7^{7}	6
(France) Clément Reix	7	6^{4}	1
(Australia) Carsten Ball	7^{7}	6
(United States) Greg Ouellette	6^{3}	3
(Czech Republic) Lukáš Dlouhý	1	6^{1}
8	(United States) Tim Smyczek	6	7^{7}

Second round
2	(Lithuania) Ričardas Berankis	6	6^{5}	6
(United States) Kevin Kim	2	7^{7}	4
(Australia) Carsten Ball	1	2
8	(United States) Tim Smyczek	6	6

Qualifying competition
2	(Lithuania) Ričardas Berankis	3	2^{r}
8	(United States) Tim Smyczek	6	4

==== Third qualifier ====
First round
3	(United States) Michael Yani	6	3	6
(United States) Michael McClune	3	6	3
(Zimbabwe) Takanyi Garanganga	4	5
(Bulgaria) Dimitar Kutrovsky	6	7
(Slovenia) Luka Gregorc	6	6
(Germany) Frank Moser	4	3
(United Kingdom) Daniel Cox	6^{2}	6	6
6	(Colombia) Carlos Salamanca	7^{7}	4	3

Second round
3	(United States) Michael Yani	5	1^{r}
(Bulgaria) Dimitar Kutrovsky	7	0
(Slovenia) Luka Gregorc	6	6^{4}	7^{7}
(United Kingdom) Daniel Cox	3	7^{7}	6^{5}

Qualifying competition
(Bulgaria) Dimitar Kutrovsky	6	6
(Slovenia) Luka Gregorc	2	0

==== Fourth qualifier ====
First round
4	(United States) Denis Kudla	6	6
WC	(United States) Dennis Novikov	3	4
(United States) Phillip Simmonds	7	6
WC	(United States) Nicholas Edlefsen	5	4
(United States) Travis Rettenmaier	4	6	3
(Brazil) Clayton Almeida	6	1	6
(United States) Blake Strode	6	3	7
7	(Germany) Andre Begemann	3	6	5

Second round
4	(United States) Denis Kudla	7	6
(United States) Phillip Simmonds	5	3
(Brazil) Clayton Almeida	4	0
(United States) Blake Strode	6	6

Qualifying competition
4	(United States) Denis Kudla	6	6^{7}	6
(United States) Blake Strode	4	7^{9}	4
