= 2011 SAP Open – Doubles =

Doubles
- 2011 SAP Open

Final
- Champions: (United States) Scott Lipsky (United States) Rajeev Ram
- Runners-up: (Colombia) Alejandro Falla (Belgium) Xavier Malisse
- Score: 6–4, 4–6, [10–8]

Details
- Draw: 16
- Seeds: 4

Events
Singles	Doubles
← 2010 ·	Pacific Coast Championships	· 2012 →

Mardy Fish and Sam Querrey were the defending champions, but Fish chose not to compete.
Querrey decided to play with Juan Martín del Potro, but lost in the quarterfinals to Mark Knowles and Michal Mertiňák.
Scott Lipsky and Rajeev Ram won in the final, 6–4, 4–6, [10–8], against Alejandro Falla and Xavier Malisse.

== Seeds ==
1. (The Bahamas) Mark Knowles / (Slovakia) Michal Mertiňák (semifinals)
2. (United States) Eric Butorac / (Curaçao) Jean-Julien Rojer (quarterfinals)
3. (Germany) Dustin Brown / (Netherlands) Rogier Wassen (first round)
4. (Mexico) Santiago González / (Germany) Philipp Marx (semifinals)

== Draw ==
Key

- Q = Qualifier
- WC = Wild card
- LL = Lucky loser
- Alt = Alternate
- ITF = ITF entry
- PR = Protected ranking
- SR = Special ranking
- SE = Special exempt
- JE = Junior exempt
- JR = Junior Accelerator Programme entrant
- CO = College Accelerator Programme entrant
- NG = Next Gen Accelerator Program entrant
- w/o = Walkover
- r = Retired
- d = Defaulted

=== Draw ===
First round
1	(The Bahamas) M Knowles (Slovakia) M Mertiňák	6^{4}	6	[10]
(Germany) B Becker (Germany) M Kohlmann	7	4	[4]
(Argentina) JM del Potro (United States) S Querrey	6	7
(Germany) C Kas (Austria) A Peya	3	6^{5}
3	(Germany) D Brown (Netherlands) R Wassen	3	7	[5]
WC	(United States) B Klahn (United States) R Thacher	6	6^{6}	[10]
(Colombia) A Falla (Belgium) X Malisse	6	6
(Croatia) I Karlović (Serbia) D Vemić	1	2
(Lithuania) R Berankis (Japan) K Nishikori	6^{4}	6	[10]
(Sweden) J Brunström (United States) T Parrott	7	0	[6]
WC	(United States) R Kendrick (United States) T Rettenmaier	7	3	[2]
4	(Mexico) S González (Germany) P Marx	6^{2}	6	[10]
(Russia) T Gabashvili (Uzbekistan) D Istomin	4	4
(United States) S Lipsky (United States) R Ram	6	6
(Australia) L Hewitt (Spain) F Verdasco	3	4
2	(United States) E Butorac (Curaçao) J-J Rojer	6	6

Quarterfinals
1	(The Bahamas) M Knowles (Slovakia) M Mertiňák	4	6	[10]
(Argentina) JM del Potro (United States) S Querrey	6	1	[7]
WC	(United States) B Klahn (United States) R Thacher	0	2
(Colombia) A Falla (Belgium) X Malisse	6	6
(Lithuania) R Berankis (Japan) K Nishikori	2	2
4	(Mexico) S González (Germany) P Marx	6	6
(United States) S Lipsky (United States) R Ram	7	6
2	(United States) E Butorac (Curaçao) J-J Rojer	6^{8}	3

Semifinals
1	(The Bahamas) M Knowles (Slovakia) M Mertiňák	6	5	[4]
(Colombia) A Falla (Belgium) X Malisse	4	7	[10]
4	(Mexico) S González (Germany) P Marx	5	3
(United States) S Lipsky (United States) R Ram	7	6

Finals
(Colombia) A Falla (Belgium) X Malisse	4	6	[8]
(United States) S Lipsky (United States) R Ram	6	4	[10]
