= Dimitar Kutrovsky =

Bulgarian tennis player

Dimitar Kutrovsky Димитър Кутровски
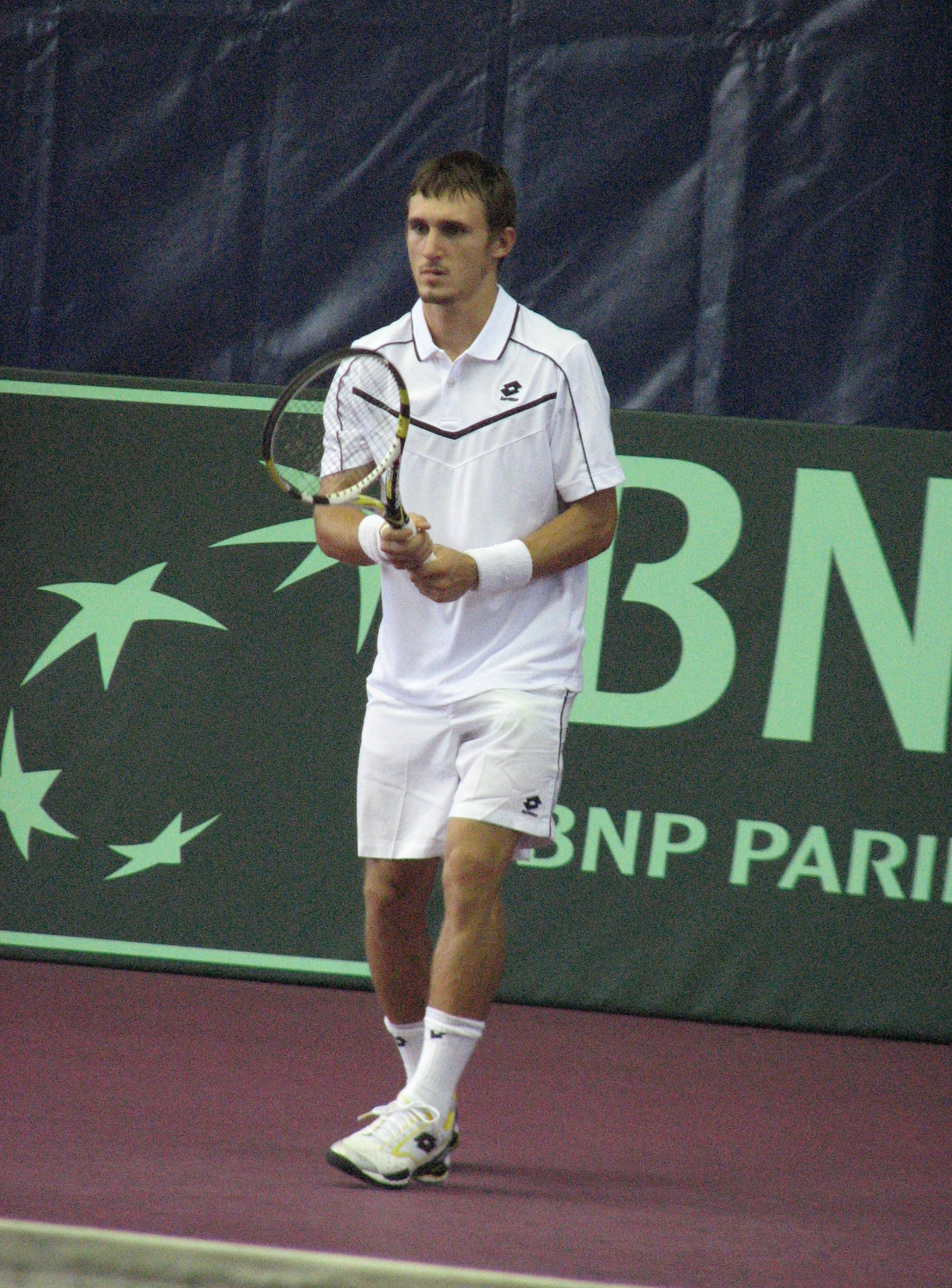
- Dimitar Kutrovsky at the 2011 Davis Cup
- Country (sports): Bulgaria
- Residence: Austin, TX, United States
- Born: 27 August 1987 (age 39) Sofia, Bulgaria
- Height: 1.75 m (5 ft 9 in)
- Turned pro: 2005
- Retired: 2016
- Plays: Right-handed (two-handed both sides)
- Prize money: US$ 78,795

Singles
- Career record: 8–5 (at ATP Tour level, Grand Slam level, and in Davis Cup)
- Career titles: 0
- Highest ranking: No. 293 (18 May 2015)

Doubles
- Career record: 2–2 (at ATP Tour level, Grand Slam level, and in Davis Cup)
- Career titles: 0
- Highest ranking: No. 234 (10 August 2015)
- Last updated on: 30 January 2021.

Dimitar Kutrovsky (Bulgarian: Димитър Кутровски; born 27 August 1987) is a retired tennis player from Bulgaria. On 18 May 2015, he reached his highest ATP singles ranking of 293 whilst his best doubles ranking was 234 on 10 August 2015.

As a junior, he played for CSKA. In 2003 he was No.28 in the rankings of the European Tennis Association for boys under 16 years old. In 2005 he reached No.69 in the ITF's rankings for boys under 18 years old. He is also a doubles champion from the Indoor national championships in 2008, where he was partnering with Martin Shishkov.

He graduated his secondary education in the sport school "General Vladimir Stoychev" in Sofia. After that he also finished his higher education in the University of Texas at Austin, where he played for the American College championships (NCAA). With his 230 wins in singles and doubles, he became the best tennis player in the history of the university. From 2008 to 2010 he was a three-times winner of the annual award "All-American" in singles, which is given to the tennis players with the best results in USA.

After graduating in 2010 Kutrovsky started playing actively in ITF Futures and ATP Challenger tournaments. In singles he played four finals of ITF Futures tournaments and he won one of them. In 2012 he played his second ATP tournament at the 2012 SAP Open and won five matches and reached the quarter-finals, where he lost 1–6, 4–6 to Ryan Harrison. In doubles he has three titles and three lost finals.

After investigations of allegedly using prohibited stimulant methylhexaneamine at the 2012 SAP Open on 14 February 2012 he was found guilty by the International Tennis Federation on 15 May and retroactively banned for two years dating back from the said tournament.

On 5 October 2012 it was announced that the Court of Arbitration for Sport has partially upheld the appeal by Dimitar Kutrovsky against the decision of the independent tribunal dated 15 May 2012. The panel's decision was that the appropriate period of ineligibility should be fifteen months and the Bulgarian will be eligible to participate on 14 May 2013.

As of May 2013 Kutrovsky is back to playing after his ban expired. He reached the final of the clay-court Futures event in Varna, which was his first tournament after the ban, but there he lost 7–5, 4–6, 2–6 to Kristijan Mesaroš.

In January 2016, Kutrovsky announced his retirement from professional tennis.

== Year-end rankings ==
Year	2005	2006	2007	2008	2009	2010	2011	2012	2013	2014	2015
Singles	1231	1045	1479	1572	828	566	519	714	485	360	317
Doubles	-	1476	-	-	-	598	744	-	1487	401	342

== Challenger and Futures Finals ==
=== Singles: 11 (2–9) ===
Legend (singles) ATP Challenger Tour (0–0) ITF Futures (2–9)	Titles by surface Hard (2–7) Clay (0–2) Grass (0–0) Carpet (0–0)

Result	W–L	Date	Tournament	Tier	Surface	Opponent	Score
Loss	0–1	Oct 2009	U.S.A. F25, Austin	Futures	Hard	(United States) Michael McClune	6–7^{(5–7)}, 3–6
Loss	0–2	Jun 2010	U.S.A. F13, Loomis	Futures	Hard	(New Zealand) Michael Venus	6–7^{(4–7)}, 6–1, 3–6
Loss	0–3	Apr 2011	U.S.A. F8, Oklahoma City	Futures	Hard	(Spain) Arnau Brugués-Davi	5–7, 1–6
Win	1–3	Jan 2012	Turkey F3, Antalya	Futures	Hard	(Canada) Steven Diez	6–3, 6–0
Loss	1–4	May 2013	Bulgaria F2, Varna	Futures	Clay	(Croatia) Kristijan Mesaroš	7–5, 4–6, 2–6
Loss	1–5	Jun 2013	Bulgaria F5, Stara Zagora	Futures	Clay	(Czech Republic) Roman Jebavý	5–7, 4–6
Loss	1–6	Aug 2013	U.S.A. F21, Decatur	Futures	Hard	(United States) Eric Quigley	6–7^{(3–7)}, 4–6
Loss	1–7	Aug 2013	U.S.A. F22, Edwardsville	Futures	Hard	(United States) Jason Jung	2–6, 6–7^{(5–7)}
Loss	1–8	Mar 2014	Canada F1, Gatineau	Futures	Hard (i)	(United Kingdom) Daniel Smethurst	2–6, 3–6
Win	2–8	Mar 2014	Canada F2, Sherbrooke	Futures	Hard (i)	(United Kingdom) Edward Corrie	6–3, 4–6, 6–2
Loss	2–9	Oct 2014	U.S.A. F28, Mansfield	Futures	Hard	(United Kingdom) Liam Broady	6–1, 6–7^{(2–7)}, 0–6

=== Doubles: 15 (7–8) ===
Legend (doubles) ATP Challenger Tour (0–0) ITF Futures (7–8)	Titles by surface Hard (4–5) Clay (2–2) Grass (0–0) Carpet (1–1)

Result	W–L	Date	Tournament	Tier	Surface	Partner	Opponents	Score
Loss	0–1	Jun 2010	U.S.A. F15, Chico	Futures	Hard	(United States) Jack Sock	(Australia) Nima Roshan (New Zealand) Rubin Statham	3–6, 6–0, [8–10]
Win	1–1	Oct 2010	U.S.A. F27, Mansfield	Futures	Hard	(United States) Joshua Zavala	(United States) Andrea Collarini (United States) Denis Kudla	6–3, 6–2
Win	2–1	Nov 2010	U.S.A. F30, Pensacola	Futures	Clay	(United States) Jack Sock	(United States) Devin Britton (United States) Jordan Cox	5–7, 6–2, [10–8]
Loss	2–2	Nov 2010	U.S.A. F31, Amelia Island	Futures	Clay	(United States) Jack Sock	(Croatia) Mislav Hižak (United States) Robbye Poole	2–6, 6–7^{(3–7)}
Loss	2–3	Jan 2011	U.S.A. F3, Weston	Futures	Clay	(United States) Jack Sock	(South Korea) Cho Soong-jae (South Korea) Kim Hyun-joon	3–6, 4–6
Win	3–3	Feb 2011	U.S.A. F4, Palm Coast	Futures	Clay	(United States) Jack Sock	(United States) Blake Strode (United States) Greg Ouellette	6–3, 3–6, [10–8]
Win	4–3	Jan 2014	Germany F1, Schwieberdingen	Futures	Carpet (i)	(Sweden) Jacob Adaktusson	(Poland) Błażej Koniusz (Poland) Mateusz Kowalczyk	6–3, 1–6, [10–6]
Loss	4–4	Jan 2014	Germany F3, Kaarst	Futures	Carpet (i)	(Belarus) Uladzimir Ignatik	(Georgia (country)) Nikoloz Basilashvili (Belarus) Alexander Bury	6–4, 4–6, [6–10]
Loss	4–5	Aug 2014	Canada F7, Calgary	Futures	Hard	(United States) Dennis Nevolo	(Canada) Brayden Schnur (United States) Jack Murray	4–6, 6–3, [7–10]
Win	5–5	Aug 2014	Canada F8, Winnipeg	Futures	Hard	(India) Saketh Myneni	(Canada) Philip Bester (New Zealand) Marcus Daniell	7–5, 7–5
Win	6–5	Oct 2014	U.S.A. F27, Houston	Futures	Hard	(Brazil) Henrique Cunha	(United States) Jeff Dadamo (United States) Evan King	6–4, 6–4
Loss	6–6	Oct 2014	U.S.A. F28, Mansfield	Futures	Hard	(Brazil) Henrique Cunha	(United Kingdom) Liam Broady (United States) Dennis Novikov	6–4, 3–6, [7–10]
Win	7–6	Jan 2015	U.S.A. F2, Los Angeles	Futures	Hard	(United States) Dennis Novikov	(Denmark) Frederik Nielsen (Republic of Ireland) James Cluskey	4–6, 6–1, [10–4]
Loss	7–7	Jan 2015	U.S.A. F4, Long Beach	Futures	Hard	(United States) Dennis Novikov	(United States) Nicolas Meister (United States) Eric Quigley	3–6, 2–6
Loss	7–8	Apr 2015	U.S.A. F12, Harlingen	Futures	Hard	(Canada) Philip Bester	(United States) Deiton Baughman (United States) Jeremy Hunter Nicholas	3–6, 6–7^{(3–7)}

== Davis Cup ==
Dimitar Kutrovsky debuted for the Bulgaria Davis Cup team in 2011. Since then he has 6 nominations with 6 ties played, his singles W/L record is 6–4 and doubles W/L record is 2–2 (8–6 overall).

=== Singles (6–4) ===
Edition	Round	Date	Surface	Opponent	W/L	Result
2011 Europe/Africa Zone Group II	R1	4 March 2011	Hard (I)	(Belarus) Sergey Betov	W	7–5, 6–4, 2–6, 7–6^{(7–2)}
2011 Europe/Africa Zone Group II	R1	6 March 2011	Hard (I)	(Belarus) Uladzimir Ignatik	L	6–3, 2–6, 1–6, 4–6
2011 Europe/Africa Zone Group II	RPO	8 July 2011	Carpet (I)	(Cyprus) Philippos Tsangaridis	W	6–0, 6–2, 6–2
2011 Europe/Africa Zone Group II	RPO	10 July 2011	Carpet (I)	(Cyprus) Marcos Baghdatis	L	3–6, 6–3, 6–7^{(3–7)}, 5–7
2014 Europe/Africa Zone Group II	R1	31 January 2014	Hard (I)	(Finland) Micke Kontinen	W	6–4, 6–2, 6–1
2014 Europe/Africa Zone Group II	R1	2 February 2014	Hard (I)	(Finland) Jarkko Nieminen	L	6–4, 1–6, 6–2, 4–6, 3–6
2014 Europe/Africa Zone Group II	RPO	4 April 2014	Clay	(Greece) Theodoros Angelinos	W	6–4, 6–3, 1–6, 6–3
2014 Europe/Africa Zone Group II	RPO	6 April 2014	Clay	(Greece) Charalampos Kapogiannis	W	5–7, 6–0, 6–1
2015 Europe/Africa Zone Group II	R2	19 July 2015	Clay	(Luxembourg) Ugo Nastasi	W	6–4, 6–2
2015 Europe/Africa Zone Group II	PPO	18 September 2015	Clay	(Hungary) Péter Nagy	L	4–6, 0–6, 3–6

=== Doubles (2–2) ===
Edition	Round	Date	Partner	Surface	Opponents	W/L	Result
2011 Europe/Africa Zone Group II	RPO	9 July 2011	(Bulgaria) Todor Enev	Carpet (I)	(Cyprus) Marcos Baghdatis (Cyprus) Rareş Cuzdriorean	L	2–6, 2–6, 6–3, 6–4, 4–6
2014 Europe/Africa Zone Group II	R1	1 February 2014	(Bulgaria) Tihomir Grozdanov	Hard (I)	(Finland) Jarkko Nieminen (Finland) Henri Kontinen	L	3–6, 2–6, 6–3, 2–6
2014 Europe/Africa Zone Group II	RPO	5 April 2014	(Bulgaria) Grigor Dimitrov	Clay	(Greece) Alexandros Jakupovic (Greece) Markos Kalovelonis	W	7–6^{(7–4)}, 6–2, 6–4
2015 Europe/Africa Zone Group II	R2	28 July 2015	(Bulgaria) Grigor Dimitrov	Clay	(Luxembourg) Gilles Kremer (Luxembourg) Mike Scheidweiler	W	6–3, 6–4, 6–4

- RPO = Relegation Play–off
- PPO = Promotion Play–off
