= Milos Raonic =

Canadian tennis player (born 1990)

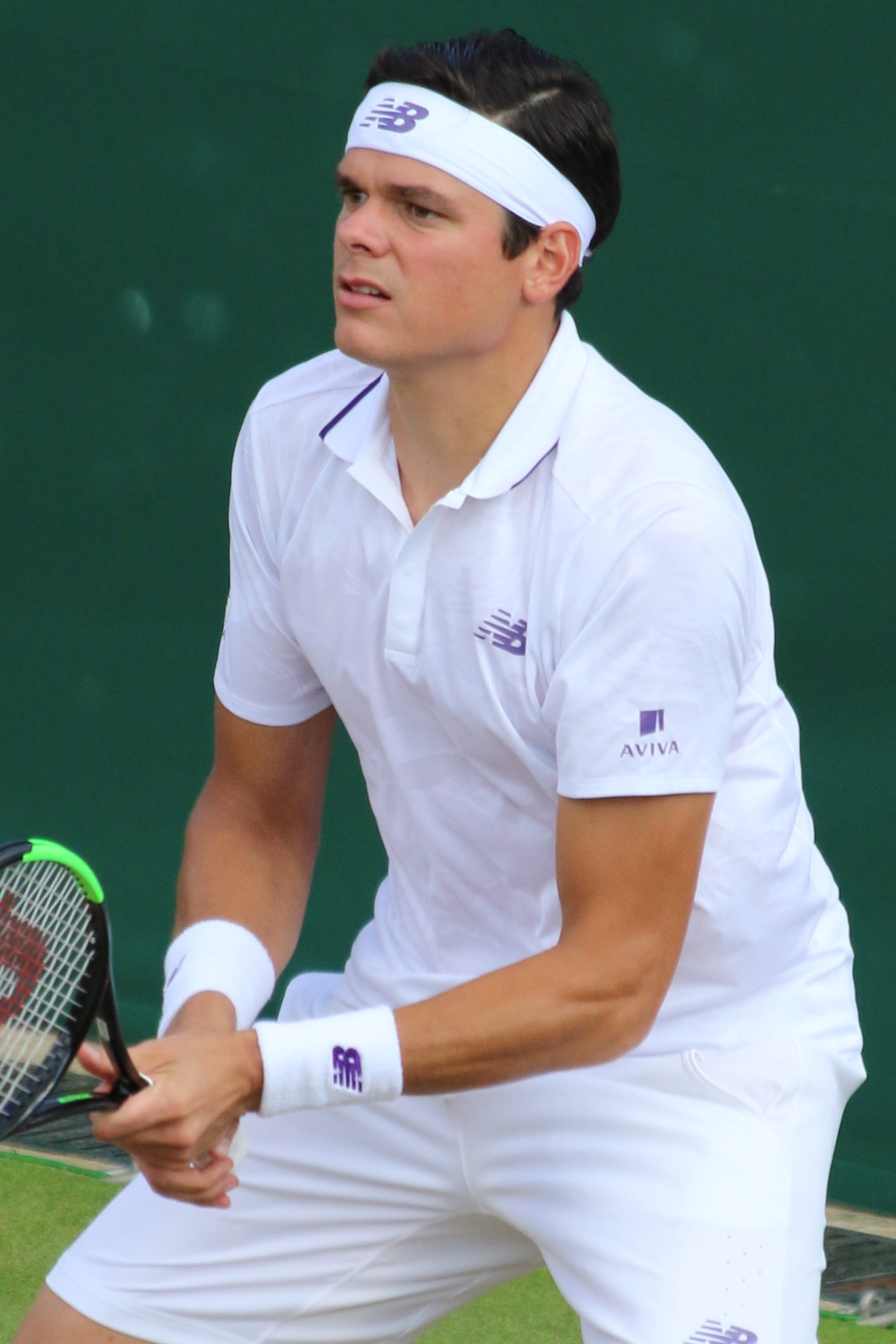
- Raonic at the 2017 Wimbledon Championships
- Native name: Милош Раонић; Miloš Raonić
- Country (sports): Canada
- Residence: Monte Carlo, Monaco
- Born: December 27, 1990 (age 35) Titograd, SR Montenegro, SFR Yugoslavia
- Height: 1.96 m (6 ft 5 in)
- Turned pro: 2008
- Retired: 2026 (last match 2024)
- Plays: Right-handed (two-handed backhand)
- Coach: Mario Tudor (2019–2024)
- Prize money: US $20,764,512: 34th all-time leader in earnings

Singles
- Career record: 383–184 (67.5%)
- Career titles: 8
- Highest ranking: No. 3 (21 November 2016)

Grand Slam singles results
- Australian Open: SF (2016)
- French Open: QF (2014)
- Wimbledon: F (2016)
- US Open: 4R (2012, 2013, 2014, 2018)

Other tournaments
- Tour Finals: SF (2016)
- Olympic Games: 2R (2012)

Doubles
- Career record: 26–36 (41.9%)
- Career titles: 0
- Highest ranking: No. 103 (10 June 2013)

Other doubles tournaments
- Olympic Games: 1R (2024)

Team competitions
- Davis Cup: SF (2013)
- Hopman Cup: RR (2014)

Milos Raonic (Serbian Cyrillic: Милош Раонић, romanized: Miloš Raonić, pronounced [mǐloʃ râonitɕ]; born December 27, 1990) is a Canadian former professional tennis player. He was ranked as high as world No. 3 in men's singles by the Association of Tennis Professionals, making him the highest-ranked Canadian in ATP history. Raonic won eight ATP Tour titles, and reached a major final at the 2016 Wimbledon Championships.

Raonic first gained widespread recognition by reaching the fourth round of the 2011 Australian Open as a qualifier. Coupled with his first ATP Tour title three weeks later, his world ranking rose from No. 152 to No. 37 in one month, and he was named the 2011 ATP Newcomer of the Year. Raonic was the first player born in the 1990s to be ranked in the top 10 and to qualify for the ATP Finals. His career highlights include his 2016 Wimbledon final, two other major semifinals at the 2014 Wimbledon Championships and 2016 Australian Open, and four Masters finals. He was the first Canadian man in the Open Era to reach the Wimbledon final, the Australian Open semifinals, and the French Open quarterfinals.

Raonic was frequently described as having one of the best serves among his contemporaries. Statistically, Raonic is one of the best servers in the Open Era, winning 91% of service games to rank (third-most of all time). Aided by his serve, he played an all-court style with an emphasis on short points. All his singles titles were won on hardcourts. His overall winning percentage of 68% was one of the highest among players of his era.

== Early and personal life ==
Raonic was born on December 27, 1990, in Titograd, SFR Yugoslavia (now Podgorica, Montenegro), and is of Serb ethnic descent. Prompted by the breakup of Yugoslavia and subsequent ethnic conflicts, and seeking more professional opportunities, his family moved to Canada in 1994 when he was three, settling in Brampton, Ontario.

His parents are both engineers; his father, Dušan, holds a Ph.D. in electrical engineering, while his mother, Vesna, has degrees in mechanical and computer engineering, including a master's. He has two older siblings: his sister, Jelena, is eleven years older, while his brother, Momir, is nine years older. Raonic's uncle, Branimir Gvozdenović, is a politician in the Government of Montenegro, where he has served as Deputy Prime Minister. Raonic is fluent in Serbian and English.

His first, brief introduction to tennis came at age six or seven with a week-long tennis camp at the Bramalea Tennis Club in Brampton, followed by weekly hour-long group sessions led by tennis coach Steve Gibson, who recognized his potential. He moved to nearby Thornhill, Ontario soon after, and one or two years passed before he asked his parents if he could play again. His father sought out coach Casey Curtis at the Blackmore Tennis Club in neighbouring Richmond Hill, Ontario. Curtis was at first reluctant to take on Raonic, but was convinced after Raonic demonstrated his commitment by working with his father and a ball machine daily for two months. Years later, Raonic said he chose tennis because of its "individuality and [because he] felt [he] could train more alone and on a ball machine with [his] dad".

Raonic and Curtis worked together "twice a day, almost every day, for the next nine years." Provided that he complete his courses, Raonic was allowed to reduce his hours of attendance at Thornhill Elementary School so that he could practise more, which he did both before and after school. His parents and siblings supported his tennis, taking turns driving him to practice and tournaments, but did not push him to it or interfere with coaching. Rather, they emphasized school throughout, insisting that he maintain academic excellence as a prerequisite to playing tennis. He attended Thornhill Secondary School, and accelerated his course load—achieving an 82 percent average—so that he could graduate a year early. Late in 2007, at the age of 16, Raonic moved to Montreal as one of the first group of players at Tennis Canada's new National Tennis Centre, thus marking the end of his formal relationship with Curtis.

Raonic's four favourite sports teams are FC Barcelona, the Toronto Blue Jays, the Toronto Maple Leafs, and the Toronto Raptors. He played in the 2016 NBA All-Star Celebrity Game held in Toronto.

He worked for Rogers Sportsnet as an analyst while recovering from injury for their broadcast of the 2011 Canadian Open. In November 2011, Raonic won an exhibition match against his childhood idol, Pete Sampras, which was dubbed "The Face Off." In 2012, he took up residence in Monte Carlo, Monaco in a 50 metre^{2} (538 sq ft) apartment, located minutes away from the Monte Carlo Country Club—his "home" tennis club and the site of the Monte-Carlo Masters tournament—and Stade Louis II, which he uses for off-court training. Raonic was in a relationship with Canadian model Danielle Knudson. In April 2022 Raonic married Belgian model Camille Ringoir in Italy.

== Career ==
=== Amateur career ===
Raonic first competed at a junior event sanctioned by the International Tennis Federation (ITF) in October 2003 at the age of 12. Milos partnered fellow Canadian Cameron Chiang and made it to the finals of the Benjamin Open in Bordeaux, France. Two years later, in October 2005, he picked up his first singles match victory at age 14. His first juniors titles in both singles and doubles came at the same Grade 4 tournament in October 2006. Later that year, he won the Prince Cup doubles title, partnering fellow Canadian Vasek Pospisil for the first time at an ITF event. Pospisil and Raonic partnered at four more junior tournaments, including the 2008 Wimbledon Championships and the 2008 French Open, reaching the semifinals in the latter. His most notable titles as a junior were in doubles, winning two Grade 1 events in 2008 partnered with Bradley Klahn.

Over five years, Raonic compiled a 53–30 win–loss record in singles, and a 56–24 record in doubles on the ITF Junior Circuit. Except for reaching the semifinals at the 2008 French Open in doubles, Raonic did not advance past the second round of junior Grand Slam events. His career-high combined junior ranking, which considers both singles and doubles results, was No. 35.

While an amateur, Raonic played in fourteen professional tournaments against adults in North America: ten ITF Futures events at the bottom tier of professional tennis; three ATP Challenger Tour events at the middle tier; and one ATP World Tour event at the top tier. He played his first professional circuit match in the qualifying draw of an ITF Futures tournament in Toronto in October 2005 at the age of 14; he won his first professional circuit main draw match at an ITF Futures tournament in Gatineau, Quebec, in March 2007 against Fabrice Martin. With the win, Raonic earned his first world ranking of No. 1518. He played his first professional circuit doubles match at the same tournament, partnered with Pospisil again. Raonic lost his first ATP Challenger Tour match in Granby, Quebec, in July 2007 against Gary Lugassy. Raonic won his first ITF Futures doubles title in Gatineau, Quebec in March 2008, and reached his first ITF Futures singles final two weeks later in Sherbrooke, Quebec. He received a wildcard to the qualifying tournament of the 2008 Canadian Open, but lost in the first round to Alexander Kudryavtsev. The match was his first in the ATP World Tour.

By the summer of 2008, Raonic had received scholarship offers from several colleges, including the University of Michigan, Princeton, and Northwestern University, and committed to play for the University of Virginia that fall while studying finance. Just two weeks before school started, he consulted his parents about his plan to turn professional instead. Raonic and his parents agreed that he would take correspondence courses in finance from Athabasca University while starting a professional tennis career, setting a deadline of two years for reaching the top 100. During that summer, his world ranking ranged between No. 915 and No. 937. Raonic reached the top 100 in January 2011, around five months later than the target deadline. He thus turned down the scholarships and turned professional, agreeing to be represented by the sports agency SFX. University of Virginia men's tennis coach Brian Boland later commented that "I have only seen two guys turn down scholarships and then succeed quickly on the Tour: Sam Querrey and Milos Raonic."

=== 2008–2010: Early professional years ===
After turning professional in September 2008 until the end of 2010, Raonic played both singles and doubles, primarily at ITF Futures and ATP Challenger tournaments. He won his first ITF Futures singles title in March 2009 in Montreal. He added three more singles titles and five doubles titles at the ITF Futures level in 2009 and 2010. He was less successful at the ATP Challenger level, tallying only one title. In his fourth tournament after turning professional, Raonic won the doubles title at the Men's Rimouski Challenger in November 2008, partnered with Pospisil.

At the ATP World Tour level, Raonic gained entry into few tournaments, compiling a main draw record of three wins and five losses over nearly two and half years. In 2009, Raonic again received a wildcard for the qualifying tournament of the Canadian Open. This time, he beat No. 77 Teymuraz Gabashvili and No. 113 Michaël Llodra to qualify for the main draw of an ATP World Tour tournament for the first time. In the first round, he held a match point, but lost to No. 10 Fernando González in three sets. The matches against Gabashvili and González were the first singles matches for Raonic against a top 100 player and top 10 player, respectively.

A year later, at the 2010 Canadian Open, Raonic and Pospisil were given a doubles wildcard to the main draw, marking Raonic's first ever ATP World Tour doubles match. They won their first round match against Rafael Nadal and Novak Djokovic. It was first time that the world Nos. 1 and 2 had played together in a tour doubles match since Jimmy Connors and Arthur Ashe did so in 1976. In the second round, Raonic and Pospisil lost to reigning Wimbledon doubles champions Jürgen Melzer and Philipp Petzschner. After the match, Raonic said: "Our goal here is pretty much as ambassadors to Canada. The more players that we can get to come, the more people we can get going to take tennis lessons."

Less than a month later, Raonic gained entry into a Grand Slam tournament for the first time at the 2010 US Open. He qualified for the main draw, but lost in the first round to Carsten Ball. Raonic's first ATP main draw singles victory came in September 2010 at the Malaysian Open against No. 105 Igor Kunitsyn. He followed this with a second round victory over No. 31 Sergiy Stakhovsky. The following week, Raonic lost in the second round of the 2010 Japan Open to No. 1 Nadal. This marked his first singles match against a player ranked No. 1, and his first singles match against a member of the Big Four—a quartet of dominant tennis players including Nadal, Djokovic, Roger Federer, and Andy Murray.

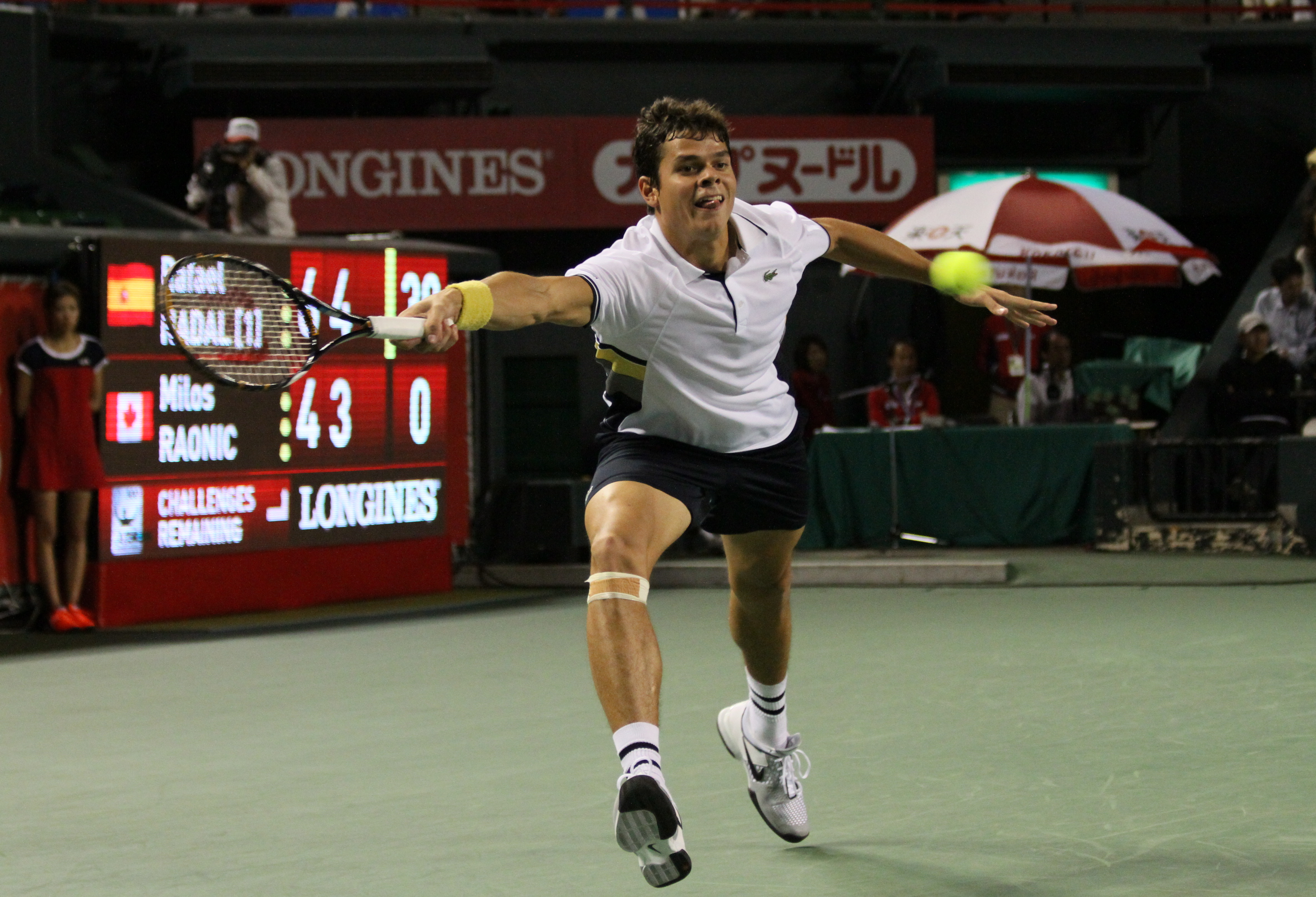
Raonic in the second set against Nadal at the 2010 Japan Open

Raonic's coaching relationship evolved during his early professional years. Since late 2007, Raonic had been working with Tennis Canada coaches—including Guillaume Marx, Head Boys National Coach—based out of the National Training Centre at Jarry Park in Montreal. In November 2009, with Raonic's world ranking at No. 377, Tennis Canada hired recently retired former player Frédéric Niemeyer to coach Raonic and travel with him for 18 weeks during the 2010 season. Toward the end of 2010, however, Niemeyer decided to travel less owing to "family considerations." As a result, Tennis Canada arranged for a two-week trial period with former No. 40 Galo Blanco in co-operation with Niemeyer, including tournaments in Malaysia and Japan in late September and early October. Over this period, Raonic climbed from No. 237 to No. 155. Tennis Canada hired Blanco, and Raonic moved to Barcelona to train with Blanco and trainer Tony Estalella. Commenting on the training regiment, Blanco said "the off-season Milos had this winter in Barcelona was amazing. We never saw anything like that before, working the way he worked for six weeks."

=== 2011: Top 25 and first ATP Tour title ===
The first two months of 2011 represented a significant breakthrough for Raonic, as he rose from No. 156 at the beginning of January to No. 37 by the end of February. In doing so, he became the highest-ranked Canadian male ever. He began this climb by qualifying for the Australian Open main draw. His first round victory over Björn Phau marked his first victory in a main draw Grand Slam match. In the second round, he defeated No. 22 seed Llodra, becoming the first Canadian man in 10 years to reach the third round of a Grand Slam singles tournament. With his career-first victory over a top 10 player (Mikhail Youzhny) in the third round, he became the first qualifier to make the fourth round of a major since Marcelo Filippini at the 1999 French Open.

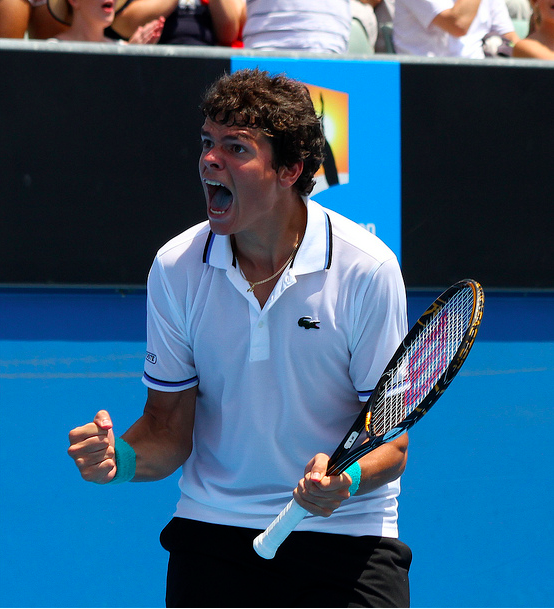
Raonic celebrates after beating Youzhny at the 2011 Australian Open

Despite losing in the fourth round to No. 7 David Ferrer, Raonic received rave reviews for his Australian Open performance. Patrick McEnroe said "Raonic [is] the real deal". BBC Sport referred to Raonic as part of "a new generation". Martina Navratilova referred to Raonic as "a new star" saying that "the sky is the limit". The Sydney Morning Herald referred to Raonic as a "future superstar".

Two weeks later, Raonic won his first ATP title at the Pacific Coast Championships, with victories over No. 45 Xavier Malisse, No. 170 James Blake, No. 74 Ričardas Berankis, and No. 9 Fernando Verdasco. With the victory, he became the first player born in the 1990s to win an ATP title, and the youngest winner since Marin Čilić won the 2008 Connecticut Open at age 19. Raonic's victory was the first ATP title by a Canadian since Greg Rusedski in 1995.

The following week, Raonic reached the final of an ATP 500 tournament for the first time at the U.S. National Indoor Tennis Championships. He defeated Verdasco for the second time in three days in the first round, and No. 17 Mardy Fish in the semifinal. In the final, he lost in three sets to No. 8 Roddick, with Roddick making a diving forehand to break serve for the match on his fifth championship point. Roddick stated: "That's the best shot I've ever hit in my life, considering the circumstance."

With his improved ranking (No. 37), Raonic earned direct entry to Grand Slam tournaments and other ATP World Tour events for the first time. He reached the third round at both the Indian Wells Masters and the Monte-Carlo Masters. In May, Raonic rose to a new career-high ranking of No. 25. He was seeded for the first time at a Grand Slam event at the French Open, but lost in the first round to Michael Berrer. At the Halle Open, Raonic reached his first ATP World Tour doubles final, partnered with Robin Haase. The pair lost to Rohan Bopanna and Aisam-ul-Haq Qureshi in the deciding super tiebreak. During his second round singles match at Wimbledon against Gilles Müller, Raonic retired with an early lead after injuring his right hip when he slipped and fell on the grass. He underwent hip surgery which prevented him from competing until September. His only significant result in the latter half of 2011 after returning from injury was a semifinal appearance at the Stockholm Open, where he lost to Gaël Monfils.

=== 2012: Continued rise and first title defence ===
Raonic began 2012 with titles in two of his first three tournaments, starting with his second ATP title at the Chennai Open in India. He had back-to-back wins over top 10 players at a tournament for the first time, beating Nicolás Almagro in the semifinals and Janko Tipsarević in the final. Raonic held serve during the entire tournament, becoming the first player to do so since Federer at the 2008 Halle Open. He lost in the third round of the Australian Open to Lleyton Hewitt. In February, Raonic defended his title at the Pacific Coast Championships, defeating Denis Istomin in the final for his third ATP title. The following week in Memphis, Raonic reached the final of the U.S. National Indoor Tennis Championships for the second straight year, but lost to Melzer.

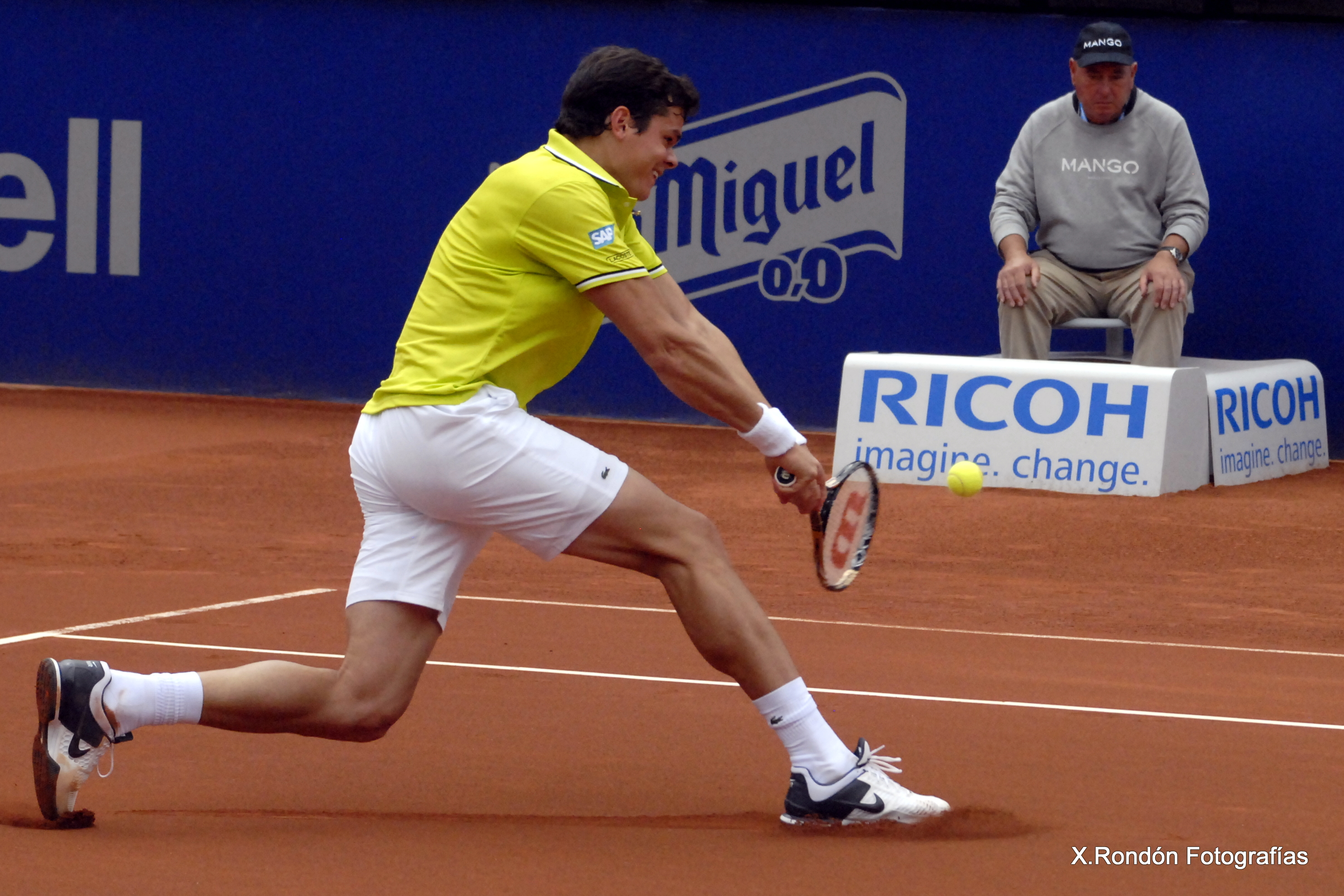
Raonic with a backhand return in the 2012 Barcelona Open

In the spring, Raonic played his first three matches against No. 3 Federer on three different surfaces: hard court in the third round of the Indian Wells Masters; clay in the second round at the Madrid Open; and grass in the quarterfinals at the Halle Open. On each occasion, Raonic won the first set before losing the next two. After the Halle Open match, Federer remarked: "I am happy to have beaten him now because by the end of my career, he'll be serving at 300 km/h." He defeated No. 4 Murray in straight sets in the quarterfinals at the Barcelona Open. This marked his first victory over a member of the Big Four. In the semifinal, he lost to No. 6 Ferrer. Raonic lost to Juan Mónaco in the third round of the French Open, and followed this with a second round loss to Querrey at Wimbledon.

Raonic reached his first ATP 1000 quarterfinals at back-to-back events in August, losing to John Isner at the Canadian Open and Stan Wawrinka at the Cincinnati Masters. His loss to Wawrinka followed his victory over No. 7 Tomáš Berdych, his fourth top 10 victory of the year. On August 13, his world ranking was No. 19, marking his first time in the top 20. At the US Open, Raonic lost in the fourth round to eventual champion Murray. Raonic was the first Canadian male to reach the fourth round of the US Open since Laurendeau in 1988. In October at the Japan Open, Raonic reached his third ATP 500 final, defeating Radek Štěpánek, Viktor Troicki, Tipsarević, and Murray, before dropping the final to Japan's Kei Nishikori in three sets. His victories over Tipsarević and Murray marked the third time he won back-to-back matches against top 10 players.

In 2012, Raonic led the ATP in points won on 1st serve (82%) and in service games won (93%). He finished the year at a career high singles ranking of No. 13. His six victories over top 10 players in 2012, including two over Murray, marks a career-high.

=== 2013: Top 10 ranking and first Masters 1000 final ===
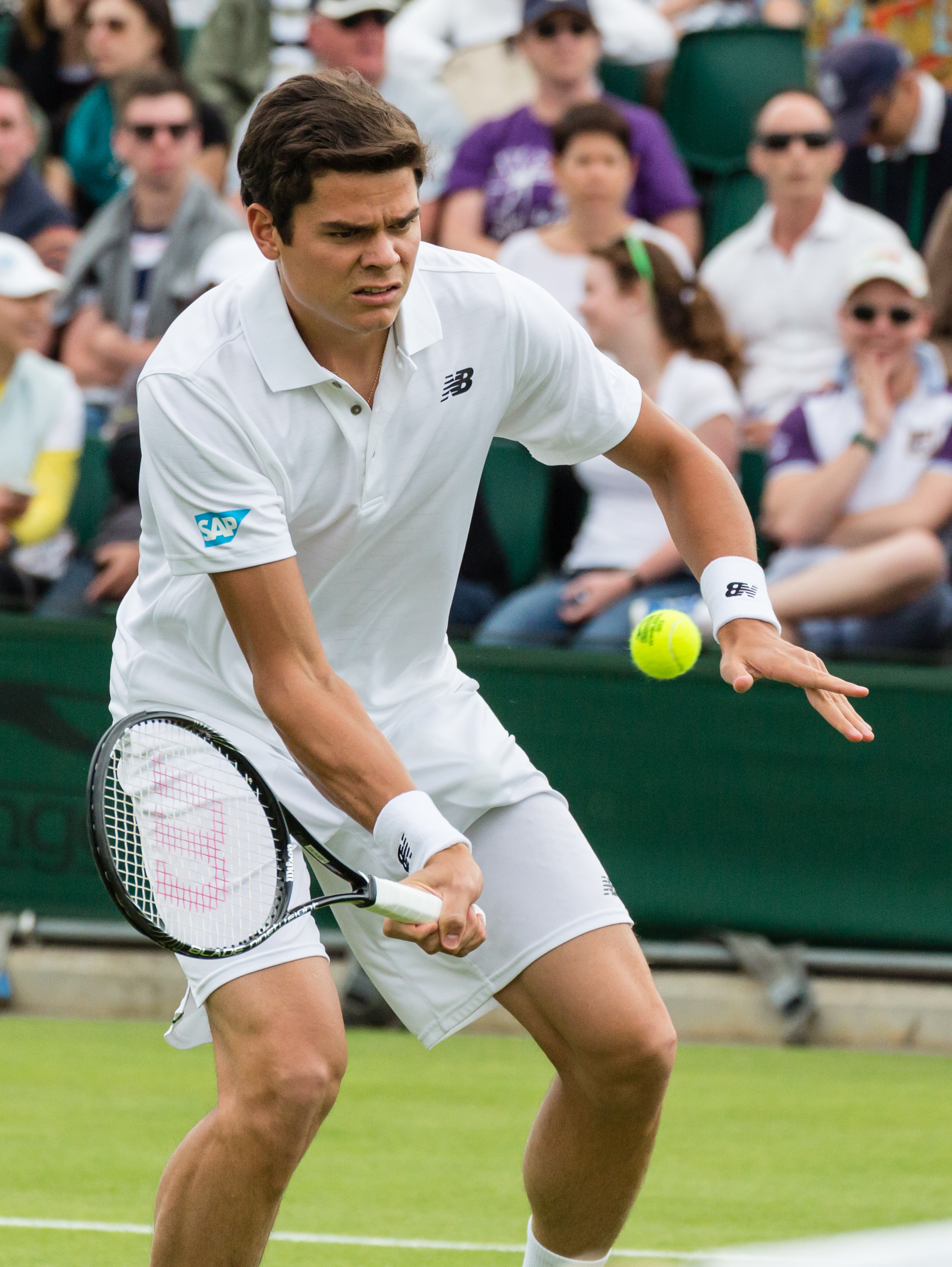
Raonic prepares to play a volley at Wimbledon in 2013

In all four 2013 Grand Slam tournaments, Raonic matched his previous best result. He reached the fourth round of the Australian Open, falling to No. 2 Federer. At the French Open, he lost in the third round to Kevin Anderson. At Wimbledon, he lost in the second round to Igor Sijsling. At the US Open, he fell to No. 9 Richard Gasquet in the fourth round in a five-set thriller, despite a career-high 39 aces.

Raonic again achieved success at ATP 250 and ATP 500 events. In February, Raonic earned his third consecutive title at the Pacific Coast Championships, defeating Tommy Haas in the final. Over three years, he achieved a perfect 12–0 match record, and did not drop a single set. He is the only man in the Open Era to win three consecutive singles titles at this event. In September, he won the Thailand Open tournament, defeating No. 9 Gasquet in the semifinals and No. 6 Berdych in the final. The titles were Raonic's fourth and fifth, both coming in ATP 250 events like previous titles. In October, Raonic reached the Japan Open final for the second consecutive year, but lost a close match to No. 7 Juan Martín del Potro. It marked his fourth consecutive loss in the final of an ATP 500 event.

In eight of the nine ATP 1000 events, Raonic matched or improved on his career-best performance. This included his first ATP 1000 series final at the Canadian Open in August. During his third round victory over del Potro, Raonic was awarded a point even though his foot touched the net. He did not report his error to the umpire, and won the last nine points to close out the match. Raonic later admitted that he was wrong not to admit his error at the time: "I made a mistake in the spur of the moment ... I'm disappointed with myself, how I dealt with it." After beating Ernests Gulbis in the quarterfinals, Raonic defeated compatriot Pospisil in the semifinals. The match against Pospisil was the first all-Canadian semifinal in an ATP 1000 tournament. In the final, he lost to Nadal in just 68 minutes. Following the tournament, Raonic was ranked No. 10, becoming the first Canadian player and the first player born in the 1990s to break into the top 10.

In 2013, Raonic again led the ATP in points won on first serve (82%) and in service games won (91%). He had 45 match victories for the second consecutive year. His coaching team underwent significant changes in 2013. In May, Raonic split with his coach of two and half years, Blanco. Less than a month later, Raonic hired former No. 3 tennis player Ivan Ljubičić as his coach. In December, he hired Riccardo Piatti as a co-coach with Ljubičić.

=== 2014: First Grand Slam semifinal ===
Raonic opened 2014 by reaching the third round of the Australian Open, losing to Grigor Dimitrov. He sustained an ankle injury that kept him out of action for six weeks.

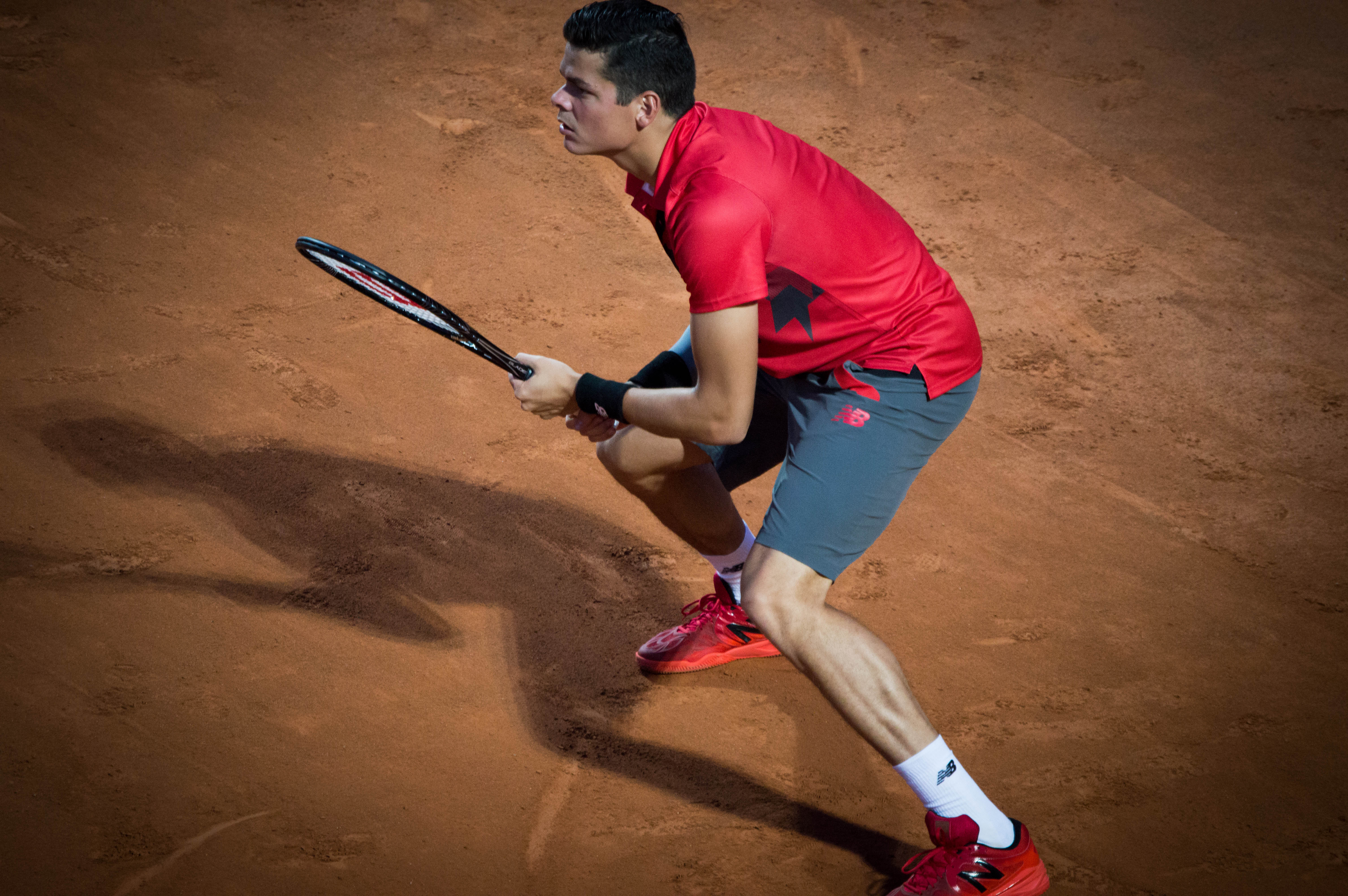
Raonic set to return serve at the 2014 Italian Open

From March through May, Raonic improved on his career-best performance at five consecutive ATP 1000 events. At the Indian Wells Masters, he beat No. 6 Murray to reach the quarterfinals, losing to Alexandr Dolgopolov. He lost in the quarterfinals of the Miami Masters to Nadal. He reached the quarterfinals for the third ATP 1000 tournament in a row at the Monte-Carlo Masters, before falling to Wawrinka. The result garnered Raonic a career-high ranking as world No. 9. Raonic lost in the third round of the Madrid Open to Nishikori. At the Italian Open, Raonic defeated Jérémy Chardy in the quarterfinals to reach his first Masters 1000 semifinal on clay. After winning the first set, he lost his semifinal match to eventual champion Djokovic. Although he had played Djokovic in the 2013 Davis Cup, this was their first ATP match against one another.

At the French Open, Raonic was seeded in the top eight for the first time at a Grand Slam tournament. He notched victories against Nick Kyrgios, Jiří Veselý, Gilles Simon, and Marcel Granollers to reach the quarterfinals of a major for the first time in his career, becoming the first Canadian man to do so in the Open Era. He lost in the quarterfinals to Djokovic in straight sets. After the match, Raonic commented: "I've gone farther in a Slam than I have before and I've learned things even from this loss."

At Wimbledon, Raonic was again seeded eighth. He defeated Matthew Ebden, Jack Sock, Łukasz Kubot, Nishikori, and Kyrgios to reach his first major semifinal. He became the first Canadian men's singles player to reach the semifinals at a major since Robert Powell in 1908. In the quarterfinal victory against Kyrgios, Raonic tied a career-high with 39 aces. In the semifinals, Raonic lost to Federer in straight sets. After the match, Raonic reflected: "There's a lot of good things to take from it. ... But when you get here to this point, I think it's just human nature, the greed of human nature, that you want so much more. You feel it in front of you and you want to grab it." Despite the loss, Raonic saw his world ranking improve to a career-high No. 6.

In his next tournament, Raonic reached his first final of the year at the Washington Open, facing Pospisil in the first all-Canadian final in ATP history. Raonic won the title in straight sets. It was his first ATP 500 title, after finishing as runner-up in four previous ATP 500 tournaments. After reaching the quarterfinals at the Canadian Open and the semifinals at the Cincinnati Masters, he claimed the men's 2014 US Open Series.

At the US Open, Raonic was seeded fifth. He won his first three matches to face rival Nishikori in the fourth round. On the morning of September 2, Raonic and Nishikori tied the all-time latest finish for a match at the US Open, ending at 2:26 a.m. This tied previous matches between Mats Wilander and Mikael Pernfors in 1993, and between Isner and Philipp Kohlschreiber in 2012. The five set match lasted 4 hours and 19 minutes, with Raonic losing and Nishikori advancing to the quarterfinals. In October, Raonic reached the final of the Japan Open for the third consecutive year, but lost to Nishikori again.

Three years prior, in 2011, Raonic had set a personal goal of reaching the year-end ATP Finals, where only the top eight players earned a spot. Heading into the last ATP 1000 event of 2014, the Paris Masters, Raonic trailed Ferrer for the eighth spot, and needed a deep run to surpass him. He beat Sock and Roberto Bautista Agut to set up a quarterfinals match against No. 2 Federer, who had beaten him in all six previous meetings. Needing a win to avoid being eliminated from contention for the ATP Finals, Raonic won in straight sets. His victory was hailed as "a career-defining win." In the post-match interview, Raonic was asked to rank this victory in his career. He replied: "Considering all the circumstances around it, I think this was the biggest win for me." He went on to beat No. 5 Berdych in the semifinals to earn a spot in the second ATP 1000 final of his career. He lost to Djokovic in the final, but secured his place in the 2014 ATP Finals. He is the first Canadian to reach the ATP Finals, and the first player born in the 1990s to do so. Anticlimactically, Raonic withdrew from the tournament due to a leg-muscle tear prior to his match against Nishikori, after losses to Federer and Murray.

Raonic ended the year at a career-high season-ending ranking of No. 8. He was one of just three players to reach the quarterfinals or better at seven of the nine ATP 1000 tournaments. Raonic finished with a career-high total of 1107 aces in 2014. At the time, this was the fifth highest single-year ace total in history. (It was surpassed by both Ivo Karlović and Isner in 2015.)

=== 2015: Top 4 ranking and injury woes ===
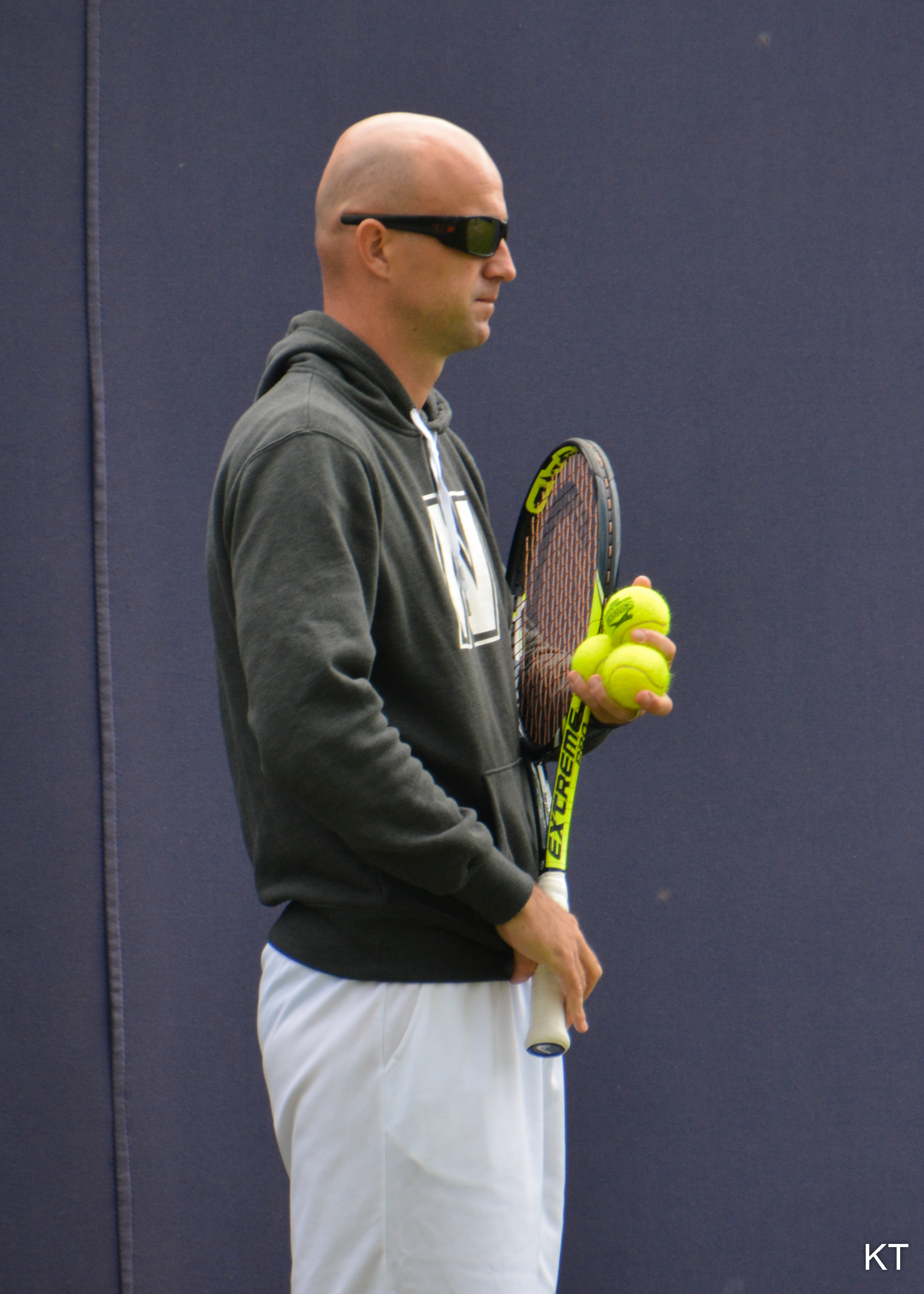
Raonic's former coach Ivan Ljubičić

Raonic began 2015 by reaching the final at the Brisbane International after defeating No. 5 Nishikori in three sets, all decided in tiebreaks. He lost to No. 2 Federer in three sets, with Federer recording his 1,000th match win on the professional tour. Later in the month, he reached the quarterfinals of the Australian Open after beating No. 12 Feliciano López. He lost to Djokovic in straight sets.

At the Indian Wells Masters, Raonic won his quarterfinal match against No. 3 Nadal, after saving three match points from Nadal in the second set tiebreak. It was Raonic's first career victory over Nadal after five defeats. He lost to Federer in the semifinals.

In April, Raonic opened the Monte-Carlo Masters with a victory over João Sousa. Just one game into his second-round match against Tommy Robredo, Raonic called for a medical timeout due to a right foot injury. Although he went on to win the match, Raonic's manager indicated that Raonic had made a pre-existing injury worse by playing. In his quarterfinal match against Berdych, he complained of numbness in his right foot during a medical timeout, and retired while trailing 2–5 in the opening set. It was diagnosed as a pinched nerve, and Raonic was expected to be healthy for the Madrid Open.

In Madrid, Raonic advanced to the quarterfinals with straight sets victories over Mónaco and Leonardo Mayer. After Raonic lost in the quarterfinals against Murray, Murray observed that Raonic was "struggling [with injury]." Following the match, Raonic announced that he would undergo surgery to repair a nerve in his foot, targeting a return in time for the French Open. Ironically, Raonic's world ranking reached a new career-high of No. 4 the following week, the highest by a Canadian man or woman.

Following surgery, Raonic withdrew from the Italian Open and the French Open. He returned in time for the grass court season. Having played in Halle in previous years, Raonic elected to play at the Queen's Club Championships for the first time. Raonic lost in the quarterfinals in his Queen's debut, and lost in the third round at Wimbledon. After his Wimbledon loss to Kyrgios, Raonic commented that his foot injury had led to problems throughout his body: "There wasn't a place it wasn't [bothering me]... First ankle, then the hip, and then the back. Then when those things aren't working, you just put too much pressure on your shoulder, and then your shoulder hurts." The cascading injuries led to a withdrawal from Canada's Davis Cup tie against Belgium; a withdrawal from the Washington Open, where Raonic was the defending champion; first round losses at the Canadian Open and Cincinnati Masters; and a third round loss at the US Open to López.

In September, at the St. Petersburg Open, Raonic won his seventh singles title—and first in Europe—with a three-set victory over Sousa. His serve was broken just once in the entire tournament. After early losses at the China Open and Shanghai Masters, Raonic ended his ATP season by withdrawing from three consecutive tournaments, citing injury. On November 2, he fell outside the top 10, dropping to No. 14. After six weeks off, Raonic joined the Philippine Mavericks of the exhibition International Premier Tennis League (IPTL) in December. After four matches, he withdrew due to back spasms.

In late November, Raonic parted ways with both Ljubičić, who had been his coach since June 2013, and Austin Nunn, who had been his media manager for nearly four years. Ljubičić was added to Federer's coaching team two weeks later. Raonic contacted former No. 1 tennis player Carlos Moyá about a coaching relationship, and they trained together and had discussions during the IPTL events. The relationship was subsequently formalized and on January 1, 2016, Raonic announced that Moyá would join his coaching team alongside Piatti. Raonic said that he chose Moyá for three reasons: "Carlos is very laid back and positive [... and] he communicates well."

=== 2016: First Grand Slam final and top 3 ranking ===
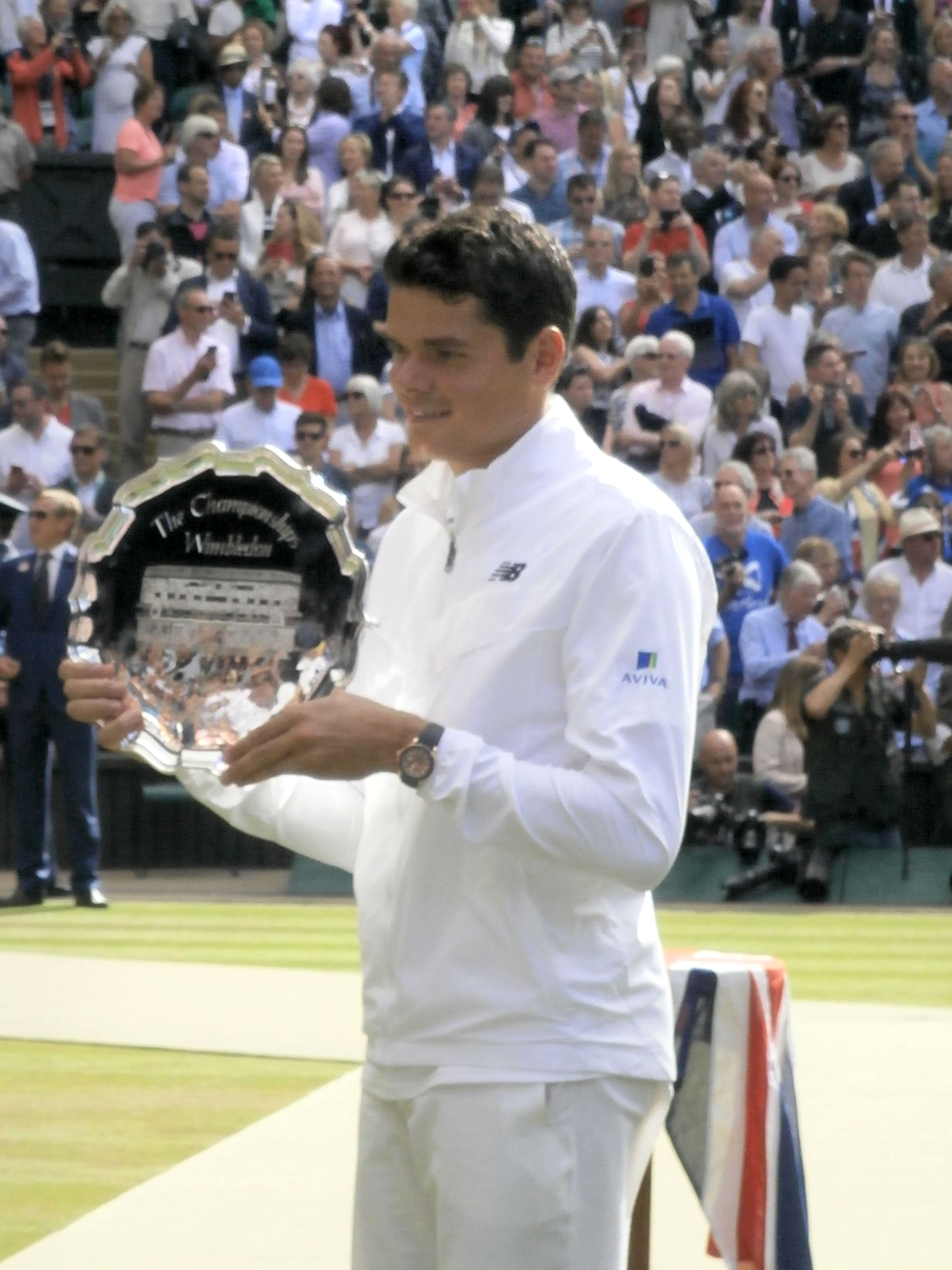
Milos Raonic was a finalist at Wimbledon in 2016. This was his first appearance in a Grand Slam final.

Raonic reached the final of the Brisbane International against No. 3 Federer in a rematch of their 2015 final. This time, Raonic upset Federer in straight sets, winning his eighth career title. Asked to talk about Raonic after the match, Federer observed: "[F]or a big guy he moves well ... He's improved his fitness the last few years. Also, tactically, I think he's better now than he's ever been. He's made a conscious effort of playing close to the baseline, which before when he was working with the Spanish coaches he was way back."

In the fourth round of the Australian Open, he upset No. 4 Wawrinka in five sets, beating the 2014 champion for the first time in five meetings. He then beat Monfils in the quarterfinals to advance to the semifinals of the Australian Open for the first time in his career. He became the first Canadian man to reach the Australian Open semifinals. In the semifinals, he lost to No. 2 Murray in five sets, sustaining an adductor injury while leading two sets to one. After the match, he reflected that the loss was "probably the most heartbroken [he has] felt on court."

The adductor injury kept Raonic out of competition for six weeks, during which he withdrew from the Delray Beach Open and the Mexican Open, and Canada's Davis Cup clash with France. He returned to action at the Indian Wells Masters, reaching the final against No. 1 Djokovic with a string of four victories over top 20 opponents: Bernard Tomic, Berdych, Monfils, and David Goffin. In the semifinal victory over Goffin, Raonic's average second serve (112 mph) was faster than Goffin's average first serve (110 mph). Before the final, Djokovic said: "Milos is probably playing the best tennis that he has ever played. His serve was phenomenal before the start of this season, but it seems like he has improved even more, especially the second serve. He's going for it more. He's not giving you the same look." Raonic lost a lopsided straight sets match to Djokovic in the final, his third consecutive loss in an ATP 1000 final.

Raonic followed Indian Wells by reaching the quarterfinals at the next three ATP 1000 events in Miami, Monte Carlo, and Madrid, eventually losing to Kyrgios, Murray, and Djokovic, respectively. On May 2, he re-entered the top 10 at No. 10. Raonic continued the clay court season with a second-round loss at the Italian Open to Kyrgios. At the French Open, he was the eighth seed, but fell in the fourth round in straight sets to No. 55 Albert Ramos Viñolas. During the French Open, former No. 1 and three-time Wimbledon champion John McEnroe announced that he would join Raonic's team as a consultant for the grass court season. Commenting on McEnroe joining Moyá and Piatti on his coaching team, Raonic said: "I was sort of just looking for another set of eyes to be a bit more efficient on grass" and he said it was about "generally improving." McEnroe left Raonic's team in August.

Raonic began the grass court season by advancing to his first grass court final at the Queen's Club Championships without dropping serve in victories over Kyrgios, Veselý, Bautista Agut, and Tomic, but lost the final in three sets to Murray. At Wimbledon, Raonic won his first three matches in straight sets against Pablo Carreño Busta, Andreas Seppi, and Sock. In the fourth round against Goffin, Raonic came back from a two set deficit to win in five sets for the first time in his career. In ten previous best-of-five matches where he lost the first two sets, he also lost the third set. Raonic then beat Querrey in the quarterfinals and Federer in the semifinals, marking Federer's first defeat in 11 Wimbledon semifinals. With the victory, Raonic reached his first Grand Slam final, matching Greg Rusedski. In the final, he lost to Murray in straight sets, though he made the fastest serve of the tournament at 147 miles per hour (237 km/h).

With the transition to hard courts after Wimbledon, Raonic made the quarterfinals of the Canadian Open, losing to Monfils, before falling to Murray for the fifth time in 2016 in the Cincinnati Masters semifinal. Raonic was the fifth seed at the US Open, but lost in the second round to Ryan Harrison, partly due to debilitating cramps. In September, cramps were cited as the reason for Raonic to miss Canada's Davis Cup tie against Chile. Later that month, Raonic failed to defend his title at the St. Petersburg Open, falling in his opening match to Youzhny. Raonic withdrew from the China Open prior to his semifinal match due to an ankle injury sustained in the quarterfinal. With the result, Raonic qualified for the ATP World Tour Finals for the second time. Raonic suffered another injury, a quadriceps tear, during his quarterfinal match against Jo-Wilfried Tsonga at the Paris Masters and withdrew before his scheduled semifinal against Murray.

At the ATP World Tour Finals, Raonic lost to Djokovic, but beat Monfils and Thiem in round robin play to qualify for his first Tour Finals semifinal. He lost the semifinal match to Murray in 3 hours and 38 minutes, the longest match on the ATP Tour in 2016 and the longest match in World Tour Finals history. Raonic rose to a career-high No. 3, finishing the year behind only Murray and Djokovic. In December, he ended his coaching relationship with Moya, and added former Wimbledon champion Richard Krajicek to his coaching staff alongside Piatti for the 2017 season.

=== 2017: More injuries and out of top 20 ===
At his first tournament of the season, the Brisbane International, Raonic reached the semifinals with wins over Diego Schwartzman and Rafael Nadal in the first two rounds. He lost to Grigor Dimitrov in straight sets. At the Australian Open, he won his first two matches in straight sets respectively over Dustin Brown and Gilles Müller. In the third and fourth rounds, he defeated Gilles Simon and then Roberto Bautista Agut both in four sets. Though Raonic failed to get past eventual finalist Rafael Nadal in the quarterfinals, this result marked the third year in a row that Milos made at least the quarterfinals at this tournament. At his next tournament in February, he reached the final in Delray Beach, giving Jack Sock a walkover in the final due to a hamstring tear in his right leg.

Returning from injury at the Miami Open in March, Raonic defeated Viktor Troicki in his opening round but had to withdraw from his next match against qualifier Jared Donaldson, again with the hamstring injury. In May, Raonic advanced to his second final of the season, losing to Marin Čilić in Istanbul. He lost in the fourth round of the French Open to Pablo Carreño Busta in a five-set marathon. At Wimbledon, he made it to the quarterfinals but was defeated by Roger Federer in straight sets. After his run at Wimbledon, he only played two more tournaments, losing in the quarterfinals in Washington, D.C. to Jack Sock and in the second round in Montreal to Adrian Mannarino. He then had to withdraw from various tournaments, including the US Open, due to injury. Raonic returned in October at the Japan Open but had to retire in his second round match against Yūichi Sugita again with an injury. Although he reached two finals in 2017, it was the first time since 2011 that he failed to win at least one title.

=== 2018: Return to top 20 ===
After ending his 2017 season early, Raonic dropped to No. 24. He began his season at the Brisbane International as the fourth seed. He lost in the second round to Alex de Minaur in straight sets. Raonic then went on to compete at the 2018 Australian Open, where he lost in the opening round to Lukáš Lacko in four sets. This was Raonic's second time overall that he lost in the first round of a Grand Slam and the first time since the 2011 French Open. This also meant that he would fall out of the top 30 for the first time since February 2011.

Raonic's next tournament was the Delray Beach Open. He easily beat Taro Daniel in the first round but went on to lose to Steve Johnson in straight sets in the next round. At Indian Wells, Raonic reached his first Masters 1000 semifinal since November 2016 in Paris with wins over compatriot Félix Auger-Aliassime, João Sousa, Marcos Baghdatis by walkover and Sam Querrey, respectively in the first rounds. He was defeated by Juan Martín del Potro in straight sets. The next week at the Miami Open, Raonic advanced to the quarterfinals but lost for the second week in a row to del Potro, this time in three close sets. He did not compete at the French Open because of a knee injury. In June at the Stuttgart Open, he advanced to his first final in over a year, but was defeated by world No. 2 Roger Federer.

At Wimbledon, he advanced to the quarterfinals, but lost to John Isner.

=== 2019: Fourth Australian Open quarterfinal ===
Raonic was seeded 16th at the 2019 Australian Open. He defeated Nick Kyrgios in the first round in straight sets and narrowly defeated 2014 champion Stan Wawrinka in four close tiebreak sets in the second round. In the third, he defeated Pierre-Hugues Herbert. In the fourth round, he faced fourth seed Alexander Zverev. He started the match dominantly, winning 12 of the first 14 games to take a two-set lead. Zverev played a competitive third set, but Raonic ultimately won in a tiebreak. In the quarterfinals, he lost to 28th seed Lucas Pouille in four sets.

He announced his split with coach Goran Ivanišević, and will now be coached by French former ATP player Fabrice Santoro.

=== 2020: Fifth Australian Open quarterfinal, Fourth Masters 1000 final ===
Raonic started his 2020 at the Qatar Open in Doha where he was seeded 4th. However, in his first match he lost to Corentin Moutet in straight sets. Raonic then participated in 2020 Australian Open, where he defeated Lorenzo Giustino, Cristian Garín, Stefanos Tsitsipas and Marin Čilić before losing to Novak Djokovic at the quarter-final stage in straight sets. In February 2020, Raonic participated in New York Open where he was seeded second, but he lost to Soonwoo Kwon in his first match at the tournament. Days later, he took part in Delray Beach Open and defeated Denis Istomin, Cedrik-Marcel Stebe, Steve Johnson before losing his semi-final match to Reilly Opelka.

Raonic found form at the 2020 Cincinnati Masters, where he defeated Sam Querrey, Daniel Evans, and a resurgent Andy Murray, all in straight sets. In the quarterfinal stage, he recovered from a set and a break down, and saved a match point to defeat Filip Krajinović in their quarterfinal encounter. He defeated 4th seed Stefanos Tsitsipas in straight sets to reach his fourth Masters 1000 final. He lost to Novak Djokovic in 3 sets in the final. At the US Open, he lost in the second round to countryman, Vasek Pospisil.

After a semifinal appearance at the St. Petersburg Open, Raonic would end his year with another semifinal appearance at the Paris Masters where he lost to 3rd seed and eventual champion Daniil Medvedev in straight sets.

=== 2021: ATP Cup debut, injuries and hiatus ===
Raonic opened his 2021 campaign at the 2021 ATP Cup representing team Canada alongside countrymen Denis Shapovalov, Steven Diez and Peter Polansky. Canada was drawn into a round robin group with teams Serbia and Germany, and Raonic was penciled in as the number 2 player. In the first tie against team Serbia, Raonic won his singles match in straight sets over Dušan Lajović. Partnering with Shapovalov in the deciding doubles match, they were unable to get the win and thus lost the tie 2–1. In the second tie, versus team Germany, Raonic lost his singles match against Jan-Lennard Struff in two tiebreaker sets, and after Shapovalov lost his match against Zverev, Canada was officially eliminated from the tournament. At the 2021 Australian Open, he lost in the fourth round to eventual champion Novak Djokovic.

Raonic struggled with calf and right leg injuries for most of the year. After losing in the fourth round at the 2021 Miami Masters to eventual champion Hubert Hurkacz in three sets, he took a hiatus that lasted for three months and returned at the 2021 Atlanta Open in July. As the top seed, he lost in his opening match against eventual finalist Brandon Nakashima in three sets. After the loss, he took another hiatus due to his injuries.

=== 2023: Comeback for grass season after two years ===
According to his coach Mario Tudor, Raonic planned on returning to the tour in 2023. In May, news came that he would participate in the grass court season. In June, he entered the 2023 Libéma Open using his protected ranking and won his first match back, defeating fifth seed Miomir Kecmanović in straight sets. He won his first Major match since 2021 at the 2023 Wimbledon Championships defeating Dennis Novak. He lost to Tommy Paul in the second round. As a result, he moved more than 300 positions up, close to the top 500 in the rankings. He stated that this might be his last Wimbledon. He further added he expected to play the Canadian Open in Toronto and then the US Open before retiring. In Canada, he reached the third round, losing to Mackenzie McDonald. In November 2023, Raonic competed for Canada at the Davis Cup for the first time since 2018. He beat Patrick Kaukovalta in straight sets, but Canada ultimately lost to Finland who progressed to the semifinals of the tournament.

=== 2024: Return to Australian Open, Olympics, early end of season ===
In January 2024, Raonic returned to the Australian Open using protected ranking, where his first round match was against home favourite Alex de Minaur. Raonic took the first set and de Minaur took the second. In the third set de Minaur had secured a break when Raonic retired from the game with a leg injury.

In February 2024, Raonic was scheduled to play for Canada again at the Davis Cup qualifiers versus South Korea but did not participate. He returned to the top 200 at world No. 197 on 18 March 2024.

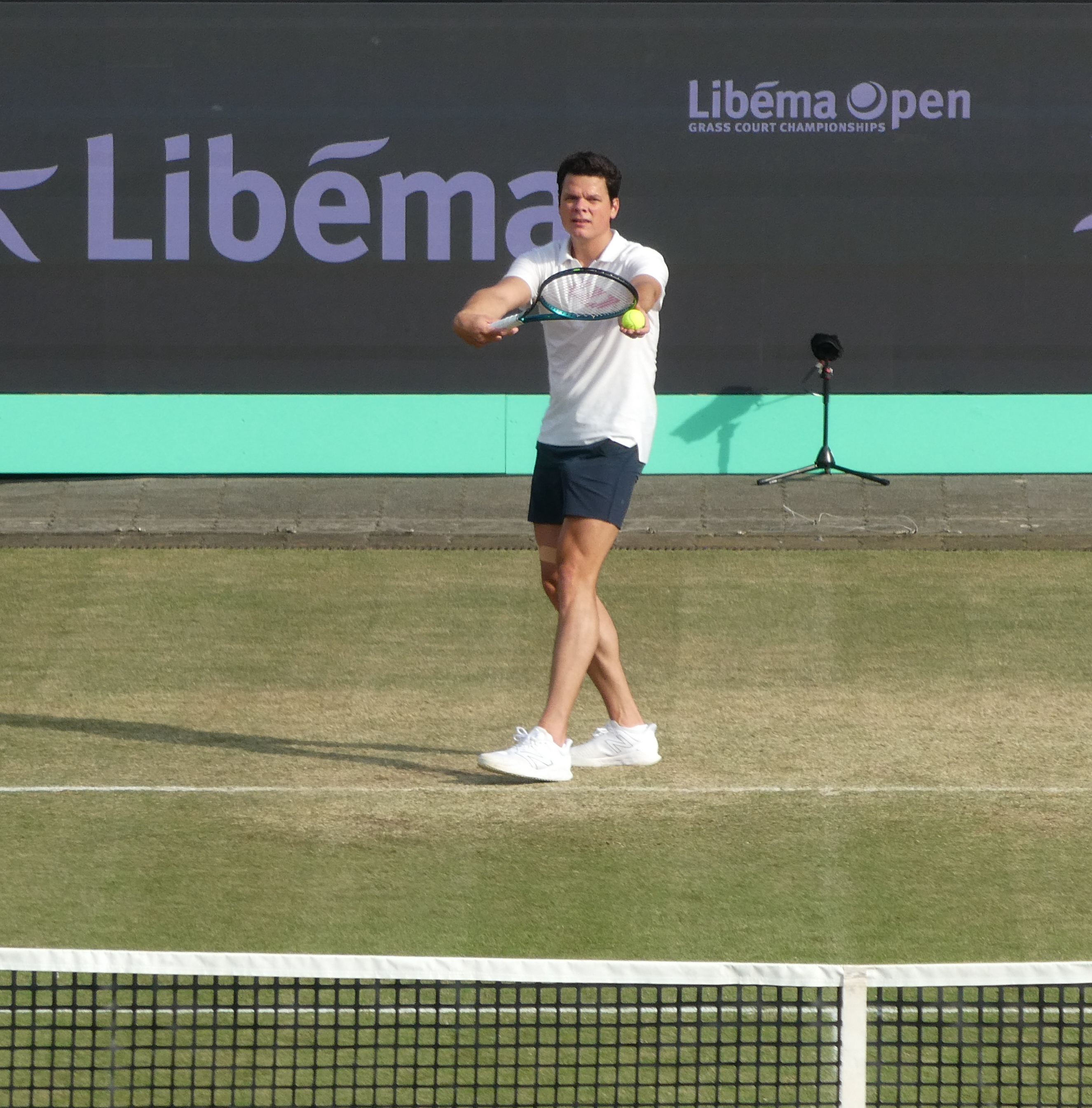
Raonic at the 2024 Libéma Open

In the beginning of the grass court season, again using protected ranking, he reached his second quarterfinal of the season at the 2024 Libéma Open in 's-Hertogenbosch (after Rotterdam) defeating eight seed Jordan Thompson and Roberto Bautista Agut. Next he entered the 2024 Queen's Club Championships and defeated local favorite Cameron Norrie in three tight sets, hitting 47 aces, a new record for a best-of-three match (surpassing Karlovic in 2015 with 45). As a result he moved into the top 155 in the ATP singles rankings on 1 July 2024.

Raonic represented Canada at the 2024 Paris Olympics where he was defeated by Dominik Koepfer of Germany in the first round. Raonic was then scheduled to play in Montreal at the Canadian Open but withdrew due to a shoulder injury which ended his season.

=== 2026: Retirement ===
Raonic announced his retirement on Instagram on 12 January 2026, ending an 18-year long career. He had not played a match since July 2024.

== National representation ==
Early in his career, Raonic was questioned about whether he would follow the example of Rusedski, the last prominent Canadian tennis player, who decided to represent Great Britain instead. Raonic declared that he would play for Canada.

Raonic embraced his role as Canada's top singles player, intent on growing the game in Canada. He stated in 2010: "I want to make a difference in Canada with [my career]. I feel if I were to achieve my goals it could make a great difference to the growth of tennis in Canada and help to produce more top players in the future." Before a Davis Cup tie with Japan in 2015, he said: "I'm here because I want to be here. I don't have anybody telling me I need to be here. I want to succeed at this event, and I want to succeed representing Canada."

=== Davis Cup ===
From 2010 to 2016, Canada competed in 16 Davis Cup ties. Raonic represented Canada in 11 of those ties, missing five due to injury: Ecuador in 2011, Japan in 2014, Belgium in 2015, and France and Chile in 2016. Overall, Raonic has 16 match wins in 22 Davis Cup matches (14–5 in singles; 2–1 in doubles). He is one of the most successful players in Canadian Davis Cup history, tied for sixth in match wins overall and for third in singles match wins.

Raonic made his Davis Cup debut in Bogotá against Colombia in 2010 at the age of 19. Raonic lost both of his singles matches (against Santiago Giraldo and Juan Sebastián Cabal), but won his doubles match partnered with Nestor, who was then the top ranked doubles player in the world. His first singles match victory came in Canada's next tie against the Dominican Republic, when he beat Víctor Estrella Burgos in five sets. This marked the first five set match of Raonic's career. Competing against Mexico in 2011, Raonic won three rubbers in a tie for the first time, beating both Manuel Sánchez and Daniel Garza in singles and partnering with Pospisil to win in doubles as well.

In the 2013 Davis Cup World Group first round, Raonic won singles rubbers over Ramos Viñolas and Guillermo García López to lead Canada over top-seeded Spain. He repeated this feat with victories over Fabio Fognini and Seppi to help Canada defeat Italy in the quarterfinals, sending Canada into the Davis Cup semifinals for the first time since 1913. (Note: Canada reached the Davis Cup semifinals in 1913, but the 16-team World Group format was adopted in 1981, and 2013 marked Canada's first appearance in the World Group semifinals.) In the semifinal against Serbia, Raonic won his singles match over Tipsarević, but lost to No. 1 Djokovic as Canada was eliminated. The defeat marked Raonic's first singles match against Djokovic.

=== Olympics ===
Raonic represented Canada at the London 2012 Olympics and competed in the singles competition as an unseeded player. He won his first-round match over Japan's Tatsuma Ito in straight sets. In the second round, Raonic lost to French player Tsonga 3–6, 6–3, 23–25, breaking three Olympic tennis records. The match holds the records for the most games played in a best-of-three sets match (66 games) and the most games played in a single set (48 games) in Olympic history. At the time, it was the longest Olympic match by time played (3 hours 57 minutes), but this record was broken three days later in the semifinal match between Federer and del Potro (4 hours 26 minutes).

Raonic decided not to play in the 2016 Summer Olympics, citing health concerns and the Zika virus.

=== Hopman Cup ===
In 2014, Raonic partnered with Bouchard to represent Canada in the Hopman Cup. Raonic won two of three singles matches, and paired with Bouchard to win two of three doubles matches. Canada finished in second place in their pool—behind top-seeded Poland—and were eliminated.

== Playing style ==
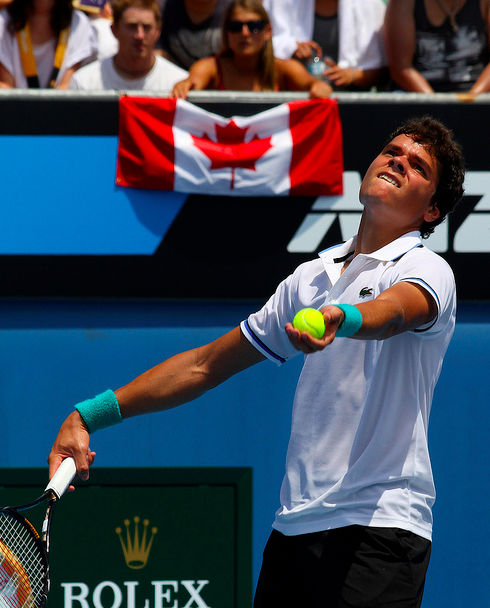
Raonic serving at the 2011 Australian Open

The most distinctive part of Raonic's game was his powerful and accurate serve, from which his "Missile" nickname was derived. He was frequently cited as having one of the best serves among his contemporaries, along with Karlović and Isner. Some consider Raonic's serve to be among the best of all time. Sampras, Raonic's childhood idol, describes the Canadian's serve as "bigger than big." After a match against Raonic, Djokovic commented "I can't recall the last time I was feeling so helpless returning. Even his second serve." Women's tennis player Serena Williams has said that "If she could take one thing from another player, it would be Milos Raonic's serve." Statistically, Raonic is among the strongest servers in the Open Era, winning 91% of service games to rank third all-time. Raonic had one of the fastest recorded serves of all time.

Aided by his serve, Raonic employed an all-court style with an emphasis on short points. His groundstrokes were both good, but his forehand was stronger than his backhand. Because of this, he was known to run around his backhand and hit inside-out forehands instead. He attempted to dictate play and is generally more aggressive than his opponent, as evidenced by usually having more winners and more unforced errors. To finish points quickly, Raonic occasionally approached the net, with either a serve and volley or chip and charge strategy.

Raonic preferred playing on hard courts, where he was more successful than on clay or grass courts. All but two of the tournaments where Raonic reached the final were played on hard courts, and all but three of his victories over top 10 players were on hard courts as well.

When he was twenty, the National Post described Raonic as a "hothead whose on-court demeanour was holding him back." As he grew older, commentators came to see him as "stoic", "robotic", and "emotionless", with The Daily Telegraph referring to him as "an analytical character who questions everything he does in practice". In 2014, Raonic explained: "I'm the son of two engineers, so everything is a numbers and calculation game." In 2016, he added: "I am very systematic in how [I] need to go about things to bring out the best tennis for myself, and maybe that comes off as mechanical and robotic and those kind of things, but I don't know if I'd ever change that because I feel that's the way I get the best out of myself when it comes to my tennis."

Aspects of Raonic's game which were criticized include his return of serve, quickness and mobility, backhand, short game, and the use of backspin or sidespin. His above-average height—196 cm (6 ft 5 in)—was linked to his strong serve, but was said to limit his movement around the court.

== Equipment and apparel ==
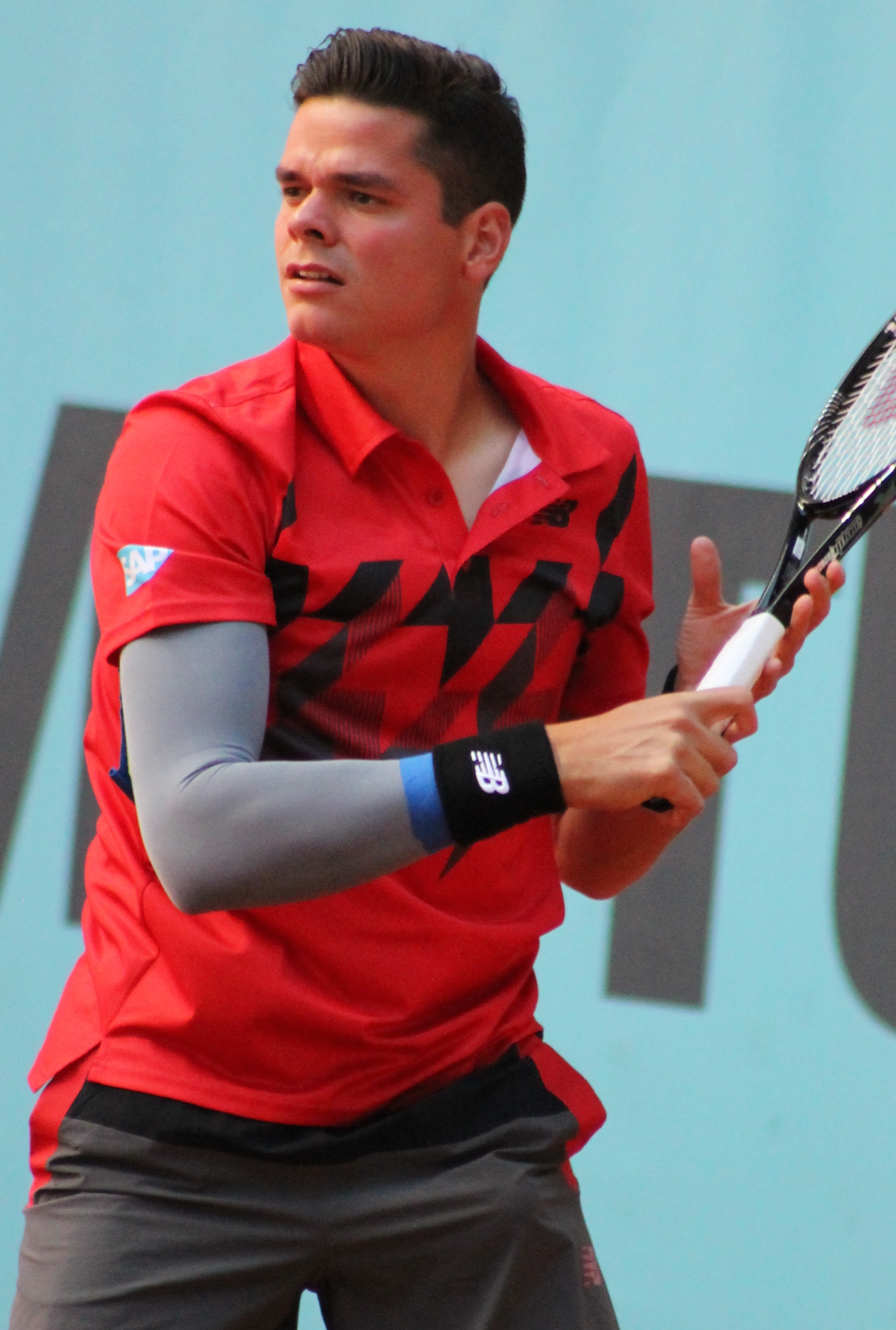
Raonic with his right arm sleeve at the 2014 Madrid Open

Raonic endorses the Wilson BLX Blade 98 18x20 tennis racket, and uses LUXILON M2 Pro 1.25 16L strings. In January 2013, Raonic became the first tennis player to endorse New Balance clothing and shoes, in a deal reported to be worth "US$1 million annually over a five-year term." Roughly two and a half years later, this deal was extended "for the length of [Raonic's] career and beyond," and stipulates that New Balance will increase its support of the Milos Raonic Foundation. The lifelong nature of this contract was described by Tennis Canada as "unique."

Since March 2014, Raonic has donned a sleeve on his right arm while playing. At first, he wore a fisherman's sleeve to cover a rash he had due to an allergic reaction to massage cream. This was replaced with an athletic compression sleeve, often colour-coordinated with his on-court apparel. The sleeve is worn for comfort, and wearing it became a habit for Raonic. The sleeve has become a distinctive part of Raonic's image, and has spawned a Twitter account. The motto "Believe in the Sleeve" has become synonymous with Raonic in the media and among Raonic's fans. Serena Williams described the sleeve as "super cool and different."

Raonic is represented by CAA Sports, a division of Creative Artists Agency. His other sponsorship deals include Aviva (insurance), Canada Goose (apparel), Commerce Court (real estate), Lacoste (apparel), Rolex (watches), SAP (software), and Zepp (sports metrics).

== Rivals and contemporaries ==
=== Raonic and the Big Four ===
Raonic held a combined 9–36 record against the Big Four, including 0–12 against Djokovic, 2–7 against Nadal, 3–11 against Federer, and 4–9 against Murray.

Each of Raonic's deepest runs in significant tournaments (i.e. majors and ATP 1000 tournaments) ended with a loss to a member of the Big Four: Nadal in the 2013 Canadian Open final, Federer in the 2014 Wimbledon semifinal, Djokovic in the 2014 Paris Masters final, Murray in the 2016 Australian Open semifinal, Djokovic in the 2016 Indian Wells Masters final, Murray in the 2016 Wimbledon final, and Murray in the semifinals of the 2016 ATP World Tour Finals. At majors, Raonic had a 1–8 record against the Big Four, losing the first five matches in straight sets. He met only one of the four in Davis Cup play: he lost to Djokovic in the 2013 semifinals.

Raonic's most frequent opponent, either inside or outside the Big Four, was Federer (14 matches). His first victory over Federer in the 2014 Paris Masters quarterfinal was hailed as "a career-defining win." His second victory over Federer—at the 2016 Brisbane International—was his first in a final against the Big Four. A third victory over Federer—in the 2016 Wimbledon semifinal—marked Raonic's first victory at a Grand Slam tournament against the Big Four. Raonic referred to his match against Murray at the 2016 ATP World Tour Finals as "the best match [he's] ever competed in."

=== Raonic and Nishikori ===
Kei Nishikori is often cited as Raonic's primary rival. The two have very different strengths; according to The Globe and Mail, Raonic uses his "size and his serve", while Nishikori uses his "savvy and speed." Both are the first from their respective countries to achieve a top 10 ranking, and both have a career-high ranking inside the top 4. In May 2015, they were the two youngest players in the top 10. Nishikori holds a 5–2 advantage in seven close matches, including two wins in the Japan Open final (2012, 2014). Of the twenty-five sets they have played, ten have required a tiebreak. Only one of their matches has been a straight sets victory. Five matches have required the maximum number of sets. One of these was a marathon US Open five-set match that equalled the record for latest finish ever at 2:26 a.m.

Nishikori and Raonic are among a group of players whom tennis pundits suggest could be the successors of the Big Four. The members of this group vary, but have included Grigor Dimitrov, Ernests Gulbis, Marin Čilić, and Dominic Thiem. Raonic holds a positive record against Gulbis and Thiem, having won on all six combined occasions, but has a negative record against Čilić and Dimitrov, having lost four matches to the latter in six meetings, including one walkover.

=== Raonic and Pospisil ===
Pospisil is more of a contemporary rather than a rival of Raonic. Owing to their similarity in age—Pospisil is six months older—and the fact that both are successful products of Tennis Canada's development programs, they have been linked as the leaders of a new generation of Canadian tennis players. They partnered in doubles frequently early in their careers, winning doubles titles together in junior and ATP Challenger events. Between 2011 and 2015, Raonic and Pospisil have been the two top-ranked Canadian men in year-end rankings. (Note: Raonic finished each year as the top-ranked Canadian player, with Pospisil ranked No. 2.) As well as four ATP Challenger and Futures matches, they have played each other in two ATP World Tour matches: Raonic beat Pospisil in the first all-Canadian semifinal at an ATP 1000 tournament, and in the first all-Canadian final in ATP history. They are frequent Davis Cup teammates, and they planned to play doubles together at the 2016 Rio Olympics until Raonic withdrew.

=== Raonic, Isner, and Karlović ===
Raonic is often compared to Isner and Karlović. The trio possess statistically dominant serves, leading the ATP in service games won and in aces per match in the period between 2012 and 2018. They have played each other infrequently, however. Raonic is 1–1 against Karlović and 1–5 against Isner. Karlović holds a 3–2 head-to-head advantage over Isner.

		Ivo Karlović		John Isner		Milos Raonic	
		% or #	ATP Rank	% or #	ATP Rank	% or #	ATP Rank
Service games won	2012	87%	5th	92%	2nd	93%	1st
Service games won	2013	91%	2nd	90%	3rd	91%	1st
Service games won	2014	93%	2nd	93%	1st	90%	4th
Service games won	2015	96%	1st	93%	3rd	94%	2nd
Service games won	2016	93%	2nd	93%	1st	91%	3rd
Service games won	2017	93%	n/a	93%	1st	90%	n/a
Service games won	2018	93%	n/a	94%	1st	91%	3rd
Service games won	2019	83%	n/a	94%	1st	81%	n/a
Service games won	Career	92.00%	1st	91.81%	2nd	91.09%	3rd
Aces per match	2012	15.3	3rd	16.8	1st	16.2	2nd
Aces per match	2013	17.3	1st	16.3	2nd	14.7	3rd
Aces per match	2014	18.5	1st	17.4	2nd	16.5	3rd
Aces per match	2015	23.0	1st	18.5	2nd	15.8	3rd
Aces per match	2016	20.9	2nd	23.2	1st	12.7	6th
Aces per match	2017	20.9	5th	19.7	1st	13.8	8th
Aces per match	2018	23.5	6th	22.4	1st	17.5	3rd
Aces per match	2019	23.7	8th	21.5	1st	19.4	4th
Aces per match	2020	13.4	79th	21.3	2nd	16.5	1st
Aces per match	Career	19.78	2nd	18.74	1st	15.58	9th

== Philanthropy ==
In 2011, while recovering from a hip injury sustained at Wimbledon, Raonic decided to become involved with philanthropic work, focusing on helping disadvantaged children. The following year, in 2012, he launched the Milos Raonic Foundation, which aims to "support children from disadvantaged backgrounds in order to remove economic, physical and other barriers that might prevent them from becoming healthy, productive members of society. ... In the initial stages of its work, the foundation will focus, in particular, on children with physical disabilities." As of 2016, the foundation had awarded $120,000 in grants to the Holland Bloorview Kids Rehabilitation Hospital, and $30,000 to the Canadian Paralympic Committee. Raonic and his parents are the three directors of the foundation, which has partnered with ATP Aces for Charity.

Several celebrity fundraising events have been held in conjunction with the foundation. On November 15, 2012, the inaugural "Raonic Race for Kids" was held, with multiple teams competing in quick physical and intellectual challenges. Teams were led by celebrities, including Canadian Football Hall of Fame quarterback Damon Allen and tennis players Eugenie Bouchard and Daniel Nestor. The next night, a second "Face Off" event featured exhibition matches between Raonic and Andy Roddick, and between Serena Williams and Agnieszka Radwańska. In November 2013, the second "Raonic Race for Kids" featured Davis Cup captain Martin Laurendeau, musician Jim Cuddy, and broadcaster George Stroumboulopoulos. The third "Raonic Race for Kids" in November 2014 featured Tennis Canada CEO Kelly Murumets, soccer player Dwayne De Rosario, and figure-skating champions Patrick Chan, Tessa Virtue, and Scott Moir.

In December 2020 it was announced that Raonic joined the High Impact Athletes, an organization based on the effective altruism movement where professional athletes pledge to donate at least 1% of its income to the most effective, evidence-based charities in the world.

== Career statistics ==
=== Grand Slam tournament performance timeline ===
Key
W	F	SF	QF	#R	RR	Q#	DNQ	A	NH

(W) winner; (F) finalist; (SF) semifinalist; (QF) quarterfinalist; (#R) rounds 4, 3, 2, 1; (RR) round-robin stage; (Q#) qualification round; (DNQ) did not qualify; (A) absent; (NH) not held; (SR) strike rate (events won / competed); (W–L) win–loss record.
To avoid confusion and double counting, these charts are updated at the conclusion of a tournament or when the player's participation has ended.

Tournament	2010	2011	2012	2013	2014	2015	2016	2017	2018	2019	2020	2021	2022	2023	2024	SR	W–L	Win%
Australian Open	A	4R	3R	4R	3R	QF	SF	QF	1R	QF	QF	4R	A	A	1R	0 / 12	34–12	74%
French Open	A	1R	3R	3R	QF	A	4R	4R	A	A	A	A	A	A	A	0 / 6	14–6	70%
Wimbledon	A	2R	2R	2R	SF	3R	F	QF	QF	4R	NH	A	A	2R	A	0 / 10	28–10	74%
US Open	1R	A	4R	4R	4R	3R	2R	A	4R	A	2R	A	A	1R	A	0 / 9	16–9	64%
Win–loss	0–1	4–3	8–4	9–4	14–4	8–3	15–4	11–3	7–3	7–2	5–2	3–1	0–0	1–2	0–1	0 / 37	92–37	71%

Note: Milos Raonic has not played doubles at any Grand Slam tournament.

=== Grand Slam tournament finals: 1 (1 runner-up) ===
Result	Year	Championship	Surface	Opponent	Score
Loss	2016	Wimbledon	Grass	(United Kingdom) Andy Murray	4–6, 6–7^{(3–7)}, 6–7^{(2–7)}

=== Records ===
- These records were attained in the Open Era of tennis (post-1968).

Tournament	Time span	Record accomplished	Players matched
Pacific Coast; Championships	2011–2013	3 consecutive titles	Shared with Kei Nishikori
Pacific Coast; Championships	2011–2013	3 consecutive finals	John McEnroe; Pete Sampras; Andre Agassi
Summer Olympics	2012	Most games played in a best-of-three sets match (66 games; Tsonga won 6–3, 3–6, 25–23)	Jo-Wilfried Tsonga
Summer Olympics	2012	Most games played in a set (48 games; Tsonga won third set 25–23)	Jo-Wilfried Tsonga
US Open	2014	Latest finish for a match: 2:26 a.m. (won by Kei Nishikori 4–6, 7–6, 6–7, 7–5, 6–4)	Philipp Kohlschreiber and John Isner (2012) Mats Wilander and Mikael Pernfors (1993)
ATP World Tour Finals	2016	Longest match: 3 hours and 38 minutes (won by Murray 5–7, 7–6^{(7–5)}, 7–6^{(11–9)})	Andy Murray
Queen's Club Championships	2024	Most aces served in a three-set match: 47 (Raonic won 6–7^{(6–8)}, 6–3, 7–6^{(11–9)})	Stands alone

== Awards ==
- 2011 – ATP Newcomer of the Year
- 2011 – Tennis Canada male player of the year
- 2012 – QMI Agency Canadian Male Athlete of the Year
- 2012 – Tennis Canada male player of the year
- 2013 – Tennis Canada male player of the year
- 2013 – Lionel Conacher Award
- 2014 – Emirates ATP Top 10 Trophy
- 2014 – Tennis Canada male player of the year
- 2014 – Lionel Conacher Award
- 2014 – Canadian Club of Toronto's Canadian of the Year
- 2015 – Tennis Canada male player of the year
- 2016 – Toronto Sports Hall of Honour male athlete of the year
- 2016 – Tennis Canada male player of the year

== See also ==
- List of Canadian sports personalities

== Sources ==
- Tennis Canada (2016). "2016 Tennis Canada Media Guide" (PDF). Archived from the original (PDF) on March 17, 2016.

Sporting positions
Preceded by (Spain) Rafael Nadal	US Open Series Champion; 2014	Succeeded by (United Kingdom) Andy Murray
Awards
Preceded by (Germany) Tobias Kamke	ATP Newcomer of the Year; 2011	Succeeded by (Slovakia) Martin Kližan
