= 2018 Mutua Madrid Open =

- Date: 5–13 May
- Edition: 17th
- Draw: 56S / 24D (men); 64S / 28D (women)
- Prize money: €6,200,860 (men) €6,045,855 (women)
- Surface: Clay
- Location: Madrid, Spain
- Venue: Park Manzanares

Champions

Men's singles
- (Germany) Alexander Zverev

Women's singles
- (Czech Republic) Petra Kvitová

Men's doubles
- (Croatia) Nikola Mektić / (Austria) Alexander Peya

Women's doubles
- (Russia) Ekaterina Makarova / (Russia) Elena Vesnina
| ← 2017 · | Madrid Open | · 2019 → |

The 2018 Mutua Madrid Open was a professional tennis tournament played on outdoor clay courts at the Park Manzanares in Madrid, Spain from 5–13 May 2018. It was the 17th edition of the event on the ATP World Tour and 10th on the WTA Tour. It was classified as an ATP World Tour Masters 1000 event on the 2018 ATP World Tour and a Premier Mandatory event on the 2018 WTA Tour.

== Points and prize money ==
=== Point distribution ===
| Event | W | F | SF | QF | Round of 16 | Round of 32 | Round of 64 | Q | Q2 | Q1 |
| Men's singles | 1000 | 600 | 360 | 180 | 90 | 45 | 10 | 25 | 16 | 0 |
| Men's doubles | 1000 | 600 | 360 | 180 | 90 | 10 | — | — | — | — |
| Women's singles | 1000 | 650 | 390 | 215 | 120 | 65 | 10 | 30 | 20 | 2 |
| Women's doubles | 1000 | 650 | 390 | 215 | 120 | 10 | — | — | — | — |

=== Prize money ===
| Event | W | F | SF | QF | Round of 16 | Round of 32 | Round of 64 | Q2 | Q1 |
| Men's singles | €1,190,490 | €583,725 | €293,780 | €149,390 | €77,575 | €40,900 | €22,080 | €5,090 | €2,595 |
| Women's singles | €1,190,490 | €583,725 | €293,780 | €149,390 | €77,575 | €36,775 | €17,275 | €4,775 | €2,325 |
| Men's doubles | €368,670 | €180,490 | €90,540 | €46,470 | €24,020 | €12,670 | — | — | — |
| Women's doubles | €368,670 | €180,490 | €90,540 | €46,470 | €23,500 | €12,100 | — | — | — |

== ATP singles main-draw entrants ==
=== Seeds ===
The following are the seeded players. Seedings are based on ATP rankings as of 30 April 2018. Rankings and points before are as of 7 May 2018.

| Seed | Rank | Player | Points before | Points defending | Points won | Points after | Status |
|---|---|---|---|---|---|---|---|
| 1 | 1 | (Spain) Rafael Nadal | 8,770 | 1,000 | 180 | 7,950 | Quarterfinals lost to (Austria) Dominic Thiem [5] |
| 2 | 3 | (Germany) Alexander Zverev | 5,195 | 180 | 1000 | 6,015 | Champion, defeated (Austria) Dominic Thiem [5] |
| 3 | 4 | (Bulgaria) Grigor Dimitrov | 4,950 | 90 | 10 | 4,870 | Second round lost to (Canada) Milos Raonic |
| 4 | 6 | (Argentina) Juan Martín del Potro | 4,470 | (20)^{‡} | 90 | 4,540 | Third round lost to (Serbia) Dušan Lajović [Q] |
| 5 | 7 | (Austria) Dominic Thiem | 3,545 | 600 | 600 | 3,545 | Runner-up, lost to (Germany) Alexander Zverev [2] |
| 6 | 8 | (South Africa) Kevin Anderson | 3,345 | (45)^{†} | 360 | 3,660 | Semifinals lost to (Austria) Dominic Thiem [5] |
| 7 | 9 | (United States) John Isner | 3,125 | 0 | 180 | 3,305 | Quarterfinals lost to (Germany) Alexander Zverev [2] |
| 8 | 10 | (Belgium) David Goffin | 3,020 | 180 | 90 | 2,930 | Third round lost to (United Kingdom) Kyle Edmund |
| 9 | 11 | (Spain) Pablo Carreño Busta | 2,280 | 10 | 10 | 2,280 | First round lost to (Croatia) Borna Ćorić |
| 10 | 12 | (Serbia) Novak Djokovic | 2,220 | 360 | 45 | 1,905 | Second round lost to (United Kingdom) Kyle Edmund |
| 11 | 14 | (Spain) Roberto Bautista Agut | 2,175 | 10 | 45 | 2,210 | Second round lost to (Germany) Philipp Kohlschreiber |
| 12 | 15 | (United States) Jack Sock | 2,155 | 10 | 10 | 2,155 | First round lost to (Uruguay) Pablo Cuevas |
| 13 | 16 | (Argentina) Diego Schwartzman | 2,085 | 45 | 90 | 2,130 | Third round lost to (Spain) Rafael Nadal [1] |
| 14 | 17 | (Czech Republic) Tomáš Berdych | 2,060 | 90 | 10 | 1,980 | First round lost to (France) Richard Gasquet |
| 15 | 18 | (France) Lucas Pouille | 1,995 | 10 | 10 | 1,995 | First round lost to (France) Benoît Paire |
| 16 | 19 | (Italy) Fabio Fognini | 1,840 | 45 | 10 | 1,805 | First round lost to (Argentina) Leonardo Mayer |

† The player did not qualify for the tournament in 2017. Accordingly, points for his 18th best result are deducted instead.
‡ The player used an exemption to skip the tournament in 2017. Accordingly, points for his 18th best result are deducted instead.

=== Withdrawals ===
The following players would have been seeded, but they withdrew from the event.

| Rank | Player | Points before | Points defending | Points after | Reason |
|---|---|---|---|---|---|
| 2 | (Switzerland) Roger Federer | 9,670 | 0 | 8,670 | Scheduling |
| 5 | (Croatia) Marin Čilić | 4,780 | 10 | 4,770 | Knee injury |
| 13 | (United States) Sam Querrey | 2,220 | 0 | 2,220 | Scheduling |

=== Other entrants ===
The following players received wildcards into the main draw:

- (Spain) Pablo Andújar
- (Spain) Roberto Carballés Baena
- (Spain) Guillermo García López
- (Greece) Stefanos Tsitsipas

The following players received entry from the qualifying draw:

- (Georgia (country)) Nikoloz Basilashvili
- (Romania) Marius Copil
- (Argentina) Federico Delbonis
- (Russia) Evgeny Donskoy
- (Argentina) Nicolás Kicker
- (Kazakhstan) Mikhail Kukushkin
- (Serbia) Dušan Lajović

=== Withdrawals ===
Before the tournament

- (Croatia) Marin Čilić → replaced by (France) Julien Benneteau
- (Switzerland) Roger Federer → replaced by (Canada) Denis Shapovalov
- (Spain) David Ferrer → replaced by (Germany) Jan-Lennard Struff
- (Serbia) Filip Krajinović → replaced by (Russia) Daniil Medvedev
- (Australia) Nick Kyrgios → replaced by (Germany) Mischa Zverev
- (Luxembourg) Gilles Müller → replaced by (Italy) Paolo Lorenzi
- (United Kingdom) Andy Murray → replaced by (France) Benoît Paire
- (United States) Sam Querrey → replaced by (United States) Jared Donaldson
- (Russia) Andrey Rublev → replaced by (United States) Tennys Sandgren
- (France) Jo-Wilfried Tsonga → replaced by (United States) Ryan Harrison
- (Switzerland) Stan Wawrinka → replaced by (Germany) Peter Gojowczyk

== ATP doubles main-draw entrants ==
=== Seeds ===
| Country | Player | Country | Player | Rank^{1} | Seed |
|---|---|---|---|---|---|
| POL | Łukasz Kubot | BRA | Marcelo Melo | 3 | 1 |
| USA | Bob Bryan | USA | Mike Bryan | 10 | 2 |
| FIN | Henri Kontinen | AUS | John Peers | 15 | 3 |
| FRA | Pierre-Hugues Herbert | FRA | Nicolas Mahut | 26 | 4 |
| GBR | Jamie Murray | BRA | Bruno Soares | 27 | 5 |
| COL | Juan Sebastián Cabal | COL | Robert Farah | 36 | 6 |
| CRO | Ivan Dodig | USA | Rajeev Ram | 37 | 7 |
| IND | Rohan Bopanna | FRA | Édouard Roger-Vasselin | 44 | 8 |

- Rankings are as of April 30, 2018.

=== Other entrants ===
The following pairs received wildcards into the doubles main draw:

- (Spain) David Marrero / (Spain) Fernando Verdasco
- (Romania) Florin Mergea / (Canada) Daniel Nestor

=== Retirements ===
- (United States) Bob Bryan (hip injury)

== WTA singles main-draw entrants ==
=== Seeds ===
The following are the seeded players. Seedings are based on WTA rankings as of 30 April 2018. Rankings and points before are as of 7 May 2018.

| Seed | Rank | Player | Points before | Points defending | Points won | Points after | Status |
|---|---|---|---|---|---|---|---|
| 1 | 1 | (Romania) Simona Halep | 8,055 | 1,000 | 215 | 7,270 | Quarterfinals lost to (Czech Republic) Karolína Plíšková [6] |
| 2 | 2 | (Denmark) Caroline Wozniacki | 6,790 | 65 | 120 | 6,845 | Third round lost to (Netherlands) Kiki Bertens |
| 3 | 3 | (Spain) Garbiñe Muguruza | 6,065 | 10 | 120 | 6,175 | Third round lost to (Russia) Daria Kasatkina [14] |
| 4 | 4 | (Ukraine) Elina Svitolina | 5,450 | 10 | 65 | 5,505 | Second round lost to (Spain) Carla Suárez Navarro |
| 5 | 5 | (Latvia) Jeļena Ostapenko | 5,273 | (1)^{†} | 10 | 5,282 | First round lost to (Romania) Irina-Camelia Begu |
| 6 | 6 | (Czech Republic) Karolína Plíšková | 5,100 | 65 | 390 | 5,425 | Semifinals lost to (Czech Republic) Petra Kvitová [10] |
| 7 | 7 | (France) Caroline Garcia | 4,700 | 10 | 390 | 5,080 | Semifinals lost to (Netherlands) Kiki Bertens |
| 8 | 8 | (United States) Venus Williams | 4,276 | 0 | 10 | 4,286 | First round lost to (Estonia) Anett Kontaveit |
| 9 | 9 | (United States) Sloane Stephens | 3,939 | 0 | 120 | 4,059 | Third round lost to (Czech Republic) Karolína Plíšková [6] |
| 10 | 10 | (Czech Republic) Petra Kvitová | 3,550 | 0 | 1000 | 4,550 | Champion, defeated (Netherlands) Kiki Bertens |
| 11 | 12 | (Germany) Julia Görges | 2,980 | 10 | 120 | 3,090 | Third round lost to (France) Caroline Garcia [7] |
| 12 | 13 | (United States) CoCo Vandeweghe | 2,738 | 215 | 10 | 2,533 | First round lost to (France) Kristina Mladenovic |
| 13 | 14 | (United States) Madison Keys | 2,722 | 10 | 10 | 2,722 | First round lost to (Spain) Sara Sorribes Tormo [WC] |
| 14 | 15 | (Russia) Daria Kasatkina | 2,570 | 10 | 215 | 2,775 | Quarterfinals lost to (Czech Republic) Petra Kvitová [10] |
| 15 | 17 | (Latvia) Anastasija Sevastova | 2,505 | 390 | 65 | 2,180 | Second round lost to (Netherlands) Kiki Bertens |
| 16 | 19 | (Slovakia) Magdaléna Rybáriková | 2,295 | (80)^{‡} | 10 | 2,225 | First round lost to (United Kingdom) Johanna Konta |

† The player did not qualify for the tournament in 2017. Accordingly, points for her 16th best result are deducted instead.
‡ The player did not qualify for the tournament in 2017, but was defending points from an ITF Women's Circuit tournament.

=== Other entrants ===
The following players received wildcards into the main draw:

- (Spain) Lara Arruabarrena
- (Spain) Georgina García Pérez
- (Ukraine) Marta Kostyuk
- (Puerto Rico) Monica Puig
- (Spain) Sara Sorribes Tormo

The following player received entry using a protected ranking:

- (Belarus) Victoria Azarenka

The following players received entry from the qualifying draw:

- (United States) Danielle Collins
- (Italy) Sara Errani
- (United States) Bernarda Pera
- (Czech Republic) Kristýna Plíšková
- (Belarus) Aryna Sabalenka
- (Slovakia) Anna Karolína Schmiedlová
- (Spain) Sílvia Soler Espinosa
- (Russia) Natalia Vikhlyantseva

=== Withdrawals ===
Before the tournament

- (Switzerland) Timea Bacsinszky → replaced by (Greece) Maria Sakkari
- (United States) Catherine Bellis → replaced by (Czech Republic) Kateřina Siniaková
- (Germany) Angelique Kerber → replaced by (Croatia) Donna Vekić
- (Poland) Agnieszka Radwańska → replaced by (Serbia) Aleksandra Krunić
- (Czech Republic) Lucie Šafářová → replaced by (Belgium) Alison Van Uytvanck
- (Germany) Laura Siegemund → replaced by (Kazakhstan) Zarina Diyas
- (United States) Serena Williams → replaced by (China) Wang Qiang

== WTA doubles main-draw entrants ==
=== Seeds ===
| Country | Player | Country | Player | Rank^{1} | Seed |
|---|---|---|---|---|---|
| RUS | Ekaterina Makarova | RUS | Elena Vesnina | 4 | 1 |
| CZE | Andrea Sestini Hlaváčková | CZE | Barbora Strýcová | 17 | 2 |
| HUN | Tímea Babos | FRA | Kristina Mladenovic | 19 | 3 |
| CAN | Gabriela Dabrowski | CHN | Xu Yifan | 26 | 4 |
| TPE | Latisha Chan | USA | Bethanie Mattek-Sands | 32 | 5 |
| CZE | Barbora Krejčiková | CZE | Kateřina Siniaková | 34 | 6 |
| SLO | Andreja Klepač | ESP | María José Martínez Sánchez | 36 | 7 |
| TPE | Chan Hao-ching | CHN | Yang Zhaoxuan | 39 | 8 |

- Rankings are as of April 30, 2018.

=== Other entrants ===
The following pairs received wildcards into the doubles main draw:

- (Romania) Sorana Cîrstea / (Spain) Sara Sorribes Tormo
- (Spain) Anabel Medina Garrigues / (Spain) Arantxa Parra Santonja

The following pairs received entry as alternates:

- (United States) Christina McHale / (China) Peng Shuai
- (Russia) Anastasia Pavlyuchenkova / (Ukraine) Olga Savchuk

=== Withdrawals ===
Before the tournament

- (Ukraine) Kateryna Bondarenko (head injury)
- (Belgium) Elise Mertens (gastrointestinal illness)
- (Latvia) Jeļena Ostapenko (abdominal injury)

== Champions ==
=== Men's singles ===
- (Germany) Alexander Zverev def. (Austria) Dominic Thiem, 6–4, 6–4

=== Women's singles ===
- (Czech Republic) Petra Kvitová def. (Netherlands) Kiki Bertens, 7–6^{(8–6)}, 4–6, 6–3

=== Men's doubles ===
- (Croatia) Nikola Mektić / (Austria) Alexander Peya def. (United States) Bob Bryan / (United States) Mike Bryan, 5–3, ret.

=== Women's doubles ===
- (Russia) Ekaterina Makarova / (Russia) Elena Vesnina def. (Hungary) Tímea Babos / (France) Kristina Mladenovic, 2–6, 6–4, [10–8]
