= 2017 Mutua Madrid Open =

- Date: 5–14 May
- Edition: 16th
- Draw: 56S / 24D (men); 64S / 28D (women)
- Prize money: €9,542,720
- Surface: Clay
- Location: Madrid, Spain
- Venue: Park Manzanares

Champions

Men's singles
- (Spain) Rafael Nadal

Women's singles
- (Romania) Simona Halep

Men's doubles
- (Poland) Łukasz Kubot / (Brazil) Marcelo Melo

Women's doubles
- (Chinese Taipei) Chan Yung-jan / (Switzerland) Martina Hingis
← 2016 ·	Madrid Open	· 2018 →

The 2017 Mutua Madrid Open was a professional tennis tournament played on outdoor clay courts at the Park Manzanares in Madrid, Spain from 5–14 May 2017. It was the 16th edition of the event on the ATP World Tour and 9th on the WTA Tour. It was classified as an ATP World Tour Masters 1000 event on the 2017 ATP World Tour and a Premier Mandatory event on the 2017 WTA Tour.

== Points and prize money ==
=== Point distribution ===
Event	W	F	SF	QF	Round of 16	Round of 32	Round of 64	Q	Q2	Q1
Men's singles	1000	600	360	180	90	45	10	25	16	0
Men's doubles	1000	600	360	180	90	10	—	—	—	—
Women's singles	1000	650	390	215	120	65	10	30	20	2
Women's doubles	1000	650	390	215	120	10	—	—	—	—

=== Prize money ===
Event	W	F	SF	QF	Round of 16	Round of 32	Round of 64	Q2	Q1
Men's singles	€1,043,680	€511,740	€257,555	€130,965	€68,010	€35,855	€19,360	€4,460	€2,270
Women's singles	€1,043,680	€511,740	€257,555	€130,965	€68,010	€32,260	€15,146	€4,166	€2,022
Men's doubles	€323,200	€158,240	€79,360	€40,740	€21,060	€11,110	—	—	—
Women's doubles	€323,200	€158,240	€79,360	€40,740	€20,606	€10,610	—	—	—

== ATP singles main-draw entrants ==
=== Seeds ===
The following are the seeded players. Seedings are based on ATP rankings as of 1 May 2017. Rankings and points before are as of 8 May 2017.

Because the tournament took place one week later than in 2016, the points defended from last year was not superseded within a 52-week run, the results during the 52-week period were from 2016 Italian Open.

Seed	Rank	Player	Points before	Points defending	Points won	Points after	Status
1	1	(United Kingdom) Andy Murray	11,270	1,000	90	10,360	Third round lost to (Croatia) Borna Ćorić [LL]
2	2	(Serbia) Novak Djokovic	7,085	600	360	6,845	Semifinals lost to (Spain) Rafael Nadal [4]
3	3	(Switzerland) Stan Wawrinka	5,685	90	10	5,605	Second round lost to (France) Benoît Paire
4	5	(Spain) Rafael Nadal	4,375	180	1,000	5,195	Champion, defeated (Austria) Dominic Thiem [8]
5	6	(Canada) Milos Raonic	4,135	45	90	4,180	Third round lost to (Belgium) David Goffin [9]
6	8	(Japan) Kei Nishikori	3,650	360	180	3,470	Quarterfinals withdrew due to right wrist pain
7	7	(Croatia) Marin Čilić	3,725	0	10	3,735	Second round lost to (Germany) Alexander Zverev
8	9	(Austria) Dominic Thiem	3,615	180	600	4,035	Runner-up, lost to (Spain) Rafael Nadal [4]
9	10	(Belgium) David Goffin	3,055	180	180	3,055	Quarterfinals lost to (Spain) Rafael Nadal [4]
10	11	(France) Jo-Wilfried Tsonga	2,825	0	45	2,870	Second round withdrew due to shoulder injury
11	14	(Czech Republic) Tomáš Berdych	2,690	90	90	2,690	Third round lost to (Germany) Alexander Zverev
12	12	(Bulgaria) Grigor Dimitrov	2,820	10	90	2,900	Third round lost to (Austria) Dominic Thiem [8]
13	13	(France) Lucas Pouille	2,696	376	10	2,330	First round lost to (France) Pierre-Hugues Herbert [Q]
14	15	(United States) Jack Sock	2,405	45	10	2,370	First round lost to (France) Nicolas Mahut
15	16	(France) Gaël Monfils	2,365	10	10	2,365	First round lost to (France) Gilles Simon
16	20	(Australia) Nick Kyrgios	2,155	90	90	2,155	Third round lost to (Spain) Rafael Nadal [4]

=== Other entrants ===
The following players received wildcards into the main draw:

- (Spain) Nicolás Almagro
- (Romania) Marius Copil
- (Spain) Guillermo García López
- (Spain) Tommy Robredo

The following player received entry using a protected ranking:

- (Germany) Tommy Haas

The following players received entry from the qualifying draw:

- (Brazil) Thomaz Bellucci
- (United States) Ernesto Escobedo
- (France) Pierre-Hugues Herbert
- (Uzbekistan) Denis Istomin
- (Kazakhstan) Mikhail Kukushkin
- (Russia) Andrey Kuznetsov
- (France) Adrian Mannarino

The following players received entry as lucky losers:

- (Croatia) Borna Ćorić
- (United States) Jared Donaldson

=== Withdrawals ===
Before the tournament

- (Argentina) Juan Martín del Potro →replaced by (France) Nicolas Mahut
- (Switzerland) Roger Federer →replaced by (United States) Ryan Harrison
- (France) Richard Gasquet →replaced by (Croatia) Borna Ćorić
- (United States) John Isner →replaced by (Netherlands) Robin Haase
- (United States) Steve Johnson →replaced by (United States) Jared Donaldson
- (Italy) Paolo Lorenzi →replaced by (Cyprus) Marcos Baghdatis
- (United States) Sam Querrey →replaced by (Germany) Florian Mayer
- (Serbia) Viktor Troicki →replaced by (Russia) Karen Khachanov

During the tournament

- (Japan) Kei Nishikori
- (France) Jo-Wilfried Tsonga

== ATP doubles main-draw entrants ==
=== Seeds ===
Country	Player	Country	Player	Rank^{1}	Seed
FIN	Henri Kontinen	AUS	John Peers	3	1
USA	Bob Bryan	USA	Mike Bryan	6	2
GBR	Jamie Murray	BRA	Bruno Soares	15	3
POL	Łukasz Kubot	BRA	Marcelo Melo	18	4
RSA	Raven Klaasen	USA	Rajeev Ram	23	5
FRA	Nicolas Mahut	FRA	Édouard Roger-Vasselin	26	6
CRO	Ivan Dodig	ESP	Marcel Granollers	27	7
ESP	Feliciano López	ESP	Marc López	29	8

- Rankings are as of May 1, 2017.

=== Other entrants ===
The following pairs received wildcards into the doubles main draw:

- (Spain) David Marrero / (Spain) Tommy Robredo
- (Spain) Fernando Verdasco / (Serbia) Nenad Zimonjić

The following pairs received entry as alternates:

- (United States) Brian Baker / (United States) Nicholas Monroe
- (Colombia) Juan Sebastián Cabal / (Colombia) Robert Farah

=== Withdrawals ===
Before the tournament

- (Spain) Pablo Carreño Busta
- (France) Lucas Pouille

During the tournament

- (Australia) Nick Kyrgios

== WTA singles main-draw entrants ==
=== Seeds ===
The following are the seeded players. Seedings are based on WTA rankings as of 1 May 2017. Rankings and points before are as of 8 May 2017.

Because the tournament took place one week later than in 2016, the points defended from last year was not superseded within a 52-week run, the results during the 52-week period were from 2016 Italian Open.

Seed	Rank	Player	Points before	Points defending	Points won	Points after	Status
1	2	(Germany) Angelique Kerber	6,945	30	120	7,035	Third round retired against (Canada) Eugenie Bouchard
2	3	(Czech Republic) Karolína Plíšková	5,946	1	65	6,010	Second round lost to (Latvia) Anastasija Sevastova
3	8	(Romania) Simona Halep	4,206	1	1,000	5,205	Champion, defeated (France) Kristina Mladenovic
4	5	(Slovakia) Dominika Cibulková	4,475	(60)	65	4,480	Second round lost to (France) Océane Dodin [Q]
5	4	(Spain) Garbiñe Muguruza	4,627	350	10	4,287	First round lost to (Switzerland) Timea Bacsinszky
6	6	(United Kingdom) Johanna Konta	4,425	105	10	4,330	First round lost to (Germany) Laura Siegemund
~~7~~	~~7~~	~~(Poland) Agnieszka Radwańska~~	4,255	(60)	0	4,195	Withdrew due to right foot injury
8	9	(Russia) Svetlana Kuznetsova	4,060	190	390	4,260	Semifinals lost to (France) Kristina Mladenovic [14]
9	13	(United States) Madison Keys	3,737	585	10	3,162	First round lost to (Japan) Misaki Doi
10	11	(Denmark) Caroline Wozniacki	3,910	(60)	65	3,915	Second round lost to (Spain) Carla Suárez Navarro
11	10	(Ukraine) Elina Svitolina	3,955	185	10	3,780	First round lost to (China) Zheng Saisai [Q]
12	14	(Russia) Elena Vesnina	2,885	(20)	10	2,875	First round lost to (Romania) Irina-Camelia Begu
13	16	(Russia) Anastasia Pavlyuchenkova	2,635	55	10	2,590	First round lost to (Romania) Sorana Cîrstea [WC]
14	17	(France) Kristina Mladenovic	2,375	(60)	650	2,965	Runner-up, lost to (Romania) Simona Halep [3]
15	18	(Czech Republic) Barbora Strýcová	2,175	190	65	2,040	Second round lost to (Spain) Lara Arruabarrena [WC]
16	26	(Australia) Samantha Stosur	1,665	60	120	1,725	Third round lost to (Romania) Simona Halep [3]
17	21	(Croatia) Mirjana Lučić-Baroni	1,830	(1)	10	1,839	First round lost to (Russia) Maria Sharapova [WC]

=== Other entrants ===
The following players received wildcards into the main draw:

- (Spain) Lara Arruabarrena
- (Romania) Sorana Cîrstea
- (Italy) Francesca Schiavone
- (Russia) Maria Sharapova
- (Spain) Sara Sorribes Tormo

The following players received entry from the qualifying draw:

- (France) Océane Dodin
- (Colombia) Mariana Duque Mariño
- (Sweden) Johanna Larsson
- (France) Pauline Parmentier
- (Germany) Andrea Petkovic
- (Croatia) Donna Vekić
- (China) Wang Qiang
- (China) Zheng Saisai

The following player received entry as a lucky loser:

- (Estonia) Anett Kontaveit

=== Withdrawals ===
Before the tournament

- (Czech Republic) Petra Kvitová →replaced by (Switzerland) Viktorija Golubic
- (Japan) Naomi Osaka →replaced by (United States) Catherine Bellis
- (Poland) Agnieszka Radwańska →replaced by (Estonia) Anett Kontaveit
- (United States) Serena Williams →replaced by (Serbia) Jelena Janković
- (United States) Venus Williams →replaced by (Canada) Eugenie Bouchard

=== Retirements ===
- (Germany) Angelique Kerber
- (Croatia) Ana Konjuh

== WTA doubles main-draw entrants ==
=== Seeds ===
Country	Player	Country	Player	Rank^{1}	Seed
USA	Bethanie Mattek-Sands	CZE	Lucie Šafářová	3	1
RUS	Ekaterina Makarova	RUS	Elena Vesnina	6	2
TPE	Chan Yung-jan	SUI	Martina Hingis	19	3
IND	Sania Mirza	KAZ	Yaroslava Shvedova	20	4
HUN	Tímea Babos	CZE	Andrea Hlaváčková	23	5
CZE	Lucie Hradecká	CZE	Kateřina Siniaková	34	6
GER	Julia Görges	CZE	Barbora Strýcová	36	7
USA	Abigail Spears	SLO	Katarina Srebotnik	40	8

- Rankings are as of May 1, 2017.

=== Other entrants ===
The following pairs received wildcards into the doubles main draw:

- (Spain) Lara Arruabarrena / (Spain) Sara Sorribes Tormo
- (United Kingdom) Johanna Konta / (United States) Shelby Rogers
- (Spain) Arantxa Parra Santonja / (Spain) Sílvia Soler Espinosa

== Champions ==
=== Men's singles ===
- (Spain) Rafael Nadal def. (Austria) Dominic Thiem, 7–6^{(10–8)}, 6–4

=== Women's singles ===
- (Romania) Simona Halep def. (France) Kristina Mladenovic, 7–5, 6–7^{(5–7)}, 6–2

=== Men's doubles ===
- (Poland) Łukasz Kubot / (Brazil) Marcelo Melo def. (France) Nicolas Mahut / (France) Édouard Roger-Vasselin, 7–5, 6–3

=== Women's doubles ===
- (Chinese Taipei) Chan Yung-jan / (Switzerland) Martina Hingis def. (Hungary) Tímea Babos / (Czech Republic) Andrea Hlaváčková, 6–4, 6–3
