= 2015 Sacramento Challenger =

- Date: 3 October – 1 October
- Edition: 11th
- Surface: Hard
- Location: Sacramento, California, United States

Champions

Singles
- (United States) Taylor Fritz

Doubles
- (Slovenia) Blaž Kavčič / (Slovenia) Grega Žemlja
- Sacramento Challenger

The 2015 Sacramento Challenger was a professional tennis tournament played on hard courts. It was the 11th edition of the tournament which was part of the 2015 ATP Challenger Tour. It took place in Sacramento, California, United States between 3 October and 11 October 2015.

== Singles main-draw entrants ==
=== Seeds ===
Country	Player	Rank^{1}	Seed
USA	Denis Kudla	73	1
GBR	Kyle Edmund	100	2
GER	Dustin Brown	105	3
USA	Tim Smyczek	112	4
SLO	Blaž Rola	138	5
USA	Dennis Novikov	144	6
USA	Jared Donaldson	150	7
SLO	Blaž Kavčič	163	8

- ^{1} Rankings are as of September 28, 2015.

=== Other entrants ===
The following players received wildcards into the singles main draw:

- (United States) Sekou Bangoura
- (United States) Taylor Fritz
- (United States) Alex Kuznetsov
- (Australia) Matt Reid

The following player received entry as into the singles main draw with a protected ranking:

- (Canada) Peter Polansky

The following players received entry into the singles main draw as a special exempt:

- (United States) Mackenzie McDonald

The following players entered as alternates:

- (Czech Republic) Marek Michalička
- (United States) Frances Tiafoe

The following players received entry from the qualifying draw:

- (United States) Marcos Giron
- (United States) Nicolas Meister
- (Denmark) Frederik Nielsen
- (United States) Tommy Paul

== Champions ==
=== Singles ===
- (United States) Taylor Fritz def. (United States) Jared Donaldson, 6–4, 3–6, 6–4

=== Doubles ===
- (Slovenia) Blaž Kavčič / (Slovenia) Grega Žemlja def. (Germany) Dustin Brown / (Germany) Daniel Brands, 6–1, 3–6, [10–3]
