= 2018 Mutua Madrid Open – Women's singles =

Women's singles
- 2018 Mutua Madrid Open

Final
- Champion: (Czech Republic) Petra Kvitová
- Runner-up: (Netherlands) Kiki Bertens
- Score: 7–6^{(8–6)}, 4–6, 6–3

Events
Singles	men	women
Doubles	men	women
← 2017 ·	Mutua Madrid Open	· 2019 →

Petra Kvitová defeated Kiki Bertens in the final, 7–6^{(8–6)}, 4–6, 6–3 to win the women's singles tennis title at the 2018 Madrid Open. It was Kvitová's third Madrid Open title, and she became the first player to win three women's singles titles at the Madrid Open.

Simona Halep was the two-time defending champion, but lost to Karolína Plíšková in the quarterfinals.

Halep and Caroline Wozniacki were in contention for the WTA no. 1 singles ranking at the beginning of the tournament. Halep retained the top ranking when Wozniacki lost to Bertens in the third round.

== Seeds ==
1. (Romania) Simona Halep (quarterfinals)
2. (Denmark) Caroline Wozniacki (third round)
3. (Spain) Garbiñe Muguruza (third round)
4. (Ukraine) Elina Svitolina (second round)
5. (Latvia) Jeļena Ostapenko (first round)
6. (Czech Republic) Karolína Plíšková (semifinals)
7. (France) Caroline Garcia (semifinals)
8. (United States) Venus Williams (first round)

9. (United States) Sloane Stephens (third round)
10. (Czech Republic) Petra Kvitová (champion)
11. (Germany) Julia Görges (third round)
12. (United States) CoCo Vandeweghe (first round)
13. (United States) Madison Keys (first round)
14. (Russia) Daria Kasatkina (quarterfinals)
15. (Latvia) Anastasija Sevastova (second round)
16. (Slovakia) Magdaléna Rybáriková (first round)

Click on the seed number of a player to go to their draw section.

== Draw ==
=== Key ===
- Q = Qualifier
- WC = Wild card
- LL = Lucky loser
- Alt = Alternate
- SE = Special exempt
- PR = Protected ranking
- ITF = ITF entry
- JE = Junior exempt
- w/o = Walkover
- r = Retired
- d = Defaulted
- SR = Special ranking

=== Finals ===
Quarterfinals
1	(Romania) Simona Halep	4	3
6	(Czech Republic) Karolína Plíšková	6	6
14	(Russia) Daria Kasatkina	4	0
10	(Czech Republic) Petra Kvitová	6	6
7	(France) Caroline Garcia	6	6
(Spain) Carla Suárez Navarro	2	3
(Russia) Maria Sharapova	6	2	3
(Netherlands) Kiki Bertens	4	6	6

Semifinals
6	(Czech Republic) Karolína Plíšková	6^{4}	3
10	(Czech Republic) Petra Kvitová	7^{7}	6
7	(France) Caroline Garcia	2	2
(Netherlands) Kiki Bertens	6	6

Final
10	(Czech Republic) Petra Kvitová	7^{8}	4	6
(Netherlands) Kiki Bertens	6^{6}	6	3

=== Top half ===
==== Section 1 ====
First round
1	(Romania) S Halep	6	6
(Russia) E Makarova	1	0
(Belgium) A Van Uytvanck	4	4
(Belgium) E Mertens	6	6
Q	(Czech Republic) Kr Plíšková	6	6
Q	(Russia) N Vikhlyantseva	4	4
WC	(Spain) S Sorribes Tormo	7	6
13	(United States) M Keys	5	2
9	(United States) S Stephens	6	6
Q	(Spain) S Soler Espinosa	3	2
(Australia) S Stosur	6	6^{2}	6
(Russia) A Pavlyuchenkova	1	7^{7}	3
(Serbia) A Krunić	3	3
PR	(Belarus) V Azarenka	6	6
(Russia) E Vesnina	4	2
6	(Czech Republic) Ka Plíšková	6	6

Second round
1	(Romania) S Halep	6	6
(Belgium) E Mertens	0	3
Q	(Czech Republic) Kr Plíšková	7	6
WC	(Spain) S Sorribes Tormo	5	2
9	(United States) S Stephens	6	6
(Australia) S Stosur	1	3
PR	(Belarus) V Azarenka	2	6	5
6	(Czech Republic) Ka Plíšková	6	1	7

Third round
1	(Romania) S Halep	6	6
Q	(Czech Republic) Kr Plíšková	1	4
9	(United States) S Stephens	2	3
6	(Czech Republic) Ka Plíšková	6	6

Quarterfinals
1	(Romania) S Halep	4	3
6	(Czech Republic) Ka Plíšková	6	6

==== Section 2 ====
First round
3	(Spain) G Muguruza	6	6
(China) S Peng	4	2
(Croatia) D Vekić	6	6
WC	(Spain) G García Pérez	2	4
(Romania) S Cîrstea	6	2	6
(Czech Republic) K Siniaková	4	6	4
(China) Q Wang	5	6^{6}
14	(Russia) D Kasatkina	7	7^{8}
10	(Czech Republic) P Kvitová	6	6
(Ukraine) L Tsurenko	1	2
WC	(Puerto Rico) M Puig	6	2	6
(Kazakhstan) Z Diyas	4	6	2
Q	(United States) D Collins	5	2
(Belarus) A Sasnovich	7	6
(Estonia) A Kontaveit	3	6	6
8	(United States) V Williams	6	3	2

Second round
3	(Spain) G Muguruza	2	6	6
(Croatia) D Vekić	6	4	1
(Romania) S Cîrstea	3	1
14	(Russia) D Kasatkina	6	6
10	(Czech Republic) P Kvitová	6	7^{10}
WC	(Puerto Rico) M Puig	3	6^{8}
(Belarus) A Sasnovich	2	6	2
(Estonia) A Kontaveit	6	4	6

Third round
3	(Spain) G Muguruza	2	6	3
14	(Russia) D Kasatkina	6	4	6
10	(Czech Republic) P Kvitová	6^{4}	6	6
(Estonia) A Kontaveit	7^{7}	3	3

Quarterfinals
14	(Russia) D Kasatkina	4	0
10	(Czech Republic) P Kvitová	6	6

=== Bottom half ===
==== Section 3 ====
First round
7	(France) C Garcia	6	7
(Slovakia) D Cibulková	1	5
(Croatia) P Martić	6	6
(Russia) S Kuznetsova	4	2
WC	(Ukraine) M Kostyuk	3	6	2
WC	(Spain) L Arruabarrena	6	4	6
(Hungary) T Babos	2	4
11	(Germany) J Görges	6	6
16	(Slovakia) M Rybáriková	3	5
(United Kingdom) J Konta	6	7
Q	(Belarus) A Sabalenka	4	6	3
Q	(United States) B Pera	6	2	6
(Czech Republic) B Strýcová	3	3
(Spain) C Suárez Navarro	6	6
(France) A Cornet	2	2
4	(Ukraine) E Svitolina	6	6

Second round
7	(France) C Garcia	6	7
(Croatia) P Martić	3	5
WC	(Spain) L Arruabarrena	6	4	2
11	(Germany) J Görges	2	6	6
(United Kingdom) J Konta	4	3
Q	(United States) B Pera	6	6
(Spain) C Suárez Navarro	2	7^{7}	6
4	(Ukraine) E Svitolina	6	6^{3}	4

Third round
7	(France) C Garcia	6	6
11	(Germany) J Görges	2	4
Q	(United States) B Pera	6	2	4
(Spain) C Suárez Navarro	2	6	6

Quarterfinals
7	(France) C Garcia	6	6
(Spain) C Suárez Navarro	2	3

==== Section 4 ====
First round
5	(Latvia) J Ostapenko	3	3
(Romania) I-C Begu	6	6
(Romania) M Buzărnescu	4	1
(Russia) M Sharapova	6	6
(China) S Zhang	6	7
(Japan) N Osaka	1	5
(France) K Mladenovic	7	6
12	(United States) C Vandeweghe	5	0
15	(Latvia) A Sevastova	6	4	6
Q	(Slovakia) AK Schmiedlová	3	6	3
(Netherlands) K Bertens	6	6
(Greece) M Sakkari	4	4
Q	(Italy) S Errani	1	4
(Australia) A Barty	6	6
(Australia) D Gavrilova	3	1
2	(Denmark) C Wozniacki	6	6

Second round
(Romania) I-C Begu	5	1
(Russia) M Sharapova	7	6
(China) S Zhang	4	6	3
(France) K Mladenovic	6	4	6
15	(Latvia) A Sevastova	1	4
(Netherlands) K Bertens	6	6
(Australia) A Barty	2	6	4
2	(Denmark) C Wozniacki	6	4	6

Third round
(Russia) M Sharapova	6	6
(France) K Mladenovic	3	4
(Netherlands) K Bertens	6	6
2	(Denmark) C Wozniacki	2	2

Quarterfinals
(Russia) M Sharapova	6	2	3
(Netherlands) K Bertens	4	6	6

== Qualifying ==
=== Seeds ===
1. (United States) Danielle Collins (qualified)
2. (Belarus) Aryna Sabalenka (qualified)
3. (Chinese Taipei) Hsieh Su-wei (withdrew, still playing in Rabat)
4. (Slovenia) Polona Hercog (first round)
5. (Brazil) Beatriz Haddad Maia (first round)
6. (Germany) Mona Barthel (qualifying competition, retired)
7. (Romania) Ana Bogdan (qualifying competition)
8. (Poland) Magda Linette (qualifying competition)
9. (Belgium) Kirsten Flipkens (qualifying competition)
10. (Czech Republic) Kristýna Plíšková (qualified)
11. (Ukraine) Kateryna Bondarenko (first round)
12. (United States) Sachia Vickery (qualifying competition)
13. (United States) Jennifer Brady (first round)
14. (Sweden) Johanna Larsson (qualifying competition)
15. (Russia) Natalia Vikhlyantseva (qualified)
16. (Slovakia) Anna Karolína Schmiedlová (qualified)

=== Qualifiers ===
1. (United States) Danielle Collins
2. (Belarus) Aryna Sabalenka
3. (Slovakia) Anna Karolína Schmiedlová
4. (United States) Bernarda Pera
5. (Italy) Sara Errani
6. (Spain) Sílvia Soler Espinosa
7. (Czech Republic) Kristýna Plíšková
8. (Russia) Natalia Vikhlyantseva

=== Draw ===
==== First qualifier ====
First round
1	(United States) Danielle Collins	7^{7}	3	7^{7}
(United States) Alison Riske	6^{2}	6	6^{3}
(Japan) Shuko Aoyama	3	3
14	(Sweden) Johanna Larsson	6	6

Qualifying competition
1	(United States) Danielle Collins	6	6
14	(Sweden) Johanna Larsson	3	1

==== Second qualifier ====
First round
2	(Belarus) Aryna Sabalenka	6	7^{7}
WC	(Spain) Carlota Martínez Círez	1	6^{5}
WC	(Serbia) Olga Danilović	3	7^{7}	6
11	(Ukraine) Kateryna Bondarenko	6	6^{2}	2

Qualifying competition
2	(Belarus) Aryna Sabalenka	6	6
WC	(Serbia) Olga Danilović	4	2

==== Third qualifier ====
First round
Alt	(United States) Bethanie Mattek-Sands	4	7^{7}	6
(United States) Caroline Dolehide	6	6^{1}	1
Alt	(Canada) Gabriela Dabrowski	3	5
16	(Slovakia) Anna Karolína Schmiedlová	6	7

Qualifying competition
Alt	(United States) Bethanie Mattek-Sands	6	2	5
16	(Slovakia) Anna Karolína Schmiedlová	4	6	7

==== Fourth qualifier ====
First round
4	(Slovenia) Polona Hercog	2	0
(United States) Bernarda Pera	6	6
(Czech Republic) Barbora Krejčíková	6	4	2
12	(United States) Sachia Vickery	2	6	6

Qualifying competition
(United States) Bernarda Pera	6	6
12	(United States) Sachia Vickery	4	4

==== Fifth qualifier ====
First round
5	(Brazil) Beatriz Haddad Maia	4	6^{5}
(Italy) Sara Errani	6	7^{7}
(United States) Christina McHale	6^{8}	2
9	(Belgium) Kirsten Flipkens	7^{10}	6

Qualifying competition
(Italy) Sara Errani	5	6	6
9	(Belgium) Kirsten Flipkens	7	1	0

==== Sixth qualifier ====
First round
6	(Germany) Mona Barthel	6	6
(Russia) Alla Kudryavtseva	3	1
(Spain) Sílvia Soler Espinosa	6	6
13	(United States) Jennifer Brady	2	4

Qualifying competition
6	(Germany) Mona Barthel	2	0^{r}
(Spain) Sílvia Soler Espinosa	6	2

==== Seventh qualifier ====
First round
7	(Romania) Ana Bogdan	6	4	6
(Japan) Miyu Kato	1	6	0
WC	(Romania) Irina Bara	1	2
10	(Czech Republic) Kristýna Plíšková	6	6

Qualifying competition
7	(Romania) Ana Bogdan	6	5	2
10	(Czech Republic) Kristýna Plíšková	3	7	6

==== Eighth qualifier ====
First round
8	(Poland) Magda Linette	6	6
(United States) Sofia Kenin	3	4
WC	(Spain) Paula Badosa Gibert	2	4
15	(Russia) Natalia Vikhlyantseva	6	6

Qualifying competition
8	(Poland) Magda Linette	5	7^{10}	6^{2}
15	(Russia) Natalia Vikhlyantseva	7	6^{8}	7^{7}
