= 2018 Mutua Madrid Open – Women's doubles =

Women's doubles
- 2018 Mutua Madrid Open

Final
- Champions: (Russia) Ekaterina Makarova (Russia) Elena Vesnina
- Runners-up: (Hungary) Tímea Babos (France) Kristina Mladenovic
- Score: 2–6, 6–4, [10–8]

Events
Singles	men	women
Doubles	men	women
← 2017 ·	Mutua Madrid Open	· 2019 →

Latisha Chan and Martina Hingis were the defending champions, but Hingis retired from professional tennis at the end of 2017. Chan played alongside Bethanie Mattek-Sands, but lost in the quarterfinals to Andrea Sestini Hlaváčková and Barbora Strýcová.

Ekaterina Makarova and Elena Vesnina won the title, defeating Tímea Babos and Kristina Mladenovic in the final, 2–6, 6–4, [10–8].

== Seeds ==
The top four seeds received a bye into the second round.

1. (Russia) Ekaterina Makarova / (Russia) Elena Vesnina (champions)
2. (Czech Republic) Andrea Sestini Hlaváčková / (Czech Republic) Barbora Strýcová (semifinals)
3. (Hungary) Tímea Babos / (France) Kristina Mladenovic (final)
4. (Canada) Gabriela Dabrowski / (China) Xu Yifan (second round)
5. (Chinese Taipei) Latisha Chan / (United States) Bethanie Mattek-Sands (quarterfinals)
6. (Czech Republic) Barbora Krejčíková / (Czech Republic) Kateřina Siniaková (second round)
7. (Slovenia) Andreja Klepač / (Spain) María José Martínez Sánchez (semifinals)
8. (Chinese Taipei) Chan Hao-ching / (China) Yang Zhaoxuan (second round)

== Draw ==
=== Key ===
- Q = Qualifier
- WC = Wild card
- LL = Lucky loser
- Alt = Alternate
- SE = Special exempt
- PR = Protected ranking
- ITF = ITF entry
- JE = Junior exempt
- w/o = Walkover
- r = Retired
- d = Defaulted
- SR = Special ranking

=== Finals ===
Semifinals
1	(Russia) Ekaterina Makarova (Russia) Elena Vesnina	7^{7}	7^{7}
7	(Slovenia) Andreja Klepač (Spain) María José Martínez Sánchez	6^{4}	6^{4}
3	(Hungary) Tímea Babos (France) Kristina Mladenovic	6	3	[10]
2	(Czech Republic) Andrea Sestini Hlaváčková (Czech Republic) Barbora Strýcová	2	6	[8]

Final
1	(Russia) Ekaterina Makarova (Russia) Elena Vesnina	2	6	[10]
3	(Hungary) Tímea Babos (France) Kristina Mladenovic	6	4	[8]

=== Top half ===
First round
(Netherlands) K Bertens (Sweden) J Larsson	3	4
(Australia) D Gavrilova (Chinese Taipei) S-w Hsieh	6	6
(Spain) L Arruabarrena (Slovenia) K Srebotnik	5	5
(Poland) A Rosolska (United States) A Spears	7	7
(Russia) A Kudryavtseva (Czech Republic) R Voráčová	6	4	[4]
8	(Chinese Taipei) H-c Chan (China) Z Yang	1	6	[10]
WC	(Spain) A Medina Garrigues (Spain) A Parra Santonja	6	3	[3]
(United Kingdom) J Konta (China) S Zhang	2	6	[10]
(Belgium) E Mertens (Netherlands) D Schuurs
Alt	(Russia) A Pavlyuchenkova (Ukraine) O Savchuk	w/o
(Romania) M Buzărnescu (France) A Cornet	2	4
7	(Slovenia) A Klepač (Spain) MJ Martínez Sánchez	6	6

Second round
1	(Russia) E Makarova (Russia) E Vesnina	6	6
(Australia) D Gavrilova (Chinese Taipei) S-w Hsieh	4	4
(Poland) A Rosolska (United States) A Spears	7^{7}	6
8	(Chinese Taipei) H-c Chan (China) Z Yang	6^{3}	3
4	(Canada) G Dabrowski (China) Y Xu	3	6	[11]
(United Kingdom) J Konta (China) S Zhang	6	1	[13]
Alt	(Russia) A Pavlyuchenkova (Ukraine) O Savchuk	1	6	[7]
7	(Slovenia) A Klepač (Spain) MJ Martínez Sánchez	6	3	[10]

Quarterfinals
1	(Russia) E Makarova (Russia) E Vesnina	6^{5}	7^{7}	[10]
(Poland) A Rosolska (United States) A Spears	7^{7}	6^{3}	[4]
(United Kingdom) J Konta (China) S Zhang	4	2
7	(Slovenia) A Klepač (Spain) MJ Martínez Sánchez	6	6

Semifinals
1	(Russia) E Makarova (Russia) E Vesnina	7^{7}	7^{7}
7	(Slovenia) A Klepač (Spain) MJ Martínez Sánchez	6^{4}	6^{4}

=== Bottom half ===
First round
6	(Czech Republic) B Krejčíková (Czech Republic) K Siniaková	6	6
(Australia) M Adamczak (Ukraine) L Kichenok	2	2
(Australia) A Barty (United States) C Vandeweghe	6	7^{7}
(Japan) S Aoyama (Japan) M Kato	1	6^{3}
(United States) N Melichar (Czech Republic) K Peschke	2	6	[11]
(Romania) I-C Begu (Romania) S Halep	6	3	[9]
5	(Chinese Taipei) L Chan (United States) B Mattek-Sands	6	6
Alt	(United States) C McHale (China) S Peng	4	1
WC	(Romania) S Cîrstea (Spain) S Sorribes Tormo	3	5
(Germany) J Görges (Czech Republic) Ka Plíšková	6	7
(United States) R Atawo (Germany) A-L Grönefeld	2	4
(Ukraine) N Kichenok (Australia) An Rodionova	6	6

Second round
6	(Czech Republic) B Krejčíková (Czech Republic) K Siniaková	0	1
(Australia) A Barty (United States) C Vandeweghe	6	6
(United States) N Melichar (Czech Republic) K Peschke	4	1
3	(Hungary) T Babos (France) K Mladenovic	6	6
5	(Chinese Taipei) L Chan (United States) B Mattek-Sands	6	7^{7}
(Germany) J Görges (Czech Republic) Ka Plíšková	3	6^{3}
(Ukraine) N Kichenok (Australia) An Rodionova	6^{2}	1
2	(Czech Republic) A Sestini Hlaváčková (Czech Republic) B Strýcová	7^{7}	6

Quarterfinals
(Australia) A Barty (United States) C Vandeweghe	5	6	[9]
3	(Hungary) T Babos (France) K Mladenovic	7	3	[11]
5	(Chinese Taipei) L Chan (United States) B Mattek-Sands	4	6	[6]
2	(Czech Republic) A Sestini Hlaváčková (Czech Republic) B Strýcová	6	1	[10]

Semifinals
3	(Hungary) T Babos (France) K Mladenovic	6	3	[10]
2	(Czech Republic) A Sestini Hlaváčková (Czech Republic) B Strýcová	2	6	[8]
