= 2018 Mutua Madrid Open – Men's doubles =

Men's doubles
- 2018 Mutua Madrid Open

Final
- Champions: (Croatia) Nikola Mektić (Austria) Alexander Peya
- Runners-up: (United States) Bob Bryan (United States) Mike Bryan
- Score: 5–3, ret.

Events
Singles	men	women
Doubles	men	women
← 2017 ·	Mutua Madrid Open	· 2019 →

Nikola Mektić and Alexander Peya defeated Bob and Mike Bryan in the final, 5–3, after Bob Bryan retired due to a hip injury. The Bryan brothers would have regained the ATP no. 1 doubles ranking from Kubot and Melo if they had won the title. This was their first retirement as a team in 1,407 matches.

Łukasz Kubot and Marcelo Melo were the defending champions, but lost to Juan Sebastián Cabal and Robert Farah in the quarterfinals.

== Seeds ==
All seeds received a bye into the second round.

1. (Poland) Łukasz Kubot / (Brazil) Marcelo Melo (quarterfinals)
2. (United States) Bob Bryan / (United States) Mike Bryan (final, retired)
3. (Finland) Henri Kontinen / (Australia) John Peers (second round)
4. (France) Pierre-Hugues Herbert / (France) Nicolas Mahut (semifinals)
5. (United Kingdom) Jamie Murray / (Brazil) Bruno Soares (quarterfinals)
6. (Colombia) Juan Sebastián Cabal / (Colombia) Robert Farah (semifinals)
7. (Croatia) Ivan Dodig / (United States) Rajeev Ram (second round)
8. (India) Rohan Bopanna / (France) Édouard Roger-Vasselin (second round)

== Draw ==
=== Key ===
- Q = Qualifier
- WC = Wild card
- LL = Lucky loser
- Alt = Alternate
- SE = Special exempt
- PR = Protected ranking
- ITF = ITF entry
- JE = Junior exempt
- w/o = Walkover
- r = Retired
- d = Defaulted
- SR = Special ranking

=== Finals ===
Semifinals
6	(Colombia) Juan Sebastián Cabal (Colombia) Robert Farah	3	6	[3]
(Croatia) Nikola Mektić (Austria) Alexander Peya	6	3	[10]
4	(France) Pierre-Hugues Herbert (France) Nicolas Mahut	1	6^{2}
2	(United States) Bob Bryan (United States) Mike Bryan	6	7^{7}

Final
(Croatia) Nikola Mektić (Austria) Alexander Peya	5
2	(United States) Bob Bryan (United States) Mike Bryan	3^{r}

=== Top half ===
First round
(Uruguay) P Cuevas (Spain) M Granollers	6	7^{10}
(Argentina) JM del Potro (Austria) D Thiem	3	6^{8}
(Italy) F Fognini (Argentina) D Schwartzman	3	6	[10]
WC	(Romania) F Mergea (Canada) D Nestor	6	1	[4]
(South Africa) K Anderson (Belarus) M Mirnyi	4	6	[4]
(Croatia) N Mektić (Austria) A Peya	6	3	[10]
(South Africa) R Klaasen (New Zealand) M Venus	3	7	[10]
(Spain) F López (Spain) M López	6	5	[8]

Second round
1	(Poland) Ł Kubot (Brazil) M Melo	7	7^{12}
(Uruguay) P Cuevas (Spain) M Granollers	5	6^{10}
(Italy) F Fognini (Argentina) D Schwartzman	3	3
6	(Colombia) JS Cabal (Colombia) R Farah	6	6
3	(Finland) H Kontinen (Australia) J Peers	4	4
(Croatia) N Mektić (Austria) A Peya	6	6
(South Africa) R Klaasen (New Zealand) M Venus	4	7^{7}	[10]
8	(India) R Bopanna (France) É Roger-Vasselin	6	6^{4}	[5]

Quarterfinals
1	(Poland) Ł Kubot (Brazil) M Melo	4	6	[8]
6	(Colombia) JS Cabal (Colombia) R Farah	6	2	[10]
(Croatia) N Mektić (Austria) A Peya	6^{4}	6	[10]
(South Africa) R Klaasen (New Zealand) M Venus	7^{7}	3	[8]

Semifinals
6	(Colombia) JS Cabal (Colombia) R Farah	3	6	[3]
(Croatia) N Mektić (Austria) A Peya	6	3	[10]

=== Bottom half ===
First round
(Japan) B McLachlan (Germany) J-L Struff	6	7^{7}
(United States) J Isner (United States) J Sock	4	6^{4}
(Germany) A Zverev (Germany) M Zverev	7^{7}	6^{4}	[7]
WC	(Spain) D Marrero (Spain) F Verdasco	6^{3}	7^{7}	[10]
(Netherlands) R Haase (Netherlands) J-J Rojer	7	6
(Mexico) S González (Pakistan) A-u-H Qureshi	5	3
(Bosnia and Herzegovina) D Džumhur (Croatia) F Škugor	6	6
(Russia) K Khachanov (France) L Pouille	3	4

Second round
7	(Croatia) I Dodig (United States) R Ram	1	3
(Japan) B McLachlan (Germany) J-L Struff	6	6
WC	(Spain) D Marrero (Spain) F Verdasco	1	4
4	(France) P-H Herbert (France) N Mahut	6	6
5	(United Kingdom) J Murray (Brazil) B Soares	6	3	[10]
(Netherlands) R Haase (Netherlands) J-J Rojer	4	6	[6]
(Bosnia and Herzegovina) D Džumhur (Croatia) F Škugor	4	3
2	(United States) B Bryan (United States) M Bryan	6	6

Quarterfinals
(Japan) B McLachlan (Germany) J-L Struff	2	3
4	(France) P-H Herbert (France) N Mahut	6	6
5	(United Kingdom) J Murray (Brazil) B Soares	4	7^{7}	[7]
2	(United States) B Bryan (United States) M Bryan	6	6^{4}	[10]

Semifinals
4	(France) P-H Herbert (France) N Mahut	1	6^{2}
2	(United States) B Bryan (United States) M Bryan	6	7^{7}
