= 2015 Royal Lahaina Challenger – Singles =

Singles
- 2015 Royal Lahaina Challenger

Final
- Champion: (United States) Jared Donaldson
- Runner-up: (United States) Nicolas Meister
- Score: 6–1, 6–4

Events
Singles	Doubles
- Royal Lahaina Challenger

Bradley Klahn was the defending champion, but lost in the semifinals to Jared Donaldson.

Donaldson went on to win the title, defeating Nicolas Meister 6–1, 6–4 in the final.

== Seeds ==
1. (United States) Denis Kudla (second round)
2. (United States) Bradley Klahn (semifinals)
3. (United States) Michael Russell (second round)
4. (United States) Ryan Harrison (first round)
5. (United States) Wayne Odesnik (second round)
6. (Ukraine) Denys Molchanov (first round)
7. (United States) Chase Buchanan (second round)
8. (United States) Jarmere Jenkins (first round)

== Draw ==
Key

- Q = Qualifier
- WC = Wild card
- LL = Lucky loser
- Alt = Alternate
- ITF = ITF entry
- PR = Protected ranking
- SR = Special ranking
- SE = Special exempt
- JE = Junior exempt
- JR = Junior Accelerator Programme entrant
- CO = College Accelerator Programme entrant
- NG = Next Gen Accelerator Program entrant
- w/o = Walkover
- r = Retired
- d = Defaulted

=== Finals ===
Semifinals
Q	(United States) Nicolas Meister	7^{7}	6
(Republic of Ireland) James McGee	6^{5}	2
(United States) Jared Donaldson	7	7^{7}
2	(United States) Bradley Klahn	5	6^{4}

Final
Q	(United States) Nicolas Meister	1	4
(United States) Jared Donaldson	6	6

=== Top half ===
First round
1	(United States) D Kudla	7	6
(Australia) M Reid	5	3
Q	(Zimbabwe) T Garanganga	3	6	6
Q	(China) C Wang	6	3	2
Q	(United States) N Meister	6	6
PR	(United States) R Sweeting	3	0
(Japan) T Niki	6	6^{2}	6
6	(Ukraine) D Molchanov	3	7^{7}	2
3	(United States) M Russell	2	6	6
WC	(United States) M Krueger	6	1	3
Q	(United States) S Bangoura	4	2
WC	(United States) S Kozlov	6	6
WC	(Germany) Marko Lenz	3	3
(Republic of Ireland) J McGee	6	6
(Brazil) Henrique Cunha	2	3
5	(United States) W Odesnik	6	6

Second round
1	(United States) D Kudla	6	4	4
Q	(Zimbabwe) T Garanganga	3	6	6
Q	(United States) N Meister	7^{7}	6
(Japan) T Niki	6^{0}	1
3	(United States) M Russell	6^{2}	3
WC	(United States) S Kozlov	7^{7}	6
(Republic of Ireland) J McGee	6	6
5	(United States) W Odesnik	4	4

Quarterfinals
Q	(Zimbabwe) T Garanganga	3	7^{7}	2
Q	(United States) N Meister	6	6^{3}	6
WC	(United States) S Kozlov	6^{6}	2
(Republic of Ireland) J McGee	7^{8}	6

Semifinals
Q	(United States) N Meister	7^{7}	6
(Republic of Ireland) J McGee	6^{5}	2

=== Bottom half ===
First round
7	(United States) C Buchanan	4	7^{7}	6
(United States) D Nguyen	6	6^{4}	3
(United States) J Donaldson	7	7^{8}
(Japan) Y Uchiyama	5	6^{6}
(Bulgaria) D Kutrovsky	7	6^{6}	1
(Barbados) D King	5	7^{8}	6
(United States) D Novikov	6	3	6
4	(United States) R Harrison	4	6	3
8	(United States) J Jenkins	2	3
(Switzerland) S Ehrat	6	6
(United States) R Williams	6	6
WC	(France) Thibaud Berland	1	3
(Denmark) F Nielsen	2	6	6
(United States) J Jung	6	4	1
(United States) B Fratangelo	5	1^{r}
2	(United States) B Klahn	7	4

Second round
7	(United States) C Buchanan	1	3
(United States) J Donaldson	6	6
(Barbados) D King	4	3
(United States) D Novikov	6	6
(Switzerland) S Ehrat	1	6	6
(United States) R Williams	6	2	4
(Denmark) F Nielsen	3	4
2	(United States) B Klahn	6	6

Quarterfinals
(United States) J Donaldson	6	7^{7}
(United States) D Novikov	3	6^{5}
(Switzerland) S Ehrat	5	4
2	(United States) B Klahn	7	6

Semifinals
(United States) J Donaldson	7	7^{7}
2	(United States) B Klahn	5	6^{4}
