= 2015 Sacramento Challenger – Doubles =

Doubles
- 2015 Sacramento Challenger

Final
- Champions: (Slovenia) Blaž Kavčič (Slovenia) Grega Žemlja
- Runners-up: (Germany) Daniel Brands (Germany) Dustin Brown
- Score: 6–1, 3–6, [10–3]

Events
Singles	Doubles
- Sacramento Challenger

Adam Hubble and John-Patrick Smith are the defending champions, but chose not to defend their title.

== Seeds ==
1. (Sweden) Johan Brunström / (Denmark) Frederik Nielsen (semifinals)
2. (South Africa) Dean O'Brien / (South Africa) Ruan Roelofse (first round)
3. (United States) Dennis Novikov / (Chile) Julio Peralta (first round)
4. (Australia) Carsten Ball / (Australia) Matt Reid (quarterfinals)

== Draw ==
Key

- Q = Qualifier
- WC = Wild card
- LL = Lucky loser
- Alt = Alternate
- ITF = ITF entry
- PR = Protected ranking
- SR = Special ranking
- SE = Special exempt
- JE = Junior exempt
- JR = Junior Accelerator Programme entrant
- CO = College Accelerator Programme entrant
- NG = Next Gen Accelerator Program entrant
- w/o = Walkover
- r = Retired
- d = Defaulted

First round
1	(Sweden) J Brunström (Denmark) F Nielsen	6	4	[10]
Q	(United States) E King (Bulgaria) D Kutrovsky	2	6	[8]
(United Kingdom) B Klein (New Zealand) J Statham	3	6	[5]
(Uruguay) A Behar (Philippines) R Gonzales	6	3	[10]
4	(Australia) C Ball (Australia) M Reid	6	7
WC	(United States) Darrin Cohen (Belarus) Kiryl Harbatsiuk	3	5
(Germany) D Brands (Germany) D Brown	4	6	[10]
PR	(Canada) P Bester (Canada) P Polansky	6	4	[4]
(Slovenia) B Kavčič (Slovenia) G Žemlja	6	5	[12]
(France) Q Halys (United States) F Tiafoe	0	7	[10]
(United States) S Bangoura (Czech Republic) M Michalička	6	6
3	(United States) D Novikov (Chile) J Peralta	3	4
(United States) M Krueger (United States) Connor Smith	3	4
WC	(United States) M Giron (United States) T Paul	6	6
WC	(United States) T Fritz (United States) R Opelka	0	6	[10]
2	(South Africa) D O'Brien (South Africa) R Roelofse	6	3	[6]

Quarterfinals
1	(Sweden) J Brunström (Denmark) F Nielsen	6	6
(Uruguay) A Behar (Philippines) R Gonzales	2	4
4	(Australia) C Ball (Australia) M Reid	6^{3}	3
(Germany) D Brands (Germany) D Brown	7^{7}	6
(Slovenia) B Kavčič (Slovenia) G Žemlja	6	7^{7}
(United States) S Bangoura (Czech Republic) M Michalička	3	6^{0}
WC	(United States) M Giron (United States) T Paul	7^{8}	4	[7]
WC	(United States) T Fritz (United States) R Opelka	6^{6}	6	[10]

Semifinals
1	(Sweden) J Brunström (Denmark) F Nielsen	2	6^{9}
(Germany) D Brands (Germany) D Brown	6	7^{11}
(Slovenia) B Kavčič (Slovenia) G Žemlja	7	6
WC	(United States) T Fritz (United States) R Opelka	5	3

Final
(Germany) D Brands (Germany) D Brown	1	6	[3]
(Slovenia) B Kavčič (Slovenia) G Žemlja	6	3	[10]
