= 2015 Sacramento Challenger – Singles =

Singles
- 2015 Sacramento Challenger

Final
- Champion: (United States) Taylor Harry Fritz
- Runner-up: (United States) Jared Donaldson
- Score: 6–4, 3–6, 6–4

Events
Singles	Doubles
- Sacramento Challenger

Sam Querrey was the defending champion, but chose to compete in the Japan Open instead of defending his title.

Wildcard Taylor Harry Fritz won the title defeating Jared Donaldson in the final, 6–4, 3–6, 6–4.

== Seeds ==
1. (United States) Denis Kudla (semifinals)
2. (United Kingdom) Kyle Edmund (first round)
3. (Germany) Dustin Brown (second round)
4. (United States) Tim Smyczek (second round)
5. (Slovenia) Blaž Rola (second round)
6. (United States) Dennis Novikov (first round)
7. (United States) Jared Donaldson (final)
8. (Slovenia) Blaž Kavčič (second round)

== Draw ==
Key

- Q = Qualifier
- WC = Wild card
- LL = Lucky loser
- Alt = Alternate
- ITF = ITF entry
- PR = Protected ranking
- SR = Special ranking
- SE = Special exempt
- JE = Junior exempt
- JR = Junior Accelerator Programme entrant
- CO = College Accelerator Programme entrant
- NG = Next Gen Accelerator Program entrant
- w/o = Walkover
- r = Retired
- d = Defaulted

=== Finals ===
Semifinals
1	(United States) Denis Kudla	3	6	4
7	(United States) Jared Donaldson	6	2	6
WC	(United States) Taylor Harry Fritz	6	7^{7}
WC	(Australia) Matt Reid	3	6^{4}

Final
7	(United States) Jared Donaldson	4	6	4
WC	(United States) Taylor Harry Fritz	6	3	6

=== Top half ===
First round
1	(United States) D Kudla	7	6
(France) Q Halys	5	4
Q	(United States) T Paul	7^{7}	6
WC	(United States) A Kuznetsov	6^{5}	3
(United Kingdom) B Klein	4	6^{7}
(Germany) D Brands	6	7^{9}
(United States) S Bangoura	6	7^{7}
6	(United States) D Novikov	2	6^{3}
4	(United States) T Smyczek	4	7	7^{9}
Alt	(United States) F Tiafoe	6	5	6^{7}
SE	(United States) M McDonald	6	6
PR	(Canada) P Polansky	3	1
(United States) A Sarkissian	6	0	2
(United States) T Sandgren	2	6	6
(United States) M Krueger	4	4
7	(United States) J Donaldson	6	6

Second round
1	(United States) D Kudla	6	6
Q	(United States) T Paul	4	2
(Germany) D Brands	7^{7}	6
(United States) S Bangoura	6^{4}	2
4	(United States) T Smyczek	1	5
SE	(United States) M McDonald	6	7
(United States) T Sandgren	1	4
7	(United States) J Donaldson	6	6

Quarterfinals
1	(United States) D Kudla	6	6
(Germany) D Brands	4	3
SE	(United States) M McDonald	4	1
7	(United States) J Donaldson	6	6

Semifinals
1	(United States) D Kudla	3	6	4
7	(United States) J Donaldson	6	2	6

=== Bottom half ===
First round
8	(Slovenia) B Kavčič	6	6
(Canada) P Bester	4	4
Alt	(Czech Republic) M Michalička	4	3
Q	(United States) M Giron	6	6
WC	(United States) T Fritz	6	6
(United States) Connor Smith	4	0
(Slovenia) G Žemlja	6^{6}	6	3
3	(Germany) D Brown	7^{8}	4	6
5	(Slovenia) B Rola	6^{4}	6	6
(Chinese Taipei) J Jung	7^{7}	4	4
(Republic of Ireland) J McGee	6^{3}	3
WC	(Australia) M Reid	7^{7}	6
Q	(Denmark) F Nielsen	1	3
Q	(United States) N Meister	6	6
(Barbados) D King	1	6	6
2	(United Kingdom) K Edmund	6	1	4

Second round
8	(Slovenia) B Kavčič	6^{3}	6^{2}
Q	(United States) M Giron	7^{7}	7^{7}
WC	(United States) T Fritz	6^{3}	7^{7}	7^{9}
3	(Germany) D Brown	7^{7}	6^{5}	6^{7}
5	(Slovenia) B Rola	6	4	4
WC	(Australia) M Reid	2	6	6
Q	(United States) N Meister	7	5	6
(Barbados) D King	5	7	3

Quarterfinals
Q	(United States) M Giron	3	4
WC	(United States) T Fritz	6	6
WC	(Australia) M Reid	7	6^{4}	6
Q	(United States) N Meister	5	7^{7}	4

Semifinals
WC	(United States) T Fritz	6	7^{7}
WC	(Australia) M Reid	3	6^{4}
