= 2015 Royal Lahaina Challenger – Doubles =

Doubles
- 2015 Royal Lahaina Challenger

Final
- Champions: (United States) Jared Donaldson (United States) Stefan Kozlov
- Runners-up: (United States) Chase Buchanan (United States) Rhyne Williams
- Score: 6–3, 6–4

Events
Singles	Doubles
- Royal Lahaina Challenger

Denis Kudla and Yasutaka Uchiyama were the defending champions, but lost to Jared Donaldson and Stefan Kozlov in the quarterfinals.

Donaldson and Kozlov went on to win the title, defeating Chase Buchanan and Rhyne Williams in the final, 6–3, 6–4.

== Seeds ==
1. (Germany) Martin Emmrich / (Sweden) Andreas Siljeström (quarterfinals)
2. (United States) James Cerretani / (Republic of Ireland) James Cluskey (first round)
3. (South Africa) Dean O'Brien / (Colombia) Juan Carlos Spir (quarterfinals)
4. (Ukraine) Denys Molchanov / (Australia) Matt Reid (first round)

== Draw ==
Key

- Q = Qualifier
- WC = Wild card
- LL = Lucky loser
- Alt = Alternate
- ITF = ITF entry
- PR = Protected ranking
- SR = Special ranking
- SE = Special exempt
- JE = Junior exempt
- JR = Junior Accelerator Programme entrant
- CO = College Accelerator Programme entrant
- NG = Next Gen Accelerator Program entrant
- w/o = Walkover
- r = Retired
- d = Defaulted

=== Draw ===
First round
1	(Germany) M Emmrich (Sweden) A Siljeström	6	6
(United States) S Bangoura (United States) J Jung	2	2
WC	(United States) Ikaika Jobe (United States) D Lajola	6	6^{4}	[4]
(United States) N Meister (United States) D Nguyen	4	7^{7}	[10]
3	(South Africa) D O'Brien (Colombia) JC Spir	6	6
PR	(United States) M Russell (United States) R Sweeting	3	0
Q	(Chile) J Peralta (United States) M Seeberger	1	3
(United States) C Buchanan (United States) R Williams	6	6
(Brazil) Henrique Cunha (Zimbabwe) T Garanganga	6^{3}	7	[9]
WC	(United States) W Odesnik (United States) M Shabaz	7^{7}	5	[11]
(Bulgaria) D Kutrovsky (United States) D Novikov	4	6	[10]
4	(Ukraine) D Molchanov (Australia) M Reid	6	4	[3]
(Philippines) R Gonzales (United Kingdom) D Walsh	4	6^{3}
(United States) D Kudla (Japan) Y Uchiyama	6	7^{7}
WC	(United States) J Donaldson (United States) S Kozlov	6	6
2	(United States) J Cerretani (Republic of Ireland) J Cluskey	3	2

Quarterfinals
1	(Germany) M Emmrich (Sweden) A Siljeström	4	6^{1}
(United States) N Meister (United States) D Nguyen	6	7^{7}
3	(South Africa) D O'Brien (Colombia) JC Spir	3	2
(United States) C Buchanan (United States) R Williams	6	6
WC	(United States) W Odesnik (United States) M Shabaz	6	3	[4]
(Bulgaria) D Kutrovsky (United States) D Novikov	4	6	[10]
(United States) D Kudla (Japan) Y Uchiyama	6	0	[3]
WC	(United States) J Donaldson (United States) S Kozlov	3	6	[10]

Semifinals
(United States) N Meister (United States) D Nguyen	6	5	[7]
(United States) C Buchanan (United States) R Williams	3	7	[10]
(Bulgaria) D Kutrovsky (United States) D Novikov
WC	(United States) J Donaldson (United States) S Kozlov	w/o

Final
(United States) C Buchanan (United States) R Williams	3	4
WC	(United States) J Donaldson (United States) S Kozlov	6	6
