= 2015 Royal Lahaina Challenger =

- Date: 25 January – 1 February
- Edition: 6th
- Draw: 32S / 16D
- Prize money: $50,000
- Surface: Hard
- Location: Maui, United States

Champions

Singles
- (United States) Jared Donaldson

Doubles
- (United States) Jared Donaldson / (United States) Stefan Kozlov
- Royal Lahaina Challenger

The 2015 Royal Lahaina Challenger was a professional tennis tournament played on hard courts. It was the sixth edition of the tournament which was part of the 2015 ATP Challenger Tour. It took place in Maui, United States between 25 January and 1 February 2015.

== Singles main-draw entrants ==
=== Seeds ===
Country	Player	Rank^{1}	Seed
USA	Denis Kudla	123	1
USA	Bradley Klahn	150	2
USA	Michael Russell	156	3
USA	Ryan Harrison	160	4
USA	Wayne Odesnik	167	5
UKR	Denys Molchanov	171	6
USA	Chase Buchanan	179	7
USA	Jarmere Jenkins	191	8

- ^{1} Rankings are as of January 19, 2015.

=== Other entrants ===
The following players received wildcards into the singles main draw:

- (France) Thibaud Berland
- (United States) Stefan Kozlov
- (United States) Mitchell Krueger
- (Germany) Marko Lenz

The following players received entry from the qualifying draw:

- (China) Wang Chuhan
- (Zimbabwe) Takanyi Garanganga
- (United States) Nicolas Meister
- (United States) Sekou Bangoura

The following players received entry through the use of a protected ranking:

- (United States) Ryan Sweeting

== Champions ==
=== Singles ===
- (United States) Jared Donaldson def. (United States) Nicolas Meister, 6–1, 6–4

=== Doubles ===
- (United States) Jared Donaldson / (United States) Stefan Kozlov def. (United States) Chase Buchanan / (United States) Rhyne Williams, 6–3, 6–4
