= 2018 Mutua Madrid Open – Men's singles =

Men's singles
- 2018 Mutua Madrid Open

Final
- Champion: (Germany) Alexander Zverev
- Runner-up: (Austria) Dominic Thiem
- Score: 6–4, 6–4

Details
- Draw: 56 (7 Q / 4 WC )
- Seeds: 16

Events
Singles	men	women
Doubles	men	women
← 2017 ·	Mutua Madrid Open	· 2019 →

Alexander Zverev defeated Dominic Thiem in the final, 6–4, 6–4 to win the men's singles tennis title at the 2018 Madrid Open. He did not lose a set en route to the title, and did not have his serve broken throughout the entire tournament.

Rafael Nadal was the defending champion, but lost to Thiem in the quarterfinals in a rematch of the previous year's final. His defeat ended a 50-set winning streak on clay, the longest single-surface set-winning streak in the Open Era.

Despite his withdrawal from the clay court season, Roger Federer regained the ATP No. 1 singles ranking as Nadal failed to defend his title.

== Seeds ==
The top eight seeds receive a bye into the second round.

1. (Spain) Rafael Nadal (quarterfinals)
2. (Germany) Alexander Zverev (champion)
3. (Bulgaria) Grigor Dimitrov (second round)
4. (Argentina) Juan Martín del Potro (third round)
5. (Austria) Dominic Thiem (final)
6. (South Africa) Kevin Anderson (semifinals)
7. (United States) John Isner (quarterfinals)
8. (Belgium) David Goffin (third round)

9. (Spain) Pablo Carreño Busta (first round)
10. (Serbia) Novak Djokovic (second round)
11. (Spain) Roberto Bautista Agut (second round)
12. (United States) Jack Sock (first round)
13. (Argentina) Diego Schwartzman (third round)
14. (Czech Republic) Tomáš Berdych (first round)
15. (France) Lucas Pouille (first round)
16. (Italy) Fabio Fognini (first round)

Click on the seed number of a player to go to their draw section.

== Draw ==
=== Key ===
- Q = Qualifier
- WC = Wild card
- LL = Lucky loser
- Alt = Alternate
- SE = Special exempt
- PR = Protected ranking
- ITF = ITF entry
- JE = Junior exempt
- w/o = Walkover
- r = Retired
- d = Defaulted
- SR = Special ranking

=== Finals ===
Quarterfinals
1	(Spain) Rafael Nadal	5	3
5	(Austria) Dominic Thiem	7	6
Q	(Serbia) Dušan Lajović	6^{3}	6	3
6	(South Africa) Kevin Anderson	7^{7}	3	6
(United Kingdom) Kyle Edmund	5	7^{8}	4
(Canada) Denis Shapovalov	7	6^{6}	6
7	(United States) John Isner	4	5
2	(Germany) Alexander Zverev	6	7

Semifinals
5	(Austria) Dominic Thiem	6	6
6	(South Africa) Kevin Anderson	4	2
(Canada) Denis Shapovalov	4	1
2	(Germany) Alexander Zverev	6	6

Final
5	(Austria) Dominic Thiem	4	4
2	(Germany) Alexander Zverev	6	6

=== Top half ===
==== Section 1 ====
First round
(France) G Monfils	6	3	6
Q	(Georgia (country)) N Basilashvili	2	6	3
WC	(Spain) P Andújar	6^{4}	3
(Spain) F López	7^{7}	6
(France) A Mannarino	1	3
13	(Argentina) D Schwartzman	6	6
9	(Spain) P Carreño Busta	4	2
(Croatia) B Ćorić	6	6
Q	(Romania) M Copil	4	4
(Germany) J-L Struff	6	6
Q	(Argentina) F Delbonis	6	2	7^{8}
(Germany) M Zverev	1	6	6^{6}

Second round
1	(Spain) R Nadal	6	6
(France) G Monfils	3	1
(Spain) F López	5	6	2
13	(Argentina) D Schwartzman	7	2	6
(Croatia) B Ćorić	6	6
(Germany) J-L Struff	0	2
Q	(Argentina) F Delbonis	6	3	5
5	(Austria) D Thiem	4	6	7

Third round
1	(Spain) R Nadal	6	6
13	(Argentina) D Schwartzman	3	4
(Croatia) B Ćorić	6	6^{5}	4
5	(Austria) D Thiem	2	7^{7}	6

Quarterfinals
1	(Spain) R Nadal	5	3
5	(Austria) D Thiem	7	6

==== Section 2 ====
First round
(France) J Benneteau	4	2
(Bosnia and Herzegovina) D Džumhur	6	6
(Russia) K Khachanov	3	2
Q	(Serbia) D Lajović	6	6
(France) R Gasquet	6	6
14	(Czech Republic) T Berdych	4	2
11	(Spain) R Bautista Agut	6^{3}	6	6
(United States) J Donaldson	7^{7}	4	4
(Germany) P Kohlschreiber	6	6
(Japan) Y Sugita	4	3
Q	(Kazakhstan) M Kukushkin	6	6
WC	(Spain) R Carballés Baena	3	2

Second round
4	(Argentina) JM del Potro	6	6
(Bosnia and Herzegovina) D Džumhur	3	3
Q	(Serbia) D Lajović	7^{7}	7^{7}
(France) R Gasquet	6^{1}	6^{1}
11	(Spain) R Bautista Agut	3	6	5
(Germany) P Kohlschreiber	6	4	7
Q	(Kazakhstan) M Kukushkin	7	6^{3}	2
6	(South Africa) K Anderson	5	7^{7}	6

Third round
4	(Argentina) JM del Potro	6	4	6^{6}
Q	(Serbia) D Lajović	3	6	7^{8}
(Germany) P Kohlschreiber	3	6^{7}
6	(South Africa) K Anderson	6	7^{9}

Quarterfinals
Q	(Serbia) D Lajović	6^{3}	6	3
6	(South Africa) K Anderson	7^{7}	3	6

=== Bottom half ===
==== Section 3 ====
First round
(Netherlands) R Haase	6	6
(South Korea) H Chung	2	0
(Russia) D Medvedev	4	0
(United Kingdom) K Edmund	6	6
(Japan) K Nishikori	5	4
10	(Serbia) N Djokovic	7	6
15	(France) L Pouille	2	3
(France) B Paire	6	6
(Canada) D Shapovalov	6	6
(United States) T Sandgren	1	4
Q	(Argentina) N Kicker	3	2
(Canada) M Raonic	6	6

Second round
8	(Belgium) D Goffin	7	6
(Netherlands) R Haase	5	3
(United Kingdom) K Edmund	6	2	6
10	(Serbia) N Djokovic	3	6	3
(France) B Paire	6^{5}	6	4
(Canada) D Shapovalov	7^{7}	4	6
(Canada) M Raonic	7	3	6
3	(Bulgaria) G Dimitrov	5	6	3

Third round
8	(Belgium) D Goffin	3	3
(United Kingdom) K Edmund	6	6
(Canada) D Shapovalov	6	6
(Canada) M Raonic	4	4

Quarterfinals
(United Kingdom) K Edmund	5	7^{8}	4
(Canada) D Shapovalov	7	6^{6}	6

==== Section 4 ====
First round
WC	(Spain) G García López	4	6^{7}
(United States) R Harrison	6	7^{9}
(Germany) P Gojowczyk	7	2	5
(Spain) A Ramos Viñolas	5	6	7
(Uruguay) P Cuevas	6^{5}	6	6
12	(United States) J Sock	7^{7}	4	0
16	(Italy) F Fognini	3	4
(Argentina) L Mayer	6	6
(Spain) F Verdasco	7	6
(Italy) P Lorenzi	5	4
Q	(Russia) E Donskoy	5	6	7^{7}
WC	(Greece) S Tsitsipas	7	4	6^{3}

Second round
7	(United States) J Isner	7^{7}	7^{9}
(United States) R Harrison	6^{1}	6^{7}
(Spain) A Ramos Viñolas	1	7^{7}	2
(Uruguay) P Cuevas	6	6^{2}	6
(Argentina) L Mayer	6	6
(Spain) F Verdasco	2	1
Q	(Russia) E Donskoy	2	5
2	(Germany) A Zverev	6	7

Third round
7	(United States) J Isner	6^{9}	7^{7}	7^{7}
(Uruguay) P Cuevas	7^{11}	6^{3}	6^{4}
(Argentina) L Mayer	4	2
2	(Germany) A Zverev	6	6

Quarterfinals
7	(United States) J Isner	4	5
2	(Germany) A Zverev	6	7

== Qualifying ==
=== Seeds ===
1. (United States) Taylor Fritz (qualifying competition)
2. (Serbia) Viktor Troicki (qualifying competition)
3. (Germany) Florian Mayer (qualifying competition)
4. (France) Pierre-Hugues Herbert (qualifying competition)
5. (Georgia (country)) Nikoloz Basilashvili (qualified)
6. (Argentina) Federico Delbonis (qualified)
7. (Romania) Marius Copil (qualified)
8. (Russia) Evgeny Donskoy (qualified)
9. (Uzbekistan) Denis Istomin (first round)
10. (Bosnia and Herzegovina) Mirza Bašić (qualifying competition)
11. (Serbia) Dušan Lajović (qualified)
12. (Argentina) Nicolás Kicker (qualified)
13. (Kazakhstan) Mikhail Kukushkin (qualified)
14. (Russia) Mikhail Youzhny (qualifying competition)

=== Qualifiers ===
1. (Argentina) Nicolás Kicker
2. (Kazakhstan) Mikhail Kukushkin
3. (Serbia) Dušan Lajović
4. (Russia) Evgeny Donskoy
5. (Georgia (country)) Nikoloz Basilashvili
6. (Argentina) Federico Delbonis
7. (Romania) Marius Copil

=== Qualifying draw ===
==== First qualifier ====
First round
1	(United States) Taylor Fritz	3	6	6
WC	(Spain) Alejandro Davidovich Fokina	6	4	4
(Estonia) Jürgen Zopp	4	6^{4}
12	(Argentina) Nicolás Kicker	6	7^{7}

Qualifying competition
1	(United States) Taylor Fritz	2	6	3
12	(Argentina) Nicolás Kicker	6	3	6

==== Second qualifier ====
First round
2	(Serbia) Viktor Troicki	4	6	7
Alt	(Argentina) Pedro Cachin	6	3	5
(France) Nicolas Mahut	3	4
13	(Kazakhstan) Mikhail Kukushkin	6	6

Qualifying competition
2	(Serbia) Viktor Troicki	6^{5}	1
13	(Kazakhstan) Mikhail Kukushkin	7^{7}	6

==== Third qualifier ====
First round
3	(Germany) Florian Mayer	7^{7}	7^{10}
(Spain) Marcel Granollers	6^{1}	6^{8}
WC	(Spain) Daniel Gimeno Traver	2	4
11	(Serbia) Dušan Lajović	6	6

Qualifying competition
3	(Germany) Florian Mayer	3	3
11	(Serbia) Dušan Lajović	6	6

==== Fourth qualifier ====
First round
4	(France) Pierre-Hugues Herbert	6	6
(India) Ramkumar Ramanathan	4	3
(Italy) Stefano Travaglia	6^{4}	2
8	(Russia) Evgeny Donskoy	7^{7}	6

Qualifying competition
4	(France) Pierre-Hugues Herbert	6	3	6^{6}
8	(Russia) Evgeny Donskoy	3	6	7^{8}

==== Fifth qualifier ====
First round
5	(Georgia (country)) Nikoloz Basilashvili	4	3
(United States) Bjorn Fratangelo	6	2^{r}
WC	(Spain) Nicolás Álvarez Varona	6	6^{2}	2
10	(Bosnia and Herzegovina) Mirza Bašić	3	7^{7}	6

Qualifying competition
5	(Georgia (country)) Nikoloz Basilashvili	6	6^{8}	6
10	(Bosnia and Herzegovina) Mirza Bašić	4	7^{10}	3

==== Sixth qualifier ====
First round
6	(Argentina) Federico Delbonis	6	6
Alt	(Spain) Miguel Semmler	4	1
(Italy) Matteo Berrettini	6	3	2
14	(Russia) Mikhail Youzhny	3	6	6

Qualifying competition
6	(Argentina) Federico Delbonis	6	6
14	(Russia) Mikhail Youzhny	3	1

==== Seventh qualifier ====
First round
7	(Romania) Marius Copil	6	3	6
(Belarus) Ilya Ivashka	4	6	3
WC	(Spain) Jaume Munar	7^{7}	6
9	(Uzbekistan) Denis Istomin	6^{5}	0

Qualifying competition
7	(Romania) Marius Copil	7^{7}	6^{2}	6
WC	(Spain) Jaume Munar	6^{5}	7^{7}	4
