= 2017 Mutua Madrid Open – Women's singles =

Women's singles
- 2017 Mutua Madrid Open

Final
- Champion: (Romania) Simona Halep
- Runner-up: (France) Kristina Mladenovic
- Score: 7–5, 6–7^{(5–7)}, 6–2

Events
Singles	men	women
Doubles	men	women
← 2016 ·	Mutua Madrid Open	· 2018 →

Defending champion Simona Halep defeated Kristina Mladenovic in the final, 7–5, 6–7^{(5–7)}, 6–2 to win the women's singles tennis title at the 2017 Madrid Open.

As a result of Serena Williams' withdrawal due to pregnancy, Angelique Kerber regained the WTA no. 1 ranking at the end of the tournament.

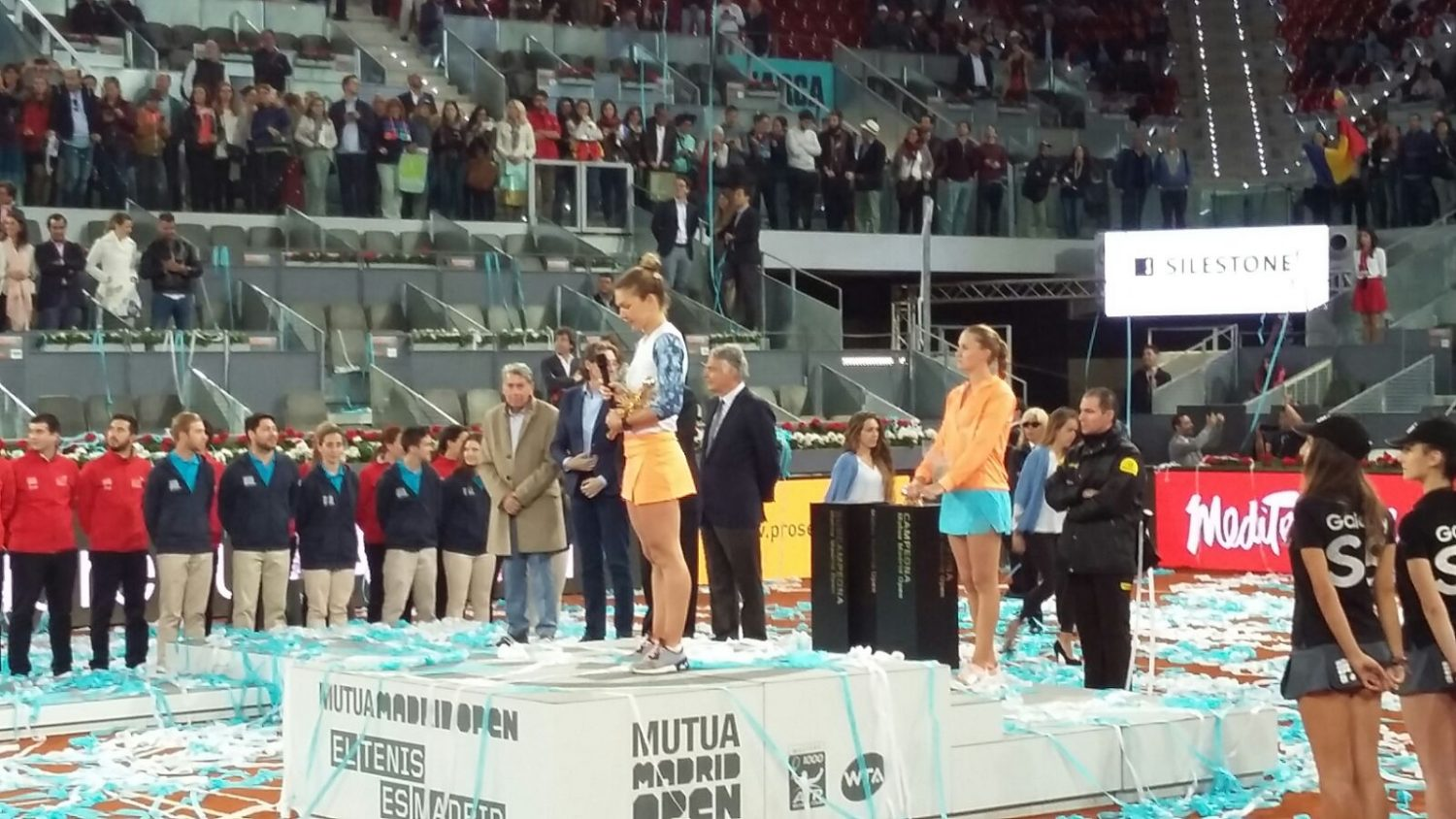
Tournament Prize Giving ceremony.

== Seeds ==
1. (Germany) Angelique Kerber (third round, retired)
2. (Czech Republic) Karolína Plíšková (second round)
3. (Romania) Simona Halep (champion)
4. (Slovakia) Dominika Cibulková (second round)
5. (Spain) Garbiñe Muguruza (first round)
6. (United Kingdom) Johanna Konta (first round)
7. (Poland) Agnieszka Radwańska (withdrew due to a foot injury)
8. (Russia) Svetlana Kuznetsova (semifinals)
9. (United States) Madison Keys (first round)

10. (Denmark) Caroline Wozniacki (second round)
11. (Ukraine) Elina Svitolina (first round)
12. (Russia) Elena Vesnina (first round)
13. (Russia) Anastasia Pavlyuchenkova (first round)
14. (France) Kristina Mladenovic (final)
15. (Czech Republic) Barbora Strýcová (second round)
16. (Australia) Samantha Stosur (third round)
17. (Croatia) Mirjana Lučić-Baroni (first round)

Click on the seed number of a player to go to their draw section.

== Draw ==
=== Key ===
- Q = Qualifier
- WC = Wild card
- LL = Lucky loser
- Alt = Alternate
- SE = Special exempt
- PR = Protected ranking
- ITF = ITF entry
- JE = Junior exempt
- w/o = Walkover
- r = Retired
- d = Defaulted
- SR = Special ranking

=== Finals ===
Quarterfinals
(Canada) Eugenie Bouchard	4	0
8	(Russia) Svetlana Kuznetsova	6	6
14	(France) Kristina Mladenovic	6	6
WC	(Romania) Sorana Cîrstea	4	4
(United States) Coco Vandeweghe	1	1
3	(Romania) Simona Halep	6	6
(Netherlands) Kiki Bertens	3	3
(Latvia) Anastasija Sevastova	6	6

Semifinals
8	(Russia) Svetlana Kuznetsova	4	6^{4}
14	(France) Kristina Mladenovic	6	7^{7}
3	(Romania) Simona Halep	6	6
(Latvia) Anastasija Sevastova	2	3

Final
14	(France) Kristina Mladenovic	5	7^{7}	2
3	(Romania) Simona Halep	7	6^{5}	6

=== Top half ===
==== Section 1 ====
First round
1	(Germany) A Kerber	6	6
(Hungary) T Babos	4	2
(Czech Republic) K Siniaková	6	6
Q	(France) P Parmentier	1	0
(France) A Cornet	4	6	1
(Canada) E Bouchard	6	4	6
WC	(Russia) M Sharapova	4	6	6
17	(Croatia) M Lučić-Baroni	6	4	0
11	(Ukraine) E Svitolina	6	6^{4}	3
Q	(China) S Zheng	2	7^{7}	6
(France) C Garcia	4	3
Q	(China) Q Wang	6	6
(United States) A Riske	6	6
(Switzerland) V Golubic	2	4
(Kazakhstan) Y Shvedova	4	3
8	(Russia) S Kuznetsova	6	6

Second round
1	(Germany) A Kerber	6	1	7
(Czech Republic) K Siniaková	2	6	5
(Canada) E Bouchard	7	2	6
WC	(Russia) M Sharapova	5	6	4
Q	(China) S Zheng	2	6	2
Q	(China) Q Wang	6	3	6
(United States) A Riske	6	6^{9}	2
8	(Russia) S Kuznetsova	2	7^{11}	6

Third round
1	(Germany) A Kerber	3	0^{r}
(Canada) E Bouchard	6	5
Q	(China) Q Wang	4	5
8	(Russia) S Kuznetsova	6	7

Quarterfinals
(Canada) E Bouchard	4	0
8	(Russia) S Kuznetsova	6	6

==== Section 2 ====
First round
4	(Slovakia) D Cibulková	6	5	7
(Serbia) J Janković	4	7	5
Q	(France) O Dodin	6	6
Q	(Germany) A Petkovic	3	4
(United States) L Davis	6	4	7^{7}
(Puerto Rico) M Puig	3	6	6^{3}
(Croatia) A Konjuh	7	3	0^{r}
14	(France) K Mladenovic	5	6	0
13	(Russia) A Pavlyuchenkova	1	6	6^{5}
WC	(Romania) S Cîrstea	6	3	7^{7}
(United States) C Bellis	7	5	6
(Australia) D Gavrilova	5	7	2
Q	(Croatia) D Vekić	6	6
(Kazakhstan) Y Putintseva	3	4
(Japan) M Doi	6	4	6
9	(United States) M Keys	4	6	4

Second round
4	(Slovakia) D Cibulková	2	4
Q	(France) O Dodin	6	6
(United States) L Davis	3	6	6^{1}
14	(France) K Mladenovic	6	1	7^{7}
WC	(Romania) S Cîrstea	6	6
(United States) C Bellis	3	2
Q	(Croatia) D Vekić	1	2
(Japan) M Doi	6	6

Third round
Q	(France) O Dodin	2	1
14	(France) K Mladenovic	6	6
WC	(Romania) S Cîrstea	7	3	6
(Japan) M Doi	5	6	1

Quarterfinals
14	(France) K Mladenovic	6	6
WC	(Romania) S Cîrstea	4	4

=== Bottom half ===
==== Section 3 ====
First round
6	(United Kingdom) J Konta	6	5	4
(Germany) L Siegemund	3	7	6
LL	(Estonia) A Kontaveit	4	6^{7}
(United States) C Vandeweghe	6	7^{9}
(Spain) C Suárez Navarro	3	7	6
(China) S Peng	6	5	0
(Romania) M Niculescu	5	7^{7}	4
10	(Denmark) C Wozniacki	7	6^{3}	6
16	(Australia) S Stosur	6	6
WC	(Spain) S Sorribes Tormo	2	0
(Germany) J Görges	3	4
Q	(Colombia) M Duque Mariño	6	6
(Italy) R Vinci	6	1	6
(Russia) D Kasatkina	1	6	1
(Czech Republic) Kr Plíšková	1	2
3	(Romania) S Halep	6	6

Second round
(Germany) L Siegemund	2	6	3
(United States) C Vandeweghe	6	4	6
(Spain) C Suárez Navarro	6	2	6
10	(Denmark) C Wozniacki	4	6	2
16	(Australia) S Stosur	6	7
Q	(Colombia) M Duque Mariño	3	5
(Italy) R Vinci	3	6	6^{2}
3	(Romania) S Halep	6	2	7^{7}

Third round
(United States) C Vandeweghe	5	6	7
(Spain) C Suárez Navarro	7	4	5
16	(Australia) S Stosur	4	6	4
3	(Romania) S Halep	6	4	6

Quarterfinals
(United States) C Vandeweghe	1	1
3	(Romania) S Halep	6	6

==== Section 4 ====
First round
5	(Spain) G Muguruza	1	3
(Switzerland) T Bacsinszky	6	6
(Netherlands) K Bertens	6	7^{7}
(Russia) E Makarova	1	6^{4}
Q	(Sweden) J Larsson	5	6	6
WC	(Italy) F Schiavone	7	3	1
(Romania) I-C Begu	6	6
12	(Russia) E Vesnina	4	4
15	(Czech Republic) B Strýcová	5	6	6
(Czech Republic) L Šafářová	7	3	3
(United States) C McHale	6	6^{1}	2
WC	(Spain) L Arruabarrena	4	7^{7}	6
(China) S Zhang	2	4
(Latvia) A Sevastova	6	6
(Ukraine) L Tsurenko	6^{5}	6	2
2	(Czech Republic) Ka Plíšková	7^{7}	2	6

Second round
(Switzerland) T Bacsinszky	2	2
(Netherlands) K Bertens	6	6
Q	(Sweden) J Larsson	6	6^{5}	3
(Romania) I-C Begu	4	7^{7}	6
15	(Czech Republic) B Strýcová	6	3	3
WC	(Spain) L Arruabarrena	3	6	6
(Latvia) A Sevastova	6	6
2	(Czech Republic) Ka Plíšková	3	3

Third round
(Netherlands) K Bertens	6	7
(Romania) I-C Begu	1	5
WC	(Spain) L Arruabarrena	5	2
(Latvia) A Sevastova	7	6

Quarterfinals
(Netherlands) K Bertens	3	3
(Latvia) A Sevastova	6	6

== Qualifying ==
=== Seeds ===
1. (United States) Shelby Rogers (qualifying competition, retired)
2. (Latvia) Jeļena Ostapenko (withdrew, still competing in Prague)
3. (Sweden) Johanna Larsson (qualified)
4. (China) Wang Qiang (qualified)
5. (France) Océane Dodin (qualified)
6. (Estonia) Anett Kontaveit (qualifying competition, lucky loser)
7. (China) Zheng Saisai (qualified)
8. (France) Pauline Parmentier (qualified)
9. (Japan) Risa Ozaki (qualifying competition)
10. (Bulgaria) Tsvetana Pironkova (first round)
11. (United States) Jennifer Brady (qualifying competition)
12. (Russia) Natalia Vikhlyantseva (first round, retired)
13. (Russia) Evgeniya Rodina (qualifying competition)
14. (Germany) Andrea Petkovic (qualified)
15. (Poland) Magda Linette (first round)
16. (Japan) Nao Hibino (first round)

=== Qualifiers ===
1. (Croatia) Donna Vekić
2. (Germany) Andrea Petkovic
3. (Sweden) Johanna Larsson
4. (China) Wang Qiang
5. (France) Océane Dodin
6. (Colombia) Mariana Duque Mariño
7. (China) Zheng Saisai
8. (France) Pauline Parmentier

=== Lucky loser ===
1. (Estonia) Anett Kontaveit

=== Draw ===
==== First qualifier ====
First round
1	(United States) Shelby Rogers	6	6
Alt	(United States) Bethanie Mattek-Sands	3	2
(Croatia) Donna Vekić	6	3
12	(Russia) Natalia Vikhlyantseva	2	0^{r}

Qualifying competition
1	(United States) Shelby Rogers	6^{4}	0^{r}
(Croatia) Donna Vekić	7^{7}	1

==== Second qualifier ====
First round
Alt	(Russia) Alla Kudryavtseva	1	6	4
(Greece) Maria Sakkari	6	2	6
(China) Han Xinyun	4	1
14	(Germany) Andrea Petkovic	6	6

Qualifying competition
(Greece) Maria Sakkari	2	6^{2}
14	(Germany) Andrea Petkovic	6	7^{7}

==== Third qualifier ====
First round
3	(Sweden) Johanna Larsson	6	6
(Belarus) Aliaksandra Sasnovich	4	4
(Romania) Ana Bogdan	6^{5}	6^{0}
11	(United States) Jennifer Brady	7^{7}	7^{7}

Qualifying competition
3	(Sweden) Johanna Larsson	6	6
11	(United States) Jennifer Brady	2	0

==== Fourth qualifier ====
First round
4	(China) Wang Qiang	6	6
WC	(Russia) Varvara Flink	0	4
(Belgium) Kirsten Flipkens	5	5
13	(Russia) Evgeniya Rodina	7	7

Qualifying competition
4	(China) Wang Qiang	6	6
13	(Russia) Evgeniya Rodina	2	2

==== Fifth qualifier ====
First round
5	(France) Océane Dodin	7^{7}	7
(Ukraine) Kateryna Bondarenko	6^{1}	5
WC	(Spain) Sílvia Soler Espinosa	6	2	6
15	(Poland) Magda Linette	4	6	1

Qualifying competition
5	(France) Océane Dodin	2	6	6
WC	(Spain) Sílvia Soler Espinosa	6	3	2

==== Sixth qualifier ====
First round
6	(Estonia) Anett Kontaveit	6	6
(United States) Julia Boserup	3	2
(Colombia) Mariana Duque Mariño	6	2	6
16	(Japan) Nao Hibino	4	6	3

Qualifying competition
6	(Estonia) Anett Kontaveit	3	3
(Colombia) Mariana Duque Mariño	6	6

==== Seventh qualifier ====
First round
7	(China) Zheng Saisai	6	6
Alt	(United States) Asia Muhammad	3	4
WC	(Spain) Paula Badosa Gibert	3	6	2
9	(Japan) Risa Ozaki	6	2	6

Qualifying competition
7	(China) Zheng Saisai	6	6
9	(Japan) Risa Ozaki	4	4

==== Eighth qualifier ====
First round
8	(France) Pauline Parmentier	2	6	6
(Italy) Sara Errani	6	2	2
(Russia) Ekaterina Alexandrova	6	7
10	(Bulgaria) Tsvetana Pironkova	2	5

Qualifying competition
8	(France) Pauline Parmentier	6	6
(Russia) Ekaterina Alexandrova	2	1
