= 2017 Mutua Madrid Open – Men's singles =

Men's singles
- 2017 Mutua Madrid Open

Final
- Champion: (Spain) Rafael Nadal
- Runner-up: (Austria) Dominic Thiem
- Score: 7–6^{(10–8)}, 6–4

Details
- Draw: 56 (7 Q / 4 WC )
- Seeds: 16

Events
Singles	men	women
Doubles	men	women
← 2016 ·	Mutua Madrid Open	· 2018 →

Rafael Nadal defeated Dominic Thiem in the final, 7–6^{(10–8)}, 6–4 to win the men's singles tennis title at the 2017 Madrid Open. It was his record fifth Madrid Open title and record-equaling 30th Masters singles title.

Novak Djokovic was the defending champion, but lost in the semifinals to Nadal.

== Seeds ==
The top eight seeds receive a bye into the second round.

1. (United Kingdom) Andy Murray (third round)
2. (Serbia) Novak Djokovic (semifinals)
3. (Switzerland) Stan Wawrinka (second round)
4. (Spain) Rafael Nadal (champion)
5. (Canada) Milos Raonic (third round)
6. (Japan) Kei Nishikori (quarterfinals, withdrew)
7. (Croatia) Marin Čilić (second round)
8. (Austria) Dominic Thiem (final)

9. (Belgium) David Goffin (quarterfinals)
10. (France) Jo-Wilfried Tsonga (second round, withdrew)
11. (Czech Republic) Tomáš Berdych (third round)
12. (Bulgaria) Grigor Dimitrov (third round)
13. (France) Lucas Pouille (first round)
14. (United States) Jack Sock (first round)
15. (France) Gaël Monfils (first round)
16. (Australia) Nick Kyrgios (third round)

Click on the seed number of a player to go to their draw section.

== Draw ==
=== Key ===
- Q = Qualifier
- WC = Wild card
- LL = Lucky loser
- Alt = Alternate
- SE = Special exempt
- PR = Protected ranking
- ITF = ITF entry
- JE = Junior exempt
- w/o = Walkover
- r = Retired
- d = Defaulted
- SR = Special ranking

=== Finals ===
Quarterfinals
LL	(Croatia) Borna Ćorić	1	4
8	(Austria) Dominic Thiem	6	6
(Uruguay) Pablo Cuevas	3	6	6
(Germany) Alexander Zverev	6	0	4
9	(Belgium) David Goffin	6^{3}	2
4	(Spain) Rafael Nadal	7^{7}	6
6	(Japan) Kei Nishikori
2	(Serbia) Novak Djokovic	w/o

Semifinals
8	(Austria) Dominic Thiem	6	6
(Uruguay) Pablo Cuevas	4	4
4	(Spain) Rafael Nadal	6	6
2	(Serbia) Novak Djokovic	2	4

Final
8	(Austria) Dominic Thiem	6^{8}	4
4	(Spain) Rafael Nadal	7^{10}	6

=== Top half ===
==== Section 1 ====
First round
WC	(Spain) G García López	6^{6}	6	6^{9}
WC	(Romania) M Copil	7^{8}	4	7^{11}
(Germany) M Zverev	3	6^{5}
LL	(Croatia) B Ćorić	6	7^{7}
Q	(France) P-H Herbert	7^{7}	6^{4}	6
13	(France) L Pouille	6^{5}	7^{7}	3
12	(Bulgaria) G Dimitrov	7^{9}	6
(Germany) P Kohlschreiber	6^{7}	4
(Croatia) I Karlović	7^{7}	6^{9}	7^{9}
(Spain) R Bautista Agut	6^{4}	7^{11}	6^{7}
LL	(United States) J Donaldson	7	6
Q	(France) A Mannarino	5	3

Second round
1	(United Kingdom) A Murray	6	6
WC	(Romania) M Copil	4	3
LL	(Croatia) B Ćorić	7	6
Q	(France) P-H Herbert	5	4
12	(Bulgaria) G Dimitrov	6	7
(Croatia) I Karlović	3	5
LL	(United States) J Donaldson	3	4
8	(Austria) D Thiem	6	6

Third round
1	(United Kingdom) A Murray	3	3
LL	(Croatia) B Ćorić	6	6
12	(Bulgaria) G Dimitrov	6	4	6^{9}
8	(Austria) D Thiem	4	6	7^{11}

Quarterfinals
LL	(Croatia) B Ćorić	1	4
8	(Austria) D Thiem	6	6

==== Section 2 ====
First round
(France) B Paire	6	6
(Spain) P Carreño Busta	3	4
Q	(Brazil) T Bellucci	6^{2}	6	6^{6}
(Uruguay) P Cuevas	7^{7}	4	7^{8}
(France) N Mahut	6	0	7^{7}
14	(United States) J Sock	4	6	6^{4}
11	(Czech Republic) T Berdych	6	6
Q	(Uzbekistan) D Istomin	4	4
(Netherlands) R Haase	7	6
(United Kingdom) D Evans	5	2
(Germany) A Zverev	7	6
(Spain) F Verdasco	5	3

Second round
3	(Switzerland) S Wawrinka	5	6	2
(France) B Paire	7	4	6
(Uruguay) P Cuevas	5	6	6
(France) N Mahut	7	4	4
11	(Czech Republic) T Berdych	7^{7}	6
(Netherlands) R Haase	6^{5}	3
(Germany) A Zverev	6^{3}	6	6
7	(Croatia) M Čilić	7^{7}	3	4

Third round
(France) B Paire	5	6	1
(Uruguay) P Cuevas	7	0	6
11	(Czech Republic) T Berdych	4	4
(Germany) A Zverev	6	6

Quarterfinals
(Uruguay) P Cuevas	3	6	6
(Germany) A Zverev	6	0	4

=== Bottom half ===
==== Section 3 ====
First round
PR	(Germany) T Haas	4	6^{7}
(Luxembourg) G Müller	6	7^{9}
(Spain) M Granollers	5	5
(Germany) F Mayer	7	7
(Russia) K Khachanov	2	6^{8}
9	(Belgium) D Goffin	6	7^{10}
16	(Australia) N Kyrgios	7^{7}	6
(Cyprus) M Baghdatis	6^{1}	4
(United States) R Harrison	7	4	6
(Australia) B Tomic	5	6	2
(Portugal) J Sousa	4	4
(Italy) F Fognini	6	6

Second round
5	(Canada) M Raonic	6	6
(Luxembourg) G Müller	4	4
(Germany) F Mayer	6^{3}	0
9	(Belgium) D Goffin	7^{7}	6
16	(Australia) N Kyrgios	6	6
(United States) R Harrison	3	3
(Italy) F Fognini	6^{3}	6	4
4	(Spain) R Nadal	7^{7}	3	6

Third round
5	(Canada) M Raonic	4	2
9	(Belgium) D Goffin	6	6
16	(Australia) N Kyrgios	3	1
4	(Spain) R Nadal	6	6

Quarterfinals
9	(Belgium) D Goffin	6^{3}	2
4	(Spain) R Nadal	7^{7}	6

==== Section 4 ====
First round
(Spain) A Ramos Viñolas	1	3
(Argentina) D Schwartzman	6	6
(Spain) D Ferrer	2	7^{7}	6
Q	(Kazakhstan) M Kukushkin	6	6^{1}	4
Q	(Russia) A Kuznetsov	6^{5}	7^{7}	5
10	(France) J-W Tsonga	7^{7}	6^{5}	7
15	(France) G Monfils	6	0	6^{0}
(France) G Simon	0	6	7^{7}
Q	(United States) E Escobedo	4	4
(Spain) F López	6	6
WC	(Spain) T Robredo	3	6	1
WC	(Spain) N Almagro	6	3	6

Second round
6	(Japan) K Nishikori	1	6	6
(Argentina) D Schwartzman	6	0	4
(Spain) D Ferrer	w/o
10	(France) J-W Tsonga
(France) G Simon	3	6	6^{3}
(Spain) F López	6	3	7^{7}
WC	(Spain) N Almagro	1	6	5
2	(Serbia) N Djokovic	6	4	7

Third round
6	(Japan) K Nishikori	6	6
(Spain) D Ferrer	4	3
(Spain) F López	4	5
2	(Serbia) N Djokovic	6	7

Quarterfinals
6	(Japan) K Nishikori
2	(Serbia) N Djokovic	w/o

== Qualifying ==
=== Seeds ===
1. (France) Adrian Mannarino (qualified)
2. (Croatia) Borna Ćorić (qualifying competition, lucky loser)
3. (Brazil) Thomaz Bellucci (qualified)
4. (Georgia (country)) Nikoloz Basilashvili (first round)
5. (Italy) Andreas Seppi (qualifying competition)
6. (Uzbekistan) Denis Istomin (qualified)
7. (Russia) Andrey Kuznetsov (qualified)
8. (Kazakhstan) Mikhail Kukushkin (qualified)
9. (United States) Jared Donaldson (qualifying competition, lucky loser)
10. (Brazil) Thiago Monteiro (first round)
11. (Ukraine) Alexandr Dolgopolov (first round)
12. (United States) Ernesto Escobedo (qualified)
13. (France) Pierre-Hugues Herbert (qualified)
14. (Russia) Mikhail Youzhny (qualifying competition)

=== Qualifiers ===
1. (France) Adrian Mannarino
2. (Kazakhstan) Mikhail Kukushkin
3. (Brazil) Thomaz Bellucci
4. (United States) Ernesto Escobedo
5. (France) Pierre-Hugues Herbert
6. (Uzbekistan) Denis Istomin
7. (Russia) Andrey Kuznetsov

=== Lucky losers ===
1. (Croatia) Borna Ćorić
2. (United States) Jared Donaldson

=== Qualifying draw ===
==== First qualifier ====
First round
1	(France) Adrian Mannarino	3	7^{7}	6
WC	(Spain) Jaume Munar	6	6^{3}	3
(Colombia) Santiago Giraldo	6	5	7^{7}
10	(Brazil) Thiago Monteiro	4	7	6^{4}

Qualifying competition
1	(France) Adrian Mannarino	6	7^{7}
(Colombia) Santiago Giraldo	4	6^{2}

==== Second qualifier ====
First round
2	(Croatia) Borna Ćorić	2	7^{7}	6
WC	(Spain) Enrique López Pérez	6	6^{2}	2
Alt	(Spain) Daniel Muñoz de la Nava	6^{5}	6	4
8	(Kazakhstan) Mikhail Kukushkin	7^{7}	3	6

Qualifying competition
2	(Croatia) Borna Ćorić	6^{2}	3
8	(Kazakhstan) Mikhail Kukushkin	7^{7}	6

==== Third qualifier ====
First round
3	(Brazil) Thomaz Bellucci	7^{7}	6
(Russia) Evgeny Donskoy	6^{5}	2
(Spain) Roberto Carballés Baena	6	3	4
14	(Russia) Mikhail Youzhny	3	6	6

Qualifying competition
3	(Brazil) Thomaz Bellucci	6	6
14	(Russia) Mikhail Youzhny	2	3

==== Fourth qualifier ====
First round
4	(Georgia (country)) Nikoloz Basilashvili	5	0
WC	(Spain) Nicola Kuhn	7	6
Alt	(Croatia) Ivan Dodig	0	3
12	(United States) Ernesto Escobedo	6	6

Qualifying competition
WC	(Spain) Nicola Kuhn	3	2
12	(United States) Ernesto Escobedo	6	6

==== Fifth qualifier ====
First round
5	(Italy) Andreas Seppi	6	6
WC	(Spain) Carlos Taberner	3	2
(Poland) Jerzy Janowicz	6^{6}	2
13	(France) Pierre-Hugues Herbert	7^{8}	6

Qualifying competition
5	(Italy) Andreas Seppi	6^{3}	6^{5}
13	(France) Pierre-Hugues Herbert	7^{7}	7^{7}

==== Sixth qualifier ====
First round
6	(Uzbekistan) Denis Istomin	7^{7}	6
(Spain) Íñigo Cervantes	6^{4}	3
(Dominican Republic) Víctor Estrella Burgos	1	5
9	(United States) Jared Donaldson	6	7

Qualifying competition
6	(Uzbekistan) Denis Istomin	7^{7}	6
9	(United States) Jared Donaldson	6^{3}	4

==== Seventh qualifier ====
First round
7	(Russia) Andrey Kuznetsov	6	6
(Norway) Casper Ruud	4	4
(Slovakia) Lukáš Lacko	6	3	7
11	(Ukraine) Alexandr Dolgopolov	4	6	5

Qualifying competition
7	(Russia) Andrey Kuznetsov	6	7^{7}
(Slovakia) Lukáš Lacko	2	6^{0}
