= Jared Donaldson =

American tennis player

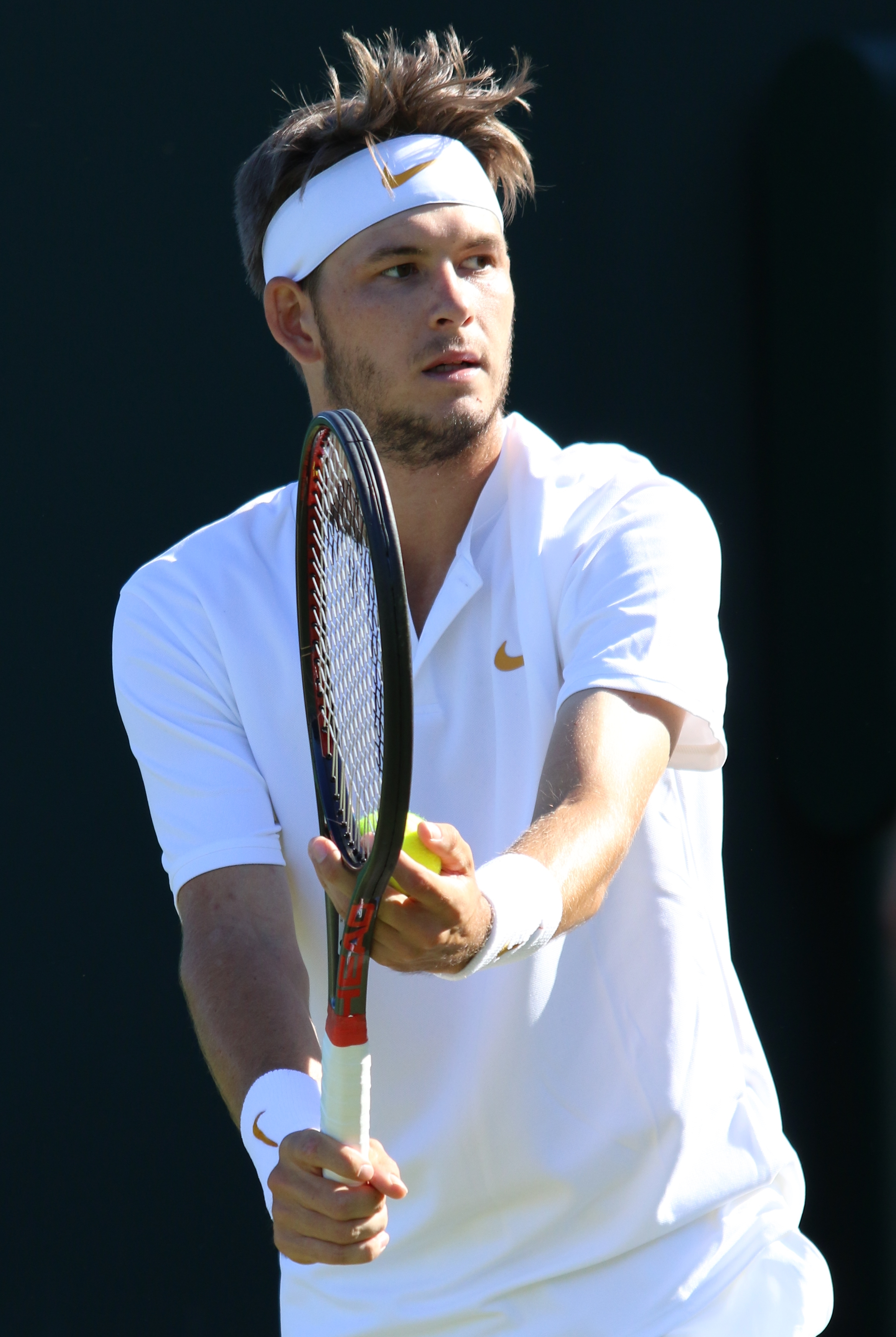
- Donaldson at the 2018 Wimbledon Championships
- Country (sports): United States
- Residence: Glocester, Rhode Island / Irvine, California
- Born: October 9, 1996 (age 29) Providence, Rhode Island
- Height: 1.88 m (6 ft 2 in)
- Turned pro: 2014
- Retired: 2021 (last match played in 2019)
- Plays: Right-handed (two-handed backhand)
- Prize money: US$2,090,322

Singles
- Career record: 47–65
- Career titles: 0
- Highest ranking: No. 48 (5 March 2018)

Grand Slam singles results
- Australian Open: 1R (2017, 2018)
- French Open: 2R (2018)
- Wimbledon: 3R (2017)
- US Open: 3R (2016)

Doubles
- Career record: 1–6
- Career titles: 0
- Highest ranking: No. 327 (2 February 2015)

Grand Slam doubles results
- Wimbledon: 1R (2017)
- US Open: 2R (2014)
- Last updated on: 3 May 2021.

Jared Donaldson (born October 9, 1996) is an American former professional tennis player from Glocester, Rhode Island. Donaldson was the only American to qualify for the inaugural Next Generation ATP Finals at the end of 2017 as the fifth seed. He has won a Challenger title in singles as well as doubles, with both of them having come at the Royal Lahaina Challenger in 2015.

== Junior career ==
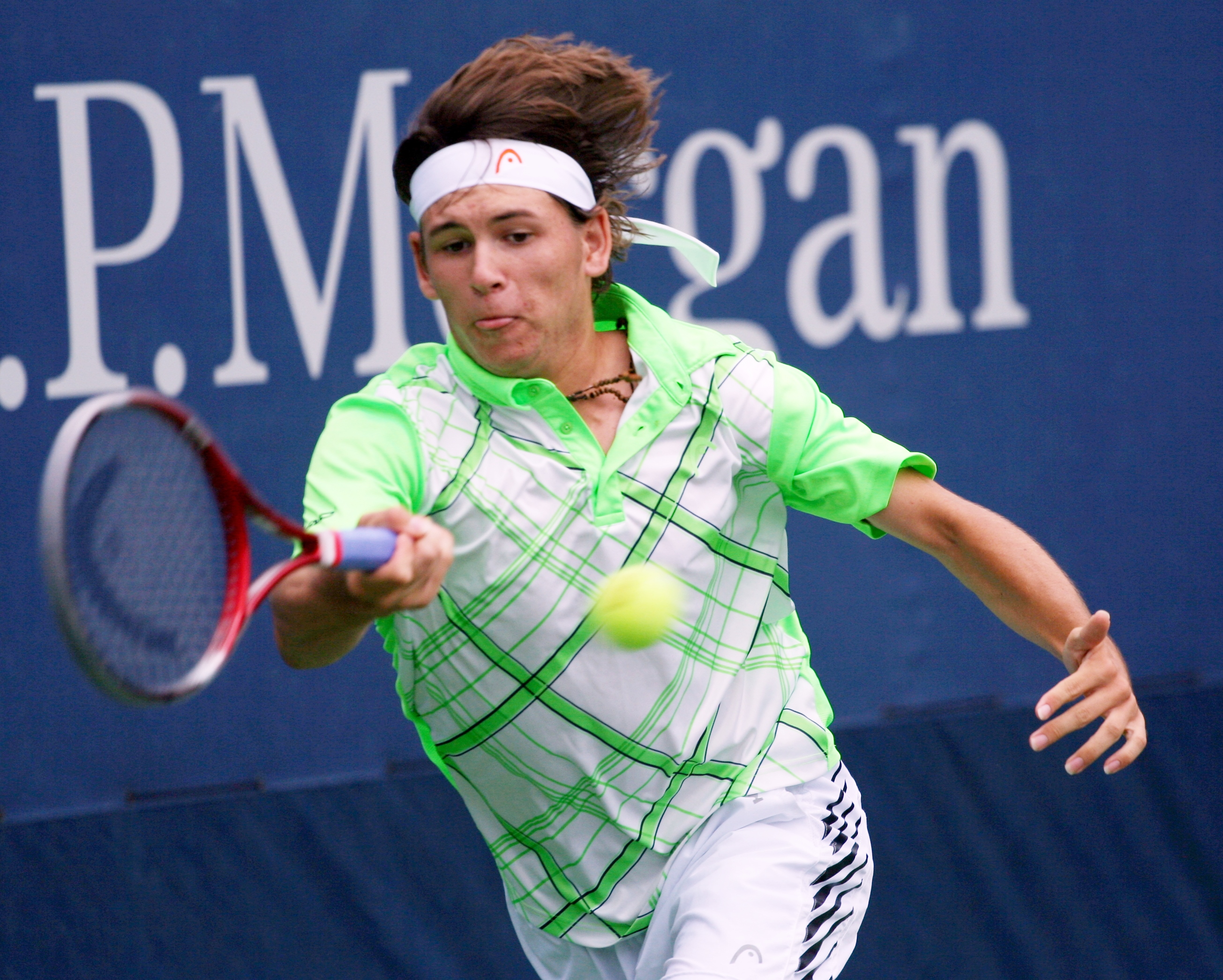
Donaldson at the 2013 US Open

Donaldson trained on the red clay in Buenos Aires for two years instead of following the conventional route of joining a tennis academy or USTA Player Development. His time there dramatically improved his consistency, movement and mental game. Having never claimed any prestigious junior crowns (Orange Bowl, Junior Grand Slams, Les Petits), Donaldson reached the final of the 2013 USTA Boys 18s National Championship at the age of 16, where he lost to Collin Altamirano in straight sets. Donaldson also attended the Gordon School and played middle school tennis there.

== Professional career ==
=== Early years ===
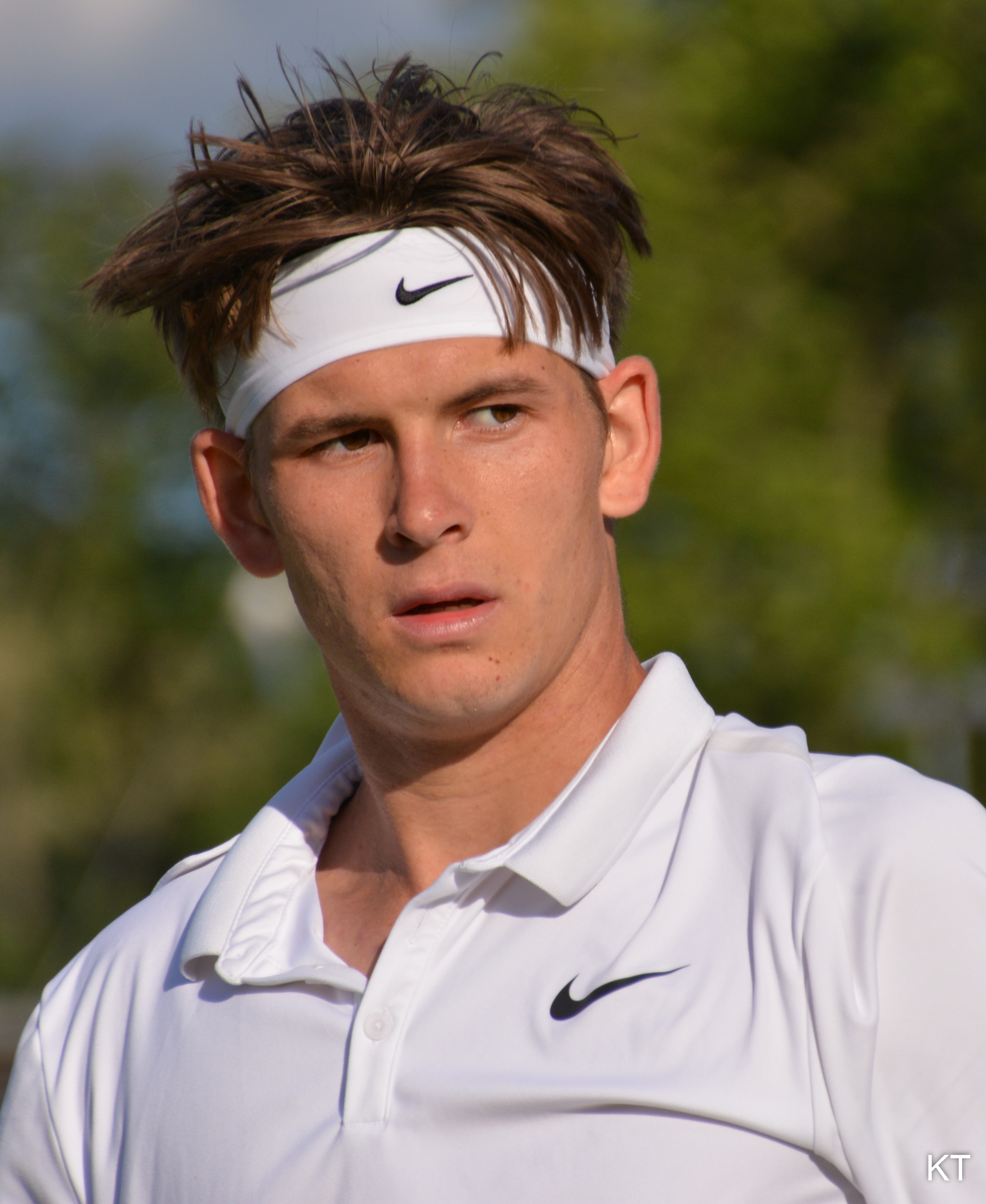
Donaldson at Wimbledon in 2015

At the 2013 US Open, Donaldson reached the final round of qualifying, beating two players in the Top 250.

He continued to play extensively in the Turkey and US Futures circuit until breaking through with three consecutive Futures titles in June 2014. Donaldson then qualified for his first ATP event in Washington, D.C. at the Citi Open. He made an official statement about turning pro instead of playing collegiate tennis on August 22, 2014, just short of his 18th birthday.

He received main draw wildcards into the singles and doubles tournaments at the 2014 US Open. Although he lost to Gaël Monfils in straight sets, he received high praise from many of the tennis elite.

In January 2015, he won his first Challenger title at the 2015 Royal Lahaina Challenger in Maui, allowing him to move into the top 200 of the ATP rankings. He also won the doubles title in Maui with partner Stefan Kozlov. The following month, he won his first ATP level match at the 2015 Memphis Open, this time defeating Kozlov.

=== 2016: Top 100 ===
Donaldson made it through qualifying at the US Open. He then recorded the biggest win of his career, knocking off 12th-seeded David Goffin in the first round. He then beat Viktor Troicki before losing to Ivo Karlović in the third round, which was enough to push him into the top 100 of the ATP rankings for the first time.

=== 2017: First Masters 1000 quarterfinal, ATP Tour-level consistency, Top 50 debut ===
With a higher ranking and consistent success, Donaldson was able to play primarily in ATP Tour level events throughout the year. He solidified his position in the Top 100 by reaching the fourth round of the Miami Open as a qualifier, rising from No. 95 to No. 73 in the ATP rankings. After a relatively quiet clay court season, Donaldson continued his climb in the rankings by making it to the third round at Wimbledon. Later in the summer, he scored two of the biggest wins of his career over No. 18 Lucas Pouille and No. 14 Roberto Bautista Agut in the first round at the 2017 Canada Open and 2017 Cincinnati Masters respectively, where in the latter he reached the quarterfinals at a Masters level event for the first time. These two successful runs helped to catapult Donaldson to a then career high ATP ranking of No. 50 in the world on 23 October 2017.

=== 2018: First ATP semifinal ===
Donaldson's first big result of the year came at the Mexican Open, an ATP 500 event. He made it through to his first ATP semifinal to reach a new career high ranking of No. 48.

=== 2019: Comeback & Career suspension ===
Donaldson came back at the 2019 Delray Beach Open but was forced later in the year to suspend his professional career after continuing struggles with Patellar tendinitis.

== Coaching career ==
In January 2022, Donaldson attended University of California and began working as the Volunteer Assistant Coach.

== Playing style ==
Unlike many of his other top American contemporaries (such as John Isner and Jack Sock, among others) whose success relied on big serves and forehands, Donaldson's strength was in his return game. In the 2017 season, Donaldson was the 6th-highest ranked American (51st overall). He rated behind all five above him in serving, but was the best returner out of the group at 32nd on the tour, according to Infosys Nia Data.

== ATP Challenger and ITF Futures finals ==
=== Singles: 7 (4–3) ===
Legend (singles) ATP Challenger Tour (1–2) ITF Futures Tour (3–1)	Titles by surface Hard (3–1) Clay (1–2) Grass (0–0)

Result	W–L	Date	Tournament	Tier	Surface	Opponent	Score
Win	1–0	Jan 2015	Tennis Championships of Maui, USA	Challenger	Hard	(United States) Nicolas Meister	6–1, 6–4
Loss	1–1	Oct 2015	Natomas Men's Professional Tennis Tournament, USA	Challenger	Hard	(United States) Taylor Fritz	4–6, 6–3, 4–6
Loss	1–2	Apr 2016	Savannah Challenger, USA	Challenger	Clay	(United States) Bjorn Fratangelo	1–6, 3–6

Result	W–L	Date	Tournament	Tier	Surface	Opponent	Score
Loss	0–1	Mar 2014	Turkey F7, Antalya	Futures	Clay	(Spain) Jordi Samper Montaña	2–6, 6–7^{(4–7)}
Win	1–1	Jun 2014	Turkey F19, Bodrum	Futures	Clay	(Serbia) Nikola Milojević	6–3, 6–4
Win	2–1	Jun 2014	USA F15, Tulsa	Futures	Hard	(United States) Jarmere Jenkins	4–6, 6–3, 7–5
Win	3–1	Jun 2014	USA F17, Oklahoma City	Futures	Hard	(Australia) Andrew Harris	6–3, 6–2

=== Doubles: 2 (1–1) ===
Legend (doubles) ATP Challenger Tour (1–0) ITF Futures Tour (0–1)	Titles by surface Hard (1–1) Clay (0–0) Grass (0–0)

Result	W–L	Date	Tournament	Tier	Surface	Partner	Opponents	Score
Win	1–0	Jan 2015	Tennis Championships of Maui, USA	Challenger	Hard	(United States) Stefan Kozlov	(United States) Chase Buchanan (United States) Rhyne Williams	6–3, 6–4

Result	W–L	Date	Tournament	Tier	Surface	Partner	Opponents	Score
Loss	0–1	Jun 2014	USA F15, Tulsa	Futures	Hard	(Libya) Farris Fathi Gosea	(United States) Dennis Novikov (United States) Eric Quigley	6–7^{(5–7)}, 3–6

== Performance timelines ==
Key
W	F	SF	QF	#R	RR	Q#	P#	DNQ	A	Z#	PO	G	S	B	NMS	NTI	P	NH

(W) winner; (F) finalist; (SF) semifinalist; (QF) quarterfinalist; (#R) rounds 4, 3, 2, 1; (RR) round-robin stage; (Q#) qualification round; (P#) preliminary round; (DNQ) did not qualify; (A) absent; (Z#) Davis/Fed Cup Zonal Group (with number indication) or (PO) play-off; (G) gold, (S) silver or (B) bronze Olympic/Paralympic medal; (NMS) not a Masters tournament; (NTI) not a Tier I tournament; (P) postponed; (NH) not held; (SR) strike rate (events won / competed); (W–L) win–loss record.
To avoid confusion and double counting, these charts are updated at the conclusion of a tournament or when the player's participation has ended.

=== Singles ===
Tournament	2013	2014	2015	2016	2017	2018	2019	SR	W–L	Win%
Grand Slam tournaments
Australian Open	A	A	Q2	Q1	1R	1R	A	0 / 2	0–2	0%
French Open	A	A	Q3	Q3	1R	2R	A	0 / 2	1–2	33%
Wimbledon	A	A	Q1	A	3R	2R	A	0 / 2	3–2	60%
US Open	Q3	1R	1R	3R	2R	A	A	0 / 4	3–4	43%
Win–loss	0–0	0–1	0–1	2–1	3–4	2–3	0–0	0 / 10	7–10	41%
ATP World Tour Masters 1000
Indian Wells Masters	A	A	Q1	1R	Q1	2R	2R	0 / 3	2–3	40%
Miami Open	A	A	A	1R	4R	3R	Q1	0 / 3	4–3	57%
Monte-Carlo Masters	A	A	A	A	A	1R	A	0 / 1	0–1	0%
Madrid Open	A	A	A	A	2R	1R	A	0 / 2	1–2	33%
Italian Open	A	A	A	A	1R	1R	A	0 / 2	0–2	0%
Canadian Open	A	A	A	3R	3R	1R	A	0 / 3	4–3	57%
Cincinnati Masters	A	A	2R	2R	QF	A	A	0 / 3	5–3	63%
Shanghai Masters	A	A	A	Q1	2R	A	A	0 / 1	1–1	50%
Paris Masters	A	A	A	A	Q1	A	A	0 / 0	0–0	–
Win–loss	0–0	0–0	1–1	3–4	9–6	3–6	1–1	0 / 18	17–18	49%
Career statistics
Tournaments	0	2	7	10	25	19	2	Career total: 65		
Overall win–loss	0–0	0–2	4–7	7–10	21–25	14–19	1–2	47–65		41.96%
Year-end ranking	730	261	134	105	54	111	720			
