= 2011 Honolulu Challenger =

- Date: 24–30 January
- Edition: 2nd
- Location: Honolulu, United States

Champions

Singles
- (United States) Ryan Harrison

Doubles
- (United States) Ryan Harrison / (United States) Travis Rettenmaier
← 2010 ·	Honolulu Challenger	· 2012 →

The 2011 Honolulu Challenger was a professional tennis tournament played on hard courts. It was the second edition of the tournament which is part of the 2011 ATP Challenger Tour. It took place in Honolulu, United States between 24 and 30 January 2011.

== Singles main-draw entrants ==
=== Seeds ===
Country	Player	Rank^{1}	Seed
USA	Michael Russell	100	1
USA	Robert Kendrick	110	2
USA	Ryan Sweeting	116	3
SVN	Grega Žemlja	141	4
USA	Bobby Reynolds	157	5
USA	Ryan Harrison	172	6
USA	Tim Smyczek	173	7
USA	Jesse Witten	224	8

- Rankings are as of January 17, 2011.

=== Other entrants ===
The following players received wildcards into the singles main draw:

- (United States) Devin Britton
- (United States) Austin Krajicek
- (United States) Dennis Lajola
- (France) Jérémy Tweedt

The following players received entry from the qualifying draw:

- (Chinese Taipei) Chen Ti
- (Slovenia) Luka Gregorc
- (South Korea) Jun Woong-sun
- (Haiti) Olivier Sajous

== Champions ==
=== Singles ===
(United States) Ryan Harrison def. (United States) Alex Kuznetsov, 6–4, 3–6, 6–4

=== Doubles ===
(United States) Ryan Harrison / (United States) Travis Rettenmaier def. (United States) Robert Kendrick / (United States) Alex Kuznetsov, walkover
