= 2010 Honolulu Challenger =

- Date: January 25 – January 31
- Edition: 1st
- Location: Honolulu, Hawaii, United States

Champions

Singles
- (United States) Michael Russell

Doubles
- (South Africa) Kevin Anderson / (United States) Ryler DeHeart
Honolulu Challenger	· 2011 →

The 2010 Honolulu Challenger was a professional tennis tournament played on outdoor hard courts. It was part of the 2010 ATP Challenger Tour. It took place in Honolulu, Hawaii between 25 and 31 January 2010.

== ATP entrants ==
=== Seeds ===
Country	Player	Rank^{1}	Seed
USA	Michael Russell	90	1
USA	Kevin Kim	108	2
USA	Jesse Levine	110	3
USA	Robert Kendrick	138	4
RSA	Kevin Anderson	148	5
USA	Michael Yani	159	6
USA	Jesse Witten	163	7
USA	Ryan Sweeting	166	8

- Rankings are as of January 18, 2010

=== Other entrants ===
The following players received wildcards into the singles main draw:

- (Germany) Hendrik Bode
- (United States) Michael McClune
- (United States) Leo Rosenberg

The following players received entry from the qualifying draw:

- (Bulgaria) Grigor Dimitrov
- (United States) Jan-Michael Gambill
- (Croatia) Nikola Mektić
- (Chinese Taipei) Yang Tsung-hua

The following player received the lucky loser spot:

- (New Zealand) Daniel King-Turner
- (United States) Tim Smyczek

== Champions ==
=== Singles ===
- (United States) Michael Russell def. (Slovenia) Grega Žemlja, 6–0, 6–3

=== Doubles ===
- (South Africa) Kevin Anderson / (United States) Ryler DeHeart def. (South Korea) Im Kyu-tae / (Austria) Martin Slanar, 3–6, 7–6^{(7–2)}, [15–13]
