= 2013 Maui Challenger – Singles =

Singles
- 2013 Maui Challenger

Final
- Champion: (Japan) Go Soeda
- Runner-up: (Germany) Mischa Zverev
- Score: 7–5, 7–5

Events
Singles	Doubles
← 2012 ·	Maui Challenger	· 2014 →

Go Soeda successfully defended his title, defeating Mischa Zverev 7–5, 7–5 in the final.

== Seeds ==
1. (Japan) Go Soeda (champion)
2. (Japan) Tatsuma Ito (first round)
3. (United States) Michael Russell (semifinals)
4. (United States) Tim Smyczek (semifinals)
5. (Russia) Alex Bogomolov Jr. (quarterfinals)
6. (United States) Denis Kudla (quarterfinals)
7. (Brazil) Thiago Alves (second round)
8. (United States) Ryan Sweeting (first round)

== Draw ==
=== Key ===
- Q = Qualifier
- WC = Wild card
- LL = Lucky loser
- Alt = Alternate
- SE = Special exempt
- PR = Protected ranking
- ITF = ITF entry
- JE = Junior exempt
- w/o = Walkover
- r = Retired
- d = Defaulted
- SR = Special ranking

=== Finals ===
Semifinals
1	(Japan) Go Soeda	6	6
4	(United States) Tim Smyczek	2	3
3	(United States) Michael Russell	5	3
(Germany) Mischa Zverev	7	6

Final
1	(Japan) Go Soeda	7	7
(Germany) Mischa Zverev	5	5

=== Top half ===
First round
1	(Japan) G Soeda	6	6
WC	(United States) D Lajola	3	1
WC	(Czech Republic) Petr Michnev	6	3	6
(United States) D Zivkovic	3	6	3
(United States) A Krajicek	6	6
(France) J Eysseric	3	0
(United States) B Klahn	6	6
8	(United States) R Sweeting	3	4
4	(United States) T Smyczek	6	6
(Chinese Taipei) T-h Yang	2	2
WC	(United States) D Britton	0	1
(United States) R Williams	6	6
Q	(Australia) C Ball	6	3	4
(United States) S Johnson	4	6	6
Q	(South Africa) J Andersen	2	6^{5}
7	(Brazil) T Alves	6	7^{7}

Second round
1	(Japan) G Soeda	7^{7}	6
WC	(Czech Republic) P Michnev	6^{4}	1
(United States) A Krajicek	1	6^{7}
(United States) B Klahn	6	7^{9}
4	(United States) T Smyczek	3	6	6
(United States) R Williams	6	2	1
(United States) S Johnson	6	6
7	(Brazil) T Alves	3	3

Quarterfinals
1	(Japan) G Soeda	6	6
(United States) B Klahn	4	4
4	(United States) T Smyczek	6	6
(United States) S Johnson	3	3

Semifinals
1	(Japan) G Soeda	6	6
4	(United States) T Smyczek	2	3

=== Bottom half ===
First round
6	(United States) D Kudla	2	6	7
(United States) D Kosakowski	6	3	5
(United States) T Sandgren	6	7^{12}
(Slovenia) B Rola	1	6^{10}
Q	(Japan) H Kondo	2	7^{7}	3
(United States) A Kuznetsov	6	6^{5}	6
(United States) D Young	0^{r}
3	(United States) M Russell	4
5	(Russia) A Bogomolov	6	6
(United States) M McClune	4	3
WC	(China) Ma Rong	3	4
(Canada) P Polansky	6	6
Q	(Japan) T Niki	5	7^{7}	4
(South Korea) S-y Jeong	7	6^{3}	6
(Germany) M Zverev	4	6	6
2	(Japan) T Ito	6	3	4

Second round
6	(United States) D Kudla	7^{7}	7^{7}
(United States) T Sandgren	6^{1}	6^{3}
(United States) A Kuznetsov	6	5	3
3	(United States) M Russell	0	7	6
5	(Russia) A Bogomolov	6	7^{7}
(Canada) P Polansky	3	6^{4}
(South Korea) S-y Jeong	4	0
(Germany) M Zverev	6	6

Quarterfinals
6	(United States) D Kudla	4	1
3	(United States) M Russell	6	6
5	(Russia) A Bogomolov	4	1
(Germany) M Zverev	6	6

Semifinals
3	(United States) M Russell	5	3
(Germany) M Zverev	7	6
