= 2012 Honolulu Challenger – Singles =

Singles
- 2012 Honolulu Challenger

Final
- Champion: (Japan) Go Soeda
- Runner-up: (United States) Robby Ginepri
- Score: 6–3, 7–6^{(7–5)}

Events
Singles	Doubles
← 2011 ·	Honolulu Challenger	· 2013 →

Ryan Harrison was the defending champion, but chose not to participate.

Go Soeda won the title, defeating Robby Ginepri in the final 6–3, 7–6^{(7–5)}.

== Seeds ==
1. (Japan) Go Soeda (champion)
2. (United States) Bobby Reynolds (second round)
3. (Japan) Tatsuma Ito (semifinals)
4. (United States) Alex Kuznetsov (second round)
5. (United States) Michael Yani (second round)
6. (Chinese Taipei) Yang Tsung-hua (first round)
7. (Japan) Yuichi Sugita (semifinals)
8. (Bosnia and Herzegovina) Amer Delić (quarterfinals)

== Draw ==
=== Key ===
- Q = Qualifier
- WC = Wild card
- LL = Lucky loser
- Alt = Alternate
- ITF = ITF entry
- PR = Protected ranking
- SR = Special ranking
- SE = Special exempt
- JE = Junior exempt
- JR = Junior Accelerator Programme entrant
- CO = College Accelerator Programme entrant
- NG = Next Gen Accelerator Program entrant
- w/o = Walkover
- r = Retired
- d = Defaulted

=== Finals ===
Semifinals
1	(Japan) Go Soeda	6	6
3	(Japan) Tatsuma Ito	3	4
7	(Japan) Yuichi Sugita	6	5	2
(United States) Robby Ginepri	2	7	6

Final
1	(Japan) Go Soeda	6	7^{7}
(United States) Robby Ginepri	3	6^{5}

=== Top half ===
First round
1	(Japan) G Soeda	7^{7}	6
(Germany) A Begemann	6^{3}	1
(Slovakia) K Čapkovič	6	6
(South Korea) Y-k Lim	4	2
WC	(United States) D Lajola	3	2
WC	(United States) J Sock	6	6
(South Africa) F Wolmarans	6	5	3
5	(United States) M Yani	2	7	6
3	(Japan) T Ito	6	6^{5}	6
Q	(United States) K Kim	4	7^{7}	3
Q	(United States) M McClune	5	3
(Canada) P Polansky	7	6
(United States) R Kendrick	2	6	3
(New Zealand) M Venus	6	4	6
(United States) D Kudla	6^{5}	6	6
6	(Chinese Taipei) T-h Yang	7^{7}	3	3

Second round
1	(Japan) G Soeda	6	6
(Slovakia) K Čapkovič	3	2
WC	(United States) J Sock	6	6
5	(United States) M Yani	1	1
3	(Japan) T Ito	6	2	6
(Canada) P Polansky	4	6	0
(New Zealand) M Venus	3	4
(United States) D Kudla	6	6

Quarterfinals
1	(Japan) G Soeda	6	2	6
WC	(United States) J Sock	2	6	2
3	(Japan) T Ito	6	6
(United States) D Kudla	4	3

Semifinals
1	(Japan) G Soeda	6	6
3	(Japan) T Ito	3	4

=== Bottom half ===
First round
7	(Japan) Y Sugita	6	6
(India) Y Bhambri	4	2
(Canada) P-L Duclos	2	6	7
Alt	(United States) B Strode	6	4	5
(United Kingdom) A Bogdanovic	3	6	2
(United States) T Smyczek	6	4	6
(United States) N Monroe	5	6	1
4/WC	(United States) A Kuznetsov	7	1	6
8	(Bosnia and Herzegovina) A Delić	6	6
Q	(Zimbabwe) T Garanganga	4	3
Q	(Haiti) O Sajous	6	6
(France) Axel Michon	4	3
(United States) S Johnson	2	4
(United States) R Ginepri	6	6
WC	(United States) Leo Rosenberg	4	4
2	(United States) B Reynolds	6	6

Second round
7	(Japan) Y Sugita	5	6	6
(Canada) P-L Duclos	7	2	4
(United States) T Smyczek	6	6
4/WC	(United States) A Kuznetsov	3	3
8	(Bosnia and Herzegovina) A Delić	6	6
Q	(Haiti) O Sajous	2	2
(United States) R Ginepri	6	6
2	(United States) B Reynolds	2	2

Quarterfinals
7	(Japan) Y Sugita	7	2	7
(United States) T Smyczek	5	6	5
8	(Bosnia and Herzegovina) A Delić	4	4
(United States) R Ginepri	6	6

Semifinals
7	(Japan) Y Sugita	6	5	2
(United States) R Ginepri	2	7	6
