= 2016 Tennis Championships of Maui – Women's doubles =

Women's doubles
- 2016 Tennis Championships of Maui

Final
- Champions: (United States) Asia Muhammad (United States) Maria Sanchez
- Runners-up: (United States) Jessica Pegula (United States) Taylor Townsend
- Score: 6–2, 3–6, [10–6]

Events
Singles	men	women
Doubles	men	women
← 2015 ·	Tennis Championships of Maui	· 2017 →

This was a new event added to the ITF Women's Circuit in 2016.

Asia Muhammad and Maria Sanchez won the title, defeating Jessica Pegula and Taylor Townsend in an all-American final 6–2, 3–6, [10–6].

== Seeds ==
1. (United States) Asia Muhammad / (United States) Maria Sanchez (champions)
2. (Ukraine) Lyudmyla Kichenok / (Poland) Magda Linette (quarterfinals)
3. (United Kingdom) Naomi Broady / (Poland) Paula Kania (semifinals)
4. (Belgium) Ysaline Bonaventure / (United States) Sachia Vickery (first round)

== Draw ==
=== Key ===
- Q = Qualifier
- WC = Wild card
- LL = Lucky loser
- Alt = Alternate
- SE = Special exempt
- PR = Protected ranking
- ITF = ITF entry
- JE = Junior exempt
- w/o = Walkover
- r = Retired
- d = Defaulted
- SR = Special ranking

First round
1	(United States) A Muhammad (United States) M Sanchez	w/o
WC	(Czech Republic) K Hančarová (Australia) N Hoynaski
(United States) B Boren (Mexico) S León	6	6
(United States) E Able (United States) KK Vyrlan	2	3
4	(Belgium) Y Bonaventure (United States) S Vickery	4	5
(Japan) M Hibi (Chinese Taipei) C-w Hsu	6	7
Alt	(Chinese Taipei) S-y Hsieh (China) N Zhang	5	1
(United States) J Cako (United States) D Lao	7	6
(United States) M Gordon (United States) C Liu	6	6
(United States) S Luk (United States) T Parravi	3	1
(United States) J Brady (United States) C McHale	0	6	[3]
3	(United Kingdom) N Broady (Poland) P Kania	6	3	[10]
(United States) J Pegula (United States) T Townsend	6	6
(United States) J Failla (Japan) N Hanatani	1	2
(Japan) A Okuno (Hong Kong) L Zhang	3	4
2	(Ukraine) L Kichenok (Poland) M Linette	6	6

Quarterfinals
1	(United States) A Muhammad (United States) M Sanchez	6	6
(United States) B Boren (Mexico) S León	1	3
(Japan) M Hibi (Chinese Taipei) C-w Hsu	4	7	[7]
(United States) J Cako (United States) D Lao	6	5	[10]
(United States) M Gordon (United States) C Liu	5	4
3	(United Kingdom) N Broady (Poland) P Kania	7	6
(United States) J Pegula (United States) T Townsend	6	6
2	(Ukraine) L Kichenok (Poland) M Linette	2	3

Semifinals
1	(United States) A Muhammad (United States) M Sanchez	6	4	[10]
(United States) J Cako (United States) D Lao	4	6	[6]
3	(United Kingdom) N Broady (Poland) P Kania	6	3	[10]
(United States) J Pegula (United States) T Townsend	2	6	[12]

Final
1	(United States) A Muhammad (United States) M Sanchez	6	3	[10]
(United States) J Pegula (United States) T Townsend	2	6	[6]
