= 2013 Maui Challenger – Doubles =

Doubles
- 2013 Maui Challenger

Final
- Champions: (Chinese Taipei) Lee Hsin-han (Chinese Taipei) Peng Hsien-yin
- Runners-up: (United States) Tennys Sandgren (United States) Rhyne Williams
- Score: 6–7^{(1–7)}, 6–2, [10–5]

Events
Singles	Doubles
← 2012 ·	Maui Challenger	· 2014 →

Amer Delić and Travis Rettenmaier were the defending champions but decided not to participate.
Lee Hsin-han and Peng Hsien-yin defeated Tennys Sandgren and Rhyne Williams 6–7^{(1–7)}, 6–2, [10–5] in the final to win the title.

== Seeds ==
1. (United States) Devin Britton / (United States) Austin Krajicek (first round)
2. (Russia) Alex Bogomolov Jr. / (United States) Steve Johnson (semifinals)
3. (Chinese Taipei) Lee Hsin-han / (Chinese Taipei) Peng Hsien-yin (Champions)
4. (United States) Nicholas Monroe / (United States) Donald Young (quarterfinals)

== Draw ==
=== Key ===
- Q = Qualifier
- WC = Wild card
- LL = Lucky loser
- Alt = Alternate
- SE = Special exempt
- PR = Protected ranking
- ITF = ITF entry
- JE = Junior exempt
- w/o = Walkover
- r = Retired
- d = Defaulted
- SR = Special ranking

=== Draw ===
First round
1	(United States) D Britton (United States) A Krajicek	6	4	[5]
(United States) B Klahn (United States) D Kudla	4	6	[10]
(Brazil) T Alves (Chinese Taipei) T-h Yang	3	4
(South Africa) J Andersen (United States) V Mirzadeh	6	6
4	(United States) N Monroe (United States) D Young	7	1	[10]
WC	(United States) D Kosakowski (United States) M McClune	5	6	[7]
(United States) T Sandgren (United States) R Williams	6	6
Q	(Czech Republic) Petr Michnev (United States) Gerald Moretti	1	4
(Australia) C Ball (Canada) P Polansky	6	6
(Japan) T Ito (Japan) H Kondo	4	3
(United States) T Smyczek (United States) R Sweeting	1	7^{7}	[6]
3	(Chinese Taipei) H-h Lee (Chinese Taipei) H-y Peng	6	6^{2}	[10]
WC	(Sweden) Mikael Maata (Denmark) Jan Tribler	3	5
WC	(United States) Rick Kepler (United States) D Lajola	6	7
(United States) A Kuznetsov (Germany) M Zverev	3	0
2	(Russia) A Bogomolov Jr. (United States) S Johnson	6	6

Quarterfinals
(United States) B Klahn (United States) D Kudla	4	4
(South Africa) J Andersen (United States) V Mirzadeh	6	6
4	(United States) N Monroe (United States) D Young	6	2	[3]
(United States) T Sandgren (United States) R Williams	1	6	[10]
(Australia) C Ball (Canada) P Polansky	4	4
3	(Chinese Taipei) H-h Lee (Chinese Taipei) H-y Peng	6	6
WC	(United States) R Kepler (United States) D Lajola	3	4
2	(Russia) A Bogomolov Jr. (United States) S Johnson	6	6

Semifinals
(South Africa) J Andersen (United States) V Mirzadeh	2	4
(United States) T Sandgren (United States) R Williams	6	6
3	(Chinese Taipei) H-h Lee (Chinese Taipei) H-y Peng	6^{8}	6	[10]
2	(Russia) A Bogomolov Jr. (United States) S Johnson	7^{10}	2	[7]

Final
(United States) T Sandgren (United States) R Williams	7^{7}	2	[5]
3	(Chinese Taipei) H-h Lee (Chinese Taipei) H-y Peng	6^{1}	6	[10]
