= 2012 Honolulu Challenger – Doubles =

Doubles
- 2012 Honolulu Challenger

Final
- Champions: (Bosnia and Herzegovina) Amer Delić (United States) Travis Rettenmaier
- Runners-up: (United States) Nicholas Monroe (United States) Jack Sock
- Score: 6–4, 7–6^{(7–3)}

Events
Singles	Doubles
← 2011 ·	Honolulu Challenger	· 2013 →

Ryan Harrison and Travis Rettenmaier were the defending champions but Harrison decided not to participate.
Rettenmaier played alongside Amer Delić and successfully defended his title defeating Nicholas Monroe and Jack Sock in the final 6–4, 7–6^{(7–3)}.

== Seeds ==
1. (Canada) Pierre-Ludovic Duclos / (United States) John Paul Fruttero (first round)
2. (United States) Maciek Sykut / (United States) Dennis Zivkovic (quarterfinals)
3. (United States) Nicholas Monroe / (United States) Jack Sock (final)
4. (Chinese Taipei) Lee Hsin-han / (Japan) Bumpei Sato (semifinals)

== Draw ==
=== Key ===
- Q = Qualifier
- WC = Wild card
- LL = Lucky loser
- Alt = Alternate
- SE = Special exempt
- PR = Protected ranking
- ITF = ITF entry
- JE = Junior exempt
- w/o = Walkover
- r = Retired
- d = Defaulted
- SR = Special ranking

=== Draw ===
First round
1	(Canada) P-L Duclos (United States) JP Fruttero	6	2	[7]
(Indonesia) C Rungkat (Japan) Y Sugita	3	6	[10]
WC	(United States) D Lajola (United States) M McClune	3	2
(Bosnia and Herzegovina) A Delić (United States) T Rettenmaier	6	6
4	(Chinese Taipei) H-h Lee (Japan) B Sato	6	6
(Japan) T Ito (Japan) G Soeda	4	2
(Canada) P Polansky (United States) T Smyczek	6	7
WC	(Sweden) Mikael Maatta (Denmark) Jan Tribler	2	5
Q	(New Zealand) D King-Turner (New Zealand) M Venus	6	6
(India) Y Bhambri (Slovakia) K Čapkovič	3	2
WC	(Germany) Hendrik Bode (United States) Ikaika Jobe	2	4
3	(United States) N Monroe (United States) J Sock	6	6
(United States) R Kendrick (United States) B Reynolds	6	6
(United States) A Kuznetsov (United States) M Yani	4	4
(Germany) A Begemann (South Africa) F Wolmarans
2	(United States) M Sykut (United States) D Zivkovic	w/o

Quarterfinals
(Indonesia) C Rungkat (Japan) Y Sugita	1	6	[13]
(Bosnia and Herzegovina) A Delić (United States) T Rettenmaier	6	2	[15]
4	(Chinese Taipei) H-h Lee (Japan) B Sato	6	6
(Canada) P Polansky (United States) T Smyczek	0	0
Q	(New Zealand) D King-Turner (New Zealand) M Venus	1	3
3	(United States) N Monroe (United States) J Sock	6	6
(United States) R Kendrick (United States) B Reynolds	6	7^{7}
2	(United States) M Sykut (United States) D Zivkovic	4	6^{4}

Semifinals
(Bosnia and Herzegovina) A Delić (United States) T Rettenmaier	6	7
4	(Chinese Taipei) H-h Lee (Japan) B Sato	3	5
3	(United States) N Monroe (United States) J Sock	6	7^{7}
(United States) R Kendrick (United States) B Reynolds	3	6^{3}

Final
(Bosnia and Herzegovina) A Delić (United States) T Rettenmaier	6	7^{7}
3	(United States) N Monroe (United States) J Sock	4	6^{3}
