= 2017 Tennis Championships of Maui – Doubles =

Doubles
- 2017 Tennis Championships of Maui

Final
- Champions: (United States) Austin Krajicek (United States) Jackson Withrow
- Runners-up: (United States) Bradley Klahn (United States) Tennys Sandgren
- Score: 6–4, 6–3

Events
Singles	Doubles
← 2016 ·	Tennis Championships of Maui	· 2018 →

Jason Jung and Dennis Novikov were the defending champions but only Novikov chose to defend his title, partnering Julio Peralta. Novikov lost in the semifinals to Austin Krajicek and Jackson Withrow.

Krajicek and Withrow won the title after defeating Bradley Klahn and Tennys Sandgren 6–4, 6–3 in the final.

== Seeds ==
1. (United States) Dennis Novikov / (Chile) Julio Peralta (semifinals)
2. (China) Gong Maoxin / (China) Zhang Ze (semifinals)
3. (India) Jeevan Nedunchezhiyan / (Indonesia) Christopher Rungkat (first round)
4. (Philippines) Ruben Gonzales / (Japan) Toshihide Matsui (first round)

== Draw ==
=== Key ===
- Q = Qualifier
- WC = Wild card
- LL = Lucky loser
- Alt = Alternate
- SE = Special exempt
- PR = Protected ranking
- ITF = ITF entry
- JE = Junior exempt
- w/o = Walkover
- r = Retired
- d = Defaulted
- SR = Special ranking

First round
1	(United States) D Novikov (Chile) J Peralta	6	6
WC	(Czech Republic) Filip Doležel (Czech Republic) Jakub Hadrava	3	2
(United States) M Mmoh (United States) T Paul	4	0
(United Kingdom) L Bambridge (United Kingdom) J Salisbury	6	6
3	(India) J Nedunchezhiyan (Indonesia) C Rungkat	6	6^{4}	[6]
(United States) E Escobedo (United States) M McDonald	4	7^{7}	[10]
(China) Z Li (New Zealand) J Statham	6	4	[7]
(United States) A Krajicek (United States) J Withrow	3	6	[10]
(Switzerland) M Chiudinelli (Japan) T Ito	6	6
WC	(Germany) Hendrik Bode (France) Yann Renault	3	4
WC	(United States) B Klahn (United States) T Sandgren	6	7^{7}
4	(Philippines) R Gonzales (Japan) T Matsui	3	6^{4}
(Japan) Y Sugita (China) D Wu	3	0
Q	(United States) JP Fruttero (China) Xia Zihao	6	6
(United Kingdom) C Norrie (New Zealand) F Tearney	3	1
2	(China) M Gong (China) Z Zhang	6	6

Quarterfinals
1	(United States) D Novikov (Chile) J Peralta	6^{3}	6	[13]
(United Kingdom) L Bambridge (United Kingdom) J Salisbury	7^{7}	4	[11]
(United States) E Escobedo (United States) M McDonald	4	4
(United States) A Krajicek (United States) J Withrow	6	6
(Switzerland) M Chiudinelli (Japan) T Ito	6	6^{4}	[4]
WC	(United States) B Klahn (United States) T Sandgren	4	7^{7}	[10]
Q	(United States) JP Fruttero (China) Z Xia	6	2	[10]
2	(China) M Gong (China) Z Zhang	3	6	[12]

Semifinals
1	(United States) D Novikov (Chile) J Peralta	6	3	[5]
(United States) A Krajicek (United States) J Withrow	3	6	[10]
WC	(United States) B Klahn (United States) T Sandgren	6	6
2	(China) M Gong (China) Z Zhang	1	1

Final
(United States) A Krajicek (United States) J Withrow	6	6
WC	(United States) B Klahn (United States) T Sandgren	4	3
