= 2010 Honolulu Challenger – Singles =

Singles
- 2010 Honolulu Challenger

Final
- Champion: (United States) Michael Russell
- Runner-up: (Slovenia) Grega Žemlja
- Score: 6–0, 6–3

Events
Singles	Doubles
Honolulu Challenger	· 2011 →

The Honolulu Challenger Singles division was a tennis tournament held in 2010. This division was for single tennis players. Michael Russell won in the final 6–0, 6–3 against Grega Žemlja.

== Seeds ==
1. (United States) Michael Russell (champion)
2. (United States) Kevin Kim (quarterfinals)
3. (United States) Jesse Levine (first round)
4. (United States) Robert Kendrick (semifinals)
5. (South Africa) Kevin Anderson (semifinals)
6. (United States) Michael Yani (first round)
7. (United States) Jesse Witten (first round)
8. (United States) Ryan Sweeting (quarterfinals)

== Draw ==
=== Key ===
- Q = Qualifier
- WC = Wild card
- LL = Lucky loser
- Alt = Alternate
- SE = Special exempt
- PR = Protected ranking
- ITF = ITF entry
- JE = Junior exempt
- w/o = Walkover
- r = Retired
- d = Defaulted
- SR = Special ranking

=== Finals ===
Semifinals
1	(United States) Michael Russell	7^{7}	3
(United States) Donald Young	6^{3}	0^{r}
(Slovenia) Grega Žemlja	6	6
5	(South Africa) Kevin Anderson	4	4

Final
1	(United States) Michael Russell	6	6
(Slovenia) Grega Žemlja	0	3

=== Top half ===
First round
1	(United States) M Russell	6	4	6
(United States) R DeHeart	4	6	4
(Netherlands) I Sijsling	4	6	2
(Croatia) R Karanušić	6	3	6
(South Korea) KT Im	6	3	4
(Canada) P Polansky	1	6	6
WC	(United States) M McClune	2	6	3
8	(United States) R Sweeting	6	3	6
4	(United States) R Kendrick	3	7^{7}	7^{7}
(United States) A Bogomolov Jr.	6	6^{4}	6^{2}
Q	(United States) J-M Gambill	3	3
(Germany) A Begemann	6	6
(United States) D Young	6	4	6
LL	(United States) T Smyczek	2	6	2
Q	(Bulgaria) G Dimitrov	6	7^{7}
6	(United States) M Yani	2	6^{3}

Second round
1	(United States) M Russell	6	6
(Croatia) R Karanušić	1	0
(Canada) P Polansky	4	2
8	(United States) R Sweeting	6	6
4	(United States) R Kendrick	7	6
(Germany) A Begemann	5	1
(United States) D Young	6	7^{7}
Q	(Bulgaria) G Dimitrov	4	6^{2}

Quarterfinals
1	(United States) M Russell	4	7	6
8	(United States) R Sweeting	6	5	3
4	(United States) R Kendrick	6^{5}	4
(United States) D Young	7^{7}	6

Semifinals
1	(United States) M Russell	7^{7}	3
(United States) D Young	6^{3}	0^{r}

=== Bottom half ===
First round
7	(United States) J Witten	3	6	6^{5}
(Japan) G Soeda	6	4	7^{7}
(Italy) A Stoppini	2	2
(Slovenia) G Žemlja	6	6
(United States) L Cook	6	3	6
LL	(New Zealand) D King-Turner	4	6	3
Q	(Chinese Taipei) T-h Yang	6^{5}	6	7^{8}
3	(United States) J Levine	7^{7}	2	6^{6}
5	(South Africa) K Anderson	6^{3}	6	6
(Italy) M Crugnola	7^{7}	2	4
Q	(Croatia) N Mektić	6	0^{r}
(France) J Dasnières de Veigy	3	0
WC	(Germany) H Bode	4	6^{3}
WC	(United States) L Rosenberg	6	7^{7}
(Japan) T Ito	4	6	6^{5}
2	(United States) K Kim	6	4	7^{7}

Second round
(Japan) G Soeda	2	4
(Slovenia) G Žemlja	6	6
(United States) L Cook	6	6
Q	(Chinese Taipei) T-h Yang	2	4
5	(South Africa) K Anderson	6	6
Q	(Croatia) N Mektić	3	4
WC	(United States) L Rosenberg	2	4
2	(United States) K Kim	6	6

Quarterfinals
(Slovenia) G Žemlja	7	6
(United States) L Cook	5	1
5	(South Africa) K Anderson	4	6	6
2	(United States) K Kim	6	3	0

Semifinals
(Slovenia) G Žemlja	6	6
5	(South Africa) K Anderson	4	4
