= 2016 Tennis Championships of Maui – Men's singles =

Men's singles
- 2016 Tennis Championships of Maui

Final
- Champion: (China) Wu Di
- Runner-up: (United Kingdom) Kyle Edmund
- Score: 4–6, 6–3, 6–4

Events
Singles	men	women
Doubles	men	women
← 2015 ·	Tennis Championships of Maui	· 2017 →

Jared Donaldson was the defending champion, but he lost in the first round to Alex Bolt.

Wu Di won the title, defeating Kyle Edmund 4–6, 6–3, 6–4 in the final.

== Seeds ==
1. (United Kingdom) Kyle Edmund (final)
2. (Moldova) Radu Albot (first round)
3. (Australia) James Duckworth (semifinals, withdrew)
4. (United States) Bjorn Fratangelo (first round)
5. (United States) Ryan Harrison (first round)
6. (United States) Jared Donaldson (first round)
7. (Slovenia) Blaž Rola (first round)
8. (United States) Dennis Novikov (second round)

== Draw ==
=== Key ===
- Q = Qualifier
- WC = Wild card
- LL = Lucky loser
- Alt = Alternate
- SE = Special exempt
- PR = Protected ranking
- ITF = ITF entry
- JE = Junior exempt
- w/o = Walkover
- r = Retired
- d = Defaulted
- SR = Special ranking

=== Finals ===
Semifinals
1	(United Kingdom) Kyle Edmund	w/o
3	(Australia) James Duckworth
WC	(United States) Noah Rubin	7^{7}	1	2
(China) Wu Di	6^{2}	6	6

Final
1	(United Kingdom) Kyle Edmund	6	3	4
(China) Wu Di	4	6	6

=== Top half ===
First round
1	(United Kingdom) K Edmund	6	6
(United States) A Sarkissian	4	2
Q	(United States) M Mmoh	6	6
WC	(Spain) Jaume Martinez Vich	3	1
WC	(United States) S Kozlov	3	1
Q	(United States) N Meister	6	6
(Republic of Ireland) J McGee	7	6
5	(United States) R Harrison	5	3
3	(Australia) J Duckworth	6	7^{7}
(Kazakhstan) A Golubev	3	6^{3}
(Ukraine) D Molchanov	2	4
(United States) T Fritz	6	6
(Slovenia) G Žemlja	6	2	4
(United States) F Tiafoe	4	6	6
(Switzerland) H Laaksonen	6^{6}	3
8	(United States) D Novikov	7^{8}	6

Second round
1	(United Kingdom) K Edmund	6	6
Q	(United States) M Mmoh	1	0
Q	(United States) N Meister	4	6	6
(Republic of Ireland) J McGee	6	3	1
3	(Australia) J Duckworth	6	7^{7}
(United States) T Fritz	3	6^{5}
(United States) F Tiafoe	6^{5}	6	6
8	(United States) D Novikov	7^{7}	4	3

Quarterfinals
1	(United Kingdom) K Edmund	6	6
Q	(United States) N Meister	2	3
3	(Australia) J Duckworth	7^{7}	6
(United States) F Tiafoe	6^{4}	3

Semifinals
1	(United Kingdom) K Edmund	w/o
3	(Australia) J Duckworth

=== Bottom half ===
First round
7	(Slovenia) B Rola	5	6^{2}
Q	(United States) E Escobedo	7	7^{7}
(China) Z Li	4	0
(United States) T Sandgren	6	6
WC	(France) Thibaud Berland	4	6	4
WC	(United States) N Rubin	6	2	6
(United States) M Krueger	7	6
4	(United States) B Fratangelo	5	4
6	(United States) J Donaldson	7^{7}	6^{5}	3
LL	(Australia) A Bolt	6^{4}	7^{7}	6
Q	(United States) E Quigley	2	5
(Chinese Taipei) J Jung	6	7
(China) D Wu	6	7
(United States) Connor Smith	2	5
(Italy) M Donati	6	6
2	(Moldova) R Albot	4	4

Second round
Q	(United States) E Escobedo	6	6
(United States) T Sandgren	2	2
WC	(United States) N Rubin	4	6	6
(United States) M Krueger	6	1	1
LL	(Australia) A Bolt	7^{7}	4	6
(Chinese Taipei) J Jung	6^{4}	6	2
(China) D Wu	6	1
(Italy) M Donati	1	0^{r}

Quarterfinals
Q	(United States) E Escobedo	4	6	2
WC	(United States) N Rubin	6	4	6
LL	(Australia) A Bolt	7	4	4
(China) D Wu	5	6	6

Semifinals
WC	(United States) N Rubin	7^{7}	1	2
(China) D Wu	6^{2}	6	6
