= 2016 Tennis Championships of Maui – Men's doubles =

Men's doubles
- 2016 Tennis Championships of Maui

Final
- Champions: (Chinese Taipei) Jason Jung (United States) Dennis Novikov
- Runners-up: (Australia) Alex Bolt (Germany) Frank Moser
- Score: 6–3, 4–6, [10–8]

Events
Singles	men	women
Doubles	men	women
← 2015 ·	Tennis Championships of Maui	· 2017 →

Jared Donaldson and Stefan Kozlov are the defending champions but only Kozlov defending his title partnering Taylor Fritz, losing in the first round to Toshihide Matsui and Dean O'Brien.

Jason Jung and Dennis Novikov won the title, defeating Alex Bolt and Frank Moser in the final 6–3, 4–6, [10–8].

== Seeds ==
1. (Moldova) Radu Albot / (Ukraine) Denys Molchanov (first round)
2. (Australia) Alex Bolt / (Germany) Frank Moser (final)
3. (China) Gong Maoxin / (Chinese Taipei) Peng Hsien-yin (quarterfinals)
4. (Japan) Toshihide Matsui / (South Africa) Dean O'Brien (quarterfinals)

== Draw ==
=== Key ===
- Q = Qualifier
- WC = Wild card
- LL = Lucky loser
- Alt = Alternate
- SE = Special exempt
- PR = Protected ranking
- ITF = ITF entry
- JE = Junior exempt
- w/o = Walkover
- r = Retired
- d = Defaulted
- SR = Special ranking

First round
1	(Moldova) R Albot (Ukraine) D Molchanov	4	6	[8]
(United States) M Krueger (Switzerland) H Laaksonen	6	4	[10]
(Philippines) R Gonzales (United Kingdom) D Walsh	6^{4}	6^{5}
(Chinese Taipei) J Jung (United States) D Novikov	7^{7}	7^{7}
3	(China) M Gong (Chinese Taipei) H-y Peng	4	7	[11]
WC	(United States) Gonzales Austin (United States) Connor Smith	6	5	[9]
(United States) J Cerretani (United States) M Schnur	6	7^{7}
(Slovenia) B Rola (Slovenia) G Žemlja	4	6^{3}
WC	(United States) N Meister (United States) E Quigley	6	5	[8]
(Canada) P Bester (Canada) P Polansky	1	7	[10]
(United States) T Fritz (United States) S Kozlov	7^{7}	6^{6}	[6]
4	(Japan) T Matsui (South Africa) D O'Brien	6^{4}	7^{8}	[10]
(Italy) M Donati (Kazakhstan) A Golubev	3	2
(China) Z Li (China) D Wu	6	6
WC	(Germany) Hendrik Bode (Bulgaria) Nikola Petrov	4	3
2	(Australia) A Bolt (Germany) F Moser	6	6

Quarterfinals
(United States) M Krueger (Switzerland) H Laaksonen
(Chinese Taipei) J Jung (United States) D Novikov	w/o
3	(China) M Gong (Chinese Taipei) H-y Peng	3	5
(United States) J Cerretani (United States) M Schnur	6	7
(Canada) P Bester (Canada) P Polansky	2	6	[10]
4	(Japan) T Matsui (South Africa) D O'Brien	6	3	[3]
(China) Z Li (China) D Wu	3	5
2	(Australia) A Bolt (Germany) F Moser	6	7

Semifinals
(Chinese Taipei) J Jung (United States) D Novikov	6	1	[10]
(United States) J Cerretani (United States) M Schnur	4	6	[8]
(Canada) P Bester (Canada) P Polansky	7^{7}	4	[6]
2	(Australia) A Bolt (Germany) F Moser	6^{5}	6	[10]

Final
(Chinese Taipei) J Jung (United States) D Novikov	6	4	[10]
2	(Australia) A Bolt (Germany) F Moser	3	6	[8]
