= 2014 Royal Lahaina Challenger =

- Date: 20–26 January
- Edition: 5th
- Draw: 32S / 16D
- Prize money: $50,000
- Surface: Hard
- Location: Maui, United States

Champions

Singles
- (United States) Bradley Klahn

Doubles
- (United States) Denis Kudla / (Japan) Yasutaka Uchiyama
← 2013 ·	Royal Lahaina Challenger	· 2015 →

The 2014 Royal Lahaina Challenger was a professional tennis tournament played on hard courts. It was the fifth edition of the tournament which was part of the 2014 ATP Challenger Tour. It took place in Maui, United States between 20 and 26 January 2014.

== Singles main-draw entrants ==
=== Seeds ===
Country	Player	Rank^{1}	Seed
~~RUS~~	~~Alex Bogomolov Jr.~~	89	1
USA	Tim Smyczek	90	2
USA	Bradley Klahn	93	3
USA	Jack Sock	95	4
USA	Ryan Harrison	110	5
USA	Denis Kudla	113	6
CAN	Frank Dancevic	122	7
USA	Wayne Odesnik	139	8
USA	Alex Kuznetsov	140	9

- ^{1} Rankings are as of January 13, 2014.

=== Other entrants ===
The following players received wildcards into the singles main draw:

- (France) Thibaud Berland
- (Czech Republic) Petr Michnev
- (United States) Marcos Giron
- (United States) Mitchell Krueger

The following players received entry from the qualifying draw:

- (United States) Jared Donaldson
- (Tunisia) Malek Jaziri
- (United States) Daniel Kosakowski
- (Chinese Taipei) Wang Chieh-Fu

The following players received entry as a lucky loser:

- (United States) Jarmere Jenkins
- (Japan) Kento Takeuchi

== Champions ==
=== Singles ===
- (United States) Bradley Klahn def. (Chinese Taipei) Yang Tsung-hua, 6–2, 6–3

=== Doubles ===
- (United States) Denis Kudla / (Japan) Yasutaka Uchiyama def. (United States) Daniel Kosakowski / (United States) Nicolas Meister, 6–3, 6–2
