= 2016 Tennis Championships of Maui – Women's singles =

Women's singles
- 2016 Tennis Championships of Maui

Final
- Champion: (United States) Christina McHale
- Runner-up: (United States) Raveena Kingsley
- Score: 6–3, 4–6, 6–4

Events
| Singles | men | women |
| Doubles | men | women |
| ← 2015 · | Tennis Championships of Maui | · 2017 → |

This was a new event added to the ITF Women's Circuit in 2016.

Christina McHale won the title, defeating Raveena Kingsley in an all-American final, 6–3, 4–6, 6–4.

== Seeds ==
1. (United States) Christina McHale (champion)
2. (United States) Samantha Crawford (quarterfinals)
3. (United Kingdom) Naomi Broady (semifinals)
4. (United States) Sachia Vickery (second round)
5. (United States) Jessica Pegula (semifinals)
6. (Poland) Paula Kania (quarterfinals)
7. (Belgium) Ysaline Bonaventure (first round; defaulted)
8. (Japan) Miyu Kato (second round)

== Main draw ==
=== Key ===
- Q = Qualifier
- WC = Wild card
- LL = Lucky loser
- Alt = Alternate
- SE = Special exempt
- PR = Protected ranking
- ITF = ITF entry
- JE = Junior exempt
- w/o = Walkover
- r = Retired
- d = Defaulted
- SR = Special ranking

=== Finals ===
Semifinals
1 | (United States) Christina McHale | 3 | 7^{7} | 6
3 | (United Kingdom) Naomi Broady | 6 | 6^{5} | 4
5 | (United States) Jessica Pegula | 6 | 2 | 6^{5}
(United States) Raveena Kingsley | 2 | 6 | 7^{7}

Final
1 | (United States) Christina McHale | 6 | 4 | 6
(United States) Raveena Kingsley | 3 | 6 | 4

=== Top half ===
First round
1/WC | (United States) C McHale | 6 | 7^{7}
(Czech Republic) N Vaidišová | 0 | 6^{5}
(United States) S Santamaria | 4 | 7 | 4
(United States) D Lao | 6 | 5 | 6
(Chinese Taipei) C-w Hsu | 6 | 6
(United States) C Liu | 1 | 2
WC | (United States) M Gordon | 3 | 3
6 | (Poland) P Kania | 6 | 6
3 | (United Kingdom) N Broady | 7^{7} | 6
(Ukraine) L Kichenok | 6^{4} | 4
WC | (China) N Zhang | 2 | 6^{4}
Q | (Poland) M Linette | 6 | 7^{7}
(Finland) P Suomalainen | 4 | 2
Q | (Russia) E Levashova | 6 | 6
(United States) J Cako | 2
7 | (Belgium) Y Bonaventure | 0^{d}

Second round
1/WC | (United States) C McHale | 6 | 6
(United States) D Lao | 1 | 2
(Chinese Taipei) C-w Hsu | 1 | 2
6 | (Poland) P Kania | 6 | 6
3 | (United Kingdom) N Broady | 3 | 6 | 6
Q | (Poland) M Linette | 6 | 4 | 3
Q | (Russia) E Levashova | 4 | 2
(United States) J Cako | 6 | 6

Quarterfinals
1/WC | (United States) C McHale | 6 | 6
6 | (Poland) P Kania | 2 | 1
3 | (United Kingdom) N Broady | 3 | 6 | 6
(United States) J Cako | 6 | 3 | 3

Semifinals
1/WC | (United States) C McHale | 3 | 7^{7} | 6
3 | (United Kingdom) N Broady | 6 | 6^{5} | 4

=== Bottom half ===
First round
5 | (United States) J Pegula | 6 | 6
(United States) J Wacnik | 1 | 3
Q | (United States) A Kratzer | 6 | 7^{9}
Q | (Japan) R Ushijima | 4 | 6^{7}
(Japan) A Okuno | 5 | 2
(United States) M Sanchez | 7 | 6
(United States) A Muhammad | 3 | 0
4 | (United States) S Vickery | 6 | 6
8 | (Japan) M Kato | 6 | 6
(Hong Kong) L Zhang | 4 | 3
(United States) J Boserup | 2 | 0
(United States) R Kingsley | 6 | 6
(United States) T Townsend | 6 | 6
(Japan) M Hibi | 4 | 3
(United States) J Brady | 1 | 7^{9} | 2
2 | (United States) S Crawford | 6 | 6^{7} | 6

Second round
5 | (United States) J Pegula | 6 | 6
Q | (United States) A Kratzer | 4 | 3
(United States) M Sanchez | 6 | 7
4 | (United States) S Vickery | 4 | 5
8 | (Japan) M Kato | 0 | 2
(United States) R Kingsley | 6 | 6
(United States) T Townsend | 3 | 6 | 1
2 | (United States) S Crawford | 6 | 3 | 6

Quarterfinals
5 | (United States) J Pegula | 6 | 2 | 6
(United States) M Sanchez | 1 | 6 | 4
(United States) R Kingsley | 6 | 4 | 6
2 | (United States) S Crawford | 3 | 6 | 2

Semifinals
5 | (United States) J Pegula | 6 | 2 | 6^{5}
(United States) R Kingsley | 2 | 6 | 7^{7}
