= 2011 Honolulu Challenger – Singles =

Singles
- 2011 Honolulu Challenger

Final
- Champion: (United States) Ryan Harrison
- Runner-up: (United States) Alex Kuznetsov
- Score: 6–4, 3–6, 6–4

Events
Singles	Doubles
← 2010 ·	Honolulu Challenger	· 2012 →

Michael Russell was the defending champion, but lost to Ryan Harrison in the semifinals.
Harrison went on to win the title after defeating Alex Kuznetsov 6–4, 3–6, 6–4 in the final.

== Seeds ==
1. (United States) Michael Russell (semifinals)
2. (United States) Robert Kendrick (quarterfinals)
3. (United States) Ryan Sweeting (quarterfinals)
4. (Slovenia) Grega Žemlja (first round)
5. (United States) Bobby Reynolds (quarterfinals)
6. (United States) Ryan Harrison (champion)
7. (United States) Tim Smyczek (second round)
8. (United States) Jesse Witten (semifinals)

== Draw ==
=== Key ===
- Q = Qualifier
- WC = Wild card
- LL = Lucky loser
- Alt = Alternate
- ITF = ITF entry
- PR = Protected ranking
- SR = Special ranking
- SE = Special exempt
- JE = Junior exempt
- JR = Junior Accelerator Programme entrant
- CO = College Accelerator Programme entrant
- NG = Next Gen Accelerator Program entrant
- w/o = Walkover
- r = Retired
- d = Defaulted

=== Finals ===
Semifinals
1	(United States) Michael Russell	6	3	3
6	(United States) Ryan Harrison	2	6	6
(United States) Alex Kuznetsov	4	6	6
8	(United States) Jesse Witten	6	1	4

Final
6	(United States) Ryan Harrison	6	3	6
(United States) Alex Kuznetsov	4	6	4

=== Top half ===
First round
1	(United States) M Russell	4	6	6
Q	(South Korea) W-s Jun	6	1	4
(United States) K Kim	2	6^{2}
(United States) N Monroe	6	7^{7}
(Canada) V Pospisil	6	6
Alt	(United States) G Ouellette	1	3
Q	(Slovenia) L Gregorc	3	2
7	(United States) T Smyczek	6	6
3	(United States) R Sweeting	7^{7}	6
Q	(Haiti) O Sajous	6^{2}	0
WC	(United States) D Britton	4	4
(Australia) G Jones	6	6
(United States) R DeHeart	6	7
WC	(France) Jérémy Tweedt	3	5
Q	(Chinese Taipei) T Chen	1	2
6	(United States) R Harrison	6	6

Second round
1	(United States) M Russell	6	6
(United States) N Monroe	0	2
(Canada) V Pospisil	6	6
7	(United States) T Smyczek	1	2
3	(United States) R Sweeting	6	5	7
(Australia) G Jones	4	7	5
(United States) R DeHeart	3	0
6	(United States) R Harrison	6	6

Quarterfinals
1	(United States) M Russell	6	7^{7}
(Canada) V Pospisil	4	6^{3}
3	(United States) R Sweeting	6^{4}	4
6	(United States) R Harrison	7^{7}	6

Semifinals
1	(United States) M Russell	6	3	3
6	(United States) R Harrison	2	6	6

=== Bottom half ===
First round
5	(United States) B Reynolds	3	6	6
(Australia) S Groth	6	3	3
WC	(United States) A Krajicek	6	6
(New Zealand) M Venus	4	1
(United States) A Kuznetsov	7^{7}	7^{7}
(United States) M McClune	6^{2}	6^{3}
(Canada) P Bester	7	6
4	(Slovenia) G Žemlja	5	1
8	(United States) J Witten	6	6
(South Korea) D Yoo	3	2
(Spain) Pablo Martín-Adalia	4	4
WC	(United States) D Lajola	6	6
(United States) R Borvanov	6	6
(Australia) M Reid	3	2
(Japan) H Kondo	1	0
2	(United States) R Kendrick	6	6

Second round
5	(United States) B Reynolds	6	6
WC	(United States) A Krajicek	4	2
(United States) A Kuznetsov	4	6	6
(Canada) P Bester	6	4	4
8	(United States) J Witten	5	6	7^{7}
WC	(United States) D Lajola	7	4	6^{5}
(United States) R Borvanov	4	4
2	(United States) R Kendrick	6	6

Quarterfinals
5	(United States) B Reynolds	3	6	6^{4}
(United States) A Kuznetsov	6	2	7^{7}
8	(United States) J Witten	7	3	6
2	(United States) R Kendrick	5	6	2

Semifinals
(United States) A Kuznetsov	4	6	6
8	(United States) J Witten	6	1	4
