= 2017 Tennis Championships of Maui – Singles =

Tennis contest held in Maui

Singles
- 2017 Tennis Championships of Maui

Final
- Champion: (South Korea) Chung Hyeon
- Runner-up: (Japan) Taro Daniel
- Score: 7–6^{(7–3)}, 6–1

Events
Singles	Doubles
- Tennis Championships of Maui

Wu Di was the defending champion but lost in the first round to Tommy Paul.

Chung Hyeon won the title after defeating Taro Daniel 7–6^{(7–3)}, 6–1 in the final.

== Seeds ==
1. (United States) Jared Donaldson (first round)
2. (South Korea) Chung Hyeon (champion)
3. (Japan) Yūichi Sugita (first round)
4. (Japan) Taro Daniel (final)
5. (Switzerland) Marco Chiudinelli (first round)
6. (United States) Ernesto Escobedo (first round)
7. (Switzerland) Henri Laaksonen (semifinals)
8. (Canada) Vasek Pospisil (first round)

== Draw ==
Key

- Q = Qualifier
- WC = Wild card
- LL = Lucky loser
- Alt = Alternate
- ITF = ITF entry
- PR = Protected ranking
- SR = Special ranking
- SE = Special exempt
- JE = Junior exempt
- JR = Junior Accelerator Programme entrant
- CO = College Accelerator Programme entrant
- NG = Next Gen Accelerator Program entrant
- w/o = Walkover
- r = Retired
- d = Defaulted

=== Finals ===
Semifinals
(United Kingdom) Cameron Norrie	4	4
4	(Japan) Taro Daniel	6	6
7	(Switzerland) Henri Laaksonen	1	3
2	(South Korea) Chung Hyeon	6	6

Final
4	(Japan) Taro Daniel	6^{3}	1
2	(South Korea) Chung Hyeon	7^{7}	6

=== Top half ===
First round
1	(United States) J Donaldson	7	5	5
(United States) A Sarkissian	5	7	7
WC	(United States) Andre Ilagan	1	0
Q	(China) Z Li	6	6
(United Kingdom) C Norrie	4	6	6
(Republic of Ireland) J McGee	6	3	4
(United States) A Krajicek	6	5	7^{7}
5	(Switzerland) M Chiudinelli	4	7	6^{5}
4	(Japan) T Daniel	6	6
Q	(Ecuador) R Quiroz	3	4
(United States) N Rubin	4	2
(China) Z Zhang	6	6
(Czech Republic) J Šátral	6	4	6^{2}
(United States) M Krueger	3	6	7^{7}
(Japan) G Soeda	6	6
6	(United States) E Escobedo	1	1

Second round
(United States) A Sarkissian	6	6
Q	(China) Z Li	4	4
(United Kingdom) C Norrie	6	6
(United States) A Krajicek	1	3
4	(Japan) T Daniel	6	4	6
(China) Z Zhang	3	6	2
(United States) M Krueger	6	3	6
(Japan) G Soeda	2	6	3

Quarterfinals
(United States) A Sarkissian	1	3
(United Kingdom) C Norrie	6	6
4	(Japan) T Daniel	6	6
(United States) M Krueger	3	1

Semifinals
(United Kingdom) C Norrie	4	4
4	(Japan) T Daniel	6	6

=== Bottom half ===
First round
7	(Switzerland) H Laaksonen	6	6
WC	(Czech Republic) Filip Doležel	2	0
(Canada) D Shapovalov	6^{5}	6	6^{4}
Q	(Japan) K Takeuchi	7^{7}	3	7^{7}
(Japan) T Ito	7	3	3
WC	(United States) B Klahn	5	6	6
(United States) T Sandgren	6	6
3	(Japan) Y Sugita	4	4
8	(Canada) V Pospisil	6	4	3
(United States) M Mmoh	3	6	6
(China) D Wu	2	3
(United States) T Paul	6	6
WC	(United States) M McDonald	6	6
Q	(Switzerland) A Bellier	2	4
(United States) D Novikov	3	2
2	(South Korea) H Chung	6	6

Second round
7	(Switzerland) H Laaksonen	6	6
Q	(Japan) K Takeuchi	2	2
WC	(United States) B Klahn	6	3	6^{9}
(United States) T Sandgren	3	6	7^{11}
(United States) M Mmoh	6	1	6
(United States) T Paul	1	6	2
WC	(United States) M McDonald	2	0
2	(South Korea) H Chung	6	6

Quarterfinals
7	(Switzerland) H Laaksonen	6	3	6
(United States) T Sandgren	4	6	2
(United States) M Mmoh	2	4
2	(South Korea) H Chung	6	6

Semifinals
7	(Switzerland) H Laaksonen	1	3
2	(South Korea) H Chung	6	6
