= 2014 Royal Lahaina Challenger – Doubles =

Doubles
- 2014 Royal Lahaina Challenger

Final
- Champions: (United States) Denis Kudla (Japan) Yasutaka Uchiyama
- Runners-up: (United States) Daniel Kosakowski (United States) Nicolas Meister
- Score: 6–3, 6–2

Events
Singles	Doubles
← 2013 ·	Royal Lahaina Challenger	· 2015 →

Lee Hsin-han and Peng Hsien-yin were the defending champions but decided not to participate.

Kudla and Uchiyama won the title, defeating Daniel Kosakowski and Nicolas Meister in the final, 6–3, 6–2.

== Seeds ==
1. (United States) Austin Krajicek / (United States) Tennys Sandgren (semifinals)
2. (United States) James Cerretani / (Canada) Adil Shamasdin (first round)
3. (United States) Steve Johnson / (United States) Tim Smyczek (first round)
4. (Chinese Taipei) Peng Hsien-yin / (Chinese Taipei) Yang Tsung-hua (first round)

== Draw ==
=== Key ===
- Q = Qualifier
- WC = Wild card
- LL = Lucky loser
- Alt = Alternate
- SE = Special exempt
- PR = Protected ranking
- ITF = ITF entry
- JE = Junior exempt
- w/o = Walkover
- r = Retired
- d = Defaulted
- SR = Special ranking

=== Draw ===
First round
1	(United States) A Krajicek (United States) T Sandgren	6	6
(Chinese Taipei) H-h Lee (Chinese Taipei) C-f Wang	2	4
WC	(United States) Andrew Carter (United States) A Halebian	4	3
LL	(Japan) T Suzuki (Japan) K Takeuchi	6	6
4	(Chinese Taipei) H-y Peng (Chinese Taipei) T-h Yang	6	4	[7]
(United States) D Kudla (Japan) Y Uchiyama	3	6	[10]
(Canada) F Dancevic (Canada) P Polansky	6	6
WC	(United States) Tyler Hochwalt (South Africa) A O'Brien	2	3
(United States) D Kosakowski (United States) N Meister	6	6
LL	(United States) Rick Kepler (China) Rong Ma	1	2
(Republic of Ireland) J McGee (Chinese Taipei) J Wang	6	7^{7}
3	(United States) S Johnson (United States) T Smyczek	3	6^{4}
WC	(Sweden) Mikael Maatta (Denmark) Jan Tribler	3	3
(United States) B Klahn (United States) M Krueger	6	6
Q	(France) Thibaud Berland (Czech Republic) Petr Michnev	7	3	[10]
2	(United States) J Cerretani (Canada) A Shamasdin	5	6	[6]

Quarterfinals
1	(United States) A Krajicek (United States) T Sandgren	6	5	[14]
LL	(Japan) T Suzuki (Japan) K Takeuchi	2	7	[12]
(United States) D Kudla (Japan) Y Uchiyama	6	4	[13]
(Canada) F Dancevic (Canada) P Polansky	2	6	[11]
(United States) D Kosakowski (United States) N Meister	6	7
(Republic of Ireland) J McGee (Chinese Taipei) J Wang	3	5
(United States) B Klahn (United States) M Krueger	4	6	[11]
Q	(France) T Berland (Czech Republic) P Michnev	6	3	[9]

Semifinals
1	(United States) A Krajicek (United States) T Sandgren	6	2	[9]
(United States) D Kudla (Japan) Y Uchiyama	3	6	[11]
(United States) D Kosakowski (United States) N Meister	w/o
(United States) B Klahn (United States) M Krueger

Final
(United States) D Kudla (Japan) Y Uchiyama	6	6
(United States) D Kosakowski (United States) N Meister	3	2
