= 2012 Honolulu Challenger =

- Date: 23–29 January
- Edition: 3rd
- Location: Honolulu, United States

Champions

Singles
- (Japan) Go Soeda

Doubles
- (Bosnia and Herzegovina) Amer Delić / (United States) Travis Rettenmaier
← 2011 ·	Honolulu Challenger	· 2013 →

The 2012 Honolulu Challenger was a professional tennis tournament played on hard courts. It was the third edition of the tournament which was part of the 2012 ATP Challenger Tour. It took place in Honolulu, United States between 23 and 29 January 2012.

== Singles main-draw entrants ==
=== Seeds ===
Country	Player	Rank^{1}	Seed
JPN	Go Soeda	99	1
USA	Bobby Reynolds	115	2
JPN	Tatsuma Ito	117	3
USA	Alex Kuznetsov	167	4
USA	Michael Yani	177	5
TPE	Yang Tsung-hua	178	6
JPN	Yūichi Sugita	209	7
BIH	Amer Delić	210	8

- Rankings are as of January 16, 2012.

=== Other entrants ===
The following players received wildcards into the singles main draw:

- (United States) Alex Kuznetsov
- (United States) Dennis Lajola
- (United States) Leo Rosenberg
- (United States) Jack Sock

The following player received entry as an alternate into the singles main draw:

- (United States) Blake Strode

The following players received entry from the qualifying draw:

- (Zimbabwe) Takanyi Garanganga
- (United States) Kevin Kim
- (United States) Michael McClune
- (Haiti) Olivier Sajous

== Champions ==
=== Singles ===
(Japan) Go Soeda def. (United States) Robby Ginepri, 6–3, 7–6^{(7–5)}

=== Doubles ===
(Bosnia and Herzegovina) Amer Delić / (United States) Travis Rettenmaier def. (United States) Nicholas Monroe / (United States) Jack Sock 6–4, 7–6^{(7–3)}
