= 2010 Honolulu Challenger – Doubles =

Doubles
- 2010 Honolulu Challenger

Final
- Champions: (South Africa) Kevin Anderson (United States) Ryler DeHeart
- Runners-up: (South Korea) Im Kyu-tae (Austria) Martin Slanar
- Score: 3–6, 7–6^{(7–2)}, [15–13]

Events
Singles	Doubles
Honolulu Challenger	· 2011 →

Kevin Anderson and Ryler DeHeart won in the final 3–6, 7–6^{(7–2)}, [15–13] against Im Kyu-tae and Martin Slanar.

== Seeds ==
1. (Philippines) Treat Conrad Huey / (India) Harsh Mankad (second round)
2. (United States) Scott Lipsky / (United States) Rylan Rizza (first round)
3. (United States) Lester Cook / (United States) David Martin (second round)
4. (Canada) Pierre-Ludovic Duclos / (Sweden) Andreas Siljeström (first round)

== Draw ==
=== Key ===
- Q = Qualifier
- WC = Wild card
- LL = Lucky loser
- Alt = Alternate
- SE = Special exempt
- PR = Protected ranking
- ITF = ITF entry
- JE = Junior exempt
- w/o = Walkover
- r = Retired
- d = Defaulted
- SR = Special ranking

=== Draw ===
First round
1	(Philippines) TC Huey (India) H Mankad	6	6
(Italy) M Crugnola (Italy) A Stoppini	2	2
(Croatia) R Karanušić (Slovenia) G Žemlja	6^{0}	1
(Japan) H Kondo (Japan) G Soeda	7^{7}	6
4	(Canada) P-L Duclos (Sweden) A Siljeström	2	3
(South Africa) K Anderson (United States) R DeHeart	6	6
(India) P Raja (Canada) A Shamasdin	6	7^{7}
WC	(United States) J-M Gambill (United States) M McClune	4	6^{3}
Q	(Chinese Taipei) S-H Lee (Chinese Taipei) T-h Yang	4	2
(South Korea) K-t Im (Austria) M Slanar	6	6
WC	(Switzerland) D Luedi (Bulgaria) A Markov	1	1
3	(United States) L Cook (United States) D Martin	6	6
(United States) J Levine (United States) R Sweeting	6	6
WC	(United States) B Battistone (United States) D Battistone	3	2
(United States) A Bogomolov Jr. (United States) R Kendrick	7	6^{5}	[10]
2	(United States) S Lipsky (United States) R Rizza	5	7^{7}	[3]

Quarterfinals
1	(Philippines) TC Huey (India) H Mankad	4	6	[6]
(Japan) H Kondo (Japan) G Soeda	6	2	[10]
(South Africa) K Anderson (United States) R DeHeart	6	6
(India) P Raja (Canada) A Shamasdin	2	2
(South Korea) K-t Im (Austria) M Slanar	7^{8}	6
3	(United States) L Cook (United States) D Martin	6^{6}	3
(United States) J Levine (United States) R Sweeting	7	6
(United States) A Bogomolov Jr. (United States) R Kendrick	5	4

Semifinals
(Japan) H Kondo (Japan) G Soeda	2	1
(South Africa) K Anderson (United States) R DeHeart	6	6
(South Korea) K-t Im (Austria) M Slanar	6	6
(United States) J Levine (United States) R Sweeting	1	1

Final
(South Africa) K Anderson (United States) R DeHeart	3	7^{7}	[15]
(South Korea) K-t Im (Austria) M Slanar	6	6^{2}	[13]
