= 2016 Tennis Championships of Maui =

- Date: 25–31 January
- Edition: 7th (ATP); 1st (ITF)
- Category: ATP Challenger Tour; ITF Women's Circuit
- Prize money: $50,000 (ATP) $50,000 (ITF)
- Surface: Hard
- Location: Lahaina, Maui, United States

Champions

Men's singles
- (China) Wu Di

Women's singles
- (United States) Christina McHale

Men's doubles
- (Chinese Taipei) Jason Jung / (United States) Dennis Novikov

Women's doubles
- (United States) Asia Muhammad / (United States) Maria Sanchez
← 2015 ·	Tennis Championships of Maui	· 2017 →

The 2016 Tennis Championships of Maui was a professional tennis tournament played on outdoor hard courts. It was the seventh (ATP) and first (ITF) editions of the tournament and part of the 2016 ATP Challenger Tour and the 2016 ITF Women's Circuit, offering a total of $50,000 in prize money for both genders. It took place in Lahaina, Maui, United States, on 25–31 January 2016.

== ATP singles main draw entrants ==
=== Seeds ===
Country	Player	Rank^{1}	Seed
GBR	Kyle Edmund	88	1
MDA	Radu Albot	122	2
AUS	James Duckworth	129	3
USA	Bjorn Fratangelo	132	4
USA	Ryan Harrison	134	5
USA	Jared Donaldson	136	6
SLO	Blaž Rola	146	7
USA	Dennis Novikov	153	8

- ^{1} Rankings as of 18 January 2016.

=== Other entrants ===
The following players received wildcards into the singles main draw:

- (France) Thibaud Berland
- (United States) Stefan Kozlov
- (Spain) Jaume Martinez Vich
- (United States) Noah Rubin

The following player received entry as a lucky loser:

- (Australia) Alex Bolt

The following players received entry from the qualifying draw:

- (United States) Ernesto Escobedo
- (United States) Nicolas Meister
- (United States) Michael Mmoh
- (United States) Eric Quigley

== ITF singles main draw entrants ==
=== Seeds ===
Country	Player	Rank^{1}	Seed
USA	Christina McHale	65	1
USA	Samantha Crawford	107	2
GBR	Naomi Broady	111	3
USA	Sachia Vickery	128	4
USA	Jessica Pegula	156	5
POL	Paula Kania	159	6
BEL	Ysaline Bonaventure	165	7
JPN	Miyu Kato	184	8

- ^{1} Rankings as of 18 January 2016.

=== Other entrants ===
The following players received wildcards into the singles main draw:

- (United States) Michaela Gordon
- (United States) Christina McHale
- (China) Zhang Nannan

The following players received entry from the qualifying draw:

- (United States) Ashley Kratzer
- (Russia) Evgeniya Levashova
- (Poland) Magda Linette
- (Japan) Risa Ushijima

== Champions ==
=== Men's singles ===
- (China) Wu Di def. (United Kingdom) Kyle Edmund 4–6, 6–3, 6–4

=== Women's singles ===
- (United States) Christina McHale def. (United States) Raveena Kingsley 6–3, 4–6, 6–4

=== Men's doubles ===
- (Chinese Taipei) Jason Jung / (United States) Dennis Novikov def. (Australia) Alex Bolt / (Germany) Frank Moser 6–3, 4–6, [10–8]

=== Women's doubles ===
- (United States) Asia Muhammad / (United States) Maria Sanchez def. (United States) Jessica Pegula / (United States) Taylor Townsend 6–2, 3–6, [10–6]
