= 2011 Honolulu Challenger – Doubles =

Doubles
- 2011 Honolulu Challenger

Final
- Champions: (United States) Ryan Harrison (United States) Travis Rettenmaier
- Runners-up: (United States) Robert Kendrick (United States) Alex Kuznetsov
- Score: walkover

Events
Singles	Doubles
← 2010 ·	Honolulu Challenger	· 2012 →

Kevin Anderson and Ryler DeHeart were the defending champions but decided not to participate.
Ryan Harrison and Travis Rettenmaier won the final against Robert Kendrick and Alex Kuznetsov who withdrew before the match.

== Seeds ==
1. (United States) Ryan Harrison / (United States) Travis Rettenmaier (champions)
2. (United States) Robert Kendrick / (United States) Alex Kuznetsov (final, withdrew)
3. (United States) Brett Joelson / (United States) Nicholas Monroe (second round)
4. (Australia) Samuel Groth / (Australia) Greg Jones (semifinals)

== Draw ==
=== Key ===
- Q = Qualifier
- WC = Wild card
- LL = Lucky loser
- Alt = Alternate
- SE = Special exempt
- PR = Protected ranking
- ITF = ITF entry
- JE = Junior exempt
- w/o = Walkover
- r = Retired
- d = Defaulted
- SR = Special ranking

=== Draw ===
First round
1	(United States) R Harrison (United States) T Rettenmaier	4	6	[10]
(United States) M McClune (New Zealand) M Venus	6	3	[4]
(Chinese Taipei) T Chen (South Korea) W-s Jun	1	1
(United States) JP Fruttero (Germany) A Satschko	6	6
3	(United States) Brett Joelson (United States) N Monroe	6	6
(United States) R Borvanov (Japan) H Kondo	0	2
(Canada) P Bester (Canada) Kamil Pajkowski	6	6
WC	(China) Ma Rong (United States) Dillon Porter	4	2
(United States) T Parrott (United States) B Reynolds	6	6
(Ukraine) Ivan Anikanov (Haiti) O Sajous	1	1
(Slovenia) David Lenar (Slovenia) G Žemlja	6^{6}	3
4	(Australia) S Groth (Australia) G Jones	7^{8}	6
(Spain) Pablo Martín-Adalia (Australia) M Reid	6	7
WC	(Austria) Sebastian Bader (Czech Republic) Petr Michnev	3	5
(United States) K Kim (South Korea) D Yoo	3	2
2	(United States) R Kendrick (United States) A Kuznetsov	6	6

Quarterfinals
1	(United States) R Harrison (United States) T Rettenmaier	7^{7}	7^{7}
(United States) JP Fruttero (Germany) A Satschko	6^{2}	6^{3}
3	(United States) Brett Joelson (United States) N Monroe	3	7	[9]
(Canada) P Bester (Canada) Kamil Pajkowski	6	5	[11]
(United States) T Parrott (United States) B Reynolds	6	3	[8]
4	(Australia) S Groth (Australia) G Jones	3	6	[10]
(Spain) Pablo Martín-Adalia (Australia) M Reid	w/o
2	(United States) R Kendrick (United States) A Kuznetsov

Semifinals
1	(United States) R Harrison (United States) T Rettenmaier	6	6
(Canada) P Bester (Canada) Kamil Pajkowski	4	0
4	(Australia) S Groth (Australia) G Jones	2	3
2	(United States) R Kendrick (United States) A Kuznetsov	6	6

Final
1	(United States) R Harrison (United States) T Rettenmaier
2	(United States) R Kendrick (United States) A Kuznetsov	w/o
