= 2013 Maui Challenger =

- Date: 20–27 January
- Edition: 4th
- Draw: 32S / 16D
- Prize money: $50,000
- Surface: Hard
- Location: Maui, United States

Champions

Singles
- (Japan) Go Soeda

Doubles
- (Chinese Taipei) Lee Hsin-han / (Chinese Taipei) Peng Hsien-yin
← 2012 ·	Maui Challenger	· 2014 →

The 2013 Maui Challenger was a professional tennis tournament played on hard courts. It was the fourth edition of the tournament which was part of the 2013 ATP Challenger Tour. It took place in Maui, United States at the Wailea Tennis Club between 20 and 27 January 2013.

== Singles main-draw entrants ==
=== Seeds ===
Country	Player	Rank^{1}	Seed
JPN	Go Soeda	73	1
JPN	Tatsuma Ito	84	2
USA	Michael Russell	94	3
USA	Tim Smyczek	125	4
RUS	Alex Bogomolov Jr.	133	5
USA	Denis Kudla	136	6
BRA	Thiago Alves	145	7
USA	Ryan Sweeting	153	8

- ^{1} Rankings are as of 14 January 2013.

=== Other entrants ===
The following players received wildcards into the singles main draw:

- (United States) Devin Britton
- (United States) Dennis Lajola
- (China) Ma Rong
- (Czech Republic) Petr Michnev

The following players received entry from the qualifying draw:

- (South Africa) Jean Andersen
- (Australia) Carsten Ball
- (Japan) Takuto Niki
- (Japan) Hiroki Kondo

== Doubles main-draw entrants ==
=== Seeds ===
Country	Player	Country	Player	Rank^{1}	Seed
USA	Devin Britton	USA	Austin Krajicek	253	1
RUS	Alex Bogomolov Jr.	USA	Steve Johnson	266	2
TPE	Lee Hsin-han	TPE	Peng Hsien-yin	275	3
USA	Nicholas Monroe	USA	Donald Young	325	4

- ^{1} Rankings are as of 14 January 2013.

=== Other entrants ===
The following pairs received wildcards into the doubles main draw:

- (United States) Rick Kepler / (United States) Dennis Lajola
- (United States) Daniel Kosakowski / (United States) Michael McClune
- (Sweden) Mikael Maata / (Denmark) Jan Tribler

The following pairs received entry as a qualifier into the doubles main draw:

- (Czech Republic) Petr Michnev / (United States) Gerald Moretti

== Champions ==
=== Singles ===
- (Japan) Go Soeda def. (Germany) Mischa Zverev, 7–5, 7–5

=== Doubles ===
- (Chinese Taipei) Lee Hsin-han / (Chinese Taipei) Peng Hsien-yin def. (United States) Tennys Sandgren / (United States) Rhyne Williams, 6–7^{(1–7)}, 6–2, [10–5]
