= 2014 Royal Lahaina Challenger – Singles =

Singles
- 2014 Royal Lahaina Challenger

Final
- Champion: (United States) Bradley Klahn
- Runner-up: (Chinese Taipei) Yang Tsung-hua
- Score: 6–2, 6–3

Events
Singles	Doubles
← 2013 ·	Royal Lahaina Challenger	· 2015 →

Go Soeda was the two-time defending champion but chose not to compete.

Klahn won the title, defeating Yang Tsung-hua in the final, 6–2, 6–3.

== Seeds ==
1. (Russia) Alex Bogomolov Jr. (withdrew due to a bicep injury)
2. (United States) Tim Smyczek (semifinal)
3. (United States) Bradley Klahn (champion)
4. (United States) Jack Sock (first round, retired)
5. (United States) Ryan Harrison (first round)
6. (United States) Denis Kudla (second round)
7. (Canada) Frank Dancevic (second round)
8. (United States) Wayne Odesnik (first round)
9. (United States) Alex Kuznetsov (first round)

== Draw ==
=== Key ===
- Q = Qualifier
- WC = Wild card
- LL = Lucky loser
- Alt = Alternate
- ITF = ITF entry
- PR = Protected ranking
- SR = Special ranking
- SE = Special exempt
- JE = Junior exempt
- JR = Junior Accelerator Programme entrant
- CO = College Accelerator Programme entrant
- NG = Next Gen Accelerator Program entrant
- w/o = Walkover
- r = Retired
- d = Defaulted

=== Finals ===
Semifinals
(Japan) Tatsuma Ito	2	1
3	(United States) Bradley Klahn	6	6
(Chinese Taipei) Yang Tsung-hua	7^{7}	6
2/Alt	(United States) Tim Smyczek	6^{5}	4

Final
3	(United States) Bradley Klahn	6	6
(Chinese Taipei) Yang Tsung-hua	2	3

=== Top half ===
First round
9	(United States) A Kuznetsov	4	1
WC	(France) Thibaud Berland	6	6
(Ukraine) D Molchanov	6	6
LL	(Japan) K Takeuchi	1	4
(Republic of Ireland) J McGee	6	4
(Japan) T Ito	7	6
(United Kingdom) J Ward	4	3
6	(United States) D Kudla	6	6
3	(United States) B Klahn	6	7^{7}
WC	(Czech Republic) Petr Michnev	3	6^{3}
Q	(United States) J Donaldson	6	3
WC	(United States) M Giron	7^{7}	6
WC	(United States) M Krueger	7^{7}	4	5
(Canada) P Polansky	6^{1}	6	7
(Germany) M Zverev	3	7^{7}	6
5	(United States) R Harrison	6	6^{2}	1

Second round
WC	(France) T Berland	2	2
(Ukraine) D Molchanov	6	6
(Japan) T Ito	3	7	6
6	(United States) D Kudla	6	5	4
3	(United States) B Klahn	7^{11}	6
WC	(United States) M Giron	6^{9}	0
(Canada) P Polansky	6	7^{7}
(Germany) M Zverev	4	6^{5}

Quarterfinals
(Ukraine) D Molchanov	6	3	6^{5}
(Japan) T Ito	4	6	7^{7}
3	(United States) B Klahn	6	6
(Canada) P Polansky	3	2

Semifinals
(Japan) T Ito	1	2
3	(United States) B Klahn	6	6

=== Bottom half ===
First round
7	(Canada) F Dancevic	7^{7}	6
(Japan) Y Uchiyama	6^{2}	0
Q	(United States) D Kosakowski	6	4	6^{5}
(Zimbabwe) T Garanganga	2	6	7^{7}
LL	(United States) J Jenkins	6	6
(Chinese Taipei) J Wang	3	2
(Chinese Taipei) T-h Yang	6	2
4	(United States) J Sock	4	1^{r}
8	(United States) W Odesnik	3	3
(United States) T Sandgren	6	6
Q	(Tunisia) M Jaziri	1	3
(United States) A Krajicek	6	6
(United States) S Johnson	7^{7}	2	6
Q	(Chinese Taipei) C-f Wang	6^{4}	6	1
(Japan) H Moriya	2	4
2/Alt	(United States) T Smyczek	6	6

Second round
7	(Canada) F Dancevic	5	3
(Zimbabwe) T Garanganga	7	6
LL	(United States) J Jenkins	6^{6}	2
(Chinese Taipei) T-h Yang	7^{8}	6
(United States) T Sandgren	6^{4}	4
(United States) A Krajicek	7^{7}	6
(United States) S Johnson	2	3
2/Alt	(United States) T Smyczek	6	6

Quarterfinals
(Zimbabwe) T Garanganga	6	3	4
(Chinese Taipei) T-h Yang	3	6	6
(United States) A Krajicek	3	4
2/Alt	(United States) T Smyczek	6	6

Semifinals
(Chinese Taipei) T-h Yang	7^{7}	6
2/Alt	(United States) T Smyczek	6^{5}	4
