= Leo Rosenberg =

German jurist

- Born: 7 January 1879; Fraustadt, Province of Posen, German Empire (Wschowa, Poland)
- Died: 18 December 1963 (aged 84); Munich, West Germany
- Education: University of Freiburg; Ludwig-Maximilians-Universität München (LMU); University of Breslau (Wroclaw)
- Occupation: jurist
- Spouse: Hedwig Peter
- Children: 2 sons, 2 daughters

Leo Rosenberg (7 January 1879 – 18 December 1963) was a German jurist, a professor in Göttingen, Giessen, and Leipzig. In 1934, he was barred as Jew but managed to survive Hitler's regime. After World War II he lectured at the Ludwig-Maximilians-Universität München (LMU) until his retirement in 1956. Rosenberg's two-volume manual on civil procedural law remains a standard reference.

== Biography ==
Rosenberg was born in Fraustadt, Province of Posen, German Empire (today Wschowa, Poland) to Michael Rosenberg, a cigar manufacturer, and Emma née Lichtenstein.

Rosenberg passed his Abitur in Fraustadt aged 17 after skipping one grade, he studied law at the University of Freiburg, the Ludwig-Maximilians-Universität München (LMU) and the University of Breslau (Wroclaw, Poland). He passed his first legal exam in 1899 and received his doctorate in 1900: his dissertation concerned the burden of proof in civil law ("Die Beweislast nach der Civilprozeßordnung und dem Bürgerlichen Gesetzbuch"). The work was subsequently reprinted in five editions and strongly influenced the modern German Civil procedure law. Rosenberg served his Referendary in Posen (Poznań) and passed his second legal exam in 1904, he habilitated in Göttingen in 1906.

In 1912 Rosenberg became an extraordinary professor at the University of Giessen (ordinary professor in 1916) and rector of the university in 1927/28. In 1932 Rosenberg moved to the University of Leipzig, but was dismissed in 1934 according to the Law for the Restoration of the Professional Civil Service for being Jewish. He managed to work for a lawyer at the Reichsgericht in Leipzig for another two years.

As a regular visitor to the Rosenberg home in Leipzig, Helmut Roloff, then a young law student, recalls Rosenberg's seeming stoicism in face of intensifying Nazi harassment. The experienced helped persuade Roloff to abandon law for a career in music where he might be less directly implicated in the crimes of the regime, and later to join the Schulze-Boyson/Harnack (Rote Kapelle) resistance group.

The Rosenberg's took refuge in Stiefenhofen, Allgäu were they eked out a precarious existence during the war years.

Rehabilitated at war's end, Rosenberg was appointed to a chair for civil law and civil procedural law at the Ludwig-Maximilians-Universität München (LMU) in 1946, teaching until his retirement in 1956. He played an important role, including as dean, in rebuilding the law school.

Rosenberg died in Munich on 18 December 1963.

== Family ==
Rosenberg was married to Hedwig Peter, daughter of Gustav Albert Peter, they had two sons and two daughters. One daughter died aged 19 in 1944. Two sisters of Rosenberg died in the Theresienstadt concentration camp.

== Publications ==
- Die Beweislast nach der Civilprozeßordnung und dem Bürgerlichen Gesetzbuch (5 editions published in 1900, 1923, 1953, 1956, 1963)
- Lehrbuch des deutschen Zivilprozeßrechts (9 editions published in 1927, 1929, 1931, 1949, 1951, 1954, 1956, 1960, 1961); continued as Rosenberg/Schwab/Gottwald: Zivilprozeßrecht, 18th ed. 2018

== Awards ==
- Member of the Instituto Español de Derecho Procesal (Spain, 1949)
- Member of the Bavarian Academy of Sciences and Humanities (1954)
- Dr. oec. publ. h. c. (Munich, 1959)
- Honorary senator of the University of Giessen (1959)
- Dr. iur. h. c. (University of Innsbruck 1963)
