= 2017 Tennis Championships of Maui =

- Date: 24–29 January
- Edition: 8th
- Category: ATP Challenger Tour
- Prize money: $50,000
- Surface: Hard; SportMaster Sport Surfaces
- Location: Lahaina, Maui, United States

Champions

Singles
- (South Korea) Chung Hyeon

Doubles
- (United States) Austin Krajicek / (United States) Jackson Withrow
← 2016 ·	Tennis Championships of Maui	· 2018 →

The 2017 Tennis Championships of Maui was a professional tennis tournament played on outdoor hard courts. It was the eighth edition of the tournament and part of the 2017 ATP Challenger Tour. It took place in Lahaina, Maui, United States between 24–29 January 2017.

== Singles main draw entrants ==
=== Seeds ===
Country	Player	Rank^{1}	Seed
USA	Jared Donaldson	101	1
KOR	Chung Hyeon	105	2
JPN	Yūichi Sugita	112	3
JPN	Taro Daniel	124	4
SUI	Marco Chiudinelli	128	5
USA	Ernesto Escobedo	131	6
SUI	Henri Laaksonen	133	7
CAN	Vasek Pospisil	135	8

- ^{1} Rankings as of 16 January 2017.

=== Other entrants ===
The following players received wildcards into the singles main draw:

- (Czech Republic) Filip Doležel
- (United States) Andre Ilagan
- (United States) Bradley Klahn
- (United States) Mackenzie McDonald

The following players received entry from the qualifying draw:

- (Switzerland) Antoine Bellier
- (China) Li Zhe
- (Ecuador) Roberto Quiroz
- (Japan) Kento Takeuchi

== Champions ==
=== Singles ===
- (South Korea) Chung Hyeon def. (Japan) Taro Daniel 7–6^{(7–3)}, 6–1.

=== Doubles ===
- (United States) Austin Krajicek / (United States) Jackson Withrow def. (United States) Bradley Klahn / (United States) Tennys Sandgren 6–4, 6–3.
