= Tennis Championships of Maui =

- 2017 Tennis Championships of Maui

Defunct tennis tournament
- Location: Lahaina, Maui, United States
- Venue: Royal Lahaina Tennis Ranch at the Royal Lahaina Resort
- Website: tennischampionshipsofmaui.com
ATP Tour
- Category: ATP Challenger Tour
- Draw: 32S/32Q/16D
- Prize money: $50,000

== History ==
The tournament was first held in 2010 as the Honolulu Challenger, an ATP Challenger Tour event played on outdoor hard courts in Honolulu, Hawaii.

In 2013, the event was moved to the island of Maui and rebranded as the Tennis Championships of Maui. Beginning in 2014, it was staged at the Royal Lahaina, Hawaii Tennis Ranch, part of the Royal Lahaina Resort in Lahaina, Hawaii.

In 2016, the tournament briefly expanded to include a women’s ITF $50,000 event, which was won by Christina McHale in singles and Asia Muhammad and Maria Sanchez (tennis) in doubles.

The men’s edition continued through 2017, after which it was discontinued.

== Tournament details ==
The event was classified as an ATP Challenger Tour tournament with a draw size of 32 singles, 32 qualifying, and 16 doubles teams. The surface was outdoor hard courts, and the prize money was US$50,000.

== Notable champions ==
- Go Soeda of Japan won the singles title twice (2011 and 2012), making him the only repeat champion in the event’s history.
- South Korean player Chung Hyeon won the 2017 singles title, shortly before reaching the semifinals of the 2018 Australian Open.

== Past finals ==
=== Men's singles ===
Year	Champion	Runner-up	Score
2010	(United States) Michael Russell	(Slovenia) Grega Žemlja	6–0, 6–3
2011	(United States) Ryan Harrison	(United States) Alex Kuznetsov	6–4, 3–6, 6–4
2012	(Japan) Go Soeda	(United States) Robby Ginepri	6–3, 7–6^{(7–5)}
2013	(Japan) Go Soeda (2)	(Germany) Mischa Zverev	7–5, 7–5
2014	(United States) Bradley Klahn	(Chinese Taipei) Yang Tsung-hua	6–2, 6–3
2015	(United States) Jared Donaldson	(United States) Nicolas Meister	6–1, 6–4
2016	(China) Wu Di	(United Kingdom) Kyle Edmund	4–6, 6–3, 6–4
2017	(South Korea) Chung Hyeon	(Japan) Taro Daniel	7–6^{(7–3)}, 6–1

=== Men's doubles ===
Year	Champions	Runners-up	Score
2010	(South Africa) Kevin Anderson (United States) Ryler DeHeart	(South Korea) Im Kyu-tae (Austria) Martin Slanar	3–6, 7–6^{(7–2)}, [15–13]
2011	(United States) Ryan Harrison (United States) Travis Rettenmaier	(United States) Robert Kendrick (United States) Alex Kuznetsov	Walkover
2012	(Bosnia and Herzegovina) Amer Delić (United States) Travis Rettenmaier (2)	(United States) Nicholas Monroe (United States) Jack Sock	6–4, 7–6^{(7–3)}
2013	(Chinese Taipei) Lee Hsin-han (Chinese Taipei) Peng Hsien-yin	(United States) Tennys Sandgren (United States) Rhyne Williams	6–7^{(1–7)}, 6–2, [10–5]
2014	(United States) Denis Kudla (Japan) Yasutaka Uchiyama	(United States) Daniel Kosakowski (United States) Nicolas Meister	6–3, 6–2
2015	(United States) Jared Donaldson (United States) Stefan Kozlov	(United States) Chase Buchanan (United States) Rhyne Williams	6–3, 6–4
2016	(Chinese Taipei) Jason Jung (United States) Dennis Novikov	(Australia) Alex Bolt (Germany) Frank Moser	6–3, 4–6, [10–8]
2017	(United States) Austin Krajicek (United States) Jackson Withrow	(United States) Bradley Klahn (United States) Tennys Sandgren	6–4, 6–3

=== Women's singles ===
Year	Champion	Runner-up	Score
2016	(United States) Christina McHale	(United States) Raveena Kingsley	6–3, 4–6, 6–4

=== Women's doubles ===
Year	Champion	Runner-up	Score
2016	(United States) Asia Muhammad (United States) Maria Sanchez	(United States) Jessica Pegula (United States) Taylor Townsend	6–2, 3–6, [10–6]
