= Dennis Lajola =

American tennis player

- Country (sports): United States
- Residence: `Aiea, Honolulu, Hawaii
- Born: December 2, 1989 (age 36) Philippines
- Height: 1.79 m (5 ft 10 in)
- Plays: Right-handed (two-handed backhand)
- Prize money: $17,466

Singles
- Career record: 0–1
- Highest ranking: No. 584 (May 21, 2012)
- Current ranking: No. 592 (July 16, 2012)

Doubles
- Career record: 0–0
- Highest ranking: No. 1078 (December 5, 2008)
- Current ranking: No. 1577 (July 16, 2012)
- Last updated on: July 16, 2012.

Dennis Lajola (born December 2, 1989) is an American professional tennis player.

He was born in the Philippines and currently makes his home in `Aiea, Honolulu, Hawaii.

== Education ==
He attended the University of Hawaiʻi and received the Western Athletic Conference (WAC) player of the year award in 2011, the first University of Hawaii student to receive that honor. He was on the all-WAC first team all four years at the university.

== Tennis career ==
Dennis has played mostly Futures and Challengers, reaching the quarter-, semi-, and finals of a number of events, won 2007 Oceanic Time Warner Cable Honolulu Futures tennis tournament at the University of Hawai'i courts. He qualified for the 2012 SAP Open in San Jose, California. He lost his first main-draw match to Bulgarian Dimitar Kutrovsky, another qualifier.

== Personal life ==
He has two older brothers, Derrick and Darryl, and an older sister, Tiffaney. Derrick is also a tennis player and is currently women's tennis assistant coach at the University of Hawaii.
