= 2021 Puerto Vallarta Open – Singles =

Singles
- 2021 Puerto Vallarta Open

Final
- Champion: (Germany) Daniel Altmaier
- Runner-up: (Chile) Alejandro Tabilo
- Score: 6–3, 3–6, 6–3

Events
| Singles | Doubles |
| ← 2019 · | Puerto Vallarta Open | · 2023 → |

Sebastian Ofner was the defending champion but chose not to defend his title.

Daniel Altmaier won the title after defeating Alejandro Tabilo 6–3, 3–6, 6–3 in the final.

== Seeds ==
1. (Uruguay) Pablo Cuevas (quarterfinals, retired)
2. (Germany) Daniel Altmaier (champion)
3. (Chile) Alejandro Tabilo (final)
4. (United States) Ernesto Escobedo (first round)
5. (United States) Michael Mmoh (semifinals)
6. (United States) Christian Harrison (second round)
7. (Chinese Taipei) Wu Tung-lin (second round)
8. (Japan) Tatsuma Ito (quarterfinals)

== Draw ==
=== Key ===
- Q = Qualifier
- WC = Wild card
- LL = Lucky loser
- Alt = Alternate
- SE = Special exempt
- PR = Protected ranking
- ITF = ITF entry
- JE = Junior exempt
- w/o = Walkover
- r = Retired
- d = Defaulted
- SR = Special ranking

=== Finals ===
Semifinals
(Japan) Yosuke Watanuki | 3 | 2
3 | (Chile) Alejandro Tabilo | 6 | 6
5 | (United States) Michael Mmoh | 4 | 2
2 | (Germany) Daniel Altmaier | 6 | 6

Final
3 | (Chile) Alejandro Tabilo | 3 | 6 | 3
2 | (Germany) Daniel Altmaier | 6 | 3 | 6

=== Top half ===
First round
1 | (Uruguay) P Cuevas | 7 | 6
(United States) A Kovacevic | 5 | 4
Alt | (Argentina) MF Descotte | 6^{2} | 7 | 6
WC | (Mexico) G López Villaseñor | 7^{7} | 5 | 0
(Japan) Yo Watanuki | 6 | 6
PR | (New Zealand) R Statham | 3 | 2
Q | (Canada) L Draxl | 3 | 1
7 | (Chinese Taipei) T-l Wu | 6 | 6
3 | (Chile) A Tabilo | 6 | 6
(Spain) A Menéndez Maceiras | 3 | 2
WC | (United States) Milledge Cossu | 1 | 3
(United States) D Young | 6 | 6
(United States) A Rybakov | 7 | 4^{r}
Q | (Mexico) A Hernández | 5 | 4
(Netherlands) G Brouwer | 2 | 6^{3}
8 | (Japan) T Ito | 6 | 7^{7}

Second round
1 | (Uruguay) P Cuevas | 7^{7} | 0
Alt | (Argentina) MF Descotte | 6^{3} | 0^{r}
(Japan) Yo Watanuki | 6^{5} | 7 | 6
7 | (Chinese Taipei) T-l Wu | 7^{7} | 5 | 3
3 | (Chile) A Tabilo | 6 | 6
(United States) D Young | 2 | 1
Q | (Mexico) A Hernández | 2 | 3
8 | (Japan) T Ito | 6 | 6

Quarterfinals
1 | (Uruguay) P Cuevas | 6 | 4 | 0^{r}
(Japan) Yo Watanuki | 4 | 6 | 2
3 | (Chile) A Tabilo | 6 | 6
8 | (Japan) T Ito | 2 | 2

Semifinals
(Japan) Yo Watanuki | 3 | 2
3 | (Chile) A Tabilo | 6 | 6

=== Bottom half ===
First round
5 | (United States) M Mmoh | 6 | 6
(United States) N Chappell | 2 | 3
WC | (China) J Shang | 6 | 6
Alt | (Uruguay) M Cuevas | 4 | 4
(Japan) K Uchida | 6 | 6
PR | (United States) A Sarkissian | 3 | 4
(Canada) A Galarneau | 7 | 6^{4} | 7
4 | (United States) E Escobedo | 5 | 7^{7} | 5
6 | (United States) C Harrison | 6 | 6
(Spain) R Ortega Olmedo | 4 | 0
Q | (United States) Christian Langmo | 7 | 4 | 5
(United States) Z Svajda | 5 | 6 | 7
Q | (United States) G Nanda | 6 | 6
(United States) JC Aragone | 2 | 0
(United States) Mi Redlicki | 6^{5} | 1
2 | (Germany) D Altmaier | 7^{7} | 6

Second round
5 | (United States) M Mmoh | 7 | 4 | 6
WC | (China) J Shang | 5 | 6 | 4
(Japan) K Uchida | 6 | 6
(Canada) A Galarneau | 4 | 2
6 | (United States) C Harrison | 1 | 6^{9}
(United States) Z Svajda | 6 | 7^{11}
Q | (United States) G Nanda | 3 | 3
2 | (Germany) D Altmaier | 6 | 6

Quarterfinals
5 | (United States) M Mmoh | 7^{9} | 6
(Japan) K Uchida | 6^{7} | 3
(United States) Z Svajda | 6 | 6^{8} | 3
2 | (Germany) D Altmaier | 4 | 7^{10} | 6

Semifinals
5 | (United States) M Mmoh | 4 | 2
2 | (Germany) D Altmaier | 6 | 6
