= 2021 Puerto Vallarta Open – Doubles =

Doubles
- 2021 Puerto Vallarta Open

Final
- Champions: (Netherlands) Gijs Brouwer (United States) Reese Stalder
- Runners-up: (Mexico) Hans Hach Verdugo (Mexico) Miguel Ángel Reyes-Varela
- Score: 6–4, 6–4

Events
Singles	Doubles
- Puerto Vallarta Open

Matt Reid and John-Patrick Smith were the defending champions but chose not to defend their title.

Gijs Brouwer and Reese Stalder won the title after defeating Hans Hach Verdugo and Miguel Ángel Reyes-Varela 6–4, 6–4 in the final.

== Seeds ==
1. (Mexico) Hans Hach Verdugo / (Mexico) Miguel Ángel Reyes-Varela (final)
2. (United States) Evan King / (United States) Hunter Reese (quarterfinals)
3. (United States) Christian Harrison / (United States) Dennis Novikov (quarterfinals)
4. (Spain) Adrián Menéndez Maceiras / (Spain) Roberto Ortega Olmedo (semifinals)

== Draw ==
Key

- Q = Qualifier
- WC = Wild card
- LL = Lucky loser
- Alt = Alternate
- ITF = ITF entry
- PR = Protected ranking
- SR = Special ranking
- SE = Special exempt
- JE = Junior exempt
- JR = Junior Accelerator Programme entrant
- CO = College Accelerator Programme entrant
- NG = Next Gen Accelerator Program entrant
- w/o = Walkover
- r = Retired
- d = Defaulted

First round
1	(Mexico) H Hach Verdugo (Mexico) MÁ Reyes-Varela	6	6
WC	(United States) Milledge Cossu (Uruguay) P Cuevas	4	0
(United States) A Kovacevic (South Africa) R Roelofse	6^{7}	6^{5}
(Mexico) L Patiño (Japan) K Uchida	7^{9}	7^{7}
4	(Spain) A Menéndez Maceiras (Spain) R Ortega Olmedo	3	6	[10]
WC	(Colombia) JS Gómez (Mexico) A Hernández	6	2	[2]
(Uruguay) M Cuevas (Argentina) MF Descotte	5	2
(Mexico) S González (Mexico) G López Villaseñor	7	6
(United States) G Nanda (United States) Mi Redlicki	7^{7}	4	[6]
(Netherlands) G Brouwer (United States) R Stalder	6^{2}	6	[10]
PR	(Spain) P Vives Marcos (Chinese Taipei) T-l Wu	6^{4}	4
3	(United States) C Harrison (United States) D Novikov	7^{7}	6
(Canada) L Draxl (Canada) A Galarneau	6	6
PR	(Serbia) P Krstin (New Zealand) R Statham	1	2
WC	(Spain) M Damas (Mexico) Samuel Sánchez	2	2
2	(United States) E King (United States) H Reese	6	6

Quarterfinals
1	(Mexico) H Hach Verdugo (Mexico) MÁ Reyes-Varela	6	6
(Mexico) L Patiño (Japan) K Uchida	2	4
4	(Spain) A Menéndez Maceiras (Spain) R Ortega Olmedo	7^{7}	1	[10]
(Mexico) S González (Mexico) G López Villaseñor	6^{3}	6	[5]
(Netherlands) G Brouwer (United States) R Stalder	6	6
3	(United States) C Harrison (United States) D Novikov	3	4
(Canada) L Draxl (Canada) A Galarneau	6	3	[10]
2	(United States) E King (United States) H Reese	3	6	[2]

Semifinals
1	(Mexico) H Hach Verdugo (Mexico) MÁ Reyes-Varela	7	6
4	(Spain) A Menéndez Maceiras (Spain) R Ortega Olmedo	5	1
(Netherlands) G Brouwer (United States) R Stalder	6	6
(Canada) L Draxl (Canada) A Galarneau	4	4

Final
1	(Mexico) H Hach Verdugo (Mexico) MÁ Reyes-Varela	4	4
(Netherlands) G Brouwer (United States) R Stalder	6	6
