= 2019 Puerto Vallarta Open – Doubles =

Doubles
- 2019 Puerto Vallarta Open

Final
- Champions: (Australia) Matt Reid (Australia) John-Patrick Smith
- Runners-up: (Ecuador) Gonzalo Escobar (Venezuela) Luis David Martínez
- Score: 7–6^{(12–10)}, 6–3

Events
Singles	Doubles
- Puerto Vallarta Open

Ante Pavić and Danilo Petrović were the defending champions but chose to defend their title with different partners. Pavić partnered Hans Hach Verdugo but lost in the quarterfinals to Gonzalo Escobar and Luis David Martínez. Petrović partnered Alex Hernández but lost in the quarterfinals to Matt Reid and John-Patrick Smith.

Reid and Smith won the title after defeating Escobar and Martínez 7–6^{(12–10)}, 6–3 in the final.

== Seeds ==
1. (El Salvador) Marcelo Arévalo / (Mexico) Miguel Ángel Reyes-Varela (semifinals)
2. (India) Jeevan Nedunchezhiyan / (India) Purav Raja (semifinals)
3. (Australia) Matt Reid / (Australia) John-Patrick Smith (champions)
4. (Mexico) Hans Hach Verdugo / (Croatia) Ante Pavić (quarterfinals)

== Draw ==
Key

- Q = Qualifier
- WC = Wild card
- LL = Lucky loser
- Alt = Alternate
- ITF = ITF entry
- PR = Protected ranking
- SR = Special ranking
- SE = Special exempt
- JE = Junior exempt
- JR = Junior Accelerator Programme entrant
- CO = College Accelerator Programme entrant
- NG = Next Gen Accelerator Program entrant
- w/o = Walkover
- r = Retired
- d = Defaulted

First round
1	(El Salvador) M Arévalo (Mexico) MÁ Reyes-Varela	6	6
(United Kingdom) S Clayton (Canada) A Shamasdin	2	3
WC	(Spain) C Gómez-Herrera (Mexico) G López Villaseñor	3	4
ITF	(Spain) A Artuñedo (France) Baptiste Crepatte	6	6
4	(Mexico) H Hach Verdugo (Croatia) A Pavić	6	7^{8}
(Uruguay) A Behar (Ecuador) R Quiroz	2	6^{6}
WC	(United States) E Escobedo (Mexico) L Patiño	4	6^{0}
(Ecuador) G Escobar (Venezuela) LD Martínez	6	7^{7}
ITF	(Argentina) MF Descotte (Tunisia) S Mansouri	1	4
WC	(Mexico) A Hernández (Serbia) D Petrović	6	6
(Switzerland) M-A Hüsler (Netherlands) S Verbeek	1	7^{7}	[9]
3	(Australia) M Reid (Australia) J-P Smith	6	6^{5}	[11]
(Austria) S Ofner (Egypt) M Safwat	6	5	[10]
(United States) E King (United States) N Pasha	2	7	[12]
(Barbados) D King (Canada) P Polansky	6^{5}	6	[3]
2	(India) J Nedunchezhiyan (India) P Raja	7^{7}	2	[10]

Quarterfinals
1	(El Salvador) M Arévalo (Mexico) MÁ Reyes-Varela	w/o
ITF	(Spain) A Artuñedo (France) B Crepatte
4	(Mexico) H Hach Verdugo (Croatia) A Pavić	4	4
(Ecuador) G Escobar (Venezuela) LD Martínez	6	6
WC	(Mexico) A Hernández (Serbia) D Petrović	4	4
3	(Australia) M Reid (Australia) J-P Smith	6	6
(United States) E King (United States) N Pasha	4	2
2	(India) J Nedunchezhiyan (India) P Raja	6	6

Semifinals
1	(El Salvador) M Arévalo (Mexico) MÁ Reyes-Varela	1	6	[8]
(Ecuador) G Escobar (Venezuela) LD Martínez	6	4	[10]
3	(Australia) M Reid (Australia) J-P Smith	6	3	[10]
2	(India) J Nedunchezhiyan (India) P Raja	1	6	[8]

Final
(Ecuador) G Escobar (Venezuela) LD Martínez	6^{10}	3
3	(Australia) M Reid (Australia) J-P Smith	7^{12}	6
