= 2018 Puerto Vallarta Open =

- Date: 30 April – 5 May
- Edition: 1st
- Draw: 32S / 16D
- Surface: Hard
- Location: Puerto Vallarta, Mexico

Champions

Singles
- (Spain) Adrián Menéndez Maceiras

Doubles
- (Croatia) Ante Pavić / (Serbia) Danilo Petrović
Puerto Vallarta Open	· 2019 →

The 2018 Puerto Vallarta Open was a professional tennis tournament played on hardcourts. It was the 1st edition of the tournament which was part of the 2018 ATP Challenger Tour and took place in Puerto Vallarta, Mexico between 30 April and 5 May.

== Singles main-draw entrants ==
=== Seeds ===
Country	Player	Rank^{1}	Seed
ESP	Adrián Menéndez Maceiras	151	1
DOM	Víctor Estrella Burgos	168	2
USA	Kevin King	173	3
USA	Christopher Eubanks	246	4
SRB	Danilo Petrović	247	5
USA	Alexander Sarkissian	257	6
DOM	José Hernández-Fernández	261	7
ECU	Roberto Quiroz	280	8

- ^{1} Rankings are as of 23 April 2018.

=== Other entrants ===
The following players received wildcards into the singles main draw:

- (Mexico) Tigre Hank
- (Mexico) Gerardo López Villaseñor
- (Mexico) Manuel Sánchez
- (Mexico) Marcelo Sepúlveda

The following players received entry into the singles main draw using protected rankings:

- (Colombia) Nicolás Barrientos
- (Colombia) Alejandro Gómez

The following player received entry into the singles main draw as an alternate:

- (United Kingdom) Brydan Klein

The following players received entry from the qualifying draw:

- (Norway) Viktor Durasovic
- (Colombia) Felipe Mantilla
- (Venezuela) Luis David Martínez
- (United States) Evan Song

== Champions ==
=== Singles ===
- (Spain) Adrián Menéndez Maceiras def. (Serbia) Danilo Petrović 1–6, 7–5, 6–3.

=== Doubles ===
- (Croatia) Ante Pavić / (Serbia) Danilo Petrović def. (Zimbabwe) Benjamin Lock / (Brazil) Fernando Romboli 6–7^{(2–7)}, 6–4, [10–5].
