= 2013 Kunming Challenger – Singles =

Singles
- 2013 Kunming Challenger

Final
- Champion: (Russia) Alex Bogomolov Jr.
- Runner-up: (South Africa) Rik de Voest
- Score: 6–3, 4–6, 7–6^{(7–2)}

Events
| Singles | Doubles |
- Kunming Challenger

Alex Bogomolov Jr. won the first edition of the event by defeating Rik de Voest 6–3, 4–6, 7–6^{(7–2)} in the final.

== Seeds ==
1. (Chinese Taipei) Lu Yen-hsun (quarterfinals)
2. (Slovakia) Lukáš Lacko (first round)
3. (Israel) Dudi Sela (first round)
4. (Russia) Alex Bogomolov Jr. (champion)
5. (Japan) Go Soeda (first round)
6. (Japan) Tatsuma Ito (first round)
7. (Australia) Matthew Ebden (quarterfinals)
8. (Japan) Yūichi Sugita (first round)

== Draw ==
Key

- Q = Qualifier
- WC = Wild card
- LL = Lucky loser
- Alt = Alternate
- ITF = ITF entry
- PR = Protected ranking
- SR = Special ranking
- SE = Special exempt
- JE = Junior exempt
- JR = Junior Accelerator Programme entrant
- CO = College Accelerator Programme entrant
- NG = Next Gen Accelerator Program entrant
- w/o = Walkover
- r = Retired
- d = Defaulted

=== Finals ===
Semifinals
(South Africa) Rik de Voest | 6^{0} | 6 | 7^{7}
SE | (Chinese Taipei) Yang Tsung-hua | 7^{7} | 4 | 6^{1}
4 | (Russia) Alex Bogomolov Jr. | 1 | 6 | 6
Q | (Australia) John-Patrick Smith | 6 | 3 | 3

Final
(South Africa) Rik de Voest | 3 | 6 | 6^{2}
4 | (Russia) Alex Bogomolov Jr. | 6 | 4 | 7^{7}

=== Top half ===
First round
1 | (Chinese Taipei) Y-h Lu | 7 | 6
(Switzerland) M Chiudinelli | 5 | 3
(Japan) H Moriya | 6 | 6^{5} | 5
WC | (China) M Gong | 4 | 7^{7} | 7
(Thailand) D Udomchoke | 4 | 2
(Belgium) R Bemelmans | 6 | 6
(South Africa) R de Voest | 7^{7} | 6
6 | (Japan) T Ito | 6^{2} | 2
3 | (Israel) D Sela | 2 | 3
(China) D Wu | 6 | 6
SE | (Hungary) M Fucsovics | 6 | 5 | 3
(United Kingdom) J Ward | 3 | 7 | 6
WC | (China) Z Li | 3 | 3
Q | (Russia) V Baluda | 6 | 6
SE | (Chinese Taipei) T-h Yang | 6^{6} | 6 | 6
8 | (Japan) Y Sugita | 7^{8} | 4 | 3

Second round
1 | (Chinese Taipei) Y-h Lu | 6 | 6
WC | (China) M Gong | 3 | 1
(Belgium) R Bemelmans | 6 | 6^{4} | 3
(South Africa) R de Voest | 3 | 7^{7} | 6
(China) D Wu | 6 | 6
(United Kingdom) J Ward | 4 | 3
Q | (Russia) V Baluda | 6 | 6^{6} | 6^{5}
SE | (Chinese Taipei) T-h Yang | 4 | 7^{8} | 7^{7}

Quarterfinals
1 | (Chinese Taipei) Y-h Lu | 5 | 3
(South Africa) R de Voest | 7 | 6
(China) D Wu | 5 | 3
SE | (Chinese Taipei) T-h Yang | 7 | 6

Semifinals
(South Africa) R de Voest | 6^{0} | 6 | 7^{7}
SE | (Chinese Taipei) T-h Yang | 7^{7} | 4 | 6^{1}

=== Bottom half ===
First round
5 | (Japan) G Soeda | 6^{4} | 6^{1}
(Australia) S Groth | 7^{7} | 7^{7}
(Chinese Taipei) J Wang | 4 | 4
Q | (Lithuania) L Grigelis | 6 | 6
(France) V Millot | 3 | 2
(China) Z Zhang | 6 | 6
Q | (Republic of Ireland) J McGee | 0 | 3
4 | (Russia) A Bogomolov Jr. | 6 | 6
7 | (Australia) M Ebden | 6 | 6
WC | (China) Chang Yu | 4 | 4
(France) J Ouanna | 7^{7} | 6
(Indonesia) C Rungkat | 6^{2} | 3
WC | (China) B Ouyang | 1 | 4
Q | (Australia) J-P Smith | 6 | 6
(Australia) M Reid | 6 | 6
2 | (Slovakia) L Lacko | 3 | 4

Second round
(Australia) S Groth | 6 | 7^{7}
Q | (Lithuania) L Grigelis | 4 | 6^{4}
(China) Z Zhang | 7^{7} | 6^{7} | 3
4 | (Russia) A Bogomolov Jr. | 6^{3} | 7^{9} | 6
7 | (Australia) M Ebden | 6 | 2 | 6
(France) J Ouanna | 1 | 6 | 4
Q | (Australia) J-P Smith | 7^{7} | 6
(Australia) M Reid | 6^{5} | 2

Quarterfinals
(Australia) S Groth | 7^{7} | 4 | 2
4 | (Russia) A Bogomolov Jr. | 6^{4} | 6 | 6
7 | (Australia) M Ebden | 6 | 3 | 4
Q | (Australia) J-P Smith | 3 | 6 | 6

Semifinals
4 | (Russia) A Bogomolov Jr. | 1 | 6 | 6
Q | (Australia) J-P Smith | 6 | 3 | 3
