= 2023 Puerto Vallarta Open =

- Date: 6–12 March
- Edition: 4th
- Surface: Hard
- Location: Puerto Vallarta, Mexico

Champions

Singles
- (France) Benoît Paire

Doubles
- (United States) Robert Galloway / (Mexico) Miguel Ángel Reyes-Varela
← 2021 ·	Puerto Vallarta Open	· 2024 →

The 2023 Puerto Vallarta Open, known as Puerto Mágico Open Puerto Vallarta, was a professional tennis tournament played on hardcourts. It was the fourth edition of the tournament which was part of the 2023 ATP Challenger Tour. It took place in Puerto Vallarta, Mexico between 6 and 12 March 2023.

== Singles main-draw entrants ==
=== Seeds ===
Country	Player	Rank^{1}	Seed
GER	Daniel Altmaier	95	1
FRA	Enzo Couacaud	196	2
ARG	Facundo Mena	201	3
ARG	Juan Pablo Ficovich	205	4
FRA	Benoît Paire	207	5
CAN	Gabriel Diallo	211	6
KOR	Hong Seong-chan	214	7
GBR	Jan Choinski	218	8

- ^{1} Rankings are as of 27 February 2023.

=== Other entrants ===
The following players received wildcards into the singles main draw:

- (Mexico) Luca Lemaitre
- (Mexico) Rodrigo Pacheco Méndez
- (Mexico) Alan Fernando Rubio Fierros

The following players received entry into the singles main draw using protected rankings:

- (Australia) Alex Bolt
- (United States) Bjorn Fratangelo

The following players received entry into the singles main draw as alternates:

- (United States) Ulises Blanch
- (Spain) Daniel Rincón
- (Japan) Yuta Shimizu

The following players received entry from the qualifying draw:

- (Argentina) Guido Andreozzi
- (Italy) Jacopo Berrettini
- (United States) Christian Langmo
- (Ukraine) Illya Marchenko
- (Australia) James McCabe
- (New Zealand) Rubin Statham

== Champions ==
=== Singles ===
- (France) Benoît Paire def. (Japan) Yuta Shimizu 3–6, 6–0, 6–2.

=== Doubles ===
- (United States) Robert Galloway / (Mexico) Miguel Ángel Reyes-Varela def. (Sweden) André Göransson / (Japan) Ben McLachlan 3–0 retired.
