= 2023 Charlottesville Men's Pro Challenger =

- Date: 30 October – 5 November
- Edition: 14th
- Surface: Hard (indoor)
- Location: Charlottesville, United States

Champions

Singles
- (Kazakhstan) Beibit Zhukayev

Doubles
- (Australia) John-Patrick Smith / (Netherlands) Sem Verbeek
- Charlottesville Men's Pro Challenger

The 2023 Jonathan Fried Pro Challenger was a professional tennis tournament played on indoor hardcourts. It was the 14th edition of the tournament which was part of the 2023 ATP Challenger Tour, taking place in Charlottesville, United States from October 30 and November 5, 2023.

== Singles main-draw entrants ==
=== Seeds ===
Country	Player	Rank^{1}	Seed
USA	Michael Mmoh	102	1
USA	Alex Michelsen	112	2
FRA	Benoît Paire	123	3
USA	Zachary Svajda	143	4
USA	Emilio Nava	148	5
AUS	Adam Walton	175	6
USA	Denis Kudla	180	7
USA	Tennys Sandgren	203	8

- ^{1} Rankings are as of 23 October 2023.

=== Other entrants ===
The following players received wildcards into the singles main draw:

- (United States) Thai-Son Kwiatkowski
- (United States) Reilly Opelka
- (Luxembourg) Chris Rodesch

The following player received entry into the singles main draw as an alternate:

- (Germany) Lucas Gerch

The following players received entry from the qualifying draw:

- (United States) Alafia Ayeni
- (Barbados) Darian King
- (United States) Stefan Kozlov
- (United States) Aidan Mayo
- (Spain) Iñaki Montes de la Torre
- (United States) Ethan Quinn

== Champions ==
=== Singles ===
- (Kazakhstan) Beibit Zhukayev def. (United States) Aidan Mayo 6–3, 6–4.

=== Doubles ===
- (Australia) John-Patrick Smith / (Netherlands) Sem Verbeek def. (United States) Denis Kudla / (United States) Thai-Son Kwiatkowski 3–6, 6–3, [10–5].
