= 2013 Kunming Challenger – Doubles =

Doubles
- 2013 Kunming Challenger

Final
- Champions: (Australia) Samuel Groth (Australia) John-Patrick Smith
- Runners-up: (Japan) Go Soeda (Japan) Yasutaka Uchiyama
- Score: 6–4, 6–1

Events
Singles	Doubles
Kunming Challenger

Samuel Groth and John-Patrick Smith won the first edition of the tournament by defeating Go Soeda and Yasutaka Uchiyama 6–4, 6–1 in the final.

== Seeds ==
1. (Thailand) Sanchai Ratiwatana / (Thailand) Sonchat Ratiwatana (first round)
2. (Australia) Samuel Groth / (Australia) John-Patrick Smith (champions)
3. (India) Purav Raja / (India) Divij Sharan (semifinals)
4. (South Africa) Rik de Voest / (Australia) Chris Guccione (first round)

== Draw ==
=== Key ===
- Q = Qualifier
- WC = Wild card
- LL = Lucky loser
- Alt = Alternate
- SE = Special exempt
- PR = Protected ranking
- ITF = ITF entry
- JE = Junior exempt
- w/o = Walkover
- r = Retired
- d = Defaulted
- SR = Special ranking

=== Draw ===
First round
1	(Thailand) Sa Ratiwatana (Thailand) So Ratiwatana	3	6	[8]
(Indonesia) C Rungkat (New Zealand) J Statham	6	3	[10]
(Thailand) D Udomchoke (Chinese Taipei) J Wang	6	6
(France) V Millot (France) J Ouanna	2	4
4	(South Africa) R de Voest (Australia) C Guccione	6^{5}	6^{6}
Alt	(Japan) G Soeda (Japan) Y Uchiyama	7^{7}	7^{8}
(Belgium) R Bemelmans (United Kingdom) J Ward	6	7^{7}
WC	(China) Tan Haiyun (China) J Yang	3	6^{5}
(Switzerland) M Chiudinelli (Japan) T Ito	7^{7}	4	[10]
(Australia) M Ebden (Australia) M Reid	6^{4}	6	[7]
(Chinese Taipei) H-h Lee (Chinese Taipei) H-y Peng	6	3	[7]
3	(India) P Raja (India) D Sharan	4	6	[10]
WC	(China) X Gao (China) Z Li	1	1
WC	(China) M Gong (China) Z Zhang	6	6
(Russia) A Bogomolov Jr. (Israel) D Sela	7^{7}	5	[5]
2	(Australia) S Groth (Australia) J-P Smith	6^{4}	7	[10]

Quarterfinals
(Indonesia) C Rungkat (New Zealand) J Statham	4	6	[10]
(Thailand) D Udomchoke (Chinese Taipei) J Wang	6	4	[5]
Alt	(Japan) G Soeda (Japan) Y Uchiyama	6	6
(Belgium) R Bemelmans (United Kingdom) J Ward	0	1
(Switzerland) M Chiudinelli (Japan) T Ito
3	(India) P Raja (India) D Sharan	w/o
WC	(China) M Gong (China) Z Zhang	6	5	[8]
2	(Australia) S Groth (Australia) J-P Smith	3	7	[10]

Semifinals
(Indonesia) C Rungkat (New Zealand) J Statham	5	6	[8]
Alt	(Japan) G Soeda (Japan) Y Uchiyama	7	1	[10
3	(India) P Raja (India) D Sharan	2	6^{5}
2	(Australia) S Groth (Australia) J-P Smith	6	7^{7}

Final
Alt	(Japan) G Soeda (Japan) Y Uchiyama	4	1
2	(Australia) S Groth (Australia) J-P Smith	6	6
