= 2021 Puerto Vallarta Open =

- Date: 22–28 November
- Edition: 3rd
- Surface: Hard
- Location: Puerto Vallarta, Mexico

Champions

Singles
- (Germany) Daniel Altmaier

Doubles
- (Netherlands) Gijs Brouwer / (United States) Reese Stalder
← 2019 ·	Puerto Vallarta Open	· 2023 →

The 2021 Puerto Vallarta Open was a professional tennis tournament played on hardcourts. It was the third edition of the tournament which was part of the 2021 ATP Challenger Tour. It took place in Puerto Vallarta, Mexico between 22 and 28 November 2021.

== Singles main-draw entrants ==
=== Seeds ===
Country	Player	Rank^{1}	Seed
URU	Pablo Cuevas	95	1
GER	Daniel Altmaier	98	2
CHI	Alejandro Tabilo	141	3
USA	Ernesto Escobedo	163	4
USA	Michael Mmoh	247	5
USA	Christian Harrison	252	6
TPE	Wu Tung-lin	264	7
JPN	Tatsuma Ito	283	8

- ^{1} Rankings are as of 15 November 2021.

=== Other entrants ===
The following players received wildcards into the singles main draw:

- (United States) Milledge Cossu
- (Mexico) Gerardo López Villaseñor
- (China) Shang Juncheng

The following players received entry into the singles main draw using protected rankings:

- (United States) Alexander Sarkissian
- (New Zealand) Rubin Statham

The following players received entry into the singles main draw as alternates:

- (Uruguay) Martín Cuevas
- (Argentina) Matías Franco Descotte

The following players received entry from the qualifying draw:

- (Canada) Liam Draxl
- (Mexico) Alex Hernández
- (United States) Christian Langmo
- (United States) Govind Nanda

== Champions ==
=== Singles ===
- (Germany) Daniel Altmaier def. (Chile) Alejandro Tabilo 6–3, 3–6, 6–3.

=== Doubles ===
- (Netherlands) Gijs Brouwer / (United States) Reese Stalder def. (Mexico) Hans Hach Verdugo / (Mexico) Miguel Ángel Reyes-Varela 6–4, 6–4.
