= 2018 Puerto Vallarta Open – Doubles =

Doubles
- 2018 Puerto Vallarta Open

Final
- Champions: (Croatia) Ante Pavić (Serbia) Danilo Petrović
- Runners-up: (Zimbabwe) Benjamin Lock (Brazil) Fernando Romboli
- Score: 6–7^{(2–7)}, 6–4, [10–5]

Events
Singles	Doubles
- Puerto Vallarta Open

This was the first edition of the tournament.

Ante Pavić and Danilo Petrović won the title after defeating Benjamin Lock and Fernando Romboli 6–7^{(2–7)}, 6–4, [10–5] in the final.

== Seeds ==
1. (United States) Austin Krajicek / (Venezuela) Roberto Maytín (first round)
2. (United Kingdom) Brydan Klein / (South Africa) Ruan Roelofse (first round)
3. (Australia) Bradley Mousley / (New Zealand) Rubin Statham (first round)
4. (Zimbabwe) Benjamin Lock / (Brazil) Fernando Romboli (final)

== Draw ==
Key

- Q = Qualifier
- WC = Wild card
- LL = Lucky loser
- Alt = Alternate
- ITF = ITF entry
- PR = Protected ranking
- SR = Special ranking
- SE = Special exempt
- JE = Junior exempt
- JR = Junior Accelerator Programme entrant
- CO = College Accelerator Programme entrant
- NG = Next Gen Accelerator Program entrant
- w/o = Walkover
- r = Retired
- d = Defaulted

First round
1	(United States) A Krajicek (Venezuela) R Maytín	4	3
(Ecuador) G Escobar (Mexico) M Sánchez	6	6
(Mexico) H Hach Verdugo (Venezuela) LD Martínez	6	6
WC	(Mexico) Ivar José Aramburu Contreras (Mexico) Juan Ignacio Batalla	2	2
3	(Australia) B Mousley (New Zealand) R Statham	3	5
(Croatia) A Pavić (Serbia) D Petrović	6	7
Alt	(Guatemala) C Díaz Figueroa (Brazil) D Dutra da Silva	6	6
WC	(Mexico) L Gómez (Mexico) T Hank	2	4
PR	(United States) K King (South Africa) D O'Brien	5	4
(Colombia) S Giraldo (Spain) C Gómez-Herrera	7	6
(France) U Humbert (Israel) E Leshem	4	6^{3}
4	(Zimbabwe) B Lock (Brazil) F Romboli	6	7^{7}
PR	(Colombia) N Barrientos (Colombia) A Gómez	6	4	[12]
WC	(Mexico) G López Villaseñor (Mexico) L Patiño	4	6	[10]
(Bolivia) B Arias (Bolivia) F Zeballos	1	7	[13]
2	(United Kingdom) B Klein (South Africa) R Roelofse	6	5	[11]

Quarterfinals
(Ecuador) G Escobar (Mexico) M Sánchez	7^{7}	6
(Mexico) H Hach Verdugo (Venezuela) LD Martínez	6^{4}	4
(Croatia) A Pavić (Serbia) D Petrović	6	6
Alt	(Guatemala) C Díaz Figueroa (Brazil) D Dutra da Silva	3	4
(Colombia) S Giraldo (Spain) C Gómez-Herrera
4	(Zimbabwe) B Lock (Brazil) F Romboli	w/o
PR	(Colombia) N Barrientos (Colombia) A Gómez	6	2	[10]
(Bolivia) B Arias (Bolivia) F Zeballos	3	6	[8]

Semifinals
(Ecuador) G Escobar (Mexico) M Sánchez	3	6	[11]
(Croatia) A Pavić (Serbia) D Petrović	6	3	[13]
4	(Zimbabwe) B Lock (Brazil) F Romboli	6	6
PR	(Colombia) N Barrientos (Colombia) A Gómez	3	4

Final
(Croatia) A Pavić (Serbia) D Petrović	6^{2}	6	[10]
4	(Zimbabwe) B Lock (Brazil) F Romboli	7^{7}	4	[5]
