= 2019 Puerto Vallarta Open – Singles =

Singles
- 2019 Puerto Vallarta Open

Final
- Champion: (Austria) Sebastian Ofner
- Runner-up: (Australia) John-Patrick Smith
- Score: 7–6^{(10–8)}, 3–6, 6–3

Events
Singles	Doubles
- Puerto Vallarta Open

Adrián Menéndez Maceiras was the defending champion but lost in the third round to Lucas Miedler.

Sebastian Ofner won the title after defeating John-Patrick Smith 7–6^{(10–8)}, 3–6, 6–3 in the final.

== Seeds ==
All seeds receive a bye into the second round.

1. (Kazakhstan) Alexander Bublik (second round)
2. (Spain) Adrián Menéndez Maceiras (third round)
3. (Canada) Peter Polansky (third round)
4. (Germany) Dustin Brown (third round)
5. (Austria) Sebastian Ofner (champion)
6. (United Kingdom) James Ward (third round)
7. (Egypt) Mohamed Safwat (third round)
8. (United States) Donald Young (second round)
9. (Bosnia and Herzegovina) Mirza Bašić (semifinals)
10. (Colombia) Santiago Giraldo (withdrew)
11. (Ecuador) Roberto Quiroz (third round)
12. (Serbia) Peđa Krstin (second round)
13. (Barbados) Darian King (quarterfinals)
14. (Australia) John-Patrick Smith (final)
15. (Austria) Lucas Miedler (quarterfinals)
16. (Slovenia) Blaž Rola (quarterfinals)

== Draw ==
Key

- Q = Qualifier
- WC = Wild card
- LL = Lucky loser
- Alt = Alternate
- ITF = ITF entry
- PR = Protected ranking
- SR = Special ranking
- SE = Special exempt
- JE = Junior exempt
- JR = Junior Accelerator Programme entrant
- CO = College Accelerator Programme entrant
- NG = Next Gen Accelerator Program entrant
- w/o = Walkover
- r = Retired
- d = Defaulted

=== Finals ===
Quarterfinals
13	(Barbados) Darian King	1	7	5
ITF	(Chile) Alejandro Tabilo	6	5	7
14	(Australia) John-Patrick Smith	6	6
(Japan) Yusuke Takahashi	3	4
9	(Bosnia and Herzegovina) Mirza Bašić	6	3	6
16	(Slovenia) Blaž Rola	4	6	4
5	(Austria) Sebastian Ofner	6	6
15	(Austria) Lucas Miedler	2	3

Semifinals
ITF	(Chile) Alejandro Tabilo	1	6	3
14	(Australia) John-Patrick Smith	6	3	6
9	(Bosnia and Herzegovina) Mirza Bašić	4	3
5	(Austria) Sebastian Ofner	6	6

Final
14	(Australia) John-Patrick Smith	6^{8}	6	3
5	(Austria) Sebastian Ofner	7^{10}	3	6

=== Top half ===
==== Section 1 ====
First round
ITF	(Brazil) J Menezes	6	5
(Argentina) R Olivo	1	1^{r}
ITF	(Spain) A Artuñedo	6	6
Q	(Canada) Pavel Krainik	3	2
(United Kingdom) L Broady	6	1	4
ITF	(Chile) A Tabilo	2	6	6
(United States) A Sarkissian	4	7^{7}	6
(United States) Evan Song	6	6^{4}	1

Second round
1	(Kazakhstan) A Bublik	6	3	4
ITF	(Brazil) J Menezes	4	6	6
ITF	(Spain) A Artuñedo	4	4
13	(Barbados) D King	6	6
12	(Serbia) P Krstin	5	3
ITF	(Chile) A Tabilo	7	6
(United States) A Sarkissian	1	7^{7}	6
8	(United States) D Young	6	6^{5}	2

Third round
ITF	(Brazil) J Menezes	5	5
13	(Barbados) D King	7	7
ITF	(Chile) A Tabilo	6	6
(United States) A Sarkissian	0	2

Quarterfinals
13	(Barbados) D King	1	7	5
ITF	(Chile) A Tabilo	6	5	7

==== Section 2 ====
First round
ITF	(France) Baptiste Crepatte	1	4
(United States) K King	6	6
WC	(Mexico) L Patiño	6	3	1
(France) H Grenier	1	6	6
(Spain) R Ortega Olmedo	5	1
(Japan) Y Takahashi	7	6
Q	(Argentina) F Mena	6	7^{10}
(Serbia) D Petrović	1	6^{8}

Second round
4	(Germany) D Brown	6	3	6
(United States) K King	3	6	4
(France) H Grenier	6	1^{r}
14	(Australia) J-P Smith	4	4
Alt	(United States) A Ayeni	4	6	3
(Japan) Y Takahashi	6	4	6
Q	(Argentina) F Mena	4	3
6	(United Kingdom) J Ward	6	6

Third round
4	(Germany) D Brown	3	6	2
14	(Australia) J-P Smith	6	3	6
(Japan) Y Takahashi	2	6	6
6	(United Kingdom) J Ward	6	4	3

Quarterfinals
14	(Australia) J-P Smith	6	6
(Japan) Y Takahashi	3	4

=== Bottom half ===
==== Section 3 ====
First round
ITF	(Tunisia) S Mansouri	6	6
(United States) Mi Redlicki	4	4
(Dominican Republic) V Estrella Burgos	6	6
WC	(Mexico) G López Villaseñor	1	2
(Spain) C Gómez-Herrera	6	7
(United States) E King	3	5
(El Salvador) M Arévalo	6	6
WC	(Mexico) L Gómez	3	4

Second round
7	(Egypt) M Safwat	6	6
ITF	(Tunisia) S Mansouri	4	3
(Dominican Republic) V Estrella Burgos	0	3
9	(Bosnia and Herzegovina) M Bašić	6	6
16	(Slovenia) B Rola	6	6
(Spain) C Gómez-Herrera	4	4
(El Salvador) M Arévalo	6	4	3
3/WC	(Canada) P Polansky	3	6	6

Third round
7	(Egypt) M Safwat	1	4
9	(Bosnia and Herzegovina) M Bašić	6	6
16	(Slovenia) B Rola	7^{9}	6^{6}	6
3/WC	(Canada) P Polansky	6^{7}	7^{8}	1

Quarterfinals
9	(Bosnia and Herzegovina) M Bašić	6	3	6
16	(Slovenia) B Rola	4	6	4

==== Section 4 ====
First round
(Argentina) MF Descotte	6^{1}	6^{7}
(France) V Millot	7^{7}	7^{9}
(Ecuador) G Escobar	2	2
(Switzerland) M-A Hüsler	6	6
(United States) E Escobedo	7^{7}	3	7^{7}
(Croatia) A Pavić	6^{5}	6	6^{5}
WC	(Mexico) M Sánchez	6	3	6
(Netherlands) S Griekspoor	3	6	3

Second round
5	(Austria) S Ofner	6^{4}	6	6
(France) V Millot	7^{7}	1	3
(Switzerland) M-A Hüsler	3	4
11	(Ecuador) R Quiroz	6	6
15	(Austria) L Miedler	6	6
(United States) E Escobedo	4	2
WC	(Mexico) M Sánchez	2	1
2	(Spain) A Menéndez Maceiras	6	6

Third round
5	(Austria) S Ofner	6	6
11	(Ecuador) R Quiroz	2	1
15	(Austria) L Miedler	6	6
2	(Spain) A Menéndez Maceiras	3	4

Quarterfinals
5	(Austria) S Ofner	6	6
15	(Austria) L Miedler	2	3
