= 2013 Kunming Challenger =

- Date: 6–12 May
- Edition: 1st
- Draw: 32S / 16D
- Prize money: $125,000
- Surface: Hard
- Location: Kunming, China

Champions

Singles
- (Russia) Alex Bogomolov Jr.

Doubles
- (Australia) Samuel Groth / (Australia) John-Patrick Smith
Kunming Challenger

The 2013 Kunming Challenger was a professional tennis tournament played on hard courts. It was the first edition of the tournament which was part of the 2013 ATP Challenger Tour. It took place in Kunming, China between 6 and 12 May 2013.

== Singles main-draw entrants ==
=== Seeds ===
Country	Player	Rank^{1}	Seed
TPE	Lu Yen-hsun	71	1
SVK	Lukáš Lacko	78	2
ISR	Dudi Sela	104	3
RUS	Alex Bogomolov Jr.	107	4
JPN	Go Soeda	114	5
JPN	Tatsuma Ito	124	6
AUS	Matthew Ebden	135	7
JPN	Yūichi Sugita	136	8

- ^{1} Rankings are as of April 29, 2013.

=== Other entrants ===
The following players received wildcards into the singles main draw:

- (China) Chang Yu
- (China) Gong Maoxin
- (China) Li Zhe
- (China) Ouyang Bowen

The following players received entry as a special exempt into the singles main draw:

- (Hungary) Márton Fucsovics
- (Chinese Taipei) Yang Tsung-hua

The following players received entry from the qualifying draw:

- (Russia) Victor Baluda
- (Lithuania) Laurynas Grigelis
- (Republic of Ireland) James McGee
- (Australia) John-Patrick Smith

== Doubles main-draw entrants ==
=== Seeds ===
Country	Player	Country	Player	Rank^{1}	Seed
THA	Sanchai Ratiwatana	THA	Sonchat Ratiwatana	146	1
AUS	Samuel Groth	AUS	John-Patrick Smith	210	2
IND	Purav Raja	IND	Divij Sharan	225	3
RSA	Rik de Voest	AUS	Chris Guccione	243	4

- ^{1} Rankings as of April 29, 2013.

=== Other entrants ===
The following pairs received wildcards into the doubles main draw:

- (China) Gao Xin / (China) Li Zhe
- (China) Gong Maoxin / (China) Zhang Ze
- (China) Tan Haiyun / (China) Yang Jingzhu

The following pair received entry as an alternate:

- (Japan) Go Soeda / (Japan) Yasutaka Uchiyama

== Champions ==
=== Singles ===
- (Russia) Alex Bogomolov Jr. def. (South Africa) Rik de Voest, 6–3, 4–6, 7–6^{(7–2)}

=== Doubles ===
- (Australia) Samuel Groth / (Australia) John-Patrick Smith def. (Japan) Go Soeda / (Japan) Yasutaka Uchiyama, 6–4, 6–1
