= 2018 Puerto Vallarta Open – Singles =

Singles
- 2018 Puerto Vallarta Open

Final
- Champion: (Spain) Adrián Menéndez Maceiras
- Runner-up: (Serbia) Danilo Petrović
- Score: 1–6, 7–5, 6–3

Events
Singles	Doubles
- Puerto Vallarta Open

This was the first edition of the tournament.

Adrián Menéndez Maceiras won the title after defeating Danilo Petrović 1–6, 7–5, 6–3 in the final.

== Seeds ==
1. (Spain) Adrián Menéndez Maceiras (champion)
2. (Dominican Republic) Víctor Estrella Burgos (second round)
3. (United States) Kevin King (semifinals)
4. (United States) Christopher Eubanks (first round)
5. (Serbia) Danilo Petrović (final)
6. (United States) Alexander Sarkissian (second round)
7. (Dominican Republic) José Hernández-Fernández (second round, retired)
8. (Ecuador) Roberto Quiroz (quarterfinals)

== Draw ==
Key

- Q = Qualifier
- WC = Wild card
- LL = Lucky loser
- Alt = Alternate
- ITF = ITF entry
- PR = Protected ranking
- SR = Special ranking
- SE = Special exempt
- JE = Junior exempt
- JR = Junior Accelerator Programme entrant
- CO = College Accelerator Programme entrant
- NG = Next Gen Accelerator Program entrant
- w/o = Walkover
- r = Retired
- d = Defaulted

=== Finals ===
Semifinals
1	(Spain) Adrián Menéndez Maceiras	3	6	7
3	(United States) Kevin King	6	0	5
5	(Serbia) Danilo Petrović	6	6
(Spain) Carlos Gómez-Herrera	3	3

Final
1	(Spain) Adrián Menéndez Maceiras	1	7	6
5	(Serbia) Danilo Petrović	6	5	3

=== Top half ===
First round
1	(Spain) A Menéndez Maceiras	6	3
(Australia) B Mousley	3	1^{r}
Alt	(United Kingdom) B Klein	4	7^{9}	1
Q	(Colombia) Felipe Mantilla	6	6^{7}	6
(Colombia) A González	2	7	2
(Dominican Republic) R Cid Subervi	6	5	6
(New Zealand) R Statham	2	4
7	(Dominican Republic) J Hernández-Fernández	6	6
3	(United States) K King	6	6
(South Africa) N Scholtz	3	1
WC	(Mexico) T Hank	6	2	7^{7}
PR	(Colombia) A Gómez	4	6	6^{3}
(United States) A Krajicek	3	4
(Israel) E Leshem	6	6
Q	(United States) Evan Song	6^{6}	3
8	(Ecuador) R Quiroz	7^{8}	6

Second round
1	(Spain) A Menéndez Maceiras	4	7	6
Q	(Colombia) F Mantilla	6	5	2
(Dominican Republic) R Cid Subervi	5
7	(Dominican Republic) J Hernández-Fernández	0^{r}
3	(United States) K King	6	6
WC	(Mexico) T Hank	3	2
(Israel) E Leshem	2	6	3
8	(Ecuador) R Quiroz	6	3	6

Quarterfinals
1	(Spain) A Menéndez Maceiras	6	7^{8}
(Dominican Republic) R Cid Subervi	4	6^{6}
3	(United States) K King	6	7
8	(Ecuador) R Quiroz	2	5

Semifinals
1	(Spain) A Menéndez Maceiras	3	6	7
3	(United States) K King	6	0	5

=== Bottom half ===
First round
5	(Serbia) D Petrović	6	1	6
(Ecuador) G Escobar	3	6	2
PR	(Colombia) N Barrientos	6^{7}	2
(France) U Humbert	7^{9}	6
(Croatia) A Pavić	6	6
WC	(Mexico) M Sánchez	2	3
Q	(Norway) V Durasovic	7^{8}	6
4	(United States) C Eubanks	6^{6}	3
6	(United States) A Sarkissian	2	6	6
WC	(Mexico) G López Villaseñor	6	3	4
WC	(Mexico) Marcelo Sepúlveda	2	0
(Colombia) S Giraldo	6	6
Q	(Venezuela) LD Martínez	3	6	2
(Spain) C Gómez-Herrera	6	2	6
(Brazil) D Dutra da Silva	1	1
2	(Dominican Republic) V Estrella Burgos	6	6

Second round
5	(Serbia) D Petrović	6	3	6
(France) U Humbert	4	6	3
(Croatia) A Pavić	7^{7}	6
Q	(Norway) V Durasovic	6^{3}	2
6	(United States) A Sarkissian	3	6^{2}
(Colombia) S Giraldo	6	7^{7}
(Spain) C Gómez-Herrera	7^{7}	6
2	(Dominican Republic) V Estrella Burgos	6^{2}	3

Quarterfinals
5	(Serbia) D Petrović	6	6
(Croatia) A Pavić	3	2
(Colombia) S Giraldo	6	5	6^{1}
(Spain) C Gómez-Herrera	1	7	7^{7}

Semifinals
5	(Serbia) D Petrović	6	6
(Spain) C Gómez-Herrera	3	3
