= 2023 Puerto Vallarta Open – Doubles =

Doubles
- 2023 Puerto Vallarta Open

Final
- Champions: (United States) Robert Galloway (Mexico) Miguel Ángel Reyes-Varela
- Runners-up: (Sweden) André Göransson (Japan) Ben McLachlan
- Score: 3–0 ret.

Events
| Singles | Doubles |
- Puerto Vallarta Open

Gijs Brouwer and Reese Stalder were the defending champions but only Stalder chose to defend his title, partnering Evan King. Stalder lost in the first round to André Göransson and Ben McLachlan.

Robert Galloway and Miguel Ángel Reyes-Varela won the title after Göransson and McLachlan retired trailing 0–3 in the first set in the final.

== Seeds ==
1. (France) Sadio Doumbia / (France) Fabien Reboul (semifinals)
2. (Colombia) Nicolás Barrientos / (Uruguay) Ariel Behar (quarterfinals)
3. (Sweden) André Göransson / (Japan) Ben McLachlan (final, retired)
4. (United States) Robert Galloway / (Mexico) Miguel Ángel Reyes-Varela (champions)

== Draw ==
Key

- Q = Qualifier
- WC = Wild card
- LL = Lucky loser
- Alt = Alternate
- ITF = ITF entry
- PR = Protected ranking
- SR = Special ranking
- SE = Special exempt
- JE = Junior exempt
- JR = Junior Accelerator Programme entrant
- CO = College Accelerator Programme entrant
- NG = Next Gen Accelerator Program entrant
- w/o = Walkover
- r = Retired
- d = Defaulted

First round
1 | (France) S Doumbia (France) F Reboul | 1 | 7 | [10]
(Argentina) G Andreozzi (Argentina) G Durán | 6 | 5 | [6]
(Mexico) H Hach Verdugo (France) N Mahut | 7^{7} | 6
(South Korea) S-c Hong (South Korea) J-s Nam | 6^{3} | 3
4 | (United States) R Galloway (Mexico) MÁ Reyes-Varela | 6 | 3 | [10]
WC | (France) Luc Fomba (Mexico) R Pacheco Méndez | 1 | 6 | [6]
(Bolivia) B Arias (Bolivia) F Zeballos | 7^{7} | 4 | [10]
(United States) A Lawson (United States) K Smith | 6^{3} | 6 | [5]
(United Kingdom) J Choinski (Colombia) N Mejía | 4 | 2
WC | (Mexico) Daniel Moreno (France) B Paire | 6 | 6
(United States) E King (United States) R Stalder | 5 | 5
3 | (Sweden) A Göransson (Japan) B McLachlan | 7 | 7
(Argentina) JP Ficovich (Argentina) F Mena | 4 | 4
(Australia) A Harris (United States) C Harrison | 6 | 6
(United States) W Blumberg (Venezuela) LD Martínez | 7^{7} | 6^{5} | [6]
2 | (Colombia) N Barrientos (Uruguay) A Behar | 6^{4} | 7^{7} | [10]

Quarterfinals
1 | (France) S Doumbia (France) F Reboul | 6^{5} | 7^{7} | [10]
(Mexico) H Hach Verdugo (France) N Mahut | 7^{7} | 6^{3} | [7]
4 | (United States) R Galloway (Mexico) MÁ Reyes-Varela | 7 | 7^{7}
(Bolivia) B Arias (Bolivia) F Zeballos | 5 | 6^{3}
WC | (Mexico) D Moreno (France) B Paire | 4 | 3
3 | (Sweden) A Göransson (Japan) B McLachlan | 6 | 6
(Australia) A Harris (United States) C Harrison | 6 | 2 | [12]
2 | (Colombia) N Barrientos (Uruguay) A Behar | 3 | 6 | [10]

Semifinals
1 | (France) S Doumbia (France) F Reboul | 2 | 4
4 | (United States) R Galloway (Mexico) MÁ Reyes-Varela | 6 | 6
3 | (Sweden) A Göransson (Japan) B McLachlan | 7^{7} | 6
(Australia) A Harris (United States) C Harrison | 6^{1} | 2

Final
4 | (United States) R Galloway (Mexico) MÁ Reyes-Varela | 3
3 | (Sweden) A Göransson (Japan) B McLachlan | 0^{r}
