= 2016 AON Open Challenger – Singles =

Singles
- 2016 AON Open Challenger

Final
- Champion: (Poland) Jerzy Janowicz
- Runner-up: (Spain) Nicolás Almagro
- Score: 7–6^{(7–5)}, 6–4

Events
Singles	Doubles
← 2015 ·	AON Open Challenger	· 2017 →

Nicolás Almagro was the defending champion but lost in the final, 7–6^{(7–5)}, 6–4, to Jerzy Janowicz.

== Seeds ==
1. (Spain) Nicolás Almagro (final)
2. (Argentina) Horacio Zeballos (second round)
3. (Argentina) Carlos Berlocq (semifinals)
4. (Spain) Roberto Carballés Baena (second round)
5. (Russia) Teymuraz Gabashvili (second round)
6. (Uzbekistan) Denis Istomin (quarterfinals)
7. (Czech Republic) Adam Pavlásek (semifinals)
8. (Slovakia) Jozef Kovalík (quarterfinals)

== Draw ==
=== Key ===
- Q = Qualifier
- WC = Wild card
- LL = Lucky loser
- Alt = Alternate
- SE = Special exempt
- PR = Protected ranking
- ITF = ITF entry
- JE = Junior exempt
- w/o = Walkover
- r = Retired
- d = Defaulted
- SR = Special ranking

=== Finals ===
Semifinals
1/WC	(Spain) Nicolás Almagro	6	2	6
7	(Czech Republic) Adam Pavlásek	0	6	4
3	(Argentina) Carlos Berlocq	6	5	6^{4}
(Poland) Jerzy Janowicz	3	7	7^{7}

Final
1/WC	(Spain) Nicolás Almagro	6^{5}	4
(Poland) Jerzy Janowicz	7^{7}	6

=== Top half ===
First round
1/WC	(Spain) N Almagro	1	6	7
WC	(Italy) G Quinzi	6	4	5
(Serbia) L Đere	6	3	6
(Serbia) M Zekić	3	6	1
Q	(Serbia) D Petrović	7	3
(Italy) F Volandri	5	0^{r}
(India) R Ramanathan	3	4
6/WC	(Uzbekistan) D Istomin	6	6
4	(Spain) R Carballés Baena	4	6	7
(Italy) M Donati	6	2	5
(Sweden) E Ymer	6^{5}	6	1
(France) K de Schepper	7^{7}	3	6
(Canada) S Diez	4	6^{5}
(Italy) M Cecchinato	6	7^{7}
Q	(Poland) H Hurkacz	4	4
7	(Czech Republic) A Pavlásek	6	6

Second round
1/WC	(Spain) N Almagro	7^{8}	5	6
(Serbia) L Đere	6^{6}	7	4
Q	(Serbia) D Petrović	6	3	0^{r}
6/WC	(Uzbekistan) D Istomin	4	6	3
4	(Spain) R Carballés Baena	4	4
(France) K de Schepper	6	6
(Italy) M Cecchinato	6	4	2
7	(Czech Republic) A Pavlásek	2	6	6

Quarterfinals
1/WC	(Spain) N Almagro	6	7^{7}
6/WC	(Uzbekistan) D Istomin	2	6^{1}
(France) K de Schepper	6	4	4
7	(Czech Republic) A Pavlásek	2	6	6

Semifinals
1/WC	(Spain) N Almagro	6	2	6
7	(Czech Republic) A Pavlásek	0	6	4

=== Bottom half ===
First round
8	(Slovakia) J Kovalík	6	6
(Spain) A Montañés	4	3
(Italy) A Arnaboldi	2	6	6
(Italy) F Gaio	6	4	1
(Romania) A Ungur	6	6
Q	(Croatia) D Marcan	2	4
(Russia) A Vatutin	3	6	0
3	(Argentina) C Berlocq	6	2	6
5	(Russia) T Gabashvili	7^{7}	7^{13}
(Spain) T Robredo	6^{3}	6^{11}
WC	(Italy) Edoardo Eremin	6	4	3
Q	(Italy) G Mager	1	6	6
(Poland) J Janowicz	6	6^{5}	7
Alt	(Italy) L Sonego	3	7^{7}	5
(Italy) S Napolitano	3	4
2	(Argentina) H Zeballos	6	6

Second round
8	(Slovakia) J Kovalík	7	7^{7}
(Italy) A Arnaboldi	5	6^{1}
(Romania) A Ungur	5	0
3	(Argentina) C Berlocq	7	6
5	(Russia) T Gabashvili	4	3
Q	(Italy) G Mager	6	6
(Poland) J Janowicz	7	6
2	(Argentina) H Zeballos	5	4

Quarterfinals
8	(Slovakia) J Kovalík	3	6	6^{6}
3	(Argentina) C Berlocq	6	4	7^{8}
Q	(Italy) G Mager	4	3
(Poland) J Janowicz	6	6

Semifinals
3	(Argentina) C Berlocq	6	5	6^{4}
(Poland) J Janowicz	3	7	7^{7}
