= 2023 Charlottesville Men's Pro Challenger – Singles =

Singles
- 2023 Charlottesville Men's Pro Challenger

Final
- Champion: (Kazakhstan) Beibit Zhukayev
- Runner-up: (United States) Aidan Mayo
- Score: 6–3, 6–4

Events
Singles	Doubles
← 2022 ·	Charlottesville Men's Pro Challenger	· 2024 →

Ben Shelton was the defending champion but chose not to defend his title.

Beibit Zhukayev won the title after defeating Aidan Mayo 6–3, 6–4 in the final.

== Seeds ==
1. (United States) Michael Mmoh (second round)
2. (United States) Alex Michelsen (first round)
3. (France) Benoît Paire (quarterfinals)
4. (United States) Zachary Svajda (first round)
5. (United States) Emilio Nava (second round)
6. (Australia) Adam Walton (first round)
7. (United States) Denis Kudla (second round)
8. (United States) Tennys Sandgren (first round)

== Draw ==
Key

- Q = Qualifier
- WC = Wild card
- LL = Lucky loser
- Alt = Alternate
- ITF = ITF entry
- PR = Protected ranking
- SR = Special ranking
- SE = Special exempt
- JE = Junior exempt
- JR = Junior Accelerator Programme entrant
- CO = College Accelerator Programme entrant
- NG = Next Gen Accelerator Program entrant
- w/o = Walkover
- r = Retired
- d = Defaulted

=== Finals ===
Semifinals
Q	(United States) Aidan Mayo	3	6	6
Q	(United States) Ethan Quinn	6	4	3
(Kazakhstan) Beibit Zhukayev	6	7^{7}
(United States) Patrick Kypson	4	6^{4}

Final
Q	(United States) Aidan Mayo	3	4
(Kazakhstan) Beibit Zhukayev	6	6

=== Top half ===
First round
1	(United States) M Mmoh	7^{8}	7
(United States) S Johnson	6^{6}	5
(Switzerland) A Ritschard	6	6
(United Kingdom) A McHugh	4	4
Q	(United States) A Mayo	7	6
Q	(United States) A Ayeni	5	2
WC	(United States) R Opelka	6	7
8	(United States) T Sandgren	4	5
3	(France) B Paire	7^{7}	6
Q	(Barbados) D King	6^{3}	2
Alt	(Germany) Lucas Gerch	6	5	7^{7}
Q	(United States) S Kozlov	2	7	6^{5}
Q	(United States) E Quinn	3	7^{7}	6
(United States) M Krueger	6	6^{2}	4
(Australia) B Tomic	6	6^{1}	5
5	(United States) Em Nava	2	7^{7}	7

Second round
1	(United States) M Mmoh	3	6^{5}
(Switzerland) A Ritschard	6	7^{7}
Q	(United States) A Mayo	w/o
WC	(United States) R Opelka
3	(France) B Paire	w/o
Alt	(Germany) L Gerch
Q	(United States) E Quinn	6	6
5	(United States) Em Nava	3	1

Quarterfinals
(Switzerland) A Ritschard	3	4
Q	(United States) A Mayo	6	6
3	(France) B Paire	6^{5}	2
Q	(United States) E Quinn	7^{7}	6

Semifinals
Q	(United States) A Mayo	3	6	6
Q	(United States) E Quinn	6	4	3

=== Bottom half ===
First round
6	(Australia) A Walton	2	6	6^{4}
Q	(Spain) I Montes de la Torre	6	3	7^{7}
WC	(United States) T-S Kwiatkowski	6	6^{3}	6^{3}
(Kazakhstan) B Zhukayev	4	7^{7}	7^{7}
(United States) E Spizzirri	1	6	4
(Croatia) N Serdarušić	6	2	6
(United States) M Damm	2	6	7^{7}
4	(United States) Z Svajda	6	3	6^{3}
7	(United States) D Kudla	7^{7}	6
WC	(Luxembourg) C Rodesch	6^{5}	1
(United States) P Kypson	6	7
(France) G Debru	4	5
(Ecuador) E Gómez	2	2
(United States) B Holt	6	6
(United States) C Kingsley	7	6
2	(United States) A Michelsen	5	3

Second round
Q	(Spain) I Montes de la Torre	4	6^{8}
(Kazakhstan) B Zhukayev	6	7^{10}
(Croatia) N Serdarušić	7^{7}	3	6
(United States) M Damm	6^{5}	6	1
7	(United States) D Kudla	1	3
(United States) P Kypson	6	6
(United States) B Holt	6	6
(United States) C Kingsley	4	4

Quarterfinals
(Kazakhstan) B Zhukayev	6	6
(Croatia) N Serdarušić	3	4
(United States) P Kypson	6	6
(United States) B Holt	1	4

Semifinals
(Kazakhstan) B Zhukayev	6	7^{7}
(United States) P Kypson	4	6^{4}
