= 2023 Puerto Vallarta Open – Singles =

Singles
- 2023 Puerto Vallarta Open

Final
- Champion: (France) Benoît Paire
- Runner-up: (Japan) Yuta Shimizu
- Score: 3–6, 6–0, 6–2

Events
Singles	Doubles
← 2021 ·	Puerto Vallarta Open	· 2024 →

Daniel Altmaier was the defending champion but lost in the quarterfinals to Yuta Shimizu.

Benoît Paire won the title after defeating Shimizu 3–6, 6–0, 6–2 in the final.

== Seeds ==
1. (Germany) Daniel Altmaier (quarterfinals)
2. (France) Enzo Couacaud (first round)
3. (Argentina) Facundo Mena (first round, retired)
4. (Argentina) Juan Pablo Ficovich (first round)
5. (France) Benoît Paire (champion)
6. (Canada) Gabriel Diallo (first round)
7. (South Korea) Hong Seong-chan (first round)
8. (United Kingdom) Jan Choinski (first round)

== Draw ==
=== Key ===
- Q = Qualifier
- WC = Wild card
- LL = Lucky loser
- Alt = Alternate
- SE = Special exempt
- PR = Protected ranking
- ITF = ITF entry
- JE = Junior exempt
- w/o = Walkover
- r = Retired
- d = Defaulted
- SR = Special ranking

=== Finals ===
Semifinals
Alt	(Japan) Yuta Shimizu	7^{7}	6
Q	(Australia) James McCabe	6^{3}	1
Q	(Ukraine) Illya Marchenko	4	6	4
5	(France) Benoît Paire	6	4	6

Final
Alt	(Japan) Yuta Shimizu	6	0	2
5	(France) Benoît Paire	3	6	6

=== Top half ===
First round
1	(Germany) D Altmaier	6^{6}	7^{7}	6
(Germany) D Koepfer	7^{8}	6^{4}	1
Q	(Italy) J Berrettini	4	6^{6}
(Germany) Elmar Ejupovic	6	7^{8}
WC	(Mexico) Luca Lemaitre	3	1
(Canada) A Galarneau	6	6
Alt	(Japan) Y Shimizu	4	6	7^{7}
6	(Canada) G Diallo	6	3	6^{4}
4	(Argentina) JP Ficovich	3	6^{5}
Q	(Australia) J McCabe	6	7^{7}
(Japan) S Shimabukuro	6^{3}	6	6^{3}
Q	(New Zealand) R Statham	7^{7}	2	7^{7}
PR	(United States) B Fratangelo	6	6
PR	(Australia) A Bolt	2	4
Alt	(United States) U Blanch	6	6
7	(South Korea) S-c Hong	3	3

Second round
1	(Germany) D Altmaier	6	6
(Germany) E Ejupovic	0	1
(Canada) A Galarneau	4	2
Alt	(Japan) Y Shimizu	6	6
Q	(Australia) J McCabe	2	6	6
Q	(New Zealand) R Statham	6	1	3
PR	(United States) B Fratangelo	4	2
Alt	(United States) U Blanch	6	6

Quarterfinals
1	(Germany) D Altmaier	6	4	3
Alt	(Japan) Y Shimizu	3	6	6
Q	(Australia) J McCabe	6	5	6
Alt	(United States) U Blanch	4	7	3

Semifinals
Alt	(Japan) Y Shimizu	7^{7}	6
Q	(Australia) J McCabe	6^{3}	1

=== Bottom half ===
First round
8	(United Kingdom) J Choinski	4	4
Q	(United States) Christian Langmo	6	6
Q	(Ukraine) I Marchenko	6	6
Q	(Argentina) G Andreozzi	3	4
WC	(Mexico) R Pacheco Méndez	5	3
(Japan) S Mochizuki	7	6
(Portugal) G Elias	6	2
3	(Argentina) F Mena	1	0^{r}
5	(France) B Paire	6^{3}	6	7^{7}
(Colombia) N Mejía	7^{7}	1	6^{5}
Alt	(Spain) D Rincón	6	6
WC	(Mexico) AF Rubio Fierros	4	2
(Tunisia) A Dougaz	6	7^{7}
(Argentina) M Trungelliti	1	6^{1}
(Kazakhstan) D Yevseyev	2	7^{7}	6
2	(France) E Couacaud	6	6^{5}	2

Second round
Q	(United States) C Langmo	4	3
Q	(Ukraine) I Marchenko	6	6
(Japan) S Mochizuki	3	6	6^{5}
(Portugal) G Elias	6	2	7^{7}
5	(France) B Paire	6	5	6
Alt	(Spain) D Rincón	2	7	2
(Tunisia) A Dougaz	6	6
(Kazakhstan) D Yevseyev	1	0

Quarterfinals
Q	(Ukraine) I Marchenko	6^{4}	6	6
(Portugal) G Elias	7^{7}	3	0
5	(France) B Paire	6	6
(Tunisia) A Dougaz	3	4

Semifinals
Q	(Ukraine) I Marchenko	4	6	4
5	(France) B Paire	6	4	6
