= 2023 Charlottesville Men's Pro Challenger – Doubles =

Doubles
- 2023 Charlottesville Men's Pro Challenger

Final
- Champions: (Australia) John-Patrick Smith (Netherlands) Sem Verbeek
- Runners-up: (United States) Denis Kudla (United States) Thai-Son Kwiatkowski
- Score: 3–6, 6–3, [10–5]

Events
Singles	Doubles
- Charlottesville Men's Pro Challenger

Julian Cash and Henry Patten were the defending champions but chose not to defend their title.

John-Patrick Smith and Sem Verbeek won the title after defeating Denis Kudla and Thai-Son Kwiatkowski 3–6, 6–3, [10–5] in the final.

== Seeds ==
1. (Australia) John-Patrick Smith / (Netherlands) Sem Verbeek (champions)
2. (United States) William Blumberg / (Venezuela) Luis David Martínez (first round)
3. (United States) Christian Harrison / (Latvia) Miķelis Lībietis (first round)
4. (United States) Alex Lawson / (Australia) Adam Walton (first round)

== Draw ==
Key

- Q = Qualifier
- WC = Wild card
- LL = Lucky loser
- Alt = Alternate
- ITF = ITF entry
- PR = Protected ranking
- SR = Special ranking
- SE = Special exempt
- JE = Junior exempt
- JR = Junior Accelerator Programme entrant
- CO = College Accelerator Programme entrant
- NG = Next Gen Accelerator Program entrant
- w/o = Walkover
- r = Retired
- d = Defaulted

First round
1	(Australia) J-P Smith (Netherlands) S Verbeek	6	6
(United States) G Goldhoff (United States) A Perez	2	4
(Germany) S Fanselow (Germany) Lucas Gerch	6	1^{r}
WC	(Switzerland) D Dietrich (United Kingdom) James Hopper	4	2
4	(United States) A Lawson (Australia) A Walton	6	5	[11]
WC	(United States) M Damm (United States) A Rybakov	4	7	[13]
(United States) M Krueger (Switzerland) A Ritschard	7	4	[10]
(France) B Paire (New Zealand) A Sitak	5	6	[5]
(Mexico) H Hach Verdugo (United States) E Quinn	3	7	[13]
E Karlovskiy (Croatia) N Serdarušić	6	5	[15]
(United States) D Kudla (United States) T-S Kwiatkowski	6	7^{7}
3	(United States) C Harrison (Latvia) M Lībietis	3	6^{4}
(United States) Ezekiel Clark (France) G Debru	6^{5}	7^{7}	[3]
(United States) H Reese (Canada) B Sigouin	7^{7}	6^{0}	[10]
(United Kingdom) A McHugh (United States) T Sandgren	7^{10}	3	[11]
2	(United States) W Blumberg (Venezuela) LD Martínez	6^{8}	6	[9]

Quarterfinals
1	(Australia) J-P Smith (Netherlands) S Verbeek	7	6
WC	(Switzerland) D Dietrich (United Kingdom) J Hopper	5	3
WC	(United States) M Damm (United States) A Rybakov	6	6
(United States) M Krueger (Switzerland) A Ritschard	3	3
E Karlovskiy (Croatia) N Serdarušić	2	2
(United States) D Kudla (United States) T-S Kwiatkowski	6	6
(United States) H Reese (Canada) B Sigouin	6	4	[7]
(United Kingdom) A McHugh (United States) T Sandgren	4	6	[10]

Semifinals
1	(Australia) J-P Smith (Netherlands) S Verbeek	6	7^{8}
WC	(United States) M Damm (United States) A Rybakov	4	6^{6}
(United States) D Kudla (United States) T-S Kwiatkowski	6	6
(United Kingdom) A McHugh (United States) T Sandgren	1	4

Final
1	(Australia) J-P Smith (Netherlands) S Verbeek	3	6	[10]
(United States) D Kudla (United States) T-S Kwiatkowski	6	3	[5]
