= Gijs Brouwer =

Dutch tennis player (born 1996)

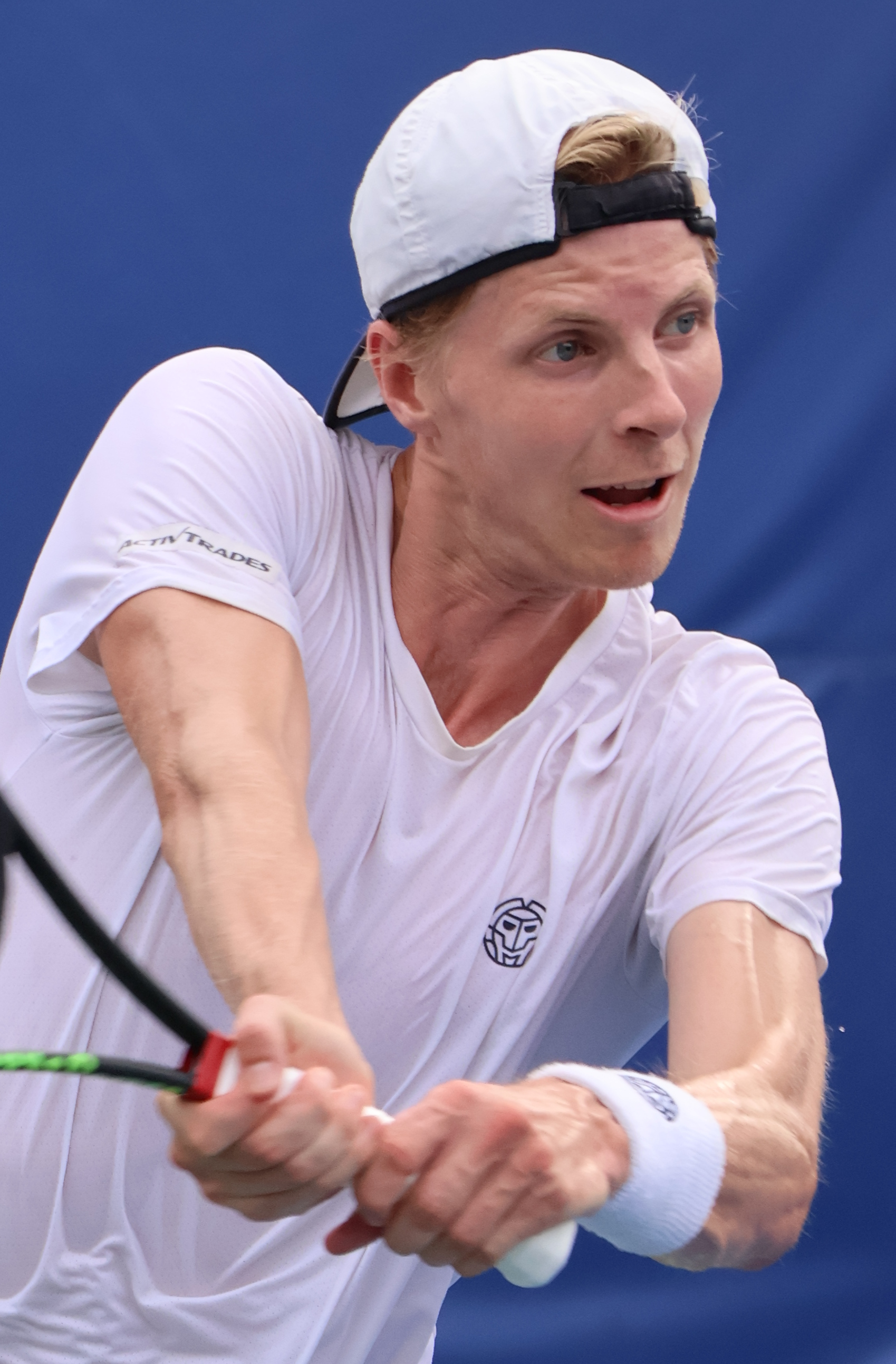
- Brouwer in 2023
- Country (sports): Netherlands
- Born: 14 March 1996 (age 30) Houston, United States
- Height: 1.91 m (6 ft 3 in)
- Turned pro: 2016
- Plays: Left-handed (two-handed backhand)
- Coach: Michiel Schapers, Marcel Petitjean
- Prize money: US $1,116,009

Singles
- Career record: 13–14
- Career titles: 0
- Highest ranking: No. 114 (27 February 2023)
- Current ranking: No. 754 (9 November 2026)

Grand Slam singles results
- Australian Open: Q1 (2023, 2024, 2025)
- French Open: Q1 (2023, 2025)
- Wimbledon: 1R (2023)
- US Open: 2R (2022)

Doubles
- Career record: 0–1
- Career titles: 0
- Highest ranking: No. 148 (22 August 2022)
- Last updated on: 9 November 2026.

Gijs Brouwer (Dutch pronunciation: [ɣɛiz ˈbrʌuər]; born 14 March 1996) is a Dutch tennis player. Brouwer has a career high ATP singles ranking of World No. 114 achieved on 27 February 2023 and a career high doubles ranking of World No. 148 achieved on 22 August 2022.

Brouwer has won two ATP Challenger doubles titles at the 2021 Puerto Vallarta Open with Reese Stalder and at the 2022 Tallahassee Tennis Challenger with Christian Harrison.

== Career ==
=== 2022: ATP & Major debut & top-50 win, top 150 in singles & doubles ===
On his ATP Tour debut at the 2022 U.S. Men's Clay Court Championships in Houston, Brouwer as a qualifier, made the quarterfinals after defeating Feliciano López and J. J. Wolf. He lost to third seed and eventual champion Reilly Opelka in the quarterfinals. As a result, he made his top 300 debut at world No. 286.

In May, Brouwer reached his first Challenger final at the 2022 Tunis Open losing to Roberto Carballés Baena.

Brouwer made his Grand Slam debut at the US Open as a qualifier. He recorded his first Major win defeating world No. 45 Adrian Mannarino. He reached the top 150 in the singles rankings on 12 September 2022.

=== 2023-24: First top-10 win & ATP semifinal, top 125 ===
Ranked No. 160 in Rotterdam, Brouwer was promoted from qualifying into the main draw, also as a wildcard, after the withdrawal of Gaël Monfils, where he defeated top-50 player Marc-Andrea Hüsler in the first round. He moved on to his first ATP hardcourt quarterfinal and only second in his career, after fourth seed Holger Rune retired in the second set of the match, his biggest, first top-10 win, and only his fifth on the ATP tour. As a result, he moved more than 40 positions to a new career high in the top 120 at No. 116 on 20 February 2023. It was the first time a Dutch duo, Brouwer and Tallon Griekspoor, reached the quarterfinals in singles of the home tournament, since Raemon Sluiter and Sjeng Schalken in 2003.

In April 2023, Brouwer repeated his Houston result from 2022, again reaching the quarterfinals after defeating Aleksandar Kovacevic and fourth seed John Isner. He went one step further to reach his first ATP semifinal with again a win over fifth seed J. J. Wolf in the quarterfinals, losing also to top seed and eventual champion Frances Tiafoe in the semifinals. He moved back to No. 116 in the rankings on 10 April 2023. He made his debut at the 2023 Wimbledon Championships after qualifying. He also qualified for the 2023 Moselle Open as a lucky loser directly into the second round replacing second seed Alex de Minaur after his late withdrawal, but lost to Pierre-Hugues Herbert.

Brower qualified for the 2024 U.S. Men's Clay Court Championships in Houston for a third year in a row defeating Mitchell Krueger in the last round of qualifying, but lost to James Duckworth in the first round of the main draw. At the 2024 Libéma Open he entered the main draw as a qualifier and defeated Jakub Menšík and fifth seed Adrian Mannarino to reach his first grass court quarterfinal. As a result, he moved 40 positions up in the rankings back into the top 200. At the 2024 Mallorca Championships, he entered the main draw as a lucky loser.

== ATP Challenger and ITF Tour Finals ==
=== Singles: 1 (0–1) ===
Legend (singles) ATP Challenger Tour (0–1) ITF Futures Tour (0–0)	Titles by surface Hard (0–0) Clay (0–1) Grass (0–0) Carpet (0–0)

Result	W–L	Date	Tournament	Category	Surface	Opponent	Score
Loss	0–1	May 2022	Tunis, Tunisia	Challenger	Clay	(Spain) Roberto Carballés Baena	1–6, 1–6

=== Doubles: 3 (2–1) ===
Legend (singles) ATP Challenger Tour (2–1) ITF Futures Tour (0–0)	Titles by surface Hard (0–1) Clay (2–0) Grass (0–0) Carpet (0–0)

Result	W–L	Date	Tournament	Category	Surface	Partner	Opponents	Score
Win	1–0	Nov 2021	Puerto Vallarta, Mexico	Challenger	Hard	(United States) Reese Stalder	(Mexico) Hans Hach Verdugo (Mexico) Miguel Ángel Reyes-Varela	6–4, 6–4
Win	2–0	Apr 2022	Tallahassee, USA	Challenger	Clay	(United States) Christian Harrison	(Ecuador) Diego Hidalgo (Colombia) Cristian Rodríguez	4–6, 7–5, [10–6]
Loss	2–1	Aug 2022	Lexington, USA	Challenger	Hard	(United Kingdom) Aidan McHugh	(India) Yuki Bhambri (India) Saketh Myneni	6-3, 4–6, [8-10]

== Record against top 10 players ==
=== Wins over top 10 players ===
Brouwer has a 1–0 record against players who were, at the time the match was played, ranked in the top 10.

Season	2023	Total
Wins	1	1

#	Player	Rank	Event	Surface	Rd	Score	GBR
2023
1.	(Denmark) Holger Rune	9	Rotterdam, Netherlands	Hard (i)	2R	6–4, 4–0 ret.	160
