= Kunming Challenger =

- 2013 Kunming Challenger

Defunct tennis tournament
- Location: Kunming, China
- Category: ATP Challenger Tour
- Surface: Hard
- Draw: 32S/16Q/16D
- Prize money: $125,000

The Kunming Challenger was a tennis tournament held in Kunming, China in 2013. The event was part of the ATP Challenger Tour and was played on hardcourts.

== Past finals ==
=== Singles ===
Year	Champion	Runner-up	Score
2013	(Russia) Alex Bogomolov Jr.	(South Africa) Rik de Voest	6–3, 4–6, 7–6^{(7–2)}

=== Doubles ===
Year	Champions	Runners-up	Score
2013	(Australia) Samuel Groth (Australia) John-Patrick Smith	(Japan) Go Soeda (Japan) Yasutaka Uchiyama	6–4, 6–1
