= 2019 Puerto Vallarta Open =

- Date: 29 April – 5 May
- Edition: 2nd
- Draw: 48S / 16D
- Surface: Hard
- Location: Puerto Vallarta, Mexico

Champions

Singles
- (Austria) Sebastian Ofner

Doubles
- (Australia) Matt Reid / (Australia) John-Patrick Smith
- Puerto Vallarta Open

The 2019 Puerto Vallarta Open was a professional tennis tournament played on hardcourts. It was the second edition of the tournament which was part of the 2019 ATP Challenger Tour. It took place in Puerto Vallarta, Mexico between 29 April and 5 May 2019.

== Singles main-draw entrants ==
=== Seeds ===
Country	Player	Rank^{1}	Seed
KAZ	Alexander Bublik	98	1
ESP	Adrián Menéndez Maceiras	124	2
CAN	Peter Polansky	127	3
GER	Dustin Brown	173	4
AUT	Sebastian Ofner	174	5
GBR	James Ward	188	6
EGY	Mohamed Safwat	190	7
USA	Donald Young	199	8
BIH	Mirza Bašić	200	9
~~COL~~	~~Santiago Giraldo~~	~~202~~	~~10~~
ECU	Roberto Quiroz	207	11
SRB	Peđa Krstin	209	12
BAR	Darian King	213	13
AUS	John-Patrick Smith	228	14
AUT	Lucas Miedler	240	15
SLO	Blaž Rola	263	16

- ^{1} Rankings are as of 22 April 2018.

=== Other entrants ===
The following players received wildcards into the singles main draw:

- (Mexico) Lucas Gómez
- (Mexico) Gerardo López Villaseñor
- (Mexico) Luis Patiño
- (Canada) Peter Polansky
- (Mexico) Manuel Sánchez

The following player received entry into the singles main draw as an alternate:

- (United States) Alafia Ayeni

The following players received entry into the singles main draw using their ITF World Tennis Ranking:

- (Spain) Andrés Artuñedo
- (France) Baptiste Crepatte
- (Tunisia) Skander Mansouri
- (Brazil) João Menezes
- (Chile) Alejandro Tabilo

The following players received entry from the qualifying draw:

- (Canada) Pavel Krainik
- (Argentina) Facundo Mena

== Champions ==
=== Singles ===
- (Austria) Sebastian Ofner def. (Australia) John-Patrick Smith 7–6^{(10–8)}, 3–6, 6–3.

=== Doubles ===
- (Australia) Matt Reid / (Australia) John-Patrick Smith def. (Ecuador) Gonzalo Escobar / (Venezuela) Luis David Martínez 7–6^{(12–10)}, 6–3.
