= John-Patrick Smith =

Australian tennis player (born 1989)

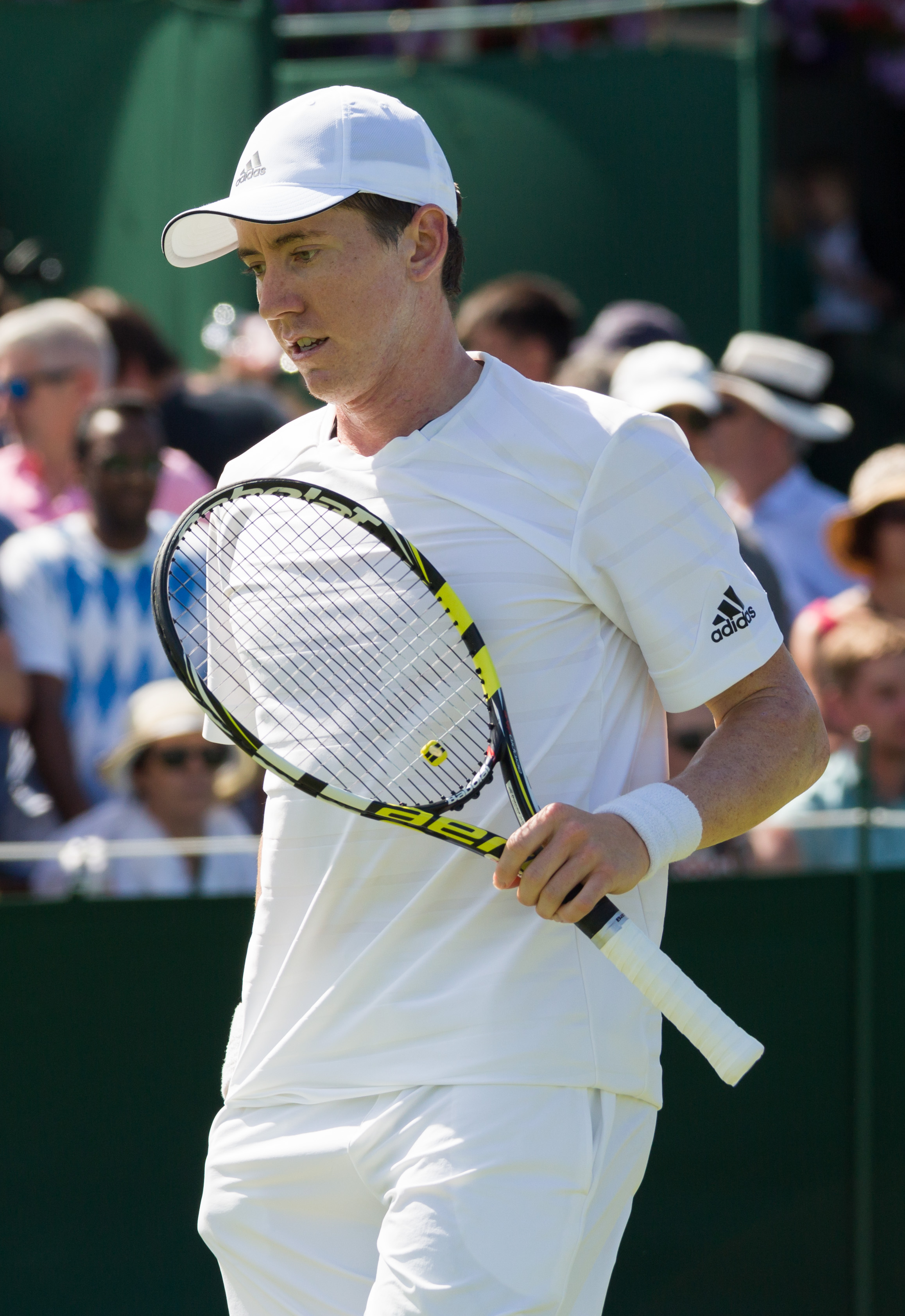
- Smith at Wimbledon in 2015
- Full name: John-Patrick Tracey Smith
- Country (sports): Australia
- Residence: Townsville, Queensland
- Born: 24 January 1989 (age 37) Townsville, Queensland
- Height: 188 cm (6 ft 2 in)
- Turned pro: July 2011
- Plays: Left-handed (two-handed backhand)
- College: University of Tennessee
- Coach: Cameron Whiting
- Prize money: US $ 2,213,897

Singles
- Career record: 5–22
- Career titles: 0
- Highest ranking: No. 108 (28 September 2015)

Grand Slam singles results
- Australian Open: 1R (2013, 2020)
- French Open: Q2 (2015)
- Wimbledon: 1R (2015, 2018)
- US Open: 1R (2015, 2017)

Doubles
- Career record: 114–142
- Career titles: 2
- Highest ranking: No. 39 (2 February 2026)
- Current ranking: No. 39 (2 February 2026)

Grand Slam doubles results
- Australian Open: QF (2021)
- French Open: 3R (2025)
- Wimbledon: 3R (2024)
- US Open: QF (2017)

Grand Slam mixed doubles results
- Australian Open: F (2019, 2025)
- Wimbledon: 1R (2017, 2021)
- Last updated on: 2 February 2026.

John-Patrick Tracey "JP" Smith (born 24 January 1989) is an Australian professional tennis player who specializes in doubles. He reached his highest ATP singles ranking of world No. 108 on 28 September 2015 and his highest doubles ranking of No. 39 on 2 February 2026.

Smith reached the finals of the 2019 Australian Open mixed doubles alongside fellow Australian Astra Sharma and of the 2025 Australian Open mixed doubles alongside another compatriot Kimberly Birrell.

== Personal life ==
Smith married long-time girlfriend Lauren Zuckerman in December 2023. In 2024 he appears as a guest on season 1, Episode 4 of Vanderpump Villa.

== College career ==
Knoxville became Smith's home away from home when he enrolled at the University of Tennessee in August 2007. It was on those campus' hardcourts that he became one of the most prolific athletes in Tennessee and Intercollegiate Tennis Association history, a four-time All-American, and made it to the college No. 1 ranking in both singles and doubles.

Coached by Sam Winterbotham and American former tennis star Chris Woodruff, Smith became a mainstay in the college top 10 in singles and doubles while helping the Volunteers to their best four-year period in program history. Smith played No. 1 in the singles and doubles lineups nearly his entire career. He was voted the Southeastern Conference Player of the Year in 2010 and 2011 as a junior and senior. As a team, Tennessee won the conference title both those years and reached the NCAA final in 2010. Smith eventually became the Vols' career combined wins leader with 298 (152 singles wins, 146 doubles wins).

He was consistently among the top tennis players year in, year out. He finished his career as the second player in college tennis history to earn singles and doubles ITA All-America honors all four years of his career, joining eventual world No. 1 doubles player Rick Leach of Southern California.

Smith enjoyed his best season as a junior in 2009–10. He swept the singles and doubles titles at the 2009 ITA All-American Championships, one of college tennis' "Grand Slams". His superb play during the fall's individual tournament season helped eventual propel Smith to the No. 1 national singles ranking on 17 April 2010. In addition to being ranked No. 1 in singles, he also held the No. 1 ITA national doubles ranking during portions of the 2009, 2010 and 2011 seasons. He was part of the ITA National Doubles Team of the Year with Davey Sandgren in 2009 and Boris Conkic in 2011. He reached the NCAA finals in doubles with Sandgren in 2010 and 2011.

One of Smith's major career accomplishments at Tennessee came off the court entirely. He earned his undergraduate degree in economics in May 2011. He was an academic award winner for the Vols, year in, year out. He earned an NCAA Postgraduate Scholarship and was a three-time ITA Academic Scholar Athlete.

=== 2011 SEC Athlete of the Year ===
A month after his college career ended, Smith became the first Vol since Peyton Manning in 1998 to be voted SEC Athlete of the Year by conference athletic directors. Other male athletes from Tennessee to earn this honor at the time included baseball star Todd Helton (1995) and football wide receiver Larry Seivers (1977).

== Professional career ==
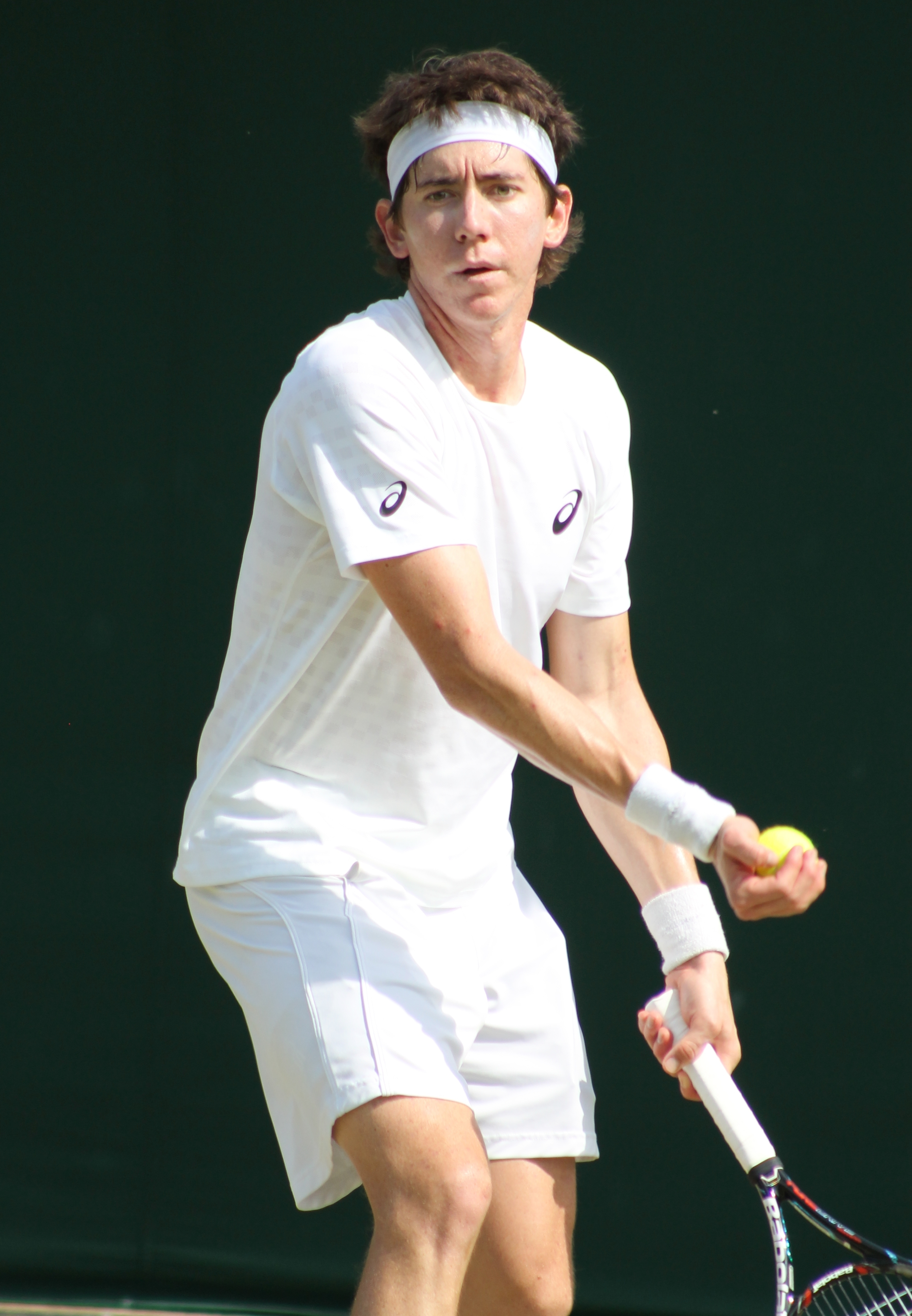
Smith in 2013

=== 2012 ===
In April, Smith won the US F11, defeating Pedro Zerbini 6–2, 6–0 in the final. In July 2012, Smith won the Winnetka Challenger against Ričardas Berankis 3–6, 6–3, 7–6 in the final. This was his first Challenger title, which he also had to qualify.

=== 2013 ===
In 2013, Smith competed mostly on the Challenger Tour. His first title came on 25 August at the Canada F6, where he defeated Ante Pavić 3–6, 6–4, 6–3 in the final. Smith also enjoyed a successful week in Tiburon; with his quarterfinal finish he vaulted 15 spots to a new career-high ranking of No.208.

=== 2014 ===
Smith made the second round of qualifying before losing to Denis Kudla in straight sets. He qualified for Indian Wells but lost in round one to Robin Haase.

Smith made the final of the Taipei Challenger, losing to Gilles Müller 3–6, 3–6. This increased his ranking to a career high of No. 181. He lost in the first round of Wimbledon qualifying to Farrukh Dustov. In the two Traralgon ATP Challenger events, Smith lost in the semifinal to Bradley Klahn in 1 and in the quarterfinal to Ben Mitchell in 2.

In December, Smith narrowly missed out on a wildcard into the 2015 Australian Open, losing in the final of the Australian play off to Jordan Thompson 1–6, 3–6, 6–1, 7–6, 7–9. Smith ended 2014 with a ranking of 201.

=== 2015: First ATP tour singles win and semifinal, Career-high ranking in singles ===
Smith commenced 2015 at the inaugural Onkaparina Challenger, but lost in round one to Marcos Baghdatis. He was eliminated in the second round of qualifying for the Australian Open to compatriot Omar Jasika 7–6, 3–6, 10–12. In February, Smith headed to USA where he made the quarter final of the Dallas Challenger. He then played and qualified for the Delray Beach main draw. This was the fourth ATP World Tour event for which he has qualified. He drew No.1 seed Kevin Anderson and lost in round one. Smith lost in round one of qualifying for Indian Wells before returning to the Challenger Tour, where he won the Drummondville Challenger over crowd favourite, Frank Dancevic. This was his second career Challenger title and first since 2012. This win gave Smith a near career high of 163. In June, Smith secured his first Grand Slam main-draw entry via qualifying for the first time in his career at Wimbledon. He lost in round one to Kenny de Schepper in five sets, despite leading 2–0 sets.

In July, Smith entered the Newport Championships and defeated compatriot and third seed Bernard Tomic in the first one, his first win on the ATP World Tour on the way to the semifinal where he lost to eventual champion Rajeev Ram.

At the US Open, Smith qualified before losing to Mikhail Youzhny in round one. He reached a career-high ranking of No. 108 on 28 September 2015. Smith ended 2015 with a singles ranking of No. 129.

=== 2016: Loss of form ===
Smith began 2016 with a wildcard into the 2016 Brisbane International. He lost in round one. Smith made the second round of qualifying at the Australian Open. In February, Smith qualified for Delray and defeated world No. 26 and No. 3 seed Ivo Karlović in round one. He lost to Juan Martín del Potro in round two. He lost in the qualifying rounds of Mexican Open, Indian Wells and Miami Masters. In April and May, Smith returned to the Challenger Circuit across Asia and Europe with limited success. In June, Smith lost in round one of Wimbledon qualifying. In July, Smith defeated compatriot Jordan Thompson in the first round of the Hall of Fame Tennis Championship, but lost to Marco Chiudinelli in round two. Smith lost in round one of US Open qualifying before returning to the Challenger Tour in USA and Australia in September, October and November. Smith ended 2016 with a singles ranking of No. 226.

=== 2017: First Grand Slam doubles quarterfinal ===
Smith began 2017 narrowly missing out on qualifying for 2017 Brisbane International and 2017 Australian Open, before playing a number of Challengers in North America. His best result being a semi-final result at Drummondville in March. In April, Smith travelled to Europe and lost in the first round of qualifying for the 2017 French Open and in June at the Surbiton Challenger before qualifying for and making the quarterfinals of the Nottingham Challenger. At Wimbledon, Smith lost in the last round of qualifying, 10–12 in the fifth set.

In August, Smith qualified for the Cincinnati Masters but lost to Richard Gasquet in round one. In September, Smith reached the doubles quarterfinals 2017 US Open partnering Nicholas Monroe.

=== 2018: First ATP World Tour doubles title ===
Smith commenced the season qualifying for the 2018 Brisbane International. He lost in round one to Mischa Zverev. Smith lost in the final round of qualifying for the Australian Open.

In March, Smith travelled to the U.S. and played on the Challenger Tour, reaching the final of the León Challenger in Mexico. In May, Smith lost in the qualifying for the French Open. In June, Smith qualified for and lost in round one of 2018 Wimbledon Championships.

In July, Smith won his first ATP World Tour doubles title in Atlanta Open partnering again with American Nicholas Monroe with whom he also reached earlier in February the final at the 2018 Delray Beach Open. Smith competed on the Challenger Tour for the rest of 2018 with limited success.

=== 2019: Australian Open mixed doubles final ===
In January 2019 John-Patrick Smith alongside fellow Australian Astra Sharma reached the final of the Australian Open mixed doubles. The most notable of their victories on this run came against second seeds Bruno Soares and Nicole Melichar in straight sets, before eventually losing 6–7, 1–6 to Barbora Krejčíková and Rajeev Ram in the final. John continued his form in men's doubles later in the year, making nine Challenger finals and winning the 2019 Challenger Eckental and 2019 Puerto Vallarta Open.

In December 2019, Smith won the Australian Wildcard Playoff to earn direct entry in singles into the 2020 Australian Open.

=== 2020–2021: Second Grand Slam doubles quarterfinal ===
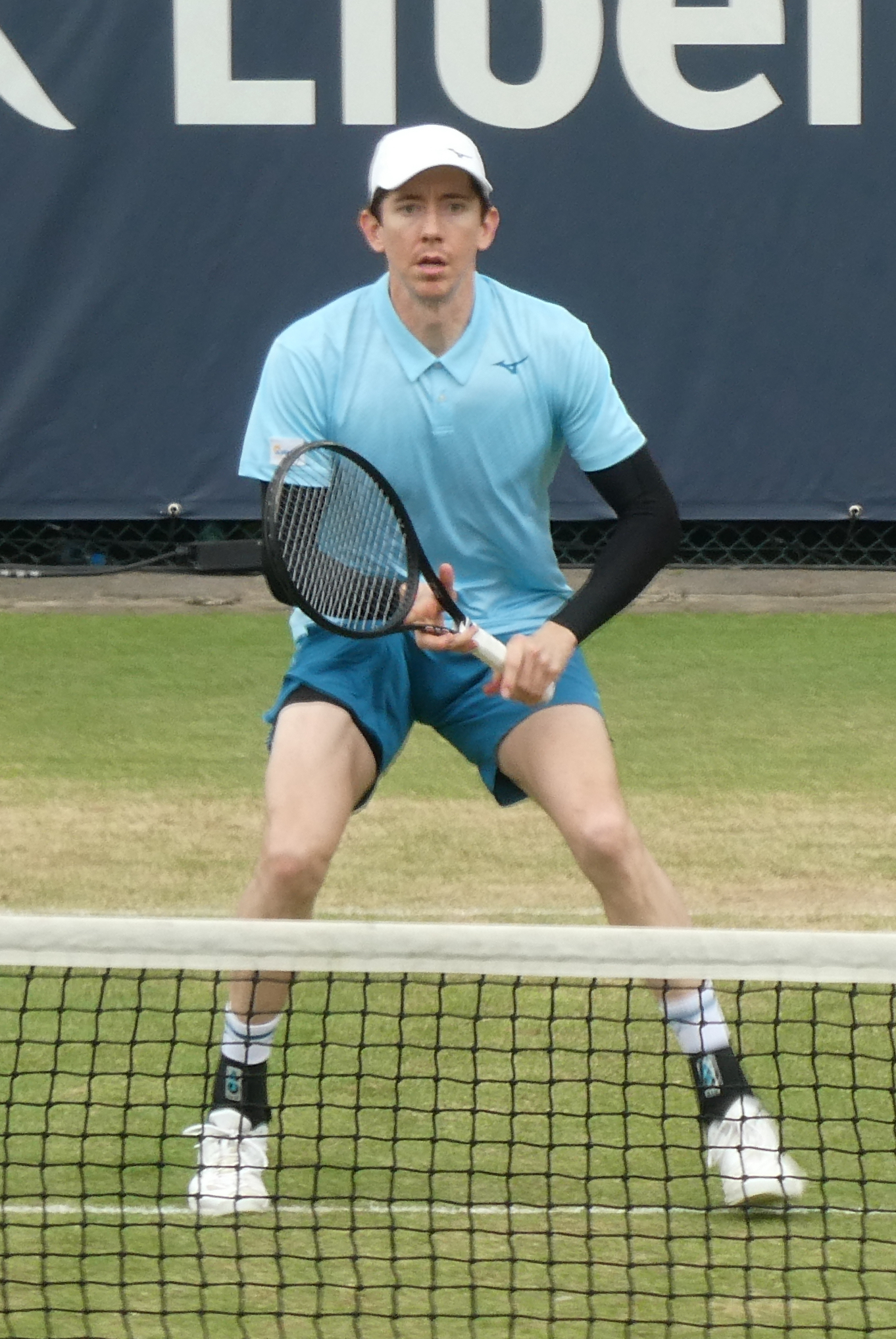
Smith at the 2024 Libéma Open

At the 2020 Australian Open he lost in the first round to Guido Pella. In the mixed doubles, he partnered again with Astra Sharma, and they reached the semifinals in Melbourne.

The following year, he reached the quarterfinals in doubles as a wildcard at the 2021 Australian Open partnering fellow Australian Matthew Ebden, his best showing at this major and only his second quarterfinal in doubles in his career.

=== 2025: Australian Open mixed doubles final ===
Partnering Kimberly Birrell, Smith reached the mixed doubles final at the Australian Open, losing to John Peers and Olivia Gadecki.

== Significant finals ==
=== Grand Slam tournaments ===
==== Mixed doubles: 2 (2 runner-ups) ====
Result	Year	Tournament	Surface	Partner	Opponents	Score
Loss	2019	Australian Open	Hard	(Australia) Astra Sharma	(Czech Republic) Barbora Krejčíková (United States) Rajeev Ram	6–7^{(3–7)}, 1–6
Loss	2025	Australian Open	Hard	(Australia) Kimberly Birrell	(Australia) Olivia Gadecki (Australia) John Peers	6–3, 4–6, [6–10]

== ATP Tour finals ==
=== Doubles: 6 (2 titles, 4 runner-ups) ===
Legend Grand Slam (0–0) ATP Finals (0–0) ATP Masters 1000 (0–0) ATP 500 (0–0) ATP 250 (2–4)	Finals by surface Hard (1–3) Clay (1–0) Grass (0–1)	Finals by setting Outdoor (2–3) Indoor (0–1)

Result	W–L	Date	Tournament	Tier	Surface	Partner	Opponents	Score
Loss	0–1	Jul 2017	Hall of Fame Tennis Championships, United States	ATP 250	Grass	(Australia) Matt Reid	(United States) Rajeev Ram (Pakistan) Aisam-ul-Haq Qureshi	4–6, 6–4, [7–10]
Loss	0–2	Feb 2018	Delray Beach Open, United States	ATP 250	Hard	(United States) Nicholas Monroe	(United States) Jack Sock (United States) Jackson Withrow	6–4, 4–6, [8–10]
Win	1–2	Jul 2018	Atlanta Open, United States	ATP 250	Hard	(United States) Nicholas Monroe	(United States) Rajeev Ram (United States) Ryan Harrison	3–6, 7–6^{(7–5)}, [10–8]
Loss	1–3	Feb 2021	Singapore Open, Singapore	ATP 250	Hard (i)	(Australia) Matthew Ebden	(Belgium) Sander Gillé (Belgium) Joran Vliegen	2–6, 3–6
Loss	1–4	Jan 2022	Maharashtra Open, India	ATP 250	Hard	(Australia) Luke Saville	(India) Rohan Bopanna (India) Ramkumar Ramanathan	7–6^{(12–10)}, 3–6, [6–10]
Win	2–4	Apr 2025	U.S. Men's Clay Court Championships, United States	ATP 250	Clay	(Brazil) Fernando Romboli	(Argentina) Federico Agustín Gómez (Mexico) Santiago González	6–1, 6–4

== ATP Challenger and ITF Futures finals ==
=== Singles: 11 (5 titles, 6 runner-ups) ===
Legend ATP Challenger Tour (2–4) ITF Futures (3–2)	Finals by surface Hard (4–5) Clay (1–0) Grass (0–0) Carpet (0–1)

Result	W–L	Date	Tournament	Tier	Surface	Opponent	Score
Win	1–0	Jul 2011	USA F19, Tulsa	Futures	Hard	(United States) Chris Wettengel	6–1, 6–0
Loss	1–1	Oct 2011	USA F26, Austin	Futures	Hard	(Canada) Peter Polansky	6–4, 6–7^{(5–7)}, 4–6
Loss	1–2	Oct 2011	USA F27, Mansfield	Futures	Hard	(United States) Jesse Levine	4–6, 3–6
Win	2–2	May 2012	USA F11, Vero Beach	Futures	Clay	(Brazil) Pedro Zerbini	6–2, 6–0
Win	3–2	Jul 2012	Winnetka, USA	Challenger	Hard	(Lithuania) Ričardas Berankis	3–6, 6–3, 7–6^{(7–3)}
Win	4–2	Aug 2013	Canada F6, Winnipeg	Futures	Hard	(Croatia) Ante Pavić	3–6, 6–4, 6–3
Loss	4–3	May 2014	Taipei, Chinese Taipei	Challenger	Carpet (i)	(Luxembourg) Gilles Müller	3–6, 3–6
Win	5–3	Mar 2015	Drummondville, Canada	Challenger	Hard (i)	(Canada) Frank Dancevic	6–7^{(11–13)}, 7–6^{(7–3)}, 7–5
Loss	5–4	Aug 2015	Vancouver, Canada	Challenger	Hard	(Israel) Dudi Sela	4–6, 5–7
Loss	5–5	Apr 2018	León, Mexico	Challenger	Hard	(United States) Christopher Eubanks	4–6, 6–3, 6–7^{(4–7)}
Loss	5–6	May 2019	Puerto Vallarta, Mexico	Challenger	Hard	(Austria) Sebastian Ofner	6–7^{(8–10)}, 6–3, 3–6

=== Doubles: 79 (37 titles, 42 runner-ups) ===
Legend ATP Challenger Tour (31–40) ITF Futures (6–2)	Finals by surface Hard (33–33) Clay (2–2) Grass (1–6) Carpet (1–1)

Result	W–L	Date	Tournament	Tier	Surface	Partner	Opponents	Score
Win	1–0	Jul 2011	USA F16, Innisbrook	Futures	Clay	(United States) Benjamin Rogers	(United States) Jeff Dadamo (United States) Austin Krajicek	7–6^{(7–3)}, 6–3
Win	2–0	Jul 2011	USA F19, Tulsa	Futures	Hard	(United States) Benjamin Rogers	(United States) Nick Papac (Czech Republic) Rudolf Siwy	6–2, 6–3
Win	3–0	Oct 2011	USA F25, Laguna Niguel	Futures	Hard	(United States) Benjamin Rogers	(Japan) Yaoki Ishii (Japan) Yuichi Ito	6–3, 7–6^{(7–3)}
Loss	3–1	Oct 2011	USA F26, Austin	Futures	Hard	(United States) Benjamin Rogers	(United Kingdom) Edward Corrie (United Kingdom) Chris Eaton	6–7^{(6–8)}, 2–6
Win	4–1	Feb 2012	Burnie, Australia	Challenger	Hard	(Australia) John Peers	(India) Divij Sharan (India) Vishnu Vardhan	6–2, 6–4
Win	5–1	Feb 2012	Caloundra, Australia	Challenger	Hard	(Australia) John Peers	(United States) John Paul Fruttero (South Africa) Raven Klaasen	7–6^{(7–5)}, 6–4
Win	6–1	Mar 2012	Canada F1, Gatineau	Futures	Hard (i)	(United States) Devin Britton	(Romania) Andrei Dăescu (Romania) Florin Mergea	5–7, 6–3, [10–5]
Win	7–1	Apr 2012	León, Mexico	Challenger	Hard	(Australia) John Peers	(Mexico) César Ramírez (Mexico) Bruno Rodríguez	6–3, 6–3
Win	8–1	May 2012	USA F11, Vero Beach	Futures	Clay	(United States) Benjamin Rogers	(United Kingdom) Edward Corrie (United States) Vahid Mirzadeh	5–7, 6–1, [11–9]
Loss	8–2	May 2012	USA F12, Orange Park	Futures	Clay	(United States) Benjamin Rogers	(United States) Phillip Simmonds (South Africa) Fritz Wolmarans	3–6, 7–6^{(7–5)}, [10–12]
Loss	8–3	Jul 2012	Winnetka, USA	Challenger	Hard	(Australia) John Peers	(United States) Devin Britton (United States) Jeff Dadamo	6–1, 2–6, [6–10]
Loss	8–4	Aug 2012	Vancouver, Canada	Challenger	Hard	(Australia) John Peers	(Belgium) Maxime Authom (Belgium) Ruben Bemelmans	4–6, 2–6
Win	9–4	Oct 2012	Belém, Brazil	Challenger	Hard	(Australia) John Peers	(United States) Nicholas Monroe (Germany) Simon Stadler	6–3, 6–2
Win	10–4	Nov 2012	Charlottesville, USA	Challenger	Hard (i)	(Australia) John Peers	(United States) Jarmere Jenkins (United States) Jack Sock	7–5, 6–1
Win	11–4	Feb 2013	Burnie, Australia	Challenger	Hard	(South Africa) Ruan Roelofse	(Australia) Brydan Klein (Australia) Dane Propoggia	6–2, 6–2
Win	12–4	Feb 2013	Australia F2, Mildura	Futures	Grass	(Australia) Sam Groth	(Australia) Colin Ebelthite (South Africa) Ruan Roelofse	6–3, 6–4
Win	13–4	Mar 2013	Rimouski, Canada	Challenger	Hard (i)	(Australia) Sam Groth	(Germany) Philipp Marx (Romania) Florin Mergea	7–6^{(7–5)}, 7–6^{(9–7)}
Loss	13–5	Apr 2013	Guadalajara, Mexico	Challenger	Hard	(Australia) Sam Groth	(Croatia) Marin Draganja (Croatia) Mate Pavić	7–5, 2–6, [11–13]
Loss	13–6	Apr 2013	Mexico City, Mexico	Challenger	Hard	(Australia) Jordan Kerr	(Australia) Carsten Ball (Australia) Chris Guccione	3–6, 6–3, [9–11]
Loss	13–7	May 2013	Anning, China, P.R.	Challenger	Clay	(Australia) Sam Groth	(Russia) Victor Baluda (Croatia) Dino Marcan	7–6^{(7–5)}, 4–6, [7–10]
Win	14–7	May 2013	Kunming, China, P.R.	Challenger	Hard	(Australia) Sam Groth	(Japan) Go Soeda (Japan) Yasutaka Uchiyama	6–4, 6–1
Loss	14–8	Jul 2013	Binghamton, USA	Challenger	Hard	(Australia) Adam Feeney	(United States) Bradley Klahn (New Zealand) Michael Venus	3–6, 4–6
Win	15–8	Sep 2013	Napa, USA	Challenger	Hard	(United States) Bobby Reynolds	(United States) Steve Johnson (United States) Tim Smyczek	6–4, 7–6^{(7–2)}
Win	16–8	Oct 2013	Sacramento, USA	Challenger	Hard	(Australia) Matt Reid	(United States) Jarmere Jenkins (United States) Donald Young	7–6^{(7–1)}, 4–6, [14–12]
Win	17–8	Nov 2013	Knoxville, USA	Challenger	Hard (i)	(Australia) Sam Groth	(Australia) Carsten Ball (Canada) Peter Polansky	6–7^{(6–8)}, 6–2, [10–7]
Win	18–8	Feb 2014	Burnie, Australia	Challenger	Hard	(Australia) Matt Reid	(Japan) Toshihide Matsui (Thailand) Danai Udomchoke	6–4, 6–2
Loss	18–9	Jul 2013	Irving, USA	Challenger	Hard	(New Zealand) Michael Venus	(Mexico) Santiago González (United States) Scott Lipsky	6–4, 6–7^{(7–9)}, [7–10]
Loss	18–10	May 2014	Taipei, Chinese Taipei	Challenger	Carpet (i)	(United States) Austin Krajicek	(Australia) Chris Guccione (Australia) Sam Groth	4–6, 7–5, [8–10]
Loss	18–11	May 2014	Gimcheon, Korea, Rep.	Challenger	Hard	(United States) Austin Krajicek	(Australia) Sam Groth (Australia) Chris Guccione	7–6^{(7–5)}, 5–7, [4–10]
Loss	18–12	May 2014	Busan, Korea, Rep.	Challenger	Hard	(United Kingdom) Jamie Delgado	(Thailand) Sanchai Ratiwatana (Thailand) Sonchat Ratiwatana	4–6, 4–6
Win	19–12	Aug 2014	Vancouver, Canada	Challenger	Hard	(United States) Austin Krajicek	(New Zealand) Marcus Daniell (New Zealand) Artem Sitak	6–3, 4–6, [10–8]
Win	20–12	Oct 2014	Sacramento, USA	Challenger	Hard	(Australia) Adam Hubble	(Canada) Peter Polansky (Canada) Adil Shamasdin	6–3, 6–2
Win	21–12	May 2016	Seoul, Korea, Rep.	Challenger	Hard	(Australia) Matt Reid	(China) Gong Maoxin (Chinese Taipei) Yi Chu-huan	6–3, 7–5
Win	22–12	Jul 2016	Winnetka, USA	Challenger	Hard	(United States) Stefan Kozlov	(United States) Sekou Bangoura (Republic of Ireland) David O'Hare	6–3, 6–3
Win	23–12	Jul 2016	Binghamton, USA	Challenger	Hard	(Australia) Matt Reid	(United Kingdom) Liam Broady (Brazil) Guilherme Clezar	6–4, 6–2
Loss	23–13	Aug 2016	Gatineau, Canada	Challenger	Hard	(Australia) Jarryd Chaplin	(France) Tristan Lamasine (Croatia) Franko Škugor	3–6, 1–6
Win	24–13	Oct 2016	Tiburon, USA	Challenger	Hard	(Australia) Matt Reid	(France) Quentin Halys (United States) Dennis Novikov	6–1, 6–2
Loss	24–14	Oct 2016	Stockton, USA	Challenger	Hard	(Australia) Matt Reid	(United States) Brian Baker (Australia) Sam Groth	2–6, 6–4, [2–10]
Win	25–14	Oct 2016	Traralgon, Australia	Challenger	Hard	(Australia) Matt Reid	(Australia) Matthew Barton (Australia) Matthew Ebden	6–4, 6–4
Loss	25–15	Nov 2016	Canberra, Australia	Challenger	Hard	(Australia) Matt Reid	(Australia) Luke Saville (Australia) Jordan Thompson	2–6, 3–6
Win	26–15	Nov 2016	Toyota, Japan	Challenger	Carpet (i)	(Australia) Matt Reid	(India) Jeevan Nedunchezhiyan (Indonesia) Christopher Rungkat	6–3, 6–4
Win	27–15	Feb 2017	San Francisco, USA	Challenger	Hard (i)	(Australia) Matt Reid	(China) Gong Maoxin (China) Zhang Ze	6–7^{(4–7)}, 7–5, [10–7]
Loss	27–16	Mar 2017	Drummondville, Canada	Challenger	Hard (i)	(Australia) Matt Reid	(Australia) Sam Groth (Canada) Adil Shamasdin	3–6, 6–2, [8–10]
Loss	27–17	Mar 2017	Guadalajara, Mexico	Challenger	Hard	(Australia) Luke Saville	(Mexico) Santiago González (New Zealand) Artem Sitak	3–6, 6–1, [5–10]
Loss	27–18	Jun 2017	Nottingham, Great Britain	Challenger	Grass	(Australia) Matt Reid	(United Kingdom) Ken Skupski (United Kingdom) Neal Skupski	6–7^{(1–7)}, 6–2, [7–10]
Loss	27–19	Nov 2017	Knoxville, USA	Challenger	Hard (i)	(United States) James Cerretani	(India) Leander Paes (India) Purav Raja	6–7^{(4–7)}, 6–7^{(4–7)}
Win	28–19	Apr 2018	Le Gosier, Guadeloupe	Challenger	Hard	(United Kingdom) Neal Skupski	(Belgium) Ruben Bemelmans (France) Jonathan Eysseric	7–6^{(7–3)}, 6–4
Loss	28–20	Apr 2018	León, Mexico	Challenger	Hard	(Australia) Bradley Mousley	(Ecuador) Gonzalo Escobar (Mexico) Manuel Sánchez	4–6, 4–6
Win	29–20	May 2018	Gimcheon, Korea, Rep.	Challenger	Hard	(South Africa) Ruan Roelofse	(Thailand) Sanchai Ratiwatana (Thailand) Sonchat Ratiwatana	6–2, 6–3
Loss	29–21	May 2018	Busan, Korea, Rep.	Challenger	Hard	(South Africa) Ruan Roelofse	(Chinese Taipei) Hsieh Cheng-peng (Indonesia) Christopher Rungkat	4–6, 3–6
Loss	29–22	Oct 2018	Calgary, Canada	Challenger	Hard (i)	(Australia) Matt Reid	(United States) Robert Galloway (United States) Nathan Pasha	4–6, 6–4, [6–10]
Win	30–22	Nov 2018	Champaign, USA	Challenger	Hard (i)	(Australia) Matt Reid	(Mexico) Hans Hach (Venezuela) Luis David Martínez	6–4, 4–6, [10–8]
Loss	30–23	Mar 2019	Drummondville, Canada	Challenger	Hard (i)	(Australia) Matt Reid	(United Kingdom) Scott Clayton (Canada) Adil Shamasdin	5–7, 6–3, [5–10]
Loss	30–24	Apr 2019	León, Mexico	Challenger	Hard	(Australia) Matt Reid	(Austria) Lucas Miedler (Austria) Sebastian Ofner	6–4, 4–6, [6–10]
Win	31–24	May 2019	Puerto Vallarta, Mexico	Challenger	Hard	(Australia) Matt Reid	(Ecuador) Gonzalo Escobar (Venezuela) Luis David Martínez	7–6^{(12–10)}, 6–3
Loss	31–25	Sep 2019	Cary, USA	Challenger	Hard	(Philippines) Treat Huey	(United States) Michael Mmoh (United States) Sekou Bangoura	6–4, 4–6, [8–10]
Loss	31–26	Sep 2019	Glasgow, Great Britain	Challenger	Hard	(United Kingdom) Jamie Murray	(Belgium) Ruben Bemelmans (Germany) Daniel Masur	6–4, 3–6, [8–10]
Loss	31–27	Oct 2019	Hamburg, Germany	Challenger	Hard (i)	(United Kingdom) Ken Skupski	(United States) James Cerretani (United States) Maxime Cressy	4-6, 4-6
Win	32–27	Nov 2019	Eckental, Germany	Challenger	Hard (i)	(United Kingdom) Ken Skupski	(Netherlands) Sander Arends (Czech Republic) Roman Jebavý	7–6^{(7–2)}, 6–4
Loss	32-28	Feb 2020	Cleveland, USA	Challenger	Hard	(Australia) Luke Saville	(Philippines) Treat Huey (United States) Nathaniel Lammons	5–7, 2–6
Win	33–28	Feb 2020	Cuernavaca, Mexico	Challenger	Hard (i)	(Australia) Luke Saville	(Spain) Carlos Gómez-Herrera (Japan) Shintaro Mochizuki	6–3, 6–7^{(4–7)}, [10–5]
Loss	33–29	June 2021	Nottingham, UK	Challenger	Grass	(Australia) Matthew Ebden	(Australia) Matt Reid (United Kingdom) Ken Skupski	6–4, 5–7, [6–10]
Loss	33–30	Mar 2022	Monterrey, Mexico	Challenger	Hard	(United States) Robert Galloway	(Mexico) Hans Hach Verdugo (United States) Austin Krajicek	0–6, 3–6
Loss	33–31	June 2022	Ilkley, UK	Challenger	Grass	(India) Ramkumar Ramanathan	(United Kingdom) Julian Cash (United Kingdom) Henry Patten	5–7, 4–6
Loss	33–32	Jul 2022	Winnipeg, Canada	Challenger	Hard	(United States) Max Schnur	(United Kingdom) Billy Harris (Canada) Kelsey Stevenson	6–2, 6–7^{(9–11)}, [8–10]
Loss	33–33	Aug 2022	Vancouver, Canada	Challenger	Hard	(Philippines) Treat Huey	(Sweden) André Göransson (Japan) Ben McLachlan	7–6^{(7–4)}, 6–7^{(7–9)}, [9–11]
Loss	33–34	Sep 2022	Cary, USA	Challenger	Hard	(Philippines) Treat Huey	(United States) Nathaniel Lammons (United States) Jackson Withrow	5–7, 6–2, [5–10]
Win	34–34	Nov 2022	Matsuyama, Japan	Challenger	Hard	(Australia) Andrew Harris	(Japan) Toshihide Matsui (Japan) Kaito Uesugi	6–3, 4–6, [10–8]
Loss	34–35	Jan 2023	Canberra, Australia	Challenger	Hard	(Australia) Andrew Harris	(Sweden) André Göransson (Japan) Ben McLachlan	3–6, 7–5, [5–10]
Loss	34–36	May 2023	Gwangju, South Korea	Challenger	Hard	(Australia) Andrew Harris	(United States) Evan King (United States) Reese Stalder	4–6, 2–6
Loss	34–37	Jun 2023	Ilkley, Great Britain	Challenger	Grass	(United States) Robert Galloway	(Ecuador) Gonzalo Escobar (Kazakhstan) Aleksandr Nedovyesov	6–2, 5–7, [9–11]
Loss	34–38	Sep 2023	Orléans, France	Challenger	Hard	(United Kingdom) Henry Patten	(Germany) Constantin Frantzen (Germany) Hendrik Jebens	6–7 ^{(5–7)}, 6–7 ^{(12–14)}
Loss	34–39	Oct 2023	Alicante, Spain	Challenger	Hard	(India) Jeevan Nedunchezhiyan	(India) Niki Kaliyanda Poonacha (India) Divij Sharan	4–6, 6–3, [7–10]
Loss	34–40	Oct 2023	Málaga, Spain	Challenger	Hard	(Australia) Andrew Harris	(United Kingdom) Julian Cash (United States) Robert Galloway	5–7, 2–6
Win	35–40	Nov 2023	Charlottesville, USA	Challenger	Hard	(Netherlands) Sem Verbeek	(United States) Denis Kudla (United States) Thai-Son Kwiatkowski	3–6, 6–3, [10–5]
Win	36–40	Nov 2023	Champaign, USA	Challenger	Hard	(Netherlands) Sem Verbeek	(United States) Lucas Horve (United Kingdom) Oliver Okonkwo	6–2, 7–6^{(7–4)}
Win	37–40	Aug 2024	Cary, USA	Challenger	Hard	(Australia) John Peers	(Greece) Petros Tsitsipas (Argentina) Federico Agustín Gómez	Walkover
Loss	37–41	Jun 2025	Nottingham, UK	Challenger	Grass	(Brazil) Fernando Romboli	(Mexico) Santiago González (United States) Austin Krajicek	6–7^{(2–7)}, 4–6
Loss	37–42	Jul 2026	Newport USA	Challenger	Grass	(Brazil) Fernando Romboli	(New Zealand) Finn Reynolds (New Zealand) James Watt	1–6, 7–6^{(7–2)}, [6–10]

== Performance timelines ==
Key
W	F	SF	QF	#R	RR	Q#	DNQ	A	NH

(W) winner; (F) finalist; (SF) semifinalist; (QF) quarterfinalist; (#R) rounds 4, 3, 2, 1; (RR) round-robin stage; (Q#) qualification round; (DNQ) did not qualify; (A) absent; (NH) not held; (SR) strike rate (events won / competed); (W–L) win–loss record.
To avoid confusion and double counting, these charts are updated at the conclusion of a tournament or when the player's participation has ended.

Current through the 2024 US Open.

=== Singles ===
Tournament	2012	2013	2014	2015	2016	2017	2018	2019	2020	2021	2022	2023	SR	W–L
Grand Slam tournaments
Australian Open	Q1	1R	Q1	Q2	Q2	Q3	Q3	Q1	1R	Q3	A	A	0 / 2	0–2
French Open	A	A	A	Q2	A	Q1	Q1	A	A	A	A	A	0 / 0	0–0
Wimbledon	A	Q1	Q1	1R	Q1	Q3	1R	Q2	NH	A	A	A	0 / 2	0–2
US Open	Q1	A	Q1	1R	Q1	1R	Q1	Q1	A	A	A	A	0 / 2	0–2
Win-loss	0–0	0–1	0–0	0–2	0–0	0–1	0–1	0–0	0–1	0–0	0–0	0–0	0 / 6	0–6
Career statistics
Overall win–loss	0–0	0–1	0–2	3–5	2–4	0–3	0–4	0–0	0–1	0–2	0–0	0–0	5–22	
Year-end ranking	244	221	201	129	226	219	193	307	313	394	-	1490	19%	

=== Doubles ===
Tournament	2012	2013	2014	2015	2016	2017	2018	2019	2020	2021	2022	2023	2024	2025	2026	SR	W–L
Grand Slam tournaments
Australian Open	1R	2R	1R	2R	1R	1R	1R	1R	1R	QF	1R	1R	2R	A	3R	0 / 14	8–14
French Open	A	1R	A	A	A	A	1R	1R	A	1R	A	1R	1R	3R	1R	0 / 8	2–8
Wimbledon	A	2R	2R	A	A	2R	1R	2R	NH	2R	2R	A	3R	2R	2R	0 / 10	10–10
US Open	A	1R	1R	A	A	QF	1R	1R	A	1R	A	A	2R	3R	1R	0 / 9	6–9
Win–loss	0–1	2–4	1–3	1–1	0–1	4–3	0–4	1–4	0–1	4–4	1–2	0–2	3–3	5–3	3–4	0 / 41	26–41
ATP 1000 tournaments
Indian Wells Open	A	A	A	A	A	A	A	A	NH	A	A	A	1R	SF	A	0 / 2	3–2
Miami Open	A	A	A	A	QF	A	A	A	NH	A	A	A	QF	A	SF	0 / 3	7–3
Monte-Carlo Masters	A	A	A	A	A	A	A	A	NH	A	A	A	A	A	A	0 / 0	0–0
Madrid Open	A	A	A	A	A	A	A	A	NH	A	A	A	1R	1R	A	0 / 2	0–2
Italian Open	A	A	A	A	A	A	A	A	A	A	A	A	1R	A	A	0 / 1	0–1
Canadian Open	A	A	A	A	A	A	A	A	NH	A	A	A	A	QF	A	0 / 1	2–1
Cincinnati Open	A	A	A	A	A	A	A	A	A	A	A	A	A	1R	A	0 / 1	0–1
Shanghai Masters	A	A	A	A	A	A	A	A	NH			A	1R	2R		0 / 2	1–2
Paris Masters	A	A	A	A	A	A	A	A	A	A	A	A	A	1R		0 / 1	0–1
Win–loss	0–0	0–0	0–0	0–0	2–1	0–0	0–0	0–0	0–0	0–0	0–0	0–0	2–5	6–6	3–1	0 / 13	13–13
Career statistics
Titles–Finals	0–0	0–0	0–0	0–0	0–0	0–1	1–2	0–0	0–0	0–2	0–1	0–0	0–0	1–1	0–0	2–7	
Overall win–loss	0–1	5–7	4–6	3–4	3–4	10–8	9–11	6–11	0–2	21–22	7–10	8–12	19–25	22–22	7–14	127–165	
Year-end ranking	103	73	82	261	79	68	81	92	105	68	85	78	71	41		44%	

=== Mixed doubles ===
Tournament	2013	2014	2015	2016	2017	2018	2019	2020	2021	2022	2023	2024	2025	2026	SR	W–L
Grand Slam tournaments
Australian Open	1R	1R	A	A	1R	1R	F	SF	1R	1R	QF	A	F	1R	0 / 11	13–11
French Open	A	A	A	A	A	A	A	NH	A	A	A	A	A	A	0 / 0	0–0
Wimbledon	A	A	A	A	1R	1R	A	NH	1R	A	A	A	A	A	0 / 3	0–3
US Open	A	A	A	A	A	A	A	NH	A	A	A	A	A	A	0 / 0	0–0
Win-loss	0–1	0–1	0–0	0–0	0–2	0–2	4–1	3–1	0–2	0–1	2–1	0–0	4–1	0–1	0 / 14	13–14
