= Danilo Petrović (tennis) =

Serbian tennis player

- Country (sports): Serbia
- Residence: Belgrade, Serbia
- Born: 24 January 1992 (age 33); Belgrade, Serbia
- Height: 2.03 m (6 ft 8 in)
- Turned pro: 2008
- Retired: 2022
- Plays: Right-handed (two-handed backhand)
- Coach: Alessandro Arena; Damjan Divjak
- Prize money: US $408,590

Singles
- Career record: 2–3
- Career titles: 0
- Highest ranking: No. 137 (19 October 2020)

Grand Slam singles results
- Australian Open: Q2 (2018)
- French Open: Q2 (2021)
- Wimbledon: Q1 (2018, 2021)
- US Open: Q2 (2018)

Doubles
- Career record: 1–0
- Career titles: 0
- Highest ranking: No. 205 (28 May 2018)

Team competitions
- Davis Cup: 1–0 (Sin. 0–0, Dbs. 1–0)
- Last updated on: 23 February 2025.

Danilo Petrović (Serbian Cyrillic: Данило Петровић, pronounced [dǎnilo pětroʋitɕ]; born 24 January 1992) is a Serbian former professional tennis player. He achieved a career-high ATP singles ranking of world No. 137 on 19 October 2020 and a career-high doubles ranking of world No. 205 on 28 May 2018. Petrović won two singles and two doubles titles on the ATP Challenger Tour.

== Professional career ==
=== 2018 ===
Petrović made his Davis Cup debut for Serbia in the 2018 Davis Cup World Group play-offs against India. Partnered with Nikola Milojević, he defeated Rohan Bopanna and Saketh Myneni in straight sets, securing Serbia a decisive 3–0 lead after the second day's play. Serbia went on to win the tie 4–0.

=== 2019 ===
He won his first Challenger title in Jerusalem by defeating Filip Peliwo in the final.

=== 2020 ===
Petrović achieved his best career result at the 2020 Forte Village Sardegna Open, which was only his second ATP Tour main-draw appearance. Entering the tournament as a lucky loser, he reached the semifinals before losing to former world No. 16 and 2018 French Open semifinalist Marco Cecchinato.

== Challenger and Futures finals ==
=== Singles: 27 (13 titles, 14 runner–ups) ===
Legend (singles) ATP Challenger Tour (2–2) ITF Futures Tour (11–12)	Titles by surface Hard (4–4) Clay (9–10) Grass (0–0) Carpet (0–0)

Result	W–L	Date	Tournament	Tier	Surface	Opponent	Score
Loss	0–1	Sep 2011	Serbia F10, Zlatibor	Futures	Clay	(Serbia) Ivan Bjelica	5–7, 2–6
Loss	0–2	Jun 2012	Serbia F2, Belgrade	Futures	Clay	(Hungary) Attila Balázs	2–6, 2–6
Win	1–2	Jul 2012	Serbia F3, Belgrade	Futures	Clay	(Austria) Maximilian Neuchrist	6–3, 6–0
Loss	1–3	Sep 2012	Serbia F10, Zlatibor	Futures	Clay	(Serbia) Ivan Bjelica	4–6, 6–3, 3–6
Loss	1–4	Feb 2013	Turkey F6, Antalya	Futures	Hard	(Spain) Jordi Samper Montaña	7–5, 2–6, 3–6
Loss	1–5	Jun 2013	Serbia F1, Belgrade	Futures	Clay	(Serbia) Miljan Zekić	6–7^{(3–7)}, 2–6
Loss	1–6	Jun 2013	Serbia F2, Belgrade	Futures	Clay	(Serbia) Miljan Zekić	1–6, 5–7
Loss	1–7	May 2014	Bosnia & Herzegovina F3, Brčko	Futures	Clay	(Serbia) Miki Janković	4–6, 6–7^{(3–7)}
Win	2–7	Jun 2014	Serbia F1, Belgrade	Futures	Clay	(Slovakia) Adrian Partl	6–4, 6–3
Loss	2–8	Aug 2014	Serbia F11, Zlatibor	Futures	Clay	(Serbia) Miljan Zekić	4–6, 2–6
Win	3–8	Jan 2015	Tunisia F2, El Kantaoui	Futures	Hard	(Italy) Salvatore Caruso	6–4, 6–4
Loss	3–9	Jun 2015	Serbia F2, Valjevo	Futures	Clay	(Germany) Nico Matic	4–6, 4–6
Win	4–9	Sep 2015	Serbia F11, Zlatibor	Futures	Clay	(Germany) Nico Matic	6–1, 6–2
Win	5–9	Sep 2015	Serbia F12, Niš	Futures	Clay	(Netherlands) Scott Griekspoor	6–3, 7–6^{(7–3)}
Win	6–9	Sep 2015	Serbia F13, Sokobanja	Futures	Clay	(Netherlands) Scott Griekspoor	2–6, 7–6^{(8–6)}, 7–6^{(7–4)}
Loss	6–10	Jan 2016	Kazakhstan F1, Aktobe	Futures	Hard (i)	(Russia) Evgenii Tiurnev	6–7^{(23–25)}, 3–6
Win	7–10	Mar 2016	Croatia F1, Rovinj	Futures	Clay	(Romania) Petru-Alexandru Luncanu	7–5, 7–5
Win	8–10	Jun 2016	Macedonia F1, Skopje	Futures	Clay	(France) Alexandre Müller	6–3, 4–6, 7–6^{(8–6)}
Win	9–10	Feb 2017	Kazakhstan F2, Aktobe	Futures	Hard (i)	(Poland) Andriej Kapaś	6–1, 6–7^{(2–7)}, 6–3
Loss	9–11	Mar 2017	China F3, Anning	Futures	Clay	(China) Wu Yibing	4–6, 6–7^{(6–8)}
Win	10–11	Apr 2017	Kazakhstan F4, Shymkent	Futures	Clay	(Czech Republic) Zdeněk Kolář	7–6^{(7–3)}, 6–3
Win	11–11	Mar 2018	Greece F1, Heraklion	Futures	Hard	(France) Yannick Jankovits	7–6^{(11–9)}, 6–2
Loss	11–12	Mar 2018	Greece F2, Heraklion	Futures	Hard	(Belgium) Maxime Authom	7–6^{(10–8)}, 3–6, 2–6
Loss	11–13	May 2018	Puerto Vallarta, Mexico	Challenger	Hard	(Spain) Adrián Menéndez Maceiras	6–1, 5–7, 3–6
Win	12–13	May 2019	Jerusalem, Israel	Challenger	Hard	(Canada) Filip Peliwo	7–6^{(7–3)}, 6–7^{(8–10)}, 6–1
Loss	12–14	Jun 2019	Milan, Italy	Challenger	Clay	(Bolivia) Hugo Dellien	5–7, 4–6
Win	13–14	Sep 2019	Sibiu, Romania	Challenger	Clay	(Australia) Christopher O'Connell	6–4, 6–2

=== Doubles: 31 (16 titles, 15 runner–ups) ===
Legend (doubles) ATP Challenger Tour (2–3) ITF Futures Tour (14–12)	Titles by surface Hard (4–3) Clay (12–12) Grass (0–0) Carpet (0–0)

Result	W–L	Date	Tournament	Tier	Surface	Partner	Opponents	Score
Loss	0–1	Sep 2011	Serbia F9, Novi Sad	Futures	Clay	(Serbia) Bojan Zdravković	(Mexico) Javier Herrera-Eguiluz (Australia) Marious Zelba	6–4, 6–7^{(5–7)}, [8–10]
Loss	0–2	Sep 2011	Serbia F10, Zlatibor	Futures	Clay	(Serbia) Bojan Zdravković	(Croatia) Duje Kekez (Bosnia and Herzegovina) Franjo Raspudić	4–6, 6–7^{(4–7)}
Loss	0–3	Jun 2012	Bosnia & Herzegovina F5, Kiseljak	Futures	Clay	(Canada) Milan Pokrajac	(Croatia) Marin Bradarić (Croatia) Mate Pavić	6–7^{(4–7)}, 6–7^{(7–9)}
Loss	0–4	Jun 2012	Serbia F1, Belgrade	Futures	Clay	(Canada) Milan Pokrajac	(Serbia) Nikola Čačić (Montenegro) Goran Tošić	4–6, 4–6
Win	1–4	Sep 2012	Serbia F10, Zlatibor	Futures	Clay	(Serbia) Miljan Zekić	(Serbia) Miki Janković (Serbia) Peđa Krstin	6–2, 4–6, [10–7]
Win	2–4	Apr 2014	Egypt F15, Sharm El Sheikh	Futures	Clay	(Serbia) Ilija Vučić	(Czech Republic) Libor Salaba (Austria) Thomas Statzberger	7–5, 6–3
Loss	2–5	May 2014	Egypt F16, Sharm El Sheikh	Futures	Clay	(Croatia) Antun Pehar	(Italy) Riccardo Bonadio (Italy) Pietro Rondoni	w/o
Loss	2–6	May 2014	Bosnia & Herzegovina F3, Brčko	Futures	Clay	(Serbia) Nikola Ćirić	(Serbia) Nikola Čačić (Serbia) Marko Tepavac	4–6, 6–1, [1–10]
Loss	2–7	Jun 2014	Serbia F3, Šabac	Futures	Clay	(Serbia) Ilija Vučić	(Chile) Guillermo Rivera Aránguiz (Chile) Juan Carlos Sáez	2–6, 4–6
Loss	2–8	Jul 2014	Serbia F4, Belgrade	Futures	Clay	(Serbia) Ilija Vučić	(Chile) Guillermo Rivera Aránguiz (Chile) Juan Carlos Sáez	5–7, 2–6
Win	3–8	Aug 2014	Serbia F9, Novi Sad	Futures	Clay	(Serbia) Ilija Vučić	(Croatia) Ivan Sabanov (Croatia) Matej Sabanov	6–4, 6–3
Loss	3–9	Aug 2014	Serbia F10, Novi Sad	Futures	Clay	(Serbia) Ilija Vučić	(Croatia) Ivan Sabanov (Croatia) Matej Sabanov	3–6, 6–3, [6–10]
Win	4–9	Aug 2014	Serbia F11, Zlatibor	Futures	Clay	(Serbia) Ilija Vučić	(Bulgaria) Dinko Halachev (Bulgaria) Plamen Milushev	2–6, 6–3, [10–7]
Win	5–9	Nov 2014	Greece F12, Heraklion	Futures	Hard	(Serbia) Ilija Vučić	(Greece) Alexandros Jakupovic (Russia) Markos Kalovelonis	7–5, 6–2
Loss	5–10	Apr 2015	Egypt F12, Sharm El Sheikh	Futures	Hard	(Serbia) Ilija Vučić	(Czech Republic) Roman Jebavý (Czech Republic) Libor Salaba	6–3, 3–6, [8–10]
Win	6–10	Apr 2015	Greece F5, Heraklion	Futures	Hard	(Serbia) Ilija Vučić	(Japan) Hiroyasu Ehara (Japan) Keisuke Watanuki	6–4, 6–7^{(5–7)}, [10–7]
Loss	6–11	May 2015	Greece F6, Heraklion	Futures	Hard	(Serbia) Ilija Vučić	(Greece) Alexandros Jakupovic (Greece) Stefanos Tsitsipas	3–6, 6–3, [7–10]
Win	7–11	Jun 2015	Bosnia & Herzegovina F4, Kiseljak	Futures	Clay	(Serbia) Ilija Vučić	(Australia) Steven de Waard (France) Jérôme Inzerillo	6–0, 6–2
Win	8–11	Jun 2015	Serbia F2, Valjevo	Futures	Clay	(Czech Republic) Libor Salaba	(Switzerland) Antoine Bellier (Australia) Aleksandar Vukic	7–6^{(9–7)}, 6–4
Win	9–11	Jul 2015	Serbia F5, Belgrade	Futures	Clay	(Serbia) Nebojša Perić	(Switzerland) Antoine Bellier (France) Maxime Janvier	7–5, 6–2
Win	10–11	Sep 2015	Serbia F11, Zlatibor	Futures	Clay	(Croatia) Nino Serdarušić	(Serbia) Luka Ilić (Serbia) Darko Jandrić	6–3, 6–7^{(3–7)}, [12–10]
Win	11–11	Sep 2015	Serbia F12, Niš	Futures	Clay	(Croatia) Nino Serdarušić	(France) Florent Diep (Germany) Pirmin Hänle	6–1, 6–2
Win	12–11	Mar 2016	Croatia F1, Rovinj	Futures	Clay	(Croatia) Nino Serdarušić	(Italy) Omar Giacalone (Italy) Pietro Rondoni	6–1, 7–5
Loss	12–12	Jul 2016	Macedonia F1, Skopje	Futures	Clay	(Serbia) Nebojša Perić	(North Macedonia) Tomislav Jotovski (Bulgaria) Aleksandar Lazov	3–6, 2–6
Win	13–12	Aug 2016	Qingdao, China	Challenger	Clay	(France) Tak Khunn Wang	(China) Gong Maoxin (China) Zhang Ze	6–2, 4–6, [10–5]
Win	14–12	Apr 2017	Kazakhstan F5, Shymkent	Futures	Clay	(Russia) Alexander Pavlioutchenkov	(Russia) Ivan Gakhov (Kazakhstan) Roman Khassanov	6–7^{(4–7)}, 6–0, [10–5]
Loss	14–13	Sep 2017	Banja Luka, Bosnia & Herzegovina	Challenger	Clay	(Serbia) Ilija Vučić	(Croatia) Marin Draganja (Croatia) Tomislav Draganja	4–6, 2–6
Loss	14–14	Feb 2018	Chennai, India	Challenger	Hard	(Turkey) Cem İlkel	(India) Sriram Balaji (India) Vishnu Vardhan	6–7^{(5–7)}, 7–5, [5–10]
Win	15–14	Mar 2018	Greece F1, Heraklion	Futures	Hard	(Hungary) Gábor Borsos	(Switzerland) Adrian Bodmer (Germany) Jakob Sude	5–7, 6–4, [10–6]
Win	16–14	May 2018	Puerto Vallarta, Mexico	Challenger	Hard	(Croatia) Ante Pavić	(Zimbabwe) Benjamin Lock (Brazil) Fernando Romboli	6–7^{(2–7)}, 6–4, [10–5]
Loss	16–15	May 2018	Mestre, Italy	Challenger	Clay	(Monaco) Romain Arneodo	(Croatia) Marin Draganja (Croatia) Tomislav Draganja	4–6, 7–6^{(7–2)}, [2–10]
