= Puerto Vallarta Open =

Professional Tennis Tournament

WTA 125
- Event name: Puerto Vallarta Open
- Founded: 2018
- Location: Puerto Vallarta, Mexico
- Venue: Parque Parota
- Surface: Hard / outdoors
- Website: WTA Website

Current champions (WTA 2025)
- Women's singles: (Romania) Jaqueline Cristian
- Women's doubles: (United States) Hanna Chang (United States) Christina McHale
WTA Tour
- Category: WTA 125
- Draw: 32S / 4Q / 8D
- Prize money: US$115,000 (2025)

The Puerto Vallarta Open was a professional tennis tournament played on outdoor hardcourts. It was a WTA 125 event that was held in Puerto Vallarta, Mexico in 2024 and in 2025. It was also part of the ATP Challenger Tour from 2018 until 2024. The city's tourism bureau gave its commitment to hold the men's tournament for five years.

== Past finals ==
=== Men's singles ===
Year	Champion	Runner-up	Score
2025	not held		
2024	(United States) Nishesh Basavareddy	(Canada) Liam Draxl	6–3, 7–6^{(7–4)}
2023	(France) Benoît Paire	(Japan) Yuta Shimizu	3–6, 6–0, 6–2
2022	not held		
2021	(Germany) Daniel Altmaier	(Chile) Alejandro Tabilo	6–3, 3–6, 6–3
2020	not held		
2019	(Austria) Sebastian Ofner	(Australia) John-Patrick Smith	7–6^{(10–8)}, 3–6, 6–3
2018	(Spain) Adrián Menéndez Maceiras	(Serbia) Danilo Petrović	1–6, 7–5, 6–3

=== Women's singles ===
Year	Champion	Runner-up	Score
2026	not held		
2025	(Romania) Jaqueline Cristian	(Czech Republic) Linda Fruhvirtová	7–5, 6–4
2024	(United States) McCartney Kessler	(Australia) Taylah Preston	5–7, 6–3, 6–0

=== Men's doubles ===
Year	Champions	Runners-up	Score
2025	not held		
2024	(Canada) Liam Draxl (Canada) Benjamin Sigouin	(United States) Karl Poling (United States) Ryan Seggerman	7–6^{(7–5)}, 6–2
2023	(United States) Robert Galloway (Mexico) Miguel Ángel Reyes-Varela	(Sweden) André Göransson (Japan) Ben McLachlan	3–0 ret.
2022	not held		
2021	(Netherlands) Gijs Brouwer (United States) Reese Stalder	(Mexico) Hans Hach Verdugo (Mexico) Miguel Ángel Reyes-Varela	6–4, 6–4
2020	not held		
2019	(Australia) Matt Reid (Australia) John-Patrick Smith	(Ecuador) Gonzalo Escobar (Venezuela) Luis David Martínez	7–6^{(12–10)}, 6–3
2018	(Croatia) Ante Pavić (Serbia) Danilo Petrović	(Zimbabwe) Benjamin Lock (Brazil) Fernando Romboli	6–7^{(2–7)}, 6–4, [10–5]

=== Women's doubles ===
Year	Champions	Runners-up	Score
2026	not held		
2025	(United States) Hanna Chang (United States) Christina McHale	(Australia) Maya Joint (Japan) Ena Shibahara	2–6, 6–2, [10–7]
2024	Iryna Shymanovich (Mexico) Renata Zarazúa	(Italy) Angelica Moratelli (Italy) Camilla Rosatello	6–2, 7–6^{(7–1)}
