= 2018 AON Open Challenger – Singles =

Singles
- 2018 AON Open Challenger

Final
- Champion: (Italy) Lorenzo Sonego
- Runner-up: (Germany) Dustin Brown
- Score: 6–2, 6–1

Events
Singles	Doubles
← 2017 ·	AON Open Challenger	· 2019 →

Stefanos Tsitsipas was the defending champion but chose not to defend his title.

Lorenzo Sonego won the title after defeating Dustin Brown 6–2, 6–1 in the final.

== Seeds ==
1. (France) Benoît Paire (withdrew)
2. (Slovakia) Martin Kližan (second round, retired)
3. (Italy) Paolo Lorenzi (second round)
4. (Poland) Hubert Hurkacz (quarterfinals)
5. (Argentina) Federico Delbonis (semifinals)
6. (Argentina) Guido Andreozzi (first round)
7. (Brazil) Thiago Monteiro (first round)
8. (Italy) Lorenzo Sonego (champion)

== Draw ==
=== Key ===
- Q = Qualifier
- WC = Wild card
- LL = Lucky loser
- Alt = Alternate
- SE = Special exempt
- PR = Protected ranking
- ITF = ITF entry
- JE = Junior exempt
- w/o = Walkover
- r = Retired
- d = Defaulted
- SR = Special ranking

=== Finals ===
Semifinals
5	(Argentina) Federico Delbonis	5	3
8	(Italy) Lorenzo Sonego	7	6
WC	(Germany) Dustin Brown	6	7^{8}
LL	(Brazil) Thomaz Bellucci	3	6^{6}

Final
8	(Italy) Lorenzo Sonego	6	6
WC	(Germany) Dustin Brown	2	1

=== Top half ===
First round
LL	(Peru) JP Varillas	6	5	3
(Italy) S Travaglia	4	7	6
(Italy) G Quinzi	6	4	3
(Croatia) V Galović	4	6	6
WC	(Italy) G Fonio	6	6
(Portugal) G Elias	4	2
(Brazil) R Dutra Silva	6	4	3
5	(Argentina) F Delbonis	4	6	6
4	(Poland) H Hurkacz	6	1	6
(Italy) A Arnaboldi	3	6	2
Q	(Hungary) Z Piros	4	1^{r}
(Argentina) JI Londero	6	4
Q	(Russia) A Avidzba	6	4	1
(Russia) A Vatutin	1	6	6
(France) S Robert	1	2
8	(Italy) L Sonego	6	6

Second round
(Italy) S Travaglia	6	6
(Croatia) V Galović	4	4
WC	(Italy) G Fonio	1	3
5	(Argentina) F Delbonis	6	6
4	(Poland) H Hurkacz	5	7	6
(Argentina) JI Londero	7	5	0
(Russia) A Vatutin	4	6	5
8	(Italy) L Sonego	6	4	7

Quarterfinals
(Italy) S Travaglia	3	6	6^{1}
5	(Argentina) F Delbonis	6	3	7^{7}
4	(Poland) H Hurkacz	6	3	6^{1}
8	(Italy) L Sonego	1	6	7^{7}

Semifinals
5	(Argentina) F Delbonis	5	3
8	(Italy) L Sonego	7	6

=== Bottom half ===
First round
6	(Argentina) G Andreozzi	5	6	0
WC	(Italy) A Basso	7	4	6
WC	(Germany) D Brown	6	7
(Spain) P Andújar	4	5
Q	(Italy) A Pellegrino	2	4
Alt	(Czech Republic) L Rosol	6	6
(Italy) S Caruso	2	6	4
3	(Italy) P Lorenzi	6	3	6
7	(Brazil) T Monteiro	3	4
(Chile) C Garín	6	6
(Italy) S Napolitano	4	2
Q	(India) S Nagal	6	6
LL	(Brazil) T Bellucci	7^{8}	6
(Italy) GM Moroni	6^{6}	3
WC	(Italy) F Baldi	0	2
2	(Slovakia) M Kližan	6	6

Second round
WC	(Italy) A Basso	2	7	2
WC	(Germany) D Brown	6	5	6
Alt	(Czech Republic) L Rosol	7^{7}	6
3	(Italy) P Lorenzi	6^{4}	3
(Chile) C Garín	3	6	6
Q	(India) S Nagal	6	3	4
LL	(Brazil) T Bellucci	3	7	4
2	(Slovakia) M Kližan	6	5	0^{r}

Quarterfinals
WC	(Germany) D Brown	3	6	7^{7}
Alt	(Czech Republic) L Rosol	6	4	6^{5}
(Chile) C Garín	6^{5}	4
LL	(Brazil) T Bellucci	7^{7}	6

Semifinals
WC	(Germany) D Brown	6	7^{8}
LL	(Brazil) T Bellucci	3	6^{6}
