= 2017 AON Open Challenger – Singles =

Singles
- 2017 AON Open Challenger

Final
- Champion: (Greece) Stefanos Tsitsipas
- Runner-up: (Spain) Guillermo García López
- Score: 7–5, 7–6^{(7–2)}

Events
Singles	Doubles
← 2016 ·	AON Open Challenger	· 2018 →

Jerzy Janowicz was the defending champion but chose not to defend his title.

Stefanos Tsitsipas won the title after defeating Guillermo García López 7–5, 7–6^{(7–2)} in the final.

== Seeds ==
1. (Germany) Jan-Lennard Struff (quarterfinals)
2. (Italy) Andreas Seppi (first round)
3. (Italy) Alessandro Giannessi (second round)
4. (Serbia) Laslo Đere (second round)
5. (Italy) Marco Cecchinato (first round)
6. (Argentina) Renzo Olivo (first round)
7. (Germany) Dustin Brown (second round)
8. (Hungary) Márton Fucsovics (semifinals, retired)

== Draw ==
=== Key ===
- Q = Qualifier
- WC = Wild card
- LL = Lucky loser
- Alt = Alternate
- SE = Special exempt
- PR = Protected ranking
- ITF = ITF entry
- JE = Junior exempt
- w/o = Walkover
- r = Retired
- d = Defaulted
- SR = Special ranking

=== Finals ===
Semifinals
WC	(Greece) Stefanos Tsitsipas	6	1
8	(Hungary) Márton Fucsovics	0	0^{r}
(Spain) Guillermo García López	6	6^{5}	6
(Italy) Stefano Napolitano	2	7^{7}	3

Final
WC	(Greece) Stefanos Tsitsipas	7	7^{7}
(Spain) Guillermo García López	5	6^{2}

=== Top half ===
First round
1	(Germany) J-L Struff	6	7^{7}
(Serbia) M Zekić	4	6^{2}
Alt	(Poland) H Hurkacz	6	2	5
(Belarus) U Ignatik	3	6	7
(Argentina) G Andreozzi	3	4
WC	(Greece) S Tsitsipas	6	6
(Bosnia and Herzegovina) A Šetkić	1	7^{7}	6
5	(Italy) M Cecchinato	6	6^{5}	3
4	(Serbia) L Đere	6	5	6
Q	(Italy) Gianluca Di Nicola	1	7	4
(Sweden) E Ymer	3	6^{4}
(Hungary) A Balázs	6	7^{7}
Q	(Germany) T Pütz	7^{7}	6
Alt	(Italy) F Gaio	6^{0}	1
(Italy) S Caruso	1	1
8	(Hungary) M Fucsovics	6	6

Second round
1	(Germany) J-L Struff	7^{8}	7^{7}
(Belarus) U Ignatik	6^{6}	6^{4}
WC	(Greece) S Tsitsipas	6	6
(Bosnia and Herzegovina) A Šetkić	2	4
4	(Serbia) L Đere	3	3
(Hungary) A Balázs	6	6
Q	(Germany) T Pütz	1	2
8	(Hungary) M Fucsovics	6	6

Quarterfinals
1	(Germany) J-L Struff	2	3
WC	(Greece) S Tsitsipas	6	6
(Hungary) A Balázs	7^{7}	2	5
8	(Hungary) M Fucsovics	6^{4}	6	7

Semifinals
WC	(Greece) S Tsitsipas	6	1
8	(Hungary) M Fucsovics	0	0^{r}

=== Bottom half ===
First round
6	(Argentina) R Olivo	5	2
(Russia) A Vatutin	7	6
Q	(Italy) A Pellegrino	3	4
WC	(Italy) M Donati	6	6
(France) J Eysseric	4	1
(Spain) G García López	6	6
WC	(Italy) J Ocleppo	5	1
3	(Italy) A Giannessi	7	6
7	(Germany) D Brown	7	6
Alt	(Italy) R Bonadio	5	2
(Italy) M Berrettini	4	6	2
(Italy) S Napolitano	6	3	6
(France) K de Schepper	2	2
(Slovakia) J Kovalík	6	6
Q	(Italy) A Basso	6^{1}	6	7^{7}
2/WC	(Italy) A Seppi	7^{7}	3	6^{4}

Second round
(Russia) A Vatutin	6	4	1
WC	(Italy) M Donati	2	6	6
(Spain) G García López	6	7
3	(Italy) A Giannessi	4	5
7	(Germany) D Brown	4	2
(Italy) S Napolitano	6	6
(Slovakia) J Kovalík	6	3	4
Q	(Italy) A Basso	3	6	6

Quarterfinals
WC	(Italy) M Donati	4	2
(Spain) G García López	6	6
(Italy) S Napolitano	7^{7}	6
Q	(Italy) A Basso	6^{2}	4

Semifinals
(Spain) G García López	6	6^{5}	6
(Italy) S Napolitano	2	7^{7}	3
