= 2018 AON Open Challenger =

- Date: 4–9 September
- Edition: 16th
- Surface: Clay
- Location: Genoa, Italy

Champions

Singles
- (Italy) Lorenzo Sonego

Doubles
- (Germany) Kevin Krawietz / (Germany) Andreas Mies
← 2017 ·	AON Open Challenger	· 2019 →

The 2018 AON Open Challenger was a professional tennis tournament played on clay courts. It was the sixteenth edition of the tournament which was part of the 2018 ATP Challenger Tour. It took place in Genoa, Italy between 4 and 9 September 2018.

== Singles main-draw entrants ==
=== Seeds ===
Country	Player	Rank^{1}	Seed
~~FRA~~	~~Benoît Paire~~	~~56~~	~~1~~
SVK	Martin Kližan	71	2
ITA	Paolo Lorenzi	94	3
POL	Hubert Hurkacz	109	4
ARG	Federico Delbonis	111	5
ARG	Guido Andreozzi	113	6
BRA	Thiago Monteiro	118	7
ITA	Lorenzo Sonego	121	8

- ^{1} Rankings are as of 27 August 2018.

=== Other entrants ===
The following players received wildcards into the singles main draw:

- (Italy) Filippo Baldi
- (Italy) Andrea Basso
- (Germany) Dustin Brown
- (Italy) Giovanni Fonio

The following player received entry into the singles main draw as an alternate:

- (Czech Republic) Lukáš Rosol

The following players received entry from the qualifying draw:

- (Russia) Alen Avidzba
- (India) Sumit Nagal
- (Italy) Andrea Pellegrino
- (Hungary) Zsombor Piros

The following players received entry as lucky losers:

- (Brazil) Thomaz Bellucci
- (Peru) Juan Pablo Varillas

== Champions ==
=== Singles ===
- (Italy) Lorenzo Sonego def. (Germany) Dustin Brown 6–2, 6–1.

=== Doubles ===
- (Germany) Kevin Krawietz / (Germany) Andreas Mies def. (Slovakia) Martin Kližan / (Slovakia) Filip Polášek 6–2, 3–6, [10–2].
