= 2022 AON Open Challenger – Doubles =

Doubles
- 2022 AON Open Challenger

Final
- Champions: (Jamaica) Dustin Brown (Italy) Andrea Vavassori
- Runners-up: (Czech Republic) Roman Jebavý (Czech Republic) Adam Pavlásek
- Score: 6–2, 6–2

Events
Singles	Doubles
- AON Open Challenger

Ariel Behar and Gonzalo Escobar were the defending champions but chose not to defend their title.

Dustin Brown and Andrea Vavassori won the title after defeating Roman Jebavý and Adam Pavlásek 6–2, 6–2 in the final.

== Seeds ==
1. (Monaco) Romain Arneodo / (Austria) Tristan-Samuel Weissborn (quarterfinals)
2. (Czech Republic) Roman Jebavý / (Czech Republic) Adam Pavlásek (final)
3. (Jamaica) Dustin Brown / (Italy) Andrea Vavassori (champions)
4. (Italy) Marco Bortolotti / (Spain) Sergio Martos Gornés (first round)

== Draw ==
Key

- Q = Qualifier
- WC = Wild card
- LL = Lucky loser
- Alt = Alternate
- ITF = ITF entry
- PR = Protected ranking
- SR = Special ranking
- SE = Special exempt
- JE = Junior exempt
- JR = Junior Accelerator Programme entrant
- CO = College Accelerator Programme entrant
- NG = Next Gen Accelerator Program entrant
- w/o = Walkover
- r = Retired
- d = Defaulted

First round
1	(Monaco) R Arneodo (Austria) T-S Weissborn	6	6
(Italy) Davide Pozzi (Italy) Augusto Virgili	0	1
(Ukraine) V Manafov (Ukraine) O Prihodko	6	1	[10]
(Germany) F Fallert (Germany) H Jebens	3	6	[6]
3	(Jamaica) D Brown (Italy) A Vavassori	6	6
I Liutarevich (Ukraine) V Uzhylovskyi	2	4
WC	(Italy) A Basso (Italy) G Ferrari	3	6	[2]
(Italy) S Napolitano (Italy) Alexander Weis	6	1	[10]
WC	(Italy) M Gigante (Italy) G Zeppieri	6^{0}	6	[10]
4	(Italy) M Bortolotti (Spain) S Martos Gornés	7^{7}	1	[7]
(Italy) R Brancaccio (Italy) F Passaro	4	6	[12]
(Italy) M Arnaldi (Italy) A Pellegrino	6	3	[10]
(France) M Martineau; A Vatutin	6	2	[6]
2	(Czech Republic) R Jebavý (Czech Republic) A Pavlásek	2	6	[10]

Quarterfinals
1	(Monaco) R Arneodo (Austria) T-S Weissborn	6	3	[11]
(Ukraine) V Manafov (Ukraine) O Prihodko	2	6	[13]
3	(Jamaica) D Brown (Italy) A Vavassori	4	6	[10]
(Italy) S Napolitano (Italy) A Weis	6	2	[8]
(Venezuela) LD Martínez (Slovakia) I Zelenay	4
WC	(Italy) M Gigante (Italy) G Zeppieri	1^{r}
(Italy) R Brancaccio (Italy) F Passaro	6^{3}	3
2	(Czech Republic) R Jebavý (Czech Republic) A Pavlásek	7^{7}	6

Semifinals
(Ukraine) V Manafov (Ukraine) O Prihodko	4	4
3	(Jamaica) D Brown (Italy) A Vavassori	6	6
(Venezuela) LD Martínez (Slovakia) I Zelenay	4	5
2	(Czech Republic) R Jebavý (Czech Republic) A Pavlásek	6	7

Final
3	(Jamaica) D Brown (Italy) A Vavassori	6	6
2	(Czech Republic) R Jebavý (Czech Republic) A Pavlásek	2	2
