= 2024 AON Open Challenger – Singles =

Singles
- 2024 AON Open Challenger

Final
- Champion: (Italy) Francesco Passaro
- Runner-up: (Spain) Jaume Munar
- Score: 7–5, 6–3

Events
Singles	Doubles
← 2023 ·	AON Open Challenger	· 2025 →

Thiago Seyboth Wild was the defending champion but lost in the first round to Andrea Picchione.

Francesco Passaro won the title after defeating Jaume Munar 7–5, 6–3 in the final.

== Seeds ==
1. (Brazil) Thiago Seyboth Wild (first round)
2. (Brazil) Thiago Monteiro (quarterfinals)
3. (Spain) Jaume Munar (final)
4. (Colombia) Daniel Elahi Galán (second round)
5. (Italy) Stefano Napolitano (first round)
6. (Italy) Francesco Passaro (champion)
7. (Peru) Juan Pablo Varillas (second round)
8. (Italy) Andrea Pellegrino (first round)

== Draw ==
Key

- Q = Qualifier
- WC = Wild card
- LL = Lucky loser
- Alt = Alternate
- ITF = ITF entry
- PR = Protected ranking
- SR = Special ranking
- SE = Special exempt
- JE = Junior exempt
- JR = Junior Accelerator Programme entrant
- CO = College Accelerator Programme entrant
- NG = Next Gen Accelerator Program entrant
- w/o = Walkover
- r = Retired
- d = Defaulted

=== Finals ===
Semifinals
(Italy) Stefano Travaglia	1	0^{r}
3	(Spain) Jaume Munar	6	3
(Peru) Ignacio Buse	6	3	4
6	(Italy) Francesco Passaro	2	6	6

Final
3	(Spain) Jaume Munar	5	3
6	(Italy) Francesco Passaro	7	6

=== Top half ===
First round
1	(Brazil) T Seyboth Wild	4	5
Q	(Italy) Andrea Picchione	6	7
(Italy) S Travaglia	6	6
(Italy) Samuel Vincent Ruggeri	3	2
(Italy) G Mager	5	6^{4}
Alt	(Slovakia) M Kližan	7	7^{7}
Q	(Croatia) M Poljičak	7	6
8	(Italy) A Pellegrino	5	2
3	(Spain) J Munar	1	4
Q	(Tunisia) M Echargui	6	4^{r}
WC	(Italy) F Bondioli	2	6	4
Q	(Switzerland) K Feldbausch	6	4	6
(Japan) K Nishikori	6	6
Q	(Australia) Matthew Dellavedova	4	4
WC	(Italy) G Cadenasso	6	5	1
7	(Peru) JP Varillas	4	7	6

Second round
Q	(Italy) A Picchione	4	4
(Italy) S Travaglia	6	6
Alt	(Slovakia) M Kližan	6	2	1
Q	(Croatia) M Poljičak	4	6	6
3	(Spain) J Munar	7	6
Q	(Switzerland) K Feldbausch	5	4
(Japan) K Nishikori	6	6
7	(Peru) JP Varillas	2	3

Quarterfinals
(Italy) S Travaglia	6^{6}	6	6
Q	(Croatia) M Poljičak	7^{8}	2	2
3	(Spain) J Munar	2	7	6
(Japan) K Nishikori	6	5	3

Semifinals
(Italy) S Travaglia	1	0^{r}
3	(Spain) J Munar	6	3

=== Bottom half ===
First round
5	(Italy) S Napolitano	4	6^{4}
(Italy) G Fonio	6	7^{7}
(Bulgaria) A Andreev	7	3	6
Q	(Argentina) GA Olivieri	5	6	2
WC	(Italy) J Berrettini	4	2
(Peru) I Buse	6	6
(Kazakhstan) D Popko	5	7	3
4	(Colombia) DE Galán	7	5	6
6	(Italy) F Passaro	6^{5}	7^{12}	6
(Italy) F Arnaboldi	7^{7}	6^{10}	2
(Peru) G Bueno	7	7^{8}
Alt	(Italy) Alexander Weis	5	6^{6}
(Lebanon) B Hassan	4	6	6
(Italy) F Maestrelli	6	2	3
(France) G Debru	5	3
2	(Brazil) T Monteiro	7	6

Second round
(Italy) G Fonio	7^{9}	1
(Bulgaria) A Andreev	6^{7}	0^{r}
(Peru) I Buse	7^{7}	7^{7}
4	(Colombia) DE Galán	6^{3}	6^{1}
6	(Italy) F Passaro	6	6
(Peru) G Bueno	3	2
(Lebanon) B Hassan	6	2	6^{2}
2	(Brazil) T Monteiro	4	6	7^{7}

Quarterfinals
(Italy) G Fonio	4	2
(Peru) I Buse	6	6
6	(Italy) F Passaro	4	6	7^{7}
2	(Brazil) T Monteiro	6	3	6^{5}

Semifinals
(Peru) I Buse	6	3	4
6	(Italy) F Passaro	2	6	6
