= 2024 AON Open Challenger – Doubles =

Doubles
- 2024 AON Open Challenger

Final
- Champions: (Lebanon) Benjamin Hassan (Spain) David Vega Hernández
- Runners-up: (Monaco) Romain Arneodo (France) Théo Arribagé
- Score: 6–4, 7–5

Events
Singles	Doubles
← 2023 ·	AON Open Challenger	· 2025 →

Giovanni Oradini and Lorenzo Rottoli were the defending champions but only Oradini chose to defend his title, partnering Giovanni Fonio. They lost in the first round to Victor Vlad Cornea and Denys Molchanov.

Benjamin Hassan and David Vega Hernández won the title after defeating Romain Arneodo and Théo Arribagé 6–4, 7–5 in the final.

== Seeds ==
1. (France) Grégoire Jacq / (Tunisia) Skander Mansouri (quarterfinals, withdrew)
2. (Monaco) Romain Arneodo / (France) Théo Arribagé (final)
3. (Netherlands) Sander Arends / (France) Jonathan Eysseric (first round)
4. (Romania) Victor Vlad Cornea / (Ukraine) Denys Molchanov (semifinals)

== Draw ==
Key

- Q = Qualifier
- WC = Wild card
- LL = Lucky loser
- Alt = Alternate
- ITF = ITF entry
- PR = Protected ranking
- SR = Special ranking
- SE = Special exempt
- JE = Junior exempt
- JR = Junior Accelerator Programme entrant
- CO = College Accelerator Programme entrant
- NG = Next Gen Accelerator Program entrant
- w/o = Walkover
- r = Retired
- d = Defaulted

=== Draw ===
First round
1	(France) G Jacq (Tunisia) S Mansouri	7^{10}	6
(Serbia) I Sabanov (Serbia) M Sabanov	6^{8}	3
(Lebanon) B Hassan (Spain) D Vega Hernández	6	2	[10]
Alt	(Italy) Simone Agostini (Italy) Stefano Reitano	3	6	[1]
3	(Netherlands) S Arends (France) J Eysseric	1	7	[7]
(Peru) G Bueno (Peru) I Buse	6	5	[10]
(Romania) A Jecan (Italy) Samuel Vincent Ruggeri	3	0
WC	(Italy) F Bondioli (Italy) G Cadenasso	6	6
PR	(Italy) J Ocleppo (Italy) A Pellegrino	3	6	[10]
(France) C Denolly (Ukraine) V Orlov	6	4	[8]
(Italy) G Fonio (Italy) G Oradini	4	4
4	(Romania) V Cornea (Ukraine) D Molchanov	6	6
PR	(Croatia) Z Babić (Ukraine) V Uzhylovskyi	3	0^{r}
WC	(Italy) F Maestrelli (Italy) F Romano	6	3
(Italy) S Napolitano (Italy) F Passaro	3	3
2	(Monaco) R Arneodo (France) T Arribagé	6	6

Quarterfinals
1	(France) G Jacq (Tunisia) S Mansouri
(Lebanon) B Hassan (Spain) D Vega Hernández	w/o
(Peru) G Bueno (Peru) I Buse
WC	(Italy) F Bondioli (Italy) G Cadenasso	w/o
PR	(Italy) J Ocleppo (Italy) A Pellegrino	4	6	[7]
4	(Romania) V Cornea (Ukraine) D Molchanov	6	3	[10]
WC	(Italy) F Maestrelli (Italy) F Romano	6	2	[3]
2	(Monaco) R Arneodo (France) T Arribagé	3	6	[10]

Semifinals
(Lebanon) B Hassan (Spain) D Vega Hernández	7^{8}	6
WC	(Italy) F Bondioli (Italy) G Cadenasso	6^{6}	3
4	(Romania) V Cornea (Ukraine) D Molchanov	7	2	[10]
2	(Monaco) R Arneodo (France) T Arribagé	5	6	[12]

Final
(Lebanon) B Hassan (Spain) D Vega Hernández	6	7
2	(Monaco) R Arneodo (France) T Arribagé	4	5
