= 2019 AON Open Challenger – Singles =

Singles
- 2019 AON Open Challenger

Final
- Champion: (Italy) Lorenzo Sonego
- Runner-up: (Spain) Alejandro Davidovich Fokina
- Score: 6–2, 4–6, 7–6^{(8–6)}

Events
Singles	Doubles
← 2018 ·	AON Open Challenger	· 2022 →

Lorenzo Sonego was the defending champion and successfully defended his title, defeating Alejandro Davidovich Fokina 6–2, 4–6, 7–6^{(8–6)} in the final.

== Seeds ==
All seeds receive a bye into the second round.

1. (Italy) Lorenzo Sonego (champion)
2. (Spain) Albert Ramos Viñolas (semifinals)
3. (Italy) Marco Cecchinato (second round)
4. (Germany) Philipp Kohlschreiber (quarterfinals)
5. (Spain) Roberto Carballés Baena (second round)
6. (Italy) Stefano Travaglia (quarterfinals)
7. (Spain) Jaume Munar (third round)
8. (Brazil) Thiago Monteiro (quarterfinals)
9. (Italy) Salvatore Caruso (second round)
10. (Argentina) Guido Andreozzi (semifinals)
11. (Spain) Alejandro Davidovich Fokina (final)
12. (Italy) Lorenzo Giustino (second round)
13. (Hungary) Attila Balázs (third round)
14. (Japan) Taro Daniel (quarterfinals)
15. (Belgium) Kimmer Coppejans (second round)
16. (Czech Republic) Jiří Veselý (third round)

== Draw ==
=== Key ===
- Q = Qualifier
- WC = Wild card
- LL = Lucky loser
- Alt = Alternate
- SE = Special exempt
- PR = Protected ranking
- ITF = ITF entry
- JE = Junior exempt
- w/o = Walkover
- r = Retired
- d = Defaulted
- SR = Special ranking

=== Finals ===
Quarterfinals
1/WC	(Italy) Lorenzo Sonego	6	6
6	(Italy) Stefano Travaglia	2	4
4/WC	(Germany) Philipp Kohlschreiber	6^{6}	3
10	(Argentina) Guido Andreozzi	7^{8}	6
11	(Spain) Alejandro Davidovich Fokina	6	6
14	(Japan) Taro Daniel	4	4
8	(Brazil) Thiago Monteiro	2	4
2	(Spain) Albert Ramos Viñolas	6	6

Semifinals
1/WC	(Italy) Lorenzo Sonego	6	5	6
10	(Argentina) Guido Andreozzi	2	7	4
11	(Spain) Alejandro Davidovich Fokina	3	6	6
2	(Spain) Albert Ramos Viñolas	6	2	3

Final
1/WC	(Italy) Lorenzo Sonego	6	4	7^{8}
11	(Spain) Alejandro Davidovich Fokina	2	6	6^{6}

=== Top half ===
==== Section 1 ====
First round
Q	(Italy) A Vavassori	6	5	1
(Germany) Y Hanfmann	4	7	6
(Chile) A Tabilo	6	6
(United Kingdom) J Choinski	0	2
(India) S Nagal	1	5
WC	(Italy) G Zeppieri	6	7
(Spain) T Robredo	2	6^{4}
(Argentina) F Bagnis	6	7^{7}

Second round
1/WC	(Italy) L Sonego	6	6
(Germany) Y Hanfmann	1	3
(Chile) A Tabilo	5	1
16	(Czech Republic) J Veselý	7	6
12	(Italy) L Giustino	3	2
WC	(Italy) G Zeppieri	6	6
(Argentina) F Bagnis	6	3	3
6	(Italy) S Travaglia	3	6	6

Third round
1/WC	(Italy) L Sonego	6^{6}	7^{7}	7
16	(Czech Republic) J Veselý	7^{8}	6^{0}	5
WC	(Italy) G Zeppieri	2	2
6	(Italy) S Travaglia	6	6

Quarterfinals
1/WC	(Italy) L Sonego	6	6
6	(Italy) S Travaglia	2	4

==== Section 2 ====
First round
(Slovakia) F Horanský	3	4
WC	(Italy) L Musetti	6	6
(Brazil) J Menezes	0	4
(Spain) B Zapata Miralles	6	6
(Austria) S Ofner	6	6
(Spain) G García López	2	2
(Germany) R Molleker	7	2	1
(Italy) F Baldi	5	6	6

Second round
4/WC	(Germany) P Kohlschreiber	6	6
WC	(Italy) L Musetti	4	4
(Spain) B Zapata Miralles	6	6
15	(Belgium) K Coppejans	2	4
10	(Argentina) G Andreozzi	4	6	6
(Austria) S Ofner	6	3	0
(Italy) F Baldi	7^{7}	1	6
5	(Spain) R Carballés Baena	6^{4}	6	1

Third round
4/WC	(Germany) P Kohlschreiber	7	7
(Spain) B Zapata Miralles	5	5
10	(Argentina) G Andreozzi	6	7
(Italy) F Baldi	3	5

Quarterfinals
4/WC	(Germany) P Kohlschreiber	6^{6}	3
10	(Argentina) G Andreozzi	7^{8}	6

=== Bottom half ===
==== Section 3 ====
First round
(Portugal) J Domingues	6	1	2
(Argentina) C Berlocq	4	6	6
(Italy) A Giannessi	0	0^{r}
(Croatia) V Galović	6	2
(Egypt) M Safwat	4	6	6
(Argentina) F Argüello	6	2	0
(Argentina) F Coria	6	7
(France) E Benchetrit	1	5

Second round
7	(Spain) J Munar	3	7^{7}	6
(Argentina) C Berlocq	6	6^{1}	4
(Croatia) V Galović	0	4
11	(Spain) A Davidovich Fokina	6	6
14	(Japan) T Daniel	6	5	6
(Egypt) M Safwat	3	7	4
(Argentina) F Coria	7^{7}	3	6
3	(Italy) M Cecchinato	6^{4}	6	4

Third round
7	(Spain) J Munar	6	4	3
11	(Spain) A Davidovich Fokina	4	6	6
14	(Japan) T Daniel	7^{7}	6
(Argentina) F Coria	6^{5}	4

Quarterfinals
11	(Spain) A Davidovich Fokina	6	6
14	(Japan) T Daniel	4	4

==== Section 4 ====
First round
(Brazil) R Dutra Silva	2	3^{r}
WC	(Italy) A Pellegrino	6	4
Alt	(Germany) J Lenz	5	4
(Italy) G Mager	7	6
Q	(Slovakia) A Molčan	6	7
Alt	(Brazil) T Bellucci	4	5
(Italy) F Gaio	7	7^{7}
(Argentina) P Cachin	5	6^{4}

Second round
8	(Brazil) T Monteiro	6	6
WC	(Italy) A Pellegrino	3	4
(Italy) G Mager	7^{7}	6
9	(Italy) S Caruso	6^{4}	2
13	(Hungary) A Balázs	3	6	6
Q	(Slovakia) A Molčan	6	3	3
(Italy) F Gaio	4	6	2
2	(Spain) A Ramos Viñolas	6	4	6

Third round
8	(Brazil) T Monteiro	4	6	6
(Italy) G Mager	6	4	4
13	(Hungary) A Balázs	1	3
2	(Spain) A Ramos Viñolas	6	6

Quarterfinals
8	(Brazil) T Monteiro	2	4
2	(Spain) A Ramos Viñolas	6	6
