= 2015 AON Open Challenger – Singles =

Singles
- 2015 AON Open Challenger

Final
- Champion: (Spain) Nicolás Almagro
- Runner-up: (Italy) Marco Cecchinato
- Score: 6–7^{(1–7)}, 6–1, 6–4

Events
Singles	Doubles
← 2014 ·	AON Open Challenger	· 2016 →

Albert Ramos-Viñolas was the defending champion.

== Seeds ==
1. (Spain) Albert Ramos-Viñolas (semifinals)
2. (Netherlands) Robin Haase (semifinals)
3. (Italy) Paolo Lorenzi (second round)
4. (Georgia (country)) Nikoloz Basilashvili (first round)
5. (Italy) Marco Cecchinato (final)
6. (Serbia) Dušan Lajović (first round)
7. (Spain) Nicolás Almagro (champion)
8. (France) Kenny de Schepper (first round)

== Draw ==
=== Key ===
- Q = Qualifier
- WC = Wild card
- LL = Lucky loser
- Alt = Alternate
- SE = Special exempt
- PR = Protected ranking
- ITF = ITF entry
- JE = Junior exempt
- w/o = Walkover
- r = Retired
- d = Defaulted
- SR = Special ranking

=== Finals ===
Semifinals
1	(Spain) Albert Ramos	6	1	4
5	(Italy) Marco Cecchinato	0	6	6
7	(Spain) Nicolás Almagro	3	6	6
2	(Netherlands) Robin Haase	6	1	4

Final
5	(Italy) Marco Cecchinato	7^{7}	1	4
7	(Spain) Nicolás Almagro	6^{1}	6	6

=== Top half ===
First round
1	(Spain) A Ramos-Viñolas	6	6
(Hungary) M Fucsovics	2	0
(Serbia) L Djere	3	4
(Argentina) H Zeballos	6	6
Q	(Croatia) A Šančić	2	3
Q	(Ukraine) A Smirnov	6	6
(Italy) S Caruso	6	2	6
8	(France) K de Schepper	3	6	1
3	(Italy) P Lorenzi	6	6
(Croatia) M Delić	2	4
(Italy) A Arnaboldi	2	6	3
(Italy) F Volandri	6	1	6
Q	(Chile) JC Sáez	4	2
(Bosnia and Herzegovina) A Šetkić	6	6
(Italy) A Giannessi	3	7	6^{5}
5	(Italy) M Cecchinato	6	5	7^{7}

Second round
1	(Spain) A Ramos-Viñolas	6	6
(Argentina) H Zeballos	2	2
Q	(Ukraine) A Smirnov	4	5
(Italy) S Caruso	6	7
3	(Italy) P Lorenzi	2	5
(Italy) F Volandri	6	7
(Bosnia and Herzegovina) A Šetkić	1	6^{1}
5	(Italy) M Cecchinato	6	7^{7}

Quarterfinals
1	(Spain) A Ramos-Viñolas	6	6
(Italy) S Caruso	4	4
(Italy) F Volandri	3	1^{r}
5	(Italy) M Cecchinato	6	2

Semifinals
1	(Spain) A Ramos-Viñolas	6	1	4
5	(Italy) M Cecchinato	0	6	6

=== Bottom half ===
First round
7	(Spain) N Almagro	6	6
(Czech Republic) J Šátral	4	4
WC	(Italy) Edoardo Eremin	6^{4}	6	7
WC	(Italy) L Giustino	7^{7}	3	5
(Czech Republic) A Pavlásek	7	6
WC	(Italy) A Basso	5	2
(Bosnia and Herzegovina) T Brkić	6	4	6
4	(Georgia (country)) N Basilashvili	2	6	4
6	(Serbia) D Lajović	6	4	5
(Switzerland) Y Marti	3	6	7
(Kazakhstan) A Golubev	7^{7}	7^{9}
WC	(Italy) G Mager	6^{4}	6^{7}
(Monaco) B Balleret	4	3
Q	(France) S Doumbia	6	6
(Italy) M Donati	2	2
2	(Netherlands) R Haase	6	6

Second round
7	(Spain) N Almagro	6	7
WC	(Italy) E Eremin	4	5
(Czech Republic) A Pavlásek	3	1
(Bosnia and Herzegovina) T Brkić	6	6
(Switzerland) Y Marti	3	4
(Kazakhstan) A Golubev	6	6
Q	(France) S Doumbia	6^{1}	3
2	(Netherlands) R Haase	7^{7}	6

Quarterfinals
7	(Spain) N Almagro	6	6
(Bosnia and Herzegovina) T Brkić	2	2
(Kazakhstan) A Golubev	3	6^{10}
2	(Netherlands) R Haase	6	7^{12}

Semifinals
7	(Spain) N Almagro	3	6	6
2	(Netherlands) R Haase	6	1	4
