= 2017 AON Open Challenger – Doubles =

Doubles
- 2017 AON Open Challenger

Final
- Champions: (Germany) Tim Pütz (Germany) Jan-Lennard Struff
- Runners-up: (Argentina) Guido Andreozzi (Uruguay) Ariel Behar
- Score: 7–6^{(7–5)}, 7–6^{(10–8)}

Events
Singles	Doubles
← 2016 ·	AON Open Challenger	· 2018 →

Julio Peralta and Horacio Zeballos were the defending champions but chose not to defend their title.

Tim Pütz and Jan-Lennard Struff won the title after defeating Guido Andreozzi and Ariel Behar 7–6^{(7–5)}, 7–6^{(10–8)} in the final.

== Seeds ==
1. (Austria) Julian Knowle / (Austria) Alexander Peya (first round)
2. (Czech Republic) Roman Jebavý / (Chile) Hans Podlipnik-Castillo (quarterfinals)
3. (Israel) Jonathan Erlich / (Spain) Guillermo García López (first round)
4. (Argentina) Guillermo Durán / (Spain) David Marrero (quarterfinals)

== Draw ==
=== Key ===
- Q = Qualifier
- WC = Wild card
- LL = Lucky loser
- Alt = Alternate
- SE = Special exempt
- PR = Protected ranking
- ITF = ITF entry
- JE = Junior exempt
- w/o = Walkover
- r = Retired
- d = Defaulted
- SR = Special ranking

First round
1	(Austria) J Knowle (Austria) A Peya	6	3	[5]
(Italy) S Caruso (France) J Eysseric	4	6	[10]
WC	(Italy) J Ocleppo (Italy) A Vavassori	3	3
(Germany) D Brown (Germany) A Mies	6	6
3	(Israel) J Erlich (Spain) G García López	6	6^{7}	[7]
(Hungary) A Balázs (Hungary) M Fucsovics	4	7^{9}	[10]
(Argentina) G Andreozzi (Uruguay) A Behar	6	7^{7}
(Netherlands) S Arends (United States) J Cerretani	1	6^{1}
WC	(Italy) M Berrettini (Italy) A Pellegrino	3	1
(Sweden) J Brunström (Slovakia) I Zelenay	6	6
(Belarus) A Bury (Sweden) A Siljeström	2	6^{4}
4	(Argentina) G Durán (Spain) D Marrero	6	7^{7}
(Monaco) R Arneodo (Argentina) R Olivo	2	4
(Germany) T Pütz (Germany) J-L Struff	6	6
WC	(Australia) A Popyrin (Greece) S Tsitsipas	6	3	[1]
2	(Czech Republic) R Jebavý (Chile) H Podlipnik-Castillo	3	6	[10]

Quarterfinals
(Italy) S Caruso (France) J Eysseric	6	4	[5]
(Germany) D Brown (Germany) A Mies	2	6	[10]
(Hungary) A Balázs (Hungary) M Fucsovics	5	4
(Argentina) G Andreozzi (Uruguay) A Behar	7	6
(Sweden) J Brunström (Slovakia) I Zelenay	7^{7}	7
4	(Argentina) G Durán (Spain) D Marrero	6^{3}	5
(Germany) T Pütz (Germany) J-L Struff	4	7^{7}	[10]
2	(Czech Republic) R Jebavý (Chile) H Podlipnik-Castillo	6	6^{2}	[3]

Semifinals
(Germany) D Brown (Germany) A Mies	3	7^{7}	[10]
(Argentina) G Andreozzi (Uruguay) A Behar	6	6^{5}	[12]
(Sweden) J Brunström (Slovakia) I Zelenay	4	5
(Germany) T Pütz (Germany) J-L Struff	6	7

Final
(Argentina) G Andreozzi (Uruguay) A Behar	6^{5}	6^{8}
(Germany) T Pütz (Germany) J-L Struff	7^{7}	7^{10}
