= 2010 AON Open Challenger – Doubles =

Doubles
- 2010 AON Open Challenger

Final
- Champion: (Germany) Andre Begemann (Germany) Martin Emmrich
- Runner-up: (United States) Brian Battistone (Sweden) Andreas Siljeström
- Score: 1–6, 7–6^{(7–3)}, [10–7]

Events
Singles	Doubles
← 2009 ·	AON Open Challenger	· 2011 →

For Tennis in Italy, at this professional tournament, Daniele Bracciali and Alessandro Motti were the defending champions; however, they didn't play together this year.

Bracciali played alongside James Cerretani, while Motti partnered with Walter Trusendi. These two pairs lost to Andre Begemann and Martin Emmrich in the quarterfinals (Motti/Trusendi) and semifinals (Bracciali/Cerretani). This 4th-seeded German pair went on to win the tournament, by defeating Brian Battistone and Andreas Siljeström 1–6, 7–6^{(7–3)}, [10–7] in the final.

== Seeds ==
1. (Italy) Daniele Bracciali / (United States) James Cerretani (semifinals)
2. (United States) Brian Battistone / (Sweden) Andreas Siljeström (final)
3. (Germany) Frank Moser / (Czech Republic) David Škoch (quarterfinals)
4. (Germany) Andre Begemann / (Germany) Martin Emmrich (champions)

== Main draw ==
=== Key ===
- Q = Qualifier
- WC = Wild card
- LL = Lucky loser
- Alt = Alternate
- SE = Special exempt
- PR = Protected ranking
- ITF = ITF entry
- JE = Junior exempt
- w/o = Walkover
- r = Retired
- d = Defaulted
- SR = Special ranking

=== Draw ===
First round
1	(Italy) D Bracciali (United States) J Cerretani	6	6
(South Africa) R de Voest (Chile) N Massú	4	4
(Russia) T Gabashvili (Germany) M Zverev	1	4
(Austria) J Ager (Austria) R Eitzinger	6	6
4	(Germany) A Begemann (Germany) M Emmrich	6	6
WC	(Italy) J Marchegiani (Italy) G Naso	2	3
WC	(Italy) A Guidotti (Italy) T Metti	1	1
(Italy) A Motti (Italy) W Trusendi	6	6
(Argentina) D Hartfield (Portugal) L Tavares	1	7	[10]
(Argentina) J-M Aranguren (Argentina) F del Bonis	6	5	[8]
(Argentina) G Durán (Chile) A García	1	7	[5]
3	(Germany) F Moser (Czech Republic) L Rosol	6	6^{7}	[10]
(Germany) G Kretschmer (Russia) A Kumantsov	7	6^{2}	[8]
(Italy) A Giannessi (Italy) F Piccari	6^{4}	7	[10]
WC	(Italy) F Fognini (Italy) A Giraudo	4	7	[8]
2	(United States) B Battistone (Sweden) A Siljeström	6	6^{2}	[10]

Quarterfinals
1	(Italy) D Bracciali (United States) J Cerretani	6	6
(Austria) J Ager (Austria) R Eitzinger	1	0
4	(Germany) A Begemann (Germany) M Emmrich	7	6
(Italy) A Motti (Italy) W Trusendi	6^{5}	3
(Argentina) D Hartfield (Portugal) L Tavares	7	6
3	(Germany) F Moser (Czech Republic) L Rosol	6^{5}	2
(Italy) A Giannessi (Italy) F Piccari	4	2
2	(United States) B Battistone (Sweden) A Siljeström	6	6

Semifinals
1	(Italy) D Bracciali (United States) J Cerretani	4	4
4	(Germany) A Begemann (Germany) M Emmrich	6	6
(Argentina) D Hartfield (Portugal) L Tavares	2	1
2	(United States) B Battistone (Sweden) A Siljeström	6	6

Finals
4	(Germany) A Begemann (Germany) M Emmrich	1	7	[10]
2	(United States) B Battistone (Sweden) A Siljeström	6	6^{3}	[7]
