= 2018 AON Open Challenger – Doubles =

Doubles
- 2018 AON Open Challenger

Final
- Champions: (Germany) Kevin Krawietz (Germany) Andreas Mies
- Runners-up: (Slovakia) Martin Kližan (Slovakia) Filip Polášek
- Score: 6–2, 3–6, [10–2]

Events
Singles	Doubles
← 2017 ·	AON Open Challenger	· 2019 →

Tim Pütz and Jan-Lennard Struff were the defending champions but chose not to defend their title.

Kevin Krawietz and Andreas Mies won the title after defeating Martin Kližan and Filip Polášek 6–2, 3–6, [10–2] in the final.

== Seeds ==
1. (Ukraine) Denys Molchanov / (Slovakia) Igor Zelenay (first round)
2. (Monaco) Romain Arneodo / (France) Jonathan Eysseric (first round)
3. (Belgium) Sander Gillé / (Belgium) Joran Vliegen (semifinals)
4. (Argentina) Federico Delbonis / (Argentina) Andrés Molteni (first round)

== Draw ==
=== Key ===
- Q = Qualifier
- WC = Wild card
- LL = Lucky loser
- Alt = Alternate
- SE = Special exempt
- PR = Protected ranking
- ITF = ITF entry
- JE = Junior exempt
- w/o = Walkover
- r = Retired
- d = Defaulted
- SR = Special ranking

First round
1	(Ukraine) D Molchanov (Slovakia) I Zelenay	6	3	[9]
(Germany) K Krawietz (Germany) A Mies	4	6	[11]
(Belarus) A Bury (Poland) H Hurkacz	6	6^{3}	[4]
(Argentina) G Andreozzi (Argentina) G Durán	4	7^{7}	[10]
4	(Argentina) F Delbonis (Argentina) A Molteni	6^{8}	7	[5]
(Italy) D Bracciali (Brazil) F Romboli	7^{10}	5	[10]
Alt	(Russia) I Gakhov (France) S Robert	3	7^{8}	[12]
(Italy) J Ocleppo (Italy) A Vavassori	6	6^{6}	[10]
(Brazil) R Dutra Silva (Brazil) T Monteiro	7^{7}	3	[8]
WC	(Italy) S Caruso (Italy) J Sinner	6^{2}	6	[10]
(Germany) A Begemann (Germany) D Brown	4	6^{4}
3	(Belgium) S Gillé (Belgium) J Vliegen	6	7^{7}
WC	(Italy) GM Moroni (Italy) S Travaglia	7^{7}	3	[10]
(Switzerland) L Margaroli (Austria) T-S Weissborn	6^{4}	6	[6]
WC	(Slovakia) M Kližan (Slovakia) F Polášek	6	6
2	(Monaco) R Arneodo (France) J Eysseric	4	4

Quarterfinals
(Germany) K Krawietz (Germany) A Mies	6	7^{7}
(Argentina) G Andreozzi (Argentina) G Durán	4	6^{4}
(Italy) D Bracciali (Brazil) F Romboli	7	6^{5}	[8]
Alt	(Russia) I Gakhov (France) S Robert	5	7^{7}	[10]
WC	(Italy) S Caruso (Italy) J Sinner	5	3
3	(Belgium) S Gillé (Belgium) J Vliegen	7	6
WC	(Italy) GM Moroni (Italy) S Travaglia	4	2
WC	(Slovakia) M Kližan (Slovakia) F Polášek	6	6

Semifinals
(Germany) K Krawietz (Germany) A Mies	6	7^{7}
Alt	(Russia) I Gakhov (France) S Robert	3	6^{3}
3	(Belgium) S Gillé (Belgium) J Vliegen	6	3	[7]
WC	(Slovakia) M Kližan (Slovakia) F Polášek	1	6	[10]

Final
(Germany) K Krawietz (Germany) A Mies	6	3	[10]
WC	(Slovakia) M Kližan (Slovakia) F Polášek	2	6	[2]
