= 2011 AON Open Challenger – Doubles =

Doubles
- 2011 AON Open Challenger

Final
- Champions: (Germany) Dustin Brown (Argentina) Horacio Zeballos
- Runners-up: (Australia) Jordan Kerr (United States) Travis Parrott
- Score: 6–2, 7–5

Events
Singles	Doubles
← 2010 ·	AON Open Challenger	· 2012 →

Andre Begemann and Martin Emmrich were the defending champions, but decided not to participate.

Dustin Brown and Horacio Zeballos claimed the title. They defeated Jordan Kerr and Travis Parrott 6–2, 7–5 in the final.

== Seeds ==
1. (Germany) Dustin Brown / (Argentina) Horacio Zeballos (champions)
2. (Sweden) Johan Brunström / (Czech Republic) David Škoch (first round)
3. (Australia) Jordan Kerr / (United States) Travis Parrott (final)
4. (Australia) Colin Ebelthite / (Australia) Adam Feeney (first round)

== Draw ==
=== Key ===
- Q = Qualifier
- WC = Wild card
- LL = Lucky loser
- Alt = Alternate
- SE = Special exempt
- PR = Protected ranking
- ITF = ITF entry
- JE = Junior exempt
- w/o = Walkover
- r = Retired
- d = Defaulted
- SR = Special ranking

=== Draw ===
First round
1	(Germany) D Brown (Argentina) H Zeballos	6	6
WC	(Italy) A Basso (Italy) Francesco Picco	3	2
(Italy) T Fabbiano (Italy) S Ianni	6	6
(Italy) A Motti (Italy) W Trusendi	3	2
4	(Australia) C Ebelthite (Australia) A Feeney	5	6^{6}
Alt	(Italy) O Giacalone (Italy) G Naso	7	7^{8}
(Argentina) G Durán (Croatia) K Mesaroš	3	1
(Italy) M Crugnola (Italy) A di Mauro	6	6
WC	(Italy) Edoardo Eremin (Kazakhstan) A Golubev	6	7^{7}
(Austria) M Linzer (Finland) T Nieminen	2	6^{5}
WC	(Italy) Ettore Damiani (Italy) Tommaso Metti	1	2
3	(Australia) J Kerr (United States) T Parrott	6	6
(Italy) S Galvani (Germany) M Zverev	7^{7}	0	[10]
(Argentina) D Junqueira (Argentina) L Mayer	6^{3}	6	[2]
(Italy) A Giannessi (Denmark) F Nielsen	6^{4}	6	[10]
2	(Sweden) J Brunström (Czech Republic) D Škoch	7^{7}	2	[8]

Quarterfinals
1	(Germany) D Brown (Argentina) H Zeballos	7^{11}	6
(Italy) T Fabbiano (Italy) S Ianni	6^{9}	3
(Italy) O Giacalone (Italy) G Naso	2	6^{4}
(Italy) M Crugnola (Italy) A di Mauro	6	7^{7}
WC	(Italy) E Eremin (Kazakhstan) A Golubev	1	3
3	(Australia) J Kerr (United States) T Parrott	6	6
(Italy) S Galvani (Germany) M Zverev	4	2
(Italy) A Giannessi (Denmark) F Nielsen	6	6

Semifinals
1	(Germany) D Brown (Argentina) H Zeballos	6	6^{7}	[10]
(Italy) M Crugnola (Italy) A di Mauro	4	7^{9}	[8]
3	(Australia) J Kerr (United States) T Parrott	7^{7}	6
(Italy) A Giannessi (Denmark) F Nielsen	6^{4}	2

Final
1	(Germany) D Brown (Argentina) H Zeballos	6	7
3	(Australia) J Kerr (United States) T Parrott	2	5
