= 2017 AON Open Challenger =

- Date: 5–10 September
- Edition: 15th
- Surface: Clay
- Location: Genoa, Italy

Champions

Singles
- (Greece) Stefanos Tsitsipas

Doubles
- (Germany) Tim Pütz / (Germany) Jan-Lennard Struff
← 2016 ·	AON Open Challenger	· 2018 →

The 2017 AON Open Challenger was a professional tennis tournament played on clay courts. It was the fifteenth edition of the tournament which was part of the 2017 ATP Challenger Tour. It took place in Genoa, Italy between 5 and 10 September 2017.

== Singles main-draw entrants ==
=== Seeds ===
Country	Player	Rank^{1}	Seed
GER	Jan-Lennard Struff	49	1
ITA	Andreas Seppi	81	2
ITA	Alessandro Giannessi	91	3
SRB	Laslo Đere	98	4
ITA	Marco Cecchinato	102	5
ARG	Renzo Olivo	114	6
GER	Dustin Brown	116	7
HUN	Márton Fucsovics	117	8

- ^{1} Rankings are as of 28 August 2017.

=== Other entrants ===
The following players received wildcards into the singles main draw:

- (Italy) Matteo Donati
- (Italy) Julian Ocleppo
- (Italy) Andreas Seppi
- (Greece) Stefanos Tsitsipas

The following players received entry into the singles main draw as alternates:

- (Italy) Riccardo Bonadio
- (Italy) Federico Gaio
- (Poland) Hubert Hurkacz

The following players received entry from the qualifying draw:

- (Italy) Andrea Basso
- (Italy) Gianluca Di Nicola
- (Italy) Andrea Pellegrino
- (Germany) Tim Pütz

== Champions ==
=== Singles ===
- (Greece) Stefanos Tsitsipas def. (Spain) Guillermo García López 7–5, 7–6^{(7–2)}.

=== Doubles ===
- (Germany) Tim Pütz / (Germany) Jan-Lennard Struff def. (Argentina) Guido Andreozzi / (Uruguay) Ariel Behar 7–6^{(7–5)}, 7–6^{(10–8)}.
