= 2012 AON Open Challenger – Doubles =

2012 tennis matches

Doubles
- 2012 AON Open Challenger

Final
- Champions: (Germany) Andre Begemann (Germany) Martin Emmrich
- Runners-up: (Germany) Dominik Meffert (Austria) Philipp Oswald
- Score: 6–3, 6–1

Events
Singles	Doubles
← 2011 ·	AON Open Challenger	· 2013 →

Dustin Brown and Horacio Zeballos were the defending champions but Zeballos decided not to participate.
Brown played alongside Lukáš Dlouhý, losing in the first round.
Andre Begemann and Martin Emmrich won the title, defeating Dominik Meffert and Philipp Oswald 6–3, 6–1 in the final.

== Seeds ==
1. (Sweden) Johan Brunström / (Denmark) Frederik Nielsen (quarterfinals)
2. (Germany) Dustin Brown / (Czech Republic) Lukáš Dlouhý (first round)
3. (Germany) Andre Begemann / (Germany) Martin Emmrich (champions)
4. (Poland) Tomasz Bednarek / (Poland) Mateusz Kowalczyk (quarterfinals)

== Draw ==
=== Key ===
- Q = Qualifier
- WC = Wild card
- LL = Lucky loser
- Alt = Alternate
- ITF = ITF entry
- PR = Protected ranking
- SR = Special ranking
- SE = Special exempt
- JE = Junior exempt
- JR = Junior Accelerator Programme entrant
- CO = College Accelerator Programme entrant
- NG = Next Gen Accelerator Program entrant
- w/o = Walkover
- r = Retired
- d = Defaulted

=== Draw ===
First round
1	(Sweden) J Brunström (Denmark) F Nielsen	6	6
(Croatia) M Draganja (Croatia) L Zovko	2	4
(Chile) P Capdeville (Italy) A Motti	6^{0}	3
(Germany) D Meffert (Austria) P Oswald	7^{7}	6
4	(Poland) T Bednarek (Poland) M Kowalczyk	4	6	[10]
(Argentina) G Andreozzi (Argentina) R Olivo	6	3	[4]
(Slovakia) P Červenák (Czech Republic) L Rosol	3	4
WC	(Italy) A Basso (France) S Robert	6	6
(Australia) C Ebelthite (Czech Republic) J Pospíšil	4	4
WC	(Italy) T Fabbiano (Italy) W Trusendi	6	6
(Italy) A Giannessi (Italy) G Naso	6^{5}	4
3	(Germany) A Begemann (Germany) M Emmrich	7^{7}	6
(Canada) A Shamasdin (Slovakia) I Zelenay	3	6	[10]
WC	(Italy) Enrico Burzi (Italy) Francesco Picco	6	2	[7]
(Italy) S Ianni (Italy) S Vagnozzi	7^{7}	7
2	(Germany) D Brown (Czech Republic) L Dlouhý	6^{5}	5

Quarterfinals
1	(Sweden) J Brunström (Denmark) F Nielsen	3	6	[8]
(Germany) D Meffert (Austria) P Oswald	6	3	[10]
4	(Poland) T Bednarek (Poland) M Kowalczyk	6	4	[7]
WC	(Italy) A Basso (France) S Robert	3	6	[10]
WC	(Italy) T Fabbiano (Italy) W Trusendi	4	4
3	(Germany) A Begemann (Germany) M Emmrich	6	6
(Canada) A Shamasdin (Slovakia) I Zelenay	2	6	[10]
(Italy) S Ianni (Italy) S Vagnozzi	6	3	[5]

Semifinals
(Germany) D Meffert (Austria) P Oswald	6^{3}	6	[10]
WC	(Italy) A Basso (France) S Robert	7^{7}	4	[7]
3	(Germany) A Begemann (Germany) M Emmrich	7^{7}	4	[10]
(Canada) A Shamasdin (Slovakia) I Zelenay	6^{5}	6	[8]

Final
(Germany) D Meffert (Austria) P Oswald	3	1
3	(Germany) A Begemann (Germany) M Emmrich	6	6
