= 2024 AON Open Challenger =

- Date: 2–8 September
- Edition: 20th
- Surface: Clay
- Location: Genoa, Italy

Champions

Singles
- (Italy) Francesco Passaro

Doubles
- (Lebanon) Benjamin Hassan / (Spain) David Vega Hernández
← 2023 ·	AON Open Challenger	· 2025 →

The 2024 AON Open Challenger was a professional tennis tournament played on clay courts. It was the 20th edition of the tournament which was part of the 2024 ATP Challenger Tour. It took place in Genoa, Italy between 2 and 8 September 2024.

== Singles main-draw entrants ==
=== Seeds ===
Country	Player	Rank^{1}	Seed
BRA	Thiago Seyboth Wild	68	1
BRA	Thiago Monteiro	75	2
ESP	Jaume Munar	84	3
COL	Daniel Elahi Galán	127	4
ITA	Stefano Napolitano	135	5
ITA	Francesco Passaro	145	6
PER	Juan Pablo Varillas	157	7
ITA	Andrea Pellegrino	170	8

- ^{1} Rankings are as of 26 August 2024.

=== Other entrants ===
The following players received wildcards into the singles main draw:

- (Italy) Jacopo Berrettini
- (Italy) Federico Bondioli
- (Italy) Gianluca Cadenasso

The following players received entry into the singles main draw as alternates:

- (Slovakia) Martin Kližan
- (Italy) Alexander Weis

The following players received entry from the qualifying draw:

- (Australia) Matthew Dellavedova
- (Tunisia) Moez Echargui
- (Switzerland) Kilian Feldbausch
- (Argentina) Genaro Alberto Olivieri
- (Italy) Andrea Picchione
- (Croatia) Mili Poljičak

== Champions ==
=== Singles ===
- (Italy) Francesco Passaro def. (Spain) Jaume Munar 7–5, 6–3.

=== Doubles ===
- (Lebanon) Benjamin Hassan / (Spain) David Vega Hernández def. (Monaco) Romain Arneodo / (France) Théo Arribagé 6–4, 7–5.
