= 2016 AON Open Challenger – Doubles =

Doubles
- 2016 AON Open Challenger

Final
- Champions: (Chile) Julio Peralta (Argentina) Horacio Zeballos
- Runners-up: (Belarus) Aliaksandr Bury (Belarus) Andrei Vasilevski
- Score: 6–4, 6–3

Events
Singles	Doubles
← 2015 ·	AON Open Challenger	· 2017 →

Guillermo Durán and Horacio Zeballos were the defending champions but chose to participate with different partners. Durán played alongside Andrés Molteni while Zeballos played with Julio Peralta. Durán lost in the first round to Andrea Arnaboldi and Ramkumar Ramanathan.

Zealous successfully defended his title, defeating Aliaksandr Bury and Andrei Vasilevski 6–4, 6–3 in the final.

== Seeds ==
1. (Chile) Julio Peralta / (Argentina) Horacio Zeballos (champions)
2. (Argentina) Guillermo Durán / (Argentina) Andrés Molteni (first round)
3. (Sweden) Johan Brunström / (Sweden) Andreas Siljeström (first round)
4. (United States) James Cerretani / (Austria) Philipp Oswald (first round)

== Draw ==
=== Key ===
- Q = Qualifier
- WC = Wild card
- LL = Lucky loser
- Alt = Alternate
- SE = Special exempt
- PR = Protected ranking
- ITF = ITF entry
- JE = Junior exempt
- w/o = Walkover
- r = Retired
- d = Defaulted
- SR = Special ranking

First round
1	(Chile) J Peralta (Argentina) H Zeballos	6	6
WC	(Italy) A Basso (Italy) Alessandro Ceppellini	4	1
WC	(Italy) Edoardo Eremin (Italy) L Sonego	4	6^{2}
(Germany) G Kretschmer (Slovakia) I Zelenay	6	7^{7}
3	(Sweden) J Brunström (Sweden) A Siljeström	6^{5}	6	[6]
(Croatia) N Mektić (Croatia) A Šančić	7^{7}	3	[10]
(Italy) M Cecchinato (Canada) S Diez	5	3
WC	(Italy) M Donati (Italy) J Ocleppo	7	6
(Poland) T Bednarek (Australia) R Junaid	6^{6}	3
(Italy) A Motti (Chinese Taipei) H-y Peng	7^{8}	6
(Belarus) A Bury (Belarus) A Vasilevski	7	7^{7}
4	(United States) J Cerretani (Austria) P Oswald	5	6^{5}
(Italy) R Ghedin (Croatia) D Marcan	6	6
(Russia) T Gabashvili (Uzbekistan) D Istomin	4	3
Alt	(Italy) A Arnaboldi (India) R Ramanathan	6	6
2	(Argentina) G Durán (Argentina) A Molteni	4	4

Quarterfinals
1	(Chile) J Peralta (Argentina) H Zeballos	6	6
(Germany) G Kretschmer (Slovakia) I Zelenay	2	3
(Croatia) N Mektić (Croatia) A Šančić	7^{8}	1	[6]
WC	(Italy) M Donati (Italy) J Ocleppo	6^{6}	6	[10]
(Italy) A Motti (Chinese Taipei) H-y Peng	6^{3}	6^{4}
(Belarus) A Bury (Belarus) A Vasilevski	7^{7}	7^{7}
(Italy) R Ghedin (Croatia) D Marcan	6	6
Alt	(Italy) A Arnaboldi (India) R Ramanathan	4	4

Semifinals
1	(Chile) J Peralta (Argentina) H Zeballos	6	6
WC	(Italy) M Donati (Italy) J Ocleppo	2	1
(Belarus) A Bury (Belarus) A Vasilevski	2	6	[10]
(Italy) R Ghedin (Croatia) D Marcan	6	2	[7]

Final
1	(Chile) J Peralta (Argentina) H Zeballos	6	6
(Belarus) A Bury (Belarus) A Vasilevski	4	3
