= 2010 AON Open Challenger =

- Date: September 7 – 12
- Edition: 8th
- Location: Genoa, Italy

Champions

Singles
- (Italy) Fabio Fognini

Doubles
- (Germany) Andre Begemann / (Germany) Martin Emmrich
← 2009 ·	AON Open Challenger	· 2011 →

The 2010 AON Open Challenger was a professional tennis tournament played on outdoor red clay courts. It was the 8th edition of the tournament which was part of the 2010 ATP Challenger Tour. It took place in Genoa, Italy between 7 and 12 September.

== ATP entrants ==
=== Seeds ===
Nationality	Player	Ranking*	Seeding
ITA	Potito Starace	55	1
ITA	Andreas Seppi	56	2
ITA	Fabio Fognini	86	3
RUS	Teymuraz Gabashvili	93	4
ITA	Filippo Volandri	99	5
ESP	Pablo Andújar	107	6
CHI	Nicolás Massú	116	7
ITA	Simone Bolelli	120	8

- Rankings are as of August 30, 2010.

=== Other entrants ===
The following players received wildcards into the singles main draw:

- (Italy) Daniele Bracciali
- (Italy) Marco Cecchinato
- (Italy) Alessandro Giannessi
- (Italy) Walter Trusendi

The following players received entries as an Alternate into the singles main draw:

- (Austria) Johannes Ager
- (Italy) Gianluca Naso
- (Poland) Dawid Olejniczak

The following players received entry from the qualifying draw:

- (Argentina) Guillermo Durán
- (Argentina) Patricio Heras
- (Italy) Francesco Piccari
- (Colombia) Cristian Rodríguez

== Champions ==
=== Singles ===
(Italy) Fabio Fognini def. (Italy) Potito Starace, 6–4, 6–1

=== Doubles ===
(Germany) Andre Begemann / (Germany) Martin Emmrich def. (United States) Brian Battistone / (Sweden) Andreas Siljeström, 1–6, 7–6(3), [10–7]
