= 2010 AON Open Challenger – Singles =

Singles
- 2010 AON Open Challenger

Final
- Champion: (Italy) Fabio Fognini
- Runner-up: (Italy) Potito Starace
- Score: 6–4, 6–1

Events
Singles	Doubles
← 2009 ·	AON Open Challenger	· 2011 →

Alberto Martín was the defending champion but decided not to participate this year.
Fabio Fognini won the Italian final, where he defeated Potito Starace 6–4, 6–1.

== Seeds ==
1. (Italy) Potito Starace (final)
2. (Italy) Andreas Seppi (semifinals)
3. (Italy) Fabio Fognini (champion)
4. (Russia) Teymuraz Gabashvili (second round)
5. (Italy) Filippo Volandri (quarterfinals)
6. (Spain) Pablo Andújar (quarterfinals)
7. (Chile) Nicolás Massú (first round)
8. (Italy) Simone Bolelli (semifinals)

== Draw ==
=== Key ===
- Q = Qualifier
- WC = Wild card
- LL = Lucky loser
- Alt = Alternate
- SE = Special exempt
- PR = Protected ranking
- ITF = ITF entry
- JE = Junior exempt
- w/o = Walkover
- r = Retired
- d = Defaulted
- SR = Special ranking

=== Finals ===
Semifinals
1	(Italy) Potito Starace	6	6
8	(Italy) Simone Bolelli	4	4
3	(Italy) Fabio Fognini	6	4	6
2	(Italy) Andreas Seppi	2	6	4

Final
1	(Italy) Potito Starace	4	1
3	(Italy) Fabio Fognini	6	6

=== Top half ===
First round
1	(Italy) P Starace	6	6^{4}	6
(Germany) A Begemann	4	7	3
WC	(Italy) M Cecchinato	2	2
(Czech Republic) J Hernych	6	6
(Germany) G Kretschmer	6	6
Q	(Argentina) G Durán	2	3
(Argentina) F del Bonis	6	5	0
6	(Spain) P Andújar	3	7	6
4	(Russia) T Gabashvili	6	6
Q	(Colombia) C Rodríguez	3	3
(Russia) A Kumantsov	6	6
ALT	(Austria) J Ager	3	2
Q	(Argentina) P Heras	7	6	6
Q	(Italy) F Piccari	5	7	2
(Germany) D Gremelmayr	6^{5}	6^{3}
8	(Italy) S Bolelli	7	7

Second round
1	(Italy) P Starace	6	6
(Czech Republic) J Hernych	1	3
(Germany) G Kretschmer	5	2
6	(Spain) P Andújar	7	6
4	(Russia) T Gabashvili	6	4	5
(Russia) A Kumantsov	2	6	7
Q	(Argentina) P Heras	2	5
8	(Italy) S Bolelli	6	7

Quarterfinals
1	(Italy) P Starace	6^{6}	6	6
6	(Spain) P Andújar	7	3	2
(Russia) A Kumantsov	5	1
8	(Italy) S Bolelli	7	6

Semifinals
1	(Italy) P Starace	6	6
8	(Italy) S Bolelli	4	4

=== Bottom half ===
First round
7	(Chile) N Massú	5	3
(South Africa) R de Voest	7	6
(Germany) M Zverev	6	6
(Portugal) L Tavares	4	3
(Chile) A García	1	0	r
WC	(Italy) A Giannessi	6	1
WC	(Italy) D Bracciali	3	2
3	(Italy) F Fognini	6	6
5	(Italy) F Volandri	6	6
ALT	(Poland) D Olejniczak	1	2
WC	(Italy) W Trusendi	6	6
PR	(Argentina) D Hartfield	3	2
(Russia) I Andreev	7	7
(Argentina) J-M Aranguren	5	6^{3}
ALT	(Italy) G Naso	6^{3}	6	1
2	(Italy) A Seppi	7	1	6

Second round
(South Africa) R de Voest	3	6^{3}
(Germany) M Zverev	6	7
WC	(Italy) A Giannessi	3	4
3	(Italy) F Fognini	6	6
5	(Italy) F Volandri	6	4	6
WC	(Italy) W Trusendi	0	6	3
(Russia) I Andreev	6	1	2
2	(Italy) A Seppi	1	6	6

Quarterfinals
(Germany) M Zverev	6	2	0
3	(Italy) F Fognini	4	6	6
5	(Italy) F Volandri	6^{5}	1
2	(Italy) A Seppi	7	6

Semifinals
3	(Italy) F Fognini	6	4	6
2	(Italy) A Seppi	2	6	4
