= 2015 AON Open Challenger – Doubles =

Doubles
- 2015 AON Open Challenger
- 2014 Champions: (Italy) Daniele Bracciali (Italy) Potito Starace

Events
Singles	Doubles
← 2014 ·	AON Open Challenger	· 2016 →

Daniele Bracciali and Potito Starace are the defending champions, but chose not to participate.

== Seeds ==
1. (Netherlands) Robin Haase / (Austria) Oliver Marach (quarterfinals)
2. (Czech Republic) František Čermák / (New Zealand) Artem Sitak (first round)
3. (Belarus) Aliaksandr Bury / (Sweden) Andreas Siljeström (quarterfinals)
4. (Argentina) Guillermo Durán / (Argentina) Horacio Zeballos (champions)

== Draw ==
=== Key ===
- Q = Qualifier
- WC = Wild card
- LL = Lucky loser
- Alt = Alternate
- ITF = ITF entry
- PR = Protected ranking
- SR = Special ranking
- SE = Special exempt
- JE = Junior exempt
- JR = Junior Accelerator Programme entrant
- CO = College Accelerator Programme entrant
- NG = Next Gen Accelerator Program entrant
- w/o = Walkover
- r = Retired
- d = Defaulted

First round
1	(Netherlands) R Haase (Austria) O Marach	6	6
WC	(Italy) M Trevisan (Italy) A Virgili	3	4
(Germany) G Kretschmer (Germany) A Satschko	6	6
(Croatia) D Marcan (Croatia) A Šančić	2	4
4	(Argentina) G Durán (Argentina) H Zeballos	7^{7}	6
(Hungary) M Fucsovics (Czech Republic) J Šátral	6^{4}	3
(Italy) M Cecchinato (Italy) M Donati	7^{7}	7
(Italy) A Motti (Romania) C Pavăl	6^{2}	5
(Monaco) B Balleret (Sweden) J Brunström	1	6^{4}
(Italy) A Arnaboldi (Italy) A Giannessi	6	7^{7}
WC	(Italy) A Basso (Italy) G Mager	6^{2}	4
3	(Belarus) A Bury (Sweden) A Siljeström	7^{7}	6
(Italy) S Caruso (Italy) Omar Giacalone	6	6
WC	(Italy) Edoardo Eremin (Italy) Francesco Picco	4	2
(Bosnia and Herzegovina) T Brkić (Bosnia and Herzegovina) A Šetkić	4	6	[11]
2	(Czech Republic) F Čermák (New Zealand) A Sitak	6	4	[9]

Quarterfinals
1	(Netherlands) R Haase (Austria) O Marach	5	3
(Germany) G Kretschmer (Germany) A Satschko	7	6
4	(Argentina) G Durán (Argentina) H Zeballos	6	6
(Italy) M Cecchinato (Italy) M Donati	1	2
(Italy) A Arnaboldi (Italy) A Giannessi	6	3	[11]
3	(Belarus) A Bury (Sweden) A Siljeström	3	6	[9]
(Italy) S Caruso (Italy) O Giacalone	6	6
(Bosnia and Herzegovina) T Brkić (Bosnia and Herzegovina) A Šetkić	3	4

Semifinals
(Germany) G Kretschmer (Germany) A Satschko	5	0
4	(Argentina) G Durán (Argentina) H Zeballos	7	6
(Italy) A Arnaboldi (Italy) A Giannessi	7^{7}	6
(Italy) S Caruso (Italy) O Giacalone	6^{5}	2

Final
4	(Argentina) G Durán (Argentina) H Zeballos	7	6
(Italy) A Arnaboldi (Italy) A Giannessi	5	4
