= 2011 AON Open Challenger – Singles =

Singles
- 2011 AON Open Challenger

Final
- Champion: (Slovakia) Martin Kližan
- Runner-up: (Argentina) Leonardo Mayer
- Score: 6–3, 6–1

Events
Singles	Doubles
← 2010 ·	AON Open Challenger	· 2012 →

Fabio Fognini was the defending champion but decided not to participate.
Martin Kližan won the title after defeating Leonardo Mayer 6–3, 6–1 in the final.

== Seeds ==
1. (Spain) Pablo Andújar (first round)
2. (Argentina) Carlos Berlocq (withdrew)
3. (Portugal) Rui Machado (quarterfinals)
4. (Italy) Filippo Volandri (second round, retired due to low back pain)
5. (Kazakhstan) Andrey Golubev (first round)
6. (Slovakia) Martin Kližan (champion)
7. (Argentina) Diego Junqueira (first round)
8. (Portugal) Frederico Gil (semifinals)
9. (Argentina) Horacio Zeballos (semifinals)

== Draw ==
=== Key ===
- Q = Qualifier
- WC = Wild card
- LL = Lucky loser
- Alt = Alternate
- ITF = ITF entry
- PR = Protected ranking
- SR = Special ranking
- SE = Special exempt
- JE = Junior exempt
- JR = Junior Accelerator Programme entrant
- CO = College Accelerator Programme entrant
- NG = Next Gen Accelerator Program entrant
- w/o = Walkover
- r = Retired
- d = Defaulted

=== Finals ===
Semifinals
8	(Portugal) Frederico Gil	7^{7}	4	3
6	(Slovakia) Martin Kližan	6^{3}	6	6
(Argentina) Leonardo Mayer	7	5
9	(Argentina) Horacio Zeballos	5	1

Final
6	(Slovakia) Martin Kližan	6	6
(Argentina) Leonardo Mayer	3	1

=== Top half ===
First round
1/WC	(Spain) P Andújar	5	6	6^{2}
(Italy) A di Mauro	7	3	7^{7}
(Italy) A Giannessi	6	6
Q	(Monaco) B Balleret	1	2
(Croatia) K Mesaroš	6	6
(Italy) S Galvani	1	4
WC	(Italy) Edoardo Eremin	4	3
8	(Portugal) F Gil	6	6
4	(Italy) F Volandri	1	6	6
WC	(Italy) Andea Basso	6	3	1
(Italy) G Naso	0	6	6
(Italy) W Trusendi	6	3	3
(Denmark) F Nielsen	6	6
(Serbia) I Bozoljac	1	2
Q	(Austria) Michael Linzer	1	2
6	(Slovakia) M Kližan	6	6

Second round
(Italy) A di Mauro	4	4
(Italy) A Giannessi	6	6
(Croatia) K Mesaroš	1	4
8	(Portugal) F Gil	6	6
4	(Italy) F Volandri	0	1^{r}
(Italy) G Naso	6	4
(Denmark) F Nielsen	2	4
6	(Slovakia) M Kližan	6	6

Quarterfinals
(Italy) A Giannessi	5	1
8	(Portugal) F Gil	7	6
(Italy) G Naso	6^{1}	3
6	(Slovakia) M Kližan	7^{7}	6

Semifinals
8	(Portugal) F Gil	7^{7}	4	3
6	(Slovakia) M Kližan	6^{3}	6	6

=== Bottom half ===
First round
5	(Kazakhstan) A Golubev	6	4	4
(Germany) M Zverev	4	6	6
(Argentina) L Mayer	6	7^{7}
(Germany) D Brown	3	6^{5}
WC	(Italy) Francesco Picco	2	4
Alt	(Italy) D Giorgini	6	6
LL	(Argentina) R Olivo	1	2
3	(Portugal) R Machado	6	6
7	(Argentina) D Junqueira	6	3	5
Q	(Italy) T Fabbiano	2	6	7
(Italy) M Crugnola	6	6
Q	(Argentina) Guillermo Durán	2	3
(Finland) T Nieminen	4	1
LL	(Italy) Enrico Burzi	6	6
Alt	(Serbia) B Pašanski	3	7^{7}	6^{6}
9	(Argentina) H Zeballos	6	6^{4}	7^{8}

Second round
(Germany) M Zverev	4	0
(Argentina) L Mayer	6	6
Alt	(Italy) D Giorgini	6	3	4
3	(Portugal) R Machado	3	6	6
Q	(Italy) T Fabbiano	5	6	6
(Italy) M Crugnola	7	1	4
LL	(Italy) E Burzi	4	2
9	(Argentina) H Zeballos	6	6

Quarterfinals
(Argentina) L Mayer	6	7^{7}
3	(Portugal) R Machado	3	6^{1}
Q	(Italy) T Fabbiano	3	1
9	(Argentina) H Zeballos	6	6

Semifinals
(Argentina) L Mayer	7	6
9	(Argentina) H Zeballos	5	1
