= 2012 AON Open Challenger – Singles =

Competitors in professional tennis tournament

Singles
- 2012 AON Open Challenger

Final
- Champion: (Spain) Albert Montañés
- Runner-up: (Spain) Tommy Robredo
- Score: 6–4, 6–1

Events
Singles	Doubles
← 2011 ·	AON Open Challenger	· 2013 →

Martin Kližan was the defending champion but decided not to participate.
Albert Montañés won the title, defeating Tommy Robredo 6–4, 6–1 in the final.

== Seeds ==
1. (Italy) Andreas Seppi (quarterfinals)
2. (Italy) Fabio Fognini (withdrew because of a muscle strain)
3. (Italy) Paolo Lorenzi (first round)
4. (Italy) Filippo Volandri (semifinals)
5. (Italy) Simone Bolelli (semifinals)
6. (Czech Republic) Lukáš Rosol (first round)
7. (Spain) Albert Montañés (champion)
8. (Portugal) Frederico Gil (second round)

== Draw ==
=== Key ===
- Q = Qualifier
- WC = Wild card
- LL = Lucky loser
- Alt = Alternate
- SE = Special exempt
- PR = Protected ranking
- ITF = ITF entry
- JE = Junior exempt
- w/o = Walkover
- r = Retired
- d = Defaulted
- SR = Special ranking

=== Finals ===
Semifinals
7	(Spain) Albert Montañés	1	7^{7}	6
4	(Italy) Filippo Volandri	6	6^{1}	3
5	(Italy) Simone Bolelli	5	2
(Spain) Tommy Robredo	7	6

Final
7	(Spain) Albert Montañés	6	6
(Spain) Tommy Robredo	4	1

=== Top half ===
First round
1/WC	(Italy) A Seppi	3	6	6
Q	(Argentina) R Olivo	6	3	4
(Austria) M Linzer	4	5
(Argentina) F Argüello	6	7
(Germany) D Meffert	6^{7}	4
(Italy) G Naso	7^{9}	6
Alt	(Italy) Enrico Burzi	7^{7}	1	4
7	(Spain) A Montañés	6^{1}	6	6
4	(Italy) F Volandri	7^{8}	4	6
(Italy) A Giannessi	6^{6}	6	3
Q	(Germany) A Begemann	6^{5}	6	6
(Chile) P Capdeville	7^{7}	3	2
(Spain) S Gutiérrez Ferrol	6	6
(Slovakia) K Čapkovič	4	1
PR	(Croatia) F Škugor	2	2
8	(Portugal) F Gil	6	6

Second round
1/WC	(Italy) A Seppi	6	6
(Argentina) F Argüello	2	3
(Italy) G Naso	4	6	4
7	(Spain) A Montañés	6	4	6
4	(Italy) F Volandri	6	6
Q	(Germany) A Begemann	3	0
(Spain) S Gutiérrez Ferrol	6	2	6
8	(Portugal) F Gil	2	6	1

Quarterfinals
1/WC	(Italy) A Seppi	1	6^{5}
7	(Spain) A Montañés	6	7^{7}
4	(Italy) F Volandri	6	6
(Spain) S Gutiérrez Ferrol	4	4

Semifinals
7	(Spain) A Montañés	1	7^{7}	6
4	(Italy) F Volandri	6	6^{1}	3

=== Bottom half ===
First round
5	(Italy) S Bolelli	7^{7}	3	7
(France) S Robert	6^{3}	6	5
(Slovakia) P Červenák	7	6
Q	(Italy) A Brizzi	5	2
(Italy) T Fabbiano	6	6
(Austria) P Oswald	2	4
(Germany) D Brown	7^{10}	7^{7}
3	(Italy) P Lorenzi	6^{8}	6^{1}
6/WC	(Czech Republic) L Rosol	7^{9}	2	4
(Spain) T Robredo	6^{7}	6	6
(Italy) S Vagnozzi	6^{2}	6	6
(Argentina) G Andreozzi	7^{7}	2	1
Q	(Italy) M Crugnola	6^{9}	6	6
(Switzerland) M Lammer	7^{11}	1	3
WC	(Denmark) F Nielsen	2	5
LL	(Italy) W Trusendi	6	7

Second round
5	(Italy) S Bolelli	7^{7}	6
(Slovakia) P Červenák	6^{1}	1
(Italy) T Fabbiano	4	6	6
(Germany) D Brown	6	3	2
(Spain) T Robredo	6	2	7^{7}
(Italy) S Vagnozzi	0	6	6^{4}
Q	(Italy) M Crugnola	4	6	4
LL	(Italy) W Trusendi	6	2	6

Quarterfinals
5	(Italy) S Bolelli	7	6
(Italy) T Fabbiano	5	4
(Spain) T Robredo	3	6	6
LL	(Italy) W Trusendi	6	2	2

Semifinals
5	(Italy) S Bolelli	5	2
(Spain) T Robredo	7	6
