= 2009 AON Open Challenger – Doubles =

Doubles
- 2009 AON Open Challenger

Final
- Champions: (Italy) Daniele Bracciali (Italy) Alessandro Motti
- Runners-up: (Israel) Amir Hadad (Israel) Harel Levy
- Score: 6–4, 6–2

Events
Singles	Doubles
← 2008 ·	AON Open Challenger	· 2010 →

Gianluca Naso and Walter Trusendi were the defending champions, but Naso chose to not compete this year.
Trusendi partnered with Thomas Fabbiano, but they were eliminated in the quarterfinal by Igor Zelenay and Lovro Zovko.
Daniele Bracciali and Alessandro Motti won in the final 6–4, 6–2, against Amir Hadad and Harel Levy.

== Seeds ==
1. (United Kingdom) Ross Hutchins / (Netherlands Antilles) Jean-Julien Rojer (quarterfinals)
2. (Slovakia) Igor Zelenay / (Croatia) Lovro Zovko (semifinals)
3. (Italy) Daniele Bracciali / (Italy) Alessandro Motti (champions)
4. (Israel) Amir Hadad / (Israel) Harel Levy (final)

== Draw ==
=== Key ===
- Q = Qualifier
- WC = Wild card
- LL = Lucky loser
- Alt = Alternate
- SE = Special exempt
- PR = Protected ranking
- ITF = ITF entry
- JE = Junior exempt
- w/o = Walkover
- r = Retired
- d = Defaulted
- SR = Special ranking

=== Draw ===
First round
1	(United Kingdom) R Hutchins (Netherlands Antilles) J-J Rojer	6	3	[17]
(Switzerland) M Chiudinelli (Kazakhstan) Y Schukin	3	6	[15]
(Croatia) I Dodig (Croatia) A Veić	6	5	[10]
(South Africa) K Anderson (Czech Republic) L Rosol	1	7	[8]
3	(Italy) D Bracciali (Italy) A Motti	6	6
WC	(Argentina) C Berlocq (Italy) F Picco	0	4
(France) A Sidorenko (Russia) D Sitak	7	3	[11]
(Russia) E Korolev (Algeria) L Ouahab	6^{7}	6	[9]
(Argentina) J-M Aranguren (Serbia) B Pašanski	6	7
WC	(Italy) T Sanna (Italy) E Wellenfeld	3	5
(Belgium) S Darcis (Italy) S Galvani	6	5	[5]
4	(Israel) A Hadad (Israel) H Levy	3	7	[10]
ALT	(Italy) T Fabbiano (Italy) W Trusendi	6	6
WC	(Bulgaria) G Dimitrov (Italy) A Giannesi	4	4
(United States) B Battistone (United States) D Battistone	4	2
2	(Slovakia) I Zelenay (Croatia) L Zovko	6	6

Quarterfinals
1	(United Kingdom) R Hutchins (Netherlands Antilles) J-J Rojer	3	6^{4}
(Croatia) I Dodig (Croatia) A Veić	6	7
3	(Italy) D Bracciali (Italy) A Motti	6	6
(France) A Sidorenko (Russia) D Sitak	4	1
(Argentina) J-M Aranguren (Serbia) B Pašanski	6	1	[4]
4	(Israel) A Hadad (Israel) H Levy	2	6	[10]
ALT	(Italy) T Fabbiano (Italy) W Trusendi	3	3
2	(Slovakia) I Zelenay (Croatia) L Zovko	6	6

Semifinals
(Croatia) I Dodig (Croatia) A Veić	6	5	[4]
3	(Italy) D Bracciali (Italy) A Motti	4	7	[10]
4	(Israel) A Hadad (Israel) H Levy	6	6
2	(Slovakia) I Zelenay (Croatia) L Zovko	4	4

Finals
3	(Italy) D Bracciali (Italy) A Motti	6	6
4	(Israel) A Hadad (Israel) H Levy	4	2
