= 2019 AON Open Challenger – Doubles =

Doubles
- 2019 AON Open Challenger

Final
- Champions: (Uruguay) Ariel Behar (Ecuador) Gonzalo Escobar
- Runners-up: (Argentina) Guido Andreozzi (Argentina) Andrés Molteni
- Score: 3–6, 6–4, [10–3]

Events
Singles	Doubles
- AON Open Challenger

Kevin Krawietz and Andreas Mies were the defending champions but chose not to defend their title.

Ariel Behar and Gonzalo Escobar won the title after defeating Guido Andreozzi and Andrés Molteni 3–6, 6–4, [10–3] in the final.

== Seeds ==
1. (Netherlands) Matwé Middelkoop / (Slovakia) Igor Zelenay (semifinals)
2. (Monaco) Romain Arneodo / (Monaco) Hugo Nys (quarterfinals)
3. (Argentina) Guido Andreozzi / (Argentina) Andrés Molteni (final)
4. (Brazil) Rogério Dutra Silva / (Czech Republic) Roman Jebavý (first round)

== Draw ==
Key

- Q = Qualifier
- WC = Wild card
- LL = Lucky loser
- Alt = Alternate
- ITF = ITF entry
- PR = Protected ranking
- SR = Special ranking
- SE = Special exempt
- JE = Junior exempt
- JR = Junior Accelerator Programme entrant
- CO = College Accelerator Programme entrant
- NG = Next Gen Accelerator Program entrant
- w/o = Walkover
- r = Retired
- d = Defaulted

First round
1	(Netherlands) M Middelkoop (Slovakia) I Zelenay	6	6
(Brazil) F Neis (Spain) D Vega Hernández	3	1
WC	(Germany) A Begemann (Romania) F Mergea	6	7
WC	(Italy) A Giannessi (Italy) G Mager	0	5
4	(Brazil) R Dutra Silva (Czech Republic) R Jebavý	6	3	[4]
(Bosnia and Herzegovina) T Brkić (Croatia) A Pavić	2	6	[10]
(Uruguay) A Behar (Ecuador) G Escobar	6	6
(Italy) L Giustino (Spain) G Granollers	3	2
(Hungary) A Balázs (Brazil) F Romboli	7^{7}	7^{7}
(Australia) R Junaid (India) P Raja	6^{2}	6^{3}
(Italy) F Baldi (Italy) S Caruso	1	1
3	(Argentina) G Andreozzi (Argentina) A Molteni	6	6
(Belgium) K Coppejans (Brazil) T Monteiro	3	4
(Argentina) F Bagnis (Italy) S Travaglia	6	6
WC	(Italy) F Gaio (Italy) A Pellegrino	4	5
2	(Monaco) R Arneodo (Monaco) H Nys	6	7

Quarterfinals
1	(Netherlands) M Middelkoop (Slovakia) I Zelenay	3	6	[10]
WC	(Germany) A Begemann (Romania) F Mergea	6	1	[6]
(Bosnia and Herzegovina) T Brkić (Croatia) A Pavić	4	1
(Uruguay) A Behar (Ecuador) G Escobar	6	6
(Hungary) A Balázs (Brazil) F Romboli	3	2
3	(Argentina) G Andreozzi (Argentina) A Molteni	6	6
(Argentina) F Bagnis (Italy) S Travaglia	6	7
2	(Monaco) R Arneodo (Monaco) H Nys	3	5

Semifinals
1	(Netherlands) M Middelkoop (Slovakia) I Zelenay	3	3
(Uruguay) A Behar (Ecuador) G Escobar	6	6
3	(Argentina) G Andreozzi (Argentina) A Molteni	3	6	[10]
(Argentina) F Bagnis (Italy) S Travaglia	6	1	[5]

Final
(Uruguay) A Behar (Ecuador) G Escobar	3	6	[10]
3	(Argentina) G Andreozzi (Argentina) A Molteni	6	4	[3]
