= 2015 AON Open Challenger =

- Date: 7 – 13 September
- Edition: 12th
- Surface: Clay
- Location: Genoa, Italy

Champions

Singles
- (Spain) Nicolás Almagro

Doubles
- (Argentina) Guillermo Durán / (Argentina) Horacio Zeballos
← 2014 ·	AON Open Challenger	· 2016 →

The 2015 AON Open Challenger was a professional tennis tournament played on clay courts. It was the twelfth edition of the tournament which was part of the 2015 ATP Challenger Tour. It took place in Genoa, Italy between 7 and 13 September 2015.

== Singles main-draw entrants ==
=== Seeds ===
Country	Player	Rank^{1}	Seed
ESP	Albert Ramos	58	1
NED	Robin Haase	79	2
ITA	Paolo Lorenzi	83	3
GEO	Nikoloz Basilashvili	101	4
ITA	Marco Cecchinato	106	5
SRB	Dušan Lajović	109	6
ESP	Nicolás Almagro	114	7
FRA	Kenny de Schepper	142	8

- ^{1} Rankings are as of August 31, 2015.

=== Other entrants ===
The following players received wildcards into the singles main draw:

- (Italy) Andrea Basso
- (Italy) Edoardo Eremin
- (Italy) Lorenzo Giustino
- (Italy) Gianluca Mager

The following players received entry from the qualifying draw:

- (France) Sadio Doumbia
- (Chile) Juan Carlos Sáez
- (Croatia) Antonio Šančić
- (Ukraine) Artem Smirnov

== Champions ==
=== Singles ===
- (Spain) Nicolás Almagro def. (Italy) Marco Cecchinato 6–7^{(1–7)}, 6–1, 6–4

=== Doubles ===
- (Argentina) Guillermo Durán / (Argentina) Horacio Zeballos def. (Italy) Andrea Arnaboldi / (Italy) Alessandro Giannessi 7–5, 6–4
