= 2025 AON Open Challenger – Doubles =

Doubles
- 2025 AON Open Challenger

Final
- Champions: (Netherlands) Mick Veldheer (Poland) Szymon Walków
- Runners-up: (Italy) Gianluca Cadenasso (Italy) Lorenzo Carboni
- Score: 3–6, 6–4, [10–7]

Events
| Singles | Doubles |
- AON Open Challenger

Benjamin Hassan and David Vega Hernández were the defending champions but chose not to defend their title.

Mick Veldheer and Szymon Walków won the title after defeating Gianluca Cadenasso and Lorenzo Carboni 3–6, 6–4, [10–7] in the final.

== Seeds ==
1. (France) Pierre-Hugues Herbert / (France) Grégoire Jacq (quarterfinals)
2. (Netherlands) Mick Veldheer / (Poland) Szymon Walków (champions)
3. (France) Geoffrey Blancaneaux / (Israel) Daniel Cukierman (first round)
4. (Denmark) August Holmgren / (Denmark) Johannes Ingildsen (semifinals)

== Draw ==
Key

- Q = Qualifier
- WC = Wild card
- LL = Lucky loser
- Alt = Alternate
- ITF = ITF entry
- PR = Protected ranking
- SR = Special ranking
- SE = Special exempt
- JE = Junior exempt
- JR = Junior Accelerator Programme entrant
- CO = College Accelerator Programme entrant
- NG = Next Gen Accelerator Program entrant
- w/o = Walkover
- r = Retired
- d = Defaulted

=== Draw ===
First round
1 | (France) P-H Herbert (France) G Jacq | 6 | 7^{7}
(India) A Kalyanpur (India) Parikshit Somani | 4 | 6^{4}
(Italy) F Agamenone (Italy) Simone Agostini | w/o
(Ecuador) Á Guillén Meza (Kazakhstan) D Popko
3 | (France) G Blancaneaux (Israel) D Cukierman | 5 | 6 | [7]
WC | (Italy) G Cadenasso (Italy) Lorenzo Carboni | 7 | 3 | [10]
(Italy) G Oradini (Italy) F Romano | 1 | 3
(Italy) A Pellegrino (Argentina) TA Tirante | 6 | 6
(Croatia) A Kalender; Pavel Verbin | 1 | 6^{5}
(Finland) Patrick Kaukovalta (Finland) E Vasa | 6 | 7^{7}
(Spain) N Sánchez Izquierdo (Italy) Augusto Virgili | 1 | 2
4 | (Denmark) A Holmgren (Denmark) J Ingildsen | 6 | 6
(Italy) F Bondioli (Italy) S Travaglia | 7^{7} | 6
(Italy) G Fonio (Italy) F Forti | 6^{2} | 4
WC | (Italy) L Darderi (Italy) Vito Antonio Darderi | 6^{6} | 4
2 | (Netherlands) M Veldheer (Poland) S Walków | 7^{8} | 6

Quarterfinals
1 | (France) P-H Herbert (France) G Jacq | 7 | 4 | [5]
(Italy) F Agamenone (Italy) S Agostini | 5 | 6 | [10]
WC | (Italy) G Cadenasso (Italy) L Carboni | w/o
(Italy) A Pellegrino (Argentina) TA Tirante
(Finland) P Kaukovalta (Finland) E Vasa | 4 | 6^{4}
4 | (Denmark) A Holmgren (Denmark) J Ingildsen | 6 | 7^{7}
(Italy) F Bondioli (Italy) S Travaglia
2 | (Netherlands) M Veldheer (Poland) S Walków | w/o

Semifinals
(Italy) F Agamenone (Italy) S Agostini | 7 | 3 | [6]
WC | (Italy) G Cadenasso (Italy) L Carboni | 5 | 6 | [10]
4 | (Denmark) A Holmgren (Denmark) J Ingildsen | 2 | 3
2 | (Netherlands) M Veldheer (Poland) S Walków | 6 | 6

Final
WC | (Italy) G Cadenasso (Italy) L Carboni | 6 | 4 | [7]
2 | (Netherlands) M Veldheer (Poland) S Walków | 3 | 6 | [10]
