= 2009 AON Open Challenger – Singles =

Singles
- 2009 AON Open Challenger

Final
- Champion: (Spain) Alberto Martín
- Runner-up: (Argentina) Carlos Berlocq
- Score: 6–3, 6–3

Events
Singles	Doubles
← 2008 ·	AON Open Challenger	· 2010 →

Fabio Fognini chose to not defend his 2009 title.
Alberto Martín defeated Carlos Berlocq 6–3, 6–3 in the final.

== Seeds ==
1. (Spain) Albert Montañés (second round)
2. (Germany) Simon Greul (semifinals)
3. (Russia) Evgeny Korolev (quarterfinals)
4. (Spain) Alberto Martín (champion)
5. (Belgium) Steve Darcis (semifinals)
6. (Italy) Flavio Cipolla (first round)
7. (Germany) Daniel Brands (quarterfinals)
8. (Algeria) Lamine Ouahab (first round)

== Draw ==
=== Key ===
- Q = Qualifier
- WC = Wild card
- LL = Lucky loser
- Alt = Alternate
- SE = Special exempt
- PR = Protected ranking
- ITF = ITF entry
- JE = Junior exempt
- w/o = Walkover
- r = Retired
- d = Defaulted
- SR = Special ranking

=== Final four ===
Semifinals
5	(Belgium) Steve Darcis	6	5	3
Q	(Argentina) Carlos Berlocq	3	7	6
4	(Spain) Alberto Martín	6	6
2	(Germany) Simon Greul	1	4

Final
Q	(Argentina) Carlos Berlocq	3	3
4	(Spain) Alberto Martín	6	6

=== Top half ===
First round
1	(Spain) A Montañés	2	7	2
(Kazakhstan) Y Schukin	6	6^{5}	1^{r}
(Argentina) E Schwank	4	6	5
(Argentina) J-M Aranguren	6	0	7
(South Africa) K Anderson	3	6	4
ALT	(Serbia) B Pašanski	6	1	6
(Ukraine) O Dolgopolov Jr.	4	6	5
5	(Belgium) S Darcis	6	3	7
3	(Russia) E Korolev	1	6	6
ALT	(Italy) S Galvani	6	1	4
WC	(Italy) D Bracciali	4	6	3
(Croatia) I Dodig	6	2	6
Q	(Ukraine) A Smirnov	6	6^{3}	4
(France) A Sidorenko	4	7	6
Q	(Argentina) C Berlocq	6	7
8	(Algeria) L Ouahab	3	5

Second round
1	(Spain) A Montañés	6	3	4
(Argentina) J-M Aranguren	4	6	6
ALT	(Serbia) B Pašanski	6^{3}	3
5	(Belgium) S Darcis	7	6
3	(Russia) E Korolev	3	6	7
(Croatia) I Dodig	6	1	6^{6}
(France) A Sidorenko	6^{3}	6^{5}
Q	(Argentina) C Berlocq	7	7

Quarterfinals
(Argentina) J-M Aranguren	3	0	r
5	(Belgium) S Darcis	6	3
3	(Russia) E Korolev	1	6^{3}
Q	(Argentina) C Berlocq	6	7

Semifinals
5	(Belgium) S Darcis	6	5	3
Q	(Argentina) C Berlocq	3	7	6

=== Bottom half ===
First round
6	(Italy) F Cipolla	5	4
(Israel) H Levy	7	6
(France) L Recouderc	6	6
Q	(Switzerland) R Valent	3	2
(Czech Republic) L Rosol	5	6	6
(Italy) M Crugnola	7	4	3
(Italy) T Tenconi	6	2	2
4	(Spain) A Martín	2	6	6
7	(Germany) D Brands	6^{1}	6	7
WC	(Bulgaria) G Dimitrov	7	4	6^{2}
(Croatia) A Veić	6	4	1
WC	(Italy) T Fabbiano	3	6	6
Q	(Italy) W Trusendi	7	6
(Monaco) J-R Lisnard	5	4
(Italy) F Volandri	4	6	4
2	(Germany) S Greul	6	2	6

Second round
(Israel) H Levy	6	4	6
(France) L Recouderc	4	6	2
(Czech Republic) L Rosol	6	6^{13}	2
4	(Spain) A Martín	0	7	6
7	(Germany) D Brands	6	6
WC	(Italy) T Fabbiano	4	4
Q	(Italy) W Trusendi	6	0	6^{3}
2	(Germany) S Greul	3	6	7

Quarterfinals
(Israel) H Levy	3	3
4	(Spain) A Martín	6	6
7	(Germany) D Brands	3	4
2	(Germany) S Greul	6	6

Semifinals
4	(Spain) A Martín	6	6
2	(Germany) S Greul	1	4
