= 2016 AON Open Challenger =

- Date: 5 – 11 September
- Edition: 14th
- Surface: Clay
- Location: Genoa, Italy

Champions

Singles
- (Poland) Jerzy Janowicz

Doubles
- (Chile) Julio Peralta / (Argentina) Horacio Zeballos
← 2015 ·	AON Open Challenger	· 2017 →

The 2016 AON Open Challenger was a professional tennis tournament played on clay courts. It was the fourteenth edition of the tournament which was part of the 2016 ATP Challenger Tour. It took place in Genoa, Italy between 5 and 11 September 2016.

== Singles main-draw entrants ==
=== Seeds ===
Country	Player	Rank^{1}	Seed
ESP	Nicolás Almagro	48	1
ARG	Horacio Zeballos	71	2
ARG	Carlos Berlocq	76	3
ESP	Roberto Carballés Baena	103	4
RUS	Teymuraz Gabashvili	105	5
UZB	Denis Istomin	107	6
CZE	Adam Pavlásek	112	7
SVK	Jozef Kovalík	126	8

- ^{1} Rankings are as of August 29, 2016.

=== Other entrants ===
The following players received wildcards into the singles main draw:

- (Spain) Nicolás Almagro
- (Italy) Gianluigi Quinzi
- (Uzbekistan) Denis Istomin
- (Italy) Edoardo Eremin

The following player received entry into the singles main draw as an alternate:

- (Italy) Lorenzo Sonego

The following players received entry from the qualifying draw:

- (Poland) Hubert Hurkacz
- (Serbia) Danilo Petrović
- (Croatia) Dino Marcan
- (Italy) Gianluca Mager

== Champions ==
=== Singles ===
- (Poland) Jerzy Janowicz def. (Spain) Nicolás Almagro 7–6^{(7–5)}, 6–4

=== Doubles ===
- (Chile) Julio Peralta / (Argentina) Horacio Zeballos def. (Belarus) Aliaksandr Bury / (Belarus) Andrei Vasilevski, 6–4, 6–3.
