= 2019 AON Open Challenger =

- Date: 2–8 September
- Edition: 17th
- Surface: Clay
- Location: Genoa, Italy

Champions

Singles
- (Italy) Lorenzo Sonego

Doubles
- (Uruguay) Ariel Behar / (Ecuador) Gonzalo Escobar
- AON Open Challenger

The 2019 AON Open Challenger was a professional tennis tournament played on clay courts. It was the seventeenth edition of the tournament which was part of the 2019 ATP Challenger Tour. It took place in Genoa, Italy between 2 and 8 September 2019.

== Singles main-draw entrants ==
=== Seeds ===
Country	Player	Rank^{1}	Seed
ITA	Lorenzo Sonego	49	1
ESP	Albert Ramos Viñolas	51	2
ITA	Marco Cecchinato	66	3
GER	Philipp Kohlschreiber	71	4
ESP	Roberto Carballés Baena	76	5
ITA	Stefano Travaglia	81	6
ESP	Jaume Munar	97	7
BRA	Thiago Monteiro	101	8
ITA	Salvatore Caruso	102	9
ARG	Guido Andreozzi	106	10
ESP	Alejandro Davidovich Fokina	126	11
ITA	Lorenzo Giustino	128	12
HUN	Attila Balázs	130	13
JPN	Taro Daniel	136	14
BEL	Kimmer Coppejans	138	15
CZE	Jiří Veselý	140	16

- ^{1} Rankings are as of 26 August 2019.

=== Other entrants ===
The following players received wildcards into the singles main draw:

- (Germany) Philipp Kohlschreiber
- (Italy) Lorenzo Musetti
- (Italy) Andrea Pellegrino
- (Italy) Lorenzo Sonego
- (Italy) Giulio Zeppieri

The following players received entry into the singles main draw as alternates:

- (Brazil) Thomaz Bellucci
- (Germany) Julian Lenz

The following players received entry from the qualifying draw:

- (Slovakia) Alex Molčan
- (Italy) Andrea Vavassori

== Champions ==
=== Singles ===
- (Italy) Lorenzo Sonego def. (Spain) Alejandro Davidovich Fokina 6–2, 4–6, 7–6^{(8–6)}.

=== Doubles ===
- (Uruguay) Ariel Behar / (Ecuador) Gonzalo Escobar def. (Argentina) Guido Andreozzi / (Argentina) Andrés Molteni 3–6, 6–4, [10–3].
