= 2022 AON Open Challenger =

- Date: 19–25 September
- Edition: 18th
- Surface: Clay
- Location: Genoa, Italy

Champions

Singles
- (Brazil) Thiago Monteiro

Doubles
- (Jamaica) Dustin Brown / (Italy) Andrea Vavassori
- AON Open Challenger

The 2022 AON Open Challenger was a professional tennis tournament played on clay courts. It was the eighteenth edition of the tournament which was part of the 2022 ATP Challenger Tour. It took place in Genoa, Italy between 19 and 25 September 2022.

== Singles main-draw entrants ==
=== Seeds ===
Country	Player	Rank^{1}	Seed
ESP	Albert Ramos Viñolas	40	1
BRA	Thiago Monteiro	65	2
FRA	Corentin Moutet	84	3
SRB	Dušan Lajović	92	4
ESP	Pablo Andújar	113	5
ARG	Federico Delbonis	118	6
ITA	Francesco Passaro	125	7
ITA	Marco Cecchinato	146	8

- ^{1} Rankings are as of 12 September 2022.

=== Other entrants ===
The following players received wildcards into the singles main draw:

- (Italy) Federico Arnaboldi
- (Italy) Gianmarco Ferrari
- (Spain) Albert Ramos Viñolas

The following player received entry into the singles main draw using a protected ranking:

- (Austria) Sebastian Ofner

The following players received entry into the singles main draw as alternates:

- (Bulgaria) Adrian Andreev
- (Austria) Lukas Neumayer

The following players received entry from the qualifying draw:

- Andrey Chepelev
- (Italy) Matteo Gigante
- (Austria) Sandro Kopp
- (Czech Republic) Martin Krumich
- (France) Matteo Martineau
- (Italy) Gabriele Piraino

The following player received entry as a lucky loser:

- (Brazil) Oscar José Gutierrez

== Champions ==
=== Singles ===
- (Brazil) Thiago Monteiro def. (Italy) Andrea Pellegrino 6–1, 7–6^{(7–2)}.

=== Doubles ===
- (Jamaica) Dustin Brown / (Italy) Andrea Vavassori def. (Czech Republic) Roman Jebavý / (Czech Republic) Adam Pavlásek 6–2, 6–2.
