= 2012 AON Open Challenger =

- Date: 3 – 9 September
- Edition: 9th
- Surface: Clay
- Location: Genoa, Italy

Champions

Singles
- (Spain) Albert Montañés

Doubles
- (Germany) Andre Begemann / (Germany) Martin Emmrich
← 2011 ·	AON Open Challenger	· 2013 →

The 2012 AON Open Challenger was a professional tennis tournament played on clay courts. It was the ninth edition of the tournament which was part of the 2012 ATP Challenger Tour. It took place in Genoa, Italy between 3 and 9 September 2012.

== Singles main draw entrants ==
=== Seeds ===
Country	Player	Rank^{1}	Seed
ITA	Andreas Seppi	27	1
ITA	Fabio Fognini	59	2
ITA	Paolo Lorenzi	69	3
ITA	Filippo Volandri	72	4
ITA	Simone Bolelli	84	5
CZE	Lukáš Rosol	91	6
ESP	Albert Montañés	111	7
POR	Frederico Gil	113	8

- ^{1} Rankings are as of August 27, 2012.

=== Other entrants ===
The following players received wildcards into the singles main draw:

- (Italy) Fabio Fognini
- (Denmark) Frederik Nielsen
- (Czech Republic) Lukáš Rosol
- (Italy) Andreas Seppi

The following players received entry from the qualifying draw:

- (Germany) Andre Begemann
- (Italy) Alberto Brizzi
- (Italy) Marco Crugnola
- (Argentina) Renzo Olivo

== Champions ==
=== Singles ===
- (Spain) Albert Montañés def. (Spain) Tommy Robredo, 6–4, 6–1

=== Doubles ===
- (Germany) Andre Begemann / (Germany) Martin Emmrich def. (Germany) Dominik Meffert / (Austria) Philipp Oswald, 6–3, 6–1
