= 2011 AON Open Challenger =

Professional tennis tournament

- Date: 5–11 September
- Edition: 9th
- Location: Genoa, Italy

Champions

Singles
- (Slovakia) Martin Kližan

Doubles
- (Germany) Dustin Brown / (Argentina) Horacio Zeballos
← 2010 ·	AON Open Challenger	· 2012 →

The 2011 AON Open Challenger was a professional tennis tournament played on clay courts. It was the ninth edition of the tournament which was part of the 2011 ATP Challenger Tour. It took place in Genoa, Italy between 5 and 11 September 2011.

== Singles main-draw entrants ==
=== Seeds ===
Country	Player	Rank^{1}	Seed
ESP	Pablo Andújar	45	1
ARG	Carlos Berlocq	74	2
POR	Rui Machado	79	3
ITA	Filippo Volandri	85	4
KAZ	Andrey Golubev	98	5
SVK	Martin Kližan	103	6
ARG	Diego Junqueira	104	7
POR	Frederico Gil	106	8

- ^{1} Rankings are as of August 29, 2011.

=== Other entrants ===
The following players received wildcards into the singles main draw:

- (Spain) Pablo Andújar
- (Italy) Andea Basso
- (Italy) Edoardo Eremin
- (Italy) Francesco Picco

The following players received entry from the qualifying draw:

- (Monaco) Benjamin Balleret
- (Argentina) Guillermo Durán
- (Italy) Thomas Fabbiano
- (Austria) Michael Linzer

The following players received entry as a lucky loser into the singles main draw:

- (Italy) Enrico Burzi
- (Argentina) Renzo Olivo

== Champions ==
=== Singles ===
(Slovakia) Martin Kližan def. (Argentina) Leonardo Mayer, 6–3, 6–1

=== Doubles ===
(Germany) Dustin Brown / (Argentina) Horacio Zeballos def. (Australia) Jordan Kerr / (United States) Travis Parrott, 6–2, 7–5
