= 2022 AON Open Challenger – Singles =

Singles
- 2022 AON Open Challenger

Final
- Champion: (Brazil) Thiago Monteiro
- Runner-up: (Italy) Andrea Pellegrino
- Score: 6–1, 7–6^{(7–2)}

Events
Singles	Doubles
- AON Open Challenger

Lorenzo Sonego was the defending champion but chose not to defend his title.

Thiago Monteiro won the title after defeating Andrea Pellegrino 6–1, 7–6^{(7–2)} in the final.

== Seeds ==
1. (Spain) Albert Ramos Viñolas (quarterfinals)
2. (Brazil) Thiago Monteiro (champion)
3. (France) Corentin Moutet (second round)
4. (Serbia) Dušan Lajović (semifinals)
5. (Spain) Pablo Andújar (second round)
6. (Argentina) Federico Delbonis (first round)
7. (Italy) Francesco Passaro (second round)
8. (Italy) Marco Cecchinato (quarterfinals)

== Draw ==
Key

- Q = Qualifier
- WC = Wild card
- LL = Lucky loser
- Alt = Alternate
- ITF = ITF entry
- PR = Protected ranking
- SR = Special ranking
- SE = Special exempt
- JE = Junior exempt
- JR = Junior Accelerator Programme entrant
- CO = College Accelerator Programme entrant
- NG = Next Gen Accelerator Program entrant
- w/o = Walkover
- r = Retired
- d = Defaulted

=== Finals ===
Semifinals
(Italy) Andrea Pellegrino	6	7^{7}
4	(Serbia) Dušan Lajović	4	6^{0}
Alt	(Bulgaria) Adrian Andreev	2	4
2	(Brazil) Thiago Monteiro	6	6

Final
(Italy) Andrea Pellegrino	1	6^{2}
2	(Brazil) Thiago Monteiro	6	7^{7}

=== Top half ===
First round
1/WC	(Spain) A Ramos Viñolas	2	7^{7}	6
Q	(Czech Republic) M Krumich	6	6^{3}	0
(Italy) A Vavassori	3	6	7^{7}
(Germany) M Marterer	6	4	6^{2}
(Italy) G Zeppieri	6	1	3
(Italy) A Pellegrino	2	6	6
(Italy) A Giannessi	4	6	2
5	(Spain) P Andújar	6	4	6
4	(Serbia) D Lajović	6	7^{7}
(Italy) G Mager	4	6^{4}
Q	(Italy) G Piraino	3	6	6
Q	(France) M Martineau	6	3	4
Q	(Austria) S Kopp	5	2
(Italy) M Arnaldi	7	6
Alt	(Austria) L Neumayer	4	3
8	(Italy) M Cecchinato	6	6

Second round
1/WC	(Spain) A Ramos Viñolas	3	6	6
(Italy) A Vavassori	6	3	3
(Italy) A Pellegrino	6	6
5	(Spain) P Andújar	4	2
4	(Serbia) D Lajović	6	6
Q	(Italy) G Piraino	3	2
(Italy) M Arnaldi	4	5
8	(Italy) M Cecchinato	6	7

Quarterfinals
1/WC	(Spain) A Ramos Viñolas	6	6^{5}	6^{2}
(Italy) A Pellegrino	2	7^{7}	7^{7}
4	(Serbia) D Lajović	6	6
8	(Italy) M Cecchinato	2	2

Semifinals
(Italy) A Pellegrino	6	7^{7}
4	(Serbia) D Lajović	4	6^{0}

=== Bottom half ===
First round
7	(Italy) F Passaro	7	6
WC	(Italy) F Arnaboldi	5	4
LL	(Brazil) Oscar José Gutierrez	1	2
(Italy) R Brancaccio	6	6
Alt	(Bulgaria) A Andreev	7^{7}	1	6
(Italy) S Caruso	6^{3}	6	4
WC	(Italy) G Ferrari	2	7^{8}	3
3	(France) C Moutet	6	6^{6}	6
6	(Argentina) F Delbonis	6	3	4
PR	(Austria) S Ofner	3	6	6
Q	(Italy) M Gigante	6	1	6
A Vatutin	1	6	1
Q	Andrey Chepelev	3	6	4
(Bulgaria) D Kuzmanov	6	2	6
(Italy) S Travaglia	6	2	4
2	(Brazil) T Monteiro	4	6	6

Second round
7	(Italy) F Passaro	2	6	1
(Italy) R Brancaccio	6	3	6
Alt	(Bulgaria) A Andreev	3	7^{8}	6
3	(France) C Moutet	6	6^{6}	4
PR	(Austria) S Ofner	2	6	6
Q	(Italy) M Gigante	6	1	3
(Bulgaria) D Kuzmanov	6^{4}	3
2	(Brazil) T Monteiro	7^{7}	6

Quarterfinals
(Italy) R Brancaccio	2	4
Alt	(Bulgaria) A Andreev	6	6
PR	(Austria) S Ofner	7^{7}	4	6^{4}
2	(Brazil) T Monteiro	6^{4}	6	7^{7}

Semifinals
Alt	(Bulgaria) A Andreev	2	4
2	(Brazil) T Monteiro	6	6
