= 2025 AON Open Challenger – Singles =

Singles
- 2025 AON Open Challenger

Final
- Champion: (Italy) Luciano Darderi
- Runner-up: (Italy) Andrea Pellegrino
- Score: 6–1, 6–3

Events
Singles	Doubles
- AON Open Challenger

Francesco Passaro was the defending champion but lost in the first round to Thiago Monteiro.

Luciano Darderi won the title after defeating Andrea Pellegrino 6–1, 6–3 in the final.

== Seeds ==
1. (Italy) Luciano Darderi (champion)
2. (Spain) Pedro Martínez (first round)
3. (Croatia) Borna Ćorić (withdrew)
4. (Denmark) Elmer Møller (withdrew)
5. (Argentina) Thiago Agustín Tirante (second round)
6. (Italy) Francesco Passaro (first round)
7. (France) Pierre-Hugues Herbert (first round)
8. (Italy) Andrea Pellegrino (final)

== Draw ==
Key

- Q = Qualifier
- WC = Wild card
- LL = Lucky loser
- Alt = Alternate
- ITF = ITF entry
- PR = Protected ranking
- SR = Special ranking
- SE = Special exempt
- JE = Junior exempt
- JR = Junior Accelerator Programme entrant
- CO = College Accelerator Programme entrant
- NG = Next Gen Accelerator Program entrant
- w/o = Walkover
- r = Retired
- d = Defaulted

=== Finals ===
Semifinals
1/WC	(Italy) Luciano Darderi	3	7^{7}	6
Q	(Germany) Tom Gentzsch	6	6^{5}	2
(Italy) Stefano Travaglia	6^{6}	6	4
8	(Italy) Andrea Pellegrino	7^{8}	3	6

Final
1/WC	(Italy) Luciano Darderi	6	6
8	(Italy) Andrea Pellegrino	1	3

=== Top half ===
First round
1/WC	(Italy) L Darderi	6	6
Alt	(Italy) F Arnaboldi	2	4
(Italy) M Cecchinato	4	2
(Kazakhstan) D Popko	6	6
(France) G Blancaneaux	6	4	3
Q	(Italy) E Dalla Valle	4	6	6
(Brazil) T Monteiro	7^{7}	6
6	(Italy) F Passaro	6^{3}	3
Q	(Italy) Gabriele Pennaforti	3	3
Q	(Germany) T Gentzsch	6	6
PR	(Italy) F Forti	6	6
Q	(Italy) Tommaso Compagnucci	3	0
Alt	(Switzerland) K Feldbausch	6	6
WC	(Italy) Lorenzo Carboni	3	0
(Denmark) A Holmgren	6^{5}	6^{3}
5	(Argentina) TA Tirante	7^{7}	7^{7}

Second round
1/WC	(Italy) L Darderi	6	6
(Kazakhstan) D Popko	3	3
Q	(Italy) E Dalla Valle	4	6^{1}
(Brazil) T Monteiro	6	7^{7}
Q	(Germany) T Gentzsch	7	6
PR	(Italy) F Forti	5	4
Alt	(Switzerland) K Feldbausch	6	6
5	(Argentina) TA Tirante	3	4

Quarterfinals
1/WC	(Italy) L Darderi	7	6
(Brazil) T Monteiro	5	2
Q	(Germany) T Gentzsch	6	7^{7}
Alt	(Switzerland) K Feldbausch	4	6^{5}

Semifinals
1/WC	(Italy) L Darderi	3	7^{7}	6
Q	(Germany) T Gentzsch	6	6^{5}	2

=== Bottom half ===
First round
7	(France) P-H Herbert	6^{2}	5
WC	(Italy) CA Caniato	7^{7}	7
LL	(Italy) F Bondioli	6	6
(Poland) D Michalski	4	3
(Italy) S Travaglia	6	6
(Croatia) D Ajduković	3	4
(Norway) N Budkov Kjær	4	4
Q	(Italy) G Cadenasso	6	6
8	(Italy) A Pellegrino	6	7^{7}
Alt	(Switzerland) R Bertola	4	6^{4}
(Spain) N Sánchez Izquierdo	3	6	6
(Croatia) M Dodig	6	3	1
(Ecuador) Á Guillén Meza	6	3	6
LL	(Italy) G Fonio	3	6	4
Q	(Italy) Andrea Picchione	6	6
2	(Spain) P Martínez	1	4

Second round
WC	(Italy) CA Caniato	7^{7}	5	2
LL	(Italy) F Bondioli	6^{5}	7	6
(Italy) S Travaglia	5	6	6
Q	(Italy) G Cadenasso	7	4	1
8	(Italy) A Pellegrino	6	6
(Spain) N Sánchez Izquierdo	3	0
(Ecuador) Á Guillén Meza
Q	(Italy) A Picchione	w/o

Quarterfinals
LL	(Italy) F Bondioli	4	3
(Italy) S Travaglia	6	6
8	(Italy) A Pellegrino	6	6
Q	(Italy) A Picchione	3	2

Semifinals
(Italy) S Travaglia	6^{6}	6	4
8	(Italy) A Pellegrino	7^{8}	3	6
