= 2009 AON Open Challenger =

- Date: 7 – 13 September
- Edition: 7th
- Location: Genoa, Italy

Champions

Singles
- (Spain) Alberto Martín

Doubles
- (Italy) Daniele Bracciali / (Italy) Alessandro Motti
- AON Open Challenger

The 2009 AON Open Challenger was a professional tennis tournament played on outdoor red clay courts. It was the seventh edition of the tournament which was part of the 2009 ATP Challenger Tour. It took place in Genoa, Italy between 7 and 13 September 2009.

== Singles main draw entrants ==
=== Seeds ===
Nationality	Player	Ranking*	Seeding
ESP	Albert Montañés	48	1
GER	Simon Greul	65	2
RUS	Evgeny Korolev	80	3
ESP	Alberto Martín	93	4
BEL	Steve Darcis	97	5
ITA	Flavio Cipolla	117	6
GER	Daniel Brands	126	7
ALG	Lamine Ouahab	128	8

- Rankings are as of August 31, 2009.

=== Other entrants ===
The following players received wildcards into the singles main draw:

- (Italy) Daniele Bracciali
- (Bulgaria) Grigor Dimitrov
- (Italy) Thomas Fabbiano

The following players received entry from the qualifying draw:

- (Argentina) Carlos Berlocq
- (Ukraine) Artem Smirnov
- (Italy) Walter Trusendi
- (Switzerland) Roman Valent

== Champions ==
=== Singles ===
(Spain) Alberto Martín def. (Argentina) Carlos Berlocq, 6–3, 6–3

=== Doubles ===
(Italy) Daniele Bracciali / (Italy) Alessandro Motti def. (Israel) Amir Hadad / (Israel) Harel Levy, 6–4, 6–2
