= 2025 AON Open Challenger =

- Date: 1–7 September
- Edition: 21st
- Surface: Clay
- Location: Genoa, Italy

Champions

Singles
- (Italy) Luciano Darderi

Doubles
- (Netherlands) Mick Veldheer / (Poland) Szymon Walków
- AON Open Challenger

The 2025 AON Open Challenger was a professional tennis tournament played on clay courts. It was the 21st edition of the tournament which was part of the 2025 ATP Challenger Tour. It took place in Genoa, Italy between 1 and 7 September 2025.

== Singles main-draw entrants ==
=== Seeds ===
Country	Player	Rank^{1}	Seed
ITA	Luciano Darderi	34	1
ESP	Pedro Martínez	66	2
~~CRO~~	~~Borna Ćorić~~	~~105~~	~~3~~
~~DEN~~	~~Elmer Møller~~	~~109~~	~~4~~
ARG	Thiago Agustín Tirante	115	5
ITA	Francesco Passaro	120	6
FRA	Pierre-Hugues Herbert	139	7
ITA	Andrea Pellegrino	141	8

- ^{1} Rankings are as of 25 August 2025.

=== Other entrants ===
The following players received wildcards into the singles main draw:

- (Italy) Carlo Alberto Caniato
- (Italy) Lorenzo Carboni
- (Italy) Luciano Darderi

The following player received entry into the singles main draw using a protected ranking:

- (Italy) Francesco Forti

The following players received entry into the singles main draw as alternates:

- (Italy) Federico Arnaboldi
- (Switzerland) Rémy Bertola
- (Switzerland) Kilian Feldbausch

The following players received entry from the qualifying draw:

- (Italy) Gianluca Cadenasso
- (Italy) Tommaso Compagnucci
- (Italy) Enrico Dalla Valle
- (Germany) Tom Gentzsch
- (Italy) Gabriele Pennaforti
- (Italy) Andrea Picchione

The following players received entry as lucky losers:

- (Italy) Federico Bondioli
- (Italy) Giovanni Fonio

== Champions ==
=== Singles ===
- (Italy) Luciano Darderi def. (Italy) Andrea Pellegrino 6–1, 6–3.

=== Doubles ===
- (Netherlands) Mick Veldheer / (Poland) Szymon Walków def. (Italy) Gianluca Cadenasso / (Italy) Lorenzo Carboni 3–6, 6–4, [10–7].
