= Johannes Ager =

Austrian tennis player

- Country (sports): Austria
- Born: 10 March 1984 (age 41) Brixlegg, Austria
- Height: 1.96 m (6 ft 5 in)
- Plays: Right-handed
- Prize money: $65,861

Singles
- Career record: 0–2
- Highest ranking: No. 266 (2 Aug 2004)

Doubles
- Career record: 0–1
- Highest ranking: No. 471 (27 Sep 2004)

Johannes Ager (born 10 March 1984) is an Austrian former professional tennis player.

Ager is a Tyrol native, born in the village of Brixlegg. He was a member of the Austrian junior Davis Cup team that competed at the World Youth Cup in 2000 and finished second to Australia.

On the professional tour, Ager won 12 ITF Futures singles titles and had a career best ranking of 266 in the world, which he reached in 2004. He featured in ATP Tour main draws at the 2002 International Raiffeisen Grand Prix in Sankt Pölten and the 2004 Generali Open in Kitzbühel.
