= Andrea Basso =

Italian tennis player (born 1993)

- Country (sports): Italy
- Born: 8 October 1993 (age 32) Genoa, Italy
- Height: 1.85 m (6 ft 1 in)
- Plays: Left-handed (two-handed backhand)
- Prize money: $131,423

Singles
- Career record: 0–1 (at ATP Tour level, Grand Slam level, and in Davis Cup)
- Career titles: 3 ITF
- Highest ranking: No. 301 (23 April 2018)

Doubles
- Career record: 0–0 (at ATP Tour level, Grand Slam level, and in Davis Cup)
- Career titles: 9 ITF
- Highest ranking: No. 503 (18 September 2017)

Andrea Basso (born 8 October 1993) is an Italian tennis player.

Basso has a career high ATP singles ranking of No. 301 achieved on 23 April 2018 and a career high ATP doubles ranking of No. 503 achieved on 18 September 2017.

Basso made his ATP main draw debut at the 2019 Italian Open after winning the pre-qualifying wildcard tournament.

== ATP Challenger and ITF Futures finals ==
=== Singles: 12 (3–9) ===
| Legend ATP Challenger (0–0) ITF Futures (3–9) | Finals by surface Hard (0–1) Clay (3–8) Grass (0–0) Carpet (0–0) |

| Result | W–L | Date | Tournament | Tier | Surface | Opponent | Score |
|---|---|---|---|---|---|---|---|
| Loss | 0–1 | Dec 2013 | Spain F42, Lanzarote | Futures | Hard | (Spain) José Checa Calvo | 4–6, 1–6 |
| Win | 1–1 | Aug 2014 | Switzerland F4, Sion | Futures | Clay | (France) Elie Rousset | 6–4, 6–2 |
| Loss | 1–2 | Oct 2014 | Italy F34, Santa Margherita di Pula | Futures | Clay | (Italy) Walter Trusendi | 6–3, 4–6, 4–6 |
| Win | 2–2 | Jul 2015 | Austria F2, Seefeld | Futures | Clay | (Kazakhstan) Dmitry Popko | 6–4, 4–6, 6–4 |
| Loss | 2–3 | Oct 2015 | Italy F30, Santa Margherita di Pula | Futures | Clay | (Italy) Matteo Berrettini | 6–4, 3–6, 3–6 |
| Win | 3–3 | Jul 2016 | Italy F22, Pontedera | Futures | Clay | (Italy) Omar Giacalone | 7–5, 6–3 |
| Loss | 3–4 | Mar 2017 | Italy F5, Santa Margherita di Pula | Futures | Clay | (Italy) Marco Cecchinato | 4–6, 1–6 |
| Loss | 3–5 | Jul 2017 | Italy F23, Pontedera | Futures | Clay | (India) Sumit Nagal | 4–6, 4–6 |
| Loss | 3–6 | Aug 2017 | Italy F24, Bolzano | Futures | Clay | (Germany) Matthias Bachinger | 2–6, 4–6 |
| Loss | 3–7 | Aug 2017 | Italy F26, Cuneo | Futures | Clay | (Italy) Cristian Carli | 6–2, 6–7^{(5–7)}, 6–7^{(4–7)} |
| Loss | 3–8 | Sep 2017 | Italy F30, Santa Margherita di Pula | Futures | Clay | (Italy) Andrea Pellegrino | 4–6, 3–6 |
| Loss | 3–9 | Oct 2017 | Italy F34, Santa Margherita di Pula | Futures | Clay | (Spain) Daniel Gimeno Traver | 3–6, 4–6 |

=== Doubles: 12 (9–3) ===
| Legend ATP Challenger (0–0) ITF Futures (9–3) | Finals by surface Hard (0–0) Clay (9–3) Grass (0–0) Carpet (0–0) |

| Result | W–L | Date | Tournament | Tier | Surface | Partner | Opponents | Score |
|---|---|---|---|---|---|---|---|---|
| Win | 1–0 | May 2013 | Italy F7, Santa Margherita di Pula | Futures | Clay | (Italy) Andrea Anaboldi | (Argentina) Leandro Migani (Argentina) Andrés Molteni | 6–4, 6–2 |
| Loss | 1–1 | Aug 2014 | Austria F7, Innsbruck | Futures | Clay | (Italy) Alessandro Ceppellini | (Kuwait) Abdullah Maqdes (Kuwait) Mohammad Ghareeb | 0–6, 3–6 |
| Loss | 1–2 | Oct 2014 | Italy F35, Santa Margherita di Pula | Futures | Clay | (Italy) Matteo Volante | (Italy) Riccardo Sinicropi (Italy) D. Della Tommasina | 4–6, 7–6^{(7–3)}, [6–10] |
| Win | 2–2 | Jun 2015 | Austria F1, Seefeld | Futures | Clay | (Switzerland) Luca Margaroli | (Brazil) Eduardo Dischinger (Switzerland) Jacob Kahoun | 6–3, 6–3 |
| Loss | 2–3 | Aug 2015 | Italy F20, Pontedera | Futures | Clay | (Italy) Alessandro Ceppellini | (Brazil) Wilson Leite (Brazil) Bruno Sant Anna | 4–6, 2–6 |
| Win | 3–3 | Sep 2015 | Italy F27, Santa Margherita di Pula | Futures | Clay | (Italy) Francesco Moncagatto | (Italy) Julian Ocleppo (Italy) Lorenzo Sonego | 6–4, 6–7^{(8–10)}, [10–7] |
| Win | 4–3 | Oct 2015 | Italy F29, Santa Margherita di Pula | Futures | Clay | (Italy) Francesco Moncagatto | (Italy) Marco Bortolotti (Italy) D. Della Tommasina | 6–4, 6–4 |
| Win | 5–3 | Jul 2016 | Italy F18, Albinea | Futures | Clay | (Italy) Francesco Moncagatto | (Italy) Federico Maccari (Portugal) Gonçalo Oliveira | 7–6^{(7–4)}, 6–3 |
| Win | 6–3 | Sep 2016 | Italy F29, Santa Margherita di Pula | Futures | Clay | (Italy) Jacopo Stefanini | (Italy) Riccardo Bonadio (Italy) Riccardo Sinicropi | 6–1, 2–6, [10–6] |
| Win | 7–3 | Nov 2016 | Italy F36, Santa Margherita di Pula | Futures | Clay | (Italy) Francesco Moncagatto | (Italy) Jacopo Stefanini (Italy) Filippo Baldi | 4–6, 6–4, [10–6] |
| Win | 8–3 | Mar 2017 | Italy F5, Santa Margherita di Pula | Futures | Clay | (Croatia) Viktor Galović | (Romania) Dragos Dima (Argentina) Juan Pablo Paz | 6–4, 6–4 |
| Win | 9–3 | Jul 2017 | Italy F23, Pontedera | Futures | Clay | (Italy) Walter Trusendi | (Italy) Omar Giacalone (Italy) Jacopo Stefanini | 6–2, 6–2 |
