= Andrea Pellegrino =

Italian tennis player

- Pellegrino at the 2026 Wimbledon Championships
- Country (sports): Italy
- Born: 23 March 1997 (age 29) Bisceglie, Italy
- Height: 1.85 m (6 ft 1 in)
- Turned pro: 2016
- Plays: Right-handed (two-handed backhand)
- Coach: Giovanni Galuppo; Andrea Trono
- Prize money: US $1,281,560

Singles
- Career record: 7–7
- Highest ranking: No. 109 (8 June 2026)
- Current ranking: No. 133 (29 June 2026)

Grand Slam singles results
- Australian Open: Q2 (2023)
- French Open: 1R (2026)
- Wimbledon: Q2 (2022, 2026)
- US Open: Q1 (2021, 2022, 2024, 2025, 2026)

Doubles
- Career record: 7–9
- Career titles: 1
- Highest ranking: No. 81 (8 January 2024)
- Current ranking: No. 509 (8 June 2026)

Grand Slam doubles results
- Australian Open: 1R (2024)
- Last updated on: 28 June 2026.

Andrea Pellegrino (Italian pronunciation: [anˈdrɛːa pelleˈɡriːno]; born 23 March 1997) is an Italian professional tennis player. He has a career-high ATP singles ranking of world No. 109 achieved on 8 June 2026 and a doubles ranking of No. 81 achieved on 8 January 2024.

Pellegrino has won one doubles ATP Tour title as well as three singles and five doubles ATP Challenger Tour titles.

== Career ==
=== 2023: Maiden ATP Tour title in doubles ===
Pellegrino won the doubles ATP Tour title at the 2023 Chile Open.

=== 2025: New career-high ranking in top 150 ===
In June, Pellegrino won his third Challenger title in Perugia, returning to his career-high in singles, from three years prior (in September 2022), of world No. 136 on 16 June 2025. He later reached a career-high ranking of No. 126 on 8 September 2025.

=== 2026: Major and Masters debuts & fourth round, top 125 ===
Ranked No. 155, Pellegrino made his Masters 1000 debut at home at the 2026 Italian Open, after qualifying for the main draw, and he defeated compatriot Luca Nardi recording his first Masters win. He reached the third round at a Masters 1000 for the first time, following the retirement of 15th seed Arthur Fils after four games in the first set. Next he upset 20th seed Frances Tiafoe to reach the fourth round. He became the third-lowest-ranked player to reach the last 16 in Rome this century. In the fourth round, Pellegrino lost to fellow Italian and world No. 1, Jannik Sinner, in straight sets.

Pellegrino made his Grand Slam debut at the 2026 French Open after qualifying for the main draw.

== Performance timeline ==
Key
W	F	SF	QF	#R	RR	Q#	DNQ	A	NH

(W) winner; (F) finalist; (SF) semifinalist; (QF) quarterfinalist; (#R) rounds 4, 3, 2, 1; (RR) round-robin stage; (Q#) qualification round; (DNQ) did not qualify; (A) absent; (NH) not held; (SR) strike rate (events won / competed); (W–L) win–loss record.
To avoid confusion and double counting, these charts are updated at the conclusion of a tournament or when the player's participation has ended.

=== Singles ===
Current through the 2026 Wimbledon Championships.

Tournament	2017	2018	2019	2020	2021	2022	2023	2024	2025	2026	SR	W–L	Win %
Grand Slam tournaments
Australian Open	A	A	A	A	A	Q1	Q2	Q1	A	Q1	0 / 0	0–0	–
French Open	A	A	A	A	Q2	Q1	Q2	A	A	1R	0 / 1	0–1	0%
Wimbledon	A	A	A	NH	Q1	Q2	Q1	Q1	Q1	Q2	0 / 0	0–0	–
US Open	A	A	A	A	Q1	Q1	A	Q1	Q1		0 / 0	0–0	–
Win–loss	0–0	0–0	0–0	0–0	0–0	0–0	0–0	0–0	0–0	0–1	0 / 1	0–1	0%
ATP Masters 1000
Monte Carlo Masters	A	A	A	NH	A	A	A	A	A	Q1	0 / 0	0–0	–
Madrid Open	A	A	A	NH	A	A	A	A	A	Q1	0 / 0	0–0	–
Italian Open	Q1	Q1	A	A	Q1	A	Q2	A	A	4R	0 / 1	3–1	75%
Win–loss	0–0	0–0	0–0	0–0	0–0	0–0	0–0	0–0	0–0	3–1	0 / 1	3–1	75%

== ATP Tour finals ==
=== Doubles: 1 (title) ===
Legend Grand Slam (–) ATP 1000 (–) ATP 500 (–) ATP 250 (1–0)	Finals by surface Hard (–) Clay (1–0) Grass (–)	Finals by setting Outdoor (1–0) Indoor (–)

Result	W–L	Date	Tournament	Tier	Surface	Partner	Opponents	Score
Win	1–0	Mar 2023	Chile Open, Chile	ATP 250	Clay	(Italy) Andrea Vavassori	(Brazil) Thiago Seyboth Wild (Chile) Matías Soto	6–4, 3–6, [12–10]

== ATP Challenger Tour finals ==
Challenger

=== Singles: 12 (4 titles, 8 runner-ups) ===
Finals by surface
Hard (–)
Clay (4–8)

Result	W–L	Date	Tournament	Surface	Opponent	Score
Win	1–0	Apr 2021	Garden Open, Italy	Clay	(France) Hugo Gaston	3–6, 6–2, 6–1
Loss	1–1	Oct 2021	Lisboa Belém Open, Portugal	Clay	(Kazakhstan) Dmitry Popko	2–6, 4–6
Loss	1–2	Oct 2021	Tennis Napoli Cup, Italy	Clay	(Netherlands) Tallon Griekspoor	3–6, 2–6
Win	2–2	May 2022	Internazionali Città di Vicenza, Italy	Clay	(Argentina) Andrea Collarini	6–1, 6–4
Loss	2–3	Sep 2022	AON Open, Italy	Clay	(Brazil) Thiago Monteiro	1–6, 6–7^{(2–7)}
Loss	2–4	Jul 2023	San Marino Open, San Marino	Clay	(Spain) Jaume Munar	4–6, 1–6
Win	3–4	Sep 2023	Layjet Open, Austria	Clay	(Austria) Dennis Novak	1–6, 7–6^{(7–5)}, 6–3
Loss	3–5	Oct 2023	Challenger Santa Fe II, Argentina	Clay	(Argentina) Mariano Navone	6–3, 2–6, 3–6
Loss	3–6	Sep 2024	Szczecin Open, Poland	Clay	(Czech Republic) Vít Kopřiva	5–7, 2–6
Loss	3–7	Apr 2025	Estoril Open, Portugal	Clay	(United States) Alex Michelsen	4–6, 4–6
Win	4–7	Jun 2025	Internazionali Città di Perugia, Italy	Clay	(Bosnia and Herzegovina) Nerman Fatić	6–2, 6–4
Loss	4–8	Sep 2025	AON Open, Italy	Clay	(Italy) Luciano Darderi	1–6, 3–6

=== Doubles: 10 (7 titles, 3 runner-ups) ===
Finals by surface
Hard (2–0)
Clay (5–3)

Result	W–L	Date	Tournament	Surface	Partner	Opponents	Score
Win	1–0	Jun 2018	Challenger di Caltanissetta, Italy	Clay	(Italy) Federico Gaio	(Slovenia) Blaž Rola (Czech Republic) Jiří Veselý	7–6^{(7–4)}, 7–6^{(7–5)}
Win	2–0	Jun 2018	Internazionali dell'Aquila, Italy	Clay	(Italy) Filippo Baldi	(Spain) Pedro Martínez (Netherlands) Mark Vervoort	4–6, 6–3, [10–5]
Win	3–0	Feb 2019	Chennai Open, India	Hard	(Italy) Gianluca Mager	(Australia) Matt Reid (Australia) Luke Saville	6–4, 7–6^{(9–7)}
Loss	3–1	Jun 2019	Open de Lyon, France	Clay	(Italy) Simone Bolelli	(Austria) Philipp Oswald (Slovakia) Filip Polášek	4–6, 6–7^{(2–7)}
Win	4–1	Jun 2019	Internazionali di Emilia Romagna, Italy	Clay	(Lithuania) Laurynas Grigelis	(Uruguay) Ariel Behar (Ecuador) Gonzalo Escobar	1–6, 6–3, [10–7]
Win	5–1	Jan 2020	Nouméa Challenger, New Caledonia	Hard	(Spain) Mario V. Martínez	(Switzerland) Luca Margaroli (Italy) Andrea Vavassori	7–6^{(7–1)}, 3–6, [12–10]
Loss	5–2	Apr 2023	Challenger di Roseto degli Abruzzi, Italy	Clay	(Italy) Jacopo Berrettini	(France) Dan Added (France) Titouan Droguet	2–6, 6–1, [10–12]
Loss	5–3	Jul 2023	Internazionali Città di Trieste, Italy	Clay	(Italy) Marco Bortolotti	(Australia) Matthew Romios (Australia) Jason Taylor	6–4, 5–7, [6–10]
Win	6–3	Jul 2023	Internazionali Città di Verona, Italy	Clay	(Italy) Federico Gaio	(Dominican Republic) Nick Hardt (Brazil) Daniel Dutra	7–6^{(8–6)}, 6–2
Win	7–3	Nov 2023	Copa Faulcombridge, Spain	Clay	(Italy) Andrea Vavassori	(Spain) Daniel Rincón (Spain) Oriol Roca Batalla	6–2, 6–4

== ITF Tour finals ==
Futures/World Tennis

=== Singles: 7 (5 titles, 2 runner-ups) ===
Finals by surface
Hard (–)
Clay (5–2)

Result	W–L	Date	Tournament	Surface	Opponent	Score
Win	1–0	Jul 2016	Italy F20, Casinalbo	Clay	(Italy) Davide Galoppini	6–4, 1–6, 6–4
Win	2–0	Jul 2016	Italy F21, Gubbio	Clay	(Argentina) Federico Coria	7–5, 6–1
Win	3–0	Sep 2017	Italy F30, Santa Margherita di Pula	Clay	(Italy) Andrea Basso	6–4, 6–3
Win	4–0	Oct 2017	Italy F33, Santa Margherita di Pula	Clay	(France) Corentin Moutet	7–5, 2–6, 6–3
Win	5–0	Mar 2019	M15 Poreč, Croatia	Clay	(France) Maxime Chazal	6–3, 5–7, 6–4
Loss	5–1	Mar 2019	M25 Santa Margherita di Pula, Italy	Clay	(Italy) Jannik Sinner	1–6, 1–6
Loss	5–2	Jun 2019	M25 Karlsruhe, Germany	Clay	(Germany) Julian Lenz	3–6, 7–6^{(7–3)}, 3–6

=== Doubles: 8 (4 titles, 4 runner-ups) ===
Finals by surface
Hard (0–1)
Clay (4–3)

Result	W–L	Date	Tournament	Surface	Partner	Opponents	Score
Win	1–0	Oct 2015	Italy F30, Santa Margherita di Pula	Clay	(Italy) Matteo Berrettini	(Italy) Filippo Baldi (Italy) Gianluca Naso	Walkover
Win	2–0	May 2016	Italy F8, Santa Margherita di Pula	Clay	(Italy) Francisco Bahamonde	(France) Samuel Bensoussan (Norway) Viktor Durasovic	6–4, 6–4
Win	3–0	Jul 2016	Italy F19, Naples	Clay	(Italy) Filippo Baldi	(Brazil) Eduardo Dischinger (Argentina) Juan Pablo Paz	5–7, 7–5, [10–2]
Loss	3–1	Sep 2016	Italy F28, Reggio Emilia	Clay	(Italy) Andrea Vavassori	(Italy) Matteo Berrettini (Italy) Jacopo Stefanini	3–6, 6–7^{(5–7)}
Loss	3–2	Feb 2017	Great Britain F2, Tipton	Hard (i)	(Italy) Andrea Vavassori	(Germany) Jannis Kahlke (Germany) Oscar Otte	7–5, 2–6, [5–10]
Loss	3–3	Jul 2017	Italy F21, Casinalbo	Clay	(Italy) Enrico Dalla Valle	(Argentina) Federico Coria (Brazil) Bruno Sant'Anna	3–6, 6–4, [8–10]
Win	4–3	Sep 2017	Italy F30, Santa Margherita di Pula	Clay	(Italy) Federico Gaio	(Austria) Matthias Haim (Germany) Jakob Sude	7–6^{(7–1)}, 6–1
Loss	4–4	Oct 2017	Italy F34, Santa Margherita di Pula	Clay	(Italy) Filippo Baldi	(Spain) Marc Fornell Mestres (Portugal) Fred Gil	2–6, 7–5, [5–10]
