= AON Open Challenger =

Coordinates: 44.3975°N 8.9624°E

- 2025 AON Open Challenger

ATP Challenger Tour
- Editions: 21
- Location: Genoa, Italy
- Venue: Valletta Cambiaso, Stadio Beppe Croce
- Category: ATP Challenger Tour 125
- Surface: Clay
- Prize money: €181,250 (2025), €127,000 + H (2017)
- Website: Website

Current champions
- Men's singles: (Italy) Luciano Darderi
- Men's doubles: (Netherlands) Mick Veldheer (Poland) Szymon Walków

The AON Open Challenger - Memorial Giorgio Messina is an annual tennis tournament held in Genoa, Italy in September, since 2003. The event is part of the ATP Challenger Tour and is played on outdoor clay courts. The tournament has been organized annually with the sole exceptions of 2020 and 2021, when it was canceled because of the worldwide COVID-19 pandemic.

== Past finals ==
=== Singles ===
Year	Champions	Runners-up	Score
2026	(Brazil) Thiago Seyboth Wild	(Spain) Pedro Martínez	6–4, 6–2
2025	(Italy) Luciano Darderi	(Italy) Andrea Pellegrino	6–1, 6–3
2024	(Italy) Francesco Passaro	(Spain) Jaume Munar	7–5, 6–3
2023	(Brazil) Thiago Seyboth Wild	(Italy) Fabio Fognini	6–2, 7–6^{(7–3)}
2022	(Brazil) Thiago Monteiro	(Italy) Andrea Pellegrino	6–1, 7–6^{(7–2)}
2020-2021	Not held due to the COVID-19 pandemic		
2019	(Italy) Lorenzo Sonego	(Spain) Alejandro Davidovich Fokina	6–2, 4–6, 7–6^{(8–6)}
2018	(Italy) Lorenzo Sonego	(Germany) Dustin Brown	6–2, 6–1
2017	(Greece) Stefanos Tsitsipas	(Spain) Guillermo García López	7–5, 7–6^{(7–2)}
2016	(Poland) Jerzy Janowicz	(Spain) Nicolás Almagro	7–6^{(7–5)}, 6–4
2015	(Spain) Nicolás Almagro	(Italy) Marco Cecchinato	6–7^{(1–7)}, 6–1, 6–4
2014	(Spain) Albert Ramos Viñolas	(Croatia) Mate Delić	6–1, 7–5
2013	(Germany) Dustin Brown	(Italy) Filippo Volandri	7–6, 6–3
2012	(Spain) Albert Montañés	(Spain) Tommy Robredo	6–4, 6–1
2011	(Slovakia) Martin Kližan	(Argentina) Leonardo Mayer	6–3, 6–1
2010	(Italy) Fabio Fognini	(Italy) Potito Starace	6–4, 6–1
2009	(Spain) Alberto Martín	(Argentina) Carlos Berlocq	6–3, 6–3
2008	(Italy) Fabio Fognini	(Italy) Gianluca Naso	6–4, 6–3
2007	(Italy) Flavio Cipolla	(Italy) Gianluca Naso	6–2, 6–7^{(4–7)}, 7–5
2006	(Spain) Gorka Fraile	(Italy) Potito Starace	6–4, 3–6, 6–4
2005	(Italy) Potito Starace	(Italy) Flavio Cipolla	6–3, 7–6
2004	(Costa Rica) Juan Antonio Marín	(Argentina) Edgardo Massa	7–5, 6–4
2003	(Spain) Óscar Hernández	(Italy) Vincenzo Santopadre	6–2, 6–2

=== Doubles ===
Year	Champions	Runners-up	Score
2026	(Serbia) Stefan Latinović (Croatia) Mili Poljičak	(Croatia) Admir Kalender (Croatia) Nino Serdarušić	7–6^{(7–1)}, 6–7^{(3–7)}, [10–6]
2025	(Netherlands) Mick Veldheer (Poland) Szymon Walków	(Italy) Gianluca Cadenasso (Italy) Lorenzo Carboni	3–6, 6–4, [10–7]
2024	(Lebanon) Benjamin Hassan (Spain) David Vega Hernández	(Monaco) Romain Arneodo (France) Théo Arribagé	6–4, 7–5
2023	(Italy) Giovanni Oradini (Italy) Lorenzo Rottoli	(Serbia) Ivan Sabanov (Serbia) Matej Sabanov	6–4, 6–3
2022	(Jamaica) Dustin Brown (Italy) Andrea Vavassori	(Czech Republic) Roman Jebavý (Czech Republic) Adam Pavlásek	6–2, 6–2
2021	Not held due to the COVID-19 pandemic		
2020	Not held due to the COVID-19 pandemic		
2019	(Uruguay) Ariel Behar (Ecuador) Gonzalo Escobar	(Argentina) Guido Andreozzi (Argentina) Andrés Molteni	3–6, 6–4, [10–3]
2018	(Germany) Kevin Krawietz (Germany) Andreas Mies	(Slovakia) Martin Kližan (Slovakia) Filip Polášek	6–2, 3–6, [10–2]
2017	(Germany) Tim Pütz (Germany) Jan-Lennard Struff	(Argentina) Guido Andreozzi (Uruguay) Ariel Behar	7–6^{(7–5)}, 7–6^{(10–8)}
2016	(Chile) Julio Peralta (Argentina) Horacio Zeballos	(Belarus) Aliaksandr Bury (Belarus) Andrei Vasilevski	6–4, 6–3
2015	(Argentina) Guillermo Durán (Argentina) Horacio Zeballos	(Italy) Andrea Arnaboldi (Italy) Alessandro Giannessi	7–5, 6–4
2014	(Italy) Daniele Bracciali (Italy) Potito Starace	(Germany) Frank Moser (Germany) Alexander Satschko	6–3, 6–4
2013	(Italy) Daniele Bracciali (Austria) Oliver Marach	(Croatia) Marin Draganja (Croatia) Mate Pavić	6–3, 2–6, [11-9]
2012	(Germany) Andre Begemann (Germany) Martin Emmrich	(Germany) Dominik Meffert (Austria) Philipp Oswald	6–3, 6–1
2011	(Germany) Dustin Brown (Argentina) Horacio Zeballos	(Australia) Jordan Kerr (United States) Travis Parrott	6–2, 7–5
2010	(Germany) Andre Begemann (Germany) Martin Emmrich	(United States) Brian Battistone (Sweden) Andreas Siljeström	1–6, 7–6(3), [10–7]
2009	(Italy) Daniele Bracciali (Italy) Alessandro Motti	(Israel) Amir Hadad (Israel) Harel Levy	6–4, 6–2
2008	(Italy) Gianluca Naso (Italy) Walter Trusendi	(Italy) Stefano Galvani (San Marino) Domenico Vicini	6–2, 7–6
2007	(Italy) Daniele Giorgini (Italy) Simone Vagnozzi	(Italy) Simone Bolelli (Italy) Flavio Cipolla	6–3, 6–1
2006	(Italy) Adriano Biasella (Argentina) Marcelo Charpentier	(United Kingdom) Jamie Delgado (United Kingdom) Jamie Murray	6–4, 4–6, [13–11]
2005	(Italy) Leonardo Azzaro (Argentina) Sergio Roitman	(Italy) Marco Pedrini (Italy) Andrea Stoppini	6–1, 6–4
2004	(Spain) Emilio Benfele Álvarez (Spain) Álex López Morón	(Italy) Massimo Bertolini (Belgium) Tom Vanhoudt	6–3, 6–4
2003	(Italy) Daniele Bracciali (Italy) Vincenzo Santopadre	(Italy) Daniele Giorgini (Italy) Potito Starace	6–3, 6–2
