= Djokovic–Nadal rivalry =

Tennis rivalry

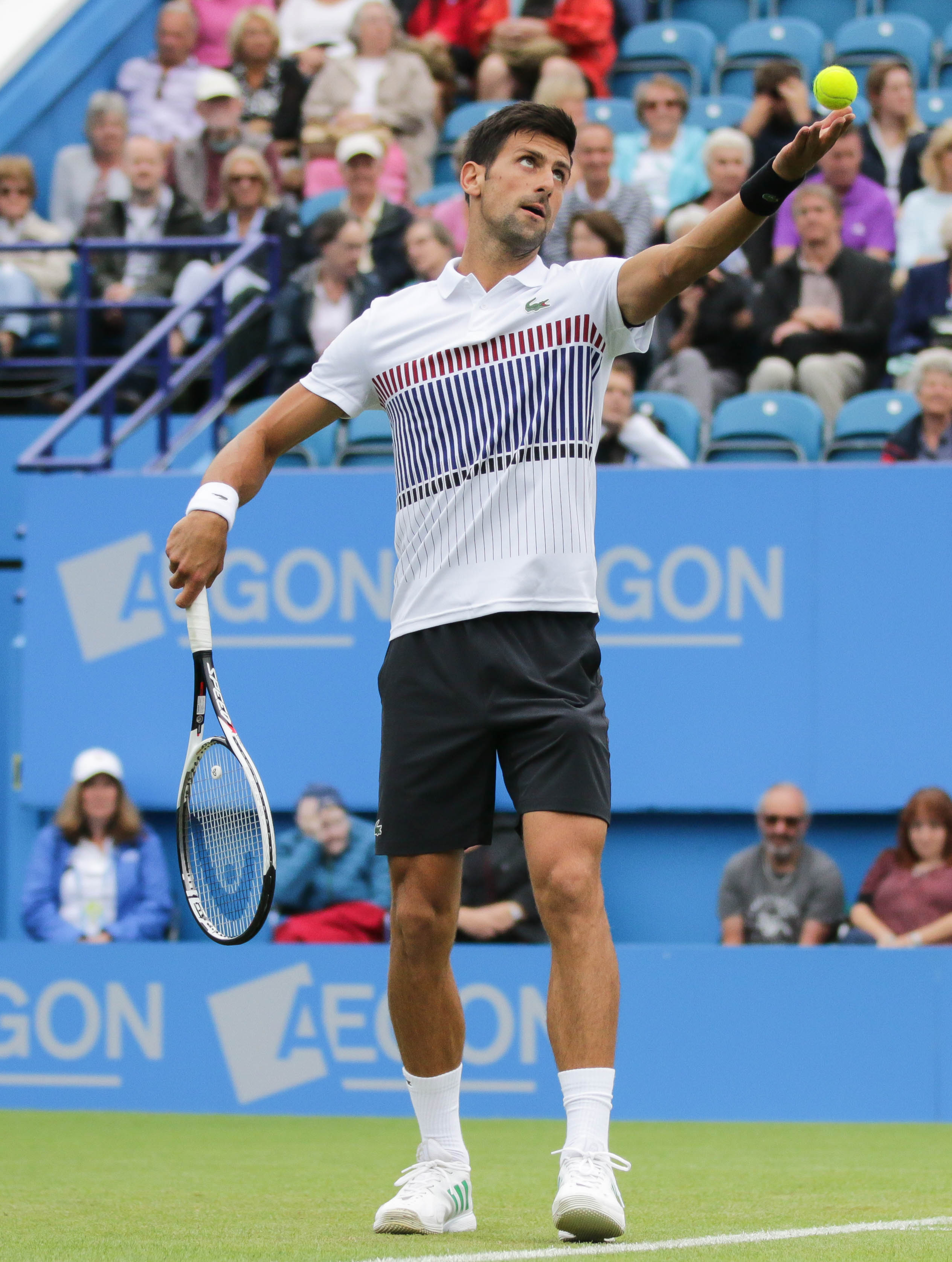
Novak Djokovic

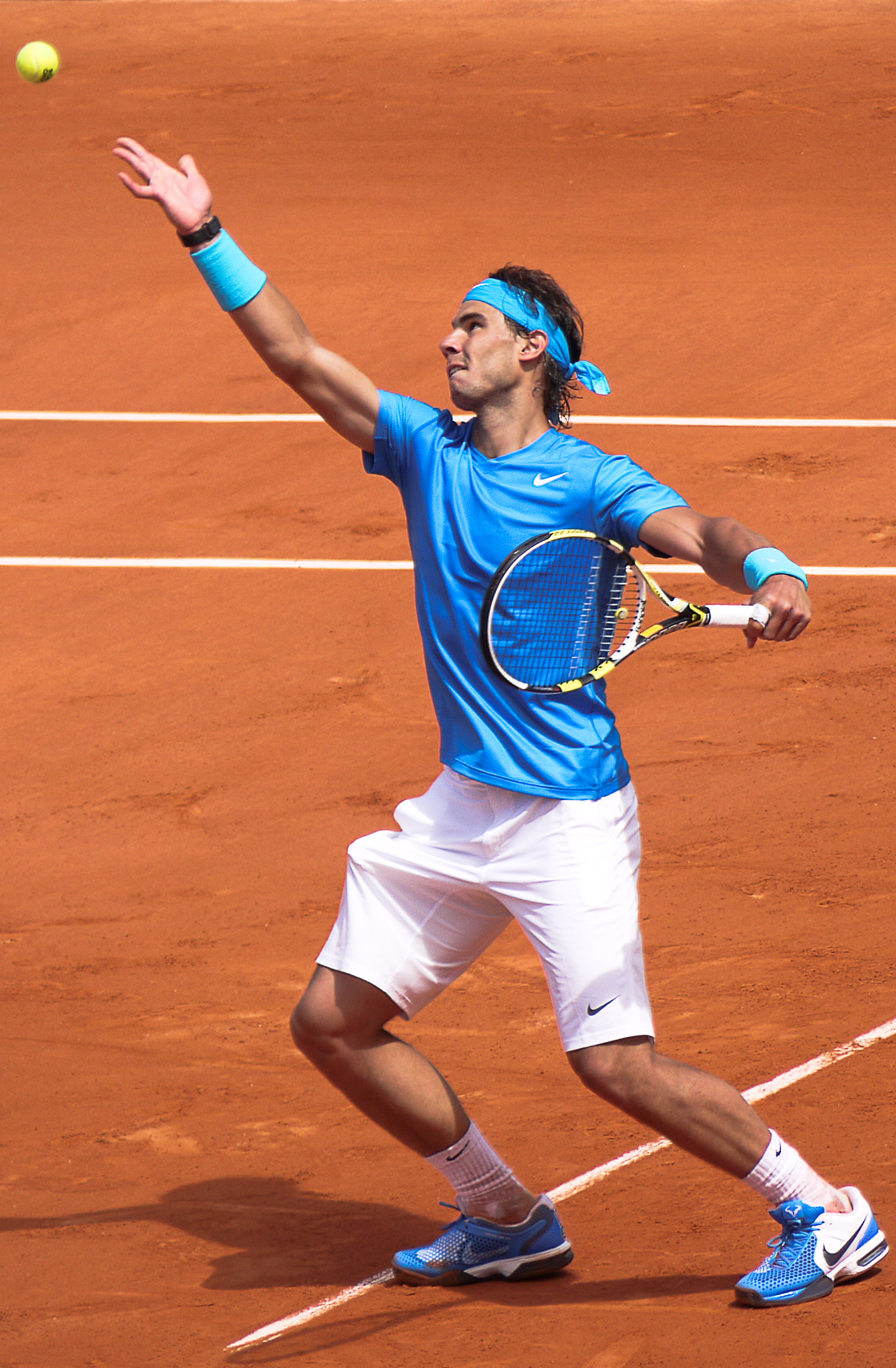
Rafael Nadal

The tennis rivalry between Novak Djokovic and Rafael Nadal was the most prolific in men's tennis in the Open Era. It is widely considered by players, coaches, and pundits as among the greatest rivalries in the history of the sport and by many as the greatest. The pair contested at least one professional match every year from 2006 to 2022, and in 2024. Nadal and Djokovic are statistically two of the most successful male players in the history of the sport.

They faced each other 60 times, including in all four major finals, with Djokovic leading 31–29 overall. Djokovic leads 15–13 in finals of all levels, while Nadal leads 11–7 at the majors, including 5–4 in major finals. Nadal leads 8–2 at the French Open and 2–1 at the US Open, while Djokovic leads 2–1 at Wimbledon and 2–0 at the Australian Open. Djokovic is the only player to defeat Nadal at all four majors. He also leads their five-set match record at 2–1. Djokovic ranks first and Nadal ranks second on the men's all-time list for the most major singles titles, with 24 and 22 titles respectively. Their rival Roger Federer ranks third at 20 titles. Of their 60 meetings, 27 matches were on hard courts with Djokovic leading 20–7, 29 on clay with Nadal leading 20–9, and 4 on grass where they are tied 2–2.

The first meeting occurred at the 2006 French Open in the quarterfinals, where Nadal prevailed after Djokovic retired with an injury; Djokovic later commented to the media that he understood what he needed to do to beat Nadal and that Nadal was "beatable on clay". Between 2006 and 2009, this rivalry was overshadowed by Nadal's rivalry with Roger Federer. It started to become widely recognized when the pair contested their first major final at the 2010 US Open. From March 2011 to April 2013, the pair contested eleven consecutive tournament finals, with Djokovic winning eight and Nadal three, the only duo to achieve such a feat in the Open Era. It is one of two rivalries in men's tennis (the other being the Djokovic–Murray rivalry) to involve meetings in the finals of all four majors, including four consecutive finals in 2011–12, and a record 29 Masters matches. Their French Open rivalry alone consists of ten matches, an Open Era record between two players at a single tournament.

Some of the matches between the pair are considered to be classics and among the greatest matches of all time including the 2009 Madrid Masters semifinal, 2011 Miami Masters final, the 2012 Australian Open final, the 2013 French Open semifinal, 2018 Wimbledon semifinal, the 2021 French Open semifinal, and the 2022 French Open quarterfinal. Their 2012 Australian Open final has been lauded as the greatest match ever played by some long-time tennis pundits, analysts, and former players and legends of the sport. Their 2012 Australian Open final and 2013 French Open semifinal are sometimes considered the best hardcourt and clay-court matches of all time respectively. The ATP Tour listed the rivalry as the third-greatest of the 2000s decade, despite only starting in 2006.

Their first match was at the 2006 French Open, which Nadal won in straight sets. Their last match was at the 2024 Paris Olympics, which Djokovic won in straight sets.

== History ==
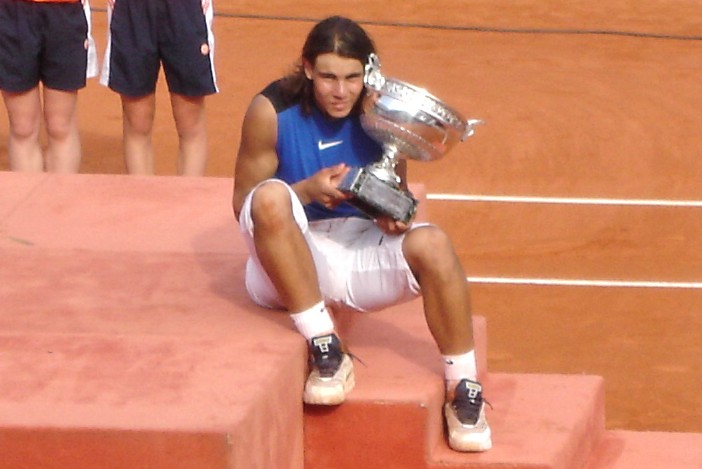
Nadal on the podium after winning the 2006 French Open, his second major.

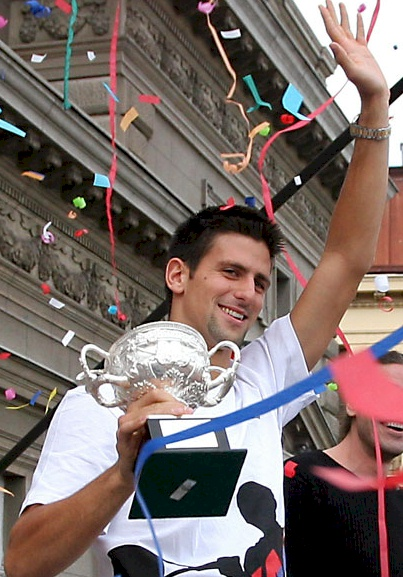
Djokovic celebrating in Belgrade after winning his first major, in 2008.

=== 2006 ===
The first meeting between the two was in the quarterfinals at the French Open. The victory went to Nadal via a retirement from Djokovic after Nadal took the first two sets.

=== 2007 ===
In 2007, the pair met seven times, Nadal winning five of them.

The first encounter came in the final of the Indian Wells Masters. This was Djokovic's first Masters final whereas Nadal was bidding for his 7th title. Nadal won the match. Djokovic, however, got his revenge the following week, defeating Nadal for the first time, in the quarterfinals of the Miami Masters.

The pair met twice during the summer clay-court season, with Nadal continuing his dominance on clay. He defeated Djokovic en route to the title in the quarterfinals of the Rome Masters. Similarly, Nadal defeated Djokovic in the semifinals of the French Open a month later, in Djokovic's first major semifinal. They then met for the first time on grass in the semifinals of Wimbledon. After splitting the first two sets, Djokovic retired from the match due to a foot injury.

At the Canada Masters, Djokovic scored his second victory over Nadal, defeating the Spaniard in the semifinals en route to his second Masters title.

The final encounter between the two in 2007 was in the round robin phase Tennis Masters Cup, with Nadal emerging victorious.

=== 2008 ===
Djokovic and Nadal met six times in 2008, with Nadal winning four of their encounters.

Djokovic defeated Nadal in the semifinals at Indian Wells Masters.

Nadal defeated Djokovic in the semifinals of the Hamburg Masters. In their third consecutive meeting at the French Open, a dominant Nadal defeated Djokovic in the semifinals en route to his fourth consecutive French Open title.

Next, they met in the final at the Queen's Club in London, where Nadal won his first grass-court title over Djokovic 7–6, 7–6.

In their fifth encounter of the year at the Cincinnati Masters, Djokovic defeated Nadal in the semifinals.

The sixth and final battle of the year came at the Beijing Olympics in the semifinals. Nadal won the match and went on to win the gold medal, while Djokovic later secured the bronze.

=== 2009 ===
They met seven times in 2009. Nadal won their first four encounters, while Djokovic won the last three.

The pair met several times on clay and matches involving them became the highlights of the clay-court season. The first and only meeting to date in the Davis Cup happened in the first round of the World Group in the fourth rubber, which Nadal won to clinch the tie for Spain. They then met for the first time in a clay-court final at the Monte Carlo Masters, with Nadal winning a closely contested three-setter and his fifth consecutive Monte-Carlo title. With his world No. 3 ranking at risk, Djokovic sought to defend his title at the Rome Masters. However, he lost to Nadal in straight sets in the final.

They then met for a third consecutive Masters tournament on clay, in the semifinals of the Madrid Masters. Nadal won a grueling encounter, saving three match points in the process. The match, at 4 hours and 3 minutes, was the longest three-set singles match on the ATP Tour in the Open Era (later surpassed by the Olympic semifinal between Roger Federer and Juan Martín del Potro in 2012). The match was voted the best match of the year by fans and critics alike.

During the US Open series, Djokovic defeated Nadal for the first time that year at the Cincinnati Masters. Djokovic then won his first Masters title of the year, defeating Nadal in the semifinals of the Paris Masters. The pair then had their final meeting of the year at the ATP World Tour Finals in London. Djokovic won the match, going 2–1 in the round robin phase.

=== 2010 ===
They met twice in 2010, and Nadal won both encounters.

Djokovic and Nadal faced off for the first time in a major final at the US Open. Nadal won the match in four sets, thus becoming the youngest player in the Open Era to complete a career Grand Slam. The match lasted 3 hours and 43 minutes.

Their second encounter came during the round-robin stage of the ATP World Tour Finals, where Nadal beat Djokovic in straight sets.

=== 2011 ===
The rivalry shifted in Djokovic's favor this season. The pair met six times, all in finals, with Djokovic winning all six encounters, including two major finals.

Coming into their first encounter of the year at the Indian Wells Masters, Djokovic was undefeated for the season and continued his streak by beating Nadal to win his second Indian Wells title.

Two weeks later, the pair met again in the finals of the Miami Masters with Djokovic winning in three sets.

Djokovic and Nadal clashed twice during the clay-court spring. In the final of the Madrid Masters, Djokovic scored his first-ever victory over Nadal on clay, in straight sets. He managed the same feat at the Rome Masters, defeating Nadal in straight sets.

Djokovic and Nadal met in a final for the fifth time of the season at Wimbledon, arguably their biggest encounter of the year. In a 2-hour 28 minute contest, Djokovic overcame defending champion Nadal in four sets for his first Wimbledon title.

They met for a second consecutive major final at the US Open, a rematch of the final from the previous year, in which Nadal had prevailed. Djokovic won his third major of the year, overcoming Nadal again in four sets.

=== 2012 ===
The pair met four times, all in finals, with Nadal winning three of the four encounters and Djokovic winning only one, which was a major final.

Djokovic won the 2012 Australian Open final after an epic five-set battle against Nadal. The match lasted 5 hours 53 minutes, the longest major final in the Open Era. At the end of the match, both players were so exhausted they could not stand for the trophy presentation. Nadal called it "the greatest loss in his career" and "the best match he ever played". Djokovic said it was a moment he would never forget, and considered it a career-defining victory.

Djokovic and Nadal met again in the 2012 Monte–Carlo Masters final. This time, Nadal won his eighth consecutive title after defeating Djokovic in straight sets, ending a seven-match loss streak to Djokovic.

The pair met again in the 2012 Rome Masters final, where Nadal defeated the defending champion Djokovic in straight sets to regain the trophy he had won five times before.

The fourth battle of the year came at the 2012 French Open final. For only the second time in tennis history (after Serena and Venus Williams between the 2002 French Open and the 2003 Australian Open), two opposing tennis players played four consecutive major finals against each other. This was a match of historic proportions as either Nadal would break Björn Borg's record of six French Open titles, or Djokovic would become the first man since Rod Laver in 1969 to win four majors in a row. Nadal eventually emerged victorious after three consecutive losses in major finals, prevailing in four sets after multiple rain delays that forced the final to be concluded on the following Monday afternoon. With this victory, Nadal became the most successful male player at the French Open, winning seven French Open titles.

=== 2013 ===
The pair met six times, with three victories each.

Djokovic and Nadal contested the Monte Carlo final for the third time, the twelfth time in the last thirteen occasions in which they met in a championship match. Djokovic defeated Nadal in straight sets to end the latter's eight-year reign at the tournament.

At the 2013 French Open Nadal came in as the seven-time champion and was drawn in the same half as Djokovic, due to his third seed. Nadal won the tournament after beating Djokovic in the semifinal and David Ferrer in the final. His semifinal clash with Djokovic was widely considered one of the greatest clay court matches ever played. Nadal was two points away from victory in the fourth set, but was denied by Djokovic and taken to a fifth set. There he went down a break, 4–2, only to break back and ultimately triumph 9–7 for a 4-hour, 37-minute victory. It was a unique encounter in that it was almost the mirror opposite of the almost six-hour 2012 Australian Open final they contested where Djokovic led Nadal 2–1 sets and was two points away from victory in the fourth set, only for Nadal to come back and win the fourth set in a tiebreak and go up a break in the fifth set. In exactly the same fashion the player leading by a break in the final set committed an uncharacteristic error (Nadal missed an easy backhand pass at 30–15, 4–2 in the fifth in Melbourne, while Djokovic ran into the net after hitting a what would have been a clean winner at 4–3 in the fifth in Paris), only to spark a momentum shift for their opponent to break back and ultimately win the match. Nadal suggested that it was almost "poetic justice" that he won this match after losing their epic encounter in Australia. This was only the second time Nadal had been pushed to five sets at the French Open (the first being against John Isner in the first round of the 2011 French Open), and he remains unbeaten in five-set encounters on clay.

Djokovic and Nadal met again at the Montreal Masters semifinals, with Nadal prevailing in three sets. Nadal would then go on to win the title, marking his 25th ATP Masters championship. The US Open final saw a third Nadal-Djokovic matchup in four years, which Nadal took in four sets. The match showed Nadal's fighting spirit, as he clawed down from 0–2 at a set apiece, and from 4–4, 0–40 on his own serve. He would take the title to beat Djokovic for the sixth time out of their seven most recent meetings.

The two players faced again in the China Open final with Djokovic winning in straight sets; however, by reaching the final, Nadal retook the world No. 1 ranking from Djokovic. They met again in the championship match of the ATP Finals, where Djokovic again won in straight sets, winning his third year-end championship and denying Nadal his first. Nadal finished 2013 as world No. 1, with Djokovic as world No. 2, having won 24 consecutive matches after losing the US Open final to Nadal. Their domination in 2013 together was also apparent in the year-end rankings: together, they amassed 25,290 points, more than the numbers 3 to 7 combined.

=== 2014 ===
In 2014, the pair met three times, all in finals, with Djokovic winning the first two encounters and Nadal winning the last one. Djokovic started by beating Nadal in the final of the Miami Open in straight sets, and then supplanted that victory with a three-set victory over Nadal in Rome. In the process he acquired a four-match winning streak against the Spaniard, and also became the first player to amass four career clay-court wins over Nadal. Their last meeting of the year came in the final of the French Open, where Nadal won the match after dropping the opening set to Djokovic.

=== 2015 ===
In 2015, the pair contested four matches with Djokovic winning all four. They met at the semifinal stage of the Monte-Carlo Masters. The match was competitive with Nadal producing, by his own assessment, his best performance yet of the season. However, a very in-form Djokovic prevailed.

They then faced each other at the French Open for the fourth consecutive year, this time in the quarterfinals. There, Djokovic beat Nadal in straight sets. It was Djokovic's first victory against the Spaniard in seven meetings at the tournament; Djokovic became the only man ever to beat Nadal at all four majors, the first man to beat Nadal in straight sets in a best-of-five-set match on clay, and the only man to beat Nadal on clay six times. This was also only the second time that Nadal had been defeated at the French Open, after losing to Robin Söderling in the 2009 edition of the tournament.

Nadal next played Djokovic in the China Open final, where he was comprehensively beaten by the Serb. They met yet again in the semifinals of the ATP World Tour Finals, in which Djokovic won in straight sets and leveled his head-to head with Nadal for the first time at 23–23.

=== 2016 ===
In 2016, the pair met three times with all three matches going to Djokovic. In the Doha final, Djokovic won in a convincing straight set victory to lead the head-to-head for the first time. Djokovic won again in the semifinals at Indian Wells and at the quarterfinals of the Rome Masters to put the rivalry at 26–23 in Djokovic's favor with a seven-match winning streak against Nadal.

=== 2017 ===
A resurgent Nadal defeated an out of form Djokovic in the Madrid Open semifinals, 6–2, 6–4 to reverse a trend of losses.

=== 2018 ===
Nadal beat Djokovic in the semifinals at the Italian Open 7–6, 6–3 in their first match in over a year.

A resurgent Djokovic beat Nadal in a semifinal epic at Wimbledon in five sets stretched over two days, lasting over five hours.

=== 2019 ===
Nadal and Djokovic faced each other in the Australian Open final with Djokovic comprehensively winning 6–3, 6–2, 6–3 in two hours and four minutes.

Nadal won his ninth Italian Open title, overcoming Djokovic to triumph at the Foro Italico 6–0, 4–6, 6–1 after two hours and 25 minutes. Nadal also broke a then-tie with Djokovic by claiming a record 34th ATP Masters crown.

=== 2020 ===
The duo met in the ATP Cup final, their second match in a team competition (the first being at the 2009 Davis Cup). Djokovic beat Nadal 6–2, 7–6.

As the top two seeded players at the French Open, they met in the final. Nadal won in dominant fashion, 6–0, 6–2, 7–5 to claim his record-equalling 20th major title.

=== 2021 ===
Nadal won his tenth Italian Open title by defeating Djokovic in a three-set final, 7–5, 1–6, 6–3.

On their ninth encounter at Roland Garros, Nadal and Djokovic met in the semifinals of the French Open, in a rematch of the previous year's final. This time, Djokovic upset Nadal in four sets 3–6, 6–3, 7–6^{(7–4)}, 6–2. It was his second win against Nadal at the French Open and Nadal's only third loss at Roland Garros.

=== 2022 ===
Djokovic and Nadal met at the French Open for the third consecutive year and tenth time overall, in the quarterfinals. In a four-hour battle, Nadal won in four sets, 6–2, 4–6, 6–2, 7–6^{(7–4)}, before going on to win the title for a 14th time. This marked the first occasion in tennis history that two players have met at a single tournament ten times.

=== 2024 ===
After over two years of not playing each other, the pair met for a record-extending 60th time in the second round of the 2024 Paris Olympics. The match was played at Stade Roland Garros, the same venue as their prolific French Open rivalry, and marked their 11th meeting at the venue. Djokovic (the eventual champion) won 6–1, 6–4, in their last professional meeting.

== Analysis ==
Commentators Dick Enberg, John McEnroe, and Mary Carillo have said that this rivalry has the potential of being the greatest rivalry in tennis history due to the number of matches played between the two, the quality of the matches, and the age difference of only one year. Both play a similar style of tennis but have differences that make their matches competitive and unique.

Djokovic is the player with the most career wins against Nadal. Likewise, Nadal is the player with the most career wins against Djokovic. Djokovic is the only player to have defeated Nadal in four clay-court finals, the only player to defeat Nadal twice at the French Open, and the only player to defeat Nadal in seven consecutive finals, all of which were Big Titles. Djokovic has seven straight-set wins over Nadal on clay, the most by any player, and is also the only player to beat Nadal on clay in the best-of-five-sets format after dropping the opening set. He is also the only player to defeat Nadal in three consecutive major finals (2011 Wimbledon to 2012 Australian Open) and the only player to defeat Nadal in all four grand slams (Australian Open, French Open, Wimbledon and US Open). Djokovic is the only player to defeat Nadal after dropping the first set in a major final (2012 Australian Open), and the only player to defeat Nadal in straight sets in a major final (2019 Australian Open). On the other hand, Nadal is the only player to defeat Djokovic in two hard court major finals (US Open 2010 and 2013), and the only player to bagel Djokovic twice, at the 2019 Italian Open and 2020 French Open, both in finals. Nadal is also the only player to defeat Djokovic eight times at the same tournament, at the French Open.

The rivalry has seen dominance shift back and forth, with Nadal winning sixteen of their first twenty-three matches, followed by Djokovic beating Nadal seven times in a row, then Nadal winning six of seven, and Djokovic winning sixteen of the last twenty-three. The rivalry has also seen surface dominance from both players, with Nadal winning his first 9 clay court matches against Djokovic and Djokovic winning his last 9 hard court matches against Nadal without losing a set in any of them.

Many pundits have claimed this to be the greatest rivalry of the Open Era, given the number of records it has produced, the quality of their matches, it having the most encounters in the Open Era, and the number of classic matches it has produced that are unrivaled by any other. In 2009, it was rated the third best rivalry of the last decade, even though it only began in 2006.

Many of their matches on clay have been listed by Tennis.com as those which made Nadal the "King of Clay", such as the 2009 Madrid Open semifinal, the 2012 French Open final, the 2013 French Open semifinal, and the 2022 French Open quarterfinal.

=== Grand Slam tournament ===
Djokovic has an all-time record of 24 Grand Slam tournament titles while Nadal has 22. Both Nadal and Djokovic completed multiple Career Grand Slams—Nadal in 2010/2022 and Djokovic in 2016/2021/2023. Both have achieved a Surface Slam by winning major titles across three different surfaces in the same year—Nadal in 2010 and Djokovic in 2021. In 2015–16 Djokovic managed to be the reigning champion of all four Grand Slam tournaments at once becoming the only male player in history to have done so across three different surfaces. Djokovic's Grand Slam tournament titles include 14 on hard courts, 3 on clay, and 7 on grass, while Nadal's Grand Slam tournament titles include 6 on hard courts, 14 on clay, and 2 on grass. Djokovic has played in an Open Era record 81 grand slam tournaments (tied with Federer and Feliciano Lopez), 40 on hard courts, 21 on clay, and 20 on grass. Nadal has played on 68 grand slam tournaments, tied for 10th most in the Open Era, 34 on hard courts, 19 on clay, and 15 on grass. As of the 2026 Australian Open, Djokovic has played in a record 458 grand slam matches and has a 402–56 win-loss record, a 87.77% win rate, which is second only to Borg’s 89.24% (141–17 record). Nadal played 358 grand slam matches, 100 less than Djokovic, and has a record of 314–44, a win rate of 87.71%

Tournament	Djokovic	Nadal
Australian Open	**10**	2
French Open	3	**14**
Wimbledon	7	2
US Open	4	4
**Total count**	**24**	22

- **Bold** indicates outright record.

=== ATP Masters ===
Djokovic holds the record for the most Masters titles with 40, while Nadal is second with 36. Nadal has won 26 on clay and 10 on hard courts. Djokovic has won 29 on hard courts and 11 on clay. Nadal and Djokovic won their first ATP Masters event in 2005 and 2007 respectively. Since then, the only ATP Masters events missed in their respective careers were: Nadal: Miami, Shanghai (hard outdoor) and Paris (hard indoor); Djokovic: Hamburg (clay) and Madrid (hard indoor).

Tournament	Djokovic	Nadal
Indian Wells Masters	**5**	3
Miami Open	**6**	0
Monte-Carlo Masters	2	**11**
Madrid Open (clay)^{1}	3	**4**
German Open^{1}	0	1
Italian Open	6	**10**
Canadian Open	4	**5**
Cincinnati Masters	3	1
Shanghai Masters^{2}	**4**	0
Madrid Open (indoor hard)^{2}	0	1
Paris Masters	**7**	0
**Total count**	**40**	36

- **Bold** indicates outright record (ATP Masters)

^{1} Held as Hamburg Masters (clay) until 2008, Madrid Masters (clay) since 2009.
^{2} Held as Stuttgart Masters (indoor hardcourt) in 2001, Madrid Masters (indoor hardcourt) from 2002 to 2008, Shanghai Masters (outdoor hardcourt) since 2009.

=== ATP Finals ===
Djokovic has won a record 7 ATP Finals titles in total, while Nadal never won the event, reaching the final in 2010 and 2013. Djokovic has a 3–2 advantage over Nadal in the event and won their only meeting in the title match in 2013. The ATP Finals has been played on one surface from 2006 to 2025, all 20 tournaments have been played on indoor hard courts.

Tournament	Djokovic	Nadal
ATP Finals	**7**	0

- **Bold** indicates outright record (ATP Finals).

=== ATP/ITF rankings ===
Rankings	Djokovic	Nadal
Weeks as world No. 1	**428**	209
ATP Year-end No. 1	**8**	5
ITF World Champion	**8**	5

- **Bold** indicates outright record.

=== Main tennis and sports awards ===
Award	Djokovic	Nadal
ATP Sportsmanship award	0	5
ATP Fan Favorite	0	1
ATP Arthur Ashe Humanitarian of the year	1	1
ATP Most Improved Player of the year	2	1
ATP Comeback Player of the year	1	1
ATP Newcomer of the year	0	1
Laureus Sportsman of the year	5	2
Laureus Comeback Player of the year	0	1
ESPY Best International Athlete	0	1
ESPY Best Male Tennis Player	6	3
BBC Overseas Sports Personality of the year	1	1
L'Équipe Champion of Champions	2	4
Marca Leyenda Sport Professional of the year	1	1

=== National and international representation ===
Djokovic and Nadal faced each other at the 2008 and 2024 Olympics, with each winning one match. Nadal won their only match at the Davis Cup in the 1st round tie in 2009. Djokovic won in the finals of the inaugural ATP Cup in Sydney. Other ITF/ATP team events played by them are Hopman Cup by Djokovic, United Cup by both, and Laver Cup by both for Europe.

Tournament	Djokovic	Nadal
Olympic Medals	Tennis at the 2024 Summer Olympics – Men's singles Tennis at the 2008 Summer Olympics – Men's singles	Tennis at the 2008 Summer Olympics – Men's singles Tennis at the 2016 Summer Olympics – Men's doubles
Davis Cup	1	4
ATP Cup	1	0
Hopman Cup	0	-
Laver Cup	1	2
United Cup	0	0

=== Head-to-head tallies ===
- **All matches (60): Djokovic**, 31–29
  - **All finals (28): Djokovic**, 15–13
  - Grand Slam matches: **Nadal**, 11–7
    - Australian Open: **Djokovic**, 2–0
    - French Open: **Nadal**, 8–2
    - Wimbledon: **Djokovic**, 2–1
    - US Open: **Nadal**, 2–1
  - Grand Slam finals: **Nadal**, 5–4
    - Australian Open: **Djokovic**, 2–0
    - French Open: **Nadal**, 3–0
    - Wimbledon: **Djokovic**, 1–0
    - US Open: **Nadal**, 2–1
  - Year-end championships matches: **Djokovic**, 3–2
  - Year-end championships finals: **Djokovic**, 1–0
  - ATP Masters matches: **Djokovic**, 16–13
  - ATP Masters finals: Tied 7–7
  - Olympic matches: Tied 1–1
  - Team events: Tied 1–1
  - Other matches: **Djokovic**, 3–1
  - Other finals: **Djokovic**, 3–1

==== Results on each court surface ====
- Clay courts: **Nadal** 20–9
- Hard courts: **Djokovic** 20–7
  - Outdoor: **Djokovic** 16–5
  - Indoor: **Djokovic** 4–2
- Grass courts: Tied 2–2

==== Tournament overview ====
Tournament	Hard Court (o)		Clay		Grass		Hard Court (i)		Total	
Tournament	Djokovic	Nadal	Djokovic	Nadal	Djokovic	Nadal	Djokovic	Nadal	Djokovic	Nadal
Australian Open	2	0							2	0
French Open			2	8					2	8
Wimbledon					2	1			2	1
US Open	1	2							1	2
Indian Wells Masters	3	1							3	1
Miami Open	3	0							3	0
Monte-Carlo Masters			2	2					2	2
Italian Open			3	6					3	6
German Open / Madrid Open			1	3					1	3
Canadian Open	1	1							1	1
Cincinnati Masters	2	0							2	0
Paris Masters							1	0	1	0
ATP Tour Finals							3	2	3	2
China Open	2	0							2	0
Queen's Club					0	1			0	1
Qatar Open	1	0							1	0
Davis Cup			0	1					0	1
ATP Cup	1	0							1	0
Olympic Games	0	1	1	0					1	1
Total	16	5	9	20	2	2	4	2	31	29

==== Grand Slam matches ====
- Final matches indicated in **bold**.

Tournament	2006	2007	2008	2009	2010	2011	2012	2013	2014	2015	2016	2017	2018	2019	2020	2021	2022
Australian Open							**D**							**D**			
French Open	N	N	N				**N**	N	**N**	D					**N**	D	N
Wimbledon		N				**D**							D				
US Open					**N**	**D**		**N**									

==== Completed set tallies ====
Djokovic	Set score	Nadal
1	10–8	0
0	9–7	1
9	7–6	10
7	7–5	11
14	6–4	21
28	6–3	10
16	6–2	14
9	6–1	8
0	6–0	2
84	Total sets	77†
52.17%	Total sets	47.83%
796	Total games	752
51.42%	Total games	48.58%

† Nadal won 2 incomplete sets where Djokovic retired at the 2006 French Open and 2007 Wimbledon.

== Famous matches ==
=== 2008 Hamburg Masters semifinal ===
In their first epic match, Nadal prevailed over Djokovic in a marathon match in the semifinals of the 2008 Hamburg Masters. The match lasted 3 hours and 3 minutes. It was their 10th match, and the first to go to a deciding set. It was a back-and-forth match: Djokovic was up 3–0 in the first set, and had chances to go 4–0 up, before Nadal rallied back and won the set 7–5. The last game lasted more than 15 minutes and Nadal needed five match points to finally prevail, with Djokovic netting an attempted drop shot on the final match point. The match was a sign of things to come for the rivalry, with brutal baseline rallies and grinding gladiatorial matches.

=== 2009 Madrid Masters semifinal ===
At the time of the 2009 Madrid Open, Nadal was widely regarded as invincible on clay courts by many in the tennis world, Djokovic emerged as one of the few who could test his dominance on it, and the closest Nadal came to losing for the first time in this tournament came in May 2009. It was the longest Masters match and semifinal in Open Era history. Djokovic, ranked No. 4 in the world, took the first set 6–3. But the world No. 1 Nadal remained resilient, saving three match points and eventually ending up winning in three sets after 4 hours and 3 minutes, in what he called one of the greatest wins of his career. The match was voted the best match in Madrid Open history in 2022. It is considered by some to be the best three-set match ever played, and one of the best in history.

The match between was at the time the longest men's tennis match in the Open Era played with the best-of-three-sets system. This record was later broken by Federer and del Potro at the 2012 London Olympics in their 4-hour and 26-minute semifinal match. It remains the longest ATP Masters match played with the best-of-three-sets system.

=== 2010 US Open final ===
Nadal needed to win the 2010 US Open to complete the Career Golden Slam; this generated much anticipation before the tournament, even more so when he would have to face Djokovic in the final, the Serb having an excellent record on this hard court surface. Nadal improved his serve significantly in 2010, and by this tournament it had become a powerful weapon. He ultimately won the match in four sets (6–4, 5–7, 6–4, 6–2), becoming the fourth man in the Open Era (after Rod Laver, Andre Agassi, and Roger Federer) to complete a Career Grand Slam and the second man in the open era to complete a Career Golden Slam, after Agassi. Furthermore, Nadal became the fifth man in the Open Era to win three of the four grand slams in the same year.

=== 2011 Miami Masters final ===
The match was the second time in which Nadal and Djokovic met in 2011, after having met a fortnight earlier in the Indian Wells final. Nadal was attempting to win the Miami Masters for the first time in his career, while Djokovic looked to keep his 23-match winning streak alive. Nadal, ranked No. 1, took the first set 6–4. Djokovic, No. 2, fought back and prevailed in three sets, winning the last set in a tiebreak 7–6^{(7–4)}, with the match having lasted 3 hours and 22 minutes. The final is considered to be one of the greatest in Miami Masters history, praised for its intensity and quality.

=== 2011 Wimbledon final ===
The 2011 Wimbledon final would put the world No. 1 ranked and defending champion Nadal against the No. 2 ranked Djokovic who was looking for his first Wimbledon title. Nadal, on a 20-match winning streak at the All England Club, was favoured by many to win despite Djokovic coming into the match with four finals victories over Nadal during the year. However, with a four set victory, Djokovic became the first Serbian man to win Wimbledon and overtook Nadal for the No. 1 ranking the next day.

=== 2011 US Open final ===
The 2011 US Open final had Nadal as the defending champion after defeating Djokovic the prior year but with Djokovic having defeated Nadal in five finals including a victory over Nadal in the Wimbledon final earlier in the year, expectations were high on Djokovic to win his first US Open title. In a match lasting 4 hours and 10 minutes, Djokovic defeated Nadal for a sixth consecutive finals victory over Nadal. With the win, Djokovic became the sixth man in the Open Era to win three of the four majors in the same year. The match is praised for being representative of their gladiatorial battles, with the third set being seen as one of the greatest sets of tennis ever.

=== 2012 Australian Open final ===
The duo faced off in their third straight major final, in what was the most anticipated and hyped match of the tournament, with a Bleacher Report article describing it as "one of the most highly anticipated, as well as predicted, Australian Open finals matches the world has seen". The top two players in the world battled in what was the longest Grand Slam final in history with Djokovic prevailing 7–5 in the fifth set in 5 hours 53 minutes. Both players were exhausted to the extent that chairs had to be brought out during presentation. The sixth game of the first set was particularly long, lasting over 11 minutes, going to five deuces and Nadal saving two break points. The momentum switched several times throughout the match, with Nadal winning the first set, and at one stage Djokovic being only two points from winning the fourth set (and thus the championship). However, Nadal managed to force a deciding set. He went up a break in the fifth set, but the turning point was when he missed a backhand winner at the net at 4–2 30–15, and lost his chance to consolidate his break. Djokovic later converted his first championship point.

Tennis legends Björn Borg, Andre Agassi, Pete Sampras, Pat Cash, and Jim Courier have all responded saying this was the greatest match of all time. Sampras expressed that the match was "by far the greatest match [he] ever saw. Incredible performances from both guys". Agassi said, "I think this was the best tennis match ever in the men's game". Borg said, "It showed what it takes to beat this top group of players. Truly fantastic match to watch. One of the greatest I’ve ever seen." Tennis historian Steve Flink is quoted as saying to World Tennis that "This was definitely one of the greatest matches of all time – easily one of the ten best since the Open Era of tennis started in 1968." Many congratulated both players for playing the greatest match ever witnessed, and news media also commented on the incredible quality of the match, with sports broadcaster Russell Fuller stating that it was the "most physical and intense sporting event I have ever witnessed". Simon Briggs, writing for The Daily Telegraph, stated that "It was certainly the longest, surely the hardest and arguably the greatest Grand Slam final in history." Tennis journalist Scoop Malinowski expressed that "This match was beyond comprehension. I've never seen such an epic display of such talent, stamina and ferocity over the course of six hours". After the match, Nadal stated that "Physically it was the toughest match I ever played, if not tougher. I am tired." In 2015, Nadal chose the final as his favorite memory at the Australian Open over his win in 2009. In 2019, Tennis Majors stated that it was "arguably the most gruelling grand slam final ever". In 2020, Djokovic cited the final as the most grueling and physically exhausting match he ever played. In 2022, Casper Ruud, a fan of Nadal, stated that if he could change one match in the history of tennis, it would be the final in favor of Nadal. In 2023, it was listed by Tennis.com as one of the key matches in the "GOAT race" for most Grand Slam titles between the Big Three.

With the win, Djokovic brought his win streak against Nadal to seven, all of which were in finals and 3 being Grand Slam finals. The match remains the only time that Nadal lost a major final after winning the first set. It remains the longest match by duration for both players.

The match is widely regarded as one of the greatest tennis matches ever played, as well as being arguably the most physical match ever played. Both players said the match was the toughest they had ever played physically. Numerous sources have likened the match to a gladiator fight, due to the extreme physicality and intensity of the match itself.

=== 2012 French Open final ===
This match was the fourth straight Djokovic vs Nadal major final. Rafael Nadal won the first set 6–4, Nadal gaining a break of serve after a long attritional battle. There were several delays due to the erratic rain, but none lasting more than an hour. With Nadal leading by two sets to one, and Djokovic leading 2–1 and serving (up a break) in the fourth set, the match was suspended due to rain and played the next day; it was initially thought that Djokovic had gained the momentum, having won eight games in a row prior to the suspension of the match, but Nadal was able to regroup and take the fourth set, and ultimately the match, after Djokovic double-faulted on championship point.

=== 2013 Monte-Carlo Masters final ===
Djokovic defeated eight-time defending champion Nadal in the final of the 2013 Monte-Carlo Masters in straight sets. It was Nadal's second loss at the event, and his first in a final. Nadal was on a 46-match win streak heading into the final, and was the eight-time defending champion. Djokovic was up 5–0 in the first set, before Nadal made a small comeback, however, Djokovic ultimately took the set 6–2. He then won the next set in a tiebreak, letting out an iconic roar when he won.

=== 2013 French Open semifinal ===
In the most anticipated match of the tournament, Nadal defeated Djokovic in a five-set epic that lasted 4 hours and 37 minutes. Both players produced incredible tennis in what was a mirror image of the 2012 Australian Open final. The match had momentum swings throughout the entire affair but the most important occurred late in the fifth set when Djokovic, up a break, touched the net on a winner that would have put him in position to serve for the match, losing the point. He never recovered mentally from this mistake and Nadal saved the break and immediately broke back, eventually winning the final set. After the match, Nadal stated "I lost a match like this in Australia," and that "This one was for me."

Björn Borg dubbed it the greatest clay court match ever. John McEnroe said it might have been the best match ever played on a clay court. Tennis historian Steve Flink told World Tennis that "It was definitely among the finest semifinals ever played". Journalist Bud Collins described it as "one of the most thrilling matches played at the French Open". In 2023, it was listed by Tennis.com as one of the key matches in the "GOAT race" for most Grand Slam titles between the Big Three.

It was the second time out of three in Nadal's career that he was pushed to five sets at the French Open, after John Isner in the first round of the 2011 French Open, and later Felix Auger-Aliassime in the fourth round of the 2022 French Open.

It is considered to be one of the best matches in French Open history, and the best match the pair have played against each other at the French Open. The match was seen as the de facto final.

=== 2013 Canada Masters semifinal ===
Nadal defeated two-time defending champion Djokovic in the semifinals of the 2013 Canada Masters. It was a particularly tense match, especially after Nadal hit Djokovic in the face by accident when Djokovic came to the net and Nadal hit a passing shot. Nadal won the first set 6–4, before Djokovic answered back in the second with a 6–3 set. The third set then went to a tiebreak, in which Nadal dominated and ultimately clinched in the end. It has been praised as a thriller.

=== 2014 Rome Masters final ===
Djokovic defeated two-time defending champion Nadal for the second time in a Rome Masters final, at the 2014 Rome Masters final, the first time being in 2011 in straight sets. It was Nadal's only loss in a Rome Masters final after having won the first set. Nadal would take the first set, surging to a double-break lead behind a ferocious offensive onslaught, and held on to take the opener in 46 minutes, at 6–4. Djokovic would respond by rallying back to take the next two sets 6–3.

=== 2015 French Open quarterfinal ===
Djokovic defeated five-time defending champion Nadal, ending a record 39-match winning streak at the tournament in straight sets. After a highly competitive first set, Nadal's level declined in the second and third allowing Djokovic to finally get the better of him at the tournament he had dominated for the last ten years. It was the second time Nadal lost in the French Open and the first time he lost in straight sets at the event. Djokovic eventually lost in the final to Stan Wawrinka.

=== 2018 Wimbledon semifinal ===
In one of the most anticipated matches of the tournament and their rivalry, Djokovic defeated Nadal in a thrilling five set match, lasting 5 hours, 15 minutes and played over two days. The match was highly anticipated early on, as Nadal, the world No. 1, had not progressed beyond the fourth round at Wimbledon since 2011 (where he lost to Djokovic in the final), and Djokovic on the other hand was recovering from a long elbow injury and had dropped down in the rankings. Nadal was considered the favourite due to his far superior form that year, riding a 17-match winning streak heading into the match, including a straight-set victory over Djokovic at the Italian Open, with Nadal's coach, Francisco Roig, considering him to be the "slightly favorite" going into the match.

Due to delay caused by a six-and-half hour semifinal between Kevin Anderson and John Isner, the match started in the late Friday evening. Djokovic and Nadal won the first and second sets respectively. The third set entered the tiebreak and Djokovic saved three set points to win the set. As Wimbledon does not permit match play after 11:00 p.m, the match was halted after three sets. The fourth set, played next day, featured a lot of break point opportunities for both players, with the opening game lasting over 15 minutes and six deuces, with Nadal saving two break points, showing just how close the match was. Eventually it was Nadal who took the set. In the fifth set, both players held serve for the first 17 games, despite Nadal having break points in games 9 and 15, and Djokovic in games 8 and 16. The 15th game was also long, lasting over 10 minutes, going to five deuces and Djokovic saving three break points. Nadal saved a match point in the sixteenth game with a drop shot. In the end, Djokovic broke Nadal's serve at love to seal the match.

Nadal said "I think I played a great match", adding that he had "hit great shots", "played aggressive", "gave it [his] best", and had "not much more inside me", before concluding, "It's fair to say that was a great match and he beat me. Well done for him." Djokovic said he was "overwhelmed" after defeating "the best player in the world" in what he described as "one of the best matches I've ever played", adding that it "really could have gone either way", that "until the last shot I didn't know if I'm going to win", and that "These kind of matches, you live for, you work for."

A Washington Post article describing both of the Wimbledon semifinals stated that "One semifinal was a beauty — tennis at its fully committed best — in which Djokovic and world No. 1 Rafael Nadal staged a dazzling display of shot-making, tactical acumen, defensive wizardry and exceptional athleticism before Djokovic prevailed". Tennis historian Steve Flink stated that "Djokovic’s triumph over Nadal in the Wimbledon semifinals must rank as one of the greatest and most crucial of his career." Tennis journalist Scoop Malinowski argued that it might have been the greatest match ever played. The match is seen as Djokovic's return to the top, as Novak himself in 2019 credited the match as the turning point of his comeback and with giving him “a different, more confident self.” In 2023, it was listed by Tennis.com as one of the key matches in the "GOAT race" for most Grand Slam titles between the Big Three.

It was the third-most games Djokovic has played in a fifth set, at 10–8, after his 12–10 fifth-set victory against Stan Wawrinka at the 2013 Australian Open, and later his 13–12 tiebreak fifth-set victory against Roger Federer in the 2019 Wimbledon Championships final. Whereas it was the second-most games that Nadal has played in a fifth set, after his 13–15 fifth set defeat to Gilles Muller at the 2017 Wimbledon Championships. Djokovic ended Nadal's 16 consecutive Grand Slam semifinal win streak, dating back to the 2010 French Open, along with it being Nadal's first Grand Slam semifinal loss of the decade, and his first loss in a Wimbledon semifinal. The loss also snapped Nadal's 17-match winning streak dating back to the 2018 Italian Open. It was the second longest semifinal in Wimbledon history.

The match is considered one of the greatest of all time, and among the finest matches in the history of Wimbledon. The match was praised for the high quality and intensity shown throughout. The match was also considered to be the de facto final. It was the second longest semifinal in Wimbledon history.

=== 2021 French Open semifinal ===
In the most anticipated match of the tournament, Djokovic defeated four-time defending champion Nadal in a bruising four set encounter, lasting 4 hours, 11 minutes. Nadal raced into a 5–0 lead, taking the first set 6–3, only for Djokovic to level, taking the second set by the same scoreline. The third set, lasting 97 minutes, was described as one of the greatest sets ever, which Djokovic took on a tiebreak after surviving a set point. Despite Nadal taking a 2–0 lead in the fourth set, Djokovic won the next six games, to hand Nadal just his third ever defeat at the French Open in his 108th match at the tournament and ending his 35-match winning streak, the second highest in the tournament's history.

It was Nadal's first loss in a French Open semifinal, having previously been 13–0 prior to the match. It was also the only match that Nadal lost at the French Open after having won the first set. Djokovic would go on to win the title, becoming the first man in the Open Era to win each of the four Grand Slams on multiple occasions. The match was praised by many as the best of the season. Some deemed it to be the greatest match that had ever been played following its conclusion. Djokovic praised the match as being the best he had ever played in the French Open. During the match, Andy Murray stated that "You cannot play better clay court tennis than this. It's perfect", while Darren Cahill stated that it was "One of the very best matches I've seen. Well done to Novak and Rafa. Brilliant tennis."

== List of all matches ==
ATP, ATP Cup, Davis Cup, and Grand Slam tournament main draw results included.

Legend (2006–2008)	Legend (2009–present)	Djokovic	Nadal
Grand Slam		7	11
Tennis Masters Cup	ATP World Tour Finals	3	2
ATP Masters Series	ATP World Tour Masters 1000	16	13
ATP International Series Gold	ATP World Tour 500 Series	2	0
ATP International Series	ATP World Tour 250 Series	1	1
Davis Cup		0	1
ATP Cup		1	0
Olympic Games		1	1
Total		31	29

=== Singles (60) ===
Djokovic 31 – Nadal 29

No.	Year	Tournament	Series	Surface	Round	Winner	Score	Length	Sets	Djokovic	Nadal
1	2006	French Open	Major	Clay	Quarterfinals	Nadal	6–4, 6–4, 0–0 (ret.)	1:54	3/5	0	1
2	2007	Indian Wells Masters	Masters	Hard	Final	Nadal	6–2, 7–5	1:34	2/3	0	2
3	2007	Miami Open	Masters	Hard	Quarterfinals	Djokovic	6–3, 6–4	1:37	2/3	1	2
4	2007	Italian Open	Masters	Clay	Quarterfinals	Nadal	6–2, 6–3	1:41	2/3	1	3
5	2007	French Open	Major	Clay	Semifinals	Nadal	7–5, 6–4, 6–2	2:28	3/5	1	4
6	2007	Wimbledon	Major	Grass	Semifinals	Nadal	3–6, 6–1, 4–1 (ret.)	1:41	3/5	1	5
7	2007	Canadian Open	Masters	Hard	Semifinals	Djokovic	7–5, 6–3	1:51	2/3	2	5
8	2007	Tennis Masters Cup	Tour Finals	Hard (i)	Round Robin	Nadal	6–4, 6–4	1:44	2/3	2	6
9	2008	Indian Wells Masters	Masters	Hard	Semifinals	Djokovic	6–3, 6–2	1:28	2/3	3	6
10	2008	Hamburg Masters	Masters	Clay	Semifinals	Nadal	7–5, 2–6, 6–2	3:03	3/3	3	7
11	2008	French Open	Major	Clay	Semifinals	Nadal	6–4, 6–2, 7–6^{(7–3)}	2:49	3/5	3	8
12	2008	Queen's Club	250	Grass	Final	Nadal	7–6^{(8–6)}, 7–5	2:16	2/3	3	9
13	2008	Cincinnati Masters	Masters	Hard	Semifinals	Djokovic	6–1, 7–5	1:26	2/3	4	9
14	2008	Summer Olympics	Olympics	Hard	Semifinals	Nadal	6–4, 1–6, 6–4	2:10	3/3	4	10
15	2009	Davis Cup	Team	Clay	First round – singles rubber	Nadal	6–4, 6–4, 6–1	2:28	3/5	4	11
16	2009	Monte-Carlo Masters	Masters	Clay	Final	Nadal	6–3, 2–6, 6–1	2:43	3/3	4	12
17	2009	Italian Open	Masters	Clay	Final	Nadal	7–6^{(7–2)}, 6–2	2:03	2/3	4	13
18	2009	Madrid Open	Masters	Clay	Semifinals	Nadal	3–6, 7–6^{(7–5)}, 7–6^{(11–9)}	4:03	3/3	4	14
19	2009	Cincinnati Masters	Masters	Hard	Semifinals	Djokovic	6–1, 6–4	1:32	2/3	5	14
20	2009	Paris Masters	Masters	Hard (i)	Semifinals	Djokovic	6–2, 6–3	1:17	2/3	6	14
21	2009	ATP World Tour Finals	Tour Finals	Hard (i)	Round Robin	Djokovic	7–6^{(7–5)}, 6–3	1:58	2/3	7	14
22	2010	US Open	Major	Hard	Final	Nadal	6–4, 5–7, 6–4, 6–2	3:43	4/5	7	15
23	2010	ATP World Tour Finals	Tour Finals	Hard (i)	Round Robin	Nadal	7–5, 6–2	1:52	2/3	7	16
24	2011	Indian Wells Masters	Masters	Hard	Final	Djokovic	4–6, 6–3, 6–2	2:25	3/3	8	16
25	2011	Miami Open	Masters	Hard	Final	Djokovic	4–6, 6–3, 7–6^{(7–4)}	3:21	3/3	9	16
26	2011	Madrid Open	Masters	Clay	Final	Djokovic	7–5, 6–4	2:17	2/3	10	16
27	2011	Italian Open	Masters	Clay	Final	Djokovic	6–4, 6–4	2:12	2/3	11	16
28	2011	Wimbledon	Major	Grass	Final	Djokovic	6–4, 6–1, 1–6, 6–3	2:28	4/5	12	16
29	2011	US Open	Major	Hard	Final	Djokovic	6–2, 6–4, 6–7^{(3–7)}, 6–1	4:10	4/5	13	16
30	2012	Australian Open	Major	Hard	Final	Djokovic	5–7, 6–4, 6–2, 6–7^{(5–7)}, 7–5	5:53	5/5	14	16
31	2012	Monte-Carlo Masters	Masters	Clay	Final	Nadal	6–3, 6–1	1:18	2/3	14	17
32	2012	Italian Open	Masters	Clay	Final	Nadal	7–5, 6–3	2:20	2/3	14	18
33	2012	French Open	Major	Clay	Final	Nadal	6–4, 6–3, 2–6, 7–5	3:49	4/5	14	19
34	2013	Monte-Carlo Masters	Masters	Clay	Final	Djokovic	6–2, 7–6^{(7–1)}	1:52	2/3	15	19
35	2013	French Open	Major	Clay	Semifinals	Nadal	6–4, 3–6, 6–1, 6–7^{(3–7)}, 9–7	4:37	5/5	15	20
36	2013	Canadian Open	Masters	Hard	Semifinals	Nadal	6–4, 3–6, 7–6^{(7–2)}	2:28	3/3	15	21
37	2013	US Open	Major	Hard	Final	Nadal	6–2, 3–6, 6–4, 6–1	3:21	4/5	15	22
38	2013	China Open	500	Hard	Final	Djokovic	6–3, 6–4	1:27	2/3	16	22
39	2013	ATP World Tour Finals	Tour Finals	Hard (i)	Final	Djokovic	6–3, 6–4	1:36	2/3	17	22
40	2014	Miami Open	Masters	Hard	Final	Djokovic	6–3, 6–3	1:23	2/3	18	22
41	2014	Italian Open	Masters	Clay	Final	Djokovic	4–6, 6–3, 6–3	2:19	3/3	19	22
42	2014	French Open	Major	Clay	Final	Nadal	3–6, 7–5, 6–2, 6–4	3:31	4/5	19	23
43	2015	Monte-Carlo Masters	Masters	Clay	Semifinals	Djokovic	6–3, 6–3	1:37	2/3	20	23
44	2015	French Open	Major	Clay	Quarterfinals	Djokovic	7–5, 6–3, 6–1	2:27	3/5	21	23
45	2015	China Open	500	Hard	Final	Djokovic	6–2, 6–2	1:30	2/3	22	23
46	2015	ATP World Tour Finals	Tour Finals	Hard (i)	Semifinals	Djokovic	6–3, 6–3	1:19	2/3	23	23
47	2016	Qatar Open	250	Hard	Final	Djokovic	6–1, 6–2	1:13	2/3	24	23
48	2016	Indian Wells Masters	Masters	Hard	Semifinals	Djokovic	7–6^{(7–5)}, 6–2	1:58	2/3	25	23
49	2016	Italian Open	Masters	Clay	Quarterfinals	Djokovic	7–5, 7–6^{(7–4)}	2:25	2/3	26	23
50	2017	Madrid Open	Masters	Clay	Semifinals	Nadal	6–2, 6–4	1:39	2/3	26	24
51	2018	Italian Open	Masters	Clay	Semifinals	Nadal	7–6^{(7–4)}, 6–3	1:56	2/3	26	25
52	2018	Wimbledon	Major	Grass	Semifinals	Djokovic	6–4, 3–6, 7–6^{(11–9)}, 3–6, 10–8	5:15	5/5	27	25
53	2019	Australian Open	Major	Hard	Final	Djokovic	6–3, 6–2, 6–3	2:04	3/5	28	25
54	2019	Italian Open	Masters	Clay	Final	Nadal	6–0, 4–6, 6–1	2:29	3/3	28	26
55	2020	ATP Cup	Team	Hard	Final – singles rubber	Djokovic	6–2, 7–6^{(7–4)}	1:55	2/3	29	26
56	2020	French Open	Major	Clay	Final	Nadal	6–0, 6–2, 7–5	2:41	3/5	29	27
57	2021	Italian Open	Masters	Clay	Final	Nadal	7–5, 1–6, 6–3	2:49	3/3	29	28
58	2021	French Open	Major	Clay	Semifinals	Djokovic	3–6, 6–3, 7–6^{(7–4)}, 6–2	4:11	4/5	30	28
59	2022	French Open	Major	Clay	Quarterfinals	Nadal	6–2, 4–6, 6–2, 7–6^{(7–4)}	4:12	4/5	30	29
60	2024	Summer Olympics	Olympics	Clay	Second round	Djokovic	6–1, 6–4	1:43	2/3	31	29

=== Doubles ===
Djokovic–Nadal (0–2)

No.	Year	Tournament	Series	Surface	Round	Winner	Score	Opponents	Djokovic	Nadal
1	2009	Canadian Open	Masters	Hard	Last 32	Nadal/Roig	7–5, 6–4	Djokovic/Vemić	0	1
2	2015	Qatar Open	250	Hard	Semifinals	Nadal/Mónaco	7–6^{(7–3)}, 6–1	Djokovic/Krajinović	0	2

As a pair (0–1)

No.	Year	Tournament	Series	Surface	Round	Pair	Score	Opponents	Wins	Losses
1	2010	Canadian Open	Masters	Hard	Last 32	Djokovic/Nadal	7–5, 3–6, [8–10]	Pospisil/Raonic	0	1

=== Exhibitions ===
In Bogotá on 21 March 2011, Nadal beat Djokovic in their first exhibition match and the highest caliber match ever played in Colombia. A second exhibition, with proceeds to benefit a foundation run by Nadal and the football team Real Madrid, was scheduled for July 14, 2012 in Real Madrid's Santiago Bernabéu Stadium, but cancelled because of injury to Nadal.

Djokovic—Nadal (4–3)

No.	Year	Tournament	Surface	Round	Winner	Score
1	2011	(Colombia) Bogotá	Hard (i)	Exhibition	Nadal	7–6^{(7–5)}, 6–3
2	2013	(Chile) Santiago	Hard (i)	Exhibition	Djokovic	7–6^{(7–3)}, 6–4
3	2013	(Argentina) Buenos Aires	Hard	Exhibition	Nadal	6–4, 7–5
4	2015	(Thailand) Bangkok	Hard (i)	Exhibition	Djokovic	6–4, 6–2
5	2016	(Italy) Milan	Hard (i)	Exhibition	Djokovic	6–4, 6–4
6	2019	(Kazakhstan) Nur-Sultan	Hard (i)	Exhibition	Nadal	6–3, 3–6, [11–9]
7	2024	(Saudi Arabia) Riyadh	Hard (i)	3rd place match	Djokovic	6–2, 7–6^{(7–5)}

== Djokovic–Nadal era ==
=== Combined singles performance timeline (best result) ===
Key
W	F	SF	QF	#R	RR	Q#	DNQ	A	NH

(W) winner; (F) finalist; (SF) semifinalist; (QF) quarterfinalist; (#R) rounds 4, 3, 2, 1; (RR) round-robin stage; (Q#) qualification round; (DNQ) did not qualify; (A) absent; (NH) not held; (SR) strike rate (events won / competed); (W–L) win–loss record.

Tournament	2003	2004	2005	2006	2007	2008	2009	2010	2011	2012	2013	2014	2015	2016	2017	2018	2019	2020	2021	2022	2023	2024	2025	SR
Grand Slam tournaments
Australian Open	A	3R^{N}	4R^{N}	1R^{D}	QF^{N}	W^{D}	W^{N}	QF^{ND}	W^{D}	W^{D}	W^{D}	F^{N}	W^{D}	W^{D}	F^{N}	QF^{N}	W^{D}	W^{D}	W^{D}	W^{N}	W^{D}	SF^{D}	SF^{D}	12 / 22
French Open	A	A	W^{N}	W^{N}	W^{N}	W^{N}	4R^{N}	W^{N}	W^{N}	W^{N}	W^{N}	W^{N}	F^{D}	W^{D}	W^{N}	W^{N}	W^{N}	W^{N}	W^{D}	W^{N}	W^{D}	QF^{D}	SF^{D}	17 / 21
Wimbledon	3R^{N}	A	3R^{D}	F^{N}	F^{N}	W^{N}	QF^{D}	W^{N}	W^{D}	SF^{D}	F^{D}	W^{D}	W^{D}	3R^{D}	QF^{D}	W^{D}	W^{D}	NH^{1}	W^{D}	W^{D}	F^{D}	F^{D}	SF^{D}	9 / 21
US Open	2R^{N}	2R^{N}	3R^{ND}	QF^{N}	F^{D}	SF^{ND}	SF^{ND}	W^{N}	W^{D}	F^{D}	W^{N}	SF^{D}	W^{D}	F^{D}	W^{N}	W^{D}	W^{N}	4R^{D}	F^{D}	4R^{N}	W^{D}	3R^{D}	SF^{D}	8 / 23
Year-end championships
ATP Finals	DNQ		A	SF	SF	W^{D}	RR	F	RR	W^{D}	W^{D}	W^{D}	W^{D}	F	RR	F	RR	SF	SF	W^{D}	W^{D}	A	A	7 / 18
ATP Tour Masters 1000
Indian Wells	A	3R	A	SF	W^{N}	W^{D}	W^{N}	SF	W^{D}	SF	W^{N}	W^{D}	W^{D}	W^{D}	4R	2R	SF	NH^{1}	A	F	A	3R	2R	8 / 18
Miami	A	4R	F	2R	W^{D}	F	F	SF	W^{D}	W^{D}	4R	W^{D}	W^{D}	W^{D}	F	2R	4R	NH^{1}	A	A	A	A	F	6 / 17
Monte Carlo	3R	A	W^{N}	W^{N}	W^{N}	W^{N}	W^{N}	W^{N}	W^{N}	W^{N}	W^{D}	SF	W^{D}	W^{N}	W^{N}	W^{N}	SF	NH^{1}	QF	2R	3R	SF	2R	13 / 21
Madrid^{1}	3R	A	A	2R	F	W^{N}	F	W^{N}	W^{D}	QF	W^{N}	W^{N}	F	W^{D}	W^{N}	QF	W^{D}	NH^{1}	QF	SF	A	4R	2R	8 / 19
Rome	A	A	W^{N}	W^{N}	W^{N}	W^{D}	W^{N}	W^{N}	W^{D}	W^{N}	W^{N}	W^{D}	W^{D}	F	F	W^{N}	W^{N}	W^{D}	W^{N}	W^{D}	QF	3R	A	16 / 20
Canada	A	1R	W^{N}	3R	W^{D}	W^{N}	QF	SF	W^{D}	W^{D}	W^{N}	3R	F	W^{D}	3R	W^{N}	W^{N}	NH^{1}	A	A	A	A	A	9 / 16
Cincinnati	A	1R	1R	QF	2R	F	F	QF	F	F	W^{N}	3R	F	3R	QF	W^{D}	SF	W^{D}	A	2R	W^{D}	A	A	4 / 19
Shanghai^{2}	1R	2R	W^{N}	QF	SF	SF	F	SF	3R	W^{D}	W^{D}	SF	W^{D}	SF	F	W^{D}	QF	NH^{1}			A	F	SF	5 / 19
Paris	Q1	A	3R	2R	F	QF	W^{D}	3R	QF	2R	W^{D}	W^{D}	W^{D}	QF	QF	F	W^{D}	SF	W^{D}	F	W^{D}	A	A	7 / 19

^{1} Tournament cancelled due to the COVID-19 pandemic.

=== Grand Slam tournaments ===
Year	Australian Open	French Open	Wimbledon	US Open
2005	(Russia) Marat Safin	(Spain) Rafael Nadal	(Switzerland) Roger Federer	(Switzerland) Roger Federer
2006	(Switzerland) Roger Federer	(Spain) Rafael Nadal	(Switzerland) Roger Federer	(Switzerland) Roger Federer
2007	(Switzerland) Roger Federer	(Spain) Rafael Nadal	(Switzerland) Roger Federer	(Switzerland) Roger Federer
2008	(Serbia) Novak Djokovic	(Spain) Rafael Nadal	(Spain) Rafael Nadal	(Switzerland) Roger Federer
2009	(Spain) Rafael Nadal	(Switzerland) Roger Federer	(Switzerland) Roger Federer	(Argentina) Juan Martín del Potro
2010	(Switzerland) Roger Federer	(Spain) Rafael Nadal	(Spain) Rafael Nadal	(Spain) Rafael Nadal
2011	(Serbia) Novak Djokovic	(Spain) Rafael Nadal	(Serbia) Novak Djokovic	(Serbia) Novak Djokovic
2012	(Serbia) Novak Djokovic	(Spain) Rafael Nadal	(Switzerland) Roger Federer	(United Kingdom) Andy Murray
2013	(Serbia) Novak Djokovic	(Spain) Rafael Nadal	(United Kingdom) Andy Murray	(Spain) Rafael Nadal
2014	(Switzerland) Stan Wawrinka	(Spain) Rafael Nadal	(Serbia) Novak Djokovic	(Croatia) Marin Čilić
2015	(Serbia) Novak Djokovic	(Switzerland) Stan Wawrinka	(Serbia) Novak Djokovic	(Serbia) Novak Djokovic
2016	(Serbia) Novak Djokovic	(Serbia) Novak Djokovic	(United Kingdom) Andy Murray	(Switzerland) Stan Wawrinka
2017	(Switzerland) Roger Federer	(Spain) Rafael Nadal	(Switzerland) Roger Federer	(Spain) Rafael Nadal
2018	(Switzerland) Roger Federer	(Spain) Rafael Nadal	(Serbia) Novak Djokovic	(Serbia) Novak Djokovic
2019	(Serbia) Novak Djokovic	(Spain) Rafael Nadal	(Serbia) Novak Djokovic	(Spain) Rafael Nadal
2020	(Serbia) Novak Djokovic	(Spain) Rafael Nadal	Tournament cancelled	(Austria) Dominic Thiem
2021	(Serbia) Novak Djokovic	(Serbia) Novak Djokovic	(Serbia) Novak Djokovic	(Russia) Daniil Medvedev
2022	(Spain) Rafael Nadal	(Spain) Rafael Nadal	(Serbia) Novak Djokovic	(Spain) Carlos Alcaraz
2023	(Serbia) Novak Djokovic	(Serbia) Novak Djokovic	(Spain) Carlos Alcaraz	(Serbia) Novak Djokovic

Due to the COVID-19 pandemic, the 2020 Wimbledon Championships were cancelled.

=== ATP No. 1 era ===
Player	Start date	End date	Weeks	Total
(Spain) Rafael Nadal	18 August 2008	5 July 2009	46	46
(Switzerland) Roger Federer (2)	6 July 2009	6 June 2010	48	285
(Spain) Rafael Nadal (2)	7 June 2010	3 July 2011	56	102
(Serbia) Novak Djokovic	4 July 2011	8 July 2012	53	53
(Switzerland) Roger Federer (3)	9 July 2012	4 November 2012	17	302
(Serbia) Novak Djokovic (2)	5 November 2012	6 October 2013	48	101
(Spain) Rafael Nadal (3)	7 October 2013	6 July 2014	39	141
(Serbia) Novak Djokovic (3)	7 July 2014	6 November 2016	122	223
(United Kingdom) Andy Murray	7 November 2016	20 August 2017	41	41
(Spain) Rafael Nadal (4)	21 August 2017	18 February 2018	26	167
(Switzerland) Roger Federer (4)	19 February 2018	1 April 2018	6	308
(Spain) Rafael Nadal (5)	2 April 2018	13 May 2018	6	173
(Switzerland) Roger Federer (5)	14 May 2018	20 May 2018	1	309
(Spain) Rafael Nadal (6)	21 May 2018	17 June 2018	4	177
(Switzerland) Roger Federer (6)	18 June 2018	24 June 2018	1	310
(Spain) Rafael Nadal (7)	25 June 2018	4 November 2018	19	196
(Serbia) Novak Djokovic (4)	5 November 2018	3 November 2019	52	275
(Spain) Rafael Nadal (8)	4 November 2019	2 February 2020	13	209
(Serbia) Novak Djokovic (5)	3 February 2020	23 March 2020	7	282
ATP ranking was frozen	23 March 2020	23 August 2020	22	22
(Serbia) Novak Djokovic (5)	24 August 2020	27 February 2022	79	361
(Russia) Daniil Medvedev	28 February 2022	20 March 2022	3	3
(Serbia) Novak Djokovic (6)	21 March 2022	12 June 2022	12	373
(Russia) Daniil Medvedev (2)	13 June 2022	11 September 2022	13	16
(Spain) Carlos Alcaraz	12 September 2022	29 January 2023	20	20
(Serbia) Novak Djokovic (7)	30 January 2023	19 March 2023	7	380
(Spain) Carlos Alcaraz (2)	20 March 2023	2 April 2023	2	22
(Serbia) Novak Djokovic (8)	3 April 2023	21 May 2023	7	387
(Spain) Carlos Alcaraz (3)	22 May 2023	11 June 2023	3	25
(Serbia) Novak Djokovic (9)	12 June 2023	25 June 2023	2	389
(Spain) Carlos Alcaraz (4)	26 June 2023	10 September 2023	11	36
(Serbia) Novak Djokovic (10)	11 September 2023	9 June 2024	39	428^{‡}

^{‡}Represents ATP rankings record.

== Significant achievements ==
- Only two male players in the Open Era to play 60 matches against one another
- Only two male players in the Open Era to play 28 finals against each other
- Only two male players to win 59+ Big Titles
- Only two male players to win 22+ Grand Slam titles
- Only two male players to win a single Grand Slam at least 10 times, Nadal in the French Open, Djokovic in the Australian Open
- Only two male players to win 36+ Masters titles
- Only two male players to complete multiple Career Grand Slams across three different surfaces
- Only two male players to achieve a Surface Slam
- Most Grand Slam tournament meetings – 18
- Most Grand Slam tournament finals – 9 (tied with Federer–Nadal)
- Only two players to have played each other 29 times in ATP Masters tournaments
- Only two players to have played each other 10 times in a single tournament (French Open)
- Longest titles streak at one Masters tournament (Rome) with 11 consecutive titles, 2005–2015, Nadal 7 titles, Djokovic 4 titles
- Longest finals streak at one Masters tournament (Rome) with 18 consecutive finals, 2005–2022
- Only two players to hold all 9 ATP Masters titles at once between them (2013 Monte-Carlo to 2014 Miami), Djokovic 5 titles, Nadal 4 titles
- Longest Grand Slam final ever played (2012 Australian Open) at 5 hours and 53 minutes
- Longest three-set match of the Open Era with tie-break in deciding set (at the 2009 Madrid Masters)
- Only male pair to have met in four consecutive Grand Slam finals (2011 Wimbledon–2012 French Open)
- First male pair to have met in each of the four Grand Slam finals (since matched by Djokovic and Murray)
- Most consecutive seasons in the Open Era playing a Grand Slam final (5), from 2010 to 2014
- Doubles team made up of singles No. 1 and No. 2 (shared with Connors and Ashe)
- Djokovic and Nadal hold the all-time record of titles in their respective favoured Grand Slam tournaments. Nadal's at the French Open and Djokovic at the Australian Open.
- First pair to win Grand Slams in three different decades: 2000s, 2010s, 2020s
- Oldest pair in the Open Era to play the French Open final (in 2020), with Nadal aged 34 and Djokovic aged 33 to put them at a combined age of 67

== Performance timeline comparison ==
=== Grand Slam tournaments ===
Key
**W**	F	SF	QF	#R	RR	Q#	DNQ	A	NH

(W) winner; (F) finalist; (SF) semifinalist; (QF) quarterfinalist; (#R) rounds 4, 3, 2, 1; (RR) round-robin stage; (Q#) qualification round; (DNQ) did not qualify; (A) absent; (NH) not held; (SR) strike rate (events won / competed); (W–L) win–loss record.
- **Bold** indicates players met during the tournament.

==== 2005–2010 ====
Player	2005				2006				2007				2008				2009				2010			
Player	AUS	FRA	WIM	USA	AUS	FRA	WIM	USA	AUS	FRA	WIM	USA	AUS	FRA	WIM	USA	AUS	FRA	WIM	USA	AUS	FRA	WIM	USA
(Serbia) **Novak Djokovic**	1R	2R	3R	3R	1R	**QF**	4R	3R	4R	**SF**	**SF**	F	W	**SF**	2R	SF	QF	3R	QF	SF	QF	QF	SF	**F**
(Spain) **Rafael Nadal**	4R	W	2R	3R	A	**W**	F	QF	QF	**W**	**F**	4R	SF	**W**	W	SF	W	4R	A	SF	QF	W	W	**W**

==== 2011–2016 ====
Player	2011				2012				2013				2014				2015				2016			
Player	AUS	FRA	WIM	USA	AUS	FRA	WIM	USA	AUS	FRA	WIM	USA	AUS	FRA	WIM	USA	AUS	FRA	WIM	USA	AUS	FRA	WIM	USA
(Serbia) **Novak Djokovic**	W	SF	**W**	**W**	**W**	**F**	SF	F	W	**SF**	F	**F**	QF	**F**	W	SF	W	**F**	W	W	W	W	3R	F
(Spain) **Rafael Nadal**	QF	W	**F**	**F**	**F**	**W**	2R	A	A	**W**	1R	**W**	F	**W**	4R	A	QF	**QF**	2R	3R	1R	3R	A	4R

==== 2017–2022 ====
Player	2017				2018				2019				2020				2021				2022			
Player	AUS	FRA	WIM	USA	AUS	FRA	WIM	USA	AUS	FRA	WIM	USA	AUS	WIM	USA	FRA	AUS	FRA	WIM	USA	AUS	FRA	WIM	USA
(Serbia) **Novak Djokovic**	2R	QF	QF	A	4R	QF	**W**	W	**W**	SF	W	4R	W	NH	4R	**F**	W	**W**	W	F	A	**QF**	W	A
(Spain) **Rafael Nadal**	F	W	4R	W	QF	W	**SF**	SF	**F**	W	SF	W	QF	NH	A	**W**	QF	**SF**	A	A	W	**W**	SF	4R

==== 2023–present ====
Player	2023				2024				2025			
Player	AUS	FRA	WIM	USA	AUS	FRA	WIM	USA	AUS	FRA	WIM	USA
(Serbia) **Novak Djokovic**	W	W	F	W	SF	QF	F	3R	SF	SF	SF	SF
(Spain) **Rafael Nadal**	2R	A	A	A	A	1R	A	A	—N/a	—N/a	—N/a	—N/a

=== ATP rankings ===
==== Year-end ranking timeline ====
Player	2001	2002	2003	2004	2005	2006	2007	2008	2009	2010	2011	2012	2013	2014	2015	2016	2017	2018	2019	2020	2021	2022	2023	2024
(Serbia) Novak Djokovic			679	186	78	16	3	3	3	3	**1**	**1**	2	**1**	**1**	2	12	**1**	2	**1**	**1**	5	**1**	7
(Spain) Rafael Nadal	811	200	49	51	2	2	2	**1**	2	**1**	2	4	**1**	3	5	9	**1**	2	**1**	2	6	2	670	153

== Career evolution ==
- updated Monday, 2 February 2026

Age (end of season)		18	19	20	21	22	23	24	25	26	27	28	29	30	31	32	33	34	35	36	37	38	39
(Serbia) Djokovic's season		2005	2006	2007	2008	2009	2010	2011	2012	2013	2014	2015	2016	2017	2018	2019	2020	2021	2022	2023	2024	2025	2026
(Spain) Nadal's season		2004	2005	2006	2007	2008	2009	2010	2011	2012	2013	2014	2015	2016	2017	2018	2019	2020	2021	2022	2023	2024	2025
Grand Slam titles	Djokovic	0	0	0	1	1	1	4	5	6	7	10	12	12	14	16	17	20	21	24	24	24	(24)
Grand Slam titles	Nadal	0	1	2	3	5	6	9	10	11	13	14	14	14	16	17	19	20	20	22	22	22	
Grand Slam finals	Djokovic	0	0	1	2	2	3	6	9	12	14	18	21	21	23	25	27	31	32	36	37	37	(38)
Grand Slam finals	Nadal	0	1	3	5	7	8	11	14	16	18	20	20	20	23	24	27	28	28	30	30	30	
Grand Slam match wins	Djokovic	5	14	33	51	66	85	110	134	158	180	207	228	237	258	280	296	323	334	361	377	397	(402)
Grand Slam match wins	Nadal	6	19	36	56	80	95	120	143	157	171	187	198	203	226	247	271	282	291	313	314	314	
ATP Finals titles	Djokovic	0	0	0	1	1	1	1	2	3	4	5	5	5	5	5	5	5	6	7	7	7	(7)
ATP Finals titles	Nadal	0	0	0	0	0	0	0	0	0	0	0	0	0	0	0	0	0	0	0	0	0	
ATP Masters titles	Djokovic	0	0	2	4	5	5	10	13	16	20	26	30	30	32	34	36	37	38	40	40	40	(40)
ATP Masters titles	Nadal	0	4	6	9	12	15	18	19	21	26	27	27	28	30	33	35	35	36	36	36	36	
Total titles	Djokovic	0	2	7	11	16	18	28	34	41	48	59	66	68	72	77	81	86	91	98	99	101	(101)
Total titles	Nadal	1	12	17	23	31	36	43	46	50	60	64	67	69	75	80	84	86	88	92	92	92	
Total match wins	Djokovic	13	53	121	185	263	324	394	469	543	604	686	751	783	836	893	934	989	1031	1087	1124	1163	(1168)
Total match wins	Nadal	45	124	183	253	335	401	472	541	583	658	706	767	806	873	919	977	1004	1028	1067	1068	1080	
Ranking	Djokovic	78	16	3	3	3	3	1	1	2	1	1	2	12	1	2	1	1	5	1	7	4	(3)
Ranking	Nadal	51	2	2	2	1	2	1	2	4	1	3	5	9	1	2	1	2	6	2	670	153	
Weeks at No. 1	Djokovic	0	0	0	0	0	0	26	62	101	127	179	223	223	232	275	301	353	373	405	428	428	(428)
Weeks at No. 1	Nadal	0	0	0	0	19	46	76	102	102	115	141	141	141	160	196	205	209	209	209	209	209	
Year-end No. 1 finishes	Djokovic	0	0	0	0	0	0	1	2	2	3	4	4	4	5	5	6	7	7	8	8	8	(8)
Year-end No. 1 finishes	Nadal	0	0	0	0	1	1	2	2	2	3	3	3	3	4	4	5	5	5	5	5	5	

== See also ==
- Big Three
- List of tennis rivalries
- Federer–Nadal rivalry
- Djokovic–Federer rivalry
- Djokovic–Murray rivalry
- Rafael Nadal career statistics
- Novak Djokovic career statistics
- List of Grand Slam men's singles champions
