= 2012 Australian Open – Men's singles final =

Longest Grand Slam final match

2012 Australian Open Men's Final
- (Serbia) Novak Djokovic (1) vs. (Spain) Rafael Nadal (2)
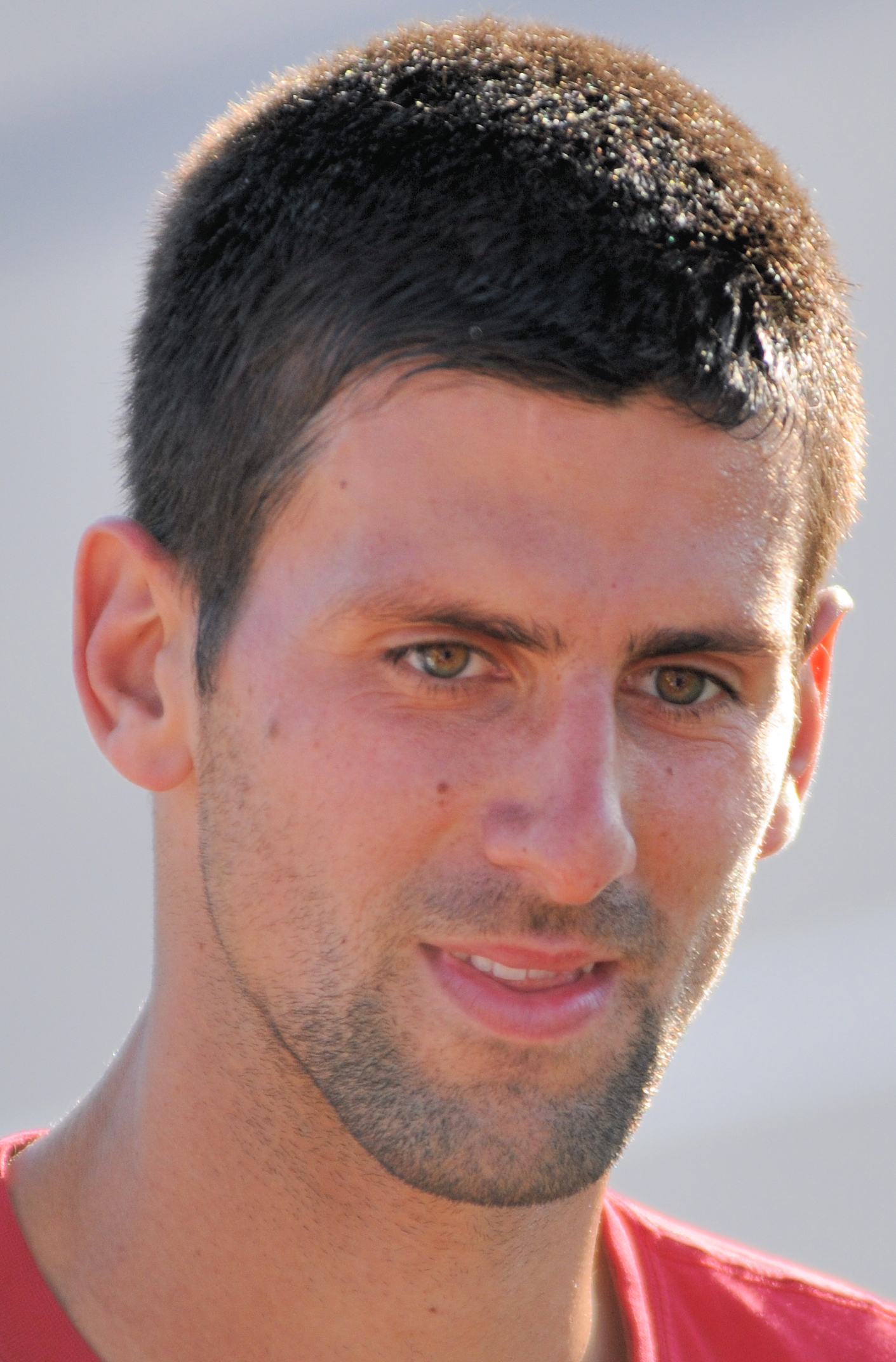
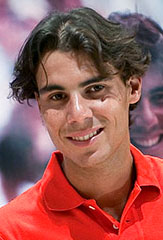
- Novak Djokovic (left) and Rafael Nadal (right)
Set	1	2	3	4	5
(Serbia) Novak Djokovic	5	6	6	6^{5}	7
(Spain) Rafael Nadal	7	4	2	7^{7}	5
- Date: Sunday, 29 January 2012
- Tournament: Australian Open
- Location: Melbourne, Australia
- Chair umpire: Pascal Maria
- Duration: 5 hours 53 minutes

The 2012 Australian Open Men's Singles final was the championship tennis match of the men's singles tournament at the 2012 Australian Open between Novak Djokovic and Rafael Nadal, at the time ranked the number 1 and 2 players in the world, respectively. A defining match in the Djokovic–Nadal rivalry, the Serb defeated the Spaniard 5–7, 6–4, 6–2, 6–7^{(5–7)}, 7–5 to win the tournament. It was both the longest Australian Open match and the longest major final match (by duration) in history, lasting 5 hours 53 minutes, overtaking the record previously set by the 1988 US Open final between Mats Wilander and Ivan Lendl. It is considered by some to be the greatest and most physical tennis match of all time. With both players at their highest levels, the match was regarded as a war of attrition with impeccable quality throughout the duration of play. It was the only time that Nadal lost a major final after winning the first set. The defeat also marks the first, and so far only, time that a man has lost in three consecutive major finals (with Djokovic defeating Nadal in the preceding Wimbledon and US Open finals).

Before this final, Djokovic had played an epic semifinal match against the world No. 4 and Australian Open runner-up of the previous two years, Andy Murray, which also went five sets, lasting 4 hours and 50 minutes.

== Background ==
Heading into the match, Djokovic and Nadal were the top two players in the world, with Djokovic coming off of his breakthrough 2011 season, considered one of the greatest seasons ever. Djokovic went 6–0 in matches against Nadal in the 2011 season, all in finals in Big Title events. Djokovic was a two-time titlist at the Australian Open, in 2008 and 2011, and therefore was the defending champion, while Nadal had previously won the Australian Open in 2009. It was Nadal's fourth consecutive major final, which he would later extend to his personal best of five straight at the 2012 French Open, and also marked one of the three times that Nadal reached consecutive hardcourt major finals. On the other hand, it was Djokovic's third consecutive major final, later extending it to four at the 2012 French Open.

Djokovic won his first three matches in straight sets, dropping only one set in the fourth round to former world No. 1 and two-time major champion Lleyton Hewitt, who was a wildcard. Djokovic then beat No. 5 David Ferrer in the quarterfinals in straight sets, No. 4 and Australian Open runner-up of the previous two years, Andy Murray, in a marathon match in the semifinals, which went to five sets and lasted almost five hours, and which was described as the then match of the tournament. Heading into the match, Nadal had won his first four matches in straight-sets, including over Feliciano López in the fourth round who was No. 19 in the world. In the quarterfinals, he beat a peaking Tomáš Berdych in four sets, who was No. 7 in the world, in a match lasting over four hours, and then defeated former four-time Australian Open titlist Roger Federer in the semifinals in four sets, who was No. 3 in the world and riding a 24-match winning streak coming into the match, in a match lasting just under four hours, with both matches being described as high-quality affairs.

Heading into the final, Nadal was attempting to avoid becoming the first man to lose three consecutive major finals in the Open Era, while Djokovic was aiming to become the fifth man after Rod Laver, Pete Sampras, Federer and Nadal to win three majors in a row.

== Match ==
Nadal won the first set 7–5, gaining a break of serve after a long attritional battle. The second set was equally close, with Djokovic breaking first, losing the advantage, and breaking back to win the set 6–4 and level the match at one set each. The third set was the shortest of the match, as Djokovic broke Nadal twice to take the set 6–2. Nevertheless, it was a grueling set that ran 45 minutes, longer than an average set. In this set, Djokovic dropped only two points on serve and broke again in game eight with a crushing forehand to lead for the first time.

Nadal won the fourth set tiebreak, 7–5 after trailing within the set and also down during the closely contested tiebreak; Djokovic had led 5–3 before Nadal took the next four points. The final set saw a return of the intense play seen in the opening sets. Nadal broke in the sixth game to take a 4–2 lead; Djokovic then broke back to level at 4–4. Finally, Djokovic made a decisive break of serve to win what is, in terms of duration, both the longest Grand Slam final in the Open Era and also the longest match in the history of the Australian Open. The match finished at 1:37 am the following morning. Due to exhaustion, both players were given chairs to sit during the trophy presentation speeches.

Despite Djokovic being the slight favorite to win the match beforehand, the favorite fluctuated throughout the match, with Djokovic and Nadal switching being the favorite throughout the match.

== Djokovic and Nadal about the match ==
After the match, Nadal said that "His [Djokovic's] return probably is one of the best in history" and "[He makes it] almost every time". "This one was very special," Nadal said. "But I really understand that was a really special match, and probably a match that's going to be in my mind not because I lost, no, because the way that we played." Nadal also stated that "Physically it was the toughest match I ever played, if not tougher. I am tired".

Djokovic said, "It was obvious on the court for everybody who has watched the match that both of us, physically, we took the last drop of energy that we had from our bodies, we made history tonight and unfortunately there couldn't be two winners". In 2020, Djokovic reiterated that the match was the most grueling and physically exhausting match he ever played.

== Reactions ==
Former world No. 1 Pete Sampras expressed that the match was "by far the greatest match [he] ever saw. Incredible performances from both guys". Former world No. 1 Andre Agassi said, "I think this was the best tennis match ever in the men's game". Former world No. 1 Björn Borg said that "It showed what it takes to beat this top group of players. Truly fantastic match to watch. One of the greatest I’ve ever seen." The tennis historian Steve Flink is quoted as saying to World Tennis that "This was definitely one of the greatest matches of all time – easily one of the ten best since the Open Era of tennis started in 1968." Many congratulated both players for playing the greatest match ever witnessed, and news media also commented on the incredible quality of the match, with sports broadcaster Russell Fuller stating that it was the "most physical and intense sporting event I have ever witnessed". Simon Briggs, writing for The Daily Telegraph, stated "It was certainly the longest, surely the hardest and arguably the greatest Grand Slam final in history." Tennis journalist Scoop Malinowski expressed that "This match was beyond comprehension. I've never seen such an epic display of such talent, stamina and ferocity over the course of six hours".

The final is widely considered to be the greatest hard-court match ever played.

== Legacy ==
This match is central to the Djokovic–Nadal rivalry. Not only was this the longest Grand Slam final, but according to Tennis Channel and the Australian Open TV networks, this was one of the most-watched finals, despite ending late into the night locally. It was the first and only Grand Slam final that Nadal has lost after winning the first set. At the time, it was Nadal's second loss in a Grand Slam match after winning the first set, with his then record slipping to 133–2. As a result of the loss, Nadal became the first man to lose three consecutive Grand Slam finals in the Open Era, all to Djokovic. Djokovic became the fifth man to win three Grand Slams in a row. It also remains the longest match of both Nadal and Djokovic's careers.

In 2015, Nadal chose the final as his favorite memory at the Australian Open over his win in 2009. In 2022, Casper Ruud, a fan of Nadal, stated that if there was one match in the history of tennis he could change, it would be the final in favor of Nadal. In 2023, it was listed by Tennis.com as one of the key matches in the "GOAT race" for most Grand Slam titles between the Big Three.

== Statistics ==
Category	Djokovic	Nadal
1st serve %	98 of 166 = 59%	137 of 203 = 67%
Winning % on 1st serve	67 of 98 = 68%	90 of 137 = 66%
Winning % on 2nd serve	43 of 68 = 63%	30 of 66 = 45%
Aces	9	10
Double faults	2	4
Winners	57	44
Unforced errors	69	71
Winners-UFE	-12	-27
Receiving points won	83 of 203 = 41%	56 of 166 = 34%
Break point conversions	7 of 20 = 35%	4 of 6 = 67%
Net approaches	23 of 31 = 74%	16 of 19 = 84%
Total points won	193	176
Fastest serve	202 km/h	204 km/h
Average 1st serve speed	190 km/h	183 km/h
Average 2nd serve speed	150 km/h	136 km/h

_{Source}

== See also ==
- Djokovic–Nadal rivalry
- 2008 Wimbledon Championships – Men's singles final
- Longest tennis match records
