= 2015 China Open =

2015 China Open may refer to:

- 2015 China Open (snooker), a tournament that took place between April and March.
- 2015 China Open (tennis), a tournament that took place in October.
