= 2015 China Open – Women's singles =

Women's singles
- 2015 China Open

Final
- Champion: (Spain) Garbiñe Muguruza
- Runner-up: (Switzerland) Timea Bacsinszky
- Score: 7–5, 6–4

Details
- Seeds: 16

Events
Singles	men	women
Doubles	men	women
- China Open

Garbiñe Muguruza defeated Timea Bacsinszky in the final, 7–5, 6–4 to win the women's singles tennis title at the 2015 China Open. It was her first WTA Premier Mandatory level-tournament and second WTA Tour title overall, and she became the first Spanish player to win a Premier Mandatory tournament.

Maria Sharapova was the defending champion, but withdrew with a left forearm injury before the tournament began.

== Seeds ==
1. (Romania) Simona Halep (first round, retired)
2. (Czech Republic) Petra Kvitová (first round)
3. (Italy) Flavia Pennetta (third round)
4. (Poland) Agnieszka Radwańska (semifinals)
5. (Spain) Garbiñe Muguruza (champion)
6. (Serbia) Ana Ivanovic (semifinals)
7. (Spain) Carla Suárez Navarro (third round)
8. (Denmark) Caroline Wozniacki (third round)

9. (Czech Republic) Karolína Plíšková (first round)
10. (Germany) Angelique Kerber (quarterfinals)
11. (Switzerland) Belinda Bencic (second round, withdrew because of a right hand injury)
12. (Switzerland) Timea Bacsinszky (final)
13. (Germany) Andrea Petkovic (third round)
14. (United States) Madison Keys (third round, retired)
15. (Italy) Roberta Vinci (third round)
16. (Ukraine) Elina Svitolina (second round)

Click on the seed number of a player to go to their draw section.

The four Wuhan semifinalists received a bye into the second round. They were as follows:

- (Germany) Angelique Kerber
- (Spain) Garbiñe Muguruza
- (Italy) Roberta Vinci
- (United States) Venus Williams

== Draw ==
Key

- Q = Qualifier
- WC = Wild card
- LL = Lucky loser
- Alt = Alternate
- ITF = ITF entry
- PR = Protected ranking
- SR = Special ranking
- SE = Special exempt
- JE = Junior exempt
- JR = Junior Accelerator Programme entrant
- CO = College Accelerator Programme entrant
- NG = Next Gen Accelerator Program entrant
- w/o = Walkover
- r = Retired
- d = Defaulted

=== Finals ===
Quarterfinals
Q	(United States) Bethanie Mattek-Sands	1	5
5	(Spain) Garbiñe Muguruza	6	7
4	(Poland) Agnieszka Radwańska	6	6
10	(Germany) Angelique Kerber	1	4
6	(Serbia) Ana Ivanovic	6	7
(Russia) Anastasia Pavlyuchenkova	3	5
12	(Switzerland) Timea Bacsinszky	0	6	7
(Italy) Sara Errani	6	3	5

Semifinals
5	(Spain) Garbiñe Muguruza	4	6	6
4	(Poland) Agnieszka Radwańska	6	3	4
6	(Serbia) Ana Ivanovic	7	4	1
12	(Switzerland) Timea Bacsinszky	5	6	6

Final
5	(Spain) Garbiñe Muguruza	7	6
12	(Switzerland) Timea Bacsinszky	5	4

=== Top half ===
==== Section 1 ====
First round
1	(Romania) S Halep	4^{r}
Q	(Spain) L Arruabarrena	5
(France) A Cornet	3	3
Q	(United States) B Mattek-Sands	6	6
(Slovakia) AK Schmiedlová	2	4
(Belgium) A Van Uytvanck	6	6
11	(Switzerland) B Bencic	6^{4}	6	6
(United States) M Brengle	7^{7}	4	3
(Croatia) M Lučić-Baroni	6	3	6
(Romania) I-C Begu	1	6	3
(Russia) D Gavrilova	5	6	4
Q	(United States) I Falconi	7	2	6

Second round
Q	(Spain) L Arruabarrena	6	2	0
Q	(United States) B Mattek-Sands	0	6	6
(Belgium) A Van Uytvanck	2	2
15	(Italy) R Vinci	6	6
11	(Switzerland) B Bencic
(Croatia) M Lučić-Baroni	w/o
Q	(United States) I Falconi	2	1
5	(Spain) G Muguruza	6	6

Third round
Q	(United States) B Mattek-Sands	6	3	6
15	(Italy) R Vinci	1	6	2
(Croatia) M Lučić-Baroni	6	2	1
5	(Spain) G Muguruza	1	6	6

Quarterfinals
Q	(United States) B Mattek-Sands	1	5
5	(Spain) G Muguruza	6	7

==== Section 2 ====
First round
4	(Poland) A Radwańska	6	0
(United States) C Vandeweghe	3	0^{r}
(Germany) M Barthel	6	6
WC	(China) S Zhang	3	2
Q	(Ukraine) K Bondarenko	6	6
(Czech Republic) B Strýcová	3	2
(France) K Mladenovic	5	2
14	(United States) M Keys	7	6
PR	(Slovakia) D Cibulková	6	1	6
(Serbia) J Janković	1	6	3
WC	(China) Q Wang	6	3	6
(United States) V Lepchenko	2	6	2
Q	(Serbia) B Jovanovski	2	4
8	(Denmark) C Wozniacki	6	6

Second round
4	(Poland) A Radwańska	4	6	6
(Germany) M Barthel	6	1	4
Q	(Ukraine) K Bondarenko	6	1	0
14	(United States) M Keys	3	6	6
10	(Germany) A Kerber	6	6
PR	(Slovakia) D Cibulková	1	4
WC	(China) Q Wang	5	0
8	(Denmark) C Wozniacki	7	6

Third round
4	(Poland) A Radwańska	6	0
14	(United States) M Keys	3	0^{r}
10	(Germany) A Kerber	6	6
8	(Denmark) C Wozniacki	2	3

Quarterfinals
4	(Poland) A Radwańska	6	6
10	(Germany) A Kerber	1	4

=== Bottom half ===
==== Section 3 ====
First round
6	(Serbia) A Ivanovic	6	6
WC	(Australia) C Dellacqua	4	0
(Germany) C Witthöft	4	4
(Russia) S Kuznetsova	6	6
(United States) S Stephens	6	6
9	(Czech Republic) Ka Plíšková	3	2
16	(Ukraine) E Svitolina	7	6
Q	(Kazakhstan) Y Putintseva	5	2
(Germany) J Görges	2	4
(Russia) A Pavlyuchenkova	6	6
(Brazil) T Pereira	7	6
(Romania) A Dulgheru	5	2
WC	(China) X Han	5	6	4
3	(Italy) F Pennetta	7	4	6

Second round
6	(Serbia) A Ivanovic	7^{7}	6
(United States) V Williams	6^{3}	2
(Russia) S Kuznetsova	3	6	6
(United States) S Stephens	6	3	4
16	(Ukraine) E Svitolina	4	6	3
(Russia) A Pavlyuchenkova	6	1	6
(Brazil) T Pereira	6	0	4
3	(Italy) F Pennetta	3	6	6

Third round
6	(Serbia) A Ivanovic	7	4	6
(Russia) S Kuznetsova	5	6	2
(Russia) A Pavlyuchenkova	3	6	6
3	(Italy) F Pennetta	6	4	3

Quarterfinals
6	(Serbia) A Ivanovic	6	7
(Russia) A Pavlyuchenkova	3	5

==== Section 4 ====
First round
7	(Spain) C Suárez Navarro	6	0
(Ukraine) L Tsurenko	3	0^{r}
Q	(Puerto Rico) M Puig	6	0
(Kazakhstan) Z Diyas	4	0^{r}
(Bulgaria) T Pironkova	3	3
Q	(Colombia) M Duque Mariño	6	6
(Italy) C Giorgi	6	4	3
12	(Switzerland) T Bacsinszky	1	6	6
13	(Germany) A Petkovic	6	1
(Canada) E Bouchard	2	1^{r}
(Australia) S Stosur	6	6
(Romania) M Niculescu	3	2
WC	(China) S Zheng	2	2
(France) C Garcia	6	6
(Italy) S Errani	7	6
2	(Czech Republic) P Kvitová	5	4

Second round
7	(Spain) C Suárez Navarro	7^{7}	6
Q	(Puerto Rico) M Puig	6^{1}	2
Q	(Colombia) M Duque Mariño	5	2
12	(Switzerland) T Bacsinszky	7	6
13	(Germany) A Petkovic	6	7
(Australia) S Stosur	2	5
(France) C Garcia	4	6	1
(Italy) S Errani	6	3	6

Third round
7	(Spain) C Suárez Navarro	4	6	5
12	(Switzerland) T Bacsinszky	6	4	7
13	(Germany) A Petkovic	6	3	2
(Italy) S Errani	3	6	6

Quarterfinals
12	(Switzerland) T Bacsinszky	0	6	7
(Italy) S Errani	6	3	5

== Qualifying ==
=== Seeds ===
1. (Czech Republic) Lucie Hradecká (qualifying competition)
2. (Croatia) Ajla Tomljanović (qualifying competition)
3. (United States) Alison Riske (first round)
4. (United Kingdom) Heather Watson (qualifying competition)
5. (United States) Christina McHale (qualifying competition)
6. (Poland) Magda Linette (qualifying competition)
7. (Slovakia) Magdaléna Rybáriková (first round)
8. (United States) Irina Falconi (qualified)
9. (United States) Lauren Davis (qualifying competition)
10. (Hungary) Tímea Babos (first round)
11. (Montenegro) Danka Kovinić (first round)
12. (Colombia) Mariana Duque Mariño (qualified)
13. (Kazakhstan) Yulia Putintseva (qualified)
14. (Slovakia) Daniela Hantuchová (first round)
15. (Ukraine) Kateryna Bondarenko (qualified)
16. (United States) Bethanie Mattek-Sands (qualified)

=== Qualifiers ===
1. (United States) Bethanie Mattek-Sands
2. (Kazakhstan) Yulia Putintseva
3. (Puerto Rico) Monica Puig
4. (Ukraine) Kateryna Bondarenko
5. (Spain) Lara Arruabarrena
6. (Colombia) Mariana Duque Mariño
7. (Serbia) Bojana Jovanovski
8. (United States) Irina Falconi

=== Draw ===
==== First qualifier ====
First round
1	(Czech Republic) Lucie Hradecká	7^{7}	7^{7}
(Japan) Misaki Doi	6^{3}	6^{5}
(Romania) Patricia Maria Țig	3	6^{5}
16	(United States) Bethanie Mattek-Sands	6	7^{7}

Qualifying competition
1	(Czech Republic) Lucie Hradecká	6	2	6^{6}
16	(United States) Bethanie Mattek-Sands	3	6	7^{8}

==== Second qualifier ====
First round
2	(Croatia) Ajla Tomljanović	6	6
WC	(China) Liang Chen	4	2
WC	(China) Liu Fangzhou	7	0	1
13	(Kazakhstan) Yulia Putintseva	5	6	6

Qualifying competition
2	(Croatia) Ajla Tomljanović	2	4^{r}
13	(Kazakhstan) Yulia Putintseva	6	2

==== Third qualifier ====
First round
3	(United States) Alison Riske	4	1
(Puerto Rico) Monica Puig	6	6
(China) Wang Yafan	3	6	6
10	(Hungary) Tímea Babos	6	4	1

Qualifying competition
(Puerto Rico) Monica Puig	6	6
(China) Wang Yafan	3	4

==== Fourth qualifier ====
First round
4	(United Kingdom) Heather Watson	7	7^{7}
(Chinese Taipei) Hsieh Su-wei	5	6^{2}
WC	(China) Yang Zhaoxuan	6	2	2
15	(Ukraine) Kateryna Bondarenko	1	6	6

Qualifying competition
4	(United Kingdom) Heather Watson	3	4
15	(Ukraine) Kateryna Bondarenko	6	6

==== Fifth qualifier ====
First round
5	(United States) Christina McHale	6	4	7
(China) Duan Yingying	1	6	5
(Spain) Lara Arruabarrena	7^{7}	6
14	(Slovakia) Daniela Hantuchová	6^{2}	3

Qualifying competition
5	(United States) Christina McHale	4	7^{7}	6^{11}
(Spain) Lara Arruabarrena	6	6^{3}	7^{13}

==== Sixth qualifier ====
First round
6	(Poland) Magda Linette	6	6
(Australia) Jarmila Gajdošová	4	1
WC	(China) Xu Yifan	6^{5}	3
12	(Colombia) Mariana Duque Mariño	7^{7}	6

Qualifying competition
6	(Poland) Magda Linette	2	1
12	(Colombia) Mariana Duque Mariño	6	6

==== Seventh qualifier ====
First round
7	(Slovakia) Magdaléna Rybáriková	6	2	1
(Serbia) Bojana Jovanovski	1	6	6
(Russia) Elena Vesnina	6	4	3
9	(United States) Lauren Davis	3	6	6

Qualifying competition
(Serbia) Bojana Jovanovski	7^{8}	6
9	(United States) Lauren Davis	6^{6}	2

==== Eighth qualifier ====
First round
8	(United States) Irina Falconi	6	4	6
(Russia) Alla Kudryavtseva	2	6	2
(Kazakhstan) Yaroslava Shvedova	0	6	6
11	(Montenegro) Danka Kovinić	6	4	1

Qualifying competition
8	(United States) Irina Falconi	3	6	6
(Kazakhstan) Yaroslava Shvedova	6	2	2
