= 2015 China Open – Women's doubles =

Women's doubles
- 2015 China Open

Final
- Champions: (Switzerland) Martina Hingis (India) Sania Mirza
- Runners-up: (Chinese Taipei) Chan Hao-ching (Chinese Taipei) Chan Yung-jan
- Score: 6–7^{(9–11)}, 6–1, [10–8]

Events
Singles	men	women
Doubles	men	women
← 2014 ·	China Open	· 2016 →

Andrea Hlaváčková and Peng Shuai were the defending champions, but Peng could not participate due to injury. Hlaváčková played alongside Lucie Hradecká, but lost in the quarterfinals to Casey Dellacqua and Yaroslava Shvedova.
Martina Hingis and Sania Mirza won the title, defeating Chan Hao-ching and Chan Yung-jan in the final, 6–7^{(9–11)}, 6–1, [10–8].

== Seeds ==
The top four seeds received a bye into the second round.

1. (Switzerland) Martina Hingis / (India) Sania Mirza (champions)
2. (United States) Bethanie Mattek-Sands / (Russia) Elena Vesnina (quarterfinals)
3. (Australia) Casey Dellacqua / (Kazakhstan) Yaroslava Shvedova (semifinals)
4. (Hungary) Tímea Babos / (France) Kristina Mladenovic (quarterfinals)
5. (France) Caroline Garcia / (Slovenia) Katarina Srebotnik (second round)
6. (Chinese Taipei) Chan Hao-ching / (Chinese Taipei) Chan Yung-jan (final)
7. (United States) Raquel Kops-Jones / (United States) Abigail Spears (first round)
8. (Czech Republic) Andrea Hlaváčková / (Czech Republic) Lucie Hradecká (quarterfinals)

== Draw ==
=== Key ===
- Q = Qualifier
- WC = Wild card
- LL = Lucky loser
- Alt = Alternate
- SE = Special exempt
- PR = Protected ranking
- ITF = ITF entry
- JE = Junior exempt
- w/o = Walkover
- r = Retired
- d = Defaulted
- SR = Special ranking

=== Finals ===
Semifinals
1	(Switzerland) Martina Hingis (India) Sania Mirza	6	6
WC	(China) Liang Chen (China) Wang Yafan	2	3
3	(Australia) Casey Dellacqua (Kazakhstan) Yaroslava Shvedova	3	7^{7}	[10]
6	(Chinese Taipei) Chan Hao-ching (Chinese Taipei) Chan Yung-jan	6	6^{5}	[12]

Final
1	(Switzerland) Martina Hingis (India) Sania Mirza	6^{9}	6	[10]
6	(Chinese Taipei) Chan Hao-ching (Chinese Taipei) Chan Yung-jan	7^{11}	1	[8]

=== Top half ===
First round
(Italy) S Errani (Italy) F Pennetta	6	6
(Croatia) D Jurak (Australia) Ar Rodionova	1	3
(Slovakia) J Husárová (Romania) R Olaru	6^{4}	2
(Russia) A Kudryavtseva (Russia) A Pavlyuchenkova	7^{7}	6
(Germany) J Görges (Czech Republic) Ka Plíšková	7^{7}	3	[10]
7	(United States) R Kops-Jones (United States) A Spears	6^{5}	6	[6]
(Poland) K Jans-Ignacik (Australia) An Rodionova	6	1	[10]
Alt	(Ukraine) K Bondarenko (Ukraine) O Savchuk	2	6	[6]
(Switzerland) B Bencic (Czech Republic) B Strýcová	6	1	[9]
WC	(China) C Liang (China) Y Wang	4	6	[11]
(Chinese Taipei) C-j Chuang (Chinese Taipei) S-w Hsieh	2	7	[8]
5	(France) C Garcia (Slovenia) K Srebotnik	6	5	[10]

Second round
1	(Switzerland) M Hingis (India) S Mirza	1	6	[10]
(Italy) S Errani (Italy) F Pennetta	6	4	[6]
(Russia) A Kudryavtseva (Russia) A Pavlyuchenkova
(Germany) J Görges (Czech Republic) Ka Plíšková	w/o
4	(Hungary) T Babos (France) K Mladenovic	6	6
(Poland) K Jans-Ignacik (Australia) An Rodionova	2	1
WC	(China) C Liang (China) Y Wang	7^{7}	6
5	(France) C Garcia (Slovenia) K Srebotnik	6^{3}	3

Quarterfinals
1	(Switzerland) M Hingis (India) S Mirza	7^{7}	6
(Germany) J Görges (Czech Republic) Ka Plíšková	6^{5}	4
4	(Hungary) T Babos (France) K Mladenovic	6^{6}	5
WC	(China) C Liang (China) Y Wang	7^{8}	7

Semifinals
1	(Switzerland) M Hingis (India) S Mirza	6	6
WC	(China) C Liang (China) Y Wang	2	3

=== Bottom half ===
First round
8	(Czech Republic) A Hlaváčková (Czech Republic) L Hradecká	6	3	[11]
(Romania) I-C Begu (Romania) M Niculescu	2	6	[9]
WC	(Russia) S Kuznetsova (Australia) S Stosur	4	6	[8]
(Ukraine) L Kichenok (Ukraine) N Kichenok	6	2	[10]
(China) Y Xu (China) S Zheng	7^{7}	1	[6]
(Spain) L Arruabarrena (Slovenia) A Klepač	6^{4}	6	[10]
6	(Chinese Taipei) H-c Chan (Chinese Taipei) Y-j Chan	7^{7}	2	[10]
WC	(France) A Cornet (Poland) M Linette	6^{5}	6	[7]
(Germany) M Barthel (Germany) A-L Grönefeld	6	7
WC	(China) X Han (China) Z Yang	1	5
(Canada) G Dabrowski (Poland) A Rosolska	6	4	[10]
(Spain) A Medina Garrigues (Spain) A Parra Santonja	3	6	[8]

Second round
8	(Czech Republic) A Hlaváčková (Czech Republic) L Hradecká	6	6
(Ukraine) L Kichenok (Ukraine) N Kichenok	3	2
(Spain) L Arruabarrena (Slovenia) A Klepač	1	2
3	(Australia) C Dellacqua (Kazakhstan) Y Shvedova	6	6
6	(Chinese Taipei) H-c Chan (Chinese Taipei) Y-j Chan	w/o
(Germany) M Barthel (Germany) A-L Grönefeld
(Canada) G Dabrowski (Poland) A Rosolska	5	1
2	(United States) B Mattek-Sands (Russia) E Vesnina	7	6

Quarterfinals
8	(Czech Republic) A Hlaváčková (Czech Republic) L Hradecká	4	4
3	(Australia) C Dellacqua (Kazakhstan) Y Shvedova	6	6
6	(Chinese Taipei) H-c Chan (Chinese Taipei) Y-j Chan	4	7	[10]
2	(United States) B Mattek-Sands (Russia) E Vesnina	6	5	[7]

Semifinals
3	(Australia) C Dellacqua (Kazakhstan) Y Shvedova	3	7^{7}	[10]
6	(Chinese Taipei) H-c Chan (Chinese Taipei) Y-j Chan	6	6^{5}	[12]
