= Inside Tennis =

- Cover of Nov/Dec 2008 issue featuring Jelena Jankovic
- Categories: Sports magazine
- First issue: 1981
- Country: United States
- Language: English
- Website: www.insidetennis.com

Inside Tennis is a sports magazine that covers news from the world of tennis. It is published 10-times a year (monthly March through October and bi-monthly November through February) in Northern California, Southern California, Nevada, and Texas.

== History and profile ==
Inside Tennis has been in print since 1981 and has been available online since 2004. The magazine is based in Berkeley, California. Founded by William Simons, the magazine covers the WTA and ATP as well as local events. Managing Editor is Douglas Hochmuth, Production Manager is Martin Brown.

== See also ==
- Tennis (magazine)
- Tennis Week
