= 2015 China Open – Men's doubles =

Men's doubles
- 2015 China Open

Final
- Champions: (Canada) Vasek Pospisil (United States) Jack Sock
- Runners-up: (Canada) Daniel Nestor (France) Édouard Roger-Vasselin
- Score: 3–6, 6–3, [10–6]

Events
Singles	men	women
Doubles	men	women
← 2014 ·	China Open	· 2016 →

Jean-Julien Rojer and Horia Tecău are the defending champions, but lost to Vasek Pospisil and Jack Sock in the semifinals.

Pospisil and Sock went on to win the title, defeating Daniel Nestor and Édouard Roger-Vasselin in the final 3–6, 6–3, [10–6].

== Seeds ==
1. (Netherlands) Jean-Julien Rojer / (Romania) Horia Tecău (semifinals)
2. (Poland) Marcin Matkowski / (Serbia) Nenad Zimonjić (semifinals)
3. (Italy) Simone Bolelli / (Italy) Fabio Fognini (first round)
4. (Canada) Daniel Nestor / (France) Édouard Roger-Vasselin (final)

== Draw ==
=== Key ===
- Q = Qualifier
- WC = Wild card
- LL = Lucky loser
- Alt = Alternate
- SE = Special exempt
- PR = Protected ranking
- ITF = ITF entry
- JE = Junior exempt
- w/o = Walkover
- r = Retired
- d = Defaulted
- SR = Special ranking

=== Draw ===
First round
1	(Netherlands) J-J Rojer (Romania) H Tecău	3	6	[10]
(United States) E Butorac (United States) S Lipsky	6	3	[4]
(Uruguay) P Cuevas (Serbia) V Troicki	6	6
(India) R Bopanna (United States) J Isner	4	3
3	(Italy) S Bolelli (Italy) F Fognini	6^{5}	6	[9]
(Canada) V Pospisil (United States) J Sock	7^{7}	2	[11]
WC	(China) M Gong (New Zealand) M Venus	6^{5}	7^{8}	[5]
WC	(Serbia) D Djokovic (Serbia) N Djokovic	7^{7}	6^{6}	[10]
(Belgium) D Goffin (Austria) D Thiem	6	6
(Spain) D Marrero (Italy) A Seppi	2	4
(India) L Paes (Australia) J Peers	6^{1}	6	[9]
4	(Canada) D Nestor (France) É Roger-Vasselin	7^{7}	4	[11]
(Croatia) I Karlović (Poland) Ł Kubot	4	6^{3}
(United Kingdom) D Inglot (Sweden) R Lindstedt	6	7^{7}
Q	(Austria) J Knowle (Austria) O Marach	3	4
2	(Poland) M Matkowski (Serbia) N Zimonjić	6	6

Quarterfinals
1	(Netherlands) J-J Rojer (Romania) H Tecău	6	6
(Uruguay) P Cuevas (Serbia) V Troicki	4	2
(Canada) V Pospisil (United States) J Sock	6	6
WC	(Serbia) D Djokovic (Serbia) N Djokovic	4	1
(Belgium) D Goffin (Austria) D Thiem	3	4
4	(Canada) D Nestor (France) É Roger-Vasselin	6	6
(United Kingdom) D Inglot (Sweden) R Lindstedt	6	6^{4}	[7]
2	(Poland) M Matkowski (Serbia) N Zimonjić	4	7^{7}	[10]

Semifinals
1	(Netherlands) J-J Rojer (Romania) H Tecău	3	4
(Canada) V Pospisil (United States) J Sock	6	6
4	(Canada) D Nestor (France) É Roger-Vasselin	6	7^{12}
2	(Poland) M Matkowski (Serbia) N Zimonjić	4	6^{10}

Final
(Canada) V Pospisil (United States) J Sock	3	6	[10]
4	(Canada) D Nestor (France) É Roger-Vasselin	6	3	[6]

== Qualifying ==
=== Seeds ===
1. (Austria) Julian Knowle / (Austria) Oliver Marach (qualified)
2. (Russia) Teymuraz Gabashvili / (Czech Republic) Lukáš Rosol (first round)

=== Qualifiers ===
1. (Austria) Julian Knowle / (Austria) Oliver Marach

=== Qualifying draw ===
First round
1	(Austria) Julian Knowle (Austria) Oliver Marach	7	6
WC	(China) He Yecong (China) Qiu Zhuoyang	5	4
(Brazil) Thomaz Bellucci (Austria) Andreas Haider-Maurer	6	1	[10]
2	(Russia) Teymuraz Gabashvili (Czech Republic) Lukáš Rosol	4	6	[7]

Qualifying competition
1	(Austria) Julian Knowle (Austria) Oliver Marach	6	6
(Brazil) Thomaz Bellucci (Austria) Andreas Haider-Maurer	4	4
