= 2015 China Open (tennis) =

- Date: 5 October – 11 October
- Edition: 17th (ATP) / 19th (WTA)
- Category: ATP World Tour 500 (men); Premier Mandatory (women)
- Prize money: ATP $2,500,470; WTA $6,157,160
- Surface: Hard
- Location: Beijing, China
- Venue: National Tennis Center

Champions

Men's singles
- (Serbia) Novak Djokovic

Women's singles
- (Spain) Garbiñe Muguruza

Men's doubles
- (Canada) Vasek Pospisil / (United States) Jack Sock

Women's doubles
- (Switzerland) Martina Hingis / (India) Sania Mirza
- China Open (tennis)

The 2015 China Open was a tennis tournament played on outdoor hard courts. It was the 17th edition of the China Open for the men (19th for the women). It was part of ATP World Tour 500 series on the 2015 ATP World Tour, and the last WTA Premier Mandatory tournament of the 2015 WTA Tour. Both the men's and the women's events were held at the National Tennis Center in Beijing, China, from October 5 to October 11, 2015.

== Points and prize money ==
=== Point distribution ===
Event	W	F	SF	QF	Round of 16	Round of 32	Round of 64	Q	Q2	Q1
Men's singles	500	300	180	90	45	0	—N/a	20	10	0
Men's doubles	500	300	180	90	0	—N/a	—N/a	—N/a	—N/a	—N/a
Women's singles	1000	650	390	215	120	65	10	30	20	2
Women's doubles	1000	650	390	215	120	5	—N/a	—N/a	—N/a	—N/a

=== Prize money ===
Event	W	F	SF	QF	Round of 16	Round of 32	Round of 64	Q2	Q1
Men's singles	$654,725	$295,180	$139,820	$67,470	$34,400	$18,920	—N/a	$2,130	$1,175
Men's doubles	$193,420	$87,270	$41,150	$19,890	$10,210	—N/a	—N/a	—N/a	—N/a
Women's singles	$973,505	$487,161	$237,689	$114,182	$54,953	$26,603	$15,280	$4,071	$2,376
Women's doubles	$329,354	$165,268	$73,577	$33,959	$15,850	$7,360	—N/a	—N/a	—N/a

== ATP singles main-draw entrants ==
=== Seeds ===
Country	Player	Rank^{1}	Seed
SRB	Novak Djokovic	1	1
CZE	Tomáš Berdych	5	2
ESP	Rafael Nadal	7	3
ESP	David Ferrer	8	4
CAN	Milos Raonic	9	5
USA	John Isner	13	6
BEL	David Goffin	15	7
FRA	Jo-Wilfried Tsonga	16	8

- ^{1} Rankings are as of September 28, 2015

=== Other entrants ===
The following players received wildcards into the singles main draw:

- (Chinese Taipei) Lu Yen-hsun
- (China) Wu Di
- (China) Zhang Ze

The following players received entry from the qualifying draw:

- (United Kingdom) Aljaž Bedene
- (Italy) Simone Bolelli
- (Uzbekistan) Denis Istomin
- (Australia) John Millman

=== Withdrawals ===
Before the tournament

- (Germany) Philipp Kohlschreiber → replaced by (Austria) Andreas Haider-Maurer
- (Germany) Florian Mayer → replaced by (Canada) Vasek Pospisil
- (Argentina) Leonardo Mayer → replaced by (Dominican Republic) Víctor Estrella Burgos

== ATP doubles main-draw entrants ==
=== Seeds ===
Country	Player	Country	Player	Rank^{1}	Seed
NED	Jean-Julien Rojer	ROU	Horia Tecău	9	1
POL	Marcin Matkowski	SRB	Nenad Zimonjić	24	2
ITA	Simone Bolelli	ITA	Fabio Fognini	30	3
CAN	Daniel Nestor	FRA	Édouard Roger-Vasselin	35	4

- Rankings are as of September 28, 2015

=== Other entrants ===
The following pairs received wildcards into the doubles main draw:

- (Serbia) Djordje Djokovic / (Serbia) Novak Djokovic
- (China) Gong Maoxin / (New Zealand) Michael Venus

The following pair received entry from the qualifying draw:

- (Austria) Julian Knowle / (Austria) Oliver Marach

== WTA singles main-draw entrants ==
=== Seeds ===
Country	Player	Rank^{1}	Seed
ROU	Simona Halep	2	1
CZE	Petra Kvitová	4	2
ITA	Flavia Pennetta	6	3
POL	Agnieszka Radwańska	7	4
ESP	Garbiñe Muguruza	8	5
SRB	Ana Ivanovic	9	6
ESP	Carla Suárez Navarro	10	7
DEN	Caroline Wozniacki	11	8
CZE	Karolína Plíšková	12	9
GER	Angelique Kerber	13	10
SUI	Belinda Bencic	14	11
SUI	Timea Bacsinszky	15	12
GER	Andrea Petkovic	16	13
USA	Madison Keys	17	14
ITA	Roberta Vinci	18	15
UKR	Elina Svitolina	20	16

- ^{1} Rankings as of September 28, 2015.

=== Other entrants ===
The following players received wildcards into the singles main draw:

- (Australia) Casey Dellacqua
- (China) Han Xinyun
- (China) Wang Qiang
- (China) Zhang Shuai
- (China) Zheng Saisai

The following player received entry using a protected ranking into the singles main draw:

- (Slovakia) Dominika Cibulková

The following players received entry from the qualifying draw:

- (Spain) Lara Arruabarrena
- (Ukraine) Kateryna Bondarenko
- (Colombia) Mariana Duque Mariño
- (United States) Irina Falconi
- (Serbia) Bojana Jovanovski
- (United States) Bethanie Mattek-Sands
- (Puerto Rico) Monica Puig
- (Kazakhstan) Yulia Putintseva

=== Withdrawals ===
Before the tournament

- (Belarus) Victoria Azarenka (thigh injury)→replaced by (Belgium) Alison Van Uytvanck
- (Italy) Karin Knapp →replaced by (Croatia) Mirjana Lučić-Baroni
- (Germany) Sabine Lisicki (knee and leg injury)→replaced by (Germany) Carina Witthöft
- (Russia) Ekaterina Makarova (leg injury) →replaced by (Germany) Mona Barthel
- (China) Peng Shuai (back injury)→replaced by (Italy) Roberta Vinci
- (Czech Republic) Lucie Šafářová (abdominal injury and bacterial infection) →replaced by (Romania) Alexandra Dulgheru
- (Russia) Maria Sharapova (left forearm injury) →replaced by (Germany) Julia Görges
- (United States) Serena Williams (fatigue and injuries)→replaced by (Brazil) Teliana Pereira

During the tournament

- (Switzerland) Belinda Bencic (right hand injury)

=== Retirements ===
- (United States) Madison Keys (thigh injury)
- (Canada) Eugenie Bouchard (dizziness due to ongoing concussion)
- (Kazakhstan) Zarina Diyas (left lower calf injury)
- (Romania) Simona Halep (left ankle injury)
- (Ukraine) Lesia Tsurenko (right elbow injury)
- (United States) CoCo Vandeweghe (left ankle injury)

== WTA doubles main-draw entrants ==
=== Seeds ===
Country	Player	Country	Player	Rank^{1}	Seed
SUI	Martina Hingis	IND	Sania Mirza	3	1
USA	Bethanie Mattek-Sands	RUS	Elena Vesnina	9	2
AUS	Casey Dellacqua	KAZ	Yaroslava Shvedova	12	3
HUN	Tímea Babos	FRA	Kristina Mladenovic	19	4
FRA	Caroline Garcia	SLO	Katarina Srebotnik	25	5
TPE	Chan Hao-ching	TPE	Chan Yung-jan	28	6
USA	Raquel Kops-Jones	USA	Abigail Spears	31	7
CZE	Andrea Hlaváčková	CZE	Lucie Hradecká	37	8

- ^{1} Rankings are as of September 28, 2015

=== Other entrants ===
The following pairs received wildcards into the doubles main draw:

- (France) Alizé Cornet / (Poland) Magda Linette
- (China) Han Xinyun / (China) Yang Zhaoxuan
- (Russia) Svetlana Kuznetsova / (Australia) Samantha Stosur
- (China) Liang Chen / (China) Wang Yafan

The following pair received entry as alternates:

- (Ukraine) Kateryna Bondarenko / (Ukraine) Olga Savchuk

=== Withdrawals ===
Before the tournament

- (Spain) Garbiñe Muguruza (left ankle injury and gastrointestinal injury)

During the tournament

- (Russia) Alla Kudryavtseva (left hip injury)
- (Germany) Mona Barthel (right wrist injury)

== Champions ==
=== Men's singles ===
- (Serbia) Novak Djokovic def (Spain) Rafael Nadal 6–2, 6–2

=== Women's singles ===
- (Spain) Garbiñe Muguruza def (Switzerland) Tímea Bacsinszky 7–5, 6–4

=== Men's doubles ===
- (Canada) Vasek Pospisil / (United States) Jack Sock def (Canada) Daniel Nestor / (France) Édouard Roger-Vasselin 3–6, 6–3, [10–6]

=== Women's doubles ===
- (Switzerland) Martina Hingis / (India) Sania Mirza def (Chinese Taipei) Chan Hao-ching / (Chinese Taipei) Chan Yung-jan, 6–7^{(9–11)}, 6–1, [10–8]
