= 2015 China Open – Men's singles =

Men's singles
- 2015 China Open

Final
- Champion: (Serbia) Novak Djokovic
- Runner-up: (Spain) Rafael Nadal
- Score: 6–2, 6–2

Events
Singles	men	women
Doubles	men	women
← 2014 ·	China Open	· 2016 →

Three-time defending champion Novak Djokovic defeated Rafael Nadal in the final, 6–2, 6–2 to win the men's singles tennis title at the 2015 China Open. It was his sixth China Open title, and brought his record at the tournament to 29–0. He did not lose a single set in the entire tournament.

== Seeds ==
1. (Serbia) Novak Djokovic (champion)
2. (Czech Republic) Tomáš Berdych (first round)
3. (Spain) Rafael Nadal (final)
4. (Spain) David Ferrer (semifinals)
5. (Canada) Milos Raonic (first round)
6. (United States) John Isner (quarterfinals)
7. (Belgium) David Goffin (second round)
8. (France) Jo-Wilfried Tsonga (first round)

== Draw ==
=== Key ===
- Q = Qualifier
- WC = Wild card
- LL = Lucky loser
- Alt = Alternate
- SE = Special exempt
- PR = Protected ranking
- ITF = ITF entry
- JE = Junior exempt
- w/o = Walkover
- r = Retired
- d = Defaulted
- SR = Special ranking

=== Finals ===
Semifinals
1	(Serbia) Novak Djokovic	6	6
4	(Spain) David Ferrer	2	3
3	(Spain) Rafael Nadal	7	6
(Italy) Fabio Fognini	5	3

Final
1	(Serbia) Novak Djokovic	6	6
3	(Spain) Rafael Nadal	2	2

=== Top half ===
First round
1	(Serbia) N Djokovic	6	6
Q	(Italy) S Bolelli	1	1
Q	(Uzbekistan) D Istomin	3	6	3
WC	(China) Z Zhang	6	1	6
Q	(Australia) J Millman	4	6	6
(Spain) T Robredo	6	1	0
(Austria) D Thiem	5	1
6	(United States) J Isner	7	6
4	(Spain) D Ferrer	6	6
(Brazil) T Bellucci	4	3
Q	(United Kingdom) A Bedene	6	6^{6}	3
(Czech Republic) L Rosol	1	7^{8}	6
WC	(Chinese Taipei) Y-h Lu	6	6
(France) A Mannarino	3	2
(Serbia) V Troicki	6	6
5	(Canada) M Raonic	4	4

Second round
1	(Serbia) N Djokovic	6	6
WC	(China) Z Zhang	2	1
Q	(Australia) J Millman	6	6^{5}	4
6	(United States) J Isner	4	7^{7}	6
4	(Spain) D Ferrer	7^{7}	6
(Czech Republic) L Rosol	6^{5}	2
WC	(Chinese Taipei) Y-h Lu	6	7
(Serbia) V Troicki	4	5

Quarterfinals
1	(Serbia) N Djokovic	6	6
6	(United States) J Isner	2	2
4	(Spain) D Ferrer	6	6
WC	(Chinese Taipei) Y-h Lu	3	1

Semifinals
1	(Serbia) N Djokovic	6	6
4	(Spain) D Ferrer	2	3

=== Bottom half ===
First round
8	(France) J-W Tsonga	6^{4}	2
(Austria) A Haider-Maurer	7^{7}	6
(United States) J Sock	6	6
(Russia) T Gabashvili	4	3
(Canada) V Pospisil	4	7	6
(Dominican Republic) V Estrella Burgos	6	5	0
WC	(China) D Wu	4	4
3	(Spain) R Nadal	6	6
7	(Belgium) D Goffin	6	6
(Italy) A Seppi	2	3
(Italy) F Fognini	6	6
(Slovakia) M Kližan	2	1
(Spain) G García-López	5	6^{1}
(Croatia) I Karlović	7	7^{7}
(Uruguay) P Cuevas	6	6
2	(Czech Republic) T Berdych	4	4

Second round
(Austria) A Haider-Maurer	3	1
(United States) J Sock	6	6
(Canada) V Pospisil	6^{3}	4
3	(Spain) R Nadal	7^{7}	6
7	(Belgium) D Goffin	2	6	2
(Italy) F Fognini	6	2	6
(Croatia) I Karlović	6^{5}	6^{7}
(Uruguay) P Cuevas	7^{7}	7^{9}

Quarterfinals
(United States) J Sock	6	4	3
3	(Spain) R Nadal	3	6	6
(Italy) F Fognini	6	2	6
(Uruguay) P Cuevas	1	6	2

Semifinals
3	(Spain) R Nadal	7	6
(Italy) F Fognini	5	3

== Qualifying ==
=== Seeds ===
1. (United Kingdom) Aljaž Bedene (qualified)
2. (Uzbekistan) Denis Istomin (qualified)
3. (Italy) Simone Bolelli (qualified)
4. (France) Lucas Pouille (first round)
5. (Lithuania) Ričardas Berankis (first round)
6. (Australia) John Millman (qualified)
7. (Germany) Alexander Zverev (first round)
8. (Russia) Andrey Kuznetsov (qualifying competition)

=== Qualifiers ===
1. (United Kingdom) Aljaž Bedene
2. (Uzbekistan) Denis Istomin
3. (Italy) Simone Bolelli
4. (Australia) John Millman

=== Qualifying draw ===
==== First qualifier ====
First round
1	(United Kingdom) Aljaž Bedene	6	6
WC	(China) He Yecong	3	0
(Germany) Michael Berrer	6	6
7	(Germany) Alexander Zverev	4	4

Qualifying competition
1	(United Kingdom) Aljaž Bedene	6	6
(Germany) Michael Berrer	4	4

==== Second qualifier ====
First round
2	(Uzbekistan) Denis Istomin	6	6
(Australia) Luke Saville	4	2
WC	(China) Zhang Zhizhen	7	6
5	(Lithuania) Ričardas Berankis	5	3

Qualifying competition
2	(Uzbekistan) Denis Istomin	3	6	6
WC	(China) Zhang Zhizhen	6	3	2

==== Third qualifier ====
First round
3	(Italy) Simone Bolelli	6	6
WC	(Serbia) Djordje Djokovic	0	4
(Italy) Matteo Donati	4	2
8	(Russia) Andrey Kuznetsov	6	6

Qualifying competition
3	(Italy) Simone Bolelli	6	7^{7}
8	(Russia) Andrey Kuznetsov	2	6^{2}

==== Fourth qualifier ====
First round
4	(France) Lucas Pouille	2	4
(China) Bai Yan	6	6
(Australia) James Duckworth	4	4
6	(Australia) John Millman	6	6

Qualifying competition
(China) Bai Yan	1	1
6	(Australia) John Millman	6	6
