= Tennis Week =

American tennis magazine

- Editor-in-chief: Brandusa Niro
- Staff writers: Staff Online Editor: Richard Pagliaro; Editor at large: Richard Evans; Director of Photography: Rick Boeth Senior Editor: Valentine Uhovski
- Categories: Sports magazine (tennis)
- Frequency: Weekly (on-line)
- Circulation: 50,000 Monthly page views
- Founded: 1974
- Final issue: 2009
- Company: IMG
- Country: USA
- Based in: Rye, New York
- Language: English
- Website: TennisWeek

Tennis Week was an American sports magazine owned by media conglomerate IMG covering the world of tennis.

== History ==
Founded in 1974 by Eugene L. Scott, a former US Davis Cup player who was ranked within the world top 15. In December 2004, Tennis Week and the spirit of Eugene L. Scott traveled the American tennis ideals across the Atlantic, collaborating with a Greek tennis magazine called “Tennis Insider: the Greek edition of Tennis Week USA”. Tennis Insider was published by Direction SA and John Parthenios the person who arranged the whole project with Tennis Week USA from the very first beginning was the editor-in-chief and marketing director of the Greek attempt. The historical US magazine was acquired by IMG in December 2006, seven months after Scott's death.

They were partnered with the USPTA through 2008; to be offered as part of the USPTA membership subscription.

The print magazine was discontinued in March 2009 "to focus on its online web site".

IMG removed the website December 1, 2009.

== Staff ==
A number of famous tennis players have joined the staff over the years, such as Maria Sharapova.

== See also ==
- Tennis (magazine)
- Inside Tennis
