= Steve Flink =

American sports journalist and historian

Steve Flink (born June 26, 1952 in Santa Monica, California) is an American sports journalist and historian. Flink, who has been a columnist and editor with such magazines as World Tennis Magazine, Tennis Week and Tennis Channel and published two monographs on the history of tennis, in 2017 was elected to the International Tennis Hall of Fame in the Contributor category.

Flink was born in the New York City and became a fan of tennis in 1965, at age 12, when his father Stanley took him to the Wimbledon Championships. Later the same year Steve for the first time watched the US National Championships in New York. Flink himself recalls that as 15 years old he has already decided to become a tennis reporter. While still a boy, he also developed an interest in sports statistics.

In 1970, Flink moved to England where he began studying at the U.S. International University in Sussex. During his college years, he took part in student tennis competitions, showing remarkable consistence and "well rounded game" according to the team brochures. His father introduced him to future International Tennis Hall of Famers Bud Collins and John Barrett. In 1972 Collins, who was aware of Steve's flair for statistics and historical facts, hired the youth to help him at Wimbledon and the US Open. Steve was feeding Collins various facts and statistics during his reportages. The same year Flink first met Jack Kramer, who later became one of his mentors.

In 1973 Flink interviewed Chris Evert and sold the story to the World Tennis Magazine. After publishing another story in 1974 in the same magazine he was offered a permanent job by its owner Gladys Heldman. Flink's collaboration with World Tennis continued until 1991, and he took the positions of a columnist and an editor with this magazine. Since 1982 he has also covered the Wimbledon Championships and the French Open for CBS Radio (where he worked for more than 25 years), in 1970s and 1980s worked as a statistician for CBS, NBC and ABC telecasts and in 1980–1996 was a color commentator for ESPN and MSG. From 1992 to 2007 Flink was a senior correspondent for Tennis Week, and since 2007 he works as a columnist for the online magazine Tennis Channel.

As a tennis historian, Flink wrote two reputable monographs: The Greatest Tennis Matches of the 20th Century and The Greatest Tennis Matches of All-Time. In addition, for 12 years he was creating biographical portraits of players for John Barrett's annual book World of Tennis. Since 1994 he has been a consultant and writer for the International Tennis Hall of Fame, and later a member of this organization's Nominating Committee

Colleagues commend Steve Flink's journalistic work for its eloquence and commitment to facts, also noting his general charm as a person. In 2010, he was inducted into the Eastern Tennis Hall of Fame in New York, and in 2017 he was elected in a Contributor category to the International Tennis Hall of Fame together with Andy Roddick, Kim Clijsters, the late coach Vic Braden and the wheelchair tennis champion Monique Kalkman-Van Den Bosch.
