= Tennis (magazine) =

Sports magazine

- Cover of Jan/Feb 2015 issue featuring Eugenie Bouchard
- Senior editorial manager: Ed McGrogan
- Former editors: James Martin
- Categories: Sports magazine
- Frequency: Formerly 8 per year
- Publisher: Jeff Williams
- Total circulation: 601,090 (June 2012)
- First issue: May 1965
- Final issue: November/December 2022
- Company: Sinclair Broadcast Group
- Country: USA
- Based in: New York, NY
- Language: English
- Website: www.tennis.com

Tennis was a U.S. print sports magazine devoted to the sport of tennis. It was published eight months per year. It ceased print publication in 2022, but continues to operate a website for match scores and tournament information, Tennis.com.

== History ==
The magazine was established in May 1965, published out of Chicago with a regional focus. Asher Birnbaum of Skokie, IL was the founder, editor and publisher. The tennis boom of the 1970s resulted in a rapid expansion of the magazine, both in scope and circulation. In addition to top tennis stars, celebrities like Johnny Carson and Farrah Fawcett appeared on the cover. It was owned by Golf Digest / Tennis Magazine and sold to the New York Times Company.

Miller Publishing bought the magazine in 1997 from The New York Times Company. It brought on two retired champions as part owners and contributors: first Chris Evert in 2000, who served as publisher for a time, then Pete Sampras in 2003. In the early 2010s the circulation was 600,000 subscriptions, the majority of which were purchased by the United States Tennis Association (USTA) for its members.

In 2014, publisher and USTA board member Jeff Williams purchased controlling interest in Tennis Media Company, owner of the magazine and its offshoot website. In 2017, Sinclair Broadcast Group, owner of Tennis Channel, acquired Tennis Media Company for $8 million, seeking to build synergies between the properties.

In 2022, the magazine ceased its print run after 57 years. The November/December issue was its last print publication. It continued to publish news, analysis and feature articles on the website Tennis.com until 2026, when the website's editorial arm was shut down. Its final online feature article was published on 8 June, after which it pivoted to focus on reporting match scores and tournament information.

== Content ==
Aside from articles about the most recent events and most active players, the magazine also included the recent rankings for both ATP and WTA, as well as brief summaries of the future tournaments, their participants and the past winners.

Chris Evert had her own personal section in the magazine—usually the first page—which was called "Chrissie's Page". Besides Evert and Sampras, other famous players and coaches also contributed to the magazine: Paul Annacone was the Senior Instruction Editor and Brad Gilbert was the Touring Instruction Editor.

During the magazine's final print run in 2022, its senior writing and editing team included long-established contributors such as Peter Bodo, Joel Drucker and Steve Tignor. They all continued to write articles for Tennis.com until its editorial arm was axed.

== Legacy ==
When the magazine was founded, its contributors wanted to bring tennis to mainstream public recognition in the United States. Its inaugural edition recorded the complaint that "Tennis remains a step child of the sports pages; doomed to occasional agate-type recording of tournament scores." They provided coverage of both local tennis, such as junior tournaments in Milwaukee, and rising international stars.

Their vision of tennis becoming more popular was prescient. During the American tennis boom of the 1970s, the magazine soon became the vanguard of American tennis journalism. David Shaftel, the editor of Racquet Magazine, later recalled reading Tennis Magazine throughout the 1980s, and observed that tennis was "so much ... in the culture then".

The magazine's reach was evidenced by the interest of tennis stars such as Arthur Ashe in the 1970s, and the personal involvement of stars Evert and Sampras in the 2000s. As the publication aged, it continued to thrive on new reporting, as well preserving and republishing its early—now historical—interviews with tennis stars. Several of the sport's most prominent modern journalists, such as Bodo and Tignor, made their careers at the magazine.

In his eulogy of the magazine, Owen Lewis for Defector.com described Tennis as "the standard-bearing publication about the game for decades".

== "The 40 Greatest Players of the Tennis Era" (2005) ==
In celebration of its 40th anniversary (1965–2005), Tennis published a series rating the 40 best players of those four decades.

1. (United States) Pete Sampras
2. (Czechoslovakia) (United States) Martina Navratilova
3. (Germany) Steffi Graf
4. (United States) Chris Evert
5. (Sweden) Björn Borg
6. (Australia) Margaret Court
7. (United States) Jimmy Connors
8. (Australia) Rod Laver
9. (United States) Billie Jean King
10. (Czechoslovakia) (United States) Ivan Lendl
11. (United States) John McEnroe
12. (United States) Andre Agassi
13. (Socialist Federal Republic of Yugoslavia) (Federal Republic of Yugoslavia) (United States) Monica Seles
14. (Sweden) Stefan Edberg
15. (Sweden) Mats Wilander
16. (Australia) John Newcombe
17. (United States) Serena Williams
18. (Germany) Boris Becker
19. (Switzerland) Roger Federer
20. (Australia) Ken Rosewall
21. (Australia) Roy Emerson
22. (Switzerland) Martina Hingis
23. (Australia) Evonne Goolagong
24. (Argentina) Guillermo Vilas
25. (United States) Venus Williams
26. (United States) Jim Courier
27. (Spain) Arantxa Sánchez Vicario
28. (Romania) Ilie Năstase
29. (United States) Lindsay Davenport
30. (United States) Arthur Ashe
31. (Belgium) Justine Henin
32. (United States) Tracy Austin
33. (Czechoslovakia) (Australia) Hana Mandlíková
34. (Australia) Lleyton Hewitt
35. (United States) Stan Smith
36. (United States) Jennifer Capriati
37. (Brazil) Gustavo Kuerten
38. (United Kingdom) Virginia Wade
39. (Australia) Patrick Rafter
40. (Argentina) Gabriela Sabatini

== "The 50 Greatest Players of the Open Era" (2018) ==
In celebration of the 50th anniversary of the Open Era in tennis (1968–2018), the magazine published a series rating the 50 best players of those five decades (25 men and 25 women).

- Active players are marked in **boldface**.

**Men**

1. (Switzerland) Roger Federer
2. (Australia) Rod Laver
3. (Spain) Rafael Nadal
4. (United States) Pete Sampras
5. (Serbia) **Novak Djokovic**
6. (Sweden) Björn Borg
7. (Australia) Ken Rosewall
8. (Czechoslovakia) (United States) Ivan Lendl
9. (United States) John McEnroe
10. (United States) Jimmy Connors
11. (United States) Andre Agassi
12. (Sweden) Mats Wilander
13. (Germany) Boris Becker
14. (Sweden) Stefan Edberg
15. (Australia) John Newcombe
16. (Argentina) Guillermo Vilas
17. (United States) Jim Courier
18. (United Kingdom) Andy Murray
19. (Romania) Ilie Năstase
20. (United States) Arthur Ashe
21. (Brazil) Gustavo Kuerten
22. (Australia) Lleyton Hewitt
23. (United States) Stan Smith
24. (Switzerland) **Stan Wawrinka**
25. (United States) Andy Roddick

**Women**

1. (United States) Serena Williams
2. (Germany) Steffi Graf
3. (Czechoslovakia) (United States) Martina Navratilova
4. (Australia) Margaret Court
5. (United States) Chris Evert
6. (United States) Billie Jean King
7. (Socialist Federal Republic of Yugoslavia) (Federal Republic of Yugoslavia) (United States) Monica Seles
8. (United States) **Venus Williams**
9. (Belgium) Justine Henin
10. (Australia) Evonne Goolagong
11. (Switzerland) Martina Hingis
12. (Russia) Maria Sharapova
13. (Spain) Arantxa Sánchez Vicario
14. (Belgium) Kim Clijsters
15. (United States) Lindsay Davenport
16. (United Kingdom) Virginia Wade
17. (United States) Jennifer Capriati
18. (United States) Tracy Austin
19. (Czechoslovakia) (Australia) Hana Mandlíková
20. (Argentina) Gabriela Sabatini
21. (France) Amélie Mauresmo
22. (Belarus) **Victoria Azarenka**
23. (Germany) **Angelique Kerber**
24. (Denmark) **Caroline Wozniacki**
25. (China) Na Li

== See also ==
- Inside Tennis
- Tennis Week
