= Russell Fuller =

British sports broadcaster

Russell Fuller is a British sports broadcaster. He was one of the three main presenters of Sportsworld which can be heard Saturday and Sunday on BBC World Service, and a regular presenter on BBC Radio 5 Live. The average weekly audience as of June 2009 was 188 million. He became the BBC's Tennis Correspondent in 2013.

== Education ==
Fuller was educated at the Royal Grammar School, Guildford, an independent school in the town of Guildford in Surrey, followed by the University of Exeter and Cardiff University.

== Life and career ==
Fuller was part of the team which won the bronze award in the best sports programme category at the 2009 Sony Radio Academy awards and was interviewer for BBC TV's coverage of the 2011 Open Championship golf.

Following the 2013 Wimbledon Championships, Fuller became the BBC's Tennis Correspondent, succeeding Jonathan Overend.
