= 2015 Novak Djokovic tennis season =

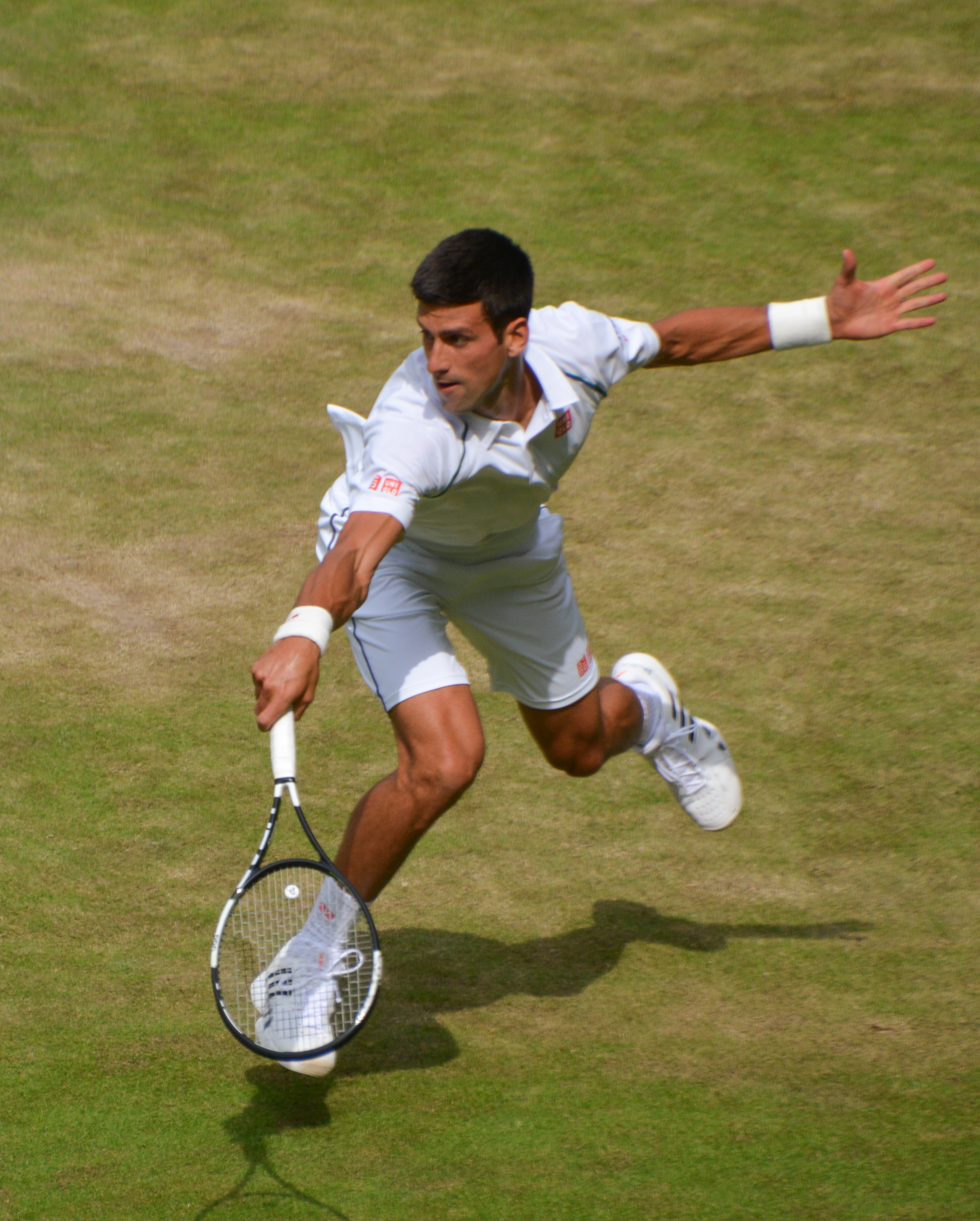
- Djokovic at the 2015 Wimbledon
- Full name: Novak Djokovic
- Country: Serbia
- Calendar prize money: $21,646,145 (singles & doubles)

Singles
- Season record: 82–6
- Calendar titles: 11
- Year-end ranking: No. 1
- Ranking change from previous year: Steady

Grand Slam & significant results
- Australian Open: W
- French Open: F
- Wimbledon: W
- US Open: W
- Other tournaments
- Tour Finals: W

Doubles
- Season record: 7–5
- Calendar titles: 0
- Year-end ranking: No. 125
- Ranking change from previous year: ▲448

Davis Cup
- Davis Cup: QF

Injuries
- Injuries: fever (following Mubadala Open)

The 2015 Novak Djokovic tennis season is considered one of the greatest seasons of all time by an individual tennis player. Selected achievements/records from this season are: winning 3 Major titles, becoming only the third man to reach all four major finals in an Open Era season (after Rod Laver and Roger Federer), reigning as world number 1 for all 52 weeks of the year, winning a record 6 Masters 1000 tournaments, claiming the ATP World Tour Finals, reaching the final of 8 Masters 1000 tournaments, reaching a record 15 consecutive finals, a record 31 victories against players ranked in the top 10 at the time of the match and earning a record breaking amount of prize money. Djokovic had an impressive 15–4 record against the other 3 members of men's tennis's Big Four, including a 4–0 record versus Rafael Nadal, 5–3 against Roger Federer and 6–1 record against Andy Murray. Beyond that, he also finished the season with a 16–4 record against Top-5 players.

== Analysis ==
It is considered by some to be the greatest season in Open Era tennis history, as he was dominant at all Big Title events and statistically the season was unprecedented. It is often compared to Federer's 2006 season. It is considered one of Djokovic's two absolute best seasons, alongside his 2011 season.

== Year summary ==
=== Grand Slams ===
Djokovic reached the final of the 2015 Australian Open after beating Milos Raonic in the quarterfinals and defending champion Stan Wawrinka in the semifinals. He then defeated Andy Murray in the final, earning him a fifth Australian Open title, an Open Era record.

At the French Open, Djokovic reached the final by defeating arch-rival Rafael Nadal in the quarterfinals (becoming only the second man to beat Nadal at Roland Garros) and Andy Murray in the semifinals, but was defeated in the final by Stan Wawrinka to end a 28-match win streak and prevent Djokovic from completing the career Grand Slam.

At the 2015 Wimbledon Championships, he started his title defense by beating Philipp Kohlschreiber, Jarkko Nieminen, and Bernard Tomic in the first three rounds. In the fourth round, Djokovic dropped the first two sets before coming back to beat Kevin Anderson in five. He then went on to beat Marin Čilić and Richard Gasquet in straight sets to meet Roger Federer in the final, a repeat of last year's final. Djokovic would again prevail in 4 sets, giving him his 9th major and second major of the year, the first time he won multiple majors in a calendar year since 2011.

At the US Open, Djokovic reached the final by beating Feliciano López in the quarterfinals and soundly beating Marin Čilić in the semifinals, losing only three games in the entire match. In the final he trumped Roger Federer in a four setter to win the title. Djokovic knocked out the defending champion of every major other than Wimbledon, where he was reigning champion and knocked out 2014's runner up.

2015 was the first time in Djokovic's career that he reached the final of all four grand slams and winning 3 out of 4, with the only loss coming at the French Open to Stan Wawrinka. He repeated the feat in 2021 and in 2023, reaching all 4 finals and winning 3, the only loss was at the US Open to Daniil Medvedev in 2021, and Wimbledon where he was beaten by Carlos Alcaraz in 2023.

=== Other tournaments ===
Djokovic began the year with a warm-up tournament at the World Tennis Championship, but later withdrew from his final against Andy Murray. He then began his season in Doha, Qatar. Djokovic's next tournament was the 2015 Dubai Tennis Championships in late February where he reached the semifinals in 2014 losing to Roger Federer. Djokovic however lost to Federer 3–6, 5–7. He met Federer again in the final of the 2015 BNP Paribas Open at Indian Wells and won in three sets. Djokovic then competed in the 2015 Miami Open and won the tournament for the fifth time after defeating Andy Murray in the final in three sets.

In the clay season, Djokovic competed in the 2015 Monte-Carlo Rolex Masters and won the tournament for the second time after defeating Marin Čilić in the quarterfinals, Rafael Nadal in the semi-finals, and Tomáš Berdych in the final, thus extending his winning streak to 17 matches. He also won his 23rd Masters title, tying Roger Federer. Djokovic withdrew from the Madrid Open to rest for the Italian Open and the French Open. After withdrawing from Madrid, Djokovic won his fourth Rome title at the 2015 Internazionali BNL d'Italia by defeating Roger Federer in the final in straight sets, thus extending his winning streak to 22 matches.

In the summer hard court season, Djokovic competed in both the 2015 Rogers Cup and the 2015 Western & Southern Open where he reached the final in both tournaments. In the former, Djokovic lost to Andy Murray in three sets, ending his 8 match winning streak against Murray, while in the latter, Djokovic lost to Roger Federer in two sets, ending his 3 match winning streak against Federer, as well as ending his quest for a complete set of Masters 1000 titles. After the US Open, during the fall Asian swing, Djokovic won his sixth China Open title and his third Shanghai Masters title, winning all his matches in straight sets. After winning in Shanghai, Djokovic won his sixth masters title of the year at the 2015 BNP Paribas Masters defeating Andy Murray in the final for his sixth win of the season against Murray.

Djokovic became the only player to beat each player from the top 10 in the 2015 tennis season.

== All matches ==
This table lists all the matches of Djokovic this year, including walkovers W/O (they are marked ND for non-decision)

Key
W	F	SF	QF	#R	RR	Q#	P#	DNQ	A	Z#	PO	G	S	B	NMS	NTI	P	NH

(W) winner; (F) finalist; (SF) semifinalist; (QF) quarterfinalist; (#R) rounds 4, 3, 2, 1; (RR) round-robin stage; (Q#) qualification round; (P#) preliminary round; (DNQ) did not qualify; (A) absent; (Z#) Davis/Fed Cup Zonal Group (with number indication) or (PO) play-off; (G) gold, (S) silver or (B) bronze Olympic/Paralympic medal; (NMS) not a Masters tournament; (NTI) not a Tier I tournament; (P) postponed; (NH) not held; (SR) strike rate (events won / competed); (W–L) win–loss record.
To avoid confusion and double counting, these charts are updated at the conclusion of a tournament or when the player's participation has ended.

=== Singles matches ===
Tournament	Match	Round	Opponent (seed or key)	Rank	Result	Score
Qatar Open; Doha, Qatar; ATP 250; Hard, outdoor 5 – 10 January 2015
Qatar Open; Doha, Qatar; ATP 250; Hard, outdoor 5 – 10 January 2015	1 / 745	1R	(Serbia) Dušan Lajović	68	Win	6–2, 6–1
Qatar Open; Doha, Qatar; ATP 250; Hard, outdoor 5 – 10 January 2015	2 / 746	2R	(Ukraine) Sergiy Stakhovsky	57	Win	6–2, 6–1
Qatar Open; Doha, Qatar; ATP 250; Hard, outdoor 5 – 10 January 2015	3 / 747	QF	(Croatia) Ivo Karlović (7)	27	Loss	7–6^{(7–2)}, 6–7^{(7–9)}, 4–6
Australian Open; Melbourne, Australia; Grand Slam tournament Hard, outdoor 19 January – 1 February 2015
Australian Open; Melbourne, Australia; Grand Slam tournament Hard, outdoor 19 January – 1 February 2015	4 / 748	1R	(United Kingdom) Aljaž Bedene (Q)	116	Win	6–3, 6–2, 6–4
Australian Open; Melbourne, Australia; Grand Slam tournament Hard, outdoor 19 January – 1 February 2015	5 / 749	2R	(Russia) Andrey Kuznetsov	88	Win	6–0, 6–1, 6–4
Australian Open; Melbourne, Australia; Grand Slam tournament Hard, outdoor 19 January – 1 February 2015	6 / 750	3R	(Spain) Fernando Verdasco (31)	33	Win	7–6^{(10–8)}, 6–3, 6–4
Australian Open; Melbourne, Australia; Grand Slam tournament Hard, outdoor 19 January – 1 February 2015	7 / 751	4R	(Luxembourg) Gilles Müller	42	Win	6–4, 7–5, 7–5
Australian Open; Melbourne, Australia; Grand Slam tournament Hard, outdoor 19 January – 1 February 2015	8 / 752	QF	(Canada) Milos Raonic (8)	8	Win	7–6^{(7–5)}, 6–4, 6–2
Australian Open; Melbourne, Australia; Grand Slam tournament Hard, outdoor 19 January – 1 February 2015	9 / 753	SF	(Switzerland) Stan Wawrinka (4)	4	Win	7–6^{(7–1)}, 3–6, 6–4, 4–6, 6–0
Australian Open; Melbourne, Australia; Grand Slam tournament Hard, outdoor 19 January – 1 February 2015	10 / 754	W	(United Kingdom) Andy Murray (6)	6	Win (1)	7–6^{(7–5)}, 6–7^{(4–7)}, 6–3, 6–0
Dubai Open; Dubai, United Arab Emirates; ATP 500; Hard, outdoor 23 – 28 February 2015
Dubai Open; Dubai, United Arab Emirates; ATP 500; Hard, outdoor 23 – 28 February 2015	11 / 755	1R	(Canada) Vasek Pospisil	60	Win	6–4, 6–4
Dubai Open; Dubai, United Arab Emirates; ATP 500; Hard, outdoor 23 – 28 February 2015	12 / 756	2R	(Russia) Andrey Golubev	107	Win	6–1, 6–2
Dubai Open; Dubai, United Arab Emirates; ATP 500; Hard, outdoor 23 – 28 February 2015	13 / 757	QF	(Turkey) Marsel İlhan (Q)	104	Win	6–1, 6–1
Dubai Open; Dubai, United Arab Emirates; ATP 500; Hard, outdoor 23 – 28 February 2015	14 / 758	SF	(Czech Republic) Tomáš Berdych (4)	8	Win	6–0, 5–7, 6–4
Dubai Open; Dubai, United Arab Emirates; ATP 500; Hard, outdoor 23 – 28 February 2015	15 / 759	F	(Switzerland) Roger Federer (2)	2	Loss (1)	3–6, 5–7
Davis Cup; Kraljevo, Serbia; Davis Cup; Hard, indoor 6 – 8 March 2015
Davis Cup; Kraljevo, Serbia; Davis Cup; Hard, indoor 6 – 8 March 2015	16 / 760	1R; R1	(Croatia) Mate Delić	158	Win	6–3, 6–2, 6–4
Indian Wells Masters; Indian Wells, United States; ATP 1000; Hard, outdoor 9 – 22 March 2015
Indian Wells Masters; Indian Wells, United States; ATP 1000; Hard, outdoor 9 – 22 March 2015	–	1R	Bye			
Indian Wells Masters; Indian Wells, United States; ATP 1000; Hard, outdoor 9 – 22 March 2015	17 / 761	2R	(Cyprus) Marcos Baghdatis	61	Win	6–1, 6–3
Indian Wells Masters; Indian Wells, United States; ATP 1000; Hard, outdoor 9 – 22 March 2015	18 / 762	3R	(Spain) Albert Ramos	68	Win	7–5, 6–3
Indian Wells Masters; Indian Wells, United States; ATP 1000; Hard, outdoor 9 – 22 March 2015	19 / 763	4R	(United States) John Isner (18)	20	Win	6–4, 7–6^{(7–5)}
Indian Wells Masters; Indian Wells, United States; ATP 1000; Hard, outdoor 9 – 22 March 2015	–	QF	(Australia) Bernard Tomic (32)	35	W/O	N/A
Indian Wells Masters; Indian Wells, United States; ATP 1000; Hard, outdoor 9 – 22 March 2015	20 / 764	SF	(United Kingdom) Andy Murray (4)	4	Win	6–2, 6–3
Indian Wells Masters; Indian Wells, United States; ATP 1000; Hard, outdoor 9 – 22 March 2015	21 / 765	W	(Switzerland) Roger Federer (2)	2	Win (2)	6–3, 6–7^{(5–7)}, 6–2
Miami Open; Miami, United States; ATP 1000; Hard, outdoor 23 March – 5 April 2015
Miami Open; Miami, United States; ATP 1000; Hard, outdoor 23 March – 5 April 2015	–	1R	Bye			
Miami Open; Miami, United States; ATP 1000; Hard, outdoor 23 March – 5 April 2015	22 / 766	2R	(Slovakia) Martin Kližan	41	Win	6–0, 5–7, 6–1
Miami Open; Miami, United States; ATP 1000; Hard, outdoor 23 March – 5 April 2015	23 / 767	3R	(Belgium) Steve Darcis (Q)	84	Win	6–0, 7–5
Miami Open; Miami, United States; ATP 1000; Hard, outdoor 23 March – 5 April 2015	24 / 768	4R	(Ukraine) Alexandr Dolgopolov	65	Win	6–7^{(3–7)}, 7–5, 6–0
Miami Open; Miami, United States; ATP 1000; Hard, outdoor 23 March – 5 April 2015	25 / 769	QF	(Spain) David Ferrer (6)	7	Win	7–5, 7–5
Miami Open; Miami, United States; ATP 1000; Hard, outdoor 23 March – 5 April 2015	26 / 770	SF	(United States) John Isner (22)	24	Win	7–6^{(7–3)}, 6–2
Miami Open; Miami, United States; ATP 1000; Hard, outdoor 23 March – 5 April 2015	27 / 771	W	(United Kingdom) Andy Murray (3)	4	Win (3)	7–6^{(7–3)}, 4–6, 6–0
Monte-Carlo Masters; Monte-Carlo, Monaco; ATP 1000; Clay, outdoor 13 – 19 April 2015
Monte-Carlo Masters; Monte-Carlo, Monaco; ATP 1000; Clay, outdoor 13 – 19 April 2015	–	1R	Bye			
Monte-Carlo Masters; Monte-Carlo, Monaco; ATP 1000; Clay, outdoor 13 – 19 April 2015	28 / 772	2R	(Spain) Albert Ramos	67	Win	6–1, 6–4
Monte-Carlo Masters; Monte-Carlo, Monaco; ATP 1000; Clay, outdoor 13 – 19 April 2015	29 / 773	3R	(Austria) Andreas Haider-Maurer	52	Win	6–4, 6–0
Monte-Carlo Masters; Monte-Carlo, Monaco; ATP 1000; Clay, outdoor 13 – 19 April 2015	30 / 774	QF	(Croatia) Marin Čilić (8)	10	Win	6–0, 6–3
Monte-Carlo Masters; Monte-Carlo, Monaco; ATP 1000; Clay, outdoor 13 – 19 April 2015	31 / 775	SF	(Spain) Rafael Nadal (3)	5	Win	6–3, 6–3
Monte-Carlo Masters; Monte-Carlo, Monaco; ATP 1000; Clay, outdoor 13 – 19 April 2015	32 / 776	W	(Czech Republic) Tomáš Berdych (6)	8	Win (4)	7–5, 4–6, 6–3
Italian Open; Rome, Italy; ATP 1000; Clay, outdoor 11 – 17 May 2015
Italian Open; Rome, Italy; ATP 1000; Clay, outdoor 11 – 17 May 2015	–	1R	Bye			
Italian Open; Rome, Italy; ATP 1000; Clay, outdoor 11 – 17 May 2015	33 / 777	2R	(Spain) Nicolás Almagro (PR)	174	Win	6–1, 6–7^{(5–7)}, 6–3
Italian Open; Rome, Italy; ATP 1000; Clay, outdoor 11 – 17 May 2015	34 / 778	3R	(Brazil) Thomaz Bellucci (Q)	68	Win	5–7, 6–2, 6–3
Italian Open; Rome, Italy; ATP 1000; Clay, outdoor 11 – 17 May 2015	35 / 779	QF	(Japan) Kei Nishikori (5)	6	Win	6–3, 3–6, 6–1
Italian Open; Rome, Italy; ATP 1000; Clay, outdoor 11 – 17 May 2015	36 / 780	SF	(Spain) David Ferrer (7)	8	Win	6–4, 6–4
Italian Open; Rome, Italy; ATP 1000; Clay, outdoor 11 – 17 May 2015	37 / 781	W	(Switzerland) Roger Federer (2)	2	Win (5)	6–4, 6–3
French Open; Paris, France; Grand Slam tournament Clay, outdoor 25 May – 7 June 2015
French Open; Paris, France; Grand Slam tournament Clay, outdoor 25 May – 7 June 2015	38 / 782	1R	(Finland) Jarkko Nieminen	86	Win	6–2, 7–5, 6–2
French Open; Paris, France; Grand Slam tournament Clay, outdoor 25 May – 7 June 2015	39 / 783	2R	(Luxembourg) Gilles Müller	55	Win	6–1, 6–4, 6–4
French Open; Paris, France; Grand Slam tournament Clay, outdoor 25 May – 7 June 2015	40 / 784	3R	(Australia) Thanasi Kokkinakis (WC)	84	Win	6–4, 6–4, 6–4
French Open; Paris, France; Grand Slam tournament Clay, outdoor 25 May – 7 June 2015	41 / 785	4R	(France) Richard Gasquet (20)	21	Win	6–1, 6–2, 6–3
French Open; Paris, France; Grand Slam tournament Clay, outdoor 25 May – 7 June 2015	42 / 786	QF	(Spain) Rafael Nadal (6)	7	Win	7–5, 6–3, 6–1
French Open; Paris, France; Grand Slam tournament Clay, outdoor 25 May – 7 June 2015	43 / 787	SF	(United Kingdom) Andy Murray (3)	3	Win	6–3, 6–3, 5–7, 5–7, 6–1
French Open; Paris, France; Grand Slam tournament Clay, outdoor 25 May – 7 June 2015	44 / 788	F	(Switzerland) Stan Wawrinka (8)	8	Loss (2)	6–4, 4–6, 3–6, 4–6
Wimbledon; London, United Kingdom; Grand Slam tournament Grass, outdoor 29 June – 12 July 2015
Wimbledon; London, United Kingdom; Grand Slam tournament Grass, outdoor 29 June – 12 July 2015	45 / 789	1R	(Germany) Philipp Kohlschreiber	33	Win	6–4, 6–4, 6–4
Wimbledon; London, United Kingdom; Grand Slam tournament Grass, outdoor 29 June – 12 July 2015	46 / 790	2R	(Finland) Jarkko Nieminen	92	Win	6–4, 6–2, 6–3
Wimbledon; London, United Kingdom; Grand Slam tournament Grass, outdoor 29 June – 12 July 2015	47 / 791	3R	(Australia) Bernard Tomic (27)	26	Win	6–3, 6–3, 6–3
Wimbledon; London, United Kingdom; Grand Slam tournament Grass, outdoor 29 June – 12 July 2015	48 / 792	4R	(South Africa) Kevin Anderson (14)	14	Win	6–7^{(6–8)}, 6–7^{(6–8)}, 6–1, 6–4, 7–5
Wimbledon; London, United Kingdom; Grand Slam tournament Grass, outdoor 29 June – 12 July 2015	49 / 793	QF	(Croatia) Marin Čilić (9)	9	Win	6–4, 6–4, 6–4
Wimbledon; London, United Kingdom; Grand Slam tournament Grass, outdoor 29 June – 12 July 2015	50 / 794	SF	(France) Richard Gasquet (21)	20	Win	7–6^{(7–2)}, 6–4, 6–4
Wimbledon; London, United Kingdom; Grand Slam tournament Grass, outdoor 29 June – 12 July 2015	51 / 795	W	(Switzerland) Roger Federer (2)	2	Win (6)	7–6^{(7–1)}, 6–7^{(10–12)}, 6–4, 6–3
Canadian Open; Montreal, Canada; ATP 1000; Hard, outdoor 10 – 16 August 2015
Canadian Open; Montreal, Canada; ATP 1000; Hard, outdoor 10 – 16 August 2015	–	1R	Bye			
Canadian Open; Montreal, Canada; ATP 1000; Hard, outdoor 10 – 16 August 2015	52 / 796	2R	(Brazil) Thomaz Bellucci	33	Win	6–3, 7–6^{(7–4)}
Canadian Open; Montreal, Canada; ATP 1000; Hard, outdoor 10 – 16 August 2015	53 / 797	3R	(United States) Jack Sock	35	Win	6–2, 6–1
Canadian Open; Montreal, Canada; ATP 1000; Hard, outdoor 10 – 16 August 2015	54 / 798	QF	(Latvia) Ernests Gulbis (Q)	87	Win	5–7, 7–6^{(9–7)}, 6–1
Canadian Open; Montreal, Canada; ATP 1000; Hard, outdoor 10 – 16 August 2015	55 / 799	SF	(France) Jérémy Chardy	49	Win	6–4, 6–4
Canadian Open; Montreal, Canada; ATP 1000; Hard, outdoor 10 – 16 August 2015	56 / 800	F	(United Kingdom) Andy Murray (2)	3	Loss (3)	4–6, 6–4, 3–6
Cincinnati Masters; Cincinnati, United States; ATP 1000; Hard, outdoor 17 – 23 August 2015
Cincinnati Masters; Cincinnati, United States; ATP 1000; Hard, outdoor 17 – 23 August 2015	–	1R	Bye			
Cincinnati Masters; Cincinnati, United States; ATP 1000; Hard, outdoor 17 – 23 August 2015	57 / 801	2R	(France) Benoît Paire (LL)	42	Win	7–5, 6–2
Cincinnati Masters; Cincinnati, United States; ATP 1000; Hard, outdoor 17 – 23 August 2015	58 / 802	3R	(Belgium) David Goffin (13)	14	Win	6–4, 2–6, 6–3
Cincinnati Masters; Cincinnati, United States; ATP 1000; Hard, outdoor 17 – 23 August 2015	59 / 803	QF	(Switzerland) Stan Wawrinka (5)	5	Win	6–4, 6–1
Cincinnati Masters; Cincinnati, United States; ATP 1000; Hard, outdoor 17 – 23 August 2015	60 / 804	SF	(Ukraine) Alexandr Dolgopolov (Q)	66	Win	4–6, 7–6^{(7–5)}, 6–2
Cincinnati Masters; Cincinnati, United States; ATP 1000; Hard, outdoor 17 – 23 August 2015	61 / 805	F	(Switzerland) Roger Federer (2)	3	Loss (4)	6–7^{(1–7)}, 3–6
US Open; New York City, United States; Grand Slam tournament Hard, outdoor 31 August – 13 September 2015
US Open; New York City, United States; Grand Slam tournament Hard, outdoor 31 August – 13 September 2015	62 / 806	1R	(Brazil) João Souza	89	Win	6–1, 6–1, 6–1
US Open; New York City, United States; Grand Slam tournament Hard, outdoor 31 August – 13 September 2015	63 / 807	2R	(Austria) Andreas Haider-Maurer	52	Win	6–4, 6–1, 6–2
US Open; New York City, United States; Grand Slam tournament Hard, outdoor 31 August – 13 September 2015	64 / 808	3R	(Italy) Andreas Seppi (25)	25	Win	6–3, 7–5, 7–5
US Open; New York City, United States; Grand Slam tournament Hard, outdoor 31 August – 13 September 2015	65 / 809	4R	(Spain) Roberto Bautista Agut (23)	23	Win	6–3, 4–6, 6–4, 6–3
US Open; New York City, United States; Grand Slam tournament Hard, outdoor 31 August – 13 September 2015	66 / 810	QF	(Spain) Feliciano López (18)	18	Win	6–1, 3–6, 6–3, 7–6^{(7–2)}
US Open; New York City, United States; Grand Slam tournament Hard, outdoor 31 August – 13 September 2015	67 / 811	SF	(Croatia) Marin Čilić (9)	9	Win	6–0, 6–1, 6–2
US Open; New York City, United States; Grand Slam tournament Hard, outdoor 31 August – 13 September 2015	68 / 812	W	(Switzerland) Roger Federer (2)	2	Win (7)	6–4, 5–7, 6–4, 6–4
China Open; Beijing, China; ATP 500; Hard, outdoor 5 – 11 October 2015
China Open; Beijing, China; ATP 500; Hard, outdoor 5 – 11 October 2015	69 / 813	1R	(Italy) Simone Bolelli (Q)	62	Win	6–1, 6–1
China Open; Beijing, China; ATP 500; Hard, outdoor 5 – 11 October 2015	70 / 814	2R	(China) Zhang Ze (WC)	219	Win	6–2, 6–1
China Open; Beijing, China; ATP 500; Hard, outdoor 5 – 11 October 2015	71 / 815	QF	(United States) John Isner (6)	13	Win	6–2, 6–2
China Open; Beijing, China; ATP 500; Hard, outdoor 5 – 11 October 2015	72 / 816	SF	(Spain) David Ferrer (4)	7	Win	6–2, 6–3
China Open; Beijing, China; ATP 500; Hard, outdoor 5 – 11 October 2015	73 / 817	W	(Spain) Rafael Nadal (3)	8	Win (8)	6–2, 6–2
Shanghai Masters; Shanghai, China; ATP 1000; Hard, outdoor 12 – 18 October 2015
Shanghai Masters; Shanghai, China; ATP 1000; Hard, outdoor 12 – 18 October 2015	–	1R	Bye			
Shanghai Masters; Shanghai, China; ATP 1000; Hard, outdoor 12 – 18 October 2015	74 / 818	2R	(Slovakia) Martin Kližan	44	Win	6–2, 6–1
Shanghai Masters; Shanghai, China; ATP 1000; Hard, outdoor 12 – 18 October 2015	75 / 819	3R	(Spain) Feliciano López (15)	17	Win	6–2, 6–3
Shanghai Masters; Shanghai, China; ATP 1000; Hard, outdoor 12 – 18 October 2015	76 / 820	QF	(Australia) Bernard Tomic	20	Win	7–6^{(8–6)}, 6–1
Shanghai Masters; Shanghai, China; ATP 1000; Hard, outdoor 12 – 18 October 2015	77 / 821	SF	(United Kingdom) Andy Murray (3)	2	Win	6–1, 6–3
Shanghai Masters; Shanghai, China; ATP 1000; Hard, outdoor 12 – 18 October 2015	78 / 822	W	(France) Jo-Wilfried Tsonga (16)	15	Win (9)	6–2, 6–4
Paris Masters; Paris, France; ATP 1000; Hard, indoor 2 – 8 November 2015
Paris Masters; Paris, France; ATP 1000; Hard, indoor 2 – 8 November 2015	–	1R	Bye			
Paris Masters; Paris, France; ATP 1000; Hard, indoor 2 – 8 November 2015	79 / 823	2R	(Brazil) Thomaz Bellucci	40	Win	7–5, 6–3
Paris Masters; Paris, France; ATP 1000; Hard, indoor 2 – 8 November 2015	80 / 824	3R	(France) Gilles Simon (14)	15	Win	6–3, 7–5
Paris Masters; Paris, France; ATP 1000; Hard, indoor 2 – 8 November 2015	81 / 825	QF	(Czech Republic) Tomáš Berdych (5)	5	Win	7–6^{(7–3)}, 7–6^{(10–8)}
Paris Masters; Paris, France; ATP 1000; Hard, indoor 2 – 8 November 2015	82 / 826	SF	(Switzerland) Stan Wawrinka (4)	4	Win	6–3, 3–6, 6–0
Paris Masters; Paris, France; ATP 1000; Hard, indoor 2 – 8 November 2015	83 / 827	W	(United Kingdom) Andy Murray (2)	3	Win (10)	6–2, 6–4
ATP World Tour Finals; London, United Kingdom; ATP Finals; Hard, indoor 15 – 22 November 2015
ATP World Tour Finals; London, United Kingdom; ATP Finals; Hard, indoor 15 – 22 November 2015	84 / 828	RR	(Japan) Kei Nishikori (8)	8	Win	6–1, 6–1
ATP World Tour Finals; London, United Kingdom; ATP Finals; Hard, indoor 15 – 22 November 2015	85 / 829	RR	(Switzerland) Roger Federer (3)	3	Loss	5–7, 2–6
ATP World Tour Finals; London, United Kingdom; ATP Finals; Hard, indoor 15 – 22 November 2015	86 / 830	RR	(Czech Republic) Tomáš Berdych (6)	6	Win	6–3, 7–5
ATP World Tour Finals; London, United Kingdom; ATP Finals; Hard, indoor 15 – 22 November 2015	87 / 831	SF	(Spain) Rafael Nadal (5)	5	Win	6–3, 6–3
ATP World Tour Finals; London, United Kingdom; ATP Finals; Hard, indoor 15 – 22 November 2015	88 / 832	W	(Switzerland) Roger Federer (3)	3	Win (11)	6–3, 6–4

=== Doubles matches ===
Tournament	Match	Round	Opponents (seed or key)	Ranks	Result	Score
Qatar ExxonMobil Open; Doha, Qatar; ATP 250; Hard, outdoor 5 – 10 January 2015; Partner: (Serbia) Filip Krajinović
Qatar ExxonMobil Open; Doha, Qatar; ATP 250; Hard, outdoor 5 – 10 January 2015; Partner: (Serbia) Filip Krajinović	1 / 84	1R	(United States) Scott Lipsky / (United States) Rajeev Ram	#32 / #51	Win	6–2, 6–0
Qatar ExxonMobil Open; Doha, Qatar; ATP 250; Hard, outdoor 5 – 10 January 2015; Partner: (Serbia) Filip Krajinović	2 / 85	QF	(Colombia) Juan Sebastián Cabal / (Colombia) Robert Farah Maksoud (3)	#22 / #23	Win	6–3, 7–5
Qatar ExxonMobil Open; Doha, Qatar; ATP 250; Hard, outdoor 5 – 10 January 2015; Partner: (Serbia) Filip Krajinović	3 / 86	SF	(Argentina) Juan Mónaco / (Spain) Rafael Nadal	#151 / #—	Loss	6–7^{(3–7)}, 1–6
Dubai Duty Free Tennis Championships; Dubai, United Arab Emirates; ATP 500; Hard, outdoor 23 - 28 February 2015; Partner: (Serbia) Laslo Djere
Dubai Duty Free Tennis Championships; Dubai, United Arab Emirates; ATP 500; Hard, outdoor 23 - 28 February 2015; Partner: (Serbia) Laslo Djere	4 / 87	1R	(India) Rohan Bopanna / (Canada) Daniel Nestor (4)	#25 / #4	Loss	2–6, 5–7
Davis Cup by BNP Paribas World Group First Round; Kraljevo, Serbia; Davis Cup; Hard, indoor 6 – 8 March 2015; Partner: (Serbia) Nenad Zimonjić
Davis Cup by BNP Paribas World Group First Round; Kraljevo, Serbia; Davis Cup; Hard, indoor 6 – 8 March 2015; Partner: (Serbia) Nenad Zimonjić	5 / 88	1R; R3	(Croatia) Marin Draganja / (Croatia) Franko Škugor	#22 / #115	Win	6–3, 6–4, 6–1
Miami Open Presented by Itaú; Miami, United States; ATP 1000; Hard, outdoor 23 March– 5 April 2015; Partner: (Serbia) Janko Tipsarević
Miami Open Presented by Itaú; Miami, United States; ATP 1000; Hard, outdoor 23 March– 5 April 2015; Partner: (Serbia) Janko Tipsarević	6 / 89	1R	(Sweden) Robert Lindstedt / (Austria) Jürgen Melzer	#34 / #38	Loss	4–6, 6–3, [7–10]
Coupe Rogers; Montreal, Canada; ATP 1000; Hard, outdoor 10 – 16 August 2015; Partner: (Serbia) Janko Tipsarević
Coupe Rogers; Montreal, Canada; ATP 1000; Hard, outdoor 10 – 16 August 2015; Partner: (Serbia) Janko Tipsarević	7 / 90	1R	(Italy) Andreas Seppi / (Serbia) Viktor Troicki	#295 / #188	Win	6–4, 6–3
Coupe Rogers; Montreal, Canada; ATP 1000; Hard, outdoor 10 – 16 August 2015; Partner: (Serbia) Janko Tipsarević	8 / 91	2R	(India) Rohan Bopanna / (Romania) Florin Mergea (4)	#10 / #8	Win	6–3, 5–7, [10–3]
Coupe Rogers; Montreal, Canada; ATP 1000; Hard, outdoor 10 – 16 August 2015; Partner: (Serbia) Janko Tipsarević	9 / 92	QF	(United Kingdom) Jamie Murray / (Australia) John Peers (7)	#16 / #15	Win	6–3, 6–7^{(5–7)}, [10–7]
Coupe Rogers; Montreal, Canada; ATP 1000; Hard, outdoor 10 – 16 August 2015; Partner: (Serbia) Janko Tipsarević	10 / 93	SF	(Canada) Daniel Nestor / (France) Édouard Roger-Vasselin	#28 / #26	Loss	6–3, 1–6, [4–10]
China Open; Beijing, China; ATP 500; Hard, outdoor 5 – 11 October 2015; Partner: (Serbia) Djordje Djokovic
China Open; Beijing, China; ATP 500; Hard, outdoor 5 – 11 October 2015; Partner: (Serbia) Djordje Djokovic	11 / 94	1R	(China) Gong Maoxin / (New Zealand) Michael Venus (WC)	#137 / #49	Win	7–6^{(7–5)}, 6–7^{(6–8)}, [11–9]
China Open; Beijing, China; ATP 500; Hard, outdoor 5 – 11 October 2015; Partner: (Serbia) Djordje Djokovic	12 / 95	QF	(Canada) Vasek Pospisil / (United States) Jack Sock	#23 / #21	Loss	4–6, 1–6

=== Singles ===
Tournament	Match	Round	Opponent (seed or key)	Rank	Result	Score
2015 World Tennis Championship; Abu Dhabi, United Arab Emirates Hard, outdoor 1 – 3 January 2015
2015 World Tennis Championship; Abu Dhabi, United Arab Emirates Hard, outdoor 1 – 3 January 2015	–	QF	Bye			
2015 World Tennis Championship; Abu Dhabi, United Arab Emirates Hard, outdoor 1 – 3 January 2015	1	SF	(Switzerland) Stan Wawrinka (3)	4	Win	6–1, 6–2
2015 World Tennis Championship; Abu Dhabi, United Arab Emirates Hard, outdoor 1 – 3 January 2015	2	F	(United Kingdom) Andy Murray (4)	6	W/O	N/A

== Tournament schedule ==
=== Singles schedule ===
Date	Tournament	City	Category	Surface	2014 result	2014 points	2015 points	Outcome
05.01–10.01	Qatar Open	Doha	ATP World Tour 250	Hard	DNS	0	45	Quarterfinals (lost to Ivo Karlovic, 7–6^{(7–2)}, 6–7^{(7–9)}, 3–6)
19.01–01.02	Australian Open	Melbourne	Grand Slam	Hard	QF	360	2000	Winner (def. Andy Murray, 7–6^{(7–5)}, 6–7^{(4–7)}, 6–3, 6–0)
23.02–28.02	Dubai Tennis Championships	Dubai	ATP World Tour 500	Hard	SF	180	300	Final (lost to Roger Federer, 3–6, 5–7)
06.03–08.03	Davis Cup World Group: Serbia vs. Croatia	Kraljevo	Davis Cup	Hard (i)	1R	0	40	First Round: SRB def. (Croatia) CRO, 5–0; Serbia progresses to WG QF
09.03–22.03	Indian Wells Masters	Indian Wells	ATP World Tour Masters 1000	Hard	W	1000	1000	Winner (def. Roger Federer, 6–3, 6–7^{(5–7)}, 6–2)
25.03–05.04	Miami Open	Miami	ATP World Tour Masters 1000	Hard	W	1000	1000	Winner (def. Andy Murray, 7–6^{(7–3)}, 4–6, 6–0)
13.04–19.04	Monte-Carlo Masters	Monte-Carlo	ATP World Tour Masters 1000	Clay	SF	360	1000	Winner (def. Tomas Berdych, 7–5, 4–6, 6–3)
03.05–10.05	Madrid Open	Madrid	ATP World Tour Masters 1000	Clay	DNS	0	0	Withdrew
11.05–17.05	Italian Open	Rome	ATP World Tour Masters 1000	Clay	W	1000	1000	Winner (def. Roger Federer, 6–4, 6–3)
24.05–07.06	French Open	Paris	Grand Slam	Clay	F	1200	1200	Final (lost to Stan Wawrinka, 6–4, 4–6, 3–6, 4–6)
29.06–12.07	The Championships, Wimbledon	London	Grand Slam	Grass	W	2000	2000	Winner (def. Roger Federer, 7–6^{(7–1)}, 6–7^{(10–12)}, 6–4, 6–3)
17.07–19.07	Davis Cup World Group: Argentina vs. Serbia	Buenos Aires	Davis Cup	Clay (i)	1R	0	0	Quarterfinals: (Argentina) ARG def. (Serbia) SRB, 4–1 (Novak Djokovic withdrew)
10.08–16.08	Canadian Open	Montreal	ATP World Tour Masters 1000	Hard	3R	90	600	Final (lost to Andy Murray, 4–6, 6–4, 3–6)
17.08–23.08	Cincinnati Masters	Cincinnati	ATP World Tour Masters 1000	Hard	3R	90	600	Final (lost to Roger Federer, 6–7^{(1–7)}, 3–6)
31.08–13.09	US Open	New York	Grand Slam	Hard	SF	720	2000	Winner (def. Roger Federer, 6–4, 5–7, 6–4, 6–4)
05.10–11.10	China Open	Beijing	ATP World Tour 500	Hard	W	500	500	Winner (def. Rafael Nadal, 6–2, 6–2)
12.10–18.10	Shanghai Masters	Shanghai	ATP World Tour Masters 1000	Hard	SF	360	1000	Winner (def. Jo-Wilfried Tsonga, 6–2, 6–4)
02.11–08.11	Paris Masters	Paris	ATP World Tour Masters 1000	Hard (i)	W	1000	1000	Winner (def. Andy Murray, 6–2, 6–4)
15.11–22.11	ATP World Tour Finals	London	ATP World Tour Finals	Hard (i)	W	1500	1300	Winner (def. Roger Federer, 6–3, 6–4)
Total year-end points						11360	16585	▲5225 difference

=== Doubles schedule ===
Date	Tournament	City	Category	Surface	2014 result	2014 points	2015 points	Outcome
05.01–10.01	Qatar Open	Doha	ATP World Tour 250	Hard	1R	(0)	90	Semifinals (lost to Mónaco/Nadal, 6–7^{(3–7)}, 1–6)
23.02–28.02	Dubai Tennis Championships	Dubai	ATP World Tour 500	Hard	1R	(0)	(0)	First Round (lost to Bopanna/Nestor, 2–6, 5–7)
06.03–08.03	Davis Cup World Group: Serbia vs. Croatia	Kraljevo	Davis Cup	Hard (i)	1R	0	50	First Round: SRB def. (Croatia) CRO, 5–0; Serbia progresses to WG QF
09.03–22.03	Indian Wells Masters	Indian Wells	ATP World Tour Masters 1000	Hard	1R	(0)	0	Withdrew
25.03–05.04	Miami Open	Miami	ATP World Tour Masters 1000	Hard	DNS	0	(0)	First Round (lost to Lindstedt/Melzer, 4–6, 6–3, [7–10])
17.07–19.07	Davis Cup World Group: Argentina vs. Serbia	Buenos Aires	Davis Cup	Clay (i)	1R	0	0	Quarterfinals: (Argentina) ARG def. (Serbia) SRB, 4–1 (Novak Djokovic withdrew)
10.08–16.08	Canadian Open	Montreal	ATP World Tour Masters 1000	Hard	2R	90	360	Semifinals (lost to Nestor/Roger-Vasselin, 6–3, 1–6, [4–10])
05.10–11.10	China Open	Beijing	ATP World Tour 500	Hard	QF	(0)	90	Quarterfinals (lost to Pospisil/Sock, 4–6, 1–6)
Total year-end points						90	590	▲500 difference

== Yearly records ==
=== Head-to-head matchups ===
Novak Djokovic has a 31–5 record against the top 10, 25–1 against the top 11–50, 26–0 against other players; 64–6 against right-handed players and 18–0 against left-handed players.
Ordered by number of wins (Bolded number marks a top 10 player at the time of first match of the year, Italic means top 50; "L" means left-handed player).

- **(United Kingdom) Andy Murray** 6–1
- **(Switzerland) Roger Federer** 5–3
- **(Spain) Rafael Nadal (L)** 4–0
- **(Czech Republic) Tomáš Berdych** 4–0
- **(Spain) David Ferrer** 3–0
- **(Croatia) Marin Čilić** 3–0
- (United States) John Isner 3–0
- (Brazil) Thomaz Bellucci (L) 3–0
- **(Switzerland) Stan Wawrinka** 3–1
- **(Japan) Kei Nishikori** 2–0
- (France) Richard Gasquet 2–0
- (Spain) Feliciano López (L) 2–0
- (Ukraine) Alexandr Dolgopolov 2–0
- (Finland) Jarkko Nieminen (L) 2–0
- (Australia) Bernard Tomic 2–0
- (Slovakia) Martin Kližan (L) 2–0
- (Luxembourg) Gilles Müller (L) 2–0
- (Spain) Albert Ramos (L) 2–0
- (Austria) Andreas Haider-Maurer 2–0
- **(Canada) Milos Raonic** 1–0
- (France) Jo-Wilfried Tsonga 1–0
- (France) Gilles Simon 1–0
- (Spain) Fernando Verdasco (L) 1–0
- (Cyprus) Marcos Baghdatis 1–0
- (Spain) Nicolás Almagro 1–0
- (Latvia) Ernests Gulbis 1–0
- (South Africa) Kevin Anderson 1–0
- (Belgium) David Goffin 1–0
- (Spain) Roberto Bautista Agut 1–0
- (Germany) Philipp Kohlschreiber 1–0
- (Italy) Andreas Seppi 1–0
- (France) Benoît Paire 1–0
- (United States) Jack Sock 1–0
- (France) Jérémy Chardy 1–0
- (Canada) Vasek Pospisil 1–0
- (Ukraine) Sergiy Stakhovsky 1–0
- (Russia) Andrey Golubev 1–0
- (Italy) Simone Bolelli 1–0
- (Belgium) Steve Darcis 1–0
- (United Kingdom) Aljaž Bedene 1–0
- (Serbia) Dušan Lajović 1–0
- (Russia) Andrey Kuznetsov 1–0
- (Australia) Thanasi Kokkinakis 1–0
- (Brazil) João Souza 1–0
- (Turkey) Marsel İlhan 1–0
- (China) Zhang Ze 1–0
- (Croatia) Mate Delić 1–0
- (Croatia) Ivo Karlović 0–1

=== Finals ===
==== Singles: 15 (11 titles, 4 runners-up) ====
Category Grand Slam (3–1) ATP World Tour Finals (1–0) ATP World Tour Masters 1000 (6–2) ATP World Tour 500 (1–1) ATP World Tour 250 (0–0)	Titles by surface Hard (8–3) Clay (2–1) Grass (1–0)	Titles by conditions Outdoors (9–4) Indoors (2–0)

Result	No.	Date	Tournament	Surface	Opponent	Score
Win	49.	February 2015	Australian Open, Australia (5)	Hard	(United Kingdom) Andy Murray	7–6^{(7–5)}, 6–7^{(4–7)}, 6–3, 6–0
Loss	23.	February 2015	Dubai Tennis Championships, United Arab Emirates	Hard	(Switzerland) Roger Federer	3–6, 5–7
Win	50.	March 2015	Indian Wells Masters, United States (4)	Hard	(Switzerland) Roger Federer	6–3, 6–7^{(5–7)}, 6–2
Win	51.	April 2015	Miami Open, United States (5)	Hard	(United Kingdom) Andy Murray	7–6^{(7–3)}, 4–6, 6–0
Win	52.	April 2015	Monte-Carlo Masters, Monaco (2)	Clay	(Czech Republic) Tomáš Berdych	7–5, 4–6, 6–3
Win	53.	May 2015	Italian Open, Italy (4)	Clay	(Switzerland) Roger Federer	6–4, 6–3
Loss	24.	June 2015	French Open, France (3)	Clay	(Switzerland) Stan Wawrinka	6–4, 4–6, 3–6, 4–6
Win	54.	July 2015	The Championships, Wimbledon, Great Britain (3)	Grass	(Switzerland) Roger Federer	7–6^{(7–1)}, 6–7^{(10–12)}, 6–4, 6–3
Loss	25.	August 2015	Canadian Open, Canada	Hard	(United Kingdom) Andy Murray	4–6, 6–4, 3–6
Loss	26.	August 2015	Cincinnati Masters, United States (5)	Hard	(Switzerland) Roger Federer	6–7^{(1–7)}, 3–6
Win	55.	September 2015	US Open, United States (2)	Hard	(Switzerland) Roger Federer	6–4, 5–7, 6–4, 6–4
Win	56.	October 2015	China Open, China (6)	Hard	(Spain) Rafael Nadal	6–2, 6–2
Win	57.	October 2015	Shanghai Masters, China (3)	Hard	(France) Jo-Wilfried Tsonga	6–2, 6–4
Win	58.	November 2015	Paris Masters, France (4)	Hard (i)	(United Kingdom) Andy Murray	6–2, 6–4
Win	59.	November 2015	ATP World Tour Finals, Great Britain (5)	Hard (i)	(Switzerland) Roger Federer	6–3, 6–4

=== Earnings ===
- **Bold** font denotes tournament win

#	Venue	Singles Prize Money	Year-to-date
1.	Qatar ExxonMobil Open	$31,690	$31,690
2.	**Australian Open**	**A$3,100,000**	$2,577,720
3.	Dubai Duty Free Tennis Championships	$227,640	$2,805,360
4.	**BNP Paribas Open**	**$900,400**	$3,705,760
5.	**Miami Open presented by Itaú**	**$900,400**	$4,606,160
6.	**Monte-Carlo Rolex Masters**	**€628,100**	$5,271,757
7.	**Internazionali BNL d’Italia**	**€628,100**	$5,975,103
8.	Roland Garros	€900,000	$6,965,733
9.	**Wimbledon**	**£1,880,000**	$9,924,289
10.	Coupe Rogers	$336,000	$10,260,289
11.	Western & Southern Open	$358,375	$10,618,664
12.	**US Open**	**$3,800,000**	$14,418,664
13.	**China Open**	**$654,725**	$15,073,389
14.	**Shanghai Rolex Masters**	**$913,600**	$15,986,989
15.	**BNP Paribas Masters**	**€653,700**	$16,706,125
16.	**ATP World Tour Finals**	**$2,061,000**	$18,767,125
Bonus Pool Number **#1**		**$2,825,000**	$21,592,125
Doubles			$54,020
Total			**$21,646,145**
As of November 23, 2015

- source：Novak Djokovic 2015 Season

=== Awards and nominations ===
- Laureus World Sports Award for Sportsman of the Year
- ATP World Tour Player of the Year
- Best Male Tennis Player ESPY Award
- ITF Men's World Champion
- Best Sportsman by Olympic Committee of Serbia
- Golden Badge of DSL Sport
- Eurosport International Athlete of the Year

== See also ==
- 2015 ATP World Tour
- 2015 Roger Federer tennis season
- 2015 Rafael Nadal tennis season
- 2015 Andy Murray tennis season
- 2015 Stan Wawrinka tennis season
