= 2015 Città di Vercelli – Trofeo Multimed – Singles =

Trofeo Multimed – Singles
- 2015 Città di Vercelli – Trofeo Multimed

Final
- Champion: (Japan) Taro Daniel
- Runner-up: (Italy) Filippo Volandri
- Score: 6–3, 1–6, 6–4

Events
Singles	Doubles
← 2014 ·	Città di Vercelli – Trofeo Multimed

Simone Bolelli was the defending champion, but he did not participate this year. He played in Bucharest instead.

Taro Daniel won the title, defeating Filippo Volandri in the final, 6–3, 1–6, 6–4.

== Seeds ==
1. ~~(Serbia) Filip Krajinović~~ (withdrew)
2. (Germany) Dustin Brown (first round)
3. (Netherlands) Igor Sijsling (first round)
4. (United Kingdom) Kyle Edmund (quarterfinals)
5. (Belgium) Kimmer Coppejans (first round)
6. (Italy) Marco Cecchinato (semifinals)
7. (Croatia) Mate Delić (first round)
8. (Italy) Andrea Arnaboldi (first round)

== Draw ==
=== Key ===
- Q = Qualifier
- WC = Wild card
- LL = Lucky loser
- Alt = Alternate
- SE = Special exempt
- PR = Protected ranking
- ITF = ITF entry
- JE = Junior exempt
- w/o = Walkover
- r = Retired
- d = Defaulted
- SR = Special ranking

=== Finals ===
Semifinals
(Japan) Taro Daniel	6	6
(Spain) Rubén Ramírez Hidalgo	3	1
6	(Italy) Marco Cecchinato	6^{2}	3
(Italy) Filippo Volandri	7^{7}	6

Final
(Japan) Taro Daniel	6	1	6
(Italy) Filippo Volandri	3	6	4

=== Top half ===
First round
LL	(Italy) Omar Giacalone	3	1
(Bosnia and Herzegovina) M Bašić	6	6
(Japan) T Daniel	6	7
(Slovakia) J Kovalík	4	5
(Croatia) A Veić	7	6
(Switzerland) H Laaksonen	5	2
(Italy) M Viola	6	6
8	(Italy) A Arnaboldi	2	1
4	(United Kingdom) K Edmund	7^{7}	6
Q	(France) M Hamou	6^{3}	1
(Italy) R Marcora	6	6
(Ukraine) D Molchanov	2	3
WC	(Italy) G Mager	2	1
(Spain) R Ramírez Hidalgo	6	6
(Slovakia) A Martin	3	7	6
7	(Croatia) M Delić	6	5	1

Second round
(Bosnia and Herzegovina) M Bašić	3	1
(Japan) T Daniel	6	6
(Croatia) A Veić	6	6
(Italy) M Viola	0	1
4	(United Kingdom) K Edmund	6	6
(Italy) R Marcora	4	2
(Spain) R Ramírez Hidalgo	6	6
(Slovakia) A Martin	3	2

Quarterfinals
(Japan) T Daniel	6	7
(Croatia) A Veić	1	5
4	(United Kingdom) K Edmund	6	3	4
(Spain) R Ramírez Hidalgo	3	6	6

Semifinals
(Japan) T Daniel	6	6
(Spain) R Ramírez Hidalgo	3	1

=== Bottom half ===
First round
6	(Italy) M Cecchinato	6	6
Q	(Monaco) B Balleret	2	1
(Spain) I Cervantes	7^{7}	4	3
WC	(Italy) S Napolitano	6^{1}	6	6
WC	(Italy) S Caruso	7^{7}	6
Q	(Croatia) A Šančić	6^{4}	1
WC	(Italy) G Quinzi	6	7
3	(Netherlands) I Sijsling	2	5
5	(Belgium) K Coppejans	1	4
(Chile) H Podlipnik Castillo	6	6
(Italy) F Volandri	7	6
Q	(Switzerland) Y Marti	5	3
(France) E Couacaud	2	1
(Belgium) A De Greef	6	6
(France) T Lamasine	6	3	6
2	(Germany) D Brown	4	6	3

Second round
6	(Italy) M Cecchinato	6	6
WC	(Italy) S Napolitano	4	4
WC	(Italy) S Caruso	7^{7}	3	6
WC	(Italy) G Quinzi	6^{3}	6	3
(Chile) H Podlipnik Castillo	2	1
(Italy) F Volandri	6	6
(Belgium) A De Greef	6	6
(France) T Lamasine	3	2

Quarterfinals
6	(Italy) M Cecchinato	6	6
WC	(Italy) S Caruso	3	4
(Italy) F Volandri	7	6
(Belgium) A De Greef	5	4

Semifinals
6	(Italy) M Cecchinato	6^{2}	3
(Italy) F Volandri	7^{7}	6
