= 2014 Città di Vercelli – Trofeo Multimed – Doubles =

Trofeo Multimed – Doubles
- 2014 Città di Vercelli – Trofeo Multimed

Final
- Champions: (Italy) Matteo Donati (Italy) Stefano Napolitano
- Runners-up: (France) Pierre-Hugues Herbert (France) Albano Olivetti
- Score: 7–6^{(7–2)}, 6–3

Events
Singles	Doubles
Città di Vercelli – Trofeo Multimed	· 2015 →

This was the first edition of the tournament.

Donati and Napolitano won the title, defeating Pierre-Hugues Herbert and Albano Olivetti in the final, 7–6^{(7–2)}, 6–3.

== Seeds ==
1. (Poland) Mateusz Kowalczyk / (India) Purav Raja (first round)
2. (Germany) Dustin Brown / (Germany) Alexander Satschko (first round)
3. (Italy) Alessandro Motti / (Italy) Potito Starace (quarterfinals)
4. (Italy) Riccardo Ghedin / (Italy) Claudio Grassi (first round)

== Draw ==
=== Key ===
- Q = Qualifier
- WC = Wild card
- LL = Lucky loser
- Alt = Alternate
- SE = Special exempt
- PR = Protected ranking
- ITF = ITF entry
- JE = Junior exempt
- w/o = Walkover
- r = Retired
- d = Defaulted
- SR = Special ranking

=== Draw ===
First round
1	(Poland) M Kowalczyk (India) P Raja	2	4
(Netherlands) S Fransen (Netherlands) W Koolhof	6	6
(Philippines) R Gonzales (New Zealand) A Sitak	3	6	[8]
(France) P-H Herbert (France) A Olivetti	6	4	[10]
3	(Italy) A Motti (Italy) P Starace	6	6
(Slovenia) A Bedene (France) J Eysseric	2	4
WC	(Italy) Alberto Bagarello (Italy) Alberto Giraudo	6	3	[2]
WC	(Italy) Pietro Rondoni (Italy) S Travaglia	3	6	[10]
WC	(Italy) M Donati (Italy) S Napolitano	6	6
(Italy) A Arnaboldi (Italy) M Crugnola	3	3
(Czech Republic) J Hájek (Slovakia) A Martin	6	6
4	(Italy) R Ghedin (Italy) C Grassi	4	2
(Italy) M Cecchinato (Italy) A Giannessi	6	6
(France) G Burquier (Belgium) Y Mertens	1	4
Alt	(Austria) Lukas Jastraunig (Austria) Marc Rath	6	6^{3}	[10]
2	(Germany) D Brown (Germany) A Satschko	3	7^{7}	[7]

Quarterfinals
(Netherlands) S Fransen (Netherlands) W Koolhof	3	4
(France) P-H Herbert (France) A Olivetti	6	6
3	(Italy) A Motti (Italy) P Starace	5	6^{3}
WC	(Italy) P Rondoni (Italy) S Travaglia	7	7^{7}
WC	(Italy) M Donati (Italy) S Napolitano	1	6	[10]
(Czech Republic) J Hájek (Slovakia) A Martin	6	4	[5]
(Italy) M Cecchinato (Italy) A Giannessi	4	4
Alt	(Austria) L Jastraunig (Austria) M Rath	6	6

Semifinals
(France) P-H Herbert (France) A Olivetti	6	6
WC	(Italy) P Rondoni (Italy) S Travaglia	2	3
WC	(Italy) M Donati (Italy) S Napolitano	6	6
Alt	(Austria) L Jastraunig (Austria) M Rath	1	0

Final
(France) P-H Herbert (France) A Olivetti	6^{2}	3
WC	(Italy) M Donati (Italy) S Napolitano	7^{7}	6
