= 2015 Città di Vercelli – Trofeo Multimed – Doubles =

Trofeo Multimed – Doubles
- 2015 Città di Vercelli – Trofeo Multimed

Final
- Champions: (Italy) Andrea Arnaboldi (Chile) Hans Podlipnik-Castillo
- Runners-up: (Belarus) Sergey Betov (Russia) Michail Elgin
- Score: 6–7^{(5–7)}, 7–5, [10–3]

Events
Singles	Doubles
← 2014 ·	Città di Vercelli – Trofeo Multimed

Matteo Donati and Stefano Napolitano were the defending champions, but Donati did not participate. Napolitano partnered with Lorenzo Sonego, but they lost to Andrea Arnaboldi and Hans Podlipnik-Castillo in the quarterfinals.

Arnaboldi and Podlipnik-Castillo won the title, defeating Sergey Betov and Michail Elgin 6–7^{(5–7)}, 7–5, [10–3] in the final.

== Seeds ==
1. (Germany) Martin Emmrich / (Sweden) Andreas Siljeström (first round)
2. (Germany) Dustin Brown / (Germany) Philipp Petzschner (first round)
3. (Germany) Gero Kretschmer / (Germany) Alexander Satschko (first round)
4. (China) Gong Maoxin / (Chinese Taipei) Peng Hsien-yin (first round)

== Draw ==
=== Key ===
- Q = Qualifier
- WC = Wild card
- LL = Lucky loser
- Alt = Alternate
- SE = Special exempt
- PR = Protected ranking
- ITF = ITF entry
- JE = Junior exempt
- w/o = Walkover
- r = Retired
- d = Defaulted
- SR = Special ranking

First round
1	(Germany) M Emmrich (Sweden) A Siljeström	7	6^{4}	[9]
(Italy) A Arnaboldi (Chile) H Podlipnik-Castillo	5	7^{7}	[11]
WC	(Italy) S Napolitano (Italy) L Sonego	6	1	[10]
(Italy) A Motti (France) S Robert	3	6	[5]
4	(China) M Gong (Chinese Taipei) H-y Peng	3	4
(Netherlands) W Koolhof (Netherlands) M Middelkoop	6	6
(Poland) M Kowalczyk (Slovakia) I Zelenay	6	7^{7}
WC	(Italy) M Cecchinato (Italy) Pietro Rondoni	3	6^{5}
(Germany) D Meffert (Netherlands) I Sijsling	6^{5}	7	[10]
(Monaco) R Arneodo (Monaco) B Balleret	7^{7}	5	[7]
WC	(Italy) G Mager (Italy) G Quinzi	6	6
3	(Germany) G Kretschmer (Germany) A Satschko	4	3
(Philippines) R Gonzales (United Kingdom) D Walsh	4	6	[10]
(Serbia) I Bozoljac (Ukraine) D Molchanov	6	1	[1]
(Belarus) S Betov (Russia) M Elgin	6^{2}	7^{7}	[12]
2	(Germany) D Brown (Germany) P Petzschner	7^{7}	6^{2}	[10]

Quarterfinals
(Italy) A Arnaboldi (Chile) H Podlipnik-Castillo	5	7	[10]
WC	(Italy) S Napolitano (Italy) L Sonego	7	5	[6]
(Netherlands) W Koolhof (Netherlands) M Middelkoop	6	7
(Poland) M Kowalczyk (Slovakia) I Zelenay	3	5
(Germany) D Meffert (Netherlands) I Sijsling
WC	(Italy) G Mager (Italy) G Quinzi	w/o
(Philippines) R Gonzales (United Kingdom) D Walsh	2	3
(Belarus) S Betov (Russia) M Elgin	6	6

Semifinals
(Italy) A Arnaboldi (Chile) H Podlipnik-Castillo	6	2	[10]
(Netherlands) W Koolhof (Netherlands) M Middelkoop	4	6	[2]
(Germany) D Meffert (Netherlands) I Sijsling	6	6^{5}	[1]
(Belarus) S Betov (Russia) M Elgin	1	7^{7}	[10]

Final
(Italy) A Arnaboldi (Chile) H Podlipnik-Castillo	6^{5}	7	[10]
(Belarus) S Betov (Russia) M Elgin	7^{7}	5	[3]
