= 2014 Città di Vercelli – Trofeo Multimed – Singles =

Trofeo Multimed – Singles
- 2014 Città di Vercelli – Trofeo Multimed

Final
- Champion: (Italy) Simone Bolelli
- Runner-up: (Croatia) Mate Delić
- Score: 6–2, 6–2

Events
Singles	Doubles
Città di Vercelli – Trofeo Multimed	· 2015 →

This was the first edition of the tournament.

Simone Bolelli won the title, defeating Mate Delić in the final, 6–2, 6–2.

== Seeds ==
1. (Germany) Dustin Brown (second round)
2. (Germany) Jan-Lennard Struff (first round)
3. (Belgium) David Goffin (second round)
4. (Slovenia) Aljaž Bedene (first round)
5. (Czech Republic) Jan Hájek (second round)
6. (France) Pierre-Hugues Herbert (first round)
7. (Slovakia) Andrej Martin (first round)
8. (Italy) Potito Starace (quarterfinals)

== Draw ==
=== Key ===
- Q = Qualifier
- WC = Wild card
- LL = Lucky loser
- Alt = Alternate
- SE = Special exempt
- PR = Protected ranking
- ITF = ITF entry
- JE = Junior exempt
- w/o = Walkover
- r = Retired
- d = Defaulted
- SR = Special ranking

=== Finals ===
Semifinals
(Italy) Marco Cecchinato	7	6^{5}	0^{r}
Q	(Croatia) Mate Delić	5	7^{7}	2
WC	(Italy) Simone Bolelli	7^{7}	4	6
(Italy) Andrea Arnaboldi	6^{3}	6	4

Final
Q	(Croatia) Mate Delić	2	2
WC	(Italy) Simone Bolelli	6	6

=== Top half ===
First round
1	(Germany) D Brown	1	6	6
Q	(Italy) F Gaio	6	3	4
(Italy) M Cecchinato	6	6
(Croatia) K Mesaroš	3	2
Q	(Austria) N Reissig	6	6
(France) A Olivetti	3	4
WC	(Italy) M Donati	6^{3}	6^{5}
8	(Italy) P Starace	7^{7}	7^{7}
3	(Belgium) D Goffin	6	6
WC	(Italy) S Napolitano	1	2
(Switzerland) Y Marti	5	2
WC	(Italy) S Travaglia	7	6
(Belgium) Y Mertens	0	4
Q	(Croatia) M Delić	6	6
PR	(France) G Rufin	6	2^{r}
5	(Czech Republic) J Hájek	3	5

Second round
1	(Germany) D Brown	1	3
(Italy) M Cecchinato	6	6
Q	(Austria) N Reissig	6^{4}	3
8	(Italy) P Starace	7^{7}	6
3	(Belgium) D Goffin	4	3
WC	(Italy) S Travaglia	6	6
Q	(Croatia) M Delić	6	6
5	(Czech Republic) J Hájek	1	4

Quarterfinals
(Italy) M Cecchinato	7	6
8	(Italy) P Starace	5	3
WC	(Italy) S Travaglia	6	5	0
Q	(Croatia) M Delić	4	7	6

Semifinals
(Italy) M Cecchinato	7	6^{5}	0^{r}
Q	(Croatia) M Delić	5	7^{7}	2

=== Bottom half ===
First round
7	(Slovakia) A Martin	4	6	5
(Uruguay) P Cuevas	6	2	7
Alt	(Monaco) B Balleret	4	3
WC	(Italy) S Bolelli	6	6
(France) G Burquier	2	4
(France) D Guez	6	6
Q	(United Kingdom) K Edmund	6	6
4	(Slovenia) A Bedene	3	2
6	(France) P-H Herbert	4	1
(Canada) F Peliwo	6	6
(France) M Teixeira	1	6	1
(France) J Eysseric	6	2	6
(Italy) A Arnaboldi	6	6
(Slovakia) N Gomboš	3	3
(Belarus) U Ignatik	6	6
2	(Germany) J-L Struff	4	2

Second round
(Uruguay) P Cuevas	7^{7}	4	6^{9}
WC	(Italy) S Bolelli	6^{2}	6	7^{11}
(France) D Guez	3	2
Q	(United Kingdom) K Edmund	6	6
(Canada) F Peliwo	1	0
(France) J Eysseric	6	6
(Italy) A Arnaboldi	6	6
(Belarus) U Ignatik	1	1

Quarterfinals
WC	(Italy) S Bolelli	7^{7}	6^{3}	6
Q	(United Kingdom) K Edmund	6^{3}	7^{7}	0
(France) J Eysseric	2	3
(Italy) A Arnaboldi	6	6

Semifinals
WC	(Italy) S Bolelli	7^{7}	4	6
(Italy) A Arnaboldi	6^{3}	6	4
