= 2014 AON Open Challenger – Doubles =

Doubles
- 2014 AON Open Challenger

Final
- Champions: (Italy) Daniele Bracciali (Italy) Potito Starace
- Runners-up: (Germany) Frank Moser (Germany) Alexander Satschko
- Score: 6–3, 6–4

Events
Singles	Doubles
← 2013 ·	AON Open Challenger	· 2015 →

Daniele Bracciali and Potito Starace won the tournament, beating Frank Moser and Alexander Satschko 6–3, 6–4

== Seeds ==
1. (Sweden) Johan Brunström / (United States) Nicholas Monroe (quarterfinals)
2. (Italy) Daniele Bracciali / (Italy) Potito Starace (champions)
3. (Poland) Mateusz Kowalczyk / (New Zealand) Artem Sitak (first round)
4. (Germany) Dustin Brown / (Germany) Christopher Kas (semifinals)

== Draw ==
=== Key ===
- Q = Qualifier
- WC = Wild card
- LL = Lucky loser
- Alt = Alternate
- SE = Special exempt
- PR = Protected ranking
- ITF = ITF entry
- JE = Junior exempt
- w/o = Walkover
- r = Retired
- d = Defaulted
- SR = Special ranking

=== Draw ===
First round
1	(Sweden) J Brunström (United States) N Monroe	6	6^{3}	[10]
(Croatia) F Škugor (Slovakia) I Zelenay	2	7^{7}	[8]
(Germany) F Moser (Germany) A Satschko	6	6^{6}	[10]
(Monaco) R Arneodo (Hungary) M Fucsovics	4	7^{8}	[6]
4	(Germany) D Brown (Germany) C Kas	7	6
Alt	(Belarus) U Ignatik (Slovakia) J Kovalík	5	2
(Slovenia) A Bedene (Croatia) M Delić	6^{7}	2
(Monaco) B Balleret (Italy) A Motti	7^{9}	6
(Germany) A Beck (France) B Paire	0	6	[10]
(Bosnia and Herzegovina) D Džumhur (Bosnia and Herzegovina) A Šetkić	6	3	[6]
WC	(Italy) A Basso (Italy) Francesco Picco	4	6	[10]
3	(Poland) M Kowalczyk (New Zealand) A Sitak	6	3	[8]
WC	(Italy) M Cecchinato (Italy) A Giannessi	3	6	[10]
PR	(Portugal) G Elias (Portugal) P Sousa	6	3	[8]
WC	(Italy) Alessandro Ceppellini (Italy) G Naso	5	2
2	(Italy) D Bracciali (Italy) P Starace	7	6

Quarterfinals
1	(Sweden) J Brunström (United States) N Monroe	7^{7}	5	[10]
(Germany) F Moser (Germany) A Satschko	6^{3}	7	[12]
4	(Germany) D Brown (Germany) C Kas	6	7^{7}
(Monaco) B Balleret (Italy) A Motti	4	6^{4}
(Germany) A Beck (France) B Paire	1	6	[10]
WC	(Italy) A Basso (Italy) F Picco	6	2	[6]
WC	(Italy) M Cecchinato (Italy) A Giannessi	2	5
2	(Italy) D Bracciali (Italy) P Starace	6	7

Semifinals
(Germany) F Moser (Germany) A Satschko	6^{3}	6	[11]
4	(Germany) D Brown (Germany) C Kas	7^{7}	4	[9]
(Germany) A Beck (France) B Paire	6	6^{8}	r
2	(Italy) D Bracciali (Italy) P Starace	4	7^{10}

Final
(Germany) F Moser (Germany) A Satschko	3	4
2	(Italy) D Bracciali (Italy) P Starace	6	6
