= 2014 AON Open Challenger =

- Date: 1– September
- Edition: 11th
- Surface: Clay
- Location: Genoa, Italy

Champions

Singles
- (Spain) Albert Ramos

Doubles
- (Italy) Daniele Bracciali / (Italy) Potito Starace
← 2013 ·	AON Open Challenger	· 2015 →

The 2014 AON Open Challenger was a professional tennis tournament played on clay courts. It was the eleventh edition of the tournament which was part of the 2014 ATP Challenger Tour. It took place in Genoa, Italy, between 1 and 7 September 2014.

== Singles main-draw entrants ==
=== Seeds ===
Country	Player	Rank^{1}	Seed
ESP	Albert Ramos	95	1
GER	Dustin Brown	97	2
FRA	Benoît Paire	98	3
ESP	Albert Montañés	114	4
GER	Andreas Beck	115	5
BIH	Damir Džumhur	119	6
SLO	Aljaž Bedene	133	7
POR	Gastão Elias	142	8

- ^{1} Rankings are as of August 25, 2014.

=== Other entrants ===
The following players received wildcards into the singles main draw:

- (Italy) Alessandro Giannessi
- (Italy) Gianluca Mager
- (Italy) Francesco Picco
- (Italy) Matteo Trevisan

The following players entered into the singles main draw as alternates:

- (Croatia) Mate Delić
- (Belarus) Uladzimir Ignatik

The following player entered into the singles main draw as a special exemption:

- (Serbia) Viktor Troicki

The following players received entry from the qualifying draw:

- (Croatia) Viktor Galović
- (Slovakia) Jozef Kovalík
- (Italy) Gianluca Naso
- (Italy) Adelchi Virgili

== Champions ==
=== Singles ===
- (Spain) Albert Ramos def. (Croatia) Mate Delić 6–1, 7–5

=== Doubles ===
- (Italy) Daniele Bracciali / (Italy) Potito Starace def. (Germany) Frank Moser / (Germany) Alexander Satschko 6–3, 6–4
