= 2014 AON Open Challenger – Singles =

Singles
- 2014 AON Open Challenger

Final
- Champion: (Spain) Albert Ramos
- Runner-up: (Croatia) Mate Delić
- Score: 6–1, 7–5

Events
Singles	Doubles
← 2013 ·	AON Open Challenger	· 2015 →

Albert Ramos won the tournament, beating Mate Delić 6–1, 7–5 in the final.

== Seeds ==
1. (Spain) Albert Ramos (champion)
2. (Germany) Dustin Brown (first round)
3. (France) Benoît Paire (second round)
4. (Spain) Albert Montañés (first round)
5. (Germany) Andreas Beck (semifinals)
6. (Bosnia and Herzegovina) Damir Džumhur (second round)
7. (Slovenia) Aljaž Bedene (quarterfinals)
8. (Portugal) Gastão Elias (first round)

== Draw ==
=== Key ===
- Q = Qualifier
- WC = Wild card
- LL = Lucky loser
- Alt = Alternate
- SE = Special exempt
- PR = Protected ranking
- ITF = ITF entry
- JE = Junior exempt
- w/o = Walkover
- r = Retired
- d = Defaulted
- SR = Special ranking

=== Finals ===
Semifinals
1	(Spain) Albert Ramos	6	7
(Hungary) Márton Fucsovics	1	5
5	(Germany) Andreas Beck	4	5
Alt	(Croatia) Mate Delić	6	7

Final
1	(Spain) Albert Ramos	6	7
Alt	(Croatia) Mate Delić	1	5

=== Top half ===
First round
1	(Spain) A Ramos	7	5	6
Q	(Italy) A Virgili	5	7	3
(Bosnia and Herzegovina) A Šetkić	6	7^{7}
WC	(Italy) Francesco Picco	3	6^{3}
(Czech Republic) J Hájek	7	6
WC	(Italy) G Mager	5	4
(Italy) A Arnaboldi	6	3	6^{3}
7	(Slovenia) A Bedene	3	6	7^{7}
4	(Spain) A Montañés	2	4
(Hungary) M Fucsovics	6	6
WC	(Italy) A Giannessi	5	2
(Argentina) G Andreozzi	7	6
Alt	(Belarus) U Ignatik	6	6
(Italy) F Volandri	3	4
(Australia) J Kubler	6	6
8	(Portugal) G Elias	4	4

Second round
1	(Spain) A Ramos	6	6
(Bosnia and Herzegovina) A Šetkić	1	3
(Czech Republic) J Hájek	4	4
7	(Slovenia) A Bedene	6	6
(Hungary) M Fucsovics	3	6	6
(Argentina) G Andreozzi	6	3	4
Alt	(Belarus) U Ignatik	6	2	3
(Australia) J Kubler	2	6	6

Quarterfinals
1	(Spain) A Ramos	6	6
7	(Slovenia) A Bedene	3	2
(Hungary) M Fucsovics	7^{9}	1	7^{7}
(Australia) J Kubler	6^{7}	6	6^{3}

Semifinals
1	(Spain) A Ramos	6	7
(Hungary) M Fucsovics	1	5

=== Bottom half ===
First round
5	(Germany) A Beck	6	6
(Italy) F Gaio	2	4
(Italy) P Starace	4	1
(Sweden) C Lindell	6	6
(Italy) M Cecchinato	6	6
(Georgia (country)) N Basilashvili	4	2
(Portugal) P Sousa	0	2
3	(France) B Paire	6	6
6	(Bosnia and Herzegovina) D Džumhur	6	6
Q	(Slovakia) J Kovalík	4	4
Q	(Croatia) V Galović	6	3	1
Alt	(Croatia) M Delić	4	6	6
WC	(Italy) M Trevisan	6^{4}	6	6
Q	(Italy) G Naso	7^{7}	4	4
SE	(Serbia) V Troicki	6	7^{7}
2	(Germany) D Brown	1	6^{4}

Second round
5	(Germany) A Beck	6	6
(Sweden) C Lindell	4	3
(Italy) M Cecchinato	6	7^{7}
3	(France) B Paire	2	6^{3}
6	(Bosnia and Herzegovina) D Džumhur	4	6	4
Alt	(Croatia) M Delić	6	2	6
WC	(Italy) M Trevisan	6	3	6^{4}
SE	(Serbia) V Troicki	4	6	7^{7}

Quarterfinals
5	(Germany) A Beck	7	6
(Italy) M Cecchinato	5	3
Alt	(Croatia) M Delić	7^{8}	1	7^{10}
SE	(Serbia) V Troicki	6^{6}	6	6^{8}

Semifinals
5	(Germany) A Beck	4	5
Alt	(Croatia) M Delić	6	7
