= 2013 AON Open Challenger – Doubles =

Doubles
- 2013 AON Open Challenger

Final
- Champions: (Italy) Daniele Bracciali (Austria) Oliver Marach
- Runners-up: (Croatia) Marin Draganja (Croatia) Mate Pavić
- Score: 6–3, 2–6, [11–9]

Events
Singles	Doubles
← 2012 ·	AON Open Challenger	· 2014 →

Daniele Bracciali and Oliver Marach won the title, beating Marin Draganja and Mate Pavić 6–3, 2–6, [11–9]

== Seeds ==
1. (Italy) Daniele Bracciali / (Austria) Oliver Marach (champions)
2. (Poland) Mateusz Kowalczyk / (Slovakia) Igor Zelenay (semifinals)
3. (Germany) Dustin Brown / (Germany) Philipp Marx (first round)
4. (Croatia) Marin Draganja / (Croatia) Mate Pavić (final)

== Draw ==
=== Key ===
- Q = Qualifier
- WC = Wild card
- LL = Lucky loser
- Alt = Alternate
- SE = Special exempt
- PR = Protected ranking
- ITF = ITF entry
- JE = Junior exempt
- w/o = Walkover
- r = Retired
- d = Defaulted
- SR = Special ranking

=== Draw ===
First round
1	(Italy) D Bracciali (Austria) O Marach	6	6
(Slovakia) A Martin (Czech Republic) J Mertl	1	2
(Spain) P Carreño Busta (Spain) A Ramos	7^{7}	6
(Argentina) R Olivo (Argentina) M Trungelliti	6^{5}	4
3	(Germany) D Brown (Germany) P Marx	4	7^{7}	[12]
WC	(Italy) A Basso (Italy) A di Mauro	6	6^{2}	[14]
WC	(Italy) M Crugnola (Italy) S Ianni	7^{7}	7^{7}
(Italy) G Naso (Italy) Francesco Picco	6^{4}	6^{4}
(Italy) A Motti (Italy) P Starace	6	6
(Italy) M Cecchinato (Italy) A Giannessi	2	0
(Italy) A Arnaboldi (Argentina) DS Schwartzman	4	3
4	(Croatia) M Draganja (Croatia) M Pavić	6	6
(Serbia) B Pašanski (Israel) A Weintraub	6^{3}	3
(Russia) T Gabashvili (Sweden) A Siljeström	7^{7}	6
(United States) J Cerretani (Canada) A Shamasdin	6^{2}	2
2	(Poland) M Kowalczyk (Slovakia) I Zelenay	7^{7}	6

Quarterfinals
1	(Italy) D Bracciali (Austria) O Marach	w/o
(Spain) P Carreño Busta (Spain) A Ramos
WC	(Italy) A Basso (Italy) A di Mauro	6^{2}	5
WC	(Italy) M Crugnola (Italy) S Ianni	7^{7}	7
(Italy) A Motti (Italy) P Starace	6^{9}	2
4	(Croatia) M Draganja (Croatia) M Pavić	7^{11}	6
(Russia) T Gabashvili (Sweden) A Siljeström	3	6^{3}
2	(Poland) M Kowalczyk (Slovakia) I Zelenay	6	7^{7}

Semifinals
1	(Italy) D Bracciali (Austria) O Marach	6	6
WC	(Italy) M Crugnola (Italy) S Ianni	0	3
4	(Croatia) M Draganja (Croatia) M Pavić	6	6
2	(Poland) M Kowalczyk (Slovakia) I Zelenay	4	4

Final
1	(Italy) D Bracciali (Austria) O Marach	6	2	[11]
4	(Croatia) M Draganja (Croatia) M Pavić	3	6	[9]
