= 2015 Dubai Tennis Championships – Women's doubles =

Women's doubles
- 2015 Dubai Tennis Championships

Final
- Champions: (Hungary) Tímea Babos (France) Kristina Mladenovic
- Runners-up: (Spain) Garbiñe Muguruza (Spain) Carla Suárez Navarro
- Score: 6–3, 6–2

Events
Singles	men	women
Doubles	men	women
- Dubai Tennis Championships

Alla Kudryavtseva and Anastasia Rodionova were defending champions, but chose not to participate together. Rodionova partnered up with her sister Arina, but they lost in the quarterfinals to Garbiñe Muguruza and Carla Suárez Navarro. Kudryavtseva played alongside Anastasia Pavlyuchenkova, but they lost in the semifinals to Muguruza and Suárez Navarro.
Tímea Babos and Kristina Mladenovic won the title, defeating Muguruza and Suárez Navarro in the final, 6–3, 6–2.

== Seeds ==
The top four seeds received a bye into the second round.

1. (Chinese Taipei) Hsieh Su-wei / (India) Sania Mirza (second round)
2. (Russia) Ekaterina Makarova / (Russia) Elena Vesnina (quarterfinals)
3. (Switzerland) Martina Hingis (Italy) Flavia Pennetta (second round)
4. (China) Peng Shuai / (Czech Republic) Květa Peschke (second round)
5. (United States) Raquel Kops-Jones / (United States) Abigail Spears (first round)
6. (Spain) Garbiñe Muguruza / (Spain) Carla Suárez Navarro (final)
7. (France) Caroline Garcia / (Slovenia) Katarina Srebotnik (semifinals)
8. (Hungary) Tímea Babos / (France) Kristina Mladenovic (champions)

== Draw ==
Key

- Q = Qualifier
- WC = Wild card
- LL = Lucky loser
- Alt = Alternate
- ITF = ITF entry
- PR = Protected ranking
- SR = Special ranking
- SE = Special exempt
- JE = Junior exempt
- JR = Junior Accelerator Programme entrant
- CO = College Accelerator Programme entrant
- NG = Next Gen Accelerator Program entrant
- w/o = Walkover
- r = Retired
- d = Defaulted

=== Finals ===
Semifinals
(Russia) Alla Kudryavtseva (Russia) Anastasia Pavlyuchenkova	2	3
6	(Spain) Garbiñe Muguruza (Spain) Carla Suárez Navarro	6	6
8	(Hungary) Tímea Babos (France) Kristina Mladenovic	3	6	[10]
7	(France) Caroline Garcia (Slovenia) Katarina Srebotnik	6	1	[5]

Final
6	(Spain) Garbiñe Muguruza (Spain) Carla Suárez Navarro	3	2
8	(Hungary) Tímea Babos (France) Kristina Mladenovic	6	6

=== Top half ===
First round
(Canada) G Dabrowski (Poland) A Rosolska	4	5
(Russia) A Kudryavtseva (Russia) A Pavlyuchenkova	6	7
(Australia) C Dellacqua (Australia) S Stosur	6	6
(Australia) J Gajdošová (Germany) S Lisicki	3	4
(Germany) J Görges (Germany) A-L Grönefeld	7^{7}	6
5	(United States) R Kops-Jones (United States) A Spears	6^{1}	2
(Poland) K Jans-Ignacik (Slovenia) A Klepač	2	1
(Australia) An Rodionova (Australia) Ar Rodionova	6	6
(Serbia) J Janković (Spain) A Parra Santonja	6	6
Alt	(Bulgaria) A Naydenova (Russia) E Rodina	3	2
(Czech Republic) R Voráčová (China) Y Xu	2	4
6	(Spain) G Muguruza (Spain) C Suárez Navarro	6	6

Second round
1	(Chinese Taipei) S-w Hsieh (India) S Mirza	4	6	[7]
(Russia) A Kudryavtseva (Russia) A Pavlyuchenkova	6	4	[10]
(Australia) C Dellacqua (Australia) S Stosur	4	2
(Germany) J Görges (Germany) A-L Grönefeld	6	6
3	(Switzerland) M Hingis (Italy) F Pennetta	3	6^{2}
(Australia) An Rodionova (Australia) Ar Rodionova	6	7^{7}
(Serbia) J Janković (Spain) A Parra Santonja	4	4
6	(Spain) G Muguruza (Spain) C Suárez Navarro	6	6

Quarterfinals
(Russia) A Kudryavtseva (Russia) A Pavlyuchenkova	7	7^{7}
(Germany) J Görges (Germany) A-L Grönefeld	5	6^{1}
(Australia) An Rodionova (Australia) Ar Rodionova	5	4
6	(Spain) G Muguruza (Spain) C Suárez Navarro	7	6

Semifinals
(Russia) A Kudryavtseva (Russia) A Pavlyuchenkova	2	3
6	(Spain) G Muguruza (Spain) C Suárez Navarro	6	6

=== Bottom half ===
First round
8	(Hungary) T Babos (France) K Mladenovic	7^{7}	6
(Croatia) D Jurak (Georgia (country)) O Kalashnikova	6^{2}	2
(Ukraine) Y Beygelzimer (Ukraine) K Kozlova	2	7	[6]
WC	(Oman) F Al-Nabhani (Germany) M Barthel	6	5	[10]
(Netherlands) M Krajicek (Czech Republic) B Záhlavová-Strýcová	6	3	[7]
(Romania) M Niculescu (Russia) A Panova	4	6	[10]
7	(France) C Garcia (Slovenia) K Srebotnik	7^{7}	1	[10]
(Czech Republic) Ka Plíšková (Czech Republic) L Šafářová	6^{4}	6	[3]
(Chinese Taipei) H-c Chan (Chinese Taipei) Y-j Chan	4	6	[11]
(New Zealand) M Erakovic (United Kingdom) H Watson	6	2	[13]
(Czech Republic) K Koukalová (Czech Republic) K Siniaková	6^{4}	6	[10]
(Luxembourg) M Minella (Germany) A Petkovic	7^{7}	2	[4]

Second round
8	(Hungary) T Babos (France) K Mladenovic	6	6
WC	(Oman) F Al-Nabhani (Germany) M Barthel	1	2
(Romania) M Niculescu (Russia) A Panova	7^{10}	7^{9}
4	(China) S Peng (Czech Republic) K Peschke	6^{8}	6^{7}
7	(France) C Garcia (Slovenia) K Srebotnik	6	6
(New Zealand) M Erakovic (United Kingdom) H Watson	3	4
(Czech Republic) K Koukalová (Czech Republic) K Siniaková	6^{0}	4
2	(Russia) E Makarova (Russia) E Vesnina	7^{7}	6

Quarterfinals
8	(Hungary) T Babos (France) K Mladenovic	7^{8}	6
(Romania) M Niculescu (Russia) A Panova	6^{6}	4
7	(France) C Garcia (Slovenia) K Srebotnik	7	6
2	(Russia) E Makarova (Russia) E Vesnina	5	2

Semifinals
8	(Hungary) T Babos (France) K Mladenovic	3	6	[10]
7	(France) C Garcia (Slovenia) K Srebotnik	6	1	[5]
