= 2013 AON Open Challenger – Singles =

Singles
- 2013 AON Open Challenger

Final
- Champion: (Germany) Dustin Brown
- Runner-up: (Italy) Filippo Volandri
- Score: 7–6^{(7–5)}, 6–3

Events
Singles	Doubles
← 2012 ·	AON Open Challenger	· 2014 →

Albert Montañés is the defending champion but lost in the first round to Gianluca Naso.
Dustin Brown defeated Filippo Volandri 7–6^{(7–5)}, 6–3

== Seeds ==
1. (Spain) Albert Montañés (first round)
2. (Spain) Albert Ramos (first round)
3. (Spain) Pablo Carreño Busta (quarterfinals)
4. (Italy) Paolo Lorenzi (semifinals)
5. (Russia) Andrey Kuznetsov (first round)
6. (Italy) Filippo Volandri (final)
7. (Czech Republic) Jan Hájek (quarterfinals)
8. (Russia) Teymuraz Gabashvili (second round, retired)

== Draw ==
=== Key ===
- Q = Qualifier
- WC = Wild card
- LL = Lucky loser
- Alt = Alternate
- SE = Special exempt
- PR = Protected ranking
- ITF = ITF entry
- JE = Junior exempt
- w/o = Walkover
- r = Retired
- d = Defaulted
- SR = Special ranking

=== Finals ===
Semifinals
(Germany) Dustin Brown	7^{10}	6
4	(Italy) Paolo Lorenzi	6^{8}	2
6	(Italy) Filippo Volandri	6	6
(Slovakia) Andrej Martin	2	1

Final
(Germany) Dustin Brown	7^{7}	6
6	(Italy) Filippo Volandri	6^{5}	3

=== Top half ===
First round
1/WC	(Spain) A Montañés	4	7	4
(Italy) G Naso	6	5	6
(Italy) A Arnaboldi	5	7^{7}	6
(Czech Republic) J Mertl	7	6^{4}	4
(Germany) D Brown	6	6
(Argentina) M Trungelliti	3	0
WC	(Italy) G Mager	6^{13}	3
8	(Russia) T Gabashvili	7^{15}	6
4	(Italy) P Lorenzi	6	3r
(Argentina) R Olivo	2	0
(Argentina) DS Schwartzman	7^{7}	6
(Spain) G Olaso	6^{4}	3
Q	(Italy) Enrico Burzi	3	5
(Austria) D Thiem	6	7
(France) M Teixeira	4	6	3
7	(Czech Republic) J Hájek	6	3	6

Second round
(Italy) G Naso	3	4
(Italy) A Arnaboldi	6	6
(Germany) D Brown	7	4
8	(Russia) T Gabashvili	5	0^{r}
4	(Italy) P Lorenzi	1	6	6
(Argentina) DS Schwartzman	6	1	3
(Austria) D Thiem	4	4
7	(Czech Republic) J Hájek	6	6

Quarterfinals
(Italy) A Arnaboldi	6^{3}	7	1
(Germany) D Brown	7	6^{4}	6
4	(Italy) P Lorenzi	6	6
7	(Czech Republic) J Hájek	2	0

Semifinals
(Germany) D Brown	7^{10}	6
4	(Italy) P Lorenzi	6^{8}	2

=== Bottom half ===
First round
6	(Italy) F Volandri	3	6	7
Q	(Slovenia) J Semrajc	6	1	5
WC	(Italy) Francesco Picco	1	2
(Italy) M Cecchinato	6	6
(Italy) P Starace	6	6
Alt	(Croatia) K Mesaroš	4	2
(Italy) A Giannessi	6^{8}	2
3	(Spain) P Carreño Busta	7^{10}	6
5/WC	(Russia) A Kuznetsov	6^{5}	6	2
(Slovakia) A Martin	7^{7}	4	6
Q	(Spain) C Gómez-Herrera	6	2	6^{5}
(Israel) A Weintraub	2	6	7^{7}
(Italy) A di Mauro	6	6
(Serbia) B Pašanski	2	3
Q	(Germany) Moritz Baumann	6	1	6
2	(Spain) A Ramos	1	6	3

Second round
6	(Italy) F Volandri	6	6
(Italy) M Cecchinato	2	4
(Italy) P Starace	6^{2}	1
3	(Spain) P Carreño Busta	7^{7}	6
(Slovakia) A Martin	6	6
(Israel) A Weintraub	4	3
(Italy) A di Mauro	4	6	6
Q	(Germany) M Baumann	6	0	4

Quarterfinals
6	(Italy) F Volandri	6	7
3	(Spain) P Carreño Busta	3	5
(Slovakia) A Martin	6	6
(Italy) A di Mauro	1	0

Semifinals
6	(Italy) F Volandri	6	6
(Slovakia) A Martin	2	1
