= 2013 AON Open Challenger =

- Date: 2 – 8 September
- Edition: 10th
- Surface: Clay
- Location: Genoa, Italy

Champions

Singles
- (Germany) Dustin Brown

Doubles
- (Italy) Daniele Bracciali / (Austria) Oliver Marach
← 2012 ·	AON Open Challenger	· 2014 →

The 2013 AON Open Challenger was a professional tennis tournament played on clay courts. It was the tenth edition of the tournament which was part of the 2013 ATP Challenger Tour. It took place in Genoa, Italy between 2 and 8 September 2013.

== Singles main draw entrants ==
=== Seeds ===
Country	Player	Rank^{1}	Seed
ESP	Albert Montañés	44	1
ESP	Albert Ramos	75	2
ESP	Pablo Carreño Busta	76	3
ITA	Paolo Lorenzi	80	4
RUS	Andrey Kuznetsov	83	5
ITA	Filippo Volandri	101	6
CZE	Jan Hájek	103	7
RUS	Teymuraz Gabashvili	122	8

- ^{1} Rankings are as of August 26, 2013.

=== Other entrants ===
The following players received wildcards into the singles main draw:

- (Italy) Gianluca Mager
- (Russia) Andrey Kuznetsov
- (Spain) Albert Montañés
- (Italy) Francesco Picco

The following players received entry into the singles main draw as an alternate:

- (Croatia) Kristijan Mesaroš

The following players received entry from the qualifying draw:

- (Italy) Enrico Burzi
- (Slovenia) Janez Semrajc
- (Spain) Carlos Gómez-Herrera
- (Germany) Moritz Baumann

== Champions ==
=== Singles ===
- (Germany) Dustin Brown def. (Italy) Filippo Volandri 7–6^{(7–5)}, 6–3

=== Doubles ===
- (Italy) Daniele Bracciali / (Austria) Oliver Marach def. (Croatia) Marin Draganja / (Croatia) Mate Pavić 6–3, 2–6, [11–9]
