= 2015 Dubai Tennis Championships – Women's singles =

Women's singles
- 2015 Dubai Tennis Championships

Final
- Champion: (Romania) Simona Halep
- Runner-up: (Czech Republic) Karolína Plíšková
- Score: 6–4, 7–6^{(7–4)}

Details
- Draw: 54
- Seeds: 16

Events
Singles	men	women
Doubles	men	women
- Dubai Tennis Championships

Simona Halep defeated Karolína Plíšková in the final, 6–4, 7–6^{(7–4)} to win the women's singles tennis title at the 2015 Dubai Tennis Championships.

Venus Williams was the defending champion, but lost in the third round to Lucie Šafářová.

== Seeds ==
The top eight seeds received a bye into the second round.

1. (Romania) Simona Halep (champion)
2. (Czech Republic) Petra Kvitová (third round)
3. (Denmark) Caroline Wozniacki (semifinals)
4. (Serbia) Ana Ivanovic (third round)
5. (Poland) Agnieszka Radwańska (third round)
6. (Russia) Ekaterina Makarova (quarterfinals)
7. (Germany) Angelique Kerber (third round)
8. (United States) Venus Williams (third round)
9. (Germany) Andrea Petkovic (second round)
10. (Italy) Flavia Pennetta (quarterfinals)
11. (Czech Republic) Lucie Šafářová (quarterfinals)
12. (Serbia) Jelena Janković (second round)
13. (Spain) Carla Suárez Navarro (quarterfinals)
14. (Slovakia) Dominika Cibulková (withdrew because of Achilles injury)
15. (France) Alizé Cornet (third round)
16. (China) Peng Shuai (second round)
17. (Czech Republic) Karolína Plíšková (final)

Click on the seed number of a player to go to their draw section.

The two Antwerp finalists also received a bye into the second round. They were as follows:

- (Germany) Andrea Petkovic
- (Spain) Carla Suárez Navarro

== Draw ==
Key

- Q = Qualifier
- WC = Wild card
- LL = Lucky loser
- Alt = Alternate
- ITF = ITF entry
- PR = Protected ranking
- SR = Special ranking
- SE = Special exempt
- JE = Junior exempt
- JR = Junior Accelerator Programme entrant
- CO = College Accelerator Programme entrant
- NG = Next Gen Accelerator Program entrant
- w/o = Walkover
- r = Retired
- d = Defaulted

=== Finals ===
Quarterfinals
1	(Romania) Simona Halep	6	1	7
6	(Russia) Ekaterina Makarova	3	6	5
3	(Denmark) Caroline Wozniacki	7	6
10/WC	(Italy) Flavia Pennetta	5	0
11	(Czech Republic) Lucie Šafářová	6	6^{5}	1
17	(Czech Republic) Karolína Plíšková	3	7^{7}	6
(Spain) Garbiñe Muguruza	6^{4}	6	6
13	(Spain) Carla Suárez Navarro	7^{7}	3	3

Semifinals
1	(Romania) Simona Halep	2	6	6
3	(Denmark) Caroline Wozniacki	6	1	1
17	(Czech Republic) Karolína Plíšková	6	5	7
(Spain) Garbiñe Muguruza	4	7	5

Final
1	(Romania) Simona Halep	6	7^{7}
17	(Czech Republic) Karolína Plíšková	4	6^{4}

=== Top half ===
==== Section 1 ====
First round
(Germany) M Barthel	6^{5}	6	3
WC	(Slovakia) D Hantuchová	7^{7}	3	6
(Bulgaria) T Pironkova	6	4	6
(Czech Republic) K Koukalová	3	6	3
LL	(Russia) E Vesnina	5	1
16	(China) S Peng	7	6
(Kazakhstan) Z Diyas	6	6
(Germany) A Beck	2	2
(United Kingdom) H Watson	4	5
Q	(Ukraine) K Kozlova	6	7

Second round
1	(Romania) S Halep	6	6
WC	(Slovakia) D Hantuchová	2	0
(Bulgaria) T Pironkova	3	6	7^{7}
16	(China) S Peng	6	4	6^{5}
9	(Germany) A Petkovic	5	3
(Kazakhstan) Z Diyas	7	6
Q	(Ukraine) K Kozlova	3	3
6	(Russia) E Makarova	6	6

Third round
1	(Romania) S Halep	6	6
(Bulgaria) T Pironkova	4	3
(Kazakhstan) Z Diyas	3	4
6	(Russia) E Makarova	6	6

Quarterfinals
1	(Romania) S Halep	6	1	7
6	(Russia) E Makarova	3	6	5

==== Section 2 ====
First round
Q	(Croatia) M Lučić-Baroni	3	1
(Australia) S Stosur	6	6
Q	(Canada) G Dabrowski	2	7^{9}	4
WC	(Turkey) Ç Büyükakçay	6	6^{7}	6
(Belgium) K Flipkens	0	7^{8}	3
15	(France) A Cornet	6	6^{6}	6
10/WC	(Italy) F Pennetta	2	7^{7}	6
LL	(Germany) J Görges	6	6^{3}	4
Q	(China) Q Wang	5	6	7
(Japan) K Nara	7	1	5
(Estonia) K Kanepi	1^{r}
(Russia) S Kuznetsova	4

Second round
3	(Denmark) C Wozniacki	4	6	7
(Australia) S Stosur	6	1	5
WC	(Turkey) Ç Büyükakçay	2	4
15	(France) A Cornet	6	6
10/WC	(Italy) F Pennetta	6	7
Q	(China) Q Wang	3	5
(Russia) S Kuznetsova	6^{9}	4
7	(Germany) A Kerber	7^{11}	6

Third round
3	(Denmark) C Wozniacki	6	6
15	(France) A Cornet	4	0
10/WC	(Italy) F Pennetta	6	3	6
7	(Germany) A Kerber	2	6	1

Quarterfinals
3	(Denmark) C Wozniacki	7	6
10/WC	(Italy) F Pennetta	5	0

=== Bottom half ===
==== Section 3 ====
First round
(Switzerland) B Bencic	6	6
(Italy) K Knapp	4	4
LL	(Czech Republic) K Siniaková	3	4
WC	(Australia) C Dellacqua	6	6
(Puerto Rico) M Puig	1	4
11	(Czech Republic) L Šafářová	6	6
17	(Czech Republic) Ka Plíšková	6	6
(Russia) A Pavlyuchenkova	2	4
(Czech Republic) B Záhlavová-Strýcová	6	6
Q	(Ukraine) Y Beygelzimer	4	2
(Germany) S Lisicki	6	6
(Romania) M Niculescu	3	4

Second round
8	(United States) V Williams	6	6
(Switzerland) B Bencic	1	2
WC	(Australia) C Dellacqua	7^{8}	6^{4}	5
11	(Czech Republic) L Šafářová	6^{6}	7^{7}	7
17	(Czech Republic) Ka Plíšková	6	6
(Czech Republic) B Záhlavová-Strýcová	4	2
(Germany) S Lisicki	0	3
4	(Serbia) A Ivanovic	6	6

Third round
8	(United States) V Williams	4	2
11	(Czech Republic) L Šafářová	6	6
17	(Czech Republic) Ka Plíšková	6	4	6
4	(Serbia) A Ivanovic	2	6	4

Quarterfinals
11	(Czech Republic) L Šafářová	6	6^{5}	1
17	(Czech Republic) Ka Plíšková	3	7^{7}	6

==== Section 4 ====
First round
(France) C Garcia	6	6
Q	(Australia) Ar Rodionova	3	2
Q	(Australia) J Gajdošová	6	1	2
(Spain) G Muguruza	3	6	6
Q	(Hungary) T Babos	3	6	1
12	(Serbia) J Janković	6	4	6
PR	(Russia) V Zvonareva	4	2
(Italy) C Giorgi	6	6
(United States) C Vandeweghe	1^{r}
(Ukraine) E Svitolina	3

Second round
5	(Poland) A Radwańska	6	2	6
(France) C Garcia	3	6	3
(Spain) G Muguruza	6	6
12	(Serbia) J Janković	3	1
13	(Spain) C Suárez Navarro	6	6
(Italy) C Giorgi	3	4
(Ukraine) E Svitolina	6	3	2
2	(Czech Republic) P Kvitová	2	6	6

Third round
5	(Poland) A Radwańska	4	2
(Spain) G Muguruza	6	6
13	(Spain) C Suárez Navarro	6	4	6
2	(Czech Republic) P Kvitová	3	6	3

Quarterfinals
(Spain) G Muguruza	6^{4}	6	6
13	(Spain) C Suárez Navarro	7^{7}	3	3

== Qualifying ==
=== Seeds ===
1. (Australia) Jarmila Gajdošová (qualified)
2. (Croatia) Mirjana Lučić-Baroni (qualified)
3. (Czech Republic) Tereza Smitková (first round, retired)
4. (China) Zhang Shuai (first round, retired)
5. (Germany) Julia Görges (qualifying competition, lucky loser)
6. (Russia) Elena Vesnina (qualifying competition, lucky loser)
7. (Czech Republic) Kateřina Siniaková (qualifying competition, lucky loser)
8. (China) Zheng Saisai (withdrew)
9. (New Zealand) Marina Erakovic (withdrew, still playing in Pattaya)
10. (Hungary) Tímea Babos (qualified)
11. (Switzerland) Stefanie Vögele (first round)
12. (Romania) Alexandra Dulgheru (qualifying competition)
13. (China) Wang Qiang (qualified)
14. (Croatia) Ana Konjuh (first round)
15. (Japan) Misaki Doi (withdrew)
16. (Russia) Alla Kudryavtseva (first round)
17. (Russia) Evgeniya Rodina (qualifying competition)

=== Qualifiers ===
1. (Australia) Jarmila Gajdošová
2. (Croatia) Mirjana Lučić-Baroni
3. (Australia) Arina Rodionova
4. (Ukraine) Yuliya Beygelzimer
5. (Canada) Gabriela Dabrowski
6. (Ukraine) Kateryna Kozlova
7. (Hungary) Tímea Babos
8. (China) Wang Qiang

=== Lucky losers ===
1. (Germany) Julia Görges
2. (Russia) Elena Vesnina
3. (Czech Republic) Kateřina Siniaková

=== Draw ===
==== First qualifier ====
First round
1	(Australia) Jarmila Gajdošová	6	4	6
(Israel) Shahar Pe'er	2	6	3
(Japan) Misa Eguchi	4	6	6
11	(Switzerland) Stefanie Vögele	6	1	4

Qualifying competition
1	(Australia) Jarmila Gajdošová	6	6
(Japan) Misa Eguchi	2	2

==== Second qualifier ====
First round
2	(Croatia) Mirjana Lučić-Baroni	6	6
Alt	(United States) Raquel Kops-Jones	2	4
(Kazakhstan) Yulia Putintseva	6	5	3
12	(Romania) Alexandra Dulgheru	4	7	6

Qualifying competition
2	(Croatia) Mirjana Lučić-Baroni	5	6	6
12	(Romania) Alexandra Dulgheru	7	2	2

==== Third qualifier ====
First round
3	(Czech Republic) Tereza Smitková	6	1	2^{r}
WC	(Australia) Arina Rodionova	4	6	4
WC	(Australia) Anastasia Rodionova	6	6
Alt	(Poland) Alicja Rosolska	1	1

Qualifying competition
WC	(Australia) Arina Rodionova	6	0
WC	(Australia) Anastasia Rodionova	2	1^{r}

==== Fourth qualifier ====
First round
4	(China) Zhang Shuai	3	4^{r}
(Ukraine) Yuliya Beygelzimer	6	3
WC	(Bulgaria) Aleksandrina Naydenova	w/o
15	(Japan) Misaki Doi

Qualifying competition
(Ukraine) Yuliya Beygelzimer	7	6
WC	(Bulgaria) Aleksandrina Naydenova	5	1

==== Fifth qualifier ====
First round
5	(Germany) Julia Görges	3	6	6
(Luxembourg) Mandy Minella	6	4	3
(Canada) Gabriela Dabrowski	6	6
16	(Russia) Alla Kudryavtseva	4	2

Qualifying competition
5	(Germany) Julia Görges	4	6	3
(Canada) Gabriela Dabrowski	6	3	6

==== Sixth qualifier ====
First round
6	(Russia) Elena Vesnina	7^{7}	6
Alt	(United States) Abigail Spears	6^{3}	3
(Ukraine) Kateryna Kozlova	6	6
14	(Croatia) Ana Konjuh	4	3

Qualifying competition
6	(Russia) Elena Vesnina	6^{5}	4
(Ukraine) Kateryna Kozlova	7^{7}	6

==== Seventh qualifier ====
First round
7	(Czech Republic) Kateřina Siniaková	6	4	6
(Russia) Ekaterina Bychkova	0	6	1
(Russia) Alexandra Panova	4	4
10	(Hungary) Tímea Babos	6	6

Qualifying competition
7	(Czech Republic) Kateřina Siniaková	1	6	1
10	(Hungary) Tímea Babos	6	4	6

==== Eighth qualifier ====
First round
17	(Russia) Evgeniya Rodina	6	6
WC	(Oman) Fatma Al-Nabhani	3	1
(Slovakia) Kristína Kučová	2	6	2
13	(China) Wang Qiang	6	4	6

Qualifying competition
17	(Russia) Evgeniya Rodina	1	6	2
13	(China) Wang Qiang	6	4	6
