= 2015 Dubai Tennis Championships – Men's singles =

Men's singles
- 2015 Dubai Tennis Championships

Final
- Champion: (Switzerland) Roger Federer
- Runner-up: (Serbia) Novak Djokovic
- Score: 6–3, 7–5

Details
- Draw: 32
- Seeds: 8

Events
Singles	men	women
Doubles	men	women
- Dubai Tennis Championships

Defending champion Roger Federer defeated Novak Djokovic in the final, 6–3, 7–5 to win the men's singles tennis title at the 2015 Dubai Tennis Championships. He did not lose a single set in the entire tournament. It was Federer's seventh Dubai title and 84th career title.

== Seeds ==
1. (Serbia) Novak Djokovic (final)
2. (Switzerland) Roger Federer (champion)
3. (United Kingdom) Andy Murray (quarterfinals)
4. (Czech Republic) Tomáš Berdych (semifinals)
5. (Latvia) Ernests Gulbis (first round)
6. (Spain) Feliciano López (second round)
7. (Spain) Roberto Bautista Agut (second round)
8. (Belgium) David Goffin (first round)

== Draw ==
Key

- Q = Qualifier
- WC = Wild card
- LL = Lucky loser
- Alt = Alternate
- ITF = ITF entry
- PR = Protected ranking
- SR = Special ranking
- SE = Special exempt
- JE = Junior exempt
- JR = Junior Accelerator Programme entrant
- CO = College Accelerator Programme entrant
- NG = Next Gen Accelerator Program entrant
- w/o = Walkover
- r = Retired
- d = Defaulted

=== Finals ===
Semifinals
1	(Serbia) Novak Djokovic	6	5	6
4	(Czech Republic) Tomáš Berdych	0	7	4
LL	(Croatia) Borna Ćorić	2	1
2	(Switzerland) Roger Federer	6	6

Final
1	(Serbia) Novak Djokovic	3	5
2	(Switzerland) Roger Federer	6	7

=== Top half ===
First round
1	(Serbia) N Djokovic	6	6
(Canada) V Pospisil	4	4
(Kazakhstan) A Golubev	7	6
Q	(France) F Martin	5	4
Q	(Turkey) M İlhan	6	7^{7}
WC	(Germany) A Zverev	1	6^{4}
Q	(United Kingdom) J Ward	4	4
6	(Spain) F López	6	6
4	(Czech Republic) T Berdych	7^{7}	6
(France) J Chardy	6^{2}	4
(Italy) S Bolelli	6	6
Q	(France) L Pouille	3	3
(Ukraine) S Stakhovsky	4	6	6
(Czech Republic) L Rosol	6	1	4
(Uzbekistan) D Istomin	7	6
5	(Latvia) E Gulbis	5	2

Second round
1	(Serbia) N Djokovic	6	6
(Kazakhstan) A Golubev	1	2
Q	(Turkey) M İlhan	3	7	6
6	(Spain) F López	6	5	3
4	(Czech Republic) T Berdych	7^{9}	5	6
(Italy) S Bolelli	6^{7}	7	0
(Ukraine) S Stakhovsky	6	3	6
(Uzbekistan) D Istomin	4	6	4

Quarterfinals
1	(Serbia) N Djokovic	6	6
Q	(Turkey) M İlhan	1	1
4	(Czech Republic) T Berdych	6	4	6
(Ukraine) S Stakhovsky	3	6	2

Semifinals
1	(Serbia) N Djokovic	6	5	6
4	(Czech Republic) T Berdych	0	7	4

=== Bottom half ===
First round
8	(Belgium) D Goffin	2	5
WC	(Cyprus) M Baghdatis	6	7
LL	(Croatia) B Ćorić	5	6	6
(Tunisia) M Jaziri	7	3	3
WC	(Republic of Ireland) J McGee	1	2
(Portugal) J Sousa	6	6
(Luxembourg) G Müller	4	5
3	(United Kingdom) A Murray	6	7
7	(Spain) R Bautista Agut	6	6
(Austria) D Thiem	3	2
(Italy) A Seppi	4	7^{7}	4
(France) R Gasquet	6	6^{1}	6
(Spain) F Verdasco	7	6
(Spain) G García-López	5	1
(Russia) M Youzhny	3	1
2	(Switzerland) R Federer	6	6

Second round
WC	(Cyprus) M Baghdatis	4	6	6^{4r}
LL	(Croatia) B Ćorić	6	3	6^{4}
(Portugal) J Sousa	0	2
3	(United Kingdom) A Murray	6	6
7	(Spain) R Bautista Agut	4	6	6^{6}
(France) R Gasquet	6	3	7^{8}
(Spain) F Verdasco	4	3
2	(Switzerland) R Federer	6	6

Quarterfinals
LL	(Croatia) B Ćorić	6	6
3	(United Kingdom) A Murray	1	3
(France) R Gasquet	1	0^{r}
2	(Switzerland) R Federer	6	0

Semifinals
LL	(Croatia) B Ćorić	2	1
2	(Switzerland) R Federer	6	6

== Qualifying ==
=== Seeds ===
1. (Austria) Jürgen Melzer (first round)
2. (Croatia) Borna Ćorić (qualifying competition, Lucky loser)
3. (Turkey) Marsel İlhan (qualified)
4. (United Kingdom) James Ward (qualified)
5. (France) Lucas Pouille (qualified)
6. (France) Édouard Roger-Vasselin (first round)
7. (Russia) Evgeny Donskoy (first round)
8. (Georgia (country)) Nikoloz Basilashvili (first round)

=== Qualifiers ===
1. (France) Lucas Pouille
2. (France) Fabrice Martin
3. (Turkey) Marsel İlhan
4. (United Kingdom) James Ward

=== Lucky losers ===
1. (Croatia) Borna Ćorić

=== Qualifying draw ===
==== First qualifier ====
First round
1	(Austria) Jürgen Melzer	6	4	4
(Serbia) Laslo Djere	2	6	6
WC	(United Arab Emirates) Omar Alawadhi	3	3
5	(France) Lucas Pouille	6	6

Qualifying competition
(Serbia) Laslo Djere	7^{7}	3	2
5	(France) Lucas Pouille	6^{3}	6	6

==== Second qualifier ====
First round
2	(Croatia) Borna Ćorić	6	6
(Spain) Daniel Muñoz de la Nava	3	4
(France) Fabrice Martin	6	6
7	(Russia) Evgeny Donskoy	3	2

Qualifying competition
2	(Croatia) Borna Ćorić	3	7^{7}	6^{5}
(France) Fabrice Martin	6	6^{5}	7^{7}

==== Third qualifier ====
First round
3	(Turkey) Marsel İlhan	6	6
WC	(Switzerland) Michael Lammer	4	2
(Czech Republic) Jan Hernych	6	3	6
6	(France) Édouard Roger-Vasselin	4	6	4

Qualifying competition
3	(Turkey) Marsel İlhan	6	6
(Czech Republic) Jan Hernych	4	4

==== Fourth qualifier ====
First round
4	(United Kingdom) James Ward	6	6
WC	(United Arab Emirates) Hamad Abbas Janahi	0	0
(Romania) Marius Copil	6	7^{7}
8	(Georgia (country)) Nikoloz Basilashvili	3	6^{1}

Qualifying competition
4	(United Kingdom) James Ward	6^{3}	6	6
(Romania) Marius Copil	7^{7}	4	4
