= 2014 Città di Vercelli – Trofeo Multimed =

- Date: 21–27 April
- Edition: 1st
- Draw: 32S / 16D
- Prize money: €42,500
- Surface: Clay
- Location: Vercelli, Italy

Champions

Singles
- (Italy) Simone Bolelli

Doubles
- (Italy) Matteo Donati / (Italy) Stefano Napolitano
- Città di Vercelli – Trofeo Multimed

The 2014 Città di Vercelli – Trofeo Multimed was a professional tennis tournament played on clay courts. It was the first edition of the tournament which was part of the 2014 ATP Challenger Tour. It took place in Vercelli, Italy between 21 and 27 April 2014.

== Singles main-draw entrants ==
=== Seeds ===
Country	Player	Rank	Seed
GER	Dustin Brown	87	1
GER	Jan-Lennard Struff	96	2
BEL	David Goffin	105	3
SVN	Aljaž Bedene	111	4
CZE	Jan Hájek	127	5
FRA	Pierre-Hugues Herbert	134	6
SVK	Andrej Martin	139	7
ITA	Potito Starace	143	8

=== Other entrants ===
The following players received wildcards into the singles main draw:

- (Italy) Matteo Donati
- (Italy) Stefano Napolitano
- (Italy) Stefano Travaglia
- (Italy) Simone Bolelli

The following players received entry from the qualifying draw:

- (Italy) Federico Gaio
- (Austria) Nicolas Reissig
- (Croatia) Mate Delić
- (United Kingdom) Kyle Edmund

== Doubles main-draw entrants ==
=== Seeds ===
Country	Player	Country	Player	Rank	Seed
POL	Mateusz Kowalczyk	IND	Purav Raja	180	1
GER	Dustin Brown	GER	Alexander Satschko	202	2
ITA	Alessandro Motti	ITA	Potito Starace	270	3
ITA	Riccardo Ghedin	ITA	Claudio Grassi	276	4

=== Other entrants ===
The following pairs received wildcards into the doubles main draw:

- (Italy) Alberto Bagarello / (Italy) Alberto Giraudo
- (Italy) Pietro Rondoni / (Italy) Stefano Travaglia
- (Italy) Matteo Donati / (Italy) Stefano Napolitano

== Champions ==
=== Singles ===
- (Italy) Simone Bolelli def. (Croatia) Mate Delić, 6–2, 6–2

=== Doubles ===
- (Italy) Matteo Donati / (Italy) Stefano Napolitano def. (France) Pierre-Hugues Herbert / (France) Albano Olivetti, 7–6^{(7–2)}, 6–3
