= 2015 Dubai Tennis Championships – Men's doubles =

Men's doubles
- 2015 Dubai Tennis Championships

Final
- Champions: (India) Rohan Bopanna (Canada) Daniel Nestor
- Runners-up: (Pakistan) Aisam-ul-Haq Qureshi (Serbia) Nenad Zimonjić
- Score: 6–4, 6–1

Details
- Draw: 16
- Seeds: 4

Events
Singles	men	women
Doubles	men	women
- Dubai Tennis Championships

Rohan Bopanna and Aisam-ul-Haq Qureshi were the defending champions, but they chose not to participate together.
Bopanna successfully defended the title alongside Daniel Nestor, defeating Qureshi and Nenad Zimonjić in the final, 6–4, 6–1.

== Seeds ==
1. (United States) Bob Bryan / (United States) Mike Bryan (quarterfinals)
2. (Netherlands) Jean-Julien Rojer / (Romania) Horia Tecău (semifinals)
3. (Canada) Vasek Pospisil / (France) Édouard Roger-Vasselin (first round)
4. (India) Rohan Bopanna / (Canada) Daniel Nestor (champions)

== Draw ==
Key

- Q = Qualifier
- WC = Wild card
- LL = Lucky loser
- Alt = Alternate
- ITF = ITF entry
- PR = Protected ranking
- SR = Special ranking
- SE = Special exempt
- JE = Junior exempt
- JR = Junior Accelerator Programme entrant
- CO = College Accelerator Programme entrant
- NG = Next Gen Accelerator Program entrant
- w/o = Walkover
- r = Retired
- d = Defaulted

=== Draw ===
First round
1	(United States) B Bryan (United States) M Bryan	6	6
(Spain) R Bautista Agut (Portugal) J Sousa	2	2
(United Kingdom) D Inglot (Romania) F Mergea	7^{7}	7^{7}
(Spain) F López (Spain) F Verdasco	6^{3}	6^{5}
3	(Canada) V Pospisil (France) É Roger-Vasselin	2	3
(Pakistan) A-u-H Qureshi (Serbia) N Zimonjić	6	6
(Italy) S Bolelli (Italy) A Seppi	0	1
(France) J Chardy (Czech Republic) L Rosol	6	6
Q	(United Kingdom) J Murray (Australia) J Peers	2	6	[10]
(South Africa) R Klaasen (India) L Paes	6	4	[8]
WC	(Serbia) L Djere (Serbia) N Djokovic	2	5
4	(India) R Bopanna (Canada) D Nestor	6	7
(Sweden) R Lindstedt (Poland) M Matkowski	7^{13}	3	[10]
LL	(Kazakhstan) A Golubev (Uzbekistan) D Istomin	6^{11}	6	[6]
WC	(Switzerland) R Federer (Switzerland) M Lammer	4	6^{12}
2	(Netherlands) J-J Rojer (Romania) H Tecău	6	7^{14}

Quarterfinals
1	(United States) B Bryan (United States) M Bryan	6^{6}	6	[8]
(United Kingdom) D Inglot (Romania) F Mergea	7^{8}	2	[10]
(Pakistan) A-u-H Qureshi (Serbia) N Zimonjić	6	6
(France) J Chardy (Czech Republic) L Rosol	1	2
Q	(United Kingdom) J Murray (Australia) J Peers	4	5
4	(India) R Bopanna (Canada) D Nestor	6	7
(Sweden) R Lindstedt (Poland) M Matkowski	6	5	[7]
2	(Netherlands) J-J Rojer (Romania) H Tecău	4	7	[10]

Semifinals
(United Kingdom) D Inglot (Romania) F Mergea	7^{7}	4	[9]
(Pakistan) A-u-H Qureshi (Serbia) N Zimonjić	6^{2}	6	[11]
4	(India) R Bopanna (Canada) D Nestor	4	7^{11}	[11]
2	(Netherlands) J-J Rojer (Romania) H Tecău	6	6^{9}	[9]

Final
(Pakistan) A-u-H Qureshi (Serbia) N Zimonjić	4	1
4	(India) R Bopanna (Canada) D Nestor	6	6

== Qualifying ==
=== Seeds ===
1. (United Kingdom) Jamie Murray / (Australia) John Peers (qualified)
2. (France) Fabrice Martin / (India) Purav Raja (first round)

=== Qualifiers ===
1. (United Kingdom) Jamie Murray / (Australia) John Peers

=== Lucky losers ===
1. (Kazakhstan) Andrey Golubev / (Uzbekistan) Denis Istomin

=== Qualifying draw ===
First round
1	(United Kingdom) Jamie Murray (Australia) John Peers	6	7^{8}
WC	(India) Mahesh Bhupathi (Russia) Mikhail Youzhny	4	6^{6}
(Kazakhstan) Andrey Golubev (Uzbekistan) Denis Istomin	7^{7}	6
2	(France) Fabrice Martin (India) Purav Raja	6^{5}	4

Qualifying competition
1	(United Kingdom) Jamie Murray (Australia) John Peers	7^{7}	6
(Kazakhstan) Andrey Golubev (Uzbekistan) Denis Istomin	6^{5}	4
