= 2015 Dubai Tennis Championships =

- Date: 23–28 February (men); 15 – 21 February (women)
- Edition: 23rd (men) / 15th (women)
- Category: ATP World Tour 500 (men); WTA Premier 5 (women)
- Draw: 32S / 16D (men); 54S / 28D (women)
- Prize money: $2,503,810 (ATP) $2,513,000 (WTA)
- Surface: Hard, Outdoor
- Location: Dubai, United Arab Emirates
- Venue: Aviation Club Tennis Centre

Champions

Men's singles
- (Switzerland) Roger Federer

Women's singles
- (Romania) Simona Halep

Men's doubles
- (India) Rohan Bopanna / (Canada) Daniel Nestor

Women's doubles
- (Hungary) Tímea Babos / (France) Kristina Mladenovic
- Dubai Tennis Championships

The 2015 Dubai Tennis Championships (also known as the 2015 Dubai Duty Free Tennis Championships for sponsorship reasons) was an ATP 500 event on the 2015 ATP World Tour and a WTA Premier 5 on the 2015 WTA Tour. Both events were held at the Aviation Club Tennis Centre in Dubai, United Arab Emirates. The women's tournament took place from February 15 to 21, 2015, while the men's tournament took place from February 23 to 28, 2015.

== Finals ==
=== Men's singles ===
- (Switzerland) Roger Federer defeated (Serbia) Novak Djokovic, 6–3, 7–5

=== Women's singles ===
- (Romania) Simona Halep defeated (Czech Republic) Karolína Plíšková, 6–4, 7–6^{(7–4)}

=== Men's doubles ===
- (India) Rohan Bopanna / (Canada) Daniel Nestor defeated (Pakistan) Aisam-ul-Haq Qureshi / (Serbia) Nenad Zimonjić, 6–4, 6–1

=== Women's doubles ===
- (Hungary) Tímea Babos / (France) Kristina Mladenovic defeated (Spain) Garbiñe Muguruza / (Spain) Carla Suárez Navarro, 6–3, 6–2

== Points and prize money ==
=== Point distribution ===
Event	W	F	SF	QF	Round of 16	Round of 32	Round of 64	Q	Q2	Q1
Men's singles	500	300	180	90	45	0	—N/a	20	10	0
Men's doubles	500	300	180	90	45	—N/a	—N/a	20	0	0
Women's singles	900	585	350	190	105	60	1	30	20	1
Women's doubles	900	585	350	190	105	1	—N/a	—N/a	—N/a	—N/a

=== Prize money ===
Event	W	F	SF	QF	Round of 16	Round of 32	Round of 64	Q2	Q1
Men's singles	$505,000	$227,640	$107,830	$52,030	$26,530	$14,590	—N/a	$910	
Men's doubles	$149,170	$67,300	$31,730	$15,340	$7,870	—N/a	—N/a		
Women's singles	$456,000	$227,860	$113,850	$52,430	$26,000	$13,340	$7,474	$3,820	$1,965
Women's doubles	$130,300	$65,920	$32,740	$16,420	$8,290	$4,115	—N/a	—N/a	—N/a
Doubles prize money per team

== ATP singles main-draw entrants ==
=== Seeds ===
Country	Player	Rank^{1}	Seed
SRB	Novak Djokovic	1	1
SUI	Roger Federer	2	2
GBR	Andy Murray	4	3
CZE	Tomáš Berdych	8	4
LAT	Ernests Gulbis	13	5
ESP	Feliciano López	14	6
ESP	Roberto Bautista Agut	16	7
BEL	David Goffin	20	8

- Rankings are as of February 16, 2015.

==== Other entrants ====
The following players received wildcards into the singles main draw:

- (Cyprus) Marcos Baghdatis
- (Republic of Ireland) James McGee
- (Germany) Alexander Zverev

The following players received entry from the qualifying draw:

- (Turkey) Marsel İlhan
- (France) Fabrice Martin
- (France) Lucas Pouille
- (United Kingdom) James Ward

The following player received entry as a lucky loser:

- (Croatia) Borna Ćorić

==== Withdrawals ====
Before the tournament

- (Germany) Philipp Kohlschreiber (illness) → replaced by (Croatia) Borna Ćorić
- (Australia) Nick Kyrgios (back injury) → replaced by (Ukraine) Sergiy Stakhovsky

==== Retirements ====
- (Cyprus) Marcos Baghdatis (cramping)
- (France) Richard Gasquet (lower back pain)

== ATP doubles main-draw entrants ==
=== Seeds ===
Country	Player	Country	Player	Rank^{1}	Seed
USA	Bob Bryan	USA	Mike Bryan	2	1
NED	Jean-Julien Rojer	ROU	Horia Tecău	20	2
CAN	Vasek Pospisil	FRA	Édouard Roger-Vasselin	22	3
IND	Rohan Bopanna	CAN	Daniel Nestor	30	4

- Rankings are as of February 16, 2015.

==== Other entrants ====
The following pairs received wildcards into the doubles main draw:

- (Serbia) Laslo Djere / (Serbia) Novak Djokovic
- (Switzerland) Roger Federer / (Switzerland) Michael Lammer

The following pair received entry from the qualifying draw:

- (United Kingdom) Jamie Murray / (Australia) John Peers

The following pair received entry as lucky losers:

- (Kazakhstan) Andrey Golubev / (Uzbekistan) Denis Istomin

==== Withdrawals ====
Before the tournament

- (Germany) Philipp Kohlschreiber (illness)

== WTA singles main-draw entrants ==
=== Seeds ===
Country	Player	Rank^{1}	Seed
ROU	Simona Halep	3	1
CZE	Petra Kvitová	4	2
DEN	Caroline Wozniacki	5	3
SRB	Ana Ivanovic	6	4
POL	Agnieszka Radwańska	8	5
RUS	Ekaterina Makarova	9	6
GER	Angelique Kerber	10	7
USA	Venus Williams	11	8
GER	Andrea Petkovic	12	9
ITA	Flavia Pennetta	14	10
CZE	Lucie Šafářová	15	11
SRB	Jelena Janković	16	12
ESP	Carla Suárez Navarro	17	13
~~SVK~~	~~Dominika Cibulková~~	~~18~~	~~14~~
FRA	Alizé Cornet	19	15
CHN	Peng Shuai	21	16
CZE	Karolína Plíšková	22	17

- Rankings are as of February 9, 2015.

==== Other entrants ====
The following players received wildcards into the singles main draw:

- ~~(Canada) Eugenie Bouchard~~
- (Turkey) Çağla Büyükakçay
- (Australia) Casey Dellacqua
- (Slovakia) Daniela Hantuchová
- (Italy) Flavia Pennetta

The following player received entry using a protected ranking into the singles main draw:

- (Russia) Vera Zvonareva

The following players received entry from the qualifying draw:

- (Hungary) Tímea Babos
- (Ukraine) Yuliya Beygelzimer
- (Canada) Gabriela Dabrowski
- (Australia) Jarmila Gajdošová
- (Ukraine) Kateryna Kozlova
- (Croatia) Mirjana Lučić-Baroni
- (Australia) Arina Rodionova
- (China) Wang Qiang

The following players received entry as lucky losers:

- (Germany) Julia Görges
- (Czech Republic) Kateřina Siniaková
- (Russia) Elena Vesnina

==== Withdrawals ====
Before the tournament

- (Canada) Eugenie Bouchard (arm injury) → replaced by (Czech Republic) Kateřina Siniaková
- (Slovakia) Dominika Cibulková → replaced by (Russia) Elena Vesnina
- (United States) Varvara Lepchenko → replaced by (Puerto Rico) Monica Puig
- (United States) Serena Williams (illness) → replaced by (Germany) Julia Görges

==== Retirements ====
- (Estonia) Kaia Kanepi
- (United States) CoCo Vandeweghe

== WTA doubles main-draw entrants ==
=== Seeds ===
Country	Player	Country	Player	Rank^{1}	Seed
TPE	Hsieh Su-wei	IND	Sania Mirza	11	1
RUS	Ekaterina Makarova	RUS	Elena Vesnina	16	2
SUI	Martina Hingis	ITA	Flavia Pennetta	17	3
CHN	Peng Shuai	CZE	Květa Peschke	20	4
USA	Raquel Kops-Jones	USA	Abigail Spears	22	5
ESP	Garbiñe Muguruza	ESP	Carla Suárez Navarro	29	6
FRA	Caroline Garcia	SLO	Katarina Srebotnik	43	7
HUN	Tímea Babos	FRA	Kristina Mladenovic	44	8

- Rankings are as of February 9, 2015.

==== Other entrants ====
The following pair received a wildcard into the doubles main draw:

- (Oman) Fatma Al-Nabhani / (Germany) Mona Barthel

The following pair received entry as alternates:

- (Bulgaria) Aleksandrina Naydenova / (Russia) Evgeniya Rodina

==== Withdrawals ====
Before the tournament

- (Italy) Karin Knapp (illness)
