= 2015 Città di Vercelli – Trofeo Multimed =

- Date: 20–26 April
- Edition: 2nd
- Draw: 32S / 16D
- Prize money: €42,500
- Surface: Clay
- Location: Vercelli, Italy

Champions

Singles
- (Japan) Taro Daniel

Doubles
- (Italy) Andrea Arnaboldi / (Chile) Hans Podlipnik Castillo
- Città di Vercelli – Trofeo Multimed

The 2015 Città di Vercelli – Trofeo Multimed was a professional tennis tournament played on clay courts. It was the second edition of the tournament which was part of the 2015 ATP Challenger Tour. It took place in Vercelli, Italy between April 20 and 26.

== Singles main-draw entrants ==
=== Seeds ===
| Country | Player | Rank^{1} | Seed |
|---|---|---|---|
| SRB | ~~Filip Krajinović~~ | ~~92~~ | ~~1~~ |
| GER | Dustin Brown | 105 | 2 |
| NED | Igor Sijsling | 128 | 3 |
| GBR | Kyle Edmund | 129 | 4 |
| BEL | Kimmer Coppejans | 146 | 5 |
| ITA | Marco Cecchinato | 149 | 6 |
| CRO | Mate Delić | 162 | 7 |
| ITA | Andrea Arnaboldi | 177 | 8 |

- ^{1} Rankings are as of April 13, 2015

=== Other entrants ===
The following players received wildcards into the singles main draw:

- (Italy) Gianluca Mager
- (Italy) Stefano Napolitano
- (Italy) Salvatore Caruso
- (Italy) Gianluigi Quinzi

The following players received entry from the qualifying draw:

- (Monaco) Benjamin Balleret
- (France) Maxime Hamou
- (Croatia) Antonio Šančić
- (Switzerland) Yann Marti

The following player received entry as a lucky loser:

- (Italy) Omar Giacalone

== Champions ==
=== Singles ===
- (Japan) Taro Daniel def. (Italy) Filippo Volandri, 6–3, 1–6, 6–4

=== Doubles ===
- (Italy) Andrea Arnaboldi / (Chile) Hans Podlipnik Castillo def. (Belarus) Sergey Betov / (Russia) Michail Elgin, 6–7^{(5–7)}, 7–5, [10–3]
