= Città di Vercelli – Trofeo Multimed =

ATP Challenger Tour
- Location: Vercelli, Italy
- Category: ATP Challenger Tour
- Surface: Red clay
- Draw: 32S/32Q/16D
- Prize money: €42,500
- Website: Website

The Città di Vercelli – Trofeo Multimed was a tennis tournament held in Vercelli, Italy in 2014 and 2015. The event was part of the ATP Challenger Tour and was played on outdoor clay courts.

== Past finals ==
=== Singles ===
Year	Champion	Runner-up	Score	Ref.
2015	(Japan) Taro Daniel	(Italy) Filippo Volandri	6–3, 1–6, 6–4	
2014	(Italy) Simone Bolelli	(Croatia) Mate Delić	6–2, 6–2	

=== Doubles ===
Year	Champion	Runner-up	Score
2015	(Italy) Andrea Arnaboldi (Chile) Hans Podlipnik Castillo	(Belarus) Sergey Betov (Russia) Michail Elgin	6–7^{(5–7)}, 7–5, [10–3]
2014	(Italy) Matteo Donati (Italy) Stefano Napolitano	(France) Pierre-Hugues Herbert (France) Albano Olivetti	7–6^{(7–2)}, 6–3
