= Mate Delić =

Croatian tennis player

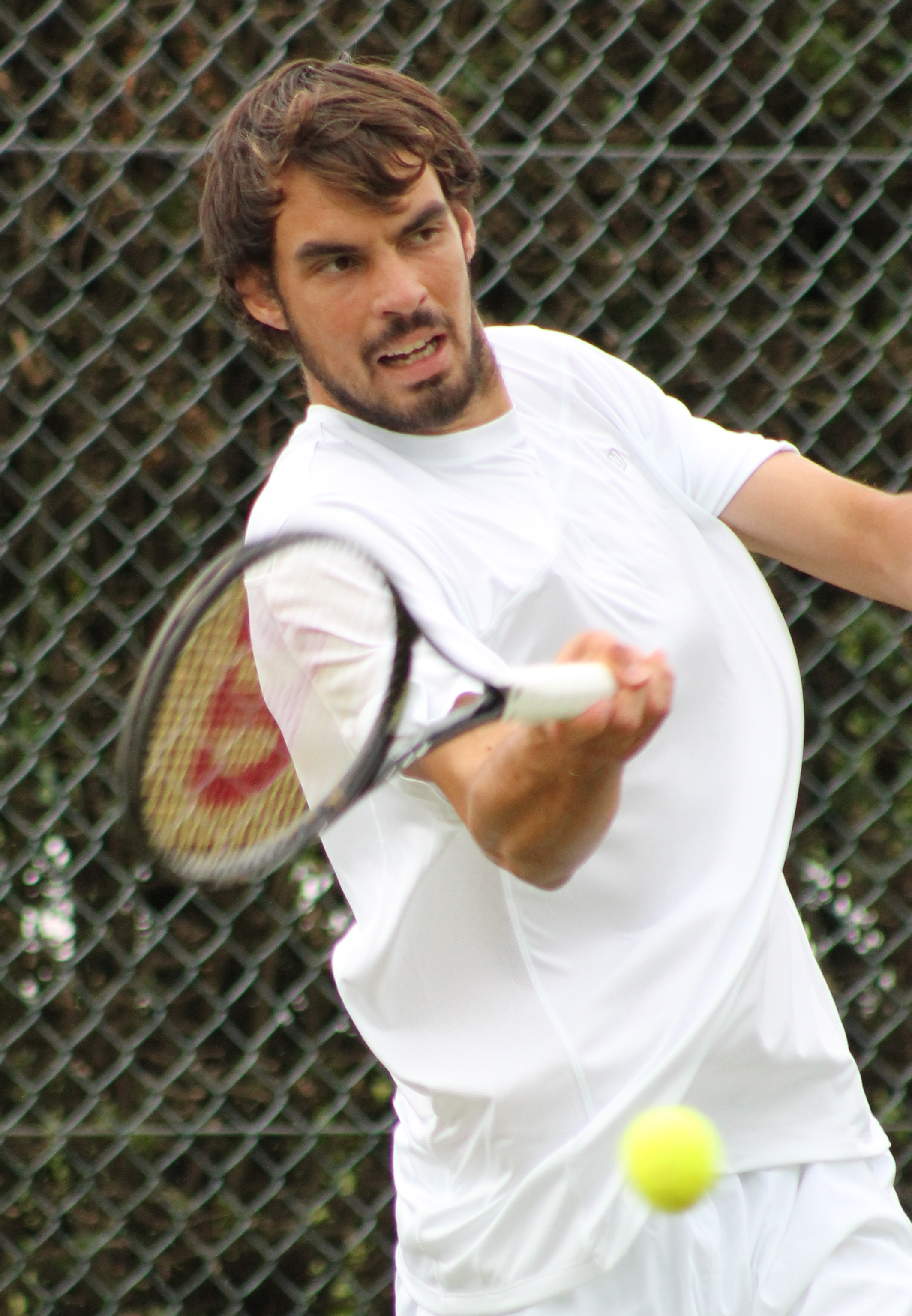
- Country (sports): Croatia
- Residence: Split, Croatia
- Born: 29 April 1993 (age 33) Split, Croatia
- Height: 1.96 m (6 ft 5 in)
- Turned pro: 2010
- Retired: 2020
- Plays: Right-handed, two-handed backhand
- Prize money: $193,036

Singles
- Career record: 3–12
- Career titles: 0
- Highest ranking: No. 150 (5 January 2015)

Grand Slam singles results
- Australian Open: Q2 (2015)
- French Open: Q1 (2015)
- Wimbledon: Q1 (2014)
- US Open: Q1 (2014)

Doubles
- Career record: 0–2
- Career titles: 0
- Highest ranking: No. 348 (28 October 2013)
- Last updated on: 21 April 2021.

Mate Delić (Croatian pronunciation: [mǎːte děliːtɕ]; born 29 April 1993) is a Croatian tennis coach and a former professional player. He primarily played on the ITF Futures Tour and ATP Challenger Tour. Delic has reached a career high singles ranking of world No. 150, achieved on 5 January 2015, as well as a career high doubles ranking of world No. 348, achieved on 18 October 2013. Delic has reached 18 career singles finals, posting a tally of 5 wins and 13 losses, which includes a 0–2 record in ATP Challenger Tour finals. Additionally, he has reached 13 career singles finals with a record of 7 wins and 6 losses all coming on the ITF Futures Tour.

== Juniors ==
As a junior, Delic reached a career high combined singles and doubles ranking of world No. 19, which he achieved on 31 December 2011. His best results in the junior grand slams were a semifinal finish at the 2011 French Open in singles where he lost to Dominic Thiem and a semifinal finish at the 2011 Australian Open in doubles, partnering Joris De Loore where they lost to Jiří Veselý and Filip Horansky.

== Professional career ==
In July 2011, Delic made his ATP Tour debut when he was granted a wildcard entry into the main draw of the 2011 Croatian Open. He would go on the lose to Italian Gianluca Naso in straight sets 4–6, 2–6. In 2014 he was given a wildcard into the main draw of the 2014 Zagreb Indoors where again he was defeated in the first round, this time by compatriot and fifth seed Marin Čilić 4–6, 4–6. Three months later at the 2014 Düsseldorf Open he qualified for a main draw for the first time in his career, and then went on to defeat Michał Przysiężny in the first round 7–5, 7–5, as well as Dustin Brown in the second round 6–3, 6–0, before eventually falling in the quarterfinals to Philipp Kohlschreiber in three sets 5–7, 6–4, 1–6. His only other win at the ATP Tour level was in a singles tie of Davis Cup play, where he represents his native Croatia.

== Coaching career ==
In 2022, he started coaching fellow Croatian Borna Ćorić. In 2024 he was the coach of Dominic Thiem.

== ATP Challenger and ITF Futures finals ==
=== Singles: 18 (5–13) ===
Legend ATP Challenger (0–2) ITF Futures (5–11)	Finals by surface Hard (1–6) Clay (3–7) Grass (0–0) Carpet (1–0)

Result	W–L	Date	Tournament	Tier	Surface	Opponent	Score
Win	1–0	Nov 2012	Greece F7, Heraklion	Futures	Carpet	(Serbia) Nikola Ćaćić	6–4, 7–6^{(7–3)}
Win	2–0	May 2013	Turkey F20, Antalya	Futures	Hard	(France) Hugo Nys	3–6, 7–5, 6–4
Win	3–0	Jun 2013	Bosnia & Herzegovina F4, Kiseljak	Futures	Clay	(Bosnia and Herzegovina) Damir Džumhur	7–5, 6–2
Loss	3–1	Nov 2013	Croatia F10, Solin	Futures	Clay	(Croatia) Nikola Mektić	6–7^{(5–7)}, 6–7^{(2–7)}
Loss	3–2	Jan 2014	Israel F3, Eilat	Futures	Hard	(Israel) Amir Weintraub	4–6, 2–6
Loss	3–3	Mar 2014	Turkey F10, Antalya	Futures	Hard	(Slovakia) Karol Beck	6–7^{(5–7)}, 6–3, 3–6
Loss	3–4	Apr 2014	Vercelli, Italy	Challenger	Clay	(Italy) Simone Bolelli	2–6, 2–6
Loss	3–5	Sep 2014	Genoa, Italy	Challenger	Clay	(Spain) Albert Ramos Viñolas	1–6, 5–7
Loss	3–6	Oct 2015	Turkey F42, Antalya	Futures	Hard	(Bulgaria) Dimitar Kuzmanov	6–0, 6–7^{(8–10)}, 1–6
Win	4–6	Nov 2015	Turkey F45, Antalya	Futures	Clay	(Bosnia and Herzegovina) Tomislav Brkić	3–6, 6–4, 6–1
Loss	4–7	Jan 2016	Turkey F1, Antalya	Futures	Hard	(Czech Republic) Michal Konečný	4–6, 6–7^{(6–8)}
Loss	4–8	Jan 2016	Turkey F2, Antalya	Futures	Hard	(Ukraine) Vadym Ursu	0–6, 4–6
Loss	4–9	Apr 2017	Turkey F14, Antalya	Futures	Clay	(Turkey) Marsel İlhan	2–6, 5–7
Loss	4–10	Apr 2017	Turkey F15, Antalya	Futures	Clay	(Uruguay) Martín Cuevas	6–4, 4–6, 1–6
Loss	4–11	Oct 2017	Turkey F36, Antalya	Futures	Clay	(Austria) Dennis Novak	3–6, 4–6
Loss	4–12	Oct 2017	Turkey F37, Antalya	Futures	Clay	(Germany) Peter Torebko	2–6, 2–6
Loss	4–13	Jan 2018	Turkey F3, Antalya	Futures	Hard	(Bulgaria) Dimitar Kuzmanov	3–6, 4–6
Win	5–13	May 2018	Turkey F17, Antalya	Futures	Clay	(Netherlands) Gijs Brouwer	6–0, 6–4

=== Doubles: 13 (7–6) ===
Legend ATP Challenger (0–0) ITF Futures (7–6)	Finals by surface Hard (0–3) Clay (5–3) Grass (0–0) Carpet (2–0)

Result	W–L	Date	Tournament	Tier	Surface	Partner	Opponents	Score
Loss	0–1	Feb 2011	Croatia F2, Zagreb	Futures	Hard	(Croatia) Kristijan Mesaroš	(Croatia) Ante Pavić (Croatia) Mislav Hizak	3–6, 7–6^{(7–3)}, [4–10]
Loss	0–2	Feb 2012	Croatia F1, Zagreb	Futures	Hard	(Bosnia and Herzegovina) Mirza Bašić	(Romania) Andrei Dăescu (Romania) Florin Mergea	5–7, 1–6
Win	1–2	Oct 2012	Croatia F10, Solin	Futures	Clay	(Croatia) Tomislav Draganja	(Czech Republic) Jaroslav Pospíšil (Slovakia) Andrej Martin	6–3, 4–6, [11–9]
Win	2–2	Nov 2012	Greece F6, Heraklion	Futures	Carpet	(Serbia) Nikola Ćaćić	(Belgium) Julien Dubail (Belgium) Yannick Vandenbulcke	7–5, 6–2
Win	3–2	Nov 2012	Greece F7, Heraklion	Futures	Carpet	(Serbia) Nikola Ćaćić	(Belgium) Julien Dubail (France) Evan Couacoud	6–1, 6–2
Loss	3–3	Feb 2013	Turkey F7, Antalya	Futures	Hard	(Serbia) Ilija Vucic	(China) Chang Yu (China) Li Zhe	5–7, 6–3, [9–11]
Win	4–3	Mar 2013	Croatia F6, Vrsar	Futures	Clay	(Bosnia and Herzegovina) Tomislav Brkić	(Czech Republic) Lukas Marsoun (Czech Republic) Dominik Suc	2–6, 7–6^{(7–3)}, [10–8]
Loss	4–4	Apr 2013	Italy F4, Padua	Futures	Clay	(Croatia) Joško Topić	(Italy) Matteo Donati (Kazakhstan) Andrey Golubev	6–7^{(6–8)}, 6–3, [6–10]
Win	5–4	Jun 2013	Bosnia & Herzegovina F4, Kiseljak	Futures	Clay	(Croatia) Tomislav Draganja	(Croatia) Filip Veger (Croatia) Lovro Zovko	6–4, 6–3
Win	6–4	Aug 2013	Italy F22, Este	Futures	Clay	(Italy) Stefano Travaglia	(Chile) Jorge Aguilar (Chile) Guillermo Hormazábal	6–0, 6–1
Win	7–4	Oct 2013	Croatia F10, Solin	Futures	Clay	(Bosnia and Herzegovina) Tomislav Brkić	(Russia) Aleksandre Kondulukov (Russia) Alexey Kondulukov	6–2, 4–6, [10–4]
Loss	7–5	Oct 2013	Croatia F11, Dubrovnik	Futures	Clay	(Bosnia and Herzegovina) Tomislav Brkić	(Czech Republic) Dominik Suc (Czech Republic) Marek Michalička	6–7^{(2–7)}, 1–6
Loss	7–6	Aug 2016	Austria F5, Innsbruck	Futures	Clay	(Croatia) Duje Delic	(United States) Dusty H. Boyer (Germany) Lukas Ollert	2–6, 3–6
