= 2024 Lexington Challenger – Men's doubles =

Men's doubles
- 2024 Lexington Challenger

Final
- Champions: (Sweden) André Göransson (Netherlands) Sem Verbeek
- Runners-up: (Japan) Yuta Shimizu (Japan) James Trotter
- Score: 6–4, 6–3

Events
Singles	men	women
Doubles	men	women
← 2023 ·	Lexington Challenger	· 2025 →

Eliot Spizzirri and Tyler Zink were the defending champions but chose not to defend their title.

André Göransson and Sem Verbeek won the title after defeating Yuta Shimizu and James Trotter 6–4, 6–3 in the final.

== Seeds ==
1. (Sweden) André Göransson / (Netherlands) Sem Verbeek (champions)
2. (United States) Ryan Seggerman / (United States) Patrik Trhac (semifinals)
3. (Mexico) Hans Hach Verdugo / (India) Niki Kaliyanda Poonacha (quarterfinals)
4. (Ecuador) Andrés Andrade / (United Kingdom) Charles Broom (withdrew)

== Draw ==
=== Key ===
- Q = Qualifier
- WC = Wild card
- LL = Lucky loser
- Alt = Alternate
- ITF = ITF entry
- PR = Protected ranking
- SR = Special ranking
- SE = Special exempt
- JE = Junior exempt
- JR = Junior Accelerator Programme entrant
- CO = College Accelerator Programme entrant
- NG = Next Gen Accelerator Program entrant
- w/o = Walkover
- r = Retired
- d = Defaulted

=== Draw ===
First round
1	(Sweden) A Göransson (Netherlands) S Verbeek	7^{7}	6
(United States) B Kuzuhara (Hong Kong) C Wong	6^{2}	3
(New Zealand) F Reynolds (Chile) M Soto	6	3	[9]
(United Kingdom) A McHugh (United States) E Nava	4	6	[11]
3	(Mexico) H Hach Verdugo (India) N Kaliyanda Poonacha	6	6
WC	(United States) G Nanda (United States) C Williams	3	4
WC	(Canada) Joshua Lapadat (United States) JJ Mercer	6	3	[8]
(United States) T Hilderbrand (United States) A Lawson	4	6	[10]
(Canada) L Draxl (Canada) K Stevenson	4	7^{7}	[6]
(Australia) P Harper (Australia) C Puttergill	6	6^{4}	[10]
(Japan) Y Shimizu (Japan) J Trotter	5	6	[10]
Alt	(Australia) A Taylor (Australia) B Tomic	7	3	[2]
(Australia) L Saville (Australia) L Tu	5	2
(Japan) Ryuki Matsuda (Japan) R Noguchi	7	6
(United States) M Kiger (Canada) B Sigouin	6	6^{1}	[9]
2	(United States) R Seggerman (United States) P Trhac	3	7^{7}	[11]

Quarterfinals
1	(Sweden) A Göransson (Netherlands) S Verbeek	4	6	[10]
(United Kingdom) A McHugh (United States) E Nava	6	3	[2]
3	(Mexico) H Hach Verdugo (India) N Kaliyanda Poonacha	4	7^{8}	[8]
(United States) T Hilderbrand (United States) A Lawson	6	6^{6}	[10]
(Australia) P Harper (Australia) C Puttergill	3	3
(Japan) Y Shimizu (Japan) J Trotter	6	6
(Japan) R Matsuda (Japan) R Noguchi	5	2
2	(United States) R Seggerman (United States) P Trhac	7	6

Semifinals
1	(Sweden) A Göransson (Netherlands) S Verbeek	7^{7}	7^{7}
(United States) T Hilderbrand (United States) A Lawson	6^{4}	6^{3}
(Japan) Y Shimizu (Japan) J Trotter	6	6
2	(United States) R Seggerman (United States) P Trhac	3	4

Final
1	(Sweden) A Göransson (Netherlands) S Verbeek	6	6
(Japan) Y Shimizu (Japan) J Trotter	4	3
