= 2023 Lexington Challenger – Men's singles =

Men's singles
- 2023 Lexington Challenger

Final
- Champion: (United States) Steve Johnson
- Runner-up: (France) Arthur Cazaux
- Score: 7–6^{(7–5)}, 6–4

Events
Singles	men	women
Doubles	men	women
← 2022 ·	Lexington Challenger	· 2024 →

Shang Juncheng was the defending champion but chose not to defend his title.

Steve Johnson won the title after defeating Arthur Cazaux 7–6^{(7–5)}, 6–4 in the final.

== Seeds ==
1. (France) Arthur Cazaux (final)
2. (United States) Steve Johnson (champion)
3. (Chinese Taipei) Wu Tung-lin (quarterfinals)
4. (South Korea) Hong Seong-chan (quarterfinals)
5. (United States) Tennys Sandgren (semifinals)
6. (Australia) Dane Sweeny (second round)
7. (Australia) Adam Walton (second round)
8. (Australia) Tristan Schoolkate (second round)

== Draw ==
=== Key ===
- Q = Qualifier
- WC = Wild card
- LL = Lucky loser
- Alt = Alternate
- ITF = ITF entry
- PR = Protected ranking
- SR = Special ranking
- SE = Special exempt
- JE = Junior exempt
- JR = Junior Accelerator Programme entrant
- CO = College Accelerator Programme entrant
- NG = Next Gen Accelerator Program entrant
- w/o = Walkover
- r = Retired
- d = Defaulted

=== Finals ===
Semifinals
1	(France) Arthur Cazaux	6	7^{8}
WC	(United States) Cannon Kingsley	2	6^{6}
5	(United States) Tennys Sandgren	6^{1}	3
2	(United States) Steve Johnson	7^{7}	6

Final
1	(France) Arthur Cazaux	6^{5}	4
2	(United States) Steve Johnson	7^{7}	6

=== Top half ===
First round
1	(France) A Cazaux	7	4	6
Q	(Canada) J Boulais	5	6	4
(United Kingdom) R Peniston	5	2
(Australia) O Jasika	7	6
Alt	(United States) Nathan Ponwith	4	1
Q	(United States) A Mayo	6	6
Q	(Australia) P Sekulic	6	6^{3}	1
8	(Australia) T Schoolkate	3	7^{7}	6
3	(Chinese Taipei) T-l Wu	6	6
(United States) Christian Langmo	4	4
(Paraguay) AD Vallejo	6	4	6
(Australia) A Bolt	4	6	1
WC	(United States) C Kingsley	6	4	6
Q	(Japan) Yuki Mochizuki	4	6	3
Q	(United States) T Boyer	3	4
6	(Australia) D Sweeny	6	6

Second round
1	(France) A Cazaux	6	6
(Australia) O Jasika	2	3
Q	(United States) A Mayo	3	6	6
8	(Australia) T Schoolkate	6	4	3
3	(Chinese Taipei) T-l Wu	6	7^{7}
(Paraguay) AD Vallejo	4	6^{4}
WC	(United States) C Kingsley	6	7
6	(Australia) D Sweeny	4	5

Quarterfinals
1	(France) A Cazaux	6	6
Q	(United States) A Mayo	1	4
3	(Chinese Taipei) T-l Wu	3	2
WC	(United States) C Kingsley	6	6

Semifinals
1	(France) A Cazaux	6	7^{8}
WC	(United States) C Kingsley	2	6^{6}

=== Bottom half ===
First round
5	(United States) T Sandgren	7	6
WC	(Canada) Joshua Lapadat	5	3
(United States) S Kirchheimer	6^{4}	7^{7}	7^{7}
WC	(United States) M Damm	7^{7}	6^{5}	6^{4}
(Australia) B Tomic	6	2	6
Q	(United States) S Dostanic	4	6	1
(Vietnam) NH Lý	1	5
4	(South Korea) S-c Hong	6	7
7	(Australia) A Walton	4	6	6
(France) M Janvier	6	3	3
(United Kingdom) A McHugh	6^{2}	4
Alt	(United States) U Blanch	7^{7}	6
(United States) E Spizzirri	7^{7}	6
PR	(United States) C Harrison	6^{4}	4
(United Kingdom) B Harris	6^{5}	4
2	(United States) S Johnson	7^{7}	6

Second round
5	(United States) T Sandgren	6	6
(United States) S Kirchheimer	2	4
(Australia) B Tomic	1	2
4	(South Korea) S-c Hong	6	6
7	(Australia) A Walton	3	3
Alt	(United States) U Blanch	6	6
(United States) E Spizzirri	3	5
2	(United States) S Johnson	6	7

Quarterfinals
5	(United States) T Sandgren	6	6
4	(South Korea) S-c Hong	4	2
Alt	(United States) U Blanch	3	4
2	(United States) S Johnson	6	6

Semifinals
5	(United States) T Sandgren	6^{1}	3
2	(United States) S Johnson	7^{7}	6
