= 2025 Lexington Open – Women's doubles =

Women's doubles
- 2025 Lexington Open

Final
- Champions: (United States) Ayana Akli (United States) Eryn Cayetano
- Runners-up: (United States) Elvina Kalieva (United States) Alana Smith
- Score: 4–6, 6–2, [10–4]

Events
Singles	men	women
Doubles	men	women
- Lexington Open

Whitney Osuigwe and Alana Smith were the defending champions of the previous 2024 doubles competition, but did not pair for this event.

Ayana Akli and Eryn Cayetano won the 2025 title, defeating Elvina Kalieva and Alana Smith in the final: 4–6, 6–2, [10–4].

== Seeds ==
1. (United States) Jessie Aney / (United States) Jessica Failla (quarterfinals)
2. (United States) Makenna Jones / (United States) Anna Rogers (first round)
3. (Netherlands) Arianne Hartono / (India) Prarthana Thombare (first round)
4. (Brazil) Laura Pigossi / (United States) Christina Rosca (first round)

== Main Draw ==
Key

- Q = Qualifier
- WC = Wild card
- LL = Lucky loser
- Alt = Alternate
- ITF = ITF entry
- PR = Protected ranking
- SR = Special ranking
- SE = Special exempt
- JE = Junior exempt
- JR = Junior Accelerator Programme entrant
- CO = College Accelerator Programme entrant
- NG = Next Gen Accelerator Program entrant
- w/o = Walkover
- r = Retired
- d = Defaulted

=== Draw ===
First round
1	(United States) J Aney (United States) J Failla	6	6
(United States) F Crawley (Japan) H Kuwata	1	3
(United States) H Chang (United States) C McHale	0	4
(United States) E Kalieva (United States) A Smith	6	6
3	(Netherlands) A Hartono (India) P Thombare	3	4
(United States) C Ngounoue (Australia) A Osborne	6	6
(United States) UM Arconada (Australia) P Hule	6	6
WC	(United States) M Fuduric (United States) E Myers	3	0
(United States) J Daniel (United States) M Zamarripa	6	6
WC	(United States) Z Hammond (Chile) A Jadue	1	3
(United States) R Anderson (United States) V Hu	2	6	[10]
4	(Brazil) L Pigossi (United States) C Rosca	6	3	[7]
(United States) A Akli (United States) E Cayetano	6	6
WC	(United States) K Day (United States) K Scott	4	4
(Japan) S Imamura (Indonesia) J Tjen	7	6
2	(United States) M Jones (United States) A Rogers	5	3

Quarterfinals
(United States) J Aney (United States) J Failla	4	2
(United States) E Kalieva (United States) A Smith	6	6
(United States) C Ngounoue (Australia) A Osborne
(United States) UM Arconada (Australia) P Hule	w/o
(United States) J Daniel (United States) M Zamarripa	6	2^{r}
(United States) R Anderson (United States) V Hu	1	4
(United States) A Akli (United States) E Cayetano	6	6
(Japan) S Imamura (Indonesia) J Tjen	1	2

Semifinals
(United States) E Kalieva (United States) A Smith	w/o
(United States) UM Arconada (Australia) P Hule
(United States) R Anderson (United States) V Hu	2	6^{5}
(United States) A Akli (United States) E Cayetano	6	7

Final
(United States) E Kalieva (United States) A Smith	6	2	[4]
(United States) A Akli (United States) E Cayetano	4	6	[10]
