= 2024 Knoxville Challenger – Singles =

Singles
- 2024 Knoxville Challenger

Final
- Champion: (United States) Christopher Eubanks
- Runner-up: (United States) Learner Tien
- Score: 7–5, 7–6^{(11–9)}

Events
Singles	Doubles
← 2023 ·	Knoxville Challenger	· 2025 →

Alex Michelsen was the defending champion but chose not to defend his title.

Christopher Eubanks won the title after defeating Learner Tien 7–5, 7–6^{(11–9)} in the final.

== Seeds ==
1. (Australia) Adam Walton (first round)
2. (United States) Christopher Eubanks (champion)
3. (United States) Learner Tien (final)
4. (United States) Mitchell Krueger (second round)
5. (United States) Zachary Svajda (second round)
6. (United States) Patrick Kypson (second round)
7. (Argentina) Juan Pablo Ficovich (first round)
8. (Kazakhstan) Dmitry Popko (first round)

== Draw ==
Key

- Q = Qualifier
- WC = Wild card
- LL = Lucky loser
- Alt = Alternate
- ITF = ITF entry
- PR = Protected ranking
- SR = Special ranking
- SE = Special exempt
- JE = Junior exempt
- JR = Junior Accelerator Programme entrant
- CO = College Accelerator Programme entrant
- NG = Next Gen Accelerator Program entrant
- w/o = Walkover
- r = Retired
- d = Defaulted

=== Finals ===
Semifinals
(United States) Nishesh Basavareddy	2	4
3	(United States) Learner Tien	6	6
(United Kingdom) Johannus Monday	6^{5}	6	6^{1}
2	(United States) Christopher Eubanks	7^{7}	4	7^{7}

Final
3	(United States) Learner Tien	5	6^{9}
2	(United States) Christopher Eubanks	7	7^{11}

=== Top half ===
First round
1	(Australia) A Walton	4	3
(United States) B Holt	6	6
(Estonia) M Lajal	6	7
(United Kingdom) P Jubb	3	5
(United States) N Basavareddy	6	6
WC	(United States) C Smith	2	4
(United States) E Quinn	6	3	5
5	(United States) Z Svajda	3	6	7
3	(United States) L Tien	6	6
Q	(Germany) M Wiskandt	4	2
(Kazakhstan) B Zhukayev	5	4
Q	(United States) Micah Braswell	7	6
Q	(United States) T Kodat	5	5
(Australia) B Tomic	7	7
Alt	(United Kingdom) J Clarke	6	2	7^{7}
8	(Kazakhstan) D Popko	3	6	6^{0}

Second round
(United States) B Holt	4	6^{5}
(Estonia) M Lajal	6	7^{7}
(United States) N Basavareddy	6	6
5	(United States) Z Svajda	4	0
3	(United States) L Tien	4	6	7^{7}
Q	(United States) M Braswell	6	2	6^{1}
(Australia) B Tomic	6	3	5
Alt	(United Kingdom) J Clarke	4	6	7

Quarterfinals
(Estonia) M Lajal	3	6^{3}
(United States) N Basavareddy	6	7^{7}
3	(United States) L Tien	6^{8}	6	6
Alt	(United Kingdom) J Clarke	7^{10}	3	2

Semifinals
(United States) N Basavareddy	2	4
3	(United States) L Tien	6	6

=== Bottom half ===
First round
6	(United States) P Kypson	3	6	7^{9}
Q	(United States) Alexander Kotzen	6	3	6^{7}
(Colombia) N Mejía	6	4	3
(United Kingdom) J Monday	3	6	6
SE	(Japan) J Trotter	6	6
Q	(Japan) Kenta Miyoshi	4	4
(United States) D Kudla	4	0^{r}
4	(United States) M Krueger	6	1
7	(Argentina) JP Ficovich	6	3	3
(United States) E Spizzirri	3	6	6
Alt	(Brazil) K Sell	6	6
WC	(Japan) S Mitsui	0	1
WC	(United States) M Cassone	6	2	6
Q	(United States) S Dostanic	3	6	3
(Austria) J Schwärzler	4	1
2	(United States) C Eubanks	6	6

Second round
6	(United States) P Kypson	6	3	6^{7}
(United Kingdom) J Monday	3	6	7^{9}
SE	(Japan) J Trotter	7	6
4	(United States) M Krueger	5	2
(United States) E Spizzirri	3	7	6
Alt	(Brazil) K Sell	6	5	1
WC	(United States) M Cassone	2	6	3
2	(United States) C Eubanks	6	2	6

Quarterfinals
(United Kingdom) J Monday	6	7^{7}
SE	(Japan) J Trotter	4	6^{2}
(United States) E Spizzirri	7	3	6^{5}
2	(United States) C Eubanks	5	6	7^{7}

Semifinals
(United Kingdom) J Monday	6^{5}	6	6^{1}
2	(United States) C Eubanks	7^{7}	4	7^{7}
