= 2026 ASB Classic – Men's singles =

Men's singles
- 2026 ASB Classic

Final
- Champion: (Czech Republic) Jakub Menšík
- Runner-up: (Argentina) Sebastián Báez
- Score: 6–3, 7–6^{(9–7)}

Details
- Draw: 28 (4 Q / 3 WC )
- Seeds: 8

Events
Singles	men	women
Doubles	men	women
- ATP Auckland Open

Jakub Menšík defeated Sebastián Báez in the final, 6–3, 7–6^{(9–7)} to win the men's singles tennis title at the 2026 ASB Classic. It was his second ATP Tour title.

Gaël Monfils was the defending champion, but lost in the first round to Fábián Marozsán.

== Seeds ==
The top four seeds received a bye into the second round.

1. (United States) Ben Shelton (quarterfinals)
2. (Norway) Casper Ruud (second round)
3. (Czech Republic) Jakub Menšík (champion)
4. (Italy) Luciano Darderi (quarterfinals)
5. (United Kingdom) Cameron Norrie (second round)
6. (United States) Alex Michelsen (second round)
7. (Argentina) Sebastián Báez (final)
8. (Portugal) Nuno Borges (second round)

== Draw ==
Key

- Q = Qualifier
- WC = Wild card
- LL = Lucky loser
- Alt = Alternate
- ITF = ITF entry
- PR = Protected ranking
- SR = Special ranking
- SE = Special exempt
- JE = Junior exempt
- JR = Junior Accelerator Programme entrant
- CO = College Accelerator Programme entrant
- NG = Next Gen Accelerator Program entrant
- w/o = Walkover
- r = Retired
- d = Defaulted

=== Finals ===
Semifinals
7	(Argentina) Sebastián Báez	6	6
SE	(United States) Marcos Giron	1	4
3	(Czech Republic) Jakub Menšík	7^{11}	4	6
(Hungary) Fábián Marozsán	6^{9}	6	1

Final
7	(Argentina) Sebastián Báez	3	6^{7}
3	(Czech Republic) Jakub Menšík	6	7^{9}

=== Top half ===
First round
(Argentina) F Comesaña	6	6
(France) V Royer	4	4
(United States) J Brooksby	6	6
WC	(New Zealand) J Watt	4	3
Q	(United States) E Nava	6	5	3
7	(Argentina) S Báez	4	7	6
WC	(Chile) A Tabilo	6	6
(Argentina) C Ugo Carabelli	4	2
(France) A Müller	2	2
SE	(United States) M Giron	6	6
(Argentina) M Navone	6	2	5
6	(United States) A Michelsen	2	6	7

Second round
1	(United States) B Shelton	7	6
(Argentina) F Comesaña	5	4
(United States) J Brooksby	5	0
7	(Argentina) S Báez	7	6
4	(Italy) L Darderi	1	7	6
WC	(Chile) A Tabilo	6	5	3
SE	(United States) M Giron	6	6
6	(United States) A Michelsen	4	4

Quarterfinals
1	(United States) B Shelton	5	3
7	(Argentina) S Báez	7	6
4	(Italy) L Darderi	6	5	4
SE	(United States) M Giron	1	7	6

Semifinals
7	(Argentina) S Báez	6	6
SE	(United States) M Giron	1	4

=== Bottom half ===
First round
5	(United Kingdom) C Norrie	6	6
Q	(France) H Gaston	3	4
WC	(Spain) R Bautista Agut	3	6^{2}
(France) G Mpetshi Perricard	6	7^{7}
Q	(Serbia) H Medjedovic	6	3	7^{7}
(United States) A Kovacevic	4	6	6^{2}
8	(Portugal) N Borges	7	3	7^{7}
(Argentina) TM Etcheverry	5	6	6^{2}
(France) A Mannarino	4	3
Q	(United States) E Spizzirri	6	6
(Hungary) F Marozsán	5	6	6
(France) G Monfils	7	3	4

Second round
5	(United Kingdom) C Norrie	6	3	6^{4}
(France) G Mpetshi Perricard	4	6	7^{7}
Q	(Serbia) H Medjedovic	1	6	3
3	(Czech Republic) J Menšík	6	3	6
8	(Portugal) N Borges	6^{6}	4
Q	(United States) E Spizzirri	7^{8}	6
(Hungary) F Marozsán	6	6
2	(Norway) C Ruud	4	4

Quarterfinals
(France) G Mpetshi Perricard	4	2
3	(Czech Republic) J Menšík	6	6
Q	(United States) E Spizzirri	4	6	2
(Hungary) F Marozsán	6	2	6

Semifinals
3	(Czech Republic) J Menšík	7^{11}	4	6
(Hungary) F Marozsán	6^{9}	6	1

== Qualifying ==
=== Seeds ===
1. (France) Adrian Mannarino (moved to main draw)
2. (Argentina) Mariano Navone (moved to main draw)
3. (Italy) Mattia Bellucci (qualifying competition)
4. (Chile) Cristian Garín (first round)
5. (Serbia) Hamad Medjedovic (qualified)
6. (Chile) Alejandro Tabilo (received wildcard to main draw)
7. (Germany) Jan-Lennard Struff (qualifying competition)
8. (Argentina) Juan Manuel Cerúndolo (qualifying competition)

=== Qualifiers ===
1. (France) Hugo Gaston
2. (United States) Emilio Nava
3. (Serbia) Hamad Medjedovic
4. (United States) Eliot Spizzirri

=== Draw ===
==== First qualifier ====
First round
Alt	(Czech Republic) Vít Kopřiva	6	1	6
(Spain) Pablo Carreño Busta	3	6	4
WC	(New Zealand) Isaac Becroft	3	2
Alt	(France) Hugo Gaston	6	6

Qualifying competition
Alt	(Czech Republic) Vít Kopřiva	2	4
Alt	(France) Hugo Gaston	6	6

==== Second qualifier ====
First round
Alt	(United States) Patrick Kypson	3	4
(United States) Emilio Nava	6	6
WC	(New Zealand) Anton Shepp	5	2
7	(Germany) Jan-Lennard Struff	7	6

Qualifying competition
(United States) Emilio Nava	3	6	6
7	(Germany) Jan-Lennard Struff	6	4	3

==== Third qualifier ====
First round
3	(Italy) Mattia Bellucci	6	6
Alt	(France) Geoffrey Blancaneaux	3	4
(Czech Republic) Dalibor Svrčina	1	4
5	(Serbia) Hamad Medjedovic	6	6

Qualifying competition
3	(Italy) Mattia Bellucci	3	2
5	(Serbia) Hamad Medjedovic	6	6

==== Fourth qualifier ====
First round
4	(Chile) Cristian Garín	2	4
(United States) Eliot Spizzirri	6	6
(Japan) Shintaro Mochizuki	4	7^{7}	2
8	(Argentina) Juan Manuel Cerúndolo	6	6^{3}	6

Qualifying competition
(United States) Eliot Spizzirri	6	6
8	(Argentina) Juan Manuel Cerúndolo	4	3
