= 2025 San Diego Open – Singles =

Singles
- 2025 San Diego Open

Final
- Champion: (United States) Eliot Spizzirri
- Runner-up: (United States) Mackenzie McDonald
- Score: 6–4, 2–6, 6–4

Events
Singles	Doubles
San Diego Open	· 2026 →

This was the first edition of the tournament as an ATP Challenger Tour event.

Eliot Spizzirri won the title after defeating Mackenzie McDonald 6–4, 2–6, 6–4 in the final.

== Seeds ==
1. (France) Arthur Cazaux (quarterfinals)
2. (United States) Tristan Boyer (first round)
3. (Germany) Dominik Koepfer (withdrew)
4. (United States) Mackenzie McDonald (final)
5. (Poland) Kamil Majchrzak (semifinals)
6. (Japan) Taro Daniel (quarterfinals)
7. (United States) Mitchell Krueger (second round)
8. (United States) Ethan Quinn (semifinals)

== Draw ==
=== Key ===
- Q = Qualifier
- WC = Wild card
- LL = Lucky loser
- Alt = Alternate
- ITF = ITF entry
- PR = Protected ranking
- SR = Special ranking
- SE = Special exempt
- JE = Junior exempt
- JR = Junior Accelerator Programme entrant
- CO = College Accelerator Programme entrant
- NG = Next Gen Accelerator Program entrant
- w/o = Walkover
- r = Retired
- d = Defaulted

=== Finals ===
Semifinals
8	(United States) Ethan Quinn	3	6	3
(United States) Eliot Spizzirri	6	4	6
4	(United States) Mackenzie McDonald	3	6	6
5	(Poland) Kamil Majchrzak	6	1	1

Final
(United States) Eliot Spizzirri	6	2	6
4	(United States) Mackenzie McDonald	4	6	4

=== Top half ===
First round
1	(France) A Cazaux	6	6
(Australia) L Tu	3	4
(France) C Lestienne	6	6
LL	(United States) S Dostanic	3	4
WC	(United States) J Brooksby	6	6
(Hong Kong) C Wong	2	4
Q	(United States) A Perez	4	6^{3}
8	(United States) E Quinn	6	7^{7}
Q	(United States) A Martin	6	3	6
(United States) Z Svajda	4	6	3
Q	(Mexico) A Hernández	3	1
(United States) E Spizzirri	6	6
Q	(United States) A Rybakov	7^{7}	6
(Moldova) R Albot	6^{2}	3
(United States) T Zink	4	4
6	(Japan) T Daniel	6	6

Second round
1	(France) A Cazaux	7	6
(France) C Lestienne	5	4
WC	(United States) J Brooksby	3	7	6^{5}
8	(United States) E Quinn	6	5	7^{7}
Q	(United States) A Martin	6	1	4
(United States) E Spizzirri	1	6	6
Q	(United States) A Rybakov	6^{9}	6^{1}
6	(Japan) T Daniel	7^{11}	7^{7}

Quarterfinals
1	(France) A Cazaux	5	7^{7}	4
8	(United States) E Quinn	7	6^{1}	6
(United States) E Spizzirri	6^{2}	6	6
6	(Japan) T Daniel	7^{7}	0	4

Semifinals
8	(United States) E Quinn	3	6	3
(United States) E Spizzirri	6	4	6

=== Bottom half ===
First round
7	(United States) M Krueger	6	3	6
(Ecuador) A Andrade	4	6	1
(United Kingdom) J Pinnington Jones	3	6^{4}
WC	(United States) T Svajda	6	7^{7}
(Italy) M Gigante	6	6
Q	(United States) Rohan Murali	2	4
(Brazil) K Sell	3	3
4	(United States) M McDonald	6	6
5	(Poland) K Majchrzak	7^{7}	6
(United States) C Smith	6^{3}	4
Q	(Jamaica) B Bicknell	6	6^{4}	4
(United States) M Mmoh	2	7^{7}	6
(France) T Atmane	6^{5}	6	5
Alt	(United States) G Nanda	7^{7}	4	7
(Australia) A Bolt	6	7^{7}
2/WC	(United States) T Boyer	3	6^{4}

Second round
7	(United States) M Krueger	3	3
WC	(United States) T Svajda	6	6
(Italy) M Gigante	3	5
4	(United States) M McDonald	6	7
5	(Poland) K Majchrzak	7	7
(United States) M Mmoh	5	5
Alt	(United States) G Nanda	4	3
(Australia) A Bolt	6	6

Quarterfinals
WC	(United States) T Svajda	3	4
4	(United States) M McDonald	6	6
5	(Poland) K Majchrzak	7^{7}	1
(Australia) A Bolt	6^{2}	1^{r}

Semifinals
4	(United States) M McDonald	3	6	6
5	(Poland) K Majchrzak	6	1	1
