= 2024 Knoxville Challenger =

- Date: 4–10 November
- Edition: 20th
- Surface: Hard (Indoor)
- Location: Knoxville, United States

Champions

Singles
- (United States) Christopher Eubanks

Doubles
- (Australia) Patrick Harper / (United Kingdom) Johannus Monday
← 2023 ·	Knoxville Challenger	· 2025 →

The 2024 Knoxville Challenger was a professional tennis tournament played on indoor hard courts. It was the 20th edition of the tournament which was part of the 2024 ATP Challenger Tour. It took place in Knoxville, United States between 4 and 10 November 2024.

== Singles main-draw entrants ==
=== Seeds ===
Country	Player	Rank^{1}	Seed
AUS	Adam Walton	92	1
USA	Christopher Eubanks	119	2
USA	Learner Tien	125	3
USA	Mitchell Krueger	144	4
USA	Zachary Svajda	165	5
USA	Patrick Kypson	169	6
ARG	Juan Pablo Ficovich	174	7
KAZ	Dmitry Popko	175	8

- ^{1} Rankings are as of October 28, 2024.

=== Other entrants ===
The following players received wildcards into the singles main draw:

- (United States) Murphy Cassone
- (Japan) Shunsuke Mitsui
- (United States) Colton Smith

The following player received entry into the singles main draw as a special exempt:

- (Japan) James Trottter

The following players received entry into the singles main draw as alternates:

- (United Kingdom) Jay Clarke
- (Brazil) Karue Sell

The following players received entry from the qualifying draw:

- (United States) Micah Braswell
- (United States) Stefan Dostanic
- (United States) Toby Kodat
- (United States) Alexander Kotzen
- (Japan) Kenta Miyoshi
- (Germany) Max Wiskandt

== Champions ==
=== Singles ===
- (United States) Christopher Eubanks def. (United States) Learner Tien 7–5, 7–6^{(11–9)}.

=== Doubles ===
- (Australia) Patrick Harper / (United Kingdom) Johannus Monday def. (United States) Micah Braswell / (United States) Eliot Spizzirri 6–2, 6–2.
