= 2025 Lexington Open – Men's singles =

Men's singles
- 2025 Lexington Open

Final
- Champion: (United States) Zachary Svajda
- Runner-up: (Australia) Bernard Tomic
- Score: 2–6, 6–3, 6–2

Events
Singles	men	women
Doubles	men	women
- Lexington Open

João Fonseca was the defending champion but chose not to defend his title.

Zachary Svajda won the title after defeating Bernard Tomic 2–6, 6–3, 6–2 in the final.

== Seeds ==
1. (United States) Nishesh Basavareddy (quarterfinals)
2. (United States) Eliot Spizzirri (semifinals)
3. (United Kingdom) Dan Evans (second round)
4. (Denmark) August Holmgren (first round, retired)
5. (United Kingdom) Billy Harris (first round)
6. (United States) Zachary Svajda (champion)
7. (United States) Christopher Eubanks (second round)
8. (Lebanon) Hady Habib (second round)

== Draw ==
Key

- Q = Qualifier
- WC = Wild card
- LL = Lucky loser
- Alt = Alternate
- ITF = ITF entry
- PR = Protected ranking
- SR = Special ranking
- SE = Special exempt
- JE = Junior exempt
- JR = Junior Accelerator Programme entrant
- CO = College Accelerator Programme entrant
- NG = Next Gen Accelerator Program entrant
- w/o = Walkover
- r = Retired
- d = Defaulted

=== Finals ===
Semifinals
6	(United States) Zachary Svajda	6	6
(Chinese Taipei) Hsu Yu-hsiou	1	3
(Australia) Bernard Tomic	6	2	7^{7}
2/WC	(United States) Eliot Spizzirri	3	6	6^{3}

Final
6	(United States) Zachary Svajda	2	6	6
(Australia) Bernard Tomic	6	3	2

=== Top half ===
First round
1	(United States) N Basavareddy	6	6
(Mexico) R Pacheco Méndez	3	3
(Kazakhstan) B Zhukayev	6^{3}	7^{7}	6^{1}
A Kachmazov	7^{7}	6^{2}	7^{7}
Q	(Japan) Ryuki Matsuda	6^{2}	7	1
(Australia) O Jasika	7^{7}	5	0^{r}
Q	(United States) A Rybakov	2	6^{10}
6	(United States) Z Svajda	6	7^{12}
3	(United Kingdom) D Evans	6	6
Alt	(Ecuador) A Andrade	3	3
CO	(United States) M Zheng	6	6
SE	(United States) A Martin	4	4
(Chinese Taipei) Y-h Hsu	6	6
(United States) M Cassone	2	3
Q	(United States) A Mayo	6^{4}	6	3
7	(United States) C Eubanks	7^{7}	3	6

Second round
1	(United States) N Basavareddy	7	6
A Kachmazov	5	0
Q	(Japan) R Matsuda	1	0
6	(United States) Z Svajda	6	6
3	(United Kingdom) D Evans	1	3
CO	(United States) M Zheng	6	6
(Chinese Taipei) Y-h Hsu	6	6
7	(United States) C Eubanks	4	4

Quarterfinals
1	(United States) N Basavareddy	6	5	4
6	(United States) Z Svajda	1	7	6
CO	(United States) M Zheng	1	5
(Chinese Taipei) Y-h Hsu	6	7

Semifinals
6	(United States) Z Svajda	6	6
(Chinese Taipei) Y-h Hsu	1	3

=== Bottom half ===
First round
8	(Lebanon) H Habib	6	6
NG	(China) Y Zhou	1	2
Q	(United Kingdom) G Hussey	6	3	6
(Australia) A Bolt	4	6	3
WC	(United States) S Banerjee	4	4
(Australia) B Tomic	6	6
(Colombia) N Mejía	6^{5}	7	5
4	(Denmark) A Holmgren	7^{7}	5	1^{r}
5	(United Kingdom) B Harris	3	5
Q	(India) D Suresh	6	7
PR	(South Africa) L Harris	5	2^{r}
(Estonia) M Lajal	7	4
WC	(France) A Ghibaudo	6	4	2
JR	(Japan) R Sakamoto	1	6	6
Q	(United States) S Dostanic	3	2
2/WC	(United States) E Spizzirri	6	6

Second round
8	(Lebanon) H Habib	6^{7}	3
Q	(United Kingdom) G Hussey	7^{9}	6
(Australia) B Tomic	7^{7}	6
(Colombia) N Mejía	6^{4}	3
Q	(India) D Suresh	6^{4}	6	6
(Estonia) M Lajal	7^{7}	4	4
JR	(Japan) R Sakamoto	6^{5}	7^{9}	3^{r}
2/WC	(United States) E Spizzirri	7^{7}	6^{7}	4

Quarterfinals
Q	(United Kingdom) G Hussey	6^{5}	3
(Australia) B Tomic	7^{7}	6
Q	(India) D Suresh	6^{4}	4
2/WC	(United States) E Spizzirri	7^{7}	6

Semifinals
(Australia) B Tomic	6	2	7^{7}
2/WC	(United States) E Spizzirri	3	6	6^{3}
