= 2023 Lexington Challenger – Men's doubles =

Men's doubles
- 2023 Lexington Challenger

Final
- Champions: (United States) Eliot Spizzirri (United States) Tyler Zink
- Runners-up: (United States) George Goldhoff (United States) Vasil Kirkov
- Score: 4–6, 6–3, [10–8]

Events
Singles	men	women
Doubles	men	women
← 2022 ·	Lexington Challenger	· 2024 →

Yuki Bhambri and Saketh Myneni were the defending champions but chose not to defend their title.

Eliot Spizzirri and Tyler Zink won the title after defeating George Goldhoff and Vasil Kirkov 4–6, 6–3, [10–8] in the final.

== Seeds ==
1. (United States) Hunter Reese / (New Zealand) Artem Sitak (first round)
2. (Philippines) Ruben Gonzales / (United States) Alex Lawson (first round)
3. (Latvia) Miķelis Lībietis / (Australia) Adam Walton (quarterfinals)
4. (India) Purav Raja / (India) Ramkumar Ramanathan (first round)

== Draw ==
=== Key ===
- Q = Qualifier
- WC = Wild card
- LL = Lucky loser
- Alt = Alternate
- SE = Special exempt
- PR = Protected ranking
- ITF = ITF entry
- JE = Junior exempt
- w/o = Walkover
- r = Retired
- d = Defaulted
- SR = Special ranking

First round
1	(United States) H Reese (New Zealand) A Sitak	4	5
(United Kingdom) B Harris (Canada) K Stevenson	6	7
(United States) C Harrison (United States) T Sandgren	4	2
(South Korea) S-c Hong (Vietnam) NH Lý	6	6
3	(Latvia) M Lībietis (Australia) A Walton	6	6
(United Kingdom) S Duncan (United Kingdom) L Johnson	1	2
(Australia) A Bolt (United Kingdom) R Peniston	6^{5}	4
(United States) G Goldhoff (United States) V Kirkov	7^{7}	6
(Greece) M Pervolarakis (United States) Nathan Ponwith	1	4
WC	(United States) E Spizzirri (United States) T Zink	6	6
(Australia) B Ellis (Australia) T Schoolkate	6	6
4	(India) P Raja (India) R Ramanathan	3	4
(Australia) C Puttergill (Australia) D Sweeny	6	5	[10]
WC	(Canada) Joshua Lapadat (United States) JJ Mercer	4	7	[8]
(United States) M Kiger (Canada) B Sigouin	7^{7}	6
2	(Philippines) R Gonzales (United States) A Lawson	6^{5}	4

Quarterfinals
(United Kingdom) B Harris (Canada) K Stevenson	6^{4}	6	[10]
(South Korea) S-c Hong (Vietnam) NH Lý	7^{7}	1	[8]
3	(Latvia) M Lībietis (Australia) A Walton	2	2
(United States) G Goldhoff (United States) V Kirkov	6	6
WC	(United States) E Spizzirri (United States) T Zink	6	6
(Australia) B Ellis (Australia) T Schoolkate	2	3
(Australia) C Puttergill (Australia) D Sweeny	4	7	[7]
(United States) M Kiger (Canada) B Sigouin	6	5	[10]

Semifinals
(United Kingdom) B Harris (Canada) K Stevenson	4	3
(United States) G Goldhoff (United States) V Kirkov	6	6
WC	(United States) E Spizzirri (United States) T Zink	6	6
(United States) M Kiger (Canada) B Sigouin	3	3

Final
(United States) G Goldhoff (United States) V Kirkov	6	3	[8]
WC	(United States) E Spizzirri (United States) T Zink	4	6	[10]
