= 2026 ASB Classic – Women's doubles =

Women's doubles
- 2026 ASB Classic

Final
- Champions: (China) Guo Hanyu (France) Kristina Mladenovic
- Runners-up: (China) Xu Yifan (China) Yang Zhaoxuan
- Score: 7–6^{(9–7)}, 6–1

Details
- Draw: 16 (2 WC )
- Seeds: 4

Events
Singles	men	women
Doubles	men	women
- WTA Auckland Open

Guo Hanyu and Kristina Mladenovic defeated Xu Yifan and Yang Zhaoxuan in the final, 7–6^{(9–7)}, 6–1 to win the women's doubles tennis title at the 2026 ASB Classic.

Jiang Xinyu and Wu Fang-hsien were the reigning champions, but both players chose to compete at Brisbane instead with different partners.

== Seeds ==
1. (United States) Asia Muhammad / (New Zealand) Erin Routliffe (first round)
2. (China) Guo Hanyu / (France) Kristina Mladenovic (champions)
3. (China) Xu Yifan / (China) Yang Zhaoxuan (final)
4. (Japan) Makoto Ninomiya / (Indonesia) Aldila Sutjiadi (quarterfinals)

== Draw ==
Key

- Q = Qualifier
- WC = Wild card
- LL = Lucky loser
- Alt = Alternate
- ITF = ITF entry
- PR = Protected ranking
- SR = Special ranking
- SE = Special exempt
- JE = Junior exempt
- JR = Junior Accelerator Programme entrant
- CO = College Accelerator Programme entrant
- NG = Next Gen Accelerator Program entrant
- w/o = Walkover
- r = Retired
- d = Defaulted

=== Draw ===
First round
1	(United States) A Muhammad (New Zealand) E Routliffe	6	2	[10]
(Czech Republic) J Malečková (Mexico) R Zarazúa	3	6	[12]
(Philippines) A Eala (United States) I Jovic	7^{9}	6
WC	(Ukraine) E Svitolina (United States) V Williams	6^{7}	1
3	(China) Y Xu (China) Z Yang	6	6
WC	(New Zealand) M Barry (New Zealand) E Tse	0	1
(Netherlands) I Haverlag (United Kingdom) M Lumsden	6	6^{1}	[12]
(Brazil) I Martins (Brazil) L Pigossi	2	7^{7}	[10]
(Belgium) M Kempen (Czech Republic) A Sisková	5	5
(United States) C McNally (Indonesia) J Tjen	7	7
Alt	(Slovenia) V Erjavec (Hungary) P Udvardy	6^{5}	4
4	(Japan) M Ninomiya (Indonesia) A Sutjiadi	7^{7}	6
(United States) S Santamaria (China) Q Tang	3	5
(Japan) S Aoyama (Poland) M Linette	6	7
(China) Xin Wang (China) S Zheng	1	5
2	(China) H Guo (France) K Mladenovic	6	7

Quarterfinals
(Czech Republic) J Malečková (Mexico) R Zarazúa
(Philippines) A Eala (United States) I Jovic	w/o
3	(China) Y Xu (China) Z Yang	6	1	[10]
(Netherlands) I Haverlag (United Kingdom) M Lumsden	4	6	[5]
(United States) C McNally (Indonesia) J Tjen	6	5	[10]
4	(Japan) M Ninomiya (Indonesia) A Sutjiadi	3	7	[5]
(Japan) S Aoyama (Poland) M Linette	1	4
2	(China) H Guo (France) K Mladenovic	6	6

Semifinals
(Philippines) A Eala (United States) I Jovic	5	3
3	(China) Y Xu (China) Z Yang	7	6
(United States) C McNally (Indonesia) J Tjen
2	(China) H Guo (France) K Mladenovic	w/o

Final
3	(China) Y Xu (China) Z Yang	6^{7}	1
2	(China) H Guo (France) K Mladenovic	7^{9}	6
