= 2025 San Diego Open =

- Date: 24 February – 2 March
- Edition: 1st
- Surface: Hard
- Location: San Diego, United States

Champions

Singles
- (United States) Eliot Spizzirri

Doubles
- (United States) Eliot Spizzirri / (United States) Tyler Zink
- San Diego Open

The 2025 Better Buzz Coffee San Diego Open was a professional tennis tournament played on hardcourts. It was the first edition of the tournament as an ATP Challenger Tour event which was part of the 2025 ATP Challenger Tour. It took place in San Diego, United States from 24 February to 2 March 2025. It returned as an ATP Challenger 100 replacing the WTA 500 event.

== Singles main-draw entrants ==
=== Seeds ===
Country	Player	Rank^{1}	Seed
FRA	Arthur Cazaux	100	1
USA	Tristan Boyer	109	2
~~GER~~	~~Dominik Koepfer~~	~~113~~	~~3~~
USA	Mackenzie McDonald	115	4
POL	Kamil Majchrzak	116	5
JPN	Taro Daniel	117	6
USA	Mitchell Krueger	140	7
USA	Ethan Quinn	144	8

- ^{1} Rankings are as of 17 February 2025.

=== Other entrants ===
The following players received wildcards into the singles main draw:

- (United States) Tristan Boyer
- (United States) Jenson Brooksby
- (United States) Trevor Svajda

The following player received entry into the singles main draw as an alternate:

- (United States) Govind Nanda

The following players received entry from the qualifying draw:

- (Jamaica) Blaise Bicknell
- (Mexico) Alex Hernández
- (United States) Andres Martin
- (United States) Rohan Murali
- (United States) Alfredo Perez
- (United States) Alex Rybakov

The following player received entry as a lucky loser:

- (United States) Stefan Dostanic

== Champions ==
=== Singles ===
- (United States) Eliot Spizzirri def. (United States) Mackenzie McDonald 6–4, 2–6, 6–4.

=== Doubles ===
- (United States) Eliot Spizzirri / (United States) Tyler Zink def. (Venezuela) Juan José Bianchi / (United States) Noah Zamora 6–7^{(3–7)}, 7–6^{(7–4)}, [10–8].
