= 2026 ASB Classic =

- Date: 5–11 January (women); 12–17 January (men)
- Edition: 39th (women); 48th (men)
- Category: WTA 250; ATP 250
- Draw: 32S / 16D (women); 28S / 16D (men)
- Surface: Hard
- Location: Auckland, New Zealand
- Venue: ASB Tennis Centre

Champions

Men's singles
- (Czech Republic) Jakub Menšík

Women's singles
- (Ukraine) Elina Svitolina

Men's doubles
- (France) Théo Arribagé / (France) Albano Olivetti

Women's doubles
- (China) Guo Hanyu / (France) Kristina Mladenovic
- Auckland Open

The 2026 ASB Classic was a joint professional men's and women's tennis tournament played on outdoor hard courts at the ASB Tennis Centre in Auckland. The 39th edition of the women's event (a WTA 250 tournament) was held from 5 to 11 January 2026 and the 48th edition of the men's event (an ATP 250 tournament) was held from 12 to 17 January 2026.

== Champions ==
=== Men's singles ===
- (Czech Republic) Jakub Menšík def. (Argentina) Sebastián Báez, 6–3, 7–6^{(9–7)}

=== Women's singles ===
- (Ukraine) Elina Svitolina def. (China) Wang Xinyu, 6–3, 7–6^{(8–6)}

=== Men's doubles ===
- (France) Théo Arribagé / (France) Albano Olivetti def. (Austria) Alexander Erler / (United States) Robert Galloway, 7–6^{(7–2)}, 6–4

=== Women's doubles ===
- (China) Guo Hanyu / (France) Kristina Mladenovic def. (China) Xu Yifan / (China) Yang Zhaoxuan, 7–6^{(9–7)}, 6–1

== ATP singles main draw entrants ==
=== Seeds ===
Country	Player	Rank^{1}	Seed
USA	Ben Shelton	8	1
NOR	Casper Ruud	12	2
CZE	Jakub Menšík	18	3
ITA	Luciano Darderi	24	4
GBR	Cameron Norrie	28	5
USA	Alex Michelsen	37	6
ARG	Sebastián Báez	43	7
POR	Nuno Borges	45	8

- ^{1} Rankings as of 5 January 2026.

=== Other entrants ===
The following players received wildcards into the singles main draw:

- (Spain) Roberto Bautista Agut
- (Chile) Alejandro Tabilo
- (New Zealand) James Watt

The following player received a special exempt into the main draw:

- (United States) Marcos Giron

The following players received entry from the qualifying draw:

- (France) Hugo Gaston
- (Serbia) Hamad Medjedovic
- (United States) Emilio Nava
- (United States) Eliot Spizzirri

=== Withdrawals ===
- (Italy) Lorenzo Sonego → replaced by (France) Gaël Monfils

== ATP doubles main draw entrants ==
=== Seeds ===
Country	Player	Country	Player	Rank^{1}	Seed
IND	Yuki Bhambri	SWE	André Göransson	43	1
POR	Francisco Cabral	AUT	Lucas Miedler	44	2
FRA	Sadio Doumbia	FRA	Fabien Reboul	60	3
USA	Robert Cash	USA	JJ Tracy	67	4

- ^{1} Rankings as of 5 January 2026.

=== Other entrants ===
The following pairs received wildcards into the doubles main draw:

- (New Zealand) Ajeet Rai / (Netherlands) Jean-Julien Rojer
- (New Zealand) Finn Reynolds / (New Zealand) James Watt

== WTA singles main draw entrants ==
=== Seeds ===
Country	Player	Rank^{1}	Seed
UKR	Elina Svitolina	14	1
USA	Emma Navarro	15	2
USA	Iva Jovic	35	3
PHI	Alexandra Eala	53	4
INA	Janice Tjen	54	5
POL	Magda Linette	55	6
CHN	Wang Xinyu	57	7
USA	Peyton Stearns	63	8

- ^{1} Rankings as of 29 December 2025.

=== Other entrants ===
The following players received wildcards into the singles main draw:

- (New Zealand) Monique Barry
- (United Kingdom) Katie Boulter
- (United States) Sloane Stephens
- (United States) Venus Williams

The following players received entry from the qualifying draw:

- (Belgium) Sofia Costoulas
- (Czech Republic) Gabriela Knutson
- (Austria) Sinja Kraus
- (United States) Whitney Osuigwe
- (Spain) Kaitlin Quevedo
- (Ukraine) Yuliia Starodubtseva

=== Withdrawals ===
- (New Zealand) Lulu Sun → replaced by (Austria) Julia Grabher

== WTA doubles main draw entrants ==
=== Seeds ===
Country	Player	Country	Player	Rank^{1}	Seed
USA	Asia Muhammad	NZL	Erin Routliffe	27	1
CHN	Guo Hanyu	FRA	Kristina Mladenovic	82	2
CHN	Xu Yifan	CHN	Yang Zhaoxuan	85	3
JPN	Makoto Ninomiya	INA	Aldila Sutjiadi	110	4

- ^{1} Rankings as of 29 December 2025.

=== Other entrants ===
The following pairs received a wildcard into the doubles main draw:

- (New Zealand) Monique Barry / (New Zealand) Elyse Tse
- (Ukraine) Elina Svitolina / (United States) Venus Williams

=== Withdrawals ===
- (Colombia) Camila Osorio / (United States) Peyton Stearns → replaced by (Slovenia) Veronika Erjavec / (Hungary) Panna Udvardy
