= 2026 ASB Classic – Men's doubles =

Men's doubles
- 2026 ASB Classic

Final
- Champions: (France) Théo Arribagé (France) Albano Olivetti
- Runners-up: (Austria) Alexander Erler (United States) Robert Galloway
- Score: 7–6^{(7–2)}, 6–4

Details
- Draw: 16
- Seeds: 4

Events
Singles	men	women
Doubles	men	women
- ATP Auckland Open

Théo Arribagé and Albano Olivetti defeated Alexander Erler and Robert Galloway in the final, 7–6^{(7–2)}, 6–4 to win the men's doubles tennis title at the 2026 ASB Classic. It was Arribage’s third ATP Tour doubles title and Olivetti’s fourth.

Nikola Mektić and Michael Venus were the reigning champions, but they did not participate this year.

== Seeds ==
1. (India) Yuki Bhambri / (Sweden) André Göransson (semifinals)
2. (Portugal) Francisco Cabral / (Austria) Lucas Miedler (semifinals)
3. (France) Sadio Doumbia / (France) Fabien Reboul (first round)
4. (United States) Robert Cash / (United States) JJ Tracy (first round)

== Draw ==
Key

- Q = Qualifier
- WC = Wild card
- LL = Lucky loser
- Alt = Alternate
- ITF = ITF entry
- PR = Protected ranking
- SR = Special ranking
- SE = Special exempt
- JE = Junior exempt
- JR = Junior Accelerator Programme entrant
- CO = College Accelerator Programme entrant
- NG = Next Gen Accelerator Program entrant
- w/o = Walkover
- r = Retired
- d = Defaulted

=== Draw ===
First round
1	(India) Y Bhambri (Sweden) A Göransson	6	6
WC	(New Zealand) A Rai (Netherlands) J-J Rojer	3	2
(Mexico) S González (Netherlands) D Pel	6^{5}	6	[8]
(Czech Republic) P Nouza (Czech Republic) P Rikl	7^{7}	4	[10]
3	(France) S Doumbia (France) F Reboul	6^{7}	4
(Austria) A Erler (United States) R Galloway	7^{9}	6
WC	(New Zealand) F Reynolds (New Zealand) J Watt	6	6^{2}	[13]
(Belgium) S Gillé (Netherlands) S Verbeek	4	7^{7}	[11]
(United States) V Kirkov (Netherlands) B Stevens	1	4
(France) T Arribagé (France) A Olivetti	6	6
(Germany) C Frantzen (Netherlands) R Haase	6	5	[10]
4	(United States) R Cash (United States) JJ Tracy	3	7	[7]
(Spain) Í Cervantes (Italy) L Darderi	6	6
(Argentina) TM Etcheverry (Argentina) C Ugo Carabelli	4	4
(Brazil) M Melo (Brazil) F Romboli	4	6^{5}
2	(Portugal) F Cabral (Austria) L Miedler	6	7^{7}

Quarterfinals
1	(India) Y Bhambri (Sweden) A Göransson	6	6^{3}	[10]
(Czech Republic) P Nouza (Czech Republic) P Rikl	3	7^{7}	[6]
(Austria) A Erler (United States) R Galloway	2	6	[15]
WC	(New Zealand) F Reynolds (New Zealand) J Watt	6	3	[13]
(France) T Arribagé (France) A Olivetti	7	7^{7}
(Germany) C Frantzen (Netherlands) R Haase	5	6^{4}
(Spain) Í Cervantes (Italy) L Darderi	1	2
2	(Portugal) F Cabral (Austria) L Miedler	6	6

Semifinals
1	(India) Y Bhambri (Sweden) A Göransson	4	6	[8]
(Austria) A Erler (United States) R Galloway	6	4	[10]
(France) T Arribagé (France) A Olivetti	6	7^{7}
2	(Portugal) F Cabral (Austria) L Miedler	2	6^{5}

Final
(Austria) A Erler (United States) R Galloway	6^{2}	4
(France) T Arribagé (France) A Olivetti	7^{7}	6
