= 2025 Brest Challenger =

- Date: 20–26 October
- Edition: 10th
- Surface: Hard (indoor)
- Location: Brest, France

Champions

Singles
- (France) Hugo Gaston

Doubles
- (Belgium) Sander Gillé / (Netherlands) Sem Verbeek
- Brest Challenger

The 2025 Brest Open Groupe Vert was a professional tennis tournament played on hard courts. It was the tenth edition of the tournament which was part of the 2025 ATP Challenger Tour. It took place in Brest, France between 20 and 26 October 2025.

== Singles main-draw entrants ==
=== Seeds ===
Country	Player	Rank^{1}	Seed
SRB	Laslo Djere	79	1
ITA	Luca Nardi	83	2
FRA	Hugo Gaston	97	3
~~ESP~~	~~Martín Landaluce~~	~~110~~	~~4~~
USA	Eliot Spizzirri	111	5
FIN	Otto Virtanen	116	6
~~USA~~	~~Nishesh Basavareddy~~	~~125~~	~~7~~
ITA	Francesco Passaro	141	8
ARG	Marco Trungelliti	142	9

- ^{1} Rankings are as of 13 October 2025.

=== Other entrants ===
The following players received wildcards into the singles main draw:

- (France) Dan Added
- (France) Hugo Gaston
- (France) Maé Malige

The following player received entry into the singles main draw using a protected ranking:

- (Finland) Emil Ruusuvuori

The following player received entry into the singles main draw as a special exempt:

- (United Kingdom) Harry Wendelken

The following players received entry into the singles main draw as alternates:

- (France) Arthur Bouquier
- (France) Calvin Hemery

The following players received entry from the qualifying draw:

- (Portugal) Jaime Faria
- (United Kingdom) Arthur Fery
- (Czech Republic) Jonáš Forejtek
- (France) Lucas Poullain
- (France) Clément Tabur
- Alexey Vatutin

The following player received entry as a lucky loser:

- (United States) Colton Smith

== Champions ==
=== Singles ===
- (France) Hugo Gaston def. (United States) Eliot Spizzirri 2–6, 6–2, 6–1.

=== Doubles ===
- (Belgium) Sander Gillé / (Netherlands) Sem Verbeek def. (France) Théo Arribagé / (France) Albano Olivetti 7–6^{(7–5)}, 7–6^{(7–4)}.
