= 2024 Lexington Challenger =

Tennis tournament

- Date: 29 July–4 August 2024
- Edition: 29th (men); 27th (women)
- Category: ATP Challenger Tour; ITF Women's World Tennis Tour
- Prize money: $82,000 (men) $60,000 (women)
- Surface: Hard / Outdoor
- Location: Lexington, United States

Champions

Men's singles
- (Brazil) João Fonseca

Women's singles
- (China) Wei Sijia

Men's doubles
- (Sweden) André Göransson / (Netherlands) Sem Verbeek

Women's doubles
- (United States) Whitney Osuigwe / (United States) Alana Smith
- Lexington Challenger

The 2024 Lexington Challenger presented by Meridian Wealth Management was a professional tennis tournament played on outdoor hard courts. It was the twenty-ninth edition of the tournament for men, which was part of the 2024 ATP Challenger Tour, and the twenty-seventh edition for women, which was part of the 2024 ITF Women's World Tennis Tour. It took place in Lexington, Kentucky, United States, between 29 July and 4 August 2024, at the Hilary J. Boone Tennis Complex, a facility of the University of Kentucky.

== Champions ==
=== Men's singles ===
- (Brazil) João Fonseca def. (Australia) Li Tu 6–1, 6–4.

=== Women's singles ===
- (China) Wei Sijia def. (Thailand) Mananchaya Sawangkaew 7–5, 6–4.

=== Men's doubles ===
- (Sweden) André Göransson / (Netherlands) Sem Verbeek def. (Japan) Yuta Shimizu / (Japan) James Trotter 6–4, 6–3.

=== Women's doubles ===
- (United States) Whitney Osuigwe / (United States) Alana Smith def. (United States) Carmen Corley / (United States) Ivana Corley, 7–6^{(7–5)}, 6–3.

== Men's singles main draw entrants ==
=== Seeds ===
Country	Player	Rank^{1}	Seed
~~CHN~~	~~Bu Yunchaokete~~	~~147~~	~~1~~
USA	Emilio Nava	150	2
CAN	Gabriel Diallo	169	3
HKG	Coleman Wong	180	4
FRA	Hugo Grenier	194	5
BRA	João Fonseca	217	6
AUS	Li Tu	219	7
AUS	Bernard Tomic	236	8
USA	Brandon Holt	238	9

- ^{1} Rankings as of 22 July 2024.

=== Other entrants ===
The following players received a wildcard into the singles main draw:

- (Canada) Taha Baadi
- (United States) Bruno Kuzuhara
- (United States) Learner Tien

The following player received entry into the singles main draw as a special exempt:

- (Canada) Gabriel Diallo

The following player received entry into the singles main draw as an alternate:

- (United States) Omni Kumar

The following players received entry from the qualifying draw:

- (United States) Micah Braswell
- (United States) Stefan Kozlov
- (Mexico) Rodrigo Pacheco Méndez
- (United Kingdom) Jack Pinnington Jones
- (United States) Ryan Seggerman
- (Japan) James Trotter

The following players received entry as lucky losers:

- (United States) ~~Cannon Kingsley~~
- (Japan) Yuta Shimizu

== Women's singles main draw entrants ==
=== Seeds ===
Country	Player	Rank	Seed
GBR	Lily Miyazaki	132	1
CAN	Rebecca Marino	151	2
AUS	Talia Gibson	166	3
USA	Elizabeth Mandlik	172	4
THA	Lanlana Tararudee	181	5
AUS	Destanee Aiava	189	6
CHN	Wei Sijia	194	7
USA	Hanna Chang	212	8

- Rankings are as of 22 July 2024.

=== Other entrants ===
The following players received wildcards into the singles main draw:

- (United States) Fiona Crawley
- (United States) Elizabeth Stevens

The following player received entry into the singles main draw using a special ranking:

- (United States) Usue Maitane Arconada

The following player received entry into the singles main draw as a special exempt:

- (United States) Robin Anderson

The following player received entry into the singles main draw through the College Accelerator Programme:

- (United States) Karina Miller

The following players received entry from the qualifying draw:

- (India) Shrivalli Bhamidipaty
- (Canada) Isabelle Boulais
- (Canada) Kayla Cross
- (United States) Jessica Failla
- (Japan) Hiroko Kuwata
- (United States) Lea Ma
- (United States) Whitney Osuigwe
- (United States) Katrina Scott
