= 2023 Lexington Challenger =

- Date: 31 July – 6 August
- Edition: 28th (men); 26th (women)
- Category: ATP Challenger Tour; ITF Women's World Tennis Tour
- Surface: Hard / Outdoor
- Location: Lexington, Kentucky, United States

Champions

Men's singles
- (United States) Steve Johnson

Women's singles
- (Mexico) Renata Zarazúa

Men's doubles
- (United States) Eliot Spizzirri / (United States) Tyler Zink

Women's doubles
- (United States) Alexis Blokhina / (United States) Ava Markham
- Lexington Challenger

The 2023 Lexington Challenger was a professional tennis tournament played on outdoor hard courts. It was the 28th edition of the tournament which was part of the 2023 ATP Challenger Tour, and the 26th edition of the tournament which was part of the 2023 ITF Women's World Tennis Tour. It took place in Lexington, Kentucky, United States between 31 July and 6 August 2023.

== Champions ==
=== Men's singles ===
- (United States) Steve Johnson def. (France) Arthur Cazaux 7–6^{(7–5)}, 6–4.

=== Men's doubles ===
- (United States) Eliot Spizzirri / (United States) Tyler Zink def. (United States) George Goldhoff / (United States) Vasil Kirkov 4–6, 6–3, [10–8].

=== Women's singles ===
- (Mexico) Renata Zarazúa def. (United States) Caroline Dolehide 1–6, 7–6^{(7–4)}, 7–5.

=== Women's doubles ===
- (United States) Alexis Blokhina / (United States) Ava Markham def. (Australia) Olivia Gadecki / (United States) Dalayna Hewitt 6–4, 7–6^{(7–1)}.

== Men's singles main draw entrants ==
=== Seeds ===
Country	Player	Rank^{1}	Seed
FRA	Arthur Cazaux	141	1
USA	Steve Johnson	190	2
TPE	Wu Tung-lin	195	3
KOR	Hong Seong-chan	206	4
USA	Tennys Sandgren	214	5
AUS	Dane Sweeny	230	6
AUS	Adam Walton	247	7
AUS	Tristan Schoolkate	264	8

- ^{1} Rankings as of 24 July 2023.

=== Other entrants ===
The following players received a wildcard into the singles main draw:

- (United States) Martin Damm
- (United States) Cannon Kingsley
- (Canada) Joshua Lapadat

The following player received entry into the singles main draw using a protected ranking:

- (United States) Christian Harrison

The following players received entry into the singles main draw as alternates:

- (United States) Ulises Blanch
- (United States) Nathan Ponwith

The following players received entry from the qualifying draw:

- (Canada) Justin Boulais
- (United States) Tristan Boyer
- (United States) Stefan Dostanic
- (United States) Aidan Mayo
- (Japan) Yuki Mochizuki
- (Australia) Philip Sekulic

== Women's singles main draw entrants ==
=== Seeds ===
Country	Player	Rank^{1}	Seed
USA	Caroline Dolehide	102	1
USA	Madison Brengle	103	2
AUS	Kimberly Birrell	111	3
USA	Katie Volynets	126	4
AUS	Olivia Gadecki	144	5
GBR	Katie Swan	148	6
JPN	Mai Hontama	179	7
CHN	Wang Yafan	182	8

- ^{1} Rankings as of 24 July 2023.

=== Other entrants ===
The following players received a wildcard into the singles main draw:

- (United States) Elizabeth Eades
- (United States) Dalayna Hewitt
- (United States) McCartney Kessler
- (United States) Madison Sieg

The following players received entry from the qualifying draw:

- (United States) Chloe Beck
- (United States) DJ Bennett
- (United States) Samantha Crawford
- (United States) Sara Daavettila
- (United States) Tatum Evans
- (United States) Victoria Hu
- (United States) Grace Min
- (United States) Christina Rosca
