= 2024 Lexington Challenger – Women's singles =

Women's singles
- 2024 Lexington Challenger

Final
- Champion: (China) Wei Sijia
- Runner-up: (Thailand) Mananchaya Sawangkaew
- Score: 7–5, 6–4

Events
Singles	men	women
Doubles	men	women
- Lexington Challenger

Renata Zarazúa was the defending champion but chose to compete in Washington DC instead.

Wei Sijia won the title, defeating Mananchaya Sawangkaew in the final, 7–5, 6–4.

== Seeds ==
1. (United Kingdom) Lily Miyazaki (second round)
2. (Canada) Rebecca Marino (semifinals)
3. (Australia) Talia Gibson (first round)
4. (United States) Elizabeth Mandlik (semifinals)
5. (Thailand) Lanlana Tararudee (first round)
6. (Australia) Destanee Aiava (first round)
7. (China) Wei Sijia (champion)
8. (United States) Hanna Chang (second round)

== Draw ==
Key

- Q = Qualifier
- WC = Wild card
- LL = Lucky loser
- Alt = Alternate
- ITF = ITF entry
- PR = Protected ranking
- SR = Special ranking
- SE = Special exempt
- JE = Junior exempt
- JR = Junior Accelerator Programme entrant
- CO = College Accelerator Programme entrant
- NG = Next Gen Accelerator Program entrant
- w/o = Walkover
- r = Retired
- d = Defaulted

=== Finals ===
Semifinals
7	(China) Wei Sijia	7^{7}	6
4	(United States) Elizabeth Mandlik	6^{3}	4
(Thailand) Mananchaya Sawangkaew	6	6
2	(Canada) Rebecca Marino	3	4

Final
7	(China) Wei Sijia	7	6
(Thailand) Mananchaya Sawangkaew	5	4

=== Top half ===
First round
1	(United Kingdom) L Miyazaki	6	6
WC	(United States) E Stevens	3	1
(United States) S Chang	7^{7}	7^{7}
(United States) E Kalieva	6^{5}	6^{4}
(United States) A Kiick	6	6
(United States) V Hu	0	3
Q	(United States) J Failla	4	4
7	(China) S Wei	6	6
4	(United States) E Mandlik	6	6
(United States) J Loeb	3	0
(United States) L Hovde	6	7^{9}
Q	(Canada) I Boulais	0	6^{7}
(Japan) H Sakatsume	6^{2}	3
Q	(United States) K Scott	7^{7}	6
SE	(United States) R Anderson	6	2	3
8	(United States) H Chang	3	6	6

Second round
1	(United Kingdom) L Miyazaki	4	7^{9}	2
(United States) S Chang	6	6^{7}	6
(United States) A Kiick	2	2
7	(China) S Wei	6	6
4	(United States) E Mandlik	1	6	6
(United States) L Hovde	6	3	1
Q	(United States) K Scott	6	7
8	(United States) H Chang	3	5

Quarterfinals
(United States) S Chang	3	1
7	(China) S Wei	6	6
4	(United States) E Mandlik	6	1	6
Q	(United States) K Scott	3	6	3

Semifinals
7	(China) S Wei	7^{7}	6
4	(United States) E Mandlik	6^{3}	4

=== Bottom half ===
First round
5	(Thailand) L Tararudee	1	4
(Thailand) M Sawangkaew	6	6
Q	(India) SR Bhamidipaty	6	7
WC	(United States) F Crawley	4	5
I Shymanovich	7	6
(India) S Yamalapalli	5	4
JE	(United States) K Miller	7^{7}	6
3	(Australia) T Gibson	6^{2}	0
6	(Australia) D Aiava	4	2
Q	(United States) W Osuigwe	6	6
SR	(United States) UM Arconada	7	6
(Chinese Taipei) E-s Liang	5	2
Q	(United States) L Ma	7	3	6
Q	(Japan) H Kuwata	5	6	0
Q	(Canada) K Cross	3	6	3
2	(Canada) R Marino	6	1	6

Second round
(Thailand) M Sawangkaew	3	6	6
Q	(India) SR Bhamidipaty	6	3	2
I Shymanovich	6	7^{11}
JE	(United States) K Miller	2	6^{9}
Q	(United States) W Osuigwe	7	6
SR	(United States) UM Arconada	5	4
Q	(United States) L Ma	4	1
2	(Canada) R Marino	6	6

Quarterfinals
(Thailand) M Sawangkaew	6	4
I Shymanovich	2	2^{r}
Q	(United States) W Osuigwe	6	4	3
2	(Canada) R Marino	2	6	6

Semifinals
(Thailand) M Sawangkaew	6	6
2	(Canada) R Marino	3	4
