= 2025 Brest Challenger – Singles =

Singles
- 2025 Brest Challenger

Final
- Champion: (France) Hugo Gaston
- Runner-up: (United States) Eliot Spizzirri
- Score: 2–6, 6–2, 6–1

Events
Singles	Doubles
- Brest Challenger

Otto Virtanen was the defending champion but lost in the first round to Clément Tabur.

Hugo Gaston won the title after defeating Eliot Spizzirri 2–6, 6–2, 6–1 in the final.

== Seeds ==
1. (Serbia) Laslo Djere (first round)
2. (Italy) Luca Nardi (first round)
3. (France) Hugo Gaston (champion)
4. (Spain) Martín Landaluce (withdrew)
5. (United States) Eliot Spizzirri (final)
6. (Finland) Otto Virtanen (first round)
7. (United States) Nishesh Basavareddy (withdrew)
8. (Italy) Francesco Passaro (semifinals)
9. (Argentina) Marco Trungelliti (first round)

== Draw ==
Key

- Q = Qualifier
- WC = Wild card
- LL = Lucky loser
- Alt = Alternate
- ITF = ITF entry
- PR = Protected ranking
- SR = Special ranking
- SE = Special exempt
- JE = Junior exempt
- JR = Junior Accelerator Programme entrant
- CO = College Accelerator Programme entrant
- NG = Next Gen Accelerator Program entrant
- w/o = Walkover
- r = Retired
- d = Defaulted

=== Finals ===
Semifinals
5	(United States) Eliot Spizzirri	7^{13}	6
8	(Italy) Francesco Passaro	6^{11}	3
3/WC	(France) Hugo Gaston	6	3	6
(Canada) Alexis Galarneau	4	6	4

Final
5	(United States) Eliot Spizzirri	6	2	1
3/WC	(France) Hugo Gaston	2	6	6

=== Top half ===
First round
1	(Serbia) L Djere	3	6	6^{5}
(Italy) G Zeppieri	6	3	7^{7}
(Belgium) K Coppejans	2	3
(Denmark) A Holmgren	6	6
(Estonia) M Lajal	2	7^{7}	6
Q	A Vatutin	6	6^{3}	4
Q	(Czech Republic) J Forejtek	6	6^{3}	3
5	(United States) E Spizzirri	3	7^{7}	6
9	(Argentina) M Trungelliti	5	3
WC	(France) D Added	7	6
(France) L Van Assche	1	6^{5}
(France) S Gueymard Wayenburg	6	7^{7}
(Ukraine) V Sachko	4	4
PR	(Finland) E Ruusuvuori	6	6
Q	(Portugal) J Faria	3	6	3
8	(Italy) F Passaro	6	3	6

Second round
(Italy) G Zeppieri	6	6
(Denmark) A Holmgren	3	2
(Estonia) M Lajal	6	1	3
5	(United States) E Spizzirri	3	6	6
WC	(France) D Added	6	4	6
(France) S Gueymard Wayenburg	3	6	3
PR	(Finland) E Ruusuvuori	6^{3}	7^{8}	6^{6}
8	(Italy) F Passaro	7^{7}	6^{6}	7^{8}

Quarterfinals
(Italy) G Zeppieri	7	6^{8}	6^{4}
5	(United States) E Spizzirri	5	7^{10}	7^{7}
WC	(France) D Added	6^{5}	6^{2}
8	(Italy) F Passaro	7^{7}	7^{7}

Semifinals
5	(United States) E Spizzirri	7^{13}	6
8	(Italy) F Passaro	6^{11}	3

=== Bottom half ===
First round
LL	(United States) C Smith	6	4	1
Q	(United Kingdom) A Fery	4	6	6
(France) H Grenier	7	6
Q	(France) L Poullain	5	4
(Italy) F Maestrelli	6^{3}	6	6
SE	(United Kingdom) H Wendelken	7^{7}	4	2
Alt	(France) C Hemery	1	6^{6}
3/WC	(France) H Gaston	6	7^{8}
6	(Finland) O Virtanen	6	6^{5}	6^{3}
Q	(France) C Tabur	4	7^{7}	7^{7}
WC	(France) Maé Malige	7	6
(Japan) R Sakamoto	5	1
(Tunisia) M Echargui	4	2
Alt	(France) A Bouquier	6	6
(Canada) A Galarneau	6	6
2	(Italy) L Nardi	4	1

Second round
Q	(United Kingdom) A Fery	4	6	7
(France) H Grenier	6	4	5
(Italy) F Maestrelli	6^{5}	1
3/WC	(France) H Gaston	7^{7}	6
Q	(France) C Tabur	6	6
WC	(France) M Malige	0	3
Alt	(France) A Bouquier	3	7	4
(Canada) A Galarneau	6	5	6

Quarterfinals
Q	(United Kingdom) A Fery	6^{3}	5
3/WC	(France) H Gaston	7^{7}	7
Q	(France) C Tabur	4	6	3
(Canada) A Galarneau	6	3	6

Semifinals
3/WC	(France) H Gaston	6	3	6
(Canada) A Galarneau	4	6	4
