= 2025 San Diego Open – Doubles =

Doubles
- 2025 San Diego Open

Final
- Champions: (United States) Eliot Spizzirri (United States) Tyler Zink
- Runners-up: (Venezuela) Juan José Bianchi (United States) Noah Zamora
- Score: 6–7^{(3–7)}, 7–6^{(7–4)}, [10–8]

Events
Singles	Doubles
- San Diego Open

This was the first edition of the tournament as an ATP Challenger Tour event.

Eliot Spizzirri and Tyler Zink won the title after defeating Juan José Bianchi and Noah Zamora 6–7^{(3–7)}, 7–6^{(7–4)}, [10–8] in the final.

== Seeds ==
1. (United States) Reese Stalder / (United States) Patrik Trhac (quarterfinals)
2. (United States) George Goldhoff / (United States) Trey Hilderbrand (semifinals)
3. (United States) Mitchell Krueger / (Venezuela) Luis David Martínez (first round, withdrew)
4. (Poland) Filip Pieczonka / (Canada) Benjamin Sigouin (first round)

== Draw ==
Key

- Q = Qualifier
- WC = Wild card
- LL = Lucky loser
- Alt = Alternate
- ITF = ITF entry
- PR = Protected ranking
- SR = Special ranking
- SE = Special exempt
- JE = Junior exempt
- JR = Junior Accelerator Programme entrant
- CO = College Accelerator Programme entrant
- NG = Next Gen Accelerator Program entrant
- w/o = Walkover
- r = Retired
- d = Defaulted

=== Draw ===
First round
1	(United States) R Stalder (United States) P Trhac	6	6
(United States) B Kuzuhara (Hong Kong) C Wong	4	0
PR	(Antigua and Barbuda) J Maginley (United States) A Perez	7^{7}	4	[11]
(Estonia) Johannes Seeman (United States) C Smith	6^{4}	6	[9]
3	(United States) M Krueger (Venezuela) LD Martínez
(United Kingdom) J Paris (United Kingdom) J Pinnington Jones	w/o
WC	(Venezuela) Juan José Bianchi (United States) Noah Zamora	6	6^{3}	[10]
WC	(United States) T Svajda (United States) Z Svajda	0	7^{7}	[5]
(Moldova) R Albot (Poland) K Majchrzak	6	7
(United States) Wally Thayne (United States) Tennyson Whiting	3	5
(United States) E Spizzirri (United States) T Zink	6	7^{7}
4	(Poland) F Pieczonka (Canada) B Sigouin	4	6^{3}
(United States) T Boyer (United States) Jamie Vance	6	4	[13]
(Australia) A Bolt (Australia) L Tu	3	6	[11]
(United States) P Kumar (United States) N Schachter	2	0
2	(United States) G Goldhoff (United States) T Hilderbrand	6	6

Quarterfinals
1	(United States) R Stalder (United States) P Trhac	6	5	[9]
PR	(Antigua and Barbuda) J Maginley (United States) A Perez	2	7	[11]
(United Kingdom) J Paris (United Kingdom) J Pinnington Jones	6	4	[8]
WC	(Venezuela) JJ Bianchi (United States) N Zamora	4	6	[10]
(Moldova) R Albot (Poland) K Majchrzak	3	6^{4}
(United States) E Spizzirri (United States) T Zink	6	7^{7}
(United States) T Boyer (United States) Jam Vance	4	5
2	(United States) G Goldhoff (United States) T Hilderbrand	6	7

Semifinals
PR	(Antigua and Barbuda) J Maginley (United States) A Perez	5	2
WC	(Venezuela) JJ Bianchi (United States) N Zamora	7	6
(United States) E Spizzirri (United States) T Zink	6	6
2	(United States) G Goldhoff (United States) T Hilderbrand	4	3

Final
WC	(Venezuela) JJ Bianchi (United States) N Zamora	7^{7}	6^{4}	[8]
(United States) E Spizzirri (United States) T Zink	6^{3}	7^{7}	[10]
