= 2025 Lexington Open =

- Date: 28 July–3 August
- Edition: 30th (men); 28th (women)
- Category: ATP Challenger Tour; ITF Women's World Tennis Tour
- Surface: Hard / Outdoor
- Location: Lexington, United States

Champions

Men's singles
- (United States) Zachary Svajda

Women's singles
- (China) Wang Xiyu

Men's doubles
- (India) Anirudh Chandrasekar / (India) Ramkumar Ramanathan

Women's doubles
- (United States) Ayana Akli / (United States) Eryn Cayetano
- Lexington Open

The 2025 Lexington Open was a professional tennis tournament played on outdoor hard courts. It was the 30th edition of the tournament for men, which was part of the 2025 ATP Challenger Tour, and the 28th edition for women, which was part of the 2025 ITF Women's World Tennis Tour. It took place in Lexington, Kentucky, United States, between 28 July and 3 August 2025.

== Champions ==
=== Men's singles ===
- (United States) Zachary Svajda def. (Australia) Bernard Tomic 2–6, 6–3, 6–2.

=== Women's singles ===
- (China) Wang Xiyu def. (Indonesia) Janice Tjen 3–6, 6–2, 6–4.

=== Men's doubles ===
- (India) Anirudh Chandrasekar / (India) Ramkumar Ramanathan def. (Chinese Taipei) Hsu Yu-hsiou / (Chinese Taipei) Huang Tsung-hao 6–4, 6–4.

=== Women's doubles ===
- (United States) Ayana Akli / (United States) Eryn Cayetano def. (United States) Elvina Kalieva / (United States) Alana Smith 4–6, 6–2, [10–4].

== Men's singles main draw entrants ==
=== Seeds ===
Country	Player	Rank^{1}	Seed
USA	Nishesh Basavareddy	112	1
USA	Eliot Spizzirri	131	2
GBR	Dan Evans	144	3
DEN	August Holmgren	146	4
GBR	Billy Harris	148	5
USA	Zachary Svajda	153	6
USA	Christopher Eubanks	155	7
LBN	Hady Habib	174	8

- ^{1} Rankings as of 21 July 2025.

=== Other entrants ===
The following players received a wildcard into the singles main draw:

- (United States) Samir Banerjee
- (France) Antoine Ghibaudo
- (United States) Eliot Spizzirri

The following player received entry into the singles main draw using a protected ranking:

- (South Africa) Lloyd Harris

The following player received entry into the singles main draw as a special exempt:

- (United States) Andres Martin

The following player received entry into the singles main draw through the College Accelerator programme:

- (United States) Michael Zheng

The following player received entry into the singles main draw through the Junior Accelerator programme:

- (Japan) Rei Sakamoto

The following player received entry into the singles main draw through the Next Gen Accelerator programme:

- (China) Zhou Yi

The following player received entry into the singles main draw as an alternate:

- (Ecuador) Andrés Andrade

The following players received entry from the qualifying draw:

- (United States) Stefan Dostanic
- (United Kingdom) Giles Hussey
- (Japan) Ryuki Matsuda
- (United States) Aidan Mayo
- (United States) Alex Rybakov
- (India) Dhakshineswar Suresh

== Women's singles main draw entrants ==
=== Seeds ===
Country	Player	Rank^{2}	Seed
	Anastasia Zakharova	85	1
USA	Varvara Lepchenko	126	2
FRA	Jessika Ponchet	162	3
CHN	Wang Xiyu	170	4
~~NED~~	~~Arianne Hartono~~	~~177~~	~~5~~
USA	Clervie Ngounoue	200	6
INA	Janice Tjen	204	7
BRA	Laura Pigossi	206	8

- ^{2} Rankings as of 21 July 2025.

=== Other entrants ===
The following players received a wildcard into the singles main draw:

- (United States) Kayla Day
- (United States) Zoe Hammond
- (United States) Amelia Honer
- (United States) Victoria Hu

The following player received entry into the singles main draw using a special ranking:

- (United States) Makenna Jones

The following players received entry from the qualifying draw:

- (United States) Usue Maitane Arconada
- (United States) Eryn Cayetano
- (United States) Fiona Crawley
- (Japan) Saki Imamura
- (United States) Lea Ma
- (United States) Victoria Osuigwe
- (United States) Katrina Scott
- (United States) Alana Smith

The following player received entry as a lucky loser:

- (United States) Sara Daavettila
