= 2026 ASB Classic – Women's singles =

Women's singles
- 2026 ASB Classic

Final
- Champion: (Ukraine) Elina Svitolina
- Runner-up: (China) Wang Xinyu
- Score: 6–3, 7–6^{(8–6)}

Details
- Draw: 32 (6 Q / 3 WC )
- Seeds: 8

Events
Singles	men	women
Doubles	men	women
- WTA Auckland Open

Elina Svitolina defeated Wang Xinyu in the final, 6–3, 7–6^{(8–6)} to win the women's singles tennis title at the 2026 ASB Classic. It was her 19th WTA Tour title.

Clara Tauson was the reigning champion, but chose to compete in Brisbane instead.

== Seeds ==
1. (Ukraine) Elina Svitolina (champion)
2. (United States) Emma Navarro (first round)
3. (United States) Iva Jovic (semifinals)
4. (Philippines) Alexandra Eala (semifinals)
5. (Poland) Magda Linette (quarterfinals)
6. (Indonesia) Janice Tjen (first round)
7. (China) Wang Xinyu (final)
8. (United States) Peyton Stearns (first round)

== Draw ==
Key

- Q = Qualifier
- WC = Wild card
- LL = Lucky loser
- Alt = Alternate
- ITF = ITF entry
- PR = Protected ranking
- SR = Special ranking
- SE = Special exempt
- JE = Junior exempt
- JR = Junior Accelerator Programme entrant
- CO = College Accelerator Programme entrant
- NG = Next Gen Accelerator Program entrant
- w/o = Walkover
- r = Retired
- d = Defaulted

=== Finals ===
Semifinals
1	(Ukraine) Elina Svitolina	7^{7}	6
3	(United States) Iva Jovic	6^{5}	2
4	(Philippines) Alexandra Eala	7	5	4
7	(China) Wang Xinyu	5	7	6

Final
1	(Ukraine) Elina Svitolina	6	7^{8}
7	(China) Wang Xinyu	3	6^{6}

=== Top half ===
First round
1	(Ukraine) E Svitolina	6	6
(France) V Gracheva	3	1
WC	(United Kingdom) K Boulter	6	6
Q	(Ukraine) Y Starodubtseva	3	3
WC	(New Zealand) M Barry	2	1
(Germany) E Seidel	6	6
(United Kingdom) S Kartal	6	6^{4}	6
6	(Indonesia) J Tjen	1	7^{7}	3
3	(United States) I Jovic	4	6	6
Q	(Czech Republic) G Knutson	6	1	0
(Hungary) P Udvardy	5	1
(Czech Republic) S Bejlek	7	6
Q	(Belgium) S Costoulas	6	3	6
Q	(United States) W Osuigwe	4	6	1
Q	(Spain) K Quevedo	6	7
8	(United States) P Stearns	2	5

Second round
1	(Ukraine) E Svitolina	7	6
WC	(United Kingdom) K Boulter	5	4
(Germany) E Seidel	3	1
(United Kingdom) S Kartal	6	6
3	(United States) I Jovic	7^{7}	6
(Czech Republic) S Bejlek	6^{3}	4
Q	(Belgium) S Costoulas	6	6
Q	(Spain) K Quevedo	2	0

Quarterfinals
1	(Ukraine) E Svitolina	6	6^{2}	7^{7}
(United Kingdom) S Kartal	4	7^{7}	6^{5}
3	(United States) I Jovic	6	7^{8}
Q	(Belgium) S Costoulas	2	6^{6}

Semifinals
1	(Ukraine) E Svitolina	7^{7}	6
3	(United States) I Jovic	6^{5}	2

=== Bottom half ===
First round
5	(Poland) M Linette	6	4	6
WC	(United States) V Williams	4	6	2
(United States) A Parks	2	5
(Italy) E Cocciaretto	6	7
(Colombia) C Osorio	4	6	6^{2}
(Croatia) P Marčinko	6	0	7^{7}
(Croatia) D Vekić	6	4	4
4	(Philippines) A Eala	4	6	6
7	(China) Xin Wang	2	6	7
(United States) C McNally	6	3	5
WC	(United States) S Stephens	5	6	2
(Mexico) R Zarazúa	7	4	6
Q	(Austria) S Kraus	6	6
(Austria) J Grabher	3	3
(United Kingdom) F Jones	7	2	6
2	(United States) E Navarro	5	6	4

Second round
5	(Poland) M Linette	7	2	6
(Italy) E Cocciaretto	5	6	3
(Croatia) P Marčinko	0	2
4	(Philippines) A Eala	6	6
7	(China) Xin Wang	7	6
(Mexico) R Zarazúa	5	4
Q	(Austria) S Kraus	6	4	1
(United Kingdom) F Jones	1	6	6

Quarterfinals
5	(Poland) M Linette	3	2
4	(Philippines) A Eala	6	6
7	(China) Xin Wang	6	4
(United Kingdom) F Jones	4	3^{r}

Semifinals
4	(Philippines) A Eala	7	5	4
7	(China) Xin Wang	5	7	6

== Qualifying ==
=== Seeds ===
1. (Latvia) Darja Semeņistaja (qualifying competition)
2. (Slovenia) Veronika Erjavec (qualifying competition)
3. (Austria) Sinja Kraus (qualified)
4. (Ukraine) Yuliia Starodubtseva (qualified)
5. (Spain) Leyre Romero Gormaz (first round)
6. (Spain) Kaitlin Quevedo (qualified)
7. (Poland) Maja Chwalińska (qualifying competition)
8. (Germany) Anna-Lena Friedsam (first round)
9. (United States) Whitney Osuigwe (qualified)
10. (Austria) Lilli Tagger (qualifying competition)
11. (Belgium) Sofia Costoulas (qualified)
12. Alina Charaeva (first round)

=== Qualifiers ===
1. (United States) Whitney Osuigwe
2. (Belgium) Sofia Costoulas
3. (Austria) Sinja Kraus
4. (Ukraine) Yuliia Starodubtseva
5. (Czech Republic) Gabriela Knutson
6. (Spain) Kaitlin Quevedo

=== Draw ===
==== First qualifier ====
First round
1	(Latvia) Darja Semeņistaja	6	6
(Canada) Cadence Brace	3	3
(United States) Louisa Chirico	6^{4}	3
9	(United States) Whitney Osuigwe	7^{7}	6

Qualifying competition
1	(Latvia) Darja Semeņistaja	2	6	5
9	(United States) Whitney Osuigwe	6	2	7

==== Second qualifier ====
First round
2	(Slovenia) Veronika Erjavec	6	6
WC	(New Zealand) Aishi Das	3	4
WC	(New Zealand) Elyse Tse	0	1
11	(Belgium) Sofia Costoulas	6	6

Qualifying competition
2	(Slovenia) Veronika Erjavec	3	6	3
11	(Belgium) Sofia Costoulas	6	4	6

==== Third qualifier ====
First round
3	(Austria) Sinja Kraus	6	6^{7}	6
(Latvia) Anastasija Sevastova	4	7^{9}	3
WC	(France) Kristina Mladenovic	7^{7}	6
8	(Germany) Anna-Lena Friedsam	6^{5}	4

Qualifying competition
3	(Austria) Sinja Kraus	7	7
WC	(France) Kristina Mladenovic	5	5

==== Fourth qualifier ====
First round
4	(Ukraine) Yuliia Starodubtseva	6	6
(France) Jessika Ponchet	3	3
(Brazil) Laura Pigossi	6	4	1
10	(Austria) Lilli Tagger	4	6	6

Qualifying competition
4	(Ukraine) Yuliia Starodubtseva	6	6
10	(Austria) Lilli Tagger	1	1

==== Fifth qualifier ====
First round
5	(Spain) Leyre Romero Gormaz	3	4
(Czech Republic) Gabriela Knutson	6	6
(China) Guo Hanyu	4	0
7	(Poland) Maja Chwalińska	6	6

Qualifying competition
(Czech Republic) Gabriela Knutson	6	6
7	(Poland) Maja Chwalińska	3	2

==== Sixth qualifier ====
First round
6	(Spain) Kaitlin Quevedo	6	6^{4}	6
(France) Carole Monnet	2	7^{7}	3
(South Korea) Ku Yeon-woo	6	6
12	Alina Charaeva	3	2

Qualifying competition
6	(Spain) Kaitlin Quevedo	1	6	6
(South Korea) Ku Yeon-woo	6	4	1
