= 2023 Lexington Challenger – Women's doubles =

Women's doubles
- 2023 Lexington Challenger

Final
- Champions: (United States) Alexis Blokhina (United States) Ava Markham
- Runners-up: (Australia) Olivia Gadecki (United States) Dalayna Hewitt
- Score: 6–4, 7–6^{(7–1)}

Events
Singles	men	women
Doubles	men	women
- Lexington Challenger

Aldila Sutjiadi and Kateryna Volodko were the defending champions but chose not to participate.

Alexis Blokhina and Ava Markham won the title, defeating Olivia Gadecki and Dalayna Hewitt in the final, 6–4, 7–6^{(7–1)}.

== Seeds ==
1. (United States) Makenna Jones / (United States) Jamie Loeb (first round)
2. (Australia) Olivia Gadecki / (United States) Dalayna Hewitt (final)
3. (Mexico) Marcela Zacarías / (Mexico) Renata Zarazúa (quarterfinals)
4. (Japan) Mai Hontama / (Japan) Kyōka Okamura (quarterfinals)

== Draw ==
Key

- Q = Qualifier
- WC = Wild card
- LL = Lucky loser
- Alt = Alternate
- ITF = ITF entry
- PR = Protected ranking
- SR = Special ranking
- SE = Special exempt
- JE = Junior exempt
- JR = Junior Accelerator Programme entrant
- CO = College Accelerator Programme entrant
- NG = Next Gen Accelerator Program entrant
- w/o = Walkover
- r = Retired
- d = Defaulted

First round
1	(United States) M Jones (United States) J Loeb	6	3	[9]
(United States) C Corley (United States) I Corley	2	6	[11]
(United States) A Li (United States) C Rosca	6	5	[7]
(Japan) H Sakatsume (Japan) M Uchijima	3	7	[10]
4	(Japan) M Hontama (Japan) K Okamura	7^{7}	6
M Kononova; M Kozyreva	6^{3}	1
(Chinese Taipei) C-y Hsu (India) S Yamalapalli	6	1	[10]
(United States) A Blokhina (United States) A Markham	3	6	[12]
WC	(United States) E Eades (United States) M Mills	7^{7}	3	[5]
(United States) A Lahey; V Miroshnichenko	6^{2}	6	[10]
(Bulgaria) E Tchakarova (Bulgaria) V Tchakarova	0	0
3	(Mexico) M Zacarías (Mexico) R Zarazúa	6	6
(United States) R Anderson (United States) V Hu	3	6	[10]
(United States) W Osuigwe (United States) M Sieg	6	2	[12]
(United States) C Beck (United States) S Daavettila	6	3	[3]
2	(Australia) O Gadecki (United States) D Hewitt	2	6	[10]

Quarterfinals
(United States) C Corley (United States) I Corley	5	6	[12]
(Japan) H Sakatsume (Japan) M Uchijima	7	2	[10]
4	(Japan) M Hontama (Japan) K Okamura	6	4	[8]
(United States) A Blokhina (United States) A Markham	4	6	[10]
(United States) A Lahey; V Miroshnichenko	6	3	[10]
3	(Mexico) M Zacarías (Mexico) R Zarazúa	3	6	[3]
(United States) W Osuigwe (United States) M Sieg	4	6^{3}
2	(Australia) O Gadecki (United States) D Hewitt	6	7^{7}

Semifinals
(United States) C Corley (United States) I Corley	5	1
(United States) A Blokhina (United States) A Markham	7	6
(United States) A Lahey; V Miroshnichenko	4	7^{7}	[4]
2	(Australia) O Gadecki (United States) D Hewitt	6	6^{5}	[10]

Final
(United States) A Blokhina (United States) A Markham	6	7^{7}
2	(Australia) O Gadecki (United States) D Hewitt	4	6^{1}
