= 2024 Knoxville Challenger – Doubles =

Doubles
- 2024 Knoxville Challenger

Final
- Champions: (Australia) Patrick Harper (United Kingdom) Johannus Monday
- Runners-up: (United States) Micah Braswell (United States) Eliot Spizzirri
- Score: 6–2, 6–2

Events
Singles	Doubles
- Knoxville Challenger

Cannon Kingsley and Luis David Martínez were the defending champions but chose not to defend their title.

Patrick Harper and Johannus Monday won the title after defeating Micah Braswell and Eliot Spizzirri 6–2, 6–2 in the final.

== Seeds ==
1. (United States) Ryan Seggerman / (United States) Patrik Trhac (quarterfinals)
2. (Brazil) Marcelo Demoliner / (United States) Christian Harrison (semifinals)
3. (Mexico) Hans Hach Verdugo / (Poland) Szymon Walków (semifinals)
4. (United States) Trey Hilderbrand / (United States) Alex Lawson (first round)

== Draw ==
Key

- Q = Qualifier
- WC = Wild card
- LL = Lucky loser
- Alt = Alternate
- ITF = ITF entry
- PR = Protected ranking
- SR = Special ranking
- SE = Special exempt
- JE = Junior exempt
- JR = Junior Accelerator Programme entrant
- CO = College Accelerator Programme entrant
- NG = Next Gen Accelerator Program entrant
- w/o = Walkover
- r = Retired
- d = Defaulted

=== Draw ===
First round
1	(United States) R Seggerman (United States) P Trhac	6^{4}	7	[10]
(Canada) C Harper (New Zealand) F Reynolds	7^{7}	5	[8]
WC	(United States) Alan Jesudason (Australia) James Newton	2	4
(Australia) P Harper (United Kingdom) J Monday	6	6
3	(Mexico) H Hach Verdugo (Poland) S Walków	7^{7}	6
(Colombia) N Mejía (Colombia) A Urrea	6^{5}	1
(Philippines) FC Alcantara (India) Sai Karteek Reddy Ganta	7^{7}	6^{4}	[6]
WC	(United States) A Mayo (United States) G Nanda	6^{3}	7^{7}	[10]
(United Kingdom) J Clarke (Canada) K Stevenson	3	5
(United States) B Holt (United States) M Krueger	6	7
Alt	(United States) Micah Braswell (United States) E Spizzirri	6	6
4	(United States) T Hilderbrand (United States) A Lawson	4	2
(United States) R Cash (United States) JJ Tracy	4	4
(United States) Andre Ilagan (United States) P Kumar	6	6
(Argentina) JP Ficovich (United States) Tennyson Whiting	3	1
2	(Brazil) M Demoliner (United States) C Harrison	6	6

Quarterfinals
1	(United States) R Seggerman (United States) P Trhac	6^{3}	6^{5}
(Australia) P Harper (United Kingdom) J Monday	7^{7}	7^{7}
3	(Mexico) H Hach Verdugo (Poland) S Walków	6	6
WC	(United States) A Mayo (United States) G Nanda	1	4
(United States) B Holt (United States) M Krueger	6^{4}	5
Alt	(United States) M Braswell (United States) E Spizzirri	7^{7}	7
(United States) A Ilagan (United States) P Kumar	2	6	[5]
2	(Brazil) M Demoliner (United States) C Harrison	6	3	[10]

Semifinals
(Australia) P Harper (United Kingdom) J Monday	6	7
3	(Mexico) H Hach Verdugo (Poland) S Walków	4	5
Alt	(United States) M Braswell (United States) E Spizzirri	4	7^{7}	[10]
2	(Brazil) M Demoliner (United States) C Harrison	6	6^{4}	[7]

Final
(Australia) P Harper (United Kingdom) J Monday	6	6
Alt	(United States) M Braswell (United States) E Spizzirri	2	2
