= 2023 Lexington Challenger – Women's singles =

Women's singles
- 2023 Lexington Challenger

Final
- Champion: (Mexico) Renata Zarazúa
- Runner-up: (United States) Caroline Dolehide
- Score: 1–6, 7–6^{(7–4)}, 7–5

Events
| Singles | men | women |
| Doubles | men | women |
- Lexington Challenger

Katie Swan was the defending champion but lost in the second round to Makenna Jones.

Renata Zarazúa won the title, defeating Caroline Dolehide in the final, 1–6, 7–6^{(7–4)}, 7–5.

== Seeds ==
1. (United States) Caroline Dolehide (final)
2. (United States) Madison Brengle (second round)
3. (Australia) Kimberly Birrell (quarterfinals)
4. (United States) Katie Volynets (second round)
5. (Australia) Olivia Gadecki (semifinals)
6. (United Kingdom) Katie Swan (second round)
7. (Japan) Mai Hontama (first round)
8. (China) Wang Yafan (semifinals)

== Draw ==
Key

- Q = Qualifier
- WC = Wild card
- LL = Lucky loser
- Alt = Alternate
- ITF = ITF entry
- PR = Protected ranking
- SR = Special ranking
- SE = Special exempt
- JE = Junior exempt
- JR = Junior Accelerator Programme entrant
- CO = College Accelerator Programme entrant
- NG = Next Gen Accelerator Program entrant
- w/o = Walkover
- r = Retired
- d = Defaulted

=== Finals ===
Semifinals
1 | (United States) Caroline Dolehide | 7^{7} | 6
8 | (China) Wang Yafan | 6^{1} | 4
5 | (Australia) Olivia Gadecki | 4 | 1
(Mexico) Renata Zarazúa | 6 | 6

Final
1 | (United States) Caroline Dolehide | 6 | 6^{4} | 5
(Mexico) Renata Zarazúa | 1 | 7^{7} | 7

=== Top half ===
First round
1 | (United States) C Dolehide | 4 | 7^{7} | 6
WC | (United States) D Hewitt | 6 | 6^{3} | 1
(United States) J Loeb | 5 | 3
Q | (United States) V Hu | 7 | 6
WC | (United States) E Eades | 0 | 1
(United States) M Jones | 6 | 6
Q | (United States) S Daavettila | 3 | 3
6 | (United Kingdom) K Swan | 6 | 6
3 | (Australia) K Birrell | 4 | 6 | 6
(United States) A Lahey | 6 | 4 | 1
Q | (United States) DJ Bennett | 4 | 3
Q | (United States) C Beck | 6 | 6
(Japan) K Okamura | 4 | 4
(Japan) M Uchijima | 6 | 6
(United States) S Chang | 4 | 2
8 | (China) Y Wang | 6 | 6

Second round
1 | (United States) C Dolehide | 6 | 6
Q | (United States) V Hu | 4 | 1
(United States) M Jones | 6 | 6
6 | (United Kingdom) K Swan | 2 | 3
3 | (Australia) K Birrell | 6 | 6
Q | (United States) C Beck | 2 | 3
(Japan) M Uchijima | 2 | 2
8 | (China) Y Wang | 6 | 6

Quarterfinals
1 | (United States) C Dolehide | 6 | 7^{7}
(United States) M Jones | 4 | 6^{4}
3 | (Australia) K Birrell | 5 | 6 | 1
8 | (China) Y Wang | 7 | 1 | 6

Semifinals
1 | (United States) C Dolehide | 7^{7} | 6
8 | (China) Y Wang | 6^{4} | 1

=== Bottom half ===
First round
5 | (Australia) O Gadecki | 7 | 6
WC | (United States) M Sieg | 5 | 3
(Mexico) M Zacarías | 6 | 6^{0} | 6
Q | (United States) C Rosca | 1 | 7^{7} | 3
(United States) W Osuigwe | 6 | 4 | 3
WC | (United States) M Kessler | 0 | 6 | 6
Q | (United States) G Min | 2 | 4
4 | (United States) K Volynets | 6 | 6
7 | (Japan) M Hontama | 4 | 6^{9}
Q | (United States) S Crawford | 6 | 7^{11}
Q | (United States) T Evans | 2 | 3
(Mexico) R Zarazúa | 6 | 6
(Japan) H Sakatsume | 6 | 5 | 6
(United States) R Anderson | 4 | 7 | 4
(United States) A Li | 1 | 2
2 | (United States) M Brengle | 6 | 6

Second round
5 | (Australia) O Gadecki | 6 | 3 | 6
(Mexico) M Zacarías | 4 | 6 | 4
WC | (United States) M Kessler | 6 | 6
4 | (United States) K Volynets | 0 | 3
Q | (United States) S Crawford | 2 | 4
(Mexico) R Zarazúa | 6 | 6
(Japan) H Sakatsume | 3 | 6 | 6
2 | (United States) M Brengle | 6 | 4 | 4

Quarterfinals
5 | (Australia) O Gadecki | 7 | 7^{7}
WC | (United States) M Kessler | 5 | 6^{4}
(Mexico) R Zarazúa | 6 | 6
(Japan) H Sakatsume | 2 | 2

Semifinals
5 | (Australia) O Gadecki | 4 | 1
(Mexico) R Zarazúa | 6 | 6
