= 2025 Lexington Open – Men's doubles =

Men's doubles
- 2025 Lexington Open

Final
- Champions: (India) Anirudh Chandrasekar (India) Ramkumar Ramanathan
- Runners-up: (Chinese Taipei) Hsu Yu-hsiou (Chinese Taipei) Huang Tsung-hao
- Score: 6–4, 6–4

Events
Singles	men	women
Doubles	men	women
- Lexington Open

André Göransson and Sem Verbeek were the defending champions but chose not to defend their title.

Anirudh Chandrasekar and Ramkumar Ramanathan won the title after defeating Hsu Yu-hsiou and Huang Tsung-hao 6–4, 6–4 in the final.

== Seeds ==
1. (United States) Trey Hilderbrand / (India) Jeevan Nedunchezhiyan (first round)
2. (India) Anirudh Chandrasekar / (India) Ramkumar Ramanathan (champions)
3. (New Zealand) Finn Reynolds / (New Zealand) James Watt (first round)
4. (Australia) Blake Bayldon / (Australia) Patrick Harper (quarterfinals)

== Draw ==
Key

- Q = Qualifier
- WC = Wild card
- LL = Lucky loser
- Alt = Alternate
- ITF = ITF entry
- PR = Protected ranking
- SR = Special ranking
- SE = Special exempt
- JE = Junior exempt
- JR = Junior Accelerator Programme entrant
- CO = College Accelerator Programme entrant
- NG = Next Gen Accelerator Program entrant
- w/o = Walkover
- r = Retired
- d = Defaulted

=== Draw ===
First round
1	(United States) T Hilderbrand (India) J Nedunchezhiyan	3	5
(Chinese Taipei) Y-h Hsu (Chinese Taipei) T-h Huang	6	7
(United States) M Cassone (United States) A Mayo	0	5
(United States) M Kiger (United States) Patrick Maloney	6	7
3	(New Zealand) F Reynolds (New Zealand) J Watt	6^{4}	3
(Lebanon) H Habib (United States) Andre Ilagan	7^{7}	6
WC	(United States) A Fenty (United States) B Kittay	7	7^{7}
(Japan) Ryuki Matsuda (Japan) N Tajima	5	6^{2}
(Canada) K Stevenson (Australia) B Tomic	2	2
(United States) P Kumar (Australia) K Pearson	6	6
(Antigua and Barbuda) J Maginley (Mexico) R Pacheco Méndez	3	3
4	(Australia) B Bayldon (Australia) P Harper	6	6
WC	(United States) Zachary Fuchs (United States) Wally Thayne	6	1	[10]
(United States) N Basavareddy (India) D Suresh	4	6	[7]
(Colombia) N Mejía (Colombia) C Rodríguez	3	2
2	(India) A Chandrasekar (India) R Ramanathan	6	6

Quarterfinals
(Chinese Taipei) Y-h Hsu (Chinese Taipei) T-h Huang	7	3	[10]
(United States) M Kiger (United States) P Maloney	5	6	[5]
(Lebanon) H Habib (United States) A Ilagan	7^{9}	7
WC	(United States) A Fenty (United States) B Kittay	6^{7}	5
(United States) P Kumar (Australia) K Pearson	7^{7}	6
4	(Australia) B Bayldon (Australia) P Harper	6^{2}	4
WC	(United States) Z Fuchs (United States) W Thayne	6^{5}	3
2	(India) A Chandrasekar (India) R Ramanathan	7^{7}	6

Semifinals
(Chinese Taipei) Y-h Hsu (Chinese Taipei) T-h Huang	6	6
(Lebanon) H Habib (United States) A Ilagan	4	3
(United States) P Kumar (Australia) K Pearson	6^{3}	6	[3]
2	(India) A Chandrasekar (India) R Ramanathan	7^{7}	4	[10]

Final
(Chinese Taipei) Y-h Hsu (Chinese Taipei) T-h Huang	4	4
2	(India) A Chandrasekar (India) R Ramanathan	6	6
