= 2025 Lexington Open – Women's singles =

Women's singles
- 2025 Lexington Open

Final
- Champion: (China) Wang Xiyu
- Runner-up: (Indonesia) Janice Tjen
- Score: 3–6, 6–2, 6–4

Events
Singles	men	women
Doubles	men	women
- Lexington Open

Wei Sijia was the defending champion but chose not to participate.

Wang Xiyu won the title, defeating Janice Tjen in the final, 3–6, 6–2, 6–4.

== Seeds ==
1. Anastasia Zakharova (second round)
2. (United States) Varvara Lepchenko (semifinals)
3. (France) Jessika Ponchet (quarterfinals)
4. (China) Wang Xiyu (champion)
5. (Netherlands) Arianne Hartono (withdrew)
6. (United States) Clervie Ngounoue (second round, withdrew)
7. (Indonesia) Janice Tjen (final)
8. (Brazil) Laura Pigossi (first round)

== Draw ==
Key

- Q = Qualifier
- WC = Wild card
- LL = Lucky loser
- Alt = Alternate
- ITF = ITF entry
- PR = Protected ranking
- SR = Special ranking
- SE = Special exempt
- JE = Junior exempt
- JR = Junior Accelerator Programme entrant
- CO = College Accelerator Programme entrant
- NG = Next Gen Accelerator Program entrant
- w/o = Walkover
- r = Retired
- d = Defaulted

=== Finals ===
Semifinals
Q	(United States) Fiona Crawley	3	2
7	(Indonesia) Janice Tjen	6	6
4	(China) Wang Xiyu	6	6
2	(United States) Varvara Lepchenko	4	3

Final
7	(Indonesia) Janice Tjen	6	2	4
4	(China) Wang Xiyu	3	6	6

=== Top half ===
First round
1	A Zakharova	2	6	6
WC	(United States) A Honer	6	3	1
Q	(United States) F Crawley	6	6
Q	(United States) E Cayetano	3	4
(United States) M Stoiana	4	3
WC	(United States) K Day	6	6
(Japan) H Sakatsume	6	6
8	(Brazil) L Pigossi	3	1
3	(France) J Ponchet	6	6
(Japan) M Yamaguchi	4	3
(China) Y Ma	6	1	6
(United States) A Rogers	4	6	0
(United States) H Inoue	6	4
(United States) R Anderson	4	0^{r}
(United States) H Chang	5	6	6^{2}
7	(Indonesia) J Tjen	7	4	7^{7}

Second round
1	A Zakharova	2	7	1
Q	(United States) F Crawley	6	5	6
WC	(United States) K Day	6	7^{7}
(Japan) H Sakatsume	4	6^{4}
3	(France) J Ponchet	6	3	6
(China) Y Ma	1	6	3
(United States) H Inoue	4	1
7	(Indonesia) J Tjen	6	6

Quarterfinals
Q	(United States) F Crawley	6	6
WC	(United States) K Day	4	2
3	(France) J Ponchet	4	2
7	(Indonesia) J Tjen	6	6

Semifinals
Q	(United States) F Crawley	3	2
7	(Indonesia) J Tjen	6	6

=== Bottom half ===
First round
LL	(United States) S Daavettila	3	6^{2}
Q	(United States) V Osuigwe	6	7^{7}
WC	(United States) V Hu	1	7	6
Q	(United States) K Scott	6	5	1
(India) S Yamalapalli	4	2
(United States) A Akli	6	6
(United States) E Kalieva	4	0
4	(China) Xiy Wang	6	6
6	(United States) C Ngounoue	7^{8}	5	6
WC	(United States) Z Hammond	6^{6}	7	2
Q	(United States) L Ma	6	6
SR	(United States) M Jones	0	3
Q	(Japan) S Imamura	4	6	6
Q	(United States) A Smith	6	3	4
Q	(United States) UM Arconada	4	4
2	(United States) V Lepchenko	6	6

Second round
Q	(United States) V Osuigwe	3	3
WC	(United States) V Hu	6	6
(United States) A Akli	6^{2}	6	2
4	(China) Xiy Wang	7^{7}	3	6
6	(United States) C Ngounoue
Q	(United States) L Ma	w/o
Q	(Japan) S Imamura	3	5
2	(United States) V Lepchenko	6	7

Quarterfinals
WC	(United States) V Hu	4	0
4	(China) Xiy Wang	6	6
Q	(United States) L Ma	2	2
2	(United States) V Lepchenko	6	6

Semifinals
4	(China) Xiy Wang	6	6
2	(United States) V Lepchenko	4	3
