= 2025 Brest Challenger – Doubles =

Doubles
- 2025 Brest Challenger

Final
- Champions: (Belgium) Sander Gillé (Netherlands) Sem Verbeek
- Runners-up: (France) Théo Arribagé (France) Albano Olivetti
- Score: 7–6^{(7–5)}, 7–6^{(7–4)}

Events
Singles	Doubles
← 2024 ·	Brest Challenger	· 2026 →

Nicolás Barrientos and Skander Mansouri were the defending champions but only Barrientos chose to defend his title, partnering Matěj Vocel. They lost in the semifinals to Sander Gillé and Sem Verbeek.

Gillé and Verbeek won the title after defeating Théo Arribagé and Albano Olivetti 7–6^{(7–5)}, 7–6^{(7–4)} in the final.

== Seeds ==
1. (Belgium) Sander Gillé / (Netherlands) Sem Verbeek (champions)
2. (France) Théo Arribagé / (France) Albano Olivetti (final)
3. (Ecuador) Diego Hidalgo / (United States) Patrik Trhac (first round)
4. (Colombia) Nicolás Barrientos / (Czech Republic) Matěj Vocel (semifinals)

== Draw ==
=== Key ===
- Q = Qualifier
- WC = Wild card
- LL = Lucky loser
- Alt = Alternate
- ITF = ITF entry
- PR = Protected ranking
- SR = Special ranking
- SE = Special exempt
- JE = Junior exempt
- JR = Junior Accelerator Programme entrant
- CO = College Accelerator Programme entrant
- NG = Next Gen Accelerator Program entrant
- w/o = Walkover
- r = Retired
- d = Defaulted

=== Draw ===
First round
1	(Belgium) S Gillé (Netherlands) S Verbeek	7^{8}	7^{7}
WC	(France) G Blancaneaux (France) C Hemery	6^{6}	6^{5}
(Poland) S Kielan (Poland) F Pieczonka	4	7	[8]
(Italy) F Maestrelli (Italy) F Passaro	6	5	[10]
4	(Colombia) N Barrientos (Czech Republic) M Vocel	6	6
PR	(Finland) E Ruusuvuori (Finland) O Virtanen	3	2
(United States) G Goldhoff (United States) T Winegar	7^{7}	6
(India) RC Bollipalli (India) A Kadhe	6^{2}	1
(United States) T Hilderbrand (United States) R Seggerman	6^{5}	4
WC	(France) A Reymond (France) L Sanchez	7^{7}	6
(United Kingdom) J Paris (United States) J Withrow	6^{5}	6	[10]
3	(Ecuador) D Hidalgo (United States) P Trhac	7^{7}	3	[7]
(Spain) S Martos Gornés (Spain) D Vega Hernández	7^{7}	1	[7]
(India) S Balaji (India) VS Prashanth	6^{3}	6	[10]
(Israel) D Cukierman (Ukraine) V Sachko	4	6	[6]
2	(France) T Arribagé (France) A Olivetti	6	3	[10]

Quarterfinals
1	(Belgium) S Gillé (Netherlands) S Verbeek	w/o
(Italy) F Maestrelli (Italy) F Passaro
4	(Colombia) N Barrientos (Czech Republic) M Vocel	5	6	[10]
(United States) G Goldhoff (United States) T Winegar	7	3	[8]
WC	(France) A Reymond (France) L Sanchez	7^{9}	6^{1}	[9]
(United Kingdom) J Paris (United States) J Withrow	6^{7}	7^{7}	[11]
(India) S Balaji (India) VS Prashanth	4	7^{7}	[8]
2	(France) T Arribagé (France) A Olivetti	6	6^{5}	[10]

Semifinals
1	(Belgium) S Gillé (Netherlands) S Verbeek	6	6^{2}	[10]
4	(Colombia) N Barrientos (Czech Republic) M Vocel	4	7^{7}	[7]
(United Kingdom) J Paris (United States) J Withrow	6^{4}	6^{13}
2	(France) T Arribagé (France) A Olivetti	7^{7}	7^{15}

Final
1	(Belgium) S Gillé (Netherlands) S Verbeek	7^{7}	7^{7}
2	(France) T Arribagé (France) A Olivetti	6^{5}	6^{4}
