= 2024 Lexington Challenger – Men's singles =

Men's singles
- 2024 Lexington Challenger

Final
- Champion: (Brazil) João Fonseca
- Runner-up: (Australia) Li Tu
- Score: 6–1, 6–4

Events
Singles	men	women
Doubles	men	women
- Lexington Challenger

Steve Johnson was the defending champion but didn't defend his title as he had retired from professional tennis.

João Fonseca won the title after defeating Li Tu 6–1, 6–4 in the final. The 2024 ATP Lexington Challenger was the first professional singles tournament won by João Fonseca in competitions organized by ATP.

In the title campaign, João Fonseca defeated two tennis players who played college tennis for the University of Kentucky and were very familiar with the tournament's courts. Both Canadians, Lian Draxl (2020 to 2023) and Gabriel Diallo (2019 to 2022). Due to weather conditions, João Fonseca had to deal with delays in the game schedules and needed to play two games in the same day. On Saturday, after going through the quarterfinals in the morning, Fonseca returned to the court in the late afternoon for the semifinal match. The final lasted 1 hour and 14 minutes. João Fonseca was the champion without losing a single set in the tournament.

== Seeds ==
1. (China) Bu Yunchaokete (withdrew)
2. (United States) Emilio Nava (quarterfinals)
3. (Canada) Gabriel Diallo (quarterfinals)
4. (Hong Kong) Coleman Wong (semifinals)
5. (France) Hugo Grenier (semifinals)
6. (Brazil) João Fonseca (champion)
7. (Australia) Li Tu (final)
8. (Australia) Bernard Tomic (second round, withdrew)
9. (United States) Brandon Holt (first round, retired)

== Draw ==
Key

- Q = Qualifier
- WC = Wild card
- LL = Lucky loser
- Alt = Alternate
- ITF = ITF entry
- PR = Protected ranking
- SR = Special ranking
- SE = Special exempt
- JE = Junior exempt
- JR = Junior Accelerator Programme entrant
- CO = College Accelerator Programme entrant
- NG = Next Gen Accelerator Program entrant
- w/o = Walkover
- r = Retired
- d = Defaulted

=== Finals ===
Semifinals
5	(France) Hugo Grenier	3	5
6	(Brazil) João Fonseca	6	7
4	(Hong Kong) Coleman Wong	2	3
7	(Australia) Li Tu	6	6

Final
6	(Brazil) João Fonseca	6	6
7	(Australia) Li Tu	1	4

=== Top half ===
First round
9	(United States) B Holt	3	0^{r}
(France) A Géa	6	1
(Japan) R Noguchi	4	1
WC	(United States) L Tien	6	6
(United States) A Mayo	5	7	3
Q	(United Kingdom) J Pinnington Jones	7	5	0^{r}
(United Kingdom) A McHugh	6	4	3
5	(France) H Grenier	2	6	6
3/SE	(Canada) G Diallo	7^{7}	3	6
Q	(United States) R Seggerman	6^{3}	6	1
Q	(Mexico) R Pacheco Méndez	6	1	2
(United States) E Quinn	2	6	6
(Canada) L Draxl	6	4	6
(Lithuania) R Berankis	4	6	2
(Japan) K Uchida	3	3
6	(Brazil) J Fonseca	6	6

Second round
(France) A Géa	6	6^{7}	0
WC	(United States) L Tien	4	7^{9}	6
(United States) A Mayo	3	6	0
5	(France) H Grenier	6	2	6
3/SE	(Canada) G Diallo	6	7^{8}
(United States) E Quinn	3	6^{6}
(Canada) L Draxl	6^{3}	5
6	(Brazil) J Fonseca	7^{7}	7

Quarterfinals
WC	(United States) L Tien	6	4	6^{7}
5	(France) H Grenier	2	6	7^{9}
3/SE	(Canada) G Diallo	2	2
6	(Brazil) J Fonseca	6	6

Semifinals
5	(France) H Grenier	3	5
6	(Brazil) J Fonseca	6	7

=== Bottom half ===
First round
8	(Australia) B Tomic	6	3	6
Q	(United States) S Kozlov	4	6	3
WC	(United States) B Kuzuhara	6^{4}	3
Q	(United States) Micah Braswell	7^{7}	6
LL	(Japan) Y Shimizu	6^{4}	6	6^{7}
(Ecuador) A Andrade	7^{7}	0	7^{9}
(Chile) M Soto	4	6	3
4	(Hong Kong) C Wong	6	3	6
7	(Australia) L Tu	1	6	6
WC	(Canada) T Baadi	6	2	4
Q	(Japan) J Trotter	6	6
(Chinese Taipei) T-l Wu	3	4
Alt	(United States) O Kumar	7	6
(United Kingdom) C Broom	5	3
(Australia) L Saville	3	2
2	(United States) E Nava	6	6

Second round
8	(Australia) B Tomic
Q	(United States) M Braswell	w/o
(Ecuador) A Andrade	6	1	2
4	(Hong Kong) C Wong	4	6	6
7	(Australia) L Tu	6	6
Q	(Japan) J Trotter	4	4
Alt	(United States) O Kumar	4	2
2	(United States) E Nava	6	6

Quarterfinals
Q	(United States) M Braswell	4	6^{3}
4	(Hong Kong) C Wong	6	7^{7}
7	(Australia) L Tu	7^{7}	6
2	(United States) E Nava	6^{5}	3

Semifinals
4	(Hong Kong) C Wong	2	3
7	(Australia) L Tu	6	6
