= 2024 Lexington Challenger – Women's doubles =

Women's doubles
- 2024 Lexington Challenger

Final
- Champions: (United States) Whitney Osuigwe (United States) Alana Smith
- Runners-up: (United States) Carmen Corley (United States) Ivana Corley
- Score: 7–6^{(7–5)}, 6–3

Events
| Singles | men | women |
| Doubles | men | women |
- Lexington Challenger

Alexis Blokhina and Ava Markham were the defending champions but chose not to participate.

Whitney Osuigwe and Alana Smith won the title, defeating Carmen and Ivana Corley in the final, 7–6^{(7–5)}, 6–3.

== Seeds ==
1. (Australia) Destanee Aiava / (United States) Dalayna Hewitt (first round)
2. (United States) Whitney Osuigwe / (United States) Alana Smith (champions)
3. (United States) Carmen Corley / (United States) Ivana Corley (final)
4. (Chinese Taipei) Liang En-shuo / (China) Ma Yexin (quarterfinals)

== Draw ==
Key

- Q = Qualifier
- WC = Wild card
- LL = Lucky loser
- Alt = Alternate
- ITF = ITF entry
- PR = Protected ranking
- SR = Special ranking
- SE = Special exempt
- JE = Junior exempt
- JR = Junior Accelerator Programme entrant
- CO = College Accelerator Programme entrant
- NG = Next Gen Accelerator Program entrant
- w/o = Walkover
- r = Retired
- d = Defaulted

First round
1 | (Australia) D Aiava (United States) D Hewitt | 3 | 4
(India) SR Bhamidipaty (Thailand) M Sawangkaew | 6 | 6
(Japan) K Okamura (Japan) H Sakatsume | 3 | 6^{9}
(United States) E Cayetano (United States) F Crawley | 6 | 7^{11}
3 | (United States) C Corley (United States) I Corley | 6 | 6
WC | (United States) E Eades (United States) Z Hammond | 1 | 4
(Brazil) I Gamarra Martins (United States) E Mandlik | 6^{7} | 6^{3}
(United States) J Failla (Japan) H Kuwata | 7^{9} | 7^{7}
(United States) V Flores (United States) J Loeb
WC | (United States) C Beckman (United States) E Stevens | w/o
(Chinese Taipei) C-y Hsu (United Kingdom) E Webley-Smith | 6^{2} | 6 | [7]
4 | (Chinese Taipei) E-s Liang (China) Y Ma | 7^{7} | 3 | [10]
(United Kingdom) T Moore (United Kingdom) E Silva | 0
(United States) UM Arconada (United States) K Scott | 1^{r}
(Canada) K Cross (United States) J Daniel | 4 | 3
2 | (United States) W Osuigwe (United States) A Smith | 6 | 6

Quarterfinals
(India) SR Bhamidipaty (Thailand) M Sawangkaew | 6 | 7^{7}
(United States) E Cayetano (United States) F Crawley | 2 | 6^{5}
3 | (United States) C Corley (United States) I Corley | 7 | 3 | [10]
(United States) J Failla (Japan) H Kuwata | 5 | 6 | [6]
WC | (United States) C Beckman (United States) E Stevens | 6 | 6
4 | (Chinese Taipei) E-s Liang (China) Y Ma | 2 | 1
(United Kingdom) T Moore (United Kingdom) E Silva | 2 | 4
2 | (United States) W Osuigwe (United States) A Smith | 6 | 6

Semifinals
(India) SR Bhamidipaty (Thailand) M Sawangkaew | 4 | 7^{7} | [3]
3 | (United States) C Corley (United States) I Corley | 6 | 6^{3} | [10]
WC | (United States) C Beckman (United States) E Stevens | 3 | 4
2 | (United States) W Osuigwe (United States) A Smith | 6 | 6

Final
3 | (United States) C Corley (United States) I Corley | 6^{5} | 3
2 | (United States) W Osuigwe (United States) A Smith | 7^{7} | 6
