= Tyler Zink =

American tennis player (born 2001)

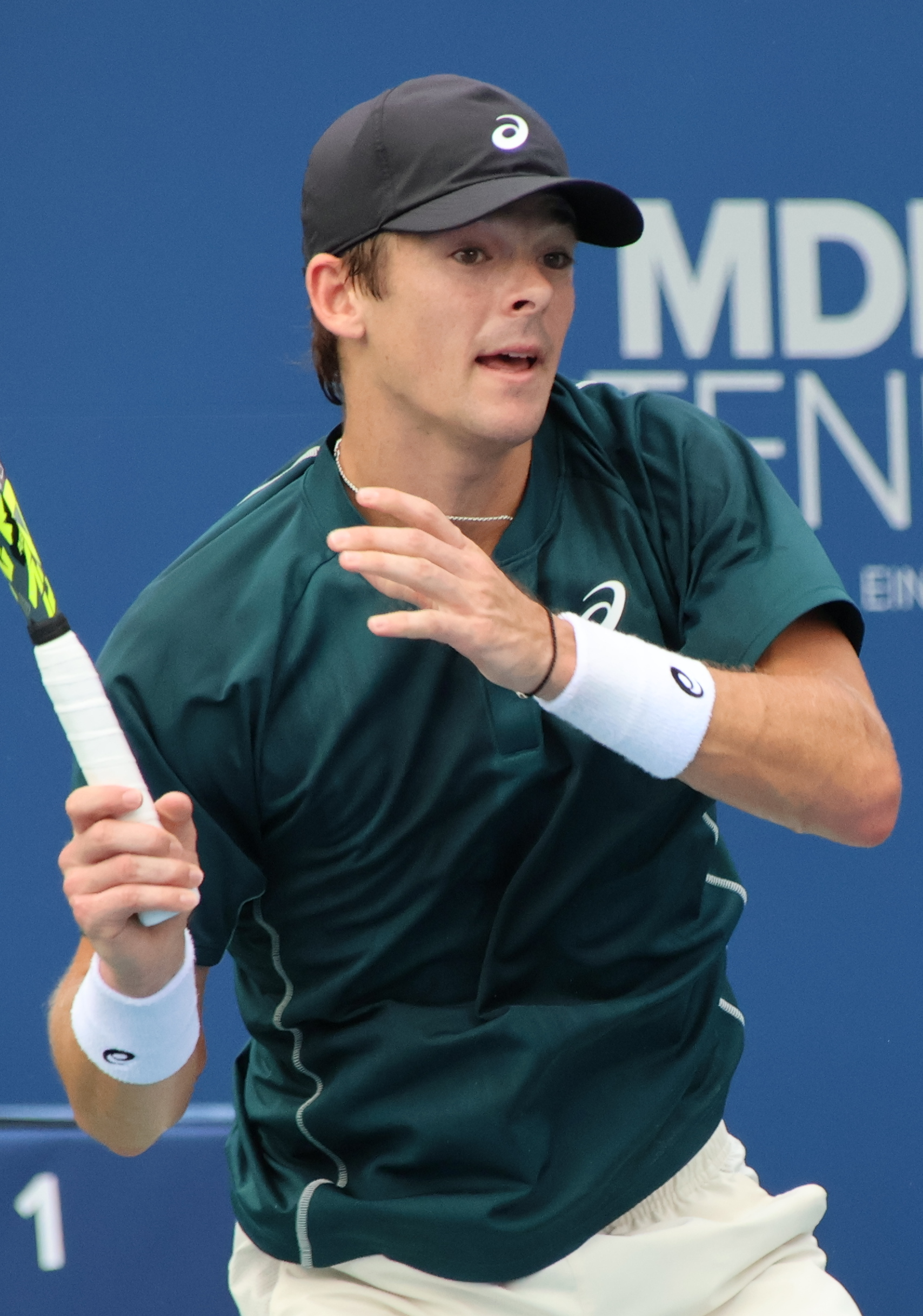
- Zink at the 2025 Washington Open
- Country (sports): United States
- Residence: Bradenton, Florida, U.S.
- Born: January 30, 2001 (age 25) Lancaster, Pennsylvania, U.S.
- Height: 6 ft 1 in (1.85 m)
- Plays: Right-handed (two-handed backhand)
- College: Georgia; Oklahoma State
- Prize money: US $211,549

Singles
- Career record: 0–0 (at ATP Tour level, Grand Slam level, and in Davis Cup)
- Career titles: 0
- Highest ranking: No. 278 (October 13, 2025)
- Current ranking: No. 400 (November 9, 2026)

Grand Slam singles results
- US Open: Q1 (2025)
- Australian Open Junior: 1R (2019)
- French Open Junior: 1R (2018, 2019)
- Wimbledon Junior: 1R (2018, 2019)
- US Open Junior: 1R (2018, 2019)

Doubles
- Career record: 0–2 (at ATP Tour level, Grand Slam level, and in Davis Cup)
- Career titles: 0; 2 Challengers
- Highest ranking: No. 232 (May 26, 2025)
- Current ranking: No. 443 (November 9, 2026)

Grand Slam doubles results
- US Open: 1R (2021, 2023)
- Australian Open Junior: 2R (2019)
- French Open Junior: 2R (2019)
- Wimbledon Junior: QF (2018)
- US Open Junior: W (2019)
- Last updated on: November 9, 2026.

Tyler Zink (born January 30, 2001) is an American tennis player. He has a career-high ATP singles ranking of world No. 278 achieved on 13 October 2025 and a doubles ranking of No. 232 achieved on 26 May 2025.

He played college tennis at Oklahoma State University.

== Career ==
Zink won the 2019 US Open – Boys' doubles title with Eliot Spizzirri.

Zink won the 2023 Lexington Challenger and the 2025 San Diego Open doubles titles with Eliot Spizzirri.

== ATP Challenger and ITF Tour finals ==
=== Singles: 6 (2 titles, 4 runner-ups) ===
Legend ATP Challenger Tour (0–1) ITF WTT (2–3)	Finals by surface Hard (0–3) Clay (2–1)

Result	W–L	Date	Tournament	Tier	Surface	Opponent	Score
Loss	0–1	Sep 2025	Tiburon Challenger, US	Challenger	Hard	(United States) Michael Zheng	4–6, 4–6

Result	W–L	Date	Tournament	Tier	Surface	Opponent	Score
Loss	0–1	Jul 2024	M15 Rochester, US	WTT	Clay	(United States) Alexander Bernard	3–6, 1–6
Loss	0–2	Aug 2024	M25 Southaven, US	WTT	Hard	(United States) Michael Zheng	4–6, 6–7^{(3–7)}
Win	1–2	Aug 2024	M15 Huntsville, US	WTT	Clay	(Japan) Leo Vithoontien	6–4, 6–1
Loss	1–3	Oct 2024	M25 Louisville, US	WTT	Hard	(United Kingdom) Johannus Monday	2–6, 3–6
Win	2–3	Apr 2025	M15 Orange Park, US	WTT	Clay	(United States) Tristan McCormick	6–3, 7–6^{(7–0)}

=== Doubles: 17 (14 titles, 3 runner-ups) ===
Legend ATP Challenger Tour (2–1) ITF WTT (12–2)	Finals by surface Hard (10–2) Clay (4–1)

Result	W–L	Date	Tournament	Tier	Surface	Partner	Opponents	Score
Win	1–0	Jul 2023	Lexington Challenger, US	Challenger	Hard	(United States) Eliot Spizzirri	(United States) George Goldhoff (United States) Vasil Kirkov	4–6, 6–3, [10–8]
Win	2–0	Feb 2025	San Diego Open, US	Challenger	Hard	(United States) Eliot Spizzirri	(Venezuela) Juan José Bianchi (United States) Noah Zamora	6–7^{(3–7)}, 7–6^{(7–4)}, [10–8]
Loss	2–1	Jul 2026	Winnipeg Challenger, Canada	Challenger	Hard	(United States) Joshua Sheehy	(United States) Daniel Milavsky (United States) Braden Shick	3–6, 6–3, [7–10]

Result	W–L	Date	Tournament	Tier	Surface	Partner	Opponents	Score
Win	1–0	Jun 2019	M15 Orlando, US	WTT	Clay	(United States) Trent Bryde	(Ecuador) Diego Hidalgo (Venezuela) Ricardo Rodríguez	7–6^{(7–1)}, 6–4
Win	2–0	Nov 2019	M15 Austin, US	WTT	Hard	(United States) Eliot Spizzirri	(United States) Ian Dempster (United States) Justin Butsch	4–6, 6–3, [10–7]
Win	3–0	Jul 2022	M25 Dallas, US	WTT	Hard	(United States) Govind Nanda	(Australia) Dane Sweeny (Chinese Taipei) Hsu Yu-hsiou	6–4, 6–4
Win	4–0	Jul 2022	M15 Waco, US	WTT	Hard	(United States) George Goldhoff	(United States) Mac Kiger (Canada) Benjamin Sigouin	4–6, 7–5, [10–7]
Win	5–0	Jul 2022	M15 Pittsburgh, US	WTT	Clay	(Canada) Cleeve Harper	(United States) Luke Phillips (United States) Nico Mostardi	6–7^{(3–7)}, 7–6^{(7–5)}, [10–6]
Win	6–0	Aug 2022	M25 Decatur, US	WTT	Hard	(United States) George Goldhoff	(Japan) Taisei Ichikawa (Japan) Seita Watanabe	6–3, 6–4
Loss	6–1	Aug 2022	M15 Cancún, Mexico	WTT	Hard	(Australia) Adam Walton	(Japan) Taisei Ichikawa (Japan) Seita Watanabe	6–1, 6–7^{(7–9)}, [8–10]
Win	7–1	Oct 2022	M15 Norman, US	WTT	Hard	(United States) George Goldhoff	(Belgium) Alessio Basile (United States) Aidan Kim	6–2, 6–1
Win	8–1	Nov 2022	M15 Fayetteville, US	WTT	Hard	(United States) George Goldhoff	(Denmark) Christian Sigsgaard (Denmark) Johannes Ingildsen	1–6, 6–4, [10–2]
Win	9–1	Jun 2023	M15 Kuršumlijska Banja, Serbia	WTT	Clay	(United States) William Grant	(Czech Republic) Hynek Bartoň (Switzerland) Patrick Schön	6–7^{(3–7)}, 6–4, [14–12]
Win	10–1	Jul 2023	M25 Dallas, US	WTT	Hard (i)	(United States) George Goldhoff	(Australia) Thomas Hulme (Argentina) Franco Ribero	4–6, 6–3, [10–8]
Loss	10–2	Jul 2023	M15 Pittsburgh, US	WTT	Clay	(United States) Patrick Maloney	(Barbados) Darian King (Antigua and Barbuda) Jody Maginley	4–6, 4–6
Win	11–2	Jul 2024	M15 Rochester, US	WTT	Clay	(United States) Alexander Bernard	(Australia) Lawrence Sciglitano (United States) Benjamin Kittay	7–6^{(7–0)}, 7–6^{(7–4)}
Win	12–2	Jul 2024	M25 Champaign, US	WTT	Hard	(Canada) Cleeve Harper	(United States) Preston Stearns (United States) Cannon Kingsley	6–4, 6–4

== Junior Grand Slam finals ==
=== Doubles: 1 (title) ===
Result	Year	Tournament	Surface	Partner	Opponents	Score
Win	2019	US Open	Hard	(United States) Eliot Spizzirri	(Czech Republic) Andrew Paulson (Belarus) Alexander Zgirovsky	7–6^{(7–4)}, 6–4
