= Eliot Spizzirri =

American tennis player (born 2001)

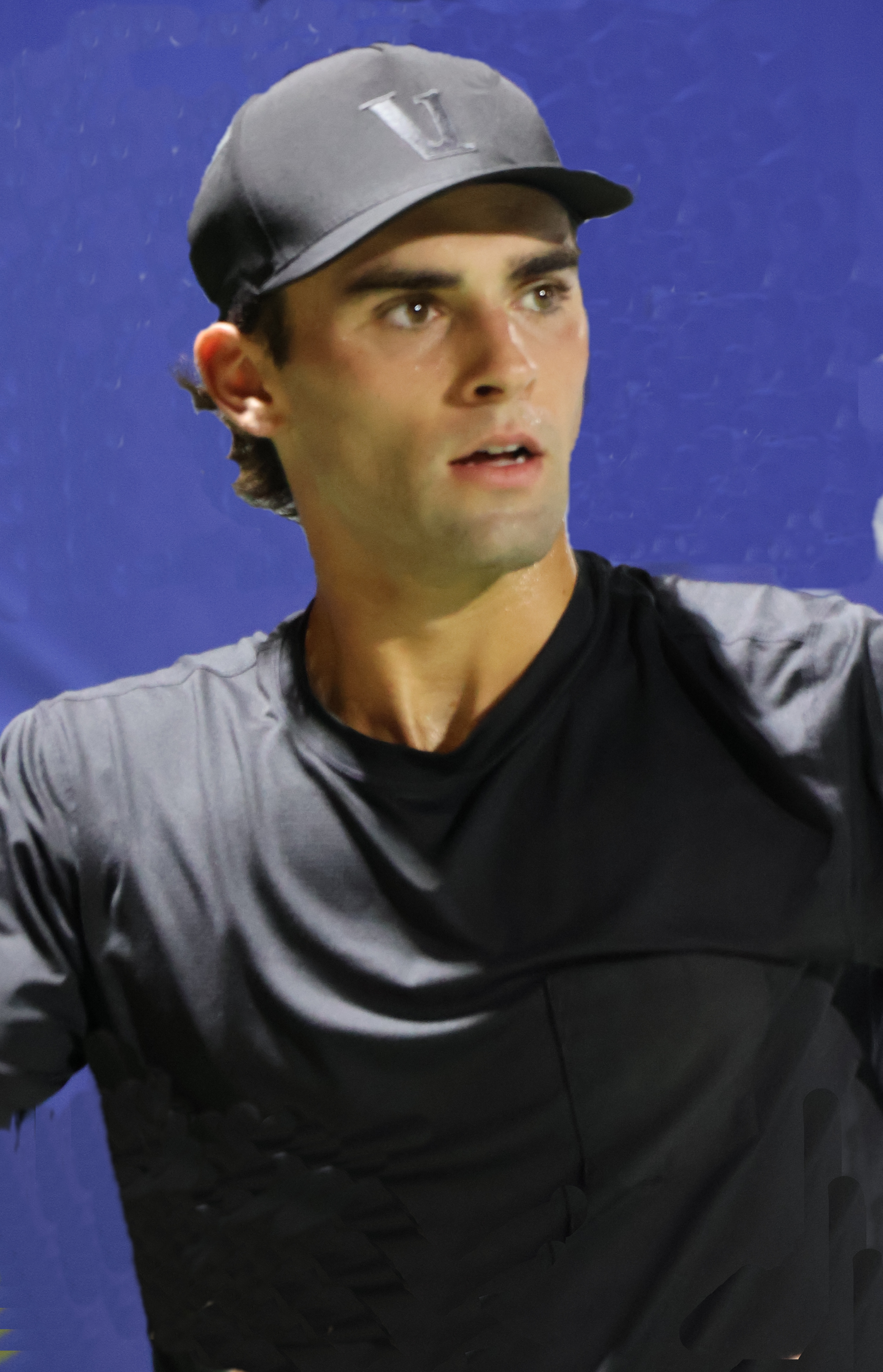
- Spizzirri at the 2023 Cary Challenger
- Country (sports): United States
- Born: December 23, 2001 (age 24) Greenwich, Connecticut, United States
- Height: 6 ft 1 in (1.85 m)
- Plays: Right-handed (two-handed backhand)
- College: University of Texas
- Coach: Chris Williams, Patrick Hirscht
- Prize money: US $1,198,979

Singles
- Career record: 11–11
- Career titles: 0
- Highest ranking: No. 67 (February 16, 2026)
- Current ranking: No. 112 (August 31, 2026)

Grand Slam singles results
- Australian Open: 3R (2026)
- French Open: 1R (2026)
- Wimbledon: Q2 (2025)
- US Open: 2R (2025)

Doubles
- Career record: 0–3
- Career titles: 0
- Highest ranking: No. 159 (June 9, 2025)
- Current ranking: —

Grand Slam doubles results
- US Open: 1R (2021, 2023)
- Last updated on: September 1, 2026.

Eliot Spizzirri (born December 23, 2001) is an American tennis player. Spizzirri has a career-high ATP singles ranking of world No. 67 which was achieved on February 16, 2026 and a doubles ranking of No. 159 which was achieved on June 9, 2025.

== Junior career ==
Spizzirri achieved a career-high ITF Junior Ranking of No. 20 on September 9, 2019. He played singles and doubles in all four 2019 junior Grand Slam events. Spizzirri reached the doubles round of 16 in all four junior majors and the singles round of 32 at the Australian Open. During his ITF junior career, Spizzirri secured five other ITF doubles titles and two singles titles from 2016 to 2018.

In 2017, Spizzirri won the 16s doubles title at the USTA Easter Bowl and Orange Bowl with Spencer Whitaker.

On November 18, 2018, Spizzirri won an ITF title in doubles at the Campeche, Mexico Grade 1 tournament.

Spizzirri was the No. 1 national tennis recruit in 2019.

== College years ==
Spizzirri played college tennis at the University of Texas, where in 2023 and 2024 he was the ITA National Player of the Year, one of only four college tennis players to finish as the top-ranked singles player twice since the ITA rankings began in 1981. In 2023, he was also the ITA Senior Player of the Year. Both years his ranking qualified him for the Accelerator Programme, an ATP/ITA collaboration to accelerate the professional development pathway for players in the American Collegiate system.

In both 2023 and 2024, Spizzirri was named to the College Sports Communicators (CSC) Academic All-American Men's Tennis Team, earning first-team honors both years and in 2024, he was named the Team Member of the Year, the organization's top honor for men's tennis. He finished the 2023 season as the No. 2 ITA Collegiate Doubles player with partner Cleeve Harper.

In October 2023, Spizzirri captured the singles title at the ITA Men's All-American Championships, becoming the third player from Texas to do so.

Spizzirri was a four-time ITA All-American in doubles and a three-time ITA All-American in singles. In the Big 12, he was a two-time Player of the Year, the first player in Texas history to win the award twice. The 2024 season was the fourth straight Spizzirri earned All-Big 12 recognition, having been on the first team in both singles and doubles in 2023, the second team in both in 2022 when he played through injury, and the first team in both in 2021. He set two Big 12 Player of the Week Award records, achieving the honor 5 times during a season, which he has done twice, and 11 times during his career.

== Professional career ==
=== 2021-2023: Grand Slam debut in doubles ===
In 2021, Spizzirri won the singles ITF Futures title in Decatur, Illinois and captured the doubles ITF Futures title in Champaign, Illinois, with Ben Shelton.

Spizzirri received a wildcard into the singles qualifying round of the 2021 US Open, where he defeated world No. 163 Alejandro Tabilo 5–7, 7–6, 6–3 in the first round. He also received a wildcard into the doubles main draw that year with Tyler Zink, where they lost in the first round.

Spizzirri competed in the ATP 2023 Lexington Challenger, winning the doubles championship with Tyler Zink with a defeat over George Goldhoff and Vasil Kirkov, and also reached the second round in singles.

He also received a wildcard into the singles qualifying round of the 2023 US Open, where he defeated No. 167 Matteo Gigante 6-4, 6-7 (3), 6-1 in the first round, No. 122 Aleksandar Kovacevic in the second round before he had to retire in the third set of the final round due to heat exhaustion in his match against No. 154 Emilio Nava. That year he also received a wildcard into the doubles main draw again with Tyler Zink, where they lost to French duo Adrian Mannarino (No. 35) and Arthur Rinderknech (No. 73).

=== 2024: First ATP win, Major and top 250 debuts ===
Spizzirri received a wildcard into the singles qualifying round of the 2024 Miami Open but lost to JJ Wolf in the first round.

Spizzirri won two ITF World Tennis titles, capturing the M25 Tulsa, USA in June and the M25 Laval, Canada in July. He also reached the finals of the M25 Wichita, USA, in June, losing to former Texas teammate Micah Braswell, as well as the double final with Cleeve Harper.

He recorded his first main draw ATP Tour win at the 2024 Hall of Fame Open over Li Tu as a wildcard.

Ranked No. 343, he made his singles Grand Slam debut at the 2024 US Open after qualifying for the main draw. Two months later, he made his top 250 debut on 14 October 2024, following his first ATP Challenger final in Tiburon.

=== 2025-2026: Masters, top 100 debuts, two ATP quarterfinals ===
Spizirri won his first ATP Challenger Tour title at the 2025 San Diego Open and reached a career-high ATP singles ranking of No. 144 on 3 March 2025. At the same tournament, he also won the doubles title partnering again with compatriot Tyler Zink.

Spizzirri made his Masters 1000 debut as a wildcard at the 2025 Miami Open and recorded his first Masters main draw win over Billy Harris.

Spizzirri received a wildcard for the 2025 US Open where he recorded his first major win. He made his top 100 debut on 27 October 2025 following a quarterfinal run at the BNP Paribas Fortis European Open, as a qualifier, and another Challenger final in Brest.

Spizzirri reached his second ATP quarterfinal also as a qualifier at the 2026 ASB Classic but lost to Fabian Marozsan in three sets.

In January 2026, at the Australian Open, Spizzirri surprisingly defeated favored João Fonseca in four sets, and also advanced to the third round to face #2 Jannik Sinner. Spizirri stunned expectations by winning the first set, but despite Sinner's poor physical condition due to the heat and cramps, he ultimately prevailed in four sets, although Spizzirri managed to take a break lead in both the third and fourth sets.

== Personal life ==
Spizzirri's twin brother, Nick, is a first-team All-American squash player at the University of Pennsylvania who finished 11th at the 2019 World Junior Squash Championships.

== Performance timeline ==
Key
W	F	SF	QF	#R	RR	Q#	DNQ	A	NH

(W) winner; (F) finalist; (SF) semifinalist; (QF) quarterfinalist; (#R) rounds 4, 3, 2, 1; (RR) round-robin stage; (Q#) qualification round; (DNQ) did not qualify; (A) absent; (NH) not held; (SR) strike rate (events won / competed); (W–L) win–loss record.

=== Singles ===
Tournament	2021	2022	2023	2024	2025	SR	W–L	Win%
Grand Slam tournaments
Australian Open	A	A	A	A	Q2	0 / 0	0–0	–
French Open	A	A	A	A	Q2	0 / 0	0–0	–
Wimbledon	A	A	A	A	Q2	0 / 0	0–0	–
US Open	Q2	A	Q3	1R	2R	0 / 2	1–2	33%
Win–loss	0–0	0–0	0–0	0–1	1–1	0 / 2	1–2	33%
ATP Masters 1000
Indian Wells Open	A	A	A	A	Q2	0 / 0	0–0	–
Miami Open	A	A	A	Q1	2R	0 / 1	1–1	50%
Monte-Carlo Masters	A	A	A	A	A	0 / 0	0–0	–
Madrid Open	A	A	A	A	A	0 / 0	0-0	–
Italian Open	A	A	A	A	Q1	0 / 0	0–0	–
Canadian Open	A	A	A	A	A	0 / 0	0–0	–
Cincinnati Open	A	A	A	A	Q1	0 / 0	0–0	–
Shanghai Masters	NH		A	A	Q2	0 / 0	0–0	–
Paris Masters	A	A	A	A	A	0 / 0	0–0	–
Win–loss	0–0	0–0	0–0	0–0	1–1	0 / 1	1–1	50%

== ATP Challenger and ITF World Tennis Tour finals ==
=== Singles: 9 (5 titles, 4 runner-ups) ===
Legend ATP Challenger Tour (2–3) ITF WTT (3–1)	Finals by surface Hard (5–4) Clay (0–0)

Result	W–L	Date	Tournament	Tier	Surface	Opponent	Score
Loss	0–1	Sep 2024	Tiburon Challenger, US	Challenger	Hard	(United States) Nishesh Basavareddy	1–6, 1–6
Loss	0–2	Jan 2025	Cleveland Open, US	Challenger	Hard (i)	(United States) Colton Smith	4–6, 7–6^{(8–6)}, 3–6
Win	1–2	Feb 2025	San Diego Open, US	Challenger	Hard	(United States) Mackenzie McDonald	6–4, 2–6, 6–4
Win	2–2	Sep 2025	Jingshan Tennis Open, China	Challenger	Hard	(Australia) Alex Bolt	6–4, 6–4
Loss	2–3	Oct 2025	Brest Challenger, France	Challenger	Hard (i)	(France) Hugo Gaston	6–2, 2–6, 1–6

Result	W–L	Date	Tournament	Tier	Surface	Opponent	Score
Win	1–0	Aug 2021	M25 Decatur, US	WTT	Hard	(United Kingdom) Aidan McHugh	6–2, 7–5
Loss	1–1	Jun 2024	M25 Wichita, US	WTT	Hard	(United States) Micah Braswell	4–6, 3–6
Win	2–1	Jun 2024	M25 Tulsa, US	WTT	Hard	(Australia) Bernard Tomic	6–4, 3–6, 7–6^{(7–3)}
Win	3–1	Jul 2024	M25 Laval, Canada	WTT	Hard	(United States) Karl Poling	6–4, 6–3

=== Doubles: 8 (5 titles, 3 runner-ups) ===
Legend ATP Challenger Tour (3–2) ITF WTT (2–1)	Finals by surface Hard (5–3) Clay (0–0)

Result	W–L	Date	Tournament	Tier	Surface	Partner	Opponents	Score
Win	1–0	Jul 2023	Lexington Challenger, US	Challenger	Hard	(United States) Tyler Zink	(United States) George Goldhoff (United States) Vasil Kirkov	4–6, 6–3, [10–8]
Loss	1–1	Sep 2024	Tiburon Challenger, US	Challenger	Hard	(United States) Patrick Kypson	(Australia) Luke Saville (Australia) Tristan Schoolkate	4–6, 2–6
Loss	1–2	Nov 2024	Knoxville Challenger, US	Challenger	Hard (i)	(United States) Micah Braswell	(Australia) Patrick Harper (United Kingdom) Johannus Monday	2–6, 2–6
Win	2–2	Jan 2025	Canberra Tennis International, Australia	Challenger	Hard	(United States) Ryan Seggerman	(France) Pierre-Hugues Herbert (Switzerland) Jérôme Kym	1–6, 7–5, [10–5]
Win	3–2	Feb 2025	San Diego Open, US	Challenger	Hard	(United States) Tyler Zink	(Venezuela) Juan José Bianchi (United States) Noah Zamora	6–7^{(3–7)}, 7–6^{(7–4)}, [10–8]

Result	W–L	Date	Tournament	Tier	Surface	Partner	Opponents	Score
Win	1–0	Nov 2019	M15 Austin, US	WTT	Hard	(United States) Tyler Zink	(United States) Ian Dempster (United States) Justin Butsch	4–6, 6–3, [10–7]
Win	2–0	Jul 2021	M25 Champaign, US	WTT	Hard	(United States) Ben Shelton	(South Korea) Chung Yun-seong (Japan) Rio Noguchi	6–4, 6–0
Loss	2–1	Jun 2024	M25 Wichita, US	WTT	Hard	(Canada) Cleeve Harper	(United States) Pranav Kumar (United States) Joshua Sheehy	7–6^{(7–4)}, 3–6, [8–10]

== Junior Grand Slam finals ==
=== Doubles: 1 (title) ===
Result	Year	Tournament	Surface	Partner	Opponents	Score
Win	2019	US Open	Hard	(United States) Tyler Zink	(Czech Republic) Andrew Paulson (Belarus) Alexander Zgirovsky	7–6^{(7–4)}, 6–4
