= 2013 Fifth Third Bank Tennis Championships – Men's singles =

Men's singles
- 2013 Fifth Third Bank Tennis Championships

Final
- Champion: (United Kingdom) James Ward
- Runner-up: (Australia) James Duckworth
- Score: 4–6, 6–3, 6–4

Events
Singles	men	women
Doubles	men	women
← 2012 ·	Fifth Third Bank Tennis Championships	· 2014 →

Denis Kudla was the defending champion, but chose not to compete.
James Ward defeated James Duckworth in the final.

== Seeds ==
1. (Ukraine) Illya Marchenko (quarterfinals)
2. (Belgium) Olivier Rochus (first round)
3. (Belgium) Ruben Bemelmans (second round)
4. (United States) Alex Kuznetsov (first round)
5. (United States) Bradley Klahn (semifinals)
6. (Australia) James Duckworth (final)
7. (Japan) Tatsuma Ito (quarterfinals)
8. (Tunisia) Malek Jaziri (quarterfinals)

== Draw ==
=== Key ===
- Q = Qualifier
- WC = Wild card
- LL = Lucky loser
- Alt = Alternate
- SE = Special exempt
- PR = Protected ranking
- ITF = ITF entry
- JE = Junior exempt
- w/o = Walkover
- r = Retired
- d = Defaulted
- SR = Special ranking

=== Finals ===
Semifinals
6	(Australia) James Duckworth	6	7
5	(United States) Bradley Klahn	4	5
WC	(Canada) Filip Peliwo	0	1
(United Kingdom) James Ward	6	6

Final
6	(Australia) James Duckworth	6	3	4
(United Kingdom) James Ward	4	6	6

=== Top half ===
First round
1	(Ukraine) I Marchenko	3	6	6
(Ukraine) D Molchanov	6	2	3
Q	(Australia) G Jones	5	6	6
(Japan) H Moriya	7	3	0
WC	(United States) E Quigley	6	6^{5}	1
(Canada) P Polansky	2	7^{7}	6
(Australia) M Barton	5	1
6	(Australia) J Duckworth	7	6
4	(United States) A Kuznetsov	2	6	5
(Republic of Ireland) J McGee	6	3	7
Q	(United States) T Sandgren	7	6
SE	(United States) A Krajicek	5	2
(Canada) S Diez	6	6
WC	(France) A Musialek	0	1
(Uzbekistan) F Dustov	3	2
5	(United States) B Klahn	6	6

Second round
1	(Ukraine) I Marchenko	6	6
Q	(Australia) G Jones	4	2
(Canada) P Polansky	3	6^{4}
6	(Australia) J Duckworth	6	7^{7}
(Republic of Ireland) J McGee	7^{7}	6^{6}	1
Q	(United States) T Sandgren	6^{4}	7^{8}	6
(Canada) S Diez	6^{8}	0
5	(United States) B Klahn	7^{10}	6

Quarterfinals
1	(Ukraine) I Marchenko	1	7	4
6	(Australia) J Duckworth	6	5	6
Q	(United States) T Sandgren	4	6	3
5	(United States) B Klahn	6	4	6

Semifinals
6	(Australia) J Duckworth	6	7
5	(United States) B Klahn	4	5

=== Bottom half ===
First round
8	(Tunisia) M Jaziri	6	6
(United Kingdom) D Evans	4	3
(Australia) A Feeney	6	5	0
Q	(Serbia) I Bozoljac	4	7	6
WC	(Canada) F Peliwo	7	6
(Australia) J-P Smith	5	4
SE	(Australia) B Mitchell	3	3
3	(Belgium) R Bemelmans	6	6
7	(Japan) T Ito	6	6
(Canada) F Dancevic	3	2
(Belgium) M Authom	6	4	6
Q	(United States) G Ouellette	0	6	4
WC	(United States) M Krueger	6	4	7
(Australia) M Reid	4	6	5
(United Kingdom) J Ward	6	6
2	(Belgium) O Rochus	2	3

Second round
8	(Tunisia) M Jaziri	6	6
Q	(Serbia) I Bozoljac	1	4
WC	(Canada) F Peliwo	6	6
3	(Belgium) R Bemelmans	3	3
7	(Japan) T Ito	7	6
(Belgium) M Authom	5	3
WC	(United States) M Krueger	0	1
(United Kingdom) J Ward	6	6

Quarterfinals
8	(Tunisia) M Jaziri	6	5	2
WC	(Canada) F Peliwo	4	7	6
7	(Japan) T Ito	6^{3}	6	4
(United Kingdom) J Ward	7^{7}	3	6

Semifinals
WC	(Canada) F Peliwo	0	1
(United Kingdom) J Ward	6	6
