= 2012 Fifth Third Bank Tennis Championships – Men's doubles =

Men's doubles
- 2012 Fifth Third Bank Tennis Championships

Final
- Champions: (United States) Austin Krajicek (Australia) John Peers
- Runners-up: (United States) Tennys Sandgren (United States) Rhyne Williams
- Score: 6–1, 7–6^{(7–4)}

Events
| Singles | men | women |
| Doubles | men | women |
| ← 2011 · | Fifth Third Bank Tennis Championships | · 2013 → |

Jordan Kerr and David Martin were the defending champions but decided not to participate.
Austin Krajicek and John Peers won the title, defeating Tennys Sandgren and Rhyne Williams 6–1, 7–6^{(7–4)} in the final.

== Seeds ==
1. (United States) Austin Krajicek / (Australia) John Peers (champions)
2. (Italy) Thomas Fabbiano / (Italy) Riccardo Ghedin (quarterfinals)
3. (United States) Vahid Mirzadeh / (United States) Maciek Sykut (semifinals)
4. (United States) Tennys Sandgren / (United States) Rhyne Williams (final)

== Draw ==
=== Key ===
- Q = Qualifier
- WC = Wild card
- LL = Lucky loser
- Alt = Alternate
- SE = Special exempt
- PR = Protected ranking
- ITF = ITF entry
- JE = Junior exempt
- w/o = Walkover
- r = Retired
- d = Defaulted
- SR = Special ranking

=== Draw ===
First round
1 | (United States) A Krajicek (Australia) J Peers | w/o
(Switzerland) Adrien Bossel (United States) M McClune
(Australia) G Jones (United States) Greg Ouellette | 6 | 6
WC | (United States) Phillip Arndt (United States) C Harrison | 3 | 2
3 | (United States) V Mirzadeh (United States) M Sykut | 6 | 6
(United States) J Cox (United States) D Kudla | 1 | 2
WC | (United States) Jarmere Jenkins (United States) Evan King | 6 | 6
(New Zealand) D King-Turner (France) G Sakharov | 4 | 2
(United States) D Kosakowski (United States) P Simmonds | 7^{7} | 6
WC | (United States) C Buchanan (United States) Eric Quigley | 6^{3} | 1
Alt | (Romania) C-I Gârd (Haiti) O Sajous | 6^{7} | 0
4 | (United States) T Sandgren (United States) R Williams | 7^{9} | 6
(Belgium) M Authom (France) Charles-Antoine Brézac | 6 | 6
(Australia) B Mitchell (Argentina) A Velotti | 3 | 1
(Australia) J Duckworth (Australia) M Reid
2 | (Italy) T Fabbiano (Italy) R Ghedin | w/o

Quarterfinals
1 | (United States) A Krajicek (Australia) J Peers | w/o
(Australia) G Jones (United States) Greg Ouellette
3 | (United States) V Mirzadeh (United States) M Sykut | 6 | 6
WC | (United States) Jarmere Jenkins (United States) Evan King | 4 | 1
(United States) D Kosakowski (United States) P Simmonds | 4 | 6 | [3]
4 | (United States) T Sandgren (United States) R Williams | 6 | 3 | [10]
(Belgium) M Authom (France) Charles-Antoine Brézac | 7 | 3 | [10]
2 | (Italy) T Fabbiano (Italy) R Ghedin | 5 | 6 | [3]

Semifinals
1 | (United States) A Krajicek (Australia) J Peers | 6 | 7^{7}
3 | (United States) V Mirzadeh (United States) M Sykut | 1 | 6^{4}
4 | (United States) T Sandgren (United States) R Williams | 6 | 7^{7}
(Belgium) M Authom (France) Charles-Antoine Brézac | 1 | 6^{4}

Final
1 | (United States) A Krajicek (Australia) J Peers | 6 | 7^{7}
4 | (United States) T Sandgren (United States) R Williams | 1 | 6^{4}
