= 2012 Fifth Third Bank Tennis Championships – Women's doubles =

Women's doubles
- 2012 Fifth Third Bank Tennis Championships

Final
- Champions: (Japan) Shuko Aoyama (China) Xu Yifan
- Runners-up: (Israel) Julia Glushko (Australia) Olivia Rogowska
- Score: 7–5, 6–7^{(4–7)}, [10–4]

Events
Singles	men	women
Doubles	men	women
- Fifth Third Bank Tennis Championships

Tamaryn Hendler and Chichi Scholl were the defending champions, but they did not partner up together. Hendler partnered with Alexandra Mueller while Scholl partnered up with Scholl. Hendler and Mueller lost in the first round, while Scholls lost in the quarterfinals.

Shuko Aoyama and Xu Yifan won the title, defeating Julia Glushko and Olivia Rogowska in the final, 7–5, 6–7^{(4–7)}, [10–4].

== Seeds ==
1. (Japan) Shuko Aoyama / (China) Xu Yifan (champions)
2. (Italy) Karin Knapp / (Japan) Erika Sema (first round)
3. (Australia) Bojana Bobusic / (Australia) Sally Peers (first round)
4. (Israel) Julia Glushko / (Australia) Olivia Rogowska (final)

== Draw ==
Key

- Q = Qualifier
- WC = Wild card
- LL = Lucky loser
- Alt = Alternate
- ITF = ITF entry
- PR = Protected ranking
- SR = Special ranking
- SE = Special exempt
- JE = Junior exempt
- JR = Junior Accelerator Programme entrant
- CO = College Accelerator Programme entrant
- NG = Next Gen Accelerator Program entrant
- w/o = Walkover
- r = Retired
- d = Defaulted

First round
1	(Japan) S Aoyama (China) Y Xu	6	6
(United Kingdom) J Konta (France) V Larrière	4	2
WC	(United States) K Frilling (United States) C Gullickson
(United States) Cha Scholl (United States) Chi Scholl	w/o
3	(Australia) B Bobusic (Australia) S Peers	6	6^{6}	[6]
(Japan) M Eguchi (Japan) M Miyamura	3	7^{8}	[10]
(United States) J Elie (Israel) K Shlomo	3	2
WC	(Canada) K Blajkevitch (United States) S Fox	6	6
(United States) E Clark (United States) S Krywacz	7^{7}	6
WC	(United States) M Kobelt (United States) N Robinson	6^{3}	3
(Belgium) T Hendler (United States) A Mueller	2	4
4	(Israel) J Glushko (Australia) O Rogowska	6	6
(United States) S Crawford (United States) M Keys	6	6^{4}	[7]
(United States) L Albanese (United States) A Will	1	7^{7}	[10]
(United States) M Burdette (United States) L Embree	7^{7}	6
2	(Italy) K Knapp (Japan) E Sema	6^{5}	2

Quarterfinals
1	(Japan) S Aoyama (China) Y Xu	6	6
(United States) Cha Scholl (United States) Chi Scholl	0	2
(Japan) M Eguchi (Japan) M Miyamura	6	6
WC	(Canada) K Blajkevitch (United States) S Fox	0	4
(United States) E Clark (United States) S Krywacz	2	5
4	(Israel) J Glushko (Australia) O Rogowska	6	7
(United States) L Albanese (United States) A Will	6^{3}	4
(United States) M Burdette (United States) L Embree	7^{7}	6

Semifinals
1	(Japan) S Aoyama (China) Y Xu	6	6
(Japan) M Eguchi (Japan) M Miyamura	4	4
4	(Israel) J Glushko (Australia) O Rogowska	7^{7}	6
(United States) M Burdette (United States) L Embree	6^{3}	3

Finals
1	(Japan) S Aoyama (China) Y Xu	7	6^{4}	[10]
4	(Israel) J Glushko (Australia) O Rogowska	5	7^{7}	[4]
