= 2012 Fifth Third Bank Tennis Championships =

- Date: 23–29 July
- Edition: 17th (men) / 15th (women)
- Surface: Hard
- Location: Lexington, Kentucky, United States

Champions

Men's singles
- (United States) Denis Kudla

Women's singles
- (Israel) Julia Glushko

Men's doubles
- (United States) Austin Krajicek / (Australia) John Peers

Women's doubles
- (Japan) Shuko Aoyama / (China) Xu Yifan
- Fifth Third Bank Tennis Championships

The 2012 Fifth Third Bank Tennis Championships was a professional tennis tournament played on outdoor hard courts. It was the 17th edition for men and the 15th edition for women, of the tournament and was part of the 2012 ITF Women's Circuit and the 2012 ATP Challenger Tour. It took place in Lexington, Kentucky, United States between 23 and 29 July 2012.

== ATP single main-draw entrants ==
=== Seeds ===
Country	Player	Rank^{1}	Seed
BEL	Maxime Authom	183	1
DOM	Víctor Estrella	192	2
FRA	Adrian Mannarino	197	3
USA	Denis Kudla	198	4
GBR	Jamie Baker	201	5
ARG	Agustín Velotti	205	6
AUS	James Duckworth	214	7
CAN	Érik Chvojka	225	8

- ^{1} Rankings are as of July 16, 2012.

=== Other entrants ===
The following players received wildcards into the singles main draw:

- (United States) Chase Buchanan
- (United States) Christian Harrison
- (United States) Daniel Kosakowski
- (United States) Eric Quigley

The following players received entry as a special exempt into the singles main draw:

- (Switzerland) Adrien Bossel
- (New Zealand) Daniel King-Turner

The following players received entry from the qualifying draw:

- (United States) Sekou Bangoura
- (Italy) Thomas Fabbiano
- (United States) Austin Krajicek
- (Japan) Toshihide Matsui

== WTA singles main-draw entrants ==
=== Seeds ===
Country	Player	Rank^{1}	Seed
AUS	Olivia Rogowska	119	1
JPN	Erika Sema	123	2
ITA	Karin Knapp	127	3
JPN	Misaki Doi	140	4
FRA	Irena Pavlovic	143	5
USA	Alison Riske	157	6
USA	Grace Min	169	7
USA	Madison Keys	175	8

- ^{1} Rankings are as of July 16, 2012.

=== Other entrants ===
The following players received wildcards into the singles main draw:

- (United States) Mallory Burdette
- (United States) Bethanie Mattek-Sands
- (United States) Shelby Rogers
- (United States) Alexandra Stevenson

The following players received entry from the qualifying draw:

- (United States) Jennifer Elie
- (United States) Lauren Embree
- (United States) Krista Hardebeck
- (United States) Ashley Weinhold

== Champions ==
=== Men's singles ===
- (United States) Denis Kudla def. (Canada) Érik Chvojka, 5–7, 7–5, 6–1

=== Women's singles ===
- (Israel) Julia Glushko def. (United Kingdom) Johanna Konta, 6–3, 6–0

=== Men's doubles ===
- (United States) Austin Krajicek / (Australia) John Peers def. (United States) Tennys Sandgren / (United States) Rhyne Williams, 6–1, 7–6^{(7–4)}

=== Women's doubles ===
- (Japan) Shuko Aoyama / (China) Xu Yifan def. (Israel) Julia Glushko / (Australia) Olivia Rogowska, 7–5, 6–7^{(4–7)}, [10–4]
