= 2012 Fifth Third Bank Tennis Championships – Women's singles =

Women's singles
- 2012 Fifth Third Bank Tennis Championships

Final
- Champion: (Israel) Julia Glushko
- Runner-up: (United Kingdom) Johanna Konta
- Score: 6–3, 6–0

Events
Singles	men	women
Doubles	men	women
- Fifth Third Bank Tennis Championships

The 2012 Fifth Third Bank Tennis Championships women's singles was a professional tennis tournament played on outdoor hard courts in Lexington, Kentucky, United States.

Chichi Scholl was the defending champion, but lost in the first round to Bethanie Mattek-Sands.

Julia Glushko won the title, defeating Johanna Konta in the final, 6–3, 6–0.

== Seeds ==
1. (Australia) Olivia Rogowska (first round)
2. (Japan) Erika Sema (first round)
3. (Italy) Karin Knapp (first round)
4. (Japan) Misaki Doi (semifinals)
5. (France) Irena Pavlovic (second round)
6. (United States) Alison Riske (first round)
7. (United States) Grace Min (first round)
8. (United States) Madison Keys (semifinals)

== Draw ==
Key

- Q = Qualifier
- WC = Wild card
- LL = Lucky loser
- Alt = Alternate
- ITF = ITF entry
- PR = Protected ranking
- SR = Special ranking
- SE = Special exempt
- JE = Junior exempt
- JR = Junior Accelerator Programme entrant
- CO = College Accelerator Programme entrant
- NG = Next Gen Accelerator Program entrant
- w/o = Walkover
- r = Retired
- d = Defaulted

=== Finals ===
Semifinals
8	(United States) Madison Keys	3	3
(Israel) Julia Glushko	6	6
4	(Japan) Misaki Doi	6	5	1
(United Kingdom) Johanna Konta	3	7	6

Final
(Israel) Julia Glushko	6	6
(United Kingdom) Johanna Konta	3	0

=== Top half ===
First round
1	(Australia) O Rogowska	3	4
WC	(United States) M Burdette	6	6
(United States) J Boserup	1	4
(United States) J Pegula	6	6
(Canada) H El Tabakh	1	4
(France) J Coin	6	6
Q	(United States) J Elie	4	3
8	(United States) M Keys	6	6
3	(Italy) K Knapp	7	3	5
(Belgium) T Hendler	5	6	7
(Israel) J Glushko	7^{7}	6
Q	(United States) K Hardebeck	6^{5}	3
(United States) C Scholl	4	6^{1}
WC	(United States) B Mattek-Sands	6	7^{7}
Q	(United States) L Embree	3	5
5	(France) I Pavlovic	6	7

Second round
WC	(United States) M Burdette	7	6
(United States) J Pegula	5	0
(France) J Coin	0	4
8	(United States) M Keys	6	6
(Belgium) T Hendler	6	1	2
(Israel) J Glushko	3	6	6
WC	(United States) B Mattek-Sands	6	7
5	(France) I Pavlovic	4	5

Quarterfinals
WC	(United States) M Burdette	3	0
8	(United States) M Keys	6	6
(Israel) J Glushko	6	6
WC	(United States) B Mattek-Sands	2	0

Semifinals
8	(United States) M Keys	3	3
(Israel) J Glushko	6	6

=== Bottom half ===
First round
6	(United States) A Riske	6	3	0
(China) Y Xu	4	6	6
(Chile) A Koch Benvenuto	3	4
(Australia) B Bobusic	6	6
Q	(United States) A Weinhold	6	6
(Japan) M Eguchi	2	1
(Australia) I Holland	1	0
4	(Japan) M Doi	6	6
7	(United States) G Min	7^{9}	5	0
WC	(United States) S Rogers	6^{7}	7	6
(Japan) A Nakamura	6	1	6
(France) V Larrière	2	6	3
WC	(United States) A Stevenson	4	5
PR	(United States) L Albanese	6	7
(United Kingdom) J Konta	1	6	7^{7}
2	(Japan) E Sema	6	4	6^{1}

Second round
(China) Y Xu	1	6^{7}
(Australia) B Bobusic	6	7^{9}
Q	(United States) A Weinhold	5	1
4	(Japan) M Doi	7	6
WC	(United States) S Rogers	7	7
(Japan) A Nakamura	5	3
PR	(United States) L Albanese	1	6	5
(United Kingdom) J Konta	6	1	7

Quarterfinals
(Australia) B Bobusic	4	0
4	(Japan) M Doi	6	6
WC	(United States) S Rogers	4	2
(United Kingdom) J Konta	6	6

Semifinals
4	(Japan) M Doi	6	5	1
(United Kingdom) J Konta	3	7	6
