= 2013 Fifth Third Bank Tennis Championships =

- Date: July 22–28
- Edition: 18th (men) / 16th (women)
- Draw: 32S / 16D
- Prize money: $50,000
- Surface: Hard
- Location: Lexington, Kentucky, United States

Champions

Men's singles
- (United Kingdom) James Ward

Women's singles
- (United States) Shelby Rogers

Men's doubles
- (Canada) Frank Dancevic / (Canada) Peter Polansky

Women's doubles
- (Thailand) Nicha Lertpitaksinchai / (Thailand) Peangtarn Plipuech
- Fifth Third Bank Tennis Championships

The 2013 Fifth Third Bank Tennis Championships was a professional tennis tournament played on outdoor hard courts. It was the 18th edition for men and the 16th edition for women of the tournament and was part of the 2013 ITF Women's Circuit and the 2013 ATP Challenger Tour, offering prize money of $50,000 each for the men's and women's events. It took place in Lexington, Kentucky, United States, on July 22–28, 2013.

== ATP singles main draw entrants ==
=== Seeds ===
Country	Player	Rank^{1}	Seed
UKR	Illya Marchenko	118	1
BEL	Olivier Rochus	148	2
BEL	Ruben Bemelmans	153	3
USA	Alex Kuznetsov	157	4
USA	Bradley Klahn	161	5
AUS	James Duckworth	164	6
JPN	Tatsuma Ito	174	7
TUN	Malek Jaziri	177	8

- As of July 15, 2013

=== Other entrants ===
The following players received wildcards into the singles main draw:

- (United States) Eric Quigley
- (France) Alexis Musialek
- (Canada) Filip Peliwo
- (United States) Mitchell Krueger

The following players received entry by a special exempt:

- (United States) Austin Krajicek
- (Australia) Benjamin Mitchell

The following players received entry from the qualifying draw:

- (Australia) Greg Jones
- (United States) Greg Ouellette
- (United States) Tennys Sandgren
- (Serbia) Ilija Bozoljac

== WTA singles main draw entrants ==
=== Seeds ===
Country	Player	Rank^{1}	Seed
JPN	Misaki Doi	95	1
ISR	Julia Glushko	113	2
JPN	Kurumi Nara	125	3
USA	Shelby Rogers	154	4
CAN	Stéphanie Dubois	158	5
USA	Grace Min	162	6
USA	Irina Falconi	164	7
RSA	Chanel Simmonds	171	8

- ^{1} Rankings as of July 15, 2013

=== Other entrants ===
The following players received wildcards into the singles main draw:

- (United States) Stephanie Kent
- (United States) Jamie Loeb
- (United States) Grace Min

The following players received entry from the qualifying draw:

- (United States) Jennifer Brady
- (United States) Lauren Embree
- (Japan) Mari Osaka
- (Japan) Naomi Osaka

The following player received entry by a lucky loser spot:

- (Russia) Yana Koroleva
- (United States) Alexandra Mueller

== Champions ==
=== Men's singles ===
- (United Kingdom) James Ward def. (Australia) James Duckworth 4–6, 6–3, 6–4

=== Women's singles ===
- (United States) Shelby Rogers def. (France) Julie Coin 6–4, 7–6^{(7–3)}

=== Men's doubles ===
- (Canada) Frank Dancevic / (Canada) Peter Polansky vs. (United States) Bradley Klahn / (New Zealand) Michael Venus 7–5, 6–3

=== Women's doubles ===
- (Thailand) Nicha Lertpitaksinchai / (Thailand) Peangtarn Plipuech def. (Israel) Julia Glushko / (South Africa) Chanel Simmonds 7–6^{(7–5)}, 6–3
