= 2013 Fifth Third Bank Tennis Championships – Men's doubles =

Men's doubles
- 2013 Fifth Third Bank Tennis Championships

Final
- Champions: (Canada) Frank Dancevic (Canada) Peter Polansky
- Runners-up: (United States) Bradley Klahn (New Zealand) Michael Venus
- Score: 7–5, 6–3

Events
Singles	men	women
Doubles	men	women
- Fifth Third Bank Tennis Championships

Austin Krajicek and John Peers were the defending champions, but Peers chose not to compete.
Krajicek paired with Mitchell Krueger but lost in the semifinals to eventual finalists Bradley Klahn and Michael Venus.
Frank Dancevic and Peter Polansky won the title 7–5, 6–3.

== Seeds ==
1. (India) Purav Raja / (India) Divij Sharan (first round)
2. (Australia) Adam Feeney / (Australia) Matt Reid (first round)
3. (Belgium) Maxime Authom / (Belgium) Ruben Bemelmans (semifinals)
4. (United States) Bradley Klahn / (New Zealand) Michael Venus (final)

== Draw ==
Key

- Q = Qualifier
- WC = Wild card
- LL = Lucky loser
- Alt = Alternate
- ITF = ITF entry
- PR = Protected ranking
- SR = Special ranking
- SE = Special exempt
- JE = Junior exempt
- JR = Junior Accelerator Programme entrant
- CO = College Accelerator Programme entrant
- NG = Next Gen Accelerator Program entrant
- w/o = Walkover
- r = Retired
- d = Defaulted

First round
1	(India) P Raja (India) D Sharan	4	7^{10}	[5]
(United Kingdom) D Evans (United Kingdom) J Ward	6	6^{8}	[10]
WC	(United States) D Novikov (United States) Mi Redlicki	3	6^{5}
(United States) A Krajicek (United States) M Krueger	6	7^{7}
4	(United States) B Klahn (New Zealand) M Venus	7^{7}	6
(Australia) M Barton (Australia) B Mitchell	6^{4}	2
(France) C Reix (Belgium) O Rochus	7	6
WC	(United States) S Bangoura (United States) Beck Pennington	5	2
(Uzbekistan) F Dustov (Tunisia) M Jaziri	w/o
WC	(United States) Mark Ein (United States) E Quigley
(Japan) T Ito (Japan) H Kondo	2	1
3	(Belgium) M Authom (Belgium) R Bemelmans	6	6
(Canada) F Dancevic (Canada) P Polansky	6	6
(Ukraine) I Marchenko (Ukraine) D Molchanov	2	2
(South Africa) R Roelofse (India) S Singh	7	1	[10]
2	(Australia) A Feeney (Australia) M Reid	5	6	[7]

Quarterfinals
(United Kingdom) D Evans (United Kingdom) J Ward	4	4
(United States) A Krajicek (United States) M Krueger	6	6
4	(United States) B Klahn (New Zealand) M Venus	7	6
(France) C Reix (Belgium) O Rochus	5	3
(Uzbekistan) F Dustov (Tunisia) M Jaziri	4	2
3	(Belgium) M Authom (Belgium) R Bemelmans	6	6
(Canada) F Dancevic (Canada) P Polansky	6	6
(South Africa) R Roelofse (India) S Singh	3	4

Semifinals
(United States) A Krajicek (United States) M Krueger	4	5
4	(United States) B Klahn (New Zealand) M Venus	6	7
3	(Belgium) M Authom (Belgium) R Bemelmans	4	6	[4]
(Canada) F Dancevic (Canada) P Polansky	6	4	[10]

Final
4	(United States) B Klahn (New Zealand) M Venus	5	3
(Canada) F Dancevic (Canada) P Polansky	7	6
