= 2012 US Open (tennis) =

- Date: August 27 – September 10
- Edition: 132nd
- Category: Grand Slam (ITF)
- Surface: Hardcourt
- Location: New York City, U.S.
- Venue: USTA Billie Jean King National Tennis Center

Champions

Men's singles
- (United Kingdom) Andy Murray

Women's singles
- (United States) Serena Williams

Men's doubles
- (United States) Bob Bryan / (United States) Mike Bryan

Women's doubles
- (Italy) Sara Errani / (Italy) Roberta Vinci

Mixed doubles
- (Russia) Ekaterina Makarova / (Brazil) Bruno Soares

Boys' singles
- (Canada) Filip Peliwo

Girls' singles
- (United States) Samantha Crawford

Boys' doubles
- (United Kingdom) Kyle Edmund / (Portugal) Frederico Ferreira Silva

Girls' doubles
- (United States) Gabrielle Andrews / (United States) Taylor Townsend
- US Open

The 2012 US Open was a tennis tournament played on the outdoor hard courts at the USTA Billie Jean King National Tennis Center in Flushing Meadows Park, of Queens, New York City, United States. It was played from August 27 to September 10. As a result of adverse weather conditions on September 8, which included a full evacuation of the National Tennis Center because of an upcoming tornado, another day was added to the schedule for the fifth straight year, with the women's final postponed to the afternoon of Sunday, September 9 rather than the previous evening, the men's semi-final between Novak Djokovic and David Ferrer suspended on September 8 and completed on September 9, and the men's final postponed to the afternoon of Monday, September 10.

Djokovic and Samantha Stosur were the defending men's and women's singles champions, respectively. Both were unsuccessful in their title defenses; Stosur being narrowly defeated by World No. 1 Victoria Azarenka in the quarter-finals, and Djokovic defeated in the final by Andy Murray. Murray became the first British man since Fred Perry in 1936 to win a Grand Slam singles title, and the first man to win both the US Open and the Olympic men's singles gold medal in the same year. In the women's draw, Serena Williams won her fourth US Open title, and first since 2008, by defeating Victoria Azarenka in the final.

== Notable events ==
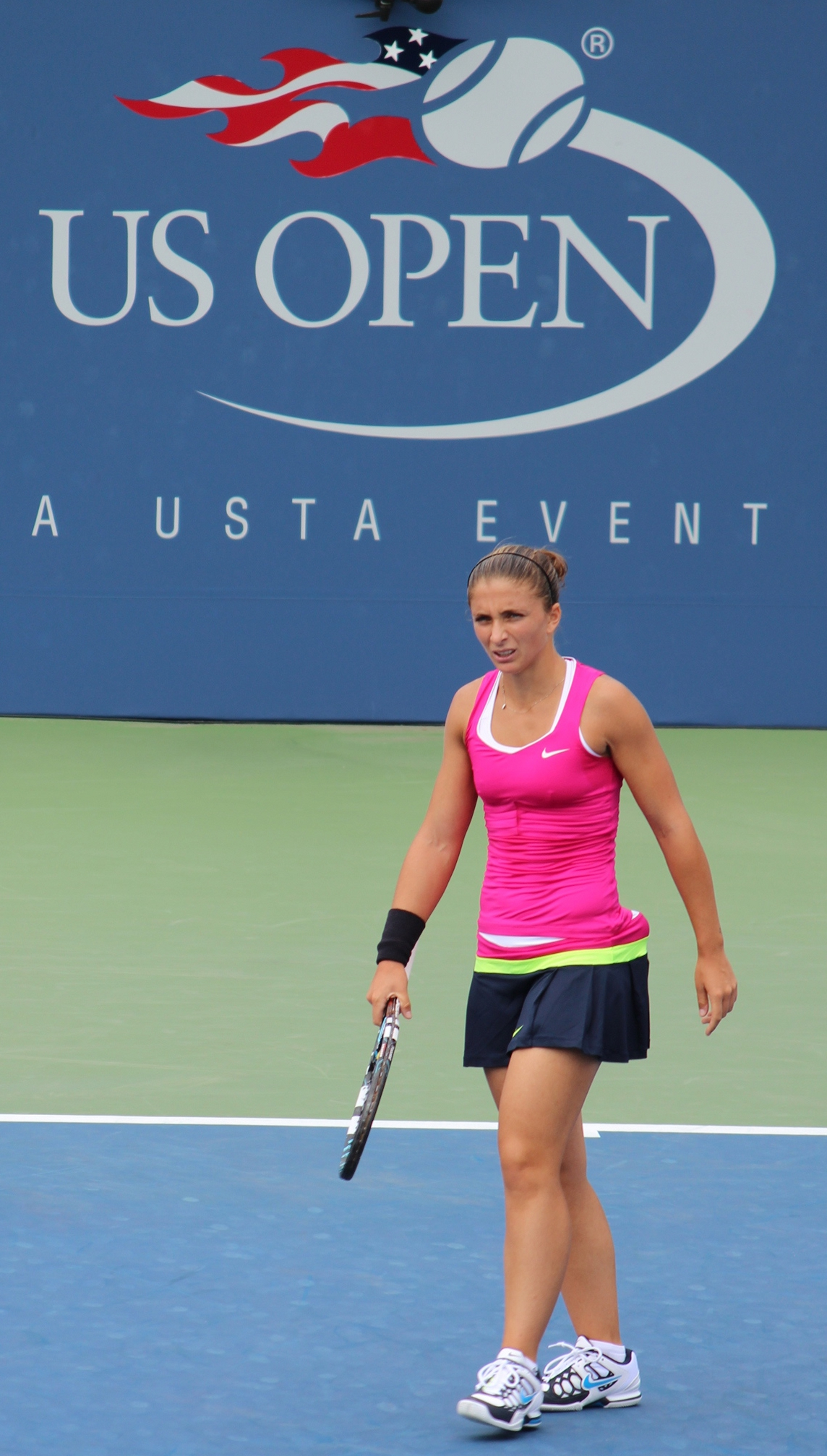
Sara Errani – Winner of Women's Doubles and Semifinalist of Women's Singles

- 2010 champion and 2011 finalist Rafael Nadal withdrew from the tournament because of a knee injury.
- 2010 finalist Vera Zvonareva also withdrew from the tournament due to illness.
- Two former World No. 1s and US Open champions ended their careers after this year's US Open. Three-time women's champion Kim Clijsters suffered her first defeat at Flushing Meadows since losing the 2003 final to her compatriot and rival Justine Henin, when she was defeated in the second round by Laura Robson. This loss marked the end of Clijsters' singles career. American Andy Roddick, who won in 2003, retired from professional tennis with his loss against 2009 champion Juan Martín del Potro in the fourth round.
- Robson followed up her upset of Clijsters with a third round victory against Li Na, making the fourth round of a Grand Slam tournament for the first time, and this was also the first British woman to reach the fourth round in any Grand Slam since Samantha Smith did so in 1998 Wimbledon.
- On September 3, John Isner and Philipp Kohlschreiber finished play at 2:26 am, tying the 1993 Mats Wilander/Mikael Pernfors record for the latest-ever finish to a matchday at the tournament.
- Serena Williams won 23 consecutive games from 4–4 in the first set against Ekaterina Makarova in the third round through to 3–0 in the first set against Ana Ivanovic in the quarter-finals.
- After 17 consecutive Grand Slam tournaments without a quarter-final appearance, Ivanovic reached that stage for the first time since winning the 2008 French Open.
- Ivanovic, Marion Bartoli and Roberta Vinci all advanced to the US Open quarter-finals for the first time. For Vinci, this was her first Grand Slam quarter-final, eleven years and 31 Grand Slam tournaments after debuting at the 2001 US Open.
- Maria Sharapova returned to the semi-finals for the first time since 2006, and Sara Errani advanced to her first ever US Open semi-final.
- Serena Williams advanced to her second straight US Open final, and her sixth overall. She defeated Victoria Azarenka in the first three-set final to be decided since 1995.
- In the men's draw, Tomáš Berdych advanced to his first US Open quarter-final by virtue of his three-set win against Nicolás Almagro in the fourth round. He then advanced to the semi-finals after upsetting five-time US Open champion Roger Federer in the quarter-finals.
  - With Federer's defeat, this meant that for the first time since the 2004 French Open, neither Federer nor Nadal featured in a Grand Slam semi-final.
- With their victory in the men's doubles final, Bob and Mike Bryan took sole possession of the Open-era record for most Grand Slam men's doubles titles. Their 12th Grand Slam title took them past The Woodies (Todd Woodbridge and Mark Woodforde). The win was also their fourth at the US Open, tying the Open-era record of Bob Lutz and Stan Smith.
- The women's final between Victoria Azarenka and Serena Williams was postponed to Sunday, due to inclement weather, for the fourth time in five years.
- The second men's semi-final between David Ferrer and Novak Djokovic was also postponed to Sunday, also due to inclement weather, with the men's final to be played on Monday for the fifth year in a row.
- Andy Murray became the first British winner of a Grand Slam singles title since 1977, and the first British man to do so since 1936, by defeating the defending champion Djokovic in the final. Lasting 4:54, it was the equal-longest US Open final by duration in history, and the equal-second longest Grand Slam final in the Open Era, only behind the 2012 Australian Open final.
- For the first time since 2003, the four Grand Slam Men's Singles titles were won by different players.

== Points and prize money ==
=== Point distribution ===
Below is a series of tables for each of the competitions showing the ranking points on offer for each event.

==== Seniors points ====
Event	W	F	SF	QF	Round of 16	Round of 32	Round of 64	Round of 128	Q	Q3	Q2	Q1
Men's singles	2000	1200	720	360	180	90	45	10	25	16	8	0
Men's doubles	2000	1200	720	360	180	90	0	–	25	–	–	–
Women's singles	2000	1400	900	500	280	160	100	5	60	50	40	2
Women's doubles	2000	1400	900	500	280	160	5	–	60	–	–	–

==== Junior points ====
Event	W	F	SF	QF	Round of 16	Round of 32	Q	Q3
Boys' singles	250	180	120	80	50	30	25	20
Girls' singles	250	180	120	80	50	30	25	20
Boys' doubles	180	120	80	50	30	—		
Girls' doubles	180	120	80	50	30	—		

=== Prize money ===
Event	W	F	SF	QF	Round of 16	Round of 32	Round of 64	Round of 128	Q3	Q2	Q1
Singles	$1,900,000	$950,000	$475,000	$237,500	$120,000	$65,000	$37,000	$23,000	$8,638	$5,775	$3,000
Doubles *	$420,000	$210,000	$105,000	$50,000	$26,000	$16,000	$11,000	–	–	–	–
Mixed doubles *	$150,000	$70,000	$30,000	$15,000	$10,000	$5,000	–	–	–	–	–

_{* per team}

=== Bonus prize money ===
2012 Olympus US Open Series Finish
2012 US Open Finish	W	F	SF	QF	Round of 16	Round of 32	Round of 64	Round of 128	Awardees	
1st place	$1,000,000	$500,000	$250,000	$125,000	$70,000	$40,000	$25,000	$15,000	(Serbia) Novak Djokovic	$500,000
1st place	$1,000,000	$500,000	$250,000	$125,000	$70,000	$40,000	$25,000	$15,000	(Czech Republic) Petra Kvitová	$70,000
2nd place	$500,000	$250,000	$125,000	$62,500	$35,000	$20,000	$12,500	$7,500	(United States) John Isner	$20,000
2nd place	$500,000	$250,000	$125,000	$62,500	$35,000	$20,000	$12,500	$7,500	(China) Li Na	$20,000
3rd place	$250,000	$125,000	$62,500	$31,250	$17,500	$10,000	$6,250	$3,750	(United States) Sam Querrey	$10,000
3rd place	$250,000	$125,000	$62,500	$31,250	$17,500	$10,000	$6,250	$3,750	(Slovakia) Dominika Cibulková	$10,000

== Singles players ==
Men's singles

Champion		Runner-up	
(United Kingdom) Andy Murray [3]		(Serbia) Novak Djokovic [2]	
Semifinals out
(Czech Republic) Tomáš Berdych [6]		(Spain) David Ferrer [4]	
Quarterfinals out
(Switzerland) Roger Federer [1]	(Croatia) Marin Čilić [12]	(Serbia) Janko Tipsarević [8]	(Argentina) Juan Martín del Potro [7]
4th round out
(United States) Mardy Fish [23]	(Spain) Nicolás Almagro [11]	(Canada) Milos Raonic [15]	(Slovakia) Martin Kližan
(Germany) Philipp Kohlschreiber [19]	(France) Richard Gasquet [13]	(United States) Andy Roddick [20]	(Switzerland) Stanislas Wawrinka [18]
3rd round out
(Spain) Fernando Verdasco [25]	(France) Gilles Simon [16]	(United States) Jack Sock (WC)	(United States) Sam Querrey [27]
(Spain) Feliciano López [30]	(United States) James Blake (WC)	(Japan) Kei Nishikori [17]	(France) Jérémy Chardy [32]
(Slovenia) Grega Žemlja (Q)	(United States) John Isner [9]	(United States) Steve Johnson (Q)	(Australia) Lleyton Hewitt (WC)
(Argentina) Leonardo Mayer	(Italy) Fabio Fognini	(Ukraine) Alexandr Dolgopolov [14]	(France) Julien Benneteau [31]
2nd round out
(Germany) Björn Phau	(Spain) Albert Ramos Viñolas	(Russia) Nikolay Davydenko	(Chinese Taipei) Wang Yeu-tzuoo (Q)
(Germany) Philipp Petzschner	(Italy) Flavio Cipolla	(Spain) Rubén Ramírez Hidalgo	(Estonia) Jürgen Zopp
(Croatia) Ivan Dodig	(Spain) Pablo Andújar	(Spain) Marcel Granollers [24]	(France) Paul-Henri Mathieu (PR)
(Germany) Daniel Brands (Q)	(United States) Tim Smyczek (Q)	(Australia) Matthew Ebden	(France) Jo-Wilfried Tsonga [5]
(United States) Brian Baker	(Germany) Cedrik-Marcel Stebe	(France) Benoît Paire	(Finland) Jarkko Nieminen
(United States) Bradley Klahn (Q)	(Latvia) Ernests Gulbis	(Luxembourg) Gilles Müller	(Netherlands) Igor Sijsling (Q)
(United States) Ryan Harrison	(Spain) Tommy Robredo (PR)	(Australia) Bernard Tomic	(Spain) Guillermo García López
(Cyprus) Marcos Baghdatis	(Belgium) Steve Darcis	(United States) Dennis Novikov (WC)	(Brazil) Rogério Dutra da Silva
1st round out
(United States) Donald Young	(Belgium) Maxime Authom (Q)	(United States) Robby Ginepri (WC)	(Portugal) Rui Machado
(Japan) Go Soeda	(Argentina) Guido Pella (Q)	(Croatia) Ivo Karlović	(United States) Michael Russell
(Czech Republic) Radek Štěpánek	(France) Nicolas Mahut	(Slovenia) Blaž Kavčič	(Germany) Florian Mayer [22]
(Chinese Taipei) Lu Yen-hsun	(India) Somdev Devvarman (PR)	(Uzbekistan) Denis Istomin	(Belgium) David Goffin
(Russia) Alex Bogomolov Jr.	(Japan) Hiroki Moriya (Q)	(Brazil) Thomaz Bellucci	(Netherlands) Robin Haase
(United States) Denis Kudla (WC)	(Slovakia) Lukáš Lacko	(Russia) Igor Andreev	(Colombia) Santiago Giraldo
(Australia) Marinko Matosevic	(Romania) Adrian Ungur	(United States) Bobby Reynolds (Q)	(Argentina) Guido Andreozzi (Q)
(Italy) Filippo Volandri	(Japan) Tatsuma Ito	(Colombia) Alejandro Falla	(Slovakia) Karol Beck (Q)
(France) Guillaume Rufin (WC)	(Czech Republic) Jan Hájek	(Brazil) Ricardo Mello (Q)	(Serbia) Viktor Troicki [29]
(France) Michaël Llodra	(Bulgaria) Grigor Dimitrov	(Kazakhstan) Mikhail Kukushkin	(Belgium) Xavier Malisse
(Spain) Albert Montañés	(Austria) Jürgen Melzer	(United States) Rajeev Ram	(Germany) Tommy Haas [21]
(Russia) Mikhail Youzhny [28]	(Germany) Tobias Kamke	(Spain) Daniel Gimeno Traver	(South Africa) Kevin Anderson
(France) Florent Serra (LL)	(Germany) Benjamin Becker	(Poland) Łukasz Kubot	(Italy) Andreas Seppi [26]
(United States) Rhyne Williams (Q)	(Argentina) Carlos Berlocq	(France) Édouard Roger-Vasselin	(Argentina) Juan Mónaco [10]
(United States) Jesse Levine	(Germany) Matthias Bachinger (Q)	(Tunisia) Malek Jaziri	(Ukraine) Sergiy Stakhovsky
(Belgium) Olivier Rochus	(Poland) Jerzy Janowicz	(Russia) Teymuraz Gabashvili (Q)	(Italy) Paolo Lorenzi

Women's singles

Champion		Runner-up	
(United States) Serena Williams [4]		(Belarus) Victoria Azarenka [1]	
Semifinals out
(Russia) Maria Sharapova [3]		(Italy) Sara Errani [10]	
Quarterfinals out
(Australia) Samantha Stosur [7]	(France) Marion Bartoli [11]	(Serbia) Ana Ivanovic [12]	(Italy) Roberta Vinci [20]
4th round out
(Georgia (country)) Anna Tatishvili	(United Kingdom) Laura Robson	(Russia) Nadia Petrova [19]	(Czech Republic) Petra Kvitová [5]
(Bulgaria) Tsvetana Pironkova	(Czech Republic) Andrea Hlaváčková	(Germany) Angelique Kerber [6]	(Poland) Agnieszka Radwańska [2]
3rd round out
(China) Zheng Jie [28]	(Luxembourg) Mandy Minella	(China) Li Na [9]	(United States) Varvara Lepchenko [31]
(United States) Mallory Burdette (WC)	(Czech Republic) Lucie Šafářová [15]	(France) Kristina Mladenovic (WC)	(France) Pauline Parmentier
(Spain) Sílvia Soler Espinosa	(United States) Sloane Stephens	(Russia) Maria Kirilenko [14]	(Russia) Ekaterina Makarova
(Belarus) Olga Govortsova	(Russia) Olga Puchkova (Q)	(Slovakia) Dominika Cibulková [13]	(Serbia) Jelena Janković [30]
2nd round out
(Belgium) Kirsten Flipkens (Q)	(Slovakia) Magdaléna Rybáriková (Q)	(Czech Republic) Kristýna Plíšková (Q)	(Romania) Sorana Cîrstea
(Australia) Casey Dellacqua	(Belgium) Kim Clijsters [23]	(Australia) Anastasia Rodionova (Q)	(Romania) Edina Gallovits-Hall (Q)
(Spain) Lourdes Domínguez Lino	(Czech Republic) Lucie Hradecká	(Romania) Simona Halep	(Canada) Aleksandra Wozniak
(Switzerland) Romina Oprandi	(Russia) Anastasia Pavlyuchenkova [17]	(Belgium) Yanina Wickmayer [25]	(France) Alizé Cornet
(Romania) Irina-Camelia Begu	(Japan) Ayumi Morita	(Germany) Tatjana Malek (Q)	(Sweden) Sofia Arvidsson
(Hungary) Gréta Arn	(Kazakhstan) Galina Voskoboeva	(Russia) Elena Vesnina	(Spain) María José Martínez Sánchez
(United States) Venus Williams	(United Kingdom) Johanna Konta (Q)	(Netherlands) Kiki Bertens	(Russia) Vera Dushevina
(Serbia) Bojana Jovanovski	(Kazakhstan) Yaroslava Shvedova	(Spain) Lara Arruabarrena Vecino (Q)	(Spain) Carla Suárez Navarro
1st round out
(Russia) Alexandra Panova	(Czech Republic) Barbora Záhlavová-Strýcová	(Chinese Taipei) Hsieh Su-wei	(France) Virginie Razzano
(Germany) Julia Görges [18]	(Australia) Olivia Rogowska (WC)	(France) Stéphanie Foretz Gacon	(Germany) Sabine Lisicki [16]
(United Kingdom) Heather Watson	(Ukraine) Lesia Tsurenko (Q)	(United States) Samantha Crawford	(United States) Victoria Duval (WC)
(France) Mathilde Johansson	(United States) Julia Cohen (WC)	(Switzerland) Stefanie Vögele (Q)	(Croatia) Petra Martić
(Hungary) Melinda Czink	(Kazakhstan) Sesil Karatantcheva	(Switzerland) Timea Bacsinszky (PR)	(Spain) Anabel Medina Garrigues [27]
(Australia) Jarmila Gajdošová	(Czech Republic) Iveta Benešová	(Romania) Alexandra Cadanțu	(United States) Melanie Oudin (WC)
(United States) Jamie Hampton	(Germany) Andrea Petkovic	(New Zealand) Marina Erakovic	(Slovakia) Daniela Hantuchová
(Israel) Julia Glushko (Q)	(Netherlands) Michaëlla Krajicek	(United States) Nicole Gibbs (WC)	(Slovenia) Polona Hercog
(Denmark) Caroline Wozniacki [8]	(Russia) Alla Kudryavtseva (Q)	(Italy) Camila Giorgi	(Romania) Monica Niculescu [26]
(Italy) Francesca Schiavone [22]	(Uzbekistan) Akgul Amanmuradova	(Japan) Kimiko Date-Krumm	(Ukraine) Elina Svitolina (Q)
(South Africa) Chanelle Scheepers	(Hungary) Ágnes Szávay (PR)	(Netherlands) Arantxa Rus	(Czech Republic) Klára Zakopalová [24]
(China) Peng Shuai [32]	(Greece) Eleni Daniilidou (LL)	(Croatia) Mirjana Lučić	(United States) CoCo Vandeweghe
(United Kingdom) Anne Keothavong	(United States) Bethanie Mattek-Sands (WC)	(Hungary) Tímea Babos	(Austria) Tamira Paszek [29]
(United States) Christina McHale [21]	(United States) Irina Falconi	(Italy) Nastassja Burnett (Q)	(Spain) Garbiñe Muguruza
(Sweden) Johanna Larsson	(Germany) Mona Barthel	(United States) Vania King	(Poland) Urszula Radwańska
(Ukraine) Kateryna Bondarenko	(Israel) Shahar Pe'er	(Kazakhstan) Ksenia Pervak	(Russia) Nina Bratchikova

== Events ==
=== Seniors ===
==== Men's singles ====
(United Kingdom) Andy Murray defeated (Serbia) Novak Djokovic, 7–6^{(12–10)}, 7–5, 2–6, 3–6, 6–2

• It was Murray's 1st career Grand Slam singles title.

==== Women's singles ====
(United States) Serena Williams defeated (Belarus) Victoria Azarenka, 6–2, 2–6, 7–5

• It was Williams' 15th career Grand Slam singles title and her 4th at the US Open.

==== Men's doubles ====
(United States) Bob Bryan / (United States) Mike Bryan defeated (India) Leander Paes / (Czech Republic) Radek Štěpánek, 6–3, 6–4

• It was Bob and Mike's 12th career Grand Slam doubles title and their 4th at the US Open.

==== Women's doubles ====
(Italy) Sara Errani / (Italy) Roberta Vinci defeated (Czech Republic) Andrea Hlaváčková / (Czech Republic) Lucie Hradecká, 6–4, 6–2

• It was Errani's 2nd career Grand Slam doubles title and her 1st at the US Open.
• It was Vinci's 2nd career Grand Slam doubles title and her 1st at the US Open.

==== Mixed doubles ====
(Russia) Ekaterina Makarova / (Brazil) Bruno Soares defeated (Czech Republic) Květa Peschke / (Poland) Marcin Matkowski, 6–7^{(8–10)}, 6–1, [12–10]

• It was Makarova's 1st career Grand Slam mixed doubles title.
• It was Soares' 1st career Grand Slam mixed doubles title.

=== Juniors ===
==== Boys' singles ====
(Canada) Filip Peliwo defeated (United Kingdom) Liam Broady, 6–2, 2–6, 7–5

==== Girls' singles ====
(United States) Samantha Crawford defeated (Estonia) Anett Kontaveit, 7–5, 6–3

==== Boys' doubles ====
(United Kingdom) Kyle Edmund / (Portugal) Frederico Ferreira Silva defeated (Australia) Nick Kyrgios / (Australia) Jordan Thompson, 5–7, 6–4, [10–6]

==== Girls' doubles ====
(United States) Gabrielle Andrews / (United States) Taylor Townsend defeated (Switzerland) Belinda Bencic / (Slovakia) Petra Uberalová, 6–3, 6–4

=== Wheelchair events ===
This year there was no wheelchair competition due to a calendar conflict with the Paralympic Games in London. Wheelchair competition returned in 2013.

== Singles seeds ==
The following are the seeded players and notable players who withdrew from the event. Seedings based on ATP and WTA rankings are as of August 20, 2012. Rankings and points as before August 27, 2012.

=== Men's singles ===
Seed	Rank	Player	Points before	Points defending	Points won	Points after	Status
1	1	(Switzerland) Roger Federer	12,165	720	360	11,805	Quarterfinals lost to (Czech Republic) Tomáš Berdych [6]
2	2	(Serbia) Novak Djokovic	11,270	2,000	1,200	10,470	Runner-up, lost to (United Kingdom) Andy Murray [3]
3	4	(United Kingdom) Andy Murray	7,290	720	2,000	8,570	Champion, defeated (Serbia) Novak Djokovic [2]
4	5	(Spain) David Ferrer	5,375	180	720	5,915	Semifinals lost to (Serbia) Novak Djokovic [2]
5	6	(France) Jo-Wilfried Tsonga	4,835	360	45	4,530	Second round lost to (Slovakia) Martin Kližan
6	7	(Czech Republic) Tomáš Berdych	4,200	90	720	4,830	Semifinals lost to (United Kingdom) Andy Murray [3]
7	8	(Argentina) Juan Martín del Potro	3,620	90	360	3,890	Quarterfinals lost to (Serbia) Novak Djokovic [2]
8	9	(Serbia) Janko Tipsarević	3,285	360	360	3,285	Quarterfinals lost to (Spain) David Ferrer [4]
9	10	(United States) John Isner	2,880	360	90	2,610	Third round lost to (Germany) Philipp Kohlschreiber [19]
10	11	(Argentina) Juan Mónaco	2,735	180	10	2,565	First round lost to (Spain) Guillermo García López
11	12	(Spain) Nicolás Almagro	2,305	10	180	2,475	Fourth round lost to (Czech Republic) Tomáš Berdych [6]
12	13	(Croatia) Marin Čilić	2,185	90	360	2,455	Quarterfinals lost to (United Kingdom) Andy Murray [3]
13	14	(France) Richard Gasquet	2,030	45	180	2,165	Fourth round lost to (Spain) David Ferrer [4]
14	15	(Ukraine) Alexandr Dolgopolov	1,905	180	90	1,815	Third round lost (Switzerland) Stan Wawrinka [18]
15	16	(Canada) Milos Raonic	1,900	0	180	2,080	Fourth round lost to (United Kingdom) Andy Murray [3]
16	17	(France) Gilles Simon	1,890	180	90	1,800	Third round lost to (United States) Mardy Fish [23]
17	18	(Japan) Kei Nishikori	1,790	10	90	1,870	Third round lost to (Croatia) Marin Čilić [12]
18	19	(Switzerland) Stan Wawrinka	1,730	45	180	1,865	Fourth round lost to (Serbia) Novak Djokovic [2]
19	20	(Germany) Philipp Kohlschreiber	1,685	10	180	1,855	Fourth round lost to (Serbia) Janko Tipsarević [8]
20	22	(United States) Andy Roddick	1,600	360	180	1,420	Fourth round lost to (Argentina) Juan Martín del Potro [7]
21	21	(Germany) Tommy Haas	1,633	90	10	1,553	First round lost to (Latvia) Ernests Gulbis
22	23	(Germany) Florian Mayer	1,580	90	10	1,500	First round retired against (United States) Jack Sock [WC]
23	25	(United States) Mardy Fish	1,535	180	180	1,535	Fourth round withdrew for health reasons
24	24	(Spain) Marcel Granollers	1,555	90	45	1,510	Second round lost to (United States) James Blake [WC]
25	26	(Spain) Fernando Verdasco	1,525	90	90	1,525	Third round lost to (Switzerland) Roger Federer [1]
26	27	(Italy) Andreas Seppi	1,390	10	10	1,390	First round lost to (Spain) Tommy Robredo [PR]
27	28	(United States) Sam Querrey	1,350	0	90	1,440	Third round lost to (Czech Republic) Tomáš Berdych [6]
28	29	(Russia) Mikhail Youzhny	1,290	10	10	1,290	First round lost to (Luxembourg) Gilles Müller
29	30	(Serbia) Viktor Troicki	1,255	10	10	1,255	First round lost to (Germany) Cedrik-Marcel Stebe
30	31	(Spain) Feliciano López	1,220	90	90	1,220	Third round lost to (United Kingdom) Andy Murray [3]
31	35	(France) Julien Benneteau	1,075	90	90	1,075	Third round lost to (Serbia) Novak Djokovic [2]
32	32	(France) Jérémy Chardy	1,168	0	90	1,258	Third round lost to (Slovakia) Martin Kližan

The following player would have been seeded, but he withdrew from the event.

Rank	Player	Points before	Points defending	Points after	Reason
3	(Spain) Rafael Nadal	8,715	1,200	7,515	Knee tendinitis

=== Women's singles ===
Seed	Rank	Player	Points before	Points defending	Points won	Points after	Status
1	1	(Belarus) Victoria Azarenka	9,025	160	1,400	10,265	Runner-up, lost to (United States) Serena Williams [4]
2	2	(Poland) Agnieszka Radwańska	8,115	100	280	8,295	Fourth round lost to (Italy) Roberta Vinci [20]
3	3	(Russia) Maria Sharapova	7,695	160	900	8,435	Semifinals lost to (Belarus) Victoria Azarenka [1]
4	4	(United States) Serena Williams	7,300	1,400	2,000	7,900	Champion, defeated (Belarus) Victoria Azarenka [1]
5	5	(Czech Republic) Petra Kvitová	6,415	5	280	6,690	Fourth round lost to (France) Marion Bartoli [11]
6	6	(Germany) Angelique Kerber	5,705	900	280	5,085	Fourth round lost to (Italy) Sara Errani [10]
7	7	(Australia) Samantha Stosur	5,700	2,000	500	4,200	Quarterfinals lost to (Belarus) Victoria Azarenka [1]
8	9	(Denmark) Caroline Wozniacki	4,335	900	5	3,440	First round lost to (Romania) Irina-Camelia Begu
9	8	(China) Li Na	4,371	5	160	4,526	Third round lost to (United Kingdom) Laura Robson
10	10	(Italy) Sara Errani	3,860	5	900	4,755	Semifinals lost to (United States) Serena Williams [4]
11	11	(France) Marion Bartoli	3,400	100	500	3,800	Quarterfinals lost to (Russia) Maria Sharapova [3]
12	13	(Serbia) Ana Ivanovic	2,980	280	500	3,200	Quarterfinals lost to (United States) Serena Williams [4]
13	14	(Slovakia) Dominika Cibulková	2,945	100	160	3,005	Third round lost to (Italy) Roberta Vinci [20]
14	12	(Russia) Maria Kirilenko	3,055	280	160	2,935	Third round lost to (Czech Republic) Andrea Hlaváčková
15	17	(Czech Republic) Lucie Šafářová	2,210	160	160	2,210	Third round lost to (Russia) Nadia Petrova [19]
16	23	(Germany) Sabine Lisicki	1,863	280	5	1,588	First round lost to (Romania) Sorana Cîrstea
17	20	(Russia) Anastasia Pavlyuchenkova	2,075	500	100	1,675	Second round lost to (France) Kristina Mladenovic [WC]
18	21	(Germany) Julia Görges	1,970	160	5	1,815	First round lost to (Czech Republic) Kristýna Plíšková [Q]
19	22	(Russia) Nadia Petrova	1,885	160	280	2,005	Fourth round lost to (Russia) Maria Sharapova [3]
20	19	(Italy) Roberta Vinci	2,085	160	500	2,425	Quarterfinals lost to (Italy) Sara Errani [10]
21	24	(United States) Christina McHale	1,780	160	5	1,625	First round lost to (Netherlands) Kiki Bertens
22	26	(Italy) Francesca Schiavone	1,716	280	5	1,441	First round lost to (United States) Sloane Stephens
23	25	(Belgium) Kim Clijsters	1,765	0	100	1,865	Second round lost to (United Kingdom) Laura Robson
24	30	(Czech Republic) Klára Zakopalová	1,670	5	5	1,670	First round lost to (Czech Republic) Andrea Hlaváčková
25	29	(Belgium) Yanina Wickmayer	1,675	100	100	1,675	Second round lost to (France) Pauline Parmentier
26	33	(Romania) Monica Niculescu	1,581	280	5	1,306	First round lost to (Japan) Ayumi Morita
27	36	(Spain) Anabel Medina Garrigues	1,540	160	5	1,385	First round lost to (Czech Republic) Lucie Hradecká
28	28	(China) Zheng Jie	1,676	100	160	1,736	Third round lost to (Belarus) Victoria Azarenka [1]
29	31	(Austria) Tamira Paszek	1,603	5	5	1,603	First round lost to (Belarus) Olga Govortsova
30	27	(Serbia) Jelena Janković	1,681	160	160	1,681	Third round lost to (Poland) Agnieszka Radwańska [2]
31	32	(United States) Varvara Lepchenko	1,600	5	160	1,755	Third round lost to (Australia) Samantha Stosur [7]
32	34	(China) Peng Shuai	1,580	280	5	1,305	First round lost to (Russia) Elena Vesnina

The following players would have been seeded, but they withdrew from the event.

Rank	Player	Points before	Points defending	Points after	Reason
15	(Estonia) Kaia Kanepi	2,514	100	2,414	Achilles tendon injury
16	(Russia) Vera Zvonareva	2,375	500	1,875	Viral illness
18	(Italy) Flavia Pennetta	2,190	500	1,690	Right wrist injury
49	(Czech Republic) Petra Cetkovská	1,315	100	1,215	Right ankle injury

== Wild card entries ==
Below are the lists of the wild card awardees entering in the main draws.

=== Men's singles wild card entries ===
1. (United States) James Blake
2. (United States) Robby Ginepri
3. (Australia) Lleyton Hewitt
4. (United States) Steve Johnson
5. (United States) Denis Kudla
6. (United States) Dennis Novikov
7. (France) Guillaume Rufin
8. (United States) Jack Sock

=== Women's singles wild card entries ===
1. (United States) Mallory Burdette
2. (United States) Julia Cohen
3. (United States) Victoria Duval
4. (United States) Nicole Gibbs
5. (United States) Bethanie Mattek-Sands
6. (France) Kristina Mladenovic
7. (United States) Melanie Oudin
8. (Australia) Olivia Rogowska

=== Men's doubles wild card entries ===
1. (United States) Chase Buchanan / (United States) Bradley Klahn
2. (United States) Christian Harrison / (United States) Ryan Harrison
3. (United States) Steve Johnson / (United States) Jack Sock
4. (Austria) Jürgen Melzer / (Germany) Philipp Petzschner
5. (United States) Nicholas Monroe / (United States) Donald Young
6. (United States) Dennis Novikov / (United States) Michael Redlicki
7. (United States) Bobby Reynolds / (United States) Michael Russell

=== Women's' doubles wild card entries ===
1. (United States) Mallory Burdette / (United States) Nicole Gibbs
2. (Belgium) Kim Clijsters / (Belgium) Kirsten Flipkens
3. (United States) Samantha Crawford / (United States) Allie Kiick
4. (United States) Irina Falconi / (United States) Maria Sanchez
5. (United States) Madison Keys / (United States) Jessica Pegula
6. (United States) Grace Min / (United States) Melanie Oudin
7. (United States) Serena Williams / (United States) Venus Williams

=== Mixed doubles wild card entries ===
1. (United States) Samantha Crawford / (United States) Mitchell Krueger
2. (United States) Irina Falconi / (United States) Steve Johnson
3. (United States) Varvara Lepchenko / (United States) Donald Young
4. (United States) Nicole Melichar / (United States) Brian Battistone
5. (United States) Grace Min / (United States) Bradley Klahn
6. (United States) Melanie Oudin / (United States) Jack Sock
7. (United States) Sloane Stephens / (United States) Rajeev Ram

== Qualifiers entries ==
=== Men's singles ===
1. (Netherlands) Igor Sijsling
2. (Japan) Hiroki Moriya
3. (United States) Tim Smyczek
4. (Argentina) Guido Pella
5. (Slovakia) Karol Beck
6. (Slovenia) Grega Žemlja
7. (United States) Rhyne Williams
8. (Belgium) Maxime Authom
9. (United States) Bradley Klahn
10. (Argentina) Guido Andreozzi
11. (Germany) Matthias Bachinger
12. (United States) Bobby Reynolds
13. (Chinese Taipei) Jimmy Wang
14. (Brazil) Ricardo Mello
15. (Germany) Daniel Brands
16. (Russia) Teymuraz Gabashvili

The following players received entry from a lucky loser spot:

1. (France) Florent Serra

=== Women's singles ===
1. (Slovakia) Magdaléna Rybáriková
2. (Germany) Tatjana Malek
3. (Italy) Nastassja Burnett
4. (United States) Samantha Crawford
5. (Australia) Anastasia Rodionova
6. (Ukraine) Lesia Tsurenko
7. (Romania) Edina Gallovits-Hall
8. (United Kingdom) Johanna Konta
9. (Belgium) Kirsten Flipkens
10. (Israel) Julia Glushko
11. (Spain) Lara Arruabarrena
12. (Ukraine) Elina Svitolina
13. (Russia) Olga Puchkova
14. (Russia) Alla Kudryavtseva
15. (Switzerland) Stefanie Vögele
16. (Czech Republic) Kristýna Plíšková

The following players received entry from a lucky loser spot:

1. (Greece) Eleni Daniilidou

== Protected ranking ==
The following players were accepted directly into the main draw using a protected ranking:

Men's Singles

- (India) Somdev Devvarman (PR 85)
- (France) Paul-Henri Mathieu (PR 96)
- (Spain) Tommy Robredo (PR 50)

Women's Singles

- (Switzerland) Timea Bacsinszky (PR 47)
- (Hungary) Ágnes Szávay (PR 44)

== Withdrawals ==
The following players were accepted directly into the main tournament, but withdrew with injuries or personal reasons.

Men's Singles
Before the tournament

- (Argentina) Juan Ignacio Chela → replaced by (Romania) Adrian Ungur
- (Spain) Juan Carlos Ferrero → replaced by (Belgium) Olivier Rochus
- (France) Gaël Monfils → replaced by (Germany) Benjamin Becker
- (Spain) Rafael Nadal → replaced by (United States) Rajeev Ram
- (Argentina) David Nalbandian → replaced by (France) Florent Serra

During the tournament

- (United States) Mardy Fish

Women's Singles
Before the tournament

- (United Kingdom) Elena Baltacha → replaced by (Hungary) Gréta Arn
- (Czech Republic) Petra Cetkovská → replaced by (Greece) Eleni Daniilidou
- (Estonia) Kaia Kanepi → replaced by (Spain) Garbiñe Muguruza
- (Russia) Svetlana Kuznetsova → replaced by (Kazakhstan) Sesil Karatantcheva
- (Italy) Flavia Pennetta → replaced by (Sweden) Johanna Larsson
- (Russia) Vera Zvonareva → replaced by (Australia) Casey Dellacqua

Preceded by 2012 Wimbledon Championships	Grand Slams	Succeeded by 2013 Australian Open
