= 2013 Fifth Third Bank Tennis Championships – Women's doubles =

Women's doubles
- 2013 Fifth Third Bank Tennis Championships

Final
- Champions: (Thailand) Nicha Lertpitaksinchai (Thailand) Peangtarn Plipuech
- Runners-up: (Israel) Julia Glushko (South Africa) Chanel Simmonds
- Score: 7–6^{(7–5)}, 6–3

Events
Singles	men	women
Doubles	men	women
- Fifth Third Bank Tennis Championships

Shuko Aoyama and Xu Yifan were the defending champions, having won the event in 2012, but Xu chose not to defend her title. Aoyama partnered up with Misaki Doi as the third seeds, but were knocked out of the tournament in the quarterfinals.

Thai duo Nicha Lertpitaksinchai and Peangtarn Plipuech won the tournament defeating the first seeds, Julia Glushko and Chanel Simmonds in the final, 7–6^{(7–5)}, 6–3

== Seeds ==
1. (Israel) Julia Glushko / (South Africa) Chanel Simmonds (final)
2. (Thailand) Nicha Lertpitaksinchai / (Thailand) Peangtarn Plipuech (champions)
3. (Japan) Shuko Aoyama / (Japan) Misaki Doi (quarterfinals)
4. (Bolivia) María Fernanda Álvarez Terán / (United States) Keri Wong (semifinals)

== Draw ==
Key

- Q = Qualifier
- WC = Wild card
- LL = Lucky loser
- Alt = Alternate
- ITF = ITF entry
- PR = Protected ranking
- SR = Special ranking
- SE = Special exempt
- JE = Junior exempt
- JR = Junior Accelerator Programme entrant
- CO = College Accelerator Programme entrant
- NG = Next Gen Accelerator Program entrant
- w/o = Walkover
- r = Retired
- d = Defaulted

First round
1	(Israel) J Glushko (South Africa) C Simmonds	7^{7}	6
(United States) J Loeb (United States) A Mueller	6^{4}	4
(United States) R Anderson (United States) L Embree	6	6
WC	(United States) C McGraw (Indonesia) N Ravita	4	2
4	(Bolivia) MF Álvarez Terán (United States) K Wong	6	6
(United States) M Kobelt (United States) CC Witten	4	1
(Russia) A Gabueva (Japan) K Nara	1	6	[10]
WC	(United States) J Brady (United States) L Herring	6	4	[7]
(Canada) S Dubois (Japan) Y Sema
(United States) M Brengle (Australia) S Peers	w/o
(United States) J Elie (United Kingdom) E Webley-Smith	2	1
3	(Japan) S Aoyama (Japan) M Doi	6	6
(United States) N Robinson (United States) E Turner	2	6	[4]
(France) S Benamar (United States) C Scholl	6	4	[10]
(United States) S Kent (United States) K McPhillips	3	2
2	(Thailand) N Lertpitaksinchai (Thailand) Pe Plipuech	6	6

Quarterfinals
1	(Israel) J Glushko (South Africa) C Simmonds	6	5	[10]
(United States) R Anderson (United States) L Embree	1	7	[5]
4	(Bolivia) MF Álvarez Terán (United States) K Wong	7^{8}	1	[10]
(Russia) A Gabueva (Japan) K Nara	6^{6}	6	[0]
(United States) M Brengle (Australia) S Peers	6	1	[10]
3	(Japan) S Aoyama (Japan) M Doi	4	6	[7]
(France) S Benamar (United States) C Scholl	1	1
2	(Thailand) N Lertpitaksinchai (Thailand) Pe Plipuech	6	6

Semifinals
1	(Israel) J Glushko (South Africa) C Simmonds	6	6^{2}	[10]
4	(Bolivia) MF Álvarez Terán (United States) K Wong	2	7^{7}	[6]
(United States) M Brengle (Australia) S Peers	4	6	[3]
2	(Thailand) N Lertpitaksinchai (Thailand) Pe Plipuech	6	4	[10]

Final
1	(Israel) J Glushko (South Africa) C Simmonds	6^{5}	3
2	(Thailand) N Lertpitaksinchai (Thailand) Pe Plipuech	7^{7}	6
