= 2012 Fifth Third Bank Tennis Championships – Men's singles =

Men's singles
- 2012 Fifth Third Bank Tennis Championships

Final
- Champion: (United States) Denis Kudla
- Runner-up: (Canada) Érik Chvojka
- Score: 5–7, 7–5, 6–1

Events
| Singles | men | women |
| Doubles | men | women |
- Fifth Third Bank Tennis Championships

Wayne Odesnik was the defending champion but decided not to participate.
Denis Kudla won the title, defeating Érik Chvojka 5–7, 7–5, 6–1 in the final.

== Seeds ==
1. (Belgium) Maxime Authom (first round)
2. (Dominican Republic) Víctor Estrella (first round)
3. (France) Adrian Mannarino (first round)
4. (United States) Denis Kudla (champion)
5. (United Kingdom) Jamie Baker (second round)
6. (Argentina) Agustín Velotti (quarterfinals)
7. (Australia) James Duckworth (quarterfinals)
8. (Canada) Érik Chvojka (final)

== Draw ==
Key

- Q = Qualifier
- WC = Wild card
- LL = Lucky loser
- Alt = Alternate
- ITF = ITF entry
- PR = Protected ranking
- SR = Special ranking
- SE = Special exempt
- JE = Junior exempt
- JR = Junior Accelerator Programme entrant
- CO = College Accelerator Programme entrant
- NG = Next Gen Accelerator Program entrant
- w/o = Walkover
- r = Retired
- d = Defaulted

=== Finals ===
Semifinals
WC | (United States) Christian Harrison | 3 | 5
4 | (United States) Denis Kudla | 6 | 7
8 | (Canada) Érik Chvojka | w/o
(United Kingdom) Alex Bogdanovic

Final
4 | (United States) Denis Kudla | 5 | 7 | 6
8 | (Canada) Érik Chvojka | 7 | 5 | 1

=== Top half ===
First round
1 | (Belgium) M Authom | 6^{5} | 5
(United States) Greg Ouellette | 7^{7} | 7
Q | (United States) S Bangoura | 2 | 6 | 3
WC | (United States) C Harrison | 6 | 3 | 6
WC | (United States) C Buchanan | 6^{5} | 1
(Australia) G Jones | 7^{7} | 6
Q | (Italy) T Fabbiano | 5 | 4
6 | (Argentina) A Velotti | 7 | 6
4 | (United States) D Kudla | 4 | 6 | 7
(United States) M Yani | 6 | 3 | 5
(United States) T Sandgren | 7 | 6
PR | (Canada) P Bester | 5 | 2
(France) G Sakharov | 2 | 4
(Australia) M Reid | 6 | 6
(United States) R Williams | 7 | 4 | 4
5 | (United Kingdom) J Baker | 5 | 6 | 6

Second round
(United States) Greg Ouellette | 7 | 1 | 0
WC | (United States) C Harrison | 5 | 6 | 6
(Australia) G Jones | 6 | 6^{5} | 2
6 | (Argentina) A Velotti | 4 | 7^{7} | 6
4 | (United States) D Kudla | 6 | 6
(United States) T Sandgren | 4 | 2
(Australia) M Reid | 6 | 1 | 7
5 | (United Kingdom) J Baker | 4 | 6 | 5

Quarterfinals
WC | (United States) C Harrison | 7^{7} | 2 | 6
6 | (Argentina) A Velotti | 6^{5} | 6 | 4
4 | (United States) D Kudla | 7 | 3 | 7
(Australia) M Reid | 5 | 6 | 5

Semifinals
WC | (United States) C Harrison | 3 | 5
4 | (United States) D Kudla | 6 | 7

=== Bottom half ===
First round
8 | (Canada) É Chvojka | 4 | 6 | 6
Q | (Japan) T Matsui | 6 | 0 | 1
WC | (United States) D Kosakowski | 4 | 4
Q | (United States) A Krajicek | 6 | 6
WC | (United States) Eric Quigley | 6 | 6
(Italy) R Ghedin | 3 | 2
(United States) M McClune | 1 | 7^{7} | 7^{7}
3 | (France) A Mannarino | 6 | 6^{2} | 6^{4}
7 | (Australia) J Duckworth | 7^{7} | 6^{4} | 6
SE/PR | (New Zealand) D King-Turner | 6^{3} | 7^{7} | 4
SE | (Switzerland) Adrien Bossel | 4 | 7^{7} | 3
(France) Charles-Antoine Brézac | 6 | 6^{5} | 6
(United States) A El Mihdawy | 6^{3} | 6 | 3
(United Kingdom) A Bogdanovic | 7^{7} | 4 | 6
(Australia) B Mitchell | 6 | 6
2 | (Dominican Republic) V Estrella | 2 | 0

Second round
8 | (Canada) É Chvojka | 3 | 6 | 6
Q | (United States) A Krajicek | 6 | 2 | 4
WC | (United States) Eric Quigley | 7^{7} | 3 | 4
(United States) M McClune | 6^{3} | 6 | 6
7 | (Australia) J Duckworth | 6 | 6
(France) Charles-Antoine Brézac | 3 | 2
(United Kingdom) A Bogdanovic | 7^{7} | 7^{7}
(Australia) B Mitchell | 6^{3} | 6^{3}

Quarterfinals
8 | (Canada) É Chvojka | 7 | 6
(United States) M McClune | 5 | 3
7 | (Australia) J Duckworth | 4 | 6 | 6^{5}
(United Kingdom) A Bogdanovic | 6 | 3 | 7^{7}

Semifinals
8 | (Canada) É Chvojka | w/o
(United Kingdom) A Bogdanovic
