= 2013 Fifth Third Bank Tennis Championships – Women's singles =

$50,000 ITF Women's Circuit tennis singles tournament

Women's singles
- 2013 Fifth Third Bank Tennis Championships

Final
- Champion: (United States) Shelby Rogers
- Runner-up: (France) Julie Coin
- Score: 6–4, 7–6^{(7–3)}

Events
Singles	men	women
Doubles	men	women
- Fifth Third Bank Tennis Championships

Julia Glushko was the defending champion of the Fifth Third Bank Tennis Championships, having won the event in 2012, but losing in the semifinals to Shelby Rogers in 2013. Rogers went on to win the title, defeating Julie Coin in the final, 6–4, 7–6^{(7–3)}.

== Seeds ==
1. (Japan) Misaki Doi (quarterfinals)
2. (Israel) Julia Glushko (semifinals)
3. (Japan) Kurumi Nara (semifinals)
4. (United States) Shelby Rogers (champion)
5. (Canada) Stéphanie Dubois (first round)
6. (United States) Grace Min (second round)
7. (United States) Irina Falconi (second round)
8. (South Africa) Chanel Simmonds (quarterfinals)

== Main draw ==
Key

- Q = Qualifier
- WC = Wild card
- LL = Lucky loser
- Alt = Alternate
- ITF = ITF entry
- PR = Protected ranking
- SR = Special ranking
- SE = Special exempt
- JE = Junior exempt
- JR = Junior Accelerator Programme entrant
- CO = College Accelerator Programme entrant
- NG = Next Gen Accelerator Program entrant
- w/o = Walkover
- r = Retired
- d = Defaulted

=== Finals ===
Semifinals
(France) Julie Coin	6	6
3	(Japan) Kurumi Nara	2	2
4	(United States) Shelby Rogers	6	6
2	(Israel) Julia Glushko	4	3

Final
(France) Julie Coin	4	6^{3}
4	(United States) Shelby Rogers	6	7^{7}

=== Top half ===
First round
1	(Japan) M Doi	6	4	6
Q	(United States) J Brady	2	6	0
LL	(Russia) Y Koroleva	0	1
(Ukraine) O Savchuk	6	6
(United States) J Elie	1	0
(France) J Coin	6	6
(Australia) S Peers	1	3
7	(United States) I Falconi	6	6
3	(Japan) K Nara	6	6
(United States) C Scholl	1	1
(United States) M Brengle	3	4
LL	(United States) A Mueller	6	6
(United Kingdom) E Webley-Smith	4	3
(Thailand) N Lertpitaksinchai	6	6
(United States) S Marand	4	3
6/WC	(United States) G Min	6	6

Second round
1	(Japan) M Doi	6	6
(Ukraine) O Savchuk	2	2
(France) J Coin	6	4	7^{7}
7	(United States) I Falconi	3	6	6^{5}
3	(Japan) K Nara	6	6
LL	(United States) A Mueller	2	3
(Thailand) N Lertpitaksinchai	6	4	6
6/WC	(United States) G Min	2	6	1

Quarterfinals
1	(Japan) M Doi	4	3
(France) J Coin	6	6
3	(Japan) K Nara	6	7
(Thailand) N Lertpitaksinchai	3	5

Semifinals
(France) J Coin	6	6
3	(Japan) K Nara	2	2

=== Bottom half ===
First round
5	(Canada) S Dubois	4	6	1
(Colombia) C Castaño	6	3	6
(South Korea) S-r Lee	6	4	5
WC	(United States) J Loeb	2	6	7
(Thailand) P Plipuech	3	1
Q	(Japan) N Osaka	6	6
(Bolivia) MF Álvarez Terán	0	1
4	(United States) S Rogers	6	6
8	(South Africa) C Simmonds	7	6
(United States) A Weinhold	5	3
Q	(United States) L Embree	6	6
Q	(Japan) M Osaka	2	4
(Japan) S Aoyama	6	6
WC	(United States) S Kent	1	2
(Japan) Y Sema	2	6^{5}
2	(Israel) J Glushko	6	7^{7}

Second round
(Colombia) C Castaño	6	6
WC	(United States) J Loeb	3	1
Q	(Japan) N Osaka	2	2
4	(United States) S Rogers	6	6
8	(South Africa) C Simmonds	7^{7}	1	6
Q	(United States) L Embree	6^{4}	6	4
(Japan) S Aoyama	6	4	6^{10}
2	(Israel) J Glushko	3	6	7^{12}

Quarterfinals
(Colombia) C Castaño	4	4
4	(United States) S Rogers	6	6
8	(South Africa) C Simmonds	2	5
2	(Israel) J Glushko	6	7

Semifinals
4	(United States) S Rogers	6	6
2	(Israel) J Glushko	4	3
