= 2012 US Open – Women's singles =

Women's singles
- 2012 US Open

Final
- Champion: (United States) Serena Williams
- Runner-up: (Belarus) Victoria Azarenka
- Score: 6–2, 2–6, 7–5

Details
- Draw: 128
- Seeds: 32

Events
Singles	men	women		boys	girls
Doubles	men	women	mixed	boys	girls
WC Singles	men	women	quad
WC Doubles	men	women	quad
Legends	men	women	mixed
← 2011 ·	US Open	· 2013 →

Serena Williams defeated Victoria Azarenka in the final, 6–2, 2–6, 7–5 to win the women's singles tennis title at the 2012 US Open. It was her fourth US Open singles title and 15th major singles title overall. Azarenka served for the championship and led 5–3 in the third set. It was the first time since 1995 that the final went to three sets. With the victory, Williams became the third woman in history to win Wimbledon, the Olympics, and the US Open in the same season, after Steffi Graf and Venus Williams.

Samantha Stosur was the defending champion, but was defeated in the quarterfinals by Azarenka.

Three-time US Open champion Kim Clijsters, who was on a 22-match winning streak at the tournament, lost to Laura Robson in the second round. This was also Clijsters' last professional tournament before her second retirement (her first being in 2007), until she returned to the tour in 2020 at the Dubai Tennis Championships.

This marked the first major main draw appearance of future world No. 1 and two-time major champion Garbiñe Muguruza, who lost to Sara Errani in the first round. It was also the first major main draw appearance of future WTA Finals champion Elina Svitolina, who lost to Ana Ivanovic in the first round. This marked the first time Ivanovic reached the quarterfinals of a major since winning the 2008 French Open.

== Seeds ==
1. (Belarus) Victoria Azarenka (final)
2. (Poland) Agnieszka Radwańska (fourth round)
3. (Russia) Maria Sharapova (semifinals)
4. (United States) Serena Williams (champion)
5. (Czech Republic) Petra Kvitová (fourth round)
6. (Germany) Angelique Kerber (fourth round)
7. (Australia) Samantha Stosur (quarterfinals)
8. (Denmark) Caroline Wozniacki (first round)
9. (China) Li Na (third round)
10. (Italy) Sara Errani (semifinals)
11. (France) Marion Bartoli (quarterfinals)
12. (Serbia) Ana Ivanovic (quarterfinals)
13. (Slovakia) Dominika Cibulková (third round)
14. (Russia) Maria Kirilenko (third round)
15. (Czech Republic) Lucie Šafářová (third round)
16. (Germany) Sabine Lisicki (first round)
17. (Russia) Anastasia Pavlyuchenkova (second round)
18. (Germany) Julia Görges (first round)
19. (Russia) Nadia Petrova (fourth round)
20. (Italy) Roberta Vinci (quarterfinals)
21. (United States) Christina McHale (first round)
22. (Italy) Francesca Schiavone (first round)
23. (Belgium) Kim Clijsters (second round)
24. (Czech Republic) Klára Zakopalová (first round)
25. (Belgium) Yanina Wickmayer (second round)
26. (Romania) Monica Niculescu (first round)
27. (Spain) Anabel Medina Garrigues (first round)
28. (China) Zheng Jie (third round)
29. (Austria) Tamira Paszek (first round)
30. (Serbia) Jelena Janković (third round)
31. (United States) Varvara Lepchenko (third round)
32. (China) Peng Shuai (first round)

Click on the seed number of a player to go to their draw section.

== Main draw ==
=== Key ===
- Q = Qualifier
- WC = Wild card
- LL = Lucky loser
- Alt = Alternate
- ITF = ITF entry
- PR = Protected ranking
- SR = Special ranking
- SE = Special exempt
- JE = Junior exempt
- JR = Junior Accelerator Programme entrant
- CO = College Accelerator Programme entrant
- NG = Next Gen Accelerator Program entrant
- w/o = Walkover
- r = Retired
- d = Defaulted

=== Finals ===
Quarterfinals
1	(Belarus) Victoria Azarenka	6	4	7^{7}
7	(Australia) Samantha Stosur	1	6	6^{5}
3	(Russia) Maria Sharapova	3	6	6
11	(France) Marion Bartoli	6	3	4
12	(Serbia) Ana Ivanovic	1	3
4	(United States) Serena Williams	6	6
10	(Italy) Sara Errani	6	6
20	(Italy) Roberta Vinci	2	4

Semifinals
1	(Belarus) Victoria Azarenka	3	6	6
3	(Russia) Maria Sharapova	6	2	4
4	(United States) Serena Williams	6	6
10	(Italy) Sara Errani	1	2

Final
1	(Belarus) Victoria Azarenka	2	6	5
4	(United States) Serena Williams	6	2	7

=== Top half ===
==== Section 1 ====
First round
1	(Belarus) V Azarenka	6	6
(Russia) A Panova	0	1
(Czech Republic) B Záhlavová-Strýcová	3	6	3
Q	(Belgium) K Flipkens	6	3	6
(Chinese Taipei) S-w Hsieh	3	6	3
Q	(Slovakia) M Rybáriková	6	2	6
(France) V Razzano	6	2	0^{r}
28	(China) J Zheng	4	6	0
18	(Germany) J Görges	6^{4}	1
Q	(Czech Republic) Kr Plíšková	7^{7}	6
(Luxembourg) M Minella	6	3	6
WC	(Australia) O Rogowska	2	6	3
(France) S Foretz Gacon	2	0
(Georgia (country)) A Tatishvili	6	6
(Romania) S Cîrstea	4	6	6
16	(Germany) S Lisicki	6	2	2

Second round
1	(Belarus) V Azarenka	6	6
Q	(Belgium) K Flipkens	2	2
Q	(Slovakia) M Rybáriková	3	1
28	(China) J Zheng	6	6
Q	(Czech Republic) Kr Plíšková	4	4
(Luxembourg) M Minella	6	6
(Georgia (country)) A Tatishvili	6^{5}	6	6
(Romania) S Cîrstea	7^{7}	1	2

Third round
1	(Belarus) V Azarenka	6	6
28	(China) J Zheng	0	1
(Luxembourg) M Minella	5	0
(Georgia (country)) A Tatishvili	7	6

Fourth round
1	(Belarus) V Azarenka	6	6
(Georgia (country)) A Tatishvili	2	2

==== Section 2 ====
First round
9	(China) N Li	6	6
(United Kingdom) H Watson	2	3
Q	(Ukraine) L Tsurenko	2	3
(Australia) C Dellacqua	6	6
Q	(United States) S Crawford	3	6^{6}
(United Kingdom) L Robson	6	7^{8}
WC	(United States) V Duval	3	1
23	(Belgium) K Clijsters	6	6
31	(United States) V Lepchenko	6	3	7
(France) M Johansson	3	6	5
Q	(Australia) An Rodionova	6	6
WC	(United States) J Cohen	3	0
Q	(Romania) E Gallovits-Hall	7	6
Q	(Switzerland) S Vögele	5	4
(Croatia) P Martić	1	1
7	(Australia) S Stosur	6	6

Second round
9	(China) N Li	6	6
(Australia) C Dellacqua	4	4
(United Kingdom) L Robson	7^{7}	7^{7}
23	(Belgium) K Clijsters	6^{4}	6^{5}
31	(United States) V Lepchenko	6	6
Q	(Australia) An Rodionova	2	2
Q	(Romania) E Gallovits-Hall	3	0
7	(Australia) S Stosur	6	6

Third round
9	(China) N Li	4	7^{7}	2
(United Kingdom) L Robson	6	6^{5}	6
31	(United States) V Lepchenko	6^{5}	2
7	(Australia) S Stosur	7^{7}	6

Fourth round
(United Kingdom) L Robson	4	4
7	(Australia) S Stosur	6	6

==== Section 3 ====
First round
3	(Russia) M Sharapova	6	6
(Hungary) M Czink	2	2
(Spain) L Domínguez Lino	6	6
(Kazakhstan) S Karatantcheva	4	1
PR	(Switzerland) T Bacsinszky	4	3
WC	(United States) M Burdette	6	6
(Czech Republic) L Hradecká	6	6
27	(Spain) A Medina Garrigues	3	3
19	(Russia) N Petrova	6	7^{7}
(Australia) J Gajdošová	3	6^{3}
(Romania) S Halep	7	7^{7}
(Czech Republic) I Benešová	5	6^{5}
(Romania) A Cadanțu	0	3
(Canada) A Wozniak	6	6
WC	(United States) M Oudin	4	0
15	(Czech Republic) L Šafářová	6	6

Second round
3	(Russia) M Sharapova	6	6
(Spain) L Domínguez Lino	0	1
WC	(United States) M Burdette	6	6
(Czech Republic) L Hradecká	2	4
19	(Russia) N Petrova	6	6
(Romania) S Halep	1	1
(Canada) A Wozniak	3	6	2
15	(Czech Republic) L Šafářová	6	4	6

Third round
3	(Russia) M Sharapova	6	6
WC	(United States) M Burdette	1	1
19	(Russia) N Petrova	6	7
15	(Czech Republic) L Šafářová	4	5

Fourth round
3	(Russia) M Sharapova	6	4	6
19	(Russia) N Petrova	1	6	4

==== Section 4 ====
First round
11	(France) M Bartoli	6	7^{7}
(United States) J Hampton	3	6^{5}
(Switzerland) R Oprandi	6	7
(Germany) A Petkovic	2	5
WC	(France) K Mladenovic	7	6
(New Zealand) M Erakovic	5	4
(Slovakia) D Hantuchová	4	6^{1}
17	(Russia) A Pavlyuchenkova	6	7^{7}
25	(Belgium) Y Wickmayer	7	6
Q	(Israel) J Glushko	5	2
(France) P Parmentier	6	6
(Netherlands) M Krajicek	2	4
WC	(United States) N Gibbs	5	3
(France) A Cornet	7	6
(Slovenia) P Hercog	6^{6}	1
5	(Czech Republic) P Kvitová	7^{8}	6

Second round
11	(France) M Bartoli	6	1	7
(Switzerland) R Oprandi	2	6	5
WC	(France) K Mladenovic	6	6
17	(Russia) A Pavlyuchenkova	1	2
25	(Belgium) Y Wickmayer	6^{5}	3
(France) P Parmentier	7^{7}	6
(France) A Cornet	4	3
5	(Czech Republic) P Kvitová	6	6

Third round
11	(France) M Bartoli	6	6
WC	(France) K Mladenovic	2	4
(France) P Parmentier	4	4
5	(Czech Republic) P Kvitová	6	6

Fourth round
11	(France) M Bartoli	1	6	6
5	(Czech Republic) P Kvitová	6	2	0

=== Bottom half ===
==== Section 5 ====
First round
8	(Denmark) C Wozniacki	2	2
(Romania) I-C Begu	6	6
(Spain) S Soler Espinosa	6	6
Q	(Russia) A Kudryavtseva	3	2
(Bulgaria) T Pironkova	6	6
(Italy) C Giorgi	3	4
(Japan) A Morita	6	6
26	(Romania) M Niculescu	3	3
22	(Italy) F Schiavone	3	4
(United States) S Stephens	6	6
(Uzbekistan) A Amanmuradova	6	2	4
Q	(Germany) T Malek	4	6	6
(Japan) K Date-Krumm	4	2
(Sweden) S Arvidsson	6	6
Q	(Ukraine) E Svitolina	3	2
12	(Serbia) A Ivanovic	6	6

Second round
(Romania) I-C Begu	4	6^{5}
(Spain) S Soler Espinosa	6	7^{7}
(Bulgaria) T Pironkova	7	6
(Japan) A Morita	5	2
(United States) S Stephens	5	6	6
Q	(Germany) T Malek	7	4	2
(Sweden) S Arvidsson	2	2
12	(Serbia) A Ivanovic	6	6

Third round
(Spain) S Soler Espinosa	1	7^{7}	3
(Bulgaria) T Pironkova	6	6^{3}	6
(United States) S Stephens	7^{7}	4	2
12	(Serbia) A Ivanovic	6^{4}	6	6

Fourth round
(Bulgaria) T Pironkova	0	4
12	(Serbia) A Ivanovic	6	6

==== Section 6 ====
First round
14	(Russia) M Kirilenko	6	6
(South Africa) C Scheepers	2	1
PR	(Hungary) Á Szávay	4	2^{r}
(Hungary) G Arn	6	3
(Kazakhstan) G Voskoboeva	6	6
(Netherlands) A Rus	1	3
(Czech Republic) A Hlaváčková	6	6
24	(Czech Republic) K Zakopalová	4	4
32	(China) S Peng	6^{5}	1
(Russia) E Vesnina	7^{7}	6
(Russia) E Makarova	6	6
LL	(Greece) E Daniilidou	1	4
(Croatia) M Lučić-Baroni	3	5
(Spain) MJ Martínez Sánchez	6	7
(United States) C Vandeweghe	1	1
4	(United States) S Williams	6	6

Second round
14	(Russia) M Kirilenko	6	6
(Hungary) G Arn	3	2
(Kazakhstan) G Voskoboeva	2	7^{7}	3
(Czech Republic) A Hlaváčková	6	6^{3}	6
(Russia) E Vesnina	3	4
(Russia) E Makarova	6	6
(Spain) MJ Martínez Sánchez	2	4
4	(United States) S Williams	6	6

Third round
14	(Russia) M Kirilenko	7	4	4
(Czech Republic) A Hlaváčková	5	6	6
(Russia) E Makarova	4	0
4	(United States) S Williams	6	6

Fourth round
(Czech Republic) A Hlaváčková	0	0
4	(United States) S Williams	6	6

==== Section 7 ====
First round
6	(Germany) A Kerber	6	6
(United Kingdom) A Keothavong	2	0
WC	(United States) B Mattek-Sands	3	1
(United States) V Williams	6	6
Q	(United Kingdom) J Konta	6	7
(Hungary) T Babos	2	5
(Belarus) O Govortsova	6	6
29	(Austria) T Paszek	3	4
21	(United States) C McHale	4	6	3
(Netherlands) K Bertens	6	4	6
Q	(Russia) O Puchkova	7^{7}	6^{2}	6
(United States) I Falconi	6^{5}	7^{7}	3
(Russia) V Dushevina	6	6
Q	(Italy) N Burnett	0	3
(Spain) G Muguruza	3	7^{8}	1
10	(Italy) S Errani	6	6^{6}	6

Second round
6	(Germany) A Kerber	6	5	7
(United States) V Williams	2	7	5
Q	(United Kingdom) J Konta	6	2	5
(Belarus) O Govortsova	2	6	7
(Netherlands) K Bertens	7	2	5
Q	(Russia) O Puchkova	5	6	7
(Russia) V Dushevina	0	1
10	(Italy) S Errani	6	6

Third round
6	(Germany) A Kerber	6	6
(Belarus) O Govortsova	1	2
Q	(Russia) O Puchkova	1	1
10	(Italy) S Errani	6	6

Fourth round
6	(Germany) A Kerber	6^{5}	3
10	(Italy) S Errani	7^{7}	6

==== Section 8 ====
First round
13	(Slovakia) D Cibulková	6^{5}	6	6
(Sweden) J Larsson	7^{7}	2	0
(Serbia) B Jovanovski	4	7	6
(Germany) M Barthel	6	5	2
(United States) V King	4	2
(Kazakhstan) Y Shvedova	6	6
(Poland) U Radwańska	1	1
20	(Italy) R Vinci	6	6
30	(Serbia) J Janković	6	6
(Ukraine) K Bondarenko	1	2
Q	(Spain) L Arruabarrena	6	7^{7}
(Israel) S Pe'er	4	6^{5}
(Kazakhstan) K Pervak	5	2^{r}
(Spain) C Suárez Navarro	7	1
(Russia) N Bratchikova	1	1
2	(Poland) A Radwańska	6	6

Second round
13	(Slovakia) D Cibulková	7^{7}	7^{7}
(Serbia) B Jovanovski	6^{3}	6^{3}
(Kazakhstan) Y Shvedova	6	5	5
20	(Italy) R Vinci	3	7	7
30	(Serbia) J Janković	6	6
Q	(Spain) L Arruabarrena	4	2
(Spain) C Suárez Navarro	6	3	0
2	(Poland) A Radwańska	4	6	6

Third round
13	(Slovakia) D Cibulková	2	5
20	(Italy) R Vinci	6	7
30	(Serbia) J Janković	3	5
2	(Poland) A Radwańska	6	7

Fourth round
20	(Italy) R Vinci	6	6
2	(Poland) A Radwańska	1	4

== Championship match statistics ==
Category	(United States) S. Williams	(Belarus) Azarenka
1st serve %	43/80 (54%)	65/101 (64%)
1st serve points won	33 of 43 = 77%	36 of 65 = 55%
2nd serve points won	15 of 37 = 41%	19 of 36 = 53%
Total service points won	48 of 80 = 60.00%	55 of 101 = 54.46%
Aces	13	0
Double faults	4	5
Winners	44	13
Unforced errors	45	28
Net points won	5 of 7 = 71%	10 of 13 = 77%
Break points converted	5 of 14 = 36%	4 of 8 = 50%
Return points won	46 of 101 = 46%	32 of 80 = 40%
Total points won	94	87

Preceded by 2012 Wimbledon Championships – Women's singles	Grand Slam women's singles	Succeeded by 2013 Australian Open – Women's singles
