= Mallory Burdette =

American tennis player

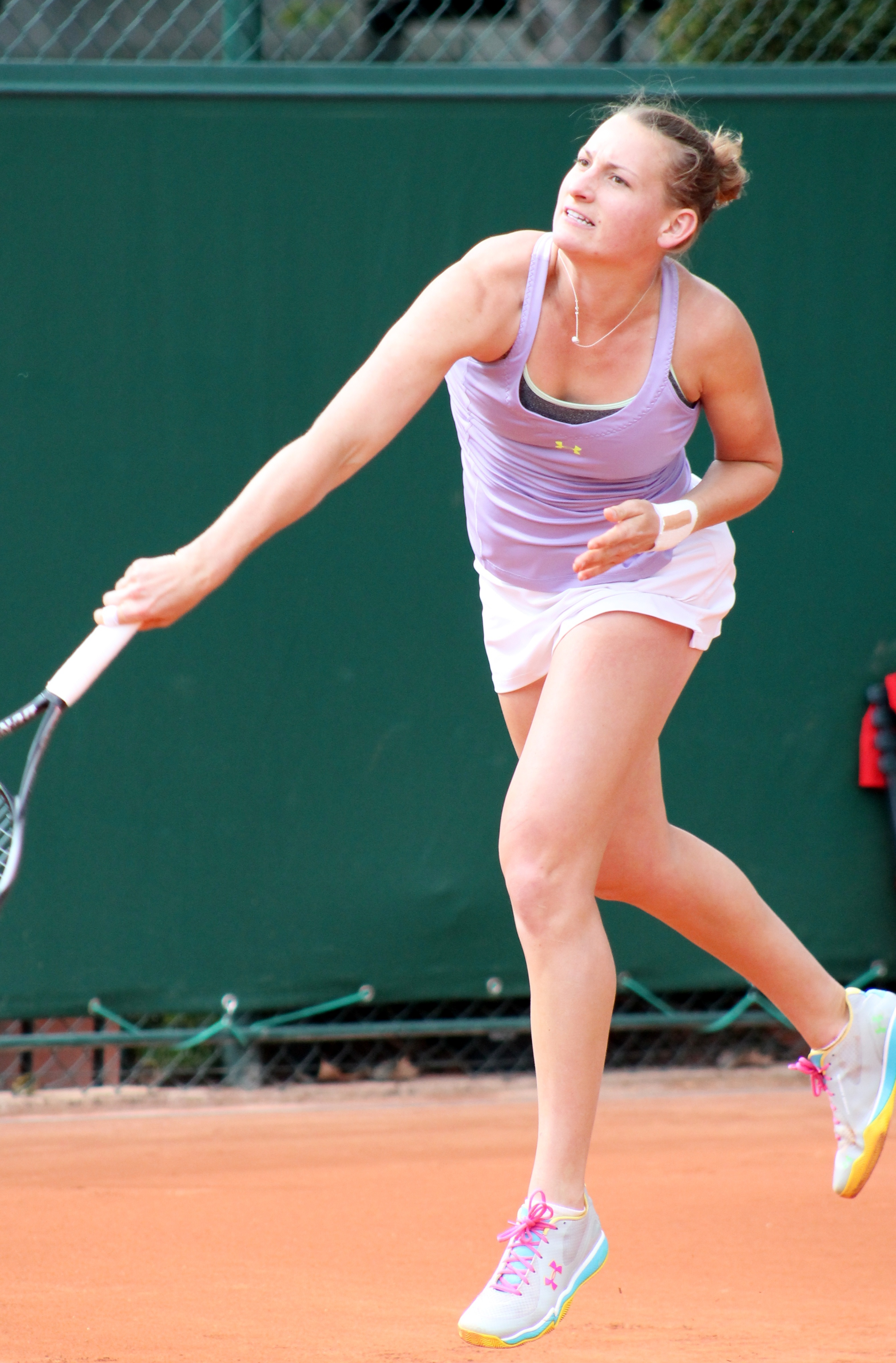
- Country (sports): United States
- Residence: Jackson, Georgia
- Born: January 28, 1991 (age 35) Macon, Georgia
- Height: 1.78 m (5 ft 10 in)
- Turned pro: 2012
- Retired: 2014
- Plays: Right (two-handed backhand)
- Prize money: $316,417

Singles
- Career record: 42–30
- Career titles: 2 ITF
- Highest ranking: No. 68 (June 24, 2013)

Grand Slam singles results
- French Open: 2R (2013)
- Wimbledon: 1R (2013)
- US Open: 3R (2012)

Doubles
- Career record: 11–15
- Career titles: 0
- Highest ranking: No. 292 (August 13, 2012)

Grand Slam doubles results
- French Open: 1R (2013)
- US Open: 2R (2011)

Mallory Burdette (born January 28, 1991) is an American former professional tennis player.

== Personal life ==
Burdette was born to Alan and Judy Burdette in Macon, Georgia. She has two sisters, Erin and Lindsay, and a brother Andy, who all played tennis at the college-level.

She would have been a senior at Stanford University in the fall of 2012, but she gave up her final year of college eligibility to turn professional after her strong run at the 2012 US Open, when she reached the third round, falling to then-world No. 3, Maria Sharapova.

She announced her retirement from professional tennis in October 2014, after being inactive for over a year due to a shoulder injury.

== Career ==
=== 2006–2007 ===
Burdette made her debut at the US Open, as a wildcard, 2006 in the women's doubles event. She partnered her sister Lindsay, and they were beaten by Michaëlla Krajicek and Corina Morariu in two sets.

In October, she received a wildcard to play in the qualifying draw of a $25k tournament in Augusta, Georgia, however, she lost the match to Bulgarian Svetlana Krivencheva in three tight sets. In November, she competed in the qualifying of the $50k tournament in Lawrenceville, Georgia, again as a wildcard, but was beaten by Tetiana Luzhanska. Burdette ended the year, after having competed in three events.

She was absent from the tour in 2007.

=== 2008 ===
In July 2008, Mallory entered her first tournament since 2006, an $10k event in Atlanta. For the first time, she not only qualified, but reached round two with a straight-sets win over Anastasia Kharchenko. She also made the quarterfinals in doubles (with sister Lindsay), losing to Mallory Cecil and Melanie Oudin.

This was the only tournament on the professional tour Burdette played in 2008.

=== 2009–2010 ===
In her only event of 2009, Burdette got a main draw wildcard at a $25k event in Lutz, Florida. She was beaten in the first round by Soledad Esperón. She made the quarterfinals in doubles (partnering Grace Min) though, falling in a tight match to Kimberly Couts and Sharon Fichman.

She did not play in 2010.

=== 2011–2012 ===
Burdette's only tournament of 2011 was the US Open women's doubles, where she received a wildcard together with her partner Hilary Barte. In the first round, they beat compatriots Alexa Glatch and Jamie Hampton in straight sets. – before advancing to the second round, where they lost against Andreja Klepač from Slovenia and Anna Tatishvili from Georgia.

Burdette received a wildcard into the main draw of the 2012 Stanford Classic in California. In the first round, she defeated Anne Keothavong in three sets. She lost to Marion Bartoli in round two, after leading in the first set.

A week after her second-round defeat in Stanford, on July 16, Burdette headed to compete in her first ITF event, a $10k hardcourt tournament held in Evansville. She qualified for the main draw following three straight-sets victories. Burdette defeated Sally Peers, Naomi Osaka, Bojana Bobusic, and Julia Elbaba, and reached her first final on the ITF Circuit. She faced top seed Duan Yingying and won in two sets. Burdette didn't drop a single set throughout the tournament. On top of that, she also managed a runner-up showing of doubles at the same event, partnering compatriot Natalie Pluskota.

The following week, Burdette headed to Lexington to compete in the $50k hardcourt event there, on a wildcard. She defeated top seed Olivia Rogowska and took her winning streak to ten when she defeated Jessica Pegula, in straight sets. However, her unbeaten run was ended in the third round when she was defeated by Madison Keys.

In the first week of August 2012, Burdette received a wildcard entry in the $100k Vancouver Open. She defeated lucky loser Sherazad Benamar, Olga Savchuk, Olivia Rogowska, and Chiara Scholl to secure her place in the final. Another straight-sets victory over Jessica Pegula brought Burdette her second ITF title within the space of a month. Similar to her first tournament win in Evansville, she won the title without dropping a set. As a result of the win in Vancouver, Burdette earned a main-draw wildcard for the US Open. In the first round, Burdette defeated Swiss Timea Bacsinszky, backing it up with another straight-sets win over Lucie Hradecká. Burdette's run came to an end in the third round, with a defeat by third-seeded Maria Sharapova.

=== 2013–2014 ===
While she did not play at the 2013 Australian Open, she entered the French Open for the first time and beat Donna Vekić in the first round but was eliminated in the second by top-ten player Agnieszka Radwańska. She also entered in doubles with Sloane Stephens. The pair lost in the opening round to the eventual champions, Ekaterina Makarova and Elena Vesnina.

Burdette had a nagging shoulder injury which kept her out of play during the 2014 season. She announced an official retirement from the sport in October 2014, citing the aforementioned injury the reason.

Her last match on the professional tour was a tight first-round loss to Marina Erakovic in Quebec City at the 2013 Challenge Bell, on September 9, 2013.

== ITF Circuit finals ==
Legend
$100,000 tournaments
$25,000 tournaments
$10,000 tournaments

=== Singles (2–0) ===
Result	No.	Date	Tournament	Surface	Opponent	Score
Win	1.	July 22, 2012	ITF Evansville, United States	Hard	(China) Duan Yingying	6–1, 6–2
Win	2.	August 5, 2012	Vancouver Open, Canada	Hard	(United States) Jessica Pegula	6–3, 6–0

=== Doubles (0–1) ===
Result	Date	Tournament	Surface	Partner	Opponents	Score
Loss	July 22, 2012	ITF Evansville, United States	Hard	(United States) Natalie Pluskota	(China) Duan Yingying (China) Xu Yifan	6–2, 6–3

== Singles performance timeline ==
Key
W	F	SF	QF	#R	RR	Q#	DNQ	A	NH

(W) winner; (F) finalist; (SF) semifinalist; (QF) quarterfinalist; (#R) rounds 4, 3, 2, 1; (RR) round-robin stage; (Q#) qualification round; (DNQ) did not qualify; (A) absent; (NH) not held; (SR) strike rate (events won / competed); (W–L) win–loss record.

Tournament	2012	2013	W–L
Grand Slam tournaments
Australian Open	A	A	0–0
French Open	A	2R	1–1
Wimbledon	A	1R	0–1
US Open	3R	1R	2–2
