= Lexington Open =

Lexington Challenger
- 2025 Lexington Open

Tournament information
- Event name: Lexington Open
- Location: Lexington, United States
- Venue: Hilary J. Boone Tennis Complex
- Surface: Hard / outdoors
- Website: lexingtonopen.org
ATP Tour
- Category: ATP Challenger Tour
- Draw: 32S / 32Q / 16D
- Prize money: $100,000 (2025), $82,000 (2024), $50,000
WTA Tour
- Category: ITF Women's World Tennis Tour, WTA Tour (2020)
- Draw: 32S / 32Q / 16D
- Prize money: $60,000 $275,000 (2020)

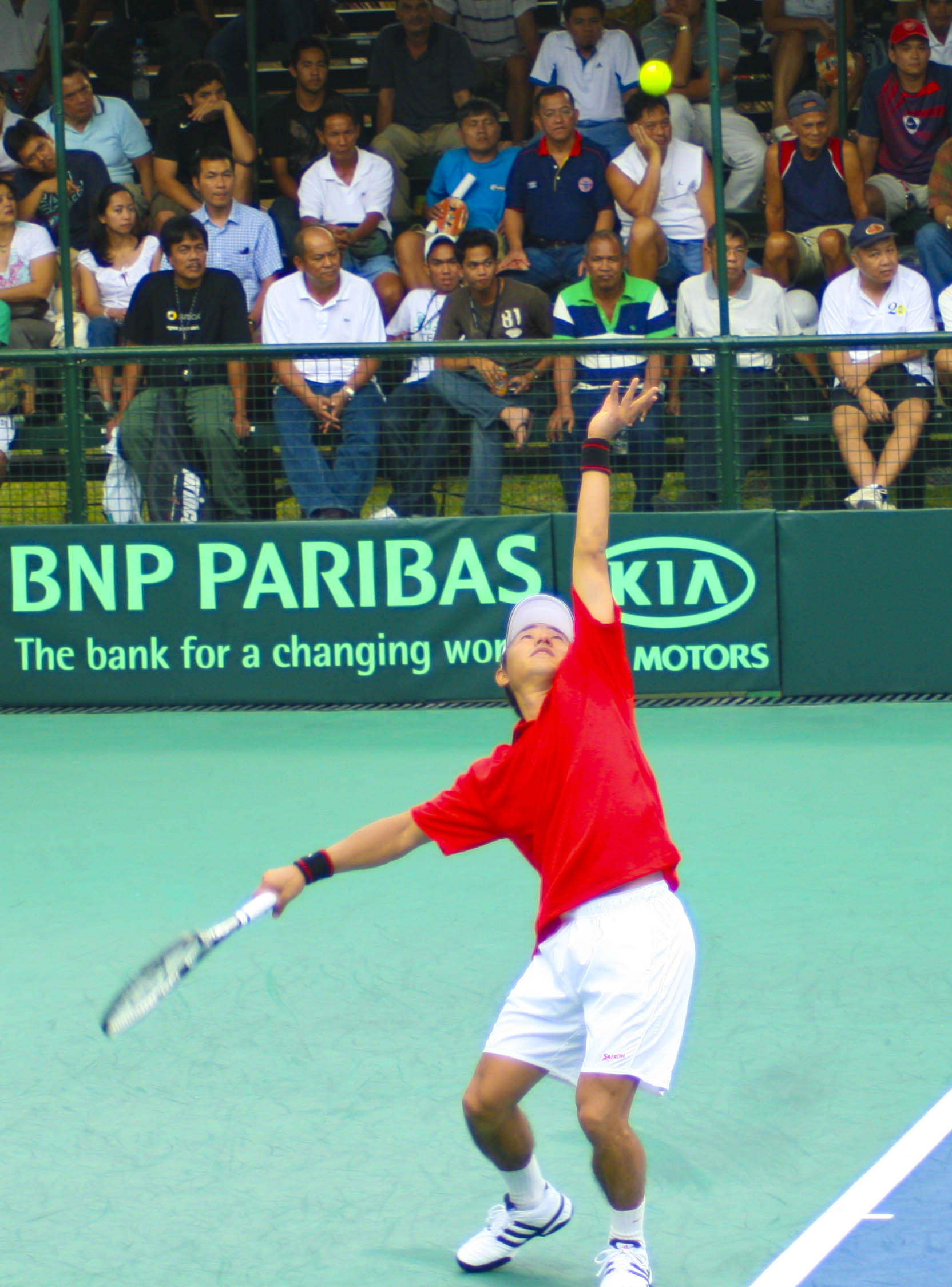
Japan's Takao Suzuki, singles winner in 2000, doubles winner in 2003, is one of two players, with Zimbabwe's Wayne Black, to have won both events

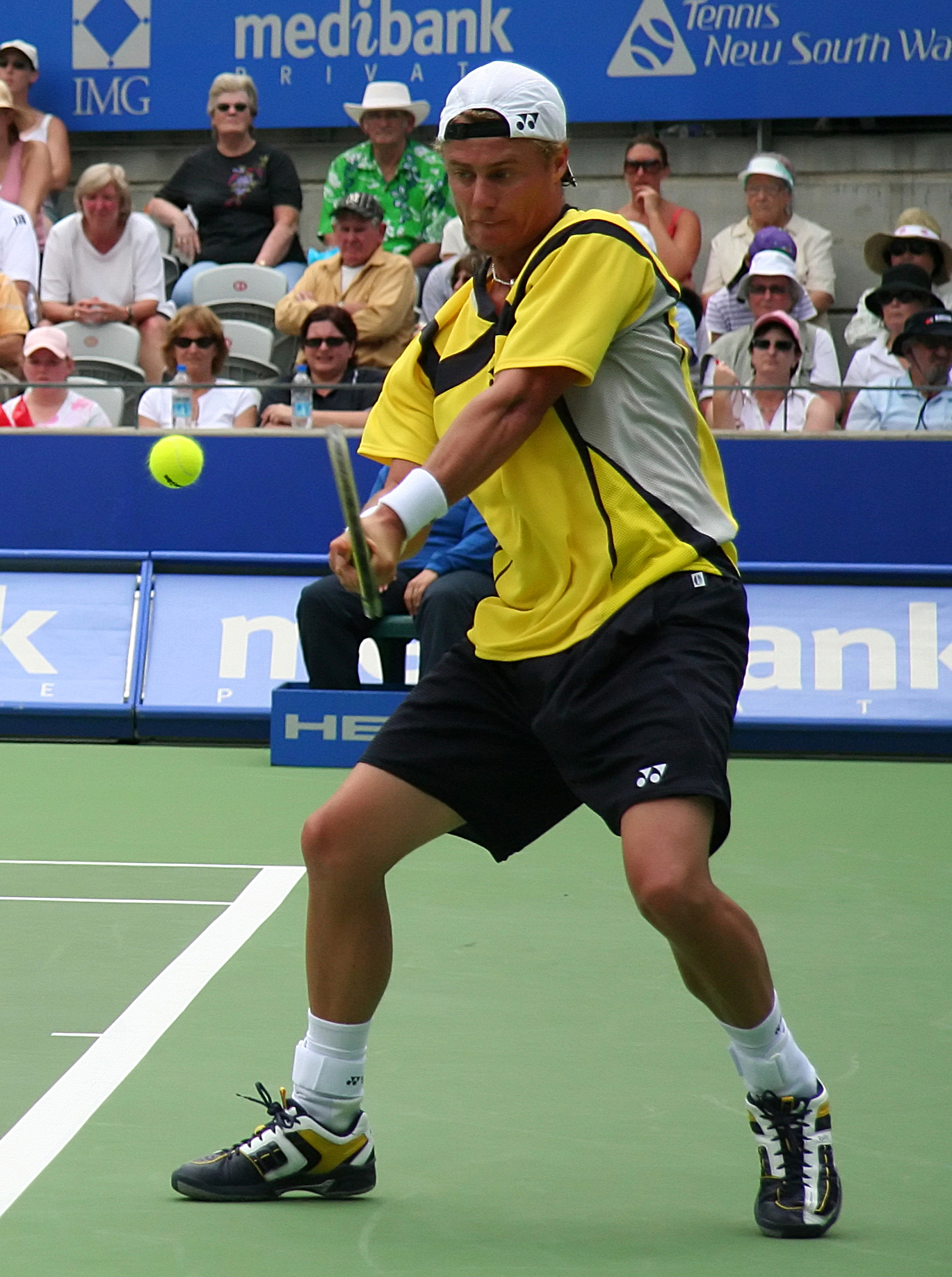
Partnering fellow Australian Ellwood, future world No. 1 in singles Lleyton Hewitt took the doubles title in 1998

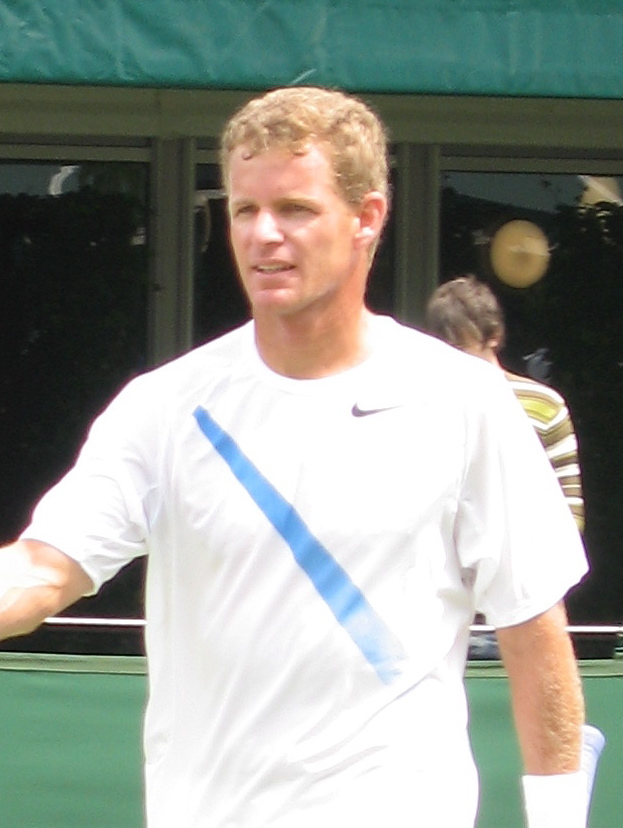
Eventual World No. 1 in doubles Mark Knowles from The Bahamas was the first to win the singles title in 1995

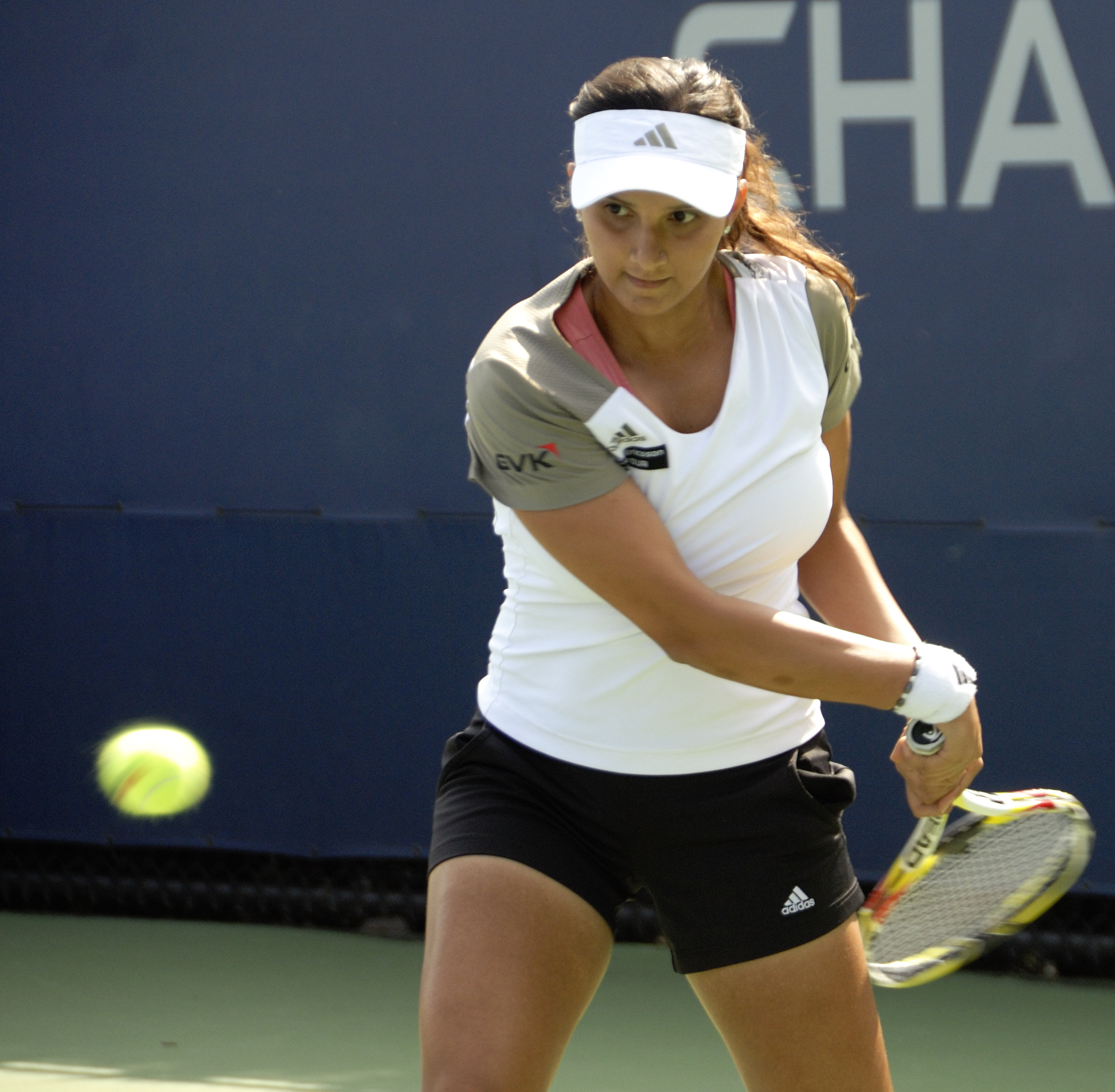
India's Sania Mirza, a former top-30 player, was the women's singles champion in 2009

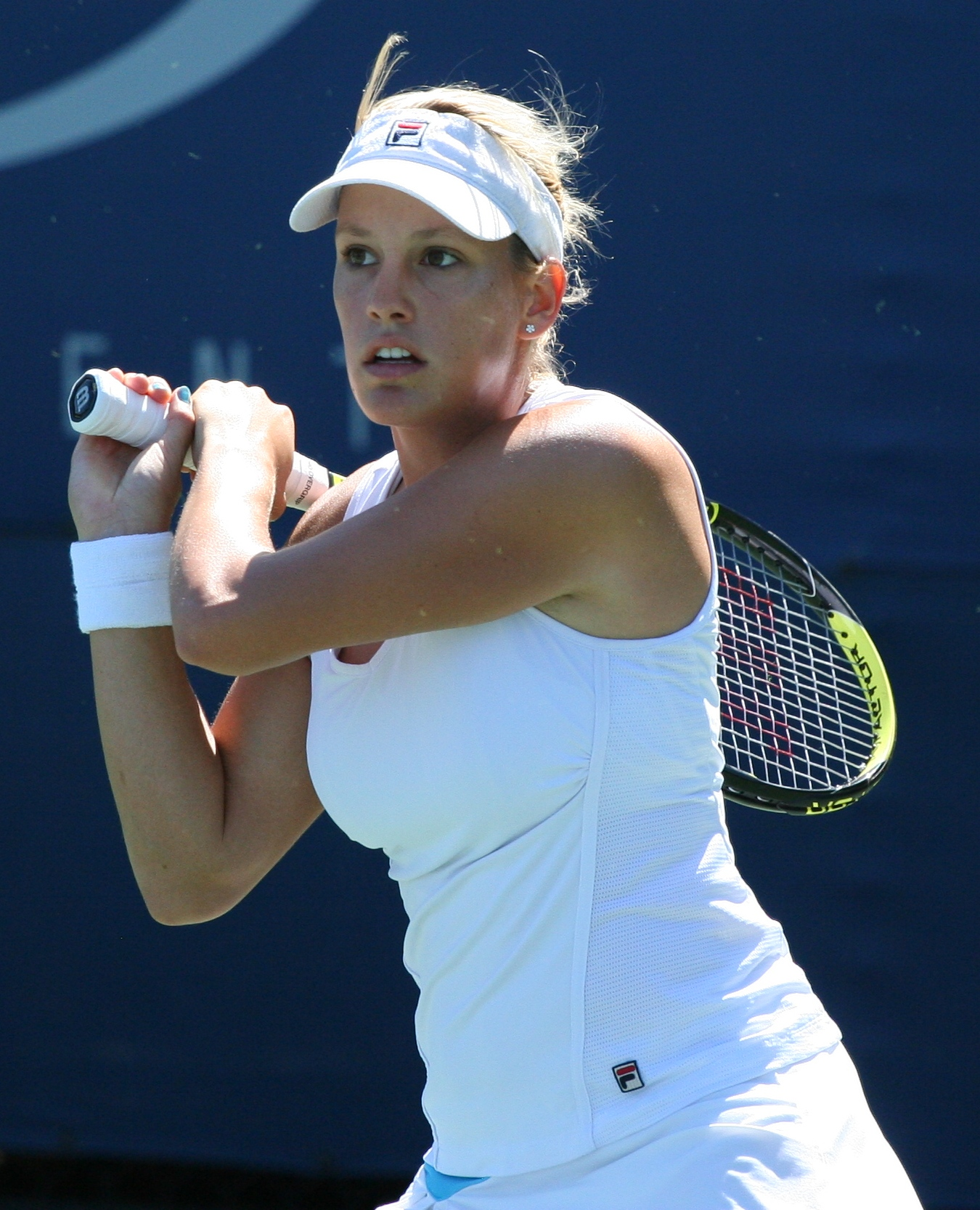
Canada's Stéphanie Dubois has reached the singles final three times here, winning the title in 2007 and finishing runner-up in 2005 and 2010

The Lexington Open (previously known as the Kentucky Bank Tennis Championships and the Fifth Third Bank Tennis Championships) is a professional tennis tournament played on outdoor hardcourts. It is currently part of the ATP Challenger Tour and the ITF Women's World Tennis Tour, and has been held annually at the Hilary J. Boone Tennis Complex in Lexington, Kentucky, since 1995 for men and since 1997 for women. It is the longest running active ATP Challenger Tour tournament in the US, marking its 30th edition in 2025. In 2020, the tournament was held as a once-off WTA Tour tournament. In 2022, it returned to the ITF Circuit.

== Women's results ==
=== Singles ===
Year	Champion	Runner-up	Score
2026	(Finland) Anastasia Kulikova	(United States) Ayana Akli	7–5, 6–4
2025	(China) Wang Xiyu	(Indonesia) Janice Tjen	3–6, 6–2, 6–4
2024	(China) Wei Sijia	(Thailand) Mananchaya Sawangkaew	7–5, 6–4
2023	(Mexico) Renata Zarazúa	(United States) Caroline Dolehide	1–6, 7–6^{(7–4)}, 7–5
2022	(United Kingdom) Katie Swan	(United Kingdom) Jodie Burrage	6–0, 3–6, 6–3
↑ ITF Circuit tournament ↑
2021	not held		
2020	(United States) Jennifer Brady	(Switzerland) Jil Teichmann	6–3, 6–4
↑ WTA International tournament ↑
2019	(South Korea) Kim Da-bin	(United States) Ann Li	6–1, 6–3
2018	(United States) Asia Muhammad	(United States) Ann Li	7–5, 6–1
2017	(United States) Grace Min	(United States) Sofia Kenin	6–4, 6–1
2016	(Netherlands) Michaëlla Krajicek	(Australia) Arina Rodionova	6–0, 2–6, 6–2
2015	(Japan) Nao Hibino	(United States) Samantha Crawford	6–2, 6–1
2014	(United States) Madison Brengle	(United States) Nicole Gibbs	6–3, 6–4
2013	(United States) Shelby Rogers	(France) Julie Coin	6–4, 7–6^{(7–3)}
2012	(Israel) Julia Glushko	(United Kingdom) Johanna Konta	6–3, 6–0
2011	(United States) Chiara Scholl	(United States) Amanda Fink	6–1, 6–1
2010	(Japan) Kurumi Nara	(Canada) Stéphanie Dubois	6–4, 6–4
2009	(India) Sania Mirza	(France) Julie Coin	7–6^{(7–5)}, 6–4
2008	(United States) Melanie Oudin	(United States) Carly Gullickson	6–4, 6–2
2007	(Canada) Stéphanie Dubois	(United Kingdom) Anne Keothavong	4–6, 6–3, 6–3
2006	(France) Camille Pin	(United States) Abigail Spears	7–5, 7–5
2005	(South Africa) Natalie Grandin	(Canada) Stéphanie Dubois	6–4, 6–3
2004	(France) Camille Pin	(South Korea) Jeon Mi-ra	7–5, 6–3
2003	(Japan) Miho Saeki	(Georgia (country)) Salome Devidze	6–4, 2–6, 7–5
2002	(France) Virginie Razzano	(United States) Samantha Reeves	7–6^{(7–5)}, 7–6^{(7–5)}
2001	(Slovenia) Katarina Srebotnik	(Germany) Sabine Klaschka	6–4, 7–5
2000	(United States) Jennifer Hopkins	(United States) Dawn Buth	6–3, 6–1
1999	(Argentina) Florencia Labat	(Australia) Annabel Ellwood	6–2, 5–7, 6–1
1998	(United Kingdom) Julie Pullin	(United Kingdom) Abigail Tordoff	6–4, 6–4
1997	(United States) Karin Miller	(South Africa) Liezel Horn	6–7^{(5–7)}, 6–1, 6–2
↑ ITF Circuit tournament ↑

=== Doubles ===
Year	Champions	Runners-up	Score
2026	(United States) Ayana Akli (2) (United States) Fiona Crawley	(United States) Savannah Broadus (United States) Kylie Collins	2–6, 7–6^{(7–3)}, [12–10]
2025	(United States) Ayana Akli (United States) Eryn Cayetano	(United States) Elvina Kalieva (United States) Alana Smith	4–6, 6–2, [10–4]
2024	(United States) Whitney Osuigwe (United States) Alana Smith	(United States) Carmen Corley (United States) Ivana Corley	7–6^{(7–5)}, 6–3
2023	(United States) Alexis Blokhina (United States) Ava Markham	(Australia) Olivia Gadecki (United States) Dalayna Hewitt	6–4, 7–6^{(7–1)}
2022	(Indonesia) Aldila Sutjiadi (Ukraine) Kateryna Volodko	(United States) Jada Hart (United States) Dalayna Hewitt	7–5, 6–3
↑ ITF Circuit tournament ↑
2021	not held		
2020	(United States) Hayley Carter (Brazil) Luisa Stefani	(Czech Republic) Marie Bouzková (Switzerland) Jil Teichmann	6–1, 7–5
↑ WTA International tournament ↑
2019	(United States) Robin Anderson (France) Jessika Ponchet	(United States) Ann Li (United States) Jamie Loeb	7–6^{(7–4)}, 6–7^{(5–7)}, [10–7]
2018	(United States) Hayley Carter (United States) Ena Shibahara	(United States) Sanaz Marand (Mexico) Victoria Rodríguez	6–3, 6–1
2017	(Australia) Priscilla Hon (Belarus) Vera Lapko	(Japan) Hiroko Kuwata (Russia) Valeria Savinykh	6–3, 6–4
2016	(Japan) Hiroko Kuwata (China) Zhu Lin	(United States) Sophie Chang (United States) Alexandra Mueller	6–0, 7–5
2015	(Japan) Nao Hibino (United Kingdom) Emily Webley-Smith	(Thailand) Nicha Lertpitaksinchai (Thailand) Peangtarn Plipuech	6–2, 6–2
2014	(United Kingdom) Jocelyn Rae (United Kingdom) Anna Smith	(Japan) Shuko Aoyama (United States) Keri Wong	6–4, 6–4
2013	(Thailand) Nicha Lertpitaksinchai (Thailand) Peangtarn Plipuech	(Israel) Julia Glushko (South Africa) Chanel Simmonds	7–6^{(7–5)}, 6–3
2012	(Japan) Shuko Aoyama (China) Xu Yifan	(Israel) Julia Glushko (Australia) Olivia Rogowska	7–5, 6–7^{(4–7)}, [10–4]
2011	(Belgium) Tamaryn Hendler (United States) Chiara Scholl	(United States) Lindsay Lee-Waters (United States) Megan Moulton-Levy	7–6^{(11–9)}, 3–6, [10–7]
2010	(Australia) Bojana Bobusic (United States) Christina Fusano	(United States) Jacqueline Cako (United States) Story Tweedie-Yates	6–4, 6–2
2009	(Chinese Taipei) Chang Kai-chen (Ukraine) Tetiana Luzhanska	(United States) Jacqueline Cako (United States) Alison Riske	6–3, 6–2
2008	(Chinese Taipei) Chan Chin-wei (United States) Kimberly Couts	(United States) Lindsay Lee-Waters (United States) Melanie Oudin	2–6, 6–3, [10–8]
2007	(Hungary) Melinda Czink (United States) Lindsay Lee-Waters	(Australia) Casey Dellacqua (South Africa) Natalie Grandin	6–2, 7–6^{(9–7)}
2006	(Chinese Taipei) Chan Chin-wei (United States) Abigail Spears	(Uzbekistan) Akgul Amanmuradova (Uzbekistan) Varvara Lepchenko	6–1, 6–1
2005	(Puerto Rico) Vilmarie Castellvi (United States) Samantha Reeves	(Japan) Kumiko Iijima (Japan) Junri Namigata	6–2, 6–1
2004	(Republic of Ireland) Claire Curran (South Africa) Natalie Grandin	(Australia) Casey Dellacqua (Australia) Nicole Sewell	7–6^{(8–6)}, 6–4
2003	(Chinese Taipei) Janet Lee (United States) Jessica Lehnhoff	(Australia) Bryanne Stewart (Australia) Christina Wheeler	6–4, 6–3
2002	(Japan) Nana Miyagi (Kazakhstan) Irina Selyutina	(Australia) Rachel McQuillan (Australia) Lisa McShea	6–7^{(2–7)}, 6–2, 7–5
2001	(Australia) Lisa McShea (Japan) Nana Miyagi	(United States) Julie Ditty (Venezuela) Milagros Sequera	6–0, 6–4
2000	(Chinese Taipei) Janet Lee (Indonesia) Wynne Prakusya	(United States) Sandra Cacic (Canada) Renata Kolbovic	6–2, 3–6, 6–2
1999	(France) Alexandra Fusai (Argentina) Florencia Labat	(South Korea) Kim Eun-ha (United Kingdom) Julie Pullin	6–4, 6–1
1998	(Australia) Amanda Grahame (Australia) Bryanne Stewart	(India) Nirupama Vaidyanathan (China) Yi Jingqian	6–4, 1–6, 6–3
1997	(United States) Elly Hakami (Australia) Danielle Jones	(Japan) Kaoru Shibata (Slovenia) Katarina Srebotnik	6–2, 7–5
↑ ITF Circuit tournament ↑

== Men's results ==
=== Singles ===
Year	Champion	Runner-up	Score
2026	(Lithuania) Edas Butvilas	(United States) Andre Ilagan	6–2, 1–6, 7–6^{(8–6)}
2025	(United States) Zachary Svajda	(Australia) Bernard Tomic	2–6, 6–3, 6–2
2024	(Brazil) João Fonseca	(Australia) Li Tu	6–1, 6–4
2023	(United States) Steve Johnson	(France) Arthur Cazaux	7–6^{(7–5)}, 6–4
2022	(China) Shang Juncheng	(Ecuador) Emilio Gómez	6–4, 6–4
2021	(Australia) Jason Kubler	(Chile) Alejandro Tabilo	7–5, 6–7^{(2–7)}, 7–5
2020	not held		
2019	(Italy) Jannik Sinner	(Australia) Alex Bolt	6–4, 3–6, 6–4
2018	(South Africa) Lloyd Harris	(Italy) Stefano Napolitano	6–4, 6–3
2017	(United States) Michael Mmoh	(Australia) John Millman	4–6, 7–6^{(7–3)}, 6–3
2016	(United States) Ernesto Escobedo	(United States) Frances Tiafoe	6–2, 6–7^{(6–8)}, 7–6^{(7–3)}
2015	(Australia) John Millman	(Japan) Yasutaka Uchiyama	6–3, 3–6, 6–4
2014	(Australia) James Duckworth	(United Kingdom) James Ward	6–3, 6–4
2013	(United Kingdom) James Ward	(Australia) James Duckworth	4–6, 6–3, 6–4
2012	(United States) Denis Kudla	(Canada) Érik Chvojka	5–7, 7–5, 6–1
2011	(United States) Wayne Odesnik	(United Kingdom) James Ward	7–5, 6–4
2010	(Australia) Carsten Ball	(United States) Jesse Levine	6–4, 7–6^{(7–1)}
2009	(Israel) Harel Levy	(United States) Alex Kuznetsov	6–4, 4–6, 6–2
2008	(India) Somdev Devvarman	(United States) Robert Kendrick	6–3, 6–3
2007	(United States) John Isner	(United States) Brian Wilson	6–7^{(7–9)}, 6–3, 6–4
2006	(South Korea) Lee Hyung-taik	(United States) Amer Delic	5–7, 6–2, 6–3
2005	(Israel) Dudi Sela	(United States) Bobby Reynolds	6–3, 3–6, 6–4
2004	(United States) Matias Boeker	(United States) Jesse Witten	6–2, 4–6, 7–6^{(7–5)}
2003	(Canada) Frank Dancevic	(Czech Republic) Petr Kralert	7–5, 6–4
2002	(Australia) Scott Draper	(United States) Paul Goldstein	4–6, 6–4, 6–4
2001	(United States) Paul Goldstein	(United States) Jack Brasington	1–6, 6–2, 6–3
2000	(Japan) Takao Suzuki	(United States) Justin Gimelstob	2–1 retired
1999	(Israel) Harel Levy	(United States) Kevin Kim	6–4, 7–6
1998	(United States) Paul Goldstein	(South Korea) Lee Hyung-taik	6–1, 6–4
1997	(Zimbabwe) Wayne Black	(Italy) Gianluca Pozzi	6–4, 6–1
1996	(United States) Steve Bryan	(Italy) Nicola Bruno	6–2, 6–4
1995	(The Bahamas) Mark Knowles	(United States) Kenny Thorne	6–4, 7–5

=== Doubles ===
Year	Champions	Runners-up	Score
2026	(Ecuador) Gonzalo Escobar (India) Niki Kaliyanda Poonacha	(United States) Andre Ilagan (United States) Karl Poling	6–7^{(1–7)}, 6–3, [11–9]
2025	(India) Anirudh Chandrasekar (India) Ramkumar Ramanathan	(Chinese Taipei) Hsu Yu-hsiou (Chinese Taipei) Huang Tsung-hao	6–4, 6–4
2024	(Sweden) André Göransson (Netherlands) Sem Verbeek	(Japan) Yuta Shimizu (Japan) James Trotter	6–4, 6–3
2023	(United States) Eliot Spizzirri (United States) Tyler Zink	(United States) George Goldhoff (United States) Vasil Kirkov	4–6, 6–3, [10–8]
2022	(India) Yuki Bhambri (India) Saketh Myneni	(Netherlands) Gijs Brouwer (United Kingdom) Aidan McHugh	3–6, 6–4, [10–8]
2021	(Canada) Liam Draxl (United States) Stefan Kozlov	(United States) Alex Rybakov (United States) Reese Stalder	6–2, 6–7^{(5–7)}, [10–7]
2020	not held		
2019	(Ecuador) Diego Hidalgo (United States) Martin Redlicki	(Venezuela) Roberto Maytín (United States) Jackson Withrow	6–2, 6–2
2018	(United States) Robert Galloway (Venezuela) Roberto Maytín	(Belgium) Joris De Loore (Australia) Marc Polmans	6–3, 6–1
2017	(Australia) Alex Bolt (Australia) Max Purcell	(France) Tom Jomby (United States) Eric Quigley	7–5, 6–4
2016	(Australia) Luke Saville (Australia) Jordan Thompson	(South Africa) Nicolaas Scholtz (South Africa) Tucker Vorster	6–2, 7–5
2015	(Australia) Carsten Ball (United Kingdom) Brydan Klein	(South Africa) Dean O'Brien (South Africa) Ruan Roelofse	6–4, 7–6^{(7–4)}
2014	(Canada) Peter Polansky (Canada) Adil Shamasdin	(Republic of Ireland) James McGee (United States) Chase Buchanan	6–4, 6–2
2013	(Canada) Frank Dancevic (Canada) Peter Polansky	(United States) Bradley Klahn (New Zealand) Michael Venus	7–5, 6–3
2012	(United States) Austin Krajicek (Australia) John Peers	(United States) Tennys Sandgren (United States) Rhyne Williams	6–1, 7–6^{(7–4)}
2011	(Australia) Jordan Kerr (United States) David Martin	(United Kingdom) James Ward (United States) Michael Yani	6–3, 6–4
2010	(South Africa) Raven Klaasen (South Africa) Izak van der Merwe	(Australia) Kaden Hensel (Australia) Adam Hubble	5–7, 6–4, [10–7]
2009	(South Africa) Kevin Anderson (United States) Ryler DeHeart	(Israel) Amir Hadad (Israel) Harel Levy	6–4, 4–6, [10–6]
2008	(Italy) Alessandro da Col (Italy) Andrea Stoppini	(France) Olivier Charroin (Canada) Erik Chvojka	6–2, 2–6, [10–8]
2007	(United States) Brendan Evans (United States) Ryan Sweeting	(United Kingdom) Ross Hutchins (United States) Phillip Simmonds	6–4, 6–4
2006	(Thailand) Sanchai Ratiwatana (Thailand) Sonchat Ratiwatana	(United States) John Isner (United States) Colin Purcell	7–6^{(7–5)}, 4–6, [10–6]
2005	(United States) Scoville Jenkins (United States) Bobby Reynolds	(South Africa) Roger Anderson (South Africa) Rik de Voest	6–4, 6–4
2004	(United States) Matias Boeker (United States) Amer Delic	(India) Harsh Mankad (United States) Jason Marshall	7–5, 6–4
2003	(Israel) Jonathan Erlich (Japan) Takao Suzuki	(United States) Matias Boeker (United States) Travis Parrott	6–4, 6–1
2002	(United States) Jack Brasington (United States) Glenn Weiner	(United States) Brandon Coupe (United States) Eric Taino	6–2, 4–6, 7–5
2001	(South Africa) John-Laffnie de Jager (South Africa) Robbie Koenig	(Australia) Paul Kilderry (United States) Jack Waite	7–6^{(7–1)}, 7–5
2000	(Switzerland) Lorenzo Manta (Italy) Laurence Tieleman	(South Africa) Grant Stafford (South Africa) Wesley Whitehouse	7–6, 7–6
1999	(United States) Michael Sell (Romania) Gabriel Trifu	(United States) Scott Humphries (United States) Kevin Kim	7–6, 6–7, 6–4
1998	(Australia) Ben Ellwood (Australia) Lleyton Hewitt	(United States) Paul Goldstein (United States) Jim Thomas	5–7, 6–3, 6–2
1997	(Zimbabwe) Wayne Black (United States) Brian MacPhie	(United States) David DiLucia (United States) Bryan Shelton	6–4, 7–5
1996	(United States) Geoff Grant (South Africa) Grant Stafford	(United States) Chad Clark (Egypt) Tamer El Sawy	7–5, 6–1
1995	(Netherlands) Fernon Wibier (United States) Chris Woodruff	(Australia) Jamie Morgan (Australia) Andrew Painter	7–5, 6–2
