= 2012 US Open – Women's singles qualifying =

Women's singles qualifying
- 2012 US Open

Events
Singles	men	women		boys	girls
Doubles	men	women	mixed	boys	girls
WC Singles	men	women	quad
WC Doubles	men	women	quad
Legends	men	women	mixed

Qualification
Singles	men	women
- US Open

Sixteen players qualified for the women's singles event in the 2012 US Open tennis championship. They were selected from 128 entrants in a three-round knockout qualifying competition.

== Seeds ==
1. (Slovakia) Magdaléna Rybáriková (qualified)
2. (Chinese Taipei) Chan Yung-jan (qualifying competition, retired)
3. (Slovakia) Jana Čepelová (qualifying competition)
4. (Greece) Eleni Daniilidou (qualifying competition, lucky loser)
5. (Spain) María Teresa Torró Flor (first round)
6. (Ukraine) Lesia Tsurenko (qualified)
7. (Czech Republic) Karolína Plíšková (second round)
8. (Chinese Taipei) Chang Kai-chen (first round)
9. (Australia) Olivia Rogowska (received wildcard to main draw)
10. (France) Aravane Rezaï (first round)
11. (Spain) Lara Arruabarrena Vecino (qualified)
12. (Portugal) Michelle Larcher de Brito (second round)
13. (Czech Republic) Eva Birnerová (first round)
14. (Argentina) Paula Ormaechea (qualifying competition)
15. (Germany) Dinah Pfizenmaier (first round)
16. (Spain) Laura Pous Tió (first round)
17. (France) Claire Feuerstein (first round)
18. (Czech Republic) Kristýna Plíšková (qualified)
19. (Japan) Erika Sema (first round)
20. (Japan) Misaki Doi (first round)
21. (Russia) Valeria Savinykh (qualifying competition)
22. (Italy) Karin Knapp (first round)
23. (Italy) Alberta Brianti (first round)
24. (Germany) Annika Beck (first round)
25. (Romania) Edina Gallovits-Hall (qualified)
26. (Belgium) Kirsten Flipkens (qualified)
27. (Switzerland) Stefanie Vögele (qualified)
28. (United States) Lauren Davis (second round)
29. (Austria) Yvonne Meusburger (second round)
30. (Portugal) Maria João Koehler (second round)
31. (United States) Alexa Glatch (qualifying competition)
32. (Germany) Tatjana Malek (qualified)

== Qualifiers ==
1. (Slovakia) Magdaléna Rybáriková
2. (Germany) Tatjana Malek
3. (Italy) Nastassja Burnett
4. (United States) Samantha Crawford
5. (Australia) Anastasia Rodionova
6. (Ukraine) Lesia Tsurenko
7. (Romania) Edina Gallovits-Hall
8. (United Kingdom) Johanna Konta
9. (Belgium) Kirsten Flipkens
10. (Israel) Julia Glushko
11. (Spain) Lara Arruabarrena Vecino
12. (Ukraine) Elina Svitolina
13. (Russia) Olga Puchkova
14. (Russia) Alla Kudryavtseva
15. (Switzerland) Stefanie Vögele
16. (Czech Republic) Kristýna Plíšková

== Lucky loser ==
1. (Greece) Eleni Daniilidou

== Draw ==
=== First qualifier ===
First round
1	(Slovakia) Magdaléna Rybáriková	4	7	6
(France) Julie Coin	6	5	3
(Netherlands) Richèl Hogenkamp	4	6	2
(Serbia) Aleksandra Krunić	6	2	6
WC	(United States) Shelby Rogers	7^{7}	6
(Australia) Monique Adamczak	6^{3}	2
(Latvia) Anastasija Sevastova	6	7^{7}
22	(Italy) Karin Knapp	4	6^{3}

Second round
1	(Slovakia) Magdaléna Rybáriková	6	6
(Serbia) Aleksandra Krunić	3	1
WC	(United States) Shelby Rogers	6^{3}	3
(Latvia) Anastasija Sevastova	7^{7}	6

Qualifying competition
1	(Slovakia) Magdaléna Rybáriková	6^{8}	7	6
(Latvia) Anastasija Sevastova	7^{10}	5	2

=== Second qualifier ===
First round
2	(Chinese Taipei) Chan Yung-jan	6	6
(Spain) Inés Ferrer Suárez	0	0
(Puerto Rico) Monica Puig	3	6	3
(Canada) Sharon Fichman	6	4	6
(Belgium) Tamaryn Hendler	6^{7}	7	6^{3}
WC	(United States) Krista Hardebeck	7^{9}	5	7^{7}
(Australia) Sacha Jones	3	4
32	(Germany) Tatjana Malek	6	6

Second round
2	(Chinese Taipei) Chan Yung-jan	4	6	6
(Canada) Sharon Fichman	6	3	3
WC	(United States) Krista Hardebeck	1	2
32	(Germany) Tatjana Malek	6	6

Qualifying competition
2	(Chinese Taipei) Chan Yung-jan	4	0^{r}
32	(Germany) Tatjana Malek	6	2

=== Third qualifier ===
First round
3	(Slovakia) Jana Čepelová	6	2	6
(United States) Grace Min	1	6	4
(Thailand) Tamarine Tanasugarn	6	0
(Germany) Sarah Gronert	1	0^{r}
(United Kingdom) Naomi Broady	4	2
(China) Xu Yifan	6	6
(Italy) Nastassja Burnett	7	7
20	(Japan) Misaki Doi	5	5

Second round
3	(Slovakia) Jana Čepelová	6	5	6
(Thailand) Tamarine Tanasugarn	3	7	4
(China) Xu Yifan	6	0	2
(Italy) Nastassja Burnett	3	6	6

Qualifying competition
3	(Slovakia) Jana Čepelová	3	3
(Italy) Nastassja Burnett	6	6

=== Fourth qualifier ===
First round
4	(Greece) Eleni Daniilidou	7^{8}	6
(Austria) Patricia Mayr-Achleitner	6^{6}	1
(Canada) Stéphanie Dubois	6	7^{7}
(Romania) Mihaela Buzărnescu	0	6^{3}
WC	(United States) Samantha Crawford	6	6
(Russia) Irina Khromacheva	4	1
(Canada) Marie-Ève Pelletier	6	3	7
17	(France) Claire Feuerstein	4	6	5

Second round
4	(Greece) Eleni Daniilidou	7^{7}	6
(Canada) Stéphanie Dubois	6^{4}	1
WC	(United States) Samantha Crawford	6	3	6
(Canada) Marie-Ève Pelletier	1	6	4

Qualifying competition
4	(Greece) Eleni Daniilidou	3	6	4
WC	(United States) Samantha Crawford	6	1	6

=== Fifth qualifier ===
First round
5	(Spain) María Teresa Torró Flor	6	2	3
(Bulgaria) Elitsa Kostova	4	6	6
(Paraguay) Verónica Cepede Royg	4	6	6
(Argentina) Florencia Molinero	6	3	3
(United States) Tetiana Luzhanska	0	2
(Australia) Anastasia Rodionova	6	6
(France) Caroline Garcia	6	6^{5}	7
23	(Italy) Alberta Brianti	2	7^{7}	5

Second round
(Bulgaria) Elitsa Kostova	4	6	3
(Paraguay) Verónica Cepede Royg	6	3	6
(Australia) Anastasia Rodionova	6	6
(France) Caroline Garcia	2	4

Qualifying competition
(Paraguay) Verónica Cepede Royg	1	2
(Australia) Anastasia Rodionova	6	6

=== Sixth qualifier ===
First round
6	(Ukraine) Lesia Tsurenko	6	6
(Romania) Elena Bogdan	2	0
(Georgia (country)) Margalita Chakhnashvili	2	5
(Serbia) Vesna Dolonc	6	7
WC	(United States) Chalena Scholl	3	6^{6}
(South Africa) Chanel Simmonds	6	7^{8}
(France) Irena Pavlovic	6	5	7^{7}
24	(Germany) Annika Beck	0	7	6^{5}

Second round
6	(Ukraine) Lesia Tsurenko	6	6
(Serbia) Vesna Dolonc	2	3
(South Africa) Chanel Simmonds	7^{7}	3	3
(France) Irena Pavlovic	6^{4}	6	6

Qualifying competition
6	(Ukraine) Lesia Tsurenko	6	6^{7}	6
(France) Irena Pavlovic	2	7^{9}	2

=== Seventh qualifier ===
First round
7	(Czech Republic) Karolína Plíšková	6	6
(Peru) Bianca Botto	4	2
(Russia) Marta Sirotkina	0	2
(Croatia) Donna Vekić	6	6
(Argentina) María Irigoyen	4	6^{6}
(Japan) Yurika Sema	6	7^{8}
(Ukraine) Valentyna Ivakhnenko	4	2
25	(Romania) Edina Gallovits-Hall	6	6

Second round
7	(Czech Republic) Karolína Plíšková	1	2
(Croatia) Donna Vekić	6	6
(Japan) Yurika Sema	6	5	1
25	(Romania) Edina Gallovits-Hall	2	7	6

Qualifying competition
(Croatia) Donna Vekić	6	4	0
25	(Romania) Edina Gallovits-Hall	2	6	6

=== Eighth qualifier ===
First round
8	(Chinese Taipei) Chang Kai-chen	3	6^{5}
(United Kingdom) Johanna Konta	6	7^{7}
(Japan) Kurumi Nara	6	4	6
(Germany) Kathrin Wörle	4	6	3
(Italy) Anna Floris	1	7^{9}	7
(Kazakhstan) Yulia Putintseva	6	6^{7}	5
(China) Zhang Shuai	6	6
19	(Japan) Erika Sema	1	1

Second round
(United Kingdom) Johanna Konta	7	6
(Japan) Kurumi Nara	5	2
(Italy) Anna Floris	1	0
(China) Zhang Shuai	6	6

Qualifying competition
(United Kingdom) Johanna Konta	6	3	7
(China) Zhang Shuai	4	6	5

=== Ninth qualifier ===
First round
Alt	(Colombia) Catalina Castaño	6	6
(Netherlands) Bibiane Schoofs	4	4
(United States) Jessica Pegula	7	6
(Croatia) Tereza Mrdeža	5	3
(China) Duan Yingying	6	6
(Hungary) Réka-Luca Jani	1	2
(Spain) Estrella Cabeza Candela	6	6^{5}	2
26	(Belgium) Kirsten Flipkens	2	7^{7}	6

Second round
Alt	(Colombia) Catalina Castaño	2	6	6
(United States) Jessica Pegula	6	4	0
(China) Duan Yingying	2	2
26	(Belgium) Kirsten Flipkens	6	6

Qualifying competition
Alt	(Colombia) Catalina Castaño	6^{5}	6^{5}
26	(Belgium) Kirsten Flipkens	7^{7}	7^{7}

=== Tenth qualifier ===
First round
10	(France) Aravane Rezaï	4	6^{6}
(China) Zheng Saisai	6	7^{8}
WC	(United States) Brooke Austin	3	6	6
PR	(Croatia) Ivana Lisjak	6	4	4
(Israel) Julia Glushko	6	2	6
(Poland) Marta Domachowska	2	6	3
(United States) Alison Riske	2	6	2
28	(United States) Lauren Davis	6	3	6

Second round
(China) Zheng Saisai	6	6
WC	(United States) Brooke Austin	4	2
(Israel) Julia Glushko	2	6	6
28	(United States) Lauren Davis	6	4	3

Qualifying competition
(China) Zheng Saisai	3	3
(Israel) Julia Glushko	6	6

=== Eleventh qualifier ===
First round
11	(Spain) Lara Arruabarrena Vecino	4	7^{7}	6
WC	(United States) Julia Boserup	6	6^{5}	3
WC	(United States) Ashley Weinhold	2	5
(Turkey) Çağla Büyükakçay	6	7
(Ukraine) Yuliya Beygelzimer	5	1
(Liechtenstein) Stephanie Vogt	7	6
(Japan) Junri Namigata	3	2
31	(United States) Alexa Glatch	6	6

Second round
11	(Spain) Lara Arruabarrena Vecino	7^{8}	6
(Turkey) Çağla Büyükakçay	6^{6}	2
(Liechtenstein) Stephanie Vogt	4	2
31	(United States) Alexa Glatch	6	6

Qualifying competition
11	(Spain) Lara Arruabarrena Vecino	6	6
31	(United States) Alexa Glatch	2	4

=== Twelfth qualifier ===
First round
12	(Portugal) Michelle Larcher de Brito	4	6	7
PR	(Belarus) Ekaterina Dzehalevich	6	3	5
(Ukraine) Elina Svitolina	7^{10}	7
(Ukraine) Olga Savchuk	6^{8}	5
WC	(United States) Alexandra Mueller	5	4
PR	(Spain) Beatriz García Vidagany	7	6
(Switzerland) Amra Sadiković	3	2
21	(Russia) Valeria Savinykh	6	6

Second round
12	(Portugal) Michelle Larcher de Brito	6	5	3
(Ukraine) Elina Svitolina	2	7	6
PR	(Spain) Beatriz García Vidagany	6	3	3
21	(Russia) Valeria Savinykh	2	6	6

Qualifying competition
(Ukraine) Elina Svitolina	3	6	6
21	(Russia) Valeria Savinykh	6	4	1

=== Thirteenth qualifier ===
First round
13	(Czech Republic) Eva Birnerová	3	2
(Russia) Olga Puchkova	6	6
(United States) Gail Brodsky	2	1
(Russia) Elena Bovina	6	6
(Bulgaria) Dia Evtimova	7	6
WC	(United States) Alexandra Kiick	5	4
(Romania) Raluca Olaru	1	2
29	(Austria) Yvonne Meusburger	6	6

Second round
(Russia) Olga Puchkova	2	7^{7}	6
(Russia) Elena Bovina	6	6^{5}	4
(Bulgaria) Dia Evtimova	3	6	6
29	(Austria) Yvonne Meusburger	6	3	4

Qualifying competition
(Russia) Olga Puchkova	6	7
(Bulgaria) Dia Evtimova	0	5

=== Fourteenth qualifier ===
First round
14	(Argentina) Paula Ormaechea	6	6
(Japan) Aiko Nakamura	2	2
(United States) Madison Brengle	3	2
(United States) Madison Keys	6	6
(Russia) Alla Kudryavtseva	6	6
(United States) Jill Craybas	1	2
(Brazil) Teliana Pereira	3	6	6^{5}
30	(Portugal) Maria João Koehler	6	3	7^{7}

Second round
14	(Argentina) Paula Ormaechea	6	6
(United States) Madison Keys	4	2
(Russia) Alla Kudryavtseva	6	7^{7}
30	(Portugal) Maria João Koehler	4	6^{5}

Qualifying competition
14	(Argentina) Paula Ormaechea	6	2	1
(Russia) Alla Kudryavtseva	2	6	6

=== Fifteenth qualifier ===
First round
15	(Germany) Dinah Pfizenmaier	5	4
(Canada) Heidi El Tabakh	7	6
(United States) Chichi Scholl	7^{8}	6
(Poland) Sandra Zaniewska	6^{6}	2
(Russia) Ekaterina Bychkova	6	6
(Thailand) Noppawan Lertcheewakarn	2	4
(Slovenia) Petra Rampre	6	1	4
27	(Switzerland) Stefanie Vögele	1	6	6

Second round
(Canada) Heidi El Tabakh	6	6
(United States) Chichi Scholl	2	1
(Russia) Ekaterina Bychkova	5	3
27	(Switzerland) Stefanie Vögele	7	6

Qualifying competition
(Canada) Heidi El Tabakh	4	3
27	(Switzerland) Stefanie Vögele	6	6

=== Sixteenth qualifier ===
First round
16	(Spain) Laura Pous Tió	6^{1}	1
(United States) Maria Sanchez	7^{7}	6
(Italy) Maria Elena Camerin	4	2
(Romania) Cristina Mitu	6	6
(France) Victoria Larrière	6	6
(Russia) Ekaterina Ivanova	3	1
(Belarus) Anastasiya Yakimova	4	1
18	(Czech Republic) Kristýna Plíšková	6	6

Second round
(United States) Maria Sanchez	6	3	6
(Romania) Cristina Mitu	3	6	1
(France) Victoria Larrière	2	0
18	(Czech Republic) Kristýna Plíšková	6	6

Qualifying competition
(United States) Maria Sanchez	3	6^{4}
18	(Czech Republic) Kristýna Plíšková	6	7^{7}
