= 2012 US Open – Men's singles qualifying =

Men's singles qualifying
- 2012 US Open

Events
Singles	men	women		boys	girls
Doubles	men	women	mixed	boys	girls
WC Singles	men	women	quad
WC Doubles	men	women	quad
Legends	men	women	mixed
- US Open

== Seeds ==
1. (Netherlands) Igor Sijsling (qualified)
2. (Slovenia) Aljaž Bedene (second round)
3. (Lithuania) Ričardas Berankis (qualifying competition)
4. (Czech Republic) Lukáš Rosol (qualifying competition)
5. (Spain) Roberto Bautista-Agut (qualifying competition)
6. (Slovenia) Grega Žemlja (qualified)
7. (Canada) Vasek Pospisil (first round)
8. (Argentina) Horacio Zeballos (first round)
9. (France) Florent Serra (qualifying round, lucky loser)
10. (Portugal) Frederico Gil (first round)
11. (Germany) Matthias Bachinger (qualified)
12. (Germany) Michael Berrer (second round)
13. (Belgium) Ruben Bemelmans (second round)
14. (Portugal) João Sousa (first round)
15. (Germany) Daniel Brands (qualified)
16. (Canada) Frank Dancevic (first round)
17. (Argentina) Federico Delbonis (first round)
18. (Switzerland) Marco Chiudinelli (first round, retired)
19. (Croatia) Antonio Veić (first round)
20. (United States) Wayne Odesnik (second round)
21. (Germany) Dustin Brown (second round)
22. (Brazil) Thiago Alves (first round)
23. (Argentina) Martín Alund (first round)
24. (Slovakia) Karol Beck (qualified)
25. (Russia) Dmitry Tursunov (qualifying competition, retired)
26. (Spain) Iñigo Cervantes Huegun (second round)
27. (France) Josselin Ouanna (qualifying competition)
28. (Portugal) Gastão Elias (first round)
29. (Ukraine) Sergei Bubka (qualifying competition)
30. (United States) Bobby Reynolds (qualified)
31. (Argentina) Guido Pella (qualified)
32. (Thailand) Danai Udomchoke (first round)

== Qualifiers ==
1. (Netherlands) Igor Sijsling
2. (Japan) Hiroki Moriya
3. (United States) Tim Smyczek
4. (Argentina) Guido Pella
5. (Slovakia) Karol Beck
6. (Slovenia) Grega Žemlja
7. (United States) Rhyne Williams
8. (Belgium) Maxime Authom
9. (United States) Bradley Klahn
10. (Argentina) Guido Andreozzi
11. (Germany) Matthias Bachinger
12. (United States) Bobby Reynolds
13. (Chinese Taipei) Jimmy Wang
14. (Brazil) Ricardo Mello
15. (Germany) Daniel Brands
16. (Russia) Teymuraz Gabashvili

== Draw ==
=== First qualifier ===
First round
1	(Netherlands) Igor Sijsling	6	6
(Argentina) Máximo González	3	2
(Moldova) Radu Albot	7	6^{1}	6
(Belarus) Uladzimir Ignatik	5	7^{7}	2
(France) Vincent Millot	6	6
(Brazil) João Souza	4	2
(Chinese Taipei) Chen Ti	4	1
27	(France) Josselin Ouanna	6	6

Second round
1	(Netherlands) Igor Sijsling	6	6
(Moldova) Radu Albot	4	3
(France) Vincent Millot	6	2	4
27	(France) Josselin Ouanna	2	6	6

Qualifying competition
1	(Netherlands) Igor Sijsling	6	6
27	(France) Josselin Ouanna	3	4

=== Second qualifier ===
First round
2	(Slovenia) Aljaž Bedene	6	6
(China) Zhang Ze	2	4
WC	(United States) Daniel Kosakowski	6	6
(Netherlands) Jesse Huta Galung	4	2
(Japan) Hiroki Moriya	6	6
WC	(France) Clément Reix	1	3
(Brazil) Guilherme Clezar	1	4
20	(United States) Wayne Odesnik	6	6

Second round
2	(Slovenia) Aljaž Bedene	3	6	6^{7}
WC	(United States) Daniel Kosakowski	6	3	7^{9}
(Japan) Hiroki Moriya	3	6	7
20	(United States) Wayne Odesnik	6	1	5

Qualifying competition
WC	(United States) Daniel Kosakowski	6	6^{5}	3
(Japan) Hiroki Moriya	4	7^{7}	6

=== Third qualifier ===
First round
3	(Lithuania) Ričardas Berankis	5	7^{7}	6
(France) Maxime Teixeira	7	6^{5}	1
(Colombia) Robert Farah	3	6	6
(Austria) Martin Fischer	6	1	4
(Finland) Harri Heliövaara	2	6^{3}
(United States) Tim Smyczek	6	7^{7}
(Germany) Peter Torebko	4	2
21	(Germany) Dustin Brown	6	6

Second round
3	(Lithuania) Ričardas Berankis	2	7^{9}	7
(Colombia) Robert Farah	6	6^{7}	5
(United States) Tim Smyczek	6	6
21	(Germany) Dustin Brown	4	4

Qualifying competition
3	(Lithuania) Ričardas Berankis	7^{7}	5	4
(United States) Tim Smyczek	6^{4}	7	6

=== Fourth qualifier ===
First round
4	(Czech Republic) Lukáš Rosol	6	6
(Slovakia) Kamil Čapkovič	4	2
(Colombia) Alejandro González	6	4	6
(Uzbekistan) Farrukh Dustov	2	6	3
WC	(United States) Tennys Sandgren	6	6^{3}	7
PR	(Croatia) Franko Škugor	3	7^{7}	5
(United States) Michael Yani	3	6^{5}
31	(Argentina) Guido Pella	6	7^{7}

Second round
4	(Czech Republic) Lukáš Rosol	7	6
(Colombia) Alejandro González	5	2
WC	(United States) Tennys Sandgren	4	2
31	(Argentina) Guido Pella	6	6

Qualifying competition
4	(Czech Republic) Lukáš Rosol	3	3
31	(Argentina) Guido Pella	6	6

=== Fifth qualifier ===
First round
5	(Spain) Roberto Bautista-Agut	6	6
(Czech Republic) Marek Michalička	3	4
(Israel) Amir Weintraub	6	6
(France) Mathieu Rodrigues	3	2
(Australia) Brydan Klein	6	6^{5}	7
WC	(United States) Alexios Halebian	2	7^{7}	5
(United States) Alex Kuznetsov	7	3	4
24	(Slovakia) Karol Beck	5	6	6

Second round
5	(Spain) Roberto Bautista-Agut	7^{7}	7^{7}
(Israel) Amir Weintraub	6^{5}	6^{5}
(Australia) Brydan Klein	1	6	4
24	(Slovakia) Karol Beck	6	4	6

Qualifying competition
5	(Spain) Roberto Bautista-Agut	3	1
24	(Slovakia) Karol Beck	6	6

=== Sixth qualifier ===
First round
6	(Slovenia) Grega Žemlja	6	6
WC	(United States) Christian Harrison	3	4
(Czech Republic) Jan Hernych	6^{4}	6	4
(Netherlands) Matwé Middelkoop	7^{7}	3	6
(Japan) Yuichi Sugita	4	1
(Belgium) Yannick Mertens	6	6
(Spain) Adrián Menéndez-Maceiras	6	7
32	(Thailand) Danai Udomchoke	4	5

Second round
6	(Slovenia) Grega Žemlja	7	6
(Netherlands) Matwé Middelkoop	5	3
(Belgium) Yannick Mertens	7	6
(Spain) Adrián Menéndez-Maceiras	5	0

Qualifying competition
6	(Slovenia) Grega Žemlja	6	6
(Belgium) Yannick Mertens	1	3

=== Seventh qualifier ===
First round
7	(Canada) Vasek Pospisil	3	4
WC	(United States) Rhyne Williams	6	6
(Argentina) Agustín Velotti	4	2
(Kazakhstan) Andrey Golubev	6	6
(France) Jonathan Dasnières de Veigy	3	0
(Germany) Peter Gojowczyk	6	6
(Austria) Philipp Oswald	4	4
26	(Spain) Iñigo Cervantes Huegun	6	6

Second round
WC	(United States) Rhyne Williams	7^{7}	6
(Kazakhstan) Andrey Golubev	6^{5}	2
(Germany) Peter Gojowczyk	6	6
26	(Spain) Iñigo Cervantes Huegun	3	4

Qualifying competition
WC	(United States) Rhyne Williams	6	6
(Germany) Peter Gojowczyk	3	2

=== Eighth qualifier ===
First round
8	(Argentina) Horacio Zeballos	6	3	6^{5}
(India) Yuki Bhambri	4	6	7^{7}
(Italy) Matteo Viola	2	4
(Belgium) Maxime Authom	6	6
(Argentina) Facundo Bagnis	7	6
(Brazil) Júlio Silva	5	3
(Canada) Peter Polansky	6	6
22	(Brazil) Thiago Alves	4	3

Second round
(India) Yuki Bhambri	3	6	3
(Belgium) Maxime Authom	6	3	6
(Argentina) Facundo Bagnis	4	4
(Canada) Peter Polansky	6	6

Qualifying competition
(Belgium) Maxime Authom	6	6
(Canada) Peter Polansky	0	2

=== Ninth qualifier ===
First round
9	(France) Florent Serra	6	7^{7}
(Colombia) Carlos Salamanca	2	6^{2}
(Brazil) Leonardo Kirche	6^{4}	6	6
(Czech Republic) Ivo Minář	7^{7}	3	2
WC	(United States) Bradley Klahn	6	6
(Argentina) Diego Junqueira	3	2
(Argentina) Marco Trungelliti	6	1
18	(Switzerland) Marco Chiudinelli	1	0^{r}

Second round
9	(France) Florent Serra	7^{7}	6
(Brazil) Leonardo Kirche	6^{3}	4
WC	(United States) Bradley Klahn	6	7^{7}
(Argentina) Marco Trungelliti	4	6^{2}

Qualifying competition
9	(France) Florent Serra	4	4
WC	(United States) Bradley Klahn	6	6

=== Tenth qualifier ===
First round
10	(Portugal) Frederico Gil	5	4
(France) Pierre-Hugues Herbert	7	6
(United Kingdom) Josh Goodall	3	2
(Argentina) Guido Andreozzi	6	6
(Germany) Stefan Seifert	6^{2}	6	6
(France) Grégoire Burquier	7^{7}	2	2
(Ecuador) Júlio César Campozano	3	6	3
29	(Ukraine) Sergei Bubka	6	3	6

Second round
(France) Pierre-Hugues Herbert	6^{4}	0
(Argentina) Guido Andreozzi	7^{7}	6
(Germany) Stefan Seifert	3	5
29	(Ukraine) Sergei Bubka	6	7

Qualifying competition
(Argentina) Guido Andreozzi	7	6
29	(Ukraine) Sergei Bubka	5	4

=== Eleventh qualifier ===
First round
11	(Germany) Matthias Bachinger	3	7	6
(Spain) Arnau Brugués-Davi	6	5	4
(Germany) Mischa Zverev	6	6
(Turkey) Marsel İlhan	1	3
(France) Adrian Mannarino	6	3	6
(Canada) Érik Chvojka	4	6	3
(Germany) Dominik Meffert	6	6
28	(Portugal) Gastão Elias	4	0

Second round
11	(Germany) Matthias Bachinger	6	6
(Germany) Mischa Zverev	4	2
(France) Adrian Mannarino	6	6^{7}	6
(Germany) Dominik Meffert	3	7^{9}	3

Qualifying competition
11	(Germany) Matthias Bachinger	7^{7}	6
(France) Adrian Mannarino	6^{4}	3

=== Twelfth qualifier ===
First round
12	(Germany) Michael Berrer	6	6
(Netherlands) Thomas Schoorel	3	1
(Spain) Sergio Gutiérrez Ferrol	1	6	6
(Czech Republic) Jan Mertl	6	2	4
(United States) Chase Buchanan	5	5
(Australia) James Duckworth	7	7
(Ukraine) Illya Marchenko	2	5
30	(United States) Bobby Reynolds	6	7

Second round
12	(Germany) Michael Berrer	6	5	4
(Spain) Sergio Gutiérrez Ferrol	2	7	6
(Australia) James Duckworth	4	6	5
30	(United States) Bobby Reynolds	6	3	7

Qualifying competition
(Spain) Sergio Gutiérrez Ferrol	6^{5}	3
30	(United States) Bobby Reynolds	7^{7}	6

=== Thirteenth qualifier ===
First round
13	(Belgium) Ruben Bemelmans	4	6	6
(Ukraine) Ivan Sergeyev	6	4	3
(Italy) Gianluca Naso	2	1
(Romania) Marius Copil	6	6
(France) Nicolas Devilder	6	7^{7}
(Netherlands) Boy Westerhof	4	6^{5}
(Chinese Taipei) Jimmy Wang	7^{7}	6
17	(Argentina) Federico Delbonis	6^{1}	3

Second round
13	(Belgium) Ruben Bemelmans	4	4
(Romania) Marius Copil	6	6
(France) Nicolas Devilder	3	4
(Chinese Taipei) Jimmy Wang	6	6

Qualifying competition
(Romania) Marius Copil	6	1	6^{3}
(Chinese Taipei) Jimmy Wang	4	6	7^{7}

=== Fourteenth qualifier ===
First round
14	(Portugal) João Sousa	3	7^{7}	2
(Brazil) Ricardo Mello	6	6^{4}	6
(Italy) Alessandro Giannessi	6	7
(Dominican Republic) Víctor Estrella	3	5
(South Africa) Rik De Voest	6	3	6
(South Africa) Izak Van Der Merwe	4	6	4
WC	(United States) Mitchell Krueger	6	6
23	(Argentina) Martín Alund	3	3

Second round
(Brazil) Ricardo Mello	6	6
(Italy) Alessandro Giannessi	4	3
(South Africa) Rik De Voest	4	6	6
WC	(United States) Mitchell Krueger	6	3	4

Qualifying competition
(Brazil) Ricardo Mello	6	7^{7}
(South Africa) Rik De Voest	1	6^{5}

=== Fifteenth qualifier ===
First round
15	(Germany) Daniel Brands	4	6	6
(Netherlands) Thiemo de Bakker	6	3	4
(Chile) Paul Capdeville	7^{7}	6
(Australia) John-Patrick Smith	6^{4}	3
(Austria) Andreas Haider-Maurer	2	5
(France) Laurent Rochette	6	7
(United Kingdom) James Ward	3	6	4
25	(Russia) Dmitry Tursunov	6	2	6

Second round
15	(Germany) Daniel Brands	6	3	6
(Chile) Paul Capdeville	4	6	3
(France) Laurent Rochette	1	5
25	(Russia) Dmitry Tursunov	6	7

Qualifying competition
15	(Germany) Daniel Brands	6
25	(Russia) Dmitry Tursunov	5^{r}

=== Sixteenth qualifier ===
First round
16	(Canada) Frank Dancevic	6	5	2
(Russia) Teymuraz Gabashvili	3	7	6
(Portugal) Pedro Sousa	2	5
(Germany) Simon Greul	6	7
(Bosnia and Herzegovina) Damir Džumhur	6	4	4
(France) Marc Gicquel	3	6	6
(Chinese Taipei) Yang Tsung-hua	6	6
19	(Croatia) Antonio Veić	4	3

Second round
(Russia) Teymuraz Gabashvili	6	3	7
(Germany) Simon Greul	2	6	5
(France) Marc Gicquel	7^{9}	4	5
(Chinese Taipei) Yang Tsung-hua	6^{7}	6	7

Qualifying competition
(Russia) Teymuraz Gabashvili	6	3	6
(Chinese Taipei) Yang Tsung-hua	4	6	3
