= Taylor Townsend =

American tennis player (born 1996)

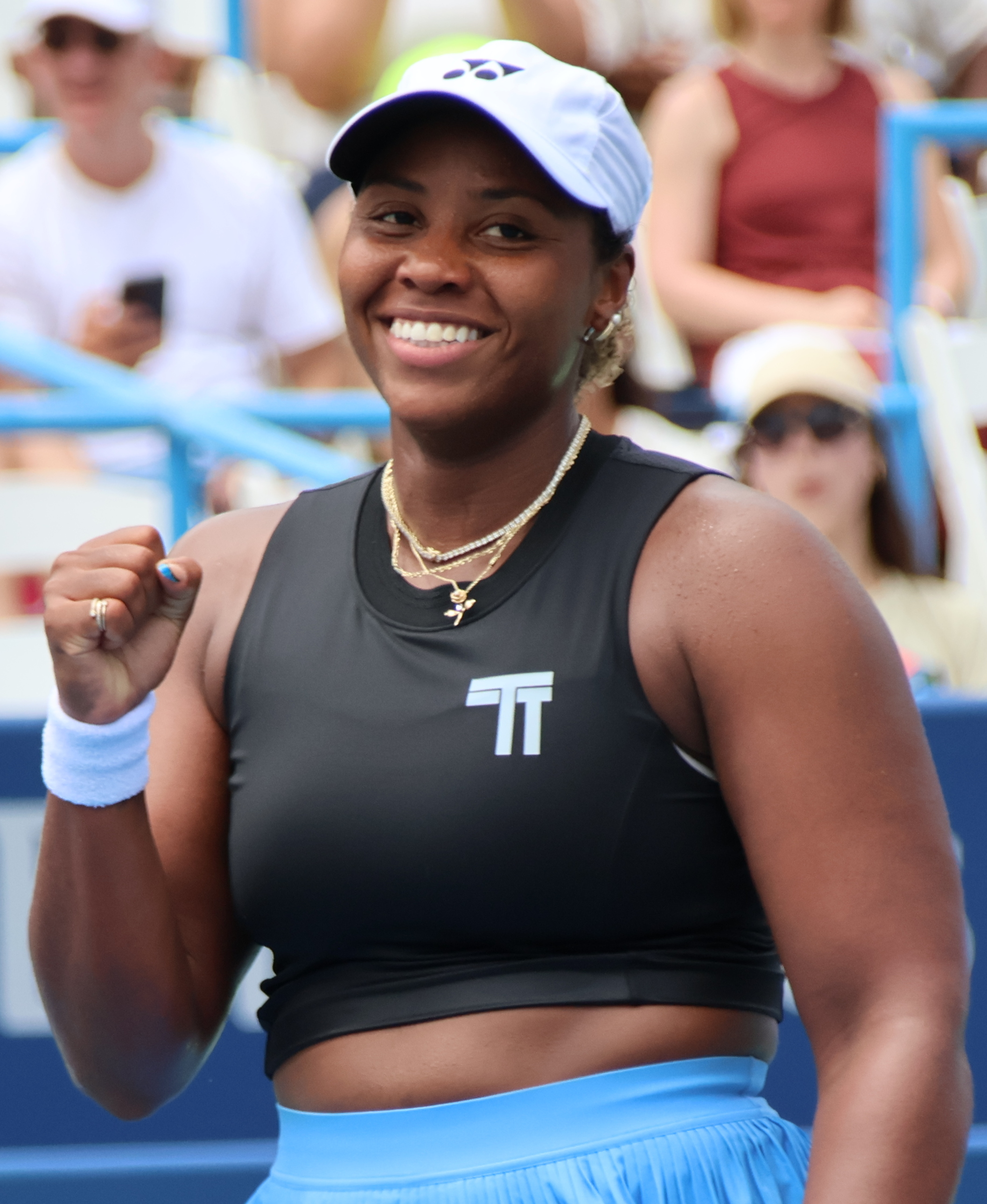
- Townsend at the 2025 Washington Open
- Country (sports): United States
- Residence: Smyrna, Georgia, US
- Born: April 16, 1996 (age 30) Chicago, Illinois, US
- Height: 1.70 m (5 ft 7 in)
- Turned pro: December 2012
- Plays: Left-handed (two-handed backhand)
- Prize money: US$ 10,653,279

Singles
- Career record: 330–202
- Career titles: 0
- Highest ranking: No. 46 (August 19, 2024)
- Current ranking: No. 92 (November 16, 2026)

Grand Slam singles results
- Australian Open: 2R (2020, 2023)
- French Open: 3R (2014)
- Wimbledon: 2R (2018, 2019)
- US Open: 4R (2019, 2025, 2026)

Doubles
- Career record: 319–106
- Career titles: 18
- Highest ranking: No. 1 (July 28, 2025)
- Current ranking: No. 2 (November 16, 2026)

Grand Slam doubles results
- Australian Open: W (2025)
- French Open: W (2026)
- Wimbledon: W (2024)
- US Open: W (2026)

Other doubles tournaments
- Tour Finals: W (2026)

Grand Slam mixed doubles results
- Australian Open: SF (2026)
- French Open: F (2025)
- Wimbledon: QF (2024)
- US Open: F (2024)

Team competitions
- BJK Cup: SF (2025)
- Last updated on: October 6, 2026.

Taylor Townsend (born April 16, 1996) is an American professional tennis player, who specializes in doubles. She has been ranked world No. 1 in women's doubles by the Women's Tennis Association (WTA). Townsend has won 18 WTA Tour–level doubles titles, including four majors to complete the career Grand Slam, as well as the 2026 WTA Finals (all partnering Kateřina Siniaková).

Townsend has also reached three other major doubles finals, at the 2022 US Open (with Caty McNally), the 2023 French Open (with Leylah Fernandez), and the 2025 US Open (with Siniaková). She has a career-high singles ranking of No. 46, achieved in August 2024.

As a junior, Townsend was named the 2012 Junior World Champion and reached world No. 1 in the girls' rankings, the first American to do so since 1982. It came after she won the 2012 Australian Open junior titles in both singles and doubles, as well as the Wimbledon and US Open doubles titles. Townsend turned professional by the end of 2012 and entered the top 100 in singles in 2015.

Known as one of the WTA Tour's few players to frequently employ serve-and-volley tactics in her singles gameplay, Townsend first entered the top 100 in doubles in 2016, after winning eight of ten finals reached on the ITF Women's World Tennis Tour that year. Following her return to the sport in 2022 after maternity leave, she reached her first major final at the 2022 US Open. In 2023, she made her top five debut in the doubles rankings. She subsequently reached the No. 1 ranking in 2025 after consistently playing with Siniaková, with championships at the 2024 Wimbledon Championships and the 2025 Australian Open. Her success continued into 2026, with titles at the French Open and US Open to complete the career Grand Slam, as well as the WTA Finals.

== Personal life and background ==
Townsend was born in Chicago to Gary and Sheila (née Jones). Her parents are both high school administrators, and her mother used to work as a banker. Sheila played Division II tennis at Lincoln University in Missouri. Townsend has an older sister, Symone, who played college tennis at Florida A&M.

Townsend started playing tennis at the age of six, and was one of the first junior players to participate in the XS Tennis program run by Kamau Murray. Murray is better known for coaching Sloane Stephens to a Grand Slam title. When Townsend was eight years old, she moved to Atlanta to continue training with Donald Young's father. Townsend's mother is a close friend of Donald Young Sr., as they grew up together on the South Side of Chicago, where they trained at the same tennis center.

At age 14, Townsend moved to Boca Raton, Florida, to join the USTA development program. When the USTA decided not to fund Townsend's expenses to compete at the 2012 US Open, Murray and XS Tennis organized a fundraiser to cover nearly $1000 of the cost of the trip. After that, Townsend split time training with Murray in Chicago and Zina Garrison in the Washington, D.C. area. Townsend tries to model her game after her tennis idol, Martina Navratilova.

On October 14, 2020, Townsend announced via social media that she was pregnant. She gave birth to her son, Adyn Aubrey, on March 14, 2021.

== Juniors ==
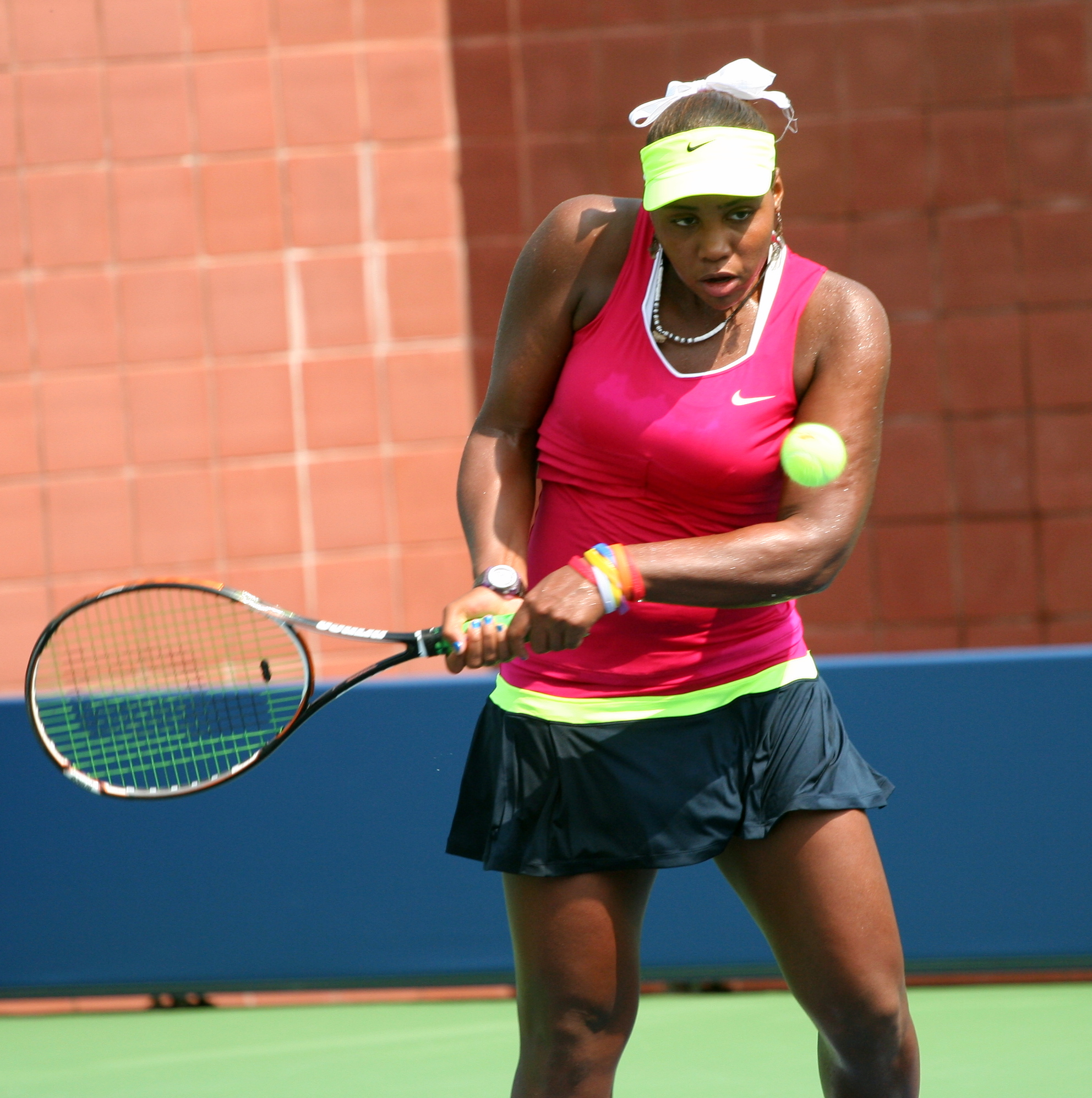
Townsend at 2012 US Open

Townsend won the 2012 Australian Open singles junior tournament at the age of 15 to become only the second American to ever win that title after Kim Kessaris in 1989. She also won the doubles title at the same event to become first American to win both the singles and doubles titles at a junior Grand Slam event since Lindsay Davenport accomplished the feat at the 1992 US Open. A few months later, Townsend won the Easter Bowl to help complete her rise to No. 1 in the ITF junior rankings before the end of April.

Townsend continued her major success in doubles that year by winning the Wimbledon girls' doubles title with Eugenie Bouchard and the US Open title with Gabrielle Andrews, with whom she also partnered at the Australian Open. The only major that eluded Townsend was the French Open, where she lost in the semifinals while partnering with Bouchard. Additionally, she was able to win the US Open title in spite of being asked to sit out that tournament by the USTA over fitness concerns. This was only the seventh year where a player or team was able to win three out of four Grand Slam doubles titles, with senior Grand Slam tournament champions Victoria Azarenka and Sloane Stephens among the others to complete this task. Townsend finished the season as the No. 1 ranked junior in the world, for which she was named the 2012 ITF Junior World Champion. She became the first American girl to hold this honor since Gretchen Rush in 1982.

She continued to play on the junior tour in 2013 and reached another major singles final at Wimbledon, this time losing to Belinda Bencic. She also competed in the USTA Junior National Championship as the fourth seed and was knocked out in the semifinals by No. 2, Allie Kiick.

== Professional ==
=== 2010–13: Early years: WTA Tour doubles final ===
Townsend entered her first professional-level tournament in October 2010 at the age of 14 and was able to win her first career match. She also played in the doubles event at the 2011 US Open when she was 15 years old and reached the third round with compatriot Jessica Pegula. She also received a wildcard into the singles qualifying draw and defeated world No. 122, Arantxa Parra Santonja, in the first round. The following year, Townsend requested another wildcard into the US Open and was declined because of the USTA's concerns about her fitness. The USTA received widespread criticism for this decision.

Townsend made her WTA Tour debut in singles at the 2013 Indian Wells Open, where she defeated Lucie Hradecká for her first tour-level match win. Her next tour main-draw appearance came at the Washington Open. After Townsend lost in singles, she competed in the doubles event with Eugenie Bouchard, her doubles partner from their Wimbledon girls' doubles title the previous summer. The duo made it all the way to the final, the first career final for either player.

=== 2014: First major match wins ===
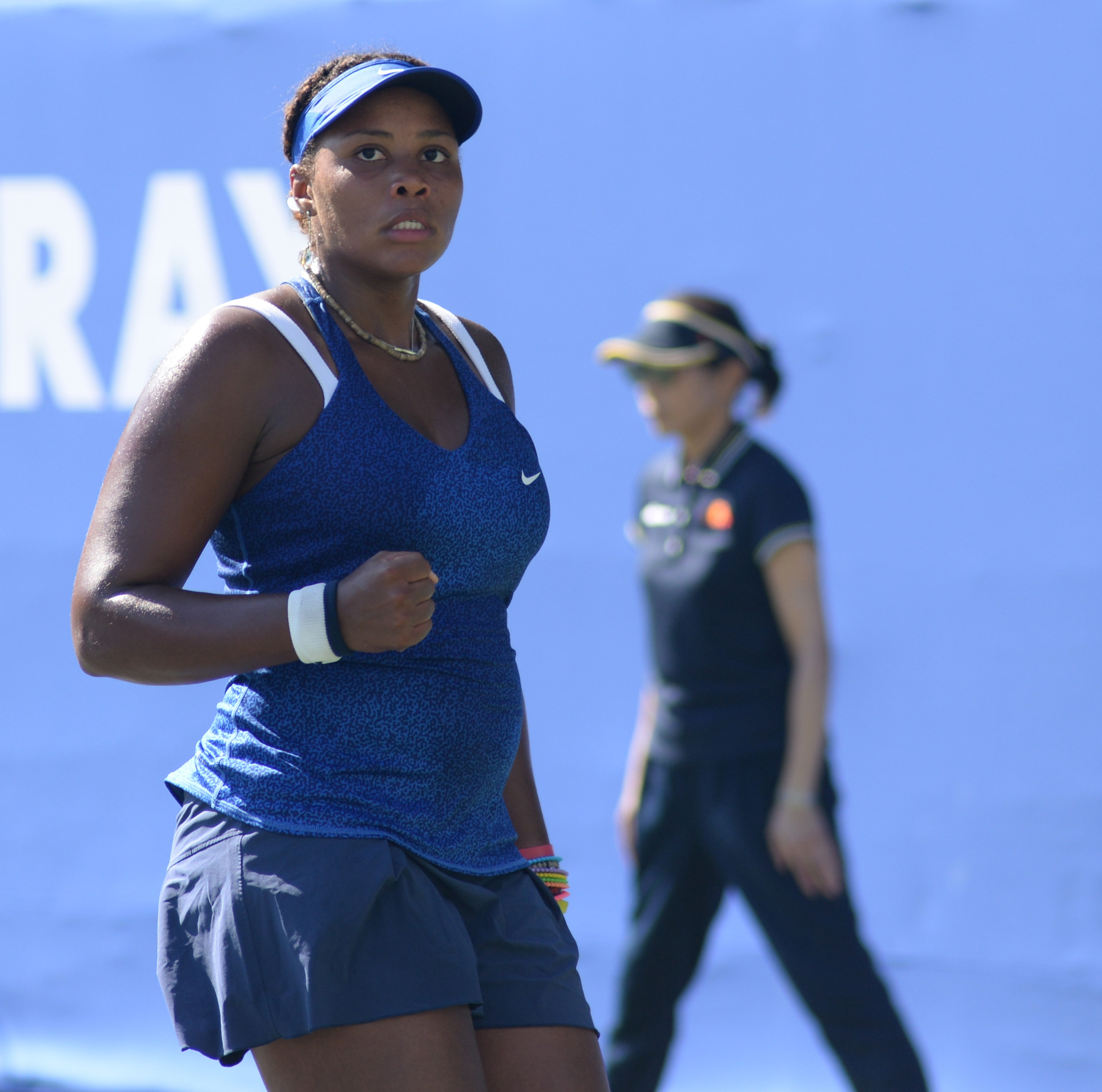
Townsend at the 2014 Pan Pacific Open

In back-to-back weeks in the spring, Townsend played at two clay-court events on the USTA pro circuit at Charlottesville and Indian Harbour Beach. She won both the singles and doubles titles at each of these events, her first such ITF titles. Townsend partnered with Asia Muhammad in doubles at both tournaments. With this success, she won the USTA wildcard entry into the French Open, where Townsend made her major singles debut ranked No. 205. She defeated fellow American No. 65, Vania King, and upset the top-ranked French woman, world No. 21 Alizé Cornet, to advance to the third round, in which she lost to No. 15, Carla Suárez Navarro. Sloane Stephens was the only other American woman to make it that far in the tournament.

Townsend also received wildcards to make her main-draw debuts at the last two major events of the year, Wimbledon and the US Open, but lost in the first round at each tournament. The latter loss was to Serena Williams, who went on to win the title.

=== 2015: Top 100 debut, and decline ===
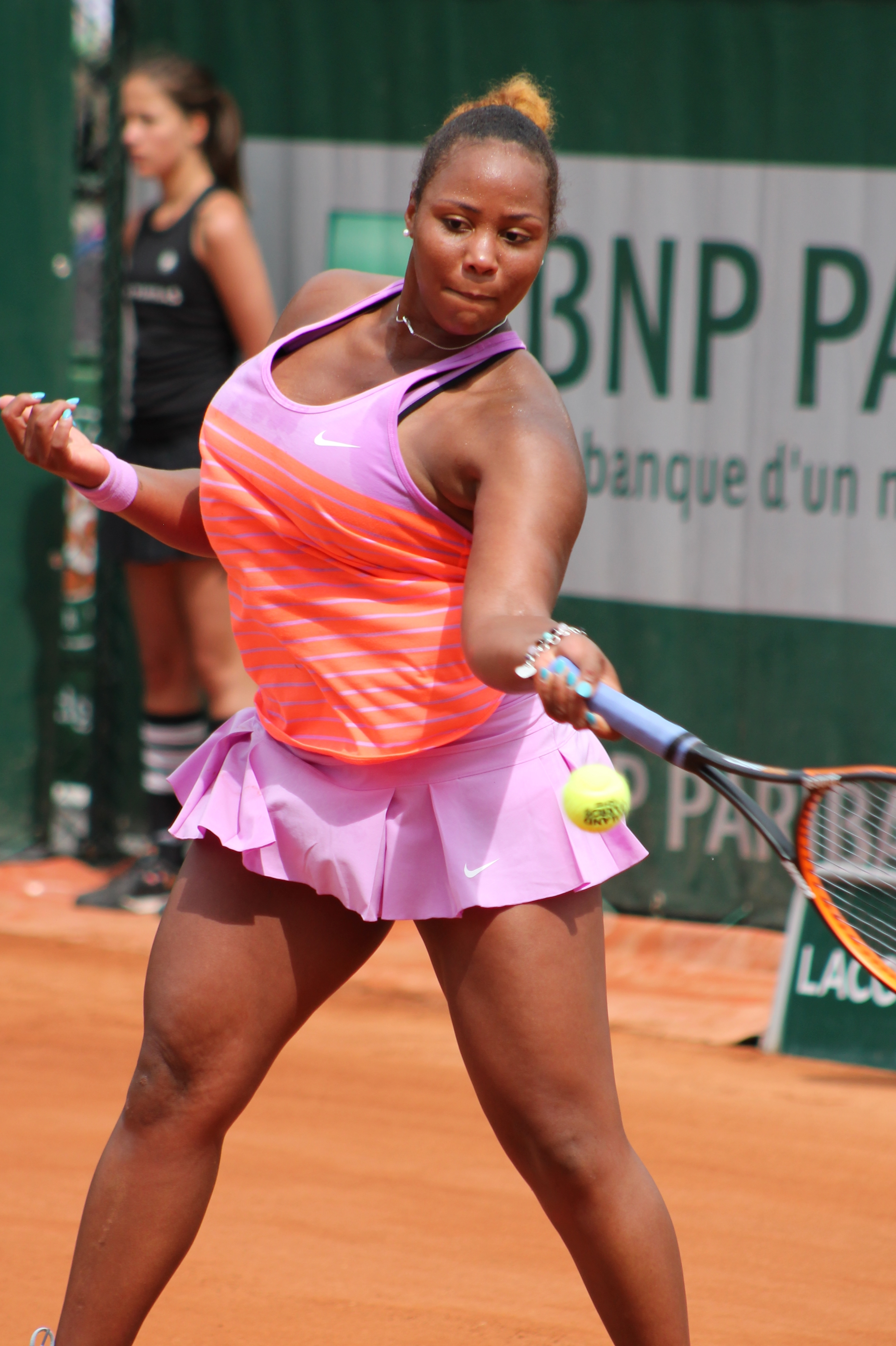
Townsend at the 2015 French Open

Townsend broke into the top 100 at the very start of the season, after reaching the second round at the Auckland Open. With a higher ranking, she gained direct entry into the Australian Open and lost to Caroline Wozniacki in the first round. In February, she made her Fed Cup debut against Argentina and won her only match, a dead rubber where she was partnered with CoCo Vandeweghe. Townsend then fell out of the top 100 in April and began to struggle with her form, winning just two matches on the ITF Circuit the rest of the year and none at the WTA Tour level. She finished the year ranked outside of the top 300.

=== 2016: Doubles dominance on the ITF Circuit ===
With a lower ranking, Townsend returned to playing ITF events almost exclusively. Her decision to switch back to her childhood coach, Donald Young sr. after the 2015 French Open eventually began to pay off as she regained her form in the spring. In April, she repeated her feat from 2014 of winning both the singles and doubles titles at the Clay Court Classic in Charlottesville. This again helped her win the French Open Wild Card Challenge. After partnering with Asia Muhammad just once in 2015, the previously successful doubles team recombined to win five ITF Circuit doubles titles by the end of April, including back-to-back-to-back clay court titles at Pelham, Dothan, and Charlottesville. Townsend returned to the top 200 by May and got back to No. 154, after winning her first-round match at the French Open. From there, her ranking steadily rose to as high as No. 131 in the world near the end of the year. She also finished the season with eight ITF Circuit doubles titles to reach a year-end doubles ranking of No. 73.

=== 2017: Return to top 100 ===
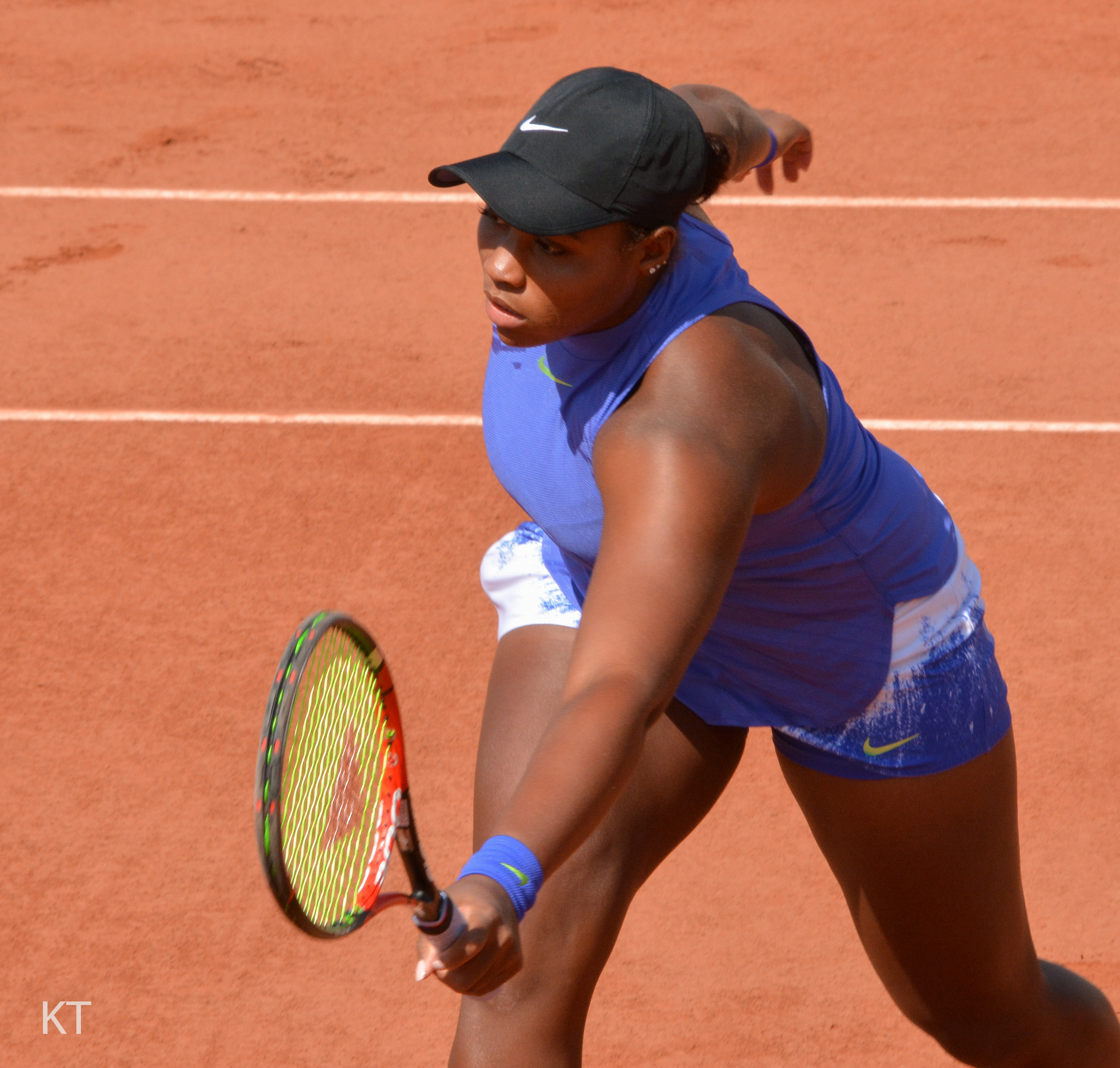
Townsend at the 2017 French Open

Up until the very end of the year, Townsend maintained her ranking just outside of the top 100. She reached the third round of the Miami Open as a qualifier, her best result at a Premier tier tournament to date. In the spring, Townsend had a quieter clay-court season compared to the previous year, but still won a match at the French Open yet again. She produced another solid performance at a premier tournament in August, making it to the second round at the 2017 Cincinnati Open, after needing to qualify for the main draw. Towards the end of the season, she won both the singles and doubles events at back-to-back tournaments for the second time in her career, this time at the $25k level. In her final tournament of the year, Townsend played in the Waco Showdown and dominated the early rounds, losing a total of just two games in her first three matches. Townsend ended up winning this $80k event for the biggest title of her career. With this result, she also returned to the top 100.

=== 2018: Career-high singles ranking in top 75 ===
In the spring, Townsend delivered an exemplary performance during the American ITF clay-court season. She reached the semifinals at two out of the four events (Indian Harbour Beach and Charlottesville) and won the title at the other two tournaments (Dothan and Charleston), both of which were $80k events. She also easily won the French Open Wild Card Challenge for the third time in her career. At the end of this stretch of events, Townsend reached a career-high ranking of No. 73 in the world.

She played for the Philadelphia Freedoms in the World TeamTennis league, where she was awarded the season's Female MVP. The team lost in the WTT Finals.

=== 2019–20: US Open fourth round in singles ===
At the 2019 US Open, Townsend achieved her first victory against a top-10 player, upsetting world No. 4, Simona Halep, in a third-set tiebreaker in the second round. She went one step further, defeating another Romanian, Sorana Cîrstea, to reach the fourth round for the first time in her career at a major event and as a qualifier.

At the 2020 US Open, she reached the semifinals in doubles for the first time in her career at a major, partnering with Asia Muhammad.

=== 2022: US Open final, French Open semifinal ===
At the French Open, Townsend reached the semifinals for the first time in her career at this major, with Madison Keys as a protected ranking pair on their debut. She also used her protected ranking to participate in the main draw in singles, after coming back from maternity leave.

At the US Open, she ended runners-up in the doubles final with Caty McNally.

=== 2023: French Open final, WTA 1000 title, world No. 5 ===
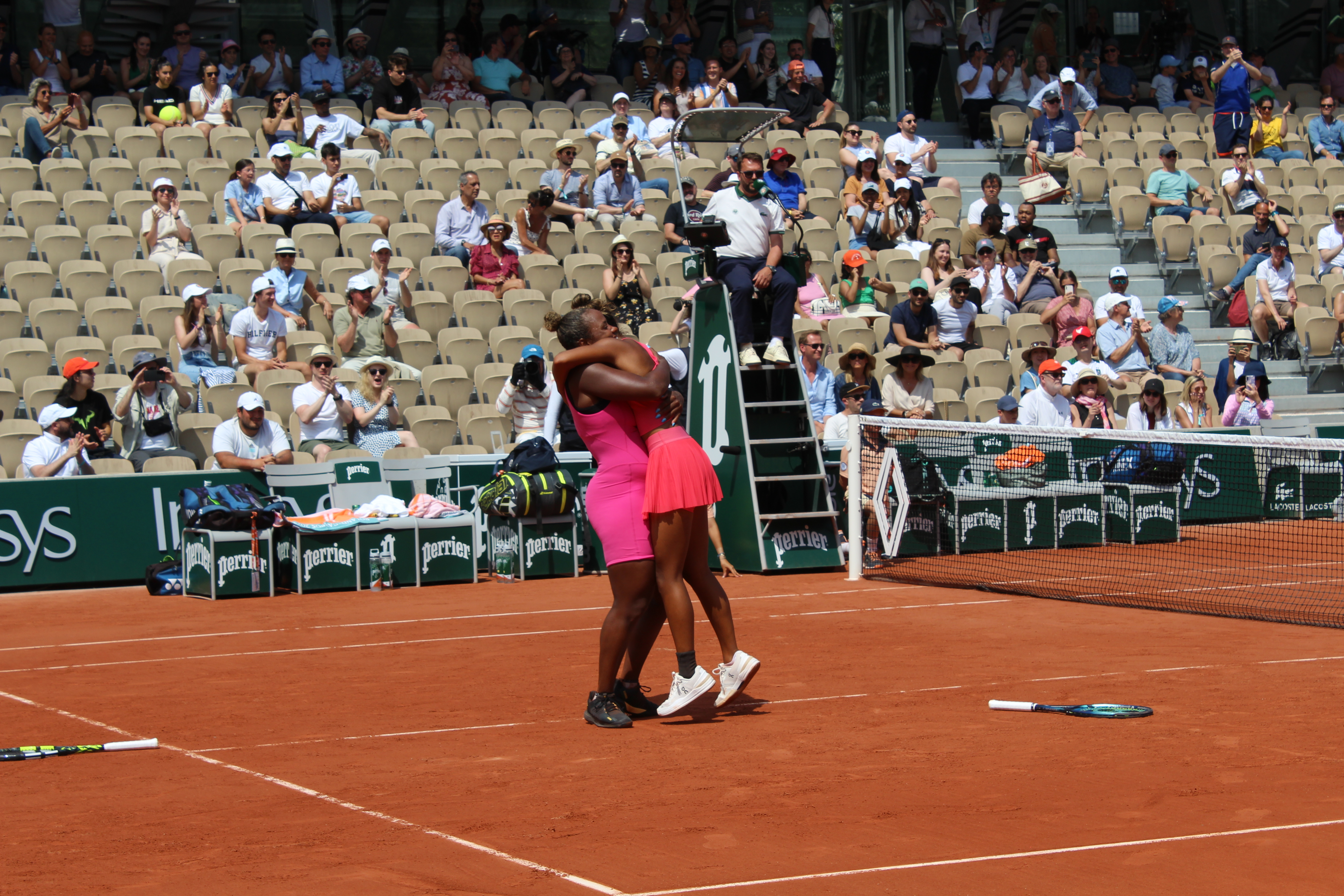
Townsend and doubles partner Leylah Fernandez embrace at the 2023 French Open.

In singles, she received a wildcard for the Australian Open where she won her first-round match against Ysaline Bonaventure. In doubles, Townsend started 2023 with her second and third titles on the WTA Tour by winning both editions of the Adelaide International, partnering Asia Muhammad at the Adelaide 1 and Luisa Stefani at the Adelaide 2. As a result, she reached a new career-high in doubles in the top 20, on 27 February 2023.

At the Miami Open, she was moved directly into the main draw from the qualifying draw, where she defeated Anna Bondár in the first round. In doubles, partnering with Leylah Fernandez, they reached the final where they lost to American No. 1 duo, Coco Gauff and Jessica Pegula. As a result, she moved to a new career high in the doubles rankings of No. 14, on 3 April 2023.

She entered the top 10 at world No. 6, after reaching the semifinals with Fernandez at the Madrid Open. At the Italian Open, she reached the third round in singles of a WTA 1000 only for the second time in her career, defeating again Ysaline Bonaventure and third seed Jessica Pegula for her first top-5 win of the season and only second in her career. Next, she reached the final of the WTA 125 at Firenze where she lost to Jasmine Paolini.

Later in May, Townsend won three matches in the qualifying to enter in the main draw of the French Open but lost to 24th seed Anastasia Potapova. At the same tournament, she reached her second major final with Leylah Fernandez. As a result, she moved to a new career-high ranking of world No. 5 in doubles on 12 June 2023.

In doubles in Cincinnati, Townsend paired with Alycia Parks for the first time. They won the title, defeating Nicole Melichar-Martinez and Ellen Perez in the final.

=== 2024: Wimbledon doubles title, singles Canadian quarterfinal ===
At the Adelaide International, she won the doubles title with partner Beatriz Haddad Maia, defeating Caroline Garcia and Kristina Mladenovic in the final.

During the Sunshine Double, she qualified for the Indian Wells Open and the Miami Open, and defeated Magda Linette and 25th seed Elise Mertens in the first round, respectively.

She reached her third major doubles final at the Wimbledon Championships with Kateřina Siniaková. They won the title defeating the new world No. 1 pair of Erin Routliffe and Gabriela Dabrowski, in straight sets with two tiebreaks. As a result, she returned to the top 10 in the doubles rankings on 15 July 2024.

In the beginning of the American summer hardcourt swing, she won her seventh doubles title partnering Asia Muhammad at the Washington Open.

Ranked No. 71 at the Canadian Open, she entered as a lucky loser and reached the quarterfinals for the first time at the WTA 1000 level and for the first time at a WTA Tour event in her career as well, upsetting 16th seed Dayana Yastremska by retirement, local wildcard Marina Stakusic and fourth seed Jeļena Ostapenko, the third biggest win in her career. Among players with three matches won to reach the quarterfinals at the tournament, only Caroline Wozniacki in 2014 (6) dropped fewer games than Townsend in 2024 (9) en route, in the Open Era. She was the first lucky loser to reach a WTA 1000 quarterfinal since the introduction of the format in 2009, getting into the main draw as an injury replacement. She also qualified for the main draw of the Cincinnati Open and defeated Caroline Dolehide and ninth seed Daria Kasatkina. As a result, she reached a new career-high singles ranking of No. 46 on 19 August 2024.

Partnering Donald Young, she reached the mixed doubles final at the US Open, losing in straight sets to Sara Errani and Andrea Vavassori.

Alongside Kateřina Siniaková, Townsend qualified for the WTA Finals and reached the semifinals after going unbeaten in the group stages. They defeated Chan Hao-ching and Veronika Kudermetova in the last four. Townsend and Siniaková lost to second seeds Gabriela Dabrowski and Erin Routliffe in the final.

=== 2025: Australian Open title and doubles No. 1 ===
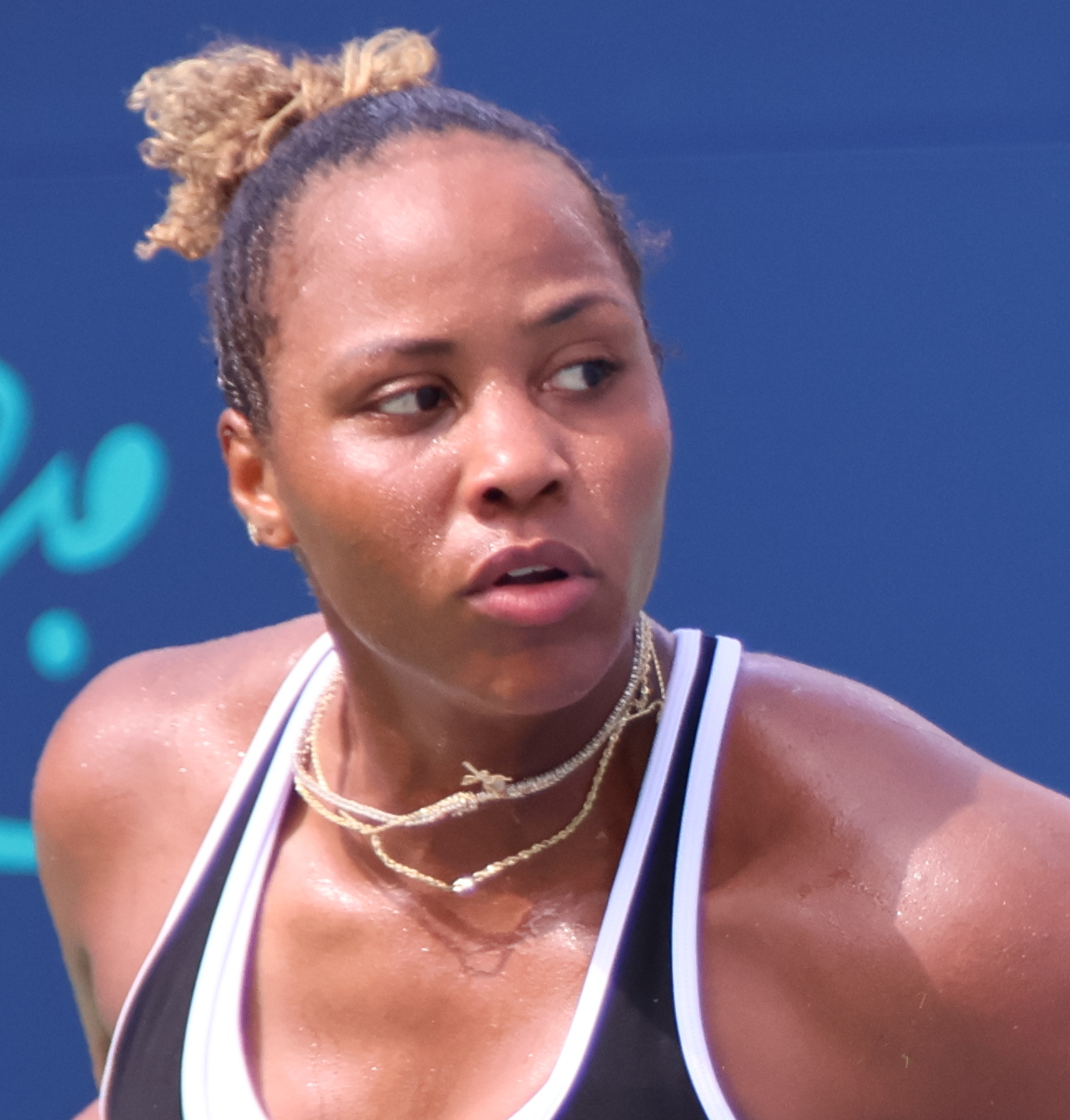
Townsend at the 2025 Washington DC Open

Partnering Siniaková, Townsend claimed her second major doubles title by winning the Australian Open, defeating Hsieh Su-wei and Jeļena Ostapenko in the final.

At the Dubai Championships, partnering Siniaková, who was the defending champion, the pair defeated again Ostapenko and Hsieh to win their third title as a team and first at a WTA 1000. As a result, Townsend reached a new career-high ranking of world No. 2 on 24 February 2025.

At the French Open, Townsend and Evan King reached the mixed doubles finals, losing to Sara Errani and Andrea Vavassori in straight sets.

Following reaching the final at the Washington Open with Zhang Shuai, Taylor Townsend became the 50th world No. 1 in doubles on 28 July 2025. By achieving this milestone, she made history by becoming the first mother on tour to reach the world No. 1 ranking in any discipline. At the same tournament in singles, she reached the quarterfinals where she lost to eventual champion, Leylah Fernandez.

At the US Open, after winning a second-round match against Jeļena Ostapenko, Townsend and Ostapenko got into a heated argument. Townsend had not apologized for a net cord during play and Ostapenko felt "disrespected", saying Townsend had "no class" and "no education". Townsend went on to win her next match, against fifth seed Mirra Andreeva, and reached the fourth round, equaling her previous best performance at a major (when she reached the same stage at the 2019 US Open). She had eight match points in her fourth-round match against Barbora Krejčíková before losing in three sets.

During the BJK Cup finals in Shenzhen, China, Townsend posted multiple Instagram stories sharing her distaste for Chinese cuisine at the gala dinner buffet, saying "these people are literally killing frogs". Later, Townsend issued an apology, saying "I understand that I am so privileged, as a professional athlete, to be able to travel all around the world and experience cultural differences".

=== 2026: WTA Tour singles final, Sunshine Double & Madrid 1000 titles ===
At the ATX Open, Townsend entered the main-draw as a wildcard and reached her first WTA Tour singles final, losing to fourth seed Peyton Stearns in straight sets. Alongside Storm Hunter, she won the doubles at the same tournament, defeating Eudice Chong and Liang En-shuo in the final.

Reunited with regular partner, Kateřina Siniaková, she won back-to-back WTA 1000 doubles titles at the Indian Wells Open and Miami Open, becoming the sixth pairing to complete the so-called Sunshine Double. At the Madrid Open, Townsend and Siniaková defeated Mirra Andreeva and Diana Shnaider in straight sets in the final to win their third WTA 1000 doubles title in a row. They also won the French Open, overcoming Anna Danilina and Aleksandra Krunić in the final.

In September at the US Open, Townsend completed the Career Grand Slam with Siniaková, defeating wildcard entrants Ashlyn Krueger and Robin Montgomery in the final. Townsend and Siniaková became just the seventh team in the Open Era to complete the Career Grand Slam together. Townsend's speech after the event, where she acknowledged the increase in black representation at the tournament and expressed the importance of representation, sparked discussions about race in tennis.

In November, Townsend and Siniaková won the title at the end of season WTA Finals, defeating Sara Errani and Jasmine Paolini in the final.

== World TeamTennis ==
Townsend has played six seasons with World TeamTennis, making her debut in 2013 with the Sacramento Capitals. She has since played for the Philadelphia Freedoms from 2014 to 2019, even earning the 2018 WTT Female MVP honor by having the top winning percentage in women's singles and women's doubles for the season. It was announced she will be joining the Philadelphia Freedoms during the 2020 WTT season set to begin July 12.

Townsend paired up with Fabrice Martin in mixed doubles and Caroline Dolehide and Sofia Kenin in women's doubles throughout the 2020 season. The Freedoms earned a No. 1 seed headed into WTT Playoffs, but ultimately fell to the New York Empire, who would continue on to win the Championship, in the semifinal.

== 2012 US Open controversy ==
Townsend was asked by the USTA to sit out of the 2012 US Open junior tournament because of her weight and also denied her request for a wild card for the US Open main draw or the qualifying tournament, which she had received the year before. Patrick McEnroe stated, "Our concern is her long-term health, number one, and her long-term development as a player. We have one goal in mind: For her to be playing in Arthur Ashe Stadium in the main draw and competing for major titles when it's time." Townsend was shocked by the USTA's decision given that she was the top-ranked junior girl in the world.

The decision was sharply criticized by players like Serena Williams, Lindsay Davenport and Martina Navratilova. Sports Illustrated wrote, "Instead of helping a promising young talent gain that confidence and experience gleaned from competing, the USTA has taken a paternalistic tack, deeming itself the arbiter and architect behind Townsend's past, present and future success. It's the arrogance of institution built on the belief that there is a tried-and-true formula to build a champion."

The USTA at first refused to pay for Townsend's expenses, so she paid to enter the junior singles tournament, where she was the top seed as a result of her ranking. She won her first three matches in straight sets but was defeated in the quarterfinals by Anett Kontaveit, also in straight sets. Later, the USTA agreed to pay for Townsend's expenses as Patrick McEnroe spoke of a miscommunication. Still, the USTA decision cost Townsend an opportunity to compete for a wildcard to enter the main draw of the US Open.

Following the controversy, Townsend split from her USTA coaches and began training with former world No. 4, Olympic doubles gold medalist, and 1990 Wimbledon finalist Zina Garrison, who continued to coach her until 2015.

== Career statistics ==
=== Grand Slam tournament performance timelines ===
Key
W	F	SF	QF	#R	RR	Q#	P#	DNQ	A	Z#	PO	G	S	B	NMS	NTI	P	NH

(W) winner; (F) finalist; (SF) semifinalist; (QF) quarterfinalist; (#R) rounds 4, 3, 2, 1; (RR) round-robin stage; (Q#) qualification round; (P#) preliminary round; (DNQ) did not qualify; (A) absent; (Z#) Davis/Fed Cup Zonal Group (with number indication) or (PO) play-off; (G) gold, (S) silver or (B) bronze Olympic/Paralympic medal; (NMS) not a Masters tournament; (NTI) not a Tier I tournament; (P) postponed; (NH) not held; (SR) strike rate (events won / competed); (W–L) win–loss record.
To avoid confusion and double counting, these charts are updated at the conclusion of a tournament or when the player's participation has ended.

Only main-draw results in Grand Slam tournaments are included in win–loss records.

==== Singles ====
Current through the 2026 US Open.

Tournament	2011	2012	2013	2014	2015	2016	2017	2018	2019	2020	2021	2022	2023	2024	2025	2026	SR	W–L	Win %
Australian Open	A	A	A	A	1R	A	Q3	1R	1R	2R	A	A	2R	1R	1R	1R	0 / 8	2–8	20%
French Open	A	A	A	3R	1R	2R	2R	2R	1R	A	A	1R	1R	A	1R	1R	0 / 10	5–10	33%
Wimbledon	A	A	A	1R	A	Q2	Q1	2R	2R	NH	A	A	Q3	1R	1R	1R	0 / 6	2–6	25%
US Open	Q2	A	Q3	1R	Q2	1R	1R	2R	4R	1R	A	1R	3R	2R	4R	4R	0 / 11	13–11	54%
Win–loss	0–0	0–0	0–0	2–3	0–2	1–2	1–2	3–4	4–4	1–2	0–0	0–2	3–3	1–3	3–4	3–4	0 / 35	22–35	39%

==== Doubles ====
Current through the 2026 US Open.

Tournament	2011	2012	2013	2014	2015	2016	2017	2018	2019	2020	2021	2022	2023	2024	2025	2026	SR	W–L	Win %
Australian Open	A	A	A	A	A	A	1R	1R	3R	2R	A	A	2R	3R	W	QF	1 / 8	14–7	67%
French Open	A	A	A	A	A	A	1R	2R	1R	A	A	SF	F	A	QF	W	1 / 7	19–6	76%
Wimbledon	A	A	A	A	A	Q2	1R	A	1R	NH	A	A	2R	W	SF	QF	1 / 6	14–5	74%
US Open	3R	A	1R	1R	2R	QF	1R	1R	2R	SF	A	F	QF	SF	F	W	1/ 14	32–13	71%
Win–loss	2–1	0–0	0–1	0–1	1–1	3–1	0–4	1–3	3–4	4–2	0–0	9–2	10–4	11–2	18–3	17–2	4 / 35	79–31	72%

=== Grand Slam tournament finals ===
==== Doubles: 7 (4 titles, 3 runner-ups) ====
Result	Year	Tournament	Surface	Partner	Opponents	Score
Loss	2022	US Open	Hard	(United States) Caty McNally	(Czech Republic) Barbora Krejčíková (Czech Republic) Kateřina Siniaková	6–3, 5–7, 1–6
Loss	2023	French Open	Clay	(Canada) Leylah Fernandez	(Chinese Taipei) Hsieh Su-wei (China) Wang Xinyu	6–1, 6–7^{(5–7)}, 1–6
Win	2024	Wimbledon	Grass	(Czech Republic) Kateřina Siniaková	(Canada) Gabriela Dabrowski (New Zealand) Erin Routliffe	7–6^{(7–5)}, 7–6^{(7–1)}
Win	2025	Australian Open	Hard	(Czech Republic) Kateřina Siniaková	(Chinese Taipei) Hsieh Su-wei (Latvia) Jeļena Ostapenko	6–2, 6–7^{(4–7)}, 6–3
Loss	2025	US Open	Hard	(Czech Republic) Kateřina Siniaková	(Canada) Gabriela Dabrowski (New Zealand) Erin Routliffe	4–6, 4–6
Win	2026	French Open	Clay	(Czech Republic) Kateřina Siniaková	(Kazakhstan) Anna Danilina (Serbia) Aleksandra Krunić	6–2, 7–5
Win	2026	US Open	Hard	(Czech Republic) Kateřina Siniaková	(United States) Ashlyn Krueger (United States) Robin Montgomery	5–7, 6–0, 6–2

==== Mixed doubles: 2 (2 runner-ups) ====
Result	Year	Tournament	Surface	Partner	Opponents	Score
Loss	2024	US Open	Hard	(United States) Donald Young	(Italy) Sara Errani (Italy) Andrea Vavassori	6–7^{(0–7)}, 5–7
Loss	2025	French Open	Clay	(United States) Evan King	(Italy) Sara Errani (Italy) Andrea Vavassori	4–6, 2–6

=== Year-end championships ===
==== Doubles: 2 (1 title, 1 runner-up) ====
Result	Year	Tournament	Surface	Partner	Opponents	Score
Loss	2024	WTA Finals, Saudi Arabia	Hard (i)	(Czech Republic) Kateřina Siniaková	(Canada) Gabriela Dabrowski (New Zealand) Erin Routliffe	5–7, 3–6
Win	2026	WTA Finals, US	Hard	(Czech Republic) Kateřina Siniaková	(Italy) Sara Errani (Italy) Jasmine Paolini	6–4, 6–3

Awards
Preceded by (Russia) Irina Khromacheva	ITF Junior World Champion; 2012	Succeeded by (Switzerland) Belinda Bencic
