= 2012 US Open – Girls' singles =

Girls' singles
- 2012 US Open

Final
- Champion: (United States) Samantha Crawford
- Runner-up: (Estonia) Anett Kontaveit
- Score: 7–5, 6–3

Events
| Singles | men | women | | boys | girls |
| Doubles | men | women | mixed | boys | girls |
| WC Singles | men | women | quad |
| WC Doubles | men | women | quad |
| Legends | men | women | mixed |
- US Open

Grace Min was the defending champion, having won the event in 2011, but did not compete.

Wildcard Samantha Crawford defeated twelfth seed Anett Kontaveit in the final 7–5, 6–3, to win her first junior grand slam title.

== Seeds ==
1. (United States) Taylor Townsend (quarterfinals)
2. (Kazakhstan) Yulia Putintseva (quarterfinals; withdrew)
3. (Canada) Eugenie Bouchard (second round)
4. (Germany) Antonia Lottner (semifinals)
5. (Russia) Elizaveta Kulichkova (first round)
6. (Czech Republic) Kateřina Siniaková (third round)
7. (Slovakia) Petra Uberalová (first round)
8. (United States) Sachia Vickery (third round)
9. (Kazakhstan) Anna Danilina (quarterfinals)
10. (United States) Chalena Scholl (second round)
11. (Switzerland) Belinda Bencic (second round)
12. (Estonia) Anett Kontaveit (final)
13. (Croatia) Ana Konjuh (third round)
14. (Canada) Carol Zhao (third round)
15. (United States) Krista Hardebeck (first round)
16. (Mexico) Marcela Zacarías (third round)

== Qualifiers ==
1. (United States) Nicole Frenkel
2. (Mexico) Victoria Rodríguez
3. (United States) Tornado Alicia Black
4. (United States) Rasheeda McAdoo
5. (United States) Louisa Chirico
6. (South Africa) Madrie Le Roux
7. (Hungary) Szabina Szlavikovics
8. (Canada) Marika Akkerman

== Main draw ==
Key

- Q = Qualifier
- WC = Wild card
- LL = Lucky loser
- Alt = Alternate
- ITF = ITF entry
- PR = Protected ranking
- SR = Special ranking
- SE = Special exempt
- JE = Junior exempt
- JR = Junior Accelerator Programme entrant
- CO = College Accelerator Programme entrant
- NG = Next Gen Accelerator Program entrant
- w/o = Walkover
- r = Retired
- d = Defaulted

=== Final rounds ===
Quarterfinals
1 | (United States) Taylor Townsend | 4 | 4
12 | (Estonia) Anett Kontaveit | 6 | 6
WC | (United States) Victoria Duval | 6 | 3 | 6
9 | (Kazakhstan) Anna Danilina | 3 | 6 | 2
(Romania) Ilka Csöregi | 3 | 1
4 | (Germany) Antonia Lottner | 6 | 6
WC | (United States) Samantha Crawford | w/o
2 | (Kazakhstan) Yulia Putintseva

Semifinals
12 | (Estonia) Anett Kontaveit | 6 | 7^{7}
WC | (United States) Victoria Duval | 2 | 6^{4}
4 | (Germany) Antonia Lottner | 6 | 1 | 2
WC | (United States) Samantha Crawford | 3 | 6 | 6

Final
12 | (Estonia) Anett Kontaveit | 5 | 3
WC | (United States) Samantha Crawford | 7 | 6

=== Top half ===
==== Section 1 ====
First round
1 | (United States) Taylor Townsend | 6 | 6
(Colombia) Laura Ucrós | 3 | 3
(Brazil) Beatriz Haddad Maia | 0 | 3
(Belgium) Elise Mertens | 6 | 6
WC | (United States) Jamie Loeb | 6 | 6^{1} | 6
(Egypt) Mayar Sherif | 2 | 7^{7} | 0
(United States) Christina Makarova | 3 | 0
16 | (Mexico) Marcela Zacarías | 6 | 6
12 | (Estonia) Anett Kontaveit | 6 | 6
Q | (South Africa) Madrie Le Roux | 4 | 3
(United States) Alexandra Kiick | 7 | 6
(Russia) Veronika Kudermetova | 5 | 1
(Canada) Françoise Abanda | 6 | 6
WC | (United States) Brooke Austin | 1 | 2
(Austria) Barbara Haas | 5 | 6 | 6^{2}
6 | (Czech Republic) Kateřina Siniaková | 7 | 2 | 7^{7}

Second round
1 | (United States) T Townsend | 7^{7} | 7
(Belgium) E Mertens | 6^{4} | 5
WC | (United States) J Loeb | 2 | 2
16 | (Mexico) M Zacarías | 6 | 6
12 | (Estonia) A Kontaveit | 6 | 6^{4} | 7^{7}
(United States) A Kiick | 0 | 7^{7} | 6^{4}
(Canada) F Abanda | 6 | 4 | 1
6 | (Czech Republic) K Siniaková | 0 | 6 | 6

Third round
1 | (United States) T Townsend | 6 | 7^{7}
16 | (Mexico) M Zacarías | 0 | 6^{6}
12 | (Estonia) A Kontaveit | 6 | 6
6 | (Czech Republic) K Siniaková | 4 | 4

Quarterfinals
1 | (United States) T Townsend | 4 | 4
12 | (Estonia) A Kontaveit | 6 | 6

==== Section 2 ====
First round
3 | (Canada) Eugenie Bouchard | 6 | 6
(Sweden) Rebecca Peterson | 1 | 1
WC | (United States) Victoria Duval | 7 | 6
(Russia) Varvara Flink | 5 | 0
(Israel) Valeria Patiuk | 4 | 6 | 6
(Croatia) Bernarda Pera | 6 | 3 | 1
(Liechtenstein) Kathinka von Deichmann | 6 | 6
15 | (United States) Krista Hardebeck | 1 | 2
9 | (Kazakhstan) Anna Danilina | 6 | 6
Q | (United States) Louisa Chirico | 4 | 4
WC | (United States) Anne-Liz Jeukeng | 6 | 2 | 6
(Italy) Camilla Rosatello | 4 | 6 | 2
(Latvia) Jeļena Ostapenko | 3 | 3
(Ukraine) Viktoriya Lushkova | 6 | 6
WC | (United States) Caroline Doyle | 6 | 6
7 | (Slovakia) Petra Uberalová | 1 | 4

Second round
3 | (Canada) E Bouchard | 6 | 1 | 4
WC | (United States) V Duval | 2 | 6 | 6
(Israel) V Patiuk | 2 | 1
(Liechtenstein) K von Deichmann | 6 | 6
9 | (Kazakhstan) A Danilina | 6 | 6
WC | (United States) A-L Jeukeng | 0 | 0
(Ukraine) V Lushkova | 1 | 3
WC | (United States) C Doyle | 6 | 6

Third round
WC | (United States) V Duval | 6 | 6
(Liechtenstein) K von Deichmann | 2 | 2
9 | (Kazakhstan) A Danilina | 5 | 6 | 6
WC | (United States) C Doyle | 7 | 3 | 1

Quarterfinals
WC | (United States) V Duval | 6 | 3 | 6
9 | (Kazakhstan) A Danilina | 3 | 6 | 2

=== Bottom half ===
==== Section 3 ====
First round
5 | (Russia) Elizaveta Kulichkova | 6 | 3 | 3
(Sweden) Ellen Allgurin | 4 | 6 | 6
Q | (United States) Nicole Frenkel | 4 | 6 | 3
(Romania) Ilka Csöregi | 6 | 4 | 6
Q | (Mexico) Victoria Rodríguez | 6 | 2 | 3
(Turkey) İpek Soylu | 3 | 6 | 6
(Czech Republic) Dominika Paterová | 1 | 2
10 | (United States) Chalena Scholl | 6 | 6
13 | (Croatia) Ana Konjuh | 6 | 6
(New Zealand) Emily Fanning | 1 | 1
Q | (United States) Tornado Alicia Black | 6 | 6
(Ukraine) Oleksandra Korashvili | 3 | 4
(United States) Kyle McPhillips | 6 | 6
Q | (Canada) Marika Akkerman | 2 | 2
(United States) Jennifer Brady | 3 | 3
4 | (Germany) Antonia Lottner | 6 | 6

Second round
(Sweden) E Allgurin | 4 | 3
(Romania) I Csöregi | 6 | 6
(Turkey) İ Soylu | 7 | 7
10 | (United States) C Scholl | 5 | 5
13 | (Croatia) A Konjuh | 4 | 6 | 6
Q | (United States) TA Black | 6 | 2 | 1
(United States) K McPhillips | 4 | 1
4 | (Germany) A Lottner | 6 | 6

Third round
(Romania) I Csöregi | 6 | 6
(Turkey) İ Soylu | 2 | 2
13 | (Croatia) A Konjuh | 4 | 7^{7} | 0
4 | (Germany) A Lottner | 6 | 6^{4} | 6

Quarterfinals
(Romania) I Csöregi | 3 | 1
4 | (Germany) A Lottner | 6 | 6

==== Section 4 ====
First round
8 | (United States) Sachia Vickery | 6 | 6
(Brazil) Laura Pigossi | 3 | 3
(Ecuador) Doménica González | 6 | 5 | 3
(Croatia) Adrijana Lekaj | 1 | 7 | 6
WC | (United States) Samantha Crawford | 6 | 6
(Poland) Zuzanna Maciejewska | 3 | 3
(Canada) Erin Routliffe | 1 | 0
11 | (Switzerland) Belinda Bencic | 6 | 6
14 | (Canada) Carol Zhao | 6 | 6
WC | (United States) Kimberly Yee | 2 | 2
Q | (United States) Rasheeda McAdoo | 4 | 4
(Chinese Taipei) Hsu Ching-wen | 6 | 6
(Belgium) Elke Lemmens | 1 | 6 | 6
Q | (Hungary) Szabina Szlavikovics | 6 | 2 | 4
WC | (United States) Gabrielle Andrews | 3 | 0
2 | (Kazakhstan) Yulia Putintseva | 6 | 6

Second round
8 | (United States) S Vickery | 6 | 6
(Croatia) A Lekaj | 3 | 4
WC | (United States) S Crawford | 7^{7} | 3 | 7
11 | (Switzerland) B Bencic | 6^{5} | 6 | 5
14 | (Canada) C Zhao | 6 | 2
(Chinese Taipei) C-w Hsu | 2 | 1^{r}
(Belgium) E Lemmens | 1 | 0
2 | (Kazakhstan) Y Putintseva | 6 | 6

Third round
8 | (United States) S Vickery | 6 | 1 | 3
WC | (United States) S Crawford | 0 | 6 | 6
14 | (Canada) C Zhao | 6^{8} | 6^{3}
2 | (Kazakhstan) Y Putintseva | 7^{10} | 7^{7}

Quarterfinals
WC | (United States) S Crawford | w/o
2 | (Kazakhstan) Y Putintseva
