= Gabrielle Andrews =

American tennis player (born 1996)

- Full name: Gabrielle Andrews
- Country (sports): United States
- Born: December 23, 1996 (age 29) West Covina, California, U.S.
- Height: 5 ft 9 in (175 cm)
- College: UCLA Bruins
- Prize money: $2,341

Singles
- Career record: 1–3
- Career titles: 0 WTA, 0 ITF
- Highest ranking: No. 938 (October 22, 2012)

Grand Slam singles results
- Australian Open Junior: 1R (2012)
- US Open Junior: 2R (2011)

Doubles
- Career record: 2-4
- Career titles: 0 WTA, 0 ITF
- Highest ranking: NR
- Current ranking: NR

Grand Slam doubles results
- Australian Open Junior: W (2012)
- US Open Junior: W (2012)
- Last updated on: October 22, 2012.

Gabrielle Faith "Gabby" Andrews (born December 23, 1996) is an American professional tennis player. On October 22, 2012, she reached her highest WTA singles ranking of 938. Andrews is best known for reaching the final at the 2011 US Open girls' doubles event and for winning the same event at the 2012 Australian Open alongside fellow American Taylor Townsend.

On May 25, 2019, playing for the UCLA Bruins, she and teammate Ayan Broomfield won the doubles event at the 2019 NCAA Division I Women's Tennis Championship, defeating Kate Fahey and Brienne Minor of the Michigan Wolverines.

== Career statistics ==
=== Junior Grand Slam finals ===
==== Doubles: 2 finals (1 title, 1 runner-up) ====
Outcome	Year	Championship	Surface	Partner	Opponents in the final	Score in the final
Winner	2011	US Open	Hard	(United States) Taylor Townsend	(Switzerland) Belinda Bencic (Slovakia) Petra Uberalová	6–4, 6–3
Winner	2012	Australian Open	Hard	(United States) Taylor Townsend	(Russia) Irina Khromacheva (Netherlands) Demi Schuurs	5–7, 7–5, [10–6]
