= 2012 US Open – Boys' singles =

Boys' singles
- 2012 US Open

Final
- Champion: (Canada) Filip Peliwo
- Runner-up: (United Kingdom) Liam Broady
- Score: 6–2, 2–6, 7–5

Events
Singles	men	women		boys	girls
Doubles	men	women	mixed	boys	girls
WC Singles	men	women	quad
WC Doubles	men	women	quad
Legends	men	women	mixed
- US Open

Oliver Golding was the defending champion, but was no longer eligible to compete.

Filip Peliwo won the 2012 title defeating Liam Broady in the final 6–2, 2–6, 7–5, claiming his second consecutive and overall junior grand slam title, having previously won the Wimbledon Boys' title.

== Seeds ==
1. (Belgium) Kimmer Coppejans (quarterfinals)
2. (Canada) Filip Peliwo (champion)
3. (Italy) Gianluigi Quinzi (quarterfinals)
4. (Brazil) Thiago Monteiro (second round)
5. (United States) Mitchell Krueger (first round)
6. (Serbia) Nikola Milojević (first round)
7. (Australia) Nick Kyrgios (quarterfinals)
8. (Japan) Kaichi Uchida (semifinals)
9. (Portugal) Frederico Ferreira Silva (third round)
10. (Italy) Stefano Napolitano (first round, retired)
11. (Germany) Daniel Masur (second round)
12. (United Kingdom) Joshua Ward-Hibbert (second round)
13. (United Kingdom) Liam Broady (final)
14. (United States) Noah Rubin (first round)
15. (United States) Mackenzie McDonald (first round)
16. (Belgium) Julien Cagnina (third round)

== Qualifiers ==
1. (France) Maxime Hamou
2. (Spain) José António Salazar Martín
3. (United States) Michael Mmoh
4. (Israel) Or Ram-Harel
5. (Portugal) Vasco Mensurado
6. (India) Sumit Nagal
7. (Japan) Shotaro Goto
8. (Russia) Karen Khachanov

== Main draw ==
Key

- Q = Qualifier
- WC = Wild card
- LL = Lucky loser
- Alt = Alternate
- ITF = ITF entry
- PR = Protected ranking
- SR = Special ranking
- SE = Special exempt
- JE = Junior exempt
- JR = Junior Accelerator Programme entrant
- CO = College Accelerator Programme entrant
- NG = Next Gen Accelerator Program entrant
- w/o = Walkover
- r = Retired
- d = Defaulted

=== Final rounds ===
Quarterfinals
1	(Belgium) Kimmer Coppejans	1	4
8	(Japan) Kaichi Uchida	6	6
13	(United Kingdom) Liam Broady	7^{8}	7^{7}
(South Africa) Wayne Montgomery	6^{6}	6^{4}
(Japan) Yoshihito Nishioka	6^{5}	6	6
3	(Italy) Gianluigi Quinzi	7^{7}	3	0
7	(Australia) Nick Kyrgios	6	3	4
2	(Canada) Filip Peliwo	2	6	6

Semifinals
8	(Japan) Kaichi Uchida	1	1
13	(United Kingdom) Liam Broady	6	6
(Japan) Yoshihito Nishioka	4	0
2	(Canada) Filip Peliwo	6	6

Final
13	(United Kingdom) Liam Broady	2	6	5
2	(Canada) Filip Peliwo	6	2	7

=== Top half ===
==== Section 1 ====
First round
1	(Belgium) Kimmer Coppejans	7	6
(Italy) Matteo Donati	5	2
Q	(Russia) Karen Khachanov	7^{7}	7^{8}
(Czech Republic) Václav Šafránek	6^{2}	6^{6}
(Croatia) Franko Miočić	2	2
(France) Quentin Halys	6	6
(South Korea) Chung Hyeon	6	3	6
15	(United States) Mackenzie McDonald	3	6	0
11	(Germany) Daniel Masur	6	4	7
(Egypt) Karim Hossam	3	6	5
(United Kingdom) Luke Bambridge	4	3
(United States) Harrison Adams	6	6
(United States) Alexios Halebian	6^{7}	3
(Chile) Christian Garin	7^{9}	6
Q	(India) Sumit Nagal	6	1	1
8	(Japan) Kaichi Uchida	4	6	6

Second round
1	(Belgium) K Coppejans	6	6
Q	(Russia) K Khachanov	1	2
(France) Q Halys	6^{7}	3
(South Korea) H Chung	7^{9}	6
11	(Germany) D Masur	3	4
(United States) H Adams	6	6
(Chile) C Garin	3	4
8	(Japan) K Uchida	6	6

Third round
1	(Belgium) K Coppejans	6	6
(South Korea) H Chung	2	3
(United States) H Adams	5	6^{5}
8	(Japan) K Uchida	7	7^{7}

Quarterfinals
1	(Belgium) K Coppejans	1	4
8	(Japan) K Uchida	6	6

==== Section 2 ====
First round
4	(Brazil) Thiago Monteiro	5	6	7
(Mexico) Lucas Gómez	7	2	5
Q	(France) Maxime Hamou	7^{7}	7^{7}
(United States) Thai-Son Kwiatkowski	6^{3}	6^{4}
(United States) Jared Donaldson	6	3	4
(Finland) Herkko Pöllänen	1	6	6
Q	(Spain) José António Salazar Martín	4	3
13	(United Kingdom) Liam Broady	6	6
10	(Italy) Stefano Napolitano	3	6	2^{r}
(United States) Stefan Kozlov	6	4	4
(Sweden) Elias Ymer	3	6	3
(Australia) Jordan Thompson	6	2	6
(South Africa) Wayne Montgomery	6	6
Q	(Portugal) Vasco Mensurado	2	2
Q	(Israel) Or Ram-Harel	6	5	6
5	(United States) Mitchell Krueger	4	7	3

Second round
4	(Brazil) T Monteiro	1	3
Q	(France) M Hamou	6	6
(Finland) H Pöllänen	1	5
13	(United Kingdom) L Broady	6	7
(United States) S Kozlov	6	6^{6}	6
(Australia) J Thompson	3	7^{8}	3
(South Africa) W Montgomery	6	6
Q	(Israel) O Ram-Harel	1	3

Third round
Q	(France) M Hamou	7^{7}	4	3
13	(United Kingdom) L Broady	6^{5}	6	6
(United States) S Kozlov	2	3
(South Africa) W Montgomery	6	6

Quarterfinals
13	(United Kingdom) L Broady	7^{8}	7^{7}
(South Africa) W Montgomery	6^{6}	6^{4}

=== Bottom half ===
==== Section 3 ====
First round
6	(Serbia) Nikola Milojević	2	1
(Germany) Maximilian Marterer	6	6
(France) Enzo Couacaud	6	6
(United States) Henrik Wiersholm	2	2
(United States) Ronnie Schneider	4	6	1
(Japan) Yoshihito Nishioka	6	1	6
(South Korea) Kang Ku-keon	4	2
12	(United Kingdom) Joshua Ward-Hibbert	6	6
16	(Belgium) Julien Cagnina	7	6
(Denmark) Mikael Torpegaard	5	4
Q	(United States) Michael Mmoh	6	6
(Brazil) Gabriel Friedrich	4	3
(Croatia) Borna Ćorić	6^{5}	6	6
(Uzbekistan) Temur Ismailov	7^{7}	0	1
(United States) Jared Hiltzik	2	5
3	(Italy) Gianluigi Quinzi	6	7

Second round
(Germany) M Marterer	7	6
(France) E Couacaud	5	3
(Japan) Y Nishioka	2	6	6
12	(United Kingdom) J Ward-Hibbert	6	1	2
16	(Belgium) J Cagnina	6	6
Q	(United States) M Mmoh	3	3
(Croatia) B Ćorić	1	7^{7}	3
3	(Italy) G Quinzi	6	6^{2}	6

Third round
(Germany) M Marterer	5	3
(Japan) Y Nishioka	7	6
16	(Belgium) J Cagnina	6	2	1
3	(Italy) G Quinzi	3	6	6

Quarterfinals
(Japan) Y Nishioka	6^{5}	6	6
3	(Italy) G Quinzi	7^{7}	3	0

==== Section 4 ====
First round
7	(Australia) Nick Kyrgios	6	6
(Russia) Anton Desyatnik	4	4
(United States) Michael Redlicki	6	6
(Argentina) Pedro Cachin	4	4
(Germany) Kevin Kaczynski	6	3
(Italy) Pietro Licciardi	0	0^{r}
(United States) Spencer Papa	5	3
9	(Portugal) Frederico Ferreira Silva	7	6
14	(United States) Noah Rubin	3	3
(United Kingdom) Kyle Edmund	6	6
(Belgium) Jeroen Vanneste	1	6^{6}
Q	(Japan) Shotaro Goto	6	7^{8}
(Sweden) Filip Bergevi	4	6^{6}
(Greece) Markos Kalovelonis	6	7^{8}
(United States) Deiton Baughman	3	3
2	(Canada) Filip Peliwo	6	6

Second round
7	(Australia) N Kyrgios	6	6
(United States) Mi Redlicki	1	3
(Germany) K Kaczynski	6	4	1
9	(Portugal) F Ferreira Silva	3	6	6
(United Kingdom) K Edmund	7^{7}	6
Q	(Japan) S Goto	6^{5}	2
(Greece) M Kalovelonis	6	4	1
2	(Canada) F Peliwo	4	6	6

Third round
7	(Australia) N Kyrgios	6^{2}	6	6
9	(Portugal) F Ferreira Silva	7^{7}	1	2
(United Kingdom) K Edmund	3	3
2	(Canada) F Peliwo	6	6

Quarterfinals
7	(Australia) N Kyrgios	6	3	4
2	(Canada) F Peliwo	2	6	6
