= 2012 US Open – Boys' doubles =

Boys' doubles
- 2012 US Open

Final
- Champion: (United Kingdom) Kyle Edmund (Portugal) Frederico Ferreira Silva
- Runner-up: (Australia) Nick Kyrgios (Australia) Jordan Thompson
- Score: 6–2, 2–6, 7–5

Events
Singles	men	women		boys	girls
Doubles	men	women	mixed	boys	girls
WC Singles	men	women	quad
WC Doubles	men	women	quad
Legends	men	women	mixed
- US Open

Robin Kern and Julian Lenz were the defending champions, having won the event in 2011.
Kyle Edmund and Frederico Ferreira Silva won the title, defeating Nick Kyrgios and Jordan Thompson 6–2, 2–6, 7–5 in the final.

Due to bad weather the matches of the first three round have been playing at the indoor courts.

== Seeds ==
1. (Canada) Filip Peliwo / (Japan) Kaichi Uchida (second round)
2. (United States) Mitchell Krueger / (United States) Mackenzie McDonald (quarterfinals)
3. (Serbia) Nikola Milojević / (South Africa) Wayne Montgomery (first round)
4. (Belgium) Kimmer Coppejans / (Belgium) Jeroen Vanneste (first round)
5. (Germany) Maximilian Marterer / (Germany) Daniel Masur (semifinals)
6. (Australia) Nick Kyrgios / (Australia) Jordan Thompson (final)
7. (Brazil) Gabriel Friedrich / (Brazil) Thiago Monteiro (second round)
8. (United Kingdom) Kyle Edmund / (Portugal) Frederico Ferreira Silva (champions)

== Draw ==
Key

- Q = Qualifier
- WC = Wild card
- LL = Lucky loser
- Alt = Alternate
- ITF = ITF entry
- PR = Protected ranking
- SR = Special ranking
- SE = Special exempt
- JE = Junior exempt
- JR = Junior Accelerator Programme entrant
- CO = College Accelerator Programme entrant
- NG = Next Gen Accelerator Program entrant
- w/o = Walkover
- r = Retired
- d = Defaulted

=== Final rounds ===
Semifinals
6	(Australia) Nick Kyrgios (Australia) Jordan Thompson	7^{7}	6
5	(Germany) Maximilian Marterer (Germany) Daniel Masur	6^{3}	3
(Japan) Yoshihito Nishioka (Peru) Jorge Brian Panta	2	4
8	(United Kingdom) Kyle Edmund (Portugal) Frederico Ferreira Silva	6	6

Final
6	(Australia) Nick Kyrgios (Australia) Jordan Thompson	7	4	[6]
8	(United Kingdom) Kyle Edmund (Portugal) Frederico Ferreira Silva	5	6	[10]

=== Top half ===
First round
1	(Canada) Filip Peliwo (Japan) Kaichi Uchida	4	6	[10]
(United States) Stefan Kozlov (United States) Spencer Papa	6	4	[6]
(United Kingdom) Luke Bambridge (United Kingdom) Liam Broady	6	6
(Germany) Kevin Kaczynski (Israel) Or Ram-Harel	2	4
(South Korea) Chung Hyeon (South Korea) Kang Ku-keon	6	6
(United States) Deiton Baughman (United States) Henrik Wiersholm	4	1
(France) Enzo Couacaud (France) Quentin Halys	4	4
6	(Australia) Nick Kyrgios (Australia) Jordan Thompson	6	6
4	(Belgium) Kimmer Coppejans (Belgium) Jeroen Vanneste	6	3	[5]
(Mexico) Lucas Gómez (United States) Thai-Son Kwiatkowski	3	6	[10]
(United States) Michael Mmoh (United States) Frances Tiafoe	2	3
(Croatia) Borna Ćorić (Sweden) Elias Ymer	6	6
(Italy) Matteo Donati (Italy) Stefano Napolitano	6	6
(Canada) Hugo Di Feo (France) Maxime Hamou	3	0
(United States) Luca Corinteli (United States) Martin Redlicki	3	3
5	(Germany) Maximilian Marterer (Germany) Daniel Masur	6	6

Second round
1	(Canada) F Peliwo (Japan) K Uchida	3	2
(United Kingdom) L Bambridge (United Kingdom) L Broady	6	6
(South Korea) H Chung (South Korea) K Kang	6^{3}	4
6	(Australia) N Kyrgios (Australia) J Thompson	7^{7}	6
(Mexico) L Gómez (United States) T-S Kwiatkowski	6	6
(Croatia) B Ćorić (Sweden) E Ymer	4	4
(Italy) M Donati (Italy) S Napolitano	4	6	[6]
5	(Germany) M Marterer (Germany) D Masur	6	3	[10]

Quarterfinals
(United Kingdom) L Bambridge (United Kingdom) L Broady	4	6^{3}
6	(Australia) N Kyrgios (Australia) J Thompson	6	7^{7}
(Mexico) L Gómez (United States) T-S Kwiatkowski	5	1
5	(Germany) M Marterer (Germany) D Masur	7	6

Semifinals
6	(Australia) N Kyrgios (Australia) J Thompson	7^{7}	6
5	(Germany) M Marterer (Germany) D Masur	6^{3}	3

=== Bottom half ===
First round
7	(Brazil) Gabriel Friedrich (Brazil) Thiago Monteiro	7^{7}	6
(Sweden) Filip Bergevi (Denmark) Mikael Torpegaard	6^{5}	1
(United Kingdom) Evan Hoyt (United Kingdom) Joshua Ward-Hibbert	6	6
(United States) Harrison Adams (United States) Ronnie Schneider	4	3
(United States) Alexios Halebian (United States) Noah Rubin	6	7
(Croatia) Franko Miočić (Czech Republic) Václav Šafránek	1	5
(Japan) Yoshihito Nishioka (Peru) Jorge Brian Panta	3	6	[11]
3	(Serbia) Nikola Milojević (South Africa) Wayne Montgomery	6	0	[9]
8	(United Kingdom) Kyle Edmund (Portugal) Frederico Ferreira Silva	7	6
(Chile) Christian Garin (Italy) Gianluigi Quinzi	5	2
(Belgium) Julien Cagnina (Portugal) Vasco Mensurado	6	6
(Argentina) Pedro Cachin (Spain) José António Salazar Martín	4	0
(Japan) Shotaro Goto (India) Sumit Nagal	4	3
(Russia) Anton Desyatnik (Russia) Karen Khachanov	6	6
(Uzbekistan) Temur Ismailov (Greece) Markos Kalovelonis	4	1
2	(United States) Mitchell Krueger (United States) Mackenzie McDonald	6	6

Second round
7	(Brazil) G Friedrich (Brazil) T Monteiro	6^{4}	3
(United Kingdom) E Hoyt (United Kingdom) J Ward-Hibbert	7^{7}	6
(United States) A Halebian (United States) N Rubin	4	7^{12}	[8]
(Japan) Y Nishioka (Peru) JB Panta	6	6^{10}	[10]
8	(United Kingdom) K Edmund (Portugal) F Ferreira Silva	6	4	[10]
(Belgium) J Cagnina (Portugal) V Mensurado	3	6	[7]
(Russia) A Desyatnik (Russia) K Khachanov	2	6	[7]
2	(United States) M Krueger (United States) M McDonald	6	3	[10]

Quarterfinals
(United Kingdom) E Hoyt (United Kingdom) J Ward-Hibbert	6	3	[10]
(Japan) Y Nishioka (Peru) JB Panta	2	6	[12]
8	(United Kingdom) K Edmund (Portugal) F Ferreira Silva	7	6
2	(United States) M Krueger (United States) M McDonald	5	4

Semifinals
(Japan) Y Nishioka (Peru) JB Panta	2	4
8	(United Kingdom) K Edmund (Portugal) F Ferreira Silva	6	6
