= 2012 US Open – Girls' doubles =

Girls' doubles
- 2012 US Open

Final
- Champions: (United States) Gabrielle Andrews (United States) Taylor Townsend
- Runners-up: (Switzerland) Belinda Bencic (Slovakia) Petra Uberalová
- Score: 6–4, 6–3

Events
Singles	men	women		boys	girls
Doubles	men	women	mixed	boys	girls
WC Singles	men	women	quad
WC Doubles	men	women	quad
Legends	men	women	mixed
- US Open

Irina Khromacheva and Demi Schuurs were the defending champions, having won the event in 2011.

Gabrielle Andrews and Taylor Townsend won the tournament, defeating Belinda Bencic and Petra Uberalová in the final, 6–4, 6–3.

== Seeds ==
1. (Kazakhstan) Anna Danilina / (Russia) Elizaveta Kulichkova (semifinals)
2. (Switzerland) Belinda Bencic / (Slovakia) Petra Uberalová (final)
3. (Canada) Françoise Abanda / (United States) Sachia Vickery (quarterfinals)
4. (United States) Gabrielle Andrews / (United States) Taylor Townsend (champions)
5. (Belgium) Elise Mertens / (Czech Republic) Kateřina Siniaková (second round)
6. (Brazil) Beatriz Haddad Maia / (Brazil) Laura Pigossi (second round)
7. (Croatia) Ana Konjuh / (Croatia) Adrijana Lekaj (second round)
8. (Germany) Antonia Lottner / (Liechtenstein) Kathinka von Deichmann (semifinals)

== Draw ==
Key

- Q = Qualifier
- WC = Wild card
- LL = Lucky loser
- Alt = Alternate
- ITF = ITF entry
- PR = Protected ranking
- SR = Special ranking
- SE = Special exempt
- JE = Junior exempt
- JR = Junior Accelerator Programme entrant
- CO = College Accelerator Programme entrant
- NG = Next Gen Accelerator Program entrant
- w/o = Walkover
- r = Retired
- d = Defaulted

=== Finals ===
Semifinals
1	(Kazakhstan) Anna Danilina (Russia) Elizaveta Kulichkova	2	6^{1}
4	(United States) Gabrielle Andrews (United States) Taylor Townsend	6	7^{7}
8	(Germany) Antonia Lottner (Liechtenstein) Kathinka von Deichmann	2	6	[7]
2	(Switzerland) Belinda Bencic (Slovakia) Petra Uberalová	6	1	[10]

Final
4	(United States) Gabrielle Andrews (United States) Taylor Townsend	6	6
2	(Switzerland) Belinda Bencic (Slovakia) Petra Uberalová	4	3

=== Top half ===
First round
1	(Kazakhstan) Anna Danilina (Russia) Elizaveta Kulichkova	7^{8}	1	[10]
(Belgium) Elke Lemmens (Belgium) Klaartje Liebens	6^{6}	6	[4]
(Russia) Veronika Kudermetova (United States) Christina Makarova	7^{7}	6
WC	(United States) Brooke Austin (United States) Jamie Loeb	6^{2}	2
(United States) Caroline Doyle (United States) Chalena Scholl	2	3
(Romania) Ilka Csöregi (Latvia) Jeļena Ostapenko	6	6
(Ukraine) Oleksandra Korashvili (Ukraine) Viktoriya Lushkova	7^{7}	6^{2}	[6]
6	(Brazil) Beatriz Haddad Maia (Brazil) Laura Pigossi	6^{1}	7^{7}	[10]
4	(United States) Gabrielle Andrews (United States) Taylor Townsend	6	6
(Sweden) Ellen Allgurin (Sweden) Rebecca Peterson	1	0
(New Zealand) Emily Fanning (Estonia) Anett Kontaveit	6	6
(Canada) Marika Akkerman (Mexico) Victoria Rodríguez	2	2
WC	(United States) Krista Hardebeck (United States) Anne-Liz Jeukeng	2	1
(Italy) Camilla Rosatello (Turkey) İpek Soylu	6	6
(Russia) Varvara Flink (Egypt) Mayar Sherif	3	3
7	(Croatia) Ana Konjuh (Croatia) Adrijana Lekaj	6	6

Second round
1	(Kazakhstan) A Danilina (Russia) E Kulichkova	1	7	[10]
(Russia) V Kudermetova (United States) C Makarova	6	5	[3]
(Romania) I Csöregi (Latvia) J Ostapenko	7^{7}	6
6	(Brazil) B Haddad Maia (Brazil) L Pigossi	6^{3}	4
4	(United States) G Andrews (United States) T Townsend	6	7^{7}
(New Zealand) E Fanning (Estonia) A Kontaveit	4	6^{4}
(Italy) C Rosatello (Turkey) İ Soylu	6	6
7	(Croatia) A Konjuh (Croatia) A Lekaj	3	3

Quarterfinals
1	(Kazakhstan) A Danilina (Russia) E Kulichkova	3	6	[11]
(Romania) I Csöregi (Latvia) J Ostapenko	6	0	[9]
4	(United States) G Andrews (United States) T Townsend	6	7^{7}
(Italy) C Rosatello (Turkey) İ Soylu	4	6^{4}

Semifinals
1	(Kazakhstan) A Danilina (Russia) E Kulichkova	2	6^{1}
4	(United States) G Andrews (United States) T Townsend	6	7^{7}

=== Bottom half ===
First round
8	(Germany) Antonia Lottner (Liechtenstein) Kathinka von Deichmann	6	6
(Czech Republic) Dominika Paterová (Colombia) Laura Ucrós	0	2
(Chinese Taipei) Hsu Ching-wen (Hungary) Szabina Szlavikovics	3	1
(United States) Samantha Crawford (United States) Alexandra Kiick	6	6
(Israel) Valeria Patiuk (Mexico) Marcela Zacarías	6	6
WC	(United States) Johnnise Renaud (United States) Kimberly Yee	4	1
(Ecuador) Doménica González (Croatia) Bernarda Pera	5	2
3	(Canada) Françoise Abanda (United States) Sachia Vickery	7	6
5	(Belgium) Elise Mertens (Czech Republic) Kateřina Siniaková	6	7
(South Africa) Madrie Le Roux (United States) Rasheeda McAdoo	0	5
(Canada) Erin Routliffe (Canada) Carol Zhao	6	6
(United States) Tornado Alicia Black (United States) Nicole Frenkel	0	1
(Austria) Barbara Haas (Poland) Zuzanna Maciejewska	6	6
(United States) Jennifer Brady (United States) Kyle McPhillips	4	2
WC	(United States) Louisa Chirico (United States) Denise Starr	2	4
2	(Switzerland) Belinda Bencic (Slovakia) Petra Uberalová	6	6

Second round
8	(Germany) A Lottner (Liechtenstein) K von Deichmann	6	6
(United States) S Crawford (United States) A Kiick	1	2
(Israel) V Patiuk (Mexico) M Zacarías	5	2
3	(Canada) F Abanda (United States) S Vickery	7	6
5	(Belgium) E Mertens (Czech Republic) K Siniaková	4	6	[9]
(Canada) E Routliffe (Canada) C Zhao	6	4	[11]
(Austria) B Haas (Poland) Z Maciejewska
2	(Switzerland) B Bencic (Slovakia) P Uberalová	w/o

Quarterfinals
8	(Germany) A Lottner (Liechtenstein) K von Deichmann	6	1	[11]
3	(Canada) F Abanda (United States) S Vickery	2	6	[9]
(Canada) E Routliffe (Canada) C Zhao	5	1
2	(Switzerland) B Bencic (Slovakia) P Uberalová	7	6

Semifinals
8	(Germany) A Lottner (Liechtenstein) K von Deichmann	2	6	[7]
2	(Switzerland) B Bencic (Slovakia) P Uberalová	6	1	[10]
