= 2012 US Open – Mixed doubles =

Mixed doubles
- 2012 US Open

Final
- Champion: (Russia) Ekaterina Makarova (Brazil) Bruno Soares
- Runner-up: (Czech Republic) Květa Peschke (Poland) Marcin Matkowski
- Score: 6–7^{(8–10)}, 6–1, [12–10]

Details
- Draw: 32
- Seeds: 8

Events
Singles	men	women		boys	girls
Doubles	men	women	mixed	boys	girls
WC Singles	men	women	quad
WC Doubles	men	women	quad
Legends	men	women	mixed
- US Open

Melanie Oudin and Jack Sock were the defending champions, but were defeated by Sania Mirza and Colin Fleming in the second round.

Ekaterina Makarova and Bruno Soares won the title, defeating Květa Peschke and Marcin Matkowski in the final 6–7^{(8–10)}, 6–1, [12–10].

Kim Clijsters played her final professional match before her retirement later this year in this tournament, partnering Bob Bryan. The pair were defeated by Makarova and Soares in the second round. Clijsters would return to professional tennis in 2020.

== Seeds ==
1. (United States) Liezel Huber / (Belarus) Max Mirnyi (semifinals)
2. (United States) Lisa Raymond / (United States) Mike Bryan (first round)
3. (Russia) Elena Vesnina / (India) Leander Paes (quarterfinals)
4. (Czech Republic) Květa Peschke / (Poland) Marcin Matkowski (final)
5. (Slovenia) Katarina Srebotnik / (Serbia) Nenad Zimonjić (first round)
6. (Czech Republic) Andrea Hlaváčková / (India) Mahesh Bhupathi (second round, withdrew)
7. (Czech Republic) Lucie Hradecká / (Czech Republic) František Čermák (semifinals)
8. (Poland) Klaudia Jans-Ignacik / (Poland) Mariusz Fyrstenberg (second round)

== Draw ==
Key

- Q = Qualifier
- WC = Wild card
- LL = Lucky loser
- Alt = Alternate
- ITF = ITF entry
- PR = Protected ranking
- SR = Special ranking
- SE = Special exempt
- JE = Junior exempt
- JR = Junior Accelerator Programme entrant
- CO = College Accelerator Programme entrant
- NG = Next Gen Accelerator Program entrant
- w/o = Walkover
- r = Retired
- d = Defaulted

=== Final rounds ===
Semifinals
1	(United States) Liezel Huber (Belarus) Max Mirnyi	5	2
4	(Czech Republic) Květa Peschke (Poland) Marcin Matkowski	7	6
7	(Czech Republic) Lucie Hradecká (Czech Republic) František Čermák	3	3
(Russia) Ekaterina Makarova (Brazil) Bruno Soares	6	6

Final
4	(Czech Republic) Květa Peschke (Poland) Marcin Matkowski	7^{10}	1	[10]
(Russia) Ekaterina Makarova (Brazil) Bruno Soares	6^{8}	6	[12]

=== Top half ===
First round
1	(United States) L Huber (Belarus) M Mirnyi	6	6
WC	(United States) G Min (United States) B Klahn	3	2
WC	(United States) S Stephens (United States) R Ram	6	5	[10]
(United States) B Mattek-Sands (Romania) H Tecău	2	7	[8]
WC	(United States) N Melichar (United States) B Battistone	6^{3}	3
(Spain) N Llagostera Vives (Spain) D Marrero	7^{7}	6
WC	(United States) S Crawford (United States) M Krueger	2	4
6	(Czech Republic) A Hlaváčková (India) M Bhupathi	6	6
4	(Czech Republic) K Peschke (Poland) M Matkowski	6	6
(Chinese Taipei) S-w Hsieh (Pakistan) A-u-H Qureshi	4	4
(Czech Republic) B Záhlavová-Strýcová (Slovakia) F Polášek	2	7	[6]
(Kazakhstan) G Voskoboeva (Italy) D Bracciali	6	5	[10]
(Germany) A Petkovic (United States) E Butorac	2	6^{5}
(India) S Mirza (United Kingdom) C Fleming	6	7^{7}
WC	(United States) M Oudin (United States) J Sock	4	6	[15]
5	(Slovenia) K Srebotnik (Serbia) N Zimonjić	6	3	[13]

Second round
1	(United States) L Huber (Belarus) M Mirnyi	w/o
WC	(United States) S Stephens (United States) R Ram
(Spain) N Llagostera Vives (Spain) D Marrero	w/o
6	(Czech Republic) A Hlaváčková (India) M Bhupathi
4	(Czech Republic) K Peschke (Poland) M Matkowski	6	7^{7}
(Kazakhstan) G Voskoboeva (Italy) D Bracciali	1	6^{2}
(India) S Mirza (United Kingdom) C Fleming	6	7^{9}
WC	(United States) M Oudin (United States) J Sock	4	6^{7}

Quarterfinals
1	(United States) L Huber (Belarus) M Mirnyi	6	7
(Spain) N Llagostera Vives (Spain) D Marrero	1	5
4	(Czech Republic) K Peschke (Poland) M Matkowski	6	7
(India) S Mirza (United Kingdom) C Fleming	3	5

Semifinals
1	(United States) L Huber (Belarus) M Mirnyi	5	2
4	(Czech Republic) K Peschke (Poland) M Matkowski	7	6

=== Bottom half ===
First round
7	(Czech Republic) L Hradecká (Czech Republic) F Čermák	3	6	[10]
(Germany) J Görges (Canada) D Nestor	6	3	[6]
WC	(United States) V Lepchenko (United States) D Young	6	6
(Czech Republic) V Uhlířová (United Kingdom) J Marray	1	3
(United States) A Spears (United States) S Lipsky	6	6
(Czech Republic) I Benešová (Austria) J Melzer	4	3
Alt	(United States) R Kops-Jones (Philippines) TC Huey	4	5
3	(Russia) E Vesnina (India) L Paes	6	7
8	(Poland) K Jans-Ignacik (Poland) M Fyrstenberg	6^{6}	6	[10]
(Slovakia) D Hantuchová (Sweden) R Lindstedt	7^{8}	3	[8]
(Australia) A Rodionova (Netherlands) J-J Rojer	6	7
(China) J Zheng (India) R Bopanna	2	5
WC	(United States) I Falconi (United States) S Johnson	2	2
(Belgium) K Clijsters (United States) B Bryan	6	6
(Russia) E Makarova (Brazil) B Soares	6	7
2	(United States) L Raymond (United States) M Bryan	1	5

Second round
7	(Czech Republic) L Hradecká (Czech Republic) F Čermák	2	6	[10]
WC	(United States) V Lepchenko (United States) D Young	6	4	[7]
(United States) A Spears (United States) S Lipsky	6	4	[5]
3	(Russia) E Vesnina (India) L Paes	4	6	[10]
8	(Poland) K Jans-Ignacik (Poland) M Fyrstenberg	6^{6}	4
(Australia) A Rodionova (Netherlands) J-J Rojer	7^{8}	6
(Belgium) K Clijsters (United States) B Bryan	2	6	[10]
(Russia) E Makarova (Brazil) B Soares	6	3	[12]

Quarterfinals
7	(Czech Republic) L Hradecká (Czech Republic) F Čermák	7^{7}	7
3	(Russia) E Vesnina (India) L Paes	6^{2}	5
(Australia) A Rodionova (Netherlands) J-J Rojer	6	3	[7]
(Russia) E Makarova (Brazil) B Soares	4	6	[10]

Semifinals
7	(Czech Republic) L Hradecká (Czech Republic) F Čermák	3	3
(Russia) E Makarova (Brazil) B Soares	6	6
