= 2012 US Open – Men's doubles =

Men's doubles
- 2012 US Open

Final
- Champion: (United States) Bob Bryan (United States) Mike Bryan
- Runner-up: (India) Leander Paes (Czech Republic) Radek Štěpánek
- Score: 6–3, 6–4

Details
- Draw: 64
- Seeds: 16

Events
Singles	men	women		boys	girls
Doubles	men	women	mixed	boys	girls
WC Singles	men	women	quad
WC Doubles	men	women	quad
Legends	men	women	mixed
← 2011 ·	US Open	· 2013 →

Jürgen Melzer and Philipp Petzschner were the defending champions, but lost in the second round to Jamie Delgado and Ken Skupski. Melzer and Petzschner needed a wildcard to compete because they forgot to sign up.

Bob Bryan and Mike Bryan defeated Leander Paes and Radek Štěpánek 6–3, 6–4 in the final to capture the title.

== Seeds ==
1. (Belarus) Max Mirnyi / (Canada) Daniel Nestor (first round)
2. (United States) Bob Bryan / (United States) Mike Bryan (champions)
3. (Sweden) Robert Lindstedt / (Romania) Horia Tecău (third round)
4. (Poland) Mariusz Fyrstenberg / (Poland) Marcin Matkowski (first round)
5. (India) Leander Paes / (Czech Republic) Radek Štěpánek (final)
6. (Spain) Marcel Granollers / (Spain) Marc López (semifinals, retired)
7. (France) Michaël Llodra / (Serbia) Nenad Zimonjić (first round)
8. (India) Mahesh Bhupathi / (India) Rohan Bopanna (first round)
9. (Pakistan) Aisam-ul-Haq Qureshi / (Netherlands) Jean-Julien Rojer (semifinals)
10. (Austria) Jürgen Melzer/ (Germany) Philipp Petzschner (second round)
11. (United Kingdom) Jonathan Marray / (Denmark) Frederik Nielsen (second round)
12. (Croatia) Ivan Dodig / (Brazil) Marcelo Melo (third round)
13. (Spain) David Marrero / (Spain) Fernando Verdasco (first round)
14. (United Kingdom) Colin Fleming / (United Kingdom) Ross Hutchins (third round)
15. (Austria) Alexander Peya / (Brazil) Bruno Soares (quarterfinals)
16. (Mexico) Santiago González / (United States) Scott Lipsky (third round)

== Draw ==
=== Key ===
- Q = Qualifier
- WC = Wild card
- LL = Lucky loser
- Alt = Alternate
- ITF = ITF entry
- PR = Protected ranking
- SR = Special ranking
- SE = Special exempt
- JE = Junior exempt
- JR = Junior Accelerator Programme entrant
- CO = College Accelerator Programme entrant
- NG = Next Gen Accelerator Program entrant
- w/o = Walkover
- r = Retired
- d = Defaulted

=== Final rounds ===
Quarterfinals
15	(Austria) Alexander Peya (Brazil) Bruno Soares	3	4
6	(Spain) Marcel Granollers (Spain) Marc López	6	6
(Austria) Julian Knowle (Slovakia) Filip Polášek	2	4
5	(India) Leander Paes (Czech Republic) Radek Štěpánek	6	6
9	(Pakistan) Aisam-ul-Haq Qureshi (Netherlands) Jean-Julien Rojer	6	6
WC	(United States) Christian Harrison (United States) Ryan Harrison	2	3
(France) Julien Benneteau (France) Nicolas Mahut	6^{2}	6^{4}
2	(United States) Bob Bryan (United States) Mike Bryan	7^{7}	7^{7}

Semifinals
6	(Spain) Marcel Granollers (Spain) Marc López	6^{r}
5	(India) Leander Paes (Czech Republic) Radek Štěpánek	6
9	(Pakistan) Aisam-ul-Haq Qureshi (Netherlands) Jean-Julien Rojer	3	4
2	(United States) Bob Bryan (United States) Mike Bryan	6	6

Final
5	(India) Leander Paes (Czech Republic) Radek Štěpánek	3	4
2	(United States) Bob Bryan (United States) Mike Bryan	6	6

=== Top half ===
==== Section 1 ====
First round
1	(Belarus) M Mirnyi (Canada) D Nestor	6	6^{4}	2
WC	(United States) S Johnson (United States) J Sock	1	7^{7}	6
(Belgium) D Norman (Germany) A Waske	3	6	6^{5}
(Czech Republic) F Čermák (Slovakia) M Mertiňák	6	3	7^{7}
(United States) J Blake (United States) S Querrey	1	6^{7}
(Philippines) TC Huey (United Kingdom) D Inglot	6	7^{9}
(United Kingdom) J Murray (Brazil) A Sá	2	2
15	(Austria) A Peya (Brazil) B Soares	6	6
10/WC	(Austria) J Melzer (Germany) P Petzschner	6	6
(Australia) A Fisher (Australia) J Kerr	3	4
(Sweden) J Brunström (United States) J Cerretani	6	4	3
(United Kingdom) J Delgado (United Kingdom) K Skupski	4	6	6
(Poland) Ł Kubot (Russia) M Youzhny	6	6
(Germany) B Becker (Finland) J Nieminen	1	4
(France) J Chardy (Slovakia) M Kližan	4	2
6	(Spain) M Granollers (Spain) M López	6	6

Second round
WC	(United States) S Johnson (United States) J Sock	4	5
(Czech Republic) F Čermák (Slovakia) M Mertiňák	6	7
(Philippines) TC Huey (United Kingdom) D Inglot	6	2	4
15	(Austria) A Peya (Brazil) B Soares	4	6	6
10/WC	(Austria) J Melzer (Germany) P Petzschner	6^{3}	6^{7}
(United Kingdom) J Delgado (United Kingdom) K Skupski	7^{7}	7^{9}
(Poland) Ł Kubot (Russia) M Youzhny	5	7^{9}	6^{4}
6	(Spain) M Granollers (Spain) M López	7	6^{7}	7^{7}

Third round
(Czech Republic) F Čermák (Slovakia) M Mertiňák	7^{7}	3	6^{3}
15	(Austria) A Peya (Brazil) B Soares	6^{5}	6	7^{7}
(United Kingdom) J Delgado (United Kingdom) K Skupski	2	4
6	(Spain) M Granollers (Spain) M López	6	6

Quarterfinals
15	(Austria) A Peya (Brazil) B Soares	3	4
6	(Spain) M Granollers (Spain) M López	6	6

==== Section 2 ====
First round
3	(Sweden) R Lindstedt (Romania) H Tecău	7^{7}	6
(Italy) D Bracciali (Argentina) H Zeballos	6^{4}	4
(Spain) R Ramírez Hidalgo (Spain) A Ramos	1	3
(France) B Paire (France) É Roger-Vasselin	6	6
(Ukraine) S Stakhovsky (Serbia) V Troicki	6	6
(Germany) M Kohlmann (Germany) B Phau	3	4
(Austria) J Knowle (Slovakia) F Polášek	6	6
13	(Spain) D Marrero (Spain) F Verdasco	3	4
11	(United Kingdom) J Marray (Denmark) F Nielsen	7	6
(Italy) F Cipolla (Italy) F Fognini	5	3
(United States) J Levine (Australia) M Matosevic	6	6
WC	(United States) C Buchanan (United States) B Klahn	2	4
Alt	(Brazil) T Bellucci (Brazil) J Souza	7^{7}	7^{7}
(Croatia) I Karlović (Germany) F Moser	6^{4}	6^{5}
(Germany) D Brown (Germany) C Kas	3	3
5	(India) L Paes (Czech Republic) R Štěpánek	6	6

Second round
3	(Sweden) R Lindstedt (Romania) H Tecău	6^{3}	6	6
(France) B Paire (France) É Roger-Vasselin	7^{7}	4	3
(Ukraine) S Stakhovsky (Serbia) V Troicki	4	0
(Austria) J Knowle (Slovakia) F Polášek	6	6
11	(United Kingdom) J Marray (Denmark) F Nielsen	1	7^{8}	4
(United States) J Levine (Australia) M Matosevic	6	6^{6}	6
Alt	(Brazil) T Bellucci (Brazil) J Souza	5	6^{3}
5	(India) L Paes (Czech Republic) R Štěpánek	7	7^{7}

Third round
3	(Sweden) R Lindstedt (Romania) H Tecău	1	6	4
(Austria) J Knowle (Slovakia) F Polášek	6	3	6
(United States) J Levine (Australia) M Matosevic	1	3
5	(India) L Paes (Czech Republic) R Štěpánek	6	6

Quarterfinals
(Austria) J Knowle (Slovakia) F Polášek	2	4
5	(India) L Paes (Czech Republic) R Štěpánek	6	6

=== Bottom half ===
==== Section 3 ====
First round
8	(India) M Bhupathi (India) R Bopanna	3	6^{4}
(Australia) M Ebden (Australia) B Tomic	6	7^{7}
(Russia) A Bogomolov Jr. (South Africa) R Klaasen	6	6
(Japan) T Ito (Japan) G Soeda	1	3
(Argentina) C Berlocq (Argentina) L Mayer	6	7^{7}
(Czech Republic) L Dlouhý (Ukraine) A Dolgopolov	3	6^{4}
(Kazakhstan) M Kukushkin (Chinese Taipei) Y-h Lu
9	(Pakistan) A-u-H Qureshi (Netherlands) J-J Rojer	w/o
14	(United Kingdom) C Fleming (United Kingdom) R Hutchins	7^{7}	6
(Slovenia) B Kavčič (Estonia) J Zopp	6^{3}	1
(Germany) M Emmrich (Netherlands) I Sijsling	6	1	6^{3}
(United States) B Baker (United States) R Ram	2	6	7^{7}
(Russia) M Elgin (Uzbekistan) D Istomin	6^{3}	2
(Israel) J Erlich (Israel) A Ram	7^{7}	6
WC	(United States) C Harrison (United States) R Harrison	7^{7}	2	7^{9}
4	(Poland) M Fyrstenberg (Poland) M Matkowski	6^{3}	6	6^{7}

Second round
(Australia) M Ebden (Australia) B Tomic	6	3	3
(Russia) A Bogomolov Jr. (South Africa) R Klaasen	3	6	6
(Argentina) C Berlocq (Argentina) L Mayer	1^{r}
9	(Pakistan) A-u-H Qureshi (Netherlands) J-J Rojer	2
14	(United Kingdom) C Fleming (United Kingdom) R Hutchins	7	6
(United States) B Baker (United States) R Ram	5	3
(Israel) J Erlich (Israel) A Ram	4	4
WC	(United States) C Harrison (United States) R Harrison	6	6

Third round
(Russia) A Bogomolov Jr. (South Africa) R Klaasen	3	4
9	(Pakistan) A-u-H Qureshi (Netherlands) J-J Rojer	6	6
14	(United Kingdom) C Fleming (United Kingdom) R Hutchins	3	4
WC	(United States) C Harrison (United States) R Harrison	6	6

Quarterfinals
9	(Pakistan) A-u-H Qureshi (Netherlands) J-J Rojer	6	6
WC	(United States) C Harrison (United States) R Harrison	2	3

==== Section 4 ====
First round
7	(France) M Llodra (Serbia) N Zimonjić	7	3	4
WC	(United States) N Monroe (United States) D Young	5	6	6
(France) J Benneteau (France) N Mahut	6	6
(Thailand) Sa Ratiwatana (Thailand) So Ratiwatana	3	3
WC	(United States) B Reynolds (United States) M Russell	4	6	6^{7}
WC	(United States) D Novikov (United States) M Redlicki	6	2	7^{9}
(Colombia) JS Cabal (Colombia) R Farah	3	4
12	(Croatia) I Dodig (Brazil) M Melo	6	6
16	(Mexico) S González (United States) S Lipsky	6	6
(Netherlands) R Haase (Italy) A Seppi	2	3
(Spain) P Andújar (Spain) G García-López	1	6	6
(The Bahamas) M Knowles (Belgium) X Malisse	6	4	3
(United States) E Butorac (Australia) P Hanley	7	6
(Czech Republic) J Hájek (Slovakia) L Lacko	5	3
(Belgium) S Darcis (Belgium) D Goffin	1	4
2	(United States) B Bryan (United States) M Bryan	6	6

Second round
WC	(United States) N Monroe (United States) D Young	4	4
(France) J Benneteau (France) N Mahut	6	6
WC	(United States) D Novikov (United States) M Redlicki	1	5
12	(Croatia) I Dodig (Brazil) M Melo	6	7
16	(Mexico) S González (United States) S Lipsky	6	6
(Spain) P Andújar (Spain) G García-López	4	1
(United States) E Butorac (Australia) P Hanley	3	2
2	(United States) B Bryan (United States) M Bryan	6	6

Third round
(France) J Benneteau (France) N Mahut	7^{7}	6
12	(Croatia) I Dodig (Brazil) M Melo	6^{2}	3
16	(Mexico) S González (United States) S Lipsky	7^{8}	6^{5}	3
2	(United States) B Bryan (United States) M Bryan	6^{6}	7^{7}	6

Quarterfinals
(France) J Benneteau (France) N Mahut	6^{2}	6^{4}
2	(United States) B Bryan (United States) M Bryan	7^{7}	7^{7}
