= 2018 Kentucky Bank Tennis Championships – Men's doubles =

Men's doubles
- 2018 Kentucky Bank Tennis Championships

Final
- Champions: (United States) Robert Galloway (Venezuela) Roberto Maytín
- Runners-up: (Belgium) Joris De Loore (Australia) Marc Polmans
- Score: 6–3, 6–1

Events
Singles	men	women
Doubles	men	women
← 2017 ·	Kentucky Bank Tennis Championships	· 2019 →

Alex Bolt and Max Purcell were the defending champions but only Purcell chose to defend his title, partnering Lloyd Harris. Purcell lost in the semifinals to Joris De Loore and Marc Polmans.

Robert Galloway and Roberto Maytín won the title after defeating De Loore and Polmans 6–3, 6–1 in the final.

== Seeds ==
1. (South Africa) Ruan Roelofse / (Australia) Luke Saville (first round)
2. (Australia) Matt Reid / (Japan) Yasutaka Uchiyama (semifinals)
3. (United States) Robert Galloway / (Venezuela) Roberto Maytín (champions)
4. (United Kingdom) Liam Broady / (United States) Hunter Reese (quarterfinals)

== Draw ==
=== Key ===
- Q = Qualifier
- WC = Wild card
- LL = Lucky loser
- Alt = Alternate
- ITF = ITF entry
- PR = Protected ranking
- SR = Special ranking
- SE = Special exempt
- JE = Junior exempt
- JR = Junior Accelerator Programme entrant
- CO = College Accelerator Programme entrant
- NG = Next Gen Accelerator Program entrant
- w/o = Walkover
- r = Retired
- d = Defaulted

First round
1	(South Africa) R Roelofse (Australia) L Saville	6^{5}	6	[6]
(India) S Myneni (India) VS Prashanth	7^{7}	2	[10]
(United States) H Johnson (United States) Y Johnson	4	6	[6]
(South Africa) L Harris (Australia) M Purcell	6	3	[10]
4	(United Kingdom) L Broady (United States) H Reese	6	6
(Brazil) J Menezes (Brazil) T Turini	3	3
(Belgium) J De Loore (Australia) M Polmans	6	6
(Italy) A Bega (Italy) S Napolitano	3	3
(Australia) A Harris (Japan) K Uchida	5	7	[10]
WC	(United States) N Chappell (France) Enzo Wallart	7	5	[6]
(United States) A Lawson (Brazil) K Sell	2	7^{12}	[9]
3	(United States) R Galloway (Venezuela) R Maytín	6	6^{10}	[11]
WC	(United States) JP Fruttero (United States) R Schneider	6	7^{8}
(France) H Grenier (France) Tom Jomby	3	6^{6}
WC	(United States) Trent Aaron (United States) Alan Chang	0	1
2	(Australia) M Reid (Japan) Y Uchiyama	6	6

Quarterfinals
(India) S Myneni (India) VS Prashanth	6	5	[5]
(South Africa) L Harris (Australia) M Purcell	2	7	[10]
4	(United Kingdom) L Broady (United States) H Reese	1	3
(Belgium) J De Loore (Australia) M Polmans	6	6
(Australia) A Harris (Japan) K Uchida	1	7	[11]
3	(United States) R Galloway (Venezuela) R Maytín	6	5	[13]
WC	(United States) JP Fruttero (United States) R Schneider	7	6^{2}	[6]
2	(Australia) M Reid (Japan) Y Uchiyama	5	7^{7}	[10]

Semifinals
(South Africa) L Harris (Australia) M Purcell	3	4
(Belgium) J De Loore (Australia) M Polmans	6	6
3	(United States) R Galloway (Venezuela) R Maytín	6	3	[10]
2	(Australia) M Reid (Japan) Y Uchiyama	3	6	[4]

Final
(Belgium) J De Loore (Australia) M Polmans	3	1
3	(United States) R Galloway (Venezuela) R Maytín	6	6
