= 2017 Kentucky Bank Tennis Championships =

- Date: 31 July – 6 August
- Edition: 22nd (men); 20th (women)
- Category: ATP Challenger Tour; ITF Women's Circuit
- Surface: Hard
- Location: Lexington, Kentucky, United States

Champions

Men's singles
- (United States) Michael Mmoh

Women's singles
- (United States) Grace Min

Men's doubles
- (Australia) Alex Bolt / (Australia) Max Purcell

Women's doubles
- (Australia) Priscilla Hon / (Belarus) Vera Lapko
- Lexington Challenger

The 2017 Kentucky Bank Tennis Championships was a professional tennis tournament played on outdoor hard courts. It was the 22nd edition, for men, and 20th edition, for women, of the tournament and part of the 2017 ATP Challenger Tour and the 2017 ITF Women's Circuit. It took place in Lexington, Kentucky, United States, on 31 July – 6 August 2017.

== Men's singles main draw entrants ==
=== Seeds ===
Country	Player	Rank^{1}	Seed
KAZ	Alexander Bublik	122	1
USA	Denis Kudla	172	2
AUS	John Millman	174	3
USA	Michael Mmoh	175	4
IRL	James McGee	206	5
AUS	John-Patrick Smith	209	6
AUS	Andrew Whittington	228	7
SLO	Blaž Rola	244	8

- ^{1} Rankings as of 24 July 2017.

=== Other entrants ===
The following players received a wildcard into the singles main draw:

- (United States) William Bushamuka
- (United States) Eric Quigley
- (United States) Martin Redlicki
- (United States) Michael Redlicki

The following players received entry into the singles main draw using a protected ranking:

- (France) Tom Jomby
- (United States) Kevin King

The following player received entry into the singles main draw as a special exempt:

- (United Kingdom) Cameron Norrie

The following players received entry from the qualifying draw:

- (United States) JC Aragone
- (United States) Ryan Haviland
- (Indonesia) Christopher Rungkat
- (United States) Jesse Witten

The following players received entry as lucky losers:

- (Australia) Mark Verryth
- (United States) Trey Yates

== Women's singles main draw entrants ==
=== Seeds ===
Country	Player	Rank^{1}	Seed
~~USA~~	~~Danielle Collins~~	~~160~~	~~1~~
USA	Sofia Kenin	165	2
GBR	Laura Robson	180	3
JPN	Eri Hozumi	191	4
FRA	Chloé Paquet	208	5
USA	Irina Falconi	214	6
USA	Grace Min	215	7
RUS	Ksenia Lykina	222	8

- ^{1} Rankings as of 24 July 2017.

=== Other entrants ===
The following players received a wildcard into the singles main draw:

- (United States) Emina Bektas
- (United States) Allie Kiick
- (United States) Taysia Rogers
- (United States) Anna Tatishvili

The following players received entry from the qualifying draw:

- (United States) Anastasia Nefedova
- (Colombia) Camila Osorio
- (New Zealand) Erin Routliffe
- (Latvia) Daniela Vismane

The following player received entry as a Lucky Loser:

- (United States) Chanelle Van Nguyen

== Champions ==
=== Men's singles ===
- (United States) Michael Mmoh def. (Australia) John Millman 4–6, 7–6^{(7–3)}, 6–3.

=== Women's singles ===
- (United States) Grace Min def. (United States) Sofia Kenin, 6–4, 6–1

=== Men's doubles ===
- (Australia) Alex Bolt / (Australia) Max Purcell def. (France) Tom Jomby / (United States) Eric Quigley 7–5, 6–4.

=== Women's doubles ===
- (Australia) Priscilla Hon / (Belarus) Vera Lapko def. (Japan) Hiroko Kuwata / (Russia) Valeria Savinykh, 6–3, 6–4
