= 2017 Kentucky Bank Tennis Championships – Men's singles =

Men's singles
- 2017 Kentucky Bank Tennis Championships

Final
- Champion: (United States) Michael Mmoh
- Runner-up: (Australia) John Millman
- Score: 4–6, 7–6^{(7–3)}, 6–3

Events
Singles	men	women
Doubles	men	women
← 2016 ·	Kentucky Bank Tennis Championships	· 2018 →

Ernesto Escobedo was the defending champion but chose not to defend his title.

Michael Mmoh won the title after defeating John Millman 4–6, 7–6^{(7–3)}, 6–3 in the final.

== Seeds ==
1. (Kazakhstan) Alexander Bublik (second round)
2. (United States) Denis Kudla (quarterfinals)
3. (Australia) John Millman (final)
4. (United States) Michael Mmoh (champion)
5. (Republic of Ireland) James McGee (second round)
6. (Australia) John-Patrick Smith (second round)
7. (Australia) Andrew Whittington (first round)
8. (Slovenia) Blaž Rola (second round)

== Draw ==
=== Key ===
- Q = Qualifier
- WC = Wild card
- LL = Lucky loser
- Alt = Alternate
- SE = Special exempt
- PR = Protected ranking
- ITF = ITF entry
- JE = Junior exempt
- w/o = Walkover
- r = Retired
- d = Defaulted
- SR = Special ranking

=== Finals ===
Semifinals
SE	(United Kingdom) Cameron Norrie	1	1
3	(Australia) John Millman	6	6
4	(United States) Michael Mmoh	7^{7}	1	6
(United States) Raymond Sarmiento	6^{4}	6	2

Final
3	(Australia) John Millman	6	6^{3}	3
4	(United States) Michael Mmoh	4	7^{7}	6

=== Top half ===
First round
1	(Kazakhstan) A Bublik	6	6
WC	(United States) Mi Redlicki	3	4
(Germany) D Köpfer	2	6	6
(United Kingdom) E Corrie	6	1	2
PR	(France) Tom Jomby	4	2
(United States) Jared Hiltzik	6	6
SE	(United Kingdom) C Norrie	4	7^{7}	6
7	(Australia) A Whittington	6	6^{5}	2
3	(Australia) J Millman	7	6
Q	(United States) JC Aragone	5	2
(United States) M Giron	6^{1}	0
(South Africa) L Harris	7^{7}	6
(Australia) M Purcell	6	7
Q	(United States) J Witten	4	5
LL	(Australia) Mark Verryth	4	2
8	(Slovenia) B Rola	6	6

Second round
1	(Kazakhstan) A Bublik	4	7	0
(Germany) D Köpfer	6	5	6
(United States) J Hiltzik	4	3
SE	(United Kingdom) C Norrie	6	6
3	(Australia) J Millman	6	6
(South Africa) L Harris	1	1
(Australia) M Purcell	6	4	6
8	(Slovenia) B Rola	1	6	3

Quarterfinals
(Germany) D Köpfer	3	2
SE	(United Kingdom) C Norrie	6	6
3	(Australia) J Millman	4	7^{8}	6
(Australia) M Purcell	6	6^{6}	2

Semifinals
SE	(United Kingdom) C Norrie	1	1
3	(Australia) J Millman	6	6

=== Bottom half ===
First round
5	(Republic of Ireland) J McGee	6	2	7^{8}
Q	(Indonesia) C Rungkat	1	6	6^{6}
(United States) D Nguyen	1	7	6
(New Zealand) J Statham	6	5	4
Q	(United States) Ryan Haviland	6	6
LL	(United States) Trey Yates	3	0
(Australia) L Saville	2	5
4	(United States) M Mmoh	6	7
6	(Australia) J-P Smith	7	4	6
WC	(United States) W Bushamuka	5	6	2
WC	(United States) E Quigley	6^{2}	2
(United States) R Sarmiento	7^{7}	6
WC	(United States) Ma Redlicki	6	3	4
PR	(United States) K King	3	6	6
(Australia) A Bolt	6	4	2
2	(United States) D Kudla	4	6	6

Second round
5	(Republic of Ireland) J McGee	6	3	4
(United States) D Nguyen	3	6	6
Q	(United States) R Haviland	4	4
4	(United States) M Mmoh	6	6
6	(Australia) J-P Smith	6	1	4
(United States) R Sarmiento	4	6	6
PR	(United States) K King	5	7^{7}	1
2	(United States) D Kudla	7	6^{5}	6

Quarterfinals
(United States) D Nguyen	5	1
4	(United States) M Mmoh	7	6
(United States) R Sarmiento	6	6
2	(United States) D Kudla	1	3

Semifinals
4	(United States) M Mmoh	7^{7}	1	6
(United States) R Sarmiento	6^{4}	6	2
