= 2017 ITF Men's Circuit =

International tennis tour

Details
- Duration: 2 January 2017 – 31 December 2017
- Edition: 20th
- Tournaments: 615
- Categories: $25,000 tournaments (139) $15,000 tournaments (476)

Achievements (singles)
- Most titles: (Belgium) Julien Cagnina; (Bolivia) Hugo Dellien; (Austria) Dennis Novak (7)
- Most finals: (Bosnia and Herzegovina) Tomislav Brkić; (Croatia) Nino Serdarušić; (10)

The 2017 ITF Men's Circuit is the 2017 edition of the second-tier tour for men's professional tennis. It is organised by the International Tennis Federation and is a tier below the ATP Tour. The ITF Men's Circuit includes tournaments with prize money ranging from $15,000 up to $25,000.

== Participating host nations ==
- Argentina (ARG)
- Australia (AUS)
- Austria (AUT)
- Bahrain (BHR)
- Belarus (BLR)
- Belgium (BEL)
- Bolivia (BOL)
- Bosnia and Herzegovina (BIH)
- Brazil (BRA)
- Bulgaria (BUL)
- Canada (CAN)
- Chile (CHI)
- China (CHN)
- Chinese Taipei (TPE)
- Colombia (COL)
- Croatia (CRO)
- Czech Republic (CZE)
- Dominican Republic (DOM)
- Egypt (EGY)
- Estonia (EST)
- Finland (FIN)
- France (FRA)
- Georgia (GEO)
- Germany (GER)
- Great Britain (GBR)
- Greece (GRE)
- Guam (GUM)
- Hong Kong (HKG)
- Hungary (HUN)
- India (IND)
- Indonesia (INA)
- Ireland (IRL)
- Israel (ISR)
- Italy (ITA)
- Japan (JPN)
- Kazakhstan (KAZ)
- Kuwait (KUW)
- Latvia (LAT)
- Lithuania (LTU)
- North Macedonia (MKD)
- Malaysia (MAS)
- Mexico (MEX)
- Morocco (MAR)
- Netherlands (NED)
- Nigeria (NGR)
- Pakistan (PAK)
- Peru (PER)
- Poland (POL)
- Portugal (POR)
- Qatar (QAT)
- Romania (ROU)
- Russia (RUS)
- Serbia (SRB)
- Singapore (SGP)
- Slovakia (SVK)
- South Africa (RSA)
- South Korea (KOR)
- Spain (ESP)
- Sri Lanka (SRI)
- Sweden (SWE)
- Switzerland (SUI)
- Thailand (THA)
- Tunisia (TUN)
- Turkey (TUR)
- Ukraine (UKR)
- United States (USA)
- Uzbekistan (UZB)
- Vietnam (VIE)
- Zimbabwe (ZIM)

== Tournament breakdown by event category ==
Event category	Number of events	Total prize money
$25,000	139	$3,475,000
$15,000	476	$7,140,000
Total	615	$10,615,000

== Point distribution ==
Tournament Category	W	F	SF	QF	R16	R32
Futures $25,000+H	35	20	10	4	1	0
Futures $25,000	27	15	8	3	1	0
Futures $15,000	18	10	6	2	1	0

== Statistics ==
These tables present the number of singles (S) and doubles (D) titles won by each player and each nation during the season. The players/nations are sorted by: 1) total number of titles (a doubles title won by two players representing the same nation counts as only one win for the nation); 2) a singles > doubles hierarchy; 3) alphabetical order (by family names for players).

To avoid confusion and double counting, these tables should be updated only after an event is completed.

=== Titles won by player ===
Updated as of December 31

Total	Player	$25K		$15K		Total	
Total	Player	S	D	S	D	S	D
14	Nino Serdarušić (CRO)			5	9	5	9
11	Roberto Ortega Olmedo (ESP)	1	2	4	4	5	6
11	Pedro Martínez (ESP)	2	4	1	4	3	8
11	David Pérez Sanz (ESP)			1	10	1	10
10	João Monteiro (POR)	2		4	4	6	4
10	Gonçalo Oliveira (POR)	2	1	2	5	4	6
10	Nikola Čačić (SRB)		1	1	8	1	9
10	Benjamin Lock (ZIM)			1	9	1	9
10	Vladyslav Manafov (UKR)		3		7	0	10
9	Hugo Dellien (BOL)	2		5	2	7	2
9	Nicolaas Scholtz (RSA)			6	3	6	3
9	Enrique López Pérez (ESP)	1	1	4	3	5	4
9	Ivan Gakhov (RUS)		2	3	4	3	6
9	Facundo Argüello (ARG)			3	6	3	6
9	Tomás Lipovšek Puches (ARG)			1	8	1	8
9	Franco Agamenone (ARG)		1		8	0	9
9	Sem Verbeek (NED)				9	0	9
8	Dennis Novak (AUT)	1		6	1	7	1
8	Tomislav Brkić (BIH)	2		4	2	6	2
8	Filip Peliwo (CAN)	1	1	5	1	6	2
8	Martín Cuevas (URU)		1	6	1	6	2
8	Hernán Casanova (ARG)	1	1	4	2	5	3
8	Sriram Balaji (IND)		2	2	4	2	6
8	Volodymyr Uzhylovskyi (UKR)		2		6	0	8
7	Julien Cagnina (BEL)			7		7	0
7	Javier Martí (ESP)	1	1	5		6	1
7	Tallon Griekspoor (NED)	2	1	3	1	5	2
7	Youssef Hossam (EGY)			5	2	5	2
7	Maximilian Neuchrist (AUT)			4	3	4	3
7	Benjamin Bonzi (FRA)	1	2	2	2	3	4
7	Patricio Heras (ARG)	1		2	4	3	4
7	Oriol Roca Batalla (ESP)			3	4	3	4
7	Yannick Jankovits (FRA)	1	3	1	2	2	5
7	Antoine Hoang (FRA)	1	2	1	3	2	5
7	Adrian Bodmer (SUI)		1	2	4	2	5
7	Rafael Matos (BRA)			2	5	2	5
7	Nathaniel Lammons (USA)		4		3	0	7
7	Ivan Sabanov (CRO)		3		4	0	7
7	Robert Galloway (USA)				7	0	7
6	Andrea Collarini (ARG)			5	1	5	1
6	Scott Griekspoor (NED)			5	1	5	1
6	Chen Ti (TPE)			4	2	4	2
6	Hiroyasu Ehara (JPN)		1	3	2	3	3
6	Oscar Otte (GER)		1	3	2	3	3
6	Alexandre Müller (FRA)			3	3	3	3
6	Markus Eriksson (SWE)		1	2	3	2	4
6	Albano Olivetti (FRA)		1	2	3	2	4
6	Riccardo Bonadio (ITA)			2	4	2	4
6	Grégoire Jacq (FRA)		3	1	2	1	5
6	Fred Gil (POR)		2	1	3	1	5
6	Sho Katayama (JPN)		1	1	4	1	5
6	Takuto Niki (JPN)		1	1	4	1	5
6	Jeroen Vanneste (BEL)			1	5	1	5
6	David Vega Hernández (ESP)		4		2	0	6
6	Matej Sabanov (CRO)		3		3	0	6
6	Vishnu Vardhan (IND)		2		4	0	6
6	Evan King (USA)		1		5	0	6
6	Federico Zeballos (BOL)		1		5	0	6
5	Karim-Mohamed Maamoun (EGY)			5		5	0
5	Attila Balázs (HUN)	2		2	1	4	1
5	Geoffrey Blancaneaux (FRA)	2		2	1	4	1
5	Jan Choinski (GER)	1		3	1	4	1
5	David Guez (FRA)		1	4		4	1
5	Václav Šafránek (CZE)	2	1	1	1	3	2
5	Carlos Boluda-Purkiss (ESP)		1	3	1	3	2
5	Evgeny Karlovskiy (RUS)		1	3	1	3	2
5	Daniel Dutra da Silva (BRA)			3	2	3	2
5	Carlos Gómez-Herrera (ESP)			3	2	3	2
5	Kaichi Uchida (JPN)	1	3	1		2	3
5	Sora Fukuda (JPN)	1		1	3	2	3
5	Viktor Durasovic (NOR)		1	2	2	2	3
5	Corentin Denolly (FRA)			2	3	2	3
5	Robin Kern (GER)			2	3	2	3
5	Mariano Kestelboim (ARG)			2	3	2	3
5	Cristian Rodríguez (COL)			2	3	2	3
5	Li Zhe (CHN)	1	4			1	4
5	Boy Westerhof (NED)	1			4	1	4
5	Shintaro Imai (JPN)		2	1	2	1	4
5	Bruno Sant'Anna (BRA)		1	1	3	1	4
5	Chung Hong (KOR)			1	4	1	4
5	Zdeněk Kolář (CZE)			1	4	1	4
5	Pol Toledo Bagué (ESP)			1	4	1	4
5	Peter Torebko (GER)			1	4	1	4
5	Matías Zukas (ARG)			1	4	1	4
5	Isak Arvidsson (SWE)		2		3	0	5
5	Nuno Deus (POR)		2		3	0	5
5	Dane Propoggia (AUS)		2		3	0	5
5	Artem Smirnov (UKR)		2		3	0	5
5	Andrea Vavassori (ITA)		2		3	0	5
5	Marco Bortolotti (ITA)		1		4	0	5
5	Alexander Pavlioutchenkov (RUS)		1		4	0	5
5	Hunter Reese (USA)		1		4	0	5
5	Botic van de Zandschulp (NED)		1		4	0	5
5	Francis Alcantara (PHI)				5	0	5
5	Adrian Andrzejczuk (POL)				5	0	5
5	Boris Arias (BOL)				5	0	5
5	Gábor Borsos (HUN)				5	0	5
5	Raul Brancaccio (ITA)				5	0	5
5	Anis Ghorbel (TUN)				5	0	5
5	Bernardo Saraiva (POR)				5	0	5
5	Marcelo Zormann (BRA)				5	0	5
4	Sumit Nagal (IND)	1		3		4	0
4	Thiemo de Bakker (NED)			4		4	0
4	Filip Horanský (SVK)			4		4	0
4	Marsel İlhan (TUR)			4		4	0
4	Marek Jaloviec (CZE)			4		4	0
4	Ivan Nedelko (RUS)			4		4	0
4	Mats Moraing (GER)	3	1			3	1
4	Lucas Catarina (MON)	1		2	1	3	1
4	Sebastian Fanselow (GER)	1		2	1	3	1
4	Sergio Gutiérrez Ferrol (ESP)	1		2	1	3	1
4	Dmitry Popko (KAZ)	1		2	1	3	1
4	Stefano Travaglia (ITA)	1		2	1	3	1
4	Roberto Cid Subervi (DOM)		1	3		3	1
4	Christopher Heyman (BEL)		1	3		3	1
4	Paweł Ciaś (POL)			3	1	3	1
4	Laurynas Grigelis (LTU)			3	1	3	1
4	Ricardo Ojeda Lara (ESP)			3	1	3	1
4	Max Purcell (AUS)			3	1	3	1
4	Aldin Šetkić (BIH)			3	1	3	1
4	Yang Tsung-hua (TPE)			3	1	3	1
4	Sanjar Fayziev (UZB)	2	1		1	2	2
4	Kevin King (USA)	1	1	1	1	2	2
4	Kamil Majchrzak (POL)	1		1	2	2	2
4	Marc Giner (ESP)		2	2		2	2
4	Nuno Borges (POR)		1	2	1	2	2
4	Julian Lenz (GER)		1	2	1	2	2
4	Mick Lescure (FRA)		1	2	1	2	2
4	Alexis Musialek (FRA)		1	2	1	2	2
4	Mario Vilella Martínez (ESP)		1	2	1	2	2
4	Filippo Baldi (ITA)			2	2	2	2
4	Elliot Benchetrit (FRA)			2	2	2	2
4	Daniel Elahi Galán (COL)			2	2	2	2
4	Antoine Escoffier (FRA)			2	2	2	2
4	Bradley Mousley (AUS)	1	3			1	3
4	Javier Barranco Cosano (ESP)	1			3	1	3
4	Cristian Carli (ITA)		1	1	2	1	3
4	Pascal Meis (GER)		1	1	2	1	3
4	Ronnie Schneider (USA)		1	1	2	1	3
4	Juan Manuel Benítez Chavarriaga (COL)			1	3	1	3
4	Altuğ Çelikbilek (TUR)			1	3	1	3
4	Gerard Granollers (ESP)			1	3	1	3
4	Harri Heliövaara (FIN)			1	3	1	3
4	Pietro Rondoni (ITA)			1	3	1	3
4	Pedro Sakamoto (BRA)			1	3	1	3
4	Yaraslav Shyla (BLR)			1	3	1	3
4	Marc Fornell Mestres (ESP)		3		1	0	4
4	Justin Barki (INA)		2		2	0	4
4	Francisco Cabral (POR)		2		2	0	4
4	Jonathan Kanar (FRA)		2		2	0	4
4	Scott Puodziunas (AUS)		2		2	0	4
4	Christopher Rungkat (INA)		2		2	0	4
4	Luca Margaroli (SUI)		1		3	0	4
4	Sergio Martos Gornés (ESP)		1		3	0	4
4	Milos Sekulic (SWE)		1		3	0	4
4	Christopher Díaz Figueroa (GUA)				4	0	4
4	Marek Gengel (CZE)				4	0	4
4	Patrick Grigoriu (ROU)				4	0	4
4	Caio Silva (BRA)				4	0	4
4	Chandril Sood (IND)				4	0	4
4	Lakshit Sood (IND)				4	0	4
4	Thales Turini (BRA)				4	0	4
3	Dayne Kelly (AUS)	3				3	0
3	Peđa Krstin (SRB)	3				3	0
3	Corentin Moutet (FRA)	2		1		3	0
3	Matteo Viola (ITA)	2		1		3	0
3	Bernabé Zapata Miralles (ESP)	2		1		3	0
3	Pedro Cachin (ARG)	1		2		3	0
3	Tom Farquharson (GBR)	1		2		3	0
3	Prajnesh Gunneswaran (IND)	1		2		3	0
3	Yannick Mertens (BEL)	1		2		3	0
3	Daniel Nguyen (USA)	1		2		3	0
3	Yusuke Takahashi (JPN)	1		2		3	0
3	Jürgen Zopp (EST)	1		2		3	0
3	Enzo Couacaud (FRA)			3		3	0
3	João Domingues (POR)			3		3	0
3	Lenny Hampel (AUT)			3		3	0
3	Miomir Kecmanović (SRB)			3		3	0
3	Kim Cheong-eui (KOR)			3		3	0
3	Pavel Kotov (RUS)			3		3	0
3	Edan Leshem (ISR)			3		3	0
3	Sasikumar Mukund (IND)			3		3	0
3	Alexey Vatutin (RUS)			3		3	0
3	Miljan Zekić (SRB)			3		3	0
3	Federico Gaio (ITA)	2	1			2	1
3	Andrea Pellegrino (ITA)	2	1			2	1
3	Marc Polmans (AUS)	2	1			2	1
3	Alexander Sarkissian (USA)	2	1			2	1
3	Daniel Altmaier (GER)	1	1	1		2	1
3	Daniel Gimeno Traver (ESP)	1	1	1		2	1
3	Christian Lindell (SWE)	1	1	1		2	1
3	Mohamed Safwat (EGY)	1	1	1		2	1
3	Constant Lestienne (FRA)	1		1	1	2	1
3	Danilo Petrović (SRB)	1		1	1	2	1
3	Ryan Shane (USA)	1		1	1	2	1
3	Alessandro Bega (ITA)		1	2		2	1
3	Frederico Ferreira Silva (POR)		1	2		2	1
3	Marvin Netuschil (GER)		1	2		2	1
3	Yannick Vandenbulcke (BEL)		1	2		2	1
3	Juan Ignacio Galarza (ARG)			2	1	2	1
3	Petr Michnev (CZE)			2	1	2	1
3	Jaume Munar (ESP)			2	1	2	1
3	Denys Mylokostov (UKR)			2	1	2	1
3	Ramkumar Ramanathan (IND)			2	1	2	1
3	Evgeny Tyurnev (RUS)			2	1	2	1
3	Sun Fajing (CHN)	1	2			1	2
3	Niels Desein (BEL)	1	1		1	1	2
3	João Menezes (BRA)	1	1		1	1	2
3	Fabien Reboul (FRA)	1			2	1	2
3	Hubert Hurkacz (POL)		1	1	1	1	2
3	Vasile Antonescu (ROU)			1	2	1	2
3	Pascal Brunner (AUT)			1	2	1	2
3	Mor Bulis (ISR)			1	2	1	2
3	Gonzalo Escobar (ECU)			1	2	1	2
3	Marc-Andrea Hüsler (SUI)			1	2	1	2
3	Arjun Kadhe (IND)			1	2	1	2
3	Danylo Kalenichenko (UKR)			1	2	1	2
3	Jurabek Karimov (UZB)			1	2	1	2
3	Michal Konečný (CZE)			1	2	1	2
3	Lucas Miedler (AUT)			1	2	1	2
3	Tomáš Papík (CZE)			1	2	1	2
3	José Pereira (BRA)			1	2	1	2
3	David Pichler (AUT)			1	2	1	2
3	Juan Carlos Sáez (CHI)			1	2	1	2
3	Mikael Torpegaard (DEN)			1	2	1	2
3	Tak Khunn Wang (FRA)			1	2	1	2
3	Denis Yevseyev (KAZ)			1	2	1	2
3	Gao Xin (CHN)		3			0	3
3	Alex Lawson (USA)		3			0	3
3	Frederik Nielsen (DEN)		3			0	3
3	Marat Deviatiarov (UKR)		2		1	0	3
3	Yates Johnson (USA)		2		1	0	3
3	Nathan Pasha (USA)		2		1	0	3
3	Walter Trusendi (ITA)		2		1	0	3
3	Dan Added (FRA)		1		2	0	3
3	Pedro Bernardi (BRA)		1		2	0	3
3	Maxime Chazal (FRA)		1		2	0	3
3	Scott Clayton (GBR)		1		2	0	3
3	Erik Crepaldi (ITA)		1		2	0	3
3	Ruben Gonzales (PHI)		1		2	0	3
3	Alexandru Gozun (MDA)		1		2	0	3
3	Miķelis Lībietis (LAT)		1		2	0	3
3	Grzegorz Panfil (POL)		1		2	0	3
3	Jaume Pla Malfeito (ESP)		1		2	0	3
3	Connor Smith (USA)		1		2	0	3
3	Jakob Sude (GER)		1		2	0	3
3	Joran Vliegen (BEL)		1		2	0	3
3	Hugo Voljacques (FRA)		1		2	0	3
3	Rhyne Williams (USA)		1		2	0	3
3	Dekel Bar (ISR)				3	0	3
3	Adrian Barbu (ROU)				3	0	3
3	Domagoj Bilješko (CRO)				3	0	3
3	Victor Vlad Cornea (ROU)				3	0	3
3	Felipe Cunha e Silva (POR)				3	0	3
3	Matías Franco Descotte (ARG)				3	0	3
3	Diego Hidalgo (ECU)				3	0	3
3	Luke Johnson (GBR)				3	0	3
3	Jannis Kahlke (GER)				3	0	3
3	Dominik Kellovský (CZE)				3	0	3
3	Olexiy Kolisnyk (UKR)				3	0	3
3	Denys Molchanov (UKR)				3	0	3
3	Soichiro Moritani (JPN)				3	0	3
3	Jordi Muñoz Abreu (VEN)				3	0	3
3	Patrik Niklas-Salminen (FIN)				3	0	3
3	Junior Alexander Ore (USA)				3	0	3
3	Lamine Ouahab (MAR)				3	0	3
3	Vladimir Polyakov (RUS)				3	0	3
3	Oleg Prihodko (UKR)				3	0	3
3	Sami Reinwein (GER)				3	0	3
3	Masato Shiga (JPN)				3	0	3
3	Raleigh Smith (USA)				3	0	3
3	Alejandro Tabilo (CHI)				3	0	3
3	Matěj Vocel (CZE)				3	0	3
3	Szymon Walków (POL)				3	0	3
2	Salvatore Caruso (ITA)	2				2	0
2	Juan Pablo Ficovich (ARG)	2				2	0
2	Marcos Giron (USA)	2				2	0
2	Christian Harrison (USA)	2				2	0
2	Brayden Schnur (CAN)	2				2	0
2	Alexander Ward (GBR)	2				2	0
2	Calvin Hemery (FRA)	1		1		2	0
2	Dominik Köpfer (GER)	1		1		2	0
2	Axel Michon (FRA)	1		1		2	0
2	Tommy Paul (USA)	1		1		2	0
2	Gleb Sakharov (FRA)	1		1		2	0
2	Renta Tokuda (JPN)	1		1		2	0
2	Wang Chuhan (CHN)	1		1		2	0
2	Yosuke Watanuki (JPN)	1		1		2	0
2	Dzmitry Zhyrmont (BLR)	1		1		2	0
2	Romain Barbosa (BEL)			2		2	0
2	Nicolae Frunză (ROU)			2		2	0
2	Michael Linzer (AUT)			2		2	0
2	Yannick Maden (GER)			2		2	0
2	Guillermo Olaso (ESP)			2		2	0
2	Jose Statham (NZL)			2		2	0
2	Maxime Tabatruong (FRA)			2		2	0
2	Maverick Banes (AUS)	1	1			1	1
2	Christopher Eubanks (USA)	1	1			1	1
2	Gustav Hansson (SWE)	1	1			1	1
2	Mackenzie McDonald (USA)	1	1			1	1
2	Samuel Monette (CAN)	1	1			1	1
2	Zhang Zhizhen (CHN)	1	1			1	1
2	Liam Caruana (ITA)	1			1	1	1
2	Jared Hiltzik (USA)	1			1	1	1
2	Ugo Humbert (FRA)	1			1	1	1
2	Thai-Son Kwiatkowski (USA)	1			1	1	1
2	Lorenzo Frigerio (ITA)		1	1		1	1
2	Lloyd Glasspool (GBR)		1	1		1	1
2	He Yecong (CHN)		1	1		1	1
2	Lý Hoàng Nam (VIE)		1	1		1	1
2	Roberto Quiroz (ECU)		1	1		1	1
2	Wishaya Trongcharoenchaikul (THA)		1	1		1	1
2	Marcelo Tomás Barrios Vera (CHI)			1	1	1	1
2	Gijs Brouwer (NED)			1	1	1	1
2	Ljubomir Čelebić (MNE)			1	1	1	1
2	Alex De Minaur (AUS)			1	1	1	1
2	Steven Diez (CAN)			1	1	1	1
2	Cem İlkel (TUR)			1	1	1	1
2	Maxime Hamou (FRA)			1	1	1	1
2	Kim Young-seok (KOR)			1	1	1	1
2	Kirill Kivattsev (RUS)			1	1	1	1
2	Dimitar Kuzmanov (BUL)			1	1	1	1
2	Jonas Lütjen (GER)			1	1	1	1
2	Daniel Masur (GER)			1	1	1	1
2	Facundo Mena (ARG)			1	1	1	1
2	Marvin Möller (GER)			1	1	1	1
2	Pavel Nejedlý (CZE)			1	1	1	1
2	Sebastian Ofner (AUT)			1	1	1	1
2	Fabrizio Ornago (ITA)			1	1	1	1
2	Laurent Rochette (FRA)			1	1	1	1
2	Karue Sell (BRA)			1	1	1	1
2	Thiago Seyboth Wild (BRA)			1	1	1	1
2	Thomas Statzberger (AUT)			1	1	1	1
2	Johan Tatlot (FRA)			1	1	1	1
2	Alexander Vasilenko (RUS)			1	1	1	1
2	Pablo Vivero González (ESP)			1	1	1	1
2	Harrison Adams (USA)		2			0	2
2	Luke Bambridge (GBR)		2			0	2
2	Andrea Basso (ITA)		2			0	2
2	Harry Bourchier (AUS)		2			0	2
2	Viktor Galović (CRO)		2			0	2
2	Brandon Holt (USA)		2			0	2
2	Austin Krajicek (USA)		2			0	2
2	Dennis Nevolo (USA)		2			0	2
2	David O'Hare (IRL)		2			0	2
2	Fabiano de Paula (BRA)		2			0	2
2	Fernando Romboli (BRA)		2			0	2
2	Miguel Semmler (ESP)		2			0	2
2	Fred Simonsson (SWE)		2			0	2
2	Riley Smith (USA)		2			0	2
2	Corrado Summaria (ITA)		2			0	2
2	Jackson Withrow (USA)		2			0	2
2	Sarp Ağabigün (TUR)		1		1	0	2
2	Deiton Baughman (USA)		1		1	0	2
2	Alex Bolt (AUS)		1		1	0	2
2	Hunter Callahan (USA)		1		1	0	2
2	Edward Corrie (GBR)		1		1	0	2
2	Michał Dembek (POL)		1		1	0	2
2	Omar Giacalone (ITA)		1		1	0	2
2	Sander Gillé (BEL)		1		1	0	2
2	Johannes Härteis (GER)		1		1	0	2
2	Nicholas Hu (USA)		1		1	0	2
2	Hunter Johnson (USA)		1		1	0	2
2	Hung Jui-chen (TPE)		1		1	0	2
2	Vít Kopřiva (CZE)		1		1	0	2
2	Niels Lootsma (NED)		1		1	0	2
2	Dragoș Nicolae Mădăraș (SWE)		1		1	0	2
2	Jan Mertl (CZE)		1		1	0	2
2	Hugo Nys (FRA)		1		1	0	2
2	Jonny O'Mara (GBR)		1		1	0	2
2	Jaroslav Pospíšil (CZE)		1		1	0	2
2	Vijay Sundar Prashanth (IND)		1		1	0	2
2	Tom Schönenberg (GER)		1		1	0	2
2	Jacopo Stefanini (ITA)		1		1	0	2
2	Mark Vervoort (NED)		1		1	0	2
2	Tuna Altuna (TUR)				2	0	2
2	Felipe Meligeni Alves (BRA)				2	0	2
2	Victor-Mugurel Anagnastopol (ROU)				2	0	2
2	Victor Baluda (RUS)				2	0	2
2	Colin van Beem (NED)				2	0	2
2	Antoine Bellier (SUI)				2	0	2
2	Peter Bothwell (IRL)				2	0	2
2	Rémi Boutillier (FRA)				2	0	2
2	Jordan Correia (BRA)				2	0	2
2	Mirko Cutuli (ITA)				2	0	2
2	Hugo Di Feo (CAN)				2	0	2
2	Gianluca Di Nicola (ITA)				2	0	2
2	Aziz Dougaz (TUN)				2	0	2
2	Karol Drzewiecki (POL)				2	0	2
2	Filip Duda (CZE)				2	0	2
2	Franco Emanuel Egea (ARG)				2	0	2
2	Alexander Erler (AUT)				2	0	2
2	Quentin Folliot (FRA)				2	0	2
2	Richard Gabb (GBR)				2	0	2
2	Daniel Garza (MEX)				2	0	2
2	Arjun Goveas (IND)				2	0	2
2	Matthias Haim (AUT)				2	0	2
2	Pruchya Isaro (THA)				2	0	2
2	Darko Jandrić (SRB)				2	0	2
2	Mircea-Alexandru Jecan (ROU)				2	0	2
2	David Jordà Sanchis (ESP)				2	0	2
2	Aqeel Khan (PAK)				2	0	2
2	Shahzad Khan (PAK)				2	0	2
2	Kim Hyun-joon (KOR)				2	0	2
2	Yanais Laurent (FRA)				2	0	2
2	Juan Ignacio Londero (ARG)				2	0	2
2	Orlando Luz (BRA)				2	0	2
2	Skander Mansouri (TUN)				2	0	2
2	Igor Marcondes (BRA)				2	0	2
2	Louroi Martinez (SUI)				2	0	2
2	George von Massow (GER)				2	0	2
2	Jonas Merckx (BEL)				2	0	2
2	Florin Mergea (ROU)				2	0	2
2	Katsuki Nagao (JPN)				2	0	2
2	Noh Sang-woo (KOR)				2	0	2
2	Petr Nouza (CZE)				2	0	2
2	Julian Ocleppo (ITA)				2	0	2
2	Hiromasu Oku (JPN)				2	0	2
2	Manuel Peña López (ARG)				2	0	2
2	David Poljak (CZE)				2	0	2
2	Jaime Pulgar-García (ESP)				2	0	2
2	Manuel Sánchez (MEX)				2	0	2
2	Karunuday Singh (IND)				2	0	2
2	David Škoch (CZE)				2	0	2
2	Maciej Smoła (POL)				2	0	2
2	Song Min-kyu (KOR)				2	0	2
2	Issam Haitham Taweel (EGY)				2	0	2
2	Adam Taylor (AUS)				2	0	2
2	Jason Taylor (AUS)				2	0	2
2	Wang Aoran (CHN)				2	0	2
2	Anıl Yüksel (TUR)				2	0	2
2	Danill Zarichanskyy (UKR)				2	0	2
2	Michael Zhu (USA)				2	0	2
1	Félix Auger-Aliassime (CAN)	1				1	0
1	Maxime Authom (BEL)	1				1	0
1	Matthias Bachinger (GER)	1				1	0
1	Matteo Berrettini (ITA)	1				1	0
1	Ulises Blanch (USA)	1				1	0
1	Adrien Bossel (SUI)	1				1	0
1	Marco Cecchinato (ITA)	1				1	0
1	Edoardo Eremin (ITA)	1				1	0
1	Eduard Esteve Lobato (ESP)	1				1	0
1	Egor Gerasimov (BLR)	1				1	0
1	Andrew Harris (AUS)	1				1	0
1	Lee Duck-hee (KOR)	1				1	0
1	Gianluca Mager (ITA)	1				1	0
1	Nikola Milojević (SRB)	1				1	0
1	Daniel Muñoz de la Nava (ESP)	1				1	0
1	Emil Ruusuvuori (FIN)	1				1	0
1	Denis Shapovalov (CAN)	1				1	0
1	Lorenzo Sonego (ITA)	1				1	0
1	Adelchi Virgili (ITA)	1				1	0
1	Aleksandar Vukic (AUS)	1				1	0
1	J. J. Wolf (USA)	1				1	0
1	Mikael Ymer (SWE)	1				1	0
1	Andrés Artuñedo (ESP)			1		1	0
1	Bai Yan (CHN)			1		1	0
1	Riccardo Bellotti (ITA)			1		1	0
1	Yuki Bhambri (IND)			1		1	0
1	Daniel Brands (GER)			1		1	0
1	Thomas Bréchemier (FRA)			1		1	0
1	Adam Chadaj (POL)			1		1	0
1	Jay Clarke (GBR)			1		1	0
1	Kimmer Coppejans (BEL)			1		1	0
1	Baptiste Crepatte (FRA)			1		1	0
1	Gibril Diarra (AUT)			1		1	0
1	Dragoș Dima (ROU)			1		1	0
1	Laslo Đere (SRB)			1		1	0
1	Marko Djokovic (SRB)			1		1	0
1	Milan Drinić (SRB)			1		1	0
1	Moez Echargui (TUN)			1		1	0
1	Elmar Ejupovic (GER)			1		1	0
1	Marcel Felder (URU)			1		1	0
1	André Gaspar Murta (POR)			1		1	0
1	Oliver Golding (GBR)			1		1	0
1	Emilio Gómez (ECU)			1		1	0
1	Jonathan Gray (GBR)			1		1	0
1	Hugo Grenier (FRA)			1		1	0
1	Jacob Grills (AUS)			1		1	0
1	José Hernández-Fernández (DOM)			1		1	0
1	Tatsuma Ito (JPN)			1		1	0
1	Tomislav Jotovski (MKD)			1		1	0
1	Aslan Karatsev (RUS)			1		1	0
1	Roman Khassanov (KAZ)			1		1	0
1	Brydan Klein (GBR)			1		1	0
1	Nicola Kuhn (ESP)			1		1	0
1	Patrick Kypson (USA)			1		1	0
1	Alexander Lazov (BUL)			1		1	0
1	Lee Kuan-yi (TPE)			1		1	0
1	Felipe Mantilla (COL)			1		1	0
1	Tristan Meraut (FRA)			1		1	0
1	Lény Mitjana (FRA)			1		1	0
1	Yuki Mochizuki (JPN)			1		1	0
1	Jonathan Mridha (SWE)			1		1	0
1	Yshai Oliel (ISR)			1		1	0
1	Alexei Popyrin (AUS)			1		1	0
1	Tim Pütz (GER)			1		1	0
1	Maciej Rajski (POL)			1		1	0
1	Pere Riba (ESP)			1		1	0
1	Patrik Rikl (CZE)			1		1	0
1	Alex Rybakov (USA)			1		1	0
1	Roman Safiullin (RUS)			1		1	0
1	Jordi Samper Montaña (ESP)			1		1	0
1	Marc Sieber (GER)			1		1	0
1	Ronald Slobodchikov (RUS)			1		1	0
1	Evan Song (USA)			1		1	0
1	Marko Tepavac (SRB)			1		1	0
1	Wu Yibing (CHN)			1		1	0
1	Bogdan Ionuț Apostol (ROU)		1			0	1
1	Riccardo Balzerani (ITA)		1			0	1
1	Grégoire Barrère (FRA)		1			0	1
1	Sidney de Boer (NED)		1			0	1
1	Tiago Cacão (POR)		1			0	1
1	Íñigo Cervantes (ESP)		1			0	1
1	Chiu Yu-hsiang (TPE)		1			0	1
1	Guilherme Clezar (BRA)		1			0	1
1	Federico Coria (ARG)		1			0	1
1	Blake Ellis (AUS)		1			0	1
1	Hans Hach Verdugo (MEX)		1			0	1
1	Alexios Halebian (USA)		1			0	1
1	Yannick Hanfmann (GER)		1			0	1
1	Aron Hiltzik (USA)		1			0	1
1	Patrick Kawka (USA)		1			0	1
1	Timur Khabibulin (KAZ)		1			0	1
1	Bradley Klahn (USA)		1			0	1
1	Mateusz Kowalczyk (POL)		1			0	1
1	Florian Lakat (FRA)		1			0	1
1	Luis David Martínez (VEN)		1			0	1
1	Toshihide Matsui (JPN)		1			0	1
1	Denis Matsukevich (RUS)		1			0	1
1	Roberto Maytín (VEN)		1			0	1
1	Andreas Mies (GER)		1			0	1
1	Alessandro Motti (ITA)		1			0	1
1	Daniel Nolan (AUS)		1			0	1
1	David Pel (NED)		1			0	1
1	Darren Polkinghorne (AUS)		1			0	1
1	Florian Reynet (FRA)		1			0	1
1	Arthur Rinderknech (FRA)		1			0	1
1	Keegan Smith (USA)		1			0	1
1	Te Rigele (CHN)		1			0	1
1	Marco Trungelliti (ARG)		1			0	1
1	Gavin van Peperzeel (AUS)		1			0	1
1	Shane Vinsant (USA)		1			0	1
1	Yi Chi-huan (TPE)		1			0	1
1	Aaron Addison (AUS)				1	0	1
1	Amina Ahouda (MAR)				1	0	1
1	Vadim Alekseenko (UKR)				1	0	1
1	Daniel Appelgren (SWE)				1	0	1
1	Raphael Baltensperger (SUI)				1	0	1
1	Alberto Barroso Campos (ESP)				1	0	1
1	Constant de la Bassetière (FRA)				1	0	1
1	Romain Bauvy (FRA)				1	0	1
1	José Daniel Bendeck (COL)				1	0	1
1	Constantin Bittoun Kouzmine (FRA)				1	0	1
1	Alex Blumenberg (BRA)				1	0	1
1	Darko Bojanović (BIH)				1	0	1
1	Sébastien Boltz (FRA)				1	0	1
1	Charles Broom (GBR)				1	0	1
1	Nicholas Bybel (USA)				1	0	1
1	Joel Cannell (GBR)				1	0	1
1	Nick Chappell (USA)				1	0	1
1	Ankit Chopra (IND)				1	0	1
1	Petar Čonkić (SRB)				1	0	1
1	Maxime Cressy (FRA)				1	0	1
1	Rrezart Cungu (MNE)				1	0	1
1	Ivan Davydov (RUS)				1	0	1
1	Davide Della Tommasina (ITA)				1	0	1
1	Florent Diep (FRA)				1	0	1
1	Eduardo Dischinger (BRA)				1	0	1
1	Julien Dubail (BEL)				1	0	1
1	Daniiar Duldaev (KGZ)				1	0	1
1	Mauricio Echazú (PER)				1	0	1
1	Shahar Elbaz (ISR)				1	0	1
1	Alon Elia (ISR)				1	0	1
1	Iván Endara (ECU)				1	0	1
1	Nathan Eshmade (AUS)				1	0	1
1	Maximiliano Estévez (ARG)				1	0	1
1	Florian Fallert (GER)				1	0	1
1	Thomas Fancutt (AUS)				1	0	1
1	Connor Farren (USA)				1	0	1
1	Nerman Fatić (BIH)				1	0	1
1	Franco Feitt (ARG)				1	0	1
1	Andrés Fernández Cánovas (ESP)				1	0	1
1	Viktor Filipenkó (HUN)				1	0	1
1	Giovanni Fonio (ITA)				1	0	1
1	Linus Frost (SWE)				1	0	1
1	Mark Fynn (ZIM)				1	0	1
1	Tommaso Gabrieli (ITA)				1	0	1
1	Clément Geens (BEL)				1	0	1
1	Dante Gennaro (ARG)				1	0	1
1	Riccardo Ghedin (ITA)				1	0	1
1	Alejandro Gómez (COL)				1	0	1
1	Juan Sebastián Gómez (COL)				1	0	1
1	Farris Fathi Gosea (GBR)				1	0	1
1	Marvin Greven (GER)				1	0	1
1	Kevin Griekspoor (NED)				1	0	1
1	Manuel Guinard (FRA)				1	0	1
1	Hady Habib (USA)				1	0	1
1	Petr Hájek (CZE)				1	0	1
1	Billy Harris (GBR)				1	0	1
1	Peter Heller (GER)				1	0	1
1	Gabriel Alejandro Hidalgo (ARG)				1	0	1
1	Christian Hirschmüller (GER)				1	0	1
1	Huang Liang-chi (TPE)				1	0	1
1	Alexander Igoshin (RUS)				1	0	1
1	Miki Janković (SRB)				1	0	1
1	Jeong Young-hoon (KOR)				1	0	1
1	Nuttanon Kadchapanan (THA)				1	0	1
1	Jessy Kalambay (SUI)				1	0	1
1	Ivan Kalinin (RUS)				1	0	1
1	Markos Kalovelonis (RUS)				1	0	1
1	Patcharapol Kawin (THA)				1	0	1
1	Filipp Kekercheni (UKR)				1	0	1
1	Markus Kerner (EST)				1	0	1
1	Alexis Klégou (BEN)				1	0	1
1	Lukáš Klein (SVK)				1	0	1
1	Tom Kočevar-Dešman (SLO)				1	0	1
1	Tim Kopinski (USA)				1	0	1
1	Palaphoom Kovapitukted (THA)				1	0	1
1	Michiel de Krom (NED)				1	0	1
1	Jason Kubler (AUS)				1	0	1
1	Clément Larrière (FRA)				1	0	1
1	Alexandar Lazarov (BUL)				1	0	1
1	Lee Jea-moon (KOR)				1	0	1
1	Lee Tae-woo (KOR)				1	0	1
1	Wilson Leite (BRA)				1	0	1
1	Filippo Leonardi (ITA)				1	0	1
1	Pietro Licciardi (ITA)				1	0	1
1	Lim Yong-kyu (KOR)				1	0	1
1	Lennert van der Linden (NED)				1	0	1
1	Ivan Liutarevich (BLR)				1	0	1
1	Marc López (ESP)				1	0	1
1	Kristian Lozan (RUS)				1	0	1
1	Tyler Lu (USA)				1	0	1
1	Petru-Alexandru Luncanu (ROU)				1	0	1
1	Bruno Mardones (ESP)				1	0	1
1	Santiago Maresca (URU)				1	0	1
1	Goran Marković (SRB)				1	0	1
1	James Marsalek (GBR)				1	0	1
1	Antonio Massara (ITA)				1	0	1
1	Piotr Matuszewski (POL)				1	0	1
1	Rudolf Molleker (GER)				1	0	1
1	Jorge Montero (CHI)				1	0	1
1	Moon Ju-hae (KOR)				1	0	1
1	Ewan Moore (GBR)				1	0	1
1	Richard Muzaev (RUS)				1	0	1
1	Péter Nagy (HUN)				1	0	1
1	Jirat Navasirisomboon (THA)				1	0	1
1	Christoph Negritu (GER)				1	0	1
1	Patrik Néma (SVK)				1	0	1
1	Miliaan Niesten (NED)				1	0	1
1	Issei Okamura (JPN)				1	0	1
1	José Olivares (DOM)				1	0	1
1	Lukas Ollert (GER)				1	0	1
1	Arata Onozawa (JPN)				1	0	1
1	Elliott Orkin (USA)				1	0	1
1	Victor Ouvrard (FRA)				1	0	1
1	Jorge Panta (PER)				1	0	1
1	Luis Patiño (MEX)				1	0	1
1	Neil Pauffley (GBR)				1	0	1
1	Ante Pavić (CRO)				1	0	1
1	Juan Pablo Paz (ARG)				1	0	1
1	Ryan Peniston (GBR)				1	0	1
1	Gabriel Petit (FRA)				1	0	1
1	Alessandro Petrone (ITA)				1	0	1
1	Marcelo Plaza (CHI)				1	0	1
1	Giorgio Portaluri (ITA)				1	0	1
1	Rhett Purcell (GBR)				1	0	1
1	Nik Razboršek (SLO)				1	0	1
1	Santiago Rodríguez Taverna (ARG)				1	0	1
1	Patrik Rosenholm (SWE)				1	0	1
1	Cristóbal Saavedra Corvalán (CHI)				1	0	1
1	Sherif Sabry (EGY)				1	0	1
1	Yuto Sakai (JPN)				1	0	1
1	Giovani Samaha (LBN)				1	0	1
1	Masaki Sasai (JPN)				1	0	1
1	Rene Schulte (GER)				1	0	1
1	Miles Seemann (USA)				1	0	1
1	Jelle Sels (NED)				1	0	1
1	Tobias Simon (GER)				1	0	1
1	Colin Sinclair (USA)				1	0	1
1	Sanam Singh (IND)				1	0	1
1	Riccardo Sinicropi (ITA)				1	0	1
1	Barnaby Smith (GBR)				1	0	1
1	Glenn Smits (NED)				1	0	1
1	Mateusz Smolicki (POL)				1	0	1
1	João Pedro Sorgi (BRA)				1	0	1
1	David Souto (VEN)				1	0	1
1	Wil Spencer (USA)				1	0	1
1	Kelsey Stevenson (CAN)				1	0	1
1	Tomas Stillman (USA)				1	0	1
1	Lukas Storck (GER)				1	0	1
1	Clément Tabur (FRA)				1	0	1
1	Shunrou Takeshima (JPN)				1	0	1
1	Kento Takeuchi (JPN)				1	0	1
1	Yunosuke Tanaka (JPN)				1	0	1
1	Louis Tessa (FRA)				1	0	1
1	Bastian Trinker (AUT)				1	0	1
1	Nicolò Turchetti (ITA)				1	0	1
1	Jordan Ubiergo (FRA)				1	0	1
1	Kaito Uesugi (JPN)				1	0	1
1	Camilo Ugo Carabelli (ARG)				1	0	1
1	Juan Pablo Varillas (PER)				1	0	1
1	Artem Vasheshnikov (UKR)				1	0	1
1	Antun Vidak (CRO)				1	0	1
1	Thibault Venturino (FRA)				1	0	1
1	François-Arthur Vibert (FRA)				1	0	1
1	Francesco Vilardo (ITA)				1	0	1
1	Gonzalo Villanueva (ARG)				1	0	1
1	Brandon Walkin (AUS)				1	0	1
1	Andrew Watson (GBR)				1	0	1
1	Damien Wenger (SUI)				1	0	1
1	Louis Wessels (GER)				1	0	1
1	Johann Willems (GER)				1	0	1
1	Marcus Willis (GBR)				1	0	1
1	Yu Cheng-yu (TPE)				1	0	1
1	Evan Zhu (USA)				1	0	1
1	Kacper Żuk (POL)				1	0	1

=== Titles won by nation ===
Updated as of December 31

Total	Nation	$25K		$15K		Total	
Total	Nation	S	D	S	D	S	D
120	Spain (ESP)	12	16	47	45	59	61
113	France (FRA)	13	14	45	41	58	55
91	United States (USA)	16	25	9	41	25	66
74	Italy (ITA)	16	12	15	31	31	43
72	Germany (GER)	8	8	27	29	35	37
66	Argentina (ARG)	5	4	23	34	28	38
45	Portugal (POR)	4	7	15	19	19	26
45	Brazil (BRA)	1	5	10	29	11	34
44	Japan (JPN)	5	6	14	19	19	25
43	Netherlands (NED)	3	5	13	22	16	27
42	Russia (RUS)		5	23	14	23	19
40	Czech Republic (CZE)	2	2	13	23	15	25
37	Australia (AUS)	9	11	6	11	15	22
34	India (IND)	2	3	14	15	16	18
34	Ukraine (UKR)		6	3	25	3	31
32	Belgium (BEL)	3	3	18	8	21	11
32	Austria (AUT)	1		20	11	21	11
31	Serbia (SRB)	5	1	11	14	16	15
30	Great Britain (GBR)	3	5	7	15	10	20
28	Croatia (CRO)		5	5	18	5	23
26	Poland (POL)	1	2	7	16	8	18
23	Sweden (SWE)	3	7	4	9	7	16
19	Canada (CAN)	6	2	6	5	12	7
19	Switzerland (SUI)	1	2	3	13	4	15
17	Egypt (EGY)	1	1	11	4	12	5
17	China (CHN)	4	7	4	2	8	9
16	Bolivia (BOL)	2	1	5	8	7	9
16	Colombia (COL)			6	10	6	10
16	Romania (ROU)		1	4	11	4	12
15	Chinese Taipei (TPE)		2	8	5	8	7
14	Bosnia and Herzegovina (BIH)	2		7	5	9	5
14	South Korea (KOR)	1		5	8	6	8
14	Turkey (TUR)		1	6	7	6	8
11	Zimbabwe (ZIM)			1	10	1	10
10	Uruguay (URU)		1	7	2	7	3
10	Israel (ISR)			5	5	5	5
10	Hungary (HUN)	2		2	6	4	6
10	Ecuador (ECU)		1	3	6	3	7
10	Chile (CHI)			2	8	2	8
9	South Africa (RSA)			6	3	6	3
9	Kazakhstan (KAZ)	1	1	4	3	5	4
8	Belarus (BLR)	2		2	4	4	4
8	Tunisia (TUN)			1	7	1	7
8	Philippines (PHI)		1		7	0	8
7	Uzbekistan (UZB)	2	1	1	3	3	4
6	Dominican Republic (DOM)		1	4	1	4	2
6	Finland (FIN)	1		1	4	2	4
6	Denmark (DEN)		3	1	2	1	5
6	Thailand (THA)		1	1	4	1	5
6	Venezuela (VEN)		2		4	0	6
6	Mexico (MEX)		1		5	0	6
5	Slovakia (SVK)			4	1	4	1
5	Norway (NOR)		1	2	2	2	3
5	Indonesia (INA)		3		2	0	5
4	Estonia (EST)	1		2	1	3	1
4	Monaco (MON)	1		2	1	3	1
4	Lithuania (LTU)			3	1	3	1
4	Bulgaria (BUL)			2	2	2	2
4	Ireland (IRL)		2		2	0	4
4	Guatemala (GUA)				4	0	4
3	Latvia (LAT)		1		2	0	3
3	Moldova (MDA)		1		2	0	3
3	Morocco (MAR)				3	0	3
3	Peru (PER)				3	0	3
2	New Zealand (NZL)			2		2	0
2	Vietnam (VIE)		1	1		1	1
2	Montenegro (MNE)			1	1	1	1
2	Pakistan (PAK)				2	0	2
1	North Macedonia (MKD)			1		1	0
1	Benin (BEN)				1	0	1
1	Kyrgyzstan (KGZ)				1	0	1
1	Lebanon (LBN)				1	0	1
1	Slovenia (SLO)				1	0	1

== See also ==
- 2017 ATP World Tour
- 2017 ATP Challenger Tour
- 2017 ITF Women's Circuit
