= 2018 Kentucky Bank Tennis Championships =

- Date: 30 July–5 August
- Edition: 23rd (ATP); 21st (ITF)
- Category: ATP Challenger Tour; ITF Women's Circuit
- Prize money: $75,000 (ATP) $60,000 (ITF)
- Surface: Hard
- Location: Lexington, United States

Champions

Men's singles
- (South Africa) Lloyd Harris

Women's singles
- (United States) Asia Muhammad

Men's doubles
- (United States) Robert Galloway / (Venezuela) Roberto Maytín

Women's doubles
- (United States) Hayley Carter / (United States) Ena Shibahara
- Lexington Challenger

The 2018 Kentucky Bank Tennis Championships was a professional tennis tournament played on outdoor hard courts. It was the twenty-third (ATP) and twenty-first (ITF) editions of the tournament and was part of the 2018 ATP Challenger Tour and the 2018 ITF Women's Circuit. It took place in Lexington, United States, on 30 July–5 August 2018.

== Men's singles main draw entrants ==
=== Seeds ===
Country	Player	Rank^{1}	Seed
~~ESP~~	~~Marcel Granollers~~	~~104~~	~~1~~
AUS	Marc Polmans	179	2
SVK	Norbert Gombos	182	3
GBR	Liam Broady	184	4
AUS	Max Purcell	215	5
RSA	Lloyd Harris	216	6
GBR	Jay Clarke	225	7
ITA	Stefano Napolitano	240	8

- ^{1} Rankings as of 23 July 2018.

=== Other entrants ===
The following players received a wildcard into the singles main draw:

- (United States) Collin Altamirano
- (United States) William Bushamuka
- (France) Tom Jomby
- (United States) Sam Riffice

The following players received entry into the singles main draw as alternates:

- (Australia) Andrew Harris
- (Australia) Dayne Kelly

The following players received entry from the qualifying draw:

- (Croatia) Borna Gojo
- (United States) Alex Rybakov
- (Denmark) Mikael Torpegaard
- (United States) J. J. Wolf

The following player received entry as a lucky loser:

- (United States) Ronnie Schneider

== Women's singles main draw entrants ==
=== Seeds ===
Country	Player	Rank^{1}	Seed
NED	Arantxa Rus	105	1
AUS	Arina Rodionova	144	2
AUS	Lizette Cabrera	151	3
CZE	Marie Bouzková	161	4
USA	Grace Min	169	5
GBR	Gabriella Taylor	178	6
ISR	Julia Glushko	196	7
AUS	Jaimee Fourlis	206	8

- ^{1} Rankings as of 23 July 2018.

=== Other entrants ===
The following players received a wildcard into the singles main draw:

- (United States) Jennifer Elie
- (United States) Quinn Gleason
- (United States) Ann Li
- (United States) Peyton Stearns

The following player received entry using a protected ranking:

- (United States) Jessica Pegula

The following player received entry by a special exempt:

- (United States) Gail Brodsky

The following players received entry from the qualifying draw:

- (Australia) Alison Bai
- (United States) Sanaz Marand
- (United States) Anastasia Nefedova
- (United States) Kennedy Shaffer

== Champions ==
=== Men's singles ===
- (South Africa) Lloyd Harris def. (Italy) Stefano Napolitano 6–4, 6–3.

=== Women's singles ===
- (United States) Asia Muhammad def. (United States) Ann Li, 7–5, 6–1

=== Men's doubles ===
- (United States) Robert Galloway / (Venezuela) Roberto Maytín def. (Belgium) Joris De Loore / (Australia) Marc Polmans 6–3, 6–1.

=== Women's doubles ===
- (United States) Hayley Carter / (United States) Ena Shibahara def. (United States) Sanaz Marand / (Mexico) Victoria Rodríguez, 6–3, 6–1
