= 2018 Kentucky Bank Tennis Championships – Men's singles =

Men's singles
- 2018 Kentucky Bank Tennis Championships

Final
- Champion: (South Africa) Lloyd Harris
- Runner-up: (Italy) Stefano Napolitano
- Score: 6–4, 6–3

Events
Singles	men	women
Doubles	men	women
- Kentucky Bank Tennis Championships

Michael Mmoh was the defending champion but chose not to defend his title.

Lloyd Harris won the title after defeating Stefano Napolitano 6–4, 6–3 in the final.

== Seeds ==
1. (Spain) Marcel Granollers (withdrew)
2. (Australia) Marc Polmans (second round)
3. (Slovakia) Norbert Gombos (first round)
4. (United Kingdom) Liam Broady (first round)
5. (Australia) Max Purcell (first round)
6. (South Africa) Lloyd Harris (champion)
7. (United Kingdom) Jay Clarke (quarterfinals, retired)
8. (Italy) Stefano Napolitano (final)

== Draw ==
Key

- Q = Qualifier
- WC = Wild card
- LL = Lucky loser
- Alt = Alternate
- ITF = ITF entry
- PR = Protected ranking
- SR = Special ranking
- SE = Special exempt
- JE = Junior exempt
- JR = Junior Accelerator Programme entrant
- CO = College Accelerator Programme entrant
- NG = Next Gen Accelerator Program entrant
- w/o = Walkover
- r = Retired
- d = Defaulted

=== Finals ===
Semifinals
(South Korea) Chung Yun-seong	5	3
8	(Italy) Stefano Napolitano	7	6
6	(South Africa) Lloyd Harris	6	6
(Belgium) Joris De Loore	1	3

Final
8	(Italy) Stefano Napolitano	4	3
6	(South Africa) Lloyd Harris	6	6

=== Top half ===
First round
Q	(United States) J. J. Wolf	6	7^{7}
(United Kingdom) D Evans	0	6^{5}
(South Korea) Y-s Chung	6	6
WC	(United States) W Bushamuka	2	3
Q	(Denmark) M Torpegaard	6^{0}	6^{4}
Alt	(Australia) A Harris	7^{7}	7^{7}
(Israel) E Leshem	4	4
7	(United Kingdom) J Clarke	6	6
4	(United Kingdom) L Broady	4	6^{4}
Q	(Croatia) B Gojo	6	7^{7}
WC	(France) Tom Jomby	6	7^{7}
(Monaco) L Catarina	2	6^{5}
(United Kingdom) A Ward	6	6
WC	(United States) S Riffice	3	1
Q	(United States) A Rybakov	4	3
8	(Italy) S Napolitano	6	6

Second round
Q	(United States) J. J. Wolf	3	7^{11}	5
(South Korea) Y-s Chung	6	6^{9}	7
Alt	(Australia) A Harris	3	3
7	(United Kingdom) J Clarke	6	6
Q	(Croatia) B Gojo	7	4	7^{8}
WC	(France) T Jomby	5	6	6^{6}
(United Kingdom) A Ward	3	6	3
8	(Italy) S Napolitano	6	2	6

Quarterfinals
(South Korea) Y-s Chung	6	3
7	(United Kingdom) J Clarke	3	0^{r}
Q	(Croatia) B Gojo	4	4
8	(Italy) S Napolitano	6	6

Semifinals
(South Korea) Y-s Chung	5	3
8	(Italy) S Napolitano	7	6

=== Bottom half ===
First round
6	(South Africa) L Harris	6	6
(Japan) Y Uchiyama	4	4
(Japan) K Uchida	6	6
Alt	(Australia) D Kelly	2	4
LL	(United States) R Schneider	6	6
(Netherlands) I Sijsling	2	4
(India) S Myneni	7	7^{7}
3	(Slovakia) N Gombos	5	6^{5}
5	(Australia) M Purcell	1	4
(Brazil) J Menezes	6	6
(France) H Grenier	7^{7}	6^{2}	4
WC	(United States) C Altamirano	6^{4}	7^{7}	6
(Belgium) J De Loore	1	7^{7}	6
(Chile) MT Barrios Vera	6	6^{4}	4
(Italy) A Bega	4	0
2	(Australia) M Polmans	6	6

Second round
6	(South Africa) L Harris	6	6
(Japan) K Uchida	4	4
LL	(United States) R Schneider	5
(India) S Myneni	4^{r}
(Brazil) J Menezes	3	4
WC	(United States) C Altamirano	6	6
(Belgium) J De Loore	1	6	6
2	(Australia) M Polmans	6	3	4

Quarterfinals
6	(South Africa) L Harris	6	6
LL	(United States) R Schneider	3	2
WC	(United States) C Altamirano	6	3	2^{r}
(Belgium) J De Loore	3	6	3

Semifinals
6	(South Africa) L Harris	6	6
(Belgium) J De Loore	1	3
