= 2017 Kentucky Bank Tennis Championships – Men's doubles =

Men's doubles
- 2017 Kentucky Bank Tennis Championships

Final
- Champions: (Australia) Alex Bolt (Australia) Max Purcell
- Runners-up: (France) Tom Jomby (United States) Eric Quigley
- Score: 7–5, 6–4

Events
Singles	men	women
Doubles	men	women
← 2016 ·	Kentucky Bank Tennis Championships	· 2018 →

Luke Saville and Jordan Thompson were the defending champions but only Saville chose to defend his title, partnering Jarryd Chaplin. Saville lost in the quarterfinals to Tom Jomby and Eric Quigley.

Alex Bolt and Max Purcell won the title after defeating Jomby and Quigley 7–5, 6–4 in the final.

== Seeds ==
1. (Australia) John-Patrick Smith / (Australia) Andrew Whittington (quarterfinals)
2. (South Africa) Ruan Roelofse / (Indonesia) Christopher Rungkat (quarterfinals)
3. (United Kingdom) Luke Bambridge / (Republic of Ireland) David O'Hare (semifinals)
4. (Australia) Jarryd Chaplin / (Australia) Luke Saville (quarterfinals)

== Draw ==
=== Key ===
- Q = Qualifier
- WC = Wild card
- LL = Lucky loser
- Alt = Alternate
- SE = Special exempt
- PR = Protected ranking
- ITF = ITF entry
- JE = Junior exempt
- w/o = Walkover
- r = Retired
- d = Defaulted
- SR = Special ranking

First round
(Uruguay) M Felder (United States) K King	3	6	[4]
(Australia) A Bolt (Australia) M Purcell	6	4	[10]
3	(United Kingdom) L Bambridge (Republic of Ireland) D O'Hare	6	6
(United States) JC Aragone (United States) R Galloway	3	4
WC	(United States) Tristan McCormick (United States) Trey Yates	7^{7}	4	[10]
(United States) W Bushamuka (United States) R Sarmiento	6^{3}	6	[8]
WC	(France) Marc-Olivier Baron (United States) J Witten	3	4
PR	(France) Tom Jomby (United States) E Quigley	6	6
(Philippines) R Gonzales (United States) A Lawson	2	4
4	(Australia) Jarryd Chaplin (Australia) L Saville	6	6
WC	(United States) Mi Redlicki (France) Enzo Wallart	4	7^{7}	[3]
(United States) M Giron (New Zealand) J Statham	6	6^{5}	[10]

Quarterfinals
1	(Australia) J-P Smith (Australia) A Whittington	6^{9}	6	[7]
(Australia) A Bolt (Australia) M Purcell	7^{11}	3	[10]
3	(United Kingdom) L Bambridge (Republic of Ireland) D O'Hare	6	6
WC	(United States) T McCormick (United States) T Yates	4	2
PR	(France) T Jomby (United States) E Quigley	6	0	[10]
4	(Australia) J Chaplin (Australia) L Saville	3	6	[4]
(United States) M Giron (New Zealand) J Statham	6	6
2	(South Africa) R Roelofse (Indonesia) C Rungkat	3	3

Semifinals
(Australia) A Bolt (Australia) M Purcell	6	6
3	(United Kingdom) L Bambridge (Republic of Ireland) D O'Hare	2	4
PR	(France) T Jomby (United States) E Quigley	6	1	[10]
(United States) M Giron (New Zealand) J Statham	3	6	[6]

Final
(Australia) A Bolt (Australia) M Purcell	7	6
PR	(France) T Jomby (United States) E Quigley	5	4
