= 2018 Kentucky Bank Tennis Championships – Women's doubles =

Women's doubles
- 2018 Kentucky Bank Tennis Championships

Final
- Champions: (United States) Hayley Carter (United States) Ena Shibahara
- Runners-up: (United States) Sanaz Marand (Mexico) Victoria Rodríguez
- Score: 6–3, 6–1

Events
Singles	men	women
Doubles	men	women
- Lexington Challenger

Priscilla Hon and Vera Lapko were the defending champions, but both players chose not to participate.

Hayley Carter and Ena Shibahara won the title, defeating Sanaz Marand and Victoria Rodríguez in the final, 6–3, 6–1.

== Seeds ==
1. (United States) Asia Muhammad / (Australia) Ellen Perez (quarterfinals)
2. (Australia) Arina Rodionova / (Netherlands) Arantxa Rus (quarterfinals)
3. (Japan) Misaki Doi / (United States) Jessica Pegula (quarterfinals)
4. (United States) Sanaz Marand / (Mexico) Victoria Rodríguez (final)

== Draw ==
Key

- Q = Qualifier
- WC = Wild card
- LL = Lucky loser
- Alt = Alternate
- ITF = ITF entry
- PR = Protected ranking
- SR = Special ranking
- SE = Special exempt
- JE = Junior exempt
- JR = Junior Accelerator Programme entrant
- CO = College Accelerator Programme entrant
- NG = Next Gen Accelerator Program entrant
- w/o = Walkover
- r = Retired
- d = Defaulted

=== Draw ===
First round
1	(United States) A Muhammad (Australia) E Perez	6	6
(United States) Q Gleason (United States) A Parks	2	4
WC	(New Zealand) E Fanning (United States) P Stearns	5	2
(Brazil) L Stefani (Mexico) R Zarazúa	7	6
4	(United States) S Marand (Mexico) V Rodríguez	7	6
(United States) M Kobelt (United States) A Rodgers	5	2
(United States) E Bektas (United Kingdom) K Dunne	2	1
(South Africa) C Simmonds (United Kingdom) E Webley-Smith	6	6
(Australia) K Birrell (Australia) J Fourlis	6^{4}	6	[6]
(Australia) A Bai (United States) A Weinhold	7^{7}	3	[10]
(United States) J Elbaba (Australia) A Sharma	1	7^{7}	[7]
3	(Japan) M Doi (United States) J Pegula	6	6^{5}	[10]
(United States) H Carter (United States) E Shibahara	6	2	[10]
(France) J Ponchet (Papua New Guinea) A Tere-Apisah	3	6	[4]
WC	(United States) A Tkachenko (United States) D Tkachenko	2	2
2	(Australia) Ar Rodionova (Netherlands) A Rus	6	6

Quarterfinals
1	(United States) A Muhammad (Australia) E Perez	6	3	[7]
(Brazil) L Stefani (Mexico) R Zarazúa	2	6	[10]
4	(United States) S Marand (Mexico) V Rodríguez	6	7
(South Africa) C Simmonds (United Kingdom) E Webley-Smith	2	5
(Australia) A Bai (United States) A Weinhold	5	6	[10]
3	(Japan) M Doi (United States) J Pegula	7	4	[8]
(United States) H Carter (United States) E Shibahara	3	6	[10]
2	(Australia) Ar Rodionova (Netherlands) A Rus	6	1	[5]

Semifinals
(Brazil) L Stefani (Mexico) R Zarazúa	5	5
4	(United States) S Marand (Mexico) V Rodríguez	7	7
(Australia) A Bai (United States) A Weinhold	1	1
(United States) H Carter (United States) E Shibahara	6	6

Final
4	(United States) S Marand (Mexico) V Rodríguez	3	1
(United States) H Carter (United States) E Shibahara	6	6
