= 2018 Kentucky Bank Tennis Championships – Women's singles =

Women's singles
- 2018 Kentucky Bank Tennis Championships

Final
- Champion: (United States) Asia Muhammad
- Runner-up: (United States) Ann Li
- Score: 7–5, 6–1

Events
Singles	men	women
Doubles	men	women
- Lexington Challenger

Grace Min was the defending champion, but lost in the first round to Asia Muhammad.

Muhammad went on to win the title, defeating Ann Li in the final, 7–5, 6–1.

== Seeds ==
1. (Netherlands) Arantxa Rus (second round)
2. (Australia) Arina Rodionova (second round)
3. (Australia) Lizette Cabrera (first round)
4. (Czech Republic) Marie Bouzková (quarterfinals)
5. (United States) Grace Min (first round)
6. (United Kingdom) Gabriella Taylor (second round)
7. (Israel) Julia Glushko (second round)
8. (Australia) Jaimee Fourlis (second round)

== Draw ==
Key

- Q = Qualifier
- WC = Wild card
- LL = Lucky loser
- Alt = Alternate
- ITF = ITF entry
- PR = Protected ranking
- SR = Special ranking
- SE = Special exempt
- JE = Junior exempt
- JR = Junior Accelerator Programme entrant
- CO = College Accelerator Programme entrant
- NG = Next Gen Accelerator Program entrant
- w/o = Walkover
- r = Retired
- d = Defaulted

=== Finals ===
Semifinals
WC	(United States) Quinn Gleason	4	4
(United States) Asia Muhammad	6	6
PR	(United States) Jessica Pegula	6	3	4
WC	(United States) Ann Li	2	6	6

Final
(United States) Asia Muhammad	7	6
WC	(United States) Ann Li	5	1

=== Top half ===
First round
1	(Netherlands) A Rus	6	6
(Japan) E Hozumi	4	4
(France) J Ponchet	6	6
(United States) V Duval	4	4
(Papua New Guinea) A Tere-Apisah	3	5
WC	(United States) Q Gleason	6	7
(South Africa) C Simmonds	6	4	4
8	(Australia) J Fourlis	4	6	6
4	(Czech Republic) M Bouzková	3	6	6
Q	(United States) S Marand	6	2	4
(United States) E Bektas	4	4
WC	(United States) J Elie	6	6
Q	(United States) K Shaffer	6	6
SE	(United States) G Brodsky	3	3
(United States) A Muhammad	2	6	6
5	(United States) G Min	6	1	3

Second round
1	(Netherlands) A Rus	3	3
(France) J Ponchet	6	6
WC	(United States) Q Gleason	7	6
8	(Australia) J Fourlis	5	4
4	(Czech Republic) M Bouzková	6	6
WC	(United States) J Elie	0	3
Q	(United States) K Shaffer	1	1
(United States) A Muhammad	6	6

Quarterfinals
(France) J Ponchet	3	6	1
WC	(United States) Q Gleason	6	3	6
4	(Czech Republic) M Bouzková	5	7	3
(United States) A Muhammad	7	5	6

Semifinals
WC	(United States) Q Gleason	4	4
(United States) A Muhammad	6	6

=== Bottom half ===
First round
6	(United Kingdom) G Taylor	6	6
WC	(United States) P Stearns	3	3
PR	(United States) J Pegula	6	1	6
(Japan) M Doi	4	6	2
Q	(Australia) A Bai	1	4
(United Kingdom) K Dunne	6	6
(Australia) A Sharma	6	6
3	(Australia) L Cabrera	2	0
7	(Israel) J Glushko	6	1	7
(Australia) K Birrell	4	6	5
(Mexico) R Zarazúa	4	0
WC	(United States) A Li	6	6
(Mexico) V Rodríguez	2	2
Q	(United States) A Nefedova	6	6
(Australia) E Perez	1	6	2
2	(Australia) Ar Rodionova	6	3	6

Second round
6	(United Kingdom) G Taylor	3	6^{2}
PR	(United States) J Pegula	6	7^{7}
(United Kingdom) K Dunne	7^{7}	6
(Australia) A Sharma	6^{5}	3
7	(Israel) J Glushko	5	6	4
WC	(United States) A Li	7	3	6
Q	(United States) A Nefedova	7^{7}	2	6
2	(Australia) Ar Rodionova	6^{3}	6	3

Quarterfinals
PR	(United States) J Pegula	6	5	7
(United Kingdom) K Dunne	2	7	5
WC	(United States) A Li	6	6
Q	(United States) A Nefedova	2	2

Semifinals
PR	(United States) J Pegula	6	3	4
WC	(United States) A Li	2	6	6
