= 2017 Kentucky Bank Tennis Championships – Women's singles =

Women's singles
- 2017 Kentucky Bank Tennis Championships

Final
- Champion: (United States) Grace Min
- Runner-up: (United States) Sofia Kenin
- Score: 6–4, 6–1

Events
Singles	men	women
Doubles	men	women
- Lexington Challenger

Michaëlla Krajicek was the defending champion, but chose not to participate.

Grace Min won the title, defeating Sofia Kenin in the final, 6–4, 6–1.

== Seeds ==
1. (United States) Danielle Collins (withdrew)
2. (United States) Sofia Kenin (final)
3. (United Kingdom) Laura Robson (second round)
4. (Japan) Eri Hozumi (first round)
5. (France) Chloé Paquet (second round)
6. (United States) Irina Falconi (second round)
7. (United States) Grace Min (champion)
8. (Russia) Ksenia Lykina (first round)

== Draw ==
Key

- Q = Qualifier
- WC = Wild card
- LL = Lucky loser
- Alt = Alternate
- ITF = ITF entry
- PR = Protected ranking
- SR = Special ranking
- SE = Special exempt
- JE = Junior exempt
- JR = Junior Accelerator Programme entrant
- CO = College Accelerator Programme entrant
- NG = Next Gen Accelerator Program entrant
- w/o = Walkover
- r = Retired
- d = Defaulted

=== Finals ===
Semifinals
(Belarus) Vera Lapko	4	6	6^{2}
7	(United States) Grace Min	6	3	7^{7}
WC	(United States) Emina Bektas	5	3
2	(United States) Sofia Kenin	7	6

Final
7	(United States) Grace Min	6	6
2	(United States) Sofia Kenin	4	1

=== Top half ===
First round
Q	(New Zealand) E Routliffe	6	6
WC	(United States) T Rogers	0	1
(Belarus) V Lapko	6	2	6
(United States) J Elie	3	6	3
(United Kingdom) K Boulter	5	3
WC	(United States) A Kiick	7	6
Q	(Latvia) D Vismane	4	1
5	(France) C Paquet	6	6
3	(United Kingdom) L Robson	1	6	7
(United States) F Di Lorenzo	6	4	5
(France) T Andrianjafitrimo	6	6
LL	(United States) C Van Nguyen	4	0
Q	(Colombia) C Osorio	6	4	3
(United States) J Elbaba	3	6	6
(Russia) V Savinykh	2	2
7	(United States) G Min	6	6

Second round
Q	(New Zealand) E Routliffe	4	1
(Belarus) V Lapko	6	6
WC	(United States) A Kiick	6	7
5	(France) C Paquet	4	5
3	(United Kingdom) L Robson	5	1
(France) T Andrianjafitrimo	7	6
(United States) J Elbaba	5	1
7	(United States) G Min	7	6

Quarterfinals
(Belarus) V Lapko	6	6
WC	(United States) A Kiick	1	4
(France) T Andrianjafitrimo	6^{0}	4
7	(United States) G Min	7^{7}	6

Semifinals
(Belarus) V Lapko	4	6	6^{2}
7	(United States) G Min	6	3	7^{7}

=== Bottom half ===
First round
8	(Russia) K Lykina	3	4
(United States) A Anisimova	6	6
(Australia) P Hon	3	1
(Japan) H Kuwata	6	6
(France) S Reix	6^{5}	4
WC	(United States) E Bektas	7^{7}	6
(United Kingdom) K Dunne	6	7
4	(Japan) E Hozumi	2	5
6	(United States) I Falconi	6	6
(United States) R Yurovsky	0	3
(United States) R Anderson	2	6	6
(Papua New Guinea) A Tere-Apisah	6	2	0
(Australia) O Tjandramulia	5	4
WC	(United States) A Tatishvili	7	6
Q	(United States) A Nefedova	2	0
2	(United States) S Kenin	6	6

Second round
(United States) A Anisimova	6	6
(Japan) H Kuwata	0	1
WC	(United States) E Bektas	6	6
(United Kingdom) K Dunne	1	4
6	(United States) I Falconi	7^{7}	2	2
(United States) R Anderson	6^{0}	6	6
WC	(United States) A Tatishvili	4	2
2	(United States) S Kenin	6	6

Quarterfinals
(United States) A Anisimova	4	2
WC	(United States) E Bektas	6	6
(United States) R Anderson	7^{7}	0	1
2	(United States) S Kenin	6^{2}	6	6

Semifinals
WC	(United States) E Bektas	5	3
2	(United States) S Kenin	7	6
