= 2017 Kentucky Bank Tennis Championships – Women's doubles =

Women's doubles
- 2017 Kentucky Bank Tennis Championships

Final
- Champion: (Australia) Priscilla Hon (Belarus) Vera Lapko
- Runner-up: (Japan) Hiroko Kuwata (Russia) Valeria Savinykh
- Score: 6–3, 6–4

Events
Singles	men	women
Doubles	men	women
- Lexington Challenger

Hiroko Kuwata and Zhu Lin were the defending champions, but Zhu chose not to participate. Kuwata played alongside Valeria Savinykh as the top seeds, but they lost in the final to the second seeds Priscilla Hon and Valeria Savinykh in the final, 6–3, 6–4.

== Seeds ==
1. (Japan) Hiroko Kuwata / (Russia) Valeria Savinykh (final)
2. (Australia) Priscilla Hon / (Belarus) Vera Lapko (champions)
3. (Russia) Ksenia Lykina / (United Kingdom) Emily Webley-Smith (first round)
4. (France) Chloé Paquet / (France) Shérazad Reix (first round)

== Draw ==
Key

- Q = Qualifier
- WC = Wild card
- LL = Lucky loser
- Alt = Alternate
- ITF = ITF entry
- PR = Protected ranking
- SR = Special ranking
- SE = Special exempt
- JE = Junior exempt
- JR = Junior Accelerator Programme entrant
- CO = College Accelerator Programme entrant
- NG = Next Gen Accelerator Program entrant
- w/o = Walkover
- r = Retired
- d = Defaulted

First round
1	(Japan) H Kuwata (Russia) V Savinykh	2	6	[13]
(New Zealand) PM Hourigan (New Zealand) E Routliffe	6	4	[11]
(United States) J Elbaba (United States) M Kobelt	6	6
(Japan) H Sasano (United States) S Schenck	2	2
4	(France) C Paquet (France) S Reix	3	6	[9]
(Ukraine) A Bondarenko (United States) A Tatishvili	6	0	[11]
(Japan) M Adachi (United States) S Daavettila	3	6	[12]
(France) T Andrianjafitrimo (United States) J Elie	6	3	[14]
(United States) E Bektas (United States) F Di Lorenzo	6	6
(Papua New Guinea) A Tere-Apisah (United States) J Wacnik	4	3
(Australia) O Tjandramulia (United States) R Yurovsky	6	3	[10]
3	(Russia) K Lykina (United Kingdom) E Webley-Smith	3	6	[7]
(United States) B Boren (Mexico) S León	1	4
(United States) A Kiick (United States) C Van Nguyen	6	6
WC	(United States) A Baranovski (United States) S Bouchard	1	0
2	(Australia) P Hon (Belarus) V Lapko	6	6

Quarterfinals
1	(Japan) H Kuwata (Russia) V Savinykh	6	6
(United States) J Elbaba (United States) M Kobelt	3	1
(Ukraine) A Bondarenko (United States) A Tatishvili	3	4
(France) T Andrianjafitrimo (United States) J Elie	6	6
(United States) E Bektas (United States) F Di Lorenzo	6	6
(Australia) O Tjandramulia (United States) R Yurovsky	3	2
(United States) A Kiick (United States) C Van Nguyen	0	4
2	(Australia) P Hon (Belarus) V Lapko	6	6

Semifinals
1	(Japan) H Kuwata (Russia) V Savinykh	6	6
(France) T Andrianjafitrimo (United States) J Elie	4	3
(United States) E Bektas (United States) F Di Lorenzo	6^{1}	4
2	(Australia) P Hon (Belarus) V Lapko	7^{7}	6

Final
1	(Japan) H Kuwata (Russia) V Savinykh	3	4
2	(Australia) P Hon (Belarus) V Lapko	6	6
