= 2017 ITF Women's Circuit =

Tennis circuit

Details
- Duration: 2 January – 31 December 2017
- Edition: 24th
- Tournaments: 539
- Categories: $100,000 tournaments (19) $80,000 tournaments (9) $60,000 tournaments (40) $25,000 tournaments (154) $15,000 tournaments (317)

Achievements (singles)
- Most titles: (Romania) Mihaela Buzărnescu (7)
- Most finals: (Chile) Fernanda Brito (10)

The 2017 International Tennis Federation (ITF) Women's Circuit is a second-tier tour for women's professional tennis. It is organized by the International Tennis Federation and is a tier below the Women's Tennis Association (WTA) Tour. The ITF Women's Circuit includes tournaments with prize money ranging from $15,000 to $100,000.

== Participating host nations ==
- Argentina (ARG)
- Australia (AUS)
- Austria (AUT)
- Belarus (BLR)
- Belgium (BEL)
- Bolivia (BOL)
- Bosnia and Herzegovina (BIH)
- Brazil (BRA)
- Bulgaria (BUL)
- Canada (CAN)
- Chile (CHI)
- China (CHN)
- Chinese Taipei (TPE)
- Colombia (COL)
- Croatia (CRO)
- Czech Republic (CZE)
- Ecuador (ECU)
- Egypt (EGY)
- Estonia (EST)
- Finland (FIN)
- France (FRA)
- Georgia (GEO)
- Germany (GER)
- Great Britain (GBR)
- Greece (GRE)
- Hong Kong (HKG)
- Hungary (HUN)
- India (IND)
- Ireland (IRL)
- Israel (ISR)
- Italy (ITA)
- Japan (JPN)
- Kazakhstan (KAZ)
- Lebanon (LBN)
- Liechtenstein (LIE)
- Luxembourg (LUX)
- Mexico (MEX)
- Montenegro (MNE)
- Morocco (MAR)
- Netherlands (NED)
- Nigeria (NGR)
- Norway (NOR)
- Paraguay (PAR)
- Poland (POL)
- Portugal (POR)
- Romania (ROU)
- Russia (RUS)
- Senegal (SEN)
- Serbia (SRB)
- Slovakia (SVK)
- Slovenia (SLO)
- South Africa (RSA)
- South Korea (KOR)
- Spain (ESP)
- Sri Lanka (SRI)
- Sweden (SWE)
- Switzerland (SUI)
- Thailand (THA)
- Tunisia (TUN)
- Turkey (TUR)
- Ukraine (UKR)
- United Arab Emirates (UAE)
- United States (USA)
- Uzbekistan (UZB)

== Tournament breakdown by event category ==
Event category	Number of events	Total prize money
$100,000	19	$1,900,000
$80,000	9	$720,000
$60,000	40	$2,400,000
$25,000	154	$3,850,000
$15,000	317	$4,755,000
Total	539	$13,625,000

== Ranking points distribution ==
Category	W	F	SF	QF	R16	R32	Q	Q3	Q2	Q1
ITF $100,000+H (S)	150	90	55	28	14	1	6	4	1	–
ITF $100,000+H (D)	150	90	55	28	1	–	–	–	–	–
ITF $100,000 (S)	140	85	50	25	13	1	6	4	1	–
ITF $100,000 (D)	140	85	50	25	1	–	–	–	–	–
ITF $80,000+H (S)	130	80	48	24	12	1	5	3	1	–
ITF $80,000+H (D)	130	80	48	24	1	–	–	–	–	–
ITF $80,000 (S)	115	70	42	21	10	1	5	3	1	–
ITF $80,000 (D)	115	70	42	21	1	–	–	–	–	–
ITF $60,000+H (S)	100	60	36	18	9	1	5	3	1	–
ITF $60,000+H (D)	100	60	36	18	1	–	–	–	–	–
ITF $60,000 (S)	80	48	29	15	8	1	5	3	1	–
ITF $60,000 (D)	80	48	29	15	1	–	–	–	–	–
ITF $25,000+H (S)	60	36	22	11	6	1	2	–	–	–
ITF $25,000+H (D)	60	36	22	11	1	–	–	–	–	–
ITF $25,000 (S)	50	30	18	9	5	1	1	–	–	–
ITF $25,000 (D)	50	30	18	9	1	–	–	–	–	–
ITF $15,000+H (S)	25	15	9	5	1	–	–	–	–	–
ITF $15,000+H (D)	25	15	9	1	0	–	–	–	–	–
ITF $15,000 (S)	12	7	4	2	1	–	–	–	–	–
ITF $15,000 (D)	12	7	4	1	0	–	–	–	–	–

- "+H" indicates that hospitality is provided.

== Retired players ==
Player	Born	Highest Ranking		ITF Titles	
Player	Born	Singles	Doubles	Singles	Doubles
(Bosnia and Herzegovina) Ema Burgić Bucko	22 August 1992	466	145	3	11
(Australia) Emily Hewson	31 July 1982	314	204	2	4
(Slovakia) Stanislava Hrozenská	17 June 1982	146	151	3	11
(Georgia (country)) Sofia Kvatsabaia	18 July 1988	362	257	10	19
(Belgium) Klaartje Liebens	11 January 1995	295	743	5	0
(Croatia) Jelena Pandžić	17 March 1983	136	226	11	5
(Madagascar) Nantenaina Ramalalaharivololona	10 July 1987	-	916	0	1
(Canada) Ekaterina Shulaeva	30 May 1987	253	339	0	1
(United Kingdom) Lisa Whybourn	11 May 1991	250	386	0	7

== Statistics ==
These tables present the number of singles (S) and doubles (D) titles won by each player and each nation during the season. The players/nations are sorted by: 1) total number of titles (a doubles title won by two players representing the same nation counts as only one win for the nation); 2) a singles > doubles hierarchy; 3) alphabetical order (by family names for players).

To avoid confusion and double counting, these tables should be updated only after an event is completed.

=== Key ===
Category
$100,000 tournaments
$80,000 tournaments
$60,000 tournaments
$25,000 tournaments
$15,000 tournaments

=== Titles won by player ===
Updated as of December 31

Total	Player	$100K		$80K		$60K		$25K		$15K		Total	
Total	Player	S	D	S	D	S	D	S	D	S	D	S	D
13	Polina Monova (RUS)						1	3	4	2	3	5	8
11	Fernanda Brito (CHI)									5	6	5	6
11	Olga Doroshina (RUS)								6	2	3	2	9
10	Mihaela Buzărnescu (ROU)	1	1	1	1	4		1	1			7	3
10	Maryna Chernyshova (UKR)									5	5	5	5
9	María Teresa Torró Flor (ESP)							2	1	3	3	5	4
9	Andrea Gámiz (VEN)							1	5	2	1	3	6
9	Giuliana Olmos (MEX)						2		4	1	2	1	8
9	Laura-Ioana Andrei (ROU)								4	1	4	1	8
8	Despina Papamichail (GRE)									6	2	6	2
8	Georgina García Pérez (ESP)							3	4	1		4	4
8	María Fernanda Herazo (COL)									4	4	4	4
8	Chiara Scholl (USA)							2	2	1	3	3	5
8	Georgia Crăciun (ROU)									3	5	3	5
8	Vera Lapko (BLR)						2	2	4			2	6
8	Emina Bektas (USA)			1			2		4		1	1	7
8	Gabriela Cé (BRA)						1		2	1	4	1	7
8	Yana Sizikova (RUS)								6		2	0	8
8	Ilona Kremen (BLR)								1		7	0	8
7	Chantal Škamlová (SVK)						1	1	1	1	3	2	5
7	Petra Krejsová (CZE)								3	2	2	2	5
7	Julia Wachaczyk (GER)						1		2	1	3	1	6
7	Luisa Stefani (BRA)								4		3	0	7
7	Jasmina Tinjić (BIH)								2		5	0	7
6	Polona Hercog (SLO)					2		4				6	0
6	Cristina Dinu (ROU)								1	4	1	4	2
6	Ekaterine Gorgodze (GEO)									4	2	4	2
6	Taylor Townsend (USA)			1	1			2	2			3	3
6	Victoria Kan (RUS)									3	3	3	3
6	Gaia Sanesi (ITA)									3	3	3	3
6	Carol Zhao (CAN)	1					2	1			2	2	4
6	Irina Bara (ROU)				1		1	2	2			2	4
6	Valeria Savinykh (RUS)					1			3	1	1	2	4
6	Ilona Georgiana Ghioroaie (ROU)									2	4	2	4
6	Magali Kempen (BEL)									2	4	2	4
6	Lisa Sabino (SUI)									2	4	2	4
6	Valentyna Ivakhnenko (RUS)						1	1	3		1	1	5
6	Sanaz Marand (USA)						1		2	1	2	1	5
6	Naiktha Bains (AUS)								3	1	2	1	5
6	Federica Di Sarra (ITA)									1	5	1	5
6	Dia Evtimova (BUL)									1	5	1	5
6	Camila Giangreco Campiz (PAR)									1	5	1	5
6	Alexa Guarachi (CHI)						2		2		2	0	6
6	Camilla Rosatello (ITA)						1		4		1	0	6
6	Diāna Marcinkēviča (LAT)						1		2		3	0	6
6	Giorgia Marchetti (ITA)										6	0	6
6	Angelica Moratelli (ITA)										6	0	6
6	Wu Fang-hsien (TPE)										6	0	6
5	Isabelle Wallace (AUS)							2		3		5	0
5	Nuria Párrizas Díaz (ESP)									5		5	0
5	Markéta Vondroušová (CZE)	1		1				1		1	1	4	1
5	Marta Leśniak (POL)									4	1	4	1
5	Deborah Chiesa (ITA)							3	2			3	2
5	Miriam Kolodziejová (CZE)									3	2	3	2
5	Lee Pei-chi (TPE)									3	2	3	2
5	Iryna Shymanovich (BLR)									3	2	3	2
5	Panna Udvardy (HUN)									3	2	3	2
5	Daniela Seguel (CHI)					1	2	1	1			2	3
5	Ayano Shimizu (JPN)							2	3			2	3
5	Martina Colmegna (ITA)								2	2	1	2	3
5	Raluca Georgiana Șerban (ROU)								2	2	1	2	3
5	Chanel Simmonds (RSA)								1	2	2	2	3
5	Rutuja Bhosale (IND)									2	3	2	3
5	Maia Lumsden (GBR)									2	3	2	3
5	Oana Georgeta Simion (ROU)									2	3	2	3
5	Quinn Gleason (USA)				1				1	1	2	1	4
5	Lidziya Marozava (BLR)						1	1	3			1	4
5	Anastasia Grymalska (ITA)								2	1	2	1	4
5	Tereza Mihalíková (SVK)								1	1	3	1	4
5	Tayisiya Morderger (GER)									1	4	1	4
5	Yana Morderger (GER)									1	4	1	4
5	Thaisa Grana Pedretti (BRA)									1	4	1	4
5	Pranjala Yadlapalli (IND)									1	4	1	4
5	Anastasiya Komardina (RUS)		1		1		1		2			0	5
5	Priscilla Hon (AUS)						2		3			0	5
5	Jiang Xinyu (CHN)						1		3		1	0	5
5	Desirae Krawczyk (USA)						1		2		2	0	5
5	Ana Veselinović (MNE)								3		2	0	5
5	Varunya Wongteanchai (THA)								1		4	0	5
5	Chen Pei-hsuan (TPE)										5	0	5
4	Magdaléna Rybáriková (SVK)	2		1		1						4	0
4	Dejana Radanović (SRB)							1		3		4	0
4	Anhelina Kalinina (UKR)							3	1			3	1
4	Gao Xinyu (CHN)							2	1	1		3	1
4	Jacqueline Cabaj Awad (SWE)									3	1	3	1
4	Nathaly Kurata (BRA)									3	1	3	1
4	Sandra Samir (EGY)									3	1	3	1
4	Caroline Dolehide (USA)		1					2	1			2	2
4	Bernarda Pera (USA)			1				1	2			2	2
4	Katharina Gerlach (GER)						1			2	1	2	2
4	Jaqueline Cristian (ROU)							2	2			2	2
4	Luksika Kumkhum (THA)							2	2			2	2
4	Lu Jiajing (CHN)							1	2	1		2	2
4	Elena-Gabriela Ruse (ROU)							1	2	1		2	2
4	Olga Sáez Larra (ESP)							1	1	1	1	2	2
4	Manon Arcangioli (FRA)								2	2		2	2
4	Oana Gavrilă (ROU)									2	2	2	2
4	Hélène Scholsen (BEL)									2	2	2	2
4	Jelena Simić (BIH)									2	2	2	2
4	Michele Alexandra Zmău (ITA)									2	2	2	2
4	Dayana Yastremska (UKR)				1	1			2			1	3
4	Sabrina Santamaria (USA)				1				1	1	1	1	3
4	Anna Zaja (GER)						1		2	1		1	3
4	Bibiane Schoofs (NED)							1	3			1	3
4	Akiko Omae (JPN)							1	2		1	1	3
4	Cornelia Lister (SWE)								3	1		1	3
4	Choi Ji-hee (KOR)								1	1	2	1	3
4	Hsu Chieh-yu (TPE)								1	1	2	1	3
4	Fanny Östlund (SWE)								1	1	2	1	3
4	Lisa Ponomar (GER)								1	1	2	1	3
4	Anna Bondár (HUN)									1	3	1	3
4	Berfu Cengiz (TUR)									1	3	1	3
4	Mia Eklund (FIN)									1	3	1	3
4	Bárbara Gatica (CHI)									1	3	1	3
4	Réka Luca Jani (HUN)									1	3	1	3
4	İpek Öz (TUR)									1	3	1	3
4	Sun Xuliu (CHN)									1	3	1	3
4	Veronika Kudermetova (RUS)		3				1					0	4
4	Han Xinyun (CHN)		1				3					0	4
4	An-Sophie Mestach (BEL)		1				2		1			0	4
4	Rika Fujiwara (JPN)		1						3			0	4
4	Junri Namigata (JPN)						2		2			0	4
4	Kotomi Takahata (JPN)						2		1		1	0	4
4	Ankita Raina (IND)						1		3			0	4
4	Tang Qianhui (CHN)						1		3			0	4
4	Abigail Tere-Apisah (PNG)								4			0	4
4	Renata Zarazúa (MEX)								4			0	4
4	Claudia Giovine (ITA)								3		1	0	4
4	Momoko Kobori (JPN)								3		1	0	4
4	Ksenia Palkina (KGZ)								1		3	0	4
4	Emily Appleton (GBR)										4	0	4
4	Emilie Francati (DEN)										4	0	4
4	Rosalie van der Hoek (NED)										4	0	4
4	Kanika Vaidya (IND)										4	0	4
3	Anna Karolína Schmiedlová (SVK)			1				2				3	0
3	Olivia Rogowska (AUS)					1		2				3	0
3	Ulrikke Eikeri (NOR)							2		1		3	0
3	Kaia Kanepi (EST)							2		1		3	0
3	Haruka Kaji (JPN)							1		2		3	0
3	Katie Swan (GBR)							1		2		3	0
3	Clothilde de Bernardi (FRA)									3		3	0
3	Jeong Su-nam (KOR)									3		3	0
3	Lisa Matviyenko (GER)									3		3	0
3	Sarah-Rebecca Sekulic (GER)									3		3	0
3	Belinda Bencic (SUI)	2	1									2	1
3	Beatriz Haddad Maia (BRA)	1						1	1			2	1
3	Magdalena Fręch (POL)		1					2				2	1
3	Kristie Ahn (USA)			1	1	1						2	1
3	Ysaline Bonaventure (BEL)					1			1	1		2	1
3	Cristiana Ferrando (ITA)					1			1	1		2	1
3	Bianca Andreescu (CAN)						1	2				2	1
3	Irina Khromacheva (RUS)							2	1			2	1
3	Viktória Kužmová (SVK)							2	1			2	1
3	Peangtarn Plipuech (THA)							2	1			2	1
3	Mayo Hibi (JPN)							1		1	1	2	1
3	Audrey Albié (FRA)									2	1	2	1
3	Monika Kilnarová (CZE)									2	1	2	1
3	Eleni Kordolaimi (GRE)									2	1	2	1
3	Daria Lodikova (RUS)									2	1	2	1
3	Marine Partaud (FRA)									2	1	2	1
3	Sviatlana Pirazhenka (BLR)									2	1	2	1
3	Nina Potočnik (SLO)									2	1	2	1
3	Andreea Amalia Roșca (ROU)									2	1	2	1
3	Sofia Kenin (USA)				1	1	1					1	2
3	Eri Hozumi (JPN)				1			1	1			1	2
3	Conny Perrin (SUI)				1			1	1			1	2
3	Anastasia Potapova (RUS)				1			1	1			1	2
3	Başak Eraydın (TUR)					1					2	1	2
3	Jovana Jakšić (SRB)						1	1	1			1	2
3	Catalina Pella (ARG)						1		1	1		1	2
3	Sofia Shapatava (GEO)						1			1	1	1	2
3	Lina Gjorcheska (MKD)							1	2			1	2
3	Miharu Imanishi (JPN)							1	2			1	2
3	Shérazad Reix (FRA)							1	2			1	2
3	Katharina Hobgarski (GER)							1	1		1	1	2
3	Estrella Cabeza Candela (ESP)								2	1		1	2
3	Paula Cristina Gonçalves (BRA)								2	1		1	2
3	Anastasia Pivovarova (RUS)								2	1		1	2
3	Samantha Murray (GBR)								1	1	1	1	2
3	Mariam Bolkvadze (GEO)									1	2	1	2
3	Irene Burillo Escorihuela (ESP)									1	2	1	2
3	Jodie Anna Burrage (GBR)									1	2	1	2
3	Chayenne Ewijk (NED)									1	2	1	2
3	Guo Shanshan (CHN)									1	2	1	2
3	Daria Kruzkhova (RUS)									1	2	1	2
3	Julia Terziyska (BUL)									1	2	1	2
3	Ecaterina Visnevscaia (RUS)									1	2	1	2
3	Nina Stojanović (SRB)		1				2					0	3
3	Kaitlyn Christian (USA)				1		1		1			0	3
3	Julia Glushko (ISR)						1		2			0	3
3	Ellen Perez (AUS)						1		2			0	3
3	Riko Sawayanagi (JPN)						1		2			0	3
3	Hiroko Kuwata (JPN)								3			0	3
3	Kyōka Okamura (JPN)								3			0	3
3	Olesya Pervushina (RUS)								3			0	3
3	Ayla Aksu (TUR)								2		1	0	3
3	Valeriya Strakhova (UKR)								2		1	0	3
3	Kimberley Zimmermann (BEL)								2		1	0	3
3	Freya Christie (GBR)								1		2	0	3
3	Anastasia Frolova (RUS)								1		2	0	3
3	Kang Seo-kyung (KOR)								1		2	0	3
3	Kim Na-ri (KOR)								1		2	0	3
3	Ayaka Okuno (JPN)								1		2	0	3
3	Jessy Rompies (INA)								1		2	0	3
3	Mana Ayukawa (JPN)										3	0	3
3	Michaela Boev (BEL)										3	0	3
3	Yvonne Cavallé Reimers (ESP)										3	0	3
3	Mariana Dražić (CRO)										3	0	3
3	Lara Escauriza (PAR)										3	0	3
3	Samantha Harris (AUS)										3	0	3
3	Jana Jablonovská (SVK)										3	0	3
3	Veronika Kapshay (UKR)										3	0	3
3	Albina Khabibulina (UZB)										3	0	3
3	Nastja Kolar (SLO)										3	0	3
3	Nudnida Luangnam (THA)										3	0	3
3	Inês Murta (POR)										3	0	3
3	Olga Parres Azcoitia (ESP)										3	0	3
3	Natasha Piludu (ITA)										3	0	3
3	María José Portillo Ramírez (MEX)										3	0	3
3	Melis Sezer (TUR)										3	0	3
3	Alina Silich (RUS)										3	0	3
3	Belinda Woolcock (AUS)										3	0	3
3	Noelia Zeballos (BOL)										3	0	3
3	Maria Zotova (RUS)										3	0	3
2	Tatjana Maria (GER)	2										2	0
2	Zhang Shuai (CHN)	2										2	0
2	Zheng Saisai (CHN)	1				1						2	0
2	Zarina Diyas (KAZ)	1						1				2	0
2	Jasmine Paolini (ITA)	1						1				2	0
2	Ekaterina Alexandrova (RUS)					2						2	0
2	Madison Brengle (USA)					2						2	0
2	Richèl Hogenkamp (NED)					2						2	0
2	Wang Yafan (CHN)					1		1				2	0
2	Sofya Zhuk (RUS)					1		1				2	0
2	Tamara Zidanšek (SLO)					1		1				2	0
2	Destanee Aiava (AUS)							2				2	0
2	Georgia Brescia (ITA)							2				2	0
2	Danielle Collins (USA)							2				2	0
2	Vitalia Diatchenko (RUS)							2				2	0
2	Alexandra Dulgheru (ROU)							2				2	0
2	Myrtille Georges (FRA)							2				2	0
2	Deniz Khazaniuk (ISR)							2				2	0
2	Claire Liu (USA)							2				2	0
2	Arantxa Rus (NED)							2				2	0
2	Patty Schnyder (SUI)							2				2	0
2	Gabriella Taylor (GBR)							2				2	0
2	Viktoriya Tomova (BUL)							2				2	0
2	Aleksandra Wozniak (CAN)							2				2	0
2	Marie Bouzková (CZE)							1		1		2	0
2	Julia Grabher (AUT)							1		1		2	0
2	Olga Ianchuk (UKR)							1		1		2	0
2	Marta Paigina (RUS)							1		1		2	0
2	Zhang Ling (HKG)							1		1		2	0
2	Michaela Bayerlová (CZE)									2		2	0
2	Patcharin Cheapchandej (THA)									2		2	0
2	Nicoleta Dascălu (ROU)									2		2	0
2	Michaela Haet (AUS)									2		2	0
2	Lee Hua-chen (TPE)									2		2	0
2	Seone Mendez (AUS)									2		2	0
2	Pemra Özgen (TUR)									2		2	0
2	Alice Ramé (FRA)									2		2	0
2	Stefania Rubini (ITA)									2		2	0
2	Ana Sofía Sánchez (MEX)									2		2	0
2	Camilla Scala (ITA)									2		2	0
2	Astra Sharma (AUS)									2		2	0
2	Iga Świątek (POL)									2		2	0
2	Asia Muhammad (USA)					1	1					1	1
2	Laura Robson (GBR)					1	1					1	1
2	Ksenia Lykina (RUS)						1	1				1	1
2	Tammi Patterson (AUS)						1	1				1	1
2	Katy Dunne (GBR)						1			1		1	1
2	Montserrat González (PAR)						1			1		1	1
2	Anastasiya Vasylyeva (UKR)						1			1		1	1
2	Nigina Abduraimova (UZB)							1	1			1	1
2	Robin Anderson (USA)							1	1			1	1
2	Valentini Grammatikopoulou (GRE)							1	1			1	1
2	Han Na-lae (KOR)							1	1			1	1
2	Anna Kalinskaya (RUS)							1	1			1	1
2	Alisa Kleybanova (RUS)							1	1			1	1
2	Lee Ya-hsuan (TPE)							1	1			1	1
2	Lu Jingjing (CHN)							1	1			1	1
2	Sabina Sharipova (UZB)							1	1			1	1
2	Tereza Smitková (CZE)							1	1			1	1
2	Melanie Stokke (NOR)							1			1	1	1
2	Cristina Bucșa (ESP)								1	1		1	1
2	Tena Lukas (CRO)								1	1		1	1
2	Emily Webley-Smith (GBR)								1	1		1	1
2	Xun Fangying (CHN)								1	1		1	1
2	Fatma Al-Nabhani (OMA)									1	1	1	1
2	Emily Arbuthnott (GBR)									1	1	1	1
2	Susan Bandecchi (SUI)									1	1	1	1
2	Mirjam Björklund (SWE)									1	1	1	1
2	Lea Bošković (CRO)									1	1	1	1
2	Sara Cakarevic (FRA)									1	1	1	1
2	Martina Caregaro (ITA)									1	1	1	1
2	María Lourdes Carlé (ARG)									1	1	1	1
2	Estelle Cascino (FRA)									1	1	1	1
2	Zeel Desai (IND)									1	1	1	1
2	Vlada Ekshibarova (ISR)									1	1	1	1
2	Eva Guerrero Álvarez (ESP)									1	1	1	1
2	Dea Herdželaš (BIH)									1	1	1	1
2	Michaela Hončová (SVK)									1	1	1	1
2	Inès Ibbou (ALG)									1	1	1	1
2	Sandra Jamrichová (SVK)									1	1	1	1
2	Vivien Juhászová (SVK)									1	1	1	1
2	Karin Kennel (SUI)									1	1	1	1
2	Kamila Kerimbayeva (KAZ)									1	1	1	1
2	Natalija Kostić (SRB)									1	1	1	1
2	Leonie Küng (SUI)									1	1	1	1
2	Ma Yexin (CHN)									1	1	1	1
2	Aleksandra Pospelova (RUS)									1	1	1	1
2	Isabella Shinikova (BUL)									1	1	1	1
2	Lucrezia Stefanini (ITA)									1	1	1	1
2	Gabriela Talabă (ROU)									1	1	1	1
2	Anna Blinkova (RUS)		2									0	2
2	Natela Dzalamidze (RUS)		2									0	2
2	María Irigoyen (ARG)		2									0	2
2	Monique Adamczak (AUS)		1				1					0	2
2	Jacqueline Cako (USA)		1				1					0	2
2	Chang Kai-chen (TPE)		1				1					0	2
2	Ye Qiuyu (CHN)		1				1					0	2
2	Mariana Duque Mariño (COL)		1						1			0	2
2	Elitsa Kostova (BUL)		1						1			0	2
2	Alla Kudryavtseva (RUS)		1						1			0	2
2	Storm Sanders (AUS)		1						1			0	2
2	Caitlin Whoriskey (USA)		1						1			0	2
2	Alena Fomina (RUS)		1								1	0	2
2	Jocelyn Rae (GBR)		1								1	0	2
2	Miyu Kato (JPN)				1				1			0	2
2	Jessica Pegula (USA)				1				1			0	2
2	Alison Bai (AUS)						1		1			0	2
2	Lesley Kerkhove (NED)						1		1			0	2
2	Nadia Podoroska (ARG)						1		1			0	2
2	İpek Soylu (TUR)						1		1			0	2
2	Guadalupe Pérez Rojas (ARG)						1				1	0	2
2	Sophie Chang (USA)								2			0	2
2	Tamaryn Hendler (BEL)								2			0	2
2	Jesika Malečková (CZE)								2			0	2
2	Alice Matteucci (ITA)								2			0	2
2	Tereza Mrdeža (CRO)								2			0	2
2	Aleksandrina Naydenova (BUL)								2			0	2
2	Amra Sadiković (SUI)								2			0	2
2	Eva Wacanno (NED)								2			0	2
2	Anastasia Zarycká (CZE)								2			0	2
2	Elena Bogdan (ROU)								1		1	0	2
2	Chan Chin-wei (TPE)								1		1	0	2
2	Sarah Beth Grey (GBR)								1		1	0	2
2	Vivian Heisen (GER)								1		1	0	2
2	Hong Seung-yeon (KOR)								1		1	0	2
2	Miyabi Inoue (JPN)								1		1	0	2
2	Madeleine Kobelt (USA)								1		1	0	2
2	Anna Morgina (RUS)								1		1	0	2
2	Nina Stadler (SUI)								1		1	0	2
2	Kateřina Vaňková (CZE)								1		1	0	2
2	Ola Abou Zekry (EGY)										2	0	2
2	Mira Antonitsch (AUT)										2	0	2
2	Victoria Bosio (ARG)										2	0	2
2	Alba Carrillo Marín (ESP)										2	0	2
2	Tamara Čurović (SRB)										2	0	2
2	Dagmar Dudláková (CZE)										2	0	2
2	Beatrice Gumulya (INA)										2	0	2
2	Hsu Ching-wen (TPE)										2	0	2
2	Akari Inoue (JPN)										2	0	2
2	Dasha Ivanova (USA)										2	0	2
2	Naïma Karamoko (SUI)										2	0	2
2	Ekaterina Kazionova (RUS)										2	0	2
2	Déborah Kerfs (BEL)										2	0	2
2	Rio Kitagawa (JPN)										2	0	2
2	Maryna Kolb (UKR)										2	0	2
2	Nadiya Kolb (UKR)										2	0	2
2	Emma Laine (FIN)										2	0	2
2	Li Yihong (CHN)										2	0	2
2	Yasmine Mansouri (FRA)										2	0	2
2	Maria Masini (ITA)										2	0	2
2	Daria Nazarkina (RUS)										2	0	2
2	Olivia Nicholls (GBR)										2	0	2
2	Michika Ozeki (JPN)										2	0	2
2	Natasha Palha (IND)										2	0	2
2	Laura Pigossi (BRA)										2	0	2
2	Elena Rybakina (RUS)										2	0	2
2	Sofia Sewing (USA)										2	0	2
2	Kateryna Sliusar (UKR)										2	0	2
2	Adriana Sosnovschi (MDA)										2	0	2
2	Martina Spigarelli (ITA)										2	0	2
2	Vitalia Stamat (MDA)										2	0	2
2	Jelena Stojanovic (AUS)										2	0	2
2	Rishika Sunkara (IND)										2	0	2
2	Alena Tarasova (RUS)										2	0	2
2	Miriana Tona (ITA)										2	0	2
2	Natália Vajdová (SVK)										2	0	2
2	Erika Vogelsang (NED)										2	0	2
2	You Xiaodi (CHN)										2	0	2
2	Marcela Zacarías (MEX)										2	0	2
2	Zhang Ying (CHN)										2	0	2
1	Jana Čepelová (SVK)	1										1	0
1	Irina Falconi (USA)	1										1	0
1	Johanna Larsson (SWE)	1										1	0
1	Maryna Zanevska (BEL)	1										1	0
1	Olga Govortsova (BLR)			1								1	0
1	Denisa Allertová (CZE)					1						1	0
1	Amanda Anisimova (USA)					1						1	0
1	Gréta Arn (HUN)					1						1	0
1	Sara Errani (ITA)					1						1	0
1	Sesil Karatantcheva (BUL)					1						1	0
1	Anett Kontaveit (EST)					1						1	0
1	Tamara Korpatsch (GER)					1						1	0
1	Kateryna Kozlova (UKR)					1						1	0
1	Jamie Loeb (USA)					1						1	0
1	Grace Min (USA)					1						1	0
1	Sachia Vickery (USA)					1						1	0
1	Zhu Lin (CHN)					1						1	0
1	Paula Badosa Gibert (ESP)							1				1	0
1	Kimberly Birrell (AUS)							1				1	0
1	Martina Di Giuseppe (ITA)							1				1	0
1	Kathinka von Deichmann (LIE)							1				1	0
1	Anna-Lena Friedsam (GER)							1				1	0
1	Giulia Gatto-Monticone (ITA)							1				1	0
1	Nicole Gibbs (USA)							1				1	0
1	Barbara Haas (AUT)							1				1	0
1	Marta Kostyuk (UKR)							1				1	0
1	Ashley Lahey (USA)							1				1	0
1	Quirine Lemoine (NED)							1				1	0
1	Polina Leykina (RUS)							1				1	0
1	Petra Martić (CRO)							1				1	0
1	Marina Melnikova (RUS)							1				1	0
1	Mai Minokoshi (JPN)							1				1	0
1	Rebecca Peterson (SWE)							1				1	0
1	Jessica Pieri (ITA)							1				1	0
1	Katarzyna Piter (POL)							1				1	0
1	Katerina Stewart (USA)							1				1	0
1	Jil Teichmann (SUI)							1				1	0
1	Martina Trevisan (ITA)							1				1	0
1	Katarina Zavatska (UKR)							1				1	0
1	Gozal Ainitdinova (KAZ)									1		1	0
1	Nina Alibalić (AUS)									1		1	0
1	Tessah Andrianjafitrimo (FRA)									1		1	0
1	Emiliana Arango (COL)									1		1	0
1	Polina Bakhmutkina (RUS)									1		1	0
1	Karen Barritza (DEN)									1		1	0
1	Riya Bhatia (IND)									1		1	0
1	Katie Boulter (GBR)									1		1	0
1	Lucia Bronzetti (ITA)									1		1	0
1	Miriam Bianca Bulgaru (ROU)									1		1	0
1	Hanna Chang (USA)									1		1	0
1	Eudice Chong (HKG)									1		1	0
1	Olga Danilović (SRB)									1		1	0
1	Salma Ewing (USA)									1		1	0
1	Varvara Flink (RUS)									1		1	0
1	Varvara Gracheva (RUS)									1		1	0
1	Alexa Graham (USA)									1		1	0
1	Priscilla Heise (FRA)									1		1	0
1	Claudia Hoste Ferrer (ESP)									1		1	0
1	Francesca Jones (GBR)									1		1	0
1	Lenka Juríková (SVK)									1		1	0
1	Kaja Juvan (SLO)									1		1	0
1	Kim Da-bin (KOR)									1		1	0
1	Dana Kremer (GER)									1		1	0
1	Nika Kukharchuk (RUS)									1		1	0
1	Michelle Larcher de Brito (POR)									1		1	0
1	Ann Li (USA)									1		1	0
1	Sinéad Lohan (IRL)									1		1	0
1	Maria Marfutina (RUS)									1		1	0
1	Guiomar Maristany (ESP)									1		1	0
1	Pernilla Mendesová (CZE)									1		1	0
1	Lara Michel (SUI)									1		1	0
1	Andreea Mitu (ROU)									1		1	0
1	Mallaurie Noël (FRA)									1		1	0
1	Ioana Diana Pietroiu (ROU)									1		1	0
1	Tereza Procházková (CZE)									1		1	0
1	Irina Ramialison (FRA)									1		1	0
1	Eden Silva (GBR)									1		1	0
1	Margarita Skryabina (RUS)									1		1	0
1	Diana Šumová (CZE)									1		1	0
1	Harmony Tan (FRA)									1		1	0
1	Clara Tauson (DEN)									1		1	0
1	Marie Témin (FRA)									1		1	0
1	Bunyawi Thamchaiwat (THA)									1		1	0
1	Sara Tomic (AUS)									1		1	0
1	Gergana Topalova (BUL)									1		1	0
1	Rocío de la Torre Sánchez (ESP)									1		1	0
1	Draginja Vuković (SRB)									1		1	0
1	Vera Zvonareva (RUS)									1		1	0
1	Shuko Aoyama (JPN)		1									0	1
1	Naomi Broady (GBR)		1									0	1
1	Hsieh Su-wei (TPE)		1									0	1
1	Jessica Moore (AUS)		1									0	1
1	Yuki Naito (JPN)		1									0	1
1	Heather Watson (GBR)		1									0	1
1	Ashley Weinhold (USA)		1									0	1
1	Yanina Wickmayer (BEL)		1									0	1
1	Yang Zhaoxuan (CHN)		1									0	1
1	Amandine Hesse (FRA)				1							0	1
1	Tara Moore (GBR)				1							0	1
1	Victoria Rodríguez (MEX)				1							0	1
1	Usue Maitane Arconada (USA)						1					0	1
1	Nicola Geuer (GER)						1					0	1
1	Zoe Hives (AUS)						1					0	1
1	Lyudmyla Kichenok (UKR)						1					0	1
1	Nadiia Kichenok (UKR)						1					0	1
1	Nicole Melichar (USA)						1					0	1
1	Makoto Ninomiya (JPN)						1					0	1
1	Arina Rodionova (AUS)						1					0	1
1	Erin Routliffe (NZL)						1					0	1
1	Sílvia Soler Espinosa (ESP)						1					0	1
1	Barbora Štefková (CZE)						1					0	1
1	Prarthana Thombare (IND)						1					0	1
1	Akgul Amanmuradova (UZB)								1			0	1
1	Alicia Barnett (GBR)								1			0	1
1	Kseniia Bekker (RUS)								1			0	1
1	Daneika Borthwick (GBR)								1			0	1
1	Alexandra Cadanțu (ROU)								1			0	1
1	Carolin Daniels (GER)								1			0	1
1	Harriet Dart (GBR)								1			0	1
1	Kayla Day (USA)								1			0	1
1	Victoria Duval (USA)								1			0	1
1	Chisa Hosonuma (JPN)								1			0	1
1	Jang Su-jeong (KOR)								1			0	1
1	Ida Jarlskog (SWE)								1			0	1
1	Katarzyna Kawa (POL)								1			0	1
1	Xenia Knoll (SUI)								1			0	1
1	Barbora Krejčíková (CZE)								1			0	1
1	Noppawan Lertcheewakarn (THA)								1			0	1
1	Nicha Lertpitaksinchai (THA)								1			0	1
1	Genevieve Lorbergs (AUS)								1			0	1
1	Kanako Morisaki (JPN)								1			0	1
1	Alexandra Mueller (USA)								1			0	1
1	Ganna Poznikhirenko (UKR)								1			0	1
1	Charlotte Römer (ECU)								1			0	1
1	Maria Sanchez (USA)								1			0	1
1	Erika Sema (JPN)								1			0	1
1	Valeriya Solovyeva (RUS)								1			0	1
1	Fanny Stollár (HUN)								1			0	1
1	Cristina Adamescu (ROU)										1	0	1
1	Cemre Anıl (TUR)										1	0	1
1	Amina Anshba (RUS)										1	0	1
1	Federica Arcidiacono (ITA)										1	0	1
1	Paula Arias Manjón (ESP)										1	0	1
1	Mathilde Armitano (FRA)										1	0	1
1	Alice Balducci (ITA)										1	0	1
1	Chloe Beck (USA)										1	0	1
1	Marie Benoît (BEL)										1	0	1
1	Elyne Boeykens (BEL)										1	0	1
1	Isabelle Boulais (CAN)										1	0	1
1	Noelia Bouzó Zanotti (ESP)										1	0	1
1	Chen Jiahui (CHN)										1	0	1
1	Cho I-hsuan (TPE)										1	0	1
1	Cho Yi-tsen (TPE)										1	0	1
1	Maja Chwalińska (POL)										1	0	1
1	Paulina Czarnik (POL)										1	0	1
1	Valeriya Denisenko (RUS)										1	0	1
1	Anastasia Dețiuc (MDA)										1	0	1
1	Mathilde Devits (BEL)										1	0	1
1	Sofia Dmitrieva (RUS)										1	0	1
1	Misa Eguchi (JPN)										1	0	1
1	Lauren Embree (USA)										1	0	1
1	Cristina Ene (ROU)										1	0	1
1	Feng Shuo (CHN)										1	0	1
1	Arabela Fernández Rabener (ESP)										1	0	1
1	Irina Fetecău (ROU)										1	0	1
1	Arina Folts (UZB)										1	0	1
1	Manisha Foster (GBR)										1	0	1
1	Ingrid Gamarra Martins (BRA)										1	0	1
1	Britt Geukens (BEL)										1	0	1
1	Andreea Ghițescu (ROU)										1	0	1
1	Chiara Grimm (SUI)										1	0	1
1	Lorraine Guillermo (USA)										1	0	1
1	Han Sung-hee (KOR)										1	0	1
1	Arianne Hartono (NED)										1	0	1
1	Malene Helgø (NOR)										1	0	1
1	Katharina Hering (GER)										1	0	1
1	Merel Hoedt (NED)										1	0	1
1	Gabriela Horáčková (CZE)										1	0	1
1	Kristýna Hrabalová (CZE)										1	0	1
1	Hsieh Shu-ying (TPE)										1	0	1
1	Anna Iakovleva (RUS)										1	0	1
1	Ylena In-Albon (SUI)										1	0	1
1	Mia Jurašić (CRO)										1	0	1
1	Anastasia Kharitonova (RUS)										1	0	1
1	Melanie Klaffner (AUT)										1	0	1
1	Anna Klasen (GER)										1	0	1
1	Romy Kölzer (GER)										1	0	1
1	Pia König (AUT)										1	0	1
1	Barbara Kötelesová (SVK)										1	0	1
1	Shelly Krolitzky (ISR)										1	0	1
1	Nina Kruijer (NED)										1	0	1
1	Daria Kuczer (POL)										1	0	1
1	Anastasia Kulikova (RUS)										1	0	1
1	Yulia Kulikova (RUS)										1	0	1
1	Suzan Lamens (NED)										1	0	1
1	Margarita Lazareva (RUS)										1	0	1
1	Liang En-shuo (TPE)										1	0	1
1	Lisa-Marie Mätschke (GER)										1	0	1
1	Linnéa Malmqvist (SWE)										1	0	1
1	Elena Malygina (EST)										1	0	1
1	Bojana Marinković (SRB)										1	0	1
1	Johana Marková (CZE)										1	0	1
1	Rebeka Masarova (SUI)										1	0	1
1	Caty McNally (USA)										1	0	1
1	Yuriko Miyazaki (JPN)										1	0	1
1	Carlota Molina Megías (ESP)										1	0	1
1	Tamachan Momkoonthod (THA)										1	0	1
1	Ángeles Moreno Barranquero (ESP)										1	0	1
1	Viktória Morvayová (SVK)										1	0	1
1	Chihiro Muramatsu (JPN)										1	0	1
1	Emma Navarro (USA)										1	0	1
1	Gyulnara Nazarova (UKR)										1	0	1
1	Stephanie Nemtsova (USA)										1	0	1
1	Ni Ma Zhuoma (CHN)										1	0	1
1	Paula Ormaechea (ARG)										1	0	1
1	Giulia Pairone (ITA)										1	0	1
1	Francesca Palmigiano (ITA)										1	0	1
1	Chloé Paquet (FRA)										1	0	1
1	Diane Parry (FRA)										1	0	1
1	Sally Peers (AUS)										1	0	1
1	Polina Pekhova (BLR)										1	0	1
1	María Paulina Pérez (COL)										1	0	1
1	Paula Andrea Pérez (COL)										1	0	1
1	Alexandra Perper (MDA)										1	0	1
1	Stephanie Mariel Petit (ARG)										1	0	1
1	Eduarda Piai (BRA)										1	0	1
1	Tatiana Pieri (ITA)										1	0	1
1	Tatiana Pieri (ITA)										1	0	1
1	Shaline-Doreen Pipa (GER)										1	0	1
1	Nika Radišič (SLO)										1	0	1
1	Anna-Giulia Remondina (ITA)										1	0	1
1	Kajsa Rinaldo Persson (SWE)										1	0	1
1	Charlotte Robillard-Millette (CAN)										1	0	1
1	Monica Robinson (USA)										1	0	1
1	Lena Rüffer (GER)										1	0	1
1	Lara Salden (BEL)										1	0	1
1	Chantal Sauvant (GER)										1	0	1
1	Zoë Gwen Scandalis (USA)										1	0	1
1	Ekaterina Shalimova (RUS)										1	0	1
1	Ksenija Sharifova (RUS)										1	0	1
1	Mayar Sherif (EGY)										1	0	1
1	Kyra Shroff (IND)										1	0	1
1	Anna Slováková (CZE)										1	0	1
1	Anna Smith (GBR)										1	0	1
1	Maria Solnyshkina (RUS)										1	0	1
1	Dalila Spiteri (ITA)										1	0	1
1	Julyette Steur (GER)										1	0	1
1	Lexie Stevens (NED)										1	0	1
1	Tess Sugnaux (SUI)										1	0	1
1	Natalie Suk (USA)										1	0	1
1	Sun Ziyue (CHN)										1	0	1
1	Jade Suvrijn (FRA)										1	0	1
1	Maya Tahan (ISR)										1	0	1
1	Shalimar Talbi (BLR)										1	0	1
1	Shelby Talcott (USA)										1	0	1
1	Yuuki Tanaka (JPN)										1	0	1
1	Gabriela Nicole Tătăruș (ROU)										1	0	1
1	Isabella Tcherkes Zade (ITA)										1	0	1
1	Karman Kaur Thandi (IND)										1	0	1
1	Nikola Tomanová (CZE)										1	0	1
1	Ani Vangelova (BUL)										1	0	1
1	Chelsea Vanhoutte (BEL)										1	0	1
1	Arina Gabriela Vasilescu (ROU)										1	0	1
1	Andrea Renée Villarreal (MEX)										1	0	1
1	Stéphanie Visscher (NED)										1	0	1
1	Alexandra Walters (AUS)										1	0	1
1	Anastasiya Yakimova (BLR)										1	0	1
1	Ekaterina Yashina (RUS)										1	0	1
1	Margot Yerolymos (FRA)										1	0	1
1	You Mi Zhuoma (CHN)										1	0	1
1	Zang Jiaxue (CHN)										1	0	1
1	Joanna Zawadzka (POL)										1	0	1
1	Valeriya Zeleva (RUS)										1	0	1
1	Zhao Xiaoxi (CHN)										1	0	1
1	Amy Zhu (USA)										1	0	1
1	Angelina Zhuravleva (RUS)										1	0	1
1	Vendula Žovincová (CZE)										1	0	1

=== Titles won by nation ===
Updated as of December 31

Total	Nation	$100K		$80K		$60K		$25K		$15K		Total	
Total	Nation	S	D	S	D	S	D	S	D	S	D	S	D
123	Russia (RUS)		6		2	4	5	16	32	22	36	42	81
96	United States (USA)	1	3	4	4	9	8	15	21	8	23	37	59
77	Romania (ROU)	1	1	1	1	4	1	8	15	25	20	39	38
71	Italy (ITA)	1				2	1	10	10	17	30	30	41
52	Japan (JPN)		2		1		5	8	17	3	16	11	41
50	Spain (ESP)						1	7	9	17	16	24	26
49	Australia (AUS)		2			1	7	8	11	12	8	21	28
46	Germany (GER)	2				1	2	2	7	14	18	19	27
42	China (CHN)	3	2			3	4	5	7	6	12	17	25
41	Czech Republic (CZE)	1		1		1	1	3	8	14	12	20	21
39	United Kingdom (GBR)		2		1	1	2	3	4	12	14	16	23
37	Ukraine (UKR)				1	2	2	6	6	7	13	15	22
35	Slovakia (SVK)	3		2		1	1	5	3	6	14	17	18
34	France (FRA)				1			3	2	19	9	22	12
31	Belarus (BLR)			1			3	3	8	5	11	9	22
31	Belgium (BEL)	1	2			1	2		5	5	15	7	24
30	Brazil (BRA)	1					1	1	9	6	12	8	22
28	Switzerland (SUI)	2	1		1			4	3	6	11	12	16
26	Chile (CHI)					1	4	1	3	6	11	8	18
26	Chinese Taipei (TPE)		1				1	1	3	6	14	7	19
25	Netherlands (NED)					2	1	4	5	1	12	7	18
23	India (IND)						2		3	5	13	5	18
21	Mexico (MEX)				1		2		8	3	7	3	18
20	Bulgaria (BUL)		1			1		2	3	4	9	7	13
20	Turkey (TUR)					1	1		3	4	11	5	15
18	Sweden (SWE)	1						1	4	6	6	8	10
17	Serbia (SRB)		1				3	2	1	6	4	8	9
16	Slovenia (SLO)					3		5		3	5	11	5
16	Thailand (THA)							4	5	3	4	7	9
16	South Korea (KOR)							1	5	4	6	5	11
15	Poland (POL)		1					3	1	6	4	9	6
15	Argentina (ARG)		2				3		2	2	6	2	13
13	Greece (GRE)							1	1	8	3	9	4
13	Bosnia and Herzegovina (BIH)								2	3	8	3	10
12	Hungary (HUN)					1			1	5	5	6	6
12	Colombia (COL)		1						1	5	5	5	7
11	Canada (CAN)	1					2	5			3	6	5
11	Georgia (GEO)						1			6	4	6	5
11	Croatia (CRO)							1	3	2	5	3	8
11	Paraguay (PAR)						1			2	8	2	9
9	Venezuela (VEN)							1	5	2	1	3	6
9	Uzbekistan (UZB)							2	3		4	2	7
8	Israel (ISR)						1	2	2	1	2	3	5
7	Austria (AUT)							2		1	4	3	4
7	Egypt (EGY)									3	4	3	4
6	Norway (NOR)							3		1	2	4	2
6	Denmark (DEN)									2	4	2	4
6	Finland (FIN)									1	5	1	5
6	Latvia (LAT)						1		2		3	0	6
5	Kazakhstan (KAZ)	1						1		2	1	4	1
5	Estonia (EST)					1		2		1	1	4	1
5	South Africa (RSA)								1	2	2	2	3
5	Montenegro (MNE)								3		2	0	5
5	Moldova (MDA)										5	0	5
4	Portugal (POR)									1	3	1	3
4	Papua New Guinea (PNG)								4			0	4
4	Kyrgyzstan (KGZ)								1		3	0	4
3	Hong Kong (HKG)							1		2		3	0
3	Macedonia (MKD)							1	2			1	2
3	Indonesia (INA)								1		2	0	3
3	Bolivia (BOL)										3	0	3
2	Algeria (ALG)									1	1	1	1
2	Oman (OMA)									1	1	1	1
1	Liechtenstein (LIE)							1				1	0
1	Ireland (IRL)									1		1	0
1	New Zealand (NZL)						1					0	1
1	Ecuador (ECU)								1			0	1

- Alena Fomina started representing Russia in October, she won one title while representing Ukraine.

== See also ==
- 2017 WTA Tour
- 2017 WTA 125K series
- 2017 ATP World Tour
- 2017 ATP Challenger Tour
- 2017 ITF Men's Circuit
