= Ronnie Schneider (tennis) =

American tennis player (born 1994)

- Country (sports): United States
- Residence: Bloomington, Indiana, United States
- Born: September 27, 1994 (age 31) Bloomington, Indiana, United States
- Height: 5 ft 9 in (1.75 m)
- Plays: Right-handed
- College: North Carolina
- Coach: Bryan Smith
- Prize money: $49,247

Singles
- Career record: 0–0 (at ATP Tour level, Grand Slam level, and in Davis Cup)
- Career titles: 2 ITF
- Highest ranking: No. 406 (9 September 2018)

Doubles
- Career record: 0–1 (at ATP Tour level, Grand Slam level, and in Davis Cup)
- Career titles: 6 ITF
- Highest ranking: No. 313 (12 October 2018)

Grand Slam doubles results
- US Open: 1R (2013)

Ronnie Schneider (born September 27, 1994) is an American tennis player.

Schneider has a career high ATP singles ranking of No. 406 achieved on 9 September 2018 and a career high ATP doubles ranking of No. 313 achieved on 12 October 2018.

Schneider made his Grand Slam main draw debut at the 2013 US Open in the doubles draw partnering Paul Oosterbaan.

Schneider played college tennis at the University of North Carolina at Chapel Hill.
