= 2011 Virginia National Bank Men's Pro Championship – Singles =

Singles
- 2011 Virginia National Bank Men's Pro Championship

Final
- Champion: (South Africa) Izak van der Merwe
- Runner-up: (United States) Jesse Levine
- Score: 4–6, 6–3, 6–4

Events
| Singles | Doubles |
| ← 2010 · | Virginia National Bank Men's Pro Championship | · 2012 → |

Robert Kendrick was the defending champion but decided not to participate. Izak van der Merwe won the title, defeating Jesse Levine 4–6, 6–3, 6–4 in the final.

== Seeds ==
1. (India) Somdev Devvarman (second round, retired due to right shoulder injury)
2. (United States) Michael Russell (quarterfinals)
3. (United States) Bobby Reynolds (quarterfinals)
4. (South Africa) Rik de Voest (second round)
5. (South Africa) Izak van der Merwe (champion)
6. (Belarus) Uladzimir Ignatik (first round)
7. (United States) Michael Yani (second round)
8. (France) Vincent Millot (quarterfinals)

== Draw ==
=== Key ===
- Q = Qualifier
- WC = Wild card
- LL = Lucky loser
- Alt = Alternate
- SE = Special exempt
- PR = Protected ranking
- ITF = ITF entry
- JE = Junior exempt
- w/o = Walkover
- r = Retired
- d = Defaulted
- SR = Special ranking

=== Finals ===
Semifinals
WC | (United States) Denis Kudla | 3 | 6^{4}
5 | (South Africa) Izak van der Merwe | 6 | 7^{7}
(Finland) Harri Heliövaara | 5 | 0
Q | (United States) Jesse Levine | 7 | 6

Final
5 | (South Africa) Izak van der Merwe | 4 | 6 | 6
Q | (United States) Jesse Levine | 6 | 3 | 4

=== Top half ===
First round
1 | (India) S Devvarman | 7 | 6
(Australia) G Jones | 5 | 3
(South Africa) F Wolmarans | 6 | 5 | 6^{5}
WC | (United States) D Kudla | 3 | 7 | 7^{7}
(Bosnia and Herzegovina) A Delić | 6 | 6
(Moldova) R Borvanov | 2 | 2
LL | (United Kingdom) A Bogdanovic | 7^{7} | 6
6 | (Belarus) U Ignatik | 6^{5} | 1
3 | (United States) B Reynolds | 7^{7} | 3 | 6
WC | (India) S Singh | 6^{4} | 6 | 2
Q | (United States) Jarmere Jenkins | 6 | 7
(Canada) P-L Duclos | 2 | 5
(Denmark) F Nielsen | 6 | 3 | 4
(Canada) É Chvojka | 4 | 6 | 6
(United Kingdom) J Baker | 6^{1} | 4
5 | (South Africa) I van der Merwe | 7^{7} | 6

Second round
1 | (India) S Devvarman | 3 | 6 | 1^{r}
WC | (United States) D Kudla | 6 | 3 | 2
(Bosnia and Herzegovina) A Delić | 6^{5} | 6 | 3
LL | (United Kingdom) A Bogdanovic | 7^{7} | 3 | 6
3 | (United States) B Reynolds | 6^{4} | 6 | 6
Q | (United States) J Jenkins | 7^{7} | 2 | 4
(Canada) É Chvojka | 6^{7} | 2
5 | (South Africa) I van der Merwe | 7^{9} | 6

Quarterfinals
WC | (United States) D Kudla | 7^{7} | 6
LL | (United Kingdom) A Bogdanovic | 6^{3} | 4
3 | (United States) B Reynolds | 2 | 6 | 4
5 | (South Africa) I van der Merwe | 6 | 4 | 6

Semifinals
WC | (United States) D Kudla | 3 | 6^{4}
5 | (South Africa) I van der Merwe | 6 | 7^{7}

=== Bottom half ===
First round
8 | (France) V Millot | 2 | 6 | 6
WC | (United States) M Shabaz | 6 | 4 | 1
(United States) T Smyczek | 6 | 4 | 7
(United States) A Kuznetsov | 3 | 6 | 5
(Ukraine) D Molchanov | 5 | 7^{7} | 2
(Finland) H Heliövaara | 7 | 6^{3} | 6
(Russia) D Matsukevich | 0 | 6^{2}
4 | (South Africa) R de Voest | 6 | 7^{7}
7 | (United States) M Yani | 6 | 6
(Australia) C Guccione | 3 | 3
Q | (United States) J Levine | 4 | 7^{7} | 7^{7}
Q | (Australia) C Ball | 6 | 6^{3} | 6^{5}
Q | (United States) S Johnson | 7^{7} | 6
WC | (United States) J Sock | 6^{5} | 4
(South Africa) R Klaasen | 4 | 6^{5}
2 | (United States) M Russell | 6 | 7^{7}

Second round
8 | (France) V Millot | 6^{3} | 6 | 7^{7}
(United States) T Smyczek | 7^{7} | 2 | 6^{5}
(Finland) H Heliövaara | 6 | 6
4 | (South Africa) R de Voest | 4 | 3
7 | (United States) M Yani | 1 | 2
Q | (United States) J Levine | 6 | 6
Q | (United States) S Johnson | 6^{5} | 7^{7} | 4
2 | (United States) M Russell | 7^{7} | 6^{3} | 6

Quarterfinals
8 | (France) V Millot | 7^{7} | 3 | 4
(Finland) H Heliövaara | 6^{0} | 6 | 6
Q | (United States) J Levine | 6 | 6
2 | (United States) M Russell | 4 | 1

Semifinals
(Finland) H Heliövaara | 5 | 0
Q | (United States) J Levine | 7 | 6
