= 2011 Virginia National Bank Men's Pro Championship – Doubles =

Doubles
- 2011 Virginia National Bank Men's Pro Championship

Final
- Champions: (Philippines) Treat Conrad Huey (United Kingdom) Dominic Inglot
- Runners-up: (United States) John Paul Fruttero (South Africa) Raven Klaasen
- Score: 4–6, 6–3, [10–7]

Events
Singles	Doubles
← 2010 ·	Virginia National Bank Men's Pro Championship	· 2012 →

Robert Kendrick and Donald Young were the defending champions but decided not to participate. Treat Conrad Huey and Dominic Inglot won the final 4–6, 6–3, [10–7] against John Paul Fruttero and Raven Klaasen.

== Seeds ==
1. (Germany) Martin Emmrich / (Sweden) Andreas Siljeström (first round)
2. (Australia) Jordan Kerr / (United States) David Martin (semifinals)
3. (United States) Travis Parrott / (United States) Bobby Reynolds (first round)
4. (United States) John Paul Fruttero / (South Africa) Raven Klaasen (final)

== Draw ==
=== Key ===
- Q = Qualifier
- WC = Wild card
- LL = Lucky loser
- Alt = Alternate
- SE = Special exempt
- PR = Protected ranking
- ITF = ITF entry
- JE = Junior exempt
- w/o = Walkover
- r = Retired
- d = Defaulted
- SR = Special ranking

=== Draw ===
First round
1	(Germany) M Emmrich (Sweden) A Siljeström	4	6	[8]
(Belarus) U Ignatik (Russia) D Matsukevich	6	1	[10]
(United States) N Monroe (United States) M Yani	6	6
Q	(United States) D Britton (United States) B Strode	3	4
4	(United States) JP Fruttero (South Africa) R Klaasen	6	6
(Moldova) R Borvanov (Australia) Nima Roshan	2	4
WC	(United States) A Kuznetsov (United States) T Smyczek	7	4	[4]
WC	(United States) M Shabaz (United States) J Sock	5	6	[10]
WC	(Philippines) TC Huey (United Kingdom) D Inglot	6	7^{7}
(Canada) P-L Duclos (Australia) G Jones	3	6^{3}
(South Africa) R de Voest (South Africa) I van der Merwe	7^{7}	6
3	(United States) T Parrott (United States) B Reynolds	6^{5}	4
(Bosnia and Herzegovina) A Delić (Australia) C Guccione	6^{2}	6	[8]
(Finland) H Heliövaara (Ukraine) D Molchanov	7^{7}	4	[10]
PR	(Australia) A Hubble (Denmark) F Nielsen	3	4
2	(Australia) J Kerr (United States) D Martin	6	6

Quarterfinals
(Belarus) U Ignatik (Russia) D Matsukevich	7^{7}	4	[10]
(United States) N Monroe (United States) M Yani	6^{4}	6	[8]
4	(United States) JP Fruttero (South Africa) R Klaasen	6	7^{7}
WC	(United States) M Shabaz (United States) J Sock	4	6^{5}
WC	(Philippines) TC Huey (United Kingdom) D Inglot	4	6	[10]
(South Africa) R de Voest (South Africa) I van der Merwe	6	4	[8]
(Finland) H Heliövaara (Ukraine) D Molchanov	3	6	[6]
2	(Australia) J Kerr (United States) D Martin	6	3	[10]

Semifinals
(Belarus) U Ignatik (Russia) D Matsukevich	5	4
4	(United States) JP Fruttero (South Africa) R Klaasen	7	6
WC	(Philippines) TC Huey (United Kingdom) D Inglot	7^{7}	6
2	(Australia) J Kerr (United States) D Martin	6^{4}	3

Final
4	(United States) JP Fruttero (South Africa) R Klaasen	6	3	[7]
WC	(Philippines) TC Huey (United Kingdom) D Inglot	4	6	[10]
