= 2013 Charlottesville Men's Pro Challenger – Doubles =

Doubles
- 2013 Charlottesville Men's Pro Challenger

Final
- Champion: (United States) Steve Johnson (United States) Tim Smyczek
- Runner-up: (United States) Jarmere Jenkins (United States) Donald Young
- Score: 6–4, 6–3

Events
Singles	Doubles
← 2012 ·	Charlottesville Men's Pro Challenger	· 2014 →

John Peers and John-Patrick Smith but Peers chose not to compete.
Smith chose to compete with Samuel Groth and lost to eventual champion Steve Johnson and Tim Smyczek.
They defeated Jarmere Jenkins and Donald Young 6–4, 6–3.

== Seeds ==
1. (Australia) Samuel Groth / (Australia) John-Patrick Smith (first round)
2. (United States) Austin Krajicek / (United States) Tennys Sandgren (semifinals)
3. (South Africa) Rik de Voest / (United States) Rajeev Ram (first round)
4. (Republic of Ireland) James Cluskey / (Austria) Maximilian Neuchrist (first round)

== Draw ==
=== Key ===
- Q = Qualifier
- WC = Wild card
- LL = Lucky loser
- Alt = Alternate
- SE = Special exempt
- PR = Protected ranking
- ITF = ITF entry
- JE = Junior exempt
- w/o = Walkover
- r = Retired
- d = Defaulted
- SR = Special ranking

=== Main draw ===
First round
1	(Australia) S Groth (Australia) J-P Smith	6^{3}	5
(United States) S Johnson (United States) T Smyczek	7^{7}	7
WC	(United States) C Buchanan (United States) B Fratangelo	2	3
(Australia) C Ball (Canada) Polansky	6	6
4	(Republic of Ireland) J Cluskey (Austria) M Neuchrist	6	2	[9]
(United Kingdom) D Rice (United Kingdom) S Thornley	4	6	[11]
(United States) A Kuznetsov (United States) R Williams	6	3	[10]
WC	(Greece) T Angelinos (United States) M Shabaz	3	6	[6]
(Canada) J Levine (Ukraine) D Molchanov	6	6
(Canada) F Peliwo (United States) D Zivkovic	1	2
(United States) J Jenkins (United States) D Young	6	7^{9}
3	(South Africa) R de Voest (United States) R Ram	2	6^{7}
(India) S Devvarman (India) S Singh	6	6
WC	(United States) Mitchell Frank (United States) M Styslinger	2	3
Q	(Dominican Republic) J Hernández (Canada) Milan Pokrajac	4	6	[9]
2	(United States) A Krajicek (United States) T Sandgren	6	3	[11]

Quarterfinals
(United States) S Johnson (United States) T Smyczek	6	7
(Australia) C Ball (Canada) Polansky	2	5
(United Kingdom) D Rice (United Kingdom) S Thornley	7	6
(United States) A Kuznetsov (United States) R Williams	5	3
(Canada) J Levine (Ukraine) D Molchanov	3	3
(United States) J Jenkins (United States) D Young	6	6
(India) S Devvarman (India) S Singh	4	2
2	(United States) A Krajicek (United States) T Sandgren	6	6

Semifinals
(United States) S Johnson (United States) T Smyczek	7^{8}	6
(United Kingdom) D Rice (United Kingdom) S Thornley	6^{6}	2
(United States) J Jenkins (United States) D Young	6	5	[10]
2	(United States) A Krajicek (United States) T Sandgren	4	7	[8]

Final
(United States) S Johnson (United States) T Smyczek	6	6
(United States) J Jenkins (United States) D Young	4	3
