= 2018 Charlottesville Men's Pro Challenger – Doubles =

Doubles
- 2018 Charlottesville Men's Pro Challenger

Final
- Champions: (Finland) Harri Heliövaara (Switzerland) Henri Laaksonen
- Runners-up: (Japan) Toshihide Matsui (Denmark) Frederik Nielsen
- Score: 6–3, 6–4

Events
Singles	Doubles
← 2017 ·	Charlottesville Men's Pro Challenger	· 2019 →

Denis Kudla and Danny Thomas were the defending champions but chose not to defend their title.

Harri Heliövaara and Henri Laaksonen won the title after defeating Toshihide Matsui and Frederik Nielsen 6–3, 6–4 in the final.

== Seeds ==
1. (India) Leander Paes / (Mexico) Miguel Ángel Reyes-Varela (quarterfinals)
2. (El Salvador) Marcelo Arévalo / (Venezuela) Roberto Maytín (semifinals)
3. (United States) Alex Lawson / (United States) Jackson Withrow (first round)
4. (Japan) Toshihide Matsui / (Denmark) Frederik Nielsen (final)

== Draw ==
=== Key ===
- Q = Qualifier
- WC = Wild card
- LL = Lucky loser
- Alt = Alternate
- SE = Special exempt
- PR = Protected ranking
- ITF = ITF entry
- JE = Junior exempt
- w/o = Walkover
- r = Retired
- d = Defaulted
- SR = Special ranking

First round
1	(India) L Paes (Mexico) MÁ Reyes-Varela	4	7^{7}	[13]
Q	(Russia) E Karlovskiy (Croatia) N Serdarušić	6	6^{0}	[11]
(Barbados) D King (United States) E King	6	6
(United States) B Fratangelo (United States) N Rubin	3	0
3	(United States) A Lawson (United States) J Withrow	3	7^{9}	[6]
(Philippines) R Gonzales (United States) N Lammons	6	6^{7}	[10]
(Finland) H Heliövaara (Switzerland) H Laaksonen	6	7^{7}
(United States) B Klahn (United States) T Smyczek	2	6^{1}
WC	(United States) JC Aragone (United States) S Kozlov	6	2	[10]
WC	(United States) T-S Kwiatkowski (United States) N Pasha	3	6	[8]
(Serbia) N Čačić (Kazakhstan) T Khabibulin	4	6^{3}
4	(Japan) T Matsui (Denmark) F Nielsen	6	7^{7}
(Canada) P Polansky (Canada) A Shamasdin	6	7^{7}
(Australia) M Reid (South Africa) R Roelofse	4	6^{4}
WC	(United States) H Johnson (United States) Y Johnson	2	3
2	(El Salvador) M Arévalo (Venezuela) R Maytín	6	6

Quarterfinals
1	(India) L Paes (Mexico) MÁ Reyes-Varela	6	4	[7]
(Barbados) D King (United States) E King	1	6	[10]
(Philippines) R Gonzales (United States) N Lammons	7^{7}	4	[5]
(Finland) H Heliövaara (Switzerland) H Laaksonen	6^{4}	6	[10]
WC	(United States) JC Aragone (United States) S Kozlov	6^{5}	1
4	(Japan) T Matsui (Denmark) F Nielsen	7^{7}	6
(Canada) P Polansky (Canada) A Shamasdin	6	3	[10]
2	(El Salvador) M Arévalo (Venezuela) R Maytín	4	6	[12]

Semifinals
(Barbados) D King (United States) E King	2	2
(Finland) H Heliövaara (Switzerland) H Laaksonen	6	6
4	(Japan) T Matsui (Denmark) F Nielsen	1	6	[10]
2	(El Salvador) M Arévalo (Venezuela) R Maytín	6	4	[6]

Final
(Finland) H Heliövaara (Switzerland) H Laaksonen	6	6
4	(Japan) T Matsui (Denmark) F Nielsen	3	4
