= 2017 Charlottesville Men's Pro Challenger =

- Date: 30 October – 5 November
- Edition: 9th
- Draw: 32S/16D/32QS/4QD
- Surface: Indoor Hard
- Location: Charlottesville, United States

Champions

Singles
- (United States) Tim Smyczek

Doubles
- (United States) Denis Kudla / (United States) Danny Thomas
← 2016 ·	Charlottesville Men's Pro Challenger	· 2018 →

The 2017 Charlottesville Men's Pro Challenger was a professional tennis tournament played on indoor hard courts. It was the ninth edition of the tournament which was part of the 2017 ATP Challenger Tour, taking place in Charlottesville, United States from October 30 to November 5, 2017.

== Singles main-draw entrants ==
=== Seeds ===
Country	Player	Rank^{1}	Seed
USA	Tennys Sandgren	92	1
SUI	Henri Laaksonen	94	2
GBR	Cameron Norrie	112	3
USA	Ernesto Escobedo	115	4
USA	Bjorn Fratangelo	118	5
USA	Stefan Kozlov	125	6
USA	Michael Mmoh	153	7
USA	Tommy Paul	159	8

- ^{1} Rankings are as of October 23, 2017.

=== Other entrants ===
The following players received wildcards into the singles main draw:

- (United States) JC Aragone
- (United States) Ernesto Escobedo
- (United States) Thai-Son Kwiatkowski
- (United States) Ryan Shane

The following players received entry from the qualifying draw:

- (United Kingdom) Edward Corrie
- (United States) Jared Hiltzik
- (South Africa) Ruan Roelofse
- (United States) Alex Rybakov

The following player received entry as lucky losers:

- (Canada) Samuel Monette
- (Denmark) Frederik Nielsen
- (United Kingdom) Neil Pauffley

== Champions ==
=== Singles ===
- (United States) Tim Smyczek def. (United States) Tennys Sandgren 6–7^{(5–7)}, 6–3, 6–2.

=== Doubles ===
- (United States) Denis Kudla / (United States) Danny Thomas def. (Australia) Jarryd Chaplin / (Latvia) Miķelis Lībietis 6–7^{(4–7)}, 1–4 ret.
