= 2018 Charlottesville Men's Pro Challenger – Singles =

Singles
- 2018 Charlottesville Men's Pro Challenger

Final
- Champion: (United States) Tommy Paul
- Runner-up: (Canada) Peter Polansky
- Score: 6–2, 6–2

Events
Singles	Doubles
← 2017 ·	Charlottesville Men's Pro Challenger	· 2019 →

Tim Smyczek was the defending champion but lost in the second round to Thai-Son Kwiatkowski.

Tommy Paul won the title after defeating Peter Polansky 6–2, 6–2 in the final.

== Seeds ==
1. (United States) Bradley Klahn (semifinals)
2. (United States) Michael Mmoh (quarterfinals)
3. (Croatia) Ivo Karlović (quarterfinals)
4. (South Africa) Lloyd Harris (first round)
5. (United States) Tim Smyczek (second round)
6. (Chinese Taipei) Jason Jung (first round)
7. (United States) Noah Rubin (first round)
8. (Canada) Peter Polansky (final)

== Draw ==
=== Key ===
- Q = Qualifier
- WC = Wild card
- LL = Lucky loser
- Alt = Alternate
- SE = Special exempt
- PR = Protected ranking
- ITF = ITF entry
- JE = Junior exempt
- w/o = Walkover
- r = Retired
- d = Defaulted
- SR = Special ranking

=== Finals ===
Semifinals
1/WC	(United States) Bradley Klahn	3	3
LL	(United States) Tommy Paul	6	6
8	(Canada) Peter Polansky	6	7^{7}
WC	(United States) Thai-Son Kwiatkowski	2	6^{4}

Final
LL	(United States) Tommy Paul	6	6
8	(Canada) Peter Polansky	2	2

=== Top half ===
First round
1/WC	(United States) B Klahn	6	2	6
Q	(Kazakhstan) D Yevseyev	3	6	3
(United Kingdom) J Ward	6	6
(United States) C Eubanks	1	4
(Croatia) N Serdarušić	6	6
(El Salvador) M Arévalo	4	2
(United States) B Fratangelo	6	6
6	(Chinese Taipei) J Jung	4	1
3	(Croatia) I Karlović	7	4	6
(United States) M Krueger	5	6	3
Q	(United States) M Giron	6	6
WC	(United States) C Altamirano	4	4
(Poland) K Majchrzak	6	6
(Switzerland) H Laaksonen	0	3
LL	(United States) T Paul	6	6
7	(United States) N Rubin	2	1

Second round
1/WC	(United States) B Klahn	6	6
(United Kingdom) J Ward	1	2
(Croatia) N Serdarušić	6	4	2
(United States) B Fratangelo	3	6	6
3	(Croatia) I Karlović	7^{7}	6
Q	(United States) M Giron	6^{4}	3
(Poland) K Majchrzak	2	1
LL	(United States) T Paul	6	6

Quarterfinals
1/WC	(United States) B Klahn	6	6
(United States) B Fratangelo	3	3
3	(Croatia) I Karlović	6^{5}	4
LL	(United States) T Paul	7^{7}	6

Semifinals
1/WC	(United States) B Klahn	3	3
LL	(United States) T Paul	6	6

=== Bottom half ===
First round
8	(Canada) P Polansky	6	7
LL	(United States) Jared Hiltzik	2	5
(Germany) T Kamke	6	3	6
(Germany) D Köpfer	1	6	1
Alt	(Netherlands) J Sels	6	5	7
(United States) JC Aragone	3	7	5
Q	(Cyprus) P Chrysochos	6	6
4	(South Africa) L Harris	1	3
5	(United States) T Smyczek	6	7
(Slovenia) B Rola	4	5
WC	(United States) T-S Kwiatkowski	6	2
Q	(United Kingdom) L Glasspool	2	3^{r}
(Australia) T Kokkinakis	4	7	3
(Russia) E Karlovskiy	6	5	6
(Barbados) D King	3	4
2/WC	(United States) M Mmoh	6	6

Second round
8	(Canada) P Polansky	7	7
(Germany) T Kamke	5	5
Alt	(Netherlands) J Sels	6	7^{7}
Q	(Cyprus) P Chrysochos	1	6^{4}
5	(United States) T Smyczek	2	7	2
WC	(United States) T-S Kwiatkowski	6	5	6
(Russia) E Karlovskiy	2	5
2/WC	(United States) M Mmoh	6	7

Quarterfinals
8	(Canada) P Polansky	7^{8}	6
Alt	(Netherlands) J Sels	6^{6}	4
WC	(United States) T-S Kwiatkowski	3	6	6
2/WC	(United States) M Mmoh	6	3	4

Semifinals
8	(Canada) P Polansky	6	7^{7}
WC	(United States) T-S Kwiatkowski	2	6^{4}
