= 2011 Virginia National Bank Men's Pro Championship =

- Date: 31 October – 6 November
- Edition: 3rd
- Surface: Hard (indoor)
- Location: Charlottesville, United States

Champions

Singles
- (South Africa) Izak van der Merwe

Doubles
- (Philippines) Treat Conrad Huey / (United Kingdom) Dominic Inglot
← 2010 ·	Virginia National Bank Men's Pro Championship	· 2012 →

The 2011 Virginia National Bank Men's Pro Championship was a professional tennis tournament played on hard courts. It was the third edition of the tournament which is part of the 2011 ATP Challenger Tour. It took place in Charlottesville, United States between 31 October and 6 November 2011.

== ATP entrants ==
=== Seeds ===
Country	Player	Rank^{1}	Seed
IND	Somdev Devvarman	84	1
USA	Michael Russell	93	2
USA	Bobby Reynolds	122	3
RSA	Rik de Voest	125	4
RSA	Izak van der Merwe	132	5
BLR	Uladzimir Ignatik	173	6
USA	Michael Yani	178	7
FRA	Vincent Millot	189	8

- ^{1} Rankings are as of October 24, 2011.

=== Other entrants ===
The following players received wildcards into the singles main draw:

- (United States) Denis Kudla
- (United States) Michael Shabaz
- (India) Sanam Singh
- (United States) Jack Sock

The following players received entry from the qualifying draw:

- (Australia) Carsten Ball
- (United States) Jarmere Jenkins
- (United States) Steve Johnson
- (United States) Jesse Levine

The following players received entry as a lucky loser into the singles main draw:

- (United Kingdom) Alex Bogdanovic

== Champions ==
=== Singles ===
(South Africa) Izak van der Merwe def. (United States) Jesse Levine, 4–6, 6–3, 6–4

=== Doubles ===
(Philippines) Treat Conrad Huey / (United Kingdom) Dominic Inglot def. (United States) John Paul Fruttero / (South Africa) Raven Klaasen, 4–6, 6–3, [10–7]
