= 2024 Charlottesville Men's Pro Challenger – Doubles =

Doubles
- 2024 Charlottesville Men's Pro Challenger

Final
- Champions: (United States) Robert Cash (United States) JJ Tracy
- Runners-up: (Luxembourg) Chris Rodesch (United States) William Woodall
- Score: 4–6, 7–6^{(9–7)}, [10–7]

Events
Singles	Doubles
- Charlottesville Men's Pro Challenger

John-Patrick Smith and Sem Verbeek were the defending champions but chose not to defend their title.

Robert Cash and JJ Tracy won the title after defeating Chris Rodesch and William Woodall 4–6, 7–6^{(9–7)}, [10–7] in the final.

== Seeds ==
1. (United States) Ryan Seggerman / (United States) Patrik Trhac (first round)
2. (Brazil) Marcelo Demoliner / (United States) Christian Harrison (quarterfinals)
3. (Mexico) Hans Hach Verdugo / (Poland) Szymon Walków (quarterfinals)
4. (United States) Trey Hilderbrand / (United States) Alex Lawson (quarterfinals)

== Draw ==
Key

- Q = Qualifier
- WC = Wild card
- LL = Lucky loser
- Alt = Alternate
- ITF = ITF entry
- PR = Protected ranking
- SR = Special ranking
- SE = Special exempt
- JE = Junior exempt
- JR = Junior Accelerator Programme entrant
- CO = College Accelerator Programme entrant
- NG = Next Gen Accelerator Program entrant
- w/o = Walkover
- r = Retired
- d = Defaulted

=== Draw ===
First round
1	(United States) R Seggerman (United States) P Trhac	3	6^{3}
(Canada) C Harper (United States) E Spizzirri	6	7^{7}
(United States) B Holt (United States) M Krueger	4	5
PR	(France) E Couacaud (Slovenia) B Rola	6	7
3	(Mexico) H Hach Verdugo (Poland) S Walków	7^{8}	6
(Antigua and Barbuda) J Maginley (United States) E Quinn	6^{6}	2
(Colombia) N Mejía (Colombia) A Urrea	2	3
WC	(Luxembourg) C Rodesch (United States) W Woodall	6	6
(Australia) P Harper (New Zealand) F Reynolds	6	6
(Israel) R Stepanov (Canada) K Stevenson	4	4
WC	(United States) Andre Ilagan (United States) P Kumar	4	6^{4}
4	(United States) T Hilderbrand (United States) A Lawson	6	7^{7}
(United States) R Cash (United States) JJ Tracy	4	6	[10]
(Kazakhstan) D Popko (Kazakhstan) B Zhukayev	6	4	[4]
(United States) Tennyson Whiting (Germany) P Zahraj	3	3
2	(Brazil) M Demoliner (United States) C Harrison	6	6

Quarterfinals
(Canada) C Harper (United States) E Spizzirri	7^{7}	7^{7}
PR	(France) E Couacaud (Slovenia) B Rola	6^{4}	6^{4}
3	(Mexico) H Hach Verdugo (Poland) S Walków	7^{10}	1	[8]
WC	(Luxembourg) C Rodesch (United States) W Woodall	6^{8}	6	[10]
(Australia) P Harper (New Zealand) F Reynolds	7^{7}	4	[14]
4	(United States) T Hilderbrand (United States) A Lawson	6^{2}	6	[12]
(United States) R Cash (United States) JJ Tracy	6	7
2	(Brazil) M Demoliner (United States) C Harrison	2	5

Semifinals
(Canada) C Harper (United States) E Spizzirri	3	4
WC	(Luxembourg) C Rodesch (United States) W Woodall	6	6
(Australia) P Harper (New Zealand) F Reynolds	4	6^{4}
(United States) R Cash (United States) JJ Tracy	6	7^{7}

Final
WC	(Luxembourg) C Rodesch (United States) W Woodall	6	6^{7}	[7]
(United States) R Cash (United States) JJ Tracy	4	7^{9}	[10]
