= 2012 Charlottesville Men's Pro Challenger – Singles =

Singles
- 2012 Charlottesville Men's Pro Challenger

Final
- Champion: (United States) Denis Kudla
- Runner-up: (United States) Alex Kuznetsov
- Score: 6–0, 6–3

Events
| Singles | Doubles |
| ← 2011 · | Charlottesville Men's Pro Challenger | · 2013 → |

Izak van der Merwe was defending champion but defeated in the semifinals by Denis Kudla.
Kudla went on to win the title after defeating Alex Kuznetsov 6–0, 6–3 in the final.

== Seeds ==
1. (United States) Jesse Levine (first round)
2. (Russia) Alex Bogomolov Jr. (semifinals)
3. (United States) Michael Russell (withdrew)
4. (Germany) Mischa Zverev (first round)
5. (United States) Ryan Sweeting (first round)
6. (United States) Bobby Reynolds (second round)
7. (United States) Tim Smyczek (second round)
8. (United States) Denis Kudla (champion)

== Draw ==
=== Key ===
- Q = Qualifier
- WC = Wild card
- LL = Lucky loser
- Alt = Alternate
- SE = Special exempt
- PR = Protected ranking
- ITF = ITF entry
- JE = Junior exempt
- w/o = Walkover
- r = Retired
- d = Defaulted
- SR = Special ranking

=== Finals ===
Semifinals
(South Africa) Izak van der Merwe | 4 | 5
8 | (United States) Denis Kudla | 6 | 7
(United States) Alex Kuznetsov | 7^{7} | 7^{7}
2 | (Russia) Alex Bogomolov Jr. | 6^{5} | 6^{4}

Final
8 | (United States) Denis Kudla | 6 | 6
(United States) Alex Kuznetsov | 0 | 3

=== Top half ===
First round
1 | (United States) J Levine | 4 | 6 | 5
(United States) J Sock | 6 | 4 | 7
(South Africa) I van der Merwe | 6 | 6
Q | (United States) M Styslinger | 3 | 2
(Australia) J-P Smith | 6 | 6
(Colombia) R Farah | 3 | 1
Q | (United States) Eric Quigley | 6 | 3 | 4
6 | (United States) B Reynolds | 3 | 6 | 6
4 | (Germany) M Zverev | 6 | 5 | 4
WC | (India) S Devvarman | 4 | 7 | 6
(United States) D Kosakowski | 3 | 6 | 3
Q | (Japan) Taro Daniel | 6 | 1 | 6
(Switzerland) M Lammer | 0 | 6 | 7^{7}
(United States) D Young | 6 | 2 | 6^{3}
(United Kingdom) Daniel Smethurst | 0 | 2
8 | (United States) D Kudla | 6 | 6

Second round
(United States) J Sock | 3 | 4
(South Africa) I van der Merwe | 6 | 6
(Australia) J-P Smith | 7^{7} | 7^{7}
6 | (United States) B Reynolds | 6^{4} | 6^{3}
WC | (India) S Devvarman | 4 | 7 | 6
Q | (Japan) T Daniel | 6 | 5 | 1
(Switzerland) M Lammer | 3 | 6 | 4
8 | (United States) D Kudla | 6 | 4 | 6

Quarterfinals
(South Africa) I van der Merwe | 4 | 7^{7} | 6
(Australia) J-P Smith | 6 | 6^{3} | 4
WC | (India) S Devvarman | 2 | 0
8 | (United States) D Kudla | 6 | 6

Semifinals
(South Africa) I van der Merwe | 4 | 5
8 | (United States) D Kudla | 6 | 7

=== Bottom half ===
First round
7 | (United States) T Smyczek | 7 | 6
WC | (United States) Alexander Domijan | 5 | 4
(United States) B Klahn | 6 | 6
WC | (United States) M McClune | 3 | 3
(United States) A Kuznetsov | 6 | 6^{5} | 7
(Australia) S Groth | 3 | 7^{7} | 5
Q | (South Africa) F Wolmarans | 6 | 6
LL | (United States) D Britton | 4 | 3
5 | (United States) R Sweeting | 4 | 4
(United States) R Williams | 6 | 6
(United Kingdom) A Bogdanovic | 6^{5} | 5
(United States) S Johnson | 7^{7} | 7
WC | (United States) A Krajicek | 6 | 6
(Chinese Taipei) T-h Yang | 2 | 1
(United States) T Sandgren | 6 | 5 | 0
2 | (Russia) A Bogomolov Jr. | 1 | 7 | 6

Second round
7 | (United States) T Smyczek | 6 | 6^{9} | 3
(United States) B Klahn | 4 | 7^{11} | 6
(United States) A Kuznetsov | 6 | 7^{7}
Q | (South Africa) F Wolmarans | 4 | 6^{5}
(United States) R Williams | 4 | 6 | 6
(United States) S Johnson | 6 | 4 | 4
WC | (United States) A Krajicek | 3 | 4
2 | (Russia) A Bogomolov Jr. | 6 | 6

Quarterfinals
(United States) B Klahn | 7^{7} | 2 | 1
(United States) A Kuznetsov | 6^{5} | 6 | 6
(United States) R Williams | 6^{0} | 0
2 | (Russia) A Bogomolov Jr. | 7^{7} | 6

Semifinals
(United States) A Kuznetsov | 7^{7} | 7^{7}
2 | (Russia) A Bogomolov Jr. | 6^{5} | 6^{4}
