= 2017 Charlottesville Men's Pro Challenger – Singles =

Singles
- 2017 Charlottesville Men's Pro Challenger

Final
- Champion: (United States) Tim Smyczek
- Runner-up: (United States) Tennys Sandgren
- Score: 6–7^{(5–7)}, 6–3, 6–2

Events
Singles	Doubles
← 2016 ·	Charlottesville Men's Pro Challenger	· 2018 →

Reilly Opelka was the defending champion but lost in the first round to Tennys Sandgren.

Tim Smyczek won the title after defeating Tennys Sandgren 6–7^{(5–7)}, 6–3, 6–2 in the final.

== Seeds ==
1. (United States) Tennys Sandgren (final)
2. (Switzerland) Henri Laaksonen (quarterfinals, retired)
3. (United Kingdom) Cameron Norrie (second round)
4. (United States) Ernesto Escobedo (second round, retired)
5. (United States) Bjorn Fratangelo (first round)
6. (United States) Stefan Kozlov (semifinals)
7. (United States) Michael Mmoh (semifinals)
8. (United States) Tommy Paul (second round)

== Draw ==
=== Key ===
- Q = Qualifier
- WC = Wild card
- LL = Lucky loser
- Alt = Alternate
- SE = Special exempt
- PR = Protected ranking
- ITF = ITF entry
- JE = Junior exempt
- w/o = Walkover
- r = Retired
- d = Defaulted
- SR = Special ranking

=== Finals ===
Semifinals
1	(United States) Tennys Sandgren	6	6
7	(United States) Michael Mmoh	4	4
6	(United States) Stefan Kozlov	3	6	2
(United States) Tim Smyczek	6	2	6

Final
1	(United States) Tennys Sandgren	7^{7}	3	2
(United States) Tim Smyczek	6^{5}	6	6

=== Top half ===
First round
1	(United States) T Sandgren	6	6
(United States) R Opelka	3	4
Q	(United States) A Rybakov	4	4
(Slovakia) F Horanský	6	6
(Canada) B Schnur	7^{7}	6
WC	(United States) R Shane	6^{4}	4
(United States) K King	6^{2}	6	3
8	(United States) T Paul	7^{7}	2	6
3	(United Kingdom) C Norrie	6	6
(United States) D Novikov	3	1
LL	(United Kingdom) N Pauffley	6^{4}	2
Q	(South Africa) R Roelofse	7^{7}	6
(United States) C Eubanks	7^{11}	6
LL	(Canada) Samuel Monette	6^{9}	4
(United States) M McDonald	1	6^{2}
7	(United States) M Mmoh	6	7^{7}

Second round
1	(United States) T Sandgren	7	6
(Slovakia) F Horanský	5	3
(Canada) B Schnur	6	6
8	(United States) T Paul	3	4
3	(United Kingdom) C Norrie	6^{7}	2
Q	(South Africa) R Roelofse	7^{9}	6
(United States) C Eubanks	7^{7}	3	4
7	(United States) M Mmoh	6^{3}	6	6

Quarterfinals
1	(United States) T Sandgren	6	6
(Canada) B Schnur	1	2
Q	(South Africa) R Roelofse	6^{4}	4
7	(United States) M Mmoh	7^{7}	6

Semifinals
1	(United States) T Sandgren	6	6
7	(United States) M Mmoh	4	4

=== Bottom half ===
First round
6	(United States) S Kozlov	6	3	6
WC	(United States) T-S Kwiatkowski	1	6	3
(United Kingdom) L Broady	7	6^{4}	6
Q	(United States) Jared Hiltzik	5	7^{7}	4
(United States) D Kudla	6	6
WC	(United States) JC Aragone	2	3
(Germany) D Köpfer	1	6	5
4/WC	(United States) E Escobedo	6	2	7
5	(United States) B Fratangelo	7^{8}	7^{7}
LL	(Denmark) F Nielsen	6^{6}	6^{3}
(Germany) M Moraing	3	6	3
(United States) T Smyczek	6	3	6
Q	(United Kingdom) E Corrie	4	3
(Canada) F Peliwo	6	6
(United States) M Giron	4	4
2	(Switzerland) H Laaksonen	6	6

Second round
6	(United States) S Kozlov	6	4	6
(United Kingdom) L Broady	4	6	4
(United States) D Kudla	6^{5}	6	0
4/WC	(United States) E Escobedo	7^{7}	2	0^{r}
5	(United States) B Fratangelo	1	2
(United States) T Smyczek	6	6
(Canada) F Peliwo	6	2	2
2	(Switzerland) H Laaksonen	4	6	6

Quarterfinals
6	(United States) S Kozlov	6	6
(United States) D Kudla	4	3
(United States) T Smyczek	7^{7}	2
2	(Switzerland) H Laaksonen	6^{2}	1^{r}

Semifinals
6	(United States) S Kozlov	3	6	2
(United States) T Smyczek	6	2	6
