= 2013 Charlottesville Men's Pro Challenger – Singles =

Singles
- 2013 Charlottesville Men's Pro Challenger

Final
- Champion: (United States) Michael Russell
- Runner-up: (Canada) Peter Polansky
- Score: 7–5, 2–6, 7–6^{(7–5)}

Events
| Singles | Doubles |
| ← 2012 · | Charlottesville Men's Pro Challenger | · 2014 → |

Denis Kudla was the defending champion but chose not to compete.
Michael Russell defeated Peter Polansky in the singles final, 7–5, 2–6, 7–6^{(7–5)}.

== Seeds ==
1. (United States) Tim Smyczek (first round)
2. (India) Somdev Devvarman (quarterfinals)
3. (United States) Michael Russell (champion)
4. (United States) Donald Young (quarterfinals)
5. (United States) Rajeev Ram (second round)
6. (United States) Alex Kuznetsov (first round)
7. (United States) Rhyne Williams (semifinals)
8. (United States) Steve Johnson (first round)

== Draw ==
=== Key ===
- Q = Qualifier
- WC = Wild card
- LL = Lucky loser
- Alt = Alternate
- SE = Special exempt
- PR = Protected ranking
- ITF = ITF entry
- JE = Junior exempt
- w/o = Walkover
- r = Retired
- d = Defaulted
- SR = Special ranking

=== Finals ===
Semifinals
(Canada) Jesse Levine | 0 | 1^{r}
3 | (United States) Michael Russell | 6 | 3
(Canada) Peter Polansky | 2 | 6 | 6
7 | (United States) Rhyne Williams | 6 | 1 | 2

Final
3 | (United States) Michael Russell | 7 | 2 | 7^{7}
(Canada) Peter Polansky | 5 | 6 | 6^{5}

=== Top half ===
First round
1 | (United States) T Smyczek | 4 | 6 | 5
(India) S Myneni | 6 | 4 | 7
(United States) C Buchanan | 5 | 7^{7} | 7^{7}
(United States) A Krajicek | 7 | 6^{2} | 6^{3}
(Canada) F Peliwo | 6 | 6
(United States) B Fratangelo | 2 | 2
(Canada) J Levine | 7^{7} | 6
8 | (United States) S Johnson | 6^{4} | 4
3 | (United States) M Russell | 6 | 6
(Australia) J-P Smith | 3 | 2
(United States) T Sandgren | 6 | 6
Q | (France) Laurent Rochette | 2 | 3
WC | (United States) J Jenkins | 6 | 6
WC | (United States) M Styslinger | 3 | 3
(Greece) T Angelinos | 3 | 7^{7} | 6
6 | (United States) A Kuznetsov | 6 | 6^{3} | 4

Second round
(India) S Myneni | 6 | 6
(United States) C Buchanan | 4 | 4
(Canada) F Peliwo | 5 | 2
(Canada) J Levine | 7 | 6
3 | (United States) M Russell | 6 | 6
(United States) T Sandgren | 4 | 2
WC | (United States) J Jenkins | 6 | 7^{7}
(Greece) T Angelinos | 3 | 6^{2}

Quarterfinals
(India) S Myneni | 4 | 0
(Canada) J Levine | 6 | 6
3 | (United States) M Russell | 6 | 7^{7}
WC | (United States) J Jenkins | 3 | 6^{4}

Semifinals
(Canada) J Levine | 0 | 1^{r}
3 | (United States) M Russell | 6 | 3

=== Bottom half ===
First round
5 | (United States) R Ram | 7^{9} | 6
(Austria) M Neuchrist | 6^{7} | 3
WC | (United States) N Rubin | 3 | 6^{5}
(Canada) P Polansky | 6 | 7^{7}
WC | (United States) Mitchell Frank | 6 | 3 | 6
(South Africa) R de Voest | 4 | 6 | 3
Q | (United Kingdom) J Milton | 0 | 1
4 | (United States) D Young | 6 | 6
7 | (United States) R Williams | 6 | 7^{7}
Q | (United Kingdom) D Rice | 3 | 6^{4}
(Dominican Republic) J Hernández | 3 | 1
Q | (United States) K King | 6 | 6
(Germany) N Langer | 6 | 2 | 4
(Ukraine) D Molchanov | 4 | 6 | 6
(Australia) S Groth | 6 | 3 | 4
2 | (India) S Devvarman | 3 | 6 | 6

Second round
5 | (United States) R Ram | 5 | 6^{4}
(Canada) P Polansky | 7 | 7^{7}
WC | (United States) M Frank | 3 | 4
4 | (United States) D Young | 6 | 6
7 | (United States) R Williams | 6 | 6
Q | (United States) K King | 3 | 1
(Ukraine) D Molchanov | 2 | 3
2 | (India) S Devvarman | 6 | 6

Quarterfinals
(Canada) P Polansky | 6 | 3 | 6
4 | (United States) D Young | 4 | 6 | 2
7 | (United States) R Williams | 7^{7} | 6
2 | (India) S Devvarman | 6^{4} | 4

Semifinals
(Canada) P Polansky | 2 | 6 | 6
7 | (United States) R Williams | 6 | 1 | 2
