= 2012 Charlottesville Men's Pro Challenger – Doubles =

Doubles
- 2012 Charlottesville Men's Pro Challenger

Final
- Champions: (Australia) John Peers (Australia) John-Patrick Smith
- Runners-up: (United States) Jarmere Jenkins (United States) Jack Sock
- Score: 7–5, 6–1

Events
Singles	Doubles
← 2011 ·	Charlottesville Men's Pro Challenger	· 2013 →

Treat Conrad Huey and Dominic Inglot were the defending champions but Inglot decided not to participate.
Huey played alongside Bobby Reynolds.
John Peers and John-Patrick Smith defeated Jarmere Jenkins and Jack Sock 7–5, 6–1 in the final.

== Seeds ==
1. (Philippines) Treat Conrad Huey / (United States) Bobby Reynolds (quarterfinals)
2. (Australia) John Peers / (Australia) John-Patrick Smith (champion)
3. (Colombia) Robert Farah / (United States) Steve Johnson (first round)
4. (United States) Devin Britton / (United States) Austin Krajicek (quarterfinals)

== Draw ==
=== Key ===
- Q = Qualifier
- WC = Wild card
- LL = Lucky loser
- Alt = Alternate
- SE = Special exempt
- PR = Protected ranking
- ITF = ITF entry
- JE = Junior exempt
- w/o = Walkover
- r = Retired
- d = Defaulted
- SR = Special ranking

=== Draw ===
First round
1	(Philippines) TC Huey (United States) B Reynolds	6	6
WC	(United States) D Courtney (United States) Christian Harrison	1	3
(Romania) A Dăescu (Australia) A Hubble	6	3	[8]
WC	(United States) Jarmere Jenkins (United States) J Sock	3	6	[10]
4	(United States) D Britton (United States) A Krajicek	6	6
Q	(Australia) S Groth (United States) D Kosakowski	3	4
(Russia) A Bogomolov Jr. (United States) D Young	2	6	[10]
(United States) A Kuznetsov (Germany) M Zverev	6	4	[12]
(United States) D Kudla (United States) J Levine	6	6
(United Kingdom) D Rice (United Kingdom) S Thornley	4	4
(Australia) C Ball (Australia) C Guccione	5	6	[10]
3	(Colombia) R Farah (United States) S Johnson	7	3	[6]
WC	(United States) Brendan Evans (United States) Jarmaine Jenkins	5	4
(United States) T Smyczek (United States) R Sweeting	7	6
(United States) T Sandgren (United States) R Williams	7	6^{5}	[2]
2	(Australia) J Peers (Australia) J-P Smith	5	7^{7}	[10]

Quarterfinals
1	(Philippines) TC Huey (United States) B Reynolds	4	3
WC	(United States) J Jenkins (United States) J Sock	6	6
4	(United States) D Britton (United States) A Krajicek	6	4	[10]
(United States) A Kuznetsov (Germany) M Zverev	4	6	[12]
(United States) D Kudla (United States) J Levine	6	6
(Australia) C Ball (Australia) C Guccione	4	1
(United States) T Smyczek (United States) R Sweeting	3	4
2	(Australia) J Peers (Australia) J-P Smith	6	6

Semifinals
WC	(United States) J Jenkins (United States) J Sock	7^{7}	4	[10]
(United States) A Kuznetsov (Germany) M Zverev	6^{4}	6	[7]
(United States) D Kudla (United States) J Levine	3	3
2	(Australia) J Peers (Australia) J-P Smith	6	6

Final
WC	(United States) J Jenkins (United States) J Sock	5	1
2	(Australia) J Peers (Australia) J-P Smith	7	6
