= 2014 Charlottesville Men's Pro Challenger =

- Date: 27 October – 2 November
- Edition: 6th
- Draw: 32S/16D/32QS/4QD
- Prize money: $50,000
- Surface: Hard (indoor)
- Location: Charlottesville, United States

Champions

Singles
- (Australia) James Duckworth

Doubles
- (Philippines) Treat Huey / (Denmark) Frederik Nielsen
← 2013 ·	Charlottesville Men's Pro Challenger	· 2015 →

The 2014 Charlottesville Men's Pro Challenger was a professional tennis tournament played on indoor hard courts. It was the sixth edition of the tournament which was part of the 2014 ATP Challenger Tour, taking place in Charlottesville, United States from October 27 to November 2, 2014.

== Singles main-draw entrants ==
=== Seeds ===
Country	Player	Rank^{1}	Seed
AUS	Sam Groth	87	1
USA	Tim Smyczek	99	2
USA	Denis Kudla	128	3
USA	Michael Russell	129	4
POR	Gastão Elias	138	5
AUS	James Duckworth	140	6
USA	Rajeev Ram	142	7
CAN	Frank Dancevic	143	8

- ^{1} Rankings are as of October 20, 2014.

=== Other entrants ===
The following players received wildcards into the singles main draw:

- (United States) Ernesto Escobedo
- (United States) Mitchell Frank
- (United States) Stefan Kozlov
- (United States) Mac Styslinger

The following players received entry from the qualifying draw:

- (United States) Kevin King
- (France) Laurent Lokoli
- (United States) Daniel Nguyen
- (Denmark) Frederik Nielsen

== Champions ==
=== Singles ===
- (Australia) James Duckworth def. (United Kingdom) Liam Broady, 5-7 6-3 6-2

=== Doubles ===
- (Philippines) Treat Huey / (Denmark) Frederik Nielsen def. (United Kingdom) Lewis Burton / (United Kingdom) Marcus Willis, 3–6 6–3 [10–2]
