= 2017 Charlottesville Men's Pro Challenger – Doubles =

Doubles
- 2017 Charlottesville Men's Pro Challenger

Final
- Champions: (United States) Denis Kudla (United States) Danny Thomas
- Runners-up: (Australia) Jarryd Chaplin (Latvia) Miķelis Lībietis
- Score: 6–7^{(4–7)}, 1–4 ret.

Events
Singles	Doubles
← 2016 ·	Charlottesville Men's Pro Challenger	· 2018 →

Brian Baker and Sam Groth were the defending champions but chose not to defend their title.

Denis Kudla and Danny Thomas won the title after Jarryd Chaplin and Miķelis Lībietis retired leading 7–6^{(7–4)}, 4–1 in the final.

== Seeds ==
1. (India) Leander Paes / (India) Purav Raja (quarterfinals)
2. (United Kingdom) Luke Bambridge / (Republic of Ireland) David O'Hare (first round)
3. (South Africa) Ruan Roelofse / (United Kingdom) Joe Salisbury (quarterfinals)
4. (Australia) Jarryd Chaplin / (Latvia) Miķelis Lībietis (final, retired)

== Draw ==
=== Key ===
- Q = Qualifier
- WC = Wild card
- LL = Lucky loser
- Alt = Alternate
- SE = Special exempt
- PR = Protected ranking
- ITF = ITF entry
- JE = Junior exempt
- w/o = Walkover
- r = Retired
- d = Defaulted
- SR = Special ranking

First round
1	(India) L Paes (India) P Raja	6	6
(United States) C Eubanks (United States) M McDonald	4	0
(Venezuela) LD Martínez (Brazil) B Sant'Anna	4	7	[5]
WC	(United States) D Kudla (United States) D Thomas	6	5	[10]
3	(South Africa) R Roelofse (United Kingdom) J Salisbury	4	6	[10]
Q	(Slovakia) F Horanský (South Africa) N Scholtz	6	4	[6]
WC	(United States) T-S Kwiatkowski (Switzerland) A Ritschard	7	7
WC	(United States) Alexander Centenari (United States) JA Ore	5	5
(United Kingdom) L Broady (United States) B Fratangelo	4	5
(United States) M Giron (United States) T Smyczek	6	7
(United Kingdom) C Norrie (United States) T Paul	4	6^{8}
4	(Australia) Jarryd Chaplin (Latvia) M Lībietis	6	7^{10}
(United States) N Lammons (United States) A Lawson	6	6
(Canada) F Peliwo (Canada) B Schnur	4	2
(Mexico) H Hach Verdugo (United States) D Novikov	7^{7}	7^{7}
2	(United Kingdom) L Bambridge (Republic of Ireland) D O'Hare	6^{3}	6^{4}

Quarterfinals
1	(India) L Paes (India) P Raja	6^{2}	2
WC	(United States) D Kudla (United States) D Thomas	7^{7}	6
3	(South Africa) R Roelofse (United Kingdom) J Salisbury	3	6	[6]
WC	(United States) T-S Kwiatkowski (Switzerland) A Ritschard	6	3	[10]
(United States) M Giron (United States) T Smyczek	3	4
4	(Australia) J Chaplin (Latvia) M Lībietis	6	6
(United States) N Lammons (United States) A Lawson	6	1	[10]
(Mexico) H Hach Verdugo (United States) D Novikov	4	6	[4]

Semifinals
WC	(United States) D Kudla (United States) D Thomas	7	6
WC	(United States) T-S Kwiatkowski (Switzerland) A Ritschard	5	1
4	(Australia) J Chaplin (Latvia) M Lībietis	6	6^{3}	[12]
(United States) N Lammons (United States) A Lawson	3	7^{7}	[10]

Final
WC	(United States) D Kudla (United States) D Thomas	6^{4}	1
4	(Australia) J Chaplin (Latvia) M Lībietis	7^{7}	4^{r}
