= 2022 Charlottesville Men's Pro Challenger – Singles =

Singles
- 2022 Charlottesville Men's Pro Challenger

Final
- Champion: (United States) Ben Shelton
- Runner-up: (United States) Christopher Eubanks
- Score: 7–6^{(7–4)}, 7–5

Events
Singles	Doubles
- Charlottesville Men's Pro Challenger

Stefan Kozlov was the defending champion but lost in the second round to Lucas Gerch.

Ben Shelton won the title after defeating Christopher Eubanks 7–6^{(7–4)}, 7–5 in the final.

== Seeds ==
1. (United States) Denis Kudla (quarterfinals)
2. (United States) Michael Mmoh (second round)
3. (United States) Stefan Kozlov (second round)
4. (United States) Christopher Eubanks (final)
5. (Argentina) Juan Pablo Ficovich (first round)
6. (United States) Ben Shelton (champion)
7. (United States) Aleksandar Kovacevic (second round)
8. (United States) Emilio Nava (semifinals)

== Draw ==
Key

- Q = Qualifier
- WC = Wild card
- LL = Lucky loser
- Alt = Alternate
- ITF = ITF entry
- PR = Protected ranking
- SR = Special ranking
- SE = Special exempt
- JE = Junior exempt
- JR = Junior Accelerator Programme entrant
- CO = College Accelerator Programme entrant
- NG = Next Gen Accelerator Program entrant
- w/o = Walkover
- r = Retired
- d = Defaulted

=== Finals ===
Semifinals
8	(United States) Emilio Nava	5	6	3
4	(United States) Christopher Eubanks	7	4	6
6	(United States) Ben Shelton	7^{8}	3	7
(United Kingdom) Paul Jubb	6^{6}	6	5

Final
4	(United States) Christopher Eubanks	6^{4}	5
6	(United States) Ben Shelton	7^{7}	7

=== Top half ===
First round
1	(United States) D Kudla	6	6
(Germany) S Fanselow	4	3
Q	(United States) U Blanch	6	6
(Colombia) N Mejía	4	4
(Argentina) F Mena	3	6	7^{10}
Q	(United States) M Cassone	6	3	6^{8}
Q	(United States) Nathan Ponwith	7	2	3
8	(United States) Em Nava	5	6	6
4	(United States) C Eubanks	6	7^{7}
(Spain) N Álvarez Varona	1	6^{3}
Alt	(Tunisia) A Dougaz	3	6	6
(United States) Z Svajda	6	2	1
Q	(Israel) E Leshem	7	6
(Canada) A Galarneau	5	3
(China) J Shang	6	3	6
5	(Argentina) JP Ficovich	4	6	3

Second round
1	(United States) D Kudla	7^{7}	1	6
Q	(United States) U Blanch	6^{3}	6	2
(Argentina) F Mena	2	1
8	(United States) Em Nava	6	6
4	(United States) C Eubanks	7	7^{10}
Alt	(Tunisia) A Dougaz	5	6^{8}
Q	(Israel) E Leshem	6	3	2
(China) J Shang	1	6	6

Quarterfinals
1	(United States) D Kudla	2	1
8	(United States) Em Nava	6	6
4	(United States) C Eubanks	4	6	7^{10}
(China) J Shang	6	1	6^{8}

Semifinals
8	(United States) Em Nava	5	6	3
4	(United States) C Eubanks	7	4	6

=== Bottom half ===
First round
6	(United States) B Shelton	6	6
Q	(Luxembourg) C Rodesch	4	3
(United States) B Holt	6	3	6
SE	(United States) T Sandgren	1	6	2
Alt	(Germany) Lucas Gerch	6	6
WC	(United States) E Quinn	3	3
(United States) M Krueger	5	6	6^{1}
3	(United States) S Kozlov	7	0	7^{7}
7	(United States) A Kovacevic	6	7^{11}
(France) E Couacaud	3	6^{9}
WC	(United States) A Ayeni	2	2
WC	(Spain) I Montes de la Torre	6	6
Q	(United Kingdom) A McHugh	7^{7}	3	3
(United Kingdom) P Jubb	6^{4}	6	6
(United States) E Escobedo	6^{5}	5
2	(United States) M Mmoh	7^{7}	7

Second round
6	(United States) B Shelton	6	6
(United States) B Holt	3	4
Alt	(Germany) L Gerch	6	7^{7}
3	(United States) S Kozlov	4	6^{3}
7	(United States) A Kovacevic	6^{4}	4
WC	(Spain) I Montes de la Torre	7^{7}	6
(United Kingdom) P Jubb	7^{7}	6
2	(United States) M Mmoh	6^{4}	3

Quarterfinals
6	(United States) B Shelton	6	7
Alt	(Germany) L Gerch	3	5
WC	(Spain) I Montes de la Torre	3	2
(United Kingdom) P Jubb	6	6

Semifinals
6	(United States) B Shelton	7^{8}	3	7
(United Kingdom) P Jubb	6^{6}	6	5
