= 2022 Charlottesville Men's Pro Challenger – Doubles =

Doubles
- 2022 Charlottesville Men's Pro Challenger

Final
- Champions: (United Kingdom) Julian Cash (United Kingdom) Henry Patten
- Runners-up: (United States) Alex Lawson (New Zealand) Artem Sitak
- Score: 6–2, 6–4

Events
Singles	Doubles
← 2021 ·	Charlottesville Men's Pro Challenger	· 2023 →

William Blumberg and Max Schnur were the defending champions but chose to defend their title with different partners. Blumberg partnered Jackson Withrow but lost in the first round to Anirudh Chandrasekar and Vijay Sundar Prashanth. Schnur partnered Treat Huey but lost in the first round to Julian Cash and Henry Patten.

Cash and Patten won the title after defeating Alex Lawson and Artem Sitak 6–2, 6–4 in the final.

== Seeds ==
1. (United States) William Blumberg / (United States) Jackson Withrow (first round)
2. (Sweden) André Göransson / (Japan) Ben McLachlan (semifinals)
3. (Philippines) Treat Huey / (United States) Max Schnur (first round)
4. (United States) Robert Galloway / (Mexico) Hans Hach Verdugo (semifinals)

== Draw ==
=== Key ===
- Q = Qualifier
- WC = Wild card
- LL = Lucky loser
- Alt = Alternate
- SE = Special exempt
- PR = Protected ranking
- ITF = ITF entry
- JE = Junior exempt
- w/o = Walkover
- r = Retired
- d = Defaulted
- SR = Special ranking

First round
1	(United States) W Blumberg (United States) J Withrow	6	6^{4}	[7]
(India) A Chandrasekar (India) VS Prashanth	3	7^{7}	[10]
WC	(United States) Alexander Kiefer (Switzerland) Jeffrey von der Schulenburg	6	6^{5}	[6]
(United States) A Lawson (New Zealand) A Sitak	2	7^{7}	[10]
4	(United States) R Galloway (Mexico) H Hach Verdugo	7	6^{4}	[10]
(United States) Ezekiel Clark (United States) A Kovacevic	5	7^{7}	[7]
(United Kingdom) C Broom (Germany) C Frantzen	7^{7}	6^{5}	[8]
WC	(United States) U Blanch (United States) Em Nava	6^{2}	7^{7}	[10]
(France) T Arribagé (United Kingdom) L Johnson	6	6
(Argentina) JP Ficovich (Argentina) F Mena	2	0
(United Kingdom) J Cash (United Kingdom) H Patten	4	6	[10]
3	(Philippines) T Huey (United States) M Schnur	6	3	[8]
(United States) C Eubanks (United States) B Shelton	3	7^{8}	[9]
Alt	(France) E Couacaud (Israel) E Leshem	6	6^{6}	[11]
(United States) M Krueger (United States) H Reese	3	7^{7}	[6]
2	(Sweden) A Göransson (Japan) B McLachlan	6	6^{5}	[10]

Quarterfinals
(India) A Chandrasekar (India) VS Prashanth	7^{7}	6^{4}	[8]
(United States) A Lawson (New Zealand) A Sitak	6^{1}	7^{7}	[10]
4	(United States) R Galloway (Mexico) H Hach Verdugo	7^{7}	6
WC	(United States) U Blanch (United States) Em Nava	6^{5}	2
(France) T Arribagé (United Kingdom) L Johnson	7^{7}	6^{3}	[6]
(United Kingdom) J Cash (United Kingdom) H Patten	6^{5}	7^{7}	[10]
Alt	(France) E Couacaud (Israel) E Leshem	4	6	[3]
2	(Sweden) A Göransson (Japan) B McLachlan	6	3	[10]

Semifinals
(United States) A Lawson (New Zealand) A Sitak	7^{7}	7^{10}
4	(United States) R Galloway (Mexico) H Hach Verdugo	6^{3}	6^{8}
(United Kingdom) J Cash (United Kingdom) H Patten	7^{7}	7^{7}
2	(Sweden) A Göransson (Japan) B McLachlan	6^{4}	6^{5}

Final
(United States) A Lawson (New Zealand) A Sitak	2	4
(United Kingdom) J Cash (United Kingdom) H Patten	6	6
