= 2014 Charlottesville Men's Pro Challenger – Singles =

Singles
- 2014 Charlottesville Men's Pro Challenger

Final
- Champion: (Australia) James Duckworth
- Runner-up: (United Kingdom) Liam Broady
- Score: 5-7, 6-3, 6-2

Events
Singles	Doubles
← 2013 ·	Charlottesville Men's Pro Challenger	· 2015 →

James Duckworth defeated Liam Broady 5-7, 6-3, 6-2 in the final.

== Seeds ==
1. (Australia) Sam Groth (first round)
2. (United States) Tim Smyczek (first round)
3. (United States) Denis Kudla (semifinals)
4. (United States) Michael Russell (second round)
5. (Portugal) Gastão Elias (second round)
6. (Australia) James Duckworth (champion)
7. (United States) Rajeev Ram (first round)
8. (Canada) Frank Dancevic (second round)

== Draw ==
=== Key ===
- Q = Qualifier
- WC = Wild card
- LL = Lucky loser
- Alt = Alternate
- SE = Special exempt
- PR = Protected ranking
- ITF = ITF entry
- JE = Junior exempt
- w/o = Walkover
- r = Retired
- d = Defaulted
- SR = Special ranking

=== Finals ===
Semifinals
(United States) Alex Kuznetsov	4	6	4
6	(Australia) James Duckworth	6	3	6
3	(United States) Denis Kudla	5	0
(United Kingdom) Liam Broady	7	6

Final
6	(Australia) James Duckworth	5	6	6
(United Kingdom) Liam Broady	7	3	2

=== Top half ===
First round
1	(Australia) S Groth	4	4
Q	(France) L Lokoli	6	6
(France) G Mina	3	6	5
(United States) C Buchanan	6	3	7
(United States) R Ginepri	6^{3}	4
(United States) A Kuznetsov	7^{7}	6
(United States) R Williams	1	4
8	(Canada) F Dancevic	6	6
4	(United States) M Russell	6	6
(El Salvador) M Arévalo	2	1
(Japan) T Daniel	6	6
WC	(United States) M Styslinger	3	0
(United Kingdom) E Corrie	6	6
(Barbados) D King	4	6^{d}
WC	(United States) E Escobedo	6	3	4
6	(Australia) J Duckworth	1	6	6

Second round
Q	(France) L Lokoli	6	6
(United States) C Buchanan	0	0
(United States) A Kuznetsov	7^{7}	2	7^{7}
8	(Canada) F Dancevic	6^{2}	6	6^{4}
4	(United States) M Russell	4	2
(Japan) T Daniel	6	6
(United Kingdom) E Corrie	6	4	1
6	(Australia) J Duckworth	2	6	6

Quarterfinals
Q	(France) L Lokoli	6	4	3
(United States) A Kuznetsov	3	6	6
(Japan) T Daniel	1	2
6	(Australia) J Duckworth	6	6

Semifinals
(United States) A Kuznetsov	4	6	4
6	(Australia) J Duckworth	6	3	6

=== Bottom half ===
First round
5	(Portugal) G Elias	6	6
Q	(United States) K King	4	4
(United States) T Sandgren	6	6
(Republic of Ireland) J McGee	3	1
(Brazil) Henrique Cunha	3	3
Q	(Denmark) F Nielsen	6	6
(United States) W Odesnik	3	2
3	(United States) D Kudla	6	6
7	(United States) R Ram	3	3
Q	(United States) D Nguyen	6	6
(United States) R Harrison	6	6
WC	(United States) Mitchell Frank	4	1
(Germany) P Torebko	6	7^{7}
WC	(United States) S Kozlov	3	6^{2}
(United Kingdom) L Broady	4	6	6
2	(United States) T Smyczek	6	2	4

Second round
5	(Portugal) G Elias	4	3
(United States) T Sandgren	6	6
Q	(Denmark) F Nielsen	1	6	3
3	(United States) D Kudla	6	3	6
Q	(United States) D Nguyen	1	4
(United States) R Harrison	6	6
(Germany) P Torebko	0	3
(United Kingdom) L Broady	6	6

Quarterfinals
(United States) T Sandgren	6	5	2
3	(United States) D Kudla	2	7	6
(United States) R Harrison	7^{7}	6^{4}	3
(United Kingdom) L Broady	6^{2}	7^{7}	6

Semifinals
3	(United States) D Kudla	5	0
(United Kingdom) L Broady	7	6
