= 2025 Charlottesville Men's Pro Challenger – Singles =

Singles
- 2025 Charlottesville Men's Pro Challenger

Final
- Champion: (Spain) Rafael Jódar
- Runner-up: (United States) Martin Damm
- Score: 6–3, 7–6^{(7–2)}

Events
Singles	Doubles
- Charlottesville Men's Pro Challenger

James Trotter was the defending champion but chose not to defend his title.

Rafael Jódar won the title after defeating Martin Damm 6–3, 7–6^{(7–2)} in the final.

== Seeds ==
1. (Australia) Rinky Hijikata (second round)
2. (Canada) Liam Draxl (first round)
3. (United States) Patrick Kypson (first round)
4. (United Kingdom) Jay Clarke (second round)
5. (Colombia) Nicolás Mejía (first round)
6. (United States) Martin Damm (final)
7. (Spain) Rafael Jódar (champion)
8. (United Kingdom) Johannus Monday (semifinals, retired)

== Draw ==
Key

- Q = Qualifier
- WC = Wild card
- LL = Lucky loser
- Alt = Alternate
- ITF = ITF entry
- PR = Protected ranking
- SR = Special ranking
- SE = Special exempt
- JE = Junior exempt
- JR = Junior Accelerator Programme entrant
- CO = College Accelerator Programme entrant
- NG = Next Gen Accelerator Program entrant
- w/o = Walkover
- r = Retired
- d = Defaulted

=== Finals ===
Semifinals
(Germany) Mats Rosenkranz	6^{3}	4
6	(United States) Martin Damm	7^{7}	6
7	(Spain) Rafael Jódar	6	4
8	(United Kingdom) Johannus Monday	4	2^{r}

Final
6	(United States) Martin Damm	3	6^{2}
7	(Spain) Rafael Jódar	6	7^{7}

=== Top half ===
First round
1	(Australia) R Hijikata	4	7	6
(Chile) M Soto	6	5	3
(United States) A Martin	4	6	3
(Germany) M Rosenkranz	6	4	6
Alt	(Spain) I Montes de la Torre	5	7^{7}	6
WC	(United States) Andre Ilagan	7	6^{1}	4
CO	(United Kingdom) O Tarvet	6	6
5	(Colombia) N Mejía	4	2
3	(United States) P Kypson	3	3
(Estonia) D Glinka	6	6
PR	(United States) T-S Kwiatkowski	5	3
(Germany) P Zahraj	7	6
NG	(United States) Dar Blanch	6	3	2
Q	(United States) K Smith	4	6	6
Alt	(United Kingdom) C Broom	3	3
6	(United States) M Damm	6	6

Second round
1	(Australia) R Hijikata	3	4
(Germany) M Rosenkranz	6	6
Alt	(Spain) I Montes de la Torre	7	4	6^{3}
CO	(United Kingdom) O Tarvet	5	6	7^{7}
(Estonia) D Glinka	7^{7}	6
(Germany) P Zahraj	6^{4}	2
Q	(United States) K Smith	1	5
6	(United States) M Damm	6	7

Quarterfinals
(Germany) M Rosenkranz	6	6
CO	(United Kingdom) O Tarvet	1	0
(Estonia) D Glinka	7^{7}	4	4
6	(United States) M Damm	6^{3}	6	6

Semifinals
(Germany) M Rosenkranz	6^{3}	4
6	(United States) M Damm	7^{7}	6

=== Bottom half ===
First round
7	(Spain) R Jódar	6	7
(United States) M Cassone	4	5
Q	(Germany) M Wiskandt	5	6^{4}
(Georgia (country)) S Purtseladze	7	7^{7}
WC	(Switzerland) D Dietrich	6	6
(United States) A Perez	3	4
Alt	(United States) T Zink	2	4
4	(United Kingdom) J Clarke	6	6
8	(United Kingdom) J Monday	6	7
WC	(United States) Ronit Karki	3	5
Q	(United States) C Kingsley	6	6
Q	(Canada) J Boulais	3	3
Q	(Poland) M Kaśnikowski	4	7^{7}	6^{5}
(United States) M Krueger	6	6^{5}	7^{7}
Q	(India) D Suresh	6	6
2	(Canada) L Draxl	3	3

Second round
7	(Spain) R Jódar	6	6
(Georgia (country)) S Purtseladze	4	0
WC	(Switzerland) D Dietrich	7^{8}	6
4	(United Kingdom) J Clarke	6^{6}	2
8	(United Kingdom) J Monday	6	6^{1}	6
Q	(United States) C Kingsley	4	7^{7}	1
(United States) M Krueger	7^{7}	4	6
Q	(India) D Suresh	6^{5}	6	3

Quarterfinals
7	(Spain) R Jódar	7	6
WC	(Switzerland) D Dietrich	5	3
8	(United Kingdom) J Monday	6	6
(United States) M Krueger	4	4

Semifinals
7	(Spain) R Jódar	6	4
8	(United Kingdom) J Monday	4	2^{r}
