= 2025 Charlottesville Men's Pro Challenger – Doubles =

Doubles
- 2025 Charlottesville Men's Pro Challenger

Final
- Champions: (Germany) Tim Rühl (Germany) Patrick Zahraj
- Runners-up: (Canada) Justin Boulais (United States) Mac Kiger
- Score: 3–6, 7–5, [12–10]

Events
Singles	Doubles
- Charlottesville Men's Pro Challenger

Robert Cash and JJ Tracy were the defending champions but chose not to defend their title.

Tim Rühl and Patrick Zahraj won the title after defeating Justin Boulais and Mac Kiger 3–6, 7–5, [12–10] in the final.

== Seeds ==
1. (Canada) Cleeve Harper / (United Kingdom) David Stevenson (semifinals)
2. (India) Anirudh Chandrasekar / (United States) Reese Stalder (semifinals)
3. (India) Siddhant Banthia / (Chile) Matías Soto (first round)
4. (United States) Benjamin Kittay / (United States) Joshua Sheehy (first round, withdrew)

== Draw ==
Key

- Q = Qualifier
- WC = Wild card
- LL = Lucky loser
- Alt = Alternate
- ITF = ITF entry
- PR = Protected ranking
- SR = Special ranking
- SE = Special exempt
- JE = Junior exempt
- JR = Junior Accelerator Programme entrant
- CO = College Accelerator Programme entrant
- NG = Next Gen Accelerator Program entrant
- w/o = Walkover
- r = Retired
- d = Defaulted

=== Draw ===
First round
1	(Canada) C Harper (United Kingdom) D Stevenson	6	6
(Canada) L Draxl (United States) N Schachter	3	4
(United States) M Krueger (Antigua and Barbuda) J Maginley	6	2	[5]
WC	(United States) Zachary Fuchs (United States) Wally Thayne	3	6	[10]
3	(India) S Banthia (Chile) M Soto	7^{7}	3	[5]
(Canada) J Boulais (United States) M Kiger	6^{5}	6	[10]
(United States) A Perez (United States) Jamie Vance	1	6	[10]
(Germany) M Rosenkranz (Germany) M Wiskandt	6	3	[8]
(United Kingdom) C Broom (United Kingdom) M Whitehouse	6	6
(Australia) P Harper (United States) T Zink	4	4
(Germany) T Rühl (Germany) P Zahraj	w/o
4	(United States) B Kittay (United States) J Sheehy
(United Kingdom) J Clarke (United Kingdom) T Hands	7	7
(United States) Andre Ilagan (United States) P Kumar	5	5
WC	(United Kingdom) James Hopper (Spain) I Montes de la Torre	4	5
2	(India) A Chandrasekar (United States) R Stalder	6	7

Quarterfinals
1	(Canada) C Harper (United Kingdom) D Stevenson	6	6
WC	(United States) Z Fuchs (United States) W Thayne	4	1
(Canada) J Boulais (United States) M Kiger	6	6
(United States) A Perez (United States) Jam Vance	3	1
(United Kingdom) C Broom (United Kingdom) M Whitehouse	6	1	[9]
(Germany) T Rühl (Germany) P Zahraj	3	6	[11]
(United Kingdom) J Clarke (United Kingdom) T Hands	3	2
2	(India) A Chandrasekar (United States) R Stalder	6	6

Semifinals
1	(Canada) C Harper (United Kingdom) D Stevenson	4	5
(Canada) J Boulais (United States) M Kiger	6	7
(Germany) T Rühl (Germany) P Zahraj	1	7^{7}	[11]
2	(India) A Chandrasekar (United States) R Stalder	6	6^{5}	[9]

Final
(Canada) J Boulais (United States) M Kiger	6	5	[10]
(Germany) T Rühl (Germany) P Zahraj	3	7	[12]
