= 2024 Charlottesville Men's Pro Challenger – Singles =

Singles
- 2024 Charlottesville Men's Pro Challenger

Final
- Champion: (Japan) James Trotter
- Runner-up: (United States) Nishesh Basavareddy
- Score: 6–3, 6–4

Events
Singles	Doubles
- Charlottesville Men's Pro Challenger

Beibit Zhukayev was the defending champion but lost in the first round to Learner Tien.

James Trotter won the title after defeating Nishesh Basavareddy 6–3, 6–4 in the final.

== Seeds ==
1. (United States) Christopher Eubanks (first round)
2. (United States) Learner Tien (semifinals)
3. (United States) Mitchell Krueger (first round)
4. (United States) Zachary Svajda (first round)
5. (Poland) Maks Kaśnikowski (second round)
6. (United States) Patrick Kypson (second round)
7. (Kazakhstan) Dmitry Popko (first round)
8. (United Kingdom) Paul Jubb (second round)

== Draw ==
Key

- Q = Qualifier
- WC = Wild card
- LL = Lucky loser
- Alt = Alternate
- ITF = ITF entry
- PR = Protected ranking
- SR = Special ranking
- SE = Special exempt
- JE = Junior exempt
- JR = Junior Accelerator Programme entrant
- CO = College Accelerator Programme entrant
- NG = Next Gen Accelerator Program entrant
- w/o = Walkover
- r = Retired
- d = Defaulted

=== Finals ===
Semifinals
(United States) Nishesh Basavareddy	6	6
(Canada) Alexis Galarneau	4	2
(Japan) James Trotter	6	3	6
2	(United States) Learner Tien	3	6	2

Final
(United States) Nishesh Basavareddy	3	4
(Japan) James Trotter	6	6

=== Top half ===
First round
1	(United States) C Eubanks	1	6^{7}
Q	(Germany) P Zahraj	6	7^{9}
(United States) N Basavareddy	6	6
(United States) E Spizzirri	4	3
LL	(Luxembourg) C Rodesch	6	6
WC	(United States) G Nanda	4	3
Q	(United States) T Kodat	4	2
8	(United Kingdom) P Jubb	6	6
4	(United States) Z Svajda	3	3
WC	(Switzerland) D Dietrich	6	6
Q	(Japan) N Nakagawa	4	1
(Canada) A Galarneau	6	6
(France) E Couacaud	1	6^{7}
(United States) E Quinn	6	7^{9}
Q	(United Kingdom) K Edmund	6	4	2
5	(Poland) M Kaśnikowski	4	6	6

Second round
Q	(Germany) P Zahraj	2	0
(United States) N Basavareddy	6	6
LL	(Luxembourg) C Rodesch	6^{7}	7	6
8	(United Kingdom) P Jubb	7^{9}	5	4
WC	(Switzerland) D Dietrich	2	6^{5}
(Canada) A Galarneau	6	7^{7}
(United States) E Quinn	7	6
5	(Poland) M Kaśnikowski	5	0

Quarterfinals
(United States) N Basavareddy	6	6^{6}	7^{7}
LL	(Luxembourg) C Rodesch	4	7^{8}	6^{5}
(Canada) A Galarneau	6	6
(United States) E Quinn	3	2

Semifinals
(United States) N Basavareddy	6	6
(Canada) A Galarneau	4	2

=== Bottom half ===
First round
7	(Kazakhstan) D Popko	7	1	6^{1}
WC	(United States) R Opelka	5	6	7^{7}
Q	(United States) Andre Ilagan	3	5
SE	(United States) C Smith	6	7
Q	(United States) A Rybakov	5	4
(United States) B Holt	7	6
(Japan) J Trotter	7	7^{8}
3	(United States) M Krueger	5	6^{6}
6	(United States) P Kypson	6	6
(Australia) B Tomic	3	0
(United Kingdom) H Searle	3	3
(Estonia) M Lajal	6	6
(Colombia) N Mejía	0	6	7
(United States) D Kudla	6	3	5
(Kazakhstan) B Zhukayev	6	4	2
2	(United States) L Tien	2	6	6

Second round
WC	(United States) R Opelka	7^{7}	4	4
SE	(United States) C Smith	6^{5}	6	6
(United States) B Holt	2	3
(Japan) J Trotter	6	6
6	(United States) P Kypson	6^{4}	3
(Estonia) M Lajal	7^{7}	6
(Colombia) N Mejía	4	6^{8}
2	(United States) L Tien	6	7^{10}

Quarterfinals
SE	(United States) C Smith	6^{4}	6	6^{4}
(Japan) J Trotter	7^{7}	2	7^{7}
(Estonia) M Lajal	6	1	4
2	(United States) L Tien	3	6	6

Semifinals
(Japan) J Trotter	6	3	6
2	(United States) L Tien	3	6	2
