= 2024 Charlottesville Men's Pro Challenger =

- Date: 28 October – 3 November
- Edition: 15th
- Surface: Hard (indoor)
- Location: Charlottesville, United States

Champions

Singles
- (Japan) James Trotter

Doubles
- (United States) Robert Cash / (United States) JJ Tracy
- Charlottesville Men's Pro Challenger

The 2024 Jonathan Fried Pro Challenger was a professional tennis tournament played on indoor hardcourts. It was the 15th edition of the tournament which was part of the 2024 ATP Challenger Tour, taking place in Charlottesville, United States from October 28 and November 3, 2024.

== Singles main-draw entrants ==
=== Seeds ===
Country	Player	Rank^{1}	Seed
USA	Christopher Eubanks	119	1
USA	Learner Tien	124	2
USA	Mitchell Krueger	146	3
USA	Zachary Svajda	163	4
POL	Maks Kaśnikowski	168	5
USA	Patrick Kypson	173	6
KAZ	Dmitry Popko	175	7
GBR	Paul Jubb	182	8

- ^{1} Rankings are as of 21 October 2024.

=== Other entrants ===
The following players received wildcards into the singles main draw:

- (Switzerland) Dylan Dietrich
- (United States) Govind Nanda
- (United States) Reilly Opelka

The following players received entry into the singles main draw as special exempts:

- (Croatia) ~~Borna Gojo~~
- (United States) Colton Smith

The following players received entry from the qualifying draw:

- (United Kingdom) Kyle Edmund
- (United States) Andre Ilagan
- (United States) Toby Kodat
- (Japan) Naoki Nakagawa
- (United States) Alex Rybakov
- (Germany) Patrick Zahraj

The following player received entry as a lucky loser:

- (Luxembourg) Chris Rodesch

== Champions ==
=== Singles ===
- (Japan) James Trotter def. (United States) Nishesh Basavareddy 6–3, 6–4.

=== Doubles ===
- (United States) Robert Cash / (United States) JJ Tracy def. (Luxembourg) Chris Rodesch / (United States) William Woodall 4–6, 7–6^{(9–7)}, [10–7].
