= 2022 Charlottesville Men's Pro Challenger =

- Date: 31 October – 6 November
- Edition: 13th
- Surface: Hard (indoor)
- Location: Charlottesville, United States

Champions

Singles
- (United States) Ben Shelton

Doubles
- (United Kingdom) Julian Cash / (United Kingdom) Henry Patten
- Charlottesville Men's Pro Challenger

The 2022 Jonathan Fried Pro Challenger was a professional tennis tournament played on indoor hardcourts. It was the 13th edition of the tournament which was part of the 2022 ATP Challenger Tour, taking place in Charlottesville, United States from October 31 and November 6, 2022.

== Singles main-draw entrants ==
=== Seeds ===
Country	Player	Rank^{1}	Seed
USA	Denis Kudla	102	1
USA	Michael Mmoh	111	2
USA	Stefan Kozlov	133	3
USA	Christopher Eubanks	137	4
ARG	Juan Pablo Ficovich	148	5
USA	Ben Shelton	158	6
USA	Aleksandar Kovacevic	165	7
USA	Emilio Nava	173	8

- ^{1} Rankings are as of 24 October 2022.

=== Other entrants ===
The following players received wildcards into the singles main draw:

- (United States) Alafia Ayeni
- (Spain) Iñaki Montes de la Torre
- (United States) Ethan Quinn

The following player received entry into the singles main draw as a special exempt:

- (United States) Tennys Sandgren

The following players received entry into the singles main draw as alternates:

- (Tunisia) Aziz Dougaz
- (Germany) Lucas Gerch

The following players received entry from the qualifying draw:

- (United States) Ulises Blanch
- (United States) Murphy Cassone
- (Israel) Edan Leshem
- (United Kingdom) Aidan McHugh
- (United States) Nathan Ponwith
- (Luxembourg) Chris Rodesch

== Champions ==
=== Singles ===
- (United States) Ben Shelton def. (United States) Christopher Eubanks 7–6^{(7–4)}, 7–5.

=== Doubles ===
- (United Kingdom) Julian Cash / (United Kingdom) Henry Patten def. (United States) Alex Lawson / (New Zealand) Artem Sitak 6–2, 6–4.
