= 2019 Charlottesville Men's Pro Challenger – Doubles =

Doubles
- 2019 Charlottesville Men's Pro Challenger

Final
- Champions: (United States) Mitchell Krueger (Slovenia) Blaž Rola
- Runners-up: (United States) Sekou Bangoura (Slovenia) Blaž Kavčič
- Score: 6–4, 6–1

Events
Singles	Doubles
- Charlottesville Men's Pro Challenger

Harri Heliövaara and Henri Laaksonen were the defending champions but chose not to defend their title.

Mitchell Krueger and Blaž Rola won the title after defeating Sekou Bangoura and Blaž Kavčič 6–4, 6–1 in the final.

== Seeds ==
1. (United States) Robert Galloway / (Venezuela) Roberto Maytín (first round)
2. (Philippines) Treat Huey / (United States) Jackson Withrow (first round)
3. (United States) JC Aragone / (United States) Hunter Reese (quarterfinals)
4. (Mexico) Hans Hach Verdugo / (United States) Dennis Novikov (quarterfinals)

== Draw ==
Key

- Q = Qualifier
- WC = Wild card
- LL = Lucky loser
- Alt = Alternate
- ITF = ITF entry
- PR = Protected ranking
- SR = Special ranking
- SE = Special exempt
- JE = Junior exempt
- JR = Junior Accelerator Programme entrant
- CO = College Accelerator Programme entrant
- NG = Next Gen Accelerator Program entrant
- w/o = Walkover
- r = Retired
- d = Defaulted

First round
1	(United States) R Galloway (Venezuela) R Maytín	6^{9}	6^{5}
PR	(United States) S Bangoura (Slovenia) B Kavčič	7^{11}	7^{7}
(United States) N Pasha (United States) M Schnur	7	4	[8]
(United Kingdom) E Hoyt (France) M Janvier	5	6	[10]
4	(Mexico) H Hach Verdugo (United States) D Novikov	6	6
(Kazakhstan) D Popko (Russia) A Vatutin	2	3
(United States) Ma Redlicki (Sweden) A Siljeström	6	3	[10]
WC	(United States) B Nakashima (Sweden) C Söderlund	3	6	[3]
(United States) M Giron (United States) A Lawson	6^{5}	5
WC	(United States) S Korda (United States) P Kypson	7^{7}	7
WC	(United States) Ryan Goetz (United States) Matthew Lord	6^{6}	5
3	(United States) JC Aragone (United States) H Reese	7^{8}	7
(United Kingdom) L Glasspool (United Kingdom) D Inglot	4	7^{7}	[16]
(Canada) P Polansky (Canada) B Schnur	6	6^{5}	[14]
(United States) M Krueger (Slovenia) B Rola	7^{7}	5	[10]
2	(Philippines) T Huey (United States) J Withrow	6^{5}	7	[2]

Quarterfinals
PR	(United States) S Bangoura (Slovenia) B Kavčič	6	6
(United Kingdom) E Hoyt (France) M Janvier	4	4
4	(Mexico) H Hach Verdugo (United States) D Novikov	3	7	[7]
(United States) Ma Redlicki (Sweden) A Siljeström	6	5	[10]
WC	(United States) S Korda (United States) P Kypson	6	6
3	(United States) JC Aragone (United States) H Reese	4	4
(United Kingdom) L Glasspool (United Kingdom) D Inglot	2	3
(United States) M Krueger (Slovenia) B Rola	6	6

Semifinals
PR	(United States) S Bangoura (Slovenia) B Kavčič	6	4	[10]
(United States) Ma Redlicki (Sweden) A Siljeström	4	6	[6]
WC	(United States) S Korda (United States) P Kypson	2	1
(United States) M Krueger (Slovenia) B Rola	6	6

Final
PR	(United States) S Bangoura (Slovenia) B Kavčič	4	1
(United States) M Krueger (Slovenia) B Rola	6	6
