= 2009 Virginia National Bank Men's Pro Championship =

2009 Charlottesville Men's Pro Challenger
- Date: 2–8 November
- Edition: 1st
- Surface: Hard (indoor)
- Location: Charlottesville, Virginia, USA

Champions

Singles
- (United States) Kevin Kim

Doubles
- (Germany) Martin Emmrich / (Sweden) Andreas Siljeström
- Charlottesville Men's Pro Challenger

The 2009 Virginia National Bank Men's Pro Championship was a professional tennis tournament played on indoor hard courts. It was the first edition of the tournament which was part of the 2009 ATP Challenger Tour. It took place in Charlottesville, Virginia, USA between 2 and 8 November 2009.

== ATP entrants ==
=== Seeds ===
Country	Player	Rank^{1}	Seed
USA	Michael Russell	85	1
USA	Kevin Kim	87	2
IND	Somdev Devvarman	121	3
RSA	Kevin Anderson	123	4
USA	Ryan Sweeting	141	5
SLO	Grega Žemlja	156	6
CRO	Roko Karanušić	161	7
USA	Jesse Witten	167	8

- Rankings are as of October 26, 2009.

=== Other entrants ===
The following players received wildcards into the singles main draw:

- (Philippines) Treat Conrad Huey
- (United Kingdom) Dominic Inglot
- (Hungary) Dénes Lukács
- (United States) Ryan Sweeting

The following player received a Special Exempt into the singles main draw:

- (Argentina) Gastón Gaudio

The following players received entry from the qualifying draw:

- (United States) Cory Parr
- (United States) Todd Paul
- (India) Sanam Singh
- (South Africa) Fritz Wolmarans

== Champions ==
=== Singles ===
(United States) Kevin Kim def. (India) Somdev Devvarman, 6–4, 6–7(8), 6–4

=== Doubles ===
(Germany) Martin Emmrich / (Sweden) Andreas Siljeström def. (United Kingdom) Dominic Inglot / (United States) Rylan Rizza, 6–3, 6–2
