= 2014 Charlottesville Men's Pro Challenger – Doubles =

Doubles
- 2014 Charlottesville Men's Pro Challenger

Final
- Champion: (Philippines) Treat Huey (Denmark) Frederik Nielsen
- Runner-up: (United Kingdom) Lewis Burton (United Kingdom) Marcus Willis
- Score: 3-6, 6-3, [10-2]

Events
Singles	Doubles
- Charlottesville Men's Pro Challenger

Treat Huey and Frederik Nielsen won the 2014 edition, defeating Lewis Burton and Marcus Willis 3–6, 6–3, [10-2].

== Seeds ==
1. (Philippines) Treat Huey / (Denmark) Frederik Nielsen (champions)
2. (Brazil) Marcelo Demoliner / (Venezuela) Roberto Maytín (quarterfinals)
3. (United States) Kevin King / (Colombia) Juan-Carlos Spir (first round)
4. (United States) Chase Buchanan / (United States) Tennys Sandgren (first round)

== Draw ==
Key

- Q = Qualifier
- WC = Wild card
- LL = Lucky loser
- Alt = Alternate
- ITF = ITF entry
- PR = Protected ranking
- SR = Special ranking
- SE = Special exempt
- JE = Junior exempt
- JR = Junior Accelerator Programme entrant
- CO = College Accelerator Programme entrant
- NG = Next Gen Accelerator Program entrant
- w/o = Walkover
- r = Retired
- d = Defaulted

=== Main draw ===
First round
1	(Philippines) T Huey (Denmark) F Nielsen	6	7
WC	(United States) S Kozlov (United States) R Ram	2	5
(United Kingdom) L Broady (Japan) T Daniel	1	6	[6]
WC	(United States) T-S Kwiatkowski (United States) M Styslinger	6	4	[10]
3	(United States) K King (Colombia) J-C Spir	6^{5}	6	[8]
(Australia) J Duckworth (Republic of Ireland) J McGee	7^{7}	4	[10]
WC	(United States) Luca Corinteli (United States) D Kudla	6	3	[11]
(United States) S Bangoura (United States) E King	3	6	[13]
(United States) W Odesnik (Germany) P Torebko	2	1
(Canada) F Dancevic (Mexico) M Á Reyes-Varela	6	6
(Portugal) G Elias (United Kingdom) S Thornley	7^{7}	6
4	(United States) C Buchanan (United States) T Sandgren	6^{5}	4
(United Kingdom) E Corrie (United States) A Kuznetsov	6^{5}	7^{7}	[6]
(United Kingdom) L Burton (United Kingdom) M Willis	7^{7}	6^{2}	[10]
Q	(Australia) C Ball (United States) R Harrison	3	6^{4}
2	(Brazil) M Demoliner (Venezuela) R Maytín	6	7^{7}

Quarterfinals
1	(Philippines) T Huey (Denmark) F Nielsen	2	6	[10]
WC	(United States) T-S Kwiatkowski (United States) M Styslinger	6	0	[3]
(Australia) J Duckworth (Republic of Ireland) J McGee	6^{4}	1
(United States) S Bangoura (United States) E King	7^{7}	6
(Canada) F Dancevic (Mexico) M Á Reyes-Varela	6^{5}	3
(Portugal) G Elias (United Kingdom) S Thornley	7^{7}	6
(United Kingdom) L Burton (United Kingdom) M Willis	6	3	[10]
2	(Brazil) M Demoliner (Venezuela) R Maytín	2	6	[8]

Semifinals
1	(Philippines) T Huey (Denmark) F Nielsen	6	7^{7}
(United States) S Bangoura (United States) E King	3	6^{2}
(Portugal) G Elias (United Kingdom) S Thornley	6^{9}	7^{7}	[6]
(United Kingdom) L Burton (United Kingdom) M Willis	7^{11}	6^{2}	[10]

Final
1	(Philippines) T Huey (Denmark) F Nielsen	3	6	[10]
(United Kingdom) L Burton (United Kingdom) M Willis	6	3	[2]
