= 2019 Charlottesville Men's Pro Challenger – Singles =

Singles
- 2019 Charlottesville Men's Pro Challenger

Final
- Champion: (Canada) Vasek Pospisil
- Runner-up: (Canada) Brayden Schnur
- Score: 7–6^{(7–2)}, 3–6, 6–2

Events
Singles	Doubles
- Charlottesville Men's Pro Challenger

Tommy Paul was the defending champion but chose not to defend his title.

Vasek Pospisil won the title after defeating Brayden Schnur 7–6^{(7–2)}, 3–6, 6–2 in the final.

== Seeds ==
All seeds receive a bye into the second round.

1. (Canada) Brayden Schnur (final)
2. (Croatia) Ivo Karlović (second round)
3. (United States) Denis Kudla (third round)
4. (Japan) Taro Daniel (quarterfinals)
5. (United States) Marcos Giron (quarterfinals)
6. (Slovenia) Blaž Rola (quarterfinals)
7. (Australia) Christopher O'Connell (third round)
8. (Canada) Peter Polansky (second round)
9. (Barbados) Darian King (third round)
10. (Canada) Vasek Pospisil (champion)
11. (Denmark) Mikael Torpegaard (withdrew)
12. (France) Maxime Janvier (third round)
13. (United States) Thai-Son Kwiatkowski (withdrew)
14. (Russia) Alexey Vatutin (second round)
15. (United States) Mitchell Krueger (third round)
16. (Kazakhstan) Dmitry Popko (semifinals)

== Draw ==
Key

- Q = Qualifier
- WC = Wild card
- LL = Lucky loser
- Alt = Alternate
- ITF = ITF entry
- PR = Protected ranking
- SR = Special ranking
- SE = Special exempt
- JE = Junior exempt
- JR = Junior Accelerator Programme entrant
- CO = College Accelerator Programme entrant
- NG = Next Gen Accelerator Program entrant
- w/o = Walkover
- r = Retired
- d = Defaulted

=== Finals ===
Quarterfinals
1	(Canada) Brayden Schnur	6	7^{7}
6	(Slovenia) Blaž Rola	2	6^{4}
16	(Kazakhstan) Dmitry Popko	6	6
5	(United States) Marcos Giron	3	4
WC	(United States) Brandon Nakashima	6^{7}	6	6
4	(Japan) Taro Daniel	7^{9}	1	3
10	(Canada) Vasek Pospisil	6	6
(Canada) Filip Peliwo	1	2

Semifinals
1	(Canada) Brayden Schnur	3	6	6
16	(Kazakhstan) Dmitry Popko	6	1	4
WC	(United States) Brandon Nakashima	1	1
10	(Canada) Vasek Pospisil	6	6

Final
1	(Canada) Brayden Schnur	6^{2}	6	2
10	(Canada) Vasek Pospisil	7^{7}	3	6

=== Top half ===
==== Section 1 ====
First round
Alt	(United States) Evan Song	7	7
(United States) Mi Redlicki	5	5
(United States) J Sock	3	0^{r}
(United States) S Bangoura	6	0
(United States) Roy Smith	4	5
Q	(Italy) L Caruana	6	7
WC	(United States) R Sarmiento	6	6
(United Kingdom) L Broady	4	2

Second round
1	(Canada) B Schnur	3	6	6
Alt	(United States) E Song	6	1	4
(United States) S Bangoura	5	6	6
14	(Russia) A Vatutin	7	2	4
Alt	(United States) Gianni Ross	6^{4}	1
Q	(Italy) L Caruana	7^{7}	6
WC	(United States) R Sarmiento	5	2
6	(Slovenia) B Rola	7	6

Third round
1	(Canada) B Schnur	7^{7}	6
(United States) S Bangoura	6^{5}	2
Q	(Italy) L Caruana	3	2
6	(Slovenia) B Rola	6	6

Quarterfinals
1	(Canada) B Schnur	6	7^{7}
6	(Slovenia) B Rola	2	6^{4}

==== Section 2 ====
First round
(United States) JC Aragone	6	6
(Dominican Republic) R Cid Subervi	2	3
(United States) J. J. Wolf	6	6
WC	(United States) G Nanda	0	1
(United States) M Mmoh	7^{7}	7^{7}
WC	(United States) A Rybakov	6^{3}	6^{2}
(United States) K King	6	6
Q	(United States) Jacob Dunbar	3	4

Second round
3	(United States) D Kudla	6	6
(United States) JC Aragone	4	4
(United States) J. J. Wolf	6	4	3
16	(Kazakhstan) D Popko	4	6	6
9	(Barbados) D King	6	4
(United States) M Mmoh	3	1^{d}
(United States) K King	6	2	4
5	(United States) M Giron	4	6	6

Third round
3	(United States) D Kudla	6	6^{5}	1
16	(Kazakhstan) D Popko	4	7^{7}	6
9	(Barbados) D King	4	6	6^{5}
5	(United States) M Giron	6	3	7^{7}

Quarterfinals
16	(Kazakhstan) D Popko	6	6
5	(United States) M Giron	3	4

=== Bottom half ===
==== Section 3 ====
First round
(United States) E Escobedo	3	6^{4}
WC	(United States) B Nakashima	6	7^{7}
(United States) Ma Redlicki	7^{7}	6
(Netherlands) G Brouwer	6^{5}	4
(United Kingdom) L Glasspool	4	4
(United States) A Ritschard	6	6
(United Kingdom) R Peniston	5	6	2
WC	(Sweden) C Söderlund	7	4	6

Second round
8	(Canada) P Polansky	4	6	1
WC	(United States) B Nakashima	6	4	6
(United States) Ma Redlicki	2	4
12	(France) M Janvier	6	6
LL	(United States) D Novikov	6	6
(United States) A Ritschard	2	1
WC	(Sweden) C Söderlund	6^{3}	2
4	(Japan) T Daniel	7^{7}	6

Third round
WC	(United States) B Nakashima	7^{7}	6
12	(France) M Janvier	6^{5}	3
LL	(United States) D Novikov	4	2
4	(Japan) T Daniel	6	6

Quarterfinals
WC	(United States) B Nakashima	6^{7}	6	6
4	(Japan) T Daniel	7^{9}	1	3

==== Section 4 ====
First round
(Brazil) T Bellucci	7	6
(Israel) E Leshem	5	4
(United States) D Young	3	6^{2}
(Slovenia) B Kavčič	6	7^{7}
(Netherlands) J Sels	4	6	1
(United States) S Korda	6	3	6
(United Kingdom) E Hoyt	4	2
(Canada) F Peliwo	6	6

Second round
7	(Australia) C O'Connell	6	6
(Brazil) T Bellucci	3	4
(Slovenia) B Kavčič	6^{5}	4
10	(Canada) V Pospisil	7^{7}	6
15	(United States) M Krueger	3	6	6
(United States) S Korda	6	3	1
(Canada) F Peliwo	6	7
2	(Croatia) I Karlović	1	5

Third round
7	(Australia) C O'Connell	3	2
10	(Canada) V Pospisil	6	6
15	(United States) M Krueger	1	6	1
(Canada) F Peliwo	6	2	6

Quarterfinals
10	(Canada) V Pospisil	6	6
(Canada) F Peliwo	1	2
