= 2025 Charlottesville Men's Pro Challenger =

- Date: 27 October – 2 November
- Edition: 16th
- Surface: Hard (indoor)
- Location: Charlottesville, United States

Champions

Singles
- (Spain) Rafael Jódar

Doubles
- (Germany) Tim Rühl / (Germany) Patrick Zahraj
- Charlottesville Men's Pro Challenger

The 2025 Jonathan Fried Pro Challenger was a professional tennis tournament played on indoor hardcourts. It was the 16th edition of the tournament which was part of the 2025 ATP Challenger Tour, taking place in Charlottesville, United States from October 27 and November 2, 2025.

== Singles main-draw entrants ==
=== Seeds ===
Country	Player	Rank^{1}	Seed
AUS	Rinky Hijikata	106	1
CAN	Liam Draxl	122	2
USA	Patrick Kypson	166	3
GBR	Jay Clarke	201	4
COL	Nicolás Mejía	203	5
USA	Martin Damm	208	6
ESP	Rafael Jódar	210	7
GBR	Johannus Monday	238	8

- ^{1} Rankings are as of 20 October 2025.

=== Other entrants ===
The following players received wildcards into the singles main draw:

- (Switzerland) Dylan Dietrich
- (United States) Andre Ilagan
- (United States) Ronit Karki

The following player received entry into the singles main draw using a protected ranking:

- (United States) Thai-Son Kwiatkowski

The following player received entry into the singles main draw through the College Accelerator programme:

- (United Kingdom) Oliver Tarvet

The following player received entry into the singles main draw through the Next Gen Accelerator programme:

- (United States) Darwin Blanch

The following players received entry into the singles main draw as alternates:

- (United Kingdom) Charles Broom
- (Spain) Iñaki Montes de la Torre
- (United States) Tyler Zink

The following players received entry from the qualifying draw:

- (Canada) Justin Boulais
- (Poland) Maks Kaśnikowski
- (United States) Cannon Kingsley
- (United States) Keegan Smith
- (India) Dhakshineswar Suresh
- (Germany) Max Wiskandt

== Champions ==
=== Singles ===
- (Spain) Rafael Jódar def. (United States) Martin Damm 6–3, 7–6^{(7–2)}.

=== Doubles ===
- (Germany) Tim Rühl / (Germany) Patrick Zahraj def. (Canada) Justin Boulais / (United States) Mac Kiger 3–6, 7–5, [12–10].
