= 2013 Charlottesville Men's Pro Challenger =

- Date: 28 October – 3 November
- Edition: 5th
- Surface: Hard (indoor)
- Location: Charlottesville, United States

Champions

Singles
- (United States) Michael Russell

Doubles
- (United States) Steve Johnson / (United States) Tim Smyczek
← 2012 ·	Charlottesville Men's Pro Challenger	· 2014 →

The 2013 Charlottesville Men's Pro Challenger was a professional tennis tournament played on hard courts. It was the fifth edition of the tournament which was part of the 2013 ATP Challenger Tour. It took place in Charlottesville, United States between October 28 and November 3, 2013.

== Singles main-draw entrants ==
=== Seeds ===
Country	Player	Rank^{1}	Seed
USA	Tim Smyczek	80	1
IND	Somdev Devvarman	90	2
USA	Michael Russell	94	3
USA	Donald Young	104	4
USA	Rajeev Ram	120	5
USA	Alex Kuznetsov	123	6
USA	Rhyne Williams	125	7
USA	Steve Johnson	159	8

- ^{1} Rankings are as of October 22, 2013.

=== Other entrants ===
The following players received wildcards into the singles main draw:

- (United States) Mitchell Frank
- (United States) Jarmere Jenkins
- (United States) Noah Rubin
- (United States) Mac Styslinger

The following players received entry from the qualifying draw:

- (United States) Kevin King
- (United Kingdom) Joshua Milton
- (United Kingdom) David Rice
- (France) Laurent Rochette

== Champions ==
=== Singles ===
- (United States) Michael Russell def. (Canada) Peter Polansky, 7–5, 2–6, 7–6^{(7–5)}

=== Doubles ===
- (United States) Steve Johnson / (United States) Tim Smyczek def. (United States) Jarmere Jenkins / (United States) Donald Young, 6–4, 6–3
