= 2019 Charlottesville Men's Pro Challenger =

- Date: 28 October – 3 November
- Edition: 11th
- Surface: Indoor Hard
- Location: Charlottesville, United States

Champions

Singles
- (Canada) Vasek Pospisil

Doubles
- (United States) Mitchell Krueger / (Slovenia) Blaž Rola
- Charlottesville Men's Pro Challenger

The 2019 Charlottesville Men's Pro Challenger was a professional tennis tournament played on indoor hard courts. It was the eleventh edition of the tournament which was part of the 2019 ATP Challenger Tour, taking place in Charlottesville, United States from October 28 to November 3, 2019.

== Singles main-draw entrants ==
=== Seeds ===
Country	Player	Rank^{1}	Seed
CAN	Brayden Schnur	98	1
CRO	Ivo Karlović	102	2
USA	Denis Kudla	109	3
JPN	Taro Daniel	110	4
USA	Marcos Giron	125	5
SLO	Blaž Rola	132	6
AUS	Christopher O'Connell	138	7
CAN	Peter Polansky	160	8
BAR	Darian King	163	9
CAN	Vasek Pospisil	168	10
~~DEN~~	~~Mikael Torpegaard~~	~~169~~	~~11~~
FRA	Maxime Janvier	184	12
~~USA~~	~~Thai-Son Kwiatkowski~~	~~197~~	~~13~~
RUS	Alexey Vatutin	198	14
USA	Mitchell Krueger	200	15
KAZ	Dmitry Popko	208	16

- ^{1} Rankings are as of 21 October 2019.

=== Other entrants ===
The following players received wildcards into the singles main draw:

- (United States) Brandon Nakashima
- (United States) Govind Nanda
- (United States) Alex Rybakov
- (United States) Raymond Sarmiento
- (Sweden) Carl Söderlund

The following players received entry into the singles main draw as alternates:

- (United States) Gianni Ross
- (United States) Evan Song

The following players received entry from the qualifying draw:

- (Italy) Liam Caruana
- (United States) Jacob Dunbar

The following player received entry as a lucky loser:

- (United States) Dennis Novikov

== Champions ==
=== Singles ===
- (Canada) Vasek Pospisil def. (Canada) Brayden Schnur 7–6^{(7–2)}, 3–6, 6–2.

=== Doubles ===
- (United States) Mitchell Krueger / (Slovenia) Blaž Rola def. (United States) Sekou Bangoura / (Slovenia) Blaž Kavčič 6–4, 6–1.
