= 2010 Virginia National Bank Men's Pro Championship =

2010 Charlottesville Men's Pro Challenger
- Date: 1–7 November
- Edition: 2nd
- Surface: Hard (indoor)
- Location: Charlottesville, United States

Champions

Singles
- (United States) Robert Kendrick

Doubles
- (United States) Robert Kendrick / (United States) Donald Young
- Charlottesville Men's Pro Challenger

The 2010 Virginia National Bank Men's Pro Championship was a professional tennis tournament played on outdoor hard courts. It was the second edition of the tournament which was part of the 2010 ATP Challenger Tour. It took place in Charlottesville, United States between 1 and 7 November 2010.

== ATP entrants ==
=== Seeds ===
Country	Player	Rank^{1}	Seed
USA	Taylor Dent	92	1
IND	Somdev Devvarman	94	2
USA	Ryan Sweeting	110	3
USA	Donald Young	123	4
JPN	Kei Nishikori	124	5
AUS	Marinko Matosevic	134	6
AUS	Peter Luczak	137	7
USA	Robert Kendrick	147	8

- Rankings are as of October 25, 2010.

=== Other entrants ===
The following players received wildcards into the singles main draw:

- (Greece) Theodoros Angelinos
- (United States) Alexander Domijan
- (Philippines) Treat Conrad Huey
- (United States) Jarmere Jenkins

The following players received entry as an alternate into the singles main draw:

- (United States) Ryler DeHeart

The following players received entry from the qualifying draw:

- (India) Yuki Bhambri
- (United States) Michael Shabaz
- (South Africa) Fritz Wolmarans
- (United States) Michael Yani

== Champions ==
=== Singles ===
(United States) Robert Kendrick def. (United States) Michael Shabaz, 6–2, 6–3

=== Doubles ===
(United States) Robert Kendrick / (United States) Donald Young def. (United States) Ryler DeHeart / (Canada) Pierre-Ludovic Duclos, 7–6(5), 7–6(3)
