= Lewis Burton =

British tennis player (born 1992)

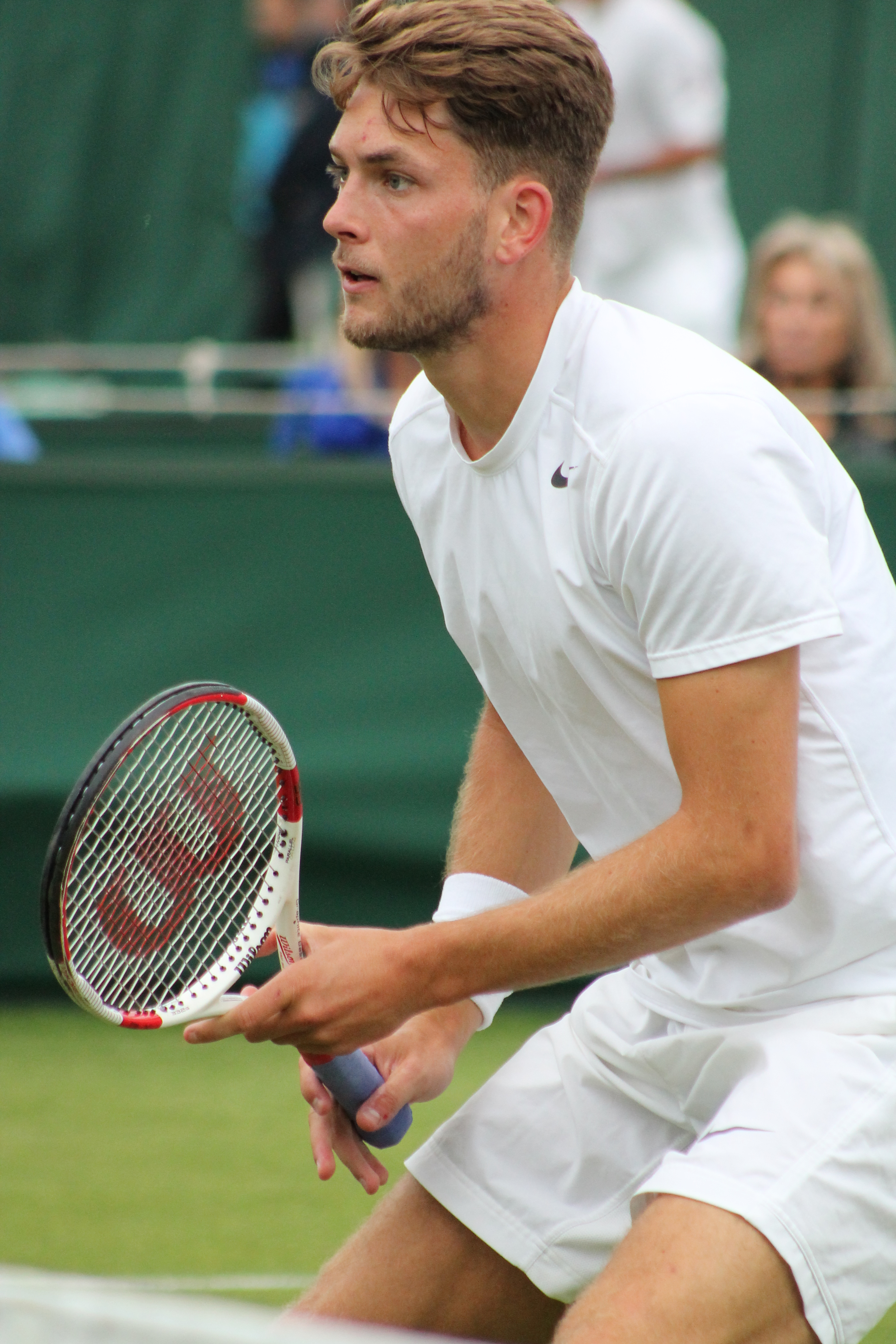
- Burton playing in the 2014 Wimbledon qualifiers
- Full name: Lewis Steven E. Burton
- Country (sports): (United Kingdom) Great Britain
- Born: 23 March 1992 (age 34) London, England
- Turned pro: 2009
- Prize money: GBP£40,531

Singles
- Career record: 0–0
- Career titles: 0
- Highest ranking: No. 626 (19 March 2012)

Grand Slam singles results
- Wimbledon: Q1 (2013)

Doubles
- Career record: 0–1
- Career titles: 0
- Highest ranking: No. 218 (17 November 2014)

Grand Slam doubles results
- Wimbledon: 1R (2012)
- Last updated on: 18 July 2016.

Lewis Steven E. Burton (born 23 March 1992) is a British model and former professional tennis player.

== Early life ==
Lewis Steven E. Burton was born in the Bexley area of London on 23 March 1992.

== Career ==
Burton started playing tennis at the age of seven. He reached a career-high ranking of 172 (singles and doubles combined) on the Juniors circuit, achieved in July 2010. Along with George Morgan, he reached the final of the boys' doubles at Wimbledon in 2010. However, they lost the final 6–7^{(4)}, 4–6 to the fellow British pairing of Liam Broady and Tom Farquharson. The following year, Morgan won the boys' doubles title with Mate Pavić, with Burton being too old to compete. In 2012, Burton and Morgan, now both too old for the boys' tournament, were given a wildcard into qualifying for the men's doubles at Wimbledon. They qualified for the main draw, but lost to Steve Darcis and Olivier Rochus in the first round, by a scoreline of 6–4, 5–7, 6–7^{(3)}, 4–6.

== Personal life ==
Burton began dating television presenter Caroline Flack in August 2019. On 12 December 2019, police were called to Flack's flat in London after she allegedly assaulted Burton by hitting him in the head with a lamp; this tabloid allegation was found to be untrue, the object being a mobile phone. Burton called the police from Flack's flat and was allegedly "begging for help" from the operator, with Burton saying "she tried to kill me, mate". Flack's lawyer alleged during proceedings that Burton did not consider himself a victim, instead describing him as a witness. Flack died by suicide in her flat on 15 February 2020.

Since November 2020, he has been in a relationship with model and entrepreneur Lottie Tomlinson, younger sister of One Direction member Louis Tomlinson. Their son was born in August 2022. They became engaged in November 2023. Their daughter was born in January 2025.

== Career finals ==
=== Doubles: 42 (26–16) ===
Legend ATP Challenger Tour (0–1) ITF Futures Tour (26–15)	Titles by surface Hard (22–15) Clay (1–1) Grass (3–0)

Result	W–L	Date	Tournament	Tier	Surface	Partner	Opponents	Score
Win	1–0	Sep 2010	Great Britain F14, Nottingham	Futures	Hard	(United Kingdom) Dan Evans	(United Kingdom) Sean Thornley (United Kingdom) Marcus Willis	7–5, 1–6, [13–11]
Win	2–0	Sep 2010	Great Britain F15, Wrexham	Futures	Hard	(United Kingdom) Dan Evans	(United Kingdom) David Rice (United Kingdom) Sean Thornley	7–6^{(8–6)}, 6–4
Win	3–0	Oct 2010	Great Britain F16, Glasgow	Futures	Hard (i)	(United Kingdom) Dan Evans	(Australia) Matthew Ebden (United Kingdom) Joshua Milton	7–6^{(7–1)}, 3–6, [10–6]
Loss	3–1	Apr 2011	Turkey F13, Antalya	Futures	Hard	(United Kingdom) Josh Goodall	(Belgium) Maxime Authom (Switzerland) Adrien Bossel	5–7, 4–6
Loss	3–2	Apr 2011	South Africa F1, Durban	Futures	Hard	(United Kingdom) James Marsalek	(Australia) Isaac Frost (Australia) Leon Frost	3–6, 4–6
Loss	3–3	Jul 2011	Great Britain F11, Chiswick	Futures	Hard	(United Kingdom) Edward Corrie	(United Kingdom) Liam Broady (United Kingdom) Dan Evans	6–7^{(3–7)}, 6–4, [7–10]
Loss	3–4	Sep 2011	Great Britain F14, Roehampton	Futures	Hard	(United Kingdom) James Marsalek	(United Kingdom) Josh Goodall (United Kingdom) Marcus Willis	3–6, 7–5, [5–10]
Loss	3–5	Sep 2011	Sweden F4, Uppsala	Futures	Hard (i)	(United Kingdom) James Marsalek	(Sweden) Carl Bergman (Sweden) Markus Eriksson	3–6, 4–6
Win	4–5	Sep 2011	Sweden F5, Danderyd	Futures	Hard (i)	(United Kingdom) George Morgan	(Sweden) Tobias Blomgren (Sweden) Jesper Brunstrom	6–3, 6–2
Loss	4–6	Jan 2012	Great Britain F3, Birkenhead	Futures	Hard (i)	(United Kingdom) Chris Eaton	(United Kingdom) David Rice (United Kingdom) Sean Thornley	2–6, 3–6
Win	5–6	Mar 2012	Great Britain F5, Bath	Futures	Hard (i)	(United Kingdom) Edward Corrie	(Belgium) Arthur De Greef (Belgium) Yannik Reuter	6–3, 6–4
Loss	5–7	May 2012	Sweden F1, Karlskrona	Futures	Clay	(United Kingdom) George Morgan	(France) Albano Olivetti (Chile) Hans Podlipnik-Castillo	3–6, 6–7^{(3–7)}
Win	6–7	May 2012	Sweden F3, Båstad	Futures	Hard (i)	(United Kingdom) George Morgan	(Sweden) Pierre Bonfre (Sweden) Viktor Stjern	6–3, 6–1
Win	7–7	Jul 2012	Great Britain F10, Ilkley	Futures	Grass	(United Kingdom) Edward Corrie	(Australia) Andrew Harris (Australia) Andrew Whittington	6–1, 6–1
Win	8–7	Jul 2012	Great Britain F11, Felixstowe	Futures	Grass	(United Kingdom) Edward Corrie	(United Kingdom) Tom Burn (United Kingdom) Dan Evans	6–2, 6–2
Win	9–7	Aug 2012	Great Britain F12, Wrexham	Futures	Hard	(United Kingdom) Edward Corrie	(United Kingdom) Oliver Golding (United Kingdom) Sean Thornley	6–4, 6–0
Win	10–7	Oct 2012	Kuwait F1, Mishref	Futures	Hard	(South Africa) Ruan Roelofse	(Kuwait) Mohammad Ghareeb (Russia) Mikhail Vasiliev	7–6^{(7–5)}, 7–6^{(7–2)}
Loss	10–8	Oct 2012	Qatar F3, Doha	Futures	Hard	(Kuwait) Abdullah Maqdes	(Poland) Adam Chadaj (Poland) Andriej Kapaś	7–5, 4–6, [6–10]
Win	11–8	Feb 2013	Great Britain F4, Birkenhead	Futures	Hard (i)	(United Kingdom) Neal Skupski	(Republic of Ireland) James Cluskey (United Kingdom) Sean Thornley	7–6^{(7–5)}, 2–6, [10–7]
Loss	11–9	Mar 2013	France F4, Lille	Futures	Hard (i)	(Republic of Ireland) James Cluskey	(France) Jonathan Eysseric (France) Nicolas Renavand	7–6^{(7–3)}, 6–7^{(5–7)}, [5–10]
Win	12–9	Mar 2013	Great Britain F7, Bath	Futures	Hard (i)	(United Kingdom) Dan Evans	(Czech Republic) Jan Minář (Slovakia) Marek Semjan	5–7, 6–1, [10–5]
Loss	12–10	Mar 2013	Great Britain F8, Sunderland	Futures	Hard (i)	(United Kingdom) Dan Evans	(United Kingdom) Daniel Smethurst (United Kingdom) Alexander Ward	5–7, 6–7^{(4–7)}
Win	13–10	Sep 2013	Great Britain F18, Sheffield	Futures	Hard	(United Kingdom) Marcus Willis	(United Kingdom) Richard Bloomfield (United Kingdom) Daniel Cox	6–1, 6–1
Win	14–10	Sep 2013	Great Britain F19, Roehampton	Futures	Hard	(United Kingdom) Marcus Willis	(United Kingdom) Edward Corrie (United Kingdom) Joshua Ward-Hibbert	4–6, 6–4, [10–8]
Win	15–10	Sep 2013	Kuwait F1, Mishref	Futures	Hard	(United Kingdom) Marcus Willis	(United States) Patrick Davidson (India) Saketh Myneni	6–4, 7–5
Loss	15–11	Sep 2013	Kuwait F2, Mishref	Futures	Hard	(United Kingdom) Marcus Willis	(South Africa) Ruan Roelofse (France) Tak Khunn Wang	6–4, 3–6, [6–10]
Win	16–11	Oct 2013	Kuwait F3, Mishref	Futures	Hard	(United Kingdom) Marcus Willis	(Austria) Thomas Statzberger (Austria) Tristan-Samuel Weissborn	6–2, 6–2
Win	17–11	Oct 2013	Great Britain F22, Tipton	Futures	Hard (i)	(United Kingdom) Marcus Willis	(United Kingdom) Graeme Dyce (United Kingdom) Calum Gee	7–6^{(7–0)}, 6–2
Win	18–11	Nov 2013	Greece F20, Rethymno	Futures	Hard	(United Kingdom) Marcus Willis	(Serbia) Nikola Čačić (Greece) Alexandros Jakupovic	6–4, 7–6^{(7–5)}
Win	19–11	Jan 2014	Israel F1, Eilat	Futures	Hard	(United Kingdom) Marcus Willis	(Uzbekistan) Shonigmatjon Shofayziyev (Russia) Anton Zaitcev	6–3, 6–4
Loss	19–12	Jan 2014	Israel F2, Eilat	Futures	Hard	(United Kingdom) Marcus Willis	(Chinese Taipei) Huang Liang-chi (Israel) Amir Weintraub	3–6, 6–7^{(9–11)}
Win	20–12	Jan 2014	Israel F3, Eilat	Futures	Hard	(United Kingdom) Marcus Willis	(Italy) Claudio Grassi (Israel) Amir Weintraub	6–3, 7–5
Loss	20–13	Feb 2014	Thailand F1, Nonthaburi	Futures	Hard	(United Kingdom) Marcus Willis	(Japan) Yuichi Ito (Japan) Hiroki Kondo	6–3, 3–6, [8–10]
Loss	20–14	Feb 2014	Thailand F2, Nonthaburi	Futures	Hard	(United Kingdom) Marcus Willis	(South Korea) Chung Hyeon (South Korea) Nam Ji-sung	4–6, 7–6^{(7–4)}, [7–10]
Win	21–14	Mar 2014	Thailand F3, Nonthaburi	Futures	Hard	(United Kingdom) Marcus Willis	(South Korea) Chung Hyeon (South Korea) Nam Ji-sung	6–3, 7–5
Win	22–14	Mar 2014	Great Britain F8, Tipton	Futures	Hard (i)	(United Kingdom) Marcus Willis	(United Kingdom) David Rice (United Kingdom) Sean Thornley	4–6, 7–6^{(7–5)}, [10–6]
Win	23–14	Apr 2014	Great Britain F9, Bournemouth	Futures	Clay	(United Kingdom) Marcus Willis	(Australia) Jake Eames (United Kingdom) Brydan Klein	6–1, 7–5
Win	24–14	Jul 2014	Great Britain F13, Ilkley	Futures	Grass	(United Kingdom) Edward Corrie	(United Kingdom) Brydan Klein (United Kingdom) Joshua Ward-Hibbert	6–2, 6–4
Loss	24–15	Aug 2014	Spain F24, Pozoblanco	Futures	Hard	(United Kingdom) Marcus Willis	(United Kingdom) Edward Corrie (United Kingdom) David Rice	4–6, 5–7
Win	25–15	Sep 2014	Sweden F5, Falun	Futures	Hard (i)	(United Kingdom) Edward Corrie	(India) Sriram Balaji (Sweden) Patrik Rosenholm	7–6^{(7–1)}, 6–1
Loss	25–16	Nov 2014	Charlottesville, US	Challenger	Hard (i)	(United Kingdom) Marcus Willis	(Philippines) Treat Huey (Denmark) Frederik Nielsen	6–3, 3–6, [2–10]
Win	26–16	Jan 2015	Great Britain F2, Sunderland	Futures	Hard (i)	(United Kingdom) Marcus Willis	(Sweden) Isak Arvidsson (Finland) Micke Kontinen	6–3, 6–2
