= 2018 Charlottesville Men's Pro Challenger =

- Date: 29 October – 4 November
- Edition: 10th
- Draw: 32S/16D/32QS/4QD
- Surface: Indoor Hard
- Location: Charlottesville, United States

Champions

Singles
- (United States) Tommy Paul

Doubles
- (Finland) Harri Heliövaara / (Switzerland) Henri Laaksonen
- Charlottesville Men's Pro Challenger

The 2018 Charlottesville Men's Pro Challenger was a professional tennis tournament played on indoor hard courts. It was the tenth edition of the tournament which was part of the 2018 ATP Challenger Tour, taking place in Charlottesville, United States from October 29 to November 4, 2018.

== Singles main-draw entrants ==
=== Seeds ===
Country	Player	Rank^{1}	Seed
USA	Bradley Klahn	100	1
USA	Michael Mmoh	103	2
CRO	Ivo Karlović	108	3
RSA	Lloyd Harris	112	4
USA	Tim Smyczek	123	5
TPE	Jason Jung	127	6
USA	Noah Rubin	129	7
CAN	Peter Polansky	130	8

- ^{1} Rankings are as of October 22, 2018.

=== Other entrants ===
The following players received wildcards into the singles main draw:

- (United States) Collin Altamirano
- (United States) Bradley Klahn
- (United States) Thai-Son Kwiatkowski
- (United States) Michael Mmoh

The following player received entry into the singles main draw as an alternate:

- (Netherlands) Jelle Sels

The following players received entry from the qualifying draw:

- (Cyprus) Petros Chrysochos
- (United States) Marcos Giron
- (United Kingdom) Lloyd Glasspool
- (Kazakhstan) Denis Yevseyev

The following players received entry as lucky losers:

- (United States) Jared Hiltzik
- (United States) Tommy Paul

== Champions ==
=== Singles ===
- (United States) Tommy Paul def. (Canada) Peter Polansky 6–2, 6–2.

=== Doubles ===
- (Finland) Harri Heliövaara / (Switzerland) Henri Laaksonen def. (Japan) Toshihide Matsui / (Denmark) Frederik Nielsen 6–3, 6–4.
