= 2012 Charlottesville Men's Pro Challenger =

- Date: 29 October – 4 November
- Edition: 4th
- Surface: Hard (indoor)
- Location: Charlottesville, United States

Champions

Singles
- (United States) Denis Kudla

Doubles
- (Australia) John Peers / (Australia) John-Patrick Smith
← 2011 ·	Charlottesville Men's Pro Challenger	· 2013 →

The 2012 Charlottesville Men's Pro Challenger was a professional tennis tournament played on hard courts. It was the fourth edition of the tournament which was part of the 2012 ATP Challenger Tour. It took place in Charlottesville, United States between October 29 and November 4, 2012.

== Singles main-draw entrants ==
=== Seeds ===
Country	Player	Rank^{1}	Seed
USA	Jesse Levine	69	1
RUS	Alex Bogomolov Jr.	96	2
USA	Michael Russell	102	3
GER	Mischa Zverev	140	4
USA	Ryan Sweeting	146	5
USA	Bobby Reynolds	152	6
USA	Tim Smyczek	158	7
USA	Denis Kudla	162	8

- ^{1} Rankings are as of October 22, 2012.

=== Other entrants ===
The following players received wildcards into the singles main draw:

- (India) Somdev Devvarman
- (United States) Alexander Domijan
- (United States) Austin Krajicek
- (United States) Michael McClune

The following players received entry from the qualifying draw:

- (Japan) Taro Daniel
- (United States) Eric Quigley
- (United States) Mac Styslinger
- (South Africa) Fritz Wolmarans

== Champions ==
=== Singles ===
- (United States) Denis Kudla def. (United States) Alex Kuznetsov, 6–0, 6–3

=== Doubles ===
- (Australia) John Peers / (Australia) John-Patrick Smith def. (United States) Jarmere Jenkins / (United States) Jack Sock, 7–5, 6–1
