= Danny Thomas (tennis) =

American tennis player

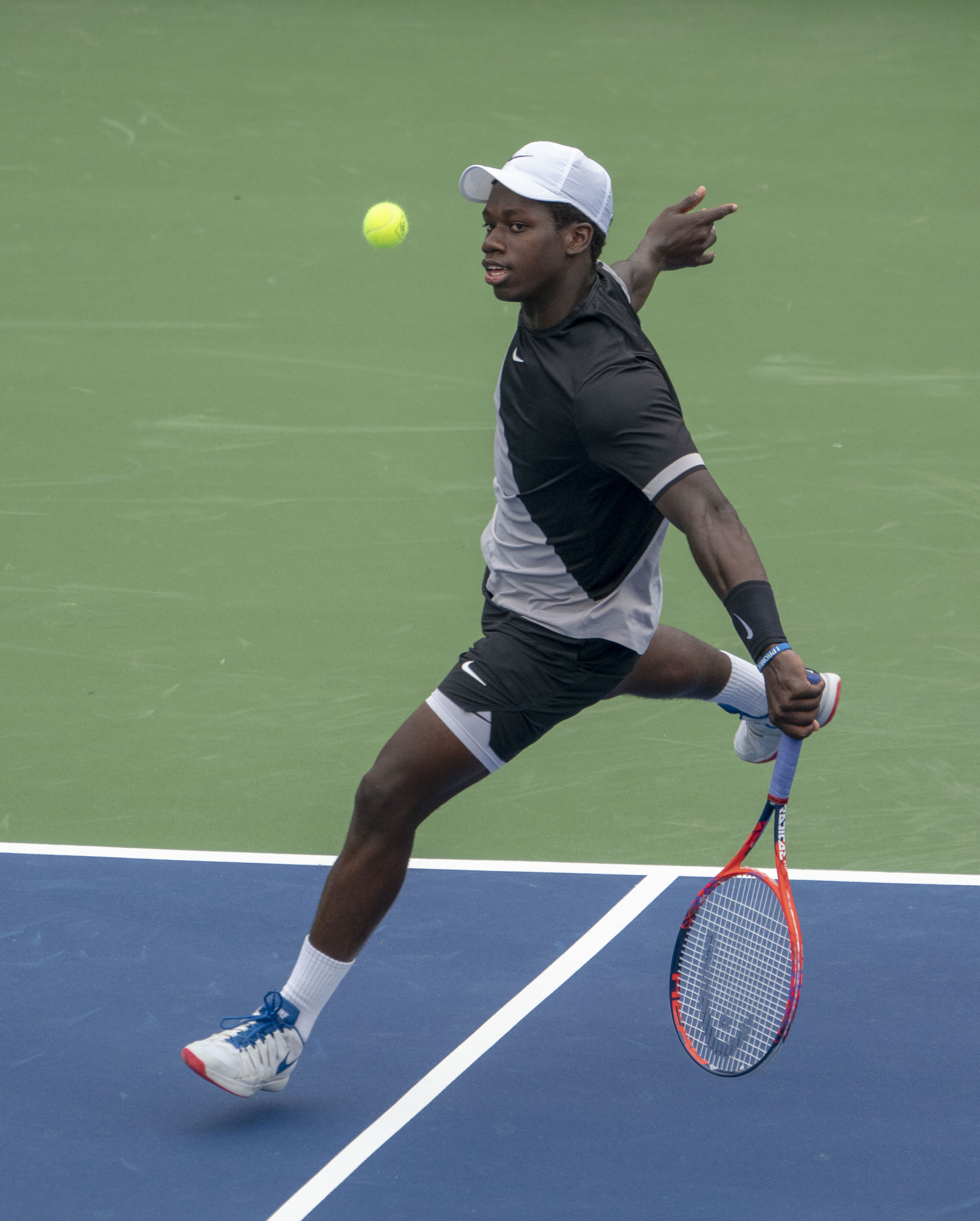
- Thomas at the 2018 Citi Open
- Country (sports): United States
- Born: 22 November 1999 (age 25)
- Height: 1.80 m (5 ft 11 in)
- Plays: Left-handed (two-handed backhand)
- Prize money: $35,476

Singles
- Career record: 0–0 (at ATP Tour level, Grand Slam level, and in Davis Cup)
- Career titles: 0 ITF
- Highest ranking: No. 541 (24 December 2018)

Doubles
- Career record: 0–2 (at ATP Tour level, Grand Slam level, and in Davis Cup)
- Career titles: 1 ATP Challenger, 3 ITF
- Highest ranking: No. 442 (1 October 2018)

Grand Slam doubles results
- US Open: 1R (2017, 2018)
- Last updated on: 1 July 2025.

Danny Thomas (born 22 November 1999) is an American former tennis player. Thomas has a career high ATP singles ranking of No. 724 achieved on 16 April 2018. He also has a career high ATP doubles ranking of No. 488 achieved on 16 July 2018.

Thomas made his Grand Slam main draw debut at the 2017 US Open after receiving a wildcard for winning the USTA under-18 boys' national hard court championship with Vasil Kirkov.

== ATP Challenger and ITF Futures finals ==
=== Doubles: 4 (4–0) ===
Legend ATP Challenger (1–0) ITF Futures (3–0)	Finals by surface Hard (3–0) Clay (1–0) Grass (0–0)

Result	W–L	Date	Tournament	Tier	Surface	Partner	Opponents	Score
Win	4–0	Nov 2017	Charlottesville, US	Challenger	Hard (i)	(United States) Denis Kudla	(Australia) Jarryd Chaplin (Latvia) Miķelis Lībietis	6–7^{(4–7)}, 1–4 ret.

== Junior Grand Slam finals ==
=== Doubles: 1 (1 final) ===
Result	Year	Tournament	Surface	Partner	Opponents	Score
Loss	2017	French Open	Clay	(United States) Vasil Kirkov	(Germany) Nicola Kuhn (Hungary) Zsombor Piros	4–6, 4–6
