= Izak van der Merwe =

South African tennis player

- Country (sports): South Africa
- Residence: Stellenbosch, South Africa
- Born: 26 January 1984 (age 41); Johannesburg, South Africa
- Height: 1.96 m (6 ft 5 in)
- Turned pro: 2005
- Retired: 2014
- Plays: Right-handed (one-handed backhand)
- Prize money: $430,017

Singles
- Career record: 16–16
- Career titles: 0
- Highest ranking: No. 113 (1 August 2011)

Grand Slam singles results
- Australian Open: Q3 (2011)
- French Open: Q2 (2011)
- Wimbledon: 1R (2008)
- US Open: Q2 (2009)

Doubles
- Career record: 8–8
- Career titles: 0
- Highest ranking: No. 94 (18 July 2011)

Grand Slam doubles results
- Australian Open: A
- French Open: A
- Wimbledon: 2R (2012)
- US Open: A
- Last updated on: 05 Oktober 2018.

Izak van der Merwe (born 26 January 1984) is a retired South African tennis player.

Van der Merwe had a career-high ATP singles ranking of 113 achieved on 1 August 2011.

Van der Merwe represented South Africa at the Davis Cup.

He says he tried to base his play on the former Wimbledon champion, Pete Sampras.

== Tennis career highlights ==
=== 2005–2007: Career beginnings ===
Van der Merwe turned pro in 2005 and ended the year with a singles ranking of 721. During this time Van der Merwe mainly played in the ITF Futures tour. In October 2005, Van der Merwe won his first ITF Futures singles title in Zimbabwe F1.

In 2006 Van der Merwe reached 5 ITF Futures tour singles finals, winning 1. In 2007 Van der Merwe won 3 ITF Futures tour titles.

=== 2008: 1st Grand Slam entry ===
In June 2008, van der Merwe qualified into the 2008 Wimbledon main draw, beating World No. 177 Miguel Ángel López Jaén, World No. 126 Kristian Pless, and World No. 246 Frédéric Niemeyer. He would then go on to lose to Guillermo García-López 7–5, 6–2, 6–2.

In August 2008 Van der Merwe also reached his first Challenger tour final at the Campos Do Jordao-1 in Brazil, where he lost to Brian Dabul.

=== 2010: 1st ATP Challenger title ===
In August 2010 Van der Merwe won his maiden ATP Challenger title at the Campos Do Jordao-1 in Brazil, when he defeated world number 88 Ricardo Mello.

=== 2011: Second and Third ATP Challenger titles ===
In February Van der Merwe reached his first main draw semifinal on the ATP World Tour, when he reached the semifinal of the SA Tennis Open (ATP 250 event) in Johannesburg, South Africa. He went on to lose to world number 110 Somdev Devvarman.

In April Van der Merwe won his second ATP Challenger title at the Soweto Open in Johannesburg, South Africa, when he defeated countryman and world number 184 Rik De Voest. In November Van der Merwe won his third ATP Challenger title at Charlottesville, Virginia, United States, when he defeated world number 283 Jesse Levine.

=== 2012 ===
In July he reached the quarterfinal of the Hall of Fame Tennis Championships (ATP 250 event) in Newport, RI, U.S.A. .

== ATP Challenger and ITF Futures finals ==
=== Singles: 17 (8 titles-9 runner-ups) ===
Legend (singles) ATP Challenger Tour (3–5) ITF Futures (5–4)	Titles by surface Hard (8–16) Clay (0–1) Grass (0–0) Carpet (0–0)

Result	No.	Date	Tournament	Surface	Opponent	Score
Win	1.	23 October 2005	Zimbabwe F1, Bulawayo	Hard	(South Africa) Andrew Anderson	4–6, 6–4, 6–3
Loss	2.	21 May 2006	USA F11, Tampa	Clay	(United States) Robert Yim	6–3, 4–6, 4–6
Loss	3.	2 July 2006	Thailand F3, Bangkok	Hard	(Japan) Takahiro Terachi	7–6, 1–6, 4–6
Loss	4.	8 October 2006	USA F25, Laguna Niguel	Hard	(United States) Brian Wilson	7–6, 2–6, 4–6
Win	5.	22 October 2006	USA F26, Mansfield	Hard	(United States) Michael McClune	7–6, 6–4
Loss	6.	29 October 2006	USA F27, Baton Rouge	Hard	(Israel) Dudi Sela	7–5, 4–6, 3–6
Win	7.	15 April 2007	USA F7, Mobile	Hard	(United States) Ryler DeHeart	6–1, 6–4
Win	8.	22 July 2007	USA F18, Joplin	Hard	(Russia) Andrey Kumantsov	6–3, 6–4
Win	9.	28 October 2007	USA F27, Baton Rouge	Hard	(Australia) Carsten Ball	6–2, 7–6
Loss	10.	10 August 2008	Campos do Jordão, Brazil	Hard	(Argentina) Brian Dabul	5–7, 7–6, 3–6
Loss	11.	24 May 2009	Cremona, Italy	Hard	(Germany) Benjamin Becker	5–7, 1–6
Loss	12.	18 April 2010	Johannesburg, South Africa	Hard	(Germany) Dustin Brown	6–7, 3–6
Win	13.	8 August 2010	Campos do Jordão, Brazil	Hard	(Brazil) Ricardo Mello	7–6^{(8–6)}, 6–3
Loss	14.	15 August 2010	Brasília, Brazil	Hard	(Japan) Tatsuma Ito	4–6, 4–6
Win	15.	17 April 2011	Johannesburg, South Africa	Hard	(South Africa) Rik de Voest	6–7^{(2–7)}, 7–5, 6–3
Loss	16.	7 August 2011	Campos do Jordão, Brazil	Hard	(Brazil) Rogerio Dutra Silva	4–6, 7–6, 3–6
Win	17.	6 November 2011	Charlottesville, United States	Hard	(United States) Jesse Levine	4–6, 6–3, 6–4

== Singles performance timeline ==
Key
W	F	SF	QF	#R	RR	Q#	DNQ	A	NH

(W) winner; (F) finalist; (SF) semifinalist; (QF) quarterfinalist; (#R) rounds 4, 3, 2, 1; (RR) round-robin stage; (Q#) qualification round; (DNQ) did not qualify; (A) absent; (NH) not held; (SR) strike rate (events won / competed); (W–L) win–loss record.

Current till 2013 US Open.

Tournament	2007	2008	2009	2010	2011	2012	2013	W–L
Grand Slam tournaments
Australian Open	A	A	A	Q2	Q3	Q1	Q1	0–0
French Open	A	A	A	A	Q2	Q1	A	0–0
Wimbledon	A	R1	Q1	Q1	Q1	Q3	A	0–0
US Open	A	Q1	Q2	Q1	Q1	Q1	A	0–0
Win–loss	0–0	0–1	0–0	0–0	0–0	0–0	0–0	0–1
Career statistics
Titles–Finals								
Year-end ranking	269	304	272	174	113	214	1109	
