= William Woodall (tennis) =

American tennis player (born 2000)

- Country (sports): United States
- Born: February 14, 2000 (age 26)
- Plays: Right-handed
- College: Virginia
- Prize money: $13,947

Singles
- Career record: 0–0
- Career titles: 0

Doubles
- Career record: 0–1
- Career titles: 0
- Highest ranking: No. 376 (July 21, 2025)
- Current ranking: No. 731 (February 16, 2026)
- Last updated on: February 16, 2026.

William Woodall (born February 14, 2000) is an American tennis player.

Woodall has a career high ATP doubles ranking of No. 376 achieved on July 21, 2025.

Woodall made his ATP main draw debut at the 2024 Cincinnati Open after receiving a wildcard into the doubles main draw. He played college tennis at the University of Virginia.
