= Michael Shabaz =

American tennis player

- Country (sports): United States
- Residence: Southern California, United States
- Born: August 20, 1987 (age 39) Virginia, United States
- Plays: Right-handed (two-handed backhand)
- College: University of Virginia
- Prize money: US$ 68,742

Singles
- Career record: 0–0
- Career titles: 0
- Highest ranking: No. 394 (23 December 2013)

Doubles
- Career record: 0–4
- Career titles: 0
- Highest ranking: No. 482 (14 January 2013)

Grand Slam doubles results
- US Open: 1R (2009, 2010, 2011)
- Last updated on: 5 August 2022.

Michael Shabaz (born August 20, 1987) is an American tennis player who won the 2005 Wimbledon boys' doubles championship with Jesse Levine. He is an NCAA tennis player for the University of Virginia Cavaliers.

== College career ==
Shabaz teamed with fellow Cavalier Dominic Inglot to win the 2009 NCAA men's doubles championship. They defeated doubles teams from Pepperdine, Texas Tech, and North Carolina before meeting John Patrick Smith and Davey Sandgren of the University of Tennessee in the finals. Shabaz, then a sophomore, and Inglot, a senior, bested Smith and Sandgren in three sets, 3–6, 7–6^{(4)}, 6–4.

Shabaz teamed with fellow Cavalier Drew Courtney to win the 2010 NCAA men's doubles championship for the second year in a row. Again they defeated John Patrick Smith and Davey Sandgren of the University of Tennessee in the finals 6–7^{(4)}, 6–2, 6–3.

== ATP Challenger and ITF Futures finals ==
=== Singles: 8 (4–4) ===
Legend ATP Challenger (0–1) ITF Futures (4–3)	Finals by surface Hard (3–3) Clay (1–1) Grass (0–0) Carpet (0–0)

Result	W–L	Date	Tournament	Tier	Surface	Opponent	Score
Loss	0–1	Nov 2010	Charlottesville, United States	Challenger	Hard	(United States) Robert Kendrick	2–6, 2–6
Win	1–1	Feb 2012	Guatemala F1, Guatemala City	Futures	Hard	(United States) Adam El Mihdawy	6–1, 6–4
Win	2–1	Dec 2012	India F17, Belgaum	Futures	Hard	(Germany) Torsten Wietoska	6–0, 7–6^{(7–3)}
Loss	2–2	Jun 2013	USA F17, Rochester	Futures	Clay	(United States) Jarmere Jenkins	7–5, 2–6, 2–6
Win	3–2	Jul 2013	USA F18, Pittsburgh	Futures	Clay	(United States) Jason Tahir	5–7, 6–2, 6–4
Win	4–2	Jul 2013	USA F20, Godfrey	Futures	Hard	(United States) Noah Rubin	6–3, 7–5
Loss	4–3	Dec 2013	Qatar F4, Doha	Futures	Hard	(Bulgaria) Tihomir Grozdanov	6–7^{(8–10)}, 3–6
Loss	4–4	Sep 2018	USA F26, Fountain Valley	Futures	Hard	(Japan) Takuto Niki	3–6, 6–3, 3–6

=== Doubles: 7 (2–5) ===
Legend ATP Challenger (0–0) ITF Futures (2–5)	Finals by surface Hard (2–2) Clay (0–3) Grass (0–0) Carpet (0–0)

Result	W–L	Date	Tournament	Tier	Surface	Partner	Opponents	Score
Loss	0–1	Jan 2006	USA F3, Boca Raton	Futures	Hard	(United States) Jesse Levine	(United States) Brian Wilson (United States) Jeremy Wurtzman	2–6, 6–7^{(4–7)}
Loss	0–2	Jul 2006	USA F17, Peoria	Futures	Clay	(United States) Marcus Fugate	(Australia) Shannon Nettle (Australia) Daniel Wendler	3–6, 3–6
Loss	0–3	Jan 2012	USA F3, Weston	Futures	Clay	(United States) Vahid Mirzadeh	(United States) Daniel Kosakowski (United States) Dennis Novikov	4–6, 6–7^{(4–7)}
Loss	0–4	Feb 2012	USA F4, Palm Coast	Futures	Clay	(United States) Vahid Mirzadeh	(Sweden) Christian Lindell (Portugal) Pedro Sousa	7–6^{(9–7)}, 3–6, [8–10]
Loss	0–5	Feb 2012	Guatemala F1, Guatemala City	Futures	Hard	(United States) Amrit Narasimhan	(New Zealand) Marvin Barker (Australia) Chris Letcher	4–6, 4–6
Win	1–5	Dec 2012	India F16, Dharwad	Futures	Hard	(United States) Amrit Narasimhan	(India) Ajai Selvaraj (India) Ashwin Vijayragavan	6–4, 3–6, [10–7]
Win	2–5	Dec 2012	India F17, Belgaum	Futures	Hard	(United States) Amrit Narasimhan	(India) Vijay Sundar Prashanth (India) Arun-Prakash Rajagopalan	7–6^{(7–3)}, 7–5

== Junior Grand Slam finals ==
=== Doubles: 1 (1 title) ===
Result	Year	Tournament	Surface	Partner	Opponents	Score
Win	2005	Wimbledon	Grass	(United States) Jesse Levine	(Australia) Sam Groth (United Kingdom) Andrew Kennaugh	6–4, 6–1
