= Charlottesville Men's Pro Challenger =

Tennis tournament in Virginia, United States

Charlottesville Challenger
- 2025 Charlottesville Men's Pro Challenger

ATP Challenger Tour
- Event name: Jonathan Fried Pro Challenger (2021-)
- Location: Charlottesville, Virginia, United States
- Venue: Boar's Head Sports Club
- Category: ATP Challenger Tour
- Surface: Hard (Indoor)
- Draw: 32S/32QS/16D/4QD
- Prize money: $100,000 (2025), $75,000
- Website: Website

The Jonathan Fried Pro Challenger (previously Charlottesville Men's Pro Challenger) is a professional tennis tournament played on hardcourts. It is part of the ATP Challenger Tour and held annually in Charlottesville, Virginia, United States, since 2009.

== Past finals ==
=== Singles ===
Year	Champion	Runner-up	Score
2026	(United States) Stefan Kozlov	(United States) Aidan Mayo	7–5, 2–6, 7–6^{(7–3)}
2025	(Spain) Rafael Jódar	(United States) Martin Damm	6–3, 7–6^{(7–2)}
2024	(Japan) James Trotter	(United States) Nishesh Basavareddy	6–3, 6–4
2023	(Kazakhstan) Beibit Zhukayev	(United States) Aidan Mayo	6–3, 6–4
2022	(United States) Ben Shelton	(United States) Christopher Eubanks	7–6^{(7–4)}, 7–5
2021	(United States) Stefan Kozlov	(Australia) Aleksandar Vukic	6–2, 6–3
2020	Not held		
2019	(Canada) Vasek Pospisil	(Canada) Brayden Schnur	7–6^{(7–2)}, 3–6, 6–2
2018	(United States) Tommy Paul	(Canada) Peter Polansky	6–2, 6–2
2017	(United States) Tim Smyczek	(United States) Tennys Sandgren	6–7^{(5–7)}, 6–3, 6–2
2016	(United States) Reilly Opelka	(Belgium) Ruben Bemelmans	6–4, 2–6, 7–6^{(7–5)}
2015	(United States) Noah Rubin	(United States) Tommy Paul	3–6, 7–6^{(9–7)}, 6–3
2014	(Australia) James Duckworth	(United Kingdom) Liam Broady	5–7, 6–3, 6–2
2013	(United States) Michael Russell	(Canada) Peter Polansky	7–5, 2–6, 7–6(5)
2012	(United States) Denis Kudla	(United States) Alex Kuznetsov	6–0, 6–3
2011	(South Africa) Izak van der Merwe	(United States) Jesse Levine	4–6, 6–3, 6–4
2010	(United States) Robert Kendrick	(United States) Michael Shabaz	6–2, 6–3
2009	(United States) Kevin Kim	(India) Somdev Devvarman	6–4, 6–7(8), 6–4

=== Doubles ===
Year	Champions	Runners-up	Score
2026	(Netherlands) Jarno Jans (Belgium) Joran Vliegen	(United States) Daniel Milavsky (United States) Braden Shick	6–4, 6–4
2025	(Germany) Tim Rühl (Germany) Patrick Zahraj	(Canada) Justin Boulais (United States) Mac Kiger	3–6, 7–5, [12–10]
2024	(United States) Robert Cash (United States) JJ Tracy	(Luxembourg) Chris Rodesch (United States) William Woodall	4–6, 7–6^{(9–7)}, [10–7]
2023	(Australia) John-Patrick Smith (Netherlands) Sem Verbeek	(United States) Denis Kudla (United States) Thai-Son Kwiatkowski	3–6, 6–3, [10–5]
2022	(United Kingdom) Julian Cash (United Kingdom) Henry Patten	(United States) Alex Lawson (New Zealand) Artem Sitak	6–2, 6–4
2021	(United States) William Blumberg (United States) Max Schnur	(Philippines) Treat Huey (Denmark) Frederik Nielsen	3–6, 6–1, [14–12]
2020	Not held		
2019	(United States) Mitchell Krueger (Slovenia) Blaž Rola	(United States) Sekou Bangoura (Slovenia) Blaž Kavčič	6–4, 6–1
2018	(Finland) Harri Heliövaara (Switzerland) Henri Laaksonen	(Japan) Toshihide Matsui (Denmark) Frederik Nielsen	6–3, 6–4
2017	(United States) Denis Kudla (United States) Danny Thomas	(Australia) Jarryd Chaplin (Latvia) Miķelis Lībietis	6–7^{(4–7)}, 1–4 ret.
2016	(United States) Brian Baker (Australia) Sam Groth	(United Kingdom) Brydan Klein (South Africa) Ruan Roelofse	6–3, 6–3
2015	(United States) Chase Buchanan (United States) Tennys Sandgren	(Canada) Peter Polansky (Canada) Adil Shamasdin	3–6, 6–4, [10–5]
2014	(Philippines) Treat Huey (Denmark) Frederik Nielsen	(United Kingdom) Lewis Burton (United Kingdom) Marcus Willis	3–6 6–3 [10–2]
2013	(United States) Steve Johnson (United States) Tim Smyczek	(United States) Jarmere Jenkins (United States) Donald Young	6–4, 6–3
2012	(Australia) John Peers (Australia) John-Patrick Smith	(United States) Jarmere Jenkins (United States) Jack Sock	7–5, 6–1
2011	(Philippines) Treat Conrad Huey (United Kingdom) Dominic Inglot	(United States) John Paul Fruttero (South Africa) Raven Klaasen	4–6, 6–3, [10–7]
2010	(United States) Robert Kendrick (United States) Donald Young	(United States) Ryler DeHeart (Canada) Pierre-Ludovic Duclos	7–6(5), 7–6(3)
2009	(Germany) Martin Emmrich (Sweden) Andreas Siljeström	(United Kingdom) Dominic Inglot (United States) Rylan Rizza	6–3, 6–2
