= 2013 JSM Challenger of Champaign–Urbana – Singles =

Urbana – Singles
- 2013 JSM Challenger of Champaign–Urbana

Final
- Champion: (United States) Tennys Sandgren
- Runner-up: (Australia) Samuel Groth
- Score: 3–6, 6–3, 7–6^{(7–5)}

Events
Singles	Doubles
← 2012 ·	JSM Challenger of Champaign–Urbana	· 2014 →

Tim Smyczek was the defending champion but lost to Erik Crepaldi in the first round.
Unseeded American Tennys Sandgren won the title defeating Australian 7th seed Samuel Groth 3–6, 6–3, 7–6^{(7–5)}.

== Seeds ==
1. (United States) Tim Smyczek (first round)
2. (United States) Jack Sock (second round)
3. (United States) Rajeev Ram (second round)
4. (United States) Alex Kuznetsov (first round)
5. (Canada) Peter Polansky (first round)
6. (South Africa) Rik de Voest (first round)
7. (Australia) Samuel Groth (final)
8. (Australia) John-Patrick Smith (quarterfinal)

== Draw ==
=== Key ===
- Q = Qualifier
- WC = Wild card
- LL = Lucky loser
- Alt = Alternate
- SE = Special exempt
- PR = Protected ranking
- ITF = ITF entry
- JE = Junior exempt
- w/o = Walkover
- r = Retired
- d = Defaulted
- SR = Special ranking

=== Finals ===
Semifinals
7	(Australia) Samuel Groth	7^{7}	6
WC	(United States) Dennis Nevolo	6^{5}	4
Q	(United Kingdom) Daniel Smethurst	5	3
(United States) Tennys Sandgren	7	6

Final
7	(Australia) Samuel Groth	6	3	6^{4}
(United States) Tennys Sandgren	3	6	7^{7}

=== Top half ===
First round
1	(United States) T Smyczek	5	2
(Italy) Erik Crepaldi	7	6
(United Kingdom) D Rice	6	6
(Zimbabwe) T Garanganga	3	4
(France) Jules Marie	7^{7}	7
WC	(United States) Jared Hiltzik	6^{5}	5
(United States) M Shabaz	6^{5}	6	3
7	(Australia) S Groth	7^{7}	4	6
3	(United States) R Ram	6	6
WC	(United States) M Giron	4	2
(South Africa) F Wolmarans	4	5
Q	(United Kingdom) J Milton	6	7
(United States) E Quigley	3	3
(United Kingdom) E Corrie	6	6
WC	(United States) Dennis Nevolo	6	7^{7}
6	(South Africa) R de Voest	4	6^{2}

Second round
(Italy) E Crepaldi	7	4	4
(United Kingdom) D Rice	5	6	6
(France) J Marie	3	7^{7}	4
7	(Australia) S Groth	6	6^{5}	6
3	(United States) R Ram	4	3
Q	(United Kingdom) J Milton	6	6
(United Kingdom) E Corrie	6^{3}	3
WC	(United States) D Nevolo	7^{7}	6

Quarterfinals
(United Kingdom) D Rice	3	6^{2}
7	(Australia) S Groth	6	7^{7}
Q	(United Kingdom) J Milton	6	1	6^{7}
WC	(United States) D Nevolo	3	6	7^{9}

Semifinals
7	(Australia) S Groth	7^{7}	6
WC	(United States) D Nevolo	6^{5}	4

=== Bottom half ===
First round
5	(Canada) P Polansky	6^{6}	6^{8}
Q	(United Kingdom) D Smethurst	7^{8}	7^{10}
(Ukraine) D Molchanov	4	3
(India) P Gunneswaran	6	6
(Austria) M Neuchrist	4	6^{5}
(United States) A Krajicek	6	7^{7}
Q	(Bulgaria) D Kutrovsky	6	6
4	(United States) A Kuznetsov	4	2
8	(Australia) J-P Smith	6	7
WC	(United States) T Kopinski	3	5
Q	(United States) E King	3	2
Alt	(India) S Singh	6	6
(Canada) F Peliwo	0	1
(United States) T Sandgren	6	6
(United States) B Fratangelo	2	6	6^{6}
2	(United States) J Sock	6	4	7^{8}

Second round
Q	(United Kingdom) D Smethurst	2	7^{7}	6
(India) P Gunneswaran	6	6^{5}	2
(United States) A Krajicek	7	5	2
Q	(Bulgaria) D Kutrovsky	5	7	6
8	(Australia) J-P Smith	6	6
Alt	(India) S Singh	3	4
(United States) T Sandgren	7^{10}	6
2	(United States) J Sock	6^{8}	1

Quarterfinals
Q	(United Kingdom) D Smethurst	7^{7}	7
Q	(Bulgaria) D Kutrovsky	6^{2}	5
8	(Australia) J-P Smith	2	0
(United States) T Sandgren	6	6

Semifinals
Q	(United Kingdom) D Smethurst	5	3
(United States) T Sandgren	7	6
