= 2012 JSM Challenger of Champaign–Urbana – Singles =

Urbana – Singles
- 2012 JSM Challenger of Champaign–Urbana

Final
- Champion: (United States) Tim Smyczek
- Runner-up: (United States) Jack Sock
- Score: 2–6, 7–6^{(7–1)}, 7–5

Events
Singles	Doubles
← 2011 ·	JSM Challenger of Champaign–Urbana	· 2013 →

Alex Kuznetsov was the defending champion.
Tim Smyczek defeated Jack Sock 2–6, 7–6^{(7–1)} and 7–5 in the final to win the title.

== Seeds ==
1. (United States) Michael Russell (quarterfinals, retired)
2. (Germany) Mischa Zverev (first round)
3. (United States) Denis Kudla (second round)
4. (United States) Ryan Sweeting (quarterfinals)
5. (United States) Bobby Reynolds (first round)
6. (United States) Tim Smyczek (champion)
7. (United States) Jack Sock (final)
8. (United States) Alex Kuznetsov (first round)

== Draw ==
=== Key ===
- Q = Qualifier
- WC = Wild card
- LL = Lucky loser
- Alt = Alternate
- SE = Special exempt
- PR = Protected ranking
- ITF = ITF entry
- JE = Junior exempt
- w/o = Walkover
- r = Retired
- d = Defaulted
- SR = Special ranking

=== Finals ===
Semifinals
7	(United States) Jack Sock	6	6
(United Kingdom) Alex Bogdanovic	4	3
(United States) Rhyne Williams	5	3
6	(United States) Tim Smyczek	7	6

Final
7	(United States) Jack Sock	6	6^{1}	5
6	(United States) Tim Smyczek	2	7^{7}	7

=== Top half ===
First round
1	(United States) M Russell	6	6
(Switzerland) A Bossel	4	4
(South Africa) F Wolmarans	2	5
WC	(United States) D Britton	6	7
WC	(United States) Tim Kopinski	3	2
(United States) B Klahn	6	6
(Russia) T Gabashvili	6^{4}	6^{r}
7	(United States) J Sock	7^{7}	6
3	(United States) D Kudla	7	6
Q	(United Kingdom) J Milton	5	3
(United Kingdom) A Bogdanovic	6	4	6
PR	(United States) J Witten	4	6	3
(Australia) G Jones	6	3	4
WC	(United States) C Buchanan	3	6	6
(United States) T Sandgren	6	7^{7}
8	(United States) A Kuznetsov	4	6^{4}

Second round
1	(United States) M Russell	6	6
WC	(United States) D Britton	4	4
(United States) B Klahn	4	5
7	(United States) J Sock	6	7
3	(United States) D Kudla	3	2
(United Kingdom) A Bogdanovic	6	6
WC	(United States) C Buchanan	6	6
(United States) T Sandgren	2	3

Quarterfinals
1	(United States) M Russell	1^{r}
7	(United States) J Sock	2
(United Kingdom) A Bogdanovic	6	6
WC	(United States) C Buchanan	4	3

Semifinals
7	(United States) J Sock	6	6
(United Kingdom) A Bogdanovic	4	3

=== Bottom half ===
First round
5	(United States) B Reynolds	3	4
(United Kingdom) Daniel Smethurst	6	6
(United States) R Williams	6	6
(United States) A Krajicek	2	2
WC	(United States) Dennis Nevolo	6	6
Q	(United States) C Harrison	4	2
(France) C Reix	2	1^{r}
4	(United States) R Sweeting	6	3
6	(United States) T Smyczek	6	3	6
(Switzerland) M Lammer	4	6	3
(South Africa) I van der Merwe	6	6
Q	(Romania) A Dăescu	2	2
(Australia) J-P Smith	6	6
(South Korea) S-Y Jeong	3	3
Q	(Australia) C Guccione	6	6
2	(Germany) M Zverev	4	3

Second round
(United Kingdom) D Smethurst	5	4
(United States) R Williams	7	6
WC	(United States) D Nevolo	3	2
4	(United States) R Sweeting	6	6
6	(United States) T Smyczek	6	6
(South Africa) I van der Merwe	2	4
(Australia) J-P Smith	7^{7}	3	6
Q	(Australia) C Guccione	6^{3}	6	4

Quarterfinals
(United States) R Williams	7^{7}	6
4	(United States) R Sweeting	6^{4}	2
6	(United States) T Smyczek	7	7^{7}
(Australia) J-P Smith	5	6^{0}

Semifinals
(United States) R Williams	5	3
6	(United States) T Smyczek	7	6
