= 2013 JSM Challenger of Champaign–Urbana =

- Date: 11–17 November
- Edition: 12th
- Surface: Hard, indoors
- Location: Champaign, United States

Champions

Singles
- (United States) Tennys Sandgren

Doubles
- (United Kingdom) Edward Corrie / (United Kingdom) Daniel Smethurst
← 2012 ·	JSM Challenger of Champaign–Urbana	· 2014 →

The 2013 JSM Challenger of Champaign–Urbana was a professional tennis tournament played on hard courts. It was the twelfth edition of the tournament which was part of the 2013 ATP Challenger Tour. It took place in Champaign, United States between 11 and 17 November 2013.

== Singles main-draw entrants ==
=== Seeds ===
Country	Player	Rank^{1}	Seed
USA	Tim Smyczek	81	1
USA	Jack Sock	91	2
USA	Rajeev Ram	123	3
USA	Alex Kuznetsov	139	4
CAN	Peter Polansky	150	5
RSA	Rik de Voest	174	6
AUS	Samuel Groth	194	7
AUS	John-Patrick Smith	220	8

- ^{1} Rankings are as of November 4, 2013.

=== Other entrants ===
The following players received wildcards into the singles main draw:

- (United States) Marcos Giron
- (United States) Jared Hiltzik
- (United States) Tim Kopinski
- (United States) Dennis Nevolo

The following players got into the singles main draw as an alternate:

- (India) Sanam Singh

The following players received entry from the qualifying draw:

- (United Kingdom) Daniel Smethurst
- (Belarus) Dimitar Kutrovsky
- (United Kingdom) Joshua Milton
- (United States) Evan King

== Champions ==
=== Singles ===
- (United States) Tennys Sandgren def. (Australia) Samuel Groth 3–6, 6–3, 7–6^{(7–5)}

=== Doubles ===
- (United Kingdom) Edward Corrie / (United Kingdom) Daniel Smethurst def. (United States) Austin Krajicek / (United States) Tennys Sandgren 7–6^{(7–5)}, 0–6, [10–7]
