= 2013 JSM Challenger of Champaign–Urbana – Doubles =

Urbana – Doubles
- 2013 JSM Challenger of Champaign–Urbana

Final
- Champions: (United Kingdom) Edward Corrie (United Kingdom) Daniel Smethurst
- Runners-up: (United States) Austin Krajicek (United States) Tennys Sandgren
- Score: 7–6^{(7–5)}, 0–6, [10–7]

Events
Singles	Doubles
← 2012 ·	JSM Challenger of Champaign–Urbana	· 2014 →

Devin Britton and Austin Krajicek were the defending champions but Britton decided not to participate.
Krajicek partnered with Tennys Sandgren, but lost in the final to the British pairing of Edward Corrie and Daniel Smethurst 7–6^{(7–5)}, 0–6, [10–7].

== Seeds ==
1. (Australia) Samuel Groth / (Australia) John-Patrick Smith (semifinals)
2. (United States) Austin Krajicek / (United States) Tennys Sandgren (final)
3. (South Africa) Rik de Voest / (United States) Rajeev Ram (quarterfinals)
4. (Republic of Ireland) James Cluskey / (Austria) Maximilian Neuchrist (first round)

== Draw ==
=== Key ===
- Q = Qualifier
- WC = Wild card
- LL = Lucky loser
- Alt = Alternate
- SE = Special exempt
- PR = Protected ranking
- ITF = ITF entry
- JE = Junior exempt
- w/o = Walkover
- r = Retired
- d = Defaulted
- SR = Special ranking

=== Draw ===
First round
1	(Australia) S Groth (Australia) J-P Smith	7	6
(Italy) Erik Crepaldi (France) Jules Marie	5	2
(Ukraine) D Molchanov (South Africa) F Wolmarans	3	4
WC	(United States) Ross William Guignon (United States) Tim Kopinski	6	6
4	(Republic of Ireland) J Cluskey (Austria) M Neuchrist	4	4
(United Kingdom) D Rice (United Kingdom) S Thornley	6	6
(United States) B Fratangelo (Canada) F Peliwo	4	2
(United Kingdom) E Corrie (United Kingdom) D Smethurst	6	6
(United States) M Shabaz (India) S Singh	6	6
(Canada) Milan Pokrajac (United States) D Zivkovic	4	4
WC	(United States) Andrew Carter (United States) E Quigley
3	(South Africa) R de Voest (United States) R Ram	w/o
(Australia) C Ball (Canada) P Polansky	7^{7}	1	[10]
WC	(United States) Jared Hiltzik (United States) Alexander A. Jesse	6^{4}	6	[12]
Q	(United States) E King (Bulgaria) D Kutrovsky	4	4
2	(United States) A Krajicek (United States) T Sandgren	6	6

Quarterfinals
1	(Australia) S Groth (Australia) J-P Smith	6	4	[10]
WC	(United States) RW Guignon (United States) T Kopinski	3	6	[6]
(United Kingdom) D Rice (United Kingdom) S Thornley	4	4
(United Kingdom) E Corrie (United Kingdom) D Smethurst	6	6
(United States) M Shabaz (India) S Singh	6	6
3	(South Africa) R de Voest (United States) R Ram	4	4
WC	(United States) J Hiltzik (United States) A A. Jesse	4	2
2	(United States) A Krajicek (United States) T Sandgren	6	6

Semifinals
1	(Australia) S Groth (Australia) J-P Smith	6^{5}	2
(United Kingdom) E Corrie (United Kingdom) D Smethurst	7^{7}	6
(United States) M Shabaz (India) S Singh	7^{7}	3	[6]
2	(United States) A Krajicek (United States) T Sandgren	6^{3}	6	[10]

Final
(United Kingdom) E Corrie (United Kingdom) D Smethurst	7^{7}	0	[10]
2	(United States) A Krajicek (United States) T Sandgren	6^{5}	6	[7]
