= 2012 JSM Challenger of Champaign–Urbana – Doubles =

Urbana – Doubles
- 2012 JSM Challenger of Champaign–Urbana

Final
- Champions: (United States) Devin Britton (United States) Austin Krajicek
- Runners-up: (South Africa) Jean Andersen (South Africa) Izak van der Merwe
- Score: 6–3, 6–3

Events
Singles	Doubles
- JSM Challenger of Champaign–Urbana

Rik de Voest and Izak van der Merwe were the defending champions but de Voest decided not to participate.
van der Merwe played alongside Jean Andersen and lost in the final to Devin Britton and Austin Krajicek 3–6, 3–6.

== Seeds ==
1. (Australia) John Peers / (Australia) John-Patrick Smith (quarterfinals)
2. (United States) Devin Britton / (United States) Austin Krajicek (champions)
3. (Romania) Andrei Dăescu / (Australia) Adam Hubble (first round, retired)
4. (Australia) Carsten Ball / (Australia) Chris Guccione (quarterfinals)

== Draw ==
Key

- Q = Qualifier
- WC = Wild card
- LL = Lucky loser
- Alt = Alternate
- ITF = ITF entry
- PR = Protected ranking
- SR = Special ranking
- SE = Special exempt
- JE = Junior exempt
- JR = Junior Accelerator Programme entrant
- CO = College Accelerator Programme entrant
- NG = Next Gen Accelerator Program entrant
- w/o = Walkover
- r = Retired
- d = Defaulted

=== Draw ===
First round
1	(Australia) J Peers (Australia) J-P Smith	6	3	[10]
LL	(Australia) Stephen Hoh (United States) Brian Page, Jr.	3	6	[2]
WC	(United States) C Buchanan (United States) D Nguyen	6^{2}	6	[4]
(United States) B Klahn (United States) D Kudla	7^{7}	3	[10]
3	(Romania) A Dăescu (Australia) A Hubble	6	0^{r}
(South Africa) Jean Andersen (South Africa) I van der Merwe	4	4
WC	(Libya) Fares Ghasya (United States) Tim Kopinski	2	7^{7}	[5]
(United States) D Courtney (United States) J Sock	6	6^{1}	[10]
(United Kingdom) D Rice (United Kingdom) Sean Thornley	6^{3}	4
WC	(Philippines) R Gonzales (United States) Dennis Nevolo	7^{7}	6
(United States) T Sandgren (United States) P Simmonds	6	4	[6]
4	(Australia) C Ball (Australia) C Guccione	4	6	[10]
(United Kingdom) Edward Corrie (United States) V Mirzadeh	6	6
Q	(United States) Jared Hiltzik (United States) Alexander Jesse	3	4
(Switzerland) A Bossel (Switzerland) M Lammer	3	5
2	(United States) D Britton (United States) A Krajicek	6	7

Quarterfinals
1	(Australia) J Peers (Australia) J-P Smith	6	3	[8]
(United States) B Klahn (United States) D Kudla	3	6	[10]
(South Africa) J Andersen (South Africa) I van der Merwe	3	6	[11]
(United States) D Courtney (United States) J Sock	6	3	[9]
WC	(Philippines) R Gonzales (United States) D Nevolo	6	7^{7}
4	(Australia) C Ball (Australia) C Guccione	4	6^{2}
(United Kingdom) E Corrie (United States) V Mirzadeh	6^{2}	4
2	(United States) D Britton (United States) A Krajicek	7^{7}	6

Semifinals
(United States) B Klahn (United States) D Kudla	2	4
(South Africa) J Andersen (South Africa) I van der Merwe	6	6
WC	(Philippines) R Gonzales (United States) D Nevolo	6	4	[8]
2	(United States) D Britton (United States) A Krajicek	4	6	[10]

Final
(South Africa) J Andersen (South Africa) I van der Merwe	3	3
2	(United States) D Britton (United States) A Krajicek	6	6
