= 2012 Trophée des Alpilles – Singles =

Singles
- 2012 Trophée des Alpilles

Final
- Champion: (France) Josselin Ouanna
- Runner-up: (Italy) Flavio Cipolla
- Score: 6–4, 7–5

Events
Singles	Doubles
← 2011 ·	Trophée des Alpilles	· 2013 →

Édouard Roger-Vasselin was the defending champion, but chose not to compete.
Josselin Ouanna won the title, defeating Flavio Cipolla 6–4, 7–5 in the final.

== Seeds ==
1. (Luxembourg) Gilles Müller (quarterfinals)
2. (Italy) Flavio Cipolla (final)
3. (Belgium) Olivier Rochus (first round)
4. (Germany) Matthias Bachinger (quarterfinals)
5. (Russia) Evgeny Donskoy (semifinals)
6. (Russia) Igor Kunitsyn (quarterfinals)
7. (France) Josselin Ouanna (champion)
8. (Portugal) Gastão Elias (first round)

== Draw ==
=== Key ===
- Q = Qualifier
- WC = Wild card
- LL = Lucky loser
- Alt = Alternate
- ITF = ITF entry
- PR = Protected ranking
- SR = Special ranking
- SE = Special exempt
- JE = Junior exempt
- JR = Junior Accelerator Programme entrant
- CO = College Accelerator Programme entrant
- NG = Next Gen Accelerator Program entrant
- w/o = Walkover
- r = Retired
- d = Defaulted

=== Finals ===
Semifinals
7	(France) Josselin Ouanna	4	6	6
(Belarus) Uladzimir Ignatik	6	4	3
5	(Russia) Evgeny Donskoy	1	6	4
2	(Italy) Flavio Cipolla	6	3	6

Final
7	(France) Josselin Ouanna	6	7
2	(Italy) Flavio Cipolla	4	5

=== Top half ===
First round
1	(Luxembourg) G Müller	4	6	7^{7}
(France) M Teixeira	6	3	6^{3}
WC	(France) A Escoffier	3	5
Q	(United Kingdom) D Rice	6	7
(United Kingdom) J Baker	7	6
WC	(France) Martin Vaisse	5	3
Alt	(France) N Renavand	7^{7}	5	3
7	(France) J Ouanna	6^{5}	7	6
3	(Belgium) O Rochus	4	6^{5}
(Belarus) U Ignatik	6	7^{7}
(France) Laurent Rochette	2	2
(France) V Millot	6	6
(United Kingdom) J Goodall	3	2
(France) K de Schepper	6	6
WC	(France) A Mannarino	6	6
8	(Portugal) G Elias	4	4

Second round
1	(Luxembourg) G Müller	7^{7}	6
Q	(United Kingdom) D Rice	6^{3}	4
(United Kingdom) J Baker	6	3	3
7	(France) J Ouanna	4	6	6
(Belarus) U Ignatik	6	6
(France) V Millot	0	3
(France) K de Schepper	6^{4}	6	3
WC	(France) A Mannarino	7^{7}	4	6

Quarterfinals
1	(Luxembourg) G Müller	6^{8}	6^{1}
7	(France) J Ouanna	7^{10}	7^{7}
(Belarus) U Ignatik	6	7^{8}
WC	(France) A Mannarino	4	6^{6}

Semifinals
7	(France) J Ouanna	4	6	6
(Belarus) U Ignatik	6	4	3

=== Bottom half ===
First round
5	(Russia) E Donskoy	6	6
Q	(Germany) Sami Reinwein	4	2
Alt	(Lithuania) L Grigelis	6	6
Q	(France) Florian Reynet	3	4
(Moldova) R Albot	6	6
Q	(Spain) G Olaso	0	1
WC	(France) Elie Rousset	6^{5}	4
4	(Germany) M Bachinger	7^{7}	6
6	(Russia) I Kunitsyn	6	7^{7}
(France) M Gicquel	4	6^{4}
(Russia) K Kravchuk	6	1	7^{7}
(France) P-H Herbert	4	6	6^{5}
(Spain) A Menéndez	7^{7}	6
(Canada) É Chvojka	6^{4}	3
Alt	(Italy) R Ghedin	5	6	3
2	(Italy) F Cipolla	7	4	6

Second round
5	(Russia) E Donskoy	6	6
Alt	(Lithuania) L Grigelis	4	2
(Moldova) R Albot	6^{1}	2
4	(Germany) M Bachinger	7^{7}	6
6	(Russia) I Kunitsyn	6	6
(Russia) K Kravchuk	3	4
(Spain) A Menéndez	3	1^{r}
2	(Italy) F Cipolla	6	4

Quarterfinals
5	(Russia) E Donskoy	7^{8}	7
4	(Germany) M Bachinger	6^{6}	5
6	(Russia) I Kunitsyn	7^{7}	3	1
2	(Italy) F Cipolla	6^{3}	6	6

Semifinals
5	(Russia) E Donskoy	1	6	4
2	(Italy) F Cipolla	6	3	6
