= 2013 Challenger of Dallas – Doubles =

Doubles
- 2013 Challenger of Dallas

Final
- Champions: (United States) Alex Kuznetsov (Germany) Mischa Zverev
- Runners-up: (United States) Tennys Sandgren (United States) Rhyne Williams
- Score: 6–4, 6–7^{(7–4)}, [10–5]

Events
Singles	Doubles
- Challenger of Dallas

Chris Eaton and Dominic Inglot were the defending champions but decided not to participate.
Alex Kuznetsov and Mischa Zverev defeated Tennys Sandgren and Rhyne Williams 6–4, 6–7^{(7–4)}, [10–5] in the final to capture the title.

== Seeds ==
1. (South Africa) Rik de Voest / (Brazil) Marcelo Demoliner (quarterfinals)
2. (Italy) Stefano Ianni / (Ukraine) Denys Molchanov (first round)
3. (United States) Devin Britton / (United States) Austin Krajicek (semifinals)
4. (Russia) Alex Bogomolov Jr. / (United States) Steve Johnson (quarterfinals, withdrew because of Bogomolov's right shoulder injury)

== Draw ==
Key

- Q = Qualifier
- WC = Wild card
- LL = Lucky loser
- Alt = Alternate
- ITF = ITF entry
- PR = Protected ranking
- SR = Special ranking
- SE = Special exempt
- JE = Junior exempt
- JR = Junior Accelerator Programme entrant
- CO = College Accelerator Programme entrant
- NG = Next Gen Accelerator Program entrant
- w/o = Walkover
- r = Retired
- d = Defaulted

=== Draw ===
First round
1	(South Africa) R de Voest (Brazil) M Demoliner	7	3	[10]
(South Africa) J Andersen (South Africa) I van der Merwe	5	6	[7]
WC	(United States) D Kosakowski (United States) V Mirzadeh	1	3
(United States) T Sandgren (United States) R Williams	6	6
3	(United States) D Britton (United States) A Krajicek	6	6
(United States) J Blake (The Bahamas) M Knowles	1	1
WC	(United States) C Buchanan (United States) D Nguyen	4	3
(United States) M Russell (United States) R Sweeting	6	6
Q	(United States) S Bangoura (United States) N Meister	6	2	[4]
(United States) A Kuznetsov (Germany) M Zverev	4	6	[10]
(Australia) C Ball (United States) B Reynolds	3	5
4	(Russia) A Bogomolov Jr. (United States) S Johnson	6	7
WC	(United States) Neil Kenner (United States) Andrew McCarthy	2	1
(United States) B Klahn (United States) D Kudla	6	6
Alt	(Germany) Moritz Baumann (Germany) T Pütz	3	6	[10]
2	(Italy) S Ianni (Ukraine) D Molchanov	6	3	[8]

Quarterfinals
1	(South Africa) R de Voest (Brazil) M Demoliner	4	0
(United States) T Sandgren (United States) R Williams	6	6
3	(United States) D Britton (United States) A Krajicek	6	6
(United States) M Russell (United States) R Sweeting	2	4
(United States) A Kuznetsov (Germany) M Zverev	w/o
4	(Russia) A Bogomolov Jr. (United States) S Johnson
(United States) B Klahn (United States) D Kudla	4	2
Alt	(Germany) M Baumann (Germany) T Pütz	6	6

Semifinals
(United States) T Sandgren (United States) R Williams	6^{4}	6	[10]
3	(United States) D Britton (United States) A Krajicek	7^{7}	4	[6]
(United States) A Kuznetsov (Germany) M Zverev	6	6
Alt	(Germany) M Baumann (Germany) T Pütz	4	3

Final
(United States) T Sandgren (United States) R Williams	4	7^{7}	[5]
(United States) A Kuznetsov (Germany) M Zverev	6	6^{4}	[10]
