= 2013 Challenger of Dallas – Singles =

Singles
- 2013 Challenger of Dallas

Final
- Champion: (United States) Rhyne Williams
- Runner-up: (United States) Robby Ginepri
- Score: 7–5, 6–3

Events
Singles	Doubles
- Challenger of Dallas

Jesse Levine was the defending champion, but lost to Frank Dancevic in the quarterfinals.
Rhyne Williams defeated Robby Ginepri 7–5, 6–3 in the final to win the title.

== Seeds ==
1. (Canada) Jesse Levine (quarterfinals)
2. (United States) Michael Russell (quarterfinals)
3. (United States) Tim Smyczek (first round)
4. (United States) Rajeev Ram (second round)
5. (Australia) Matthew Ebden (first round)
6. (United States) James Blake (semifinals)
7. (Canada) Vasek Pospisil (first round)
8. (Russia) Alex Bogomolov Jr. (first round)

== Draw ==
Key

- Q = Qualifier
- WC = Wild card
- LL = Lucky loser
- Alt = Alternate
- ITF = ITF entry
- PR = Protected ranking
- SR = Special ranking
- SE = Special exempt
- JE = Junior exempt
- JR = Junior Accelerator Programme entrant
- CO = College Accelerator Programme entrant
- NG = Next Gen Accelerator Program entrant
- w/o = Walkover
- r = Retired
- d = Defaulted

=== Finals ===
Semifinals
(Canada) Frank Dancevic	6	4	4
(United States) Rhyne Williams	4	6	6
WC	(United States) Robby Ginepri	6	1	6
6/WC	(United States) James Blake	4	6	3

Final
(United States) Rhyne Williams	7	6
WC	(United States) Robby Ginepri	5	3

=== Top half ===
First round
1	(Canada) J Levine	6	6^{5}	6
(United States) B Klahn	2	7^{7}	3
(Brazil) M Demoliner	6^{11}	6	6
(South Africa) I van der Merwe	7^{13}	4	0
(United States) M Yani	6	7
Q	(Germany) Moritz Baumann	4	5
(Canada) F Dancevic	6	7^{10}
7	(Canada) V Pospisil	3	6^{8}
4/WC	(United States) R Ram	2	7^{7}	6
(United States) D Kosakowski	6	6^{3}	4
WC	(United States) A Krajicek	2	5
(United States) R Williams	7	6
(United States) T Sandgren	3	6^{5}
(Germany) M Zverev	6	7^{7}
(United States) A Kuznetsov	3	6	6
5	(Australia) M Ebden	6	4	1

Second round
1	(Canada) J Levine	6	6
(Brazil) M Demoliner	2	0
(United States) M Yani	4	1
(Canada) F Dancevic	6	6
4/WC	(United States) R Ram	5	2
(United States) R Williams	7	6
(Germany) M Zverev	6	2	0^{r}
(United States) A Kuznetsov	4	6	3

Quarterfinals
1	(Canada) J Levine	1	6	3
(Canada) F Dancevic	6	3	6
(United States) R Williams	6	7
(United States) A Kuznetsov	4	5

Semifinals
(Canada) F Dancevic	6	4	4
(United States) R Williams	4	6	6

=== Bottom half ===
First round
8	(Russia) A Bogomolov Jr.	5	6^{5}
(Ukraine) D Molchanov	7	7^{7}
(United States) S Johnson	4	4
(United States) B Reynolds	6	6
WC	(United States) R Ginepri	3	6	6
(South Africa) R de Voest	6	3	4
(United States) R Sweeting	6	2	6
3	(United States) T Smyczek	3	6	4
6/WC	(United States) J Blake	6	6
Q	(United States) Alexander Domijan	3	4
(United States) D Kudla	6	6
Q	(South Africa) J Andersen	2	1
(France) P-H Herbert	6	6
Q	(United Kingdom) A Bogdanovic	3	3
(Chinese Taipei) J Wang	6	1	4
2	(United States) M Russell	4	6	6

Second round
(Ukraine) D Molchanov	6	7
(United States) B Reynolds	3	5
WC	(United States) R Ginepri	6^{7}	6	6
(United States) R Sweeting	7^{9}	3	1
6/WC	(United States) J Blake	6	6
(United States) D Kudla	4	4
(France) P-H Herbert	2	6^{3}
2	(United States) M Russell	6	7^{7}

Quarterfinals
(Ukraine) D Molchanov	2	6	6^{3}
WC	(United States) R Ginepri	6	3	7^{7}
6/WC	(United States) J Blake	6^{2}	7^{8}	6
2	(United States) M Russell	7^{7}	6^{6}	3

Semifinals
WC	(United States) R Ginepri	6	1	6
6/WC	(United States) J Blake	4	6	3
