= 2013 Challenger of Dallas =

Tennis tournament

- Date: 4–10 February
- Edition: 15th
- Draw: 32S / 16D
- Prize money: $100,000
- Surface: Hard (indoor)
- Location: Dallas, United States

Champions

Singles
- (United States) Rhyne Williams

Doubles
- (United States) Alex Kuznetsov / (Germany) Mischa Zverev
- Challenger of Dallas

The 2013 Challenger of Dallas was a professional tennis tournament played on indoor hard courts. It was the 16th edition of the tournament which was part of the 2013 ATP Challenger Tour. It took place in Dallas, United States between 4 and 10 February 2013.

== Singles main-draw entrants ==
=== Seeds ===
Country	Player	Rank^{1}	Seed
CAN	Jesse Levine	81	1
USA	Michael Russell	89	2
USA	Tim Smyczek	108	3
USA	Rajeev Ram	110	4
AUS	Matthew Ebden	117	5
USA	James Blake	121	6
CAN	Vasek Pospisil	131	7
RUS	Alex Bogomolov Jr.	132	8

- ^{1} Rankings are as of January 28, 2013.

=== Other entrants ===
The following players received wildcards into the singles main draw:

- (United States) James Blake
- (United States) Robby Ginepri
- (United States) Austin Krajicek
- (United States) Rajeev Ram

The following players received entry from the qualifying draw:

- (South Africa) Jean Andersen
- (Germany) Moritz Baumann
- (United Kingdom) Alex Bogdanovic
- (United States) Alexander Domijan

== Doubles main-draw entrants ==
=== Seeds ===
Country	Player	Country	Player	Rank^{1}	Seed
RSA	Rik de Voest	BRA	Marcelo Demoliner	246	1
ITA	Stefano Ianni	UKR	Denys Molchanov	252	2
USA	Devin Britton	USA	Austin Krajicek	267	3
RUS	Alex Bogomolov Jr.	USA	Steve Johnson	277	4

- ^{1} Rankings are as of January 28, 2013.

=== Other entrants ===
The following pairs received wildcards into the doubles main draw:

- (United States) Chase Buchanan / (United States) Daniel Nguyen
- (United States) Neil Kenner / (United States) Andrew McCarthy
- (United States) Daniel Kosakowski / (United States) Vahid Mirzadeh

The following pair received entry from the qualifying draw:

- (United States) Sekou Bangoura / (United States) Nicolas Meister

The following pair received entry as an alternate:

- (Germany) Moritz Baumann / (Germany) Tim Pütz

== Champions ==
=== Singles ===
- (United States) Rhyne Williams def. (United States) Robby Ginepri, 7–5, 6–3

=== Doubles ===
- (United States) Alex Kuznetsov / (Germany) Mischa Zverev def. (United States) Tennys Sandgren / (United States) Rhyne Williams, 6–4, 6–7^{(7–4)}, [10–5]
