= Edward Corrie (tennis) =

British tennis player

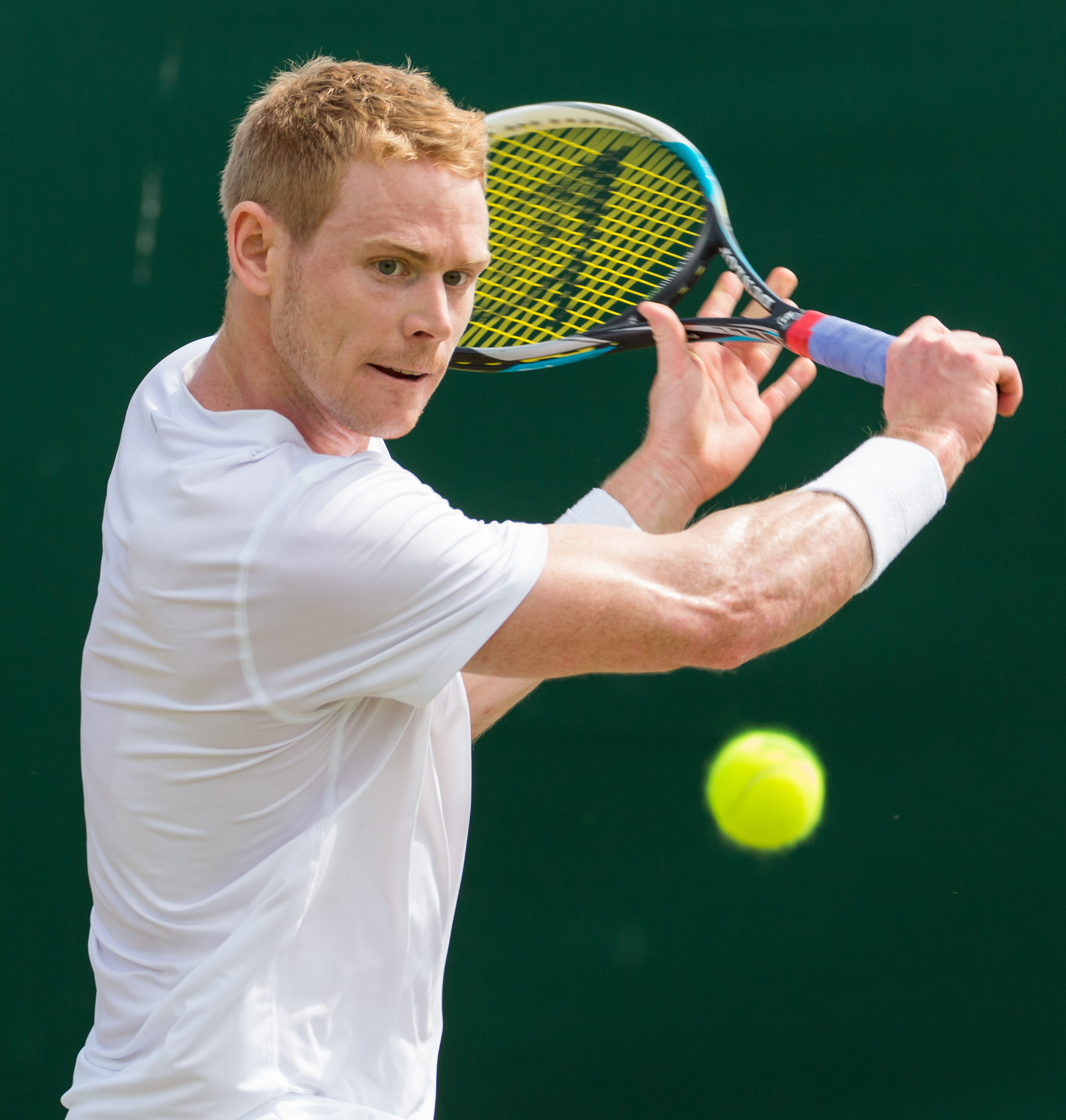
- Full name: Edward Martin Corrie
- Country (sports): (United Kingdom) Great Britain
- Born: 21 February 1988 (age 38) Hatfield, Hertfordshire, England
- Turned pro: 2005
- Retired: 2018
- Prize money: $219,337

Singles
- Career record: 0–1
- Career titles: 0
- Highest ranking: No. 215 (13 October 2014)

Grand Slam singles results
- Wimbledon: Q3 (2016)

Doubles
- Career record: 0–2
- Career titles: 0
- Highest ranking: No. 142 (10 November 2014)

Grand Slam doubles results
- Wimbledon: 1R (2014, 2015)
- Last updated on: 1 October 2018.

Edward Martin Corrie (born 21 February 1988) is a British former tennis player.

== Career ==
Corrie played collegiately at the University of Texas at Austin from 2007 to 2011. He made his debut on the ITF Men's Circuit in 2005, and since then has won 27 Futures tournaments: seven in singles and twenty in doubles. He has also won two ATP Challenger doubles tournaments.

He was primarily a doubles player until achieving success in singles in 2013, earning him a wildcard to the main draw of the 2013 Queen's Club Championships, losing his first round match 4–6, 6–7^{(1)} to Sergiy Stakhovsky, ranked 116th.

Corrie announced his retirement from tennis in 2018.

== Career finals ==
=== Singles: 22 (7–15) ===
Legend (singles) ATP Challenger Tour (0–1) ITF Futures Tour (7–14)	Titles by surface Hard (7–13) Clay (0–0) Grass (0–1) Carpet (0–1)

Result	W–L	Date	Tournament	Tier	Surface	Opponent	Score
Loss	0–1	Aug 2011	Great Britain F12, Roehampton	Futures	Hard	(United Kingdom) Jamie Baker	1–6, 6–4, 1–6
Loss	0–2	Jul 2012	Great Britain F10, Ilkley	Futures	Grass	(United Kingdom) Josh Goodall	4–6, 1–6
Win	1–2	Jan 2013	Great Britain F2, Preston	Futures	Hard (i)	(United States) Christian Harrison	2–6, 6–3, 7–5
Loss	1–3	Feb 2013	Great Britain F3, Sheffield	Futures	Hard (i)	(United States) Christian Harrison	4–6, 6–2, 6–7^{(5–7)}
Win	2–3	Feb 2013	Great Britain F4, Birkenhead	Futures	Hard (i)	(United Kingdom) Daniel Smethurst	6–4, 6–1
Loss	2–4	Mar 2013	Great Britain F5, Cardiff	Futures	Hard (i)	(Denmark) Frederik Nielsen	4–6, 2–6
Win	3–4	Mar 2013	Great Britain F7, Bath	Futures	Hard (i)	(United Kingdom) Dan Evans	6–3, 7–6^{(7–4)}
Loss	3–5	Dec 2013	Turkey F48, Antalya	Futures	Hard	(Bosnia and Herzegovina) Mirza Bašić	5–7, 4–6
Loss	3–6	Feb 2014	Great Britain F5, Nottingham	Futures	Hard (i)	(United Kingdom) Daniel Smethurst	3–6, 2–6
Loss	3–7	Mar 2014	Canada F2, Sherbrooke	Futures	Hard (i)	(Bulgaria) Dimitar Kutrovsky	4–6, 6–3, 2–6
Loss	3–8	Jul 2014	Ireland F1, Dublin	Futures	Carpet	(United Kingdom) Joshua Milton	6–4, 5–7, 2–6
Win	4–8	Aug 2014	Spain F24, Pozoblanco	Futures	Hard	(United Kingdom) Brydan Klein	6–4, 7–6^{(7–4)}
Loss	4–9	Sep 2014	Great Britain F16, Wrexham	Futures	Hard	(United Kingdom) Liam Broady	6–3, 5–7, 6–7^{(6–8)}
Win	5–9	Sep 2014	Sweden F5, Falun	Futures	Hard (i)	(Sweden) Patrik Rosenholm	6–4, 6–2
Win	6–9	Oct 2014	Sweden F6, Jönköping	Futures	Hard (i)	(Estonia) Jürgen Zopp	3–6, 6–3, 6–3
Win	7–9	Mar 2015	Canada F2, Sherbrooke	Futures	Hard (i)	(United States) Tennys Sandgren	3–6, 6–1, 6–3
Loss	7–10	Feb 2016	Great Britain F3, Shrewsbury	Futures	Hard (i)	(Germany) Yannick Maden	6–3, 5–7, 6–7^{(1–7)}
Loss	7–11	Mar 2016	Drummondville, Canada	Challenger	Hard (i)	(United Kingdom) Dan Evans	3–6, 4–6
Loss	7–12	Oct 2016	Sweden F4, Stockholm	Futures	Hard (i)	(Belarus) Dzmitry Zhyrmont	6–7^{(5–7)}, 1–6
Loss	7–13	Oct 2016	Sweden F5, Falun	Futures	Hard (i)	(Russia) Alexander Bublik	4–6, 4–6
Loss	7–14	Sep 2017	France F18, Bagnères-de-Bigorre	Futures	Hard	(France) Ugo Humbert	5–7, 6–2, 6–7^{(4–7)}
Loss	7–15	Sep 2017	France F19, Mulhouse	Futures	Hard (i)	(Belgium) Niels Desein	3–6, 6–4, 3–6

=== Doubles: 39 (24–15) ===
Legend (doubles) ATP Challenger Tour (2–0) ITF Futures Tour (22–15)	Titles by surface Hard (20–11) Clay (0–3) Grass (3–1) Carpet (1–0)

Result	W–L	Date	Tournament	Tier	Surface	Partner	Opponents	Score
Win	1–0	May 2007	Greece F2, Syros	Futures	Hard	(United Kingdom) Lee Childs	(United Kingdom) Iain Atkinson (United Kingdom) Sean Thornley	6–3, 7–5
Loss	1–1	Aug 2007	Great Britain F14, Wrexham	Futures	Hard	(United Kingdom) Tom Rushby	(United Kingdom) Chris Eaton (France) Pierrick Ysern	1–6, 2–6
Loss	1–2	Jun 2011	USA F14, Chico	Futures	Hard	(United States) Trevor Dobson	(United States) Vahe Assadourian (Chinese Taipei) Jimmy Wang	4–6, 4–6
Loss	1–3	Jul 2011	Great Britain F11, Chiswick	Futures	Hard	(United Kingdom) Lewis Burton	(United Kingdom) Liam Broady (United Kingdom) Dan Evans	6–7^{(3–7)}, 6–4, [7–10]
Win	2–3	Oct 2011	USA F26, Austin	Futures	Hard	(United Kingdom) Chris Eaton	(United States) Benjamin Rogers (Australia) John-Patrick Smith	7–6^{(8–6)}, 6–2
Loss	2–4	Dec 2011	Brazil F43, Guarulhos	Futures	Clay	(United States) Jon Wiegand	(Brazil) Gustavo Guerses (Brazil) Pedro Sakamoto	4–6, 6–4, [12–14]
Loss	2–5	Jan 2012	USA F2, Sunrise	Futures	Clay	(United States) Sekou Bangoura	(Philippines) Ruben Gonzales (United States) Chris Kwon	3–6, 5–7
Win	3–5	Mar 2012	Great Britain F5, Bath	Futures	Hard (i)	(United Kingdom) Lewis Burton	(Belgium) Arthur De Greef (Belgium) Yannik Reuter	6–3, 6–4
Win	4–5	Apr 2012	USA F9, Oklahoma City	Futures	Hard	(United States) Vahid Mirzadeh	(United States) Harrison Adams (United States) Shane Vinsant	6–1, 6–0
Loss	4–6	Apr 2012	USA F10, Little Rock	Futures	Hard	(New Zealand) Marvin Barker	(United States) Greg Ouellette (United States) Tennys Sandgren	6–4, 6–7^{(2–7)}, [8–10]
Loss	4–7	May 2012	USA F11, Vero Beach	Futures	Clay	(United States) Vahid Mirzadeh	(United States) Benjamin Rogers (Australia) John-Patrick Smith	7–5, 1–6, [9–11]
Win	5–7	Jul 2012	Great Britain F10, Ilkley	Futures	Grass	(United Kingdom) Lewis Burton	(Australia) Andrew Harris (Australia) Andrew Whittington	6–1, 6–1
Win	6–7	Jul 2012	Great Britain F11, Felixstowe	Futures	Grass	(United Kingdom) Lewis Burton	(United Kingdom) Tom Burn (United Kingdom) Dan Evans	6–2, 6–2
Win	7–7	Aug 2012	Great Britain F12, Wrexham	Futures	Hard	(United Kingdom) Lewis Burton	(United Kingdom) Oliver Golding (United Kingdom) Sean Thornley	6–4, 6–0
Win	8–7	Sep 2012	Great Britain F14, Nottingham	Futures	Hard	(United Kingdom) James Marsalek	(United Kingdom) Miles Bugby (Republic of Ireland) Daniel Glancy	5–7, 6–3, [10–7]
Loss	8–8	Mar 2013	Great Britain F5, Cardiff	Futures	Hard (i)	(United Kingdom) Neal Skupski	(United Kingdom) David Rice (United Kingdom) Sean Thornley	1–6, 5–7
Loss	8–9	Sep 2013	Great Britain F19, Roehampton	Futures	Hard	(United Kingdom) Joshua Ward-Hibbert	(United Kingdom) Lewis Burton (United Kingdom) Marcus Willis	6–4, 4–6, [8–10]
Win	9–9	Oct 2013	USA F27, Mansfield	Futures	Hard	(United Kingdom) Daniel Smethurst	(United States) Jean-Yves Aubone (United States) Kevin King	6–3, 7–5
Win	10–9	Nov 2013	Champaign, US	Challenger	Hard (i)	(United Kingdom) Daniel Smethurst	(United States) Austin Krajicek (United States) Tennys Sandgren	7–6^{(7–5)}, 0–6, [10–7]
Loss	10–10	Jan 2014	Great Britain F1, Glasgow	Futures	Hard (i)	(United Kingdom) Daniel Smethurst	(United Kingdom) David Rice (United Kingdom) Sean Thornley	3–6, 1–6
Win	11–10	Feb 2014	Great Britain F3, Sheffield	Futures	Hard (i)	(United Kingdom) Daniel Smethurst	(United Kingdom) David Rice (United Kingdom) Sean Thornley	3–6, 6–2, [10–8]
Win	12–10	Feb 2014	Great Britain F3, Wirral	Futures	Hard (i)	(United Kingdom) Daniel Smethurst	(United Kingdom) Luke Bambridge (United Kingdom) Ross Hutchins	5–7, 7–6^{(8–6)}, [10–6]
Win	13–10	Mar 2014	Canada F1, Gatineau	Futures	Hard (i)	(United Kingdom) Daniel Smethurst	(Canada) Kamil Pajkowski (Canada) Filip Peliwo	7–6^{(7–4)}, 6–1
Win	14–10	Mar 2014	Canada F2, Sherbrooke	Futures	Hard (i)	(United Kingdom) Daniel Smethurst	(Slovenia) Tom Kočevar-Dešman (Germany) Torsten Wietoska	3–6, 6–3, [10–1]
Win	15–10	Mar 2014	Rimouski, Canada	Challenger	Hard (i)	(United Kingdom) Daniel Smethurst	(Belgium) Germain Gigounon (Belgium) Olivier Rochus	6–2, 6–1
Loss	15–11	Apr 2014	USA F10, Harlingen	Futures	Hard	(United Kingdom) Daniel Smethurst	(United States) Evan King (United States) Devin McCarthy	3–6, 6–7^{(2–7)}
Loss	15–12	Jul 2014	Great Britain F12, Manchester	Futures	Grass	(United Kingdom) Joshua Ward-Hibbert	(United Kingdom) Oliver Golding (United Kingdom) George Morgan	6–7^{(4–7)}, 6–4, [6–10]
Win	16–12	Jul 2014	Great Britain F13, Ilkley	Futures	Grass	(United Kingdom) Lewis Burton	(United Kingdom) Brydan Klein (United Kingdom) Joshua Ward-Hibbert	6–2, 6–4
Win	17–12	Jul 2014	Ireland F1, Dublin	Futures	Carpet	(Denmark) Frederik Nielsen	(Republic of Ireland) Peter Bothwell (Republic of Ireland) David O'Hare	6–2, 7–5
Win	18–12	Aug 2014	Spain F24, Pozoblanco	Futures	Hard	(United Kingdom) David Rice	(United Kingdom) Lewis Burton (United Kingdom) Marcus Willis	6–4, 7–5
Win	19–12	Sep 2014	France F17, Bagnères-de-Bigorre	Futures	Hard	(United Kingdom) David Rice	(France) Enzo Couacaud (France) Laurent Lokoli	6–4, 2–6, [10–5]
Win	20–12	Sep 2014	Great Britain F16, Wrexham	Futures	Hard	(United Kingdom) David Rice	(United Kingdom) Luke Bambridge (United Kingdom) Liam Broady	6–7^{(3–7)}, 6–4, [10–8]
Win	21–12	Sep 2014	Sweden F5, Falun	Futures	Hard (i)	(United Kingdom) Lewis Burton	(India) Sriram Balaji (Sweden) Patrik Rosenholm	7–6^{(7–1)}, 6–1
Loss	21–13	Mar 2015	Canada F2, Sherbrooke	Futures	Hard (i)	(United Kingdom) Daniel Smethurst	(United States) Kevin King (South Africa) Dean O'Brien	4–6, 6–2, [10–5]
Win	22–13	Feb 2016	Great Britain F3, Shrewsbury	Futures	Hard (i)	(United Kingdom) Daniel Smethurst	(United Kingdom) Jonathan Gray (United Kingdom) Stefan Sterland-Markovic	6–1, 6–3
Loss	22–14	Apr 2016	Greece F4, Heraklion	Futures	Hard	(United Kingdom) Lloyd Glasspool	(Ukraine) Vladyslav Manafov (Australia) Bradley Mousley	2–6, 3–6
Win	23–14	Aug 2017	Portugal F17, Sintra	Futures	Hard	(United Kingdom) Marcus Willis	(France) Yanais Laurent (France) Maxime Tchoutakian	6–1, 6–4
Win	24–14	Sep 2017	France F18, Bagnères-de-Bigorre	Futures	Hard	(Denmark) Frederik Nielsen	(Netherlands) Niels Lootsma (Russia) Denis Matsukevich	6–4, 6–2
Loss	24–15	Nov 2017	USA F38, Columbus	Futures	Hard (i)	(United Kingdom) Luke Bambridge	(Mexico) Hans Hach Verdugo (Venezuela) Luis David Martínez	6–3, 6–7^{(2–7)}, [7–10]
