= 2012 JSM Challenger of Champaign–Urbana =

- Date: 12–18 November
- Edition: 11th
- Surface: Hard
- Location: Champaign, United States

Champions

Singles
- (United States) Tim Smyczek

Doubles
- (United States) Devin Britton / (United States) Austin Krajicek
← 2011 ·	JSM Challenger of Champaign–Urbana	· 2013 →

The 2012 JSM Challenger of Champaign–Urbana was a professional tennis tournament played on hard courts. It was the eleventh edition of the tournament which was part of the 2012 ATP Challenger Tour. It took place in Champaign, United States between 12 and 18 November 2012.

== Singles main-draw entrants ==
=== Seeds ===
Country	Player	Rank^{1}	Seed
USA	Michael Russell	103	1
GER	Mischa Zverev	138	2
USA	Denis Kudla	147	3
USA	Ryan Sweeting	151	4
USA	Bobby Reynolds	157	5
USA	Tim Smyczek	161	6
USA	Jack Sock	164	7
USA	Alex Kuznetsov	180	8

- ^{1} Rankings are as of November 5, 2012.

=== Other entrants ===
The following players received wildcards into the singles main draw:

- (United States) Devin Britton
- (United States) Chase Buchanan
- (United States) Tim Kopinski
- (United States) Dennis Nevolo

The following players received entry from the qualifying draw:

- (Romania) Andrei Dăescu
- (Australia) Chris Guccione
- (United States) Christian Harrison
- (United Kingdom) Joshua Milton

== Champions ==
=== Singles ===
- (United States) Tim Smyczek def. (United States) Jack Sock, 2–6, 7–6^{(7–1)}, 7–5

=== Doubles ===
- (United States) Devin Britton / (United States) Austin Krajicek def. (South Africa) Jean Andersen / (South Africa) Izak van der Merwe, 6–3, 6–3
