= Daniel Smethurst =

British tennis player

Daniel Smethurst (Iceman)
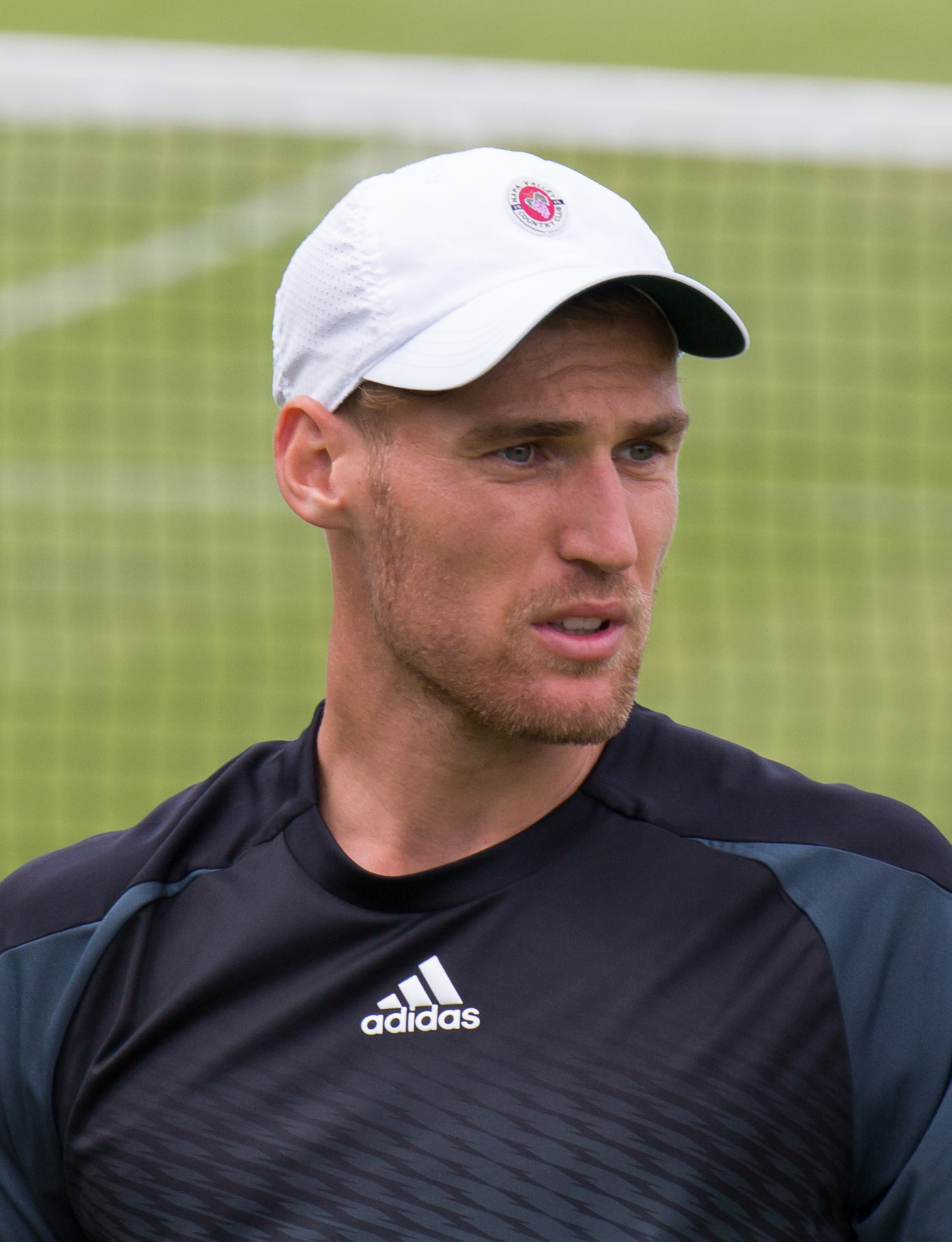
- Smethurst at the 2015 Aegon Surbiton Trophy tournament
- Country (sports): Great Britain
- Born: 13 October 1990 (age 35) Manchester, United Kingdom
- Height: 6 ft 2 in (188 cm)
- Turned pro: 2011
- Plays: Right-handed (two-handed backhand)
- Prize money: $186,522

Singles
- Career record: 0–1
- Career titles: 0
- Highest ranking: No. 234 (23 June 2014)

Grand Slam singles results
- Wimbledon: 1R (2014)

Doubles
- Career record: 0–1
- Career titles: 0
- Highest ranking: No. 159 (28 July 2014)

Grand Slam doubles results
- Wimbledon: 1R (2014)
- Last updated on: 22 February 2017.

Daniel Smethurst aka “Iceman” (born 13 October 1990) is a British tennis player and coach, who has played on the ITF Circuit and ATP Challenger Tour. On 23 June 2014 he reached his highest ATP singles ranking of World No. 234 and on 28 July 2014 reached his highest doubles ranking of No. 159.

Smethurst dropped out of ATP rankings in 2017, his last match being against Calvin Hemery in the 2016 Wimbledon Championships qualifiers, where he lost in straight sets. Smethurst became a tennis coach, working with the University of Bath's tennis team. Prior to his retirement, Smethurst worked with former British number one Johanna Konta, as her assistant coach

== Challengers and Futures finals ==
=== Singles: 27 (12–15) ===
Legend (singles) ATP Challenger Tour (0–0) ITF Futures Tour (12–15)	Titles by surface Hard (9–8) Clay (2–5) Grass (0–1) Carpet (1–1)

Result	W–L	Date	Tournament	Tier	Surface	Opponent	Score
Loss	0–1	May 2009	Romania F3, Pitești	Futures	Clay	(Ukraine) Artem Smirnov	3–6, 4–6
Loss	0–2	Aug 2009	Belgium F1, Eupen	Futures	Clay	(Belgium) Yannick Vandenbulcke	5–7, 0–6
Win	1–2	Aug 2009	Belgium F2, Koksijde	Futures	Clay	(Morocco) Rabie Chaki	7–5, 3–6, 6–2
Win	2–2	Sep 2009	Portugal F4, Porto	Futures	Clay	(France) Benoît Paire	3–6, 6–4, 6–4
Loss	2–3	Feb 2010	Spain F6, Cartagena	Futures	Clay	(Spain) Gabriel Trujillo Soler	6–4, 6–7^{(2–7)}, 2–6
Loss	2–4	Mar 2010	Great Britain F3, Tipton	Futures	Hard (i)	(Spain) Roberto Bautista Agut	5–7, 4–6
Loss	2–5	Nov 2010	Czech Republic F4, Rožnov pod Radhoštěm	Futures	Carpet (i)	(Czech Republic) Jan Mertl	6–7^{(4–7)}, 6–1, 3–6
Loss	2–6	Jan 2011	USA F2, Tamarac	Futures	Clay	(United Kingdom) Alex Bogdanovic	4–6, 6–0, 2–6
Win	3–6	Oct 2011	Sweden F7, Lidköping	Futures	Hard (i)	(Sweden) Carl Bergman	3–6, 6–3, 7–6^{(7–5)}
Win	4–6	Jan 2012	Israel F2, Eilat	Futures	Hard	(Slovakia) Jozef Kovalík	6–4, 6–2
Win	5–6	Feb 2012	Turkey F6, Antalya	Futures	Hard	(Moldova) Radu Albot	3–6, 7–5, 6–0
Loss	5–7	Mar 2012	Portugal F2, Faro	Futures	Hard	(Slovakia) Andrej Martin	2–6, 2–6
Loss	5–8	May 2012	Great Britain F8, Newcastle	Futures	Clay	(United Kingdom) Oliver Golding	4–6, 1–6
Win	6–8	Sep 2012	Sweden F6, Falun	Futures	Hard (i)	(United Kingdom) Joshua Milton	4–6, 6–0, 6–1
Loss	6–9	Feb 2013	Great Britain F4, Wirral	Futures	Hard (i)	(United Kingdom) Edward Corrie	4–6, 1–6
Win	7–9	Mar 2013	Great Britain F8, Sunderland	Futures	Hard (i)	(Czech Republic) Jan Minář	6–3, 6–4
Loss	7–10	Jan 2014	Great Britain F1, Glasgow	Futures	Hard (i)	(Lithuania) Laurynas Grigelis	5–7, 7–6^{(7–4)}, 5–7
Win	8–10	Jan 2014	Great Britain F2, Sunderland	Futures	Hard (i)	(United Kingdom) David Rice	6–3, 7–5
Loss	8–11	Feb 2014	Great Britain F3, Sheffield	Futures	Hard (i)	(United Kingdom) David Rice	7–5, 3–6, 4–6
Loss	8–12	Feb 2014	Great Britain F4, Wirral	Futures	Hard (i)	(United Kingdom) Tom Farquharson	3–6, 5–7
Win	9–12	Feb 2014	Great Britain F5, Nottingham	Futures	Hard (i)	(United Kingdom) Edward Corrie	6–3, 6–2
Win	10–12	Mar 2014	Canada F1, Gatineau	Futures	Hard (i)	(Bulgaria) Dimitar Kutrovsky	6–2, 6–3
Loss	10–13	Apr 2014	USA F10, Harlingen	Futures	Hard	(Serbia) Filip Krajinović	2–6, 4–6
Loss	10–14	Apr 2014	USA F11, Little Rock	Futures	Hard	(Serbia) Filip Krajinović	1–6, 6–7^{(3–7)}
Win	11–14	Jan 2015	Great Britain F1, Sheffield	Futures	Hard (i)	(United Kingdom) Daniel Cox	6–4, 6–4
Loss	11–15	Jul 2015	Great Britain F6, Frinton	Futures	Grass	(United Kingdom) Dan Evans	6–7^{(4–7)}, 6–7^{(8–10)}
Win	12–15	Jul 2015	Ireland F1, Dublin	Futures	Carpet	(United Kingdom) Lloyd Glasspool	6–3, 7–6^{(7–2)}

=== Doubles: 34 (22–12) ===
Legend (doubles) ATP Challenger Tour (3–0) ITF Futures Tour (19–12)	Titles by surface Hard (15–4) Clay (6–8) Grass (1–0)

Result	W–L	Date	Tournament	Tier	Surface	Partner	Opponents	Score
Loss	0–1	Mar 2008	Turkey F2, Antalya	Futures	Clay	(United Kingdom) Edward Seator	(Romania) Andrei Mlendea (Romania) Gabriel Moraru	3–6, 1–6
Loss	0–2	May 2008	Great Britain F7, Bournemouth	Futures	Clay	(United Kingdom) Edward Seator	(United Kingdom) Ken Skupski (France) Ludovic Walter	6–7^{(2–7)}, 6–2, [6–10]
Win	1–2	May 2009	Great Britain F5, Bournemouth	Futures	Clay	(Republic of Ireland) Colin O'Brien	(United Kingdom) Richard Gabb (United Kingdom) Ashley Hewitt	6–3, 6–2
Win	2–2	May 2009	Great Britain F6, Edinburgh	Futures	Clay	(United Kingdom) Marcus Willis	(United Kingdom) Richard Gabb (United Kingdom) Ashley Hewitt	6–7^{(3–7)}, 6–3, [14–12]
Loss	2–3	Aug 2009	Belgium F1, Eupen	Futures	Clay	(United Kingdom) Maniel Bains	(France) Dorian Descloix (France) Maxime Teixeira	6–7^{(1–7)}, 6–2, [5–10]
Loss	2–4	Sep 2009	Portugal F4, Porto	Futures	Clay	(United States) Greg Ouellette	(Spain) Carlos Calderon-Rodriguez (Spain) Pedro Clar	6–7^{(5–7)}, 3–6
Loss	2–5	May 2010	Italy F6, Vicenza	Futures	Clay	(Denmark) Frederik Nielsen	(Italy) Nicola Remedi (Italy) Andrea Stoppini	2–6, 4–6
Loss	2–6	Jan 2011	USA F1, Plantation	Futures	Clay	(United Kingdom) Alexander Ward	(Moldova) Roman Borvanov (United States) Denis Zivkovic	4–6, 4–6
Win	3–6	May 2011	Sweden F2, Båstad	Futures	Clay	(Belgium) Germain Gigounon	(Sweden) Carl Bergman (Finland) Timo Nieminen	3–6, 7–6^{(7–2)}, [10–7]
Win	4–6	Oct 2011	Sweden F6, Falun	Futures	Hard (i)	(United Kingdom) Oliver Golding	(Sweden) Pierre Bonfre (Sweden) Viktor Stjern	7–6^{(7–2)}, 7–6^{(8–6)}
Loss	4–7	Oct 2011	Great Britain F17, Cardiff	Futures	Hard (i)	(United Kingdom) Daniel Cox	(United Kingdom) Oliver Golding (United Kingdom) Sean Thornley	4–6, 4–6
Win	5–7	May 2012	Great Britain F8, Newcastle	Futures	Clay	(United Kingdom) Liam Broady	(United Kingdom) Jack Carpenter (United Kingdom) Ashley Hewitt	7–6^{(8–6)}, 6–0
Win	6–7	Jul 2012	Belgium F2, Havré	Futures	Clay	(United Kingdom) James Feaver	(United Kingdom) Jack Carpenter (Slovakia) Michal Pazicky	6–3, 6–7^{(5–7)}, [12–10]
Loss	6–8	Jul 2012	Austria F3, Bad Waltersdorf	Futures	Clay	(United Kingdom) James Marsalek	(Austria) Maximilian Neuchrist (Croatia) Mate Pavić	4–6, 3–6
Win	7–8	Mar 2013	Great Britain F8, Sunderland	Futures	Hard (i)	(United Kingdom) Alexander Ward	(United Kingdom) Lewis Burton (United Kingdom) Dan Evans	7–5, 7–6^{(7–4)}
Loss	7–9	Apr 2013	France F8, Ajaccio	Futures	Clay	(United Kingdom) James Marsalek	(Belgium) Niels Desein (Belgium) Yannick Mertens	2–6, 2–6
Win	8–9	Aug 2013	Belgium F10, Jupille-sur-Meuse	Futures	Clay	(United Kingdom) Ashley Hewitt	(France) Maxime Forcin (France) Romain Gaborieau	6–1, 6–2
Win	9–9	Oct 2013	USA F27, Mansfield	Futures	Hard	(United Kingdom) Edward Corrie	(United States) Jean-Yves Aubone (United States) Kevin King	6–3, 7–5
Win	10–9	Nov 2013	Champaign, US	Challenger	Hard (i)	(United Kingdom) Edward Corrie	(United States) Austin Krajicek (United States) Tennys Sandgren	7–6^{(7–5)}, 0–6, [10–7]
Loss	10–10	Jan 2014	Great Britain F1, Glasgow	Futures	Hard (i)	(United Kingdom) Edward Corrie	(United Kingdom) David Rice (United Kingdom) Sean Thornley	3–6, 1–6
Win	11–10	Feb 2014	Great Britain F3, Sheffield	Futures	Hard (i)	(United Kingdom) Edward Corrie	(United Kingdom) David Rice (United Kingdom) Sean Thornley	3–6, 6–2, [10–8]
Win	12–10	Feb 2014	Great Britain F3, Wirral	Futures	Hard (i)	(United Kingdom) Edward Corrie	(United Kingdom) Luke Bambridge (United Kingdom) Ross Hutchins	5–7, 7–6^{(8–6)}, [10–6]
Win	13–10	Mar 2014	Canada F1, Gatineau	Futures	Hard (i)	(United Kingdom) Edward Corrie	(Canada) Kamil Pajkowski (Canada) Filip Peliwo	7–6^{(7–4)}, 6–1
Win	14–10	Mar 2014	Canada F2, Sherbrooke	Futures	Hard (i)	(United Kingdom) Edward Corrie	(Slovenia) Tom Kočevar-Dešman (Germany) Torsten Wietoska	3–6, 6–3, [10–1]
Win	15–10	Mar 2014	Rimouski, Canada	Challenger	Hard (i)	(United Kingdom) Edward Corrie	(Belgium) Germain Gigounon (Belgium) Olivier Rochus	6–2, 6–1
Loss	15–11	Apr 2014	USA F10, Harlingen	Futures	Hard	(United Kingdom) Edward Corrie	(United States) Evan King (United States) Devin McCarthy	3–6, 6–7^{(2–7)}
Win	16–11	Jul 2014	Binghamton, US	Challenger	Hard	(United Kingdom) Daniel Cox	(Romania) Marius Copil (Ukraine) Sergiy Stakhovsky	6–7^{(3–7)}, 6–2, [10–6]
Win	17–11	Mar 2015	Canada F1, Gatineau	Futures	Hard (i)	(Belgium) Germain Gigounon	(United States) Kevin King (South Africa) Dean O'Brien	6–4, 6–4
Loss	17–12	Mar 2015	Canada F2, Sherbrooke	Futures	Hard (i)	(United Kingdom) Edward Corrie	(United States) Kevin King (South Africa) Dean O'Brien	4–6, 6–2, [10–5]
Win	18–12	May 2015	Egypt F19, Sharm El Sheikh	Futures	Hard	(United Kingdom) Marcus Willis	(Egypt) Karim-Mohamed Maamoun (Syria) Issam Haitham Taweel	6–4, 6–4
Win	19–12	May 2015	Egypt F20, Sharm El Sheikh	Futures	Hard	(United Kingdom) Marcus Willis	(Egypt) Karim-Mohamed Maamoum (Syria) Issam Haitham Taweel	6–1, 6–3
Win	20–12	Jul 2015	Great Britain F6, Frinton	Futures	Grass	(United Kingdom) Marcus Willis	(United Kingdom) Evan Hoyt (Australia) Bradley Mousley	6–4, 6–4
Win	21–12	Feb 2016	Great Britain F1, Glasgow	Futures	Hard (i)	(United Kingdom) David Rice	(United Kingdom) Scott Clayton (United Kingdom) Jonny O'Mara	6–1, 6–4
Win	22–12	Feb 2016	Great Britain F3, Shrewsbury	Futures	Hard (i)	(United Kingdom) Edward Corrie	(United Kingdom) Jonathan Gray (United Kingdom) Stefan Sterland-Markovic	6–1, 6–3
