= David Rice (tennis) =

English tennis player

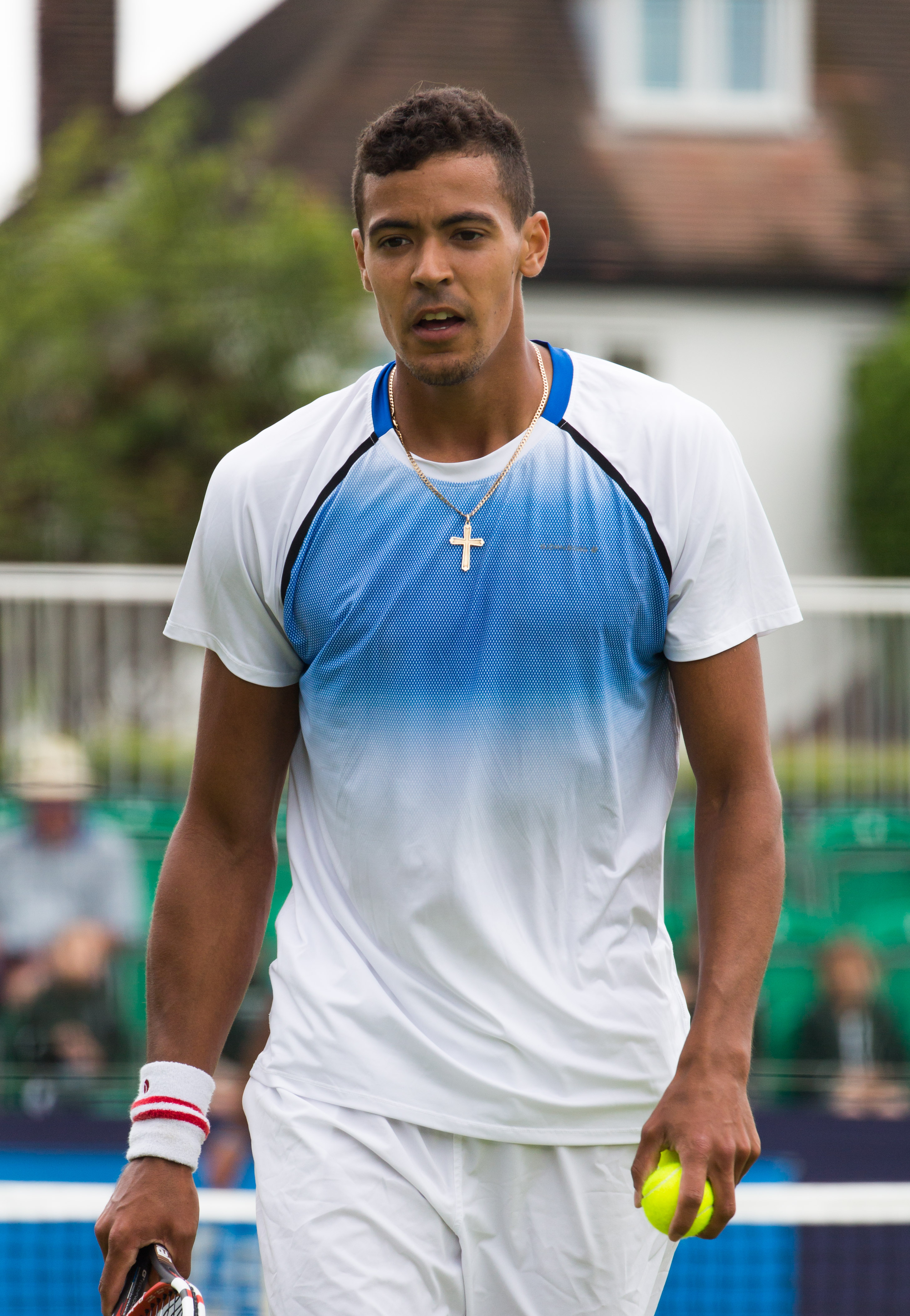
- Country (sports): United Kingdom
- Residence: San Diego, United States
- Born: 1 January 1989 (age 36) High Wycombe, Buckinghamshire
- Height: 6 ft 4 in (193 cm)
- Plays: Right-handed (Double-handed backhand)
- Prize money: US$157,732

Singles
- Career record: 0–0 (in ATP (World) Tour and Grand Slam main draw matches, and in Davis Cup)
- Career titles: 0 (ATP (World) Tour and Grand Slam)
- Highest ranking: No. 283 (10 February 2014)

Grand Slam singles results
- Wimbledon: Q2 (2013)

Doubles
- Career record: 0–2 (in ATP (World) Tour and Grand Slam main draw matches, and in Davis Cup)
- Career titles: 0 (ATP (World) Tour and Grand Slam)
- Highest ranking: No. 177 (26 August 2013)

Grand Slam doubles results
- Wimbledon: 1R (2011, 2013)
- Last updated on: 18 July 2016.

David Rice (born 1 January 1989) is an English former tennis player. He is best known for his activity on the doubles circuit, where he usually played with Sean Thornley.

== Career ==
He qualified for the Wimbledon men's doubles for the first time in June 2011 with Sean Thornley. They lost in the first round to Jamie Murray and Sergiy Stakhovsky, 3–6, 5–7. He has played in Wimbledon 3 times.

After failing to qualify in 2012, he and Thornley were awarded a wildcard for the 2013 championship, losing 4–6, 3–6, 7–6^{(7)}, 6–4, 4–6 to Marinko Matosevic and Frank Moser.

== Challenger and Futures finals ==
=== Singles: 19 (7–12) ===
Legend (singles) ATP Challenger Tour (0–0) ITF Futures Tour (7–12)	Titles by surface Hard (6–9) Clay (0–0) Grass (1–3) Carpet (0–0)

Result	W–L	Date	Tournament	Tier	Surface	Opponent	Score
Loss	0–1	Jul 2009	Great Britain F9, Frinton-on-Sea	Futures	Grass	(United Kingdom) Joshua Milton	6–2, 2–6, 4–6
Loss	0–2	Sep 2009	Great Britain F13, Wrexham	Futures	Hard	(Lithuania) Laurynas Grigelis	2–6, 3–6
Loss	0–3	Sep 2009	Great Britain F14, Nottingham	Futures	Hard	(United Kingdom) Josh Goodall	4–6, 3–6
Loss	0–4	Jul 2010	Great Britain F9, Ilkley	Futures	Grass	(United Kingdom) Josh Goodall	3–6, 6–7^{(2–7)}
Win	1–4	Aug 2010	Mexico F5, Zacatecas	Futures	Hard	(Mexico) César Ramírez	6–3, 6–4
Loss	1–5	Sep 2010	Mexico F6, León	Futures	Hard	(Canada) Vasek Pospisil	1–6, 2–6
Loss	1–6	May 2011	Israel F4, Ramat HaSharon	Futures	Hard	(Israel) Amir Weintraub	3–6, 2–6
Loss	1–7	May 2011	Israel F5, Ramat HaSharon	Futures	Hard	(Israel) Amir Weintraub	1–6, 1–6
Loss	1–8	Jul 2011	Great Britain F9, Ilkley	Futures	Grass	(United Kingdom) Josh Goodall	5–7, 1–6
Loss	1–9	Jan 2012	Great Britain F2, Sheffield	Futures	Hard (i)	(United Kingdom) Dan Evans	2–6, 0–6
Win	2–9	May 2013	Greece F7, Marathon	Futures	Hard	(United States) Alexios Halebian	6–3, 7–5
Win	3–9	May 2013	Greece F8, Marathon	Futures	Hard	(United Kingdom) Richard Gabb	7–5, 4–6, 7–6^{(7–5)}
Loss	3–10	Oct 2013	Great Britain F21, Loughborough	Futures	Hard (i)	(Lithuania) Laurynas Grigelis	4–6, 6–3, 3–6
Loss	3–11	Jan 2014	Great Britain F2, Sunderland	Futures	Hard (i)	(United Kingdom) Daniel Smethurst	3–6, 5–7
Win	4–11	Feb 2014	Great Britain F3, Sheffield	Futures	Hard (i)	(United Kingdom) Daniel Smethurst	5–7, 6–3, 6–4
Win	5–11	Jun 2014	Turkey F18, Antalya	Futures	Hard	(Turkey) Cem İlkel	4–6, 6–4, 6–3
Win	6–11	Jul 2014	Great Britain F14, Frinton-on-Sea	Futures	Grass	(United Kingdom) George Coupland	6–4, 6–4
Loss	6–12	Feb 2015	Tunisia F8, El Kantaoui	Futures	Hard	(Italy) Erik Crepaldi	4–6, 6–2, 6–7^{(1–7)}
Win	7–12	Apr 2015	Qatar F3, Doha	Futures	Hard	(Slovakia) Patrik Fabian	4–6, 7–6^{(7–4)}, 6–2

=== Doubles: 59 (34–25) ===
Legend (doubles) ATP Challenger Tour (1–1) ITF Futures Tour (33–24)	Titles by surface Hard (28–21) Clay (3–4) Grass (2–0) Carpet (1–0)

Result	W–L	Date	Tournament	Tier	Surface	Partner	Opponents	Score
Loss	0–1	Nov 2007	Spain F39, Vilafranca	Futures	Clay	(Croatia) Luka Belić	(Spain) David Canudas-Fernandez (Spain) Carlos Rexach-Itoiz	4–6, 3–6
Win	1–1	Mar 2008	Spain F10, Badalona	Futures	Clay	(Brazil) Marcelo Demoliner	(Spain) David Canudas-Fernandez (Spain) Oscar Sabate-Bretos	6–3, 6–1
Win	2–1	Apr 2008	Spain F14, Málaga	Futures	Clay	(Spain) Marc Fornell Mestres	(Spain) Óscar Burrieza (Russia) Nikolai Nesterov	1–6, 6–2, [10–7]
Win	3–1	Apr 2008	Spain F15, Melilla	Futures	Hard	(Spain) Sergio Gutiérrez Ferrol	(Italy) Massimo Capone (Italy) Claudio Grassi	6–3, 6–4
Loss	3–2	Jun 2008	Slovenia F1, Koper	Futures	Clay	(United Kingdom) Joshua Milton	(Austria) Nicolas Reissig (Austria) Bertram Steinberger	3–6, 5–7
Win	4–2	Oct 2009	Greece F2, Paros	Futures	Carpet	(United Kingdom) Sean Thornley	(Italy) Claudio Grassi (Russia) Mikhail Vasiliev	6–4, 2–6, [10–8]
Win	5–2	Sep 2010	Great Britain F13, London	Futures	Hard	(United Kingdom) Sean Thornley	(Italy) Claudio Grassi (United Kingdom) Alexander Slabinsky	2–6, 6–3, [10–0]
Loss	5–3	Sep 2010	Italy F26, Porto Torres	Futures	Hard	(Greece) Paris Gemouchidis	(Italy) Claudio Grassi (Italy) Francesco Piccari	4–6, 3–6
Loss	5–4	Sep 2010	Great Britain F15, Wrexham	Futures	Hard	(United Kingdom) Sean Thornley	(United Kingdom) Lewis Burton (United Kingdom) Dan Evans	6–7^{(6–8)}, 4–6
Win	6–4	Jan 2011	Turkey F3, Antalya	Futures	Hard	(Sweden) Patrik Brydolf	(Russia) Igor Karpov (Russia) Ilia Starkov	3–6, 6–1, [10–5]
Win	7–4	Feb 2011	France F3, Bressuire	Futures	Hard (i)	(United Kingdom) Sean Thornley	(France) Medy Chettar (France) Valentin Nourrissat	Walkover
Loss	7–5	Mar 2011	Rimouski, Canada	Challenger	Hard (i)	(United Kingdom) Sean Thornley	(Philippines) Treat Huey (Canada) Vasek Pospisil	0–6, 1–6
Loss	7–6	Apr 2011	Turkey F12, Antalya	Futures	Hard	(United Kingdom) Sean Thornley	(Serbia) Nikola Čačić (Slovakia) Jozef Kovalík	6–4, 4–6, [4–10]
Win	8–6	Apr 2011	Great Britain F5, Bournemouth	Futures	Clay	(United Kingdom) Sean Thornley	(Spain) Carles Poch Gradin (United Kingdom) Alexander Slabinsky	6–3, 6–4
Loss	8–7	May 2011	Great Britain F6, Edinburgh	Futures	Clay	(United Kingdom) Sean Thornley	(United Kingdom) James Feaver (Australia) Jarryd Maher	6–2, 0–6, [6–10]
Win	9–7	May 2011	Israel F4, Ramat HaSharon	Futures	Hard	(United Kingdom) Sean Thornley	(Israel) Tal Eros (Israel) Amir Weintraub	3–6, 6–3, [11–9]
Loss	9–8	May 2011	Israel F5, Ramat HaSharon	Futures	Hard	(United Kingdom) Sean Thornley	(United States) John Paul Fruttero (Israel) Amir Weintraub	7–6^{(7–4)}, 6–7^{(3–7)}, [11–13]
Win	10–8	Jul 2011	Great Britain F9, Ilkley	Futures	Grass	(United Kingdom) Sean Thornley	(United Kingdom) Chris Eaton (United Kingdom) Josh Goodall	6–7^{(2–7)}, 6–3, [10–7]
Win	11–8	Aug 2011	Great Britain F12, London	Futures	Hard	(United Kingdom) Sean Thornley	(South Africa) Ruan Roelofse (India) Sanam Singh	6–3, 6–2
Win	12–8	Sep 2011	Great Britain F13, Wrexham	Futures	Hard	(United Kingdom) Sean Thornley	(United Kingdom) James Feaver (Republic of Ireland) Daniel Glancy	6–2, 7–5
Loss	12–9	Sep 2011	Great Britain F15, Nottingham	Futures	Hard	(United Kingdom) Sean Thornley	(United Kingdom) Josh Goodall (United Kingdom) Marcus Willis	4–6, 6–7^{(6–8)}
Win	13–9	Oct 2011	Turkey F25, Antalya	Futures	Hard	(United Kingdom) Sean Thornley	(Russia) Mikhail Biryukov (Russia) Dmitri Sitak	2–6, 6–4, [10–6]
Win	14–9	Oct 2011	Turkey F26, Antalya	Futures	Hard	(United Kingdom) Sean Thornley	(Canada) Érik Chvojka (Czech Republic) Michal Konečný	7–6^{(11–9)}, 6–3
Loss	14–10	Jan 2012	Great Britain F1, Glasgow	Futures	Hard (i)	(United Kingdom) Sean Thornley	(United Kingdom) Chris Eaton (United Kingdom) Dominic Inglot	5–7, 2–6
Loss	14–11	Jan 2012	Great Britain F2, Sheffield	Futures	Hard (i)	(United Kingdom) Sean Thornley	(United Kingdom) Chris Eaton (United Kingdom) Dominic Inglot	3–6, 5–7
Win	15–11	Jan 2012	Great Britain F3, Birkenhead	Futures	Hard (i)	(United Kingdom) Sean Thornley	(United Kingdom) Lewis Burton (United Kingdom) Chris Eaton	6–2, 6–3
Loss	15–12	Mar 2012	Great Britain F4, Tipton	Futures	Hard (i)	(United Kingdom) Sean Thornley	(United Kingdom) Chris Eaton (United Kingdom) Dominic Inglot	3–6, 4–6
Win	16–12	Sep 2012	Great Britain F14, Chiswick	Futures	Hard	(South Africa) Ruan Roelofse	(United Kingdom) Harry Meehan (United Kingdom) Stefan Sterland-Markovic	7–5, 7–6^{(9–7)}
Win	17–12	Sep 2012	İzmir, Turkey	Challenger	Hard	(United Kingdom) Sean Thornley	(Australia) Brydan Klein (Australia) Dane Propoggia	7–6^{(10–8)}, 6–2
Win	18–12	Oct 2012	Great Britain F17, Glasgow	Futures	Hard (i)	(United Kingdom) Sean Thornley	(Lithuania) Laurynas Grigelis (Germany) Bastian Knittel	6–3, 6–2
Win	19–12	Jan 2013	Great Britain F1, Glasgow	Futures	Hard (i)	(United Kingdom) Sean Thornley	(United Kingdom) Scott Clayton (United Kingdom) Richard Gabb	7–6^{(7–5)}, 6–2
Win	20–12	Feb 2013	Great Britain F3, Sheffield	Futures	Hard (i)	(United Kingdom) Sean Thornley	(United Kingdom) Dan Evans (United Kingdom) Andrew Fitzpatrick	6–2, 7–6^{(8–6)}
Win	21–12	Mar 2013	Great Britain F5, Cardiff	Futures	Hard (i)	(United Kingdom) Sean Thornley	(United Kingdom) Edward Corrie (United Kingdom) Neal Skupski	6–1, 7–5
Win	22–12	Mar 2013	Great Britain F6, Shrewsbury	Futures	Hard (i)	(United Kingdom) Sean Thornley	(Belgium) Sander Gillé (Belgium) Jonas Merckx	6–2, 6–1
Loss	22–13	Apr 2013	USA F10, Little Rock	Futures	Hard	(United Kingdom) Sean Thornley	(United States) Chase Buchanan (United States) Austin Krajicek	2–6, 3–6
Loss	22–14	Aug 2013	Great Britain F16, Chiswick	Futures	Hard	(United Kingdom) Sean Thornley	(United Kingdom) Liam Broady (United Kingdom) Joshua Ward-Hibbert	6–7^{(5–7)}, 6–2, [6–10]
Win	23–14	Oct 2013	France F18, Nevers	Futures	Hard (i)	(United Kingdom) Sean Thornley	(France) Mathieu Rodrigues (France) Gleb Sakharov	6–3, 6–4
Loss	23–15	Oct 2013	France F19, Saint-Dizier	Futures	Hard (i)	(United Kingdom) Sean Thornley	(Belgium) Germain Gigounon (France) Hugo Nys	6–7^{(4–7)}, 4–6
Win	24–15	Oct 2013	Great Britain F21, Loughborough	Futures	Hard (i)	(United Kingdom) Sean Thornley	(Netherlands) Kevin Griekspoor (Netherlands) Scott Griekspoor	6–3, 6–7^{(3–7)}, [10–5]
Win	25–15	Jan 2014	Great Britain F1, Glasgow	Futures	Hard (i)	(United Kingdom) Sean Thornley	(United Kingdom) Edward Corrie (United Kingdom) Daniel Smethurst	6–3, 6–1
Win	26–15	Jan 2014	Great Britain F2, Sunderland	Futures	Hard (i)	(United Kingdom) Sean Thornley	(United Kingdom) Richard Gabb (United Kingdom) Joshua Ward-Hibbert	6–3, 6–3
Loss	26–16	Jan 2014	Great Britain F3, Sheffield	Futures	Hard (i)	(United Kingdom) Sean Thornley	(United Kingdom) Edward Corrie (United Kingdom) Daniel Smethurst	6–3, 2–6, [8–10]
Loss	26–17	Mar 2014	Great Britain F8, Tipton	Futures	Hard (i)	(United Kingdom) Sean Thornley	(United Kingdom) Lewis Burton (United Kingdom) Marcus Willis	6–4, 6–7^{(5–7)}, [6–10]
Win	27–17	Jul 2014	Great Britain F14, Frinton-on-Sea	Futures	Grass	(United Kingdom) George Coupland	(United Kingdom) Jack Findel-Hawkins (United Kingdom) Toby Mitchell	6–4 ret.
Win	28–17	Aug 2014	Spain F24, Pozoblanco	Futures	Hard	(United Kingdom) Edward Corrie	(United Kingdom) Lewis Burton (United Kingdom) Marcus Willis	6–4, 7–5
Win	29–17	Sep 2014	France F17, Bagnères-de-Bigorre	Futures	Hard	(United Kingdom) Edward Corrie	(France) Enzo Couacaud (France) Laurent Lokoli	6–4, 2–6, [10–5]
Win	30–17	Sep 2014	Great Britain F16, Wrexham	Futures	Hard	(United Kingdom) Edward Corrie	(United Kingdom) Luke Bambridge (United Kingdom) Liam Broady	6–7^{(3–7)}, 6–4, [10–8]
Win	31–17	Oct 2014	Great Britain F17, Manchester	Futures	Hard (i)	(Lithuania) Laurynas Grigelis	(United Kingdom) Sean Thornley (United Kingdom) Darren Walsh	6–4, 6–4
Win	32–17	Dec 2014	Thailand F11, Bangkok	Futures	Hard	(United Kingdom) Brydan Klein	(Thailand) Pruchya Isaro (Thailand) Nuttanon Kadchapanan	3–6, 7–6^{(7–1)}, [10–8]
Loss	32–18	Jan 2015	France F2, Bressuire	Futures	Hard (i)	(United States) Kevin King	(France) Fabrice Martin (India) Purav Raja	3–6, 2–6
Loss	32–19	Feb 2015	Tunisia F6, El Kantaoui	Futures	Hard	(Belgium) Yannik Reuter	(France) Tom Jomby (France) Mick Lescure	4–6, 3–6
Loss	32–20	Mar 2015	Tunisia F8, El Kantaoui	Futures	Hard	(Italy) Claudio Grassi	(Belarus) Yaraslav Shyla (Belarus) Andrei Vasilevski	3–6, 6–4, [6–10]
Loss	32–21	Mar 2015	Great Britain F4, Wirral	Futures	Hard (i)	(United Kingdom) Daniel Cox	(Netherlands) Antal van der Duim (Netherlands) Boy Westerhof	2–6, 6–4, [2–10]
Win	33–21	Apr 2015	Qatar F1, Doha	Futures	Hard	(United Kingdom) James Marsalek	(Czech Republic) Dominik Kellovský (Czech Republic) Jaroslav Pospíšil	4–6, 6–4, [10–4]
Loss	33–22	Jul 2015	Germany F9, Essen	Futures	Clay	(United Kingdom) Neil Pauffley	(Germany) Marvin Netuschil (Germany) Philipp Scholz	6–1, 6–7^{(4–7)}, [6–10]
Loss	33–23	Sep 2015	Great Britain F8, Roehampton	Futures	Hard	(United Kingdom) Neil Pauffley	(Republic of Ireland) David O'Hare (United Kingdom) Joe Salisbury	2–6, 6–4, [5–10]
Loss	33–24	Sep 2015	Great Britain F9, Nottingham	Futures	Hard	(United Kingdom) Daniel Cox	(United Kingdom) Lloyd Glasspool (United Kingdom) Joshua Ward-Hibbert	4–6, 6–3, [7–10]
Loss	33–25	Oct 2015	Sweden F5, Danderyd	Futures	Hard (i)	(Republic of Ireland) Sam Barry	(Republic of Ireland) David O'Hare (United Kingdom) Joe Salisbury	5–7, 7–6^{(7–5)}, [5–10]
Win	34–25	Feb 2016	Great Britain F1, Glasgow	Futures	Hard (i)	(United Kingdom) Daniel Smethurst	(United Kingdom) Scott Clayton (United Kingdom) Jonny O'Mara	6–1, 6–4

== Retirement ==
Rice played his final match against Stefano Napolitano in 2016, and having lost retired and became a tennis coach in London.
