= Tennys Sandgren =

American tennis player (born 1991)

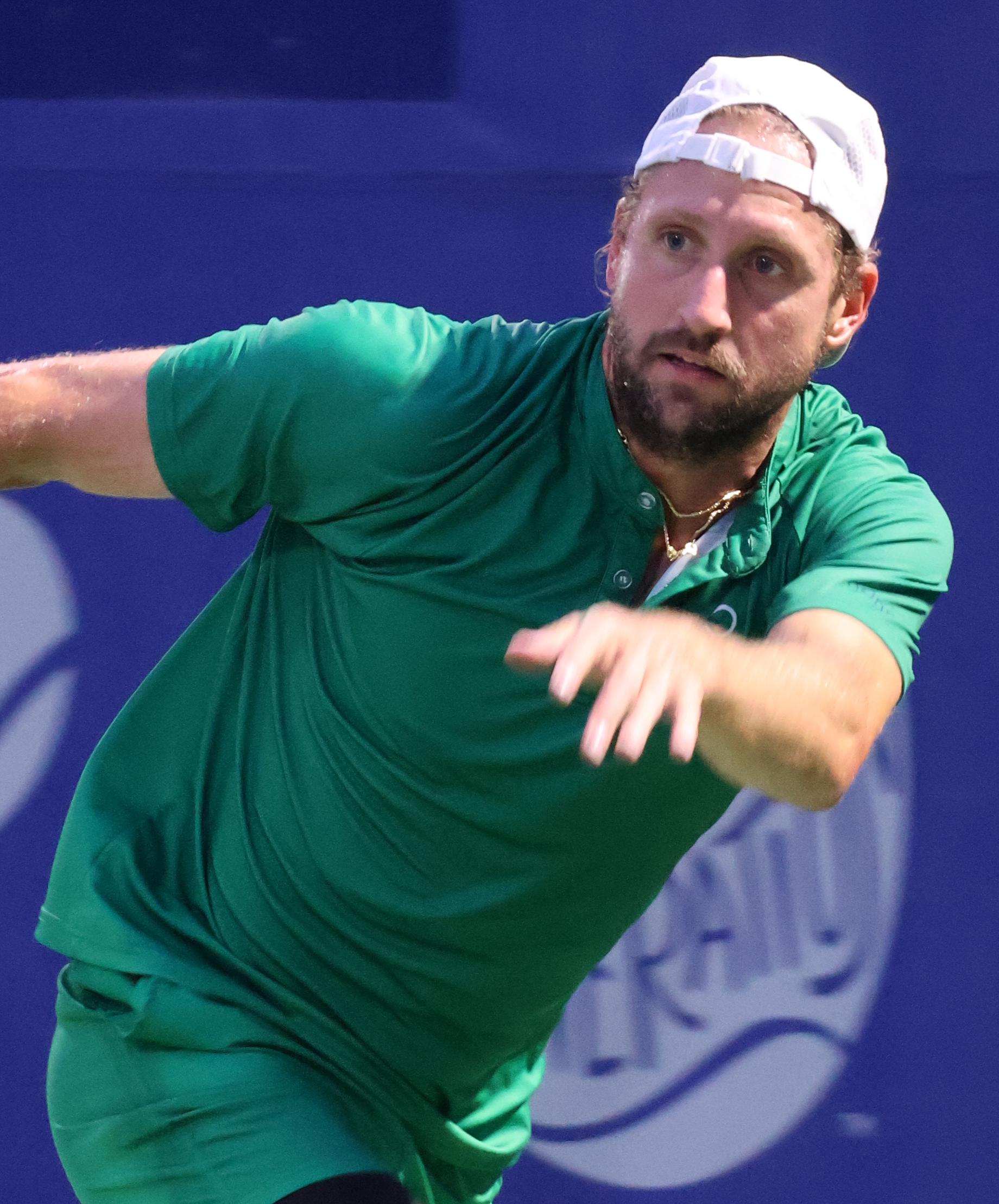
- Sandgren at the 2023 Cary Challenger
- Full name: Tennys Loren Sandgren II
- Country (sports): United States
- Residence: Gallatin, Tennessee, US
- Born: July 22, 1991 (age 34) Gallatin, Tennessee, USA
- Height: 6 ft 2 in (1.88 m)
- Turned pro: 2011
- Retired: April 2024 (last match played)
- Plays: Right-handed (two-handed backhand)
- College: University of Tennessee
- Prize money: US$3,581,949

Singles
- Career record: 47–76
- Career titles: 1
- Highest ranking: No. 41 (14 January 2019)

Grand Slam singles results
- Australian Open: QF (2018, 2020)
- French Open: 2R (2020)
- Wimbledon: 4R (2019)
- US Open: 3R (2019)

Other tournaments
- Olympic Games: 1R (2020)

Doubles
- Career record: 16–27
- Career titles: 0
- Highest ranking: No. 115 (6 January 2014)

Grand Slam doubles results
- Australian Open: 2R (2020, 2021)
- French Open: 2R (2021)
- Wimbledon: 1R (2021)
- US Open: QF (2018)

Other doubles tournaments
- Olympic Games: SF – 4th (2021)
- Last updated on: 15 April 2025.

Tennys Loren Sandgren II (/ˈtɛnɪs ˈsændɡrən/ TEN-iss SAND-grən; born July 22, 1991) is an American former professional tennis player. He has achieved a career-high ATP singles ranking of No. 41 on January 14, 2019. He played two years of college tennis at the University of Tennessee before launching his professional career.

== Early life ==
Sandgren's parents, South African Lia Lourens and American David Sandgren, met at a tennis club in Johannesburg. They married and moved to Tennessee in 1988 with Sandgren's older brother, Davey. Davey Sandgren was also a tennis player who achieved a career-high ATP ranking of 800 in doubles in 2009.

Sandgren, who was named Tennys after his Swedish great-grandfather, was home-schooled and was coached by his mother. He started playing tennis at age five.

== Junior career ==
As a junior, Sandgren compiled a singles win–loss record of 70–38 (and 53–35 in doubles), reaching as high as No. 9 in the combined ITF junior world rankings in April 2009.

=== Junior majors ===
Australian Open: –
French Open: 3R (2009)
Wimbledon: 2R (2009)
US Open: 2R (2009)

== College career ==
Sandgren was a January midseason addition to the Tennessee Volunteers' 2010 tennis roster, joining older brother, Davey, who was a senior All-American on the team. Coached by Sam Winterbotham and Chris Woodruff, the younger Sandgren immediately strengthened the middle of the Vols' singles lineup, going 10–0 in Southeastern Conference play at the No. 4 position to help the team win the SEC regular-season and tournament titles. The team reached the NCAA team finals that year.

As a sophomore, Sandgren reached the semifinals of the NCAA Singles Championships, losing to teammate, roommate and doubles partner Rhyne Williams in three sets. He finished the season with a 37–6 record and his 10–1 record in conference helped the Vols to an SEC regular-season title. He finished his career with a 60–12 singles record (83.33 percent), the third-best career winning percentage in Tennessee history.

He was also a member of the USTA Summer Collegiate Team after his freshman and sophomore seasons.

== Professional career ==
=== 2011–2016: early years, Futures success and first Challenger title ===
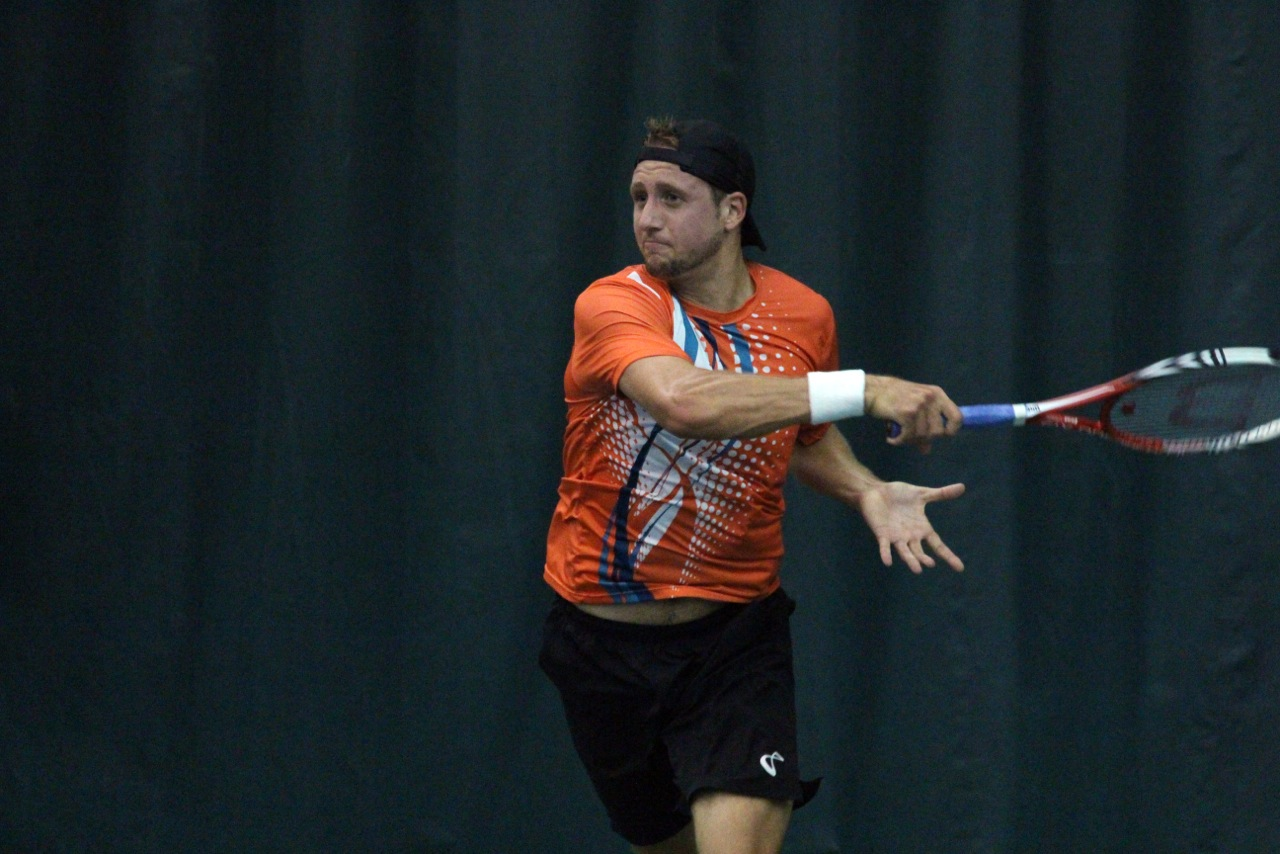
Sandgren in action during the 2013 Challenger of Dallas

Sandgren turned professional in 2011, playing mostly at the ITF Futures level through 2012. In 2013, his ATP ranking remained inside the top 300 for nearly the entire year, allowing him to play on the Challenger Tour for much of the season. In his final tournament of the year, Sandgren won his first final at Challenger level in Champaign to crack the Top 200 for the first time.

In 2014, Sandgren missed half of the year after undergoing hip surgery near the beginning of the season. Upon returning to the court, it took him nearly a year to get back to the Top 250 and the Challenger level. Sandgren returned to the Top 200 in November 2016, when he reached his second career Challenger final in Columbus, almost three years after he first achieved these two milestones.

=== 2017: Challenger Tour breakthrough, top 100 ===
In 2017, Sandgren reached five Challenger finals, winning two of them in Tempe and Savannah. He qualified for his first tournament on the ATP World Tour, the U.S. Men's Clay Court Championships in Houston. Sandgren's success earned him a wildcard berth into the main draw of the French Open. In his Grand Slam debut, Sandgren lost in the first round to Mikhail Kukushkin. A semifinals appearance in Prostějov helped him to break into the top 100 on 11 June 2017. In early August, Sandgren recorded his first two ATP World Tour wins at the Washington Open, including a victory over No. 20 Nick Kyrgios. At the U.S. Open, he lost in the first round to No. 7 Marin Čilić.

=== 2018: Australian Open quarterfinal, maiden ATP final and top 50 debut ===
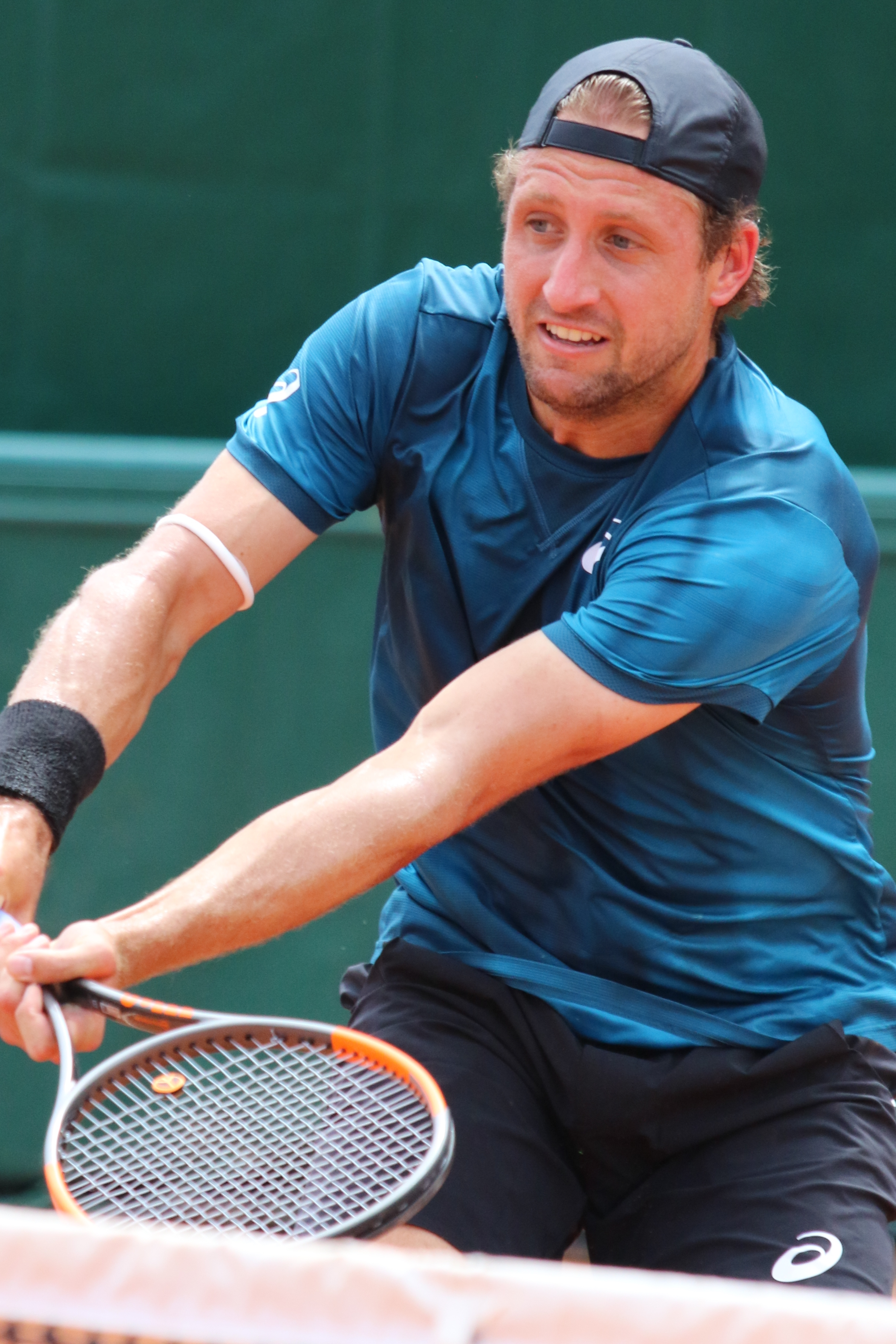
Sandgren at the 2018 French Open

Sandgren began the 2018 season with a first-round loss to Gilles Simon in Pune. He followed with a loss to Casper Ruud in the second qualifying round at the Auckland Open. Sandgren received entry into the main draw of the tournament as a lucky loser following the withdrawal of Kyle Edmund. In the first round of the main draw, he lost in three sets to Hyeon Chung, winner of the inaugural Next Generation ATP Finals in Milan, Italy, two months prior. Making his Australian Open main draw debut, Sandgren won his opening match against French player Jérémy Chardy. In the second round, he defeated 2014 champion and ninth seed Stan Wawrinka, marking his first victory against a Top 10 ranked player. Following a victory over Maximilian Marterer in the third round, Sandgren defeated world No. 5 Dominic Thiem in Sandgren's first five-set match. He lost to Chung in the quarterfinals in straight sets.

In the run up to the quarterfinal he was involved in controversy when he was publicly criticized by Serena Williams for making anti-LGBTQ comments.

As the No. 1 seed, Sandgren was defeated in the first round of qualification for the Argentina Open by world No. 188 Facundo Bagnis. He lost in the second round of the Rio Open, the first round of the Brasil Open, the second round in Indian Wells and the first round in Miami.

At the beginning of the clay season, Sandgren reached his first final on the ATP World Tour at the U.S. Men's Clay Court Championships, but lost to Steve Johnson. He entered the top 50 reaching a career-high of World No. 47 on April 16, 2018.

Sandgren lost in the first round of the Monte Carlo Open to Philipp Kohlschreiber in straight sets. He suffered another first-round loss in Barcelona to Malek Jaziri, also in straight sets. Following a first-round loss against Frances Tiafoe at the Estoril Open, Sandgren suffered his fourth consecutive first round loss, losing in straight sets to Denis Shapovalov at the Madrid Open. After having reached the quarterfinals at the Geneva Open, Sandgren was knocked out in the first round of the French Open by world No. 177 Hubert Hurkacz. He lost in the first round of the doubles tournament in straight sets.

In the first round of Wimbledon, Sandgren was knocked out by eventual champion Novak Djokovic in straight sets, winning only six games.

In the first round of the U.S. Open, Sandgren beat Viktor Troicki in straight sets before losing to Djokovic in four sets in the second round.

=== 2019: First ATP title ===
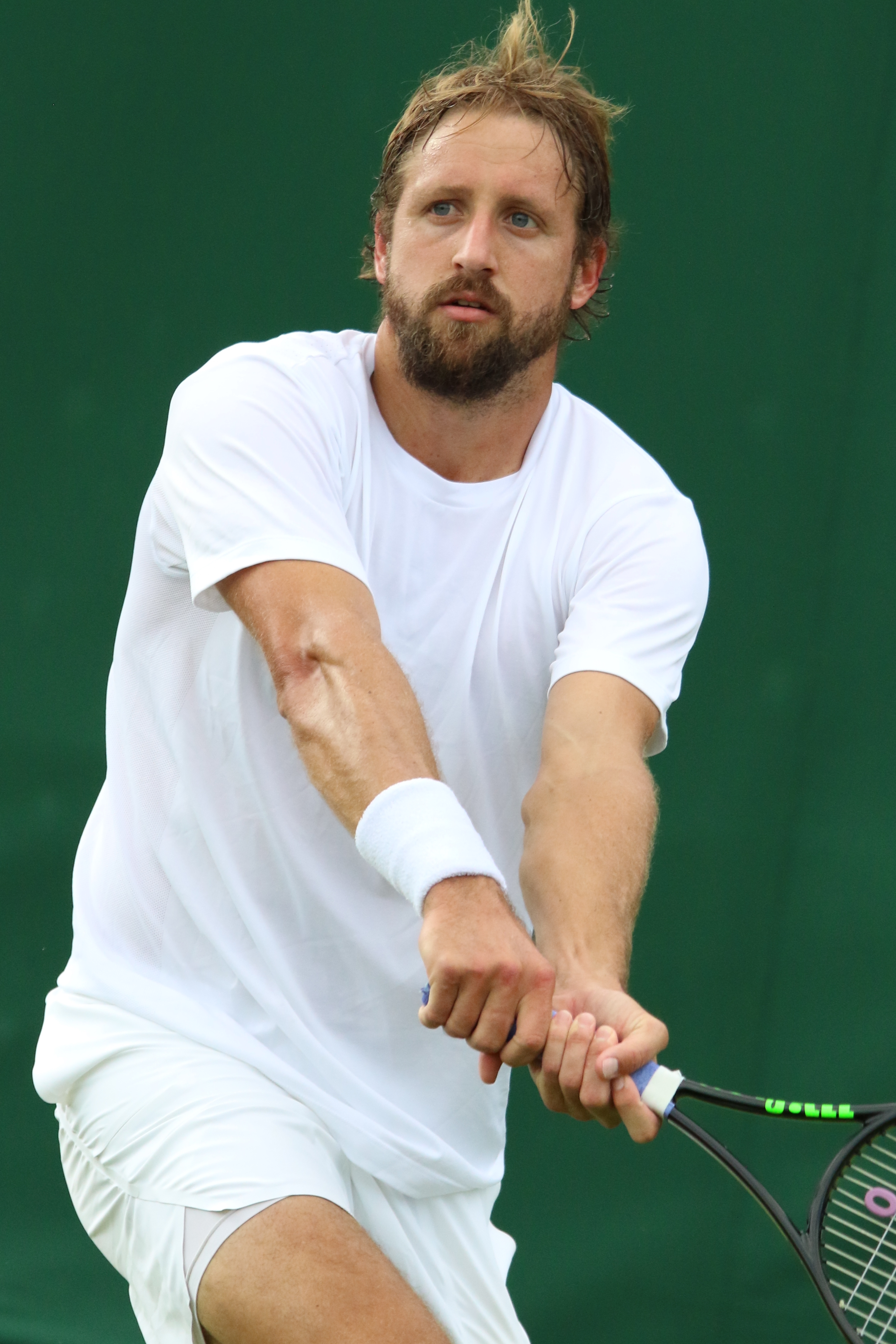
Sandgren at the 2019 Wimbledon Championships

In January, Sandgren won his maiden ATP Tour title at the Auckland Open. He achieved his career high in the singles rankings at World No. 41 on January 14, 2019. However, after the title, Sandgren suffered a 9-match tour-level losing streak, which he finally snapped at Wimbledon, where he reached the fourth round before losing to Sam Querrey. He then reached the quarterfinals at Newport and the third round at the US Open. At the end of the season, a fractured toe kept him inactive, and his ranking sank back out of the top 50.

=== 2020: Second Australian Open quarterfinal, top 50 year-end ranking ===
Sandgren again made it to the quarterfinals of the 2020 Australian Open, where he lost in five tight sets against Roger Federer, after having seven match points.

=== 2021: Loss of form, out of top 50, Olympics debut ===
Having tested positive for COVID-19 in November 2020, Sandgren returned the same result in January 2021, but was deemed to be "non-infectious" and was allowed entry into Australia to compete in the Australian Open where he lost in the first round.

Sandgren qualified to represent the United States at the 2020 Summer Olympics. He lost in the first round in singles but reached the semifinals in doubles partnering Austin Krajicek where they lost to eventual champions Mate Pavić and Nikola Mektić. The pair lost subsequently in the bronze medal match to the New Zealand pair of Marcus Daniell and Michael Venus.

=== 2022: Missed Australian Open due to vaccine mandate ===
Sandgren opted not to participate in the 2022 Australian Open due to the Australian Federal Government's COVID-19 vaccine mandate for visitors to Australia. When Novak Djokovic had his Australian visa rescinded upon arrival to play in the tournament, Sandgren's comment on Twitter in response to the Victorian state government's position on the matter was "LOL trusting the science again".

== Performance timelines ==
Key
W	F	SF	QF	#R	RR	Q#	P#	DNQ	A	Z#	PO	G	S	B	NMS	NTI	P	NH

(W) winner; (F) finalist; (SF) semifinalist; (QF) quarterfinalist; (#R) rounds 4, 3, 2, 1; (RR) round-robin stage; (Q#) qualification round; (P#) preliminary round; (DNQ) did not qualify; (A) absent; (Z#) Davis/Fed Cup Zonal Group (with number indication) or (PO) play-off; (G) gold, (S) silver or (B) bronze Olympic/Paralympic medal; (NMS) not a Masters tournament; (NTI) not a Tier I tournament; (P) postponed; (NH) not held; (SR) strike rate (events won / competed); (W–L) win–loss record.
To avoid confusion and double counting, these charts are updated at the conclusion of a tournament or when the player's participation has ended.

=== Singles ===
Tournament	2009	2010	2011	2012	2013	2014	2015	2016	2017	2018	2019	2020	2021	2022	2023	2024	SR	W–L
Grand Slam tournaments
Australian Open	A	A	A	A	Q2	Q1	Q1	Q2	Q1	QF	1R	QF	1R	A	A	A	0 / 4	8–4
French Open	A	A	A	A	Q1	A	A	A	1R	1R	1R	2R	1R	Q2	A	A	0 / 5	1–5
Wimbledon	A	A	A	A	A	A	A	A	Q2	1R	4R	NH	2R	A	A	A	0 / 3	4–3
US Open	Q1	A	Q1	Q2	Q1	Q1	A	Q1	1R	2R	3R	1R	1R	A	Q2	A	0 / 5	3–5
Win–loss	0–0	0–0	0–0	0–0	0–0	0–0	0–0	0–0	0–2	5–4	5–4	5–3	1–4	0–0	0–0	0–0	0 / 17	16–17
National representation
Summer Olympics	NH			A	NH			A	NH				1R	NH		A	0 / 1	0–1
ATP Masters 1000
Indian Wells Open	A	A	A	A	A	A	A	A	A	2R	1R	NH	2R	1R	Q2	A	0 / 4	2–4
Miami Open	A	A	A	A	A	A	A	A	A	1R	1R	NH	2R	Q1	A	A	0 / 3	1–3
Monte-Carlo Masters	A	A	A	A	A	A	A	A	A	1R	A	NH	A	A	A	A	0 / 1	0–1
Madrid Open	A	A	A	A	A	A	A	A	A	1R	A	NH	Q1	A	A	A	0 / 1	0–1
Italian Open	A	A	A	A	A	A	A	A	A	A	A	1R	Q1	A	A	A	0 / 1	0–1
Canadian Open	A	A	A	A	A	A	A	A	A	A	A	NH	A	A	A	A	0 / 0	0–0
Cincinnati Open	A	A	A	A	A	A	A	A	A	Q1	Q1	3R	Q2	A	A	A	0 / 1	2–1
Shanghai Masters	A	A	A	A	A	A	A	A	A	Q1	A	NH			A	A	0 / 0	0–0
Paris Masters	A	A	A	A	A	A	A	A	A	Q2	A	1R	A	A	A	A	0 / 1	0–1
Win–loss	0–0	0–0	0–0	0–0	0–0	0–0	0–0	0–0	0–0	1–4	0–2	2–3	2–2	0–1	0–0	0–0	0 / 12	5–12
Career statistics
Tournaments	0	0	0	0	0	0	0	0	6	20	18	13	16	3	0	1	77	
Titles	0	0	0	0	0	0	0	0	0	0	1	0	0	0	0	0	1	
Finals	0	0	0	0	0	0	0	0	0	1	1	0	0	0	0	0	2	
Overall win–loss	0–0	0–0	0–0	0–0	0–0	0–0	0–0	0–0	2–6	16–20	13–17	8–13	8–16	0–3	0–0	0–1	47–76	
Year-end ranking	980	1361	540	233	183	660	261	191	96	61	68	49	96	265	259	506	38%	

=== Doubles ===
Tournament	2011	2012	2013	2014	2015	2016	2017	2018	2019	2020	2021	2022	2023	2024	SR	W–L
Grand Slam tournaments
Australian Open	A	A	A	A	A	A	A	A	1R	2R	2R	A	A	A	0 / 3	2–3
French Open	A	A	A	A	A	A	A	1R	A	1R	2R	A	A	A	0 / 3	1–3
Wimbledon	A	A	A	A	A	A	Q1	A	A	NH	1R	A	A	A	0 / 1	0–1
US Open	A	A	A	1R	A	A	A	QF	1R	A	A	A	A	A	0 / 3	3–3
Win–loss	0–0	0–0	0–0	0–1	0–0	0–0	0–0	3–2	0–2	1–2	2–3	0–0	0–0	0–0	0 / 10	6–10
National representation
Summer Olympics	NH	A	NH			A	NH				4th	NH		A	0 / 1	3–2
Career statistics
Tournaments	0	0	0	1	0	0	0	5	8	4	8	0	0	0	26	
Titles	0	0	0	0	0	0	0	0	0	0	0	0	0	0	0	
Finals	0	0	0	0	0	0	0	0	1	0	0	0	0	0	1	
Overall win–loss	0–0	0–0	0–0	0–1	0–0	0–0	0–0	4–5	4–8	2–4	6–9	0–0	0–0	0–0	16–27	
Year-end ranking	650	163	133	316	194	347	444	152	261	229	256	332	558	797	37%	

== Olympic medal matches ==
=== Doubles: 1 (4th place) ===
Result	Year	Tournament	Surface	Partner	Opponents	Score
4th place	2021	2020 Summer Olympics, Japan	Hard	(United States) Austin Krajicek	(New Zealand) Marcus Daniell (New Zealand) Michael Venus	6–7^{(3–7)}, 2–6

== ATP career finals ==
=== Singles: 2 (1 title, 1 runner-up) ===
Legend Grand Slam (0–0) ATP Masters 1000 (0–0) ATP 500 Series (0–0) ATP 250 Series (1–1)	Finals by surface Hard (1–0) Clay (0–1) Grass (0–0)	Finals by setting Outdoor (1–1) Indoor (0–0)

Result	W–L	Date	Tournament	Tier	Surface	Opponent	Score
Loss	0–1	Apr 2018	U.S. Men's Clay Court Championships, United States	250 Series	Clay	(United States) Steve Johnson	6–7^{(2–7)}, 6–2, 4–6
Win	1–1	Jan 2019	Auckland Open, New Zealand	250 Series	Hard	(United Kingdom) Cameron Norrie	6–4, 6–2

=== Doubles: 1 (1 runner-up) ===
Legend Grand Slam (0–0) ATP Masters 1000 (0–0) ATP 500 Series (0–0) ATP 250 Series (0–1)	Finals by surface Hard (0–1) Clay (0–0) Grass (0–0)	Finals by setting Outdoor (0–1) Indoor (0–0)

Result	W–L	Date	Tournament	Tier	Surface	Partner	Opponents	Score
Loss	0–1	Aug 2019	Winston-Salem Open, United States	250 Series	Hard	(United States) Nicholas Monroe	(Poland) Łukasz Kubot (Brazil) Marcelo Melo	7–6^{(8–6)}, 1–6, [3–10]

== ATP Challengers and ITF Futures finals ==
=== Singles: 27 (15–12) ===
Legend ATP Challenger (4–5) ITF Futures (11–7)	Finals by surface Hard (13–6) Clay (2–6) Grass (0–0)

Result	W–L	Date	Tournament	Tier	Surface	Opponent	Score
Win	1–0	Jul 2011	USA F20, Godfrey	Futures	Hard	(Czech Republic) Rudolf Siwy	6–2, 7–5
Win	2–0	Aug 2011	USA F21, Decatur	Futures	Hard	(Lebanon) Bassam Beidas	6–3, 6–1
Win	3–0	Mar 2012	USA F7, Calabasas	Futures	Hard	(United States) Daniel Kosakowski	6–3, 7–5
Win	4–0	Apr 2012	USA F10, Little Rock	Futures	Hard	(Australia) John Peers	6–1, 7–6^{(8–6)}
Loss	4–1	May 2012	USA F12, Orange Park	Futures	Clay	(Austria) Gerald Melzer	6–7^{(5–7)}, 3–6
Win	5–1	May 2012	USA F13, Tampa	Futures	Clay	(United States) Bjorn Fratangelo	6–1, 6–3
Win	6–1	Sep 2012	Canada F9, Markham	Futures	Hard (i)	(Canada) Peter Polansky	6–4, 6–3
Loss	6–2	Jul 2013	Canada F4, Saskatoon	Futures	Hard	(United States) Austin Krajicek	5–7, 6–7^{(6–8)}
Win	7–2	Nov 2013	Champaign, United States	Challenger	Hard (i)	(Australia) Sam Groth	3–6, 6–3, 7–6^{(7–5)}
Win	8–2	Mar 2015	Canada F1, Gatineau	Futures	Hard (i)	(Canada) Philip Bester	6–3, 7–6^{(9–7)}
Loss	8–3	Mar 2015	Canada F2, Sherbrooke	Futures	Hard (i)	(United Kingdom) Edward Corrie	6–3, 1–6, 3–6
Loss	8–4	May 2015	USA F16, Tampa	Futures	Clay	(Brazil) Thales Turini	2–6, 5–7
Loss	8–5	Jun 2015	USA F16A, Winston-Salem	Futures	Clay	(Croatia) Matija Pecotić	2–6, 3–6
Win	9–5	Jun 2015	USA F16B, Charlottesville	Futures	Hard	(United States) Ernesto Escobedo	6–4, 6–4
Loss	9–6	Sep 2015	Canada F9, Toronto	Futures	Clay	(Canada) Frank Dancevic	5–7, 3–6
Loss	9–7	Apr 2016	USA F12, Memphis	Futures	Hard	(Canada) Denis Shapovalov	6–7^{(4–7)}, 6–7^{(4–7)}
Win	10–7	Jun 2016	USA F17, Charlottesville	Futures	Hard	(United States) Dennis Nevolo	6–3, 6–3
Win	11–7	Jul 2016	USA F24, Godfrey	Futures	Hard	(Argentina) Facundo Mena	6–0, 6–4
Win	12–7	Jul 2016	USA F25, Edwardsville	Futures	Hard	(Australia) Marc Polmans	7–6^{(7–4)}, 1–6, 6–3
Loss	12–8	Nov 2016	Columbus, United States	Challenger	Hard (i)	(United States) Stefan Kozlov	1–6, 6–2, 2–6
Win	13–8	Feb 2017	Tempe, United States	Challenger	Hard	(Serbia) Nikola Milojević	4–6, 6–0, 6–3
Loss	13–9	Apr 2017	Sarasota, United States	Challenger	Clay	(United States) Frances Tiafoe	3–6, 4–6
Win	14–9	May 2017	Savannah, United States	Challenger	Clay	(Brazil) João Pedro Sorgi	6–4, 6–3
Loss	14–10	Oct 2017	Tiburon, United States	Challenger	Hard	(United Kingdom) Cameron Norrie	2–6, 3–6
Loss	14–11	Nov 2017	Charlottesville, United States	Challenger	Hard (i)	(United States) Tim Smyczek	7–6^{(7–5)}, 2–6, 2–6
Loss	14–12	Apr 2019	Sarasota, United States	Challenger	Clay	(United States) Tommy Paul	3–6, 4–6
Win	15–12	Oct 2022	Las Vegas, United States	Challenger	Hard	(United States) Stefan Kozlov	7–5, 6–3

=== Doubles: 28 (18–10) ===
Legend ATP Challenger (9–7) ITF Futures (9–3)	Finals by surface Hard (15–9) Clay (3–1) Grass (0–0)

Result	W–L	Date	Tournament	Tier	Surface	Partner	Opponents	Score
Win	1–0	Jul 2010	USA F17, Pittsburgh	Futures	Clay	(United States) Rhyne Williams	(United States) Greg Ouellette (Canada) Vasek Pospisil	3–6, 6–3, [11–9]
Win	2–0	Sep 2011	Canada F6, Toronto	Futures	Hard	(United States) Rhyne Williams	(United States) Chase Buchanan (United States) Peter Kobelt	6–1, 6–3
Loss	2–1	Sep 2011	Canada F7, Markham	Futures	Hard (i)	(United States) Rhyne Williams	(Canada) Milan Pokrajac (Canada) Peter Polansky	6–4, 3–6, [8–10]
Win	3–1	Feb 2012	USA F5, Brownsville	Futures	Hard	(United States) Rhyne Williams	(Philippines) Ruben Gonzales (United States) Chris Kwon	7–6^{(7–4)}, 6–0
Win	4–1	Mar 2012	USA F6, Harlingen	Futures	Hard	(United States) Rhyne Williams	(Italy) Thomas Fabbiano (China) Wu Di	6–7^{(6–8)}, 7–5, [10–6]
Win	5–1	Apr 2012	USA F10, Little Rock	Futures	Hard	(United States) Greg Ouellette	(New Zealand) Marvin Barker (United Kingdom) Edward Corrie	4–6, 7–6^{(7–2)}, [10–8]
Loss	5–2	Jul 2012	Lexington, United States	Challenger	Hard	(United States) Rhyne Williams	(United States) Austin Krajicek (Australia) John Peers	1–6, 6–7^{(4–7)}
Loss	5–3	Sep 2012	Canada F8, Toronto	Futures	Hard	(United States) Chase Buchanan	(Hungary) Márton Fucsovics (Croatia) Ante Pavić	2–6, 4–6
Win	6–3	Sep 2011	Canada F9, Markham	Futures	Hard (i)	(United States) Chase Buchanan	(Australia) Carsten Ball (Canada) Peter Polansky	6–2, 4–6, [10–7]
Win	7–3	Oct 2012	Sacramento, United States	Challenger	Hard	(United States) Rhyne Williams	(United States) Devin Britton (United States) Austin Krajicek	4–6, 6–4, [12–10]
Loss	7–4	Jan 2013	Maui, United States	Challenger	Hard	(United States) Rhyne Williams	(Chinese Taipei) Lee Hsin-han (Chinese Taipei) Peng Hsien-yin	7–6^{(7–1)}, 2–6, [5–10]
Loss	7–5	Feb 2013	Dallas, United States	Challenger	Hard (i)	(United States) Rhyne Williams	(United States) Alex Kuznetsov (Germany) Mischa Zverev	4–6, 7–6^{(7–4)}, [5–10]
Win	8–5	May 2013	Tallahassee, United States	Challenger	Clay	(United States) Austin Krajicek	(Australia) Greg Jones (Canada) Peter Polansky	1–6, 6–2, [10–8]
Win	9–5	Jul 2013	Canada F4, Saskatoon	Futures	Hard	(United States) Austin Krajicek	(Moldova) Roman Borvanov (Canada) Milan Pokrajac	6–4, 3–6, [10–6]
Win	10–5	Sep 2013	İzmir, Turkey	Challenger	Hard	(United States) Austin Krajicek	(United Kingdom) Brydan Klein (Australia) Dane Propoggia	7–6^{(7–4)}, 6–4
Loss	10–6	Nov 2013	Champaign, United States	Challenger	Hard (i)	(United States) Austin Krajicek	(United Kingdom) Edward Corrie (United Kingdom) Daniel Smethurst	6–7^{(5–7)}, 6–0, [7–10]
Win	11–6	Jan 2014	Nouméa, New Caledonia	Challenger	Hard	(United States) Austin Krajicek	(Croatia) Ante Pavić (Slovenia) Blaž Rola	7–6^{(7–4)}, 6–3
Win	12–6	Jan 2015	Nouméa, New Caledonia	Challenger	Hard	(United States) Austin Krajicek	(United States) Jarmere Jenkins (United States) Bradley Klahn	7–6^{(7–2)}, 6–7^{(5–7)}, [10–5]
Loss	12–7	Jun 2015	USA F16A, Winston-Salem	Futures	Hard	(United States) Rhyne Williams	(Chile) Julio Peralta (United States) Matt Seeberger	6–3, 3–6, [8–10]
Win	13–7	Sep 2015	Canada F9, Toronto	Futures	Clay	(United States) Chase Buchanan	(Germany) Sami Reinwein (United States) Justin S. Shane	6–1, 6–3
Win	14–7	Nov 2015	Charlottesville, United States	Challenger	Hard (i)	(United States) Chase Buchanan	(Canada) Peter Polansky (Canada) Adil Shamasdin	3–6, 6–4, [10–5]
Win	15–7	Apr 2016	USA F13, Little Rock	Futures	Hard	(United States) Ryan Lipman	(United States) Nick Chappell (United States) Dane Webb	6–3, 6–2
Win	16–7	Nov 2016	Champaign, United States	Challenger	Hard (i)	(United States) Austin Krajicek	(United Kingdom) Luke Bambridge (United Kingdom) Liam Broady	7–6^{(7–4)}, 7–6^{(7–2)}
Loss	16–8	Jan 2017	Maui, United States	Challenger	Hard	(United States) Bradley Klahn	(United States) Austin Krajicek (United States) Jackson Withrow	4–6, 3–6
Loss	16–9	Nov 2018	Knoxville, United States	Challenger	Hard (i)	(United States) Hunter Reese	(Japan) Toshihide Matsui (Denmark) Frederik Nielsen	6–7^{(6–8)}, 5–7
Win	17–9	Jan 2022	Columbus, United States	Challenger	Hard (i)	(Denmark) Mikael Torpegaard	(Switzerland) Luca Margaroli (Japan) Yasutaka Uchiyama	5–7, 6–4, [10–5]
Win	18–9	Nov 2022	Knoxville, United States	Challenger	Hard (i)	(United States) Hunter Reese	(United States) Martin Damm (United States) Mitchell Krueger	6–7^{(4–7)}, 7–6^{(7–3)}, [10–5]
Loss	18–10	Apr 2024	Sarasota, United States	Challenger	Clay	(United States) Ethan Quinn	(United States) Tristan Boyer (United Kingdom) Oliver Crawford	4–6, 2–6

== Top 10 wins ==
- He has a 4–10 record against players who were, at the time the match was played, ranked in the top 10.

Season	2018	2019	2020	Total
Wins	2	1	1	4

#	Player	Rank	Event	Surface	Rd	Score	TSR
2018
1.	(Switzerland) Stan Wawrinka	8	Australian Open, Australia	Hard	2R	6–2, 6–1, 6–4	97
2.	(Austria) Dominic Thiem	5	Australian Open, Australia	Hard	4R	6–2, 4–6, 7–6^{(7–4)}, 6–7^{(7–9)}, 6–3	97
2019
3.	(Italy) Fabio Fognini	10	Wimbledon, United Kingdom	Grass	3R	6–3, 7–6^{(14–12)}, 6–3	94
2020
4.	(Italy) Matteo Berrettini	8	Australian Open, Australia	Hard	2R	7–6^{(9–7)}, 6–4, 4–6, 2–6, 7–5	100

== World TeamTennis ==
Sandgren has played two seasons with World TeamTennis starting in 2015 when he debuted in the league with the California Dream and then again in 2018 with the Washington Kastles. It was announced that he will join the Orlando Storm during the 2020 season set to begin July 12.

Sandgren posted a 9–6 singles record throughout the season, posting a winning percentage (games won-lost) of 53%, the second-highest in the league. He also paired up with Ken Skupski in men's doubles as well as Jessica Pegula in mixed doubles to help the Storm earn a No. 3 seed in the WTT Playoffs. The Storm would ultimately fall to the Chicago Smash in the semifinals.

== Personal life ==
Sandgren married his girlfriend Christianna Burkee on December 2, 2023.
