= Devin Britton =

American professional tennis player

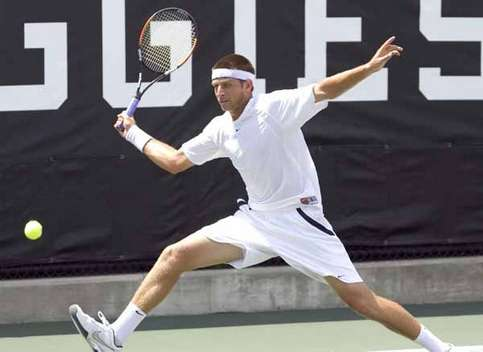
- Devin Britton during the 2009 NCAA Men's Singles Tennis Championship match.
- Full name: Devin Reade Britton
- Country (sports): United States
- Residence: Brandon, Mississippi
- Born: March 17, 1991 (age 35) Jackson, Mississippi
- Height: 6 ft 4 in (1.93 m)
- Turned pro: 2009
- Plays: Right-handed (two-handed backhand)
- College: Ole Miss Rebels
- Prize money: $81,276

Singles
- Career record: 0–3 (ATP World Tour and Grand Slam main draw matches)
- Career titles: 0
- Highest ranking: No. 378 (January 7, 2013)

Grand Slam singles results
- US Open: 1R (2009)

Doubles
- Career record: 0–0 (ATP World Tour and Grand Slam main draw matches)
- Career titles: 0
- Highest ranking: No. 119 (January 7, 2013)

Grand Slam mixed doubles results
- US Open: 1R (2009)
- Last updated on: September 2, 2012.

Devin Britton (born March 17, 1991) is an American professional tennis player. He is from Brandon, Mississippi. He is currently an assistant coach for the Ole Miss Rebels men's tennis team.

== Tennis career ==
=== Juniors ===
Britton's most notable ITF junior tournament win was in June 2008, when he captured the International Grass Courts Championships. Also, in the summer of 2008 at the U.S. Open Junior Championships, he advanced to the finals match – making him the first ever qualifying wildcard to make a final where he lost to Grigor Dimitrov.

As a junior Britton compiled a singles win–loss record of 54–36 (and 92–29 in doubles), reaching as high as No. 13 in the junior world combined rankings in July 2009.

Junior Slam results – Singles:

Australian Open: -
French Open: 1R (2009)
Wimbledon: SF (2009)
US Open: F (2008)

Junior Slam results – Doubles:

Australian Open: -
French Open: 3R (2009)
Wimbledon: QF (2009)
US Open: QF (2007)

=== College ===
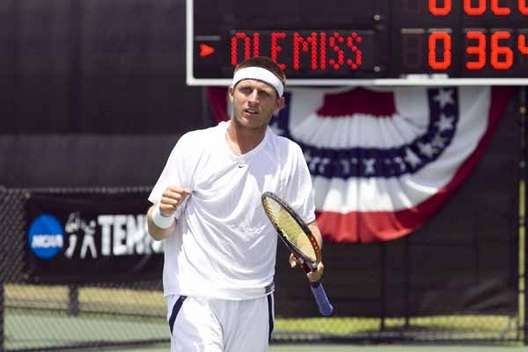

==== NCAA Men's Singles Title ====
Britton, at the age of 18, won the 2009 NCAA Men's Tennis singles championship as a freshman. He is the first Ole Miss men's tennis player to ever win an NCAA men's singles championship.

Britton defeated Moritz Baumann of Wisconsin in the first round then beat Dominic Inglot of Virginia in the second round. In the third round, Britton sent Rice senior Bruno Rosa out of the tournament in straight sets, and then he beat Stanford’s Alex Clayton in the quarterfinals. To advance to the NCAA championship match, he defeated Blake Strode of Arkansas with a straight set win. To win the championship, Britton defeated Ohio State senior Steven Moneke, making him the first American-born player to win the NCAA singles title since Alex Kim of Stanford in 2000. The championship win also makes him the first freshman since 19-year-old Cecil Mamiit of USC in 1996 and the first non-seeded player since Luke Smith of UNLV in 1997. He is the youngest of the three freshmen to win the singles title, including John McEnroe, who was 19 when he won it for Stanford in 1978 – making him the youngest player ever to win the national championship.

=== Leaving college ===
After only one semester in college, Britton announced on July 1, 2009, that he would not return to Mississippi but would instead turn professional and had already signed a contract with a sports agency, Octagon Worldwide. He received a wildcard into the 2009 U.S. Open where he played #1 seeded and ranked Roger Federer in the opening round. Federer won the match in straight sets 6-1, 6-3, 7-5.

=== Retirement ===
Britton stopped playing in ATP Tour after the 2013 season after 5 years. Post tennis, he returned to college and graduated in 2016 from Ole Miss with a degree in managerial finance. Following his graduation, he began as an assistant coach, and was later promoted to head coach. He remains as head coach as of 2026.

==== Awards ====
- Britton was named the Southeast Region Rookie of the Year by the Intercollegiate Tennis Association.
- Britton is a two-time SEC Player of the Week for the 2008–2009 season.
- Britton earned All-SEC second team honors and made the SEC All-Freshman Team for the 2008–2009 season.

== ATP career finals ==
=== Doubles: 3 (2–1) ===
Legend ATP Challenger Tour	Finals by surface Hard (2–1) Clay (0–0) Grass (0–0) Carpet (0–0)

Result	No.	Date	Tournament	Surface	Partner	Opponents	Score
Winner	1.	July 7, 2012	Winnetka, United States	Hard	(United States) Jeff Dadamo	(Australia) John-Patrick Smith (Australia) John Peers	1–6, 6–2, [10–6]
Runner-up	1.	October 7, 2012	Sacramento, United States	Hard	(United States) Austin Krajicek	(United States) Tennys Sandgren (United States) Rhyne Williams	6–4, 4–6, [10–12]
Winner	2.	November 17, 2012	Champaign, United States	Hard	(United States) Austin Krajicek	(South Africa) Jean Andersen (South Africa) Izak van der Merwe	6–3, 6–3

== Personal life ==
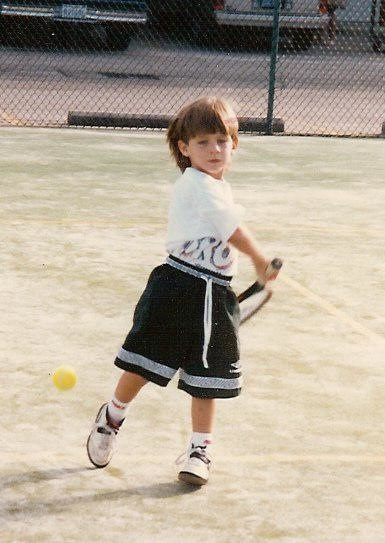
Britton at age 4.

Britton began playing tennis when he was 4 years old. Britton was home-schooled starting in the seventh grade. Because he was traveling extensively for tennis, he completed his high school education through the Alpha Omega Online Academy.

Devin’s parents are Scott and Cindy Britton. He is the youngest of three children. He has two older sisters, Tara Chez and Katie.

Devin trained at the IMG Academy/Bollettieri Tennis Academy in Bradenton, Florida where he was coached by Nick Bollettieri, David Amye and Gabe Jaramillo. At Ole Miss, he was coached by Billy Chadwick. His serve and volley style is rare among modern players.
