= Joshua Milton =

British tennis player & coach (born 1989)

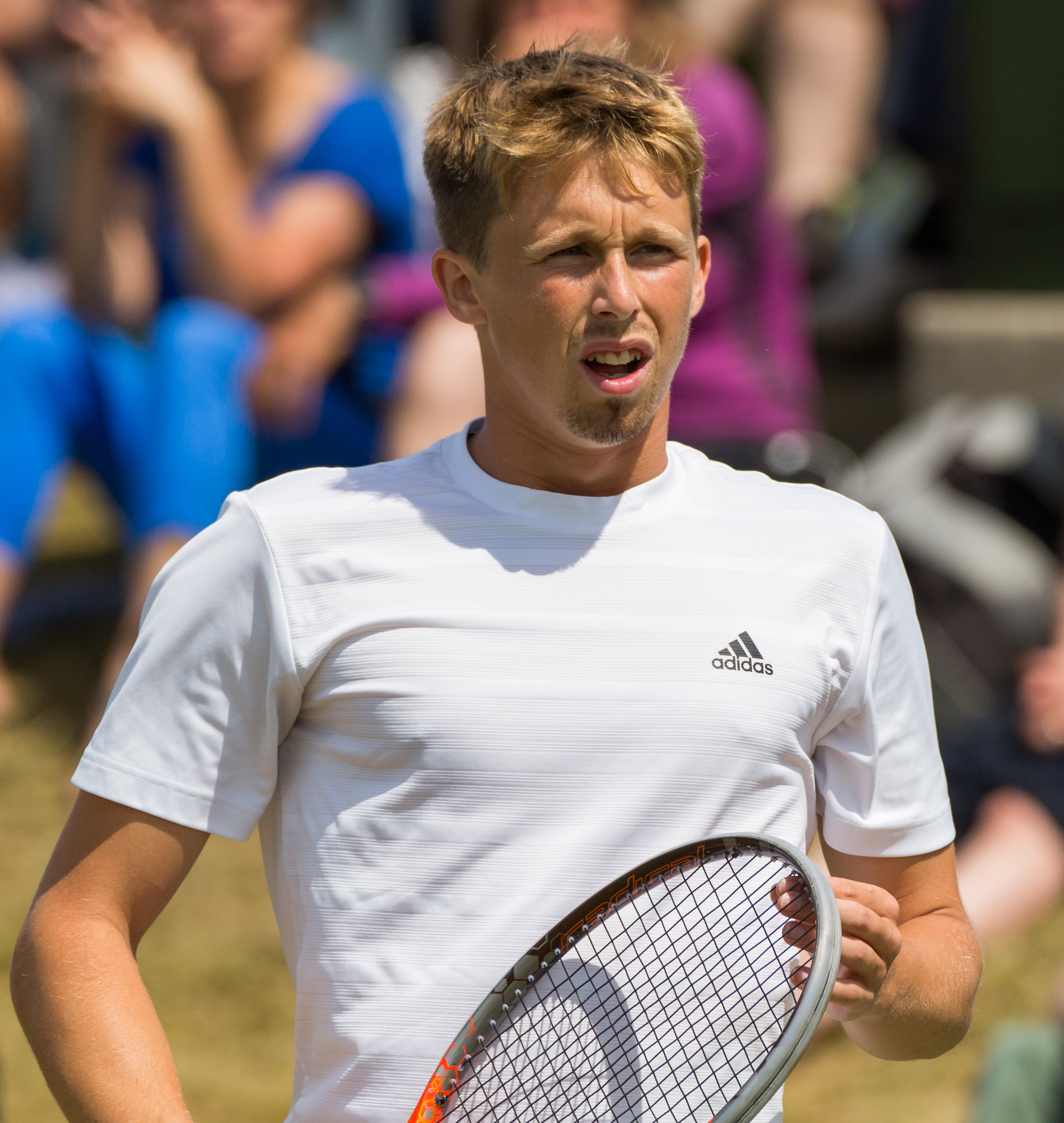
- Country (sports): (United Kingdom) Great Britain; Wales
- Born: 14 October 1989 (age 36) Cardiff, Wales
- Plays: Right-handed
- Prize money: $141,390

Singles
- Highest ranking: No. 284 (22 June 2015)

Grand Slam singles results
- Wimbledon: Q2 (2009, 2015)

Doubles
- Highest ranking: No. 498 (25 July 2011)

Grand Slam doubles results
- Wimbledon: Q1 (2010)

Joshua Milton (born 14 October 1989) is a British tennis coach and former professional player. Based in San Diego, Milton has been the traveling coach of Dan Evans. As a player he was a Welsh number one and represented Wales at the 2010 Commonwealth Games.

== Biography ==
Born in Cardiff, Milton was a student at Stanwell School in Penarth and lived in the village of Rhoose.

=== Tennis career ===
Milton won eight ITF Circuit titles during his career, five in singles and three in doubles. He participated in the singles qualifying draw at the Wimbledon Championships on five occasions, twice reaching the second round. On the ATP Tour he also made several qualifying appearances, including at the 2016 Indian Wells Masters.

At the 2010 Commonwealth Games in Delhi, Milton had a second round win over Ross Hutchins of England, before falling to number-two seed Peter Luczak at the quarter-finals stage, in three sets. With partner Chris Lewis he was also a quarter-finalist in the doubles.

In 2011 he became the first Welshman since Gerald Battrick in the 1970s to reach the top-four in the British rankings.

In 2016, he recorded his best ever result in an ATP Challenger Tour event in Bangkok, reaching the Quarter-Final as a qualifier, before finally being defeated by former top-10 star Mikhail Youzhny.

== See also ==
- Wales at the 2010 Commonwealth Games
