= 2017 Australian Open – Main draw wildcard entries =

- Date: November 2016 – January 2017
- Edition: 105th
- Category: Grand Slam (ITF)
- Location: (various) United States; Zhuhai, Guangdong, China; Melbourne, Victoria, Australia
- Australian Open – Main draw wildcard entries

The 2017 Australian Open wildcard playoffs and entries are a group of events and internal selections to choose the eight men and eight women singles wildcard entries for the 2017 Australian Open, as well as seven male and seven female doubles teams plus eight mixed-doubles teams.

== Wildcard entries ==
=== Men's singles ===
Country	Name	Method of Qualification
USA	Michael Mmoh	American Wildcard Challenge
UZB	Denis Istomin	Asia-Pacific Wildcard Playoff
FRA	Quentin Halys	French internal selection
AUS	Omar Jasika	Australian Wildcard Playoff
AUS	Sam Groth	Australian internal selection
AUS	Alex De Minaur	Australian internal selection
AUS	Andrew Whittington	Australian internal selection
AUS	Christopher O'Connell	Australian internal selection

=== Women's singles ===
Country	Name	Method of Qualification
USA	Kayla Day	American Wildcard Challenge
THA	Luksika Kumkhum	Asia-Pacific Wildcard Playoff
FRA	Myrtille Georges	French internal selection
AUS	Jaimee Fourlis	Australian Wildcard Playoff
AUS	Destanee Aiava	Australian 18/u Champion
AUS	Lizette Cabrera	Australian internal selection
AUS	Ashleigh Barty	Australian internal selection
AUS	Arina Rodionova	Australian internal selection

=== Men's doubles ===
Country	Name	Method of Qualification
TPE; TPE	Hsieh Cheng-peng; Yang Tsung-hua	Asian Wildcard Playoff
AUS; AUS	Matthew Barton; Matthew Ebden	Australian internal selection
AUS; AUS	Alex Bolt; Bradley Mousley	Australian internal selection
AUS; AUS	Alex De Minaur; Max Purcell	Australian internal selection
AUS; AUS	Marc Polmans; Andrew Whittington	Australian internal selection
AUS; AUS	Matt Reid; John-Patrick Smith	Australian internal selection
AUS; AUS	Luke Saville; Jordan Thompson	Australian internal selection

=== Women's doubles ===
Country	Name	Method of Qualification
TPE; JPN	Chan Chin-wei; Junri Namigata	Asian Wildcard Playoff
AUS; AUS	Jessica Moore; Storm Sanders	Australian Wildcard Challenge
AUS; AUS	Destanee Aiava; Alicia Smith	Australian Wildcard Playoff
AUS; AUS	Ashleigh Barty; Casey Dellacqua	Australian internal selection
AUS; AUS	Alison Bai; Lizette Cabrera	Australian internal selection
AUS; AUS	Kimberly Birrell; Priscilla Hon	Australian internal selection
AUS; AUS	Ellen Perez; Olivia Tjandramulia	Australian internal selection

=== Mixed doubles ===
Country	Name	Method of Qualification
AUS; AUS	Destanee Aiava; Marc Polmans	Australian internal selection
AUS; AUS	Casey Dellacqua; Matt Reid	Australian internal selection
AUS; AUS	Daria Gavrilova; Luke Saville	Australian internal selection
SUI; IND	Martina Hingis; Leander Paes	Australian internal selection
FRA; FRA	Pauline Parmentier; Nicolas Mahut	Australian internal selection
AUS; AUS	Sally Peers; John Peers	Australian internal selection
AUS; AUS	Arina Rodionova; John-Patrick Smith	Australian internal selection
AUS; AUS	Samantha Stosur; Sam Groth	Australian internal selection

== US Wildcard Challenge ==
The US awarded a wildcard to the man and woman that earned the most ranking points across a group of three Challenger/ITF hardcourt events in the United States in October and November 2016. For the men, it was the Charlottesville, Knoxville and Champaign Challengers and for the women, it was Macon, Scottsdale and Waco. Only the best two results from the three challengers were taken into account with the winners being teenagers Michael Mmoh and Kayla Day. These players were announced on 18 November 2016.

=== Men's standings ===
Place	Player	Charlottesville	Knoxville	Champaign	Total Results	Best Two Results
1	Michael Mmoh	7	80	15	102	95
2	Reilly Opelka	80	–	7	87	87
3	Jared Donaldson	15	29	29	73	58
4	Mackenzie McDonald	29	15	–	44	44
5	Stefan Kozlov	–	29	7	36	36

=== Women's standings ===
Place	Player	Macon	Scottsdale	Waco	Total Results	Best Two Results
1	Kayla Day	80	29	–	109	109
2	Grace Min	29	15	48	92	77
3	Danielle Collins	48	1	15	64	63
4	Kristie Ahn	1	48	1	50	49
5	Jennifer Brady	8	29	1	38	37
5	Samantha Crawford	8	1	29	38	37

== Asia-Pacific Wildcard Playoff ==
The Asia-Pacific Australian Open Wildcard Play-off featured 16-players in the men's and women's singles draws and took place from 28 November to 4 December 2016 at Hengqin International Tennis Centre in Zhuhai, China.

=== Men's singles ===
==== Seeds ====
1. (Uzbekistan) Denis Istomin (winner)
2. (South Korea) Lee Duck-hee (final)
3. (China) Wu Di (semifinals)
4. (China) Li Zhe (first round)

5. (India) Prajnesh Gunneswaran (semifinals)
6. (South Korea) Kwon Soon-woo (first round)
7. (China) Gao Xin (first round)
8. (India) Vijay Sundar Prashanth (quarterfinals)

==== Draw ====
First round
1	(Uzbekistan) D Istomin	6	6
WC	(China) F Sun	2	0
7	(China) X Gao	0^{r}
LL	(China) Wu Hao	1
4	(China) Zhe Li	6^{2}	4
Q	(Philippines) FC Alcantara	7^{7}	6
5	(India) P Gunneswaran	4	6	6
WC	(China) Gong Xiao	6	4	2
Q	(China) Li Zhaotai	6^{6}	0
8	(India) VS Prashanth	7^{8}	6
WC	(Chinese Taipei) T-h Yang	2	3
3	(China) D Wu	6	6
Q	(Philippines) R Gonzales	6	6
6	(South Korea) S-w Kwon	3	4
Q	(China) Qi Xi	2	6	1
2	(South Korea) D-h Lee	6	4	6

Quarterfinals
1	(Uzbekistan) D Istomin	6	6
LL	(China) H Wu	2	2
Q	(Philippines) FC Alcantara	4	1
5	(India) P Gunneswaran	6	6
8	(India) VS Prashanth	6	3	4
3	(China) D Wu	4	6	6
Q	(Philippines) R Gonzales	6	3	4
2	(South Korea) D-h Lee	4	6	6

Semifinals
1	(Uzbekistan) D Istomin	6	1	11
5	(India) P Gunneswaran	2	6	9
3	(China) D Wu	2	7	5
2	(South Korea) D-h Lee	6	5	7

Final
1	(Uzbekistan) D Istomin	7	6
2	(South Korea) D-h Lee	5	1

=== Women's singles ===
==== Seeds ====
1. (Chinese Taipei) Hsieh Su-wei (quarterfinals, withdrew)
2. (Chinese Taipei) Chang Kai-chen (final)
3. (Thailand) Luksika Kumkhum (winner)
4. (Uzbekistan) Sabina Sharipova (first round)

5. (Japan) Junri Namigata (semifinals)
6. (China) Lu Jingjing (quarterfinals)
7. (Japan) Kyōka Okamura (first round)
8. (India) Ankita Raina (quarterfinals)

==== Draw ====
First round
1	(Chinese Taipei) S-w Hsieh	6	6
(Thailand) P Plipuech	3	4
5/WC	(Japan) J Namigata	6	6
Q	(Chinese Taipei) C-w Hsu	4	2
3	(Thailand) L Kumkhum	6	6
WC	(China) Chen Siyu	0	0
7	(Japan) K Okamura	4	3
(Thailand) V Wongteanchai	6	6
Q	(Singapore) S Tan	1	2
6	(China) J Lu	6	6
Q	(China) X You	6	5	6
4	(Uzbekistan) S Sharipova	1	7	1
Q	(China) J Kang	2	1
8/WC	(India) A Raina	6	6
WC	(China) F Xun	5	3
2	(Chinese Taipei) K-c Chang	7	6

Quarterfinals
1	(Chinese Taipei) S-w Hsieh
5/WC	(Japan) J Namigata	w/o
3	(Thailand) L Kumkhum	6	6
(Thailand) V Wongteanchai	3	0
6	(China) J Lu	6^{5}	5
Q	(China) X You	7^{7}	7
8/WC	(India) A Raina	1	1
2	(Chinese Taipei) K-c Chang	6	6

Semifinals
5/WC	(Japan) J Namigata	6	1	1
3	(Thailand) L Kumkhum	4	6	6
Q	(China) X You	4	1
2	(Chinese Taipei) K-c Chang	6	6

Final
3	(Thailand) L Kumkhum	6	6
2	(Chinese Taipei) K-c Chang	4	3

=== Men's doubles ===
==== Seeds ====
1. (China) Zhe Li / (Chinese Taipei) Yi Chu-huan (semifinals)
2. (Chinese Taipei) Peng Hsien-yin / (China) Di Wu (quarterfinals)

3. (Chinese Taipei) Hsieh Cheng-peng / (Chinese Taipei) Yang Tsung-hua (winners)
4. (India) Jeevan Nedunchezhiyan / (India) Vijay Sundar Prashanth (final)

==== Draw ====
First round
(Philippines) FC Alcantara (Philippines) R Gonzales	6	6
WC	(China) Wu Hao (China) Yu Bingyu	1	3

Quarterfinals
1	(China) Zhe Li (Chinese Taipei) C-h Yi	6	6
(Philippines) FC Alcantara (Philippines) R Gonzales	3	4
3	(Chinese Taipei) C-p Hsieh (Chinese Taipei) T-h Yang	6	6
(China) X Gong (China) Zha Li	2	1
(China) X Gao (China) F Sun
4	(India) J Nedunchezhiyan (India) VS Prashanth	w/o
(China) P Gong (China) X Qi	2	6	[10]
2	(Chinese Taipei) H-y Peng (China) D Wu	6	4	[8]

Semifinals
1	(China) Zhe Li (Chinese Taipei) C-h Yi	1	6^{2}
3	(Chinese Taipei) C-p Hsieh (Chinese Taipei) T-h Yang	6	7^{7}
4	(India) J Nedunchezhiyan (India) VS Prashanth	6	6
(China) P Gong (China) X Qi	1	2

Final
3	(Chinese Taipei) C-p Hsieh (Chinese Taipei) T-h Yang	6	6
4	(India) J Nedunchezhiyan (India) VS Prashanth	1	4

=== Women's doubles ===
==== Seeds ====
1. (Thailand) Peangtarn Plipuech / (Thailand) Varatchaya Wongteanchai (semifinals)
2. (China) Lu Jingjing / (China) You Xiaodi (semifinals)

3. (Chinese Taipei) Chang Kai-chen / (Chinese Taipei) Hsu Ching-wen (final)
4. (India) Ankita Raina / (Uzbekistan) Sabina Sharipova (quarterfinals)

==== Draw ====
First round
WC	(China) Chen Siyu (China) Yang Yidi	2	0
WC	(Chinese Taipei) S-y Hsieh (Chinese Taipei) S-w Hsieh	6	6
(China) J Kang (China) Yih Li	w/o
WC	(China) Chen Yu (Fiji) Mulan Kamoe
(Chinese Taipei) C-w Chan (Japan) J Namigata	6	6
(China) H Guo (China) X Jiang	3	0
(Thailand) L Kumkhum (China) F Xun	7	6
WC	(China) Yix Li (China) X Sun	5	3

Quarterfinals
1	(Thailand) P Plipuech (Thailand) V Wongteanchai	1	6	[10]
WC	(Chinese Taipei) S-y Hsieh (Chinese Taipei) S-w Hsieh	6	3	[4]
3	(Chinese Taipei) K-c Chang (Chinese Taipei) C-w Hsu	7	6
(China) J Kang (China) Yih Li	5	2
(Chinese Taipei) C-w Chan (Japan) J Namigata	3	6	[10]
4	(India) A Raina (Uzbekistan) S Sharipova	6	2	[8]
(Thailand) L Kumkhum (China) F Xun	5	1
2	(China) J Lu (China) X You	7	6

Semifinals
1	(Thailand) P Plipuech (Thailand) V Wongteanchai	3	2
3	(Chinese Taipei) K-c Chang (Chinese Taipei) C-w Hsu	6	6
(Chinese Taipei) C-w Chan (Japan) J Namigata	7^{8}	6
2	(China) J Lu (China) X You	6^{6}	2

Final
3	(Chinese Taipei) K-c Chang (Chinese Taipei) C-w Hsu	6	3	[8]
(Chinese Taipei) C-w Chan (Japan) J Namigata	1	6	[10]

== Australian Wildcard Playoff ==
The December Showdown is held annually for two weeks in December. The Showdown includes age championships for 12/u, 14/u, 16/u and 18/u age categories. It also hosts the 2017 Australian Wildcard Playoff which will be held from 12–18 December 2016 at Melbourne Park. For the first time, a women's doubles playoff will be contested, with the winner receiving a main draw wildcard into the 2017 Australian Open women's doubles. For the second time in a row, the winner of the girls' 18/u championship will be given a main draw wildcard into the 2017 Australian Open.

=== Men's singles ===
==== Seeds ====
1. (Australia) Andrew Whittington (quarterfinals)
2. (Australia) Sam Groth (quarterfinals)
3. (Australia) Marinko Matosevic (first round)
4. (Australia) Marc Polmans (quarterfinals)
5. (Australia) John-Patrick Smith (final)
6. (Australia) Christopher O'Connell (semifinals)
7. (Australia) Luke Saville (first round; retired)
8. (Australia) Blake Mott (semifinals)

==== Draw ====
First round
1	(Australia) A Whittington	6	6	4	3	6
(Australia) M Purcell	3	3	6	6	2
(Australia) M Banes	6	4	4	1
5	(Australia) J-P Smith	3	6	6	6
4	(Australia) M Polmans	6	6	6
(Australia) Scott Jones	2	4	0
(Australia) H Bourchier	6	6^{5}	1	1
8	(Australia) B Mott	3	7^{7}	6	6
7	(Australia) L Saville	4	7^{9}	1	1^{r}
(Australia) Gavin van Peperzeel	6	6^{7}	6	2
(Australia) O Jasika	4	4	6	6	6
3	(Australia) M Matosevic	6	6	4	3	4
6	(Australia) C O'Connell	6	7^{7}	6
(Australia) A De Minaur	2	6^{3}	2
(Australia) D Kelly	3	7^{7}	7^{7}	4	8
2	(Australia) S Groth	6	6^{5}	6^{3}	6	10

Quarterfinals
1	(Australia) A Whittington	5	4	6^{9}
5	(Australia) J-P Smith	7	6	7^{11}
4	(Australia) M Polmans	2	2	3
8	(Australia) B Mott	6	6	6
(Australia) G van Peperzeel	4	0	2
(Australia) O Jasika	6	6	6
6	(Australia) C O'Connell	7	3	7	4	8
2	(Australia) S Groth	5	6	5	6	6

Semifinals
5	(Australia) J-P Smith	7^{7}	7	6^{4}	6
8	(Australia) B Mott	6^{2}	5	7^{7}	0
(Australia) O Jasika	6	6	6
6	(Australia) C O'Connell	1	1	2

Final
5	(Australia) J-P Smith	7^{7}	2	0	4
(Australia) O Jasika	6^{2}	6	6	6

=== Women's singles ===
==== Seeds ====
1. (Australia) Arina Rodionova (quarterfinals)
2. (Australia) Alison Bai (semifinals)
3. (Australia) Jaimee Fourlis (winner)
4. (Australia) Naiktha Bains (quarterfinals)
5. (Australia) Tammi Patterson (first round)
6. (Australia) Olivia Tjandramulia (semifinals)
7. (Australia) Sara Tomic (quarterfinals)
8. (Australia) Priscilla Hon (first round)

==== Draw ====
First round
1	(Australia) Ar Rodionova	6	6
(Australia) B Woolcock	1	0
(Australia) E Perez	2	1
6	(Australia) O Tjandramulia	6	6
3	(Australia) J Fourlis	6	6
(Australia) V Rajicic	3	4
(Australia) K McPhee	6	6
8	(Australia) P Hon	4	4
5	(Australia) T Patterson	1	7^{9}	6
(Australia) A Myers	6	6^{7}	8
(Australia) M Haet	1	3
4	(Australia) N Bains	6	6
7	(Australia) S Tomic	4
(Australia) M Inglis	0^{r}
(Australia) Angelique Svinos	3	4
2	(Australia) A Bai	6	6

Quarterfinals
1	(Australia) Ar Rodionova	3	6	5
6	(Australia) O Tjandramulia	6	1	7
3	(Australia) J Fourlis	4	6	6
(Australia) K McPhee	6	3	1
(Australia) A Myers	6	6
4	(Australia) N Bains	4	3
7	(Australia) S Tomic	4	7^{8}	3
2	(Australia) A Bai	6	6^{6}	6

Semifinals
6	(Australia) O Tjandramulia	5	2
3	(Australia) J Fourlis	7	6
(Australia) A Myers	6	4	6
2	(Australia) A Bai	3	6	4

Final
3	(Australia) J Fourlis	7^{8}	7
(Australia) A Myers	6^{6}	5

=== Women's doubles ===
==== Seeds ====
1. (Australia) Naiktha Bains / (Australia) Abbie Myers (final)
2. (Australia) Ellen Perez / (Australia) Olivia Tjandramulia (semifinals)
3. (Australia) Tammi Patterson / (Australia) Sally Peers (semifinals; retired)
4. (Australia) Destanee Aiava / (Australia) Alicia Smith (winners)

==== Draw ====
First round
1	(Australia) Naiktha Bains (Australia) Abbie Myers	6	6
WC	(Australia) Jaimee Fourlis (Australia) Jeanette Lin	1	3
3	(Australia) Tammi Patterson (Australia) Sally Peers	6	6
(Australia) Maddison Inglis (Australia) Belinda Woolcock	3	4
WC	(Australia) Kaylah McPhee (Australia) Kaitlin Staines	6^{4}	1
4	(Australia) Destanee Aiava (Australia) Alicia Smith	7^{7}	6
(Australia) Masa Jovanovic (Australia) Angelique Svinos	3	0
2	(Australia) Ellen Perez (Australia) Olivia Tjandramulia	6	6

Semifinals
1	(Australia) Naiktha Bains (Australia) Abbie Myers	6	0
3	(Australia) Tammi Patterson (Australia) Sally Peers	2	0^{r}
4	(Australia) Destanee Aiava (Australia) Alicia Smith	6	3	[10]
2	(Australia) Ellen Perez (Australia) Olivia Tjandramulia	4	6	[7]

Final
1	(Australia) Naiktha Bains (Australia) Abbie Myers	5	3
4	(Australia) Destanee Aiava (Australia) Alicia Smith	7	6

=== Boys' singles ===
==== Seeds ====
1. (Australia) Alexei Popyrin (round robin)
2. (Australia) Stefan Skadarka (round robin)
3. (Australia) Mislav Bosnjak (quarterfinals)
4. (Australia) Kody Pearson (final)
5. (Australia) Adam Walton (semifinals)
6. (Australia) Matthew Dellavedova (quarterfinals)
7. (Australia) Alexander Crnokrak (round robin)
8. (Australia) Benard Nkomba (quarterfinals)

==== Draw ====
Quarterfinals
(Australia) Lucas Vuradin	6	1	6
WC	(Australia) Chase Ferguson	2	6	2
4	(Australia) Kody Pearson	6	6
3	(Australia) Mislav Bosnjak	4	4
5	(Australia) Adam Walton	7^{7}	6
6	(Australia) Matthew Dellavedova	6^{1}	2
8	(Australia) Benard Nkomba	6	3	3
WC	(Australia) Scott Jones	1	6	6

Semifinals
(Australia) Lucas Vuradin	1	4
4	(Australia) Kody Pearson	6	6
5	(Australia) Adam Walton	4	2
WC	(Australia) Scott Jones	6	6

Final
4	(Australia) Kody Pearson	2	6	4
WC	(Australia) Scott Jones	6	4	6

=== Girls' singles ===
==== Seeds ====
1. (Australia) Destanee Aiava (winner)
2. (Australia) Jaimee Fourlis (final)
3. (Australia) Sara Tomic (quarterfinals)
4. (Australia) Priscilla Hon (quarterfinals)
5. (Australia) Maddison Inglis (semifinals)
6. (Australia) Kaylah McPhee (semifinals)
7. (Australia) Michaela Haet (quarterfinals)
8. (Australia) Gabriella Da Silva-Fick (round robin)

==== Draw ====
Quarterfinals
1	(Australia) Destanee Aiava	7	6
(Australia) Alexandra Bozovic	5	1
6	(Australia) Kaylah McPhee	6	7
4	(Australia) Priscilla Hon	4	5
3	(Australia) Sara Tomic	6^{4}	1
5	(Australia) Maddison Inglis	7^{7}	6
7	(Australia) Michaela Haet	2	2
2	(Australia) Jaimee Fourlis	6	6

Semifinals
1	(Australia) Destanee Aiava	6	6
6	(Australia) Kaylah McPhee	0	3
5	(Australia) Maddison Inglis	1	3
2	(Australia) Jaimee Fourlis	6	6

Final
1	(Australia) Destanee Aiava	7	6
2	(Australia) Jaimee Fourlis	5	3
