= 2017 JSM Challenger of Champaign–Urbana – Singles =

Urbana – Singles
- 2017 JSM Challenger of Champaign–Urbana

Final
- Champion: (United States) Tim Smyczek
- Runner-up: (United States) Bjorn Fratangelo
- Score: 6–2, 6–4

Events
Singles	Doubles
← 2016 ·	JSM Challenger of Champaign–Urbana	· 2018 →

Henri Laaksonen was the defending champion but lost in the second round to Filip Peliwo.

Tim Smyczek won the title after defeating Bjorn Fratangelo 6–2, 6–4 in the final.

== Seeds ==
1. (United States) Tennys Sandgren (quarterfinals)
2. (Switzerland) Henri Laaksonen (second round)
3. (United States) Taylor Fritz (semifinals)
4. (United Kingdom) Cameron Norrie (semifinals)
5. (United States) Bjorn Fratangelo (final)
6. (United States) Michael Mmoh (first round)
7. (United States) Tim Smyczek (champion)
8. (United States) Tommy Paul (quarterfinals, retired)

== Draw ==
=== Key ===
- Q = Qualifier
- WC = Wild card
- LL = Lucky loser
- Alt = Alternate
- SE = Special exempt
- PR = Protected ranking
- ITF = ITF entry
- JE = Junior exempt
- w/o = Walkover
- r = Retired
- d = Defaulted
- SR = Special ranking

=== Finals ===
Semifinals
7	(United States) Tim Smyczek	7	6^{5}	6
4	(United Kingdom) Cameron Norrie	5	7^{7}	3
3	(United States) Taylor Fritz	6	3	2
5	(United States) Bjorn Fratangelo	3	6	6

Final
7	(United States) Tim Smyczek	6	6
5	(United States) Bjorn Fratangelo	2	4

=== Top half ===
First round
1	(United States) T Sandgren	6	6^{1}	6
WC	(United States) Aron Hiltzik	1	7^{7}	0
(United Kingdom) E Corrie	6	4	4
(United States) C Harrison	3	6	6
WC	(United States) Dennis Nevolo	4	6	6
Q	(Canada) Samuel Monnette	6	4	0
Q	(United Kingdom) A Ward	4	6^{4}
7	(United States) T Smyczek	6	7^{7}
4	(United Kingdom) C Norrie	6	6
WC	(Australia) A Vukic	2	3
WC	(United States) Jared Hiltzik	3	6	7^{7}
(United States) M Krueger	6	4	6^{2}
(Australia) J-P Smith	6	6
(United States) M Giron	3	1
(United States) M McDonald	6	6
6	(United States) M Mmoh	2	1

Second round
1	(United States) T Sandgren	w/o
(United States) C Harrison
WC	(United States) D Nevolo	3	6^{4}
7	(United States) T Smyczek	6	7^{7}
4	(United Kingdom) C Norrie	6	6
WC	(United States) J Hiltzik	2	4
(Australia) J-P Smith	5	6^{5}
(United States) M McDonald	7	7^{7}

Quarterfinals
1	(United States) T Sandgren	4	4
7	(United States) T Smyczek	6	6
4	(United Kingdom) C Norrie	6	6
(United States) M McDonald	2	0

Semifinals
7	(United States) T Smyczek	7	6^{5}	6
4	(United Kingdom) C Norrie	5	7^{7}	3

=== Bottom half ===
First round
8	(United States) T Paul	6	6
(Germany) D Köpfer	2	4
(United States) N Rubin	4	2
Q	(Sweden) M Ymer	6	6
(Brazil) B Sant'Anna	6	3	1
Q	(United States) R Schneider	4	6	6
(United States) A Sarkissian	2	1
3	(United States) T Fritz	6	6
5	(United States) B Fratangelo	3	7^{7}	6
(Germany) S Fanselow	6	6^{0}	1
(United States) B Klahn	6	6
(South Africa) N Scholtz	2	3
(Canada) F Peliwo	7	3	6
(United States) C Eubanks	5	6	3
(Germany) M Moraing	4	4
2	(Switzerland) H Laaksonen	6	6

Second round
8	(United States) T Paul	6	3	7^{7}
Q	(Sweden) M Ymer	4	6	6^{0}
Q	(United States) R Schneider	4	3
3	(United States) T Fritz	6	6
5	(United States) B Fratangelo	6	6
(United States) B Klahn	4	4
(Canada) F Peliwo	6	7
2	(Switzerland) H Laaksonen	3	5

Quarterfinals
8	(United States) T Paul	1	0^{r}
3	(United States) T Fritz	6	3
5	(United States) B Fratangelo	4	7	7^{7}
(Canada) F Peliwo	6	5	6^{4}

Semifinals
3	(United States) T Fritz	6	3	2
5	(United States) B Fratangelo	3	6	6
