= 2016 JSM Challenger of Champaign–Urbana – Singles =

Urbana – Singles
- 2016 JSM Challenger of Champaign–Urbana

Final
- Champion: (Switzerland) Henri Laaksonen
- Runner-up: (Belgium) Ruben Bemelmans
- Score: 7–5, 6–3

Events
Singles	Doubles
- JSM Challenger of Champaign–Urbana

Henri Laaksonen was the defending champion and successfully defended his title by defeating Ruben Bemelmans 7–5, 6–3 in the final.

== Seeds ==
1. (United States) Jared Donaldson (semifinals)
2. (Switzerland) Henri Laaksonen (champion)
3. (United States) Stefan Kozlov (second round)
4. (Belgium) Joris De Loore (first round)
5. (Australia) Sam Groth (first round, retired)
6. (Belgium) Ruben Bemelmans (final)
7. (United States) Noah Rubin (first round)
8. (United States) Reilly Opelka (second round)

== Draw ==
Key

- Q = Qualifier
- WC = Wild card
- LL = Lucky loser
- Alt = Alternate
- ITF = ITF entry
- PR = Protected ranking
- SR = Special ranking
- SE = Special exempt
- JE = Junior exempt
- JR = Junior Accelerator Programme entrant
- CO = College Accelerator Programme entrant
- NG = Next Gen Accelerator Program entrant
- w/o = Walkover
- r = Retired
- d = Defaulted

=== Finals ===
Semifinals
1	(United States) Jared Donaldson	6^{1}	3
6	(Belgium) Ruben Bemelmans	7^{7}	6
WC	(United States) Christopher Eubanks	6^{3}	7^{8}	4
2	(Switzerland) Henri Laaksonen	7^{7}	6^{6}	6

Final
6	(Belgium) Ruben Bemelmans	5	3
2	(Switzerland) Henri Laaksonen	7	6

=== Top half ===
First round
1	(United States) J Donaldson	6	6
Q	(United Kingdom) D Cox	4	3
WC	(France) Noe Khlif	2	4
Q	(United States) R Shane	6	6
(United States) T Sandgren	6	6
WC	(United States) Aron Hiltzik	1	2
Q	(United States) B Klahn	7^{7}	0
5	(Australia) S Groth	6^{5}	0^{r}
4	(Belgium) J De Loore	3	4
(United Kingdom) L Broady	6	6
(United States) E Quigley	7^{7}	2	6^{4}
(United States) B Baker	6^{5}	6	7^{7}
(Denmark) M Torpegaard	4	6^{5}
(United States) M Krueger	6	7^{7}
(United Kingdom) C Norrie	4	3
6	(Belgium) R Bemelmans	6	6

Second round
1	(United States) J Donaldson	6	6
Q	(United States) R Shane	2	4
(United States) T Sandgren	6	3	4
Q	(United States) B Klahn	4	6	6
(United Kingdom) L Broady	4	1
(United States) B Baker	6	6
(United States) M Krueger	6^{5}	2
6	(Belgium) R Bemelmans	7^{7}	6

Quarterfinals
1	(United States) J Donaldson	6	6
Q	(United States) B Klahn	4	4
(United States) B Baker	3	0^{r}
6	(Belgium) R Bemelmans	6	1

Semifinals
1	(United States) J Donaldson	6^{1}	3
6	(Belgium) R Bemelmans	7^{7}	6

=== Bottom half ===
First round
7	(United States) N Rubin	6^{5}	3
WC	(United States) C Eubanks	7^{7}	6
(United States) S Bangoura	3	6	7^{7}
(Netherlands) T van Rijthoven	6	4	6^{5}
(Latvia) M Lībietis	1	4
(United States) M Mmoh	6	6
(United States) A Krajicek	4	6^{3}
3	(United States) S Kozlov	6	7^{7}
8	(United States) R Opelka	6^{3}	6	6
(United Kingdom) E Corrie	7^{7}	3	4
(Republic of Ireland) S Barry	3	4
Q	(United States) M Giron	6	6
(India) Y Bhambri	3	1
WC	(United States) Jared Hiltzik	6	6
Alt	(United States) R Sarmiento	7^{7}	3	4
2	(Switzerland) H Laaksonen	6^{1}	6	6

Second round
WC	(United States) C Eubanks	6	3	6
(United States) S Bangoura	1	6	1
(United States) M Mmoh	6	6
3	(United States) S Kozlov	1	4
8	(United States) R Opelka	2	6^{4}
Q	(United States) M Giron	6	7^{7}
WC	(United States) J Hiltzik	6	1	5
2	(Switzerland) H Laaksonen	1	6	7

Quarterfinals
WC	(United States) C Eubanks	w/o
(United States) M Mmoh
Q	(United States) M Giron	4	2
2	(Switzerland) H Laaksonen	6	6

Semifinals
WC	(United States) C Eubanks	6^{3}	7^{8}	4
2	(Switzerland) H Laaksonen	7^{7}	6^{6}	6
