= 2015 Charlottesville Men's Pro Challenger – Doubles =

Doubles
- 2015 Charlottesville Men's Pro Challenger

Final
- Champion: (United States) Chase Buchanan (United States) Tennys Sandgren
- Runner-up: (Canada) Peter Polansky (Canada) Adil Shamasdin
- Score: 3–6, 6–4, [10–5]

Events
Singles	Doubles
- Charlottesville Men's Pro Challenger

Chase Buchanan and Tennys Sandgren won the title, beating Peter Polansky and Adil Shamasdin 3–6, 6–4, [10–5]

== Seeds ==
1. (Sweden) Johan Brunström / (Denmark) Frederik Nielsen (semifinals)
2. (United States) Chase Buchanan / (United States) Tennys Sandgren (champions)
3. (Canada) Peter Polansky / (Canada) Adil Shamasdin (final)
4. (Republic of Ireland) David O'Hare / (United Kingdom) Joe Salisbury (semifinals)

== Draw ==
Key

- Q = Qualifier
- WC = Wild card
- LL = Lucky loser
- Alt = Alternate
- ITF = ITF entry
- PR = Protected ranking
- SR = Special ranking
- SE = Special exempt
- JE = Junior exempt
- JR = Junior Accelerator Programme entrant
- CO = College Accelerator Programme entrant
- NG = Next Gen Accelerator Program entrant
- w/o = Walkover
- r = Retired
- d = Defaulted

=== Main draw ===
First round
1	(Sweden) J Brunström (Denmark) F Nielsen	6	6
(United Kingdom) D Rice (United Kingdom) M Willis	4	1
(Switzerland) A Bossel (United States) M Krueger	6	3	[10]
(Australia) Jarryd Chaplin (Australia) J Duckworth	2	6	[7]
3	(Canada) P Polansky (Canada) A Shamasdin	6	7^{7}
WC	(United States) T-S Kwiatkowski (United States) M Styslinger	4	6^{4}
(United States) B Fratangelo (United Kingdom) J Milton	6	7^{7}
WC	(United States) Luca Corinteli (United States) R Shane	4	6^{5}
(United States) S Bangoura (Czech Republic) M Michalička	3	6^{5}
(United Kingdom) D Smethurst (United Kingdom) D Walsh	6	7^{7}
WC	(United States) S Kozlov (United States) F Tiafoe	3	4
4	(Republic of Ireland) D O'Hare (United Kingdom) J Salisbury	6	6
(Switzerland) H Laaksonen (Switzerland) L Margaroli	6	6
Q	(United States) R Opelka (United States) T Paul	2	2
(United Kingdom) L Broady (United Kingdom) D Evans	4	4
2	(United States) C Buchanan (United States) T Sandgren	6	6

Quarter-finals
1	(Sweden) J Brunström (Denmark) F Nielsen	7^{7}	7
(Switzerland) A Bossel (United States) M Krueger	6^{3}	5
3	(Canada) P Polansky (Canada) A Shamasdin	6	6
(United States) B Fratangelo (United Kingdom) J Milton	1	1
(United Kingdom) D Smethurst (United Kingdom) D Walsh	4	4
4	(Republic of Ireland) D O'Hare (United Kingdom) J Salisbury	6	6
(Switzerland) H Laaksonen (Switzerland) L Margaroli	4	6^{5}
2	(United States) C Buchanan (United States) T Sandgren	6	7^{7}

Semi-finals
1	(Sweden) J Brunström (Denmark) F Nielsen	2	6	[11]
3	(Canada) P Polansky (Canada) A Shamasdin	6	3	[13]
4	(Republic of Ireland) D O'Hare (United Kingdom) J Salisbury	1	3
2	(United States) C Buchanan (United States) T Sandgren	6	6

Final
3	(Canada) P Polansky (Canada) A Shamasdin	6	4	[5]
2	(United States) C Buchanan (United States) T Sandgren	3	6	[10]
