= 2018 JSM Challenger of Champaign–Urbana – Doubles =

Urbana – Doubles
- 2018 JSM Challenger of Champaign–Urbana

Final
- Champions: (Australia) Matt Reid (Australia) John-Patrick Smith
- Runners-up: (Mexico) Hans Hach Verdugo (Venezuela) Luis David Martínez
- Score: 6–4, 4–6, [10–8]

Events
Singles	Doubles
← 2017 ·	JSM Challenger of Champaign–Urbana	· 2019 →

Leander Paes and Purav Raja were the defending champions but chose not to defend their title.

Matt Reid and John-Patrick Smith won the title after defeating Hans Hach Verdugo and Luis David Martínez 6–4, 4–6, [10–8] in the final.

== Seeds ==
1. (Spain) Marcel Granollers / (Netherlands) Mark Vervoort (first round)
2. (Australia) Matt Reid / (Australia) John-Patrick Smith (champions)
3. (Japan) Toshihide Matsui / (Denmark) Frederik Nielsen (first round)
4. (Canada) Peter Polansky / (Canada) Adil Shamasdin (semifinals)

== Draw ==
=== Key ===
- Q = Qualifier
- WC = Wild card
- LL = Lucky loser
- Alt = Alternate
- SE = Special exempt
- PR = Protected ranking
- ITF = ITF entry
- JE = Junior exempt
- w/o = Walkover
- r = Retired
- d = Defaulted
- SR = Special ranking

First round
1	(Spain) M Granollers (Netherlands) M Vervoort	6	5	[6]
(Serbia) N Čačić (Serbia) N Milojević	4	7	[10]
(United States) A Lawson (United States) H Reese	6^{8}	4
(Kazakhstan) T Khabibulin (Kazakhstan) D Yevseyev	7^{10}	6
3	(Japan) T Matsui (Denmark) F Nielsen	1	4
(United States) A Ritschard (United States) R Shane	6	6
(Mexico) H Hach Verdugo (Venezuela) LD Martínez	w/o
(Finland) H Heliövaara (Switzerland) H Laaksonen
WC	(United States) Alexander Brown (United States) C Chakravarthi	3	2
(United States) JC Aragone (United States) K King	6	6
WC	(United States) S Korda (United States) D Thomas	6^{3}	0
4	(Canada) P Polansky (Canada) A Shamasdin	7^{7}	6
(United States) H Johnson (United States) Y Johnson	7^{7}	3	[6]
WC	(United States) Jared Hiltzik (United States) A Kovacevic	6^{5}	6	[10]
(South Africa) R Roelofse (Netherlands) S Verbeek	3	5
2	(Australia) M Reid (Australia) J-P Smith	6	7

Quarterfinals
(Serbia) N Čačić (Serbia) N Milojević	6	7
(Kazakhstan) T Khabibulin (Kazakhstan) D Yevseyev	4	5
(United States) A Ritschard (United States) R Shane	4	6^{2}
(Mexico) H Hach Verdugo (Venezuela) LD Martínez	6	7^{7}
(United States) JC Aragone (United States) K King	4	4
4	(Canada) P Polansky (Canada) A Shamasdin	6	6
WC	(United States) J Hiltzik (United States) A Kovacevic	3	1
2	(Australia) M Reid (Australia) J-P Smith	6	6

Semifinals
(Serbia) N Čačić (Serbia) N Milojević	6^{5}	4
(Mexico) H Hach Verdugo (Venezuela) LD Martínez	7^{7}	6
4	(Canada) P Polansky (Canada) A Shamasdin	4	2
2	(Australia) M Reid (Australia) J-P Smith	6	6

Final
(Mexico) H Hach Verdugo (Venezuela) LD Martínez	4	6	[8]
2	(Australia) M Reid (Australia) J-P Smith	6	4	[10]
