= 2017 JSM Challenger of Champaign–Urbana – Doubles =

Urbana – Doubles
- 2017 JSM Challenger of Champaign–Urbana

Final
- Champions: (India) Leander Paes (India) Purav Raja
- Runners-up: (South Africa) Ruan Roelofse (United Kingdom) Joe Salisbury
- Score: 6–3, 6–7^{(5–7)}, [10–5]

Events
Singles	Doubles
← 2016 ·	JSM Challenger of Champaign–Urbana	· 2018 →

Austin Krajicek and Tennys Sandgren were the defending champions but chose not to defend their title.

Leander Paes and Purav Raja won the title after defeating Ruan Roelofse and Joe Salisbury 6–3, 6–7^{(5–7)}, [10–5] in the final.

== Seeds ==
1. (India) Leander Paes / (India) Purav Raja (champions)
2. (United States) James Cerretani / (Australia) John-Patrick Smith (semifinals)
3. (South Africa) Ruan Roelofse / (United Kingdom) Joe Salisbury (final)
4. (United Kingdom) Luke Bambridge / (Republic of Ireland) David O'Hare (quarterfinals)

== Draw ==
Key

- Q = Qualifier
- WC = Wild card
- LL = Lucky loser
- Alt = Alternate
- ITF = ITF entry
- PR = Protected ranking
- SR = Special ranking
- SE = Special exempt
- JE = Junior exempt
- JR = Junior Accelerator Programme entrant
- CO = College Accelerator Programme entrant
- NG = Next Gen Accelerator Program entrant
- w/o = Walkover
- r = Retired
- d = Defaulted

First round
1	(India) L Paes (India) P Raja	6	6
LL	(United States) Alexander Brown (United States) Ezekiel Clark	4	1
(United States) N Lammons (United States) A Lawson	6	6
(United States) T Fritz (United States) M Krueger	2	3
4	(United Kingdom) L Bambridge (Republic of Ireland) D O'Hare	6	7^{7}
PR	(United States) JP Fruttero (South Africa) N Scholtz	4	6^{3}
Q	(Venezuela) R Maytín (United States) R Schneider	2	4
(United States) C Eubanks (United States) M McDonald	6	6
(Mexico) H Hach Verdugo (Venezuela) LD Martínez	6	6
WC	(United States) Aron Hiltzik (United States) Dennis Nevolo	3	3
WC	(United States) Jared Hiltzik (United States) A Kovacevic	2	4
3	(South Africa) R Roelofse (United Kingdom) J Salisbury	6	6
(United States) Hunter Callahan (Brazil) B Sant'Anna	3	6^{1}
WC	(United States) A Ayeni (United States) D Thomas	6	7^{7}
(Germany) M Moraing (Australia) A Vukic	0	1
2	(United States) J Cerretani (Australia) J-P Smith	6	6

Quarterfinals
1	(India) L Paes (India) P Raja	6	6
(United States) N Lammons (United States) A Lawson	3	1
4	(United Kingdom) L Bambridge (Republic of Ireland) D O'Hare	2	6^{9}
(United States) C Eubanks (United States) M McDonald	6	7^{11}
(Mexico) H Hach Verdugo (Venezuela) LD Martínez	4	6	[3]
3	(South Africa) R Roelofse (United Kingdom) J Salisbury	6	3	[10]
WC	(United States) A Ayeni (United States) D Thomas	6^{1}	1
2	(United States) J Cerretani (Australia) J-P Smith	7^{7}	6

Semifinals
1	(India) L Paes (India) P Raja	6	6
(United States) C Eubanks (United States) M McDonald	4	4
3	(South Africa) R Roelofse (United Kingdom) J Salisbury	6	6
2	(United States) J Cerretani (Australia) J-P Smith	4	4

Final
1	(India) L Paes (India) P Raja	6	6^{5}	[10]
3	(South Africa) R Roelofse (United Kingdom) J Salisbury	3	7^{7}	[5]
