= 2015 Charlottesville Men's Pro Challenger =

- Date: 2–8 November
- Edition: 7th
- Draw: 32S/16D/32QS/4QD
- Prize money: $50,000
- Surface: Indoor Hard
- Location: Charlottesville, United States

Champions

Singles
- (United States) Noah Rubin

Doubles
- (United States) Chase Buchanan / (United States) Tennys Sandgren
← 2014 ·	Charlottesville Men's Pro Challenger	· 2016 →

The 2015 Charlottesville Men's Pro Challenger was a professional tennis tournament played on indoor hard courts. It was the seventh edition of the tournament which was part of the 2015 ATP Challenger Tour, taking place in Charlottesville, United States from November 2 to November 8, 2015.

== Singles main-draw entrants ==
=== Seeds ===
Country	Player	Rank^{1}	Seed
TUN	Malek Jaziri	92	1
AUS	James Duckworth	99	2
USA	Tim Smyczek	101	3
USA	Ryan Harrison	107	4
USA	Bjorn Fratangelo	129	5
USA	Jared Donaldson	135	6
SLO	Blaž Kavčič	154	7
GBR	Liam Broady	224	8

- ^{1} Rankings are as of October 26, 2015.

=== Other entrants ===
The following players received wildcards into the singles main draw:

- (United States) Collin Altamirano
- (United States) Ernesto Escobedo
- (United States) Ryan Shane
- (United States) Mac Styslinger

The following player received entry as an alternate:

- (United States) Tommy Paul

The following players received entry from the qualifying draw:

- (Zimbabwe) Takanyi Garanganga
- (United States) Stefan Kozlov
- (United Kingdom) David Rice
- (United States) Noah Rubin

== Champions ==
=== Singles ===
- (United States) Noah Rubin def. (United States) Tommy Paul 3–6, 7–6^{(9–7)}, 6–3

=== Doubles ===
- (United States) Chase Buchanan / (United States) Tennys Sandgren def. (Canada) Peter Polansky / (Canada) Adil Shamasdin 3–6, 6–4, [10–5]
