= 2016 Charlottesville Men's Pro Challenger – Singles =

Singles
- 2016 Charlottesville Men's Pro Challenger

Final
- Champion: (United States) Reilly Opelka
- Runner-up: (Belgium) Ruben Bemelmans
- Score: 6–4, 2–6, 7–6^{(7–5)}

Events
Singles	Doubles
- Charlottesville Men's Pro Challenger

Noah Rubin was the defending champion but lost in the first round to Peter Polansky.

Reilly Opelka won the title after defeating Ruben Bemelmans 6–2, 4–6, 7–6^{(7–5)} in the final.

== Seeds ==
1. (United States) Frances Tiafoe (second round)
2. (United States) Jared Donaldson (quarterfinals)
3. (United States) Bjorn Fratangelo (second round)
4. (United States) Denis Kudla (quarterfinals)
5. (United States) Tim Smyczek (quarterfinals)
6. (Switzerland) Henri Laaksonen (semifinals)
7. (Canada) Peter Polansky (quarterfinals)
8. (United States) Dennis Novikov (first round)

== Draw ==
Key

- Q = Qualifier
- WC = Wild card
- LL = Lucky loser
- Alt = Alternate
- ITF = ITF entry
- PR = Protected ranking
- SR = Special ranking
- SE = Special exempt
- JE = Junior exempt
- JR = Junior Accelerator Programme entrant
- CO = College Accelerator Programme entrant
- NG = Next Gen Accelerator Program entrant
- w/o = Walkover
- r = Retired
- d = Defaulted

=== Finals ===
Semifinals
WC	(United States) Mackenzie McDonald	3	4
(United States) Reilly Opelka	6	6
(Belgium) Ruben Bemelmans	4	6	7^{7}
6	(Switzerland) Henri Laaksonen	6	4	6^{3}

Final
(United States) Reilly Opelka	6	2	7^{7}
(Belgium) Ruben Bemelmans	4	6	6^{5}

=== Top half ===
First round
1	(United States) F Tiafoe	6	2	6
WC	(United States) R Shane	3	6	4
WC	(United States) M McDonald	7^{7}	7^{7}
Q	(United States) Gonzales Austin	6^{0}	6^{2}
(United States) A Krajicek	7^{7}	6
(United Kingdom) E Corrie	6^{3}	4
(United States) N Rubin	3	2
7	(Canada) P Polansky	6	6
4	(United States) D Kudla	6	6
(United States) T Paul	1	2
WC	(Sweden) C Söderlund	7^{7}	4	6
(Australia) S Groth	6^{1}	6	2
(United States) S Bangoura	7	5	4
(United States) R Opelka	5	7	6
(United States) M Mmoh	6	6
8	(United States) D Novikov	3	2

Second round
1	(United States) F Tiafoe	0	3
WC	(United States) M McDonald	6	6
(United States) A Krajicek	2	4
7	(Canada) P Polansky	6	6
4	(United States) D Kudla	6	6
WC	(Sweden) C Söderlund	4	1
(United States) R Opelka	6	6^{5}	6
(United States) M Mmoh	4	7^{7}	3

Quarterfinals
WC	(United States) M McDonald	7	6
7	(Canada) P Polansky	5	4
4	(United States) D Kudla	3	6^{7}
(United States) R Opelka	6	7^{9}

Semifinals
WC	(United States) M McDonald	3	4
(United States) R Opelka	6	6

=== Bottom half ===
First round
5	(United States) T Smyczek	6	2	6
Q	(United States) T-S Kwiatkowski	4	6	3
(United States) B Baker	6	6
(Netherlands) T van Rijthoven	4	2
(Republic of Ireland) S Barry	1	2
(Belgium) R Bemelmans	6	6
(Belgium) J De Loore	6^{3}	2
3	(United States) B Fratangelo	7^{7}	6
6	(Switzerland) H Laaksonen	6	7^{7}
Q	(India) Y Bhambri	3	6^{3}
(United States) T Sandgren	6	6^{6}	6
(United Kingdom) B Klein	4	7^{8}	1
(United Kingdom) L Broady	6	3	6
Q	(United States) JC Aragone	1	6	3
WC	(Switzerland) A Ritschard	2	6	3
2	(United States) J Donaldson	6	3	6

Second round
5	(United States) T Smyczek	7	6
(United States) B Baker	5	4
(Belgium) R Bemelmans	6^{5}	6	6
3	(United States) B Fratangelo	7^{7}	4	2
6	(Switzerland) H Laaksonen	6	7^{8}
(United States) T Sandgren	1	6^{6}
(United Kingdom) L Broady	4	6^{3}
2	(United States) J Donaldson	6	7^{7}

Quarterfinals
5	(United States) T Smyczek	2	4
(Belgium) R Bemelmans	6	6
6	(Switzerland) H Laaksonen	6	7
2	(United States) J Donaldson	3	5

Semifinals
(Belgium) R Bemelmans	4	6	7^{7}
6	(Switzerland) H Laaksonen	6	4	6^{3}
