= 2015 Charlottesville Men's Pro Challenger – Singles =

Singles
- 2015 Charlottesville Men's Pro Challenger

Final
- Champion: (United States) Noah Rubin
- Runner-up: (United States) Tommy Paul
- Score: 3–6, 7–6^{(9–7)}, 6–3

Events
Singles	Doubles
- Charlottesville Men's Pro Challenger

Noah Rubin won the title, beating Tommy Paul 3–6, 7–6^{(9–7)}, 6–3

== Seeds ==
1. (Tunisia) Malek Jaziri (first round)
2. (Australia) James Duckworth (first round)
3. (United States) Tim Smyczek (quarterfinals)
4. (United States) Ryan Harrison (second round)
5. (United States) Bjorn Fratangelo (quarterfinals)
6. (United States) Jared Donaldson (second round)
7. (Slovenia) Blaž Kavčič (first round)
8. (United Kingdom) Liam Broady (first round)

== Draw ==
Key

- Q = Qualifier
- WC = Wild card
- LL = Lucky loser
- Alt = Alternate
- ITF = ITF entry
- PR = Protected ranking
- SR = Special ranking
- SE = Special exempt
- JE = Junior exempt
- JR = Junior Accelerator Programme entrant
- CO = College Accelerator Programme entrant
- NG = Next Gen Accelerator Program entrant
- w/o = Walkover
- r = Retired
- d = Defaulted

=== Finals ===
Semifinals
Alt	(United States) Tommy Paul	6	6
(Bulgaria) Dimitar Kutrovsky	3	4
(Switzerland) Henri Laaksonen	5	2
Q	(United States) Noah Rubin	7	6

Final
Alt	(United States) Tommy Paul	6	6^{7}	3
Q	(United States) Noah Rubin	3	7^{9}	6

=== Top half ===
First round
1	(Tunisia) M Jaziri	6^{5}	4
(United States) F Tiafoe	7^{7}	6
(United States) A Kuznetsov	5	7^{7}	6
Q	(Zimbabwe) T Garanganga	7	6^{4}	0
(United States) C Buchanan	2	4
Alt	(United States) T Paul	6	6
(Denmark) F Nielsen	6	5	6
7	(Slovenia) B Kavčič	3	7	4
3	(United States) T Smyczek	6	6
(United Kingdom) D Evans	4	4
WC	(United States) R Shane	3	2
(United States) S Bangoura	6	6
(Bulgaria) D Kutrovsky	6	4	6
(Switzerland) A Bossel	1	6	3
WC	(United States) E Escobedo	0	7^{7}	6
8	(United Kingdom) L Broady	6	6^{5}	3

Second round
(United States) F Tiafoe	6	3	0
(United States) A Kuznetsov	2	6	6
Alt	(United States) T Paul	6	6
(Denmark) F Nielsen	3	3
3	(United States) T Smyczek	6	7^{8}
(United States) S Bangoura	3	6^{6}
(Bulgaria) D Kutrovsky	7	6
WC	(United States) E Escobedo	5	4

Quarterfinals
(United States) A Kuznetsov	3	1
Alt	(United States) T Paul	6	6
3	(United States) T Smyczek	4	4
(Bulgaria) D Kutrovsky	6	6

Semifinals
Alt	(United States) T Paul	6	6
(Bulgaria) D Kutrovsky	3	4

=== Bottom half ===
First round
5	(United States) B Fratangelo	6	6
(United States) K King	4	3
WC	(United States) M Styslinger	6	1	0
(United States) M Krueger	4	6	6
(United Kingdom) J Milton	3	2
(Switzerland) H Laaksonen	6	6
(United States) T Sandgren	5	3
4	(United States) R Harrison	7	6
6	(United States) J Donaldson	7^{7}	6
(Czech Republic) M Michalička	6^{3}	4
Q	(United States) N Rubin	3	7^{7}	6
(United States) E Quigley	6	6^{4}	4
Q	(United States) S Kozlov	6	6
WC	(United States) C Altamirano	3	0
Q	(United Kingdom) D Rice	4	6	6
2	(Australia) J Duckworth	6	4	2

Second round
5	(United States) B Fratangelo	7^{7}	4	6
(United States) M Krueger	6^{4}	6	2
(Switzerland) H Laaksonen	7	7
4	(United States) R Harrison	5	5
6	(United States) J Donaldson	4	6	3
Q	(United States) N Rubin	6	1	6
Q	(United States) S Kozlov	2	6	6
Q	(United Kingdom) D Rice	6	4	2

Quarterfinals
5	(United States) B Fratangelo	3	6	3
(Switzerland) H Laaksonen	6	3	6
Q	(United States) N Rubin	6	6
Q	(United States) S Kozlov	4	4

Semifinals
(Switzerland) H Laaksonen	5	2
Q	(United States) N Rubin	7	6
