= Destanee Aiava =

New Zealand tennis player (born 2000)

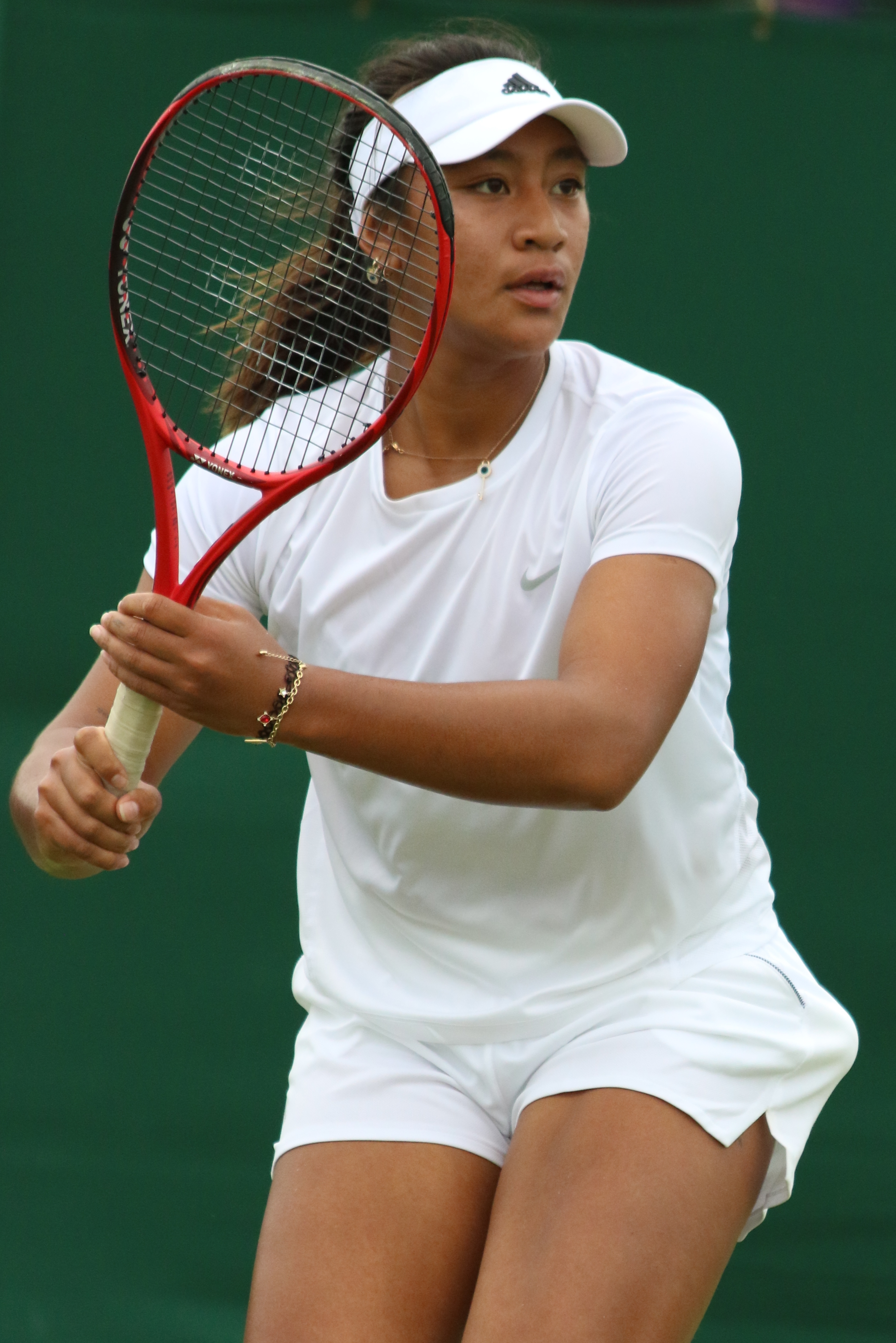
- Aiava at the 2019 Wimbledon Championships
- Full name: Destanee Gabriella Aiava
- Country (sports): Australia (2015–2026); New Zealand (June 2026-present)
- Residence: Narre Warren, Victoria, Australia
- Born: 10 May 2000 (age 26) Melbourne, Victoria, Australia
- Height: 1.75 m (5 ft 9 in)
- Turned pro: 2015
- Plays: Right (two-handed backhand)
- Coach: Corey Gaal
- Prize money: $1,367,024

Singles
- Career record: 279–182
- Career titles: 12 ITF
- Highest ranking: No. 147 (11 September 2017)
- Current ranking: No. 563 (31 August 2026)

Grand Slam singles results
- Australian Open: 2R (2025)
- French Open: 1R (2025)
- Wimbledon: Q3 (2017)
- US Open: 1R (2024, 2025)

Doubles
- Career record: 157–97
- Career titles: 1 WTA Challenger
- Highest ranking: No. 133 (5 August 2024)
- Current ranking: No. 724 (31 August 2026)

Grand Slam doubles results
- Australian Open: 2R (2024)

Grand Slam mixed doubles results
- Australian Open: 1R (2017, 2025)
- Last updated on: 7 September 2026.

Destanee Gabriella Aiava (born 10 May 2000) is an Australian-born, New Zealand professional tennis player. She has career-high WTA rankings of world No. 147 in singles, achieved on 11 September 2017, and No. 133 in doubles, set on 5 August 2024.

Aiava has won 12 singles and 14 doubles titles on the ITF Women's Circuit. She made her major main-draw debut after winning the 2016 U18 Australian Championships, which granted her a wildcard into the 2017 Australian Open. She thus became the first player, male or female, born in 2000 or later to participate in the main draw of a Grand Slam tournament.

== Early life ==
Aiava was born in Melbourne to a New Zealand father of Samoan descent and a mother from American Samoa. Her mother, Rosie, was a professional kickboxer and rugby player who represented the Australian national rugby team and her father, Mark, was a professional powerlifter. In 2005, at four years of age, Aiava watched Serena Williams win the Australian Open final and was inspired to begin playing tennis.

== Juniors ==
=== 2012–2016 ===
In 2012, at the age of 12, Aiava represented Australia at Roland Garros in the Longines Future Tennis Aces Tournament. Competing against fifteen of the top under-13 female tennis players, Aiava won the tournament and the right to play alongside Steffi Graf in an exhibition match. The years following, Aiava played mainly on the junior circuit. In 2014, she won the Tecnifibre Tennis Central Championships and NZ ITF Summer Championships in New Zealand as well as Australian Internationals in Queensland and Victoria. At the age of 14, she won the U18 Canadian world ranking event in Montreal, Quebec.

== Professional ==
=== 2015–2016 ===
In early 2015, Aiava made her professional debut at the Burnie International, after receiving wildcards into the singles and doubles draws, where she lost early in both. At the Launceston Tennis International, Aiava won her first pro main-draw match against Lu Jiajing. She also made the quarterfinals of a $15k tournament in Melbourne in April 2015. In March 2016, Aiava reached her first career final at a $25k tournament in Canberra which she lost, in three sets. In December 2016, she won the U18 Girls' Australian Championships and earned a wildcard into the 2017 Australian Open. She thus became the first player born in the year 2000 to play at a Grand Slam championship.

=== 2017: First titles and major debut ===
Aiava commenced the year by qualifying for the Brisbane International and her first appearance in a WTA Tour main draw. Aiava defeated Bethanie Mattek-Sands in the first round, before losing to two-time major champion and world No. 9, Svetlana Kuznetsova. Aiava made her major debut at the Australian Open as a wildcard, losing in round one to Mona Barthel.

In February, Aiava won the first ITF Circuit title of her career, winning the $25k event in Perth by defeating Viktória Kužmová in the final. The following month, she won another $25k title, this time in Mornington, beating Barbora Krejčíková in the final. In April, Aiava was named to the Australia Fed Cup team for the first time. In May, she reached the semifinals of the Open Saint-Gaudens, before losing in the first round of qualifying at the French Open. In June, Aiava lost in the final round of Wimbledon qualifying. In September, she reached the second round of qualifying for the US Open before being granted a wildcard into Tournoi de Québec, where she lost in the first round. In October, Aiava reached the final of the Canberra International. In December, she was unable to defend her girls' title, losing to Jaimee Fourlis in a reversal of the result from 2016. The following week, Aiava won the Australian Open Wildcard Playoff.

=== 2018: Third ITF title ===
Aiava was awarded a wildcard into the Brisbane International where she lost in the first round to another wildcard entry, Ajla Tomljanović.

Aiava also was handed a wildcard for the Australian Open, where she was defeated in the first round by the world No. 1 and top seed, Simona Halep. Aiava had two set points in the first set, before going off-court to receive a medical timeout. She subsequently lost the match in straight sets. Aiava reached the quarterfinals of the Burnie International and Zhuhai Open, before reaching the final of the Clay Court International. In April, she won the title at the Osaka event, her third on the ITF Circuit and first title outside Australia.

In May she lost in the first round of French Open qualifying.

=== 2019–2022 ===
Aiava began the season at the Brisbane International, where she qualified for the main draw with victories over Vania King, Mandy Minella and Christina McHale. She then defeated Kristina Mladenovic in the first round, before falling to second seed Naomi Osaka. Aiava received her third Australian Open wildcard entry, losing to 17th seed Madison Keys. She then won the Clay Court International title on March 24 by defeating world No. 289, Risa Ozaki.

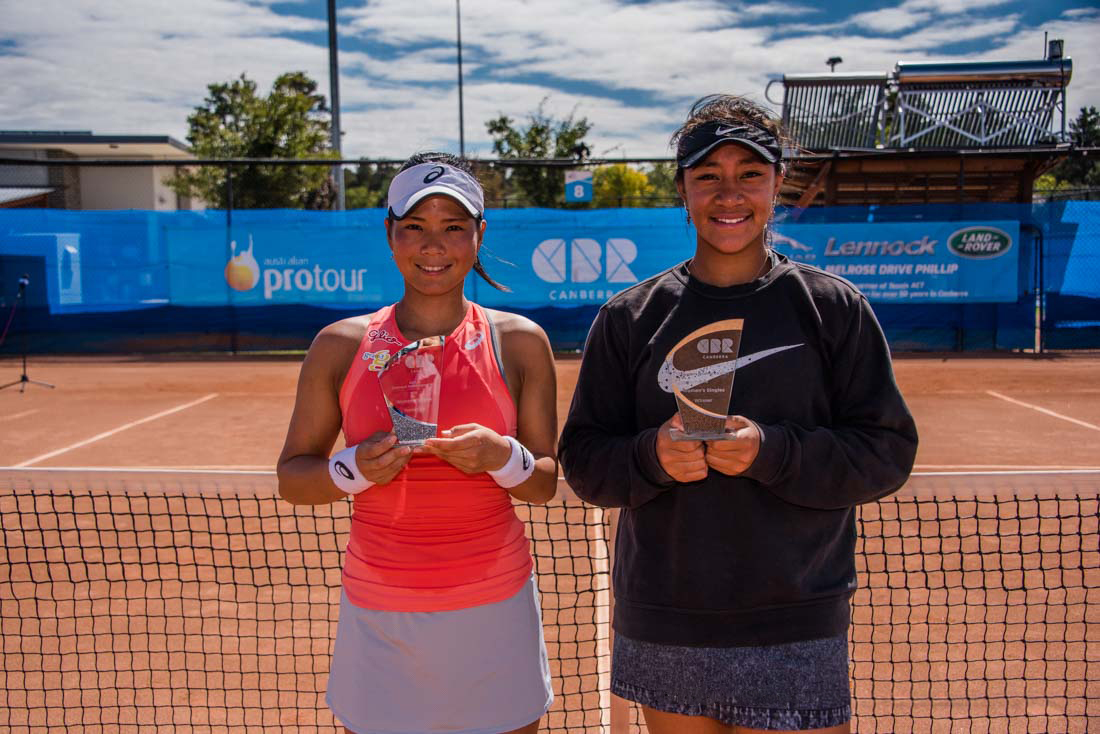
Canberra – 24 March 2019: Destanee Aiava (right) after winning the Clay Court International final against Risa Ozaki.

In January 2022, Aiava lost in the first round of Australian Open qualifying.

=== 2024: US Open debut ===
Ranked No. 180, she qualified for the main draw of the 2024 US Open, making her debut at this major with wins over Gergana Topalova, fourth seed Mai Hontama and Ana Konjuh. She lost in the first round to fourth seed Elena Rybakina.

=== 2025: First major match win ===
Aiava defeated Eva Lys in the final qualifying round at the Australian Open to make it into the main draw. She then claimed her first Grand Slam tournament win by defeating Greet Minnen in a match which went to a deciding set tiebreak. Aiava lost in the second round to 10th seed Danielle Collins in another three-set match.

She was given a wildcard into the main draw at the French Open, but lost to Dayana Yastremska in the first round. Aiava qualified for the US Open, but once again lost in the first round, this time to seventh seed Jasmine Paolini.

=== 2026: Retirement U-turn, Nationality change to New Zealand ===
In 2026, Aiava lost her first-round women's doubles match, and failed to qualify for the singles draw. She announced in February that she planned to retire at the end of the season, criticising the sport's sexism, racism, and homophobia.

In March, Aiava meant that she had reversed her decision to retire and would continue playing beyond 2026. She announced in June 2026 that she had changed her sporting nationality to New Zealand.

== Grand Slam performance timelines ==
Key
W	F	SF	QF	#R	RR	Q#	P#	DNQ	A	Z#	PO	G	S	B	NMS	NTI	P	NH

(W) winner; (F) finalist; (SF) semifinalist; (QF) quarterfinalist; (#R) rounds 4, 3, 2, 1; (RR) round-robin stage; (Q#) qualification round; (P#) preliminary round; (DNQ) did not qualify; (A) absent; (Z#) Davis/Fed Cup Zonal Group (with number indication) or (PO) play-off; (G) gold, (S) silver or (B) bronze Olympic/Paralympic medal; (NMS) not a Masters tournament; (NTI) not a Tier I tournament; (P) postponed; (NH) not held; (SR) strike rate (events won / competed); (W–L) win–loss record.
To avoid confusion and double counting, these charts are updated at the conclusion of a tournament or when the player's participation has ended.

=== Singles ===
Tournament	2016	2017	2018	2019	2020	2021	2022	2023	2024	2025	SR	W–L
Australian Open	Q1	1R	1R	1R	Q3	1R	Q1	Q2	Q3	2R	0 / 5	1–5
French Open	A	Q1	Q1	A	A	A	A	A	Q1	1R	0 / 1	0–1
Wimbledon	A	Q3	A	Q1	NH	Q1	A	A	Q2	Q2	0 / 0	0–0
US Open	A	Q2	Q1	Q1	A	A	A	A	1R	1R	0 / 2	0–2
Win–loss	0–0	0–1	0–1	0–1	0–0	0–1	0–0	0–0	0–1	1–3	0 / 8	1–8

=== Doubles ===
Tournament	2017	2018	2019	2020	2021	2022	2023	2024	SR	W–L
Australian Open	1R	A	1R	1R	1R	A	A	2R	0 / 5	1–5
French Open	A	A	A	A	A	A	A	A	0 / 0	0–0
Wimbledon	A	A	A	NH	A	A	A	A	0 / 0	0–0
US Open	A	A	A	A	A	A	A	A	0 / 0	0–0
Win–loss	0–1	0–0	0–1	0–1	0–1	0–0	0–0	1–1	0 / 5	1–5

== WTA 125 finals ==
=== Doubles: 1 (title) ===
Result	W–L	Date	Tournament	Surface	Partner	Opponents	Score
Win	1–0	Jun 2025	Birmingham Open, United Kingdom	Grass	(Spain) Cristina Bucșa	(United Kingdom) Alicia Barnett (France) Elixane Lechemia	6–4, 6–2

== ITF Circuit finals ==
=== Singles: 23 (12 titles, 11 runner-ups) ===
Legend W60 tournaments (0–3) W40/50 tournaments (1–0) W25/35 tournaments (9–6) W15 tournaments (2–2)	Finals by surface Hard (10–9) Clay (2–2)

Result	W–L	Date	Tournament	Tier	Surface	Opponent	Score
Loss	0–1	May 2016	Clay Court International, Australia	W25	Clay	(Japan) Eri Hozumi	3–6, 6–3, 6–7^{(3)}
Loss	0–2	Sep 2016	ITF Tweed Heads, Australia	W25	Hard	(Australia) Lizette Cabrera	3–6, 7–5, 2–6
Win	1–2	Feb 2017	Perth Tennis International, Australia	W25	Hard	(Slovakia) Viktória Kužmová	6–1, 6–1
Win	2–2	Mar 2017	ITF Mornington, Australia	W25	Clay	(Czech Republic) Barbora Krejčíková	6–2, 4–6, 6–2
Loss	2–3	Nov 2017	Canberra International, Australia	W60	Hard	(Australia) Olivia Rogowska	1–6, 2–6
Loss	2–4	Mar 2018	Clay Court International, Australia	W60	Clay	(Slovenia) Dalila Jakupović	4–6, 4–6
Win	3–4	Apr 2018	ITF Osaka, Japan	W25	Hard	(Canada) Rebecca Marino	6–3, 7–6^{(2)}
Loss	3–5	Sep 2018	ITF Cairns, Australia	W25	Hard	(Australia) Astra Sharma	6–0, 6–7^{(5)}, 1–6
Win	4–5	Mar 2019	Clay Court International, Australia	W25	Clay	(Japan) Risa Ozaki	6–2, 6–2
Loss	4–6	Feb 2020	Launceston International, Australia	W25	Hard	(United States) Asia Muhammad	4–6, 3–6
Loss	4–7	Feb 2020	Perth International, Australia	W25	Hard	(Australia) Maddison Inglis	4–6, 6–7^{(4)}
Loss	4–8	Jul 2022	ITF Caloundra, Australia	W15	Hard	(Australia) Talia Gibson	6–7^{(4)}, 4–6
Loss	4–9	Jul 2022	ITF Caloundra, Australia	W15	Hard	(Australia) Talia Gibson	4–6, 2–3 ret.
Loss	4–10	Sep 2022	Darwin International, Australia	W25	Hard	(Australia) Alexandra Bozovic	1–6, 4–6
Win	5–10	Nov 2022	Traralgon International, Australia	W25	Hard	(Australia) Lizette Cabrera	6–3, 6–7^{(4)}, 6–4
Win	6–10	Aug 2023	ITF Aldershot, United Kingdom	W25	Hard	(Philippines) Alexandra Eala	3–6, 6–4, 6–1
Win	7–10	Sep 2023	ITF Cairns, Australia	W25	Hard	(Australia) Lizette Cabrera	w/o
Win	8–10	Nov 2023	Sydney Challenger, Australia	W60	Hard	(Australia) Astra Sharma	6–3, 6–4
Win	9–10	Oct 2024	ITF Cairns, Australia	W35	Hard	(Australia) Maddison Inglis	6–2, 4–6, 7–5
Win	10–10	Nov 2024	Brisbane QTC International, Australia	W50	Hard	(Australia) Lizette Cabrera	7–6^{(4)}, 4–6, 6–3
Loss	10–11	Feb 2025	Prague Open, Czech Republic	W60	Hard (i)	(Czech Republic) Gabriela Knutson	4–6, 6–3, 5–7
Win	11–11	Jul 2026	ITF Brisbane, Australia	W15	Hard	(Australia) Belle Thompson	6–2, 6–3
Win	12–11	Jul 2026	ITF Brisbane, Australia	W15	Hard	(Japan) Natsuho Arakawa	6–2, 6–1

=== Doubles: 25 (14 titles, 11 runner-ups) ===
Legend W100 tournaments (1–0) W80 tournaments (0–1) W60/75 tournaments (3–5) W40/50 tournaments (1–0) W25/35 tournaments (9–5)	Finals by surface Hard (13–8) Clay (1–3)

Result	W–L	Date	Tournament	Tier	Surface	Partner	Opponents	Score
Loss	0–1	Aug 2018	ITF Nonthaburi, Thailand	W25	Hard	(Australia) Naiktha Bains	(China) Wang Xinyu (China) Wang Xiyu	5–7, 7–5, [4–10]
Loss	0–2	Nov 2018	Canberra International, Australia	W60	Hard	(Australia) Naiktha Bains	(Australia) Ellen Perez (Australia) Arina Rodionova	7–6^{(5)}, 3–6, [7–10]
Loss	0–3	Mar 2019	Clay Court International, Australia	W25	Clay	(Australia) Ellen Perez	(Australia) Naiktha Bains (Slovakia) Tereza Mihalikova	6–4, 2–6, [4–10]
Loss	0–4	Apr 2019	Dothan Pro Classic, United States	W80	Clay	(Australia) Astra Sharma	(United States) Caroline Dolehide (United States) Usue Maitane Arconada	6–7^{(5)}, 4–6
Win	1–4	Sep 2019	Darwin International, Australia	W60	Hard	(Australia) Lizette Cabrera	(Australia) Alison Bai (Australia) Jaimee Fourlis	6–4, 2–6, [10–3]
Win	2–4	Oct 2019	Brisbane QTC International, Australia	W25	Hard	(United Kingdom) Naiktha Bains	(Australia) Alison Bai (New Zealand) Paige Hourigan	6–3, 6–3
Win	3–4	June 2021	ITF Madrid, Spain	W25	Hard	(Australia) Olivia Gadecki	(Japan) Mana Ayukawa (South Korea) Han Na-lae	6–3, 6–3
Loss	3–5	Oct 2022	ITF Cairns, Australia	W25	Hard	(Australia) Lisa Mays	(United Kingdom) Naiktha Bains (Australia) Alexandra Bozovic	4–6, 4–6
Win	4–5	Nov 2022	Sydney Challenger, Australia	W60	Hard	(Australia) Lisa Mays	(Australia) Alexandra Osborne (Indonesia) Jessy Rompies	5–7, 6–3, [10–6]
Win	5–5	Nov 2022	ITF Traralgon, Australia	W25	Hard	(New Zealand) Katherine Westbury	(India) Ankita Raina (Indonesia) Priska Madelyn Nugroho	6–1, 4–6, [10–5]
Win	6–5	Feb 2023	Burnie International, Australia	W25	Hard	(United Kingdom) Naiktha Bains	(Australia) Lily Fairclough (Australia) Olivia Gadecki	7–5, 6–3
Loss	6–6	Mar 2023	Clay Court International, Australia	W60	Clay	(Australia) Olivia Gadecki	(Japan) Erina Hayashi (Japan) Yuki Naito	6–7^{(2)}, 5–7
Loss	6–7	June 2023	Open ITF Madrid, Spain	W60	Hard	(Turkey) Berfu Cengiz	(United States) Makenna Jones (United States) Jamie Loeb	4–6, 7–5, [6–10]
Win	7–7	Jul 2023	ITF Foxhills, UK	W25	Hard	(India) Rutuja Bhosale	(Australia) Talia Gibson (Australia) Petra Hule	6–2, 6–3
Win	8–7	Aug 2023	ITF Aldershot, UK	W25	Hard	(United Kingdom) Sarah Beth Grey	(Japan) Erina Hayashi (Japan) Saki Imamura	6–4, 6–3
Win	9–7	Sep 2023	ITF Perth, Australia	W25	Hard	(Australia) Maddison Inglis	(Japan) Misaki Matsuda (Japan) Naho Sato	6–1, 6–4
Win	10–7	Sep 2023	ITF Perth, Australia	W25	Hard	(Australia) Maddison Inglis	(Australia) Talia Gibson (Australia) Taylah Preston	6–3, 7–6^{(3)}
Win	11–7	Oct 2023	ITF Cairns, Australia	W25	Hard	(Australia) Taylah Preston	(Australia) Roisin Gilheany (Australia) Alicia Smith	7–6^{(5)}, 7–5
Win	12–7	Oct 2023	Sydney Challenger, Australia	W60	Hard	(Australia) Maddison Inglis	(Japan) Kyōka Okamura (Japan) Ayano Shimizu	6–0, 6–0
Loss	12–8	Nov 2023	Brisbane QTC International, Australia	W60	Hard	(Australia) Maddison Inglis	(Australia) Talia Gibson (Australia) Priscilla Hon	6–4, 5–7, [5–10]
Loss	12–9	Feb 2024	ITF Traralgon, Australia	W35	Hard	(Australia) Tenika McGiffin	(Japan) Yuki Naito (Japan) Naho Sato	1–6, 3–6
Win	13–9	May 2024	Open Villa de Madrid, Spain	W100	Clay	(Greece) Eleni Christofi	(Venezuela) Andrea Gámiz (Netherlands) Eva Vedder	6–3, 2–6, [10–5]
Loss	13–10	Oct 2024	ITF Cairns, Australia	W35	Hard	(Australia) Alexandra Bozovic	(Australia) Petra Hule (Australia) Alana Parnaby	6–3, 2–6, [2–10]
Loss	13–11	Oct 2024	Sydney Challenger, Australia	W75	Hard	(Australia) Maddison Inglis	(Australia) Lizette Cabrera (Australia) Taylah Preston	1–6, 6–3, [8–10]
Win	14–11	Nov 2024	Brisbane QTC International, Australia	W50	Hard	(Australia) Maddison Inglis	(Japan) Yuki Naito (India) Ankita Raina	6–3, 6–4

== Wins over top-10 players ==
#	Player	Rank	Tournament	Surface	Rd	Score	DAR
2019
1.	(Belarus) Aryna Sabalenka	No. 10	Rosmalen Open, Netherlands	Grass	1R	7–6^{(3)}, 1–6, 6–4	No. 214
