= 2018 JSM Challenger of Champaign–Urbana – Singles =

Urbana – Singles
- 2018 JSM Challenger of Champaign–Urbana

Final
- Champion: (United States) Reilly Opelka
- Runner-up: (United States) Ryan Shane
- Score: 7–6^{(8–6)}, 6–3

Events
Singles	Doubles
- JSM Challenger of Champaign–Urbana

Tim Smyczek was the defending champion but chose not to defend his title.

Reilly Opelka won the title after defeating Ryan Shane 7–6^{(8–6)}, 6–3 in the final.

== Seeds ==
1. (Spain) Marcel Granollers (second round)
2. (France) Ugo Humbert (first round)
3. (Canada) Peter Polansky (second round)
4. (United States) Reilly Opelka (champion)
5. (Switzerland) Henri Laaksonen (first round, retired)
6. (Serbia) Nikola Milojević (first round)
7. (United States) Christopher Eubanks (quarterfinals)
8. (Australia) John-Patrick Smith (quarterfinals)

== Draw ==
Key

- Q = Qualifier
- WC = Wild card
- LL = Lucky loser
- Alt = Alternate
- ITF = ITF entry
- PR = Protected ranking
- SR = Special ranking
- SE = Special exempt
- JE = Junior exempt
- JR = Junior Accelerator Programme entrant
- CO = College Accelerator Programme entrant
- NG = Next Gen Accelerator Program entrant
- w/o = Walkover
- r = Retired
- d = Defaulted

=== Finals ===
Semifinals
Q	(United States) Ryan Shane	6	6
(Slovenia) Blaž Rola	4	3
4	(United States) Reilly Opelka	2	6	6
(United States) Tommy Paul	6	4	4

Final
Q	(United States) Ryan Shane	6^{6}	3
4	(United States) Reilly Opelka	7^{8}	6

=== Top half ===
First round
1	(Spain) M Granollers	6	6
Alt	(United States) A Ritschard	1	1
Q	(United States) R Shane	6	6
Q	(United States) Keenan Mayo	3	4
WC	(United States) Ezekiel Clark	3	6	3
(Zimbabwe) T Garanganga	6	0	6
(Kazakhstan) D Yevseyev	3	6^{1}
8	(Australia) J-P Smith	6	7^{7}
3	(Canada) P Polansky	7	6
WC	(United States) P Kypson	5	2
WC	(United States) Alexander Brown	2	6^{6}
(Slovenia) B Rola	6	7^{8}
Q	(South Africa) R Roelofse	3	4
LL	(United States) A Ayeni	6	6
(United States) S Bangoura	6	3
5	(Switzerland) H Laaksonen	4	0^{r}

Second round
1	(Spain) M Granollers	3	4
Q	(United States) R Shane	6	6
(Zimbabwe) T Garanganga	3	4
8	(Australia) J-P Smith	6	6
3	(Canada) P Polansky	3	4
(Slovenia) B Rola	6	6
LL	(United States) A Ayeni	7^{7}	2	3
(United States) S Bangoura	6^{3}	6	6

Quarterfinals
Q	(United States) R Shane	7	6
8	(Australia) J-P Smith	5	1
(Slovenia) B Rola	7^{7}	6
(United States) S Bangoura	6^{2}	3

Semifinals
Q	(United States) R Shane	6	6
(Slovenia) B Rola	4	3

=== Bottom half ===
First round
6	(Serbia) N Milojević	3	3
(Sweden) M Ymer	6	6
(France) TK Wang	6	6
(United States) JC Aragone	3	1
WC	(United States) S Korda	5	7^{7}	4
(Japan) K Uchida	7	6^{5}	6
(United Kingdom) L Glasspool	6^{3}	6^{2}
4	(United States) R Opelka	7^{7}	7^{7}
7	(United States) C Eubanks	6	3	6
(United States) K King	4	6	3
(Finland) H Heliövaara	3	7	6
Q	(Denmark) M Torpegaard	6	5	4
(United States) J. J. Wolf	5	5
(United States) Jared Hiltzik	7	7
(United States) T Paul	6	4	6
2	(France) U Humbert	4	6	2

Second round
(Sweden) M Ymer	1	4
(France) TK Wang	6	6
(Japan) K Uchida	7^{7}	4	6^{3}
4	(United States) R Opelka	6^{3}	6	7^{7}
7	(United States) C Eubanks	w/o
(Finland) H Heliövaara
(United States) J Hiltzik	6^{3}	4
(United States) T Paul	7^{7}	6

Quarterfinals
(France) TK Wang	2	2
4	(United States) R Opelka	6	6
7	(United States) C Eubanks	2	6^{3}
(United States) T Paul	6	7^{7}

Semifinals
4	(United States) R Opelka	2	6	6
(United States) T Paul	6	4	4

== Bibliography ==
- Main Draw
- Qualifying Draw
