= 2020 Delray Beach Open – Singles =

Singles
- 2020 Delray Beach Open

Final
- Champion: (United States) Reilly Opelka
- Runner-up: (Japan) Yoshihito Nishioka
- Score: 7–5, 6–7^{(4–7)}, 6–2

Details
- Draw: 32 (4 Q / 3 WC )
- Seeds: 8

Events
Singles	Doubles
- Delray Beach Open

Radu Albot was the defending champion, but lost in the first round to Jack Sock.

Reilly Opelka won the title, defeating Yoshihito Nishioka in the final, 7–5, 6–7^{(4–7)}, 6–2. Opelka saved a match point against Milos Raonic in the semifinals.

== Seeds ==
1. (Australia) Nick Kyrgios (withdrew)
2. (Canada) Milos Raonic (semifinals)
3. (United States) Taylor Fritz (first round)
4. (United States) Reilly Opelka (champion)
5. (Australia) John Millman (first round)
6. (France) Ugo Humbert (semifinals)
7. (France) Adrian Mannarino (first round)
8. (Moldova) Radu Albot (first round)

== Draw ==
Key

- Q = Qualifier
- WC = Wild card
- LL = Lucky loser
- Alt = Alternate
- ITF = ITF entry
- PR = Protected ranking
- SR = Special ranking
- SE = Special exempt
- JE = Junior exempt
- JR = Junior Accelerator Programme entrant
- CO = College Accelerator Programme entrant
- NG = Next Gen Accelerator Program entrant
- w/o = Walkover
- r = Retired
- d = Defaulted

=== Finals ===
Semifinals
6	(France) Ugo Humbert	6	4	0
(Japan) Yoshihito Nishioka	1	6	6
4	(United States) Reilly Opelka	4	7^{8}	6
2	(Canada) Milos Raonic	6	6^{6}	3

Final
(Japan) Yoshihito Nishioka	5	7^{7}	2
4	(United States) Reilly Opelka	7	6^{4}	6

=== Top half ===
First round
LL	(Colombia) DE Galán	2	4
(United States) T Paul	6	6
Q	(Ecuador) E Gómez	6^{3}	2
(United States) F Tiafoe	7^{7}	6
(Serbia) M Kecmanović	6	0
(Australia) J Thompson	2	0^{r}
LL	(United States) S Kozlov	7^{7}	3	1
6	(France) U Humbert	6^{5}	6	6
3	(United States) T Fritz	4	7^{7}	4
Q	(United Kingdom) C Norrie	6	6^{4}	6
(Czech Republic) J Veselý	6^{4}	1
WC	(United States) B Nakashima	7^{7}	6
Q	(United States) N Rubin	6	4
SE	(Chinese Taipei) J Jung	3	3^{r}
(Japan) Y Nishioka	3	6	6
5	(Australia) J Millman	6	4	2

Second round
(United States) T Paul	5	6^{4}
(United States) F Tiafoe	7	7^{7}
(Serbia) M Kecmanović	4	6^{6}
6	(France) U Humbert	6	7^{8}
Q	(United Kingdom) C Norrie	5	2
WC	(United States) B Nakashima	7	6
Q	(United States) N Rubin	1	2
(Japan) Y Nishioka	6	6

Quarterfinals
(United States) F Tiafoe	1	2
6	(France) U Humbert	6	6
WC	(United States) B Nakashima	6	6^{5}	4
(Japan) Y Nishioka	3	7^{7}	6

Semifinals
6	(France) U Humbert	6	4	0
(Japan) Y Nishioka	1	6	6

=== Bottom half ===
First round
7	(France) A Mannarino	6	3	2
(South Korea) S-w Kwon	1	6	6
WC	(United States) R Harrison	6	6
(Bosnia and Herzegovina) D Džumhur	3	2
PR	(United States) M McDonald	6	7^{7}
(Japan) Y Uchiyama	2	6^{5}
Q	(Latvia) E Gulbis	7^{7}	4	6^{4}
4	(United States) R Opelka	6^{5}	6	7^{7}
8	(Moldova) R Albot	6	3	6^{2}
WC	(United States) J Sock	3	6	7^{7}
(Switzerland) H Laaksonen	6^{5}	4
(United States) S Johnson	7^{7}	6
PR	(Germany) C-M Stebe	6	3	6
LL	(Australia) B Tomic	2	6	2
LL	(Uzbekistan) D Istomin	2	2
2	(Canada) M Raonic	6	6

Second round
(South Korea) S-w Kwon	6	3	7^{7}
WC	(United States) R Harrison	4	6	6^{0}
PR	(United States) M McDonald	3	4
4	(United States) R Opelka	6	6
WC	(United States) J Sock	4	7	1
(United States) S Johnson	6	5	6
PR	(Germany) C-M Stebe	5	3
2	(Canada) M Raonic	7	6

Quarterfinals
(South Korea) S-w Kwon	3	4
4	(United States) R Opelka	6	6
(United States) S Johnson	6^{6}	3
2	(Canada) M Raonic	7^{8}	6

Semifinals
4	(United States) R Opelka	4	7^{8}	6
2	(Canada) M Raonic	6	6^{6}	3

== Qualifying ==
=== Seeds ===
1. (United Kingdom) Cameron Norrie (qualified)
2. (Japan) Taro Daniel (withdrew)
3. (Italy) Paolo Lorenzi (first round)
4. (Australia) Alex Bolt (first round)
5. (Colombia) Daniel Elahi Galán (first round, lucky loser)
6. (Ecuador) Emilio Gómez (qualified)
7. (Serbia) Danilo Petrović (first round)
8. (Uzbekistan) Denis Istomin (qualifying competition, lucky loser)

=== Qualifiers ===
1. (United Kingdom) Cameron Norrie
2. (Latvia) Ernests Gulbis
3. (United States) Noah Rubin
4. (Ecuador) Emilio Gómez

=== Lucky losers ===
1. (Australia) Bernard Tomic
2. (Uzbekistan) Denis Istomin
3. (United States) Stefan Kozlov
4. (Colombia) Daniel Elahi Galán

=== Qualifying draw ===
==== First qualifier ====
First round
1	(United Kingdom) Cameron Norrie	6	6
(Germany) Peter Torebko	2	2
(United States) Mitchell Krueger	6	7^{8}
7	(Serbia) Danilo Petrović	4	6^{6}

Qualifying competition
1	(United Kingdom) Cameron Norrie	4	6	7^{7}
(United States) Mitchell Krueger	6	2	6^{5}

==== Second qualifier ====
First round
Alt	(Spain) Pol Toledo Bagué	1	3
(Australia) Bernard Tomic	6	6
(Latvia) Ernests Gulbis	6	6
5	(Colombia) Daniel Elahi Galán	2	4

Qualifying competition
(Australia) Bernard Tomic	2	0
(Latvia) Ernests Gulbis	6	6

==== Third qualifier ====
First round
3	(Italy) Paolo Lorenzi	5	6^{5}
(United States) Noah Rubin	7	7^{7}
(Spain) Guillermo García López	5	2
8	(Uzbekistan) Denis Istomin	7	6

Qualifying competition
(United States) Noah Rubin	6	3	7^{8}
8	(Uzbekistan) Denis Istomin	4	6	6^{6}

==== Fourth qualifier ====
First round
4	(Australia) Alex Bolt	6	4	2
WC	(United States) Stefan Kozlov	4	6	6
WC	(United States) Preston Brown	2	0
6	(Ecuador) Emilio Gómez	6	6

Qualifying competition
WC	(United States) Stefan Kozlov	3	2
6	(Ecuador) Emilio Gómez	6	6
