= 2016 Charlottesville Men's Pro Challenger – Doubles =

Doubles
- 2016 Charlottesville Men's Pro Challenger

Final
- Champions: (United States) Brian Baker (Australia) Sam Groth
- Runners-up: (United Kingdom) Brydan Klein (South Africa) Ruan Roelofse
- Score: 6–3, 6–3

Events
Singles	Doubles
- Charlottesville Men's Pro Challenger

Chase Buchanan and Tennys Sandgren were the defending champions but only Sandgren chose to defend his title, partnering Austin Krajicek. Sandgren lost in the quarterfinals to Brian Baker and Sam Groth.

Baker and Groth won the title after defeating Brydan Klein and Ruan Roelofse 6–3, 6–3 in the final.

== Seeds ==
1. (United States) Brian Baker / (Australia) Sam Groth (champions)
2. (Canada) Peter Polansky / (Canada) Adil Shamasdin (first round)
3. (United States) Eric Quigley / (United States) Max Schnur (first round)
4. (Australia) Jarryd Chaplin / (New Zealand) Ben McLachlan (first round)

== Draw ==
Key

- Q = Qualifier
- WC = Wild card
- LL = Lucky loser
- Alt = Alternate
- ITF = ITF entry
- PR = Protected ranking
- SR = Special ranking
- SE = Special exempt
- JE = Junior exempt
- JR = Junior Accelerator Programme entrant
- CO = College Accelerator Programme entrant
- NG = Next Gen Accelerator Program entrant
- w/o = Walkover
- r = Retired
- d = Defaulted

First round
1	(United States) B Baker (Australia) S Groth	7^{11}	6
(United States) B Fratangelo (United States) D Kudla	6^{9}	2
(United States) A Krajicek (United States) T Sandgren	4	7^{9}	[10]
(Belgium) R Bemelmans (Belgium) J De Loore	6	6^{7}	[8]
3	(United States) E Quigley (United States) M Schnur	3	2
(Latvia) M Lībietis (United States) D Novikov	6	6
WC	(United States) Jared Hiltzik (United States) R Williams	4	6^{5}
(United Kingdom) L Bambridge (United Kingdom) L Broady	6	7^{7}
(Republic of Ireland) D O'Hare (United Kingdom) J Salisbury	6	6
WC	(Switzerland) A Ritschard (United States) Henrik Wiersholm	4	3
(United Kingdom) B Klein (South Africa) R Roelofse	7^{7}	6^{4}	[10]
4	(Australia) Jarryd Chaplin (New Zealand) B McLachlan	6^{5}	7^{7}	[8]
(United States) S Bangoura (United States) M McDonald	6	7
WC	(United States) Luca Corinteli (United States) F Tiafoe	1	5
Q	(Romania) Dragoș Constantin Ignat (South Africa) T Vorster	6	3	[10]
2	(Canada) P Polansky (Canada) A Shamasdin	3	6	[8]

Quarterfinals
1	(United States) B Baker (Australia) S Groth	6	6
(United States) A Krajicek (United States) T Sandgren	4	4
(Latvia) M Lībietis (United States) D Novikov	6	6
(United Kingdom) L Bambridge (United Kingdom) L Broady	1	4
(Republic of Ireland) D O'Hare (United Kingdom) J Salisbury	3	4
(United Kingdom) B Klein (South Africa) R Roelofse	6	6
(United States) S Bangoura (United States) M McDonald	6	6
Q	(Romania) DC Ignat (South Africa) T Vorster	4	2

Semifinals
1	(United States) B Baker (Australia) S Groth	6	7^{7}
(Latvia) M Lībietis (United States) D Novikov	3	6^{4}
(United Kingdom) B Klein (South Africa) R Roelofse	6	7^{7}
(United States) S Bangoura (United States) M McDonald	3	6^{4}

Final
1	(United States) B Baker (Australia) S Groth	6	6
(United Kingdom) B Klein (South Africa) R Roelofse	3	3
