= 2016 JSM Challenger of Champaign–Urbana – Doubles =

Urbana – Doubles
- 2016 JSM Challenger of Champaign–Urbana

Final
- Champions: (United States) Austin Krajicek (United States) Tennys Sandgren
- Runners-up: (United Kingdom) Luke Bambridge (United Kingdom) Liam Broady
- Score: 7–6^{(7–4)}, 7–6^{(7–2)}

Events
| Singles | Doubles |
- JSM Challenger of Champaign–Urbana

David O'Hare and Joe Salisbury were the defending champions but lost in the quarterfinals to Dominik Köpfer and Alex Lawson.

Austin Krajicek and Tennys Sandgren won the title after defeating Luke Bambridge and Liam Broady 7–6^{(7–4)}, 7–6^{(7–2)} in the final.

== Seeds ==
1. (United States) Brian Baker / (Australia) Sam Groth (withdrew)
2. (United States) Sekou Bangoura / (South Africa) Dean O'Brien (first round)
3. (Latvia) Miķelis Lībietis / (United States) Max Schnur (first round)
4. (New Zealand) Ben McLachlan / (United States) Eric Quigley (quarterfinals)

== Draw ==
Key

- Q = Qualifier
- WC = Wild card
- LL = Lucky loser
- Alt = Alternate
- ITF = ITF entry
- PR = Protected ranking
- SR = Special ranking
- SE = Special exempt
- JE = Junior exempt
- JR = Junior Accelerator Programme entrant
- CO = College Accelerator Programme entrant
- NG = Next Gen Accelerator Program entrant
- w/o = Walkover
- r = Retired
- d = Defaulted

First round
LL | (France) Noe Khlif (United States) T Kopinski | 6 | 6^{6} | [5]
WC | (United States) Gui Gomes (United States) Jared Hiltzik | 3 | 7^{8} | [10]
(United States) A Krajicek (United States) T Sandgren | w/o
WC | (United States) Jonathan Ho (United States) N Rubin
4 | (New Zealand) B McLachlan (United States) E Quigley | 6 | 5 | [10]
Q | (Italy) Erik Crepaldi (Romania) Dragoș Constantin Ignat | 4 | 7 | [4]
(United States) M Mmoh (Netherlands) T van Rijthoven
(Mexico) H Hach Verdugo (United States) M Krueger | w/o
WC | (United States) Aron Hiltzik (United States) A Kovacevic | 4 | 4
(Germany) D Köpfer (United States) A Lawson | 6 | 6
(Republic of Ireland) D O'Hare (United Kingdom) J Salisbury | 3 | 6 | [10]
3 | (Latvia) M Lībietis (United States) M Schnur | 6 | 3 | [8]
(South Africa) R Roelofse (South Africa) T Vorster | 6 | 7^{7}
(Belgium) R Bemelmans (Belgium) J De Loore | 3 | 6^{5}
(United Kingdom) L Bambridge (United Kingdom) L Broady | 6 | 6
2 | (United States) S Bangoura (South Africa) D O'Brien | 2 | 4

Quarterfinals
WC | (United States) G Gomes (United States) J Hiltzik | 4 | 4
(United States) A Krajicek (United States) T Sandgren | 6 | 6
4 | (New Zealand) B McLachlan (United States) E Quigley | 3 | 3
(Mexico) H Hach Verdugo (United States) M Krueger | 6 | 6
(Germany) D Köpfer (United States) A Lawson | 6 | 1 | [10]
(Republic of Ireland) D O'Hare (United Kingdom) J Salisbury | 4 | 6 | [6]
(South Africa) R Roelofse (South Africa) T Vorster | 6 | 6^{6} | [5]
(United Kingdom) L Bambridge (United Kingdom) L Broady | 4 | 7^{8} | [10]

Semifinals
(United States) A Krajicek (United States) T Sandgren | 4 | 6 | [10]
(Mexico) H Hach Verdugo (United States) M Krueger | 6 | 3 | [5]
(Germany) D Köpfer (United States) A Lawson | 3 | 6 | [9]
(United Kingdom) L Bambridge (United Kingdom) L Broady | 6 | 3 | [11]

Final
(United States) A Krajicek (United States) T Sandgren | 7^{7} | 7^{7}
(United Kingdom) L Bambridge (United Kingdom) L Broady | 6^{4} | 6^{2}
