= 2018 BNP Paribas Primrose Bordeaux – Singles =

Singles
- 2018 BNP Paribas Primrose Bordeaux

Final
- Champion: (United States) Reilly Opelka
- Runner-up: (France) Grégoire Barrère
- Score: 6–7^{(5–7)}, 6–4, 7–5

Events
Singles	Doubles
← 2017 ·	BNP Paribas Primrose Bordeaux	· 2019 →

Steve Darcis was the defending champion but chose not to defend his title.

Reilly Opelka won the title after defeating Grégoire Barrère 6–7^{(5–7)}, 6–4, 7–5 in the final.

== Seeds ==
1. (France) Jérémy Chardy (second round)
2. (France) Pierre-Hugues Herbert (first round)
3. (Moldova) Radu Albot (first round)
4. (France) Nicolas Mahut (first round)
5. (Brazil) Rogério Dutra Silva (first round)
6. (United States) Denis Kudla (first round)
7. (Brazil) Thiago Monteiro (first round)
8. (France) Calvin Hemery (second round)

== Draw ==
=== Key ===
- Q = Qualifier
- WC = Wild card
- LL = Lucky loser
- Alt = Alternate
- SE = Special exempt
- PR = Protected ranking
- ITF = ITF entry
- JE = Junior exempt
- w/o = Walkover
- r = Retired
- d = Defaulted
- SR = Special ranking

=== Finals ===
Semifinals
(Argentina) Guido Andreozzi	7^{7}	6^{4}	2
WC	(France) Grégoire Barrère	6^{3}	7^{7}	6
(Latvia) Ernests Gulbis	3	6^{7}
(United States) Reilly Opelka	6	7^{9}

Final
WC	(France) Grégoire Barrère	7^{7}	4	5
(United States) Reilly Opelka	6^{5}	6	7

=== Top half ===
First round
1	(France) J Chardy	6	6
Q	(Australia) A Popyrin	1	4
Q	(France) A Müller	3	1
(Argentina) G Andreozzi	6	6
WC	(France) U Humbert	2	2
(United States) B Klahn	6	6
Q	(France) M Janvier	5	4
8	(France) C Hemery	7	6
4	(France) N Mahut	3	3
Q	(France) E Benchetrit	6	6
WC	(Ukraine) S Stakhovsky	3	1
(Czech Republic) Z Kolář	6	6
WC	(France) G Barrère	6	6
WC	(Belgium) A De Greef	1	2
(Canada) P Polansky	6	6
7	(Brazil) T Monteiro	4	4

Second round
1	(France) J Chardy	3	6	0
(Argentina) G Andreozzi	6	3	6
(United States) B Klahn	6	7^{7}
8	(France) C Hemery	3	6^{4}
Q	(France) E Benchetrit	6	6
(Czech Republic) Z Kolář	4	4
WC	(France) G Barrère	6	6
(Canada) P Polansky	1	1

Quarterfinals
(Argentina) G Andreozzi	6	6
(United States) B Klahn	3	3
Q	(France) E Benchetrit	6^{5}	2
WC	(France) G Barrère	7^{7}	6

Semifinals
(Argentina) G Andreozzi	7^{7}	6^{4}	2
WC	(France) G Barrère	6^{3}	7^{7}	6

=== Bottom half ===
First round
5	(Brazil) R Dutra Silva	6	3	2
(Latvia) E Gulbis	3	6	6
(France) C Moutet	7^{7}	6
(Argentina) C Berlocq	6^{4}	3
(Kazakhstan) A Bublik	0	3
(France) K de Schepper	6	6
(Spain) D Gimeno Traver	4	6	7
3	(Moldova) R Albot	6	3	5
6	(United States) D Kudla	6	1	0
(France) B Bonzi	4	6	6
(France) C Lestienne	1	4
(United States) R Opelka	6	6
LL	(France) M Bourgue	4	5
Alt	(France) A Hoang	6	7
(United States) S Kozlov	6	7^{7}
2	(France) P-H Herbert	2	6^{5}

Second round
(Latvia) E Gulbis	1	6	6
(France) C Moutet	6	3	2
(France) K de Schepper	1	6^{6}
(Spain) D Gimeno Traver	6	7^{8}
(France) B Bonzi	4	4
(United States) R Opelka	6	6
Alt	(France) A Hoang	3	6^{4}
(United States) S Kozlov	6	7^{7}

Quarterfinals
(Latvia) E Gulbis	5	7^{7}	6
(Spain) D Gimeno Traver	7	6^{4}	4
(United States) R Opelka	7^{7}	6
(United States) S Kozlov	6^{4}	1

Semifinals
(Latvia) E Gulbis	3	6^{7}
(United States) R Opelka	6	7^{9}
