= 2016 Charlottesville Men's Pro Challenger =

- Date: 31 October – 6 November
- Edition: 8th
- Draw: 32S/16D/32QS/4QD
- Prize money: $50,000
- Surface: Indoor Hard
- Location: Charlottesville, United States

Champions

Singles
- (United States) Reilly Opelka

Doubles
- (United States) Brian Baker / (Australia) Sam Groth
← 2015 ·	Charlottesville Men's Pro Challenger	· 2017 →

The 2016 Charlottesville Men's Pro Challenger was a professional tennis tournament played on indoor hard courts. It was the eighth edition of the tournament which was part of the 2016 ATP Challenger Tour, taking place in Charlottesville, United States from October 31 to November 6, 2016.

== Singles main-draw entrants ==
=== Seeds ===
Country	Player	Rank^{1}	Seed
USA	Frances Tiafoe	102	1
USA	Jared Donaldson	109	2
USA	Bjorn Fratangelo	110	3
USA	Denis Kudla	131	4
USA	Tim Smyczek	133	5
SUI	Henri Laaksonen	134	6
CAN	Peter Polansky	148	7
USA	Dennis Novikov	157	8

- ^{1} Rankings are as of October 24, 2016.

=== Other entrants ===
The following players received wildcards into the singles main draw:

- (United States) Mackenzie McDonald
- (Switzerland) Alexander Ritschard
- (United States) Ryan Shane
- (Sweden) Carl Söderlund

The following players received entry from the qualifying draw:

- (United States) JC Aragone
- (India) Yuki Bhambri
- (United States) Gonzales Austin
- (United States) Thai-Son Kwiatkowski

== Champions ==
=== Singles ===
- (United States) Reilly Opelka def. (Belgium) Ruben Bemelmans, 6–4, 2–6, 7–6^{(7–5)}.

=== Doubles ===
- (United States) Brian Baker / (Australia) Sam Groth def. (United Kingdom) Brydan Klein / (South Africa) Ruan Roelofse, 6–3, 6–3.
