= 2018 JSM Challenger of Champaign–Urbana =

- Date: 12 November – 17 November
- Edition: 23rd
- Surface: Hard
- Location: Champaign, Illinois, United States

Champions

Singles
- (United States) Reilly Opelka

Doubles
- (Australia) Matt Reid / (Australia) John-Patrick Smith
← 2017 ·	JSM Challenger of Champaign–Urbana	· 2019 →

The 2018 JSM Challenger of Champaign–Urbana was a professional tennis tournament played on hard courts. It was the twenty-third edition of the tournament which was part of the 2018 ATP Challenger Tour. It took place in Champaign, Illinois, United States between November 12 and November 17, 2018.

== Singles main-draw entrants ==
=== Seeds ===
Country	Player	Rank^{1}	Seed
ESP	Marcel Granollers	96	1
FRA	Ugo Humbert	98	2
CAN	Peter Polansky	120	3
USA	Reilly Opelka	134	4
SUI	Henri Laaksonen	163	5
SRB	Nikola Milojević	172	6
USA	Christopher Eubanks	188	7
AUS	John-Patrick Smith	202	8

- ^{1} Rankings are as of November 5, 2018.

=== Other entrants ===
The following players received wildcards into the singles main draw:

- (United States) Alexander Brown
- (United States) Ezekiel Clark
- (United States) Sebastian Korda
- (United States) Patrick Kypson

The following player received entry into the singles main draw as an alternate:

- (United States) Alexander Ritschard

The following players received entry from the qualifying draw:

- (United States) Keenan Mayo
- (South Africa) Ruan Roelofse
- (United States) Ryan Shane
- (Denmark) Mikael Torpegaard

The following player received entry as a lucky loser:

- (United States) Alafia Ayeni

== Champions ==
=== Singles ===
- (United States) Reilly Opelka def. (United States) Ryan Shane 7–6^{(8–6)}, 6–3.

=== Doubles ===
- (Australia) Matt Reid / (Australia) John-Patrick Smith def. (Mexico) Hans Hach Verdugo / (Venezuela) Luis David Martínez 6–4, 4–6, [10–8].
