= 2017 JSM Challenger of Champaign–Urbana =

- Date: 13 November – 18 November
- Edition: 22nd
- Surface: Hard
- Location: Champaign, Illinois, United States

Champions

Singles
- (United States) Tim Smyczek

Doubles
- (India) Leander Paes / (India) Purav Raja
← 2016 ·	JSM Challenger of Champaign–Urbana	· 2018 →

The 2017 JSM Challenger of Champaign–Urbana was a professional tennis tournament played on hard courts. It was the twenty-second edition of the tournament which was part of the 2017 ATP Challenger Tour. It took place in Champaign, Illinois, United States between November 13 and November 18, 2017.

== Singles main-draw entrants ==
=== Seeds ===
Country	Player	Rank^{1}	Seed
USA	Tennys Sandgren	85	1
SUI	Henri Laaksonen	103	2
USA	Taylor Fritz	111	3
GBR	Cameron Norrie	115	4
USA	Bjorn Fratangelo	119	5
USA	Michael Mmoh	145	6
USA	Tim Smyczek	158	7
USA	Tommy Paul	159	8

- ^{1} Rankings are as of November 6, 2017.

=== Other entrants ===
The following players received wildcards into the singles main draw:

- (United States) Aron Hiltzik
- (United States) Jared Hiltzik
- (United States) Dennis Nevolo
- (Australia) Aleksandar Vukic

The following players received entry from the qualifying draw:

- (Canada) Samuel Monette
- (United States) Ronnie Schneider
- (United Kingdom) Alexander Ward
- (Sweden) Mikael Ymer

== Champions ==
=== Singles ===
- (United States) Tim Smyczek def. (United States) Bjorn Fratangelo 6–2, 6–4.

=== Doubles ===
- (India) Leander Paes / (India) Purav Raja def. (South Africa) Ruan Roelofse / (United Kingdom) Joe Salisbury 6–3, 6–7^{(5–7)}, [10–5].
