= 2016 JSM Challenger of Champaign–Urbana =

- Date: 14 November – 19 November
- Edition: 21st
- Surface: Hard
- Location: Champaign, Illinois, United States

Champions

Singles
- (Switzerland) Henri Laaksonen

Doubles
- (United States) Austin Krajicek / (United States) Tennys Sandgren
← 2015 ·	JSM Challenger of Champaign–Urbana	· 2017 →

The 2016 JSM Challenger of Champaign–Urbana is a professional tennis tournament played on hard courts. It was the twenty-first edition of the tournament which was part of the 2016 ATP Challenger Tour. It took place in Champaign, Illinois, United States between November 14 and November 19, 2016.

== Singles main-draw entrants ==
=== Seeds ===
Country	Player	Rank^{1}	Seed
USA	Jared Donaldson	108	1
SUI	Henri Laaksonen	135	2
USA	Stefan Kozlov	152	3
BEL	Joris De Loore	174	4
AUS	Sam Groth	184	5
BEL	Ruben Bemelmans	190	6
USA	Noah Rubin	200	7
USA	Reilly Opelka	208	8

- ^{1} Rankings are as of November 7, 2016.

=== Other entrants ===
The following players received wildcards into the singles main draw:

- (United States) Christopher Eubanks
- (United States) Aron Hiltzik
- (United States) Jared Hiltzik
- (France) Noe Khlif

The following player received entry as an alternate:

- (United States) Raymond Sarmiento

The following players received entry from the qualifying draw:

- (United Kingdom) Daniel Cox
- (United States) Marcos Giron
- (United States) Bradley Klahn
- (United States) Ryan Shane

== Champions ==
=== Singles ===
- (Switzerland) Henri Laaksonen def. (Belgium) Ruben Bemelmans, 7–5, 6–3.

=== Doubles ===
- (United States) Austin Krajicek / (United States) Tennys Sandgren def. (United Kingdom) Luke Bambridge / (United Kingdom) Liam Broady, 7–6^{(7–4)}, 7–6^{(7–2)}.
