= Reilly Opelka =

American tennis player (born 1997)

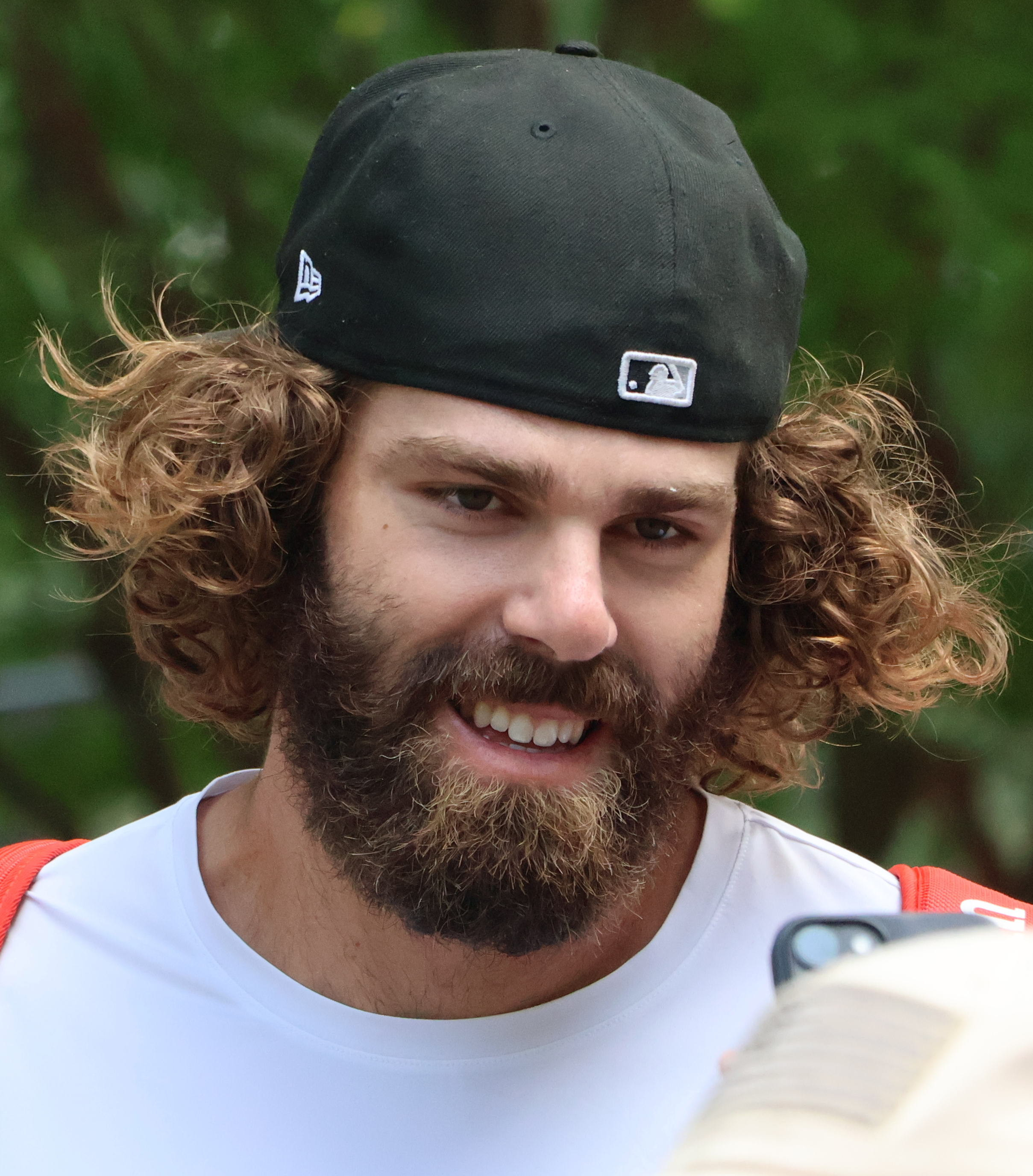
- Opelka in 2024
- Country (sports): United States
- Residence: Delray Beach, Florida, US
- Born: August 28, 1997 (age 29) St. Joseph, Michigan, US
- Height: 6 ft 11 in (2.11 m)
- Turned pro: 2015
- Plays: Right-handed (two-handed backhand)
- Coach: Craig Boynton (2026-), Jay Berger, Denis Kudla (2024-2025)
- Prize money: US $6,150,025

Singles
- Career record: 127–124
- Career titles: 4
- Highest ranking: No. 17 (February 28, 2022)
- Current ranking: No. 153 (August 31, 2026)

Grand Slam singles results
- Australian Open: 3R (2022)
- French Open: 3R (2021)
- Wimbledon: 3R (2019)
- US Open: 4R (2021)

Doubles
- Career record: 21–26
- Career titles: 1
- Highest ranking: No. 89 (August 2, 2021)

Grand Slam doubles results
- French Open: 1R (2019)
- US Open: 2R (2017)

Team competitions
- Davis Cup: QF (2024)
- Last updated on: September 1, 2026.

Reilly Opelka (born August 28, 1997) is an American professional tennis player. He has a career-high ATP singles ranking of world No. 17, achieved on February 28, 2022 and a best doubles ranking of No. 89, reached on August 2, 2021. He has won five ATP Tour titles combined, four in singles and one in doubles.

At 6 feet 11 inches (2.11 m), Opelka and Croatian Ivo Karlović are the tallest players in Tour history. This height is an asset, as he can produce serves that measure over 140 miles per hour (225 km/h).

== Early life ==
Opelka was born in St. Joseph, Michigan, United States and moved to Palm Coast, Florida at age 4. He did not start playing tennis regularly until his admission at USTA Training Center in Boca Raton at 12-years-old. He rapidly took part in junior tournaments.

== Juniors ==
Opelka had good results on the ITF junior circuit. He won the boys' singles category at 2015 Wimbledon Championships, defeating wildcard Mikael Ymer in the final. He was also a runner-up on the doubles event, partnering with Akira Santillan.

He reached an ITF junior combined ranking of world No. 4 on 13 July 2015.

== Professional career ==
=== Early years ===
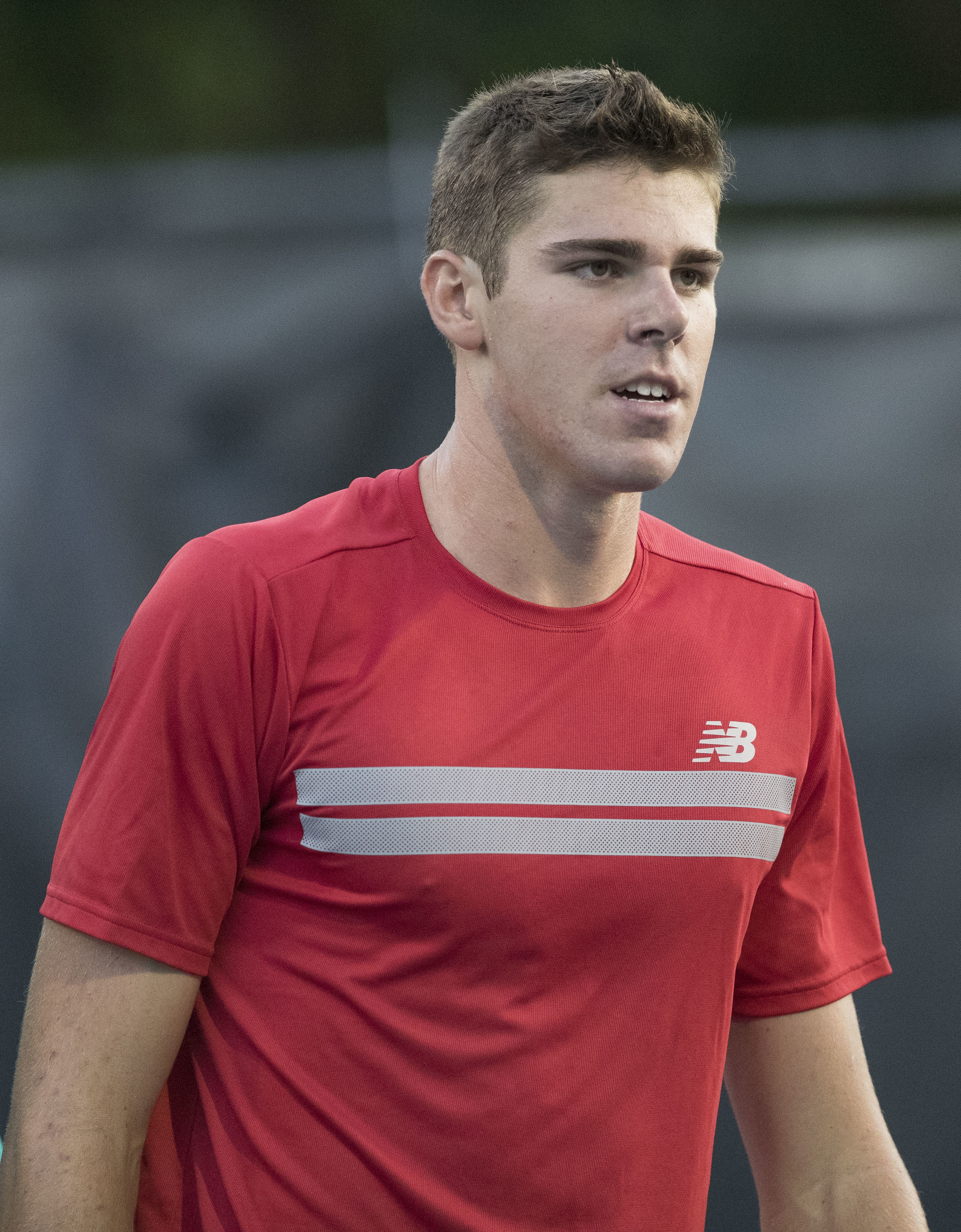
Opelka at the 2016 Citi Open.

Opelka made his ATP debut at the 2016 U.S. Men's Clay Court Championships, where he lost in the first round to fifth seed Sam Querrey. In August, Opelka won his first three career ATP matches at the Atlanta Open to reach the semifinals at just his third career ATP event. This included a victory over 203 cm player No. 27 Kevin Anderson in which he saved two match points on Anderson's serve. He lost in the semi-finals to top seed John Isner. He continued his momentum with first round wins at the Los Cabos Open and the Cincinnati Masters where he defeated Sergiy Stakhovsky and Jérémy Chardy respectively to move into the top 300 of the ATP rankings. After struggling with a foot injury towards the end of the summer, Opelka returned to the USTA Pro Circuit for the indoor season and won his first ATP Challenger title in Charlottesville to finish the year just outside the top 200.

In 2017, Opelka got off to a good start to the season by qualifying for the Australian Open. He played No. 11 seed David Goffin in the first round and pushed him to five sets before taking the loss. At the Memphis Open, he recorded his only ATP Tour level win of the year over fellow Next Gen American Jared Donaldson.

=== 2018: Breakthrough, top 100 year-end ranking ===
2018 proved to be a breakthrough year for Opelka. He won three ATP Challenger titles in the season, the first American to do so since Bradley Klahn in 2014. He won his first title of the season at the Bordeaux Challenger in May. In November, he won back to back titles at the Knoxville Challenger and the JSM Challenger. He also finished as a runner-up at Cary Challenger and Oracle Challenger.

On the ATP World Tour, he reached the quarterfinals at the Delray Beach Open, picking up his first top 10 win of his burgeoning career, defeating world No. 8, Jack Sock, in the second round.

His solid performance on the ATP Challenger Tour earned him his first top-100 year-end finish in singles, ending the season at world No. 99.

=== 2019: First ATP title, top 50 debut ===
At the Australian Open, Opelka upset compatriot and ninth seed John Isner in the first round. This was the second top 10 win of his career. In February, Opelka again defeated Isner, saving six match points, en route to his first ATP title at the New York Open. At Wimbledon in July, he achieved his best Grand Slam result to date, reaching the tournament's third round and defeating Stan Wawrinka in the process. Over the summer and fall, he reached the semifinals of tournaments in Atlanta, Tokyo, and Basel. In November, he participated in the Davis Cup Finals for the United States, ultimately losing both his rubbers. He finished the season ranked 36th in the world.

=== 2020: Second ATP title, Masters 1000 quarterfinal ===
In February, Opelka lifted his second career trophy at the Delray Beach Open after saving a match point in the semifinals against Milos Raonic. After an extended break due to the ongoing COVID-19 pandemic, play resumed and Opelka reached his first ATP Tour Masters level quarterfinal at the Cincinnati Masters. En route he earned his fifth career top 10 win, defeating Matteo Berrettini.

=== 2021: Masters 1000 final, top 20 debut ===
Opelka chose not to defend his Delray Beach title. Instead, he began the season at the Great Ocean Road Open as the sixth seed, but lost to Botic van de Zandschulp in the second round. At the Australian Open, he beat Lu Yen-hsun before losing to 27th seed Taylor Fritz, despite holding match points in the fourth set.

In Rome, Opelka beat Richard Gasquet, Lorenzo Musetti, Aslan Karatsev and Federico Delbonis to reach his first Masters semifinal, where he lost to Rafael Nadal.

Seeded 32nd at the French Open, Opelka beat clay-court specialists Andrej Martin and Jaume Munar to reach the third round, his best showing at this Grand Slam event, where he lost to Daniil Medvedev.

Partnering with Jannik Sinner, Opelka won his first doubles title at the Atlanta Open. The pair defeated Steve Johnson and Jordan Thompson in the final. As a result, he entered the top 100 in doubles at No. 89 on 2 August 2021. At the same tournament in singles he fell in the quarterfinals to Taylor Fritz.

At the Canada Masters in Toronto, Opelka reached his second Masters 1000 semifinal by defeating Nick Kyrgios, 14th seed Grigor Dimitrov, Lloyd Harris and 10th seed Roberto Bautista Agut. He then upset 3rd seed and world No. 3, Stefanos Tsitsipas, to reach his first ATP Masters 1000 final. It was also his first win over a top 5 player. Opelka would lose to 1st seed and world No. 2 Daniil Medvedev in the final. With this successful run, he entered the top 25 in the ATP singles rankings for the first time at world No. 23 on August 16, 2021.

At the US Open, Opelka reached the fourth round of a Major for the first time in his career. There, he lost to Lloyd Harris in four sets. From this run, he cracked the top 20 in the ATP singles rankings for the first time at world No. 19 on September 13, 2021.

=== 2022: Third and Fourth ATP titles, hiatus ===
At the 2022 Australian Open, Opelka reached the third round, where he lost to Denis Shapovalov. At the inaugural edition of the Dallas Open, Opelka won his third singles title after defeating Jenson Brooksby. In the semifinals, he defeated fellow American John Isner 7–6^{(9–7)}, 7–6^{(24–22)}. The 46-point tiebreak in the second set was the longest-ever at the ATP Tour level. At the 2022 Delray Beach Open, Opelka reached his second final in as many weeks, losing to Cameron Norrie. As a result, he reached a new career-high ranking of world No. 18 on February 21, 2022, and world No. 17 a week later.

At the Indian Wells Open, Opelka reached the fourth round for the first time in his career at this Masters where he lost to fourth seed Rafael Nadal. At the 2022 U.S. Men's Clay Court Championships, Opelka won his second title of the year and fourth of his career, defeating compatriot John Isner in what was the tallest ATP Tour final in the Open Era. At the Madrid Open Opelka lost to Sebastian Korda. The Italian Open saw a defeat to Stan Wawrinka, and at the 2022 French Open to Filip Krajinović, with all losses being in the first round.

=== 2023-25: Return to Top 100, 100th win, ATP final ===
At the end of October 2023, Opelka returned to the ATP Challenger Tour at the 2023 Charlottesville Men's Pro Challenger after close to a year and a half of hiatus primarily due to a wrist injury, defeating Tennys Sandgren in straight sets in the first round. However, he retired in the second round.

After another 8 months hiatus, Opelka returned in mid July 2024 to the ATP Tour with a wildcard main draw entry into the 2024 Hall of Fame Open and defeated Constant Lestienne in three sets in the opening round to secure his first victory at that level for two years. Opelka continued his comeback with a victory over top seed Adrian Mannarino in round two. In the quarterfinals he defeated Mackenzie McDonald in three sets to become the lowest ranked player in history to make an ATP level semifinal where his run came to an end against Alex Michelsen. As a result he moved more than 750 positions up into the top 430 on July 22, 2024. Ranked No. 371, he received main draw wildcards for the Washington Open where he reached the second round, and for the Cincinnati Open.

Opelka reached his first final since Houston in 2022 at the 2025 Brisbane International with an upset over top seed Novak Djokovic in the quarterfinals (his eighth top-10 win), and then over Giovanni Mpetshi Perricard, recording his 100th career win and returning to the top 200 in the rankings to world No. 171. He was the second lowest-ranked player to defeat Djokovic after Filip Krajinovic. He was forced to retire in the final against Jiří Lehečka, due to back issues.

Despite these injury concerns, Opelka made a victorious start at the 2025 Australian Open, defeating Belgian Gauthier Onclin. He lost to Tomáš Macháč in five sets in the second round.

At the 2025 Libéma Open, Opelka reached the semifinals as a lucky loser, defeating top seed Daniil Medvedev, after three consecutive double faults from the Russian in the last three service points of the deciding tiebreak. He was the second lucky loser to advance to the 's-Hertogenbosch semifinals after Rinky Hijikata in 2023.

== Personal life ==
Opelka credits tennis coach Tom Gullikson, whom his father knew from playing golf, for much of his early development as a player. He is close friends with countryman Taylor Fritz and was the best man at Fritz's wedding. He also has a long friendship with tennis legend Venus Williams.

Opelka's uncle is radio talk show host Mike Opelka.

The American is an avid supporter of Chicago-based sports teams, namely the Chicago Bulls (NBA), the Chicago Bears (NFL) the Chicago Blackhawks (NHL), and the Chicago White Sox (MLB). He is a supporter of the SS Lazio soccer team.

== Performance timelines ==
Key
W	F	SF	QF	#R	RR	Q#	P#	DNQ	A	Z#	PO	G	S	B	NMS	NTI	P	NH

(W) winner; (F) finalist; (SF) semifinalist; (QF) quarterfinalist; (#R) rounds 4, 3, 2, 1; (RR) round-robin stage; (Q#) qualification round; (P#) preliminary round; (DNQ) did not qualify; (A) absent; (Z#) Davis/Fed Cup Zonal Group (with number indication) or (PO) play-off; (G) gold, (S) silver or (B) bronze Olympic/Paralympic medal; (NMS) not a Masters tournament; (NTI) not a Tier I tournament; (P) postponed; (NH) not held; (SR) strike rate (events won / competed); (W–L) win–loss record.
To avoid confusion and double counting, these charts are updated at the conclusion of a tournament or when the player's participation has ended.

=== Singles ===
Current through the 2026 Italian Open.

Tournament	2015	2016	2017	2018	2019	2020	2021	2022	2023	2024	2025	2026	SR	W–L	Win %
Grand Slam tournaments
Australian Open	A	A	1R	Q1	2R	1R	2R	3R	A	A	2R	2R	0 / 7	6–7	46%
French Open	A	A	Q3	Q2	1R	1R	3R	1R	A	A	2R		0 / 5	3–5	38%
Wimbledon	A	A	Q1	Q2	3R	NH	1R	2R	A	A	2R		0 / 4	4–4	50%
US Open	Q2	Q2	Q2	Q1	2R	1R	4R	A	A	1R	1R		0 / 5	4–5	44%
Win–loss	0–0	0–0	0–1	0–0	4–4	0–3	6–4	3–3	0–0	0–1	3–4	1–1	0 / 21	17–21	45%
ATP 1000 tournaments
Indian Wells Open	A	A	1R	1R	1R	NH	3R	4R	A	A	1R	2R	0 / 7	4–7	36%
Miami Open	A	A	Q2	Q1	3R	NH	2R	2R	A	A	3R	3R	0 / 5	6–5	55%
Monte-Carlo Masters	A	A	A	A	A	NH	A	A	A	A	A	A	0 / 0	0–0	–
Madrid Open	A	A	A	A	2R	NH	1R	1R	A	A	2R	1R	0 / 5	2–5	29%
Italian Open	A	A	A	A	Q2	A	SF	1R	A	A	1R	A	0 / 3	4–3	57%
Canadian Open	A	A	1R	A	A	NH	F	A	A	A	3R		0 / 3	7–3	70%
Cincinnati Open	A	2R	Q1	A	2R	QF	2R	A	A	1R	3R		0 / 6	8–6	57%
Shanghai Masters	A	A	A	A	2R	NH			A	1R	1R		0 / 3	1–3	25%
Paris Masters	A	A	A	A	A	A	2R	A	A	A	1R		0 / 2	1–2	33%
Win–loss	0–0	1–1	0–2	0–1	5–5	3–1	12–7	2–4	0–0	0–2	7–8	3–3	0 / 34	33–34	49%
Career statistics
Tournaments	0	5	8	2	22	9	21	17	0	8	23	7	Career total: 122		
Titles	0	0	0	0	1	1	0	2	0	0	0	0	Career total: 4		
Finals	0	0	0	0	1	1	1	3	0	0	1	0	Career total: 7		
Overall win–loss	0–0	5–5	1–8	2–2	27–23	12–8	21–23	21–15	0–0	7–8	25–24	6–7	4 / 122	127–123	51%
Win %	–	50%	11%	50%	54%	60%	48%	58%	–	47%	51%	46%	Career total: 51%		
Year-end ranking	981	204	229	99	36	39	26	38	1146	293	50		$6,049,053		

== ATP 1000 tournaments finals ==
=== Singles: 1 (runner-up) ===
Result	Year	Tournament	Surface	Opponent	Score
Loss	2021	Canadian Open	Hard	(Russia) Daniil Medvedev	4–6, 3–6

== ATP Tour finals ==
=== Singles: 7 (4 titles, 3 runner-ups) ===
Legend Grand Slam (–) ATP 1000 (0–1) ATP 500 (–) ATP 250 (4–2)	Finals by surface Hard (3–3) Clay (1–0) Grass (–)	Finals by setting Outdoor (2–3) Indoor (2–0)

Result	W–L	Date	Tournament	Tier	Surface	Opponent	Score
Win	1–0	Feb 2019	New York Open, US	ATP 250	Hard (i)	(Canada) Brayden Schnur	6–1, 6–7^{(7–9)}, 7–6^{(9–7)}
Win	2–0	Feb 2020	Delray Beach Open, US	ATP 250	Hard	(Japan) Yoshihito Nishioka	7–5, 6–7^{(4–7)}, 6–2
Loss	2–1	Aug 2021	Canadian Open, Canada	ATP 1000	Hard	(Russia) Daniil Medvedev	4–6, 3–6
Win	3–1	Feb 2022	Dallas Open, US	ATP 250	Hard (i)	(United States) Jenson Brooksby	7–6^{(7–5)}, 7–6^{(7–3)}
Loss	3–2	Feb 2022	Delray Beach Open, US	ATP 250	Hard	(United Kingdom) Cameron Norrie	6–7^{(1–7)}, 6–7^{(4–7)}
Win	4–2	Apr 2022	U.S. Men's Clay Court Championships, US	ATP 250	Clay	(United States) John Isner	6–3, 7–6^{(9–7)}
Loss	4–3	Jan 2025	Brisbane International, Australia	ATP 250	Hard	(Czech Republic) Jiří Lehečka	1–4 ret.

=== Doubles: 4 (1 title, 3 runner-ups) ===
Legend Grand Slam (–) ATP 1000 (–) ATP 500 (0–2) ATP 250 (1–1)	Finals by surface Hard (1–2) Clay (–) Grass (0–1)	Finals by setting Outdoor (1–1) Indoor (0–2)

Result	W–L	Date	Tournament	Tier	Surface	Partner	Opponents	Score
Loss	0–1	Oct 2019	Swiss Indoors, Switzerland	ATP 500	Hard (i)	(United States) Taylor Fritz	(Netherlands) Jean-Julien Rojer (Romania) Horia Tecău	5–7, 3–6
Loss	0–2	Feb 2020	New York Open, US	ATP 250	Hard (i)	(United States) Steve Johnson	(United Kingdom) Dominic Inglot (Pakistan) Aisam-ul-Haq Qureshi	6–7^{(5–7)}, 6–7^{(6–8)}
Loss	0–3	Jun 2021	Queen's Club Championships, UK	ATP 500	Grass	(Australia) John Peers	(France) Pierre-Hugues Herbert (France) Nicolas Mahut	4–6, 5–7
Win	1–3	Jul 2021	Atlanta Open, US	ATP 250	Hard	(Italy) Jannik Sinner	(United States) Steve Johnson (Australia) Jordan Thompson	6–4, 6–7^{(6–8)}, [10–3]

== ATP Challenger and ITF Tour finals ==
=== Singles: 6 (4 titles, 2 runner-ups) ===
Legend ATP Challenger Tour (4–2) ITF Futures (–)	Finals by surface Hard (3–2) Clay (1–0)

Result	W–L	Date	Tournament	Tier	Surface	Opponent	Score
Win	1–0	Nov 2016	Charlottesville Men's Pro Challenger, US	Challenger	Hard (i)	(Belgium) Ruben Bemelmans	6–4, 2–6, 7–6^{(7–5)}
Win	2–0	May 2018	BNP Paribas Primrose Bordeaux, France	Challenger	Clay	(France) Grégoire Barrère	6–7^{(5–7)}, 6–4, 7–5
Loss	2–1	Sep 2018	Oracle Challenger Series – Chicago, US	Challenger	Hard	(Uzbekistan) Denis Istomin	4–6, 2–6
Loss	2–2	Sep 2018	Cary Challenger, US	Challenger	Hard	(Australia) James Duckworth	6–7^{(4–7)}, 3–6
Win	3–2	Nov 2018	Knoxville Challenger, US	Challenger	Hard (i)	(United States) Bjorn Fratangelo	7–5, 4–6, 7–6^{(7–2)}
Win	4–2	Nov 2018	Champaign–Urbana Challenger, US	Challenger	Hard (i)	(United States) Ryan Shane	7–6^{(8–6)}, 6–3

=== Doubles: 1 (runner-up) ===
Legend ATP Challenger Tour (–) ITF Futures (0–1)	Finals by surface Hard (0–1) Clay (–)

Result	W–L	Date	Tournament	Tier	Surface	Partner	Opponents	Score
Loss	0–1	Sep 2014	US F24, Claremont	Futures	Hard	(United States) Deiton Baughman	(United States) Dennis Nevolo (United States) Jeff Dadamo	2–5 ret.

== Junior Grand Slam finals ==
=== Singles: 1 (title) ===
Result	Year	Tournament	Surface	Opponent	Score
Win	2015	Wimbledon	Grass	(Sweden) Mikael Ymer	7–6^{(7–5)}, 6–4

=== Doubles: 1 (runner-up) ===
Result	Year	Tournament	Surface	Partner	Opponents	Score
Loss	2015	Wimbledon	Grass	(Japan) Akira Santillan	(India) Sumit Nagal (Vietnam) Lý Hoàng Nam	6–7^{(4–7)}, 4–6

== Wins over top 10 players ==
- Opelka has a 9–14 record against players who were, at the time the match was played, ranked in the top 10.

Season	2018	2019	2020	2021	2022	2023	2024	2025	Total
Wins	1	3	2	1	0	0	0	2	9

#	Player	Rank	Event	Surface	Rd	Score	ROR
2018
1.	(United States) Jack Sock	8	Delray Beach Open, US	Hard	2R	4–6, 7–5, 6–3	228
2019
2.	(United States) John Isner	10	Australian Open, Australia	Hard	1R	7–6^{(7–4)}, 7–6^{(8–6)}, 6–7^{(4–7)}, 7–6^{(7–5)}	97
3.	(United States) John Isner	9	New York Open, US	Hard (i)	SF	6–7^{(8–10)}, 7–6^{(16–14)}, 7–6^{(7–4)}	89
4.	(Spain) Roberto Bautista Agut	10	Swiss Indoors, Switzerland	Hard (i)	QF	6–3, 3–6, 6–3	37
2020
5.	(Italy) Matteo Berrettini	8	Cincinnati Open, US	Hard	3R	6–3, 7–6^{(7–4)}	39
6.	(Russia) Daniil Medvedev	6	St. Petersburg Open, Russia	Hard (i)	2R	2–6, 7–5, 6–4	36
2021
7.	(Greece) Stefanos Tsitsipas	3	Canadian Open, Canada	Hard	SF	6–7^{(2–7)}, 7–6^{(7–4)}, 6–4	32
2025
8.	(Serbia) Novak Djokovic	7	Brisbane International, Australia	Hard	QF	7–6^{(8–6)}, 6–3	293
9.	(Australia) Alex de Minaur	8	Cincinnati Open, US	Hard	2R	7–6^{(8–6)}, 6–4	73

* As of 10 August 2025.
