= Ryan Shane =

American tennis player

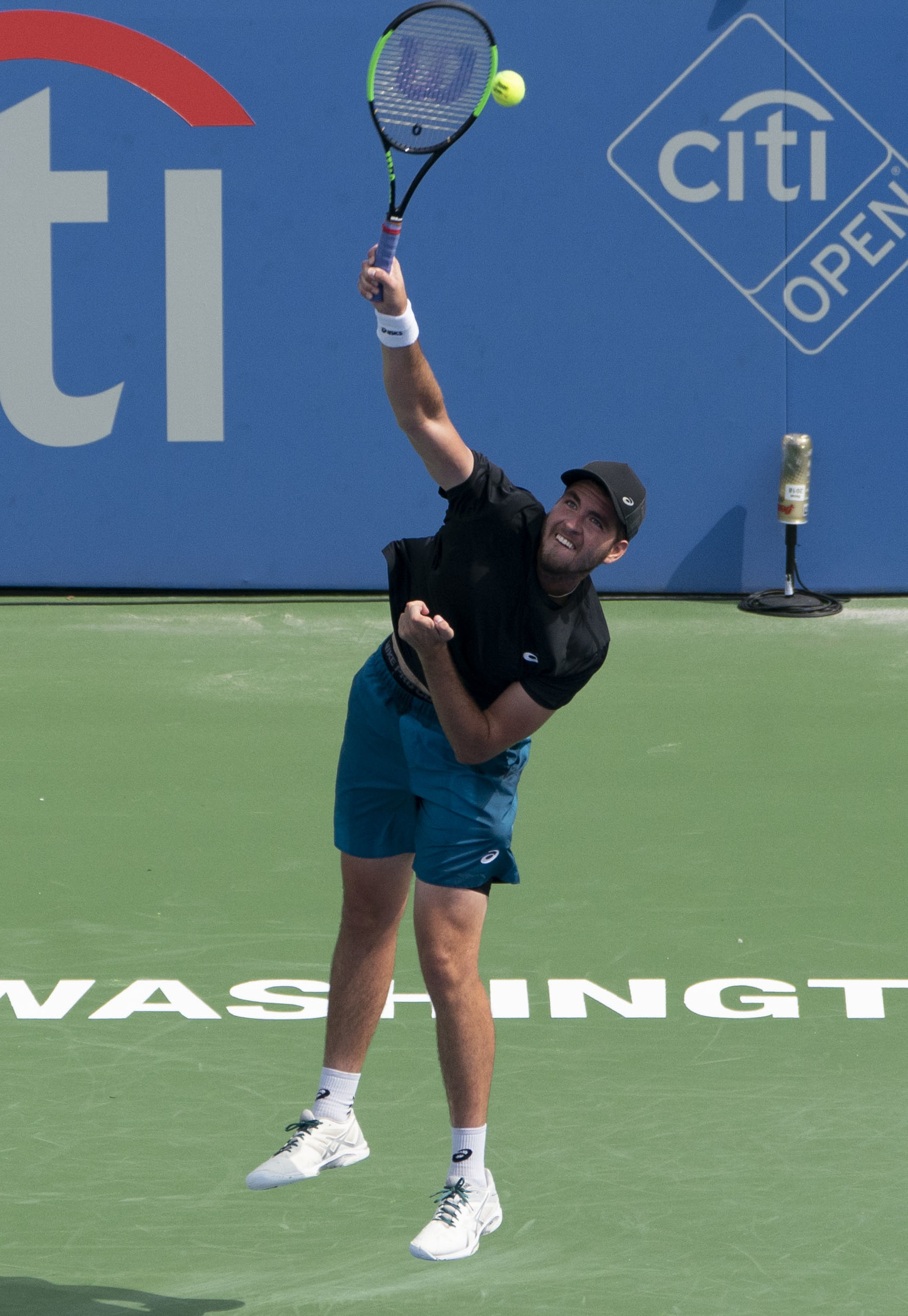
- Shane at the 2018 Citi Open
- Country (sports): United States
- Residence: Falls Church, Virginia
- Born: April 15, 1994 (age 31) Falls Church, Virginia
- Height: 6 ft 4 in (1.93 m)
- Turned pro: 2015
- Plays: Right-handed (one-handed backhand)
- College: University of Virginia
- Coach: Dustin Taylor
- Prize money: $113,972

Singles
- Career record: 0–1
- Career titles: 0
- Highest ranking: No. 333 (July 29, 2019)
- Current ranking: No. 691 (April 26, 2021)

Grand Slam singles results
- US Open: 1R (2015)

Doubles
- Career record: 0–0
- Career titles: 0
- Highest ranking: No. 604 (January 28, 2019)
- Last updated on: April 26, 2021.

Ryan John Shane (born April 15, 1994) is an American professional tennis player. He played college tennis at the University of Virginia. On May 25, 2015, Shane won the NCAA Men's Singles Championship. This victory also earned him a wild card into the main draw of the 2015 US Open.

== Early life ==
Ryan's parents are Alaine and Jack Shane. He has an older brother, Justin, who also played on the Virginia tennis team, and a younger brother named Zachary. In the summer months growing up Ryan's family would vacation to Franklin, New Hampshire; where there was a family tennis court that got good use from the Shane brothers. Ryan was part of a Fairfax, Virginia tennis club that also included future Virginia tennis players, Michael Shabaz and Treat Huey. Shane attended J. E. B. Stuart High School in Falls Church, Virginia and was a blue-chip recruit coming out of high school.

== College career ==
As a freshman, Shane was on a Virginia team that went undefeated and won the NCAA Championship. The championship was the first for both Virginia as well the ACC.

Following his sophomore season, Shane was named second-team All-ACC. He was also announced as the ITA Atlantic Region Player to Watch.

During his junior year, Shane helped lead Virginia to an NCAA Championship in the team tournament, playing at #1 singles and doubles. Six days later, Shane defeated Noah Rubin 3–6, 7–6 ^{(7–4)}, 6–1, to capture the NCAA Men's Singles title. He is the second Virginia player to win the singles tournament, after Somdev Devvarman did so in 2007 and 2008. Shane was named first-team All-ACC following a season where he posted a 27–8 record in singles.

== ATP Challenger and ITF Futures finals ==
=== Singles: 7 (4–3) ===
Legend (singles) ATP Challenger Tour (0–1) ITF Futures Tour (4–2)	Titles by surface Hard (4–3) Clay (0–0) Grass (0–0)

Result	W–L	Date	Tournament	Tier	Surface	Opponent	Score
Win	1–0	Sep 2015	USA F27, Costa Mesa	Futures	Hard	(United States) Ernesto Escobedo	6–4, 6–3
Loss	1–1	Dec 2015	USA F35, Tallahassee	Futures	Hard (i)	(United States) Daniel Nguyen	6–3, 3–6, 3–6
Win	2–1	Nov 2016	USA F39, Waco	Futures	Hard (i)	(United States) Jared Hiltzik	2–6, 7–6^{(9–7)}, 6–4
Win	3–1	Sep 2017	USA F31, Laguna Niguel	Futures	Hard	(United States) Henry Craig	6–3, 6–3
Loss	3–2	Sep 2017	USA F32, Fountain Valley	Futures	Hard	(United States) Ronnie Schneider	7–5, 2–6, 6–7^{(1–7)}
Win	4–2	Dec 2017	USA F40, Tallahassee	Futures	Hard (i)	(Japan) Kaichi Uchida	7–6^{(7–3)}, 6–1
Loss	4–3	Nov 2018	Champaign, USA	Challenger	Hard (i)	(United States) Reilly Opelka	6–7^{(6–8)}, 3–6

=== Doubles: 4 (3–1) ===
Legend (singles) ATP Challenger Tour (0–0) ITF Futures Tour (3–1)	Titles by surface Hard (3–1) Clay (0–0) Grass (0–0)

Result	W–L	Date	Tournament	Tier	Surface	Partner	Opponents	Score
Win	1–0	Aug 2015	USA F25, Champaign	Futures	Hard	(United States) Justin S. Shane	(United States) Evan King (United States) Kevin King	6–1, 7–6^{(7–4)}
Win	2–0	Sep 2017	USA F31, Laguna Niguel	Futures	Hard	(United States) Ronnie Schneider	(United States) Trevor Allen Johnson (United States) Patrick Kawka	7–5, 6–2
Win	3–0	Nov 2018	Portugal F20, Idanha-a-Nova	Futures	Hard	(United States) Justin Butsch	(Argentina) Franco Emanuel Egea (Austria) Peter Goldsteiner	6–3, 6–3
Loss	3–1	Sep 2021	M15 Champaign, USA	World Tennis Tour	Hard	(United States) Nathan Ponwith	(United States) Kweisi Kenyatte (Latvia) Kārlis Ozoliņš	5–7, 6–2, [7–10]
