= 2021 Potchefstroom Open II – Doubles =

Doubles
- 2021 Potchefstroom Open II

Final
- Champions: (South Africa) Raven Klaasen (South Africa) Ruan Roelofse
- Runners-up: (Belgium) Julien Cagnina (Czech Republic) Zdeněk Kolář
- Score: 6–4, 6–4

Events
Singles	Doubles
← 2021 ·	Potchefstroom Open	· 2022 →

This was the second of two editions of the tournament in the 2021 tennis season. Marc-Andrea Hüsler and Zdeněk Kolář were the defending champions but only Kolář chose to defend his title, partnering Julien Cagnina. Kolář lost in the final to Raven Klaasen and Ruan Roelofse.

Klaasen and Roelofse won the title after defeating Cagnina and Kolář 6–4, 6–4 in the final.

== Seeds ==
1. (South Africa) Raven Klaasen / (South Africa) Ruan Roelofse (champions)
2. (France) Benjamin Bonzi / (France) Tristan Lamasine (quarterfinals, withdrew)
3. (Russia) Teymuraz Gabashvili / (Netherlands) Mark Vervoort (semifinals)
4. (Canada) Peter Polansky / (Canada) Brayden Schnur (first round, withdrew)

== Draw ==
=== Key ===
- Q = Qualifier
- WC = Wild card
- LL = Lucky loser
- Alt = Alternate
- SE = Special exempt
- PR = Protected ranking
- ITF = ITF entry
- JE = Junior exempt
- w/o = Walkover
- r = Retired
- d = Defaulted
- SR = Special ranking

First round
(Czech Republic) V Kopřiva (Czech Republic) V Šafránek	6	6
(Serbia) Milan Radojković (Russia) Yan Sabanin	1	2
3	(Russia) T Gabashvili (Netherlands) M Vervoort	7	5	[10]
(India) A Kadhe (Zimbabwe) B Lock	5	7	[7]
WC	(South Africa) Devin Badenhorst (South Africa) Luc Koenig	1	2
(Norway) V Durasovic (Germany) B Hassan	6	6
WC	(South Africa) Vasilios Caripi (South Africa) Vaughn Hunter	4
(Serbia) P Krstin (Chinese Taipei) C-h Tseng	0^{r}
WC	(South Africa) Robbie Arends (South Africa) Khololwam Montsi	w/o
4	(Canada) P Polansky (Canada) B Schnur
(Spain) A Menéndez Maceiras (Austria) L Miedler	5	6	[9]
PR	(Belgium) J Cagnina (Czech Republic) Z Kolář	7	4	[11]
(France) G Blancaneaux (United Kingdom) J Clarke	2	3
2	(France) B Bonzi (France) T Lamasine	6	6

Quarterfinals
1	(South Africa) R Klaasen (South Africa) R Roelofse	7^{8}	4	[10]
(Czech Republic) V Kopřiva (Czech Republic) V Šafránek	6^{6}	6	[4]
3	(Russia) T Gabashvili (Netherlands) M Vervoort	w/o
(Norway) V Durasovic (Germany) B Hassan
WC	(South Africa) V Caripi (South Africa) V Hunter	6	6
WC	(South Africa) R Arends (South Africa) K Montsi	4	3
PR	(Belgium) J Cagnina (Czech Republic) Z Kolář	w/o
2	(France) B Bonzi (France) T Lamasine

Semifinals
1	(South Africa) R Klaasen (South Africa) R Roelofse	6	4	[12]
3	(Russia) T Gabashvili (Netherlands) M Vervoort	3	6	[10]
WC	(South Africa) V Caripi (South Africa) V Hunter	4	2
PR	(Belgium) J Cagnina (Czech Republic) Z Kolář	6	6

Final
1	(South Africa) R Klaasen (South Africa) R Roelofse	6	6
PR	(Belgium) J Cagnina (Czech Republic) Z Kolář	4	4
