= 2021 Potchefstroom Open II – Singles =

Singles
- 2021 Potchefstroom Open II

Final
- Champion: (United States) Jenson Brooksby
- Runner-up: (Russia) Teymuraz Gabashvili
- Score: 2–6, 6–3, 6–0

Events
Singles	Doubles
← 2021 ·	Potchefstroom Open	· 2022 →

This was the second of two editions of the tournament in the 2021 tennis season. Benjamin Bonzi was the defending champion but lost in the second round to Jenson Brooksby.

Brooksby won the title after defeating Teymuraz Gabashvili 2–6, 6–3, 6–0 in the final.

== Seeds ==
1. (India) Prajnesh Gunneswaran (first round)
2. (France) Benjamin Bonzi (second round)
3. (Switzerland) Marc-Andrea Hüsler (second round)
4. (United Kingdom) Liam Broady (semifinals)
5. (United Kingdom) Jay Clarke (first round)
6. (Canada) Brayden Schnur (first round)
7. (Turkey) Cem İlkel (quarterfinals)
8. (Canada) Peter Polansky (first round)

== Draw ==
=== Key ===
- Q = Qualifier
- WC = Wild card
- LL = Lucky loser
- Alt = Alternate
- SE = Special exempt
- PR = Protected ranking
- ITF = ITF entry
- JE = Junior exempt
- w/o = Walkover
- r = Retired
- d = Defaulted
- SR = Special ranking

=== Finals ===
Semifinals
(Russia) Teymuraz Gabashvili	1	6	6
4	(United Kingdom) Liam Broady	6	4	4
Q	(Austria) Lucas Miedler	5	2
PR	(United States) Jenson Brooksby	7	6

Final
(Russia) Teymuraz Gabashvili	6	3	0
PR	(United States) Jenson Brooksby	2	6	6

=== Top half ===
First round
1	(India) P Gunneswaran	3	6	5
(Australia) A Santillan	6	3	7
(Spain) N Kuhn	6	6
(Morocco) E Benchetrit	3	4
(Russia) T Gabashvili	2	6	6
WC	(South Africa) Alec Beckley	6	1	1
(United States) U Blanch	7^{7}	6
8	(Canada) P Polansky	6^{4}	3
4	(United Kingdom) L Broady	6	6
(Croatia) V Galović	3	1
Alt	(Czech Republic) V Kopřiva	1	1
(France) G Blancaneaux	6	6
(Spain) A Menéndez Maceiras	6	6
(Czech Republic) Z Kolář	4	0
WC	(South Africa) Khololwam Montsi	6	6
6	(Canada) B Schnur	4	1

Second round
(Australia) A Santillan	6	3	6
(Spain) N Kuhn	4	6	4
(Russia) T Gabashvili	6	1	6
(United States) U Blanch	4	6	3
4	(United Kingdom) L Broady	6	6
(France) G Blancaneaux	3	0
(Spain) A Menéndez Maceiras	6	6
WC	(South Africa) K Montsi	3	0

Quarterfinals
(Australia) A Santillan	6^{5}	6	3
(Russia) T Gabashvili	7^{7}	4	6
4	(United Kingdom) L Broady	4	6	6
(Spain) A Menéndez Maceiras	6	3	1

Semifinals
(Russia) T Gabashvili	1	6	6
4	(United Kingdom) L Broady	6	4	4

=== Bottom half ===
First round
5	(United Kingdom) J Clarke	7	3	6^{2}
(Bulgaria) D Kuzmanov	5	6	7^{7}
(Ecuador) R Quiroz	5	5
(France) T Lamasine	7	7
Q	(Austria) L Miedler	6	6
(Serbia) P Krstin	2	0
WC	(South Africa) Vaughn Hunter	3	2
3	(Switzerland) M-A Hüsler	6	6
7	(Turkey) C İlkel	6	7^{7}
PR	(Belgium) J Cagnina	1	6^{1}
(Chinese Taipei) C-h Tseng	6	3	6
Q	(Bosnia and Herzegovina) M Bašić	4	6	3
Q	(United Kingdom) R Peniston	7^{9}	2	2
PR	(United States) J Brooksby	6^{7}	6	6
Q	(United Kingdom) J Draper	1	2
2	(France) B Bonzi	6	6

Second round
(Bulgaria) D Kuzmanov	7	7^{7}
(France) T Lamasine	5	6^{5}
Q	(Austria) L Miedler	4	6	6
3	(Switzerland) M-A Hüsler	6	3	4
7	(Turkey) C İlkel	7^{7}	7
(Chinese Taipei) C-h Tseng	6^{3}	5
PR	(United States) J Brooksby	6	5	6
2	(France) B Bonzi	3	7	3

Quarterfinals
(Bulgaria) D Kuzmanov	7	2	2
Q	(Austria) L Miedler	5	6	6
7	(Turkey) C İlkel	1	4
PR	(United States) J Brooksby	6	6

Semifinals
Q	(Austria) L Miedler	5	2
PR	(United States) J Brooksby	7	6
