= 2021 Potchefstroom Open – Singles =

Singles
- 2021 Potchefstroom Open

Final
- Champion: (France) Benjamin Bonzi
- Runner-up: (United Kingdom) Liam Broady
- Score: 7–5, 6–4

Events
Singles	Doubles
← 2020 ·	Potchefstroom Open	· 2021 →

This was the second edition of the tournament. There was no defending champion as the tournament was canceled at the quarterfinals stage due to the COVID-19 pandemic.

Benjamin Bonzi won the title after defeating Liam Broady 7–5, 6–4 in the final.

== Seeds ==
1. (India) Prajnesh Gunneswaran (first round)
2. (France) Benjamin Bonzi (champion)
3. (Switzerland) Marc-Andrea Hüsler (first round)
4. (United Kingdom) Jay Clarke (first round)
5. (Canada) Brayden Schnur (first round)
6. (Turkey) Cem İlkel (semifinals)
7. (Canada) Peter Polansky (quarterfinals)
8. (Dominican Republic) Roberto Cid Subervi (first round)

== Draw ==
=== Key ===
- Q = Qualifier
- WC = Wild card
- LL = Lucky loser
- Alt = Alternate
- SE = Special exempt
- PR = Protected ranking
- ITF = ITF entry
- JE = Junior exempt
- w/o = Walkover
- r = Retired
- d = Defaulted
- SR = Special ranking

=== Finals ===
Semifinals
6	(Turkey) Cem İlkel	6^{3}	4
Q	(United Kingdom) Liam Broady	7^{7}	6
Q	(United States) Nick Chappell	1	2
2	(France) Benjamin Bonzi	6	6

Final
Q	(United Kingdom) Liam Broady	5	4
2	(France) Benjamin Bonzi	7	6

=== Top half ===
First round
1	(India) P Gunneswaran	3	4
(Bulgaria) D Kuzmanov	6	6
Q	(United Kingdom) R Peniston	6	4	4
(Morocco) E Benchetrit	4	6	6
WC	(South Africa) Khololwam Montsi	3	1
PR	(Belgium) J Cagnina	6	6
PR	(United States) J Brooksby	3	4
6	(Turkey) C İlkel	6	6
4	(United Kingdom) J Clarke	6^{5}	4
(United States) U Blanch	7^{7}	6
(Chinese Taipei) C-h Tseng	6	4	6
(Australia) A Santillan	1	6	3
(Spain) A Menéndez Maceiras	6	6
(Russia) T Gabashvili	4	4
Q	(United Kingdom) L Broady	6	6
5	(Canada) B Schnur	4	3

Second round
(Bulgaria) D Kuzmanov	6	7
(Morocco) E Benchetrit	2	5
PR	(Belgium) J Cagnina	2	3
6	(Turkey) C İlkel	6	6
(United States) U Blanch	7^{7}	3	0^{r}
(Chinese Taipei) C-h Tseng	6^{2}	6	2
(Spain) A Menéndez Maceiras	4	6^{3}
Q	(United Kingdom) L Broady	6	7^{7}

Quarterfinals
(Bulgaria) D Kuzmanov	6	3	2
6	(Turkey) C İlkel	4	6	6
(Chinese Taipei) C-h Tseng	3	3
Q	(United Kingdom) L Broady	6	6

Semifinals
6	(Turkey) C İlkel	6^{3}	4
Q	(United Kingdom) L Broady	7^{7}	6

=== Bottom half ===
First round
7	(Canada) P Polansky	6	3	7^{7}
(Croatia) V Galović	2	6	6^{2}
(France) T Lamasine	7^{7}	1	6
WC	(South Africa) Vaughn Hunter	6^{1}	6	1
Q	(United States) N Chappell	6	2	7^{7}
(Spain) N Kuhn	1	6	6^{3}
(France) H Grenier	7^{7}	7
3	(Switzerland) M-A Hüsler	6^{5}	5
8	(Dominican Republic) R Cid Subervi	3	5
(Serbia) P Krstin	6	7
Q	(Bosnia and Herzegovina) M Bašić	7^{7}	7
(Czech Republic) Z Kolář	6^{4}	5
WC	(South Africa) Robbie Arends	2	2
(Ecuador) R Quiroz	6	6
(France) G Blancaneaux	2	4
2	(France) B Bonzi	6	6

Second round
7	(Canada) P Polansky	6	6
(France) T Lamasine	4	4
Q	(United States) N Chappell	6	6
(France) H Grenier	2	4
(Serbia) P Krstin	1^{r}
Q	(Bosnia and Herzegovina) M Bašić	4
(Ecuador) R Quiroz	6	4	3
2	(France) B Bonzi	3	6	6

Quarterfinals
7	(Canada) P Polansky	4	7^{7}	4
Q	(United States) N Chappell	6	6^{3}	6
Q	(Bosnia and Herzegovina) M Bašić	3	1
2	(France) B Bonzi	6	6

Semifinals
Q	(United States) N Chappell	1	2
2	(France) B Bonzi	6	6
