= 2019 New York Open =

- Date: 11–17 February 2019
- Edition: 2nd
- Category: ATP Tour 250 series
- Draw: 28S/16D
- Surface: Hard / Indoors
- Location: Uniondale, New York, United States
- Venue: Nassau Coliseum

Champions

Singles
- (United States) Reilly Opelka

Doubles
- (Germany) Kevin Krawietz / (Germany) Andreas Mies
← 2018 ·	New York Open	· 2020 →

The 2019 New York Open was a men's tennis tournament played on indoor hard courts. It was the second edition of the New York Open, and part of the ATP Tour 250 series of the 2019 ATP Tour. It took place in Uniondale, New York, United States, at the Nassau Veterans Memorial Coliseum from February 11 through 17, 2019.

== Singles main-draw entrants ==
=== Seeds ===
Country	Player	Rank^{1}	Seed
USA	John Isner	9	1
USA	Frances Tiafoe	30	2
USA	Steve Johnson	34	3
AUS	John Millman	36	4
FRA	Adrian Mannarino	46	5
USA	Sam Querrey	48	6
AUS	Jordan Thompson	60	7
USA	Tennys Sandgren	75	8

- ^{1} Rankings are as of February 4, 2019.

=== Other entrants ===
The following players received wildcards into the singles main draw:

- (Canada) Jack Mingjie Lin
- (United States) Noah Rubin
- (United States) Frances Tiafoe

The following players received entry from the qualifying draw:

- (United States) Christopher Eubanks
- (Spain) Adrián Menéndez Maceiras
- (India) Ramkumar Ramanathan
- (Canada) Brayden Schnur

The following player received entry as a lucky loser:

- (Australia) Alexei Popyrin

=== Withdrawals ===
Before the tournament

- (South Africa) Kevin Anderson → replaced by (Canada) Peter Polansky
- (Australia) Alex de Minaur → replaced by (Slovakia) Lukáš Lacko
- (United States) Bradley Klahn → replaced by (Australia) Alexei Popyrin
- (Spain) Feliciano López → replaced by (Spain) Guillermo García López
- (United States) Michael Mmoh → replaced by (Italy) Paolo Lorenzi

=== Retirements ===
- (Uzbekistan) Denis Istomin

== Doubles main-draw entrants ==
=== Seeds ===
Country	Player	Country	Player	Rank^{1}	Seed
USA	Bob Bryan	USA	Mike Bryan	17	1
GBR	Ken Skupski	GBR	Neal Skupski	85	2
GBR	Luke Bambridge	GBR	Jonny O'Mara	105	3
SWE	Robert Lindstedt	GER	Tim Pütz	123	4

- ^{1} Rankings are as of February 4, 2019.

=== Other entrants ===
The following pairs received wildcards into the doubles main draw:

- (United States) Brendan Evans / (United States) John Isner
- (Australia) Lleyton Hewitt / (Australia) Alexei Popyrin

The following pairs received entry as alternates:

- (Italy) Paolo Lorenzi / (Canada) Peter Polansky
- (United States) Tennys Sandgren / (United States) Jackson Withrow

=== Withdrawals ===
Before the tournament

- (United States) Bradley Klahn

== Champions ==
=== Singles ===
- (United States) Reilly Opelka def. (Canada) Brayden Schnur, 6–1, 6–7^{(7–9)}, 7–6^{(9–7)}

=== Doubles ===
- (Germany) Kevin Krawietz / (Germany) Andreas Mies def. (Mexico) Santiago González / (Pakistan) Aisam-ul-Haq Qureshi, 6–4, 7–5
