= 2020 New York Open – Singles =

Singles
- 2020 New York Open

Final
- Champion: (United Kingdom) Kyle Edmund
- Runner-up: (Italy) Andreas Seppi
- Score: 7–5, 6–1

Details
- Draw: 28 (4 Q / 3 WC )
- Seeds: 8

Events
Singles	Doubles
← 2019 ·	New York Open (tennis)

Reilly Opelka was the defending champion, but lost to Jason Jung in the quarterfinals.

Kyle Edmund won the title, defeating Andreas Seppi in the final, 7–5, 6–1.

== Seeds ==
The top four seeds received a bye into the second round.

1. (United States) John Isner (second round)
2. (Canada) Milos Raonic (second round)
3. (United States) Reilly Opelka (quarterfinals)
4. (France) Ugo Humbert (quarterfinals)
5. (United States) Tennys Sandgren (first round)
6. (Serbia) Miomir Kecmanović (semifinals)
7. (United Kingdom) Cameron Norrie (second round)
8. (United Kingdom) Kyle Edmund (champion)

== Draw ==
=== Key ===
- Q = Qualifier
- WC = Wild card
- LL = Lucky loser
- Alt = Alternate
- ITF = ITF entry
- PR = Protected ranking
- SR = Special ranking
- SE = Special exempt
- JE = Junior exempt
- JR = Junior Accelerator Programme entrant
- CO = College Accelerator Programme entrant
- NG = Next Gen Accelerator Program entrant
- w/o = Walkover
- r = Retired
- d = Defaulted

=== Finals ===
Semifinals
(Italy) Andreas Seppi	6	6
Q	(Chinese Taipei) Jason Jung	3	2
6	(Serbia) Miomir Kecmanović	1	4
8	(United Kingdom) Kyle Edmund	6	6

Final
(Italy) Andreas Seppi	5	1
8	(United Kingdom) Kyle Edmund	7	6

=== Top half ===
First round
(Croatia) I Karlović	3	6^{2}
(Australia) J Thompson	6	7^{7}
(Bosnia and Herzegovina) D Džumhur	3	6	6^{6}
(Italy) A Seppi	6	1	7^{8}
(United States) S Johnson	6^{5}	6	7^{7}
5	(United States) T Sandgren	7^{7}	3	6^{3}
(Japan) Y Nishioka	6	0	6
(Switzerland) H Laaksonen	3	6	2
Q	(Chinese Taipei) J Jung	7^{8}	6
(South Africa) K Anderson	6^{6}	4
WC	(United States) B Shi	5	3
7	(United Kingdom) C Norrie	7	6

Second round
1	(United States) J Isner	6^{2}	7^{7}	3
(Australia) J Thompson	7^{7}	6^{3}	6
(Italy) A Seppi	7^{7}	6
(United States) S Johnson	6^{4}	3
3	(United States) R Opelka	6	6
(Japan) Y Nishioka	4	4
Q	(Chinese Taipei) J Jung	6	6
7	(United Kingdom) C Norrie	4	4

Quarterfinals
(Australia) J Thompson	7^{7}	4	1
(Italy) A Seppi	6^{2}	6	6
3	(United States) R Opelka	7	4	4
Q	(Chinese Taipei) J Jung	5	6	6

Semifinals
(Italy) A Seppi	6	6
Q	(Chinese Taipei) J Jung	3	2

=== Bottom half ===
First round
6	(Serbia) M Kecmanović	6	6
(United States) T Paul	4	2
Q	(Italy) P Lorenzi	4	6	6
Q	(Serbia) D Petrović	6	4	0
WC	(United States) J Sock	3	4
(United States) M Giron	6	6
8	(United Kingdom) K Edmund	7	6
(Japan) Y Uchiyama	5	4
WC	(Canada) B Schnur	4	3
(Germany) D Koepfer	6	6
Q	(Japan) G Soeda	2	7^{7}	3
(South Korea) S-w Kwon	6	6^{2}	6

Second round
6	(Serbia) M Kecmanović	6	6
Q	(Italy) P Lorenzi	3	3
(United States) M Giron	1	0
4	(France) U Humbert	6	6
8	(United Kingdom) K Edmund	6	6
(Germany) D Koepfer	2	4
(South Korea) S-w Kwon	7^{7}	6^{4}	6
2	(Canada) M Raonic	6^{4}	7^{7}	4

Quarterfinals
6	(Serbia) M Kecmanović	3	6	6
4	(France) U Humbert	6	2	4
8	(United Kingdom) K Edmund	3	6	7^{7}
(South Korea) S-w Kwon	6	2	6^{5}

Semifinals
6	(Serbia) M Kecmanović	1	4
8	(United Kingdom) K Edmund	6	6

== Qualifying ==
=== Seeds ===
1. (Japan) Go Soeda (qualified)
2. (Italy) Paolo Lorenzi (qualified)
3. (United States) Bradley Klahn (qualifying competition)
4. (Chinese Taipei) Jason Jung (qualified)
5. (United States) Mackenzie McDonald (first round)
6. (Israel) Dudi Sela (first round)
7. (Serbia) Danilo Petrović (qualified)
8. (Uzbekistan) Denis Istomin (first round)

=== Qualifiers ===
1. (Japan) Go Soeda
2. (Italy) Paolo Lorenzi
3. (Serbia) Danilo Petrović
4. (Chinese Taipei) Jason Jung

=== Qualifying draw ===
==== First qualifier ====
First round
1	(Japan) Go Soeda	6	6
Alt	(Denmark) Frederik Nielsen	1	2
(Australia) Bernard Tomic	7^{7}	4	7^{7}
8	(Uzbekistan) Denis Istomin	6^{5}	6	6^{5}

Qualifying competition
1	(Japan) Go Soeda	6	6
(Australia) Bernard Tomic	2	1

==== Second qualifier ====
First round
2	(Italy) Paolo Lorenzi	7	6
(Spain) Guillermo García López	5	3
WC	(United States) Noah Rubin	6	7
5	(United States) Mackenzie McDonald	4	5

Qualifying competition
2	(Italy) Paolo Lorenzi	6	6
WC	(United States) Noah Rubin	3	1

==== Third qualifier ====
First round
3	(United States) Bradley Klahn	4	6	7^{7}
Alt	(El Salvador) Marcelo Arévalo	6	3	6^{3}
(Canada) Peter Polansky	0	0^{r}
7	(Serbia) Danilo Petrović	6	3

Qualifying competition
3	(United States) Bradley Klahn	3	2
7	(Serbia) Danilo Petrović	6	6

==== Fourth qualifier ====
First round
4	(Chinese Taipei) Jason Jung	6	6
WC	(United States) Gary Kushnirovich	3	2
(United States) Mitchell Krueger	3	6	6
6	(Israel) Dudi Sela	6	3	2

Qualifying competition
4	(Chinese Taipei) Jason Jung	6	6
(United States) Mitchell Krueger	2	4
