= 2020 New York Open – Doubles =

Doubles
- 2020 New York Open

Final
- Champions: (United Kingdom) Dominic Inglot (Pakistan) Aisam-ul-Haq Qureshi
- Runners-up: (United States) Steve Johnson (United States) Reilly Opelka
- Score: 7–6^{(7–5)}, 7–6^{(8–6)}

Events
Singles	Doubles
← 2019 ·	New York Open (tennis)

Kevin Krawietz and Andreas Mies were the defending champions for the tournament but chose to compete in Rotterdam instead of defending their title.

Dominic Inglot and Aisam-ul-Haq Qureshi won the title, defeating Steve Johnson and Reilly Opelka in the final, 7–6^{(7–5)}, 7–6^{(8–6)}.

== Seeds ==
1. (United States) Austin Krajicek / (Croatia) Franko Škugor (first round)
2. (Mexico) Santiago González / (United Kingdom) Ken Skupski (first round)
3. (New Zealand) Marcus Daniell / (Austria) Philipp Oswald (first round)
4. (United Kingdom) Luke Bambridge / (Japan) Ben McLachlan (first round)

== Draw ==
=== Key ===
- Q = Qualifier
- WC = Wild card
- LL = Lucky loser
- Alt = Alternate
- ITF = ITF entry
- PR = Protected ranking
- SR = Special ranking
- SE = Special exempt
- JE = Junior exempt
- JR = Junior Accelerator Programme entrant
- CO = College Accelerator Programme entrant
- NG = Next Gen Accelerator Program entrant
- w/o = Walkover
- r = Retired
- d = Defaulted

=== Draw ===
First round
1	(United States) A Krajicek (Croatia) F Škugor	6^{3}	3
(India) D Sharan (New Zealand) A Sitak	7^{7}	6
(France) U Humbert (United States) J Withrow	4	6	[8]
(United States) S Johnson (United States) R Opelka	6	2	[10]
3	(New Zealand) M Daniell (Austria) P Oswald	3	6	[8]
(El Salvador) M Arévalo (United Kingdom) J O'Mara	6	4	[10]
(Sweden) R Lindstedt (United States) T Sandgren	6	6
WC	(United States) S Jackson (Russia) O Kovalenko	1	0
(Serbia) M Kecmanović (Croatia) A Pavić	7	5	[6]
(Serbia) N Ćaćić (Monaco) H Nys	5	7	[10]
PR	(United States) N Monroe (United States) J Sock	7^{7}	7
4	(United Kingdom) L Bambridge (Japan) B McLachlan	6^{4}	5
WC	(United States) J Isner (United States) T Paul	4	6^{3}
(United Kingdom) D Inglot (Pakistan) A-u-H Qureshi	6	7^{7}
(Czech Republic) R Jebavý (Denmark) F Nielsen	6	6
2	(Mexico) S González (United Kingdom) K Skupski	4	4

Quarterfinals
(India) D Sharan (New Zealand) A Sitak	3	4
(United States) S Johnson (United States) R Opelka	6	6
(El Salvador) M Arévalo (United Kingdom) J O'Mara	6	6^{6}	[10]
(Sweden) R Lindstedt (United States) T Sandgren	4	7^{8}	[6]
(Serbia) N Ćaćić (Monaco) H Nys	3	4
PR	(United States) N Monroe (United States) J Sock	6	6
(United Kingdom) D Inglot (Pakistan) A-u-H Qureshi	4	6	[10]
(Czech Republic) R Jebavý (Denmark) F Nielsen	6	1	[5]

Semifinals
(United States) S Johnson (United States) R Opelka	7^{7}	6
(El Salvador) M Arévalo (United Kingdom) J O'Mara	6^{3}	4
PR	(United States) N Monroe (United States) J Sock	6	6^{3}	[3]
(United Kingdom) D Inglot (Pakistan) A-u-H Qureshi	4	7^{7}	[10]

Final
(United States) S Johnson (United States) R Opelka	6^{5}	6^{6}
(United Kingdom) D Inglot (Pakistan) A-u-H Qureshi	7^{7}	7^{8}
