= 2021 Potchefstroom Open – Doubles =

Doubles
- 2021 Potchefstroom Open

Final
- Champions: (Switzerland) Marc-Andrea Hüsler (Czech Republic) Zdeněk Kolář
- Runners-up: (Canada) Peter Polansky (Canada) Brayden Schnur
- Score: 6–4, 2–6, [10–4]

Events
Singles	Doubles
← 2020 ·	Potchefstroom Open	· 2021 →

This was the second edition of the tournament. There was no defending champion as the tournament was canceled at the quarterfinals stage due to the COVID-19 pandemic.

Marc-Andrea Hüsler and Zdeněk Kolář won the title after defeating Peter Polansky and Brayden Schnur 6–4, 2–6, [10–4] in the final.

== Seeds ==
1. (South Africa) Raven Klaasen / (South Africa) Ruan Roelofse (semifinals)
2. (Switzerland) Marc-Andrea Hüsler / (Czech Republic) Zdeněk Kolář (champions)
3. (France) Benjamin Bonzi / (France) Tristan Lamasine (first round)
4. (Russia) Teymuraz Gabashvili / (Netherlands) Mark Vervoort (first round)

== Draw ==
=== Key ===
- Q = Qualifier
- WC = Wild card
- LL = Lucky loser
- Alt = Alternate
- SE = Special exempt
- PR = Protected ranking
- ITF = ITF entry
- JE = Junior exempt
- w/o = Walkover
- r = Retired
- d = Defaulted
- SR = Special ranking

First round
1	(South Africa) R Klaasen (South Africa) R Roelofse	6	6
WC	(South Africa) Vasilios Caripi (South Africa) Vaughn Hunter	3	2
PR	(Belgium) J Cagnina (Spain) N Kuhn	6	6
WC	(South Africa) Devin Badenhorst (South Africa) Pierre Malan	3	4
4	(Russia) T Gabashvili (Netherlands) M Vervoort	3	6^{4}
(Canada) P Polansky (Canada) B Schnur	6	7^{7}
(Bulgaria) D Kuzmanov (Ecuador) R Quiroz	6	6
WC	(South Africa) Robbie Arends (South Africa) Khololwam Montsi	3	2
(United Kingdom) L Broady (United Kingdom) J Draper	7^{7}	7
(Zimbabwe) B Lock (Australia) A Santillan	6^{5}	5
(Dominican Republic) R Cid Subervi (India) A Kadhe	4	6	[10]
3	(France) B Bonzi (France) T Lamasine	6	4	[4]
(France) G Blancaneaux (Turkey) C İlkel	4	4
(Spain) A Menéndez Maceiras (Austria) L Miedler	6	6
Alt	(Netherlands) J de Jong (Czech Republic) V Kopřiva	3	4
2	(Switzerland) M-A Hüsler (Czech Republic) Z Kolář	6	6

Quarterfinals
1	(South Africa) R Klaasen (South Africa) R Roelofse	6	7
PR	(Belgium) J Cagnina (Spain) N Kuhn	1	5
(Canada) P Polansky (Canada) B Schnur	7^{8}	3	[10]
(Bulgaria) D Kuzmanov (Ecuador) R Quiroz	6^{6}	6	[8]
(United Kingdom) L Broady (United Kingdom) J Draper	3	6	[10]
(Dominican Republic) R Cid Subervi (India) A Kadhe	6	4	[6]
(Spain) A Menéndez Maceiras (Austria) L Miedler	6^{3}	6	[7]
2	(Switzerland) M-A Hüsler (Czech Republic) Z Kolář	7^{7}	3	[10]

Semifinals
1	(South Africa) R Klaasen (South Africa) R Roelofse	3	4
(Canada) P Polansky (Canada) B Schnur	6	6
(United Kingdom) L Broady (United Kingdom) J Draper	6^{4}	3
2	(Switzerland) M-A Hüsler (Czech Republic) Z Kolář	7^{7}	6

Final
(Canada) P Polansky (Canada) B Schnur	4	6	[4]
2	(Switzerland) M-A Hüsler (Czech Republic) Z Kolář	6	2	[10]
