= 2021 Potchefstroom Open =

- Date: 8–14 February
- Edition: 2nd
- Surface: Hard
- Location: Potchefstroom, South Africa

Champions

Singles
- (France) Benjamin Bonzi

Doubles
- (Switzerland) Marc-Andrea Hüsler / (Czech Republic) Zdeněk Kolář
← 2020 ·	Potchefstroom Open	· 2021 →

The 2021 Potchefstroom Open was a professional tennis tournament played on hard courts. It was the second edition of the tournament which was part of the 2021 ATP Challenger Tour. It took place in Potchefstroom, South Africa between 8 and 14 February 2021.

== Singles main-draw entrants ==
=== Seeds ===
Country	Player	Rank^{1}	Seed
IND	Prajnesh Gunneswaran	130	1
FRA	Benjamin Bonzi	134	2
SUI	Marc-Andrea Hüsler	143	3
GBR	Jay Clarke	190	4
CAN	Brayden Schnur	208	5
TUR	Cem İlkel	214	6
CAN	Peter Polansky	220	7
DOM	Roberto Cid Subervi	222	8

- ^{1} Rankings are as of 1 February 2021.

=== Other entrants ===
The following players received wildcards into the singles main draw:

- (South Africa) Robbie Arends
- (South Africa) Vaughn Hunter
- (South Africa) Khololwam Montsi

The following players received entry into the singles main draw using protected rankings:

- (United States) Jenson Brooksby
- (Belgium) Julien Cagnina

The following players received entry from the qualifying draw:

- (Bosnia and Herzegovina) Mirza Bašić
- (United Kingdom) Liam Broady
- (United States) Nick Chappell
- (United Kingdom) Ryan Peniston

== Champions ==
=== Singles ===
- (France) Benjamin Bonzi def. (United Kingdom) Liam Broady 7–5, 6–4.

=== Doubles ===
- (Switzerland) Marc-Andrea Hüsler / (Czech Republic) Zdeněk Kolář def. (Canada) Peter Polansky / (Canada) Brayden Schnur 6–4, 2–6, [10–4].
