= 2021 Potchefstroom Open II =

- Date: 15–21 February
- Edition: 3rd
- Surface: Hard
- Location: Potchefstroom, South Africa

Champions

Singles
- (United States) Jenson Brooksby

Doubles
- (South Africa) Raven Klaasen / (South Africa) Ruan Roelofse
← 2021 ·	Potchefstroom Open	· 2022 →

The 2021 Potchefstroom Open II was a professional tennis tournament played on hard courts. It was the third edition of the tournament which was part of the 2021 ATP Challenger Tour. It took place in Potchefstroom, South Africa between 15 and 21 February 2021.

== Singles main-draw entrants ==
=== Seeds ===
Country	Player	Rank^{1}	Seed
IND	Prajnesh Gunneswaran	131	1
FRA	Benjamin Bonzi	137	2
SUI	Marc-Andrea Hüsler	148	3
GBR	Liam Broady	191	4
GBR	Jay Clarke	193	5
CAN	Brayden Schnur	209	6
TUR	Cem İlkel	214	7
CAN	Peter Polansky	220	8

- ^{1} Rankings are as of 8 February 2021.

=== Other entrants ===
The following players received wildcards into the singles main draw:

- (South Africa) Alec Beckley
- (South Africa) Vaughn Hunter
- (South Africa) Khololwam Montsi

The following players received entry into the singles main draw using protected rankings:

- (United States) Jenson Brooksby
- (Belgium) Julien Cagnina

The following player received entry into the singles main draw as an alternate:

- (Czech Republic) Vít Kopřiva

The following players received entry from the qualifying draw:

- (Bosnia and Herzegovina) Mirza Bašić
- (United Kingdom) Jack Draper
- (Austria) Lucas Miedler
- (United Kingdom) Ryan Peniston

== Champions ==
=== Singles ===
- (United States) Jenson Brooksby def. (Russia) Teymuraz Gabashvili 2–6, 6–3, 6–0.

=== Doubles ===
- (South Africa) Raven Klaasen / (South Africa) Ruan Roelofse def. (Belgium) Julien Cagnina / (Czech Republic) Zdeněk Kolář 6–4, 6–4.
