= 2020 New York Open =

- Date: 10–16 February
- Edition: 3rd
- Category: ATP Tour 250 series
- Draw: 28S/16D
- Surface: Hard / Indoors
- Location: Uniondale, New York, United States
- Venue: Nassau Coliseum

Champions

Singles
- (United Kingdom) Kyle Edmund

Doubles
- (United Kingdom) Dominic Inglot / (Pakistan) Aisam-ul-Haq Qureshi
← 2019 ·	New York Open

The 2020 New York Open was a men's tennis tournament played on indoor hard courts. It was the third edition of the New York Open, and part of the ATP Tour 250 series of the 2020 ATP Tour. It took place in Uniondale, New York, United States, at the Nassau Veterans Memorial Coliseum from February 10 through 16, 2020.

== Singles main-draw entrants ==
=== Seeds ===
Country	Player	Rank^{1}	Seed
USA	John Isner	18	1
CAN	Milos Raonic	32	2
USA	Reilly Opelka	38	3
FRA	Ugo Humbert	43	4
USA	Tennys Sandgren	56	5
SRB	Miomir Kecmanović	57	6
GBR	Cameron Norrie	61	7
GBR	Kyle Edmund	64	8

- ^{1} Rankings are as of February 3, 2020.

=== Other entrants ===
The following players received wildcards into the singles main draw:

- (Canada) Brayden Schnur
- (United States) Brian Shi
- (United States) Jack Sock

The following players received entry from the qualifying draw:

- (Chinese Taipei) Jason Jung
- (Italy) Paolo Lorenzi
- (Serbia) Danilo Petrović
- (Japan) Go Soeda

=== Withdrawals ===
Before the tournament

- (Australia) Nick Kyrgios → replaced by (United States) Marcos Giron
- (Japan) Kei Nishikori → replaced by (Bosnia and Herzegovina) Damir Džumhur
- (United States) Sam Querrey → replaced by (Germany) Dominik Koepfer

== Doubles main-draw entrants ==
=== Seeds ===
Country	Player	Country	Player	Rank^{1}	Seed
USA	Austin Krajicek	CRO	Franko Škugor	76	1
MEX	Santiago González	GBR	Ken Skupski	83	2
NZL	Marcus Daniell	AUT	Philipp Oswald	87	3
GBR	Luke Bambridge	JPN	Ben McLachlan	90	4

- ^{1} Rankings are as of February 3, 2020.

=== Other entrants ===
The following pairs received wildcards into the doubles main draw:

- (United States) John Isner / (United States) Tommy Paul
- (United States) Shawn Jackson / (Russia) Ostap Kovalenko

== Champions ==
=== Singles ===
- (United Kingdom) Kyle Edmund def. (Italy) Andreas Seppi, 7–5, 6–1

=== Doubles ===
- (United Kingdom) Dominic Inglot / (Pakistan) Aisam-ul-Haq Qureshi def. (United States) Steve Johnson / (United States) Reilly Opelka, 7–6^{(7–5)}, 7–6^{(8–6)}
