= 2020 Potchefstroom Open – Doubles =

Doubles
- 2020 Potchefstroom Open

Events
Singles	Doubles
Potchefstroom Open	· 2021 →

This was the first edition of the tournament. The tournament was canceled prior to completion due to the coronavirus pandemic.

== Seeds ==
The top two seeds received a bye into the quarterfinals.

1. (France) Sadio Doumbia / (France) Fabien Reboul
2. (Germany) Dustin Brown / (Austria) Lucas Miedler
3. (Germany) Daniel Masur / (Spain) Roberto Ortega Olmedo
4. (Zimbabwe) Benjamin Lock / (Zimbabwe) Courtney John Lock

== Draw ==
=== Key ===
- Q = Qualifier
- WC = Wild card
- LL = Lucky loser
- Alt = Alternate
- SE = Special exempt
- PR = Protected ranking
- ITF = ITF entry
- JE = Junior exempt
- w/o = Walkover
- r = Retired
- d = Defaulted
- SR = Special ranking

First round
(Czech Republic) M Gengel (Austria) D Pichler	w/o
(Serbia) P Krstin (Serbia) Milan Radojković
4	(Zimbabwe) B Lock (Zimbabwe) CJ Lock	6	6
(Republic of Ireland) S Carr (France) C Denolly	2	3
(France) B Bonzi (France) M Martineau	6	7^{7}
WC	(South Africa) Vasilios Caripi (South Africa) Vaughn Hunter	3	6^{3}
WC	(South Africa) Robbie Arends (South Africa) Khololwam Montsi	4	7^{7}	[6]
(Ukraine) D Kalenichenko (Italy) Fabrizio Ornago	6	6^{4}	[10]
(Russia) E Karlovskiy (Germany) Tobias Simon	5	6	[11]
3	(Germany) D Masur (Spain) R Ortega Olmedo	7	4	[13]
(India) Sidharth Rawat (Netherlands) M Veldheer	6	3
WC	(South Africa) Gerhardt Marius Becker (South Africa) Pierre Malan	3	2^{r}

Quarterfinals
1	(France) S Doumbia (France) F Reboul	3
(Czech Republic) M Gengel (Austria) D Pichler	3
4	(Zimbabwe) B Lock (Zimbabwe) CJ Lock	2
(France) B Bonzi (France) M Martineau	5
(Ukraine) D Kalenichenko (Italy) F Ornago	3	3
3	(Germany) D Masur (Spain) R Ortega Olmedo	6	6
(India) S Rawat (Netherlands) M Veldheer	6^{2}	2
2/PR	(Germany) D Brown (Austria) L Miedler	7^{7}	6

Semifinals
3	(Germany) D Masur (Spain) R Ortega Olmedo
2/PR	(Germany) D Brown (Austria) L Miedler

Final
(Germany)
