= 2020 Potchefstroom Open – Singles =

Singles
- 2020 Potchefstroom Open

Events
Singles	Doubles
Potchefstroom Open	· 2021 →

This was the first edition of the tournament. The tournament was canceled prior to completion due to the coronavirus pandemic.

== Seeds ==
1. (France) Benjamin Bonzi
2. (France) Hugo Grenier
3. (Serbia) Peđa Krstin (first round, retired)
4. (Germany) Dustin Brown
5. (Russia) Evgeny Karlovskiy (second round)
6. (Germany) Daniel Masur
7. (Spain) Roberto Ortega Olmedo (first round)
8. (Italy) Lorenzo Musetti (second round)

== Draw ==
=== Key ===
- Q = Qualifier
- WC = Wild card
- LL = Lucky loser
- Alt = Alternate
- SE = Special exempt
- PR = Protected ranking
- ITF = ITF entry
- JE = Junior exempt
- w/o = Walkover
- r = Retired
- d = Defaulted
- SR = Special ranking

=== Finals ===
Semifinals
(France)
(Germany)

Final

=== Top half ===
First round
1	(France) B Bonzi	7	6
(France) M Martineau	5	2
(Ukraine) D Kalenichenko	7	3	2
(India) Sidharth Rawat	5	6	6
(France) S Doumbia	6	6
(Czech Republic) M Gengel	4	2
WC	(South Africa) Khololwam Montsi	2	7	2
5	(Russia) E Karlovskiy	6	5	6
4	(Germany) D Brown	7^{7}	7
(France) C Denolly	6^{4}	5
(Austria) D Pichler	6	6
Q	(France) Jean Thirouin	2	3
Q	(Italy) Fabrizio Ornago	1	6	2
(Israel) E Leshem	6	3	6
(Israel) Y Oliel	5	4
6	(Germany) D Masur	7	6

Second round
1	(France) B Bonzi	6	7
(India) S Rawat	3	5
(France) S Doumbia	6	2	7^{7}
5	(Russia) E Karlovskiy	4	6	6^{1}
4	(Germany) D Brown	6	3	6
(Austria) D Pichler	3	6	3
(Israel) E Leshem	6	1^{r}
6	(Germany) D Masur	3	1

Quarterfinals
1	(France) B Bonzi
(France) S Doumbia
4	(Germany) D Brown
6	(Germany) D Masur

Semifinals
(France)
(Germany)

=== Bottom half ===
First round
7	(Spain) R Ortega Olmedo	5	3
(United Kingdom) J Draper	7	6
(Morocco) A Moundir	5	3
(Germany) Tobias Simon	7	6
Q	(France) F Reboul	6	6
WC	(South Africa) Gerhardt Marius Becker	3	3
Q	(Zimbabwe) MDA Sibanda	6	4
3	(Serbia) P Krstin	1	2^{r}
8	(Italy) L Musetti	6	7
(Republic of Ireland) S Carr	2	5
(Zimbabwe) B Lock	7^{7}	6
Q	(Germany) Sebastian Prechtel	6^{4}	1
WC	(South Africa) Vaughn Hunter	2	6	0
(Austria) L Miedler	6	3	6
Q	(Netherlands) M Veldheer	6	4	2
2	(France) H Grenier	2	6	6

Second round
(United Kingdom) J Draper	6	4	5
(Germany) T Simon	3	6	4
Q	(France) F Reboul	6	6
Q	(Zimbabwe) MDA Sibanda	4	2
8	(Italy) L Musetti	5	5
(Zimbabwe) B Lock	7	7
(Austria) L Miedler	6^{7}	3
2	(France) H Grenier	7^{9}	6

Quarterfinals
Q	(France) F Reboul
(Zimbabwe) B Lock
2	(France) H Grenier

Semifinals
