= 2018 New York Open – Doubles =

Doubles
- 2018 New York Open

Final
- Champions: (Belarus) Max Mirnyi (Austria) Philipp Oswald
- Runners-up: (Netherlands) Wesley Koolhof (New Zealand) Artem Sitak
- Score: 6–4, 4–6, [10–6]

Events
Singles	Doubles
New York Open (tennis)	· 2019 →

This was the first edition of the tournament.

Max Mirnyi and Philipp Oswald won the title, defeating Wesley Koolhof and Artem Sitak in the final, 6–4, 4–6, [10–6].

== Seeds ==
1. (United States) Bob Bryan / (United States) Mike Bryan (first round)
2. (Belarus) Max Mirnyi / (Austria) Philipp Oswald (champions)
3. (United States) Nicholas Monroe / (Australia) John-Patrick Smith (first round)
4. (Sweden) Robert Lindstedt / (Croatia) Franko Škugor (quarterfinals)

== Draw ==
=== Key ===
- Q = Qualifier
- WC = Wild card
- LL = Lucky loser
- Alt = Alternate
- SE = Special exempt
- PR = Protected ranking
- ITF = ITF entry
- JE = Junior exempt
- w/o = Walkover
- r = Retired
- d = Defaulted
- SR = Special ranking

=== Draw ===
First round
1	(United States) B Bryan (United States) M Bryan	4	4
(France) J Chardy (France) F Martin	6	6
(Netherlands) W Koolhof (New Zealand) A Sitak	6	6
(Canada) D Nestor (United Kingdom) N Skupski	3	1
3	(United States) N Monroe (Australia) J-P Smith	6^{4}	4
Alt	(Moldova) R Albot (Georgia (country)) N Basilashvili	7^{7}	6
(Germany) P Gojowczyk (Philippines) T Huey	6	6
WC	(United States) M McDonald (United States) M Schnur	2	4
(United States) R Harrison (United States) S Johnson	7	6
(United States) S Lipsky (India) D Sharan	5	3
(Australia) M Ebden (United States) D Young	1	4
4	(Sweden) R Lindstedt (Croatia) F Škugor	6	6
WC	(Barbados) D King (United States) F Tiafoe	0	4
(Japan) B McLachlan (France) H Nys	6	6
(India) L Paes (India) P Raja	3	4
2	(Belarus) M Mirnyi (Austria) P Oswald	6	6

Quarterfinals
(France) J Chardy (France) F Martin	4	6	[6]
(Netherlands) W Koolhof (New Zealand) A Sitak	6	3	[10]
Alt	(Moldova) R Albot (Georgia (country)) N Basilashvili	w/o
(Germany) P Gojowczyk (Philippines) T Huey
(United States) R Harrison (United States) S Johnson	6	6^{4}	[10]
4	(Sweden) R Lindstedt (Croatia) F Škugor	1	7^{7}	[7]
(Japan) B McLachlan (France) H Nys	6	3	[5]
2	(Belarus) M Mirnyi (Austria) P Oswald	4	6	[10]

Semifinals
(Netherlands) W Koolhof (New Zealand) A Sitak	6	6
Alt	(Moldova) R Albot (Georgia (country)) N Basilashvili	4	3
(United States) R Harrison (United States) S Johnson	6	4	[7]
2	(Belarus) M Mirnyi (Austria) P Oswald	4	6	[10]

Final
(Netherlands) W Koolhof (New Zealand) A Sitak	4	6	[6]
2	(Belarus) M Mirnyi (Austria) P Oswald	6	4	[10]
