= 2019 New York Open – Doubles =

Doubles
- 2019 New York Open

Final
- Champions: (Germany) Kevin Krawietz (Germany) Andreas Mies
- Runners-up: (Mexico) Santiago González (Pakistan) Aisam-ul-Haq Qureshi
- Score: 6–4, 7–5

Events
| Singles | Doubles |
| ← 2018 · | New York Open (tennis) | · 2020 → |

Max Mirnyi and Philipp Oswald were the defending champions, but Mirnyi retired from professional tennis at the end of 2018 and Oswald chose not to participate this year.

Kevin Krawietz and Andreas Mies won their first ATP Tour title, defeating Santiago González and Aisam-ul-Haq Qureshi in the final, 6–4, 7–5.

== Seeds ==
1. (United States) Bob Bryan / (United States) Mike Bryan (first round)
2. (United Kingdom) Ken Skupski / (United Kingdom) Neal Skupski (first round)
3. (United Kingdom) Luke Bambridge / (United Kingdom) Jonny O'Mara (quarterfinals)
4. (Sweden) Robert Lindstedt / (Germany) Tim Pütz (semifinals)

== Draw ==
=== Key ===
- Q = Qualifier
- WC = Wild card
- LL = Lucky loser
- Alt = Alternate
- SE = Special exempt
- PR = Protected ranking
- ITF = ITF entry
- JE = Junior exempt
- w/o = Walkover
- r = Retired
- d = Defaulted
- SR = Special ranking

=== Draw ===
First round
1 | (United States) B Bryan (United States) M Bryan | 6^{9} | 4
Alt | (United States) T Sandgren (United States) J Withrow | 7^{11} | 6
(Moldova) R Albot (Australia) J-P Smith | 1 | 6 | [8]
(France) A Mannarino (France) H Nys | 6 | 3 | [10]
3 | (United Kingdom) L Bambridge (United Kingdom) J O'Mara | 6 | 6
(Ukraine) D Molchanov (Slovakia) I Zelenay | 4 | 3
WC | (United States) B Evans (United States) J Isner | 3 | 2
(Mexico) S González (Pakistan) A-u-H Qureshi | 6 | 6
Alt | (Italy) P Lorenzi (Canada) P Polansky | 1 | 6 | [11]
(United States) R Harrison (Australia) J Thompson | 6 | 3 | [13]
WC | (Australia) L Hewitt (Australia) A Popyrin | 4 | 4
4 | (Sweden) R Lindstedt (Germany) T Pütz | 6 | 6
(United States) M McDonald (Australia) J Millman | 4 | 6 | [11]
(United States) S Johnson (United States) R Opelka | 6 | 4 | [9]
(Germany) K Krawietz (Germany) A Mies | 7 | 7^{7}
2 | (United Kingdom) K Skupski (United Kingdom) N Skupski | 5 | 6^{3}

Quarterfinals
Alt | (United States) T Sandgren (United States) J Withrow | 6^{6} | 6 | [8]
(France) A Mannarino (France) H Nys | 7^{8} | 4 | [10]
3 | (United Kingdom) L Bambridge (United Kingdom) J O'Mara | 7^{7} | 4 | [5]
(Mexico) S González (Pakistan) A-u-H Qureshi | 6^{1} | 6 | [10]
(United States) R Harrison (Australia) J Thompson | 7^{7} | 2 | [6]
4 | (Sweden) R Lindstedt (Germany) T Pütz | 6^{5} | 6 | [10]
(United States) M McDonald (Australia) J Millman | 3 | 2
(Germany) K Krawietz (Germany) A Mies | 6 | 6

Semifinals
(France) A Mannarino (France) H Nys | 4 | 6 | [10]
(Mexico) S González (Pakistan) A-u-H Qureshi | 6 | 3 | [12]
4 | (Sweden) R Lindstedt (Germany) T Pütz | 2 | 4
(Germany) K Krawietz (Germany) A Mies | 6 | 6

Final
(Mexico) S González (Pakistan) A-u-H Qureshi | 4 | 5
(Germany) K Krawietz (Germany) A Mies | 6 | 7
