= 2019 New York Open – Singles =

Singles
- 2019 New York Open

Final
- Champion: (United States) Reilly Opelka
- Runner-up: (Canada) Brayden Schnur
- Score: 6–1, 6–7^{(7–9)}, 7–6^{(9–7)}

Details
- Draw: 28 (4 Q / 3 WC )
- Seeds: 8

Events
Singles	Doubles
← 2018 ·	New York Open (tennis)	· 2020 →

Kevin Anderson was the defending champion, but withdrew before the tournament began because of a right elbow injury.

Reilly Opelka won his first ATP Tour title, defeating Brayden Schnur in the final, 6–1, 6–7^{(7–9)}, 7–6^{(9–7)}. He saved six match points en route to the title, all in the second-set tiebreak of his semifinal match against John Isner.

== Seeds ==
The top four seeds received a bye into the second round.

1. (United States) John Isner (semifinals)
2. (United States) Frances Tiafoe (second round)
3. (United States) Steve Johnson (second round)
4. (Australia) John Millman (second round)
5. (France) Adrian Mannarino (first round)
6. (United States) Sam Querrey (semifinals)
7. (Australia) Jordan Thompson (quarterfinals)
8. (United States) Tennys Sandgren (first round)

== Draw ==
=== Key ===
- Q = Qualifier
- WC = Wild card
- LL = Lucky loser
- Alt = Alternate
- SE = Special exempt
- PR = Protected ranking
- ITF = ITF entry
- JE = Junior exempt
- w/o = Walkover
- r = Retired
- d = Defaulted
- SR = Special ranking

=== Finals ===
Semifinals
1	(United States) John Isner	7^{10}	6^{14}	6^{4}
(United States) Reilly Opelka	6^{8}	7^{16}	7^{7}
Q	(Canada) Brayden Schnur	7^{9}	4	6
6	(United States) Sam Querrey	6^{7}	6	3

Final
(United States) Reilly Opelka	6	6^{7}	7^{9}
Q	(Canada) Brayden Schnur	1	7^{9}	6^{7}

=== Top half ===
First round
(Slovakia) L Lacko	4	2
(Australia) B Tomic	6	6
Q	(Spain) A Menéndez Maceiras	4	6^{4}
Q	(United States) C Eubanks	6	7^{7}
WC	(United States) N Rubin	7^{9}	5	1
7	(Australia) J Thompson	6^{7}	7	6
(Spain) G García López	7^{8}	6
LL	(Australia) A Popyrin	6^{6}	3
(Uzbekistan) D Istomin	4	6	6
(United States) M McDonald	6	2	3
(United States) R Opelka	2	7^{7}	6
5	(France) A Mannarino	6	6^{5}	4

Second round
1	(United States) J Isner	7^{9}	6
(Australia) B Tomic	6^{7}	4
Q	(United States) C Eubanks	6	1	4
7	(Australia) J Thompson	4	6	6
4	(Australia) J Millman	6^{4}	6	4
(Spain) G García López	7^{7}	1	6
(Uzbekistan) D Istomin	7^{10}	6^{6}	0^{r}
(United States) R Opelka	6^{8}	7^{8}	1

Quarterfinals
1	(United States) J Isner	6	6
7	(Australia) J Thompson	4	1
(Spain) G García López	3	4
(United States) R Opelka	6	6

Semifinals
1	(United States) J Isner	7^{10}	6^{14}	6^{4}
(United States) R Opelka	6^{8}	7^{16}	7^{7}

=== Bottom half ===
First round
8	(United States) T Sandgren	6^{4}	7^{7}	4
(Italy) P Lorenzi	7^{7}	6^{4}	6
(Canada) P Polansky	3	4
(United States) R Harrison	6	6
Q	(Canada) B Schnur	6	6
WC	(Canada) JM Lin	1	3
6	(United States) S Querrey	7^{7}	6
(South Africa) L Harris	6^{2}	2
(Croatia) I Karlović	7^{7}	6^{4}	6^{5}
(Moldova) R Albot	6^{4}	7^{7}	7^{7}
Q	(India) R Ramanathan	3	6	1
(Chinese Taipei) J Jung	6	3	6

Second round
(Italy) P Lorenzi	4	6	6
(United States) R Harrison	6	4	4
Q	(Canada) B Schnur	6	4	7^{7}
3	(United States) S Johnson	4	6	6^{4}
6	(United States) S Querrey	6	6
(Moldova) R Albot	3	4
(Chinese Taipei) J Jung	6	7
2/WC	(United States) F Tiafoe	3	5

Quarterfinals
(Italy) P Lorenzi	7^{9}	6^{5}	5
Q	(Canada) B Schnur	6^{7}	7^{7}	7
6	(United States) S Querrey	6	3	6
(Chinese Taipei) J Jung	3	6	3

Semifinals
Q	(Canada) B Schnur	7^{9}	4	6
6	(United States) S Querrey	6^{7}	6	3

== Qualifying ==
=== Seeds ===
1. (Spain) Adrián Menéndez Maceiras (qualified)
2. (Australia) Alexei Popyrin (qualifying competition, lucky loser)
3. (India) Ramkumar Ramanathan (qualified)
4. (United States) Christopher Eubanks (qualified)
5. (Canada) Brayden Schnur (qualified)
6. (Japan) Yasutaka Uchiyama (first round)
7. (Ecuador) Roberto Quiroz (first round)
8. (Italy) Andrea Arnaboldi (qualifying competition)

=== Qualifiers ===
1. (Spain) Adrián Menéndez Maceiras
2. (Canada) Brayden Schnur
3. (India) Ramkumar Ramanathan
4. (United States) Christopher Eubanks

=== Lucky loser ===
1. (Australia) Alexei Popyrin

=== Qualifying draw ===
==== First qualifier ====
First round
1	(Spain) Adrián Menéndez Maceiras	6	6
Alt	(Germany) Tim Pütz	3	2
(Japan) Yosuke Watanuki	5	6	3
8	(Italy) Andrea Arnaboldi	7	4	6

Qualifying competition
1	(Spain) Adrián Menéndez Maceiras	6	7^{9}
8	(Italy) Andrea Arnaboldi	3	6^{7}

==== Second qualifier ====
First round
2	(Australia) Alexei Popyrin	7	6
(United Kingdom) James Ward	5	4
WC	(United States) Cannon Kingsley	6^{3}	3
5	(Canada) Brayden Schnur	7^{7}	6

Qualifying competition
2	(Australia) Alexei Popyrin	4	6^{8}
5	(Canada) Brayden Schnur	6	7^{10}

==== Third qualifier ====
First round
3	(India) Ramkumar Ramanathan	4	6	6
Alt	(United States) Roy Smith	6	2	4
(United States) Tim Smyczek	6^{6}	6	7
7	(Ecuador) Roberto Quiroz	7^{8}	3	5

Qualifying competition
3	(India) Ramkumar Ramanathan	6	3	7
(United States) Tim Smyczek	3	6	5

==== Fourth qualifier ====
First round
4	(United States) Christopher Eubanks	6	6
WC	(United States) Adam El Mihdawy	3	2
(United States) Ernesto Escobedo	4	6	7^{7}
6	(Japan) Yasutaka Uchiyama	6	3	6^{5}

Qualifying competition
4	(United States) Christopher Eubanks	5	6	7
(United States) Ernesto Escobedo	7	3	5
