= 2018 New York Open =

- Date: 12–18 February
- Edition: 1st
- Draw: 28S / 16D
- Prize money: $668,460
- Surface: Hard / Indoors
- Location: Uniondale, United States
- Venue: Nassau Veterans Memorial Coliseum

Champions

Singles
- (South Africa) Kevin Anderson

Doubles
- (Belarus) Max Mirnyi / (Austria) Philipp Oswald
- New York Open (tennis)

The 2018 New York Open was a men's tennis tournament played on indoor hard courts. It was the first edition of the event in New York after it moved from Memphis, and part of the ATP World Tour 250 series of the 2018 ATP World Tour. The event took place at the Nassau Veterans Memorial Coliseum in Uniondale, New York, United States, from February 12 through 18, 2018. The tournament was the first on the ATP World Tour to use black tennis courts.

== Singles main draw entrants ==
=== Seeds ===
Country	Player	Rank^{1}	Seed
RSA	Kevin Anderson	5	1
USA	Sam Querrey	11	2
USA	John Isner	12	3
FRA	Adrian Mannarino	24	4
JPN	Kei Nishikori	26	5
USA	Ryan Harrison	44	6
USA	Steve Johnson	49	7
GEO	Nikoloz Basilashvili	56	8

- Rankings are as of February 5, 2018.

=== Other entrants ===
The following players received wildcards into the singles main draw:

- (United States) Sebastian Korda
- (United States) Mackenzie McDonald
- (United States) Noah Rubin

The following players received entry from the qualifying draw:

- (United States) Ernesto Escobedo
- (United States) Bjorn Fratangelo
- (Spain) Adrián Menéndez Maceiras
- (Italy) Stefano Travaglia

=== Withdrawals ===
Before the tournament

- (South Korea) Chung Hyeon → replaced by (Russia) Mikhail Youzhny

=== Retirements ===
- (Germany) Peter Gojowczyk

== Doubles main draw entrants ==
=== Seeds ===
Country	Player	Country	Player	Rank^{1}	Seed
USA	Bob Bryan	USA	Mike Bryan	6	1
BLR	Max Mirnyi	AUT	Philipp Oswald	84	2
USA	Nicholas Monroe	AUS	John-Patrick Smith	97	3
SWE	Robert Lindstedt	CRO	Franko Škugor	102	4

- Rankings are as of February 5, 2018.

=== Other entrants ===
The following pairs received wildcards into the doubles main draw:

- (Barbados) Darian King / (United States) Frances Tiafoe
- (United States) Mackenzie McDonald / (United States) Max Schnur

The following pair received entry as alternates:

- (Moldova) Radu Albot / (Georgia (country)) Nikoloz Basilashvili

=== Withdrawals ===
Before the tournament

- (United States) Sam Querrey

== Champions ==
=== Singles ===
- (South Africa) Kevin Anderson def. (United States) Sam Querrey, 4–6, 6–3, 7–6^{(7–1)}

=== Doubles ===
- (Belarus) Max Mirnyi / (Austria) Philipp Oswald def. (Netherlands) Wesley Koolhof / (New Zealand) Artem Sitak, 6–4, 4–6, [10–6].
