= 2020 Potchefstroom Open =

- Date: 10–15 March
- Edition: 1st
- Surface: Hard
- Location: Potchefstroom, South Africa

Champions

Singles
- no champion

Doubles
- no champions
Potchefstroom Open	· 2021 →

The 2020 Potchefstroom Open was a professional tennis tournament played on hard courts. It was the first edition of the tournament which was part of the 2020 ATP Challenger Tour. It took place in Potchefstroom, South Africa between 10 and 15 March 2020. The tournament was canceled prior to completion due to the coronavirus pandemic.

== Singles main-draw entrants ==
=== Seeds ===
Country	Player	Rank^{1}	Seed
FRA	Benjamin Bonzi	236	1
FRA	Hugo Grenier	237	2
SRB	Peđa Krstin	239	3
GER	Dustin Brown	241	4
RUS	Evgeny Karlovskiy	246	5
GER	Daniel Masur	249	6
ESP	Roberto Ortega Olmedo	273	7
ITA	Lorenzo Musetti	286	8

- ^{1} Rankings are as of 2 March 2020.

=== Other entrants ===
The following players received wildcards into the singles main draw:

- (South Africa) Gerhardt Marius Becker
- (South Africa) Vaughn Hunter
- (South Africa) Khololwam Montsi

The following players received entry from the qualifying draw:

- (Italy) Fabrizio Ornago
- (Germany) Sebastian Prechtel
- (France) Fabien Reboul
- (Zimbabwe) Mehluli Don Ayanda Sibanda
- (France) Jean Thirouin
- (Netherlands) Mick Veldheer

== Champions ==
=== Singles ===
- tournament canceled

=== Doubles ===
- tournament canceled
