= 2018 New York Open – Singles =

Singles
- 2018 New York Open

Final
- Champion: (South Africa) Kevin Anderson
- Runner-up: (United States) Sam Querrey
- Score: 4–6, 6–3, 7–6^{(7–1)}

Details
- Draw: 28 (4 Q / 3 WC )
- Seeds: 8

Events
Singles	Doubles
New York Open (tennis)	· 2019 →

This was the first edition of the tournament.

Kevin Anderson won the title, defeating Sam Querrey in the final, 4–6, 6–3, 7–6^{(7–1)}.

== Seeds ==
The top four seeds receive a bye into the second round.

1. (South Africa) Kevin Anderson (champion)
2. (United States) Sam Querrey (final)
3. (United States) John Isner (second round)
4. (France) Adrian Mannarino (semifinals)
5. (Japan) Kei Nishikori (semifinals)
6. (United States) Ryan Harrison (second round)
7. (United States) Steve Johnson (first round)
8. (Georgia (country)) Nikoloz Basilashvili (first round)

== Draw ==
=== Key ===
- Q = Qualifier
- WC = Wild card
- LL = Lucky loser
- Alt = Alternate
- SE = Special exempt
- PR = Protected ranking
- ITF = ITF entry
- JE = Junior exempt
- w/o = Walkover
- r = Retired
- d = Defaulted
- SR = Special ranking

=== Finals ===
Semifinals
1	(South Africa) Kevin Anderson	6	3	7^{7}
5	(Japan) Kei Nishikori	1	6	6^{4}
4	(France) Adrian Mannarino	7^{7}	5	3
2	(United States) Sam Querrey	6^{5}	7	6

Final
1	(South Africa) Kevin Anderson	4	6	7^{7}
2	(United States) Sam Querrey	6	3	6^{1}

=== Top half ===
First round
Q	(United States) E Escobedo	4	6	7^{7}
WC	(United States) M McDonald	6	3	6^{5}
(United States) F Tiafoe	4	6	6
WC	(United States) S Korda	6	4	2
(Israel) D Sela	6	6
8	(Georgia (country)) N Basilashvili	4	4
(Moldova) R Albot	6	6
Q	(United States) B Fratangelo	4	3
(Dominican Republic) V Estrella Burgos	5	1
(Russia) E Donskoy	7	6
WC	(United States) N Rubin	5	3
5	(Japan) K Nishikori	7	6

Second round
1	(South Africa) K Anderson	3	6	7^{7}
Q	(United States) E Escobedo	6	4	6^{5}
(United States) F Tiafoe	6	3	6
(Israel) D Sela	4	6	0
3	(United States) J Isner	6^{5}	6	3
(Moldova) R Albot	7^{7}	3	6
(Russia) E Donskoy	2	4
5	(Japan) K Nishikori	6	6

Quarterfinals
1	(South Africa) K Anderson	6	5	6
(United States) F Tiafoe	3	7	4
(Moldova) R Albot	6	3	1
5	(Japan) K Nishikori	4	6	6

Semifinals
1	(South Africa) K Anderson	6	3	7^{7}
5	(Japan) K Nishikori	1	6	6^{4}

=== Bottom half ===
First round
7	(United States) S Johnson	6	3	6^{7}
Q	(Spain) A Menéndez Maceiras	1	6	7^{9}
Q	(Italy) S Travaglia	6	6^{1}	4
(France) J Chardy	4	7^{7}	6
(Slovenia) B Kavčič	4	2
(Germany) P Gojowczyk	6	6
6	(United States) R Harrison	6	7^{7}
(United States) D Young	3	6^{4}
(United States) J Donaldson	4	6^{4}
(Croatia) I Karlović	6	7^{7}
(Russia) M Youzhny	3	6	6
(Australia) M Ebden	6	3	4

Second round
Q	(Spain) A Menéndez Maceiras	7	7^{7}
(France) J Chardy	5	6^{5}
(Germany) P Gojowczyk	7^{7}	5	1^{r}
4	(France) A Mannarino	6^{5}	7	4
6	(United States) R Harrison	4	4
(Croatia) I Karlović	6	6
(Russia) M Youzhny	4	3
2	(United States) S Querrey	6	6

Quarterfinals
Q	(Spain) A Menéndez Maceiras	5	6	3
4	(France) A Mannarino	7	2	6
(Croatia) I Karlović	6^{5}	6^{4}
2	(United States) S Querrey	7^{7}	7^{7}

Semifinals
4	(France) A Mannarino	7^{7}	5	3
2	(United States) S Querrey	6^{5}	7	6

== Qualifying ==
=== Seeds ===
1. (Japan) Taro Daniel (first round)
2. (United States) Bjorn Fratangelo (qualified)
3. (United Kingdom) Cameron Norrie (first round)
4. (United States) Tim Smyczek (qualifying competition)
5. (Spain) Adrián Menéndez Maceiras (qualified)
6. (Kazakhstan) Alexander Bublik (qualifying competition)
7. (United States) Ernesto Escobedo (qualified)
8. (Italy) Stefano Travaglia (qualified)

=== Qualifiers ===
1. (United States) Ernesto Escobedo
2. (United States) Bjorn Fratangelo
3. (Spain) Adrián Menéndez Maceiras
4. (Italy) Stefano Travaglia

=== Qualifying draw ===
==== First qualifier ====
First round
1	(Japan) Taro Daniel	5	3
WC	(United States) Christopher Eubanks	7	6
(India) Ramkumar Ramanathan	5	3
7	(United States) Ernesto Escobedo	7	6

Qualifying competition
WC	(United States) Christopher Eubanks	7	4	4
7	(United States) Ernesto Escobedo	5	6	6

==== Second qualifier ====
First round
2	(United States) Bjorn Fratangelo	6	6
WC	(United States) Gary Kushnirovich	4	2
(Austria) Sebastian Ofner	5	1
6	(Kazakhstan) Alexander Bublik	7	6

Qualifying competition
2	(United States) Bjorn Fratangelo	6	3	7^{7}
6	(Kazakhstan) Alexander Bublik	4	6	6^{2}

==== Third qualifier ====
First round
3	(United Kingdom) Cameron Norrie	4	6^{7}
Alt	(United Kingdom) Liam Broady	6	7^{9}
Alt	(Barbados) Darian King	6^{6}	5
5	(Spain) Adrián Menéndez Maceiras	7^{8}	7

Qualifying competition
Alt	(United Kingdom) Liam Broady	5	3
5	(Spain) Adrián Menéndez Maceiras	7	6

==== Fourth qualifier ====
First round
4	(United States) Tim Smyczek	6	6
(United States) Michael Mmoh	2	3
(Canada) Peter Polansky	7	4	4
8	(Italy) Stefano Travaglia	5	6	6

Qualifying competition
4	(United States) Tim Smyczek	3	6	6^{3}
8	(Italy) Stefano Travaglia	6	2	7^{7}
