= Ostap Kovalenko =

Russian tennis player

- Full name: Ostap Vital'yevich Kovalenko
- Native name: Остап Витальевич Коваленко
- Country (sports): Russia
- Born: 1 March 2001 (age 24) Bashkortostan, Russia
- College: Hofstra

Singles
- Career record: 0–0 (at ATP Tour level, Grand Slam level, and in Davis Cup)
- Career titles: 0

Doubles
- Career record: 0–0 (at ATP Tour level, Grand Slam level, and in Davis Cup)
- Career titles: 0
- Last updated on: 10 February 2020.

Ostap Vital'yevich Kovalenko (Russian: Остап Витальевич Коваленко; born 1 March 2001) is a Russian tennis player.

Kovalenko has a career high ITF junior combined ranking of 326 achieved on 31 December 2018.

Kovalenko made his ATP main draw debut at the 2020 New York Open after receiving a wildcard for the doubles main draw.

Kovalenko played college tennis for Hofstra University under Head Coach Jason Pasion.
