= Shawn Jackson =

American tennis player

- Full name: Shawn Jackson
- Country (sports): United States
- Born: September 6, 2000 (age 25) Staten Island, United States
- College: Hofstra

Singles
- Career record: 0–0 (at ATP Tour level, Grand Slam level, and in Davis Cup)
- Career titles: 0

Doubles
- Career record: 0–1 (at ATP Tour level, Grand Slam level, and in Davis Cup)
- Career titles: 0
- Last updated on: February 10, 2020.

Shawn Jackson (born September 6, 2000) is an American tennis player.

Jackson made his ATP main draw debut at the 2020 New York Open after receiving a wildcard for the doubles main draw.

Jackson played college tennis for Hofstra University under Head Coach Jason Pasion.
