= Brian Shi =

American tennis player (born 2000)

- Country (sports): United States
- Born: 24 February 2000 (age 26) Jericho, United States
- College: Harvard
- Prize money: $1,938

Singles
- Career record: 0–0 (at ATP Tour level, Grand Slam level, and in Davis Cup)
- Career titles: 0
- Highest ranking: No. 1193 (13 August 2018)

Doubles
- Career record: 0–0 (at ATP Tour level, Grand Slam level, and in Davis Cup)
- Career titles: 0
- Last updated on: 10 February 2020.

Brian Shi (born 24 February 2000) is an American tennis player.

Shi has a career high ATP singles ranking of 1193 achieved on 13 August 2018.

Shi made his ATP main draw debut at the 2020 New York Open after receiving a wildcard for the singles main draw.

Shi played college tennis at Harvard University.
