= New York Open (tennis) =

Defunct tennis tournament
- Founded: 2018
- Abolished: 2020
- Editions: 3
- Location: Uniondale, New York; United States
- Venue: Nassau Veterans Memorial Coliseum
- Category: ATP Tour 250
- Surface: Hard / indoors
- Draw: 28S / 16Q / 16D
- Prize money: US$804,180 (2020)
- Website: NewYorkOpen.com

The New York Open was an ATP indoor hard court tennis tournament held in Uniondale, New York, United States. The event took place at the Nassau Veterans Memorial Coliseum. The tournament was created in 2018 to replace the Memphis Open, which was canceled due to lack of sponsorship. Its distinctive difference to other tournaments was the use of black tennis courts made of Hardwood. In 2022, the tournament was moved to Dallas, Texas, and rechristened the Dallas Open.

== Finals ==
=== Singles ===
Year	Champions	Runners-up	Score
2018	(South Africa) Kevin Anderson	(United States) Sam Querrey	4–6, 6–3, 7–6^{(7–1)}
2019	(United States) Reilly Opelka	(Canada) Brayden Schnur	6–1, 6–7^{(7–9)}, 7–6,^{(9–7)}
2020	(United Kingdom) Kyle Edmund	(Italy) Andreas Seppi	7–5, 6–1

=== Doubles ===
Year	Champions	Runners-up	Score
2018	(Belarus) Max Mirnyi (Austria) Philipp Oswald	(Netherlands) Wesley Koolhof (New Zealand) Artem Sitak	6–4, 4–6, [10–6]
2019	(Germany) Kevin Krawietz (Germany) Andreas Mies	(Mexico) Santiago González (Pakistan) Aisam-ul-Haq Qureshi	6–4, 7-5
2020	(Pakistan) Aisam-ul-Haq Qureshi (United Kingdom) Dominic Inglot	(United States) Steve Johnson (United States) Reilly Opelka	7–6^{(7–5)}, 7–6^{(8–6)}
