= Potchefstroom Open =

Tennis tournament in South Africa

- 2021 Potchefstroom Open II

Defunct tennis tournament
- Event name: Potchefstroom Open
- Location: Potchefstroom, North West (South African province), South Africa
- Venue: North-West University Potchefstroom Campus
- Category: ATP Challenger Tour 50
- Surface: Hard
- Draw: 32S/24Q/16D

The Potchefstroom Open was a professional tennis tournament played on hard courts. It was part of the ATP Challenger Tour. It was held in Potchefstroom, South Africa in 2021.

== Past finals ==
=== Singles ===
Year	Champion	Runner-up	Score
2021 (2)	(United States) Jenson Brooksby	(Russia) Teymuraz Gabashvili	2–6, 6–3, 6–0
2021 (1)	(France) Benjamin Bonzi	(United Kingdom) Liam Broady	7–5, 6–4
2020	Cancelled after the quarterfinal round due to the COVID-19 pandemic		

=== Doubles ===
Year	Champions	Runners-up	Score
2021 (2)	(South Africa) Raven Klaasen (South Africa) Ruan Roelofse	(Belgium) Julien Cagnina (Czech Republic) Zdeněk Kolář	6–4, 6–4
2021 (1)	(Switzerland) Marc-Andrea Hüsler (Czech Republic) Zdeněk Kolář	(Canada) Peter Polansky (Canada) Brayden Schnur	6–4, 2–6, [10–4]
2020	Cancelled after the quarterfinal round due to the COVID-19 pandemic		
