= Julien Cagnina =

Belgian tennis player (born 1994)

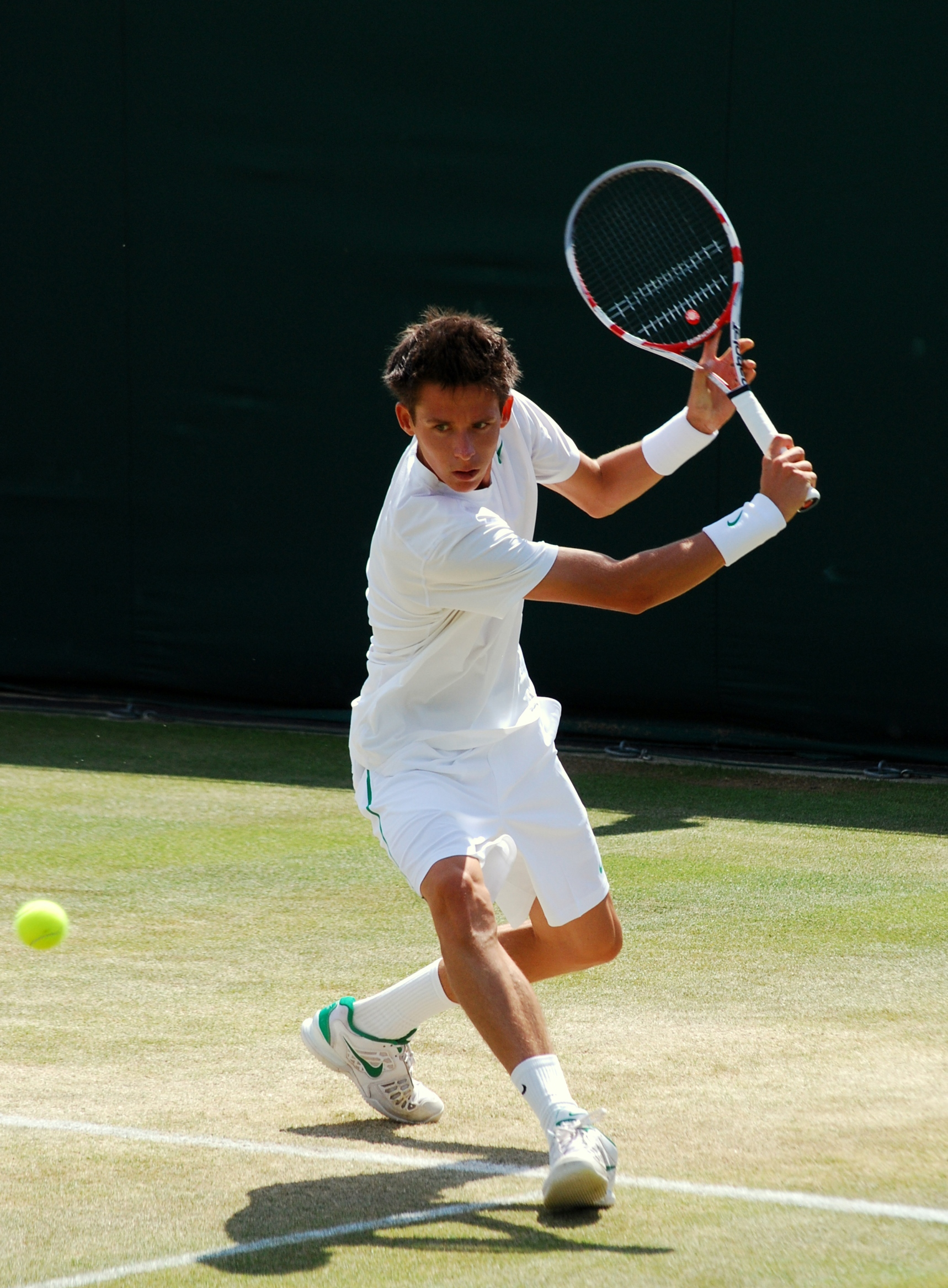
- Cagnina at the 2011 Wimbledon Championships
- Country (sports): Belgium
- Residence: Liège, Belgium
- Born: 4 June 1994 (age 31) Liège, Belgium
- Height: 1.83 m (6 ft 0 in)
- Plays: Right-handed (two-handed backhand)
- Prize money: $101,010

Singles
- Career record: 0–1 (at ATP Tour level, Grand Slam level, and in Davis Cup)
- Career titles: 0
- Highest ranking: No. 239 (30 October 2017)

Doubles
- Career record: 0–0 (at ATP Tour level, Grand Slam level, and in Davis Cup)
- Career titles: 0
- Highest ranking: No. 353 (10 October 2015)

Team competitions
- Davis Cup: 0–1

Julien Cagnina (born 4 June 1994) is a Belgian tennis player.

Cagnina has a career high ATP singles ranking of No. 239 achieved on 30 October 2017 and a career high ATP doubles ranking of No. 353 achieved on 10 October 2015.

Cagnina represents Belgium at the Davis Cup, where he has a W/L record of 0–1.

== Future and Challenger finals ==
=== Singles 28 (17–11) ===
Legend ATP Challenger Tour (0–0) ITF Futures Tour (17–11)	Titles by surface Hard (2–1) Clay (15–10) Grass (0–0) Carpet (0–0)

Result	W–L	Date	Tournament	Tier	Surface	Opponent	Score
Loss	0–1	Aug 2012	Belgium F7, Eupen	Futures	Clay	(France) Jonathan Eysseric	4–6, 3–6
Loss	0–2	Jun 2013	Belgium F1, Brussels	Futures	Clay	(France) Tak Khunn Wang	3–6, 6–3, 0–6
Loss	0–3	Jul 2013	Belgium F4, Knokke	Futures	Clay	(Belgium) Joris De Loore	0–6, 2–6
Loss	0–4	Jul 2013	Belgium F5, Heist	Futures	Clay	(Belgium) Kimmer Coppejans	6–7^{(3–7)}, 6–4, 1–6
Win	1–4	Sep 2013	Serbia F13, Niš	Futures	Clay	(Romania) Vasile Antonescu	6–2, 6–3
Win	2–4	Mar 2014	Bahrain F1, Manama	Futures	Hard	(Germany) Peter Heller	6–2, 6–3
Loss	2–5	Jun 2014	Slovenia F2, Maribor	Futures	Clay	(Slovakia) Jozef Kovalík	6–7^{(2–7)}, 1–6
Loss	2–6	Jun 2014	Slovenia F3, Litija	Futures	Clay	(Serbia) Miki Janković	2–6, 1–3 ret.
Win	3–6	Jul 2014	Belgium F8, Heist	Futures	Clay	(Belgium) Olivier Rochus	6–2, 6–4
Win	4–6	Aug 2014	Belgium F11, Koksijde	Futures	Clay	(Netherlands) Scott Griekspoor	2–6, 7–6^{(7–1)}, 6–3
Loss	4–7	Aug 2014	Belgium F12, Huy	Futures	Clay	(Germany) Jan Choinski	6–3, 4–6, 6–7^{(3–7)}
Loss	4–8	Sep 2014	Belgium F15, Middelkerke	Futures	Clay	(Belgium) Germain Gigounon	4–6, 6–7^{(3–7)}
Win	5–8	Nov 2014	Tunisia F7, Sousse	Futures	Hard	(Spain) David Pérez Sanz	1–6, 6–2, 6–4
Win	6–8	Jul 2015	Belgium F4, De Haan	Futures	Clay	(France) Maxime Tabatruong	6–4, 7–6^{(9–7)}
Win	7–8	Jul 2015	Belgium F7, Duinbergen	Futures	Clay	(Belgium) Joris De Loore	6–1, 3–1 ret.
Loss	7–9	Aug 2015	Belgium F8, Middelkerke	Futures	Hard	(Belgium) Joran Vliegen	6–4, 3–6, 6–7^{(2–7)}
Win	8–9	May 2016	Sweden F2, Båstad	Futures	Clay	(Japan) Kaichi Uchida	6–4, 3–6, 6–2
Win	9–9	Nov 2016	Tunisia F30, Hammamet	Futures	Clay	(Portugal) João Domingues	3–6, 6–3, 7–5
Loss	9–10	Apr 2017	Turkey F12, Antalya	Futures	Clay	(Russia) Ivan Nedelko	2–6, 6–2, 4–6
Win	10–10	Jun 2017	Turkey F21, Antalya	Futures	Clay	(Serbia) Miomir Kecmanović	6–3, 6–4
Win	11–10	Jul 2017	Belgium F3, De Haan	Futures	Clay	(Belgium) Yannick Vandenbulcke	6–7^{(7–9)}, 7–6^{(7–2)}, 6–4
Win	12–10	Jul 2017	Belgium F6, Duinbergen	Futures	Clay	(Germany) Mats Moraing	6–0, 2–6, 7–5
Win	13–10	Aug 2017	Finland F2, Hyvinkää	Futures	Clay	(Estonia) Jürgen Zopp	0–6, 7–5, 6–0
Win	14–10	Aug 2017	Belgium F9, Koksijde	Futures	Clay	(France) Antoine Hoang	7–5, 3–6, 7–6^{(7–3)}
Win	15–10	Aug 2017	Belgium F10, Lambermont	Futures	Clay	(Belgium) Clément Geens	6–1, 6–7^{(3–7)}, 6–3
Win	16–10	Sep 2017	Turkey F35, Antalya	Futures	Clay	(Romania) Dragoș Dima	6–3, 6–3
Win	17–10	Jan 2018	United States F4, Sunrise	Futures	Clay	(Japan) Naoki Nakagawa	6–7^{(5–7)}, 6–3, 6–3
Loss	17–11	Jan 2020	M15 Antalya, Turkey	World Tennis Tour	Clay	(Spain) Javier Barranco Cosano	4–6, 6–2, 1–6

== Davis Cup ==
=== Participations: (0–1) ===
Group membership World Group (0–1) Qualifying Round (0–0) WG Play-off (0–0) Group I (0–0) Group II (0–0) Group III (0–0) Group IV (0–0)	Matches by surface Hard (0–1) Clay (0–0) Grass (0–0) Carpet (0–0)	Matches by type Singles (0–1) Doubles (0–0)

- ▲ ▼ indicates the outcome of the Davis Cup match followed by the score, date, place of event, the zonal classification and its phase, and the court surface.

Rubber outcome	No.	Rubber	Match type (partner if any)	Opponent nation	Opponent player(s)	Score
▲3–2; 2–4 February 2018; Country Hall Liège, Liège, Belgium; World Group First round; Hard (indoor) surface
Defeat	1	V	Singles (dead rubber)	Hungary	Zsombor Piros	3–6, 6–7^{(3–7)}
