= Brayden Schnur =

Canadian tennis player

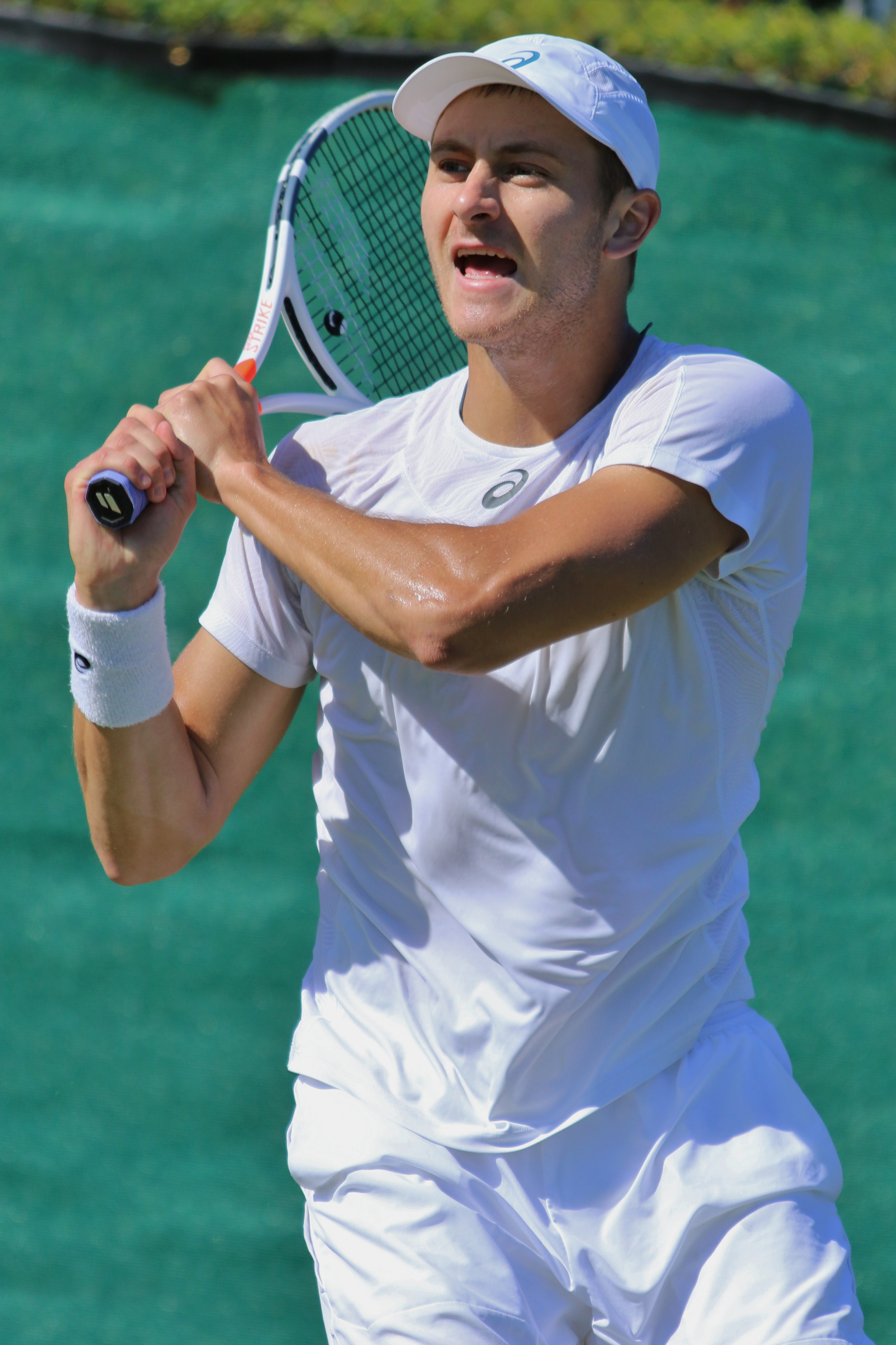
- Schnur at the 2018 Wimbledon Championships
- Country (sports): Canada
- Residence: Grand Bahama, Bahamas
- Born: July 4, 1995 (age 30) Pickering, Ontario, Canada
- Height: 1.94 m (6 ft 4 1/2 in)
- Turned pro: 2016
- Retired: Oct 2023 (last match played)
- Plays: Right-handed (two-handed backhand)
- College: North Carolina Tar Heels
- Coach: Raheel Manji
- Prize money: US$887,903

Singles
- Career record: 4–19
- Career titles: 0
- Highest ranking: No. 92 (19 August 2019)

Grand Slam singles results
- Australian Open: Q2 (2020)
- French Open: Q2 (2020)
- Wimbledon: 1R (2019)
- US Open: 1R (2019)

Doubles
- Career record: 1–6
- Career titles: 0
- Highest ranking: No. 251 (8 Mar 2021)
- Last updated on: 18 August 2023.

Brayden Schnur (born July 4, 1995) is a Canadian former professional tennis player. He reached a career-high ATP singles ranking of No. 92 in August 2019. Schnur was a part of the University of North Carolina at Chapel Hill tennis team from January 2014 to May 2016. He turned professional in July 2016 at the Rogers Cup. Schnur was a member of the Canadian team that won the 2022 ATP Cup.

== Early life ==
Schnur was born in Pickering, Ontario, to Chris Schnur and Anne-Marie Nielsen; he has a younger sister named Amanda. He first started playing tennis at the age of eight, on public courts near his home in Pickering. Schnur left home at the age of 14 and moved to Bradenton, Florida, where he trained with Heath Turpin. He was part of Tennis Canada's National Training Centre from 2011 to 2013 under the guidance of Guillaume Marx.

== Tennis career ==
=== 2011–13 ===
In April 2011, Schnur won the first title of his career on the Junior Circuit at the G5 in Burlington. He played his first professional tournament at the Futures in Indian Harbour Beach in June 2011 where he lost in qualifying. In February 2012, Schnur and fellow Canadian Hugo Di Feo won the doubles title at the G2 junior tournament in La Paz. The pair also won the junior doubles title at the GB1 in Tulsa in October 2012.

In July 2013, Schnur reached his first professional singles final at the Futures in Kelowna but was defeated in three sets by compatriot Philip Bester. A month later at the Futures in Calgary, Schnur won the first professional singles of his career with a revenge victory over Bester. At the end of August 2013, he became the first Canadian man to win the G1 junior tournament in Repentigny. In November 2013, Schnur won his first pro doubles title with a win over Alex Llompart and Finn Tearney.

=== 2014 ===
At the Richmond Futures in June, Schnur made it to his second professional doubles final but lost to Rik de Voest and his partner. Two weeks later at the Futures in Saskatoon, he captured the second pro doubles title of his career with a straight sets victory over Mousheg Hovhannisyan and Alexander Sarkissian. In July, Schnur reached the semifinals in doubles of the 2014 Challenger Banque Nationale de Granby. At the Rogers Cup in August, Schnur qualified for his first ATP main draw with wins over world No. 94 Matthew Ebden and 9th seed Yūichi Sugita. He lost to world No. 51 Andreas Seppi in the first round. In August at the Futures in Calgary, Schnur captured the third doubles title of his career with Tar Heels teammate Jack Murray after defeating Dimitar Kutrovsky and Dennis Nevolo. In late October, Schnur captured the NCAA regional singles title, providing him with a bid into the 2014 National Indoor Championships in New York. Schnur then went on to take the 2014 Singles National Indoor Championships.

=== 2015–16 ===
In June 2015 at the Richmond Futures, Schnur reached the third singles final of his career but fell in three sets to compatriot Philip Bester. In July, he was part of the Canadian team at the 2015 Pan American Games in Toronto where he made it to the quarterfinals in singles. In August at the 2015 Rogers Cup qualifying, Schnur upset world No. 98 Ruben Bemelmans in straight sets in the first round but was defeated by world No. 76 Lu Yen-hsun in the final round.

Schnur captured his second pro singles title in September 2016 after defeating Tim van Rijthoven at the Calgary Futures. Also in September 2016, he won the doubles title at the Niagara-on-the-Lake Futures with fellow Canadian Filip Peliwo and reached the final in singles. In December 2016, he won his third Futures singles title with a victory over JC Aragone in Tallahassee.

=== 2017–18 ===
Schnur won the fourth ITF singles title of his career in April 2017at the 25K in Little Rock with a victory over compatriot Philip Bester. He captured his second straight Futures title three weeks later in Abuja, defeating Fabiano de Paula in the final.

In January 2018, at his first tournament of the season, he reached the final of his first ATP Challenger at the 75K in Playford, but was defeated by Jason Kubler.

=== 2019 ===
In February 2019, the Canadian reached the singles final of the New York Open, where he lost to Reilly Opelka. After reaching the final, his ranking moved to a then career-high 107th in the world. Schnur made the men's singles draw of a Grand Slam for the first time at Wimbledon, when he replaced Borna Ćorić as a lucky loser after the Croatian player withdrew with an injury. He also entered at the US Open as a direct entry, his only other Major participation.

== ATP career finals ==
=== Singles: 1 (1 runner-up) ===
Legend Grand Slam tournaments (0–0) ATP World Tour Finals (0–0) ATP World Tour Masters 1000 (0–0) ATP World Tour 500 Series (0–0) ATP World Tour 250 Series (0–1)	Titles by surface Hard (0–1) Clay (0–0) Grass (0–0)	Titles by setting Outdoor (0–0) Indoor (0–1)

Result	W–L	Date	Tournament	Tier	Surface	Opponent	Score
Loss	0–1	Feb 2019	New York Open, United States	250 Series	Hard (i)	(United States) Reilly Opelka	1–6, 7–6^{(9–7)}, 6–7^{(7–9)}

== Other finals ==
=== Team competitions: 2 (1 title, 1 runner-up) ===
Result	Date	Tournament	Surface	Partners	Opponents	Score
Loss	Nov 2019	Davis Cup, Madrid	Hard (i)	(Canada) Denis Shapovalov (Canada) Félix Auger-Aliassime (Canada) Vasek Pospisil	(Spain) Rafael Nadal (Spain) Roberto Bautista Agut (Spain) Pablo Carreño Busta (Spain) Feliciano López (Spain) Marcel Granollers	0–2
Win	Jan 2022	ATP Cup, Sydney	Hard	(Canada) Félix Auger-Aliassime (Canada) Denis Shapovalov (Canada) Steven Diez	(Spain) Roberto Bautista Agut (Spain) Pablo Carreño Busta (Spain) A Davidovich Fokina (Spain) Albert Ramos Viñolas (Spain) Pedro Martínez	2–0

== Challenger and Futures finals ==
=== Singles: 12 (5–7) ===
Legend (singles) ATP Challenger Tour (0–4) ITF Futures Tour (5–3)	Titles by surface Hard (5–7) Clay (0–0) Grass (0–0) Carpet (0–0)

Result	W–L	Date	Tournament	Tier	Surface	Opponent	Score
Loss	0–1	Jul 2013	Canada F3, Kelowna	Futures	Hard	(Canada) Philip Bester	7–6^{(11–9)}, 6–7^{(6–8)}, 3–6
Win	1–1	Aug 2013	Canada F5, Calgary	Futures	Hard	(Canada) Philip Bester	7–6^{(7–5)}, 3–6, 7–6^{(7–4)}
Loss	1–2	Jun 2015	Canada F3, Richmond	Futures	Hard	(Canada) Philip Bester	6–3, 4–6, 6–7^{(4–7)}
Win	2–2	Sep 2016	Canada F6, Calgary	Futures	Hard	(Netherlands) Tim van Rijthoven	6–3, 3–6, 6–3
Loss	2–3	Sep 2016	Canada F9, Niagara-on-the-Lake	Futures	Hard (i)	(United States) Adam El Mihdawy	6–4, 5–7, 4–6
Win	3–3	Dec 2016	USA F40, Tallahassee	Futures	Hard (i)	(United States) JC Aragone	7–5, 3–6, 6–2
Win	4–3	Apr 2017	USA F13, Little Rock	Futures	Hard	(Canada) Philip Bester	7–6^{(7–4)}, 6–1
Win	5–3	May 2017	Nigeria F1, Abuja	Futures	Hard	(Brazil) Fabiano de Paula	7–6^{(7–2)}, 6–4
Loss	5–4	Jan 2018	Playford, Australia	Challenger	Hard	(Australia) Jason Kubler	4–6, 2–6
Loss	5–5	Jan 2019	Newport Beach, USA	Challenger	Hard	(United States) Taylor Fritz	6–7^{(7–9)}, 4–6
Loss	5–6	Jul 2019	Winnipeg, Canada	Challenger	Hard	(Slovakia) Norbert Gombos	6–7^{(3–7)}, 3–6
Loss	5–7	Nov 2019	Charlottesville, USA	Challenger	Hard	(Canada) Vasek Pospisil	6–7^{(2–7)}, 6–3, 2–6

=== Doubles: 6 (4–2) ===
Legend (doubles) ATP Challenger Tour (0–1) ITF Futures Tour (4–1)	Titles by surface Hard (4–2) Clay (0–0) Grass (0–0) Carpet (0–0)

Result	W–L	Date	Tournament	Tier	Surface	Partner	Opponents	Score
Win	1–0	Nov 2013	Mexico F17, Quintana Roo	Futures	Hard	(Canada) Hugo Di Feo	(Puerto Rico) Alex Llompart (New Zealand) Finn Tearney	6–4, 5–7, [10–8]
Loss	1–1	Jun 2014	Canada F3, Richmond	Futures	Hard	(Mexico) Hans Hach	(South Africa) Rik de Voest (United States) Matt Seeberger	7–5, 5–7, [5–10]
Win	2–1	Jul 2014	Canada F5, Saskatoon	Futures	Hard	(Mexico) Hans Hach	(United States) Mousheg Hovhannisyan (United States) Alexander Sarkissian	6–2, 6–3
Win	3–1	Aug 2014	Canada F7, Calgary	Futures	Hard	(United States) Jack Murray	(Bulgaria) Dimitar Kutrovsky (United States) Dennis Nevolo	6–4, 3–6, [10–7]
Win	4–1	Sep 2016	Canada F9, Niagara-on-the-Lake	Futures	Hard (i)	(Canada) Filip Peliwo	(Ecuador) Iván Endara (Chile) Nicolás Jarry	6–3, 6–3
Loss	4–2	Feb 2021	Potchefstroom, South Africa	Challenger	Hard	(Canada) Peter Polansky	(Switzerland) Marc-Andrea Hüsler (Czech Republic) Zdeněk Kolář	4–6, 6–2, [4–10]

== Singles performance timeline ==
Key
W	F	SF	QF	#R	RR	Q#	P#	DNQ	A	Z#	PO	G	S	B	NMS	NTI	P	NH

(W) winner; (F) finalist; (SF) semifinalist; (QF) quarterfinalist; (#R) rounds 4, 3, 2, 1; (RR) round-robin stage; (Q#) qualification round; (P#) preliminary round; (DNQ) did not qualify; (A) absent; (Z#) Davis/Fed Cup Zonal Group (with number indication) or (PO) play-off; (G) gold, (S) silver or (B) bronze Olympic/Paralympic medal; (NMS) not a Masters tournament; (NTI) not a Tier I tournament; (P) postponed; (NH) not held; (SR) strike rate (events won / competed); (W–L) win–loss record.
To avoid confusion and double counting, these charts are updated at the conclusion of a tournament or when the player's participation has ended.

Current through the 2022 Australian Open.

Tournament	2014	2015	2016	2017	2018	2019	2020	2021	2022	2023	SR	W–L
Grand Slam tournaments
Australian Open	A	A	A	A	Q1	Q1	Q2	Q1	Q1	A	0 / 0	0–0
French Open	A	A	A	A	A	A	Q2	Q1	A	A	0 / 0	0–0
Wimbledon	A	A	A	A	Q3	1R	NH	Q2	A	A	0 / 1	0–1
US Open	A	A	A	Q1	A	1R	A	Q1	A		0 / 1	0–1
Win–loss	0–0	0–0	0–0	0–0	0–0	0–2	0–0	0–0	0–0		0 / 2	0–2
National representation
Davis Cup	A	A	A	PO	A	A	RR		A	A	0 / 1	0–3
ATP World Tour Masters 1000
Indian Wells Masters	A	A	A	A	A	A	NH	Q1	A	A	0 / 0	0–0
Miami Open	A	A	A	A	A	A	NH	Q1	A	A	0 / 0	0–0
Canadian Open	1R	Q2	Q1	1R	Q1	1R	NH	1R	A	Q2	0 / 4	0–4
Shanghai Masters	A	A	A	A	A	Q1	NH		A	A	0 / 0	0–0
Win–loss	0–1	0–0	0–0	0–1	0–0	0–1	0–0	0–1	0–0		0 / 4	0–4
Career statistics
Tournaments	1	0	0	1	1	8	1	3	0		15	
Titles	0	0	0	0	0	0	0	0	0		0	
Finals	0	0	0	0	0	1	0	0	0		1	
Overall win–loss	0–1	0–0	0–0	0–3	0–1	4–8	0–1	0–3	0–0		4–17	
Year-end ranking	608	663	545	217	172	106	208	238	909	876	$874,128	
