= 2022 Knoxville Challenger – Doubles =

Doubles
- 2022 Knoxville Challenger

Final
- Champions: (United States) Hunter Reese (United States) Tennys Sandgren
- Runners-up: (United States) Martin Damm (United States) Mitchell Krueger
- Score: 6–7^{(4–7)}, 7–6^{(7–3)}, [10–5]

Events
Singles	Doubles
← 2021 ·	Knoxville Challenger	· 2023 →

Malek Jaziri and Blaž Rola were the defending champions but chose not to defend their title.

Hunter Reese and Tennys Sandgren won the title after defeating Martin Damm and Mitchell Krueger 6–7^{(4–7)}, 7–6^{(7–3)}, [10–5] in the final.

== Seeds ==
1. (United Kingdom) Julian Cash / (United Kingdom) Henry Patten (semifinals)
2. (India) Sriram Balaji / (India) Jeevan Nedunchezhiyan (semifinals)
3. (United States) Alex Lawson / (New Zealand) Artem Sitak (quarterfinals)
4. (France) Théo Arribagé / (United Kingdom) Luke Johnson (first round)

== Draw ==
Key

- Q = Qualifier
- WC = Wild card
- LL = Lucky loser
- Alt = Alternate
- ITF = ITF entry
- PR = Protected ranking
- SR = Special ranking
- SE = Special exempt
- JE = Junior exempt
- JR = Junior Accelerator Programme entrant
- CO = College Accelerator Programme entrant
- NG = Next Gen Accelerator Program entrant
- w/o = Walkover
- r = Retired
- d = Defaulted

First round
1	(United Kingdom) J Cash (United Kingdom) H Patten	4	6	[10]
(Latvia) M Lībietis (Switzerland) L Margaroli	6	0	[4]
(United States) B Shelton (Portugal) D Vale	6	6
(Spain) N Álvarez Varona (United Kingdom) A McHugh	4	4
4	(France) T Arribagé (United Kingdom) L Johnson	3	6	[7]
WC	(Australia) P Harper (Japan) S Mitsui	6	2	[10]
(United States) H Reese (United States) T Sandgren	6^{5}	7	[10]
(Ghana) Abraham Asaba (United States) Ezekiel Clark	7^{7}	5	[5]
(United States) Nathan Ponwith (United States) K Smith	6^{7}	6	[7]
(United States) M Damm (United States) M Krueger	7^{9}	3	[10]
(Germany) S Fanselow (Germany) Lucas Gerch	6	1	[7]
3	(United States) A Lawson (New Zealand) A Sitak	3	6	[10]
Alt	(India) Sathi Reddy Chirala (India) VS Prashanth	4	4
(India) A Chandrasekar (United Kingdom) G Hussey	6	6
WC	(United States) Jack Vance (United States) Tennyson Whiting	6^{3}	3
2	(India) S Balaji (India) J Nedunchezhiyan	7^{7}	6

Quarterfinals
1	(United Kingdom) J Cash (United Kingdom) H Patten	6^{4}	6	[10]
(United States) B Shelton (Portugal) D Vale	7^{7}	2	[3]
WC	(Australia) P Harper (Japan) S Mitsui	4	5
(United States) H Reese (United States) T Sandgren	6	7
(United States) M Damm (United States) M Krueger	3	7^{8}	[13]
3	(United States) A Lawson (New Zealand) A Sitak	6	6^{6}	[11]
(India) A Chandrasekar (United Kingdom) G Hussey	2	7^{8}	[7]
2	(India) S Balaji (India) J Nedunchezhiyan	6	6^{6}	[10]

Semifinals
1	(United Kingdom) J Cash (United Kingdom) H Patten	6^{5}	4
(United States) H Reese (United States) T Sandgren	7^{7}	6
(United States) M Damm (United States) M Krueger	6	6
2	(India) S Balaji (India) J Nedunchezhiyan	2	3

Final
(United States) H Reese (United States) T Sandgren	6^{4}	7^{7}	[10]
(United States) M Damm (United States) M Krueger	7^{7}	6^{3}	[5]
