= 2023 Knoxville Challenger – Doubles =

Doubles
- 2023 Knoxville Challenger

Final
- Champions: (United States) Cannon Kingsley (Venezuela) Luis David Martínez
- Runners-up: (United States) Mac Kiger (United States) Mitchell Krueger
- Score: 7–6^{(7–3)}, 6–3

Events
Singles	Doubles
← 2022 ·	Knoxville Challenger	· 2024 →

Hunter Reese and Tennys Sandgren were the defending champions but only Sandgren chose to defend his title, partnering Marcus Willis. Sandgren lost in the quarterfinals to Evgeny Karlovskiy and Nino Serdarušić.

Cannon Kingsley and Luis David Martínez won the title after defeating Mac Kiger and Mitchell Krueger 7–6^{(7–3)}, 6–3 in the final.

== Seeds ==
1. (United States) Christian Harrison / (Latvia) Miķelis Lībietis (first round)
2. (Mexico) Hans Hach Verdugo / (United States) Alex Lawson (first round)
3. (United States) Mac Kiger / (United States) Mitchell Krueger (final)
4. (United States) Tennys Sandgren / (United Kingdom) Marcus Willis (quarterfinals)

== Draw ==
Key

- Q = Qualifier
- WC = Wild card
- LL = Lucky loser
- Alt = Alternate
- ITF = ITF entry
- PR = Protected ranking
- SR = Special ranking
- SE = Special exempt
- JE = Junior exempt
- JR = Junior Accelerator Programme entrant
- CO = College Accelerator Programme entrant
- NG = Next Gen Accelerator Program entrant
- w/o = Walkover
- r = Retired
- d = Defaulted

First round
1	(United States) C Harrison (Latvia) M Lībietis	4	3
WC	(Japan) S Mitsui (Poland) F Pieczonka	6	6
(Moldova) A Cozbinov (Australia) B Tomic	1	4
WC	(United States) M Damm (United States) A Rybakov	6	6
3	(United States) M Kiger (United States) M Krueger	6	6
(United States) T-S Kwiatkowski (Switzerland) A Ritschard	4	4
(Germany) S Fanselow (Germany) M Rosenkranz	7^{11}	5	[7]
(United Kingdom) A McHugh (United Kingdom) J Monday	6^{9}	7	[10]
(United States) Ezekiel Clark (United States) Tennyson Whiting	6	3	[8]
E Karlovskiy (Croatia) N Serdarušić	4	6	[10]
(United States) A Kovacevic (United States) K Smith	6	2	[7]
4	(United States) T Sandgren (United Kingdom) M Willis	4	6	[10]
(United States) C Kingsley (Venezuela) LD Martínez	6	6
Alt	(United States) Jack Vance (United States) Jamie Vance	1	2
Alt	(France) G Debru (France) Mathis Debru	6	3	[10]
2	(Mexico) H Hach Verdugo (United States) A Lawson	1	6	[7]

Quarterfinals
WC	(Japan) S Mitsui (Poland) F Pieczonka	2	4
WC	(United States) M Damm (United States) A Rybakov	6	6
3	(United States) M Kiger (United States) M Krueger	7^{7}	6^{5}	[10]
(United Kingdom) A McHugh (United Kingdom) J Monday	6^{0}	7^{7}	[7]
E Karlovskiy (Croatia) N Serdarušić	6	6
4	(United States) T Sandgren (United Kingdom) M Willis	4	4
(United States) C Kingsley (Venezuela) LD Martínez	7^{7}	6
Alt	(France) G Debru (France) M Debru	6^{5}	2

Semifinals
WC	(United States) M Damm (United States) A Rybakov	6	4	[8]
3	(United States) M Kiger (United States) M Krueger	4	6	[10]
E Karlovskiy (Croatia) N Serdarušić	4	3
(United States) C Kingsley (Venezuela) LD Martínez	6	6

Final
3	(United States) M Kiger (United States) M Krueger	6^{3}	3
(United States) C Kingsley (Venezuela) LD Martínez	7^{7}	6
