= 2013 Knoxville Challenger – Singles =

Singles
- 2013 Knoxville Challenger

Final
- Champion: (United States) Tim Smyczek
- Runner-up: (Canada) Peter Polansky
- Score: 6–4, 6–2

Events
Singles	Doubles
← 2012 ·	Knoxville Challenger	· 2014 →

Michael Russell was the defending champion, but retired against Tennys Sandgren in the quarterfinals.
Top seed Tim Smyczek won the title defeating unseeded Canadian Peter Polansky in the final.

== Seeds ==
1. (United States) Tim Smyczek (champion)
2. (United States) Denis Kudla (first round)
3. (United States) Jack Sock (first round)
4. (United States) Michael Russell (quarterfinals, retired)
5. (United States) Donald Young (second round)
6. (United States) Ryan Harrison (second round)
7. (United States) Rajeev Ram (first round)
8. (United States) Alex Kuznetsov (quarterfinals)

== Draw ==
=== Key ===
- Q = Qualifier
- WC = Wild card
- LL = Lucky loser
- Alt = Alternate
- SE = Special exempt
- PR = Protected ranking
- ITF = ITF entry
- JE = Junior exempt
- w/o = Walkover
- r = Retired
- d = Defaulted
- SR = Special ranking

=== Finals ===
Semifinals
1	(United States) Tim Smyczek	7	7^{7}
(United States) Tennys Sandgren	5	6^{3}
(Canada) Peter Polansky	4	6	6
Q	(Zimbabwe) Takanyi Garanganga	6	1	3

Final
1	(United States) Tim Smyczek	6	6
(Canada) Peter Polansky	4	2

=== Top half ===
First round
1	(United States) T Smyczek	6	6
LL	(South Africa) F Wolmarans	4	4
(United States) S Johnson	6	6
PR	(France) Laurent Rochette	3	2
(Australia) S Groth	6	6
(Australia) J-P Smith	3	3
(Austria) M Neuchrist	4	3
8	(United States) A Kuznetsov	6	6
4	(United States) M Russell	6	4	6
WC	(United States) J Jenkins	3	6	4
Alt	(United Kingdom) E Corrie	2	6	6
(Dominican Republic) J Hernández	6	2	4
(United States) T Sandgren	6	6
(Ukraine) D Molchanov	3	3
(United States) R Williams
6	(United States) R Harrison	w/o

Second round
1	(United States) T Smyczek	5	7	6
(United States) S Johnson	7	5	4
(Australia) S Groth	6^{0}	6	6^{2}
8	(United States) A Kuznetsov	7^{7}	2	7^{7}
4	(United States) M Russell	6	2	6
Alt	(United Kingdom) E Corrie	4	6	1
(United States) T Sandgren	6	6
6	(United States) R Harrison	4	3

Quarterfinals
1	(United States) T Smyczek	6	6
8	(United States) A Kuznetsov	4	3
4	(United States) M Russell	4	0^{r}
(United States) T Sandgren	6	0

Semifinals
1	(United States) T Smyczek	7	7^{7}
(United States) T Sandgren	5	6^{3}

=== Bottom half ===
First round
5	(United States) D Young	6	6
(India) S Myneni	4	2
(Germany) N Langer	1	4
Q	(India) S Singh	6	6
Alt	(United Kingdom) D Rice	6^{4}	6	7
(United States) A Krajicek	7^{7}	4	5
(Canada) P Polansky	6	7^{7}
3/WC	(United States) J Sock	4	6^{3}
7	(United States) R Ram	2	7^{7}	4
Q	(United States) K King	6	6^{5}	6
Q	(Zimbabwe) T Garanganga	6	6
(Greece) T Angelinos	4	2
Q	(United States) Mitchell Frank	6	6
WC	(Australia) Jarryd Chaplin	4	3
(South Africa) R de Voest	6	7^{8}
2/Alt	(United States) D Kudla	1	6^{6}

Second round
5	(United States) D Young	0	3
Q	(India) S Singh	6	6
Alt	(United Kingdom) D Rice	4	4
(Canada) P Polansky	6	6
Q	(United States) K King	2	4
Q	(Zimbabwe) T Garanganga	6	6
Q	(United States) M Frank
(South Africa) R de Voest	w/o

Quarterfinals
Q	(India) S Singh	3	3
(Canada) P Polansky	6	6
Q	(Zimbabwe) T Garanganga	7^{9}	7^{7}
(South Africa) R de Voest	6^{7}	6^{4}

Semifinals
(Canada) P Polansky	4	6	6
Q	(Zimbabwe) T Garanganga	6	1	3
