= 2016 Knoxville Challenger – Doubles =

Doubles
- 2016 Knoxville Challenger

Final
- Champions: (Canada) Peter Polansky (Canada) Adil Shamasdin
- Runners-up: (Belgium) Ruben Bemelmans (Belgium) Joris De Loore
- Score: 6–1, 6–3

Events
| Singles | Doubles |
- Knoxville Challenger

Johan Brunström and Frederik Nielsen were the defending champions but chose not to defend their title.

Peter Polansky and Adil Shamasdin won the title after defeating Ruben Bemelmans and Joris De Loore 6–1, 6–3 in the final.

== Seeds ==
1. (United States) Brian Baker / (Australia) Sam Groth (semifinals)
2. (Canada) Peter Polansky / (Canada) Adil Shamasdin (champions)
3. (United States) Stefan Kozlov / (United States) Max Schnur (quarterfinals)
4. (Australia) Jarryd Chaplin / (New Zealand) Ben McLachlan (first round)

== Draw ==
Key

- Q = Qualifier
- WC = Wild card
- LL = Lucky loser
- Alt = Alternate
- ITF = ITF entry
- PR = Protected ranking
- SR = Special ranking
- SE = Special exempt
- JE = Junior exempt
- JR = Junior Accelerator Programme entrant
- CO = College Accelerator Programme entrant
- NG = Next Gen Accelerator Program entrant
- w/o = Walkover
- r = Retired
- d = Defaulted

First round
1 | (United States) B Baker (Australia) S Groth | 7 | 6
(United States) M Krueger (United States) E Quigley | 5 | 4
WC | (Australia) Jack Schipanski (Colombia) Luis Valero | 4 | 4
(United States) A Krajicek (United States) T Sandgren | 6 | 6
4 | (Australia) Jarryd Chaplin (New Zealand) B McLachlan | 4 | 4
(United Kingdom) B Klein (South Africa) R Roelofse | 6 | 6
WC | (United States) M Mmoh (United States) H Reese | 2 | 4
(Belgium) R Bemelmans (Belgium) J De Loore | 6 | 6
WC | (United States) B Fratangelo (United States) R Williams
(Latvia) M Lībietis (United States) D Novikov | w/o
(United States) S Bangoura (United States) M McDonald | 4 | 6 | [12]
3 | (United States) S Kozlov (United States) M Schnur | 6 | 4 | [14]
(United Kingdom) E Corrie (United Kingdom) D Evans | 7^{7} | 6
Q | (United Kingdom) L Bambridge (South Africa) T Vorster | 6^{4} | 3
(Republic of Ireland) D O'Hare (United Kingdom) J Salisbury | 3 | 5
2 | (Canada) P Polansky (Canada) A Shamasdin | 6 | 7

Quarterfinals
1 | (United States) B Baker (Australia) S Groth | 6 | 1 | [10]
(United States) A Krajicek (United States) T Sandgren | 2 | 6 | [6]
(United Kingdom) B Klein (South Africa) R Roelofse | 4 | 3
(Belgium) R Bemelmans (Belgium) J De Loore | 6 | 6
(Latvia) M Lībietis (United States) D Novikov | 6 | 6
3 | (United States) S Kozlov (United States) M Schnur | 2 | 3
(United Kingdom) E Corrie (United Kingdom) D Evans | 3 | 4
2 | (Canada) P Polansky (Canada) A Shamasdin | 6 | 6

Semifinals
1 | (United States) B Baker (Australia) S Groth | 6^{5} | 6 | [10]
(Belgium) R Bemelmans (Belgium) J De Loore | 7^{7} | 4 | [12]
(Latvia) M Lībietis (United States) D Novikov | 6^{5} | 3
2 | (Canada) P Polansky (Canada) A Shamasdin | 7^{7} | 6

Final
(Belgium) R Bemelmans (Belgium) J De Loore | 1 | 3
2 | (Canada) P Polansky (Canada) A Shamasdin | 6 | 6
