= 2025 Knoxville Challenger =

- Date: 3–9 November
- Edition: 21st
- Surface: Hard (Indoor)
- Location: Knoxville, United States

Champions

Singles
- (United States) Mitchell Krueger

Doubles
- (Australia) Patrick Harper / (United States) Quinn Vandecasteele
← 2024 ·	Knoxville Challenger	· 2026 →

The 2025 Knoxville Challenger was a professional tennis tournament played on indoor hard courts. It was the 21st edition of the tournament which was part of the 2025 ATP Challenger Tour. It took place in Knoxville, United States between 3 and 9 November 2025.

== Singles main-draw entrants ==
=== Seeds ===
Country	Player	Rank^{1}	Seed
JPN	James Trotter	198	1
GBR	Jay Clarke	203	2
COL	Nicolás Mejía	205	3
~~GBR~~	~~Johannus Monday~~	~~212~~	~~4~~
USA	Mitchell Krueger	242	5
EST	Daniil Glinka	263	6
USA	Alex Rybakov	264	7
USA	Andres Martin	270	8

- ^{1} Rankings are as of October 27, 2025.

=== Other entrants ===
The following players received wildcards into the singles main draw:

- (United States) Andrew Fenty
- (United States) Alexander Kotzen
- (United States) Dominique Rolland

The following player received entry into the singles main draw through the Junior Accelerator programme:

- (South Korea) Roh Ho-young

The following player received entry into the singles main draw as an alternate:

- (United States) Stefan Kozlov

The following players received entry from the qualifying draw:

- (United States) Murphy Cassone
- (Hungary) Péter Makk
- (Japan) Shunsuke Mitsui
- (Portugal) Francisco Rocha
- (India) Dhakshineswar Suresh
- (Germany) Max Wiskandt

The following player received entry as a lucky loser:

- (Sweden) Leo Borg

== Champions ==
=== Singles ===
- (United States) Mitchell Krueger def. (United States) Darwin Blanch 6–7^{(2–7)}, 6–4, 6–1.

=== Doubles ===
- (Australia) Patrick Harper / (United States) Quinn Vandecasteele def. (United States) Mitchell Krueger / (Antigua and Barbuda) Jody Maginley 6–7^{(6–8)}, 7–6^{(7–4)}, [12–10].
