= 2025 Knoxville Challenger – Doubles =

Doubles
- 2025 Knoxville Challenger

Final
- Champions: (Australia) Patrick Harper (United States) Quinn Vandecasteele
- Runners-up: (United States) Mitchell Krueger (Antigua and Barbuda) Jody Maginley
- Score: 6–7^{(6–8)}, 7–6^{(7–4)}, [12–10]

Events
Singles	Doubles
- Knoxville Challenger

Patrick Harper and Johannus Monday were the defending champions but only Harper chose to defend his title, partnering Quinn Vandecasteele. He successfully defended his title after defeating Mitchell Krueger and Jody Maginley 6–7^{(6–8)}, 7–6^{(7–4)}, [12–10] in the final.

== Seeds ==
1. (Canada) Cleeve Harper / (United Kingdom) David Stevenson (semifinals)
2. (Venezuela) Juan José Bianchi / (Mexico) Hans Hach Verdugo (quarterfinals)
3. (United Kingdom) Charles Broom / (United Kingdom) Mark Whitehouse (first round)
4. (United States) Mitchell Krueger / (Antigua and Barbuda) Jody Maginley (final)

== Draw ==
Key

- Q = Qualifier
- WC = Wild card
- LL = Lucky loser
- Alt = Alternate
- ITF = ITF entry
- PR = Protected ranking
- SR = Special ranking
- SE = Special exempt
- JE = Junior exempt
- JR = Junior Accelerator Programme entrant
- CO = College Accelerator Programme entrant
- NG = Next Gen Accelerator Program entrant
- w/o = Walkover
- r = Retired
- d = Defaulted

First round
1	(Canada) C Harper (United Kingdom) D Stevenson	6	6
(Morocco) Y Lalami (Japan) S Mitsui	3	3
Alt	(Austria) Jan Kobierski (United States) Alexander Kotzen	6	6
WC	(United States) J Kennedy (United States) Benjamin Willwerth	4	1
3	(United Kingdom) C Broom (United Kingdom) M Whitehouse	3	6	[5]
(Australia) P Harper (United States) Q Vandecasteele	6	3	[10]
(United States) P Kumar (United States) N Schachter	7^{7}	6^{5}	[10]
(United Kingdom) J Clarke (United Kingdom) T Hands	6^{4}	7^{7}	[8]
(United States) A Perez (United States) Jamie Vance	6^{3}	6	[11]
(Germany) M Rosenkranz (Germany) M Wiskandt	7^{7}	4	[9]
Alt	(United States) Boris Kozlov (United States) S Kozlov	4	3
4	(United States) M Krueger (Antigua and Barbuda) J Maginley	6	6
(United Kingdom) James Hopper (Spain) I Montes de la Torre	7^{7}	6
(United States) Andre Ilagan (United States) K Smith	6^{5}	3
WC	(United States) Woodson McMillin (United States) Ethan Muza	2	4
2	(Venezuela) Juan José Bianchi (Mexico) H Hach Verdugo	6	6

Quarterfinals
1	(Canada) C Harper (United Kingdom) D Stevenson	6	6
Alt	(Austria) J Kobierski (United States) A Kotzen	2	2
(Australia) P Harper (United States) Q Vandecasteele	6	6
(United States) P Kumar (United States) N Schachter	2	4
(United States) A Perez (United States) Jam Vance	5	7^{9}	[2]
4	(United States) M Krueger (Antigua and Barbuda) J Maginley	7	6^{7}	[10]
(United Kingdom) J Hopper (Spain) I Montes de la Torre	6	6
2	(Venezuela) JJ Bianchi (Mexico) H Hach Verdugo	4	4

Semifinals
1	(Canada) C Harper (United Kingdom) D Stevenson	6	3	[8]
(Australia) P Harper (United States) Q Vandecasteele	3	6	[10]
4	(United States) M Krueger (Antigua and Barbuda) J Maginley	w/o
(United Kingdom) J Hopper (Spain) I Montes de la Torre

Final
(Australia) P Harper (United States) Q Vandecasteele	6^{6}	7^{7}	[12]
4	(United States) M Krueger (Antigua and Barbuda) J Maginley	7^{8}	6^{4}	[10]
