= 2012 Knoxville Challenger – Doubles =

Doubles
- 2012 Knoxville Challenger

Final
- Champions: (United States) Alex Kuznetsov (Germany) Mischa Zverev
- Runners-up: (South Africa) Jean Andersen (South Africa) Izak van der Merwe
- Score: 6–4, 6–2

Events
Singles	Doubles
← 2011 ·	Knoxville Challenger	· 2013 →

Steve Johnson and Austin Krajicek were the defending champions but Johnson decided not to participate.
Krajicek played alongside Devin Britton.
Alex Kuznetsov and Mischa Zverev defeated Jean Andersen and Izak van der Merwe 6–4, 6–2 in the final.

== Seeds ==
1. (Australia) John Peers / (Australia) John-Patrick Smith (first round)
2. (Russia) Alex Bogomolov Jr. / (United States) Bobby Reynolds (second round, withdrew due to Bogomolov's injury)
3. (Romania) Andrei Dăescu / (Australia) Adam Hubble (first round)
4. (United States) Devin Britton / (United States) Austin Krajicek (quarterfinals)

== Draw ==
=== Key ===
- Q = Qualifier
- WC = Wild card
- LL = Lucky loser
- Alt = Alternate
- SE = Special exempt
- PR = Protected ranking
- ITF = ITF entry
- JE = Junior exempt
- w/o = Walkover
- r = Retired
- d = Defaulted
- SR = Special ranking

=== Draw ===
First round
1	(Australia) J Peers (Australia) J-P Smith	3	0
(United States) A Kuznetsov (Germany) M Zverev	6	6
(United Kingdom) D Rice (United Kingdom) S Thornley	6	6
Q	(Switzerland) A Bossel (Switzerland) M Lammer	1	3
3	(Romania) A Dăescu (Australia) A Hubble	6	3	[8]
WC	(United States) J Dadamo (United States) N Meister	2	6	[10]
WC	(Australia) Jarryd Chaplin (United States) Hunter Reese	3	4
(United States) B Klahn (United States) D Kudla	6	6
WC	(United States) M Shabaz (United States) J Sock	6	6
(United States) D Courtney (United States) C Harrison	4	4
(United States) T Sandgren (United States) R Williams	3	7^{7}	[7]
4	(United States) D Britton (United States) A Krajicek	6	6^{3}	[10]
(United States) T Smyczek (United States) R Sweeting	3	7^{7}	[7]
(South Africa) Jean Andersen (South Africa) I van der Merwe	6	6^{5}	[10]
(Australia) C Ball (Australia) C Guccione	6^{4}	2
2	(Russia) A Bogomolov Jr. (United States) B Reynolds	7^{7}	6

Quarterfinals
(United States) A Kuznetsov (Germany) M Zverev	6	7^{7}
(United Kingdom) D Rice (United Kingdom) S Thornley	1	6^{2}
WC	(United States) J Dadamo (United States) N Meister	6	6
(United States) B Klahn (United States) D Kudla	1	3
WC	(United States) M Shabaz (United States) J Sock	3	6	[10]
4	(United States) D Britton (United States) A Krajicek	6	4	[7]
(South Africa) J Andersen (South Africa) I van der Merwe	w/o
2	(Russia) A Bogomolov Jr. (United States) B Reynolds

Semifinals
(United States) A Kuznetsov (Germany) M Zverev	4	6	[10]
WC	(United States) J Dadamo (United States) N Meister	6	2	[6]
WC	(United States) M Shabaz (United States) J Sock	6	3	[8]
(South Africa) J Andersen (South Africa) I van der Merwe	2	6	[10]

Final
(United States) A Kuznetsov (Germany) M Zverev	6	6
(South Africa) J Andersen (South Africa) I van der Merwe	4	2
