= 2011 Knoxville Challenger – Doubles =

Doubles
- 2011 Knoxville Challenger

Final
- Champions: (United States) Steve Johnson (United States) Austin Krajicek
- Runners-up: (Australia) Adam Hubble (Denmark) Frederik Nielsen
- Score: 3–6, 6–4, [13–11]

Events
Singles	Doubles
← 2010 ·	Knoxville Challenger	· 2012 →

Rik de Voest and Izak van der Merwe are the defending champions, but lost in the quarterfinals.
Steve Johnson and Austin Krajicek won the title, defeating Adam Hubble and Frederik Nielsen 3–6, 6–4, [13–11] in the final.

== Seeds ==
1. (Germany) Martin Emmrich / (Sweden) Andreas Siljeström (quarterfinals)
2. (United States) John Paul Fruttero / (South Africa) Raven Klaasen (semifinals)
3. (South Africa) Rik de Voest / (South Africa) Izak van der Merwe (quarterfinals)
4. ~~(Finland) Harri Heliövaara / (Ukraine) Denys Molchanov~~ (dq)

== Draw ==
=== Key ===
- Q = Qualifier
- WC = Wild card
- LL = Lucky loser
- Alt = Alternate
- SE = Special exempt
- PR = Protected ranking
- ITF = ITF entry
- JE = Junior exempt
- w/o = Walkover
- r = Retired
- d = Defaulted
- SR = Special ranking

=== Draw ===
First round
1	(Germany) M Emmrich (Sweden) A Siljeström	7^{7}	6
(Belarus) U Ignatik (Russia) D Matsukevich	6^{4}	3
(Australia) A Hubble (Denmark) F Nielsen	7	7
Q	(United States) D Britton (United States) D Kudla	5	5
LL	(Moldova) R Borvanov (Australia) N Roshan	5	3
(Canada) P-L Duclos (Australia) G Jones	7	6
(United States) A Kuznetsov (United States) B Reynolds	5	3
(Chinese Taipei) C-p Hsieh (Chinese Taipei) H-h Lee	7	6
WC	(United States) S Johnson (United States) A Krajicek	6	6
WC	(United States) Benjamin Rogers (Australia) J-P Smith	3	4
(United States) N Monroe (United States) M Yani	5	4
3	(South Africa) R de Voest (South Africa) I van der Merwe	7	6
(Bosnia and Herzegovina) A Delić (Australia) C Guccione	4	6^{6}
WC	(United States) T Sandgren (United States) R Williams	6	7^{8}
(United Kingdom) D Inglot (United States) J Levine	2	4
2	(United States) JP Fruttero (South Africa) R Klaasen	6	6

Quarterfinals
1	(Germany) M Emmrich (Sweden) A Siljeström	3	7	[9]
(Australia) A Hubble (Denmark) F Nielsen	6	5	[11]
(Canada) P-L Duclos (Australia) G Jones	4	6	[7]
(Chinese Taipei) C-p Hsieh (Chinese Taipei) H-h Lee	6	3	[10]
WC	(United States) S Johnson (United States) A Krajicek	7^{7}	7
3	(South Africa) R de Voest (South Africa) I van der Merwe	6^{2}	5
WC	(United States) T Sandgren (United States) R Williams	5	4
2	(United States) JP Fruttero (South Africa) R Klaasen	7	6

Semifinals
(Australia) A Hubble (Denmark) F Nielsen	6	6
(Chinese Taipei) C-p Hsieh (Chinese Taipei) H-h Lee	2	3
WC	(United States) S Johnson (United States) A Krajicek	6	6
2	(United States) JP Fruttero (South Africa) R Klaasen	1	0

Final
(Australia) A Hubble (Denmark) F Nielsen	6	4	[11]
WC	(United States) S Johnson (United States) A Krajicek	3	6	[13]
