= 2026 Knoxville Challenger – Doubles =

Doubles
- 2026 Knoxville Challenger

Final
- Champions: (Netherlands) Jarno Jans (Belgium) Joran Vliegen
- Runners-up: (Ecuador) Andy Andrade (Denmark) Johannes Ingildsen
- Score: 7–5, 6–3

Events
Singles	Doubles
- Knoxville Challenger

Patrick Harper and Quinn Vandecasteele were the defending champions but chose not to defend their title.

Jarno Jans and Joran Vliegen won the title after defeating Andy Andrade and Johannes Ingildsen 7–5, 6–3 in the final.

== Seeds ==
1. (United States) Nathaniel Lammons / (Australia) John-Patrick Smith (semifinals)
2. (Mexico) Miguel Ángel Reyes-Varela / (United States) Reese Stalder (first round)
3. (Netherlands) Jarno Jans / (Belgium) Joran Vliegen (champions)
4. (United States) Trey Hilderbrand / (Romania) Bogdan Pavel (semifinals)

== Draw ==
Key

- Q = Qualifier
- WC = Wild card
- LL = Lucky loser
- Alt = Alternate
- ITF = ITF entry
- PR = Protected ranking
- SR = Special ranking
- SE = Special exempt
- JE = Junior exempt
- JR = Junior Accelerator Programme entrant
- CO = College Accelerator Programme entrant
- NG = Next Gen Accelerator Program entrant
- w/o = Walkover
- r = Retired
- d = Defaulted

First round
1	(United States) N Lammons (Australia) J-P Smith	6	6
(Australia) J Charlton (United Kingdom) B Jones	3	2
(United States) D Milavsky (United States) B Shick	4	6	[4]
(Czech Republic) H Bartoň (Poland) M Kaśnikowski	6	4	[10]
3	(Netherlands) J Jans (Belgium) J Vliegen	6	3	[10]
(United Kingdom) T Hands (United Kingdom) M Summers	4	6	[8]
WC	(United States) K Chopra (United States) A Martin	5	7^{7}	[6]
(Turkey) A Azkara (France) C Chidekh	7	6^{5}	[10]
(Republic of Ireland) C Barry (United Kingdom) Emile Hudd	1	6	[8]
(United Kingdom) G Hussey (United Kingdom) H Wendelken	6	3	[10]
(Canada) J Boulais (Japan) J Trotter	7^{7}	3	[9]
4	(United States) T Hilderbrand (Romania) B Pavel	6^{4}	6	[11]
(Ecuador) A Andrade (Denmark) J Ingildsen	7	3	[10]
(Antigua and Barbuda) J Maginley (United States) K Poling	5	6	[8]
WC	(Guadeloupe) Oscar Lacides (Japan) S Mitsui	7^{9}	6
2	(Mexico) M Reyes-Varela (United States) R Stalder	6^{7}	4

Quarterfinals
1	(United States) N Lammons (Australia) J-P Smith	6	6
(Czech Republic) H Bartoň (Poland) M Kaśnikowski	4	3
3	(Netherlands) J Jans (Belgium) J Vliegen	6	4	[10]
(Turkey) A Azkara (France) C Chidekh	3	6	[8]
(United Kingdom) G Hussey (United Kingdom) H Wendelken	2	6	[8]
4	(United States) T Hilderbrand (Romania) B Pavel	6	1	[10]
(Ecuador) A Andrade (Denmark) J Ingildsen	7	6
WC	(Guadeloupe) O Lacides (Japan) S Mitsui	5	2

Semifinals
1	(United States) N Lammons (Australia) J-P Smith	5	3
3	(Netherlands) J Jans (Belgium) J Vliegen	7	6
4	(United States) T Hilderbrand (Romania) B Pavel	1	2
(Ecuador) A Andrade (Denmark) J Ingildsen	6	6

Final
3	(Netherlands) J Jans (Belgium) J Vliegen	7	6
(Ecuador) A Andrade (Denmark) J Ingildsen	5	3
