= 2016 Knoxville Challenger – Singles =

Singles
- 2016 Knoxville Challenger

Final
- Champion: (United States) Michael Mmoh
- Runner-up: (Canada) Peter Polansky
- Score: 7–5, 2–6, 6–1

Events
| Singles | Doubles |
- Knoxville Challenger

Daniel Evans was the defending champion but lost in the second round to Peter Polansky.

Michael Mmoh won the title after defeating Polansky 7–5, 2–6, 6–1 in the final.

== Seeds ==
1. (United Kingdom) Daniel Evans (second round)
2. (United States) Frances Tiafoe (second round)
3. (United States) Jared Donaldson (semifinals)
4. (United States) Bjorn Fratangelo (first round)
5. (United States) Denis Kudla (first round)
6. (United States) Tim Smyczek (second round)
7. (Switzerland) Henri Laaksonen (first round)
8. (United States) Stefan Kozlov (semifinals)

== Draw ==
Key

- Q = Qualifier
- WC = Wild card
- LL = Lucky loser
- Alt = Alternate
- ITF = ITF entry
- PR = Protected ranking
- SR = Special ranking
- SE = Special exempt
- JE = Junior exempt
- JR = Junior Accelerator Programme entrant
- CO = College Accelerator Programme entrant
- NG = Next Gen Accelerator Program entrant
- w/o = Walkover
- r = Retired
- d = Defaulted

=== Finals ===
Semifinals
(Canada) Peter Polansky | 6 | 6
3 | (United States) Jared Donaldson | 2 | 4
8 | (United States) Stefan Kozlov | 0 | 3
(United States) Michael Mmoh | 6 | 6

Final
(Canada) Peter Polansky | 5 | 6 | 1
(United States) Michael Mmoh | 7 | 2 | 6

=== Top half ===
First round
1 | (United Kingdom) D Evans | 6 | 6
(United States) M Krueger | 2 | 3
(Canada) P Polansky | 6 | 6
Q | (United Kingdom) L Broady | 3 | 4
Q | (United Kingdom) D Cox | 2 | 2
WC | (United States) M McDonald | 6 | 6
(United States) D Novikov | 6 | 3 | 6
5 | (United States) D Kudla | 4 | 6 | 4
3 | (United States) J Donaldson | 6 | 6
WC | (Latvia) M Lībietis | 2 | 4
(United States) S Bangoura | 3 | 6 | 4
WC | (United States) R Williams | 6 | 2 | 6
(Belgium) R Bemelmans | 5 | 7^{7} | 6
(Belgium) J De Loore | 7 | 6^{3} | 4
(United States) N Rubin | 6 | 6
7 | (Switzerland) H Laaksonen | 3 | 3

Second round
1 | (United Kingdom) D Evans | 6 | 6^{5} | 2
(Canada) P Polansky | 1 | 7^{7} | 6
WC | (United States) M McDonald | 6 | 6
(United States) D Novikov | 4 | 1
3 | (United States) J Donaldson | 6 | 7
WC | (United States) R Williams | 4 | 5
(Belgium) R Bemelmans | 6 | 6
(United States) N Rubin | 4 | 4

Quarterfinals
(Canada) P Polansky | 6^{8} | 6 | 5
WC | (United States) M McDonald | 7^{10} | 4 | 1^{r}
3 | (United States) J Donaldson | 6 | 5 | 6
(Belgium) R Bemelmans | 3 | 7 | 4

Semifinals
(Canada) P Polansky | 6 | 6
3 | (United States) J Donaldson | 2 | 4

=== Bottom half ===
First round
8 | (United States) S Kozlov | 6 | 7
Alt | (Republic of Ireland) S Barry | 4 | 5
(United States) T Sandgren | 6 | 6
Q | (United States) Jared Hiltzik | 4 | 3
(United Kingdom) E Corrie | 7^{7} | 2 | 6
WC | (United States) R Sarmiento | 6^{5} | 6 | 4
(Australia) S Groth | 7 | 4 | 6
4 | (United States) B Fratangelo | 5 | 6 | 2
6 | (United States) T Smyczek | 7^{7} | 6
LL | (Netherlands) T van Rijthoven | 6^{2} | 4
Q | (India) Y Bhambri | 4 | 6^{8}
(United States) M Mmoh | 6 | 7^{10}
(United States) B Baker | 6 | 2 | 6^{4}
(United States) A Krajicek | 4 | 6 | 7^{7}
(United Kingdom) B Klein | 6 | 5 | 1
2 | (United States) F Tiafoe | 3 | 7 | 6

Second round
8 | (United States) S Kozlov | 6 | 6
(United States) T Sandgren | 2 | 4
(United Kingdom) E Corrie | 3 | 6 | 7^{7}
(Australia) S Groth | 6 | 3 | 6^{3}
6 | (United States) T Smyczek | 3 | 2
(United States) M Mmoh | 6 | 6
(United States) A Krajicek | 6 | 3 | 6
2 | (United States) F Tiafoe | 3 | 6 | 3

Quarterfinals
8 | (United States) S Kozlov | 6 | 6
(United Kingdom) E Corrie | 4 | 3
(United States) M Mmoh | 6 | 6
(United States) A Krajicek | 4 | 4

Semifinals
8 | (United States) S Kozlov | 0 | 3
(United States) M Mmoh | 6 | 6
