= 2016 Knoxville Challenger =

- Date: 6–13 November
- Edition: 13th
- Surface: Hard
- Location: Knoxville, United States

Champions

Singles
- (United States) Michael Mmoh

Doubles
- (Canada) Peter Polansky / (Canada) Adil Shamasdin
← 2015 ·	Knoxville Challenger	· 2017 →

The 2016 Knoxville Challenger was a professional tennis tournament played on indoor hard courts. It was the thirteenth edition of the tournament which was part of the 2016 ATP Challenger Tour. It took place in Knoxville, United States between 6 and 13 November 2016.

== Singles main-draw entrants ==
=== Seeds ===
Country	Player	Rank^{1}	Seed
GBR	Daniel Evans	61	1
USA	Frances Tiafoe	102	2
USA	Jared Donaldson	109	3
USA	Bjorn Fratangelo	110	4
AUS	Denis Kudla	130	5
USA	Tim Smyczek	133	6
SUI	Henri Laaksonen	134	7
USA	Stefan Kozlov	144	8

- ^{1} Rankings are as of October 31, 2016.

=== Other entrants ===
The following players received wildcards into the singles main draw:

- (Latvia) Miķelis Lībietis
- (United States) Mackenzie McDonald
- (United States) Raymond Sarmiento
- (United States) Rhyne Williams

The following player entered as an alternate:

- (Republic of Ireland) Sam Barry

The following players received entry from the qualifying draw:

- (India) Yuki Bhambri
- (United Kingdom) Liam Broady
- (United Kingdom) Daniel Cox
- (United States) Jared Hiltzik

The following player received entry as a lucky loser:

- (Netherlands) Tim van Rijthoven

== Champions ==
=== Singles ===
- (United States) Michael Mmoh def. (Canada) Peter Polansky, 7–5, 2–6, 6–1.

=== Doubles ===
- (Canada) Peter Polansky / (Canada) Adil Shamasdin def. (Belgium) Ruben Bemelmans / (Belgium) Joris De Loore, 6–1, 6–3.
