= 2011 Knoxville Challenger – Singles =

Singles
- 2011 Knoxville Challenger

Final
- Champion: (United States) Jesse Levine
- Runner-up: (United States) Brian Baker
- Score: 6–2, 6–3

Events
Singles	Doubles
← 2010 ·	Knoxville Challenger	· 2012 →

Kei Nishikori was the defending champion but decided not to participate.
Jesse Levine won the title, defeating Brian Baker 6–2, 6–3 in the final.

== Seeds ==
1. (United States) Michael Russell (quarterfinals)
2. (United States) Bobby Reynolds (first round)
3. (South Africa) Rik de Voest (second round)
4. (South Africa) Izak van der Merwe (second round)
5. (Canada) Vasek Pospisil (quarterfinals)
6. (Belarus) Uladzimir Ignatik (quarterfinals)
7. (United States) Michael Yani (second round)
8. (Australia) Greg Jones (first round)

== Draw ==
=== Key ===
- Q = Qualifier
- WC = Wild card
- LL = Lucky loser
- Alt = Alternate
- SE = Special exempt
- PR = Protected ranking
- ITF = ITF entry
- JE = Junior exempt
- w/o = Walkover
- r = Retired
- d = Defaulted
- SR = Special ranking

=== Finals ===
Semifinals
Alt	(United Kingdom) Jamie Baker	1	7	4
Q	(United States) Brian Baker	6	5	6
SE	(United States) Jesse Levine	7^{7}	6
Q	(Bosnia and Herzegovina) Mirza Bašić	6^{3}	3

Final
Q	(United States) Brian Baker	2	3
SE	(United States) Jesse Levine	6	6

=== Top half ===
First round
1	(United States) M Russell	7^{7}	6
(South Africa) R Klaasen	6^{3}	2
Q	(United States) S Johnson	6^{4}	6	7
(Australia) C Guccione	7^{7}	4	5
Alt	(United Kingdom) J Baker	6	3
(Ukraine) D Molchanov	3	1^{d}
WC	(United States) T Sandgren	4	2
7	(United States) M Yani	6	6
4	(South Africa) I van der Merwe	6	7^{7}
(Dominican Republic) V Estrella	3	6^{5}
(Russia) D Matsukevich	2	2
Q	(United States) B Baker	6	6
WC	(United States) D Kudla	6^{2}	0
(France) V Millot	7^{7}	6
Q	(Bulgaria) D Kutrovsky	4	6^{6}
6	(Belarus) U Ignatik	6	7^{8}

Second round
1	(United States) M Russell	6	7
Q	(United States) S Johnson	4	5
Alt	(United Kingdom) J Baker	6	6^{4}	7^{7}
7	(United States) M Yani	4	7^{7}	6^{4}
4	(South Africa) I van der Merwe	2	3
Q	(United States) B Baker	6	6
(France) V Millot	2	6^{8}
6	(Belarus) U Ignatik	6	7^{10}

Quarterfinals
1	(United States) M Russell	6	1	4
Alt	(United Kingdom) J Baker	3	6	6
Q	(United States) B Baker	4	6	7^{8}
6	(Belarus) U Ignatik	6	3	6^{6}

Semifinals
Alt	(United Kingdom) J Baker	1	7	4
Q	(United States) B Baker	6	5	6

=== Bottom half ===
First round
5	(Canada) V Pospisil	4	6	6
WC	(United States) R Williams	6	1	4
(Denmark) F Nielsen	6	7^{7}
(Moldova) R Borvanov	3	6^{5}
(United States) A Kuznetsov	7^{8}	6^{3}	5
SE	(United States) J Levine	6^{6}	7^{7}	7
(Canada) É Chvojka	3	3
3	(South Africa) R de Voest	6	6
8	(Australia) G Jones	7	4	3
(Finland) H Heliövaara	5	6	6
(South Africa) F Wolmarans	4	6^{4}
Alt	(Canada) P-L Duclos	6	7^{7}
(Bosnia and Herzegovina) A Delić	7	5	6
WC	(Australia) J-P Smith	5	7	3
Q	(Bosnia and Herzegovina) M Bašić	6	6
2	(United States) B Reynolds	3	3

Second round
5	(Canada) V Pospisil	6	6
(Denmark) F Nielsen	1	2
SE	(United States) J Levine	6	6
3	(South Africa) R de Voest	0	2
(Finland) H Heliövaara	7^{7}	7^{9}
Alt	(Canada) P-L Duclos	6^{3}	6^{7}
(Bosnia and Herzegovina) A Delić	6	3	2
Q	(Bosnia and Herzegovina) M Bašić	3	6	6

Quarterfinals
5	(Canada) V Pospisil	5	4
SE	(United States) J Levine	7	6
(Finland) H Heliövaara	3	4
Q	(Bosnia and Herzegovina) M Bašić	6	6

Semifinals
SE	(United States) J Levine	7^{7}	6
Q	(Bosnia and Herzegovina) M Bašić	6^{3}	3
