= 2025 Knoxville Challenger – Singles =

Singles
- 2025 Knoxville Challenger

Final
- Champion: (United States) Mitchell Krueger
- Runner-up: (United States) Darwin Blanch
- Score: 6–7^{(2–7)}, 6–4, 6–1

Events
Singles	Doubles
- Knoxville Challenger

Christopher Eubanks was the defending champion but chose not to defend his title.

Mitchell Krueger won the title after defeating Darwin Blanch 6–7^{(2–7)}, 6–4, 6–1 in the final.

== Seeds ==
1. (Japan) James Trotter (second round)
2. (United Kingdom) Jay Clarke (quarterfinals)
3. (Colombia) Nicolás Mejía (second round)
4. (United Kingdom) Johannus Monday (withdrew)
5. (United States) Mitchell Krueger (champion)
6. (Estonia) Daniil Glinka (semifinals)
7. (United States) Alex Rybakov (first round)
8. (United States) Andres Martin (second round)

== Draw ==
Key

- Q = Qualifier
- WC = Wild card
- LL = Lucky loser
- Alt = Alternate
- ITF = ITF entry
- PR = Protected ranking
- SR = Special ranking
- SE = Special exempt
- JE = Junior exempt
- JR = Junior Accelerator Programme entrant
- CO = College Accelerator Programme entrant
- NG = Next Gen Accelerator Program entrant
- w/o = Walkover
- r = Retired
- d = Defaulted

=== Finals ===
Semifinals
5	(United States) Mitchell Krueger	6	6
(Germany) Cedrik-Marcel Stebe	4	1
6	(Estonia) Daniil Glinka	4	6^{2}
(United States) Darwin Blanch	6	7^{7}

Final
5	(United States) Mitchell Krueger	6^{2}	6	6
(United States) Darwin Blanch	7^{7}	4	1

=== Top half ===
First round
1	(Japan) J Trotter	6	1	7^{7}
(United Kingdom) C Broom	4	6	6^{4}
(Germany) M Rosenkranz	1	0^{r}
(Spain) I Montes de la Torre	6	2
(Georgia (country)) S Purtseladze	2	2
(France) A Ghibaudo	6	6
JR	(South Korea) Roh Ho-young	2	3
5	(United States) M Krueger	6	6
3	(Colombia) N Mejía	6	7
(Greece) A Thanos	4	5
(Chile) M Soto	3	2
Q	(United States) M Cassone	6	6
(United States) Andre Ilagan	6	3	6^{6}
(United Kingdom) O Tarvet	3	6	7^{8}
(Germany) C-M Stebe	6^{5}	7^{7}	6
7	(United States) A Rybakov	7^{7}	6^{2}	0

Second round
1	(Japan) J Trotter	6^{3}	6^{6}
(Spain) I Montes de la Torre	7^{7}	7^{8}
(France) A Ghibaudo	2	1
5	(United States) M Krueger	6	6
3	(Colombia) N Mejía	3	7	3
Q	(United States) M Cassone	6	5	6
(United Kingdom) O Tarvet	3	6^{5}
(Germany) C-M Stebe	6	7^{7}

Quarterfinals
(Spain) I Montes de la Torre	5	4
5	(United States) M Krueger	7	6
Q	(United States) M Cassone	6^{13}	3
(Germany) C-M Stebe	7^{15}	6

Semifinals
5	(United States) M Krueger	6	6
(Germany) C-M Stebe	4	1

=== Bottom half ===
First round
6	(Estonia) D Glinka	6	6
Q	(Hungary) Péter Makk	2	4
(United States) A Perez	6	6
WC	(United States) A Fenty	4	3
Q	(Japan) S Mitsui	7^{7}	7^{7}
Q	(India) D Suresh	6^{3}	6^{0}
Q	(Germany) M Wiskandt	4	6	6
LL	(Sweden) L Borg	6	1	2
8	(United States) A Martin	6	6
(United States) T Zink	3	2
WC	(United States) Alexander Kotzen	4	2
(United States) Dar Blanch	6	6
Alt	(United States) S Kozlov	7^{7}	2	6
WC	(United States) Dominique Rolland	6^{1}	6	1
Q	(Portugal) Francisco Rocha	1	4
2	(United Kingdom) J Clarke	6	6

Second round
6	(Estonia) D Glinka	6	6
(United States) A Perez	3	4
Q	(Japan) S Mitsui	6	6^{3}	6
Q	(Germany) M Wiskandt	1	7^{7}	2
8	(United States) A Martin	4	4
(United States) Dar Blanch	6	6
Alt	(United States) S Kozlov	2	6	3
2	(United Kingdom) J Clarke	6	2	6

Quarterfinals
6	(Estonia) D Glinka	7	6
Q	(Japan) S Mitsui	5	3
(United States) Dar Blanch	6	7^{7}
2	(United Kingdom) J Clarke	3	6^{5}

Semifinals
6	(Estonia) D Glinka	4	6^{2}
(United States) Dar Blanch	6	7^{7}
