= 2022 Knoxville Challenger – Singles =

Singles
- 2022 Knoxville Challenger

Final
- Champion: (United States) Ben Shelton
- Runner-up: (United States) Christopher Eubanks
- Score: 6–3, 1–6, 7–6^{(7–4)}

Events
Singles	Doubles
← 2021 ·	Knoxville Challenger	· 2023 →

Christopher Eubanks was the defending champion but lost in the final to Ben Shelton.

Shelton won the title after defeating Eubanks 6–3, 1–6, 7–6^{(7–4)} in the final.

== Seeds ==
1. (United States) Michael Mmoh (semifinals)
2. (United States) Stefan Kozlov (quarterfinals)
3. (United States) Christopher Eubanks (final)
4. (United States) Ben Shelton (champion)
5. (United States) Emilio Nava (first round)
6. (United States) Aleksandar Kovacevic (quarterfinals)
7. (France) Enzo Couacaud (semifinals)
8. (China) Shang Juncheng (first round)

== Draw ==
=== Key ===
- Q = Qualifier
- WC = Wild card
- LL = Lucky loser
- Alt = Alternate
- SE = Special exempt
- PR = Protected ranking
- ITF = ITF entry
- JE = Junior exempt
- w/o = Walkover
- r = Retired
- d = Defaulted
- SR = Special ranking

=== Finals ===
Semifinals
1	(United States) Michael Mmoh	7^{7}	5	2
3	(United States) Christopher Eubanks	6^{2}	7	6
4	(United States) Ben Shelton	6^{3}	6	6
7	(France) Enzo Couacaud	7^{7}	4	4

Final
3	(United States) Christopher Eubanks	3	6	6^{4}
4	(United States) Ben Shelton	6	1	7^{7}

=== Top half ===
First round
1	(United States) M Mmoh	6	6
Q	(United States) Alexander Bernard	0	0
(United States) U Blanch	6	3	7
Q	(United States) Tristan McCormick	3	6	5
(Australia) A Walton	4	6	3
(United States) Z Svajda	6	4	6
(United States) T Sandgren	7^{8}	6
5	(United States) Em Nava	6^{6}	3
3	(United States) C Eubanks	6	6
(Spain) N Álvarez Varona	4	2
Q	(United States) S Kirchheimer	6	6
WC	(United States) Gage Brymer	3	1
(United Kingdom) P Jubb	6	3	7^{19}
(United States) E Escobedo	4	6	6^{17}
(Germany) Lucas Gerch	6	7^{7}
8	(China) J Shang	4	6^{3}

Second round
1	(United States) M Mmoh	7	6
(United States) U Blanch	5	3
(United States) Z Svajda	1	2
(United States) T Sandgren	6	6
3	(United States) C Eubanks	7^{7}	6
Q	(United States) S Kirchheimer	6^{2}	4
(United Kingdom) P Jubb	7	6^{2}	4
(Germany) L Gerch	5	7^{7}	6

Quarterfinals
1	(United States) M Mmoh	6	6
(United States) T Sandgren	3	4
3	(United States) C Eubanks	6	6
(Germany) L Gerch	3	2

Semifinals
1	(United States) M Mmoh	7^{7}	5	2
3	(United States) C Eubanks	6^{2}	7	6

=== Bottom half ===
First round
6	(United States) A Kovacevic	7^{7}	4	7^{7}
Alt	(United States) E Quinn	6^{2}	6	6^{5}
(Germany) S Fanselow	6	1	4
Q	(Spain) I Montes de la Torre	3	6	6
Q	(United Kingdom) G Hussey	6^{1}	1
(United States) M Krueger	7^{7}	6
(United States) K Smith	6	4	3
4	(United States) B Shelton	4	6	6
7	(France) E Couacaud	7^{7}	6
(United States) Ezekiel Clark	6^{5}	3
(United Kingdom) A McHugh	6	7^{10}
Q	(United States) C Kingsley	2	6^{8}
(India) P Gunneswaran	6	6
WC	(Jamaica) B Bicknell	1	2
WC	(United States) M Damm	7^{9}	3	2
2	(United States) S Kozlov	6^{7}	6	6

Second round
6	(United States) A Kovacevic	6	6
Q	(Spain) I Montes de la Torre	1	4
(United States) M Krueger	2	1
4	(United States) B Shelton	6	6
7	(France) E Couacaud	6	6
(United Kingdom) A McHugh	4	2
(India) P Gunneswaran	4	3
2	(United States) S Kozlov	6	6

Quarterfinals
6	(United States) A Kovacevic	5	4
4	(United States) B Shelton	7	6
7	(France) E Couacaud	6	7
2	(United States) S Kozlov	3	5

Semifinals
4	(United States) B Shelton	6^{3}	6	6
7	(France) E Couacaud	7^{7}	4	4
