= 2023 Knoxville Challenger – Singles =

Singles
- 2023 Knoxville Challenger

Final
- Champion: (United States) Alex Michelsen
- Runner-up: (United States) Denis Kudla
- Score: 7–5, 4–6, 6–2

Events
Singles	Doubles
← 2022 ·	Knoxville Challenger	· 2024 →

Ben Shelton was the defending champion but chose not to defend his title.

Alex Michelsen won the title after defeating Denis Kudla 7–5, 4–6, 6–2 in the final.

== Seeds ==
1. (United States) Michael Mmoh (first round)
2. (United States) Aleksandar Kovacevic (first round)
3. (United States) Alex Michelsen (champion)
4. (United States) Zachary Svajda (quarterfinals)
5. (United States) Emilio Nava (semifinals)
6. (France) Titouan Droguet (first round)
7. (Australia) Adam Walton (withdrew)
8. (China) Shang Juncheng (first round)

== Draw ==
=== Key ===
- Q = Qualifier
- WC = Wild card
- LL = Lucky loser
- Alt = Alternate
- SE = Special exempt
- PR = Protected ranking
- ITF = ITF entry
- JE = Junior exempt
- w/o = Walkover
- r = Retired
- d = Defaulted
- SR = Special ranking

=== Finals ===
Semifinals
(United States) Denis Kudla	5	6	6
5	(United States) Emilio Nava	7	4	1
3	(United States) Alex Michelsen	6	2	6
(United States) Tennys Sandgren	2	6	4

Final
(United States) Denis Kudla	5	6	2
3	(United States) Alex Michelsen	7	4	6

=== Top half ===
First round
1	(United States) M Mmoh	4	3
(United States) M Damm	6	6
(United States) D Kudla	6^{5}	6	6
(United States) P Kypson	7^{7}	3	4
Q	(United States) T-S Kwiatkowski	6^{5}	6	6
WC	(United States) S Kirchheimer	7^{7}	2	4
(United Kingdom) A McHugh	3	7	6
LL	(Moldova) A Cozbinov	6	5	3
4	(United States) Z Svajda	6	6
SE	(United States) A Mayo	3	4
Q	(Germany) S Fanselow	6	6
Q	(United States) C Kingsley	4	2
LL	(United States) C Harrison	1	4
Q	(United States) M Cassone	6	6
(Croatia) N Serdarušić	4	4
5	(United States) Em Nava	6	6

Second round
(United States) M Damm	6^{4}	3
(United States) D Kudla	7^{7}	6
Q	(United States) T-S Kwiatkowski	6	4	3
(United Kingdom) A McHugh	0	6	6
4	(United States) Z Svajda	6	7
Q	(Germany) S Fanselow	2	5
Q	(United States) M Cassone	4	4
5	(United States) Em Nava	6	6

Quarterfinals
(United States) D Kudla	6	7^{7}
(United Kingdom) A McHugh	3	6^{5}
4	(United States) Z Svajda	4	4
5	(United States) Em Nava	6	6

Semifinals
(United States) D Kudla	5	6	6
5	(United States) Em Nava	7	4	1

=== Bottom half ===
First round
6	(France) T Droguet	4	1
(Kazakhstan) B Zhukayev	6	6
Q	(Germany) M Rosenkranz	6	2	5
WC	(United States) N Basavareddy	4	6	7
WC	(United Kingdom) J Monday	6	5	3
(France) G Debru	4	7	6
(Australia) B Tomic	6	6^{5}	4
3	(United States) A Michelsen	4	7^{7}	6
8	(China) J Shang	6	6^{9}	2
(Switzerland) A Ritschard	3	7^{11}	6
Q	E Karlovskiy	5	2
(United States) M Krueger	7	6
(United States) T Sandgren	4	7^{8}	7^{7}
(United States) E Quinn	6	6^{6}	6^{3}
(United States) B Holt	6	3	7^{7}
2	(United States) A Kovacevic	4	6	6^{1}

Second round
(Kazakhstan) B Zhukayev	4	2
WC	(United States) N Basavareddy	6	6
(France) G Debru	3	6	4
3	(United States) A Michelsen	6	3	6
(Switzerland) A Ritschard	6	6
(United States) M Krueger	2	4
(United States) T Sandgren	6	7
(United States) B Holt	3	5

Quarterfinals
WC	(United States) N Basavareddy	3	3
3	(United States) A Michelsen	6	6
(Switzerland) A Ritschard	6^{9}	4
(United States) T Sandgren	7^{11}	6

Semifinals
3	(United States) A Michelsen	6	2	6
(United States) T Sandgren	2	6	4
