= 2015 Knoxville Challenger – Doubles =

Doubles
- 2015 Knoxville Challenger

Final
- Champion: (Sweden) Johan Brunström (Denmark) Frederik Nielsen
- Runner-up: (United States) Sekou Bangoura (United States) Matt Seeberger
- Score: 6–1, 6–2

Events
Singles	Doubles
- Knoxville Challenger

Johan Brunström and Frederik Nielsen won the title, defeating Sekou Bangoura and Matt Seeberger in the final 6–1, 6–2 .

== Seeds ==
1. (United States) Austin Krajicek / (United States) Nicholas Monroe (quarterfinals)
2. (South Africa) Dean O'Brien / (South Africa) Ruan Roelofse (quarterfinals)
3. (Sweden) Johan Brunström / (Denmark) Frederik Nielsen (champions)
4. (Mexico) Hans Hach Verdugo / (Mexico) Miguel Ángel Reyes-Varela (semifinals)

== Draw ==
Key

- Q = Qualifier
- WC = Wild card
- LL = Lucky loser
- Alt = Alternate
- ITF = ITF entry
- PR = Protected ranking
- SR = Special ranking
- SE = Special exempt
- JE = Junior exempt
- JR = Junior Accelerator Programme entrant
- CO = College Accelerator Programme entrant
- NG = Next Gen Accelerator Program entrant
- w/o = Walkover
- r = Retired
- d = Defaulted

=== Draw ===
First round
1	(United States) A Krajicek (United States) N Monroe	4	7^{7}	[11]
(Colombia) A Falla (Ecuador) G Lapentti	6	6^{4}	[9]
Q	(Switzerland) H Laaksonen (Switzerland) L Margaroli	2	7	[6]
(United States) S Bangoura (United States) M Seeberger	6	5	[10]
4	(Mexico) H Hach Verdugo (Mexico) MÁ Reyes-Varela	7	6
WC	(United States) T Harry Fritz (United States) H Reese	5	4
WC	(United States) R Opelka (United States) T Paul	4	7	[12]
WC	(Australia) Jarryd Chaplin (United States) T Sandgren	6	5	[10]
(Canada) P Polansky (Canada) A Shamasdin	7^{7}	6
(Slovenia) B Kavčič (Czech Republic) M Michalička	6^{3}	2
(Australia) J Duckworth (Germany) M Zverev	4	4
3	(Sweden) J Brunström (Denmark) F Nielsen	6	6
(United States) D Novikov (United States) E Quigley	6	7^{7}
(Republic of Ireland) D O'Hare (United Kingdom) J Salisbury	4	6^{2}
(Philippines) R Gonzales (United States) D Nguyen	6^{4}	3
2	(South Africa) D O'Brien (South Africa) R Roelofse	7^{7}	6

Quarterfinals
1	(United States) A Krajicek (United States) N Monroe	4	4
(United States) S Bangoura (United States) M Seeberger	6	6
4	(Mexico) H Hach Verdugo (Mexico) MÁ Reyes-Varela	2	6	[14]
WC	(United States) R Opelka (United States) T Paul	6	3	[12]
(Canada) P Polansky (Canada) A Shamasdin	1	5
3	(Sweden) J Brunström (Denmark) F Nielsen	6	7
(United States) D Novikov (United States) E Quigley	6	7^{8}
2	(South Africa) D O'Brien (South Africa) R Roelofse	4	6^{6}

Semifinals
(United States) S Bangoura (United States) M Seeberger	6	4	[10]
4	(Mexico) H Hach Verdugo (Mexico) MÁ Reyes-Varela	4	6	[7]
3	(Sweden) J Brunström (Denmark) F Nielsen	6	6
(United States) D Novikov (United States) E Quigley	2	3

Final
(United States) S Bangoura (United States) M Seeberger	1	2
3	(Sweden) J Brunström (Denmark) F Nielsen	6	6
