= 2021 Knoxville Challenger =

- Date: 8–14 November
- Edition: 17th
- Surface: Hard (Indoor)
- Location: Knoxville, United States

Champions

Singles
- (United States) Christopher Eubanks

Doubles
- (Tunisia) Malek Jaziri / (Slovenia) Blaž Rola
← 2019 ·	Knoxville Challenger	· 2022 →

The 2021 Knoxville Challenger was a professional tennis tournament played on indoor hard courts. It was the seventeenth edition of the tournament which was part of the 2021 ATP Challenger Tour. It took place in Knoxville, United States between 8 and 14 November 2021.

== Singles main-draw entrants ==
=== Seeds ===
Country	Player	Rank^{1}	Seed
USA	Tennys Sandgren	93	1
GER	Daniel Altmaier	106	2
CAN	Vasek Pospisil	113	3
USA	Mitchell Krueger	148	4
USA	Jack Sock	153	5
USA	J. J. Wolf	159	6
KAZ	Dmitry Popko	171	7
USA	Bjorn Fratangelo	172	8

- ^{1} Rankings are as of November 1, 2021.

=== Other entrants ===
The following players received wildcards into the singles main draw:

- (United States) Aleksandar Kovacevic
- (United States) Emilio Nava
- (Australia) Adam Walton

The following player received entry into the singles main draw using a protected ranking:

- (Japan) Tatsuma Ito

The following players received entry into the singles main draw as alternates:

- (United States) Christian Harrison
- (Tunisia) Malek Jaziri
- (Canada) Peter Polansky

The following players received entry from the qualifying draw:

- (United States) JC Aragone
- (Netherlands) Gijs Brouwer
- (United Kingdom) Aidan McHugh
- (United States) Donald Young

== Champions ==
=== Singles ===
- (United States) Christopher Eubanks def. (Germany) Daniel Altmaier 6–3, 6–4.

=== Doubles ===
- (Tunisia) Malek Jaziri / (Slovenia) Blaž Rola def. (Mexico) Hans Hach Verdugo / (Mexico) Miguel Ángel Reyes-Varela 3–6, 6–3, [10–5].
