= 2015 Knoxville Challenger – Singles =

Singles
- 2015 Knoxville Challenger

Final
- Champion: (United Kingdom) Daniel Evans
- Runner-up: (United States) Frances Tiafoe
- Score: 5–7, 6–1, 6–3

Events
| Singles | Doubles |
- Knoxville Challenger

Adrian Mannarino was the defending champion, but chose not to compete this year.

Daniel Evans won the title, defeating Frances Tiafoe in the final 5–7, 6–1, 6–3 .

== Seeds ==
1. (Tunisia) Malek Jaziri (first round)
2. (United States) Austin Krajicek (second round)
3. (United States) Tim Smyczek (second round)
4. (United States) Ryan Harrison (first round)
5. (Australia) James Duckworth (quarterfinals)
6. (Australia) John-Patrick Smith (second round)
7. (Colombia) Alejandro Falla (first round)
8. (Slovenia) Blaž Rola (second round)

== Draw ==
Key

- Q = Qualifier
- WC = Wild card
- LL = Lucky loser
- Alt = Alternate
- ITF = ITF entry
- PR = Protected ranking
- SR = Special ranking
- SE = Special exempt
- JE = Junior exempt
- JR = Junior Accelerator Programme entrant
- CO = College Accelerator Programme entrant
- NG = Next Gen Accelerator Program entrant
- w/o = Walkover
- r = Retired
- d = Defaulted

=== Finals ===
Semifinals
(United States) Dennis Novikov | 4 | 4
(United States) Frances Tiafoe | 6 | 6
(United States) Jared Donaldson | 3 | 4
(United Kingdom) Daniel Evans | 6 | 6

Final
(United States) Frances Tiafoe | 7 | 1 | 3
(United Kingdom) Daniel Evans | 5 | 6 | 6

=== Top half ===
First round
1 | (Tunisia) M Jaziri | 1 | 2
WC | (United States) S Kozlov | 6 | 6
Q | (United Kingdom) D Smethurst | 5 | 5
(United States) D Novikov | 7 | 7
WC | (United States) M McDonald | 4 | 3
Q | (United States) S Bangoura | 6 | 6
(Denmark) F Nielsen | 6^{2} | 4
5 | (Australia) J Duckworth | 7^{7} | 6
4 | (United States) R Harrison | 2 | 4
(Slovenia) B Kavčič | 6 | 6
WC | (Colombia) Luis Valero | 6 | 1 | 3
(United States) F Tiafoe | 3 | 6 | 6
(Czech Republic) M Michalička | 1 | 3
(United States) T Sandgren | 6 | 6
(Ecuador) G Lapentti | 6 | 3 | 4
8 | (Slovenia) B Rola | 4 | 6 | 6

Second round
WC | (United States) S Kozlov | 3 | 6^{4}
(United States) D Novikov | 6 | 7^{7}
Q | (United States) S Bangoura | 6 | 3 | 4
5 | (Australia) J Duckworth | 4 | 6 | 6
(Slovenia) B Kavčič | 4 | 6 | 1
(United States) F Tiafoe | 6 | 4 | 6
(United States) T Sandgren | 6 | 3 | 6
8 | (Slovenia) B Rola | 4 | 6 | 3

Quarterfinals
(United States) D Novikov | 7 | 6
5 | (Australia) J Duckworth | 5 | 4
(United States) F Tiafoe | 6 | 3
(United States) T Sandgren | 2 | 0^{r}

Semifinals
(United States) D Novikov | 4 | 4
(United States) F Tiafoe | 6 | 6

=== Bottom half ===
First round
7 | (Colombia) A Falla | 6^{5} | 6^{5}
(United Kingdom) L Broady | 7^{7} | 7^{7}
WC | (United States) H Reese | 1 | 0
(Germany) M Zverev | 6 | 6
(United States) J Donaldson | 6 | 4 | 6
Q | (United States) E Quigley | 4 | 6 | 4
SE | (United States) T Paul | 4 | 4
3 | (United States) T Smyczek | 6 | 6
6 | (Australia) J-P Smith | 6 | 6
(United States) T Fritz | 4 | 4
Q | (Switzerland) A Bossel | 6^{6} | 6^{11}
(United States) B Fratangelo | 7^{8} | 7^{13}
(United States) D Nguyen | 2 | 6 | 3
(United Kingdom) D Evans | 6 | 2 | 6
SE | (United States) N Rubin | 5 | 3
2 | (United States) A Krajicek | 7 | 6

Second round
(United Kingdom) L Broady | 6 | 2 | 6
(Germany) M Zverev | 3 | 6 | 3
(United States) J Donaldson | 7 | 7^{8}
3 | (United States) T Smyczek | 5 | 6^{6}
6 | (Australia) J-P Smith | 6^{4} | 4
(United States) B Fratangelo | 7^{7} | 6
(United Kingdom) D Evans | 6 | 6
2 | (United States) A Krajicek | 3 | 2

Quarterfinals
(United Kingdom) L Broady | 4 | 4
(United States) J Donaldson | 6 | 6
(United States) B Fratangelo | 4 | 6^{4}
(United Kingdom) D Evans | 6 | 7^{7}

Semifinals
(United States) J Donaldson | 3 | 4
(United Kingdom) D Evans | 6 | 6
