= 2023 Knoxville Challenger =

- Date: 6–12 November
- Edition: 19th
- Surface: Hard (Indoor)
- Location: Knoxville, United States

Champions

Singles
- (United States) Alex Michelsen

Doubles
- (United States) Cannon Kingsley / (Venezuela) Luis David Martínez
← 2022 ·	Knoxville Challenger	· 2024 →

The 2023 Knoxville Challenger was a professional tennis tournament played on indoor hard courts. It was the 19th edition of the tournament which was part of the 2023 ATP Challenger Tour. It took place in Knoxville, United States between 6 and 12 November 2023.

== Singles main-draw entrants ==
=== Seeds ===
Country	Player	Rank^{1}	Seed
USA	Michael Mmoh	101	1
USA	Aleksandar Kovacevic	109	2
USA	Alex Michelsen	112	3
USA	Zachary Svajda	143	4
USA	Emilio Nava	148	5
FRA	Titouan Droguet	166	6
~~AUS~~	~~Adam Walton~~	~~174~~	~~7~~
CHN	Shang Juncheng	176	8

- ^{1} Rankings are as of October 30, 2023.

=== Other entrants ===
The following players received wildcards into the singles main draw:

- (United States) Nishesh Basavareddy
- (United States) Strong Kirchheimer
- (United Kingdom) Johannus Monday

The following player received entry into the singles main draw as a special exempt:

- (United States) Aidan Mayo

The following players received entry from the qualifying draw:

- (United States) Murphy Cassone
- (Germany) Sebastian Fanselow
- Evgeny Karlovskiy
- (United States) Cannon Kingsley
- (United States) Thai-Son Kwiatkowski
- (Germany) Mats Rosenkranz

The following players received entry as lucky losers:

- (Moldova) Alexander Cozbinov
- (United States) Christian Harrison

== Champions ==
=== Singles ===
- (United States) Alex Michelsen def. (United States) Denis Kudla 7–5, 4–6, 6–2.

=== Doubles ===
- (United States) Cannon Kingsley / (Venezuela) Luis David Martínez def. (United States) Mac Kiger / (United States) Mitchell Krueger 7–6^{(7–3)}, 6–3.
