= 2013 Knoxville Challenger =

- Date: 4–10 November
- Edition: 10th
- Surface: Hard
- Location: Knoxville, United States

Champions

Singles
- (United States) Tim Smyczek

Doubles
- (Australia) Samuel Groth / (Australia) John-Patrick Smith
← 2012 ·	Knoxville Challenger	· 2014 →

The 2013 Knoxville Challenger was a professional tennis tournament played on hard courts. It was the tenth edition of the tournament which was part of the 2013 ATP Challenger Tour. It took place in Knoxville, United States between 4 and 10 November 2013.

== Singles main-draw entrants ==
=== Seeds ===
Country	Player	Rank^{1}	Seed
USA	Tim Smyczek	83	1
USA	Denis Kudla	90	2
USA	Jack Sock	94	3
USA	Michael Russell	96	4
USA	Donald Young	104	5
USA	Ryan Harrison	105	6
USA	Rajeev Ram	120	7
USA	Alex Kuznetsov	121	8

- ^{1} Rankings are as of October 28, 2013.

=== Other entrants ===
The following players received wildcards into the singles main draw:

- (Australia) Jarryd Chaplin
- (United States) Jarmere Jenkins
- (United States) Jack Sock

The following players used protected ranking into the singles main draw:

- (France) Laurent Rochette

The following players received entry as an alternate into the singles main draw:

- (United Kingdom) Edward Corrie
- (United States) Denis Kudla
- (United Kingdom) David Rice

The following players received entry from the qualifying draw:

- (United States) Mitchell Frank
- (Zimbabwe) Takanyi Garanganga
- (United States) Kevin King
- (India) Sanam Singh

The following players received entry into the singles main draw as lucky losers:

- (South Africa) Fritz Wolmarans

== Champions ==
=== Singles ===
- (United States) Tim Smyczek def. (Canada) Peter Polansky 6–4, 6–2

=== Doubles ===
- (Australia) Samuel Groth / (Australia) John-Patrick Smith def. (Australia) Carsten Ball / (Canada) Peter Polansky 6–7^{(6–8)}, 6–2, [10–7]
