= 2022 Knoxville Challenger =

- Date: 7–13 November
- Edition: 18th
- Surface: Hard (Indoor)
- Location: Knoxville, United States

Champions

Singles
- (United States) Ben Shelton

Doubles
- (United States) Hunter Reese / (United States) Tennys Sandgren
← 2021 ·	Knoxville Challenger	· 2023 →

The 2022 Knoxville Challenger was a professional tennis tournament played on indoor hard courts. It was the 18th edition of the tournament which was part of the 2022 ATP Challenger Tour. It took place in Knoxville, United States between 7 and 13 November 2022.

== Singles main-draw entrants ==
=== Seeds ===
Country	Player	Rank^{1}	Seed
USA	Michael Mmoh	120	1
USA	Stefan Kozlov	132	2
USA	Christopher Eubanks	135	3
USA	Ben Shelton	156	4
USA	Emilio Nava	174	5
USA	Aleksandar Kovacevic	178	6
FRA	Enzo Couacaud	186	7
CHN	Shang Juncheng	195	8

- ^{1} Rankings are as of October 31, 2022.

=== Other entrants ===
The following players received wildcards into the singles main draw:

- (Jamaica) Blaise Bicknell
- (United States) Gage Brymer
- (United States) Martin Damm

The following player received entry into the singles main draw as an alternate:

- (United States) Ethan Quinn

The following players received entry from the qualifying draw:

- (United States) Alexander Bernard
- (United Kingdom) Giles Hussey
- (United States) Cannon Kingsley
- (United States) Strong Kirchheimer
- (United States) Tristan McCormick
- (Spain) Iñaki Montes de la Torre

== Champions ==
=== Singles ===
- (United States) Ben Shelton def. (United States) Christopher Eubanks 6–3, 1–6, 7–6^{(7–4)}.

=== Doubles ===
- (United States) Hunter Reese / (United States) Tennys Sandgren def. (United States) Martin Damm / (United States) Mitchell Krueger 6–7^{(4–7)}, 7–6^{(7–3)}, [10–5].
