= 2010 Knoxville Challenger – Doubles =

Doubles
- 2010 Knoxville Challenger

Final
- Champions: (South Africa) Rik de Voest (South Africa) Izak van der Merwe
- Runners-up: (United States) Alex Bogomolov Jr. (United States) Alex Kuznetsov
- Score: 6–1, 6–4

Events
Singles	Doubles
- Knoxville Challenger

Martin Emmrich and Andreas Siljeström were the defending champions, but they chose to not compete this year.
Third seeds Rik de Voest and Izak van der Merwe won in the final 6–1, 6–4, against Alex Bogomolov Jr. and Alex Kuznetsov.

== Seeds ==
1. (Australia) Carsten Ball / (United States) Travis Rettenmaier (first round)
2. (Australia) Stephen Huss / (Australia) Peter Luczak (quarterfinals)
3. (South Africa) Rik de Voest / (South Africa) Izak van der Merwe (champions)
4. (United States) Ryler DeHeart / (Canada) Pierre-Ludovic Duclos (first round)

== Draw ==
Key

- Q = Qualifier
- WC = Wild card
- LL = Lucky loser
- Alt = Alternate
- ITF = ITF entry
- PR = Protected ranking
- SR = Special ranking
- SE = Special exempt
- JE = Junior exempt
- JR = Junior Accelerator Programme entrant
- CO = College Accelerator Programme entrant
- NG = Next Gen Accelerator Program entrant
- w/o = Walkover
- r = Retired
- d = Defaulted

=== Draw ===
First round
1	(Australia) C Ball (United States) T Rettenmaier	6	3	[9]
(United States) D Martin (United States) T Parrott	3	6	[11]
(United States) A Bogomolov Jr. (United States) A Kuznetsov	6^{5}	6	[10]
(United States) J Levine (United States) R Sweeting	7	1	[6]
4	(United States) R DeHeart (Canada) P-L Duclos	7	3	[9]
(Australia) C Guccione (Australia) A Hubble	6^{5}	6	[11]
PR	(Bosnia and Herzegovina) A Delić (United States) B Reynolds	3	6	[10]
(United States) JP Fruttero (South Africa) R Klaasen	6	4	[4]
WC	(Serbia) B Čonkić (United States) R Williams	6	0	[8]
WC	(United States) L Cook (United States) B Joelson	4	6	[10]
WC	(United States) S Bangoura (United States) T Sandgren	2	4
3	(South Africa) R de Voest (South Africa) I van der Merwe	6	6
(United States) N Monroe (United States) D Young	6	6
(United States) T Smyczek (United States) J Witten	3	0
Q	(South Africa) A Anderson (United Kingdom) C Eaton	6	1	[4]
2	(Australia) S Huss (Australia) P Luczak	1	6	[10]

Quarterfinals
(United States) D Martin (United States) T Parrott	6^{7}	7	[8]
(United States) A Bogomolov Jr. (United States) A Kuznetsov	7	6^{5}	[10]
(Australia) C Guccione (Australia) A Hubble	4	6	[7]
PR	(Bosnia and Herzegovina) A Delić (United States) B Reynolds	6	3	[10]
WC	(United States) L Cook (United States) B Joelson	6^{7}	6	[7]
3	(South Africa) R de Voest (South Africa) I van der Merwe	7	3	[10]
(United States) N Monroe (United States) D Young	6	6
2	(Australia) S Huss (Australia) P Luczak	1	3

Semifinals
(United States) A Bogomolov Jr. (United States) A Kuznetsov	6	6
PR	(Bosnia and Herzegovina) A Delić (United States) B Reynolds	2	2
3	(South Africa) R de Voest (South Africa) I van der Merwe	6	6
(United States) N Monroe (United States) D Young	1	3

Final
(United States) A Bogomolov Jr. (United States) A Kuznetsov	1	4
3	(South Africa) R de Voest (South Africa) I van der Merwe	6	6
