= 2014 Knoxville Challenger – Doubles =

Doubles
- 2014 Knoxville Challenger

Final
- Champion: (Latvia) Miķelis Lībietis (United States) Hunter Reese
- Runner-up: (Portugal) Gastão Elias (United Kingdom) Sean Thornley
- Score: 6–3, 6-4

Events
| Singles | Doubles |
- Knoxville Challenger

Samuel Groth and John-Patrick Smith were the defending champions, but Groth and John-Patrick Smith chose not to compete.
Miķelis Lībietis and Hunter Reese won in the final 6–3, 6–4 against Gastão Elias Sean Thornley.

== Seeds ==
1. (Brazil) Marcelo Demoliner / (Venezuela) Roberto Maytín (quarterfinals)
2. (United States) Kevin King / (Venezuela) Juan Carlos Spir (first round)
3. (Philippines) Ruben Gonzales / (India) Purav Raja (quarterfinals)
4. (United States) Denis Kudla / (United States) Rajeev Ram (first round)

== Draw ==
Key

- Q = Qualifier
- WC = Wild card
- LL = Lucky loser
- Alt = Alternate
- ITF = ITF entry
- PR = Protected ranking
- SR = Special ranking
- SE = Special exempt
- JE = Junior exempt
- JR = Junior Accelerator Programme entrant
- CO = College Accelerator Programme entrant
- NG = Next Gen Accelerator Program entrant
- w/o = Walkover
- r = Retired
- d = Defaulted

=== Draw ===
First round
1 | (Brazil) M Demoliner (Venezuela) R Maytín | 7^{8} | 6
(United States) S Bangoura (United States) E King | 6^{6} | 4
(El Salvador) M Arévalo (Mexico) MA Reyes-Varela | 6 | 6
Q | (Japan) T Daniel (Bulgaria) D Kutrovsky | 3 | 4
4 | (United States) D Kudla (United States) R Ram
(United States) C Buchanan (United States) T Sandgren | w/o
(Canada) F Dancevic (Canada) A Shamasdin | 4 | 3
(Portugal) G Elias (United Kingdom) S Thornley | 6 | 6
(United Kingdom) E Corrie (United States) A Kuznetsov | 7^{8} | 6
(Austria) S Bader (Brazil) A Ghem | 6^{6} | 1
(Tunisia) M Jaziri (South Africa) D O'Brien | 0 | 2
3 | (Philippines) R Gonzales (India) P Raja | 6 | 6
WC | (United States) Andrew Dromsky (United States) Jess Jones | 1 | 1
WC | (United States) J Dadamo (United States) D Novikov | 6 | 6
WC | (Latvia) M Lībietis (United States) H Reese | 7^{7} | 4 | [11]
2 | (United States) K King (Venezuela) JC Spir | 6^{5} | 6 | [9]

Quarterfinals
1 | (Brazil) M Demoliner (Venezuela) R Maytín | 6^{4} | 7^{7} | [8]
(El Salvador) M Arévalo (Mexico) MA Reyes-Varela | 7^{7} | 6^{4} | [10]
(United States) C Buchanan (United States) T Sandgren | 1 | 6 | [10]
(Portugal) G Elias (United Kingdom) S Thornley | 6 | 3 | [12]
(United Kingdom) E Corrie (United States) A Kuznetsov | 6 | 6
3 | (Philippines) R Gonzales (India) P Raja | 3 | 4
WC | (United States) J Dadamo (United States) D Novikov
WC | (Latvia) M Lībietis (United States) H Reese | w/o

Semifinals
(El Salvador) M Arévalo (Mexico) MA Reyes-Varela | 4 | 4
(Portugal) G Elias (United Kingdom) S Thornley | 6 | 6
(United Kingdom) E Corrie (United States) A Kuznetsov | 4 | 2
WC | (Latvia) M Lībietis (United States) H Reese | 6 | 6

Final
(Portugal) G Elias (United Kingdom) S Thornley | 3 | 4
WC | (Latvia) M Lībietis (United States) H Reese | 6 | 6
