= 2010 Knoxville Challenger – Singles =

Singles
- 2010 Knoxville Challenger

Final
- Champion: (Japan) Kei Nishikori
- Runner-up: (United States) Robert Kendrick
- Score: 6–1, 6–4

Events
Singles	Doubles
← 2009 ·	Knoxville Challenger	· 2011 →

Taylor Dent was the defending champion, however he chose to not compete this year.
Kei Nishikori won this tournament. He defeated Robert Kendrick 6–1, 6–4 in the final.

== Seeds ==
1. (United States) Ryan Sweeting (first round)
2. (United States) Donald Young (first round)
3. (Japan) Kei Nishikori (champion)
4. (Australia) Peter Luczak (first round)
5. (Australia) ~~Marinko Matosevic~~ (withdrew)
6. (United States) Robert Kendrick (final)
7. (Australia) Carsten Ball (second round)
8. (United States) Tim Smyczek (first round)

== Draw ==
=== Key ===
- Q = Qualifier
- WC = Wild card
- LL = Lucky loser
- Alt = Alternate
- SE = Special exempt
- PR = Protected ranking
- ITF = ITF entry
- JE = Junior exempt
- w/o = Walkover
- r = Retired
- d = Defaulted
- SR = Special ranking

=== Finals ===
Semifinals
LL	(South Africa) Fritz Wolmarans	4	4
6	(United States) Robert Kendrick	6	6
3	(Japan) Kei Nishikori	6	7
Q	(United States) Nicholas Monroe	1	6^{4}

Final
6	(United States) Robert Kendrick	1	4
3	(Japan) Kei Nishikori	6	6

=== Top half ===
First round
1	(United States) R Sweeting	4	4
(United States) M Yani	6	6
(United States) R DeHeart	5	7	6
Q	(Slovenia) L Gregorc	7	6^{5}	1
PR	(Bosnia and Herzegovina) A Delić	6	7
(Australia) G Jones	4	5
PR	(Australia) C Guccione	4	4
LL	(South Africa) F Wolmarans	6	6
4	(Australia) P Luczak	3	4
(South Africa) I van der Merwe	6	6
(South Africa) R de Voest	6^{5}	7	7
WC	(United States) R Williams	7	5	6^{6}
(South Africa) R Klaasen	2	7	7
(United States) J Levine	6	6^{4}	6^{7}
(United States) A Kuznetsov	6	2	2
6	(United States) R Kendrick	4	6	6

Second round
(United States) M Yani	0	3
(United States) R DeHeart	6	6
PR	(Bosnia and Herzegovina) A Delić	1	2
LL	(South Africa) F Wolmarans	6	6
(South Africa) I van der Merwe	6^{1}	6	5
(South Africa) R de Voest	7	1	7
(South Africa) R Klaasen	5	2
6	(United States) R Kendrick	7	6

Quarterfinals
(United States) R DeHeart	4	2
LL	(South Africa) F Wolmarans	6	6
(South Africa) R de Voest	4	4
6	(United States) R Kendrick	6	6

Semifinals
LL	(South Africa) F Wolmarans	4	4
6	(United States) R Kendrick	6	6

=== Bottom half ===
First round
8	(United States) T Smyczek	2	6^{6}
(United States) B Reynolds	6	7
Q	(India) Y Bhambri	4	6	4
(United States) L Cook	6	4	6
Q	(United States) D Martin	7	6
WC	(United States) E Quigley	6^{3}	4
WC	(Australia) J-P Smith	4	1
3	(Japan) K Nishikori	6	6
7	(Australia) C Ball	6	6^{4}	6
WC	(Serbia) B Čonkić	3	7	1
(United States) K Kim	1	4
Q	(United States) N Monroe	6	6
(United States) M McClune	2	7	2
(United States) A Bogomolov Jr.	6	6^{5}	6
(United States) J Witten	2	6	6
2	(United States) D Young	6	4	2

Second round
(United States) B Reynolds	7	6
(United States) L Cook	6^{5}	3
Q	(United States) D Martin	3	2
3	(Japan) K Nishikori	6	6
7	(Australia) C Ball	6^{6}	3
Q	(United States) N Monroe	7	6
(United States) A Bogomolov Jr.	6	4	6^{11}
(United States) J Witten	2	6	7

Quarterfinals
(United States) B Reynolds	3	2
3	(Japan) K Nishikori	6	6
Q	(United States) N Monroe	7	7
(United States) J Witten	6^{6}	6^{4}

Semifinals
3	(Japan) K Nishikori	6	7
Q	(United States) N Monroe	1	6^{4}
