= 2014 Knoxville Challenger – Singles =

Singles
- 2014 Knoxville Challenger

Final
- Champion: (France) Adrian Mannarino
- Runner-up: (Australia) Sam Groth
- Score: 3–6, 7–6^{(8–6)}. 6-4

Events
Singles	Doubles
- Knoxville Challenger

Tennis singles was an event at the 2014 Knoxville Challenger. It was the eleventh iteration of the annual Knoxville Challenger professional tennis tournament. Tim Smyczek was the defending champion. He lost to Sam Groth in the semifinals. Adrian Mannarino won the tournament, defeating Sam Groth 3–6, 7–6^{(8–6)}. 6–4 in the final.

== Seeds ==
1. (Tunisia) Malek Jaziri (quarterfinals)
2. (France) Adrian Mannarino (champion)
3. (Australia) Sam Groth (final)
4. (Slovenia) Blaž Rola (first round)
5. ' (United States) Tim Smyczek (semifinals)
6. (United States) Michael Russell (second round)
7. (Portugal) Gastão Elias (quarterfinals)
8. (United States) Denis Kudla (quarterfinals, withdrew)

== Draw ==
Key

- Q = Qualifier
- WC = Wild card
- LL = Lucky loser
- Alt = Alternate
- ITF = ITF entry
- PR = Protected ranking
- SR = Special ranking
- SE = Special exempt
- JE = Junior exempt
- JR = Junior Accelerator Programme entrant
- CO = College Accelerator Programme entrant
- NG = Next Gen Accelerator Program entrant
- w/o = Walkover
- r = Retired
- d = Defaulted

=== Finals ===
Semifinals
5	(United States) Tim Smyczek	3	4
3	(Australia) Sam Groth	6	6
SE	(United Kingdom) Liam Broady	0	4
2	(France) Adrian Mannarino	6	6

Final
3	(Australia) Sam Groth	6	6^{6}	4
2	(France) Adrian Mannarino	3	7^{8}	6

=== Top half ===
First round
1	(Tunisia) M Jaziri	6^{5}	6	7^{7}
(United States) R Ram	7^{7}	4	6^{3}
(Sweden) C Lindell	3	1
Alt	(France) G Mina	6	6
WC	(United States) D Nguyen	7	1	2
WC	(United States) J Donaldson	5	6	6
WC	(United States) H Reese	3	1
5	(United States) T Smyczek	6	6
3	(Australia) S Groth	4	7	7^{7}
(United Kingdom) E Corrie	6	5	6^{5}
(United States) A Kuznetsov	7^{7}	4	6
(United States) R Ginepri	6^{3}	6	2
(Canada) F Dancevic	7	6
WC	(Latvia) M Lībietis	5	4
(Germany) P Torbeko	6	3	5
7	(Portugal) G Elias	3	6	7

Second round
1	(Tunisia) M Jaziri	6	6
Alt	(France) G Mina	4	4
WC	(United States) J Donaldson	0	4
5	(United States) T Smyczek	6	6
3	(Australia) S Groth	2	6	6
(United States) A Kuznetsov	6	1	2
(Canada) F Dancevic
7	(Portugal) G Elias	w/o

Quarterfinals
1	(Tunisia) M Jaziri	6^{3}	3
5	(United States) T Smyczek	7^{7}	6
3	(Australia) S Groth	3	7	7^{7}
7	(Portugal) G Elias	6	5	6^{3}

Semifinals
5	(United States) T Smyczek	3	4
3	(Australia) S Groth	6	6

=== Bottom half ===
First round
6	(United States) M Russell	6^{4}	3
(Australia) J Duckworth	7^{7}	0^{r}
SE	(United Kingdom) L Broady	6	6
Q	(United States) S Bangoura	2	4
Q	(United Kingdom) M Willis	6^{5}	6	7
(United States) C Buchanan	7^{7}	3	5
Q	(United States) T Sandgren	7^{7}	6
4	(Slovenia) B Rola	6^{4}	3
8	(United States) D Kudla	6	6
Q	(United States) E Quigley	2	2
(Japan) T Daniel	6	6
(Brazil) A Ghem	0	2
(United States) R Williams	3	2
(Republic of Ireland) J McGee	6	6
(United States) R Harrison	1	1
2	(France) A Mannarino	6	6

Second round
6	(United States) M Russell	1	4
SE	(United Kingdom) L Broady	6	6
Q	(United Kingdom) M Willis	6^{4}	6	6
Q	(United States) T Sandgren	7^{7}	4	2
8	(United States) D Kudla	7^{7}	6
(Japan) T Daniel	6^{4}	3
(Republic of Ireland) J McGee	3	2
2	(France) A Mannarino	6	6

Quarterfinals
SE	(United Kingdom) L Broady	7^{7}	6
Q	(United Kingdom) M Willis	6^{5}	4
8	(United States) D Kudla
2	(France) A Mannarino	w/o

Semifinals
SE	(United Kingdom) L Broady	0	4
2	(France) A Mannarino	6	6
