= 2015 Knoxville Challenger =

- Date: 8–15 November
- Edition: 12th
- Surface: Hard
- Location: Knoxville, United States

Champions

Singles
- (United Kingdom) Daniel Evans

Doubles
- (Sweden) Johan Brunström / (Denmark) Frederik Nielsen
- Knoxville Challenger

The 2015 Knoxville Challenger was a professional tennis tournament played on indoor hard courts. It was the twelfth edition of the tournament which was part of the 2015 ATP Challenger Tour. It took place in Knoxville, United States between 8 and 15 November 2015.

== Singles main-draw entrants ==
=== Seeds ===
Country	Player	Rank^{1}	Seed
TUN	Malek Jaziri	95	1
USA	Austin Krajicek	100	2
USA	Tim Smyczek	102	3
USA	Ryan Harrison	110	4
AUS	James Duckworth	116	5
AUS	John-Patrick Smith	122	6
COL	Alejandro Falla	125	7
SLO	Blaž Rola	128	8

- ^{1} Rankings are as of November 2, 2015.

=== Other entrants ===
The following players received wildcards into the singles main draw:

- (United States) Stefan Kozlov
- (United States) Mackenzie McDonald
- (United States) Hunter Reese
- (Colombia) Luis Valero

The following players received entry into the singles main draw as special exempts:

- (United States) Tommy Paul
- (United States) Noah Rubin

The following players received entry from the qualifying draw:

- (United States) Sekou Bangoura
- (Switzerland) Adrien Bossel
- (United States) Eric Quigley
- (United Kingdom) Daniel Smethurst

== Champions ==
=== Singles ===
- (United Kingdom) Daniel Evans def. (United States) Frances Tiafoe 5–7, 6–1, 6–3

=== Doubles ===
- (Sweden) Johan Brunström / (Denmark) Frederik Nielsen def. (United States) Sekou Bangoura / (United States) Matt Seeberger 6–1, 6–2
