= 2012 Knoxville Challenger =

- Date: 5–11 November
- Edition: 9th
- Surface: Hard
- Location: Knoxville, United States

Champions

Singles
- (United States) Michael Russell

Doubles
- (United States) Alex Kuznetsov / (Germany) Mischa Zverev
← 2011 ·	Knoxville Challenger	· 2013 →

The 2012 Knoxville Challenger was a professional tennis tournament played on hard courts. It was the ninth edition of the tournament which was part of the 2012 ATP Challenger Tour. It took place in Knoxville, United States between 5 and 11 November 2012.

== Singles main-draw entrants ==
=== Seeds ===
Country	Player	Rank^{1}	Seed
USA	Jesse Levine	74	1
RUS	Alex Bogomolov Jr.	96	2
USA	Michael Russell	101	3
GER	Mischa Zverev	140	4
USA	Ryan Sweeting	147	5
USA	Bobby Reynolds	152	6
USA	Tim Smyczek	157	7
USA	Denis Kudla	163	8

- ^{1} Rankings are as of October 29, 2012.

=== Other entrants ===
The following players received wildcards into the singles main draw:

- (Australia) Jarryd Chaplin
- (United States) Brandon Ficky
- (United States) Christian Harrison
- (United States) Eric Quigley

The following players received entry from the qualifying draw:

- (United States) Devin Britton
- (Slovenia) Luka Gregorc
- (New Zealand) Daniel King-Turner
- (United States) Austin Krajicek

== Champions ==
=== Singles ===
- (United States) Michael Russell def. (United States) Bobby Reynolds, 6–3, 6–2

=== Doubles ===
- (United States) Alex Kuznetsov / (Germany) Mischa Zverev def. (South Africa) Jean Andersen / (South Africa) Izak van der Merwe, 6–4, 6–2
