= 2014 Knoxville Challenger =

- Date: 4–9 November
- Edition: 11th
- Surface: Hard
- Location: Knoxville, United States

Champions

Singles
- (France) Adrian Mannarino

Doubles
- (Latvia) Miķelis Lībietis / (United States) Hunter Reese
- Knoxville Challenger

The 2014 Knoxville Challenger was a professional tennis tournament played on indoor hard courts. It was the eleventh edition of the tournament, which was part of the 2014 ATP Challenger Tour. It took place in Knoxville, United States between 4 and 9 November 2014.

== Singles main-draw entrants ==
=== Seeds ===
Country	Player	Rank^{1}	Seed
TUN	Malek Jaziri	71	1
FRA	Adrian Mannarino	73	2
AUS	Sam Groth	82	3
SLO	Blaž Rola	88	4
USA	Tim Smyczek	95	5
USA	Michael Russell	129	6
POR	Gastão Elias	132	7
USA	Denis Kudla	133	8

- ^{1} Rankings are as of October 27, 2014.

=== Other entrants ===
The following players received wildcards into the singles main draw:

- (United States) Jared Donaldson
- (Latvia) Miķelis Lībietis
- (United States) Daniel Nguyen
- (United States) Hunter Reese

The following player received entry as a special exemption into the singles main draw:

- (United Kingdom) Liam Broady

The following players received entry as an alternate into the singles main draw:

- (France) Gianni Mina

The following players received entry from the qualifying draw:

- (United States) Sekou Bangoura
- (United States) Eric Quigley
- (United States) Tennys Sandgren
- (United Kingdom) Marcus Willis

The following players received entry into the singles main draw as lucky losers:

- (El Salvador) Marcelo Arévalo

== Champions ==
=== Singles ===
- (France) Adrian Mannarino def. (Australia) Sam Groth 3–6, 7–6^{(8–6)}, 6–4

=== Doubles ===
- (Latvia) Miķelis Lībietis / (United States) Hunter Reese def. (Portugal) Gastão Elias / (United Kingdom) Sean Thornley 6–3, 6–4
