= 2013 Knoxville Challenger – Doubles =

Doubles
- 2013 Knoxville Challenger

Final
- Champions: (Australia) Samuel Groth (Australia) John-Patrick Smith
- Runners-up: (Australia) Carsten Ball (Canada) Peter Polansky
- Score: 6–7^{(6–8)}, 6–2, [10–7]

Events
Singles	Doubles
- Knoxville Challenger

Alex Kuznetsov and Mischa Zverev were the defending champions, but Zverev chose not to compete.
Kuznetsov partnered with Denys Molchanov but lost to eventual champions Samuel Groth and John-Patrick Smith in the semifinals, who also defeated Carsten Ball and Peter Polansky in the final.

== Seeds ==
1. (Australia) Samuel Groth / (Australia) John-Patrick Smith (champions)
2. (United States) Austin Krajicek / (United States) Tennys Sandgren (semifinals)
3. (South Africa) Rik de Voest / (United States) Rajeev Ram (quarterfinals)
4. (Republic of Ireland) James Cluskey / (Austria) Maximilian Neuchrist (quarterfinals)

== Draw ==
Key

- Q = Qualifier
- WC = Wild card
- LL = Lucky loser
- Alt = Alternate
- ITF = ITF entry
- PR = Protected ranking
- SR = Special ranking
- SE = Special exempt
- JE = Junior exempt
- JR = Junior Accelerator Programme entrant
- CO = College Accelerator Programme entrant
- NG = Next Gen Accelerator Program entrant
- w/o = Walkover
- r = Retired
- d = Defaulted

=== Draw ===
First round
1	(Australia) S Groth (Australia) J-P Smith	6	6
Q	(India) S Myneni (India) S Singh	3	4
WC	(Australia) Jarryd Chaplin (United States) Andrew Dromsky	3	4
(United States) R Harrison (United States) D Kudla	6	6
3	(South Africa) R de Voest (United States) R Ram	6	7
WC	(United States) J Jenkins (United States) D Novikov	1	5
(United Kingdom) D Rice (United Kingdom) S Thornley	6	3	[9]
(United States) A Kuznetsov (Ukraine) D Molchanov	3	6	[11]
(United States) K King (United States) J Sock	4	6^{1}
(Australia) C Ball (Canada) P Polansky	6	7^{7}
WC	(United States) E King (United States) Dennis Nevolo	6^{6}	1
4	(Republic of Ireland) J Cluskey (Austria) M Neuchrist	7^{8}	6
(United States) S Johnson (United States) T Smyczek	6	6
PR	(Greece) T Angelinos (France) Laurent Rochette	1	3
(Canada) Milan Pokrajac (United States) D Zivkovic	6	2	[8]
2	(United States) A Krajicek (United States) T Sandgren	2	6	[10]

Quarterfinals
1	(Australia) S Groth (Australia) J-P Smith	w/o
(United States) R Harrison (United States) D Kudla
3	(South Africa) R de Voest (United States) R Ram	0	3
(United States) A Kuznetsov (Ukraine) D Molchanov	6	6
(Australia) C Ball (Canada) P Polansky	6	6
4	(Republic of Ireland) J Cluskey (Austria) M Neuchrist	0	2
(United States) S Johnson (United States) T Smyczek	6^{1}	4
2	(United States) A Krajicek (United States) T Sandgren	7^{7}	6

Semifinals
1	(Australia) S Groth (Australia) J-P Smith	6	6
(United States) A Kuznetsov (Ukraine) D Molchanov	0	2
(Australia) C Ball (Canada) P Polansky	6	7^{7}
2	(United States) A Krajicek (United States) T Sandgren	3	6^{3}

Final
1	(Australia) S Groth (Australia) J-P Smith	6^{6}	6	[10]
(Australia) C Ball (Canada) P Polansky	7^{7}	2	[7]
