= 2011 Knoxville Challenger =

- Date: 8–13 November
- Edition: 8th
- Surface: Hard
- Location: Knoxville, United States

Champions

Singles
- (United States) Jesse Levine

Doubles
- (United States) Steve Johnson / (United States) Austin Krajicek
← 2010 ·	Knoxville Challenger	· 2012 →

The 2011 Knoxville Challenger was a professional tennis tournament played on hard courts. It was the eighth edition of the tournament which is part of the 2011 ATP Challenger Tour. It took place in Knoxville, United States between 8 and 13 November 2011.

== Singles main-draw entrants ==
=== Seeds ===
Country	Player	Rank^{1}	Seed
USA	Michael Russell	93	1
USA	Bobby Reynolds	120	2
RSA	Rik de Voest	122	3
RSA	Izak van der Merwe	132	4
CAN	Vasek Pospisil	133	5
BLR	Uladzimir Ignatik	172	6
USA	Michael Yani	177	7
AUS	Greg Jones	192	8

- ^{1} Rankings are as of October 31, 2011.

=== Other entrants ===
The following players received wildcards into the singles main draw:

- (United States) Denis Kudla
- (United States) Tennys Sandgren
- (Australia) John-Patrick Smith
- (United States) Rhyne Williams

The following players received entry as an alternate into the singles main draw:

- (United Kingdom) Jamie Baker
- (Canada) Pierre-Ludovic Duclos

The following players received entry as a special exempt into the singles main draw:

- (United States) Jesse Levine

The following players received entry from the qualifying draw:

- (United States) Brian Baker
- (Bosnia and Herzegovina) Mirza Bašić
- (United States) Steve Johnson
- (Bulgaria) Dimitar Kutrovsky

== Champions ==
=== Singles ===
(United States) Jesse Levine def. (United States) Brian Baker, 6–2, 6–3

=== Doubles ===
(United States) Steve Johnson / (United States) Austin Krajicek def. (Australia) Adam Hubble / (Denmark) Frederik Nielsen, 3–6, 6–4, [13–11]
