= 2012 Knoxville Challenger – Singles =

Singles
- 2012 Knoxville Challenger

Final
- Champion: (United States) Michael Russell
- Runner-up: (United States) Bobby Reynolds
- Score: 6–3, 6–2

Events
Singles	Doubles
- Knoxville Challenger

Jesse Levine was the defending champion but was defeated in the First Round by Tennys Sandgren.
Michael Russell won the final 6–3, 6–2 against Bobby Reynolds.

== Seeds ==
1. (United States) Jesse Levine (first round)
2. (Russia) Alex Bogomolov Jr. (first round, retired because of a shoulder injury)
3. (United States) Michael Russell (champion)
4. (Germany) Mischa Zverev (second round)
5. (United States) Ryan Sweeting (second round)
6. (United States) Bobby Reynolds (final)
7. (United States) Tim Smyczek (semifinals)
8. (United States) Denis Kudla (quarterfinals)

== Draw ==
Key

- Q = Qualifier
- WC = Wild card
- LL = Lucky loser
- Alt = Alternate
- ITF = ITF entry
- PR = Protected ranking
- SR = Special ranking
- SE = Special exempt
- JE = Junior exempt
- JR = Junior Accelerator Programme entrant
- CO = College Accelerator Programme entrant
- NG = Next Gen Accelerator Program entrant
- w/o = Walkover
- r = Retired
- d = Defaulted

=== Finals ===
Semifinals
(Australia) Samuel Groth	6^{3}	6^{1}
3	(United States) Michael Russell	7^{7}	7^{7}
7	(United States) Tim Smyczek	4	6^{5}
6	(United States) Bobby Reynolds	6	7^{7}

Final
3	(United States) Michael Russell	6	6
6	(United States) Bobby Reynolds	3	2

=== Top half ===
First round
1	(United States) J Levine	6^{4}	6	3
(United States) T Sandgren	7^{7}	3	6
(Switzerland) A Bossel	6	6
WC	(Australia) Jarryd Chaplin	2	4
(Australia) S Groth	4	6	7^{7}
LL	(South Africa) F Wolmarans	6	1	6^{4}
(South Korea) S-Y Jeong	5	3
5	(United States) R Sweeting	7	6
3	(United States) M Russell	6	6
WC	(United States) E Quigley	2	2
Q	(United States) D Britton	6	6
WC	(United States) C Harrison	3	4
(United States) B Klahn	7^{7}	4	6
(Australia) J-P Smith	6^{2}	6	3
(United States) J Sock	3	6	6^{5}
8	(United States) D Kudla	6	2	7^{7}

Second round
(United States) T Sandgren	7^{7}	6
(Switzerland) A Bossel	6^{2}	2
(Australia) S Groth	7^{7}	7
5	(United States) R Sweeting	6^{3}	5
3	(United States) M Russell	6	6
Q	(United States) D Britton	3	3
(United States) B Klahn	2	2
8	(United States) D Kudla	6	6

Quarterfinals
(United States) T Sandgren	6^{2}	1
(Australia) S Groth	7^{7}	6
3	(United States) M Russell	4	7^{7}	6
8	(United States) D Kudla	6	6^{5}	3

Semifinals
(Australia) S Groth	6^{3}	6^{1}
3	(United States) M Russell	7^{7}	7^{7}

=== Bottom half ===
First round
7	(United States) T Smyczek	6^{6}	6	7^{7}
(United Kingdom) A Bogdanovic	7^{8}	2	6^{5}
(Switzerland) M Lammer	1	7^{8}	4
(South Africa) I van der Merwe	6	6^{6}	6
(United States) R Williams	6^{3}	6	7^{7}
Q	(United States) A Krajicek	7^{7}	4	6^{4}
Q	(New Zealand) D King-Turner	2	3
4	(Germany) M Zverev	6	6
6	(United States) B Reynolds	6	6
(Chinese Taipei) T-h Yang	2	2
(France) C Reix	4	3
PR	(United States) J Witten	6	6
(United States) A Kuznetsov	7	6
WC	(United States) Brandon Ficky	5	2
Q	(Slovenia) L Gregorc	7^{7}	5
2	(Russia) A Bogomolov Jr.	6^{5}	1^{r}

Second round
7	(United States) T Smyczek	7	7
(South Africa) I van der Merwe	5	5
(United States) R Williams	4	7	6
4	(Germany) M Zverev	6	5	3
6	(United States) B Reynolds	6	6
PR	(United States) J Witten	2	4
(United States) A Kuznetsov	6	6
Q	(Slovenia) L Gregorc	4	4

Quarterfinals
7	(United States) T Smyczek	6	6
(United States) R Williams	3	4
6	(United States) B Reynolds	6	6
(United States) A Kuznetsov	4	3

Semifinals
7	(United States) T Smyczek	4	6^{5}
6	(United States) B Reynolds	6	7^{7}
