= 2026 Knoxville Challenger =

- Date: 9–15 November
- Edition: 22nd
- Surface: Hard (indoor)
- Location: Knoxville, United States

Champions

Singles
- (France) Clément Chidekh

Doubles
- (Netherlands) Jarno Jans / (Belgium) Joran Vliegen
- Knoxville Challenger

The 2026 Knoxville Challenger was a professional tennis tournament played on indoor hard courts. It was the 22nd edition of the tournament which was part of the 2026 ATP Challenger Tour. It took place in Knoxville, United States between 9 and 15 November 2026.

== Singles main-draw entrants ==
=== Seeds ===
Country	Player	Rank^{1}	Seed
USA	Marcos Giron	89	1
USA	Michael Zheng	100	2
COL	Nicolás Mejía	115	3
FRA	Clément Chidekh	131	4
USA	Darwin Blanch	139	5
USA	Michael Mmoh	149	6
CAN	Liam Draxl	168	7
CAN	Alexis Galarneau	195	8

- ^{1} Rankings are as of November 2, 2026.

=== Other entrants ===
The following players received wildcards into the singles main draw:

- (United States) Marcos Giron
- (Israel) Orel Kimhi
- (United States) Marcel Latak

The following player received entry into the singles main draw as a special exempt:

- (United States) Aidan Mayo

The following player received entry into the singles main draw through the College Accelerator programme:

- (Canada) Duncan Chan

The following player received entry into the singles main draw through the Junior Accelerator programme:

- (United States) Jack Kennedy

The following player received entry into the singles main draw through the Next Gen Accelerator programme:

- (United States) Trevor Svajda

The following players received entry into the singles main draw as alternates:

- (Jordan) Abdullah Shelbayh
- (United Kingdom) Oliver Tarvet

The following players received entry from the qualifying draw:

- (United States) Ozan Baris
- (United Kingdom) Giles Hussey
- (France) Timo Legout
- (United Kingdom) Lui Maxted
- (United States) Daniel Milavsky
- (Slovenia) Filip Jeff Planinšek

The following player received entry as a lucky loser:

- (Japan) Kenta Miyoshi

== Champions ==
=== Singles ===
- (France) Clément Chidekh def. (Jordan) Abdullah Shelbayh 6–1, 2–0 retired.

=== Doubles ===
- (Netherlands) Jarno Jans / (Belgium) Joran Vliegen def. (Ecuador) Andy Andrade / (Denmark) Johannes Ingildsen 7–5, 6–3.
