= Adam Hubble =

Australian tennis player

- Country (sports): Australia
- Born: 15 March 1986 (age 39)
- Height: 5 ft 7 in (170 cm)
- Plays: Right-handed (Double-handed backhand)
- Prize money: US$49,986

Singles
- Career record: 0–0
- Career titles: 0
- Highest ranking: No. 679 (30 November 2009)

Doubles
- Career record: 0–0
- Career titles: 0
- Highest ranking: No. 146 (2 August 2010)

Adam Hubble (born 25 March 1986) was an Australian professional tennis player playing on the ITF Men's Circuit and the ATP Challenger Tour who specialized in doubles. On 30 November 2009, he reached his highest ATP singles ranking of No. 679 whilst his best doubles ranking was No. 146 on 2 August 2010. He was best known for multiple tournament wins with fellow Australian player Kaden Hensel. Hubble briefly played NCAA div I tennis for the University of Tennessee before turning semi professional. His last professional singles tournament was in Burnie, Australia in February 2015 and last professional doubles tournament was in Liberec, Czech Republic in August 2015. His playing style relied on a big serve, soft hands, high percentage returns and an elite level of fitness. Adam Hubble is now the Head Coach at Grace Park Hawthorn Club in Hawthorn Australia. He is a distant relation to famed astronomer Edwin Hubble. Adam Hubble is currently dating Australian tennis player Miranda Poile.

== Career finals ==
=== Doubles finals: 7 (2–5) ===
Legend Grand Slam tournaments (0–0) ATP World Tour Finals (0–0) ATP World Tour Masters 1000 (0–0) ATP World Tour 500 Series (0–0) ATP World Tour 250 Series (0–0) ATP Challenger Tour (2–5)	Titles by surface Hard (1–4) Grass (0–0) Clay (1–1) Carpet (0–0)

Outcome	No.	Date	Tournament	Surface	Partner	Opponents in the final	Score
Winner	1.	15 August 2009	Samarkand, Uzbekistan	Clay	(Australia) Kaden Hensel	(Russia) Valery Rudnev (Ukraine) Ivan Sergeyev	7–5, 7–5
Winner	2.	28 March 2010	Rimouski, Canada	Hard (i)	(Australia) Kaden Hensel	(United States) Scott Lipsky (United States) David Martin	7–6^{(7–5)}, 3–6, [11–9]
Runner-up	1.	18 April 2010	León, Mexico	Hard	(Australia) Kaden Hensel	(Mexico) Santiago González (Canada) Vasek Pospisil	6–3, 3–6, [8–10]
Runner-up	2.	25 July 2010	Lexington, United States	Hard	(Australia) Kaden Hensel	(South Africa) Raven Klaasen (South Africa) Izak van der Merwe	7–5, 4–6, [6–10]
Runner-up	3.	13 November 2011	Knoxville, United States	Hard (i)	(Denmark) Frederik Nielsen	(United States) Steve Johnson (United States) Austin Krajicek	6–3, 4–6, [11–13]
Runner-up	4.	22 July 2012	Poznań, Poland	Clay	(Australia) Nima Roshan	(Australia) Rameez Junaid (Germany) Simon Stadler	3–6, 4–6
Runner–up	5.	15 February 2015	Launceston	Hard	(Australia) Jose Rubin Statham	(Moldova) Radu Albot (United States) Mitchell Krueger	6–3, 5–7, [9–11]
