= Matt Seeberger =

American tennis player

- Country (sports): United States
- Residence: San Francisco, United States
- Born: August 10, 1984 (age 40); San Francisco, United States
- Height: 6 ft 2 in (1.88 m)
- Turned pro: 2014
- Plays: Right-handed (two handed-backhand)
- Prize money: $37,163

Singles
- Career titles: 0
- Highest ranking: No. 1200 (August 3, 2015)

Doubles
- Career record: 0–1 (at ATP Tour level, Grand Slam level, and in Davis Cup)
- Career titles: 11 ITF
- Highest ranking: No. 155 (July 27, 2015)

Grand Slam doubles results
- US Open: 1R (2015)
- Last updated on: August 31, 2015.

Matt Seeberger (born August 10, 1984) is an American tennis player.

Seeberger has a career high ATP singles ranking of 1200 achieved on August 3, 2015. He also has a career high ATP doubles ranking of 155 achieved on July 27, 2015.

Partnering Julio Peralta in 2015, Seeberger won the US Open National Playoffs awarding the pair a wildcard into the main draw of the 2015 US Open men's doubles event.
