= Quinn Vandecasteele =

American tennis player (born 2002)

- Country (sports): United States
- Born: September 1, 2002 (age 24) Murray, Utah, United States
- Height: 6 ft 3 in (1.91 m)
- Plays: Right-handed (two-handed backhand)
- College: Oregon
- Prize money: US $95,062

Singles
- Career record: 0–0 (at ATP Tour level, Grand Slam level, and in Davis Cup)
- Career titles: 1 ITF
- Highest ranking: No. 438 (August 31, 2026)
- Current ranking: No. 438 (August 31, 2026)

Doubles
- Career record: 0–0 (at ATP Tour level, Grand Slam level, and in Davis Cup)
- Career titles: 1 ATP Challenger
- Highest ranking: No. 578 (November 10, 2025)
- Current ranking: No. 715 (August 31, 2026)
- Last updated on: August 31, 2026.

Quinn Vandecasteele (born September 1, 2002) is an American tennis player. Vandecasteele has a career high ATP singles ranking of No. 438 achieved on August 31, 2026 and a career high ATP doubles ranking of No. 578 achieved on November 10, 2025.

Vandecasteele played college tennis at Oregon.

== Career ==
Vandecasteele won his maiden ATP Challenger doubles title at the 2025 Knoxville Challenger.
