= Shunsuke Mitsui =

Japanese tennis player (born 2002)

- Country (sports): Japan
- Born: 20 May 2002 (age 24) Shizuoka, Japan
- Height: 1.78 m (5 ft 10 in)
- Plays: Right-handed
- College: Tennessee
- Prize money: US $52,998

Singles
- Career record: 0–0 (at ATP Tour level, Grand Slam level, and in Davis Cup)
- Career titles: 2 ITF
- Highest ranking: No. 517 (20 April 2026)
- Current ranking: No. 589 (19 October 2026)

Doubles
- Career record: 0–0 (at ATP Tour level, Grand Slam level, and in Davis Cup)
- Career titles: 1 Challenger, 5 ITF
- Highest ranking: No. 365 (26 October 2026)
- Current ranking: No. 365 (26 October 2026)
- Last updated on: 26 October 2026.

Shunsuke Mitsui (born 20 May 2002) is a Japanese tennis player. Mitsui has a career high ATP singles ranking of No. 517 achieved on 20 April 2026 and a career high ATP doubles ranking of No. 365 achieved on 26 October 2026.

Mitsui has won one ATP Challenger doubles title at the 2025 Champaign Challenger.

Mitsui played college tennis at Tennessee.
