= Mitchell Krueger =

American tennis player (born 1994)

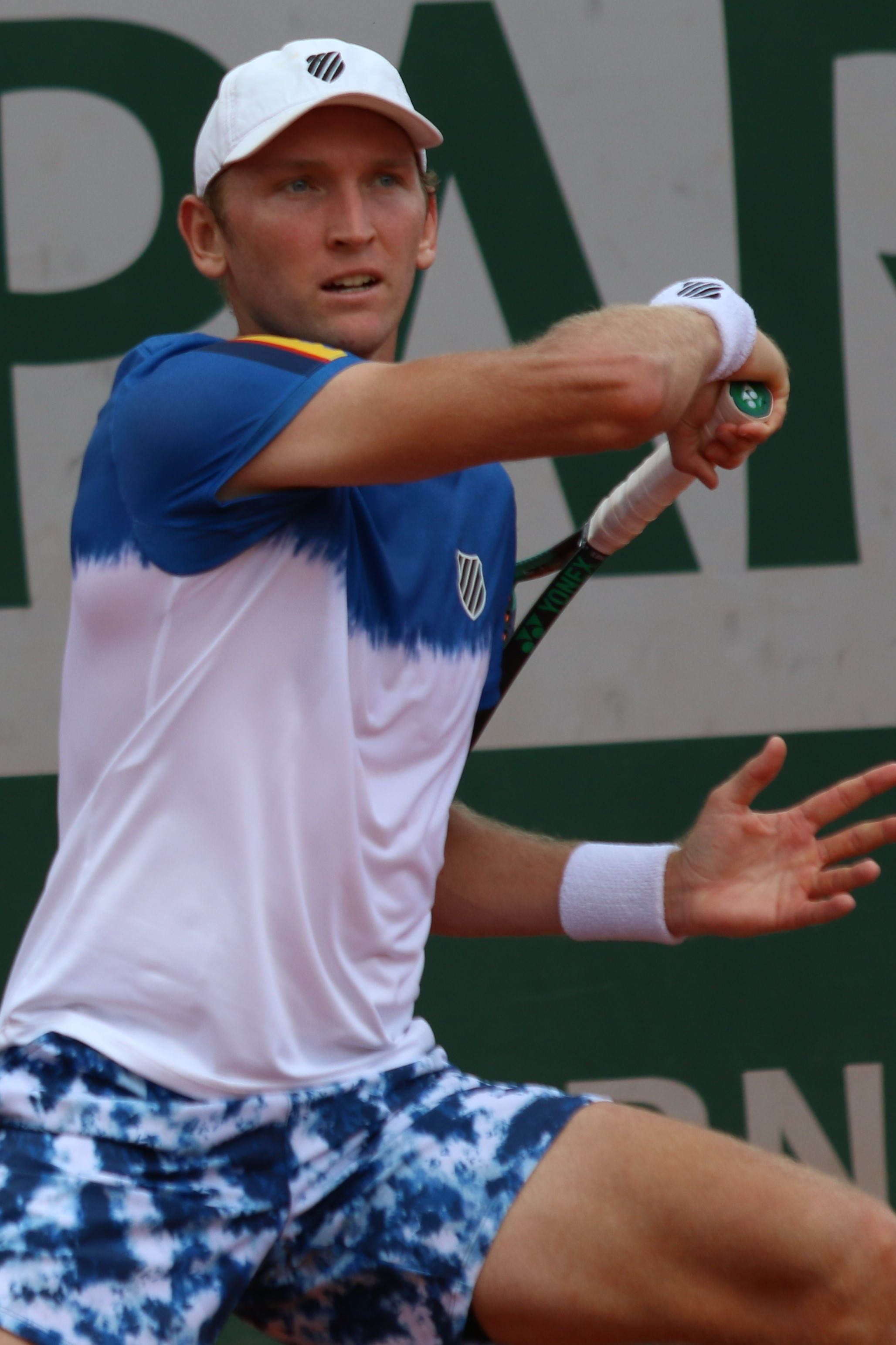
- Krueger at the 2022 French Open
- Full name: Mitchell Krueger
- Country (sports): United States
- Residence: Dallas, Texas, U.S.
- Born: January 12, 1994 (age 32) Fort Worth, Texas, U.S.
- Height: 6 ft 2 in (1.88 m)
- Turned pro: 2012
- Plays: Right-handed (two handed-backhand)
- Coach: Craig Kardon
- Prize money: US $1,961,805

Singles
- Career record: 11–25
- Career titles: 0
- Highest ranking: No. 135 (July 18, 2022)
- Current ranking: No. 358 (August 31, 2026)

Grand Slam singles results
- Australian Open: 2R (2025)
- French Open: Q1 (2015, 2017, 2019, 2020, 2021, 2022, 2025)
- Wimbledon: Q2 (2022)
- US Open: 2R (2020, 2024)

Doubles
- Career record: 0–6
- Career titles: 0
- Highest ranking: No. 173 (April 27, 2015)
- Current ranking: No. 509 (August 31, 2026)

Grand Slam doubles results
- US Open: 1R (2019, 2021, 2024)

Grand Slam mixed doubles results
- US Open: 1R (2012, 2017, 2021)
- Last updated on: September 1, 2026.

Mitchell Krueger (born January 12, 1994) is an American professional tennis player. He has a career-high ATP singles ranking of world No. 135 achieved on July 18, 2022 and a doubles ranking of No. 173 achieved on April 27, 2015.

== Professional career ==
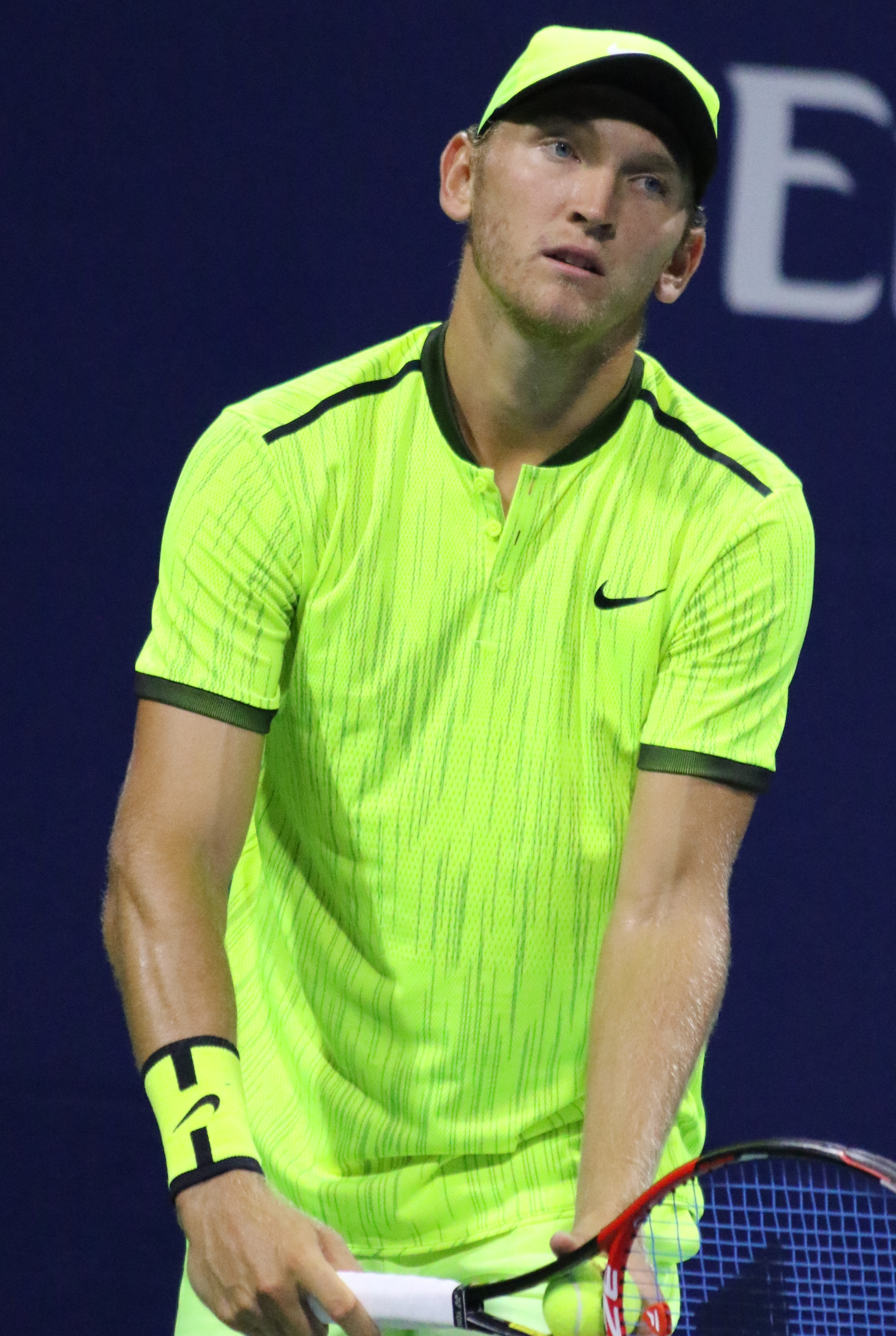
Krueger at the 2016 US Open

Krueger received a wildcard into the 2012 US Open mixed doubles event, where he partnered fellow American Samantha Crawford, but lost in the first round.

He made his ATP Tour main-draw debut and recorded his first ATP win when he qualified and defeated Benoît Paire for a first of two wins of his career against this same player at the 2017 Western & Southern Open and the 2018 BNP Paribas Open. He made his Grand Slam debut when he qualified into the main draw of the 2018 US Open.

At the 2019 Australian Open, Krueger qualified for the first time at this Major but lost to world No. 1, Novak Djokovic, in the first round.

His first Grand Slam win was at the 2020 US Open where he defeated Pedro Sousa in the first round as a wildcard.

He received a wildcard for the inaugural edition of the 2022 Dallas Open. The following week at the 2022 Delray Beach Open, he reached the second round as a qualifier, defeating Jordan Thompson for his fourth ATP Tour-level win before losing to third seed Grigor Dimitrov.

He received also a wildcard for the 2024 Dallas Open where he lost to Max Purcell. Ranked No. 192, he qualified for the main draw of the Citi DC Open in Washington and recorded his first ATP win in close to a year, since August 2023. Ranked No. 170, he qualified for the 2024 US Open making his third main draw appearance at this Grand Slam and defeated fellow qualifier Hugo Grenier, for his second win at this tournament and second Major win in his career.

Ranked No. 140, he entered the main draw 2024 Hangzhou Open, as a lucky loser, into the second round, after the late withdrawal of third seed Tomás Martín Etcheverry, getting a first round bye.

== World TeamTennis ==
Mitchell enters his second season with World TeamTennis in 2020, after making his debut with the Philadelphia Freedoms in 2019. It was announced he joined the Springfield Lasers during the 2020 WTT season that began on July 12.

== Performance timeline ==
Key
| W | F | SF | QF | #R | RR | Q# | DNQ | A | NH |

(W) winner; (F) finalist; (SF) semifinalist; (QF) quarterfinalist; (#R) rounds 4, 3, 2, 1; (RR) round-robin stage; (Q#) qualification round; (DNQ) did not qualify; (A) absent; (NH) not held; (SR) strike rate (events won / competed); (W–L) win–loss record.
To avoid confusion and double counting, these charts are updated at the conclusion of a tournament or when the player's participation has ended.

=== Singles ===
| Tournament | 2012 | 2013 | 2014 | 2015 | 2016 | 2017 | 2018 | 2019 | 2020 | 2021 | 2022 | 2023 | 2024 | 2025 | 2026 | SR | W–L | Win % |
|---|---|---|---|---|---|---|---|---|---|---|---|---|---|---|---|---|---|---|
Grand Slam tournaments
| Australian Open | A | A | A | A | Q1 | Q2 | Q2 | 1R | Q1 | Q2 | Q2 | Q2 | A | 2R | Q1 | 0 / 2 | 1–2 | 33% |
| French Open | A | A | A | Q1 | A | Q1 | A | Q1 | Q1 | Q1 | Q1 | A | A | Q1 | | 0 / 0 | 0–0 | – |
| Wimbledon | A | A | A | A | A | Q1 | Q1 | Q1 | NH | Q1 | Q2 | A | A | Q1 | | 0 / 0 | 0–0 | – |
| US Open | Q2 | Q1 | A | Q2 | Q2 | Q3 | 1R | Q2 | 2R | Q2 | Q1 | A | 2R | Q3 | | 0 / 3 | 2–3 | 40% |
| Win–loss | 0–0 | 0–0 | 0–0 | 0–0 | 0–0 | 0–0 | 0–1 | 0–1 | 1–1 | 0–0 | 0–0 | 0–0 | 1–1 | 1–1 | 0–0 | 0 / 5 | 3–5 | 38% |
ATP Masters 1000
| Indian Wells Masters | A | A | A | Q1 | Q2 | Q2 | 2R | Q1 | NH | Q1 | Q1 | Q1 | A | Q1 | | 0 / 1 | 1–1 | 50% |
| Miami Open | A | A | A | A | A | A | A | Q1 | NH | Q2 | 1R | A | A | Q1 | | 0 / 1 | 0–1 | 0% |
| Monte Carlo Masters | A | A | A | A | A | A | A | A | NH | A | A | A | A | A | | 0 / 0 | 0–0 | – |
| Madrid Open | A | A | A | A | A | A | A | A | NH | A | A | A | A | Q1 | | 0 / 0 | 0-0 | – |
| Italian Open | A | A | A | A | A | A | A | A | A | A | A | A | A | Q1 | | 0 / 0 | 0–0 | – |
| Canadian Open | A | A | A | A | A | A | A | A | NH | A | A | A | A | Q1 | | 0 / 0 | 0–0 | – |
| Cincinnati Masters | A | A | A | A | A | R2 | Q1 | A | A | Q1 | A | A | A | Q1 | | 0 / 1 | 1–1 | 50% |
| Shanghai Masters | A | A | A | A | A | A | A | A | NH | | | A | Q2 | A | | 0 / 0 | 0–0 | – |
| Paris Masters | A | A | A | A | A | A | A | A | A | A | A | A | A | A | | 0 / 0 | 0–0 | – |
| Win–loss | 0–0 | 0–0 | 0–0 | 0–0 | 0–0 | 1–1 | 1–1 | 0–0 | 0–0 | 0–0 | 0–1 | 0–0 | 0–0 | 0-0 | 0-0 | 0 / 3 | 2–3 | 40% |

== ATP Challenger and ITF Futures/World Tennis Tour finals ==
=== Singles: 21 (10 titles, 11 runner-ups) ===
| Legend ATP Challenger Tour (6–4) ITF Futures/WTT (4–7) | Finals by surface Hard (9–5) Clay (1–6) |

| Result | W–L | Date | Tournament | Tier | Surface | Opponent | Score |
|---|---|---|---|---|---|---|---|
| Loss | 0–1 | Jul 2016 | Levene Gouldin & Thompson Tennis Challenger, US | Challenger | Hard | (Barbados) Darian King | 2–6, 3–6 |
| Loss | 0–2 | Feb 2017 | Launceston International, Australia | Challenger | Hard | (United States) Noah Rubin | 0–6, 1–6 |
| Win | 1–2 | Feb 2019 | RBC Tennis Championships of Dallas, US | Challenger | Hard (i) | (United States) Mackenzie McDonald | 4–6, 7–6^{(7–3)}, 6–1 |
| Win | 2–2 | Jul 2021 | Cary Challenger, US | Challenger | Hard | (India) Ramkumar Ramanathan | 7–6^{(7–4)}, 6–2 |
| Win | 3–2 | Sep 2021 | Cary Challenger II, US | Challenger | Hard | (United States) Bjorn Fratangelo | 6–4, 6–3 |
| Win | 4–2 | Jan 2024 | Southern California Open Challenger, US | Challenger | Hard | (United States) Brandon Holt | 4–6, 6–3, 6–4 |
| Loss | 4–3 | Apr 2024 | Tallahassee Tennis Challenger, US | Challenger | Clay | (Belgium) Zizou Bergs | 4–6, 6–7^{(9–11)} |
| Win | 5–3 | May 2024 | Little Rock Challenger, US | Challenger | Hard | (Japan) Yuta Shimizu | 6–3, 6–4 |
| Loss | 5–4 | May 2025 | Open de Oeiras, Portugal | Challenger | Clay | (Chile) Cristian Garín | 6–7^{(3–7)}, 6–4, 2–6 |
| Win | 6–4 | Nov 2025 | Knoxville Challenger, US | Challenger | Hard (i) | (United States) Darwin Blanch | 6–7^{(2–7)}, 6–4, 6–1 |

| Result | W–L | Date | Tournament | Tier | Surface | Opponent | Score |
|---|---|---|---|---|---|---|---|
| Win | 1–0 | Jun 2013 | Netherlands F2, Alkmaar | Futures | Clay | (Brazil) Ricardo Hocevar | 4–6, 7–5, 6–2 |
| Loss | 1–1 | Mar 2014 | US F8, Bakersfield | Futures | Hard | (United States) Daniel Kosakowski | 4–6, 6–3, 4–6 |
| Loss | 1–2 | May 2014 | US F13, Orange Park | Futures | Clay | (Chile) Nicolás Jarry | 1–6, 6–7^{(6–8)} |
| Loss | 1–3 | Jun 2014 | Italy F16, Cesena | Futures | Clay | (Italy) Luca Vanni | 6–4, 3–6, 1–6 |
| Loss | 1–4 | Jun 2014 | Italy F18, Naples | Futures | Clay | (Italy) Luca Vanni | 3–6, 3–6 |
| Loss | 1–5 | Sep 2014 | Canada F9, Toronto | Futures | Clay | (United States) Bjorn Fratangelo | 2–6, 3–6 |
| Loss | 1–6 | Dec 2014 | Dominican Republic F4, Santo Domingo | Futures | Hard | (Russia) Andrey Rublev | 2–6, 4–6 |
| Win | 2–6 | Jan 2015 | US F2, Los Angeles | Futures | Hard | (United States) Jason Jung | 6–1, 6–2 |
| Loss | 2–7 | Jul 2015 | US F21, Wichita | Futures | Hard | (India) Sanam Singh | 6–7^{(6–8)}, 6–7^{(4–7)} |
| Win | 3–7 | Jun 2016 | China F9, Jinan | Futures | Hard | (New Zealand) Finn Tearney | 7–6^{(7–4)}, 6–3 |
| Win | 4–7 | Jul 2023 | M25 Dallas, US | WTT | Hard (i) | (United States) Aidan Mayo | 6–4, 6–0 |

=== Doubles: 28 (8 titles, 20 runner-ups) ===
| Legend ATP Challenger Tour (4–11) ITF Futures/WTT (4–9) | Finals by surface Hard (7–13) Clay (1–7) |

| Result | W–L | Date | Tournament | Tier | Surface | Partner | Opponents | Score |
|---|---|---|---|---|---|---|---|---|
| Loss | 0–1 | May 2014 | Tallahassee Tennis Challenger, US | Challenger | Clay | (United States) Bjorn Fratangelo | (Australia) Ryan Agar (Austria) Sebastian Bader | 4–6, 6–7^{(3–7)} |
| Loss | 0–2 | Nov 2014 | Latrobe City Traralgon ATP Challenger, Australia | Challenger | Hard | (United States) Jarmere Jenkins | (Australia) Dane Propoggia (United Kingdom) Brydan Klein | 1–6, 6–1, [3–10] |
| Win | 1–2 | Feb 2015 | Launceston International, Australia | Challenger | Hard | (Moldova) Radu Albot | (Australia) Adam Hubble (New Zealand) Jose Statham | 3–6, 7–5, [11–9] |
| Loss | 1–3 | Sep 2015 | Columbus Challenger, US | Challenger | Hard (i) | (United States) Eric Quigley | (United States) Chase Buchanan (Slovenia) Blaž Rola | 4–6, 6–4, [17–19] |
| Loss | 1–4 | Apr 2016 | Open de Guadeloupe, Guadeloupe (France) | Challenger | Hard | (United States) Austin Krajicek | (United States) James Cerretani (Netherlands) Antal van der Duim | 2–6, 7–5, [8–10] |
| Win | 2–4 | Jul 2016 | Winnipeg Challenger, Canada | Challenger | Hard | (United States) Daniel Nguyen | (Australia) Jarryd Chaplin (Australia) Benjamin Mitchell | 6–2, 7–5 |
| Loss | 2–5 | May 2017 | Savannah Challenger, US | Challenger | Clay | (United Kingdom) Luke Bambridge | (Canada) Peter Polansky (United Kingdom) Neal Skupski | 6–4, 3–6, [1–10] |
| Win | 3–5 | Nov 2019 | Charlottesville Men's Pro Challenger, US | Challenger | Hard (i) | (Slovenia) Blaž Rola | (United States) Sekou Bangoura (Slovenia) Blaž Kavčič | 6–4, 6–1 |
| Loss | 3–6 | Mar 2020 | Oracle Challenger Series - Indian Wells, US | Challenger | Hard | (United States) Sebastian Korda | (United States) Denis Kudla (United States) Thai-Son Kwiatkowski | 3–6, 6–2, [6–10] |
| Win | 4–6 | Apr 2021 | Orlando Open, US | Challenger | Hard | (United States) Jack Sock | (United States) Dennis Novikov (United States) Christian Harrison | 4–6, 7–5, [13–11] |
| Loss | 4–7 | Aug 2022 | Chicago Men's Challenger, US | Challenger | Hard | (United States) Evan King | (Sweden) André Göransson (Japan) Ben McLachlan | 4–6, 7–6^{(7–3)}, [5–10] |
| Loss | 4–8 | Nov 2022 | Knoxville Challenger, US | Challenger | Hard (i) | (United States) Martin Damm Jr. | (United States) Hunter Reese (United States) Tennys Sandgren | 7–6^{(7–4)}, 6–7^{(3–7)}, [5–10] |
| Loss | 4–9 | Feb 2023 | Texas Tennis Classic, US | Challenger | Hard | (United States) Evan King | (Serbia) Ivan Sabanov (Serbia) Matej Sabanov | 1–6, 6–3, [10–12] |
| Loss | 4–10 | Nov 2023 | Knoxville Challenger, US | Challenger | Hard (i) | (United States) Mac Kiger | (United States) Cannon Kingsley (Venezuela) Luis David Martínez | 6–7^{(3–7)}, 3–6 |
| Loss | 4–11 | Nov 2025 | Knoxville Challenger, US | Challenger | Hard (i) | (Antigua and Barbuda) Jody Maginley | (Australia) Patrick Harper (United States) Quinn Vandecasteele | 7–6^{(8–6)}, 6–7^{(4–7)}, [10–12] |

| Result | W–L | Date | Tournament | Tier | Surface | Partner | Opponents | Score |
|---|---|---|---|---|---|---|---|---|
| Win | 1–0 | Oct 2012 | US F29, Birmingham | Futures | Clay | (United States) Bjorn Fratangelo | (United States) Chase Buchanan (United States) Vahid Mirzadeh | 6–2, 6–3 |
| Loss | 1–1 | Jun 2013 | Netherlands F3, Breda | Futures | Clay | (United States) Bjorn Fratangelo | (Finland) Henri Kontinen (Indonesia) Christopher Rungkat | 4–6, 5–7 |
| Loss | 1–2 | May 2014 | US F13, Orange Park | Futures | Clay | (United States) Bjorn Fratangelo | (United States) Connor Smith (United States) Dennis Novikov | 3–6, 2–6 |
| Loss | 1–3 | May 2014 | US F14, Tampa | Futures | Clay | (United States) Bjorn Fratangelo | (Brazil) Tiago Lopes (Chile) Nicolás Jarry | 5–7, 1–6 |
| Loss | 1–4 | Jun 2014 | Italy F17, Parma | Futures | Clay | (United States) Bjorn Fratangelo | (Italy) Lorenzo Frigerio (Italy) Matteo Trevisan | 3–6, 2–6 |
| Loss | 1–5 | Aug 2014 | US F23, Edwardsville | Futures | Hard | (United States) Bjorn Fratangelo | (United States) Patrick Davidson (India) Saketh Myneni | 3–6, 4–6 |
| Loss | 1–6 | Sep 2014 | Canada F9, Toronto | Futures | Clay | (United States) Bjorn Fratangelo | (United States) Sekou Bangoura (United States) Evan King | 4–6, 6–4, [9–11] |
| Win | 2–6 | Oct 2014 | Australia F6, Alice Springs | Futures | Hard | (United States) Jarmere Jenkins | (Australia) Dane Propoggia (United Kingdom) Brydan Klein | 6–4, 6–4 |
| Win | 3–6 | Oct 2014 | Australia F8, Toowoomba | Futures | Hard | (United States) Jarmere Jenkins | (Australia) Jake Eames (Australia) Christopher O'Connell | 6–2, 6–2 |
| Loss | 3–7 | Nov 2014 | Australia F9, Wollongong | Futures | Hard | (Australia) Andrew Whittington | (Australia) Steven de Waard (Australia) Marc Polmans | 6–7^{(2–7)}, 6–7^{(2–7)} |
| Win | 4–7 | Dec 2014 | Dominican Republic F4, Santo Domingo | Futures | Hard | (United States) Sekou Bangoura | (Peru) Mauricio Echazú (Bulgaria) Aleksandar Lazov | 6–7^{(1–7)}, 6–1, [10–8] |
| Loss | 4–8 | Mar 2015 | US F10, Bakersfield | Futures | Hard | (United States) Connor Smith | (United States) Sekou Bangoura (Barbados) Darian King | 4–6, 6–4, [7–10] |
| Loss | 4–9 | Jun 2016 | China F9, Jinan | Futures | Hard | (United States) Connor Smith | (Chinese Taipei) Peng Hsien-yin (China) Gong Maoxin | 6–7^{(2–7)}, 4–6 |
