= Miķelis Lībietis =

Latvian tennis player

- Country (sports): Latvia
- Residence: Cēsis, Latvia
- Born: 9 July 1992 (age 33) Sigulda, Latvia
- Height: 1.88 m (6 ft 2 in)
- Plays: Right Handed (Double Handed Backhand)
- Prize money: $ 77,759

Singles
- Career record: 1–7 (at ATP Tour level, Grand Slam level, and in Davis Cup)
- Career titles: 0; 0 Challenger, 6 Futures
- Highest ranking: No. 352 (28 November 2016)

Doubles
- Career record: 6–2 (at ATP Tour level, Grand Slam level, and in Davis Cup)
- Career titles: 0; 2 Challenger, 9 Futures
- Highest ranking: No. 138 (29 January 2024)

Miķelis Lībietis (born 9 July 1992 in Sigulda) is a Latvian tennis player that competes on the ATP Challenger Tour and the ITF Men's Circuit. Lībietis has a career high ATP singles ranking of No. 352 achieved on 28 November 2016 and a career high ATP doubles ranking of No. 138 achieved on 29 January 2024.

He played NCAA college tennis at the University of Tennessee, graduating with a degree in Sociology – Criminal Justice in May 2015.

== College career ==
Libietis arrived at Tennessee before the 2011–12 season and was one of four newcomers on the team, so he immediately found a role at the top of the lineup, a spot he has held for a majority of his All-American career.

As a sophomore in 2012–13, he earned the Intercollegiate Tennis Association national No. 1 ranking in singles and doubles with fellow sophomore Hunter Reese. He was the first Tennessee player in program history to hold both rankings simultaneously. He joined Andy Kohlberg, Paul Annacone, Chris Woodruff, John-Patrick Smith, and Rhyne Williams as Tennessee players to hold the No. 1 ranking.

In 2013–14, Libietis and Reese backed up their top national ranking by winning two major national titles. They won the ITA All-American Championships in October 2013. In May, they became the first Tennessee doubles team since 1980 to win the NCAA Doubles Championship, beating Ohio State's Peter Kobelt and Kevin Metka 7–6 (4), 6–7 (3), 7–6 (6).

During his final college season, Libietis and Reese became the first team to win back-to-back doubles titles at the ITA All-American Championships. They also won the 2014 Knoxville Challenger.

== Challenger finals ==
Legend
Grand Slam (0–0)
ATP Masters Series (0–0)
ATP Tour (0–0)
Challengers (4–5)

=== Doubles (4–5) ===
Outcome	W–L	Date	Tournament	Surface	Partner	Opponents	Score
Win	1–0	Nov 2014	Knoxville, USA	Hard (i)	(United States) Hunter Reese	(Portugal) Gastão Elias (United Kingdom) Sean Thornley	6–3, 6–4
Win	2–0	Sep 2016	Columbus, USA	Hard (i)	(United States) Dennis Novikov	(Canada) Philip Bester (Canada) Peter Polansky	7–5, 7–6^{(7–4)}
Loss	2–1	Sep 2017	Cary, USA	Hard	(United States) Dennis Novikov	(El Salvador) Marcelo Arévalo (Mexico) Miguel Ángel Reyes-Varela	7–6^{(8–6)}, 6–7^{(1–7)}, [6–10]
Loss	2–2	Oct 2017	Stockton, USA	Hard	(United States) Denis Kudla	(United Kingdom) Brydan Klein (United Kingdom) Joe Salisbury	2–6, 4–6
Loss	2–3	Nov 2017	Charlottesville, USA	Hard (i)	(Australia) Jarryd Chaplin	(United States) Denis Kudla (United States) Danny Thomas	7–6^{(7–4)}, 4–1 ret.
Loss	2–4	May 2023	Prague, Czech Republic	Clay	(United States) Hunter Reese	(France) Dan Added (France) Albano Olivetti	4–6, 3–6
Win	3–4	Jul 2023	Chicago, United States	Hard	(Tunisia) Skander Mansouri	(South Korea) Chung Yun-seong (Australia) Andrew Harris	7–6^{(7–5)}, 6–3
Win	4–4	Jul 2023	Granby, Canada	Hard	(United States) Christian Harrison	(Australia) Tristan Schoolkate (Australia) Adam Walton	6–4, 6–3
Loss	4–5	Jul 2023	Cary, United States	Hard	(Australia) Adam Walton	(United States) Evan King (United States) Reese Stalder	3–6, 6–7^{(4–7)}
