= Knoxville Challenger =

- 2025 Knoxville Challenger

ATP Challenger Tour
- Location: Knoxville, Tennessee, United States
- Venue: Goodfriend Tennis Center
- Category: ATP Challenger Tour
- Surface: Hard (Indoor)
- Draw: 32S/17Q/16D
- Prize money: $60,000 (2025), $75,000+H
- Website: Website

The Knoxville Challenger is a professional tennis tournament played on indoor hardcourts. It is currently part of the ATP Challenger Tour. It is held annually in Knoxville, Tennessee, United States, since 2000.

The Knoxville Challenger is held at Goodfriend Tennis Center on the campus of the University of Tennessee. The tournament is the second of three indoor Challenger tournaments at college venues to end the USTA Pro Circuit season. The Charlottesville Challenger (University of Virginia) is held the week before, and the Champaign Challenger (University of Illinois) is the week after.

== Past finals ==
=== Singles ===
Year	Champion	Runner-up	Score
2026	(France) Clément Chidekh	(Jordan) Abdullah Shelbayh	6–1, 2–0 ret.
2025	(United States) Mitchell Krueger	(United States) Darwin Blanch	6–7^{(2–7)}, 6–4, 6–1
2024	(United States) Christopher Eubanks	(United States) Learner Tien	7–5, 7–6^{(11–9)}
2023	(United States) Alex Michelsen	(United States) Denis Kudla	7–5, 4–6, 6–2
2022	(United States) Ben Shelton	(United States) Christopher Eubanks	6–3, 1–6, 7–6^{(7–4)}
2021	(United States) Christopher Eubanks	(Germany) Daniel Altmaier	6–3, 6–4
2020	Not held		
2019	(United States) Michael Mmoh	(Australia) Christopher O'Connell	6–4, 6–4
2018	(United States) Reilly Opelka	(United States) Bjorn Fratangelo	7–5, 4–6, 7–6^{(7–2)}
2017	(Canada) Filip Peliwo	(United States) Denis Kudla	6–4, 6–2
2016	(United States) Michael Mmoh	(Canada) Peter Polansky	7–5, 2–6, 6–1
2015	(United Kingdom) Daniel Evans	(United States) Frances Tiafoe	5–7, 6–1, 6–3
2014	(France) Adrian Mannarino	(Australia) Sam Groth	3–6, 7–6^{(8–6)}. 6-4
2013	(United States) Tim Smyczek	(Canada) Peter Polansky	6–4, 6–2
2012	(United States) Michael Russell	(United States) Bobby Reynolds	6–3, 6–2
2011	(United States) Jesse Levine	(United States) Brian Baker	6–2, 6–3
2010	(Japan) Kei Nishikori	(United States) Robert Kendrick	6–1, 6–4
2009	(United States) Taylor Dent	(Serbia) Ilija Bozoljac	6–3, 7–6(6)
2008	(United States) Bobby Reynolds	(Slovenia) Luka Gregorc	6–4, 6–2
2007	(United States) Robert Kendrick	(United States) Kevin Kim	3–6, 6–2, 6–4
2006 - 2003	Not Held		
2002	(Netherlands) Martin Verkerk	(United States) Mardy Fish	6–3, 6–4
2001	(United States) James Blake	(Romania) Gabriel Trifu	6–4, 6–4
2000	(Italy) Cristiano Caratti	(United States) Andy Roddick	3–6, 7–6, 6–4

=== Doubles ===
Year	Champions	Runners-up	Score
2026	(Netherlands) Jarno Jans (Belgium) Joran Vliegen	(Ecuador) Andy Andrade (Denmark) Johannes Ingildsen	7–5, 6–3
2025	(Australia) Patrick Harper (United States) Quinn Vandecasteele	(United States) Mitchell Krueger (Antigua and Barbuda) Jody Maginley	6–7^{(6–8)}, 7–6^{(7–4)}, [12–10]
2024	(Australia) Patrick Harper (United Kingdom) Johannus Monday	(United States) Micah Braswell (United States) Eliot Spizzirri	6–2, 6–2
2023	(United States) Cannon Kingsley (Venezuela) Luis David Martínez	(United States) Mac Kiger (United States) Mitchell Krueger	7–6^{(7–3)}, 6–3
2022	(United States) Hunter Reese (United States) Tennys Sandgren	(United States) Martin Damm (United States) Mitchell Krueger	6–7^{(4–7)}, 7–6^{(7–3)}, [10–5]
2021	(Tunisia) Malek Jaziri (Slovenia) Blaž Rola	(Mexico) Hans Hach Verdugo (Mexico) Miguel Ángel Reyes-Varela	3–6, 6–3, [10–5]
2020	Not held		
2019	(Mexico) Hans Hach Verdugo (Spain) Adrián Menéndez Maceiras	(United States) Bradley Klahn (Netherlands) Sem Verbeek	7–6^{(8–6)}, 4–6, [10–5]
2018	(Japan) Toshihide Matsui (Denmark) Frederik Nielsen	(United States) Hunter Reese (United States) Tennys Sandgren	7–6^{(8–6)}, 7–5
2017	(India) Leander Paes (India) Purav Raja	(United States) James Cerretani (Australia) John-Patrick Smith	7–6^{(7–4)}, 7–6^{(7–4)}
2016	(Canada) Peter Polansky (Canada) Adil Shamasdin	(Belgium) Ruben Bemelmans (Belgium) Joris De Loore	6–1, 6–3
2015	(Sweden) Johan Brunström (Denmark) Frederik Nielsen	(United States) Sekou Bangoura (United States) Matt Seeberger	6–1, 6–2
2014	(Latvia) Miķelis Lībietis (United States) Hunter Reese	(Portugal) Gastão Elias (United Kingdom) Sean Thornley	6–3, 6–4
2013	(Australia) Sam Groth (Australia) John-Patrick Smith	(Australia) Carsten Ball (Canada) Peter Polansky	6–7 (6), 6–2, [10-7]
2012	(United States) Alex Kuznetsov (Germany) Mischa Zverev	(South Africa) Jean Andersen (South Africa) Izak van der Merwe	6–4, 6–2
2011	(United States) Steve Johnson (United States) Austin Krajicek	(Australia) Adam Hubble (Denmark) Frederik Nielsen	3–6, 6–4, [13–11]
2010	(South Africa) Rik de Voest (South Africa) Izak van der Merwe	(United States) Alex Bogomolov Jr. (United States) Alex Kuznetsov	6–1, 6–4
2009	(Germany) Martin Emmrich (Sweden) Andreas Siljeström	(South Africa) Raven Klaasen (South Africa) Izak van der Merwe	7–5, 6–4
2008	(South Africa) Kevin Anderson (New Zealand) G.D. Jones	(United States) Andy Ram (United States) Bobby Reynolds	3–6, 6–0, [10–7]
2007	(Israel) Harel Levy (United States) Sam Warburg	(United Kingdom) Jamie Baker (United States) Brendan Evans	3–6, 6–2, [10–6]
2006 - 2003	Not Held		
2002	(Russia) Dmitry Tursunov (Netherlands) Martin Verkerk	(United States) Hugo Armando (Argentina) Sergio Roitman	6–3, 6–4
2001	(United States) Mardy Fish (United States) Jeff Morrison	(United States) Brandon Coupe (United States) Kelly Gullett	6–3, 6–0
2000	(Germany) Karsten Braasch (Germany) Michael Kohlmann	(South Africa) Jeff Coetzee (South Africa) Marcos Ondruska	6–0, 7–6
