= 2010 Fifth Third Bank Tennis Championships – Doubles =

Doubles
- 2010 Fifth Third Bank Tennis Championships

Final
- Champions: (South Africa) Raven Klaasen (South Africa) Izak van der Merwe
- Runners-up: (Australia) Kaden Hensel (Australia) Adam Hubble
- Score: 5–7, 6–4, [10–6]

Events
Singles	Doubles
- Fifth Third Bank Tennis Championships

Kevin Anderson and Ryler DeHeart are the defending champions, but both chose not to participate.
Raven Klaasen and Izak van der Merwe won in the final against Kaden Hensel and Adam Hubble 5–7, 6–4, [10–6].

== Seeds ==
1. (Philippines) Treat Conrad Huey / (United Kingdom) Dominic Inglot (semifinals)
2. (Australia) Kaden Hensel / (Australia) Adam Hubble (final)
3. (Denmark) Frederik Nielsen / (Australia) Joseph Sirianni (quarterfinals)
4. (Canada) Pierre-Ludovic Duclos / (United States) Nicholas Monroe (first round)

== Draw ==
Key

- Q = Qualifier
- WC = Wild card
- LL = Lucky loser
- Alt = Alternate
- ITF = ITF entry
- PR = Protected ranking
- SR = Special ranking
- SE = Special exempt
- JE = Junior exempt
- JR = Junior Accelerator Programme entrant
- CO = College Accelerator Programme entrant
- NG = Next Gen Accelerator Program entrant
- w/o = Walkover
- r = Retired
- d = Defaulted

=== Draw ===
First round
1	(Philippines) TC Huey (United Kingdom) D Inglot	6	6
(United States) Cory Parr (Canada) V Pospisil	3	4
WC	(United States) S Bangoura (United States) D Kudla	6	4	[10]
(Brazil) R Hocevar (Brazil) J Souza	1	6	[3]
3	(Denmark) F Nielsen (Australia) J Sirianni	4	6	[10]
(Chile) P Capdeville (China) Z Zhang	6	4	[3]
(China) M-X Gong (China) Z Li	4	4
(South Africa) R Klaasen (South Africa) I van der Merwe	6	6
(Canada) P Polansky (Canada) M Raonic	6	6
WC	(United States) Phillip Arndt (United States) J Morrison	4	0
(United States) A Bogomolov Jr. (United States) A Kuznetsov	0	6	[10]
4	(Canada) P-L Duclos (United States) N Monroe	6	4	[5]
(Japan) H Kondo (Japan) T Suzuki
(Lithuania) R Berankis (United States) J Levine	w/o
WC	(United States) Jarmere Jenkins (United States) A Krajicek	6^{4}	3
2	(Australia) K Hensel (Australia) A Hubble	7	6

Quarterfinals
1	(Philippines) TC Huey (United Kingdom) D Inglot	6	6
WC	(United States) S Bangoura (United States) D Kudla	2	2
3	(Denmark) F Nielsen (Australia) J Sirianni	3	5
(South Africa) R Klaasen (South Africa) I van der Merwe	6	7
(Canada) P Polansky (Canada) M Raonic	w/o
(United States) A Bogomolov Jr. (United States) A Kuznetsov
(Japan) H Kondo (Japan) T Suzuki	3	6	[2]
2	(Australia) K Hensel (Australia) A Hubble	6	3	[10]

Semifinals
1	(Philippines) TC Huey (United Kingdom) D Inglot	5	6	[7]
(South Africa) R Klaasen (South Africa) I van der Merwe	7	4	[10]
(United States) A Bogomolov Jr. (United States) A Kuznetsov	4	7	[8]
2	(Australia) K Hensel (Australia) A Hubble	6	6^{7}	[10]

Finals
(South Africa) R Klaasen (South Africa) I van der Merwe	5	6	[10]
2	(Australia) K Hensel (Australia) A Hubble	7	4	[6]
