= 2012 Erste Bank Open – Doubles =

Doubles
- 2012 Erste Bank Open

Final
- Champions: (Germany) Andre Begemann (Germany) Martin Emmrich
- Runners-up: (Austria) Julian Knowle (Slovakia) Filip Polášek
- Score: 6–4, 3–6, [10–4]

Details
- Draw: 16
- Seeds: 4

Events
Singles	Doubles
- Vienna Open

Bob Bryan and Mike Bryan were the defending champions but decided not to participate.
Andre Begemann and Martin Emmrich won the title, defeating Julian Knowle and Filip Polášek 6–4, 3–6, [10–4] in the final.

== Seeds ==
1. (Austria) Jürgen Melzer / (Austria) Alexander Peya (semifinals)
2. (Austria) Julian Knowle / (Slovakia) Filip Polášek (final)
3. (Philippines) Treat Conrad Huey / (United Kingdom) Dominic Inglot (first round)
4. (Germany) Dustin Brown / (Germany) Christopher Kas (first round)

== Draw ==
Key

- Q = Qualifier
- WC = Wild card
- LL = Lucky loser
- Alt = Alternate
- ITF = ITF entry
- PR = Protected ranking
- SR = Special ranking
- SE = Special exempt
- JE = Junior exempt
- JR = Junior Accelerator Programme entrant
- CO = College Accelerator Programme entrant
- NG = Next Gen Accelerator Program entrant
- w/o = Walkover
- r = Retired
- d = Defaulted

=== Draw ===
First round
1	(Austria) J Melzer (Austria) A Peya	7^{7}	6
(Germany) M Kohlmann (Belgium) D Norman	6^{3}	4
(Australia) M Ebden (Australia) M Matosevic	4	3
(Serbia) J Tipsarević (Germany) A Waske	6	6
4	(Germany) D Brown (Germany) C Kas	6^{5}	3
(Germany) A Begemann (Germany) M Emmrich	7^{7}	6
WC	(Austria) A Haider-Maurer (Austria) M Neuchrist	7^{7}	3	[8]
(Slovenia) A Bedene (Slovenia) G Žemlja	6^{5}	6	[10]
(United Kingdom) J Murray (Brazil) A Sá	7	6
(Slovakia) L Lacko (Slovakia) I Zelenay	5	3
WC	(Austria) M Fischer (Austria) P Oswald	6	6
3	(Philippines) TC Huey (United Kingdom) D Inglot	3	4
(Belgium) X Malisse (Luxembourg) G Müller	6^{2}	3
(Netherlands) R Haase (United States) J Levine	7^{7}	6
(Italy) F Fognini (Spain) D Marrero	7	4	[7]
2	(Austria) J Knowle (Slovakia) F Polášek	5	6	[10]

Quarterfinals
1	(Austria) J Melzer (Austria) A Peya	6^{4}	6	[10]
(Serbia) J Tipsarević (Germany) A Waske	7^{7}	4	[8]
(Germany) A Begemann (Germany) M Emmrich	6	6
(Slovenia) A Bedene (Slovenia) G Žemlja	4	3
(United Kingdom) J Murray (Brazil) A Sá	7^{8}	6
WC	(Austria) M Fischer (Austria) P Oswald	6^{6}	4
(Netherlands) R Haase (United States) J Levine	2	6^{4}
2	(Austria) J Knowle (Slovakia) F Polášek	6	7^{7}

Semifinals
1	(Austria) J Melzer (Austria) A Peya	6	3	[8]
(Germany) A Begemann (Germany) M Emmrich	4	6	[10]
(United Kingdom) J Murray (Brazil) A Sá	6^{3}	6^{2}
2	(Austria) J Knowle (Slovakia) F Polášek	7^{7}	7^{7}

Final
(Germany) A Begemann (Germany) M Emmrich	6	3	[10]
2	(Austria) J Knowle (Slovakia) F Polášek	4	6	[4]
