= 2012 Erste Bank Open – Singles =

Singles
- 2012 Erste Bank Open

Final
- Champion: (Argentina) Juan Martín del Potro
- Runner-up: (Slovenia) Grega Žemlja
- Score: 7–5, 6–3

Details
- Draw: 28
- Seeds: 8

Events
Singles	Doubles
- Vienna Open

Jo-Wilfried Tsonga was the defending champion but decided to compete at the If Stockholm Open instead.
Juan Martín del Potro won the title, defeating Grega Žemlja 7–5, 6–3 in the final.

== Seeds ==
The first four seeds received a bye into the second round.

1. (Argentina) Juan Martín del Potro (champion)
2. (Serbia) Janko Tipsarević (semifinals)
3. (Germany) Tommy Haas (quarterfinals)
4. (Austria) Jürgen Melzer (second round)
5. (Italy) Fabio Fognini (first round)
6. (Netherlands) Robin Haase (first round)
7. (France) Benoît Paire (first round)
8. (Belgium) Xavier Malisse (first round)

== Draw ==
Key

- Q = Qualifier
- WC = Wild card
- LL = Lucky loser
- Alt = Alternate
- ITF = ITF entry
- PR = Protected ranking
- SR = Special ranking
- SE = Special exempt
- JE = Junior exempt
- JR = Junior Accelerator Programme entrant
- CO = College Accelerator Programme entrant
- NG = Next Gen Accelerator Program entrant
- w/o = Walkover
- r = Retired
- d = Defaulted

=== Finals ===
Semifinals
1	(Argentina) Juan Martín del Potro	7^{7}	7^{7}
(Luxembourg) Gilles Müller	6^{4}	6^{5}
Q	(Slovenia) Grega Žemlja	3	7^{7}	6
2	(Serbia) Janko Tipsarević	6	6^{5}	2

Final
1	(Argentina) Juan Martín del Potro	7	6
Q	(Slovenia) Grega Žemlja	5	3

=== Top half ===
First round
Q	(Germany) D Brands	6^{5}	6	6
Q	(Belgium) R Bemelmans	7^{7}	4	3
WC	(Austria) D Thiem	7^{7}	6
(Slovakia) L Lacko	6^{3}	3
(Australia) M Matosevic	1	6	6
6	(Netherlands) R Haase	6	3	2
(Belgium) S Darcis	7^{7}	4	3
(Luxembourg) G Müller	6^{3}	6	6
Q	(Canada) V Pospisil	3	7^{7}	6
WC	(Austria) A Haider-Maurer	6	6^{3}	1
(Italy) P Lorenzi	6	6
7	(France) B Paire	4	4

Second round
1	(Argentina) JM del Potro	6^{5}	7^{7}	7^{8}
Q	(Germany) D Brands	7^{7}	6^{4}	6^{6}
WC	(Austria) D Thiem	3	6^{5}
(Australia) M Matosevic	6	7^{7}
4	(Austria) J Melzer	3	6	6^{4}
(Luxembourg) G Müller	6	3	7^{7}
Q	(Canada) V Pospisil	4	4
(Italy) P Lorenzi	6	6

Quarterfinals
1	(Argentina) JM del Potro	6	6
(Australia) M Matosevic	2	2
(Luxembourg) G Müller	6	6
(Italy) P Lorenzi	3	4

Semifinals
1	(Argentina) JM del Potro	7^{7}	7^{7}
(Luxembourg) G Müller	6^{4}	6^{5}

=== Bottom half ===
First round
8	(Belgium) X Malisse	6	1	6^{6}
Q	(Slovenia) G Žemlja	4	6	7^{8}
(Australia) M Ebden	7	0	6
(Italy) F Volandri	5	6	0
(Poland) Ł Kubot	3	4
(United States) J Levine	6	6
5	(Italy) F Fognini	6^{8}	3
(United States) D Young	7^{10}	6
(Slovenia) A Bedene	6	1
(Spain) G García-López	4	0^{r}
WC	(Latvia) E Gulbis	7^{8}	6
PR	(India) S Devvarman	6^{6}	3

Second round
Q	(Slovenia) G Žemlja	7	6
(Australia) M Ebden	5	4
(United States) J Levine	4	2
3	(Germany) T Haas	6	6
(United States) D Young	6^{4}	7^{7}	3
(Slovenia) A Bedene	7^{7}	6^{2}	6
WC	(Latvia) E Gulbis	3	4
2	(Serbia) J Tipsarević	6	6

Quarterfinals
Q	(Slovenia) G Žemlja	6	4	6
3	(Germany) T Haas	4	6	2
(Slovenia) A Bedene	2	2^{r}
2	(Serbia) J Tipsarević	6	4

Semifinals
Q	(Slovenia) G Žemlja	3	7^{7}	6
2	(Serbia) J Tipsarević	6	6^{5}	2

== Qualifying ==
=== Seeds ===
1. (Slovenia) Grega Žemlja (qualified)
2. (Belgium) Ruben Bemelmans (qualified)
3. (Canada) Vasek Pospisil (qualified)
4. (Germany) Daniel Brands (qualified)
5. (Germany) Matthias Bachinger (qualifying competition)
6. (France) Florent Serra (first round)
7. (Germany) Dustin Brown (qualifying competition)
8. (France) Adrian Mannarino (first round)

=== Qualifiers ===
1. (Slovenia) Grega Žemlja
2. (Belgium) Ruben Bemelmans
3. (Canada) Vasek Pospisil
4. (Germany) Daniel Brands

=== Draw ===
==== First qualifier ====
First round
(Spain) Arnau Brugués-Davi	7	6
(Italy) Riccardo Bellotti	5	4
(Slovakia) Ivo Klec	7	6
(Slovakia) Filip Havaj	5	4
(Czech Republic) Jan Minář	6^{6}	6	6
6	(France) Florent Serra	7^{8}	4	3

Second round
1	(Slovenia) Grega Žemlja	6	6
(Spain) Arnau Brugués-Davi	2	2
(Slovakia) Ivo Klec	7	4	3
(Czech Republic) Jan Minář	5	6	6

Qualifying competition
1	(Slovenia) Grega Žemlja	6	7
(Czech Republic) Jan Minář	4	5

==== Second qualifier ====
First round
WC	(Spain) David Marrero	4	3
(Austria) Philipp Oswald	6	6
(Spain) Daniel Muñoz de la Nava	4	6	7
(Turkey) Marsel İlhan	6	3	5
(Germany) Peter Gojowczyk	6	6
8	(France) Adrian Mannarino	2	3

Second round
2	(Belgium) Ruben Bemelmans	7	6
(Austria) Philipp Oswald	5	4
(Spain) Daniel Muñoz de la Nava	5	6^{4}
(Germany) Peter Gojowczyk	7	7^{7}

Qualifying competition
2	(Belgium) Ruben Bemelmans	6	6
(Germany) Peter Gojowczyk	2	4

==== Third qualifier ====
First round
(Czech Republic) Ivo Minář	6	6
(Austria) Gibril Diarra	3	2
(Austria) Nicolas Reissig	2	2
(Austria) Martin Fischer	6	6
(Croatia) Mate Pavić	3	2
7	(Germany) Dustin Brown	6	6

Second round
3	(Canada) Vasek Pospisil	6	6
(Czech Republic) Ivo Minář	2	4
(Austria) Martin Fischer	3	6	1
7	(Germany) Dustin Brown	6	3	6

Qualifying competition
3	(Canada) Vasek Pospisil	6^{5}	6	6
7	(Germany) Dustin Brown	7^{7}	0	3

==== Fourth qualifier ====
First round
4	(Germany) Daniel Brands	6	6
(Czech Republic) Jan Hernych	4	2
(Austria) Maximilian Neuchrist	6	6
(Austria) Michael Eibl	1	4
WC	(Germany) Christopher Kas	6	6
(Austria) Lucas Miedler	2	2
(Austria) Pascal Brunner	4	1
5	(Germany) Matthias Bachinger	6	6

Second round
4	(Germany) Daniel Brands	6	6
(Austria) Maximilian Neuchrist	4	4
WC	(Germany) Christopher Kas	1	2
5	(Germany) Matthias Bachinger	6	6

Qualifying competition
4	(Germany) Daniel Brands	7^{7}	2	6
5	(Germany) Matthias Bachinger	6^{4}	6	3
