= 2009 U.S. Men's Clay Court Championships – Singles =

Singles
- 2009 U.S. Men's Clay Court Championships

Final
- Champion: (Australia) Lleyton Hewitt
- Runner-up: (United States) Wayne Odesnik
- Score: 6–2, 7–5

Details
- Draw: 32
- Seeds: 8

Events
Singles	Doubles
- U.S. Men's Clay Court Championships

Lleyton Hewitt beat Wayne Odesnik in the final, 6–2, 7–5.

== Seeds ==
1. (United States) James Blake (first round)
2. (United States) Mardy Fish (first round)
3. (Austria) Jürgen Melzer (second round)
4. (France) Jérémy Chardy (second round)
5. (United States) Sam Querrey (withdrew due to leg injury)
6. (Spain) Marcel Granollers (second round)
7. (Argentina) Diego Junqueira (first round)
8. (Argentina) Máximo González (first round)

== Draw ==
Key

- Q = Qualifier
- WC = Wild card
- LL = Lucky loser
- Alt = Alternate
- ITF = ITF entry
- PR = Protected ranking
- SR = Special ranking
- SE = Special exempt
- JE = Junior exempt
- JR = Junior Accelerator Programme entrant
- CO = College Accelerator Programme entrant
- NG = Next Gen Accelerator Program entrant
- w/o = Walkover
- r = Retired
- d = Defaulted

=== Finals ===
Semifinals
(Russia) Evgeny Korolev	6^{4}	4
(Australia) Lleyton Hewitt	7	6
(United States) Wayne Odesnik	6	6
(Germany) Björn Phau	4	3

Final
(Australia) Lleyton Hewitt	6	7
(United States) Wayne Odesnik	2	5

=== Top half ===
First round
1	(United States) J Blake	4	4
(Argentina) G Cañas	6	6
WC	(United States) T Dent	4	6	6
(Brazil) M Daniel	6	3	2
(Russia) E Korolev	7	2	7
(Argentina) L Mayer	6^{2}	6	5
(Spain) D Gimeno Traver	6	3	6
8	(Argentina) M González	4	6	1
4	(France) J Chardy	6	6
LL	(United States) J Levine	3	0
(Spain) G García López	1	6	6
Q	(Ecuador) G Lapentti	6	0	2
(Argentina) S Roitman	6	6
(Argentina) A Calleri	3	3
(Australia) L Hewitt	6	6
7	(Argentina) D Junqueira	0	2

Second round
(Argentina) G Cañas	6	6
WC	(United States) T Dent	2	2
(Russia) E Korolev	6	7
(Spain) D Gimeno Traver	3	6^{4}
4	(France) J Chardy	1	0
(Spain) G García López	6	6
(Argentina) S Roitman	1	3
(Australia) L Hewitt	6	6

Quarterfinals
(Argentina) G Cañas	6	3	4
(Russia) E Korolev	2	6	6
(Spain) G García López	3	4
(Australia) L Hewitt	6	6

Semifinals
(Russia) E Korolev	6^{4}	4
(Australia) L Hewitt	7	6

=== Bottom half ===
First round
LL	(United States) A Delić	7	6^{5}	1
(Chile) P Capdeville	6^{5}	7	6
WC	(United States) J Isner	4	6	6
Q	(United States) M Russell	6	3	2
(South Africa) K Anderson	6^{2}	4
(United States) W Odesnik	7	6
(United States) R Kendrick	1	5
3	(Austria) J Melzer	6	7
6	(Spain) M Granollers	2	6	6
(Argentina) B Dabul	6	4	1
WC	(Germany) T Haas	6	6
(Germany) D Gremelmayr	3	3
Q	(Austria) A Peya	6	4	3
Q	(United States) S Jenkins	0	6	6
(Germany) B Phau	6	5	6
2	(United States) M Fish	3	7	3

Second round
(Chile) P Capdeville	6	6^{1}	6^{5}
WC	(United States) J Isner	4	7	7
(United States) W Odesnik	6	6
3	(Austria) J Melzer	4	0
6	(Spain) M Granollers	6	2	3
WC	(Germany) T Haas	4	6	6
Q	(United States) S Jenkins	4	6^{2}
(Germany) B Phau	6	7

Quarterfinals
WC	(United States) J Isner	5	6	6^{5}
(United States) W Odesnik	7	3	7
WC	(Germany) T Haas	3	6	3
(Germany) B Phau	6	3	6

Semifinals
(United States) W Odesnik	6	6
(Germany) B Phau	4	3

== Qualifying ==
=== Seeds ===
1. (United States) Kevin Kim (second round)
2. (Canada) Jesse Levine (qualifying competition, lucky loser)
3. (Bosnia and Herzegovina) Amer Delić (qualifying competition, lucky loser)
4. (United States) Donald Young (qualifying competition)
5. (United States) Ryan Sweeting (second round)
6. (Ecuador) Giovanni Lapentti (qualified)
7. (Austria) Alexander Peya (qualified)
8. (United States) Scoville Jenkins (qualified)

=== Qualifiers ===
1. (United States) Michael Russell
2. (Austria) Alexander Peya
3. (Ecuador) Giovanni Lapentti
4. (United States) Scoville Jenkins

=== Lucky losers ===
1. (Canada) Jesse Levine
2. (Bosnia and Herzegovina) Amer Delić

=== Draw ===
==== First qualifier ====
First round				Second round					Qualifying competition
				1	(United States) Kevin Kim	3	3
(New Zealand) Artem Sitak	2	3			(Serbia) Filip Krajinović	6	6
(Serbia) Filip Krajinović	6	6							(Serbia) Filip Krajinović	1	2
(Slovenia) Luka Gregorc	3	6	3						(United States) Michael Russell	6	6
(United States) Michael Russell	6	1	6		(United States) Michael Russell	6	3	7
				5	(United States) Ryan Sweeting	1	6	5

==== Second qualifier ====
First round
WC	(United States) Daniel Whitehead	1	3
(United States) Phillip Simmonds	6	6
(Chile) Sebastian Rivera	6	2	2
(Moldova) Roman Borvanov	4	6	6
WC	(United States) Harry Fowler	1	1
7	(Austria) Alexander Peya	6	6

Second round
2	(Canada) Jesse Levine	6	6^{2}	7^{7}
(United States) Phillip Simmonds	2	7^{7}	6^{5}
(Moldova) Roman Borvanov	2	4
7	(Austria) Alexander Peya	6	6

Qualifying competition
2	(Canada) Jesse Levine	2	2
7	(Austria) Alexander Peya	6	6

==== Third qualifier ====
First round
(New Zealand) Rubin Statham	7^{7}	2	3
(Argentina) Gustavo Marcaccio	6^{5}	6	6
(United States) David Martin	6	6
(United States) Geoff Gehrke	0	1
(United States) Eric Nunez	2	3
6	(Ecuador) Giovanni Lapentti	6	6

Second round
3	(Bosnia and Herzegovina) Amer Delić	6	6
(Argentina) Gustavo Marcaccio	3	1
(United States) David Martin	6^{5}	2
6	(Ecuador) Giovanni Lapentti	7^{7}	6

Qualifying competition
3	(Bosnia and Herzegovina) Amer Delić	3	5
6	(Ecuador) Giovanni Lapentti	6	7

==== Fourth qualifier ====
First round
WC	(United States) Ben Chen	1	2
(United States) Brett Joelson	6	6
(Serbia) Dušan Vemić	7^{7}	6
(Argentina) Gastón Gaudio	6^{4}	4
(United States) Stephen Bass	3	6	3
8	(United States) Scoville Jenkins	6	0	6

Second round
4	(United States) Donald Young	6	6
(United States) Brett Joelson	3	2
(Serbia) Dušan Vemić	4	0
8	(United States) Scoville Jenkins	6	6

Qualifying competition
4	(United States) Donald Young	4	4
8	(United States) Scoville Jenkins	6	6
