= 2012 Challenger of Dallas – Doubles =

Doubles
- 2012 Challenger of Dallas

Final
- Champions: (United Kingdom) Chris Eaton (United Kingdom) Dominic Inglot
- Runners-up: (United States) Nicholas Monroe (United States) Jack Sock
- Score: 6–7^{(6–8)}, 6–4, [19–17]

Events
Singles	Doubles
- Challenger of Dallas

Scott Lipsky and Rajeev Ram were the defending champions but decided not to participate.

Chris Eaton and Dominic Inglot won the title, defeating Nicholas Monroe and Jack Sock in the final, 6–7^{(6–8)}, 6–4, [19–17].

== Seeds ==
1. (Australia) Carsten Ball / (Canada) Adil Shamasdin (quarterfinals)
2. (United States) James Cerretani / (South Africa) Izak van der Merwe (first round)
3. (Germany) Andre Begemann / (Canada) Pierre-Ludovic Duclos (quarterfinals)
4. (United States) Nicholas Monroe / (United States) Jack Sock (final)

== Draw ==
Key

- Q = Qualifier
- WC = Wild card
- LL = Lucky loser
- Alt = Alternate
- ITF = ITF entry
- PR = Protected ranking
- SR = Special ranking
- SE = Special exempt
- JE = Junior exempt
- JR = Junior Accelerator Programme entrant
- CO = College Accelerator Programme entrant
- NG = Next Gen Accelerator Program entrant
- w/o = Walkover
- r = Retired
- d = Defaulted

=== Draw ===
First round
1	(Australia) C Ball (Canada) A Shamasdin	6	6
WC	(United States) Mitchell Krueger (United States) Shane Vinsant	3	4
(United States) S Querrey (United States) C Wettengel	5	3
(United States) R Kendrick (The Bahamas) M Knowles	7	6
3	(Germany) A Begemann (Canada) P-L Duclos	6	6
(Belgium) S Darcis (France) J Eysseric	2	3
(United States) Greg Ouellette (United States) M Sykut	3	7^{7}	[9]
(United Kingdom) C Eaton (United Kingdom) D Inglot	6	6^{4}	[11]
(United States) R Ginepri (United States) T Rettenmaier	1	3
(United States) D Kudla (United States) J Levine	6	6
Q	(India) Y Bhambri (Serbia) V Obradović	4	3
4	(United States) N Monroe (United States) J Sock	6	6
(United States) A Kuznetsov (Germany) M Zverev	6	6
LL	(United States) Christopher James Price (United States) John Wiegand	3	2
WC	(United States) Adham El-Effendi (United Kingdom) D Walsh	6	7^{7}
2	(United States) J Cerretani (South Africa) I van der Merwe	4	6^{4}

Quarterfinals
1	(Australia) C Ball (Canada) A Shamasdin	6	5	[9]
(United States) R Kendrick (The Bahamas) M Knowles	4	7	[11]
3	(Germany) A Begemann (Canada) P-L Duclos	6^{4}	5
(United Kingdom) C Eaton (United Kingdom) D Inglot	7^{7}	7
(United States) D Kudla (United States) J Levine	3	2
4	(United States) N Monroe (United States) J Sock	6	6
(United States) A Kuznetsov (Germany) M Zverev	4	6	[10]
WC	(United States) A El-Effendi (United Kingdom) D Walsh	6	3	[5]

Semifinals
(United States) R Kendrick (The Bahamas) M Knowles	6	6^{5}	[8]
(United Kingdom) C Eaton (United Kingdom) D Inglot	4	7^{7}	[10]
4	(United States) N Monroe (United States) J Sock	7^{7}	7^{7}
(United States) A Kuznetsov (Germany) M Zverev	6^{5}	6^{4}

Final
(United Kingdom) C Eaton (United Kingdom) D Inglot	6^{6}	6	[19]
4	(United States) N Monroe (United States) J Sock	7^{8}	4	[17]
