= Foreign policy of the Stephen Harper government =

The foreign policy of Stephen Harper was Canada's foreign policy of the Conservative government led by Prime Minister Stephen Harper (in office February 6, 2006 – November 4, 2015). It has been characterized as a great break from the previous 70 years of post-war Canadian diplomacy. Indeed, Harper moved away from the multilateral and internationalist policies of the Liberal Party, and reduced Canada's emphasis on the United Nations, peacekeeping, conflict resolution, and multilateralism.

Harper sought to strengthen cooperation with the United States, particularly in that country's war on terror. As part of this policy, his government continued and expanded Canada's participation in the US-led War in Afghanistan. Harper also led Canada in the Libyan civil war and the Syrian civil war. In parallel, Harper showed relentless support for Israel throughout his whole premiership.

== General aspects ==
Commentators generally agree that Stephen Haper's foreign policy differed largely from his predecessors. The switch essentially ended Canada's posture as a country encouraging peacekeeping, conflict resolution, multilateralism, and the post-war world order. There are, however, few defining aspects of Harper's foreign policy, outside of an increased interest in international trade and relentless support of Israel. This led University of Ottawa professor Roland Paris to reject the claim that Harper's foreign policy was ideological, instead arguing that it was "incoherent". Even at the 2013 Manning Conference, there was a consensus among foreign policy panelists that "the government, and the broader conservative movement from which it springs, don't so much have a foreign policy as a vague foreign-policy vision, dressed up with a mish-mash of policy ideas."

According to Toronto Star commentator Eugene Lang, Harper's foreign policy had been "all war, no diplomacy". He points to the fact during Harper's premiership, "the Canadian Armed Forces have had their most active period in living memory". Indeed, Harper had increased Canadian presence in Afghanistan and took part in conflicts in Libya and Syria. Lang argues that Harper overused the military and underused diplomatic channels to achieve Canada's goal of promoting peace.

According to Andrew Nikiforuk of The Tyee, Harper's foreign policy should be analyzed as a tool used to shore up votes from different immigrant community groups within Canada which can swing elections in certain districts. Nikiforuk points to Harper's denunciation of human rights abuses in Sri Lanka as a way to win the support of Toronto's Tamil community. He also notes that Harper's support for Israel "through fire and water", as he told the Knesset, helped him win the support of the majority of Canadian Jews in the 2011 federal election. This was a community that reliably voted for the Liberal Party in previous elections. Nikiforuk concluded that Haper had a "Diaspora-driven foreign policy".

=== Personnel ===
Harper's first Minister of Foreign Affairs was Peter MacKay. On 14 August 2007, MacKay was replaced as Minister of Foreign Affairs by Maxime Bernier in a cabinet shuffle. Mackay was appointed as Minister of National Defence. On 26 May 2008, Bernier resigned and was replaced by David Emerson. Following the 2008 Canadian federal election, Lawrence Cannon became foreign minister. Following the 2011 Canadian federal election, John Baird became foreign minister. On 3 February 2015, Baird resigned and was replaced by Rob Nicholson.

== Relations with the United States ==
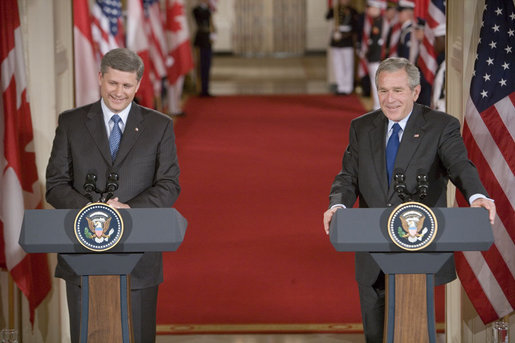
Stephen Harper and George W. Bush hold a joint press conference at the White House on July 6, 2006

Relations with the United States are always a central issue in Canada, and the period prior to Harper's premiership was criticized by Kim Richard Nossal for "the lamentably awkward and embarrassingly public handling of the continental relationship." He blames Canadian politicians for "firing off verbal pot‐shots at American expense – a temptation to which they have succumbed even when they have been perfectly aware that their doing so can serve no useful Canadian purpose, much less exert a constructive influence on American behaviour."

In contrast, during the 2006 election campaign, Harper promised to improve relations with United States, blaming the previous Liberal government of damaging the relationship due to inappropriate comments made towards the George W. Bush administration.

However, shortly after being congratulated by George W. Bush for his victory, Harper rebuked U.S. Ambassador to Canada David Wilkins for criticizing the Conservatives' plans to assert Canada's sovereignty over the Arctic Ocean waters through an increased presence by the Canadian Forces.

=== U.S. Ambassador ===
On February 16, 2006, Harper named former Progressive Conservative Party Cabinet Minister Michael Wilson as Governor General Michaëlle Jean's appointee to the post of Canada's Ambassador to the United States, replacing Liberal appointee Frank McKenna.

Wilson stated in his first press conference as Ambassador that "Softwood lumber is clearly at the top of the heap, the top priority."

=== First meeting with U.S. President Bush ===
Harper's first meeting with the U.S. president occurred on March 30, 2006; and while little was achieved in the way of solid agreements, the trip was described in the media as signaling a trend of closer relations between the two nations. Harper told the press that he used "colourful language not suitable for public television" when pressing President Bush privately over his opposition to a U.S. law that will require Canadian citizens to show their passport when crossing the border into the United States. Bush reported that Harper was "a very open, straightforward fella.... If he's got a problem, he's willing to express it in a way that's clear for all to understand, and that's the way I like to deal with people." The two would later meet in July at the White House.

=== Softwood lumber dispute ===
On April 27, 2006, Harper announced in Parliament that the government had reached a seven-year agreement with the United States in the nations' long-standing feud over softwood lumber. Trade Minister David Emerson had vowed since its post-election defection from the Liberals to the Tories to deal with the issue as soon as possible while Ambassador Wilson mentioned it as its first priority.

The three major softwood-producing provinces—British Columbia, Ontario, and Quebec—accepted the compromise. Leader of the Opposition Bill Graham and NDP leader Jack Layton did not, criticizing the deal for not requiring the U.S. to pay back all $5 billion it had collected in tariffs on Canadian softwood lumber.

On September 12, 2006, the Canadian and U.S. governments officially signed the deal in Ottawa ending the dispute. Still, it was subject for a confidence vote in the House of Commons during the fall session. The deal would likely have passed with the support of the Bloc Québécois. On September 19, the House voted in favor of the deal 172 to 116 in first reading which eliminated its final hurdle until its official realization

However, Canada has not fully complied to all conditions of the deal before October 1, 2006, the deadline date for both countries to comply.

=== NORAD ===
In 2006, following a debate and vote in the House of Commons, the Harper government renewed the NORAD (North American Aerospace Defense Command, initially created in 1957) agreement with the United States, making it permanent and adding maritime defense to the agreement, which previously covered only air defense. The additional coverage was a response to the increasing threat of mass terror attacks, and scenarios that included maritime dimensions. The NDP, which traditionally takes a pacifist position and has historically been opposed to Canadian participation in NORAD, was highly critical of the agreement, arguing that the arrangement will reduce Canadian sovereignty over the country's internal waters.

=== Anti-ballistic missile defense ===
Previously, the federal government under PM Brian Mulroney decided against participation in the U.S. led anti-missile defense system which was designed to intercept foreign missiles armed with nuclear weapons. This program, known as the Strategic Defense Initiative, was started by President Ronald Reagan in the 1980s. As part of the effort to improve cooperation with the US, Harper reopened the issue, and agreed to a free-vote on the participation of Canada.

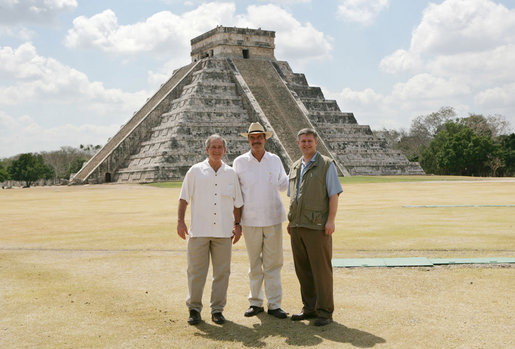
U.S. president George W. Bush, Mexico's president Vicente Fox and Canada's prime minister Stephen Harper, right, stand in front of the Chichen-Itza archaeological ruins Thursday, March 30, 2006.

=== Passport and border security ===
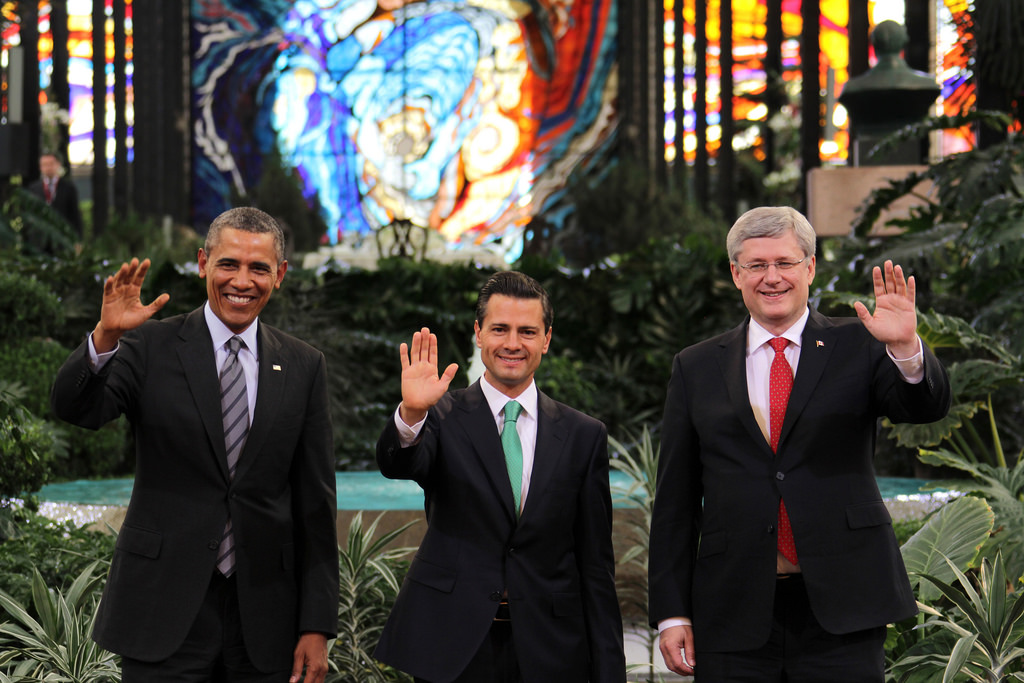
Harper, Mexican president Peña Nieto, and U.S. president Barack Obama, 2014

In 2007, the United States government adopted the Western Hemisphere Travel Initiative as part of the anti-terror measures adopted after the 9/11 al-Qaeda terror attacks. This law went into effect in 2009, and required all Canadian and American citizens to use a valid passport in order to enter the United States by land or water, supplementing the earlier requirement for air-travelers. Canada's Ambassador to the U.S. Michael Wilson expressed concerns that the accelerated implementation could cause problems for businesses and travelers. (Wilson previously said in an interview on CTV's Question Period in July 2006 that the economy would not be greatly affected by the new measure, but the Federation of Canadian Municipalities continued to express concern.)

Several provincial premiers including Ontario's Dalton McGuinty, New Brunswick's Shawn Graham and Manitoba's Gary Doer lobbied U.S. contacts in order to propose alternatives to the passport, such as dedicated digital identify documents.

As a result of the new US policy, the demand for passports grew rapidly, creating a backlog which caused lengthy delays. The government then adopted measures to speed up the process.

In 2006, the Harper government announced several enhanced border security measures, including a plan to equip security personnel with weapons in order to be able to act effectively against suspects, including those carrying firearms, near the border (on either side). The guards had requested the weapons in a previous negotiation. The Harper government budgeted over $C100 million for additional staff to patrol borders, including 400 new officers.

=== Maher Arar ===
On January 26, 2007, the government announced a compensation worth $11.5 million to Syrian-Canadian Maher Arar due to an error from the Royal Canadian Mounted Police. The RCMP was blamed for giving misleading information to U.S. officials and suspected him as a possible terrorist threat and a member of the Islamic terrorist group Al-Qaeda. He was arrested in New York in 2002 and later deported to Syria where he was tortured in a Syrian jail. The government also gave official apologies. Public Safety Minister Stockwell Day criticized the U.S. authorities for not removing Arar on a terrorist watch list based on information from the CIA. U.S. Ambassador to Canada David Wilkins replied that Canada must not dictate to the United States on who is not allowed in the country.

=== First meeting with U.S. President Obama ===
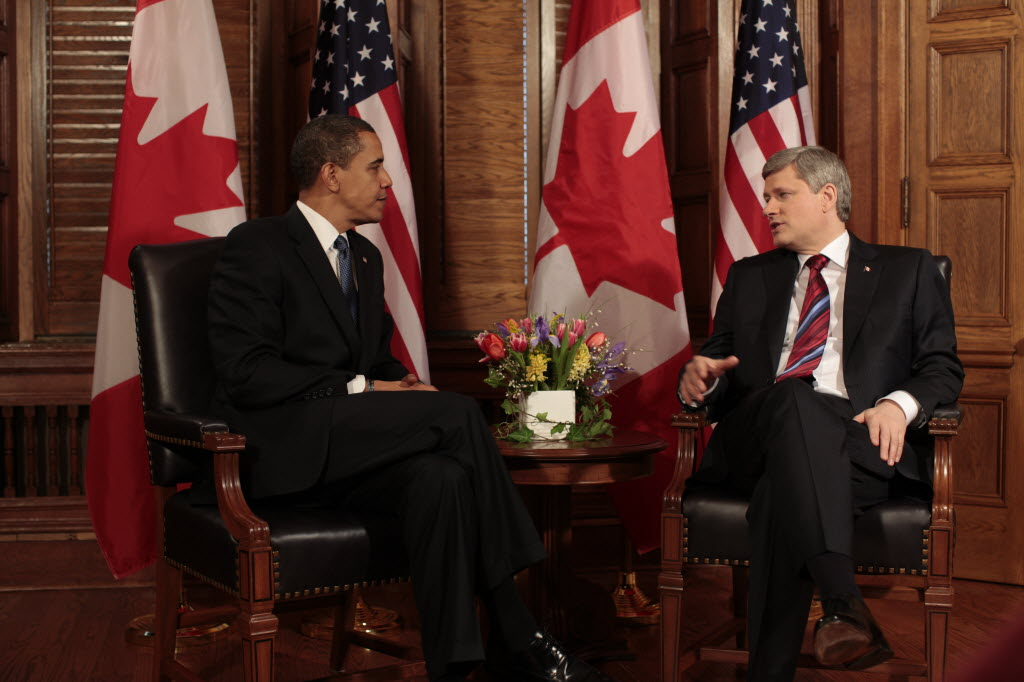
Harper with US President Barack Obama on February 19, 2009

Harper met for the first time, newly sworn US president Barack Obama on February 19, 2009, at the Parliament. During the short meeting, the war in Afghanistan, the struggling economy, fears of protectionism and the environment were the main topics discussed. The Americans did not ask Canada to extend the mission in Afghanistan beyond 2011. Both leaders agreed that the two countries should adopt a shared approach on the ongoing global economic slowdown, as well as tackling the global warming. A "clean-energy dialogue" was also created and Harper told Obama that the plan would commit: " senior officials from both countries to collaborate on the development of clean energy science and technologies that will reduce greenhouse gases and combat climate change".

== Arctic lands and waters ==
External image
- Map identifying baselines and territorial sea in the Canadian Arctic islands; retrieved 25 March 2017

Harper declared in early 2006 that the Arctic waters that are located between the Canadian islands of the Nunavut and Northwest territories belongs to Canada. However, U.S. officials, including newly named U.S. Ambassador to Canada David Wilkins, said that those waters were in neutral territory. During the summer of 2006, Harper went to the Arctic region in Alert, Nunavut to defend the country's northern sovereignty not only for the neutral territory issue but also due to the greater attention given by foreign countries in regards of the land's wide variety of resources. In addition, the government planned to continue funding new military ships and additional personnel to patrol and defend the northern waters. In 2008, he added that Canada should extend its jurisdictional reach to 200 nautical miles (370 km) up from the current 100 miles (160 km) On August 10, 2007, Harper announced that a new Army training centre will be built in Resolute Bay as well as an increase of military personnel while a new military port will be built in Nanisvik. In addition, Harper announced $720 million for the construction of a new icebreaker that will be named after former prime minister John Diefenbaker and will be in operation in 2017.

Under the United Nations Convention on the Law of the Sea (UNCLOS), a country has a ten-year period to make claims to an extended continental shelf which, if validated, gives it exclusive rights to resources on or below the seabed of that extended shelf area. Canada ratified UNCLOS on 7 November 2003 and had through 2013 to file its claim to an extended continental shelf. As of December 2013, Canada had announced that it would file a claim which includes the North Pole. Canada planned to submit their claim to a portion of the Arctic continental shelf in 2018.

In response to the Russian Arktika 2007 expedition, Canada's Foreign Affairs Minister Peter MacKay said "[t]his is posturing. This is the true North, strong and free, and they're fooling themselves if they think dropping a flag on the ocean floor is going to change anything... This isn't the 14th or 15th century." In response, Sergey Lavrov, the Russian Minister of Foreign Affairs, stated "when pioneers reach a point hitherto unexplored by anybody, it is customary to leave flags there. Such was the case on the Moon, by the way... [W]e from the outset said that this expedition was part of the big work being carried out under the UN Convention on the Law of the Sea, within the international authority where Russia's claim to submerged ridges which we believe to be an extension of our shelf is being considered. We know that this has to be proved. The ground samples that were taken will serve the work to prepare that evidence."

On 25 September 2007, Harper said he was assured by Russian president Vladimir Putin that neither offence nor "violation of international understanding or any Canadian sovereignty" was intended. Harper promised to defend Canada's claimed sovereignty by building and operating up to eight Arctic patrol ships, a new army training centre in Resolute Bay, and the refurbishing of an existing deepwater port at a former mining site in Nanisivik.

== War in Afghanistan ==
=== Deployment in Afghanistan ===
The Canadian government has participated in the war against terrorism since the September 11 attacks in the United States. Later that year, the government deployed troops in Afghanistan to combat the Taliban regime, which was ousted by the coalition forces. Canadian troops have remained in the area to assure security and peace, as Taliban insurgencies were frequent in the following months. So far, 133 Canadian soldiers and a diplomat (as of December 25, 2009) have been killed in Afghanistan, with most of the fatalities occurring in 2006 and 2007 as Taliban attacks have become more frequent and more violent. Since the Conservative government was elected in 2006, several of the key members of the Cabinet, including Prime Minister Stephen Harper, Foreign Affairs Minister Peter MacKay, Minister of National Defence Gordon O'Connor and Minister of International Co-operation Josee Verner have visited the region in support of the troops or for rebuilding projects. Defence Chief of Staff Rick Hillier also visited the troops in Afghanistan in December 2006.

On a two-day visit in Afghanistan in early January 2007, MacKay mentioned that there was an optimistic future in the country despite the Taliban resistance and violence. He mentioned that Canada and its military is heavily contributing to the redevelopment and reconstruction of the area and that several major projects and programs are currently underway including infrastructures and micro-credit programs. He also announced funding for both aid worker groups and for developing security in Afghanistan, including developing the police force. He added another $200 million in aid on February 26, 2007, for the reconstruction. In October 2007, Maxime Bernier and Bev Oda, who were named respectively the Ministers for Foreign Affairs and International Co-operation during the summer of 2007, pledged an additional $25 million in food aid for the Afghan people in the areas affected by the Taliban militant presence.

=== Mission extension ===
In early 2006, the Conservative government proposed a motion to extend the Canadian military mission in Afghanistan by two years. In May 2006, the House of Commons passed a motion, after a six-hour debate, to extend the mission until 2009 by a slim 149–145 majority.

On April 24, 2007, a Liberal motion to withdraw troops by 2009 was defeated 150–134, by the Conservatives and the NDP. The NDP wanted an immediate withdrawal of the troops. Former Defence Minister Gordon O'Connor stated that troops may be needed until 2010. Peter MacKay, who've in a cabinet shuffle replaced O'Connor following heavy criticism of the latter's handling on the mission, stated that the government is willing to continue the mission until Canada "finish the job" without exactly mentioning a specific date on the end of the mission although later mentioned that the decision must be made by April 2008.

On October 12, 2007, Harper announced an independent committee that to review Canada's role in Afghanistan. The committee was headed by former Liberal Cabinet Minister John Manley and recommendations by the panel will be giving at a later date. Other members of the Committee includes former CBC journalist and anchor Pamela Wallin, the former CEO and president of the Canadian National Railway and Bombardier, Paul Tellier, former Conservative Minister Jake Epp and former chief of staff for Brian Mulroney and ambassador to the United States, Derek Burney. The Prime Minister mentioned four possible options to be examined by the committee, including focusing on the reconstruction effort, withdrawing the troops in 2009, ensuring enough training for the Afghan police and military for a possible withdrawal in 2009 or displace the area of operation to another region outside of Kandahar. The panel later suggested in a 90-page document that an extension to the mission is necessary but with an emphasis on diplomacy, training and reconstruction with the deployment of 1 000 new soldiers specializing in training the Afghan police and army forces.

During the Throne Speech on October 16, 2007, the government made word that they want to extend the mission until 2011 after finishing the training of Afghan military and police officers in which it mentions that it would be impossible to conclude by 2009 although a vote would be proposed on the issue. While the Throne Speech passed, General Rick Hillier mentioned that the mission could take another 10 years at least before training and re-building the Afghan army, thus 6 years further than the new proposed deadline for the end of the mission. A confidence mention is scheduled for Spring 2008.

Meanwhile, Defense Minister Peter MacKay told at a NATO summit in Lithuania in February 2008 that more NATO members should contribute to the Afghan Mission.

=== Flag policy ===
The Harper government, with the support of veterans groups such as the Royal Canadian Legion, re-instituted a policy of lowering the national flag at military installations such as Department of National Defence headquarters only, drawing some criticism that the government was showing a lack of respect for the soldiers. Previously, the flag was lowered at the Peace Tower of Parliament Hill.

=== Harper's speeches on Afghanistan ===
In a televised speech on September 11, 2006, five years after the attacks in New York City and Washington, D.C., Harper linked the events of that day with the current mission in Afghanistan, and encouraged continued support for Canada's military efforts against the Taliban. During another speech this time at the United Nations Assembly in New York on September 21, he asked the organization for help and mentioned that the crisis "is a test of the world body's relevance" and being the UN's most important test and mission for it.

=== Opposition ===
The Canadian public is divided in opinion on regards to the necessity of the mission. A survey in late October 2006 showed that a slight majority of Canadians approved of the mission despite an increase of casualties from Canadian troops over the previous few months. However, the number of casualties increased rapidly in 2006 and 2007, the percentage of Canadians opposed increased significantly. The province with the strongest opposition was Quebec. A June 2007 Journal de Montréal poll conducted after the first Quebec casualties in the mission showed that nearly 70 percent of its population were opposed to the mission, while it was 53 percent in a March poll. The Quebec City area that includes CFB Valcartier, at which are based most of the Quebec troops assigned for the mission, had the strongest support for the mission, but were also in majority opposed.

Among the opposition parties, the New Democratic Party has asked on multiple occasions that the government withdraw the troops, but was the only party that was fully against the project. The Bloc Québécois had previously asked about an emergency debate in the House of the Commons which was refused by the Conservatives. On December 12, 2006, the Bloc's Deputy Leader Michel Gauthier told the media that the party had even considered introducing a confidence motion on the mission that could topple the government. The Liberal Party and its newly elected leader Stéphane Dion mentioned that they would not topple the government on that issue.

In 2007, the Bloc Québécois pressured the government to officially end the mission by 2009 and in September threatened to vote against the Throne Speech if the government did end the mission in that year as the House of Commons voted. Harper replied that the government would not comply with the Bloc's demand (along with four others) and pressured the Liberals on the issue, who are more in favor for the conclusion of the mission in 2009, while the NDP kept their same position as the year before. However, Dion, in the midst of a turmoil inside his party following poor results in the September by-elections in Quebec and stagnant support across the country, said that the Liberals would listen to the Throne Speech before deciding on whether or not they will defeat the government. Harper said that it was up to the opposition to defeat the government and force new elections just under 2 years after the 2006 elections.

The mission received support from the United States and the Bush administration. U.S. Secretary of State Condoleezza Rice, in a meeting with Peter MacKay praised the efforts of the Canadian troops, notably their courage and sacrifice. In addition, NATO had also asked the country to extend its mission beyond 2009.

=== Military spending ===
Harper had promised that he would increase the size of the naval fleet as well as increasing the overall number of soldiers. In the 2006 budget, the Canadian Forces received an additional $5.3 billion over five years.

Defense Minister Gordon O'Connor had later requested additional funding of 15 billion dollars to acquire fleets of helicopters and aircraft, such as the Boeing Chinook helicopter, the Boeing C-17 Globemaster plane, and the Lockheed Martin C-130 Hercules aircraft. He later announced that new Leopard 2 Tanks would be added to the fleet replacing the older Leopard C2 vehicles by the summer of 2007.

Most of the equipment would provide operational support for the soldiers currently serving in Afghanistan. This new equipment would be in addition to new Sikorsky H-92 helicopters requested by the previous government's defense minister Bill Graham. The Royal Canadian Navy has been especially stretched, with the 2013 HMCS Algonquin (DDG 283) incident leaving Canada with no air defense or command and control in the entire Pacific Ocean.

While under the previous Liberal government the time needed to purchase equipment had dropped to only 89 months, under Harper this delay has grown to 199 months. This was partially due to the year after year defense spending cuts.

=== Detainees abuse claims ===
In April and May 2006, when concerns surfaced over the fate of individuals detained in Afghanistan by Canadian soldiers and given into Afghan custody, Defence Minister Gordon O'Connor claimed that the Red Cross or Red Crescent would supervise the handover and treatment of detainees and notify Canada if any problem occurred. This was later denied by the International Committee of the Red Cross, after which O'Connor apologised for misleading the House.

On April 23, 2007, The Globe and Mail reported that 30 Afghan detainees had been tortured after handover to Afghan authorities. The government responded that they will investigate over the matter but mentioned that Canadian soldiers were treating them properly. However, opposition members called for O'Connor's resignation.

== Middle East policies ==
In parallel to realigning Canada's relationship to the United States, which critics of the Liberal governments argued had become tainted by a counter-productive hostility that ignored basic shared democratic principles, the Harper government reexamined policy in the Middle East in general, and regarding Israel in particular. The so-called "Arabists" in the Department of Foreign Affairs lost influence, and many left, including Ambassador Michael Bell. In addition, the concepts of "even-handedness" and "balance" were seen as lacking a core moral foundation and commitment to democracy that had long been central to Canada's foreign policy.

In part, this change was reflected in the effort to restore traditional Canadian support for the reestablishment of the traditional Jewish nation-state of Israel, the only transparent democracy in the Middle East. The Harper governments emphasized their commitment to supporting Israel's right to self-defence.

=== Israeli-Palestinian negotiations ===
The Harper government reversed many positions of the Martin government; Harper re-established traditional Canadian support for Israel as a beleaguered democracy. In United Nations votes related to Israel, the Palestinians, and related issues, which almost always went against Israel, reflecting the large bloc of votes from the Organization of Islamic Cooperation (OIC), Canada generally joined the US, Israel, Australia and a few other countries in principled opposition. PM Harper also announced that Canada would not participate in the Durban Review Conference, and that, in contrast to the antisemitic NGO Forum that took place in the initial conference in 2001, no Canadian taxpayer funds would be spent in support of this event, which was again expected to be exploited by radical groups for anti-Israel campaigning. In a joint statement, ministers Bernier and Kenney noted that the original 2001 Durban conference "degenerated into open and divisive expressions of intolerance and antisemitism that undermined the principles of the United Nations and the very goals the conference sought to achieve." Although they "hoped that the preparatory process for the 2009 Durban Review Conference would remedy the mistakes of the past", the evidence showed that "the process was too flawed to make the conference worthwhile." Similarly, Harper declared that "Canada will not lend its name and reputation to an international conference that promotes ... scapegoating the Jewish people." He added that Canada "will participate in any international conference that combats racism. We will not, however, lend Canada's good name to those, such as Durban II, that promote it." When evidence surfaced that the framework known as Rights and Democracy, which was funded by government budgets, had defied this policy, an investigation was undertaken, and in 2012, the organization was shut down.

Canada was the first to take this principled position and was later joined by the US under President Obama, Australia, Italy, Germany and other democratic governments, thereby enhancing the Harper government's leadership role on these issues.

In December 2008, the Conference of Presidents of Major American Jewish Organizations presented Stephen Harper, and his government with its inaugural International Leadership Award.

On other aspects of the conflict between Palestinians and Israel, the Harper government followed a policy based on realism, in contrast to the idealism of previous governments. In 2006, the Conservatives responded to the successes of the Hamas terror group in 2006 legislative elections by reducing funds. (Hamas is categorized as a terrorist organization by Canadian authorities.) Foreign Minister MacKay did meet with Palestinians in the West Bank but not with any members of Hamas, as Canadian diplomats are not allowed to negotiate with terrorist groups.

In January 2007, on a two-day mission in the Middle East, Foreign Affairs Minister MacKay met Israel Prime Minister Ehud Olmert and with Palestinians. According to media reports, the talks covered a number of issues, including the Israeli security barrier constructed following numerous Palestinian mass terror attacks. MacKay stated that it was justified due to security reasons, and could be removed if peace efforts succeeded.

In 2012, Canada joined the nations (including the US) that opposed the campaign to avoid peace negotiations and promote unilateral recognition of Palestinian statehood at the United Nations.

=== Israel-Lebanon conflict ===
At the outset of the 2006 Israel-Lebanon conflict, which began with the Hezbollah terror group's attack across the international border, Harper defended publicly Israel's "right to defend itself," and described the Israeli response as "measured". Harper stated that Hezbollah and Hamas's release of Israeli prisoners (Hezbollah held the bodies of two dead Israeli soldiers who were killed in the initial attack) would bring an end to the conflict. On July 17, 2006, Harper noted that the situation had deteriorated since his initial comments, but that it was difficult for Israel to fight "non-governmental forces" embedded in the civilian population. Harper reiterated his earlier support for Israel and called on both sides to show restraint and minimize civilian casualties.

The Canadian government made arrangements to evacuate about 30,000 Canadians, mainly of Lebanese descent, from Lebanon after hostilities broke out. The response was criticized as slow and inefficient. Foreign Affairs Minister Peter MacKay had defended the response mentioning that the capacity of the ships were limited.

Foreign Affairs Minister Peter MacKay joined Harper in reiterating support for Israel's position and urging restraint while calling for a ceasefire. Speaking of the situation in both Lebanon and Gaza on July 18, Harper told reporters, "We all want to encourage not just a ceasefire, but a resolution. And a resolution will only be achieved when everyone gets to the table and everyone admits... recognition of each other," referring to the refusal of Hezbollah and Hamas to recognize Israel's right to exist. Harper laid the blame for the civilian deaths on both sides at the feet of Hezbollah. "Hezbollah's objective is violence," Harper asserted, "Hezbollah believes that through violence it can create, it can bring about the destruction of Israel. Violence will not bring about the destruction of Israel... and inevitably the result of the violence will be the deaths primarily of innocent people.".

In August 2006, Peterborough MP Dean Del Mastro announced a visit to Lebanon with the National Council on Canada-Arab Relations, along with members of the Opposition parties. However, shortly before his departure, Del Mastro canceled his trip citing security reasons.

== Other international issues ==
=== Darfur conflict ===
Canada has also participated in the failed peace efforts in the Darfur region of Sudan where a bitter conflict since 2003 has killed nearly a quarter-million people. The Conservative government announced on March 1, 2007, an additional funding of $48 million in order to assist the African Union peacekeeping efforts as well as giving the population affected by the conflict access to urgent needs. Since 2003, more than $190 million were pledged by Canada, as well as shipping humanitarian goods to the Darfur region.

While announcing the funding, MacKay had also expressed concerns in regards to the civil rights violation record of the country and had requested a ceasefire. On September 28, 2006, during a speech at the summit of the Francophonie, Harper called on the United Nations to take a bigger role on the conflict in order to help the "desperate".

=== Policy regarding foreign capital punishment ===
In November 2007, Canada's minority Conservative government reversed a longstanding policy of automatically requesting clemency for Canadian citizens sentenced to capital punishment. The ongoing case of Alberta-born Ronald Allen Smith, who has been on death row in the United States since 1982 after being convicted of murdering two people and who continues to seek calls for clemency from the Canadian government, prompted Canadian Public Safety Minister Stockwell Day to announce the change in policy. Day has stated that each situation should be handled on a case-by-case basis. Smith's case resulted in a sharp divide between the Liberals and the Conservatives, with the Liberals passing a motion declaring that the government "should stand consistently against the death penalty, as a matter of principle, both in Canada and around the world". However, an overwhelming majority of Conservatives supported the change in policy.

In a 2011 interview given to Canadian media, Canadian prime minister Stephen Harper affirmed his private support for capital punishment by saying, "I personally think there are times where capital punishment is appropriate."

=== North Korea ===
In 2006, the Conservative government joined the US and many other countries in condemning the nuclear tests conducted by the North Korean regime of Kim Jong-Il, in blatant defiance of the 1970 Nuclear Non-Proliferation Treaty. Peter MacKay also strongly supported the imposition of sanctions by the United Nations Security Council such as trade restrictions on goods and arms as well as trade embargoes.

Prior to the nuclear test, MacKay also condemned a North Korean missile test in July 2006, and called the country a major threat for the stability of the East Asian region. Harper stated that, "the fact that (North Korea) is prepared to arm itself and prepared to threaten to use such armaments... is something that we should be gravely concerned about"

During the APEC summit, Canada sent a diplomat to focus on the North Korean nuclear threat.

=== AIDS ===
The City of Toronto hosted an international summit on AIDS, a worldwide issue which also affects Canada. Health Minister Tony Clement represented the government; Stephen Harper didn't attend the summit due to issues surrounding the Canadian Arctic region. This drew heavy criticism from organizers. Immediately after the conference, Clement didn't announce any further Canadian funding or measures for fighting the disease, "because it was becoming difficult to have a rational discussion." However, he did add that the country had significantly increased its financial support. On World AIDS Day, December 1, 2006, Canada had announced a 250-million dollar pledge over a two-year period for the fight against AIDS and promised a 10-year 450 million dollar funding to African countries. Stephen Lewis a UN Special Envoy had requested funding of 30 billion dollars by the G8 countries including Canada by 2010

On February 20, 2007, Harper, along with Microsoft chairman Bill Gates, announced a total of $139 million in new funding for the Canadian HIV Vaccine Initiative. The federal government will contribute $111 million while the Bill & Melinda Gates Foundation will commit an additional $28 million.

=== Relations with China ===
As the economic level of the People's Republic of China progressed rapidly during the 1990s, the Canadian government concluded several economic and partnership deals with the country. However, when the Conservative government took power in 2006, relations between the two had changed most notably due on the question of human rights in the People's Republic of China in which the Conservative government had criticized its records. Meanwhile, President Hu Jintao criticized Canada for making the Dalai Lama an honorary citizen and to make several meetings with him. The monk made his latest visit in October 2007 where he met with Harper, the first time a Canadian prime minister met with the spiritual leader. Secretary of State and MP Jason Kenney denied that the meeting will cause harm to trade relations between the two countries despite threats from the Chinese governments due to the meeting in which the Chinese Foreign Ministry called it "gross interference in China's affairs". In addition, Hu also criticized the government about its accusations over China's human rights record and denied any kind of abuse of it in his country.

Before the APEC summit in November 2006, the issue of human rights was a hot topic on Harper's agenda. He discussed the issue in Vietnam with Prime Minister Nguyen Tan Dung where there have been also criticism on the country's respect of rights. At the APEC summit in Hanoi, Vietnam, Harper met with Hu, after tensions between the two countries nearly called off a scheduled meeting between the two leaders. There were no official reports of discussions on the issue of human rights, but Harper had urged that the relations between the two countries needs to be built.

In January 2007, while on a business trip to the People's Republic of China, Finance Minister Jim Flaherty, had vowed to improve relations between the two countries and also promised to discuss firmly the issue of human rights. Trade Minister David Emerson also announced a "China strategy" in which there will be funding (which will be announced in the 2007 budget) for developing this strategy.

Following a period of violence and unrest in Tibet in March 2008, the Prime Minister as well as MP Pierre Poilievre has called again the country respect human rights and show "restraint" in the Tibet uprising. The government did not discuss the possibility of a Canadian boycott of the Beijing 2008 Summer Olympics. Harper cited that it would be premature to discuss that possibility and added that Canada would send high-ranking representatives to opening ceremonies while monitoring the situation in China before the Games.

In 2008, former prime minister Jean Chrétien had criticized Harper for missing opening ceremonies for the 2008 Beijing Olympics; in response, Dmitri Soudas, a spokesperson for Mr. Harper, called the remarks hypocritical, pointing out that Chrétien "attended one of six Olympic opening ceremonies during his 13 years as prime minister.

In 2009, Harper visited China. During the visit Chinese premier Wen Jiabao publicly scolded Harper for not visiting earlier, pointing out that "this is the first meeting between the Chinese premier and a Canadian prime minister in almost five years"; Harper in response said that, "it's almost been five years since we had yourself or President Hu in our country."

=== Kosovo independence ===
On March 18, 2008, Canadian Foreign Affairs Minister Maxime Bernier issued a statement that recognized the Independence of Kosovo, which became a separated country from Serbia in February 2008. The Serbian ambassador filled a protest against Canada's decision to recognize the newly sovereign nation. The Serbian ambassador to Canada, Dusan Batakovic, cited that it might renew the independence movement in Quebec. Harper rejected the Kosovo and Quebec comparison, and replied that the Kosovo situation was unique because "The situation that evolved there was a situation of war (and) terrible suffering by the Kosovars." Harper also noted that Kosovo's independence had already been widely recognized by at least 30 countries, including most members of NATO alliance.

=== Bid for seat on the UN security council ===
On October 12, 2010, a vote was held for temporary seats on the UN Security Council for a two-year term beginning on 1 January 2011. Canada contested for one of two seats against Portugal and Germany. Germany won a seat in the first round. Canada's vote declined significantly in the second round and it withdrew from contention giving the seat to Portugal. It was the first time in the history of the UN that Canada has sought a seat and lost. The opposition Liberal and New Democratic parties blamed Harper's foreign policy, particularly as it relates to the environment, for the loss.

=== Office of Religious Freedom ===
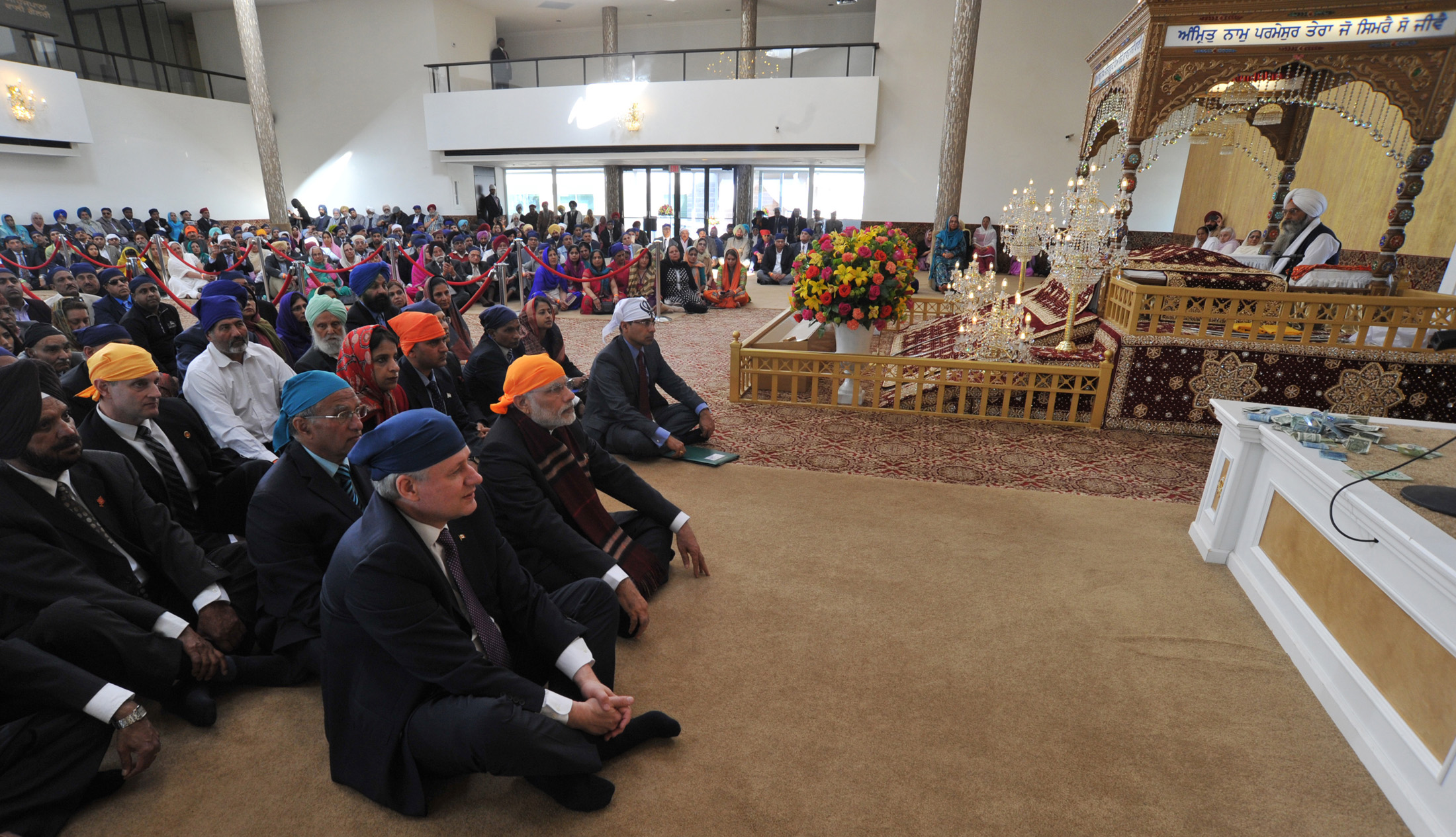
Harper at Gurudwara Khalsa Diwan in Vancouver with Narendra Modi in 2015

The establishment of the Office of Religious Freedom to protect freedom of religion internationally was announced during Harper's 2011 election campaign. On February 19, 2013, the office was officially opened and Harper announced that academic Andrew P.W. Bennett would be its first ambassador.

=== 2014 Ukraine-Crimea crisis ===
The crisis brought on by the fall of Viktor Yanukovich, President of Ukraine until 22 February 2014, saw the annexation of Crimea by the Russian Federation become a significant factor in Canadian politics. For example, the House of Commons voted unanimously on a 3 March motion by Ted Opitz, with cross-party support provided by Peggy Nash and Ralph Goodale, to censure Russia as follows:

That this House strongly condemn Russia's provocative military intervention in Ukraine; call upon Russia to withdraw its forces and respect the territorial integrity and sovereignty of Ukraine, as per the commitments in the 1994 Budapest Declaration and under international law; reaffirm the legitimacy of the Government of Ukraine and Ukraine's territorial integrity; support the Government's decision to recall Canada's ambassador in Moscow for consultations and to suspend the Government's engagement in preparation for the G-8 Summit; encourage the Government to work with like-minded partners, including through multilateral forums, to de-escalate the current situation; affirm the Ukrainian people's right of self-determination, free from intervention; and stand with the Ukrainian people as they pursue a free and democratic future.

Harper also announced he would restart free-trade talks with Ukraine, a show of support for the country's new leadership. Ukrainian-Canadians make up roughly 3.3% of the population of Canada.

Russia was quick to respond through Parliamentary channels as there could no longer be discussion through diplomats, and on 24 March, Alexander Romanovich, deputy chairman of the foreign affairs committee in the Duma, stated that "We will never give up Crimea. Crimea is Russia." Romanovich, who saw the influence of the Ukrainian-Canadian community, said Canadian actions in response to the Crimea crisis were unnecessarily provocative, and that Russia would match each round of sanctions with new measures of its own, as they had just sanctioned 13 Canadian Parliamentarians, government officials and the head of the Ukrainian-Canadian Congress the previous day. "Our relations with Canada are not just unconstructive, they're poor. Canada stopped military relations with Russia, and so one or two people who were over there teaching got sent home. It's ridiculous. These sanctions are a way of waging war without weapons. To use sanctions is to be belligerent."

Harper's visit to Europe the week of 23 March cemented his reputation as the leading hawk among G7 nations and the most zealous ally of a new Ukraine government considered wholly illegitimate by Putin. In Berlin on 27 March Harper said that "Notwithstanding all of our efforts to make Mr. Putin a partner, he has not desired to be a partner. He has desired to be a rival."

Harper said he believes that Russians, and in particular the younger generation of Russians, share the values of the West and want to be partners. He said the view of most Western powers is that they will some day have "common interests and the projection of common values on the international scene."

On 20 March, the Ukrainian government called for all guns to be turned in. French ambassador Alain Remy said that this was a central requirement for the European Union to begin disbursing financial aid. Ukrainian prime minister pro-tem Arseniy Yatseniuk suggested that gun owners might join the National Guard. Dmitri Yarosh, the Right Sector leader said that "It's not normal to ask people to hand in their weapons in the situation we have now." Canadians have had their own debate over the federal gun registry, which had been cancelled by the Harper government a few years earlier. High Representative of the Union for Foreign Affairs and Security Policy Catherine Ashton stressed the need to "hand over any unauthorised arms to the authorities immediately," in the wake of a protest on 26 March at the parliament building, to pressure lawmakers to sack the newly appointed Interior Minister Arsen Avakov because the Right Sector group believes that Avakov is personally responsible for ordering what they call a political assassination of one of their leader, Aleksandr Muzychko, who was killed in a special operation in a city of Rivne the previous evening.

On 28 April, the Harper government announced further economic sanctions on nine additional Russians and two Russian banks amid escalating tensions over Ukraine. Travel bans are also being imposed on the nine individuals. This was done in concert with the US, which imposed escalating sanctions of its own, including export licence applications for any high-technology items that could contribute to Russian military capabilities. The US Commerce and State Departments revoked any existing export licences that meet these conditions. Tit-for-tat economic sanctions had begun in March 2014.

On 30 April, a frigate was sent to the Baltic sea, in support of NATO allies there. The combined involvement on this day of the Canadian Armed Forces stood at the frigate HMCS Regina, and in Romania six CF-18 fighter jets, one C-17 heavy lift plane, one Airbus troop transporter, one Airbus airborne refueler, and an estimated 250 military personnel, as well as three military personnel on the ground in Ukraine as part of the ill-fated OSCE mission, while the German press reported the next Sunday that CIA and FBI personnel were in Kyiv to advise the Ukrainians on their security structure. RCAF Lieutenant-General Yvan Blondin was in charge of the mission.

An expert in conflict studies at the University of Ottawa, Professor Philippe Lagasse, remarked that the opposition parties in Parliament had been silent on the gradual deployment to the area of military forces, and was perplexed at the lack of a take-note debate: "I'm a little baffled by the fact that this is occurring and the opposition seems to have no real inclination to debate the issue."

On 4 May, the Harper government extended the sanctions regime to 16 more Russian "entities", while the same weekend saw more than 50 people killed in Odesa and Donetsk. Odesa is approximately 100 km from the frontier with Romania, site of the Royal Canadian Air Force mission. Sergei Lavrov warned of "fratricidal conflict", while Putin was "extremely concerned" about phone calls asking for help.

On 19 June, Defence Minister Rob Nicholson stated, in reply to a Parliamentary question, that, over the previous two weeks, Canadian fighter jets had been scrambled twice to ward off Russian bombers. A Russian spokesman in Ottawa, Andrey Grebenshchikov bemoaned the state of communications between the two nations, which occurred when the Harper government unilaterally ceased all contact between them. This occurred in light of the revelations of a similar incident over California.

== See also ==
- Stephen Harper
- Premiership of Stephen Harper
- Harper Ministry
- Domestic policy of the Stephen Harper government
