= List of schools in Ottawa =

List of schools in Ottawa, Ontario, Canada.

== Colleges and universities ==
=== Public colleges and universities ===
- Algonquin College
- Carleton University
- La Cité collégiale
- University of Ottawa
  - Saint Paul University

=== Private ===
- Augustine College (unaccredited)

== Elementary and secondary public schools in Ottawa ==
=== Public school boards ===
==== English ====
- List of schools of the Ottawa-Carleton District School Board

==== French ====
- List of schools of the Conseil des écoles publiques de l'Est de l'Ontario

=== Catholic school boards ===
==== English ====
- List of schools of the Ottawa Catholic School Board

==== French ====
- List of schools of the Conseil des écoles catholiques de langue française du Centre-Est

== Elementary and secondary private schools in Ottawa ==
=== English ===
- Académie de la Capitale (Acadecap International School) (secondary)
- Adult High School
- Ashbury College
- Astolot Educational Centre
- Blyth Academy
- Edelweiss Private Academy
- The Element High School
- Elmwood School
- Fern Hill School
- Glebe Montessori School
- Heritage Academy
- Kanata Academy
- Kanata Montessori School
- Manotick Montessori School
- March Academy
- MindWare Academy
- Revel Academy
- Turnbull School
- VINCI School
- Polaris School and Centre

=== Bilingual ===
- Académie de la Capitale (Acadecap International School) (middle school)
- Académie St-Laurent Academy
- Académie Joan of Arc Academy
- Macdonald-Cartier Academy
- OMS Montessori
- Westboro Academy

=== French ===
- Académie de la Capitale (elementary)
- Lycée Claudel d'Ottawa (JK–12)

=== Jewish ===
- Ottawa Jewish Community School (K–8)
- Yeshiva High School of Ottawa (9–12)
- Torah Day School of Ottawa (K–8)
- Westboro Jewish Montessori (PK–K)

=== Christian ===
- Académie Providence (JK–8)
- Ambassadors Christian School (SK–8)
- Bishop Hamilton Montessori School (JK–8)
- Community Christian School (K–8)
- Maryvale Academy (K–8)
- Ottawa Christian School (JK–8)
- Ottawa Victory Christian Academy (JK–12)
- Redeemer Christian High School (9–12)
- St. Timothy's Classical Academy (SK–8)

=== Islamic ===
- Abraar School (JK–8)
- Ottawa Islamic School (JK–12)
- Ahlul-Bayt Islamic School (JK–10)
- Ecole Ibn Batouta (JK–12)

== Sources ==
- Cummings / MacSkimming, H. R. / W. T. (1971), The City of Ottawa public schools, a brief history., Ottawa, Ontario: Ottawa Board of Education
- Jamieson, M. (1910), Schools and schoolmasters of Bytown and early Ottawa. Vol. III., Ottawa, Ontario: Transactions of the Women’s Canadian Historical Society of Ottawa
