= Office of Religious Freedom =

Office of the Foreign Affairs Department of the Canadian government

Agency overview
- Formed: 19 February 2013
- Dissolved: 31 March 2016
- Employees: 5
- Annual budget: C$5,000,000
- Agency executive: Andrew P. W. Bennett, Ambassador for Religious Freedom
- Parent department: Global Affairs Canada

The Office of Religious Freedom was an agency of Global Affairs Canada that was established by the Government of Canada on 19 February 2013 to monitor religious persecution and protect freedom of religion internationally. It closed on 31 March 2016. In 2021, the Deputy Leader of Conservative Party of Canada Candice Bergen called for the re-establishment of Office of Religious Freedom in Canada to help address issues like the forced conversion of minority girls in Pakistan.

== History ==
Canadian Prime Minister Stephen Harper announced the Office of Religious Freedom as part of his political campaign during the 2011 federal election. A closed-door meeting about the office was criticized when it was discovered that of the six panellists consulted, four were Christian, one Jewish, and one Baháʼí. Harper denied the office would have a Christian bias. In response to claims of such a bias at the similar Office of International Religious Freedom in the United States, Harper stated that Canada is "a very different country".

The Office of Religious Freedom was officially opened on 19 February 2013 and Harper announced that Andrew P. W. Bennett, dean of Augustine College and a former civil servant, would be its first Ambassador for Religious Freedom.

On 31 March 2016 the Office of Religious Freedom was closed by the newly elected government of Prime Minister Justin Trudeau.

== Mandate ==
The office's stated mandate was to:

1. protect, and advocate on behalf of, religious minorities under threat;
2. oppose religious hatred and intolerance; and
3. promote Canadian values of pluralism and tolerance abroad.

== Criticism ==
The Office of Religious Freedom faced some criticism during its proposal and existence. Humanist Canada and the Centre for Inquiry Canada (CFIC) noted that no secular organizations were consulted about the creation of the office, nor were they invited to the official announcement of the new ambassador. Bob Rae, the then-interim Liberal leader, agreed that religious freedom is an important value but questioned how the office would fit into Canada's broader efforts to address human rights issues. A representative of the Canadian Council on American-Islamic Relations raised concerns as to whether the office was too Christian focused, since the person appointed to lead it was a Catholic.

== Endorsement ==
Former British prime minister Tony Blair, a Roman Catholic, warmly endorsed the Office while in Ottawa in October 2013, "I think the very fact that Canada's taken the step to have an Office of Religious Freedom is a great sign. I think it shows leadership from Canada. And Canada, by the way, in many ways is a perfect place from which to promote this ideal because of the complexion of the country."

== Effects ==
Harper stated that Chinese diplomats were upset that he had "singled out religious persecution in China" during his announcement of the establishment of the office.

In a 2013 Globe and Mail article by Steven Chase, Ambassador Bennett was quoted saying, "Freedom of religion includes the freedom not to have a particular religious faith ... I think that’s just logically consistent." The author continued, "[Ambassador Bennett] signalled his greatest priority would be believers. .. The vast majority of people being persecuted are people of faith. They are the ones that are being killed. They are the ones that are facing legislative and regulatory restrictions."

== See also ==
- Foreign policy of the Stephen Harper government
- Freedom of religion in Canada
