= Augustine College =

Private Christian liberal arts college in Ottawa, Ontario, Canada

- Motto: Credo ut intelligam
- Motto in English: "I believe so that I may understand"
- Type: Private
- Established: 1997
- Religious affiliation: Non-denominational Christian
- President: John Patrick
- Faculty: 10
- Administrative staff: 10
- Students: 10 to 22
- Location: 152 Metcalfe Street; Ottawa, Ontario; K2P 1N9; 45.4011°N 75.6884°W
- Campus: Urban
- Website: augustinecollege.org

Augustine College (AC) is a private ecumenical Christian liberal arts college in Ottawa, Ontario. Augustine currently offers two semester-long programs focused on the histories of science and the humanities in late and classical antiquity and in the modern era, respectively. AC operates on an unincorporated basis and without program accreditation, but maintains transfer credit agreements with several other postsecondary institutions in North America.

== History ==
AC was founded in 1997 in Ottawa by a group of university professors "disgruntled" by the fact that traditionally Christian ideals of education were "strangely missing from the curriculum of colleges and universities." The group included John Patrick, then Associate Professor in Clinical Nutrition in the Department of Biochemistry and Pediatrics at the University of Ottawa (now retired), who currently serves as AC's President. Other local university faculty at one time associated with AC have included Edmund Bloedow (University of Ottawa) and David Stewart (Trent University) (both deceased), as well as Dominic Manganiello (University of Ottawa) and David Lyle Jeffrey (Baylor University), who co-edited the volume Rethinking the Future of the University shortly following AC's inauguration. AC drew media attention when its academic dean, Andrew Bennett, was appointed Canada's Ambassador of Religious Freedom in 2013.

== Academics ==
AC's promotional material frames the school's vision "to grow in wisdom and in virtue by exploring the riches of Western culture" as a response to perceived deconstructionist trends in mainstream academia, which "is often marked by suspicious attitudes and deconstructive approaches to the content of Western tradition." President John Patrick has elsewhere criticized contemporary universities for fostering what he sees as an increasingly "toxic environment" for religious students. Though AC does not "condemn critical engagement with ideas" as such, its programs are intended to present "the legacy of Western culture as something to be learned from, not only about."

According to its website, AC currently offers two separate, consecutive programs of study. The first of these runs from September to December and is focused on the "Ancient World." Students take courses on the histories of philosophy, science, literature, art, and Christianity, spanning the period from antiquity to the Middle Ages. The second program, running from January to April, is focused on the "Modern World." The historical focus of the courses remains the same and traces their subject matter from the period of the Renaissance down to the present day.

AC does not operate under a provincial or territorial charter and is not listed as a member of Universities Canada. As such, its programs do not lead to the conferral of a degree and most North American universities do not count AC courses toward the requirements of an undergraduate degree. AC does, however, have individual credit transfer agreements in place with several universities in North America. These include Redeemer University, Saint Paul University, and Trinity Western University.

== Weston Lecture ==
AC hosts an annual public lecture in Ottawa by a well-known Christian intellectual. The lecture series is funded by the Weston Family Foundation. Past Weston Lecture speakers have included Peter Kreeft, Michał Heller, John Behr, and R. R. Reno.

== See also ==
- List of schools in Ottawa
