= 2012 Challenger of Dallas – Singles =

Singles
- 2012 Challenger of Dallas

Final
- Champion: (United States) Jesse Levine
- Runner-up: (Belgium) Steve Darcis
- Score: 6–4, 6–4

Events
Singles	Doubles
- Challenger of Dallas

Alex Bogomolov Jr. was the defending champion but decided not to participate.

Jesse Levine won the title, defeating Steve Darcis in the final, 6–4, 6–4.

== Seeds ==
1. (United States) Ryan Sweeting (first round)
2. (Belgium) Steve Darcis (final)
3. (United States) Sam Querrey (first round)
4. (Germany) Tobias Kamke (first round)
5. (United States) Wayne Odesnik (second round)
6. (South Africa) Izak van der Merwe (semifinals)
7. (United States) Rajeev Ram (first round)
8. (Lithuania) Ričardas Berankis (quarterfinals)

== Draw ==
Key

- Q = Qualifier
- WC = Wild card
- LL = Lucky loser
- Alt = Alternate
- ITF = ITF entry
- PR = Protected ranking
- SR = Special ranking
- SE = Special exempt
- JE = Junior exempt
- JR = Junior Accelerator Programme entrant
- CO = College Accelerator Programme entrant
- NG = Next Gen Accelerator Program entrant
- w/o = Walkover
- r = Retired
- d = Defaulted

=== Finals ===
Semifinals
(United States) Jesse Levine	6	7
(Germany) Stefan Seifert	4	5
6	(South Africa) Izak van der Merwe	6^{4}	3
2	(Belgium) Steve Darcis	7^{7}	6

Final
(United States) Jesse Levine	6	6
2	(Belgium) Steve Darcis	4	4

=== Top half ===
First round
1	(United States) R Sweeting	3	4
Q	(Australia) C Ball	6	6
WC	(United States) R Williams	6^{5}	7	0
(United States) R Ginepri	7^{7}	6^{5}	6
(United States) J Levine	5
(Colombia) E Struvay	0^{r}
WC	(United States) B Baker	5	3
5	(United States) W Odesnik	7	6
4	(Germany) T Kamke	6^{3}	6	4
(India) Y Bhambri	7^{7}	4	6
(United States) M Yani	6	1	2
(Germany) Stefan Seifert	4	6	6
(Canada) P-L Duclos	6^{4}	6	5
(United States) D Kudla	7^{7}	3	7
(Germany) M Zverev	6	7^{7}
7	(United States) R Ram	4	6^{5}

Second round
Q	(Australia) C Ball	7^{7}	7^{7}
(United States) R Ginepri	6^{5}	6^{3}
(United States) J Levine	6	6
5	(United States) W Odesnik	4	1
(India) Y Bhambri	4	2
(Germany) S Seifert	6	6
(United States) D Kudla	6	5	6
(Germany) M Zverev	3	7	2

Quarterfinals
Q	(Australia) C Ball	2	6	3
(United States) J Levine	6	3	6
(Germany) S Seifert	6	6
(United States) D Kudla	4	2

Semifinals
(United States) J Levine	6	7
(Germany) S Seifert	4	5

=== Bottom half ===
First round
6	(South Africa) I van der Merwe	6	7^{9}
Q	(Serbia) V Obradović	2	6^{7}
WC	(United States) J Sock	2	7^{7}	6
(United States) R Kendrick	6	6^{1}	3
Q	(France) Clément Reix	6	0	6
(France) J Eysseric	4	6	1
(United States) A Kuznetsov	7^{7}	6
3/WC	(United States) S Querrey	6^{4}	3
8	(Lithuania) R Berankis	6	6
Q	(United Kingdom) C Eaton	4	2
(Germany) A Begemann	6^{2}	6	6
(Colombia) C Salamanca	7^{7}	2	3
(United Kingdom) A Bogdanovic	6	6
(United States) T Smyczek	3	2
(South Africa) F Wolmarans	4	4
2	(Belgium) S Darcis	6	6

Second round
6	(South Africa) I van der Merwe	6	4	3
WC	(United States) J Sock	1	6	0^{r}
Q	(France) C Reix	2	7	7^{7}
(United States) A Kuznetsov	6	5	6^{3}
8	(Lithuania) R Berankis	6	6
(Germany) A Begemann	4	4
(United Kingdom) A Bogdanovic	2	5
2	(Belgium) S Darcis	6	7

Quarterfinals
6	(South Africa) I van der Merwe	6	6
Q	(France) C Reix	4	3
8	(Lithuania) R Berankis	4	6	3
2	(Belgium) S Darcis	6	2	6

Semifinals
6	(South Africa) I van der Merwe	6^{4}	3
2	(Belgium) S Darcis	7^{7}	6
