= Ottawa Jewish Community School =

Coordinates: 45°22′33.3″N 75°45′06.6″W

Location
- 21 Nadolny Sachs Private; Ottawa, Ontario, K2A 1R9; Canada

Information
- Type: Independent Jewish day school
- Religious affiliation: Jewish
- Established: 1949; 77 years ago
- Head of school: Jon Mitzmacher
- Grades: K–8
- Enrollment: approx. 200
- Language: Hebrew, English and French
- Colours: Blue and white
- Website: theojcs.ca

The Ottawa Jewish Community School (or OJCS) is a pluralistic Jewish day school in Ottawa, Ontario. The school was founded as Hillel Academy in 1949, and amalgamated with Yitzhak Rabin High School in 2006. OJCS teaches Hebrew, English and French as part of its curriculum, and runs a Judaics program focusing on Jewish religion, culture and values.

== History ==
Hillel Academy founded in 1949 as a community Hebrew day school, offering study from junior kindergarten to grade eight. With the growth and westward shift of the Jewish community, a Jewish community campus was developed in the city's west end in 1983. The 7.8-acre site housed the Hillel Academy, Talmud Torah Afternoon School, Ottawa Modern Jewish School, and Akiva Evening High School.

Yitzhak Rabin High School, also known as Midreshet Ner Yitzhak, was founded in 1995 as a community high school. Hillel Academy and Yitzhak Rabin High School merged in 2006, facing declining enrolment and financial viability.

In 2013 the board of the OJCS and the Jewish Federation of Ottawa set out on a $3 million, five-year campaign to return the school to financial sustainability. The core element of the plan was to introduce a new tuition model that provides stability and allows the OJCS to operate with OJCS revenue being equal to the cost of running the school. A strong emphasis has been put on recruitment and retention efforts. In 2014–15, only seven of the 51 students who graduated from elementary school went on to high school there. In 2015, there were just 24 high school students at OJCS and only 20 were projected for the 2015–16 school year. Of the estimated 900 high school-aged Jewish students in Ottawa, only about two per cent of Jewish families in the city are choosing OJCS for their children. From 1995-June 2015, 149 students have graduated from the community high school. In addition, there are numerous students who attended the community high school at some point in their secondary school years. On February 10, 2015, it was announced by the board of directors of the school that the high school program was no longer financially viable and would be phased out by 2017.

== Extracurricular activities ==
Throughout the year OJCS elementary school students are able to take part in varied clubs and activities including: Spelling Bee, Science Fair, Public Speaking, Spirit Week, Sudoku, Lego Club, Chess, Dance, Mad Science, Environmental Club, Floor Hockey, Origami, Yoga and Mega Sports, overnight trips at the MacSkimming Leadership Centre and, trips to Parliament Hill.

== Notable alumni ==
- Jesse Levine (born 1987), US/Canadian tennis player

== See also ==
- List of schools in Ottawa
