= 2009 U.S. Men's Clay Court Championships – Doubles =

Doubles
- 2009 U.S. Men's Clay Court Championships

Final
- Champions: (United States) Bob Bryan (United States) Mike Bryan
- Runners-up: (United States) Jesse Levine (United States) Ryan Sweeting
- Score: 6–1, 6–2

Details
- Draw: 16
- Seeds: 4

Events
Singles	Doubles
- U.S. Men's Clay Court Championships

Ernests Gulbis and Rainer Schüttler were the defending champions, but chose not to participate that year.

== Seeds ==
1. (United States) Bob Bryan / (United States) Mike Bryan (champions)
2. (Australia) Ashley Fisher / (Australia) Jordan Kerr (semifinals)
3. (Argentina) Lucas Arnold Ker / (Czech Republic) Martin Damm (first round)
4. (Australia) Stephen Huss / (United Kingdom) Ross Hutchins (first round)

== Draw ==
Key

- Q = Qualifier
- WC = Wild card
- LL = Lucky loser
- Alt = Alternate
- ITF = ITF entry
- PR = Protected ranking
- SR = Special ranking
- SE = Special exempt
- JE = Junior exempt
- JR = Junior Accelerator Programme entrant
- CO = College Accelerator Programme entrant
- NG = Next Gen Accelerator Program entrant
- w/o = Walkover
- r = Retired
- d = Defaulted

=== Finals ===
First round
1	(United States) B Bryan (United States) M Bryan	7	6
(France) J Chardy (Argentina) B Dabul	6^{5}	3
(United States) J Isner (United States) T Parrott	6	6
(United States) D Martin (United States) S Querrey	2	3
4	(Australia) S Huss (United Kingdom) R Hutchins	5	6^{6}
(United States) J Cerretani (Belgium) D Norman	7	7
WC	(United States) A Delic (United States) R Kendrick	6	4	[7]
(United States) J Blake (United States) M Fish	4	6	[10]
(Czech Republic) J Levinský (Czech Republic) P Vízner	6	6
(Argentina) M González (Argentina) S Roitman	1	4
WC	(United States) J Levine (United States) R Sweeting	6	6
3	(Argentina) L Arnold Ker (Czech Republic) M Damm	2	4
(Spain) D Gimeno-Traver (Argentina) D Junqueira	3	4
(United States) S Lipsky (Serbia) D Vemić	6	6
(Austria) J Melzer (Austria) A Peya	6	4	[7]
2	(Australia) A Fisher (Australia) J Kerr	3	6	[10]

Quarterfinals
1	(United States) B Bryan (United States) M Bryan	6	6
(United States) J Isner (United States) T Parrott	4	2
(United States) J Cerretani (Belgium) D Norman	3	6^{0}
(United States) J Blake (United States) M Fish	6	7
(Czech Republic) J Levinský (Czech Republic) P Vízner	6^{6}	4
WC	(United States) J Levine (United States) R Sweeting	7	6
(United States) S Lipsky (Serbia) D Vemić	2	4
2	(Australia) A Fisher (Australia) J Kerr	6	6

Semifinals
1	(United States) B Bryan (United States) M Bryan	7	6^{5}	[10]
(United States) J Blake (United States) M Fish	5	7	[4]
WC	(United States) J Levine (United States) R Sweeting	3	6	[10]
2	(Australia) A Fisher (Australia) J Kerr	6	3	[4]

Final
1	(United States) B Bryan (United States) M Bryan	6	6
WC	(United States) J Levine (United States) R Sweeting	1	2
