= Evert Tennis Academy =

Tennis center in Boca Raton, Florida

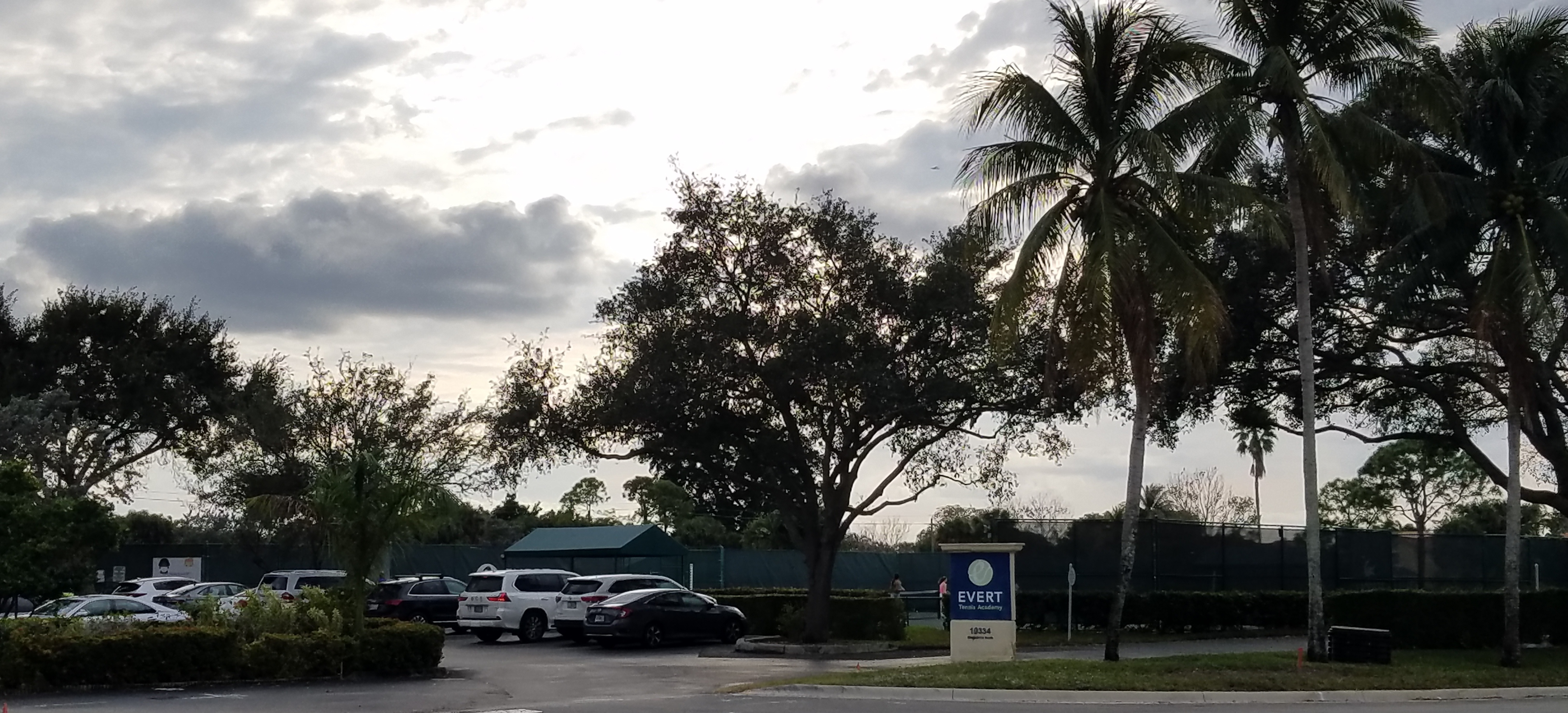

Location
- 10334 Diego Dr S Boca Raton, Florida 33428; United States
- Coordinates: 26.36477°N 80.20988°W

Information
- Established: 1996
- Website: www.evertacademy.com

Evert Tennis Academy is a tennis training center for developing collegiate and professional tennis players in Boca Raton, Florida. The academy was founded by professional tennis player Chris Evert and her brother John Evert. It opened in 1996.

The center offers part-time training options and academic and housing options for students who are enrolled full-time. Full-time students have the option to take online school or go to Boca Prep International School, which is located across the street from the academy.

== History ==
Evert Tennis Academy started a collaboration with Tennis World USA. The partnership began in February 2015. During March of 2015, Evert Tennis Academy students competed in nine United States Tennis Association Florida Level 6 tournament finals.

Boca West Country Club renewed their partnership with Evert Tennis Academy in late 2019.

In February 2020, Evert Tennis Academy partnered with Grandview Preparatory School to provide high school students and full-time training athletes with a custom education program with personalized teaching methods.

== People ==
=== Coaches ===
- John Evert
- Chris Evert
- Alton Borges
- Reginaldo Moralejo
- Ernesto Eichelbaum
- Francesco Michelotti
- Adrian Arroyave
- Joel "JoJo" Nicholson
- Lorenzo Beltrame
- Jacob Hernandez
- Mo Hookaylo
- Juan Camilo Ramirez
- Diego Aviles
- Alexandro Martinez
- Dubravko Petrovich
- Carlos Claverie
- Sofiko Kadzhaya
- Uriel Oquendo
- Nicolás Osorio

=== Alumni ===
- Lauren Davis
- Sébastien Grosjean
- Madison Keys
- Jesse Levine
- Anastasia Pivovarova
- Andy Roddick
- Peng Shuai
- Ajla Tomljanović

== See also ==
- Delray Beach Tennis Center
