= 2010 Fifth Third Bank Tennis Championships =

- Date: July 19 – July 24
- Edition: 16th
- Location: Lexington, Kentucky, United States

Champions

Singles
- (Australia) Carsten Ball

Doubles
- (South Africa) Raven Klaasen / (South Africa) Izak van der Merwe
- Fifth Third Bank Tennis Championships

The 2010 Fifth Third Bank Tennis Championships was a professional men's tennis tournament played on hard court. It was a sixteenth edition of the tournament which was part of the 2010 ATP Challenger Tour. It took place in Lexington, Kentucky, United States, between 19 July and 24 July 2010.

== Singles main-draw entrants ==
=== Seeds ===
Nationality	Player	Ranking*	Seeding
AUS	Carsten Ball	129	1
LTU	Ričardas Berankis	132	2
BRA	João Souza	139	3
USA	Kevin Kim	152	4
USA	Jesse Levine	158	5
CHI	Paul Capdeville	191	6
CAN	Peter Polansky	195	7
AUS	Greg Jones	198	8

- Rankings are as of July 12, 2010.

=== Other entrants ===
The following players received wildcards into the singles main draw:

- (United States) Sekou Bangoura
- (United States) Jarmere Jenkins
- (United States) Denis Kudla
- (United States) Eric Quigley

The following players received entry from the qualifying draw:

- (Canada) Pierre-Ludovic Duclos
- (China) Gong Maoxin
- (Australia) Brydan Klein
- (South Africa) Fritz Wolmarans

== Champions ==
=== Singles ===
(Australia) Carsten Ball defeated (United States) Jesse Levine, 6–4, 7–6^{(7–1)}

=== Doubles ===
(South Africa) Raven Klaasen / (South Africa) Izak van der Merwe defeated (Australia) Kaden Hensel / (Australia) Adam Hubble, 5–7, 6–4, [10–7]
