= 2012 Challenger of Dallas =

Tennis tournament

- Date: 6–12 February
- Edition: 14th
- Location: Dallas, United States

Champions

Singles
- (United States) Jesse Levine

Doubles
- (United Kingdom) Chris Eaton / (United Kingdom) Dominic Inglot
- Challenger of Dallas

The 2012 Challenger of Dallas was a professional tennis tournament played on hard courts. It was the 14th edition of the tournament which was part of the 2012 ATP Challenger Tour. It took place in Dallas, United States between 6 and 12 February 2012.

== Singles main-draw entrants ==
=== Seeds ===
Country	Player	Rank^{1}	Seed
USA	Ryan Sweeting	76	1
BEL	Steve Darcis	84	2
USA	Sam Querrey	89	3
GER	Tobias Kamke	91	4
USA	Wayne Odesnik	112	5
RSA	Izak van der Merwe	118	6
USA	Rajeev Ram	151	7
LTU	Ričardas Berankis	154	8

- ^{1} Rankings are as of January 30, 2012.

=== Other entrants ===
The following players received wildcards into the singles main draw:

- (United States) Brian Baker
- (United States) Jack Sock
- (United States) Sam Querrey
- (United States) Rhyne Williams

The following players received entry from the qualifying draw:

- (Australia) Carsten Ball
- (United Kingdom) Chris Eaton
- (Serbia) Vladimir Obradović
- (France) Clément Reix

== Champions ==
=== Singles ===
(United States) Jesse Levine def. (Belgium) Steve Darcis, 6–4, 6–4

=== Doubles ===
(United Kingdom) Chris Eaton / (United Kingdom) Dominic Inglot def. (United States) Nicholas Monroe / (United States) Jack Sock, 6–7^{(6–8)}, 6–4, [19–17]
