= 2009 U.S. Men's Clay Court Championships =

- Date: April 6–12
- Edition: 41st
- Category: World Tour 250
- Draw: 32S / 16D
- Prize money: $442,500
- Surface: Clay / outdoor
- Location: Houston, TX, United States
- Venue: River Oaks Country Club

Champions

Singles
- (Australia) Lleyton Hewitt

Doubles
- (United States) Bob Bryan / (United States) Mike Bryan
← 2008 ·	U.S. Men's Clay Court Championships	· 2010 →

The 2009 U.S. Men's Clay Court Championships is a men's tennis tournament played on outdoor clay courts. It is the 41st edition of the U.S. Men's Clay Court Championships, and is an ATP World Tour 250 event. It takes place at River Oaks Country Club in Houston, Texas, United States, from April 6 through April 12, 2009. Unseeded Lleyton Hewitt won the singles title.

== Finals ==
=== Singles ===
(Australia) Lleyton Hewitt defeated (United States) Wayne Odesnik 6–2, 7–5

- It was Hewitt's 1st singles title of the year (after a break of 2 years) and the 27th of his career.

=== Doubles ===
(United States) Bob Bryan / (United States) Mike Bryan defeated (United States) Jesse Levine / (United States) Ryan Sweeting 6–1, 6–2
