= 2010 Fifth Third Bank Tennis Championships – Singles =

Singles
- 2010 Fifth Third Bank Tennis Championships

Final
- Champion: (Australia) Carsten Ball
- Runner-up: (United States) Jesse Levine
- Score: 6–4, 7–6(2)

Events
Singles	Doubles
- Fifth Third Bank Tennis Championships

Harel Levy was the winner in 2009, but he chose to not participate this year.
Carsten Ball became the new champion, after he won 6–4, 7–6(2), against Jesse Levine.

== Seeds ==
1. (Australia) Carsten Ball (champion)
2. (Lithuania) Ričardas Berankis (second round, retired due to tricep strain)
3. (Brazil) João Souza (first round)
4. (United States) Kevin Kim (quarterfinals)
5. (United States) Jesse Levine (final)
6. (Chile) Paul Capdeville (quarterfinals)
7. (Canada) Peter Polansky (semifinals)
8. (Australia) Greg Jones (first round)

== Draw ==
Key

- Q = Qualifier
- WC = Wild card
- LL = Lucky loser
- Alt = Alternate
- ITF = ITF entry
- PR = Protected ranking
- SR = Special ranking
- SE = Special exempt
- JE = Junior exempt
- JR = Junior Accelerator Programme entrant
- CO = College Accelerator Programme entrant
- NG = Next Gen Accelerator Program entrant
- w/o = Walkover
- r = Retired
- d = Defaulted

=== Finals ===
Semifinals
1	(Australia) Carsten Ball	6	6
(United States) Alex Kuznetsov	3	2
5	(United States) Jesse Levine	6	7
(United States) Alex Bogomolov Jr.	4	6^{4}

Final
1	(Australia) Carsten Ball	6	7
5	(United States) Jesse Levine	4	6^{2}

=== Top half ===
First round
1	(Australia) C Ball	7	6
(Brazil) R Hocevar	5	1
WC	(United States) D Kudla	4	3
WC	(United States) Jarmere Jenkins	6	6
ALT	(South Africa) R Klaasen	6	7
(Australia) J Sirianni	1	5
(Australia) C Guccione	4	2
7	(Canada) P Polansky	6	6
4	(United States) K Kim	6	7
Q	(South Africa) F Wolmarans	2	5
(Japan) Y Sugita	4	6	3
Q	(Canada) P-L Duclos	6	2	6
(Canada) V Pospisil	6^{4}	1
(Canada) M Raonic	7	6
(United States) A Kuznetsov	6	6
8	(Australia) G Jones	2	2

Second round
1	(Australia) C Ball	7	6
WC	(United States) J Jenkins	6^{4}	1
ALT	(South Africa) R Klaasen	1	3
7	(Canada) P Polansky	6	6
4	(United States) K Kim	6^{2}	6	6
Q	(Canada) P-L Duclos	7	2	3
(Canada) M Raonic	3	0	r
(United States) A Kuznetsov	6	1

Quarterfinals
1	(Australia) C Ball	6	6
7	(Canada) P Polansky	3	3
4	(United States) K Kim	2	3
(United States) A Kuznetsov	6	6

Semifinals
1	(Australia) C Ball	6	6
(United States) A Kuznetsov	3	2

=== Bottom half ===
First round
5	(United States) J Levine	2	7	6
(United Kingdom) J Baker	6	6^{3}	1
WC	(United States) S Bangoura	2	1
Q	(Australia) B Klein	6	6
(Japan) T Suzuki	4	1
(Denmark) F Nielsen	6	6
ALT	(Ukraine) S Bubka	7	6
3	(Brazil) J Souza	6^{2}	1
6	(Chile) P Capdeville	6	6
Q	(China) M-X Gong	3	3
(Australia) M Matosevic	5	3
(South Africa) I van der Merwe	7	6
(United States) A Bogomolov Jr.	7	6
WC	(United States) Eric Quigley	5	0
(United States) M Yani	4	5
2	(Lithuania) R Berankis	6	7

Second round
5	(United States) J Levine	7	7
Q	(Australia) B Klein	6^{4}	6^{8}
(Denmark) F Nielsen	4	3
ALT	(Ukraine) S Bubka	6	6
6	(Chile) P Capdeville	7	6
(South Africa) I van der Merwe	6^{5}	4
(United States) A Bogomolov Jr.	6	4
2	(Lithuania) R Berankis	4	3	r

Quarterfinals
5	(United States) J Levine	6	6
ALT	(Ukraine) S Bubka	4	0
6	(Chile) P Capdeville	5	2
(United States) A Bogomolov Jr.	7	6

Semifinals
5	(United States) J Levine	6	7
(United States) A Bogomolov Jr.	4	6^{4}
