= Andrew Bennett (academic) =

Canadian civil servant (born 1972)

The Reverend Andrew Bennett

Ambassador for Religious Freedom
- In office February 19, 2013 – March 31, 2016
- Preceded by: position created
- Succeeded by: position abolished

Personal details
- Born: Andrew P. W. Bennet; August 1972 (age 54) Toronto, Ontario, Canada
- Education: Dalhousie University; McGill University; University of Edinburgh
- Occupation: Public intellectual
- Profession: Scholar

Andrew P. W. Bennett is a Canadian public intellectual. He was the first and only Canadian Ambassador for Religious Freedom, as the head of the Office of Religious Freedom, from the office's formation in 2013 to its closure in 2016.

== Early life ==
He received a Bachelor of Arts in History from Dalhousie University in 1995, a Master of Arts in History from McGill University in 1997, and a PhD in Politics from the University of Edinburgh in 2002.

He is a member of the clergy in the Ukrainian Greek-Catholic Church and serves as a Deacon at St. John the Baptist Ukrainian-Catholic Shrine in Ottawa. He is the past Vice-President and Chairman of the Metropolitan Andrey Sheptytsky Institute Foundation.

== Career ==
Before being appointed to lead Canada's Office of Religious Freedom on February 19, 2013, Andrew Bennett worked for the Privy Council Office, Export Development Canada and Natural Resources Canada in a variety of analytical, research, and corporate roles. He has also held roles as Professor and Dean at Augustine College in Ottawa, as a Scholar Expert on the Americas Desk with Oxford Analytica and as a Researcher with the University of Edinburgh's Institute on Governance where he focused on the process of devolution in Scotland. He currently is a Senior Fellow at Cardus, a Canadian faith-based think-tank as well as the Chair of the Cabinet of Canadians, an element of Faith in Canada 150 -a signature initiative of Cardus that seeks to emphasise the importance of religious faith in the lives of Canadians today and indeed throughout Canadian history as Canada marks its 150th birthday in 2017.
