= 2012 Erste Bank Open =

- Date: 13–21 October
- Edition: 38th
- Category: World Tour 250 Series
- Draw: 28S / 16D
- Prize money: €486,750
- Surface: Hard
- Location: Vienna, Austria
- Venue: Wiener Stadthalle

Champions

Singles
- (Argentina) Juan Martín del Potro

Doubles
- (Germany) Andre Begemann / (Germany) Martin Emmrich
- Vienna Open

The 2012 Erste Bank Open was a men's tennis tournament played on indoor hard courts. It was the 38th edition of the event known that year as the Erste Bank Open, and part of the ATP World Tour 250 Series of the 2012 ATP World Tour. It was held at the Wiener Stadthalle in Vienna, Austria, from 13 October through 21 October 2012. First-seeded Juan Martín del Potro won the singles title.

== Finals ==
=== Singles ===
- (Argentina) Juan Martín del Potro defeated (Slovenia) Grega Žemlja, 7–5, 6–3

=== Doubles ===
- (Germany) Andre Begemann / (Germany) Martin Emmrich defeated (Austria) Julian Knowle / (Slovakia) Filip Polášek, 6–4, 3–6, [10–4]

== Singles main-draw entrants ==
=== Seeds ===
| Country | Player | Rank^{1} | Seed |
|---|---|---|---|
| ARG | Juan Martín del Potro | 8 | 1 |
| SRB | Janko Tipsarević | 9 | 2 |
| GER | Tommy Haas | 21 | 3 |
| AUT | Jürgen Melzer | 35 | 4 |
| ITA | Fabio Fognini | 45 | 5 |
| NED | Robin Haase | 51 | 6 |
| FRA | Benoît Paire | 52 | 7 |
| BEL | Xavier Malisse | 57 | 8 |

- Seeds are based on the rankings of October 8, 2012

=== Other entrants ===
The following players received wildcards into the singles main draw:

- (Latvia) Ernests Gulbis
- (Austria) Andreas Haider-Maurer
- (Austria) Dominic Thiem

The following players received entry from the qualifying draw:

- (Belgium) Ruben Bemelmans
- (Germany) Daniel Brands
- (Canada) Vasek Pospisil
- (Slovenia) Grega Žemlja

=== Retirements ===
- (Slovenia) Aljaž Bedene
- (Spain) Guillermo García López (groin injury)

== Doubles main-draw entrants ==
=== Seeds ===
| Country | Player | Country | Player | Rank^{1} | Seed |
|---|---|---|---|---|---|
| AUT | Jürgen Melzer | AUT | Alexander Peya | 53 | 1 |
| AUT | Julian Knowle | SVK | Filip Polášek | 68 | 2 |
| PHI | Treat Conrad Huey | GBR | Dominic Inglot | 88 | 3 |
| GER | Dustin Brown | GER | Christopher Kas | 90 | 4 |

- Rankings are as of October 8, 2012

=== Other entrants ===
The following pairs received wildcards into the doubles main draw:

- (Austria) Martin Fischer / (Austria) Philipp Oswald
- (Austria) Andreas Haider-Maurer / (Austria) Maximilian Neuchrist
