= Jesse Levine =

Canadian-American tennis player (born 1987)

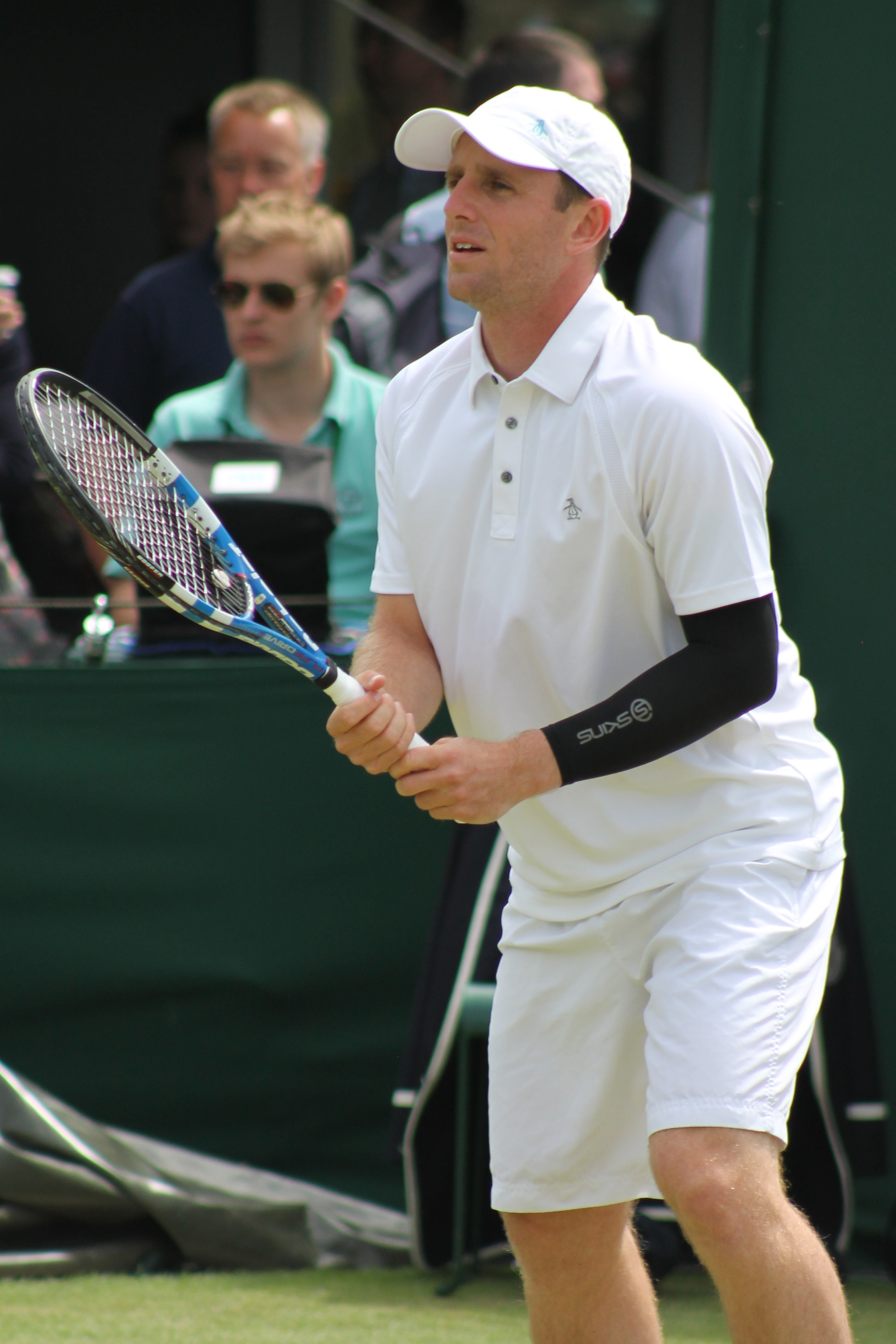
- Country (sports): United States (through 2012); Canada (2013–2014)
- Residence: Boca Raton, Florida, United States
- Born: October 15, 1987 (age 38) Ottawa, Ontario, Canada
- Height: 1.75 m (5 ft 9 in)
- Turned pro: 2007
- Retired: 2014
- Plays: Left-handed (two-handed backhand)
- College: University of Florida
- Prize money: US$1,131,456

Singles
- Career record: 31–64
- Career titles: 0
- Highest ranking: No. 69 (October 1, 2012)

Grand Slam singles results
- Australian Open: 2R (2008, 2013)
- French Open: 2R (2012)
- Wimbledon: 3R (2009)
- US Open: 2R (2009)

Doubles
- Career record: 17–21
- Career titles: 0
- Highest ranking: No. 119 (July 22, 2013)

Grand Slam doubles results
- Wimbledon: 3R (2013)
- US Open: 3R (2007, 2012)

Mixed doubles
- Career titles: 0

Grand Slam mixed doubles results
- US Open: 2R (2006)

Coaching career (2015–present)
- Madison Keys (2015–2016)

Jesse Levine (born October 15, 1987) is an American-Canadian former professional tennis player. He achieved his career-high singles rank of world No. 69 on October 1, 2012. Levine represented the United States through 2012, and he represented Canada starting in 2013.

As a 13-year-old, in 2001 Levine won the U.S. Clay Court 14 Nationals singles championship, and as a 15-year-old he won the USTA boys' 16s doubles championship with his doubles partner. As a 17-year-old, he won the 2005 Wimbledon boys' doubles championship. Playing one year of No. 1 singles as a freshman for the University of Florida in 2007, he lost only one match, finishing his career with a 24–1 record.

In June 2009, while representing the United States on tour, he scored his most significant victory to date, defeating world No. 24 (and former world No. 1) Marat Safin at Wimbledon. The following month he defeated the second top-50 player of his career, world No. 48 Philipp Petzschner. His most significant achievement in doubles was making the finals in the 2009 U.S. Men's Clay Court Championships, losing to the Bryan brothers.

Levine was the coach of Madison Keys from December 2015 to May 2016.

== Early life ==
Levine was born in Ottawa, Ontario, and grew up in Ottawa's Centrepointe neighbourhood. His father Nathan had played tennis for Penn State.

Jesse attended Hillel Academy of Ottawa. Off the court Levine, who is Jewish, keeps kosher at home, and he plays with a Star of David on his chain. He can read and write Hebrew. Levine, along with Dudi Sela, Shahar Pe'er, Sharon Fichman, and Camila Giorgi is one of a number of young Jewish tennis players who are highly ranked. "I have a lot of contact with the Israeli players, like Ram, Erlich, Sela, and Levy. They sometimes ask me when I will play for Israel in the Davis Cup", he said. He also appreciates the Jewish fans who cheer for him. At one tournament, they cheered and shouted out encouragement such as: "Come on, man, your opponent hasn't even had his bar mitzvah yet!"

As a youth, Levine took tennis lessons at the Ottawa Athletic Club. He and his family moved to Florida in the US when he was 13 years old, because his younger brother Daniel suffers from ulcerative colitis and the year-round warm weather was much better for him. Levine currently resides in Boca Raton, Florida. He said in 2009 that he at that point considered himself "100% American", saying that if he were to play Davis Cup, it would be for the US.

== Junior tennis career ==
In 2001 he defeated Donald Young in the final of the U.S. Clay Court 14 Nationals. He was trailing 0–5 in the final set when he came back for the win.

In 2003 he won the USTA boys 16s doubles championship with partner Jean Yves Aubone, and the Eddie Herr International Boys under-16s singles title. He finished the year ranked 11th in the USTA boys' 16 division. In 2004 he won the Eddie Herr International Boys 18s doubles championship with Michael Shabaz, an Iranian-born Assyrian-American.

At the 2005 USTA Junior Nationals, where he lost in the singles semifinals and doubles finals, both 7–6 in the third set, he was judged to have the best service return. He won the 2005 Wimbledon boys' doubles championship along with Michael Shabaz over Samuel Groth of Australia and Andrew Kennaugh of Great Britain. "If you believe in yourself anything can happen", said Levine. He also reached the quarterfinals of the Junior Wimbledon boys' singles tournament that year. Levine was selected to go to the 2005 Maccabiah Games just after winning the doubles, but decided against it as he was too tired. He finished 2005 ranked 23rd in the USTA national junior rankings.

He was the runner-up at the 2006 U.S. Junior National Championship to world No. 1 Junior Donald Young, forfeiting in the finals due to food poisoning. He was voted as having the best backhand.

His highest International Tennis Federation World Junior Ranking was No. 14 (with a 61–27 singles win–loss record and a 61–22 doubles win–loss record).

Junior Slam results – Singles:

Australian Open: 1R (2005)
French Open: 3R (2005)
Wimbledon: QF (2005)
US Open: 2R (2005)

He attended Boca Prep International School on a soccer scholarship for a year and a half and switched to the University of Miami Online High School, where he was class of 2007. The online school offered an academic program for athletes who were too busy to attend traditional bricks-and-mortar high schools. Levine did most of his junior training at the Evert Tennis Academy in Boca Raton, which is adjacent to Boca Prep (where he received the senior male sportsmanship award from Chris Evert and was named the academy's Male Player of the Year by his peers), and the Nick Bollettieri Tennis Academy in Bradenton, Florida for two years, and then decided to go to college.

== College career (2007) ==
Levine enrolled in the University of Florida in Gainesville, Florida during the spring of 2007, and played for the Florida Gators men's tennis team. He subsequently withdrew from the university in August 2007 to turn pro.

=== Singles ===
Levine was 24–1 playing No. 1 singles for the Gators as a freshman. He won all but 3 of his matches in straight sets.

In March 2007 he beat 6' 9", 236 pound John Isner, a senior at University of Georgia who was then the No. 1 player in college tennis, who had been undefeated in his prior 46 matches, and who did not lose another regular-season match all season. On May 23, 2007, Levine lost his first college match, in the quarterfinals in the NCAA Men's Singles to Washington's Alex Slovic. He was ranked # 3 in singles by the NCAA in the final May 2007 standings, only because he did not have as many matches against ranked opponents as the top two players (Isner and Somdev Devvarman), and he was the only freshman in the top 22.

=== Doubles ===
Levine also played No. 1 doubles for the Gators with junior Greg Ouellette, and the duo was 21–3 in 2007, rising to # 3 in the final NCAA rankings. Levine and Ouellette were defeated in the quarterfinals of the 2007 NCAA Men's Doubles championships by the eventual winners, Middle Tennessee State's Marco Born and Andreas Siljestrom.

=== Awards ===
Levine was named the Intercollegiate Tennis Association (ITA) 2007 National Rookie of the Year, and was one of 10 players nationally to be selected to the 2007 ITA All-America Team for NCAA Division I men's tennis in both singles and doubles play. Levine was named 2007 Southeastern Conference (SEC) Freshman of the Year and was named to the 2007 men's tennis All-SEC first team. He was named the SEC Men's Tennis Player of the Week twice in 2007.

== Pro tournaments ==
=== 2007 ===
Levine missed the Gators' first dual match of the season, on January 31, 2007, because he was at the Delray Beach International Tennis Championships, where he defeated Łukasz Kubot of Poland (ranked # 118) 6–3, 6–2, and Kevin Kim of the US (ranked # 107) 6–2, 6–2, but lost to Benjamin Becker of Germany (ranked # 54) 3–6, 3–6. He also received a wild card into the BMW Tennis Championship, where he lost 6–7^{(4–7)}, 6–7^{(3–7)}, to Gaël Monfils.

In July 2007 Levine travelled to Dubai when top-ranked Roger Federer invited him there to practice for 10 days. "I thought it was a joke ... I thought it was one of my college buddies playing a prank on me, but it was for real", Levine said. Twice he and Federer played match sets, both of which Federer won, 6–4.

I had an unbelievable season, but in order to take tennis to the next level, I have to keep playing guys at the top level. College tennis is amazing, but I feel my game is ready.

— Levine

Levine left college prior to play as a wildcard at the 2007 U.S. Open, his first professional tournament as a professional. He was defeated by world # 4 Nikolay Davydenko in the first round, 4–6, 0–6, 1–6. "I was really nervous", Levine said, "but it was an amazing experience." In doubles, however, he won his first round match, pairing with Alex Kuznetsov, over Dominik Hrbatý of Slovakia and Harel Levy of Israel, 6–1, 6–4, and their second round match upsetting 7th-seeded Frenchmen Arnaud Clément and Michaël Llodra 7–6^{(7–5)}, 6–4, before losing in the third round to 9th-seeded Czechs Lukáš Dlouhý and Pavel Vízner, 4–6, 5–7.

In November 2007, Levine won his first pro title, the $75,000 Music City Challenger in Nashville, Tennessee, along the way beating world # 109 Robert Kendrick of the US, 7–5, 6–4, # 148 Sam Warburg of the US, 4–6, 6–3, 6–3, and # 170 Dušan Vemić of Serbia, 6–2, 7–5. "That first pro title was a big deal for me", Levine said. "I called my parents to tell them I'd won. I was pretty excited."

That same month, Levine won the $50,000 JSM Challenger in Champaign, Illinois, at the University of Illinois. In the second round he defeated # 197 Kevin Kim, 6–1, 7–5, and in the semifinals he again beat Isner, now world # 118, this time 7–6^{(7–5)}, 6–3. In the finals Levine topped Donald Young (world # 106), 7–6^{(7–4)}, 7–6^{(7–4)}; he did not lose a set all week, and moved up in the rankings to # 192 in the world.

Still later in November, he began the $50,000 Knoxville Challenger tournament in Tennessee by defeating former US Junior champion Michael McClune, 6–4, 6–1, in the first round, but three rounds later lost to Kevin Kim in the semifinals. The loss broke Levine's 16-match winning streak.

In early December, he and Andy Roddick defeated Robert Kendrick and Amer Delic 7–6, 6–4, in a fast-paced match on Har-Tru at the OMNI Healthcare/Harris "Rally with Roddick" charity tennis exhibition in Indian Harbour Beach.

In late December Levine won a wild card berth into the main draw of the Australian Open. He won the spot by defeating Wayne Odesnik and Kuznetsov in a round-robin tournament format. "It definitely feels good not having it just handed out", Levine said after defeating Odesnik 6–4, 6–0. He trained and played sets with Max Mirnyi, Xavier Malisse, Andy Murray, and Tommy Haas. Levine played qualifying in a couple of pre-Grand Slam tournaments in Adelaide and Sydney. He still flew coach Down Under. "I'll have to make a lot more money before I can go first class", he said.

Levine ended the year with a 20–10 match record, and ranked # 192.

=== 2008 ===
That's nothing I can control. I have to come up with other things like my speed, and my conditioning, take their legs from them. They've got bigger legs . ... Me, I'm just a little guy running around trying to make every ball.

— Levine, responding to a comment that just about every player out there is far bigger and stronger than he is.

In January 2008, at the Australian Open, Levine beat Martín Vassallo Argüello of Argentina, a 26-year-old veteran ranked # 77 in the world, to advance to the Open's second round. There, Levine played a scrappy match against fellow lefty, No. 24 seed Jarkko Nieminen. But despite serving for the set at 5–3 in both the second and third sets, Levine went down 2–6, 5–7, 6–7^{(2–7)} to the Finn. "I felt like I was right there, and definitely had my chances in the second and third (sets). I have to work on converting a little better", said Levine. "Maybe I got a little too antsy, and tried to go for a little too much, maybe stepped too hard on the pedal instead of taking a foot off."

At the personal request of U.S. Davis Cup captain Patrick McEnroe, Levine was a practice partner with the U.S. Davis Cup team in early February in Austria, hitting with Andy Roddick, James Blake, and twins Bob Bryan and Mike Bryan. "First of all, he's a lefty, but also, Jesse has shown a lot of promise since last summer, improved his ranking a lot, and he's a great kid and incredibly hard worker", McEnroe said. "Our guys have a good read on which young guys are working really hard, and they were pushing to invite Jesse. It will be a great experience for him, and he'll help our guys a lot." "One day I played four sets. It was a lot of fun, but my body was sore", Levine said. "The guys are so cool."

In February Levine defeated # 81-ranked Steve Darcis of Belgium in the first round of the San Jose Open, 6–3, 2–6, 6–4, before losing to James Blake in the second round. In May he won all five of his matches, dropping only one set, to win the Bradenton, Florida Challenger event. He also won the Türk Telecom İzmir Cup challenger tournament in doubles in Turkey, with partner Kei Nishikori of Japan.

When you make the top 100, it really changes everything. And I feel like I'm just on the other side, knocking.

— Levine, after winning his first round match at Wimbledon in 2008, to rise to # 124 in the world rankings.

In June at Wimbledon, after qualifying by winning three matches, and then getting "shivers" on his arms as he walked out for his opening match, he beat world # 85 Donald Young in the first round, 4–6, 6–2, 6–3, 6–4. It was the first four-set match he had ever played. The key was Levine's persistent net play; he approached net 32 times, winning 25 of the points. In the next round he lost, in his first five-set match ever, to Jürgen Melzer 6–4, 2–6, 6–3, 4–6, 1–6.

In July in Newport on the grass courts at the International Tennis Hall of Fame, he beat No. 5 seeded, world # 83 John Isner 6–3, 6–1. Later in the month he beat Benjamin Becker of Germany, 6–3, 3–6, 7–6^{(8–6)}, at the Rogers Cup in Toronto. In August at the New Haven, Connecticut International Series, he beat world # 67 Guillermo García López of Spain 6–0, 6–3, and world # 61 Steve Darcis, 2–0, retired. He broke into the top 100, at 96, on August 25.

In October Federer again invited Levine to join him for an extended practice session in Dubai, as preparation for the Australian Open.

=== 2009 ===
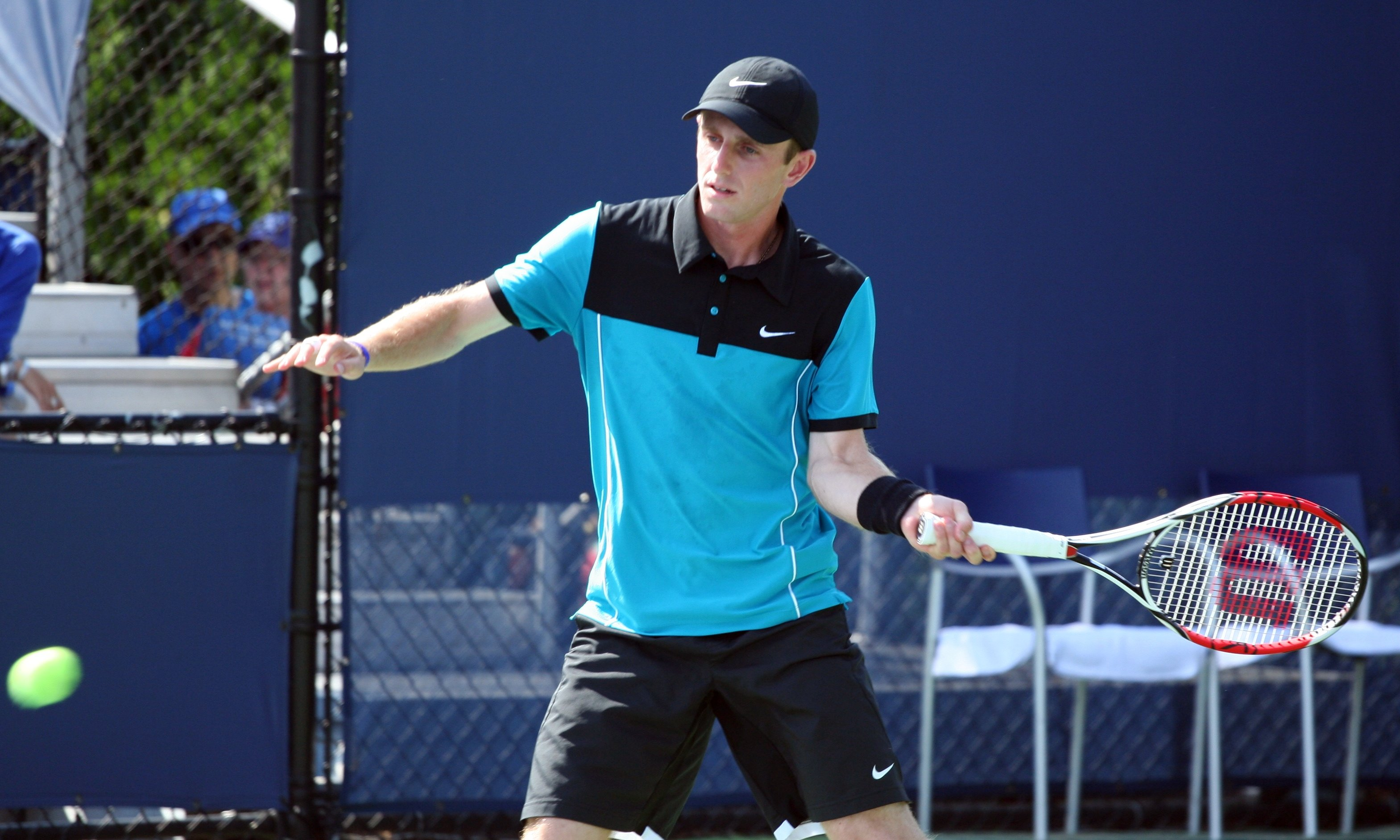
Levine at the 2009 US Open

In April at the US Men's Clay Court Championships in Houston, Texas, Levine, ranked 289th in doubles in the world, and doubles partner Ryan Sweeting from the Bahamas, ranked 405th in doubles, made it into the draw via wild card, and in the first round defeated 3rd-seeded world doubles # 40 Lucas Arnold Ker and world doubles # 61 Martin Damm, 6–2, 6–4. In the quarterfinals they beat world doubles # 66 Jaroslav Levinský and # 82 Pavel Vízner, 7–6^{(8–6)}, 6–4, and in the semifinals they defeated 2nd-seeded world doubles # 30 Ashley Fisher and # 29 Jordan Kerr 3–6, 6–3, [10–4]. They lost to Americans Bob and Mike Bryan, ranked # 1 in the world, in the doubles final, 1–6, 2–6.

Levine qualified for the main draw at Wimbledon 2009, after defeating Australian Samuel Groth 6–4, 6–7^{(3–7)}, 7–5, German Dieter Kindlmann 6–2, 6–3, and German Matthias Bachinger 6–2, 7–5, 6–2.

In the first round of the main Wimbledon draw, in the biggest win of his career Levine upset world # 24 (and former world # 1, and two-time Grand Slam champion) Marat Safin of Russia 6–2, 3–6, 7–6^{(7–4)}, 6–4. Levine was ranked 133rd going into the tournament. The Guardian described Levine as "a feisty little terrier who kept harrying away at his towering opponent", and The New York Times noted that "If you stand them side by side" Levine and Safin "look a little like David and Goliath. Levine ... is seven inches (178 mm) shorter and 45 pounds lighter than Safin, but when it counted ... the American was faster and stronger." When Levine clinched the win he looked up and pointed into the sky in acknowledgement of his grandmother Lillian Kimmel, who had died three years prior. Safin said that he had known before the match that Levine was a "talented lefty, tough player, fast ... gonna go for it. He's a tough one."

In the second round Levine defeated Uruguay's top tennis player, Pablo Cuevas, 6–2, 6–1, 4–6, 4–6, 6–3. "I think my win the other day against Marat really gave me a confidence booster", he said. It was Levine's first five-set victory, and only his second five-set match. "I could have played a little bit longer", he said, "But I'm glad I didn't have to." Levine and Andy Roddick were the only two American men left standing in the tournament, and Levine was also by far the lowest-ranked player left in the men's draw. Levine next faced Olympic gold medalist, world # 18, 19th seed Stanislas Wawrinka of Switzerland, in Levine's first trip to the third round in a Grand Slam. "Once again I'm the underdog", said Levine." "I've got nothing to lose, so I'll go out there swinging away. For the first set and a half of their match, Levine (described by The Sunday Times as having "the pugnacity of Jimmy Connors and the fashion sense of Eminem") looked as though it was he who was the top 20 player, as he hit low forehands and approached and dominated the net, but in the end Wawrinka prevailed, 7–5, 5–7, 3–6, 3–6, despite Levine saving 17 of 23 break points in the match.

Levine next played in the Hall of Fame Tennis Championships in Newport, Rhode Island, making it as far as the quarterfinals, and along the way upsetting sixth-seeded world # 48 German Philipp Petzschner, 7–6^{(7–3)}, 6–2. It was his second win over a top-50 player in three weeks.

In late July Levine qualified for the 2009 Indianapolis Tennis Championships in singles. In doubles Levine partnered Israeli Dudi Sela, and defeated Denis Istomin of Uzbekistan and Josselin Ouanna of France 6–4, 6–4 to make it to the quarterfinals.

Entering the 2009 US Open via wild card, he won his first round match in straight sets over Russian Teymuraz Gabashvili 7–5, 6–1, 6–2.

=== 2010–11 ===
Levine skipped the 2010 Australian Open and 2010 French Open, and played some Challengers instead. In June, Levine reached the second round in doubles at the 2010 Wimbledon Championships, but lost in the first round in singles to Feliciano López 6–7^{(2–7)}, 6–3, 2–6, 3–6. He lost in the final of the Lexington Challenger to Carsten Ball 4–6, 6–7^{(2–7)} at the end of July. A week later he reached the doubles final of the Challenger in Vancouver. Levine had to withdraw in the second round of qualifying at the 2010 US Open to undergo emergency root canal surgery.

At the beginning of 2011, Levine played on the ITF Futures Circuit to improve his ranking. In March, he reached the doubles final at the tournament in Sherbrooke. He won the Futures in Indian Harbour Beach in June, defeating Jeff Dadamo 6–4, 6–4 in the final. In September, Levine reached back-to-back Futures finals in Canada, winning in Toronto 6–1, 6–0 over Rhyne Williams, but losing in Markham to Peter Polansky. He won his third Futures title of the year in Mansfield with a 6–4, 6–3 victory over John-Patrick Smith. Levine reached the final of the Challenger in Charlottesville at the beginning of November. He won his first Challenger title in three years a week later, beating Brian Baker 6–2, 6–3 in Knoxville. Levine received a main draw wild card for the 2012 Australian Open after winning the USTA's Australian Open Wild Card Playoff.

=== 2012 ===
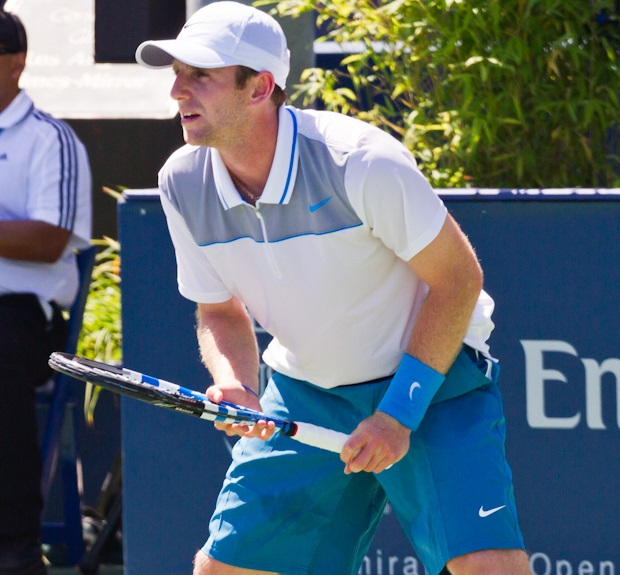
Levine in 2012

Levine lost in the first round of the 2012 Australian Open to Marcel Granollers in five sets, 0–6, 6–7^{(4–7)}, 7–5, 7–5, 3–6. In February, he won his fifth Challenger title thanks to a 6–4, 6–4 win over Steve Darcis in Dallas.

He lost in the first round of the Masters 1000 in Indian Wells and Miami. Levine reached the second round of the French Open in June, his first Grand Slam main draw win in almost three years. He also reached the second round at Wimbledon. He lost in the second round of the Masters 1000 in Cincinnati. In September, Levine lost in the first round of the US Open but made it to the third round in doubles. Also in September, he reached the quarterfinals of the ATP tournament in Moselle in both singles and doubles. In October, he lost in the doubles quarterfinals of the ATP 250 in Vienna.

Levine applied to the International Tennis Federation in late 2012 to represent Canada in future Davis Cup play.

=== 2013 ===
Levine started his season in Brisbane where he qualified, but lost in the first round to Alejandro Falla. He played his first official tournament as a Canadian in Auckland, where he qualified for the main draw of an ATP tournament for the second straight week. He made it to the quarterfinals, after wins over local player Daniel King-Turner and Brian Baker, before losing to Sam Querrey. At the Australian Open, Levine defeated former world No. 5 Tommy Robredo in the first round, but lost to 14th-seed Gilles Simon in the next round.

Levine was defeated by Japan's Kei Nishikori in the first round of the French Open. At Wimbledon, he made it to the second round with a five-set victory over Guido Pella in his opening match, before losing to world No. 8 Juan Martín del Potro in the next round. Levine reached the second round at the Rogers Cup in August as a wildcard, but was defeated by Rafael Nadal.

Beginning in the spring of 2013 during grass court season, Levine began suffering from an elbow problem and numbness in his pinky finger. The problem continued for over a year. He stopped playing tennis after the Rogers Cup to rehab his elbow, which was first diagnosed as golfer's elbow, and had non-invasive surgery in the fall of 2013.

=== 2014 ===
Levine's elbow problem continued into 2014. By July 2014 he was back to hitting on practice courts, and though his elbow was troubling him when serving he trained during the summer with Andy Murray. He was chosen as a hitting partner for Canada's Davis Cup team in September. However, when he attempted to come back in October after not playing competitively for 11 months, the problem recurred and was re-aggravated during a match in Houston. Levine was scheduled to have surgery in October 2014, either Tommy John surgery or a different surgery to move his ulnar nerve and thus relieve the numbness in his little finger.

Levine retired at the end of 2014 due to an elbow injury.

=== Accolades ===
In 2017, Levine was inducted into the Ottawa Jewish Sports Hall of Fame.

== Style of play ==
Among his strengths as a player are that he is extremely fast and explosive, "quick-footed" with "great feet", "a superb forehand", and what John McEnroe has referred to as "great racket speed"; he is "a hard worker and a natural leader." He also runs everything down. "He's got a great heart", said Larry Stefanki, who coached Andy Roddick and has previously worked with John McEnroe, Marcelo Ríos, Fernando González and Tim Henman. "A lot of players today are fast and fit, but just don't seem to play every point at 100%. It's like they're almost on cruise control and then want to play hard when it gets to 4-all or 5-all", Stefanki said.

When he hears that he's too small, not big enough, well, he just never listened. He says, 'I'm going to play this game.'

— Nathan Levine, Jesse's father

"I think because Jesse's so small and he doesn't want to give any free points, he tries every point 100%. That's a big asset out there." At 5' 9" and 150 pounds, Levine is smaller than most professional tennis players.

== Personal ==
Levine had a German Shepherd dog, named "Sarite". He is also good friends with Canadian NHL ice hockey centre Jason Spezza and a big fan of the Ottawa Senators and Miami Dolphins. On April 28, 2014 Jesse was made an honorary brother of the Alpha Epsilon Pi fraternity.

== ATP career finals ==
=== Doubles: 1 (1 runner-up) ===
Legend Grand Slam Tournaments (0–0) ATP World Tour Finals (0–0) ATP World Tour Masters 1000 (0–0) ATP World Tour 500 Series (0–0) ATP World Tour 250 Series (0–1)	Titles by surface Hard (0–0) Clay (0–1) Grass (0–0)

Result	W–L	Date	Tournament	Tier	Surface	Partner	Opponents	Score
Loss	0–1	Apr 2009	U.S. Men's Clay Court Championships, United States	250 Series	Clay	(United States) Ryan Sweeting	(United States) Bob Bryan (United States) Mike Bryan	1–6, 2–6

== ATP Challenger & ITF Futures finals ==
=== Singles: 14 (9 titles, 5 runners-up) ===
Legend (singles) ATP Challenger Tour (5–4) ITF Futures Tour (4–1)	Titles by surface Hard (6–4) Clay (3–1) Grass (0–0) Carpet (0–0)

Result	W–L	Date	Tournament	Tier	Surface	Opponent	Score
Win	1–0	Nov 2007	Nashville, United States	Challenger	Hard (i)	(United States) Alex Kuznetsov	3–6, 6–2, 7–6^{(7–5)}
Win	2–0	Nov 2007	Champaign, United States	Challenger	Hard (i)	(United States) Donald Young	7–6^{(7–4)}, 7–6^{(7–4)}
Win	3–0	May 2008	Bradenton, United States	Challenger	Clay	(United States) Robert Kendrick	6–3, 5–7, 7–6^{(7–3)}
Loss	3–1	May 2009	Alessandria, Italy	Challenger	Clay	(Slovenia) Blaž Kavčič	5–7, 3–6
Loss	3–2	Oct 2009	Sacramento, United States	Challenger	Hard	(Colombia) Santiago Giraldo	6–7^{(4–7)}, 1–6
Loss	3–3	Jul 2010	Lexington, United States	Challenger	Hard	(Australia) Carsten Ball	4–6, 6–7^{(2–7)}
Win	4–3	Jun 2011	USA F17, Indian Harbour Beach	Futures	Clay	(United States) Jeff Dadamo	6–4, 6–4
Win	5–3	Sep 2011	Canada F5, Toronto	Futures	Clay	(United States) Jordan Cox	6–2, 6–2
Win	6–3	Sep 2011	Canada F6, Toronto	Futures	Hard	(United States) Rhyne Williams	6–1, 6–0
Loss	6–4	Sep 2011	Canada F7, Markham	Futures	Hard	(Canada) Peter Polansky	4–6, 6–3, 5-7
Win	7–4	Oct 2011	USA F27, Mansfield	Futures	Hard	(Australia) John-Patrick Smith	6–4, 6–3
Loss	7–5	Nov 2011	Charlottesville, United States	Challenger	Hard	(South Africa) Izak Van Der Merwe	6–3, 3–6, 4-6
Win	8–5	Nov 2011	Knoxville, United States	Challenger	Hard	(United States) Brian Baker	6–2, 6–3
Win	9–5	Feb 2012	Dallas, United States	Challenger	Hard (i)	(Belgium) Steve Darcis	6–4, 6–4

=== Doubles: 6 (3 titles, 3 runner-up) ===
Legend (doubles) ATP Challenger Tour (2–1) ITF Futures Tour (1–2)	Doubles by surface Hard (3–3) Clay (0–0) Grass (0–0) Carpet (0–0)

Result	W–L	Date	Tournament	Tier	Surface	Opponent	Score	
Win	1–0	Nov 2005	Canada F3, Montreal	Futures	Hard	(Canada) Clay Donato	(Canada) Peter Polansky (Canada) Adil Shamasdin	6–2, 6–7^{(5-7)}, 6-3
Loss	1–1	Jan 2006	USA F3, Boca Raton	Futures	Hard	(United States) Michael Shabaz	(United States) Brian Wilson (United States) Jeremy Wurtzman	2–6, 6–7^{(4-7)}
Win	2–1	Jun 2008	Izmir, Turkey	Challenger	Hard	(Japan) Kei Nishikori	(United States) Nathan Thompson (Thailand) Danai Udomchoke	6–1, 7–5
Win	3–1	Nov 2008	Louisville, United States	Challenger	Hard (i)	(India) Prakash Amritraj	(Canada) Frank Dancevic (Serbia) Dušan Vemić	6–3, 7–6^{(12–10)}
Loss	3–2	Aug 2010	Vancouver, Canada	Challenger	Hard	(United States) Ryan Harrison	(Philippines) Treat Conrad Huey (United Kingdom) Dominic Inglot	4–6, 5–7
Loss	3–3	Mar 2011	Canada F2, Sherbrooke	Futures	Hard	(United States) Brett Joelson	(France) Vincent Stouff (France) Charles-Antoine Brezac	3–6, 6–3, [5-10]

== Junior Grand Slam finals ==
=== Doubles: 1 (1 title) ===
Result	Year	Tournament	Surface	Partner	Opponents	Score
Win	2005	Wimbledon	Grass	(United States) Michael Shabaz	(Australia) Sam Groth (United Kingdom) Andrew Kennaugh	6–4, 6–1

== Performance timelines ==
Key
W	F	SF	QF	#R	RR	Q#	DNQ	A	NH

(W) winner; (F) finalist; (SF) semifinalist; (QF) quarterfinalist; (#R) rounds 4, 3, 2, 1; (RR) round-robin stage; (Q#) qualification round; (DNQ) did not qualify; (A) absent; (NH) not held; (SR) strike rate (events won / competed); (W–L) win–loss record.

=== Singles ===
Tournament	2005	2006	2007	2008	2009	2010	2011	2012	2013	SR	W–L	Win %
Grand Slam tournaments
Australian Open	A	A	A	2R	A	A	A	1R	2R	0 / 3	2–3	40%
French Open	A	A	A	Q1	Q1	A	A	2R	1R	0 / 2	1–2	33%
Wimbledon	A	A	A	2R	3R	1R	A	2R	2R	0 / 5	5–5	50%
US Open	Q1	Q2	1R	1R	2R	Q1	A	1R	Q1	0 / 4	1–4	20%
Win–loss	0–0	0–0	0–1	2–3	3–2	0–1	0–0	2–4	2–3	0 / 14	9–14	39%
ATP World Tour Masters 1000
Indian Wells Masters	A	A	A	1R	Q1	1R	A	1R	Q2	0 / 3	0–3	0%
Miami Open	A	A	A	1R	1R	Q2	Q1	1R	1R	0 / 4	0–4	0%
Madrid Open	A	A	A	A	A	A	A	A	1R	0 / 1	0–1	0%
Italian Open	A	A	A	A	A	A	A	A	Q1	0 / 0	0–0	0%
Canadian Open	A	A	A	2R	1R	A	Q2	Q1	2R	0 / 3	2–3	40%
Cincinnati Masters	A	A	A	1R	Q1	A	A	2R	A	0 / 2	1–2	33%
Win–loss	0–0	0–0	0–0	1–4	0–2	0–1	0–0	1–3	1–3	0 / 13	3–13	19%

=== Doubles ===
Tournament	2006	2007	2008	2009	2010	2011	2012	2013	SR	W–L	Win %
Grand Slam tournaments
Australian Open	A	A	A	A	A	A	A	A	0 / 0	0–0	–
French Open	A	A	A	A	A	A	A	A	0 / 0	0–0	–
Wimbledon	A	A	1R	A	2R	A	A	3R	0 / 3	3–3	50%
US Open	1R	3R	1R	2R	A	A	3R	A	0 / 5	5–5	50%
Win–loss	0–1	2–1	0–2	1–1	1–1	0–0	2–1	2–1	0 / 8	8–8	50%

== See also ==
- Florida Gators
- List of Florida Gators tennis players
- List of notable Jewish tennis players
