= 2011 Challenger Banque Nationale de Rimouski – Doubles =

Doubles
- 2011 Challenger Banque Nationale de Rimouski

Final
- Champions: (Philippines) Treat Conrad Huey (Canada) Vasek Pospisil
- Runners-up: (United Kingdom) David Rice (United Kingdom) Sean Thornley
- Score: 6–0, 6–1

Events
Singles	Doubles
← 2010 ·	Challenger de Rimouski	· 2012 →

Kaden Hensel and Adam Hubble were the defending champions but decided not to participate this year.
Treat Conrad Huey and Vasek Pospisil won the final against David Rice and Sean Thornley 6–0, 6–1.

== Seeds ==
1. (Philippines) Treat Conrad Huey / (Canada) Vasek Pospisil (champions)
2. (Denmark) Frederik Nielsen / (United States) Travis Parrott (semifinals)
3. (Australia) Sam Groth / (United States) Bobby Reynolds (semifinals)
4. (France) Charles-Antoine Brézac / (France) Vincent Stouff (second round)

== Draw ==
=== Key ===
- Q = Qualifier
- WC = Wild card
- LL = Lucky loser
- Alt = Alternate
- SE = Special exempt
- PR = Protected ranking
- ITF = ITF entry
- JE = Junior exempt
- w/o = Walkover
- r = Retired
- d = Defaulted
- SR = Special ranking

=== Draw ===
First round
1	(Philippines) TC Huey (Canada) V Pospisil	6	7
(United States) Brett Joelson (Australia) Nima Roshan	0	6^{3}
WC	(Canada) Daniel Chu (Canada) Robert Rotaru	3	2
(Italy) M Marrai (Italy) M Viola	6	6
3	(Australia) S Groth (United States) B Reynolds	6	7
(United States) K Kim (Canada) P Polansky	3	5
(United States) JP Fruttero (United States) N Monroe	6	4
WC	(Canada) Ahmed El-Tabakh (Canada) Mo Niaki	0	0^{r}
(United States) M McClune (United States) G Oullette	4	4
(United Kingdom) D Rice (United Kingdom) S Thornley	6	6
(United States) A El Mihdawy (Israel) A Weintraub	3	5
4	(France) Charles-Antoine Brézac (France) Vincent Stouff	6	7
WC	(Czech Republic) Jan Blecha (Canada) Pavel Krainik	3	1
(Canada) P Bester (Canada) Kamil Pajkowski	6	6
(Moldova) R Borvanov (New Zealand) A Sitak	3	1
2	(Denmark) F Nielsen (United States) T Parrott	6	6

Quarterfinals
1	(Philippines) TC Huey (Canada) V Pospisil
(Italy) M Marrai (Italy) M Viola	w/o
3	(Australia) S Groth (United States) B Reynolds	6	7
(United States) JP Fruttero (United States) N Monroe	2	5
(United Kingdom) D Rice (United Kingdom) S Thornley	6	6
4	(France) Charles-Antoine Brézac (France) Vincent Stouff	3	2
(Canada) P Bester (Canada) Kamil Pajkowski	4	4
2	(Denmark) F Nielsen (United States) T Parrott	6	6

Semifinals
1	(Philippines) TC Huey (Canada) V Pospisil	6	6
3	(Australia) S Groth (United States) B Reynolds	4	4
(United Kingdom) D Rice (United Kingdom) S Thornley	5	6	[10]
2	(Denmark) F Nielsen (United States) T Parrott	7	3	[8]

Final
1	(Philippines) TC Huey (Canada) V Pospisil	6	6
(United Kingdom) D Rice (United Kingdom) S Thornley	0	1
