= 2009 Virginia National Bank Men's Pro Championship – Doubles =

Doubles
- 2009 Virginia National Bank Men's Pro Championship

Final
- Champions: (Germany) Martin Emmrich (Sweden) Andreas Siljeström
- Runners-up: (United Kingdom) Dominic Inglot (United States) Rylan Rizza
- Score: 6–4, 3–6, [11–9]

Events
Singles	Doubles
← 2008 ·	Virginia National Bank Men's Pro Championship	· 2010 →

Martin Emmrich and Andreas Siljeström became the first champions of this tournament, by defeating Dominic Inglot and Rylan Rizza 6–4, 3–6, [11–9] in the final.

== Seeds ==
1. (Philippines) Treat Conrad Huey / (India) Harsh Mankad (first round)
2. (Australia) Kaden Hensel / (Australia) Adam Hubble (semifinals)
3. (Germany) Martin Emmrich / (Sweden) Andreas Siljeström (champions)
4. (Serbia) Ilija Bozoljac / (United States) Nicholas Monroe (first round)

== Draw ==
=== Key ===
- Q = Qualifier
- WC = Wild card
- LL = Lucky loser
- Alt = Alternate
- SE = Special exempt
- PR = Protected ranking
- ITF = ITF entry
- JE = Junior exempt
- w/o = Walkover
- r = Retired
- d = Defaulted
- SR = Special ranking

=== Draw ===
First round
1	(Philippines) TC Huey (India) H Mankad	6^{1}	5
WC	(United States) C Parr (United States) T Paul	7	7
LL	(United States) D Courtney (United States) L Singer	7	4	[4]
(South Africa) K Anderson (United States) D Young	6^{5}	6	[10]
3	(Germany) M Emmrich (Sweden) A Siljeström	7	4	[10]
(South Africa) R Klaasen (South Africa) I van der Merwe	6^{5}	6	[7]
(Romania) C Gârd (Latvia) D Pavlovs	1	6^{5}
Q	(United States) B Battistone (United States) D Battistone	6	7
(United States) K Kim (Philippines) C Mamiit	6^{4}	3
(Bulgaria) G Dimitrov (Sweden) F Prpic	7	6
WC	(United Kingdom) D Inglot (United States) R Rizza	7	7
4	(Serbia) I Bozoljac (United States) N Monroe	5	6^{0}
(United States) S Jenkins (United States) J Witten	6	6
(Croatia) R Karanušić (Slovenia) G Žemlja	3	3
WC	(United States) R Harrison (United States) M McClune	3	2
2	(Australia) K Hensel (Australia) A Hubble	6	6

Quarterfinals
WC	(United States) C Parr (United States) T Paul	3	4
(South Africa) K Anderson (United States) D Young	6	6
3	(Germany) M Emmrich (Sweden) A Siljeström	7	7
Q	(United States) B Battistone (United States) D Battistone	6^{5}	5
(Bulgaria) G Dimitrov (Sweden) F Prpic	4	1
WC	(United Kingdom) D Inglot (United States) R Rizza	6	6
(United States) S Jenkins (United States) J Witten	5	1
2	(Australia) K Hensel (Australia) A Hubble	7	6

Semifinals
(South Africa) K Anderson (United States) D Young	4	6^{8}
3	(Germany) M Emmrich (Sweden) A Siljeström	6	7
WC	(United Kingdom) D Inglot (United States) R Rizza	6	3	[10]
2	(Australia) K Hensel (Australia) A Hubble	4	6	[8]

Finals
3	(Germany) M Emmrich (Sweden) A Siljeström	6	3	[11]
WC	(United Kingdom) D Inglot (United States) R Rizza	4	6	[9]
