= 2009 Knoxville Challenger – Singles =

Singles
- 2009 Knoxville Challenger

Final
- Champion: (United States) Taylor Dent
- Runner-up: (Serbia) Ilija Bozoljac
- Score: 6–3, 7–6(6)

Events
Singles	Doubles
← 2008 ·	Knoxville Challenger	· 2010 →

Bobby Reynolds, who was the defending champion, chose to not compete this year.
Taylor Dent won in the final 6–3, 7–6(6), against Ilija Bozoljac.

== Seeds ==
1. (United States) Wayne Odesnik (quarterfinals)
2. (United States) Michael Russell (second round)
3. (United States) Taylor Dent (champion)
4. (United States) Kevin Kim (first round)
5. (United States) Jesse Levine (first round)
6. (India) Somdev Devvarman (first round)
7. (South Africa) Kevin Anderson (quarterfinals)
8. (United States) Ryan Sweeting (semifinals)

== Draw ==
=== Key ===
- Q = Qualifier
- WC = Wild card
- LL = Lucky loser
- Alt = Alternate
- SE = Special exempt
- PR = Protected ranking
- ITF = ITF entry
- JE = Junior exempt
- w/o = Walkover
- r = Retired
- d = Defaulted
- SR = Special ranking

=== Finals ===
Semifinals
8	(United States) Ryan Sweeting	6^{3}	5
3	(United States) Taylor Dent	7	7
(Serbia) Ilija Bozoljac	6	6
(Slovenia) Grega Žemlja	3	4

Final
3	(United States) Taylor Dent	6	7
(Serbia) Ilija Bozoljac	3	6^{6}

=== Top half ===
First round
1	(United States) W Odesnik	7	7
(United States) V Spadea	5	6^{4}
ALT	(Sweden) F Prpic	7	6
WC	(United States) R Harrison	6^{3}	3
(Slovenia) L Gregorc	2	7	6
WC	(United States) R Williams	6	6^{5}	2
(United States) J Witten	3	6^{5}
8	(United States) R Sweeting	6	7
3	(United States) T Dent	6^{5}	6	6
(United States) S Jenkins	7	2	4
Q	(South Africa) R Klaasen	6^{6}	3
Q	(United Kingdom) J Baker	7	6
(South Africa) I van der Merwe	6	6
(India) P Amritraj	3	2
WC	(Hungary) D Lukács	2	2
7	(South Africa) K Anderson	6	6

Second round
1	(United States) W Odesnik	7	6
ALT	(Sweden) F Prpic	6^{1}	1
(Slovenia) L Gregorc	5	1
8	(United States) R Sweeting	7	6
3	(United States) T Dent	6	7
Q	(United Kingdom) J Baker	2	5
(South Africa) I van der Merwe	3	3
7	(South Africa) K Anderson	6	6

Quarterfinals
1	(United States) W Odesnik	3	4
8	(United States) R Sweeting	6	6
3	(United States) T Dent	6	7
7	(South Africa) K Anderson	3	5

Semifinals
8	(United States) R Sweeting	6^{3}	5
3	(United States) T Dent	7	7

=== Bottom half ===
First round
6	(India) S Devvarman	6^{8}	3
(Croatia) R Karanušić	7	6
Q	(United Kingdom) R Bloomfield	4	4
(Paraguay) R Delgado	6	6
(Serbia) I Bozoljac	6	6
ALT	(Bulgaria) G Dimitrov	4	4
WC	(Australia) K Hensel	6	7
4	(United States) K Kim	0	6^{2}
5	(United States) J Levine	3	4
(United States) D Young	6	6
(United States) A Kuznetsov	6	7
LL	(United States) M McClune	2	6^{2}
(United States) M Yani	1	1	r
(Slovenia) G Žemlja	6	4
Q	(Lithuania) R Berankis	1	7	6^{4}
2	(United States) M Russell	6	5	7

Second round
(Croatia) R Karanušić	1	0
(Paraguay) R Delgado	6	6
(Serbia) I Bozoljac	6	5	6
WC	(Australia) K Hensel	2	7	0
(United States) D Young	7	6
(United States) A Kuznetsov	6^{5}	3
(Slovenia) G Žemlja	6	7
2	(United States) M Russell	2	6^{4}

Quarterfinals
(Paraguay) R Delgado	4	6^{4}
(Serbia) I Bozoljac	6	7
(United States) D Young	4	3
(Slovenia) G Žemlja	6	6

Semifinals
(Serbia) I Bozoljac	6	6
(Slovenia) G Žemlja	3	4
