= 2009 Knoxville Challenger – Doubles =

Doubles
- 2009 Knoxville Challenger

Final
- Champions: (Germany) Martin Emmrich (Sweden) Andreas Siljeström
- Runners-up: (South Africa) Raven Klaasen (South Africa) Izak van der Merwe
- Score: 7–5, 6–4

Events
Singles	Doubles
← 2008 ·	Knoxville Challenger	· 2010 →

Kevin Anderson and G.D. Jones were the defending champions, but only Anderson tried to defend his title.
He partnered with Scott Lipsky. They were eliminated already in the first round by Raven Klaasen and Izak van der Merwe.
Martin Emmrich and Andreas Siljeström won this tournament, by defeating Klaasen and van der Merwe 7–5, 6–4 in the final.

== Seeds ==
1. (South Africa) Kevin Anderson / (United States) Scott Lipsky (first round)
2. (Philippines) Treat Conrad Huey / (India) Harsh Mankad (semifinals)
3. (Australia) Kaden Hensel / (Australia) Adam Hubble (quarterfinals)
4. (United States) Jesse Levine / (United States) Ryan Sweeting (quarterfinals)

== Draw ==
=== Key ===
- Q = Qualifier
- WC = Wild card
- LL = Lucky loser
- Alt = Alternate
- SE = Special exempt
- PR = Protected ranking
- ITF = ITF entry
- JE = Junior exempt
- w/o = Walkover
- r = Retired
- d = Defaulted
- SR = Special ranking

=== Draw ===
First round
1	(South Africa) K Anderson (United States) S Lipsky	2	7	[5]
(South Africa) R Klaasen (South Africa) I van der Merwe	6	6^{5}	[10]
(India) P Amritraj (United States) K Kim	2	3
WC	(United States) D Sandgren (Australia) J-P Smith	6	6
3	(Australia) K Hensel (Australia) A Hubble	6	6
(Croatia) R Karanušić (Slovenia) G Žemlja	1	3
WC	(United States) C Parr (United States) T Paul	4	6^{3}
(India) S Devvarman (India) P Raja	6	7
Q	(Spain) A Brugués-Davi (United States) B Joelson	0	2
(Germany) M Emmrich (Sweden) A Siljeström	6	6
(United States) N Monroe (United States) M Yani	2	3
4	(United States) J Levine (United States) R Sweeting	6	6
LL	(United States) B Battistone (United States) D Battistone	3	2
(Bulgaria) G Dimitrov (Sweden) F Prpic	6	6
WC	(United States) R Harrison (United States) R Rizza	6	2	[8]
2	(Philippines) TC Huey (India) H Mankad	2	6	[10]

Quarterfinals
(South Africa) R Klaasen (South Africa) I van der Merwe	6^{4}	6	[10]
WC	(United States) D Sandgren (Australia) J-P Smith	7	1	[4]
3	(Australia) K Hensel (Australia) A Hubble	3	1
(India) S Devvarman (India) P Raja	6	6
(Germany) M Emmrich (Sweden) A Siljeström	5	6	[10]
4	(United States) J Levine (United States) R Sweeting	7	4	[5]
(Bulgaria) G Dimitrov (Sweden) F Prpic	7	1	[4]
2	(Philippines) TC Huey (India) H Mankad	6^{5}	6	[10]

Semifinals
(South Africa) R Klaasen (South Africa) I van der Merwe	6	6
(India) S Devvarman (India) P Raja	2	3
(Germany) M Emmrich (Sweden) A Siljeström	6	7
2	(Philippines) TC Huey (India) H Mankad	3	6^{3}

Finals
(South Africa) R Klaasen (South Africa) I van der Merwe	5	4
(Germany) M Emmrich (Sweden) A Siljeström	7	6
