= 2011 Challenger Banque Nationale de Rimouski =

- Date: March 14 – March 20
- Edition: 5th
- Category: ATP Challenger Tour
- Prize money: US$35,000+H
- Surface: Hard (indoor)
- Location: Rimouski, Canada
- Venue: Tennis de Rimouski

Champions

Singles
- (South Africa) Fritz Wolmarans

Doubles
- (Philippines) Treat Conrad Huey / (Canada) Vasek Pospisil
← 2010 ·	Challenger de Rimouski	· 2012 →

The 2011 Challenger Banque Nationale de Rimouski was a professional tennis tournament played on indoor hard courts. It was the 5th edition of the tournament and part of the 2011 ATP Challenger Tour, offering a total of $35,000 in prize money. It took place in Rimouski, Canada between March 14 and March 20, 2011.

== Singles main-draw entrants ==
=== Seeds ===
Country	Player	Rank^{1}	Seed
USA	Bobby Reynolds	155	1
CAN	Peter Polansky	204	2
ITA	Matteo Viola	208	3
DEN	Frederik Nielsen	240	4
RSA	Fritz Wolmarans	254	5
ISR	Amir Weintraub	257	6
CAN	Philip Bester	259	7
AUS	Sam Groth	261	8

- ^{1} Rankings are as of March 7, 2011

=== Other entrants ===
The following players received wildcards into the singles main draw:

- (Canada) Daniel Chu
- (Canada) Ahmed El-Tabakh
- (Canada) Pavel Krainik
- (Canada) Robert Rotaru

The following players received entry from the qualifying draw:

- (United Kingdom) David Rice
- (Belgium) Julien Dubail
- (France) Albano Olivetti
- (United States) Blake Strode

== Champions ==
=== Singles ===
(South Africa) Fritz Wolmarans def. (United States) Bobby Reynolds, 6–7^{(2–7)}, 6–3, 7–6^{(7–3)}

=== Doubles ===
(Philippines) Treat Conrad Huey / (Canada) Vasek Pospisil def. (United Kingdom) David Rice / (United Kingdom) Sean Thornley, 6–0, 6–1
