= 2010 Challenger Banque Nationale de Rimouski – Doubles =

Doubles
- 2010 Challenger Banque Nationale de Rimouski

Final
- Champions: (Australia) Kaden Hensel (Australia) Adam Hubble
- Runners-up: (United States) Scott Lipsky (United States) David Martin
- Score: 7–6(5), 3–6, [11–9]

Events
Singles	Doubles
← 2008 ·	Challenger de Rimouski	· 2011 →

Kaden Hensel and Adam Hubble won in the final 7–6(5), 3–6, [11–9], against Scott Lipsky and David Martin.

== Seeds ==
1. (South Africa) Rik de Voest / (Netherlands) Rogier Wassen (semifinals)
2. (United States) Scott Lipsky / (United States) David Martin (finals)
3. (Australia) Kaden Hensel / (Australia) Adam Hubble (champions)
4. (India) Prakash Amritraj / (Austria) Martin Slanar (quarterfinals)

== Draw ==
=== Key ===
- Q = Qualifier
- WC = Wild card
- LL = Lucky loser
- Alt = Alternate
- SE = Special exempt
- PR = Protected ranking
- ITF = ITF entry
- JE = Junior exempt
- w/o = Walkover
- r = Retired
- d = Defaulted
- SR = Special ranking

=== Draw ===
First round
1	(South Africa) R de Voest (Netherlands) R Wassen	6	4	[10]
(Canada) P-L Duclos (Canada) P Polansky	4	6	[7]
(Canada) V Pospisil (Canada) M Raonic	w/o
(Spain) A Brugués-Davi (Australia) Nima Roshan
3	(Australia) K Hensel (Australia) A Hubble	6	6
WC	(Canada) P Bester (Canada) Kamil Pajkowski	2	2
(United States) B Evans (United States) A Kuznetsov	6	7
(Romania) C Gârd (Portugal) L Tavares	3	5
(Montenegro) D Danilović (Sweden) M Ryderstedt	4	6	[6]
ALT	(South Africa) A Anderson (Montenegro) G Tošić	6	3	[10]
ALT	(Australia) B Klein (Australia) J Millman	2	6	[9]
4	(India) P Amritraj (Austria) M Slanar	6	4	[11]
(United States) A Bogomolov Jr. (United States) N Monroe
(Australia) N Lindahl (Australia) M Matosevic	w/o
WC	(Israel) A Weintraub (Canada) Zachary White	4	6	[5]
2	(United States) S Lipsky (United States) D Martin	6	2	[10]

Quarterfinals
1	(South Africa) R de Voest (Netherlands) R Wassen	6	6
(Spain) A Brugués-Davi (Australia) N Roshan	4	3
3	(Australia) K Hensel (Australia) A Hubble	4	6	[10]
(United States) B Evans (United States) A Kuznetsov	6	2	[7]
ALT	(South Africa) A Anderson (Montenegro) G Tošić	6	1	[10]
4	(India) P Amritraj (Austria) M Slanar	2	6	[8]
(United States) A Bogomolov Jr. (United States) N Monroe	5	4
2	(United States) S Lipsky (United States) D Martin	7	6

Semifinals
1	(South Africa) R de Voest (Netherlands) R Wassen	6	5	[7]
3	(Australia) K Hensel (Australia) A Hubble	4	7	[10]
ALT	(South Africa) A Anderson (Montenegro) G Tošić	3	6^{5}
2	(United States) S Lipsky (United States) D Martin	6	7

Finals
3	(Australia) K Hensel (Australia) A Hubble	7	3	[11]
2	(United States) S Lipsky (United States) D Martin	6^{5}	6	[9]
