= 2009 SAT Khorat Open – Singles =

Singles
- 2009 SAT Khorat Open

Final
- Champion: (Germany) Andreas Beck
- Runner-up: (Sweden) Filip Prpic
- Score: 7–5, 6–3

Events
Singles	Doubles
SAT Khorat Open

Andreas Beck won in the singles' final of the first edition of these championships. He defeated qualifier Filip Prpic 7–5, 6–3.

== Seeds ==
1. (Germany) Andreas Beck (champion)
2. (Japan) Go Soeda (quarterfinals)
3. (Australia) Chris Guccione (second round)
4. (France) Mathieu Montcourt (second round)
5. (Russia) Michail Elgin (first round)
6. (Germany) Daniel Brands (first round)
7. (India) Somdev Devvarman (first round)
8. (Thailand) Danai Udomchoke (second round)

== Draw ==
=== Key ===
- Q = Qualifier
- WC = Wild card
- LL = Lucky loser
- Alt = Alternate
- SE = Special exempt
- PR = Protected ranking
- ITF = ITF entry
- JE = Junior exempt
- w/o = Walkover
- r = Retired
- d = Defaulted
- SR = Special ranking

=== Final four ===
Semifinals
1	(Germany) Andreas Beck	6	2	6
(United States) Rajeev Ram	2	6	4
Q	(Sweden) Filip Prpic	6	6
(Turkey) Marsel İlhan	1	4

Final
1	(Germany) Andreas Beck	7	6
Q	(Sweden) Filip Prpic	5	3

=== Top half ===
First round
1	(Germany) A Beck	7	7
(India) P Amritraj	5	6^{3}
(Israel) H Levy	6	1	6
WC	(Thailand) K Wachiramanowong	1	6	0
(Australia) C Ebelthite	1	r
(United Kingdom) J Goodall	4
(Italy) P Lorenzi	6	7
6	(Germany) D Brands	4	5
4	(France) M Montcourt	4	6	6
(Sweden) B Rehnquist	6	3	2
SE	(Israel) N Okun	6	6
Q	(Russia) E Donskoy	2	3
(France) É Roger-Vasselin	5	2
(United States) R Ram	7	6
(Russia) A Kudryavtsev	7	6
7	(India) S Devvarman	5	3

Second round
1	(Germany) A Beck	6	6
(Israel) H Levy	2	1
(United Kingdom) J Goodall	4	0
(Italy) P Lorenzi	6	6
4	(France) M Montcourt	3	6	5
SE	(Israel) N Okun	6	4	7
(United States) R Ram	7	6
(Russia) A Kudryavtsev	5	3

Quarterfinals
1	(Germany) A Beck	6	4	7
(Italy) P Lorenzi	3	6	6^{4}
SE	(Israel) N Okun	6	6^{5}	4
(United States) R Ram	4	7	6

Semifinals
1	(Germany) A Beck	6	2	6
(United States) R Ram	2	6	4

=== Bottom half ===
First round
8	(Thailand) D Udomchoke	6	6
Q	(Ukraine) D Molchanov	3	3
(South Africa) I van der Merwe	7	6
WC	(Bulgaria) G Dimitrov	5	2
Q	(Sweden) F Prpic	6	6
(Australia) J Sirianni	2	2
WC	(Thailand) So Ratiwatana	2	3
3	(Australia) C Guccione	6	6
5	(Russia) M Elgin	1	7	4
(Turkey) M İlhan	6	5	6
WC	(Thailand) P Siriluethaiwattana	1	1
(South Korea) KT Im	6	6
Q	(Chinese Taipei) T Chen	2	6^{5}
(Austria) M Slanar	6	7
(Germany) D Kindlmann	1	r
2	(Japan) G Soeda	3

Second round
8	(Thailand) D Udomchoke	6	4	5
(South Africa) I van der Merwe	2	6	7
Q	(Sweden) F Prpic	6	6
3	(Australia) C Guccione	4	4
(Turkey) M İlhan	6	7
(South Korea) KT Im	3	6^{4}
(Austria) M Slanar	1	r
2	(Japan) G Soeda	3

Quarterfinals
(South Africa) I van der Merwe	2	4
Q	(Sweden) F Prpic	6	6
(Turkey) M İlhan	7	4	7
2	(Japan) G Soeda	6^{5}	6	6^{6}

Semifinals
Q	(Sweden) F Prpic	6	6
(Turkey) M İlhan	1	4
