= 2010 American Express – TED Open – Doubles =

TED Open – Doubles
- 2010 American Express – TED Open

Final
- Champions: (Czech Republic) Leoš Friedl (Serbia) Dušan Vemić
- Runners-up: (United States) Brian Battistone (Sweden) Andreas Siljeström
- Score: 7–6(6), 7–6(3)

Events
Singles	Doubles
- American Express – TED Open

Frederico Gil and Filip Prpic were the defending champions. They chose not to compete this year.
Leoš Friedl and Dušan Vemić won the title, defeating Brian Battistone and Andreas Siljeström 7–6(6), 7–6(3) in the finals.

== Seeds ==
1. (Germany) Philipp Marx / (Slovakia) Igor Zelenay (first round)
2. (Czech Republic) Leoš Friedl / (Serbia) Dušan Vemić (champions)
3. (Poland) Tomasz Bednarek / (Czech Republic) David Škoch (first round)
4. (France) Marc Gicquel / (France) Nicolas Mahut (first round)

== Draw ==
Key

- Q = Qualifier
- WC = Wild card
- LL = Lucky loser
- Alt = Alternate
- ITF = ITF entry
- PR = Protected ranking
- SR = Special ranking
- SE = Special exempt
- JE = Junior exempt
- JR = Junior Accelerator Programme entrant
- CO = College Accelerator Programme entrant
- NG = Next Gen Accelerator Program entrant
- w/o = Walkover
- r = Retired
- d = Defaulted

=== Draw ===
First round
1	(Germany) P Marx (Slovakia) I Zelenay	6^{2}	6^{2}
(Kazakhstan) M Kukushkin (Romania) A Ungur	7	7
WC	(Switzerland) G Bastl (Turkey) B Yalçınkale	6	1	[10]
WC	(Turkey) H Akkoyun (Turkey) T Altuna	3	6	[2]
4	(France) M Gicquel (France) N Mahut	6^{2}	5
(United Kingdom) J Delgado (United Kingdom) J Marray	7	7
(United States) B Battistone (Sweden) A Siljeström	6	6
(Belgium) N Desein (Belgium) C Rochus	4	3
WC	(Spain) J Martí (Spain) D Muñoz-De La Nava	6^{0}	4
(Australia) S Groth (Germany) F Moser	7	6
(Jamaica) D Brown (Netherlands) R Wassen	6	6
3	(Poland) T Bednarek (Czech Republic) D Škoch	4	1
(Russia) K Kravchuk (Ukraine) I Sergeyev	6	2	[3]
(Croatia) I Dodig (Croatia) L Zovko	2	6	[10]
(Czech Republic) J Hernych (Czech Republic) D Lojda	6	5	[8]
2	(Czech Republic) L Friedl (Serbia) D Vemić	4	7	[10]

Quarterfinals
(Kazakhstan) M Kukushkin (Romania) A Ungur	6	6
WC	(Switzerland) G Bastl (Turkey) B Yalçınkale	0	1
(United Kingdom) J Delgado (United Kingdom) J Marray	3	4
(United States) B Battistone (Sweden) A Siljeström	6	6
(Australia) S Groth (Germany) F Moser	0	4
(Jamaica) D Brown (Netherlands) R Wassen	6	6
(Croatia) I Dodig (Croatia) L Zovko	6^{8}	3
2	(Czech Republic) L Friedl (Serbia) D Vemić	7	6

Semifinals
(Kazakhstan) M Kukushkin (Romania) A Ungur	6^{7}	3
(United States) B Battistone (Sweden) A Siljeström	7	6
(Jamaica) D Brown (Netherlands) R Wassen	6	2	[3]
2	(Czech Republic) L Friedl (Serbia) D Vemić	4	6	[10]

Finals
(United States) B Battistone (Sweden) A Siljeström	6^{6}	6^{3}
2	(Czech Republic) L Friedl (Serbia) D Vemić	7	7
