= 2010 Challenger Banque Nationale de Rimouski =

- Date: March 22 – March 28
- Edition: 4th
- Category: ATP Challenger Tour
- Prize money: US$35,000+H
- Surface: Hard (indoor)
- Location: Rimouski, Canada
- Venue: Tennis de Rimouski

Champions

Singles
- (South Africa) Rik de Voest

Doubles
- (Australia) Kaden Hensel / (Australia) Adam Hubble
← 2008 ·	Challenger de Rimouski	· 2011 →

The 2010 Challenger Banque Nationale de Rimouski was a professional tennis tournament played on indoor hard courts. It was the 4th edition of the tournament and part of the 2010 ATP Challenger Tour, offering a total of $35,000 in prize money. It took place in Rimouski, Canada between March 22 and March 28, 2010.

== Singles main-draw entrants ==
=== Seeds ===
Country	Player	Rank^{1}	Seed
POL	Michał Przysiężny	137	1
GER	Dieter Kindlmann	174	2
USA	Alex Kuznetsov	184	3
SUI	Michael Lammer	191	4
USA	Brendan Evans	198	5
KOR	Im Kyu-tae	202	6
FRA	Vincent Millot	208	7
USA	Lester Cook	215	8

- ^{1} Rankings are as of March 15, 2010

=== Other entrants ===
The following players received wildcards into the singles main draw:

- (Canada) Philip Bester
- (Canada) Érik Chvojka
- (Canada) Milos Raonic
- (Canada) Zachary White

The following players received entry from the qualifying draw:

- (Australia) Kaden Hensel
- (Australia) Brydan Klein
- (Finland) Juho Paukku
- (Israel) Amir Weintraub

== Champions ==
=== Singles ===
(South Africa) Rik de Voest def. (United States) Tim Smyczek, 6–0, 7–5

=== Doubles ===
(Australia) Kaden Hensel / (Australia) Adam Hubble def. (United States) Scott Lipsky / (United States) David Martin, 7–6^{(7–5)}, 3–6, [11–9]
