= 2009 American Express – TED Open – Singles =

TED Open – Singles
- 2009 American Express – TED Open

Final
- Champion: (Ukraine) Illya Marchenko
- Runner-up: (Germany) Florian Mayer
- Score: 6–4, 6–4

Events
Singles	Doubles
- American Express – TED Open

Frederico Gil was the defending champion, but he lost to Florian Mayer in the semifinal.
Illya Marchenko defeated Florian Mayer 6–4, 6–4 in the final.

== Seeds ==
1. (Portugal) Frederico Gil (semifinals)
2. (Slovakia) Karol Beck (semifinals)
3. (Croatia) Roko Karanušić (second round, withdrew due to left abdom injury)
4. (Germany) Florian Mayer (final)
5. (Germany) Daniel Brands (first round)
6. (Slovenia) Blaž Kavčič (first round)
7. (France) Nicolas Mahut (first round)
8. (Austria) Stefan Koubek (first round)

== Draw ==
Key

- Q = Qualifier
- WC = Wild card
- LL = Lucky loser
- Alt = Alternate
- ITF = ITF entry
- PR = Protected ranking
- SR = Special ranking
- SE = Special exempt
- JE = Junior exempt
- JR = Junior Accelerator Programme entrant
- CO = College Accelerator Programme entrant
- NG = Next Gen Accelerator Program entrant
- w/o = Walkover
- r = Retired
- d = Defaulted

=== Final four ===
Semifinals
1	(Portugal) Frederico Gil	1	5
4	(Germany) Florian Mayer	6	7
(Ukraine) Illya Marchenko	6	7
2	(Slovakia) Karol Beck	2	6^{5}

Final
4	(Germany) Florian Mayer	4	4
(Ukraine) Illya Marchenko	6	6

=== Top half ===
First round
1	(Portugal) F Gil	6	6
WC	(Turkey) KU Ateş	0	0
(France) A Sidorenko	6	6
WC	(Turkey) T Köylü	1	0
(Kazakhstan) M Kukushkin	6	6
(Poland) M Gawron	4	3
Q	(Denmark) F Nielsen	2	6	6
5	(Germany) D Brands	6	3	2
4	(Germany) F Mayer	6	6
(Germany) D Meffert	4	2
(Republic of Ireland) C Niland	6	3
(France) É Roger-Vasselin	4	3	r
Q	(France) L Walter	6	7
(Belgium) R Bemelmans	4	6^{4}
(Turkey) M İlhan	5	6	6
8	(Austria) S Koubek	7	2	1

Second round
1	(Portugal) F Gil	6	6
(France) A Sidorenko	2	4
(Kazakhstan) M Kukushkin	1	6	6
Q	(Denmark) F Nielsen	6	4	3
4	(Germany) F Mayer	6	2	6
(Republic of Ireland) C Niland	3	6	3
Q	(France) L Walter	3	3
(Turkey) M İlhan	6	6

Quarterfinals
1	(Portugal) F Gil	6	7
(Kazakhstan) M Kukushkin	3	5
4	(Germany) F Mayer	6	6
(Turkey) M İlhan	4	4

Semifinals
1	(Portugal) F Gil	1	5
4	(Germany) F Mayer	6	7

=== Bottom half ===
First round
6	(Slovenia) B Kavčič	2	4
(France) S Robert	6	6
Q	(Sweden) F Prpic	3	3
(Germany) M Bachinger	6	6
WC	(Turkey) H Akkoyun	1	3
(Ukraine) I Marchenko	6	6
(Slovenia) G Žemlja	2	6^{3}
3	(Croatia) R Karanušić	6	7
7	(France) N Mahut	6	6^{1}	6^{3}
WC	(Bulgaria) G Dimitrov	4	7	7
(Germany) B Dorsch	2	2
(Austria) M Fischer	6	6
(Australia) J Sirianni	6	6
Q	(Germany) S Rieschick	4	4
(Italy) R Ghedin	3	6	3
2	(Slovakia) K Beck	6	3	6

Second round
(France) S Robert	7	6
(Germany) M Bachinger	5	4
(Ukraine) I Marchenko
3	(Croatia) R Karanušić	w/o
WC	(Bulgaria) G Dimitrov	4	6^{4}
(Austria) M Fischer	6	7
(Australia) J Sirianni	2	3
2	(Slovakia) K Beck	6	6

Quarterfinals
(France) S Robert	4	6^{2}
(Ukraine) I Marchenko	6	7
(Austria) M Fischer	3	4
2	(Slovakia) K Beck	6	6

Semifinals
(Ukraine) I Marchenko	6	7
2	(Slovakia) K Beck	2	6^{5}
