= 2010 Virginia National Bank Men's Pro Championship – Doubles =

Doubles
- 2010 Virginia National Bank Men's Pro Championship

Final
- Champions: (United States) Robert Kendrick (United States) Donald Young
- Runners-up: (United States) Ryler DeHeart (Canada) Pierre-Ludovic Duclos
- Score: 7–6(5), 7–6(3)

Events
Singles	Doubles
← 2009 ·	Virginia National Bank Men's Pro Championship	· 2011 →

Martin Emmrich and Andreas Siljeström were the defending champions but decided not to participate.
Robert Kendrick and Donald Young won this event, by defeating 4th seeds Ryler DeHeart and Pierre-Ludovic Duclos 7–6(5), 7–6(3) in the final.

== Seeds ==
1. (Australia) Carsten Ball / (United States) Travis Rettenmaier (first round)
2. (Australia) Stephen Huss / (Australia) Peter Luczak (first round)
3. (South Africa) Rik de Voest / (South Africa) Izak van der Merwe (quarterfinals)
4. (United States) Ryler DeHeart / (Canada) Pierre-Ludovic Duclos (final)

== Draw ==
=== Key ===
- Q = Qualifier
- WC = Wild card
- LL = Lucky loser
- Alt = Alternate
- SE = Special exempt
- PR = Protected ranking
- ITF = ITF entry
- JE = Junior exempt
- w/o = Walkover
- r = Retired
- d = Defaulted
- SR = Special ranking

=== Draw ===
First round
1	(Australia) C Ball (United States) T Rettenmaier	4	7	[3]
WC	(United States) B Joelson (United States) N Monroe	6	6^{1}	[10]
(United States) K Kim (Australia) M Matosevic	4	5
(United States) D Martin (United States) T Parrott	6	7
4	(United States) R DeHeart (Canada) P-L Duclos	6	6
(United States) B Reynolds (United States) T Smyczek	2	4
WC	(United States) J Levine (United States) R Sweeting	7	6
(Australia) K Hensel (Australia) A Hubble	5	4
(United States) L Cook (United States) R Harrison	6^{4}	3
(United States) R Kendrick (United States) D Young	7	6
(Australia) C Guccione (Australia) G Jones	2	3
3	(South Africa) R de Voest (South Africa) I van der Merwe	6	6
WC	(United States) A Bogomolov Jr. (United States) A Kuznetsov	3	5
(India) S Devvarman (Philippines) TC Huey	6	7
Q	(South Africa) A Anderson (United Kingdom) C Eaton	7	6
2	(Australia) S Huss (Australia) P Luczak	6^{4}	3

Quarterfinals
WC	(United States) B Joelson (United States) N Monroe	6	6
(United States) D Martin (United States) T Parrott	2	2
4	(United States) R DeHeart (Canada) P-L Duclos	7	4	[10]
WC	(United States) J Levine (United States) R Sweeting	6^{4}	6	[6]
(United States) R Kendrick (United States) D Young	6	4	[10]
3	(South Africa) R de Voest (South Africa) I van der Merwe	4	6	[6]
(India) S Devvarman (Philippines) TC Huey	7	4	[12]
Q	(South Africa) A Anderson (United Kingdom) C Eaton	6^{4}	6	[10]

Semifinals
WC	(United States) B Joelson (United States) N Monroe	4	6	[6]
4	(United States) R DeHeart (Canada) P-L Duclos	6	4	[10]
(United States) R Kendrick (United States) D Young	6	6^{5}	[11]
(India) S Devvarman (Philippines) TC Huey	3	7	[9]

Final
4	(United States) R DeHeart (Canada) P-L Duclos	6^{5}	6^{3}
(United States) R Kendrick (United States) D Young	7	7
