= 2009 American Express – TED Open – Doubles =

TED Open – Doubles
- 2009 American Express – TED Open

Final
- Champions: (Portugal) Frederico Gil (Sweden) Filip Prpic
- Runners-up: (Bulgaria) Grigor Dimitrov (Turkey) Marsel İlhan
- Score: 3–6, 6–2, [10–6]

Events
| Singles | Doubles |
| ← 2008 · | American Express – TED Open | · 2010 → |

Frederico Gil and Filip Prpic became the new champions, after defeating Grigor Dimitrov and Marsel İlhan 3–6, 6–2, [10–6] in the final.

== Seeds ==
1. (Germany) Michael Kohlmann / (Netherlands) Rogier Wassen (first round)
2. (United Kingdom) James Auckland / (United Kingdom) Jonathan Marray (first round)
3. (Denmark) Frederik Nielsen / (Australia) Joseph Sirianni (quarterfinals)
4. (Germany) Frank Moser / (Germany) Sebastian Rieschick (first round)

== Draw ==
=== Key ===
- Q = Qualifier
- WC = Wild card
- LL = Lucky loser
- Alt = Alternate
- SE = Special exempt
- PR = Protected ranking
- ITF = ITF entry
- JE = Junior exempt
- w/o = Walkover
- r = Retired
- d = Defaulted
- SR = Special ranking

=== Draw ===
First round
1 | (Germany) M Kohlmann (Netherlands) R Wassen | 7 | 4 | [7]
(Slovakia) K Beck (Czech Republic) J Krkoška | 6^{5} | 6 | [10]
WC | (Turkey) H Akkoyun (Turkey) B Ergün | 2 | 1
WC | (Bulgaria) G Dimitrov (Turkey) M İlhan | 6 | 6
4 | (Germany) F Moser (Germany) S Rieschick | 2 | 2
(France) N Mahut (France) É Roger-Vasselin | 6 | 6
(Germany) B Dorsch (Germany) D Meffert
WC | (Turkey) K U Ateş (Turkey) B Yalçınkale | w/o
(Portugal) F Gil (Sweden) F Prpic | 6 | 6
(Kazakhstan) M Kukushkin (Ukraine) I Marchenko | 3 | 3
(Belgium) R Bemelmans (Italy) R Ghedin | 4 | 6 | [10]
3 | (Denmark) F Nielsen (Australia) J Sirianni | 6 | 4 | [12]
(Croatia) R Karanušić (Republic of Ireland) C Niland | 6 | 7
(Slovenia) B Kavčič (Slovenia) G Žemlja | 4 | 5
(France) S Robert (France) A Sidorenko | 7 | 6
2 | (United Kingdom) J Auckland (United Kingdom) J Marray | 6^{3} | 3

Quarterfinals
(Slovakia) K Beck (Czech Republic) J Krkoška | 6^{8} | 6 | [6]
WC | (Bulgaria) G Dimitrov (Turkey) M İlhan | 7 | 2 | [10]
(France) N Mahut (France) É Roger-Vasselin | 6 | 6
(Germany) B Dorsch (Germany) D Meffert | 1 | 4
(Portugal) F Gil (Sweden) F Prpic | 6 | 3 | [10]
3 | (Denmark) F Nielsen (Australia) J Sirianni | 3 | 6 | [7]
(Croatia) R Karanušić (Republic of Ireland) C Niland | w/o
(France) S Robert (France) A Sidorenko

Semifinals
WC | (Bulgaria) G Dimitrov (Turkey) M İlhan | 4 | 6 | [10]
(France) N Mahut (France) É Roger-Vasselin | 6 | 3 | [5]
(Portugal) F Gil (Sweden) F Prpic | 7 | 7
(France) S Robert (France) A Sidorenko | 6^{1} | 5

Finals
WC | (Bulgaria) G Dimitrov (Turkey) M İlhan | 6 | 2 | [6]
(Portugal) F Gil (Sweden) F Prpic | 3 | 6 | [10]
