= 2009 Knoxville Challenger =

- Date: 9–15 November
- Edition: 6th
- Surface: Hard
- Location: Knoxville, United States

Champions

Singles
- (United States) Taylor Dent

Doubles
- (Germany) Martin Emmrich / (Sweden) Andreas Siljeström
← 2008 ·	Knoxville Challenger	· 2010 →

The 2009 Knoxville Challenger was a professional tennis tournament played on indoor hard courts. It was the sixth edition of the tournament which was part of the 2009 ATP Challenger Tour. It took place in Knoxville, United States between 9 and 15 November 2009.

== Singles main-draw entrants ==
=== Seeds ===
Country	Player	Rank^{1}	Seed
USA	Wayne Odesnik	83	1
USA	Michael Russell	86	2
USA	Taylor Dent	104	3
USA	Kevin Kim	105	4
USA	Jesse Levine	109	5
IND	Somdev Devvarman	116	6
RSA	Kevin Anderson	120	7
USA	Ryan Sweeting	147	8

- Rankings are as of November 2, 2009.

=== Other entrants ===
The following players received wildcards into the singles main draw:

- (United States) Ryan Harrison
- (Australia) Kaden Hensel
- (Hungary) Dénes Lukács
- (United States) Rhyne Williams

The following players received entry from the qualifying draw:

- (United Kingdom) Jamie Baker
- (Lithuania) Ričardas Berankis
- (United Kingdom) Richard Bloomfield
- (South Africa) Raven Klaasen
- (United States) Michael McClune (LL)

== Champions ==
=== Singles ===
(United States) Taylor Dent def. (Serbia) Ilija Bozoljac, 6–3, 7–6(6)

=== Doubles ===
(Germany) Martin Emmrich / (Sweden) Andreas Siljeström def. (South Africa) Raven Klaasen / (South Africa) Izak van der Merwe, 7–5, 6–4
