= 2011 Challenger Banque Nationale de Rimouski – Singles =

Singles
- 2011 Challenger Banque Nationale de Rimouski

Final
- Champion: (South Africa) Fritz Wolmarans
- Runner-up: (United States) Bobby Reynolds
- Score: 6–7(2), 6–3, 7–6(3)

Events
Singles	Doubles
← 2010 ·	Challenger de Rimouski	· 2012 →

Rik de Voest was the defending champion but decided not to participate.
Fritz Wolmarans won the final against Bobby Reynolds 6–7(2), 6–3, 7–6(3).

== Seeds ==
1. (United States) Bobby Reynolds (final)
2. (Canada) Peter Polansky (second round)
3. (Italy) Matteo Viola (quarterfinals)
4. (Denmark) Frederik Nielsen (semifinals)
5. (South Africa) Fritz Wolmarans (champion)
6. (Israel) Amir Weintraub (quarterfinals)
7. (Canada) Philip Bester (second round)
8. (Australia) Sam Groth (first round)

== Draw ==
=== Key ===
- Q = Qualifier
- WC = Wild card
- LL = Lucky loser
- Alt = Alternate
- ITF = ITF entry
- PR = Protected ranking
- SR = Special ranking
- SE = Special exempt
- JE = Junior exempt
- JR = Junior Accelerator Programme entrant
- CO = College Accelerator Programme entrant
- NG = Next Gen Accelerator Program entrant
- w/o = Walkover
- r = Retired
- d = Defaulted

=== Final four ===
Semifinals
1	(United States) Bobby Reynolds	6	7
4	(Denmark) Frederik Nielsen	4	6^{5}
(Canada) Vasek Pospisil	2	2
5	(South Africa) Fritz Wolmarans	6	6

Final
1	(United States) Bobby Reynolds	7	3	6^{3}
5	(South Africa) Fritz Wolmarans	6^{2}	6	7

=== Top half ===
First round
1	(United States) B Reynolds	7	7
Q	(France) A Olivetti	6^{9}	6^{5}
(Australia) M Reid	1	2
(France) L Walter	6	6
(United States) J Levine	6^{7}	5
(United States) A El Mihdawy	7	7
WC	(Canada) Daniel Chu	4	4
6	(Israel) A Weintraub	6	6
4	(Denmark) F Nielsen	6	6
(Slovenia) L Gregorc	2	2
(United States) N Monroe	3	6^{3}
(United States) M McClune	6	7
(United States) Greg Ouellette	3	7	6
WC	(Canada) Pavel Krainik	6	6^{1}	2
(New Zealand) A Sitak	4	3
7	(Canada) P Bester	6	6

Second round
1	(United States) B Reynolds	6	6
(France) L Walter	3	4
(United States) A El Mihdawy	3	5
6	(Israel) A Weintraub	6	7
4	(Denmark) F Nielsen	6	6
(United States) M McClune	1	2
(United States) Greg Ouellette	6^{4}	7	6
7	(Canada) P Bester	7	6^{8}	4

Quarterfinals
1	(United States) B Reynolds	3	6	6
6	(Israel) A Weintraub	6	3	4
4	(Denmark) F Nielsen	6	7
(United States) Greg Ouellette	1	6^{3}

Semifinals
1	(United States) B Reynolds	6	7
4	(Denmark) F Nielsen	4	6^{5}

=== Bottom half ===
First round
8	(Australia) S Groth	4	4
(Canada) V Pospisil	6	6
(France) Charles-Antoine Brézac	6	6
WC	(Canada) Robert Rotaru	2	2
(United States) J Cox	6	6
(Italy) M Marrai	4	4
WC	(Canada) Ahmed El-Tabakh	2	1^{r}
3	(Italy) M Viola	6	5
5	(South Africa) F Wolmarans	6	7
(Switzerland) A Bossel	2	5
Q	(Belgium) Julien Dubail	7	6
Q	(United States) B Strode	5	4
(United States) K Kim	6	7
(Moldova) R Borvanov	4	6^{2}
Q	(United Kingdom) D Rice	3	1
2	(Canada) P Polansky	6	6

Second round
(Canada) V Pospisil	6	6
(France) Charles-Antoine Brézac	3	2
(United States) J Cox	1	4
3	(Italy) M Viola	6	6
5	(South Africa) F Wolmarans	6	6
Q	(Belgium) Julien Dubail	4	4
(United States) K Kim	6	4	6
2	(Canada) P Polansky	3	6	2

Quarterfinals
(Canada) V Pospisil	6	6
3	(Italy) M Viola	4	4
5	(South Africa) F Wolmarans	6	6
(United States) K Kim	1	2

Semifinals
(Canada) V Pospisil	2	2
5	(South Africa) F Wolmarans	6	6
