= 2009 SAT Khorat Open – Doubles =

Doubles
- 2009 SAT Khorat Open

Final
- Champions: (India) Rohan Bopanna (Pakistan) Aisam-ul-Haq Qureshi
- Runners-up: (Thailand) Sanchai Ratiwatana (Thailand) Sonchat Ratiwatana
- Score: 6–3, 6–7(5), [10–5]

Events
Singles	Doubles
SAT Khorat Open

Rohan Bopanna and Aisam-ul-Haq Qureshi won in the doubles' final of the first edition of these championships. They defeated Thais: Sanchai Ratiwatana and Sonchat Ratiwatana in three sets (6–3, 6–7(5), [10–5]).

== Seeds ==
1. (India) Rohan Bopanna / (Pakistan) Aisam-ul-Haq Qureshi (champions)
2. none
3. (Russia) Michail Elgin / (Russia) Alexandre Kudryavtsev (first round)
4. (Thailand) Sanchai Ratiwatana / (Thailand) Sonchat Ratiwatana (final)

== Draw ==
Key

- Q = Qualifier
- WC = Wild card
- LL = Lucky loser
- Alt = Alternate
- ITF = ITF entry
- PR = Protected ranking
- SR = Special ranking
- SE = Special exempt
- JE = Junior exempt
- JR = Junior Accelerator Programme entrant
- CO = College Accelerator Programme entrant
- NG = Next Gen Accelerator Program entrant
- w/o = Walkover
- r = Retired
- d = Defaulted

=== Draw ===
First round
1	(India) R Bopanna (Pakistan) A-u-H Qureshi	6	6
WC	(Thailand) Pongsatorn Benjamas (Thailand) Prach Mahathavorn	4	1
(India) P Raja (India) A Singh	6	6
(France) M Montcourt (France) É Roger-Vasselin	3	3
3	(Russia) M Elgin (Russia) A Kudryavtsev	5	3
(South Korea) KT Im (Thailand) D Udomchoke	7	6
(Israel) H Levy (Israel) N Okun	6	6
ALT	(Chinese Taipei) T Chen (Austria) M Slanar	2	2
WC	(Bulgaria) G Dimitrov (Thailand) K Wachiramanowong	6	7
(Australia) C Guccione (Brazil) M Torres	3	6^{7}
(United Kingdom) J Goodall (Australia) J Sirianni	w/o
4	(Thailand) Sa Ratiwatana (Thailand) So Ratiwatana
(India) S Devvarman (South Africa) I van der Merwe	6	6
WC	(United Kingdom) Faris Akhazzan (Thailand) P Siriluethaiwattana	0	3
(Italy) P Lorenzi (Sweden) B Rehnquist	w/o
ALT	(Russia) E Donskoy (Russia) D Sitak

Quarterfinals
1	(India) R Bopanna (Pakistan) A-u-H Qureshi	4	6	[13]
(India) P Raja (India) A Singh	6	3	[11]
(South Korea) KT Im (Thailand) D Udomchoke	2	3
(Israel) H Levy (Israel) N Okun	6	6
WC	(Bulgaria) G Dimitrov (Thailand) K Wachiramanowong	6	2	r
4	(Thailand) Sa Ratiwatana (Thailand) So Ratiwatana	4	2
(India) S Devvarman (South Africa) I van der Merwe	4	3
ALT	(Russia) E Donskoy (Russia) D Sitak	6	6

Semifinals
1	(India) R Bopanna (Pakistan) A-u-H Qureshi	7	3	[10]
(Israel) H Levy (Israel) N Okun	6^{5}	6	[6]
4	(Thailand) Sa Ratiwatana (Thailand) So Ratiwatana	6	6
ALT	(Russia) E Donskoy (Russia) D Sitak	4	4

Finals
1	(India) R Bopanna (Pakistan) A-u-H Qureshi	6	6^{5}	[10]
4	(Thailand) Sa Ratiwatana (Thailand) So Ratiwatana	3	7	[5]
