= 2010 Challenger Banque Nationale de Rimouski – Singles =

Singles
- 2010 Challenger Banque Nationale de Rimouski

Final
- Champion: (South Africa) Rik de Voest
- Runner-up: (United States) Tim Smyczek
- Score: 6–0, 7–5

Events
Singles	Doubles
← 2008 ·	Challenger de Rimouski	· 2011 →

Rik de Voest won in the final 6–0, 7–5, against Tim Smyczek.

== Seeds ==
1. (Poland) Michał Przysiężny (semifinals)
2. (Germany) Dieter Kindlmann (first round)
3. (United States) Alex Kuznetsov (first round)
4. (Switzerland) Michael Lammer (first round)
5. (United States) Brendan Evans (first round)
6. (South Korea) Im Kyu Tae (first round)
7. (France) Vincent Millot (first round)
8. (United States) Lester Cook (quarterfinals)

== Draw ==
=== Key ===
- Q = Qualifier
- WC = Wild card
- LL = Lucky loser
- Alt = Alternate
- SE = Special exempt
- PR = Protected ranking
- ITF = ITF entry
- JE = Junior exempt
- w/o = Walkover
- r = Retired
- d = Defaulted
- SR = Special ranking

=== Finals ===
Semifinals
1	(Poland) Michał Przysiężny	4	1
(South Africa) Rik de Voest	6	6
(United States) Tim Smyczek	7	6
WC	(Canada) Erik Chvojka	6^{3}	0

Final
(South Africa) Rik de Voest	6	7
(United States) Tim Smyczek	0	5

=== Top half ===
First round
1	(Poland) M Przysiężny	6	0	7
(United States) A Bogomolov Jr.	4	6	6^{6}
(Montenegro) G Tošić	6	2	6
Q	(Australia) K Hensel	4	6	4
WC	(Canada) M Raonic	6	6^{9}	2
(Australia) M Matosevic	2	7	6
Q	(Australia) B Klein	6	3	4
8	(United States) L Cook	3	6	6
3	(United States) A Kuznetsov	2	2
(India) P Amritraj	6	6
Q	(Israel) A Weintraub	6^{3}	6	6
WC	(Canada) P Bester	7	3	2
(Germany) M Bachinger	2	3
(South Africa) R de Voest	6	6
(Spain) A Brugués-Davi	6	7
7	(France) V Millot	3	6^{4}

Second round
1	(Poland) M Przysiężny	6	3	7
(Montenegro) G Tošić	3	6	6^{5}
(Australia) M Matosevic	6^{3}	3
8	(United States) L Cook	7	6
(India) P Amritraj	6	3	6
Q	(Israel) A Weintraub	3	6	4
(South Africa) R de Voest	7	6
(Spain) A Brugués-Davi	6^{5}	3

Quarterfinals
1	(Poland) M Przysiężny	6	6
8	(United States) L Cook	2	4
(India) P Amritraj	1	3
(South Africa) R de Voest	6	6

Semifinals
1	(Poland) M Przysiężny	4	1
(South Africa) R de Voest	6	6

=== Bottom half ===
First round
5	(United States) B Evans	4	4
(Canada) P Polansky	6	6
(United States) T Smyczek	6	6
Q	(Finland) J Paukku	2	4
WC	(Canada) Zachary White	4	2
(Canada) P-L Duclos	6	6
(Austria) M Slanar	3	7	6
4	(Switzerland) M Lammer	6	5	4
6	(South Korea) KT Im	2	1	r
(Romania) C Gârd	6	4
(Canada) V Pospisil	6	5	3
(Australia) N Lindahl	1	7	6
WC	(Canada) E Chvojka	2	7	6
(Australia) J Millman	6	5	2
(Portugal) L Tavares	6	6
2	(Germany) D Kindlmann	4	4

Second round
(Canada) P Polansky	4	2
(United States) T Smyczek	6	6
(Canada) P-L Duclos	3	6^{5}
(Austria) M Slanar	6	7
(Romania) C Gârd	4	4
(Australia) N Lindahl	6	6
WC	(Canada) E Chvojka	7	6
(Portugal) L Tavares	5	3

Quarterfinals
(United States) T Smyczek	7	6
(Austria) M Slanar	5	0
(Australia) N Lindahl	3	4
WC	(Canada) E Chvojka	6	6

Semifinals
(United States) T Smyczek	7	6
WC	(Canada) E Chvojka	6^{3}	0
