= 2009 American Express – TED Open =

- Date: August 10 – August 16
- Edition: 23rd
- Location: Istanbul, Turkey

Champions

Singles
- (Ukraine) Illya Marchenko

Doubles
- (Portugal) Frederico Gil / (Sweden) Filip Prpic
← 2008 ·	American Express – TED Open	· 2010 →

The 2009 American Express – TED open was a professional tennis tournament played on outdoor hard courts. It was part of the 2009 ATP Challenger Tour. It took place in Istanbul, Turkey between 10 and 16 August 2009.

== Singles entrants ==
=== Seeds ===
Nationality	Player	Ranking*	Seeding
POR	Frederico Gil	88	1
SVK	Karol Beck	100	2
CRO	Roko Karanušić	119	3
GER	Florian Mayer	130	4
GER	Daniel Brands	131	5
SLO	Blaž Kavčič	132	6
FRA	Nicolas Mahut	135	7
AUT	Stefan Koubek	148	8

- Rankings are as of August 3, 2009.

=== Other entrants ===
The following players received wildcards into the singles main draw:

- (Turkey) Haluk Akkoyun
- (Bulgaria) Grigor Dimitrov
- (Turkey) Korhan Ural Ateş
- (Turkey) Tugay Köylü

The following players received entry from the qualifying draw:

- (Denmark) Frederik Nielsen
- (Sweden) Filip Prpic
- (Germany) Sebastian Rieschick
- (France) Ludovic Walter

== Champions ==
=== Singles ===
(Ukraine) Illya Marchenko def. (Germany) Florian Mayer, 6–4, 6–4

=== Doubles ===
(Portugal) Frederico Gil / (Sweden) Filip Prpic def. (Bulgaria) Grigor Dimitrov / (Turkey) Marsel İlhan, 3–6, 6–2, [10–6]
