= 2010 American Express – TED Open – Singles =

TED Open – Singles
- 2010 American Express – TED Open

Final
- Champion: (France) Adrian Mannarino
- Runner-up: (Kazakhstan) Mikhail Kukushkin
- Score: 6–4, 3–6, 6–3

Events
Singles	Doubles
- American Express – TED Open

Following are the results of the Singles events of the 2010 American Express – TED open. The professional tennis tournament played on outdoor hard courts. It was the twenty-fourth edition of the tournament which is part of the 2010 ATP Challenger Tour. It took place in Istanbul, Turkey between 9 and 15 August 2010.

Illya Marchenko was the defending champion but decided not to participate this year. Adrian Mannarino won the title, defeating Mikhail Kukushkin 6–4, 3–6, 6–3 in the final.

== Seeds ==
1. (Belgium) Olivier Rochus (first round)
2. (Portugal) Frederico Gil (semifinals)
3. (Kazakhstan) Mikhail Kukushkin (final)
4. (Jamaica) Dustin Brown (second round)
5. (Turkey) Marsel İlhan (second round)
6. (Romania) Adrian Ungur (quarterfinals)
7. (Russia) Igor Kunitsyn (semifinals)
8. (Austria) Martin Fischer (quarterfinals)

== Draw ==
Key

- Q = Qualifier
- WC = Wild card
- LL = Lucky loser
- Alt = Alternate
- ITF = ITF entry
- PR = Protected ranking
- SR = Special ranking
- SE = Special exempt
- JE = Junior exempt
- JR = Junior Accelerator Programme entrant
- CO = College Accelerator Programme entrant
- NG = Next Gen Accelerator Program entrant
- w/o = Walkover
- r = Retired
- d = Defaulted

=== Finals ===
Semifinals
(France) Adrian Mannarino	6	6
7	(Russia) Igor Kunitsyn	4	4
3	(Kazakhstan) Mikhail Kukushkin	7	6
2	(Portugal) Frederico Gil	5	4

Final
(France) Adrian Mannarino	6	3	6
3	(Kazakhstan) Mikhail Kukushkin	4	6	3

=== Top half ===
First round
1	(Belgium) O Rochus	5	6	5
(Spain) D Muñoz de la Nava	7	2	7
(France) A Mannarino	7	6
WC	(Turkey) T Altuna	6^{2}	1
WC	(Turkey) H Akkoyun	7	1
(Belgium) N Desein	5	0	r
SE	(France) L Recouderc	4	4
6	(Romania) A Ungur	6	6
4	(Jamaica) D Brown	6	6^{3}	7
WC	(Switzerland) G Bastl	4	7	6^{9}
Q	(Portugal) J Sousa	7	6
(Germany) M Zverev	6^{3}	3
(Croatia) I Dodig	6	4
(France) N Mahut	4	1	r
Q	(Uzbekistan) A Asanov	0	1
7	(Russia) I Kunitsyn	6	6

Second round
(Spain) D Muñoz de la Nava	4	2
(France) A Mannarino	6	6
WC	(Turkey) H Akkoyun	6	1	6^{5}
6	(Romania) A Ungur	3	6	7
4	(Jamaica) D Brown	4	4
Q	(Portugal) J Sousa	6	6
(Croatia) I Dodig	5	2
7	(Russia) I Kunitsyn	7	6

Quarterfinals
(France) A Mannarino	6	7
6	(Romania) A Ungur	4	5
Q	(Portugal) J Sousa	6	0	3
7	(Russia) I Kunitsyn	4	6	6

Semifinals
(France) A Mannarino	6	6
7	(Russia) I Kunitsyn	4	4

=== Bottom half ===
First round
5/WC	(Turkey) M İlhan	6	7
Q	(Spain) J Martí	4	6
(Spain) R Bautista Agut	3	6	1^{r}
(Russia) K Kravchuk	6	4	3
(Germany) D Gremelmayr	6	7
(Czech Republic) D Lojda	2	6^{1}
(Czech Republic) J Hernych	4	3
3	(Kazakhstan) M Kukushkin	6	6
8	(Austria) M Fischer	6	6
(Belgium) C Rochus	1	2
(Ukraine) I Sergeyev	4	4
SE	(France) V Millot	6	6
(France) M Gicquel	5	4
(Switzerland) S Bohli	7	6
Q	(Sweden) F Prpic	4	4
2	(Portugal) F Gil	6	6

Second round
5/WC	(Turkey) M İlhan	3	7	0
(Russia) K Kravchuk	6	6^{3}	6
(Germany) D Gremelmayr	3	1
3	(Kazakhstan) M Kukushkin	6	6
8	(Austria) M Fischer	7	6
SE	(France) V Millot	6	4
(Switzerland) S Bohli	6	2	2
2	(Portugal) F Gil	4	6	6

Quarterfinals
(Russia) K Kravchuk	2	2
3	(Kazakhstan) M Kukushkin	6	6
8	(Austria) M Fischer	4	6^{9}
2	(Portugal) F Gil	6	7

Semifinals
3	(Kazakhstan) M Kukushkin	7	6
2	(Portugal) F Gil	5	4
