= 2009 Virginia National Bank Men's Pro Championship – Singles =

Singles
- 2009 Virginia National Bank Men's Pro Championship

Final
- Champion: (United States) Kevin Kim
- Runner-up: (India) Somdev Devvarman
- Score: 6–4, 6–7^{(8–10)}, 6–4

Events
| Singles | Doubles |
| ← 2008 · | Virginia National Bank Men's Pro Championship | · 2010 → |

Kevin Kim defeated Somdev Devvarman 6–4, 6–7^{(8–10)}, 6–4 in the final.

== Seeds ==
1. (United States) Michael Russell (quarterfinals)
2. (United States) Kevin Kim (champion)
3. (India) Somdev Devvarman (final)
4. (South Africa) Kevin Anderson (second round)
5. (United States) Ryan Sweeting (semifinals)
6. (Slovenia) Grega Žemlja (first round)
7. (Croatia) Roko Karanušić (second round)
8. (United States) Jesse Witten (first round)

== Draw ==
=== Key ===
- Q = Qualifier
- WC = Wild card
- LL = Lucky loser
- Alt = Alternate
- SE = Special exempt
- PR = Protected ranking
- ITF = ITF entry
- JE = Junior exempt
- w/o = Walkover
- r = Retired
- d = Defaulted
- SR = Special ranking

=== Finals ===
Semifinals
5 | (United States) Ryan Sweeting | 4 | 6 | 2
3 | (India) Somdev Devvarman | 6 | 3 | 6
(United States) Donald Young | 2 | 5
2 | (United States) Kevin Kim | 6 | 7

Final
3 | (India) Somdev Devvarman | 4 | 7 | 4
2 | (United States) Kevin Kim | 6 | 6^{8} | 6

=== Top half ===
First round
1 | (United States) M Russell | 3 | 6 | 6
(United States) M McClune | 6 | 2 | 1
(Bulgaria) G Dimitrov | 7 | 1 | 7
(United States) M Yani | 5 | 6 | 6^{3}
WC | (Philippines) TC Huey | 6^{5} | 4
(Sweden) F Prpic | 7 | 6
(Sweden) B Rehnquist | 1 | 6 | 3
5 | (United States) R Sweeting | 6 | 3 | 6
3 | (India) S Devvarman | 6 | 2 | 7
WC | (Hungary) D Lukács | 3 | 6 | 5
(South Africa) I van der Merwe | 6 | 6
(South Africa) R Klaasen | 4 | 4
(United States) R Harrison | 6 | 7
Q | (United States) T Paul | 4 | 6^{3}
(Netherlands) M Middelkoop | 6 | 6
8 | (United States) J Witten | 3 | 4

Second round
1 | (United States) M Russell | 4 | 6 | 6
(Bulgaria) G Dimitrov | 6 | 4 | 2
(Sweden) F Prpic | 6 | 1 | 0
5 | (United States) R Sweeting | 3 | 6 | 6
3 | (India) S Devvarman | 6 | 1 | 6
(South Africa) I van der Merwe | 2 | 6 | 2
(United States) R Harrison | 6 | 3 | 2
(Netherlands) M Middelkoop | 1 | 6 | 6

Quarterfinals
1 | (United States) M Russell | 2 | 6 | 6^{1}
5 | (United States) R Sweeting | 6 | 3 | 7
3 | (India) S Devvarman | 6 | 6
(Netherlands) M Middelkoop | 3 | 4

Semifinals
5 | (United States) R Sweeting | 4 | 6 | 2
3 | (India) S Devvarman | 6 | 3 | 6

=== Bottom half ===
First round
7 | (Croatia) R Karanušić | 6 | 6
(Latvia) D Pavlovs | 1 | 1
(Serbia) I Bozoljac | 6 | 2 | 1
WC | (United Kingdom) D Inglot | 4 | 6 | 6
(United States) V Spadea | 3 | 6 | 1
(United States) D Young | 6 | 2 | 6
(United States) A Bogomolov Jr. | 0 | 2
4 | (South Africa) K Anderson | 6 | 6
6 | (Slovenia) G Žemlja | 2 | 7 | 4
Q | (India) S Singh | 6 | 5 | 6
(United States) S Jenkins | 6 | 5 | 6
Q | (United States) C Parr | 3 | 7 | 1
(Slovenia) L Gregorc | 3 | 4
(Paraguay) R Delgado | 6 | 6
Q | (South Africa) F Wolmarans | 4 | 6^{7}
2 | (United States) K Kim | 6 | 7

Second round
7 | (Croatia) R Karanušić | 5 | 6 | 0
WC | (United Kingdom) D Inglot | 7 | 4 | 6
(United States) D Young | 6 | 3 | 7
4 | (South Africa) K Anderson | 3 | 6 | 6^{1}
Q | (India) S Singh | 1 | 7 | 6
(United States) S Jenkins | 6 | 6^{1} | 4
(Paraguay) R Delgado | 6 | 2 | 1
2 | (United States) K Kim | 1 | 6 | 6

Quarterfinals
WC | (United Kingdom) D Inglot | 4 | 3
(United States) D Young | 6 | 6
Q | (India) S Singh | 5 | 7 | 6^{5}
2 | (United States) K Kim | 7 | 6^{3} | 7

Semifinals
(United States) D Young | 2 | 5
2 | (United States) K Kim | 6 | 7
