= 2009 SAT Khorat Open =

- Date: March 23 – March 29
- Edition: 1st
- Location: Khorat, Thailand

Champions

Singles
- (Germany) Andreas Beck

Doubles
- (India) Rohan Bopanna / (Pakistan) Aisam-ul-Haq Qureshi
SAT Khorat Open

The 2009 SAT Khorat Open was a professional tennis tournament played on outdoor hard courts. It was part of the 2009 ATP Challenger Tour. It took place in Khorat, Thailand between 23 and 29 March 2009.

== Single entrants ==
=== Seeds ===
Nationality	Player	Ranking*	Seeding
GER	Andreas Beck	86	1
JPN	Go Soeda	117	2
AUS	Chris Guccione	134	3
FRA	Mathieu Montcourt	136	4
RUS	Mikhail Elgin	138	5
GER	Daniel Brands	148	6
IND	Somdev Devvarman	150	7
THA	Danai Udomchoke	158	8

- Rankings are as of March 16, 2009.

=== Other entrants ===
The following players received wildcards into the singles main draw:

- (Bulgaria) Grigor Dimitrov
- (Thailand) Sonchat Ratiwatana
- (Thailand) Peerakiat Siriluethaiwattana
- (Thailand) Kittipong Wachiramanowong

The following players received entry from the qualifying draw:

- (Chinese Taipei) Chen Ti
- (Russia) Evgeny Donskoy
- (Ukraine) Denys Molchanov
- (Sweden) Filip Prpic

The following player received Special exempt into the main draw:

- (Israel) Noam Okun

== Champions ==
=== Men's singles ===
(Germany) Andreas Beck def. (Sweden) Filip Prpic, 7–5, 6–3

=== Men's doubles ===
(India) Rohan Bopanna / (Pakistan) Aisam-ul-Haq Qureshi def. (Thailand) Sanchai Ratiwatana / (Thailand) Sonchat Ratiwatana, 6–3, 6–7(5), [10–5]
