= 2017 Wimbledon Championships – Men's doubles qualifying =

Men's doubles qualifying
- 2017 Wimbledon Championships

Events
Singles	men	women		boys	girls
Doubles	men	women	mixed	boys	girls
WC Singles	men	women	quad
WC Doubles	men	women	quad
Legends	men	women	seniors

Qualification
Singles	men	women
Doubles	men	women
- Wimbledon Championships

Players and pairs who neither have high enough rankings nor receive wild cards may participate in a qualifying tournament held one week before the annual Wimbledon Tennis Championships.

== Seeds ==
1. (Thailand) Sanchai Ratiwatana / (Thailand) Sonchat Ratiwatana (first round)
2. (Croatia) Dino Marcan / (Austria) Tristan-Samuel Weissborn (qualifying competition, lucky losers)
3. (France) Hugo Nys / (Croatia) Antonio Šančić (qualified)
4. (Uruguay) Ariel Behar / (Belarus) Aliaksandr Bury (qualifying competition, lucky losers)
5. (Chinese Taipei) Hsieh Cheng-peng / (United States) Max Schnur (qualified)
6. (Germany) Kevin Krawietz / (Slovakia) Igor Zelenay (qualified)
7. (Argentina) Facundo Bagnis / (Peru) Sergio Galdós (first round)
8. (Sweden) Johan Brunström / (Sweden) Andreas Siljeström (qualified)

== Qualifiers ==
1. (Sweden) Johan Brunström / (Sweden) Andreas Siljeström
2. (Germany) Kevin Krawietz / (Slovakia) Igor Zelenay
3. (France) Hugo Nys / (Croatia) Antonio Šančić
4. (Chinese Taipei) Hsieh Cheng-peng / (United States) Max Schnur

== Lucky losers ==
1. (Uruguay) Ariel Behar / (Belarus) Aliaksandr Bury
2. (Croatia) Dino Marcan / (Austria) Tristan-Samuel Weissborn
3. (Netherlands) Sander Arends / (Chinese Taipei) Peng Hsien-yin
4. (Serbia) Ilija Bozoljac / (Italy) Flavio Cipolla

== Qualifying draw ==
=== First qualifier ===
First round
1	(Thailand) Sanchai Ratiwatana (Thailand) Sonchat Ratiwatana	6^{9}	3
(Netherlands) Sander Arends (Chinese Taipei) Peng Hsien-yin	7^{11}	6
(Japan) Taro Daniel (Indonesia) Christopher Rungkat	5	3
8	(Sweden) Johan Brunström (Sweden) Andreas Siljeström	7	6

Qualifying competition
(Netherlands) Sander Arends (Chinese Taipei) Peng Hsien-yin	6^{9}	4
8	(Sweden) Johan Brunström (Sweden) Andreas Siljeström	7^{11}	6

=== Second qualifier ===
First round
2	(Croatia) Dino Marcan (Austria) Tristan-Samuel Weissborn	6	6
Alt	(Barbados) Darian King (Canada) Peter Polansky	1	4
(Belgium) Ruben Bemelmans (United States) Tennys Sandgren	3	7^{7}	4
6	(Germany) Kevin Krawietz (Slovakia) Igor Zelenay	6	6^{4}	6

Qualifying competition
2	(Croatia) Dino Marcan (Austria) Tristan-Samuel Weissborn	5	3
6	(Germany) Kevin Krawietz (Slovakia) Igor Zelenay	7	6

=== Third qualifier ===
First round
3	(France) Hugo Nys (Croatia) Antonio Šančić	6	6
WC	(United Kingdom) Liam Broady (United Kingdom) Edward Corrie	3	4
(Serbia) Ilija Bozoljac (Italy) Flavio Cipolla	6	6^{4}	6
7	(Argentina) Facundo Bagnis (Peru) Sergio Galdós	4	7^{4}	3

Qualifying competition
3	(France) Hugo Nys (Croatia) Antonio Šančić	7^{7}	7^{11}
(Serbia) Ilija Bozoljac (Italy) Flavio Cipolla	6^{1}	6^{9}

=== Fourth qualifier ===
First round
4	(Uruguay) Ariel Behar (Belarus) Aliaksandr Bury	7	7^{8}
WC	(United Kingdom) Luke Bambridge (United Kingdom) Lloyd Glasspool	5	6^{6}
(Russia) Evgeny Donskoy (Russia) Konstantin Kravchuk	6	3	4
5	(Chinese Taipei) Hsieh Cheng-peng (United States) Max Schnur	4	6	6

Qualifying competition
4	(Uruguay) Ariel Behar (Belarus) Aliaksandr Bury	7^{8}	5	3
5	(Chinese Taipei) Hsieh Cheng-peng (United States) Max Schnur	6^{6}	7	6
