= 2010 American Express – TED Open =

- Date: August 9 – August 15
- Edition: 24th
- Location: Istanbul, Turkey

Champions

Singles
- (France) Adrian Mannarino

Doubles
- (Czech Republic) Leoš Friedl / (Serbia) Dušan Vemić
← 2009 ·	American Express – TED Open	· 2011 →

The 2010 American Express – TED Open was a professional tennis tournament played on outdoor hard courts. It was the twenty-fourth edition of the tournament which is part of the 2010 ATP Challenger Tour. It took place in Istanbul, Turkey between 9 and 15 August 2010.

== ATP entrants ==
=== Seeds ===
Nationality	Player	Ranking*	Seeding
BEL	Olivier Rochus	66	1
POR	Frederico Gil	81	2
KAZ	Mikhail Kukushkin	91	3
JAM	Dustin Brown	99	4
TUR	Marsel İlhan	106	5
ROU	Adrian Ungur	123	6
RUS	Igor Kunitsyn	124	7
AUT	Martin Fischer	130	8

- Rankings are as of August 2, 2010.

=== Other entrants ===
The following players received wildcards into the singles main draw:

- (Turkey) Haluk Akkoyun
- (Turkey) Tuna Altuna
- (Switzerland) George Bastl
- (Turkey) Marsel İlhan

The following players received a Special Exempt into the singles main draw:

- (France) Laurent Recouderc
- (France) Vincent Millot

The following players received entry from the qualifying draw:

- (Uzbekistan) Arsen Asanov
- (Spain) Javier Martí
- (Sweden) Filip Prpic
- (Portugal) João Sousa

== Champions ==
=== Singles ===
(France) Adrian Mannarino def. (Kazakhstan) Mikhail Kukushkin, 6–4, 3–6, 6–3

=== Doubles ===
(Czech Republic) Leoš Friedl / (Serbia) Dušan Vemić def. (United States) Brian Battistone / (Sweden) Andreas Siljeström, 7–6(6), 7–6(3)
