= 2010 Knoxville Challenger =

- Date: 8–14 November
- Edition: 7th
- Surface: Hard
- Location: Knoxville, Tennessee, USA

Champions

Singles
- (Japan) Kei Nishikori

Doubles
- (South Africa) Rik de Voest / (South Africa) Izak van der Merwe
← 2009 ·	Knoxville Challenger	· 2011 →

The 2010 Knoxville Challenger was a professional tennis tournament played on outdoor hard courts. It was the seventh edition of the tournament which was part of the 2010 ATP Challenger Tour. It took place in Knoxville, Tennessee, United States between 8 and 14 November 2010.

== Singles main-draw entrants ==
=== Seeds ===
Country	Player	Rank^{1}	Seed
USA	Ryan Sweeting	109	1
USA	Donald Young	125	2
JPN	Kei Nishikori	126	3
AUS	Peter Luczak	136	4
AUS	Marinko Matosevic	138	5
USA	Robert Kendrick	149	6
AUS	Carsten Ball	153	7
USA	Tim Smyczek	170	8

- Rankings are as of November 1, 2010.

=== Other entrants ===
The following players received wildcards into the singles main draw:

- (Serbia) Boris Čonkić
- (United States) Eric Quigley
- (Australia) John-Patrick Smith
- (United States) Rhyne Williams

The following players received entry from the qualifying draw:

- (India) Yuki Bhambri
- (Slovenia) Luka Gregorc
- (United States) David Martin
- (United States) Nicholas Monroe
- (South Africa) Fritz Wolmarans (LL)

== Champions ==
=== Singles ===
(Japan) Kei Nishikori def. (United States) Robert Kendrick, 6–1, 6–4

=== Doubles ===
(South Africa) Rik de Voest / (South Africa) Izak van der Merwe def. (United States) Alex Bogomolov Jr. / (United States) Alex Kuznetsov, 6–1, 6–4
