= 2010 Virginia National Bank Men's Pro Championship – Singles =

Singles
- 2010 Virginia National Bank Men's Pro Championship

Final
- Champion: (United States) Robert Kendrick
- Runner-up: (United States) Michael Shabaz
- Score: 6–2, 6–3

Events
Singles	Doubles
← 2009 ·	Virginia National Bank Men's Pro Championship	· 2011 →

Kevin Kim, who was the defending champion, lost to Greg Jones in the first round.
Robert Kendrick defeated qualifier Michael Shabaz in the final 6–2, 6–3 to win the tournament.

== Seeds ==
1. (United States) Taylor Dent (second round)
2. (India) Somdev Devvarman (quarterfinals)
3. (United States) Ryan Sweeting (first round)
4. (United States) Donald Young (quarterfinals)
5. (Japan) Kei Nishikori (quarterfinals)
6. (Australia) Marinko Matosevic (quarterfinals)
7. (Australia) Peter Luczak (first round)
8. (United States) Robert Kendrick (champion)

== Draw ==
=== Key ===
- Q = Qualifier
- WC = Wild card
- LL = Lucky loser
- Alt = Alternate
- SE = Special exempt
- PR = Protected ranking
- ITF = ITF entry
- JE = Junior exempt
- w/o = Walkover
- r = Retired
- d = Defaulted
- SR = Special ranking

=== Finals ===
Semifinals
(South Africa) Rik de Voest	6^{4}	4
8	(United States) Robert Kendrick	7	6
Q	(United States) Michael Shabaz	7	6
PR	(Australia) Chris Guccione	6^{7}	3

Final
8	(United States) Robert Kendrick	6	6
Q	(United States) Michael Shabaz	2	3

=== Top half ===
First round
1	(United States) T Dent	6	3	6
Q	(United States) M Yani	3	6	3
(Australia) C Ball	6	6^{6}	2
(South Africa) R de Voest	4	7	6
WC	(United States) A Domijan	3	6	6^{4}
Q	(India) Y Bhambri	6	3	7
(United States) L Cook	6	6^{2}	5
6	(Australia) M Matosevic	4	7	7
4	(United States) D Young	3	6	6
(United States) J Levine	6	4	4
(United States) B Reynolds	6	6
WC	(Philippines) TC Huey	3	4
(United States) T Smyczek	4	7	6
(Bosnia and Herzegovina) A Delić	6	6^{6}	1
(United States) A Kuznetsov	4	7	3
8	(United States) R Kendrick	6	5	6

Second round
1	(United States) T Dent	4	6^{6}
(South Africa) R de Voest	6	7
Q	(India) Y Bhambri	6^{2}	2
6	(Australia) M Matosevic	7	6
4	(United States) D Young	2	6	6
(United States) B Reynolds	6	3	4
(United States) T Smyczek	6^{4}	4
8	(United States) R Kendrick	7	6

Quarterfinals
(South Africa) R de Voest	7	6
6	(Australia) M Matosevic	6^{6}	3
4	(United States) D Young	2	5
8	(United States) R Kendrick	6	7

Semifinals
(South Africa) R de Voest	6^{4}	3
8	(United States) R Kendrick	7	6

=== Bottom half ===
First round
5	(Japan) K Nishikori	7	7
ALT	(United States) R DeHeart	5	5
WC	(United States) J Jenkins	3	1
WC	(Greece) T Angelinos	6	6
(Ecuador) G Lapentti	6^{1}	4
Q	(United States) M Shabaz	7	6
(United States) R Harrison	6	6
3	(United States) R Sweeting	3	4
7	(Australia) P Luczak	6^{4}	6	6^{5}
PR	(Australia) C Guccione	7	3	7
Q	(South Africa) F Wolmarans	3	7	3
(South Africa) I van der Merwe	6	6^{2}	6
(Australia) G Jones	4	6	7
(United States) K Kim	6	2	5
(United States) A Bogomolov Jr.	4	4
2	(India) S Devvarman	6	6

Second round
5	(Japan) K Nishikori	6	6
WC	(Greece) T Angelinos	4	2
Q	(United States) M Shabaz	6	3	6
(United States) R Harrison	4	6	3
PR	(Australia) C Guccione	6^{3}	7	7
(South Africa) I van der Merwe	7	6^{5}	5
(Australia) G Jones	3	3
2	(India) S Devvarman	6	6

Quarterfinals
5	(Japan) K Nishikori	6^{3}	1
Q	(United States) M Shabaz	7	6
PR	(Australia) C Guccione	7	6
2	(India) S Devvarman	6^{4}	3

Semifinals
Q	(United States) M Shabaz	7	6
PR	(Australia) C Guccione	6^{7}	3
