= SAT Khorat Open =

Defunct tennis tournament
- Event name: Khorat
- Location: Khorat, Thailand
- Category: ATP Challenger Tour
- Surface: Hard
- Draw: 32S/32Q/16D
- Prize money: $50,000

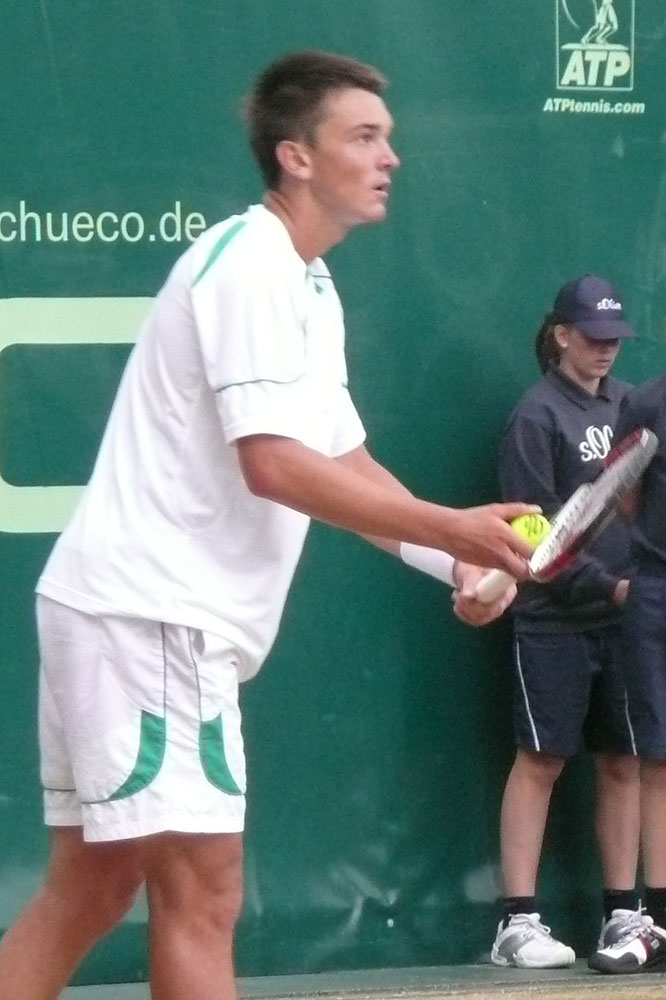
Andreas Beck from Germany won the first edition of the singles against Swede Filip Prpic

The SAT Khorat Open was a professional tennis tournament played on outdoor hard courts. It was part of the ATP Challenger Tour. The tournament was held in Khorat, Thailand in 2009.

== Past finals ==
=== Singles ===
Year	Champion	Runner-up	Score
2009	(Germany) Andreas Beck	(Sweden) Filip Prpic	7–5, 6–3

=== Doubles ===
Year	Champions	Runners-up	Score
2009	(India) Rohan Bopanna (Pakistan) Aisam-ul-Haq Qureshi	(Thailand) Sanchai Ratiwatana (Thailand) Sonchat Ratiwatana	6–3, 6–7(5), 10–5
