= Peter Polansky =

Canadian tennis player (born 1988)

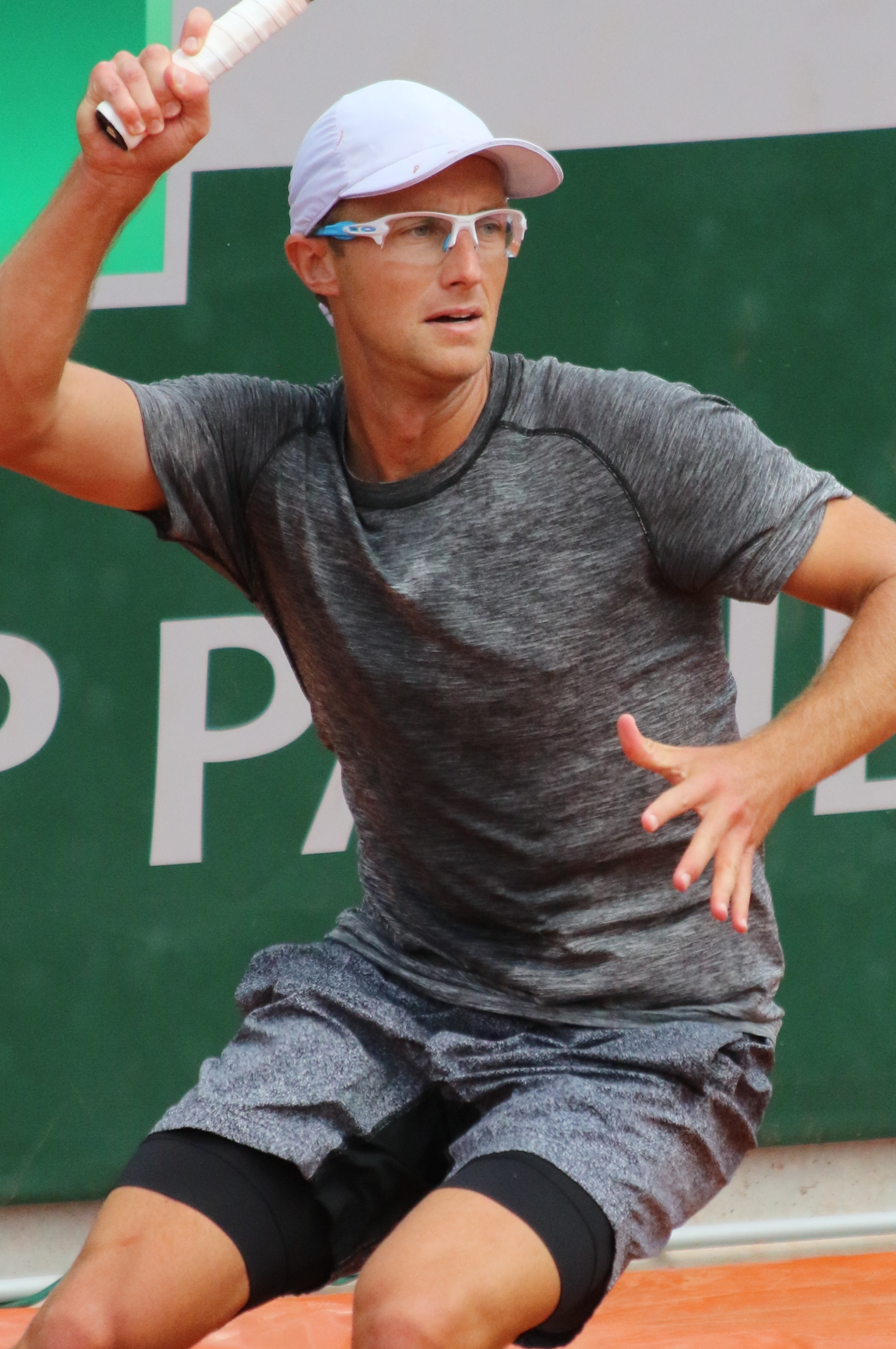
- Polansky at the 2018 French Open
- Country (sports): Canada
- Residence: Tampa, Florida, United States
- Born: June 15, 1988 (age 38) North York, Ontario, Canada
- Height: 1.83 m (6 ft 0 in)
- Turned pro: 2007
- Plays: Right-handed (two-handed backhand)
- Prize money: US$1,729,767

Singles
- Career record: 19–45
- Career titles: 0
- Highest ranking: No. 110 (25 June 2018)

Grand Slam singles results
- Australian Open: 1R (2009, 2017, 2018)
- French Open: 1R (2009, 2014, 2018)
- Wimbledon: 1R (2018)
- US Open: 2R (2010)

Doubles
- Career record: 3–7
- Career titles: 0
- Highest ranking: No. 123 (December 10, 2018)

Grand Slam doubles results
- Wimbledon: Q1 (2017, 2018)

Team competitions
- Davis Cup: 1R (2014)
- Last updated on: 27 February 2023.

Peter Polansky (/pəˈlænski/ pə-LAN-skee; born June 15, 1988) is a Canadian former professional tennis player of Czech origin. He was Canada's top singles player from June 21, 2010, until January 17, 2011, in the ATP rankings. He was also Canada's No. 2 from August 4, 2008, until June 21, 2010, with the exception of one week. In 2018, he became the first player in the Open Era to qualify for all four Grand Slam tournaments as a lucky loser within the same calendar year.

== Personal ==
Polansky (Czech: Polanský) was born in North York, Ontario, Canada.

Polansky survived a major scare as an 18-year-old. While in Mexico for a Davis Cup tie as a team hitting partner, he woke up sleepwalking and jumped or fell from a three-story room suffering serious injuries. Later, he said that he saw a dark figure approaching his bed wielding a knife and only thought about escaping through the window. He recovered miraculously to be playing tennis just four months later.

Polansky has been coached by Dean Coburn.

== Tennis career ==
=== 2004–2006 ===
Polansky played Canada F3, F4, and F5 Futures events in June 2004, compiling a win-lose record of 1–4. He next competed in a tour event as a wild-card in the 2005 Granby Challenger event, losing handily in the first round. He then played Canada F1, F2, and F3, in the late autumn, this time earning a 3–3 record and an ATP singles ranking of No. 1432. He also reached the final of the doubles for Canada F3, partnering compatriot Adil Shamasdin.

Polansky went 4–3 for Canada F1, F2, and F3 in 2006, this time played in March, and saw his ranking crack the top 1000. Losing again in the first round at Granby, he also received a wild-card for his first full-fledge ATP tourney, a Masters event at that, as he lost in the first round to compatriot Frank Dancevic at the 2006 Rogers Cup. Polansky then, as an unseeded Special Entry, proceeded to reach the finals of the US Open boys singles tournament. His run included three-set wins over top seed Martin Kližan in the second round and No. 4 seed Donald Young in the semis. He lost the final to No. 10 seed Dušan Lojda. Polansky then in late September reached the semi-finals of USA F25. He lost again however in the first round of a Canadian challenger, this time Rimouski in October. He finished the year ranked World No. 821.

=== 2007 ===
Peter began 2007 with a bang as he won three of four Futures in Central America in January: El Salvador F1, Guatemala F1, and Costa Rica F1. He singles ATP ranking consequently rose to No. 580 and he played in his first Davis Cup tie, in February, winning a dead rubber against a Colombian opponent. He then went 9–3 in February–March in Futures, including winning USA F6. He lost his first Davis Cup live rubber in April, in 4 sets to Flávio Saretta in an away tie to Brazil.

From May through September Polansky played on the Challenger circuit, going a respectable 6–7. His most impressive wins came over World No. 106 Danai Udomchoke, as the Thai retired from the match, and World No. 119 Kevin Kim. A second straight appearance as a wild card at the Rogers Cup ended with the same first round loss, this time to Fabio Fognini. Polansky finished 2007 ranked World No. 343.

=== 2008 ===
Polansky went 11–3 in the winter Futures tournaments in South America, winning Guatemala F1. He won both his matches in the Davis Cup tie against Mexico, including his first over World No. 172 Bruno Echagaray handily in straight sets. Canada won the tie 4–1. He then reached the quarter-finals of the Santiago Challenger in late February with wins over World No. ~230 Rajeev Ram and World No. 198 Adrián Menéndez Maceiras. In April, he accounted himself well in Canada's next Davis Cup tie, away to Chile, losing to World No. 15 Fernando González prior to winning a dead rubber. Polansky then reached the quarter-finals of the Florianópolis Challenger, defeating World No. 206 João Souza. He next reached the semi-finals of the Rabat Challenger during the first week of May 2008, defeating World No. 179 Laurent Recouderc in the second round. He also defeated World No. 120 Teymuraz Gabashvili in mid-May at the Marrakech Challenger, where he reached the second round. All of these results from April on occurred on a clay surface.

In May 2008, he participated in his first International Series-level event, as a qualifier, in the Grand Prix Hassan II event. He lost in the first round in three sets to former World No. 3 Guillermo Coria. He then participated in a qualifying tournament for a grand slam event for the first time, Wimbledon, losing in the first round. Polanksy then lost in successive challengers in the first round before reaching the second round at back-to-back challengers, played in Canada (Granby and Moncton). Polansky then defeated both Colombian No. 1 and tournament No. 4 seed Alejandro Falla and defending champion and Canada No. 2 Frédéric Niemeyer to reach the quarterfinals of the Vancouver challenger. In August, he reached the second round of the 2008 US Open qualifying tournament for singles, defeating Rajeev Ram before falling to No. 24 seed Simon Stadler.

Polansky went 9 wins, 7 losses on the autumn American challenger circuit, his best results were reaching the semifinals of one tourney and the quarters of two others; at Waco, where he lost in three tight sets to top seed Vince Spadea; and in Louisville, Kentucky, where he defeated World No. 133 Amer Delić and World No. 295 Michael Russell before falling to No. 2 seed Jesse Levine in the quarters. He then reached the semifinals of the Rimouski challenger, where he lost to eventual champion Ryan Sweeting.

=== 2009 ===
Polansky opened 2009 losing in the first round of qualifying for the Brisbane International. Coming through three rounds of qualifying, he lost to the 18th seed Igor Andreev from Russia in the first round of the Australian Open, despite being up on his opponent two sets to love. It was Polansky's first ever appearance in the main draw of a Grand Slam event. He followed this result by reaching the second round of the Carson, California and Dallas, Texas challengers. He next in February failed to qualify for the main draw of the 2009 SAP Open as well as 2009 Delray Beach International Tennis Championships.

Polansky had to withdraw from the Canadian Davis Cup team for their tie against Ecuador in early March due to a small tear detected in a right rotator cuff tendon as well as one in his labrum . He took a month off from the tour, coming back to lose in the first round of the Sanremo Tennis Cup. The following week he lost in the final round of qualifying for the Zagreb Open. Polansky next found the form he had before getting injured in qualifying for the 2009 French Open, winning his three matches all in straight sets, conceding no more than 4 games in any one set. In his first round match in the main draw, versus Philipp Petzschner, he fought back to level the match at 2 sets apiece before falling 3–6 in the fifth.

Following the French, Polansky lost convincingly to Simone Vagnozzi in the first round of Zenith Tennis Cup on red clay in Milan. He followed upon this by reaching the quarterfinals of the Lines Trophy, defeating Nicolás Massú in the second round before falling to veteran Jean-René Lisnard in straight sets. Polanksy rather surprisingly either chose not to enter Wimbledon qualifying or was not eligible. Instead he entered qualifying for the Sporting Challenger, also in Italy, and lost in the final qualifying round. After taking the following week off Polansky won the opening rubber of the Davis Cup tie away to Peru, defeating Iván Miranda in straight sets. Polansky became ill however and did not play in the 4th rubber. Despite losing their top clay court player, the Canadians won the tie 3–2.

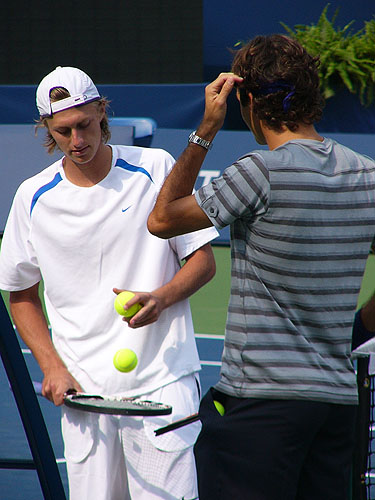
Polansky (left) and Roger Federer at practice during the 2009 Rogers Cup

The week after, Polansky lost in the opening round of the Seguros Bolívar Open Bogotá to Alejandro Falla. After a week off, the unseeded Polansky reached the semi-finals of the Granby Challenger, defeating José de Armas, Tobias Kamke, and Lester Cook before falling to No. 4 seed Kevin Anderson in the semis. In doubles Polansky and partner Bruno Agostinelli lost in the first round as a wild card entry. He lost to an in-form Xavier Malisse in the first round of the Odlum Brown Vancouver Open.

Polansky played at the Rogers Cup in Montreal. He defeated fellow Ontarian and wild card entrant Agostinelli before falling to No. 4 seed Novak Djokovic in the second. With no points for the following week to protect, this result saw Polansky climb 22 ranking spots to sit at World No. 203, just two places off his career high. Despite not playing in any tournament main draws the week after, Polansky rose three ranking spots to sit at World No. 200, a new career high.

Polansky qualified for US Open singles tournament by beating Alex Kuznetsov, No. 9 seed Michael Russell, and No. 28 seed Lukáš Lacko. In his first round main draw match, he came back from 2 sets down to even his match against Guillermo García López before falling in the fifth, 16. His singles ranking has climbed once again, to World No. 184. Following the Open, Polansky lost in the second round of Seguros Bolívar Open challenger, to top seed Horacio Zeballos. In doubles, he and partner Nicolás Todero lost in the second round. The following week at the Copa Petrobras Colombia, Polansky lost in the first round, to Ricardo Mello. In doubles, he and partner Alex Bogomolov Jr., unseeded, reached the semi-final round.

In early October Polansky became the World No. 181 ranked singles player, another career high. As the No.3 seed at the Challenger ATP Club Premium Open, he reached he quarter-finals, while in doubles he and partner Sebastián Decoud lost in the first round. The following week Polansky lost to No.1 seed Pablo Cuevas in the first round of the Uruguayan's home tournament, the Copa Petrobras. In doubles and partner Bogomolov lost in the second round. Polansky climbed to yet another new career high, World No. 170. The week after, he lost in the second round of Copa Petrobras Asunción in singles, to No. 4 seed Santiago Ventura. In doubles, again partnering Bogomolov, he has lost as well in the second round.

In late October Polansky reached the quarter-finals of the Copa Petrobras Santiago, beating No. 7 seed Sergio Roitman in the first round before falling to top seed Juan Ignacio Chela 3 and 3. In doubles, he and Bogomolov again lost in the second round (quarters). Polansky was off from competition for the remainder of the year. He finished 2009 ranked World No. 185 in singles and No. 554 in doubles.

=== 2010 ===
Polansky began the year by reaching the second qualifying round of the 2010 Aircel Chennai Open, losing as the no. 6 seed to unseeded Prakash Amritraj 11–9 in a third set tie-break. Amritraj went on to qualify for the main draw. Polansky failed to qualify for the Australian Open in singles.

Unseeded Polansky defeated Korean no.1 Im Kyu-tae in the first round of the Honolulu Challenger in three sets before losing in the second round to eighth seed Ryan Sweeting. He was then ranked outside the top 200 for the first time since August. At the Brasil Open, he defeated eighth seed Júlio Silva in the first qualifying round, but lost in the second round to fellow unseeded player Caio Zampieri.

Polansky failed to qualify for the Copa Telmex, losing to eighth seed Rubén Ramírez Hidalgo in the first round, in a close third-set tiebreaker. The following week, Polanksy lost in the first round of qualifying for the Delray Beach ATP 250 tournament, to fifth seed Paul Capdeville, in straight sets. The next week, Polansky played singles in Canada's Davis Cup tie against Colombia. He did not fare well, losing the opening singles rubber to world no. 183 Carlos Salamanca. Coach Martin Laurendeau opted to play Steven Diez in the reverse singles, as Canada lost the tie 1–4.

In April, Polansky failed by just one ranking place to be seeded in singles for the Challenger Banque Nationale. He defeated fifth seed Brendan Evans in the first round in straight sets, before falling to an in form Tim Smyczek, also in straight sets. In doubles, he and fellow Canuck Pierre-Ludovic Duclos lost in the first round. Two weeks later, Polansky lost in the second round of qualifying for the U.S. Clay Court Championships. The following week, he lost in the first round of the 2010 Baton Rouge Pro Tennis Classic to unseeded Joseph Sirianni, while in doubles he and partner Michael Yani lost in the second round. The next week, Polansky lost in the second round at the 2010 Tallahassee Tennis Challenger to eventual champion Brian Dabul. In doubles, he and partner Donald Young lost in the first round.

In May, Polansky lost in qualifying at the 2010 Serbia Open as the top seed, but entered the main draw as a lucky loser, where he lost to Horacio Zeballos. The following week, Polansky lost in the second round of the Zagreb Open to top seed Marcos Daniel, while in doubles he and partner Michael Yani lost in the first round. Polansky next was the sole Canadian in the draw for qualifying for the French Open. He lost in the first round, 7–9 in the third, to 28th seed Ramón Delgado. A week later, as the eighth seed at the 2010 LA Tennis Open USTA Men's Challenger, he reached the semifinals, where he lost fifth seed Robert Kendrick. In doubles, he and partner Milos Raonic lost in the first round.

In June, Polansky reached the second round of the 2010 Weil Tennis Academy Challenger, defeating fellow Canadian Pierre-Ludovic Duclos, before falling to Marinko Matosevic. He did likewise the following week at the 2010 Košice Open, beating Yannick Mertens handily, before falling to Ivo Minář. The following week, Polansky failed to qualify for Wimbledon for the second time again in the first round, going down to Marinko Matosevic. On June 21, Polansky found himself the new Canada no. 1 singles player. Then that week, unseeded at the 2010 Camparini Gioielli Cup, he beat Laurent Recouderc before losing to fifth seed and eventual runner-up Pablo Andújar.

After a couple of weeks off, Polansky reached the second round of the 2010 Comerica Bank Challenger, defeating sixth seed Kevin Kim, before falling to qualifier Brydan Klein. He also lost in the second round in doubles, partnering compatriot Milos Raonic. Polansky was the seventh seed at the 2010 Fifth Third Bank Tennis Championships, where he has defeated Chris Guccione in the first round handily, and Raven Klaasen in the second, before falling to top seed and eventual champion Carsten Ball. Again playing doubles with Raonic, the pair withdrew from their second-round match due to a Raonic injury.

In July, Polansky, as the eighth seed in singles at the 2010 Challenger Banque Nationale de Granby, lost to world no. 221 Greg Jones. (The singles field for this event featured the top eight ranked Canadian tour players.) In doubles, Polansky and partner Érik Chvojka reached the quarterfinals. The following week Polansky lost to top seed Taylor Dent in the first round of the 2010 Odlum Brown Vancouver Open in three sets. The next week, he appeared in the singles main draw of the 2010 Rogers Cup, having been granted a wild card, where he faced and beat no. 13 Jürgen Melzer in the first round. Peter lost in the second round, however, to Victor Hănescu in straight sets.

After a week off, Polansky qualified for singles play at the US Open, having defeated Santiago González, Franko Škugor, and John Millman in qualifying. Polansky advanced to the second round of the main draw, after defeating 30th seed Juan Mónaco. He was the first Canadian to advance to the second round since Daniel Nestor in 2000. He lost, however, in the next round to wild card entrant and former world no. 4 James Blake. This result saw his singles ranking return to near a career-high of world no. 176.

After the US Open, Polansky won both of his singles Davis Cup rubbers against the Dominican Republic, as Canada won the tie, a playoff to stay in the Americas Zone Group 1, 5–0. The following week, he reached the second round of the 2010 Chang-Sat Bangkok Open 2 in singles, defeating a Thai wild card entrant before falling to Sebastian Rieschick. A week later, Peter lost to unseeded Frederik Nielsen in the qualifying round of the PTT Thailand Open. Then, the following week, he lost to eighth seed Rajeev Ram in the first round of qualifying for the 2010 Rakuten Japan Open Tennis Championship. He did not play for the remainder of the year. Due to the surge of teenager Milos Raonic, Polansky once again became Canadian No. 2 in singles for the first time since June of the previous year.

=== 2017 ===
Polansky began his 2017 season playing a challenger event in Happy Valley, Australia by reaching the quarterfinals before losing to Omar Jasika, who lost in the final. Polansky was seeded 22nd in qualifying draw in his 8th appearance at the Australian Open. The top seed in his section was 4th seed Yūichi Sugita. Polansky beat both Tristan Lamasine and Mirza Bašić in straight sets before losing to Young Gun finalist Andrey Rublev in 3 sets. Polansky was able to enter the main draw as a lucky loser replacing Aussie Thanasi Kokkinakis. He drew the 30th seed, Pablo Carreño Busta in the first round and got out to a two sets to one lead but eventually he had to retire from the match with an illness in the 5th set.

From the start of February to the end of June, Polansky struggled to get positive results going 2–9 in challenger matches, 5–8 in qualifying matches and 0–1 in ATP matches. Polansky did qualify for Memphis, but lost in three sets to Matthew Ebden. At his seventh appearance at the French Open, he lost in the second round of qualifying to Alexander Bublik and at his seventh appearance at Wimbledon he lost to Stefano Travaglia in five sets after leading two sets to one.

Polansky returned to Canada to play the Canadian summer circuit including challengers in Winnipeg, Gatineau and Granby in July and he was defending a lot of points from 2016. Polansky lost in the final of all three challengers, losing to Blaž Kavčič twice and Denis Shapovalov. In the three tournament run, he beat Malek Jaziri, Brayden Schnur, Frank Dancevic and Denis Shapovalov and reached a career high ranking of 115. He followed up with a direct entry main draw performance in Los Cabos, where he beat Yasutaka Uchiyama for the third time in the month. Polansky got a wildcard into the Rogers Cup in Montreal where he beat Vasek Pospisil in straight sets before losing to world number 3, Roger Federer. Polansky ended his summer at the US Open, where he lost in third round of qualifying to Tim Smyczek in straight sets.

Polansky spent the end of the season playing in Asia in seven challenger events and two ATP events. He had some success playing challengers, reaching the semifinals in Gwangju, South Korea and the quarterfinals in Ningbo, China and in Ho Chi Minh City. He finished the year with a record of 2 wins and 4 losses on the ATP tour, but he had 36 wins combining ATP and challenger tours.

=== 2018: Lucky Loser Slam ===
Polansky began the year in Australia in Brisbane with qualifying wins over Filip Peliwo and Yannick Hanfmann. He lost a first match against a wildcard entry John Millman 6–7, 0–6. Polansky entered the Australian Open qualifying draw for the 9th time of his career. Seeded 26th in the qualifying draw, he beat João Domingues in the first round 7–6, 6–4. He followed up the win with a 6–2, 7–5 win over Christian Harrison before losing 1–6, 6–3, 6–3 to 15th seed, Yuki Bhambri. For the second consecutive year, Polansky got into the main draw as a lucky loser. Karen Khachanov served 21 aces as he beat Polansky 7–6, 7–6, 6–4.

In March, Polansky qualified for the 2018 BNP Paribas Open at Indian Wells by winning two matches. In the first round of the main draw, he beat Marius Copil 7–6^{(3)}, 6–7^{(5)}, 7–6^{(12)} on his eighth match point after saving two match points. The match took 3 hours and 11 minutes and there were five rallies over 35 shots in the deciding tiebreak. Polansky lost to the 20th seed Adrian Mannarino in straight sets in the second round. Polansky failed to qualify for the 2018 Miami Open falling in the second round to Rogério Dutra Silva in three close sets.

In May, Polansky entered the French Open qualifying draw for the 8th time in his career. Seeded 14th in the qualifying draw, he beat Norbert Gombos 2–6, 7–6^{(3)}, 6–2 in the first round. He followed up the win with a 6–4, 6–2 win over Peđa Krstin before losing 7–6^{(1)}, 7–6^{(3)} to Jozef Kovalík. For the second consecutive grand slam tournament, Polansky got into the main draw as a lucky loser. Pierre-Hugues Herbert beat Polansky in 4 sets, 6–3, 4–6, 6–2, 6–2.

In June, Polansky entered the Wimbledon qualifying draw for the 8th time in his career. Seeded 8th in the qualifying draw, he beat Yang Tsung-hua 4–6, 6–2, 6–3 in the first round. He followed up the win with a 7–5, 6–2 win over Alejandro Davidovich Fokina before losing 7–6^{(5)}, 6–3, 6–7^{(6)}, 6–4 to Jason Kubler in the third round of qualifying. It was the second consecutive year that Polansky lost in QR3. For the third consecutive grand slam tournament, Polansky got into the main draw as a lucky loser. Dennis Novak beat Polansky in 3 sets, 6–2, 6–3, 7–6^{(7)}.

In August, Polansky received a wild card to play in the 2018 Rogers Cup for the 10th time in his career. He reached the second round for the 6th time after beating Matthew Ebden. He played Novak Djokovic losing 6–3, 6–4. Polansky has lost twice against Novak Djokovic and twice against Roger Federer at the Roger's Cup. Polansky entered the US Open qualifying draw for the 10th time in his career. Seeded 12th in the qualifying draw, he beat Sergio Gutiérrez Ferrol 6–4, 6–4 in the first round. He followed up that win with a 7–6^{(7)}, 6–4 win over Santiago Giraldo before losing 7–5, 1–6, 6–3 to Donald Young despite winning more points in the match. For the fourth consecutive grand slam tournament, Polansky got into the main draw as a lucky loser. The achievement was dubbed the "lucky loser" slam. He lost to Alexander Zverev 6–2, 6–1, 6–2. Polansky is the only player ever to achieve the "lucky loser slam", and, as a result, the only player ever to have 8 grand slam losses in one year (including qualifying rounds).

Polansky won 46 matches in 2018. He played in 11 ATP events, a career high, with three wins. He played in ATP qualifying (non Grand Slam) seven times, successfully qualifying three times. He won 27 matches on the challenger tour. The highlights of the challenger season were a tournament win in Granby, a final in Charlottesville and four quarter-final results. He reached a career high of 110 in the world on June 25, 2018, and finished the year with an ATP ranking of 121. Due to the change in ranking system, his ranking to begin 2019 at 119 in the world. It was his best year end ranking and the seventh time he finished the year in the top 200. He also finished with a career best ranking of 125 in doubles.

== Performance timelines ==
Key
| W | F | SF | QF | #R | RR | Q# | DNQ | A | NH |

(W) winner; (F) finalist; (SF) semifinalist; (QF) quarterfinalist; (#R) rounds 4, 3, 2, 1; (RR) round-robin stage; (Q#) qualification round; (DNQ) did not qualify; (A) absent; (NH) not held; (SR) strike rate (events won / competed); (W–L) win–loss record.

=== Singles ===
| Tournament | 2005 | 2006 | 2007 | 2008 | 2009 | 2010 | 2011 | 2012 | 2013 | 2014 | 2015 | 2016 | 2017 | 2018 | 2019 | 2020 | 2021 | 2022 | 2023 | SR | W-L | Win % |
|---|---|---|---|---|---|---|---|---|---|---|---|---|---|---|---|---|---|---|---|---|---|---|
Grand Slam tournaments
| Australian Open | A | A | A | A | 1R | Q1 | Q3 | Q3 | Q3 | Q2 | A | Q1 | 1R | 1R | Q3 | Q1 | Q2 | A | A | 0 / 3 | 0–3 | 0% |
| French Open | A | A | A | A | 1R | Q1 | Q1 | Q2 | Q2 | 1R | A | A | Q2 | 1R | Q2 | Q1 | Q1 | A | A | 0 / 3 | 0–3 | 0% |
| Wimbledon | A | A | A | Q1 | A | Q1 | Q1 | Q2 | Q1 | Q2 | A | A | Q3 | 1R | Q1 | NH | A | A | A | 0 / 1 | 0–1 | 0% |
| US Open | A | A | A | Q2 | 1R | 2R | A | Q3 | Q1 | Q3 | A | Q1 | Q3 | 1R | Q2 | A | Q1 | A | A | 0 / 3 | 1–3 | 25% |
| Win–loss | 0–0 | 0–0 | 0–0 | 0–0 | 0–3 | 1–1 | 0–0 | 0–0 | 0–0 | 0–1 | 0–0 | 0–0 | 0–1 | 0–4 | 0–0 | 0–0 | 0–0 | 0-0 | 0-0 | 0 / 10 | 1–10 | 9% |
ATP Tour Masters 1000
| Indian Wells Masters | A | A | A | A | A | A | Q1 | A | A | 1R | A | 1R | Q1 | 2R | Q1 | NH | Q1 | A | A | 0 / 3 | 1–3 | 25% |
| Miami Open | A | A | A | A | A | A | A | A | A | Q2 | A | Q1 | Q1 | Q2 | Q1 | NH | A | A | A | 0 / 0 | 0–0 | – |
| Canadian Open | Q1 | 1R | 1R | 1R | 2R | 2R | A | 1R | 1R | 2R | Q1 | 2R | 2R | 2R | 1R | NH | Q2 | A | Q1 | 0 / 12 | 6–12 | 33% |
| Cincinnati Masters | A | A | A | A | A | A | A | A | A | Q1 | A | A | A | A | A | A | A | A | | 0 / 0 | 0–0 | – |
| Shanghai Masters | A | A | A | A | A | A | A | A | A | A | A | A | Q1 | A | A | NH | | A | | 0 / 0 | 0–0 | – |
| Win–loss | 0–0 | 0–1 | 0–1 | 0–1 | 1–1 | 1–1 | 0–0 | 0–1 | 0–1 | 1–2 | 0–0 | 1–2 | 1–1 | 2–2 | 0–1 | 0–0 | 0–0 | 0-0 | 0-0 | 0 / 15 | 7–15 | 32% |

=== Doubles ===
| Tournament | 2017 | 2018 | 2019 | 2020 | 2021 | SR | W-L |
|---|---|---|---|---|---|---|---|
Grand Slam tournaments
| Australian Open | A | A | A | A | A | 0 / 0 | 0–0 |
| French Open | A | A | A | A | A | 0 / 0 | 0–0 |
| Wimbledon | Q1 | Q1 | A | NH | A | 0 / 0 | 0–0 |
| US Open | A | A | A | A | A | 0 / 0 | 0–0 |
| Win–loss | 0–0 | 0–0 | 0–0 | 0–0 | 0–0 | 0 / 0 | 0–0 |
ATP Tour Masters 1000
| Canadian Open | A | A | 2R | NH | 1R | 0 / 2 | 1–2 |
National representation
| ATP Cup | NH | | | QF | RR | 0 / 2 | 1–1 |

== ATP Challenger Tour and ITF Futures finals ==
=== Singles: 32 (19–13) ===
| Legend (singles) ATP Challenger Tour (4–8) ITF Futures Tour (15–5) | Finals by surface Hard (15–11) Clay (4–1) Grass (0–0) Carpet (0–1) |

| Result | W–L | Date | Tournament | Tier | Surface | Opponent | Score |
|---|---|---|---|---|---|---|---|
| Win | 1–0 | Jan 2007 | El Salvador F1, Santa Tecla | Futures | Clay | (Slovakia) Jan Stancik | 5–7, 6–1, 6–2 |
| Win | 2–0 | Jan 2007 | Guatemala F1, Guatemala City | Futures | Hard | (United States) John Paul Fruttero | 7–6^{(7–5)}, 6–3 |
| Win | 3–0 | Feb 2007 | Costa Rica F1, San José | Futures | Hard | (United States) Lester Cook | 2–6, 7–5, 6–3 |
| Win | 4–0 | Mar 2007 | USA F6, McAllen | Futures | Hard | (South Africa) Wesley Whitehouse | 6–3, 6–2 |
| Win | 5–0 | Jan 2008 | Guatemala F1, Guatemala City | Futures | Hard | (Uruguay) Marcel Felder | 7–6^{(7–5)}, 6–3 |
| Win | 6–0 | Sep 2011 | Canada F7, Markham | Futures | Hard (i) | (United States) Jesse Levine | 6–4, 3–6, 7–5 |
| Win | 7–0 | Oct 2011 | Venezuela F8, Caracas | Futures | Hard | (Colombia) Eduardo Struvay | 6–1, 6–3 |
| Win | 8–0 | Oct 2011 | USA F26, Austin | Futures | Hard | (Australia) John-Patrick Smith | 4–6, 7–6^{(7–5)}, 6–4 |
| Win | 9–0 | Feb 2012 | USA F5, Brownsville | Futures | Hard | (United Kingdom) Daniel Cox | 6–1, 6–3 |
| Loss | 9–1 | Mar 2012 | USA F6, Harlingen | Futures | Hard | (Italy) Thomas Fabbiano | 1–6, 6–4, 3–6 |
| Loss | 9–2 | Mar 2012 | Canada F2, Sherbrooke | Futures | Carpet (i) | (Germany) Stefan Seifert | 3–6, 6–7^{(4–7)} |
| Loss | 9–3 | Jul 2012 | Panama City, Panama | Challenger | Clay | (Brazil) Rogério Dutra da Silva | 3–6, 0–6 |
| Loss | 9–4 | Aug 2012 | Canada F5, Mississauga | Futures | Hard | (Thailand) Danai Udomchoke | 5–7, 6–7^{(5–7)} |
| Win | 10–4 | Sep 2012 | Canada F7, Toronto | Futures | Clay | (United States) Chase Buchanan | 6–4, 6–4 |
| Loss | 10–5 | Sep 2012 | Canada F9, Markham | Futures | Hard (i) | (United States) Tennys Sandgren | 4–6, 3–6 |
| Win | 11–5 | Sep 2013 | Canada F7, Toronto | Futures | Clay | (United States) Jason Jung | 6–1, 6–1 |
| Win | 12–5 | Sep 2013 | Canada F8, Toronto | Futures | Hard | (India) Sanam Singh | 6–2, 6–2 |
| Win | 13–5 | Oct 2013 | Tiburon, United States | Challenger | Hard | (Australia) Matthew Ebden | 7–5, 6–3 |
| Loss | 13–6 | Nov 2013 | Charlottesville, United States | Challenger | Hard (i) | (United States) Michael Russell | 5–7, 6–2, 6–7^{(5–7)} |
| Loss | 13–7 | Nov 2013 | Knoxville, United States | Challenger | Hard (i) | (United States) Tim Smyczek | 4–6, 2–6 |
| Win | 14–7 | May 2016 | USA F16, Tampa | Futures | Clay | (Ecuador) Roberto Quiroz | 7–5, 6–3 |
| Win | 15–7 | Jun 2016 | Canada F3, Richmond | Futures | Hard | (Chinese Taipei) Jason Jung | 6–1, 6–4 |
| Win | 16–7 | Jul 2016 | Canada F4, Kelowna | Futures | Hard | (United States) Raymond Sarmiento | 6–2, 6–4 |
| Loss | 16–8 | Jul 2016 | Canada F5, Saskatoon | Futures | Hard | (Canada) Philip Bester | 4–6, 6–4, 4–6 |
| Win | 17–8 | Aug 2016 | Gatineau, Canada | Challenger | Hard | (France) Vincent Millot | 3–6, 6–4, ret. |
| Loss | 17–9 | Nov 2016 | Knoxville, United States | Challenger | Hard (i) | (United States) Michael Mmoh | 5–7, 6–2, 1–6 |
| Loss | 17–10 | Jul 2017 | Winnipeg, Canada | Challenger | Hard | (Slovenia) Blaž Kavčič | 5–7, 6–3, 5–7 |
| Loss | 17–11 | Jul 2017 | Gatineau, Canada | Challenger | Hard | (Canada) Denis Shapovalov | 1–6, 6–3, 3–6 |
| Loss | 17–12 | Jul 2017 | Granby, Canada | Challenger | Hard | (Slovenia) Blaž Kavčič | 3–6, 6–2, 5–7 |
| Win | 18–12 | Jul 2018 | Granby, Canada | Challenger | Hard | (France) Ugo Humbert | 6–4, 1–6, 6–2 |
| Loss | 18–13 | Nov 2018 | Charlottesville, USA | Challenger | Hard | (United States) Tommy Paul | 2–6, 2–6 |
| Win | 19–13 | Sep 2019 | Columbus, United States | Challenger | Hard (i) | (United States) J. J. Wolf | 6–3, 7–6^{(7–4)} |

=== Doubles: 43 (22–21) ===
| Legend (doubles) ATP Challenger Tour (18–14) ITF Futures Tour (4–7) | Finals by surface Hard (19–14) Clay (3–6) Grass (0–0) Carpet (0–1) |

| Result | W–L | Date | Tournament | Tier | Surface | Partner | Opponents | Score |
|---|---|---|---|---|---|---|---|---|
| Loss | 0–1 | Nov 2005 | Canada F3, Montreal | Futures | Hard | (Canada) Adil Shamasdin | (Canada) Clay Donato (United States) Jesse Levine | 2–6, 7–6^{(7–5)}, 3–6 |
| Loss | 0–2 | Mar 2007 | USA F6, McAllen | Futures | Hard | (United States) Donald Young | (United States) Patrick Briaud (United States) Lesley Joseph | 5–7, 3–6 |
| Win | 1–2 | Jul 2008 | Granby, Canada | Challenger | Hard | (Canada) Philip Bester | (United States) Alberto Francis (United States) Nicholas Monroe | 2–6, 6–1, [10–5] |
| Win | 2–2 | Feb 2011 | Burnie, Australia | Challenger | Hard | (Canada) Philip Bester | (Australia) Marinko Matosevic (New Zealand) Jose Rubin Statham | 6–4, 3–6, [14–12] |
| Win | 3–2 | Sep 2011 | Canada F7, Markham | Futures | Hard | (Canada) Milan Pokrajac | (United States) Tennys Sandgren (United States) Rhyne Williams | 4–6, 6–3, [10–8] |
| Loss | 3–3 | Mar 2012 | Canada F2, Sherbrooke | Futures | Carpet | (Canada) Milan Pokrajac | (Romania) Andrei Dăescu (Romania) Florin Mergea | 6–7^{(6–8)}, 6–3, [1–10] |
| Loss | 3–4 | Jul 2012 | Panama City, Panama | Challenger | Clay | (United States) Daniel Kosakowski | (Ecuador) Julio César Campozano (Colombia) Alejandro González | 4–6, 5–7 |
| Win | 4–4 | Sep 2012 | Canada F7, Toronto | Futures | Clay | (Australia) Carsten Ball | (United States) Sekou Bangoura (United States) Bjorn Fratangelo | 6–7^{(2–7)}, 6–4, [11–9] |
| Loss | 4–5 | Sep 2012 | Canada F9, Markham | Futures | Hard | (Australia) Carsten Ball | (United States) Chase Buchanan (United States) Tennys Sandgren | 2–6, 6–4, [7–10] |
| Loss | 4–6 | Mar 2013 | Canada F1, Gatineau | Futures | Hard | (United States) Adam El Mihdawy | (Germany) Moritz Baumann (Germany) Tim Pütz | 6–7^{(0–7)}, 1–6 |
| Loss | 4–7 | May 2013 | Tallahassee, United States | Challenger | Clay | (Australia) Greg Jones | (United States) Austin Krajicek (United States) Tennys Sandgren | 6–1, 2–6, [8–10] |
| Win | 5–7 | Jul 2013 | Granby, Canada | Challenger | Hard | (Canada) Érik Chvojka | (United States) Adam El Mihdawy (Croatia) Ante Pavić | 6–4, 6–3 |
| Win | 6–7 | Jul 2013 | Lexington, United States | Challenger | Hard | (Canada) Frank Dancevic | (United States) Bradley Klahn (New Zealand) Michael Venus | 7–5, 6–3 |
| Loss | 6–8 | Sep 2013 | Canada F7, Toronto | Futures | Clay | (Canada) Milan Pokrajac | (United States) Jean-Yves Aubone (United States) Sekou Bangoura | 4–6, 4–6 |
| Loss | 6–9 | Sep 2013 | Canada F8, Toronto | Futures | Hard | (Canada) Milan Pokrajac | (United States) Jason Jung (United States) Evan King | 5–7, 2–6 |
| Loss | 6–10 | Nov 2013 | Knoxville, United States | Challenger | Hard | (Australia) Carsten Ball | (Australia) Sam Groth (Australia) John-Patrick Smith | 7–6^{(8–6)}, 2–6, [7–10] |
| Loss | 6–11 | Jun 2014 | Prostějov, Czech Republic | Challenger | Clay | (Canada) Adil Shamasdin | (Germany) Andre Begemann (Czech Republic) Lukáš Rosol | 1–6, 2–6 |
| Win | 7–11 | Jul 2014 | Manta, Ecuador | Challenger | Hard | (United States) Chase Buchanan | (Venezuela) Luis David Martinez (Colombia) Eduardo Struvay | 6–4, 6–4 |
| Win | 8–11 | Jul 2014 | Lexington, United States | Challenger | Hard | (Canada) Adil Shamasdin | (United States) Chase Buchanan (Republic of Ireland) James McGee | 6–4, 6–2 |
| Win | 9–11 | Sep 2014 | Napa, United States | Challenger | Hard | (Canada) Adil Shamasdin | (United States) Bradley Klahn (United States) Tim Smyczek | 7–6^{(7–0)}, 6–1 |
| Loss | 9–12 | Oct 2014 | Sacramento, United States | Challenger | Hard | (Canada) Adil Shamasdin | (Australia) Adam Hubble (Australia) John-Patrick Smith | 3–6, 2–6 |
| Win | 10–12 | Jul 2015 | Granby, Canada | Challenger | Hard | (Canada) Philip Bester | (France) Enzo Couacaud (Australia) Luke Saville | 6–7^{(5–7)}, 7–6^{(7–2)}, [10–7] |
| Loss | 10–13 | Nov 2015 | Charlottesville, United States | Challenger | Hard | (Canada) Adil Shamasdin | (United States) Chase Buchanan (United States) Tennys Sandgren | 6–3, 4–6, [5–10] |
| Win | 11–13 | Feb 2016 | Cuernavaca, Mexico | Challenger | Hard | (Canada) Philip Bester | (El Salvador) Marcelo Arévalo (Peru) Sergio Galdós | 6–4, 3–6, [10–6] |
| Win | 12–13 | Jun 2016 | Canada F3, Richmond | Futures | Hard | (Canada) Philip Bester | (United Kingdom) Farris Fathi Gosea (United States) Tim Kopinski | 7–6^{(7–2)}, 6–2 |
| Win | 13–13 | Jul 2016 | Canada F5, Saskatoon | Futures | Hard | (Canada) Philip Bester | (Canada) Christian Lakoseljac (Canada) David Volfson | 6–3, 6–2 |
| Win | 14–13 | Sep 2016 | Cary, United States | Challenger | Hard | (Canada) Philip Bester | (United States) Stefan Kozlov (United States) Austin Krajicek | 6–2, 6–2 |
| Loss | 14–14 | Sep 2016 | Columbus, United States | Challenger | Hard | (Canada) Philip Bester | (Latvia) Miķelis Lībietis (United States) Dennis Novikov | 5–7, 6–7^{(4–7)} |
| Win | 15–14 | Nov 2016 | Knoxville, United States | Challenger | Hard (i) | (Canada) Adil Shamasdin | (Belgium) Ruben Bemelmans (Belgium) Joris De Loore | 6–1, 6–3 |
| Loss | 15–15 | Apr 2017 | Sarasota, United States | Challenger | Clay | (United States) Stefan Kozlov | (United States) Scott Lipsky (Austria) Jürgen Melzer | 2–6, 4–6 |
| Win | 16–15 | May 2017 | Savannah, United States | Challenger | Clay | (United Kingdom) Neal Skupski | (United Kingdom) Luke Bambridge (United States) Mitchell Krueger | 4–6, 6–3, [10–1] |
| Loss | 16–16 | Sep 2017 | Shanghai, China | Challenger | Hard | (United States) Bradley Klahn | (Japan) Toshihide Matsui (Chinese Taipei) Chu-Huan Yi | 6–7^{(1–7)}, 6–4, [5–10] |
| Loss | 16–17 | Apr 2018 | Sarasota, United States | Challenger | Clay | (United States) Christian Harrison | (United States) Evan King (United States) Hunter Reese | 1–6, 2–6 |
| Win | 17–17 | May 2018 | Bordeaux, France | Challenger | Clay | (United States) Bradley Klahn | (Argentina) Guillermo Durán (Argentina) Máximo González | 6–3, 3–6, [10–7] |
| Loss | 17–18 | Jul 2018 | Gatineau, Canada | Challenger | Hard | (Barbados) Darian King | (United States) Robert Galloway (United States) Bradley Klahn | 6–7^{(4–7)}, 6–4, [8–10] |
| Win | 18–18 | Sep 2018 | Columbus, United States | Challenger | Hard (i) | (United States) Tommy Paul | (Ecuador) Gonzalo Escobar (Ecuador) Roberto Quiroz | 6–3, 6–3 |
| Win | 19–18 | Jul 2019 | Winnipeg, Canada | Challenger | Hard | (Barbados) Darian King | (United States) Hunter Reese (Canada) Adil Shamasdin | 7–6^{(10–8)}, 6–3 |
| Win | 20–18 | Oct 2019 | Fairfield, United States | Challenger | Hard | (Barbados) Darian King | (Netherlands) Sem Verbeek (Sweden) André Göransson | 6–4, 3–6, [12–10] |
| Loss | 20–19 | Feb 2021 | Potchefstroom, South Africa | Challenger | Hard | (Canada) Brayden Schnur | (Switzerland) Marc-Andrea Hüsler (Czech Republic) Zdeněk Kolář | 4–6, 6–2, [4–10] |
| Win | 21–19 | June 2021 | Orlando, United States | Challenger | Hard | (United States) Christian Harrison | (United States) JC Aragone (Colombia) Nicolás Barrientos | 6-2, 6–3 |
| Loss | 21–20 | Jul 2021 | Nur-Sultan, Kazakhstan | Challenger | Hard | (Ukraine) Sergiy Stakhovsky | (Chinese Taipei) Hsu Yu-hsiou (Zimbabwe) Benjamin Lock | 6–2, 1–6, [7–10] |
| Loss | 21–21 | Sep 2021 | Cary, USA | Challenger | Hard | (United States) Stefan Kozlov | (United States) William Blumberg (United States) Max Schnur | 4–6, 6–1, [4–10] |
| Win | 22–21 | Sep 2021 | Columbus, United States | Challenger | Hard (i) | (United States) Stefan Kozlov | (United States) Andrew Lutschaunig (Japan) James Trotter | 7–5, 7–6^{(7–5)} |

== Junior Grand Slam finals ==
=== Singles: 1 (1 runner-up) ===
| Result | Year | Tournament | Surface | Opponent | Score |
|---|---|---|---|---|---|
| Loss | 2006 | US Open | Hard | (Czech Republic) Dušan Lojda | 6–7^{(4–7)}, 3–6 |
