= Kaden Hensel =

Australian tennis player (born 1986)

- Country (sports): Australia
- Residence: St Kilda, Australia
- Born: 5 June 1986 (age 40) Canberra, Australia
- Turned pro: 2004
- Plays: Right-handed (two handed-backhand)
- Prize money: $557,229

Singles
- Career record: 0–0 (at ATP Tour level, Grand Slam level, and in Davis Cup)
- Career titles: 0
- Highest ranking: No. 390 (12 July 2010)

Grand Slam singles results
- Australian Open: Q1 (2010)

Doubles
- Career record: 1–2 (at ATP Tour level, Grand Slam level, and in Davis Cup)
- Career titles: 2 ATP Challenger, 10 ITF Futures
- Highest ranking: No. 121 (9 August 2010)

Grand Slam doubles results
- Australian Open: 2R (2010)
- Last updated on: 25 July 2016.

Kaden Hensel (born 5 June 1986) is a former Australian tennis player.

Hensel has a career high ATP singles ranking of 390 achieved on 12 July 2010. He also has a career high ATP doubles ranking of 121 achieved on 9 August 2010. Hensel has won 2 ATP Challenger Tour doubles titles as well as 10 ITF Futures doubles titles.

Hensel made his ATP main draw debut at the 2010 Brisbane International, partnering Bernard Tomic. Later that month, Hensel made his grand slam debut at the 2010 Australian Open, partnering Greg Jones. The pair reached the second round where they lost to Ivo Karlović and Dušan Vemić in three sets.
