= Filip Prpic =

Swedish tennis player

- Country (sports): Sweden
- Residence: Helsingborg, Sweden
- Born: 26 May 1982 (age 43) Helsingborg, Sweden
- Height: 1.73 m (5 ft 8 in)
- Turned pro: 2002
- Retired: 2012
- Plays: Right-handed (two-handed backhand)
- Prize money: $293,095

Singles
- Career record: 2–12
- Career titles: 0
- Highest ranking: No. 194 (1 May 2006)

Grand Slam singles results
- Australian Open: Q2 (2005, 2006, 2007)
- French Open: Q2 (2005, 2006)
- Wimbledon: Q3 (2005)
- US Open: Q3 (2008)

Doubles
- Career record: 1–8
- Career titles: 0
- Highest ranking: No. 277 (30 October 2006)
- Last updated on: 6 September 2022.

Filip Prpic (Croatian: Prpić) (born 26 May 1982) is a Swedish former professional player of Croatian descent on the Association of Tennis Professionals (ATP) Tour. Prpic's career-high ranking was World Number 194, which he achieved on 1 May 2006.

== ATP Challenger and ITF Futures finals ==
=== Singles: 13 (9–4) ===
| Legend ATP Challenger (2–1) ITF Futures (7–3) | Finals by surface Hard (8–2) Clay (1–2) Grass (0–0) Carpet (0–0) |

| Result | W–L | Date | Tournament | Tier | Surface | Opponent | Score |
|---|---|---|---|---|---|---|---|
| Win | 1–0 | May 2003 | Korea F4, Seogwipo | Futures | Hard | (South Korea) Park Seung-Kyu | 6–0, 6–3 |
| Win | 2–0 | Jun 2004 | Kuwait F1, Mishref | Futures | Hard | (Germany) Ivo Klec | 6–3, 6–3 |
| Win | 3–0 | Jun 2004 | Kuwait F2, Mishref | Futures | Hard | (Germany) Ivo Klec | 7–6^{(7–3)}, 6–2 |
| Win | 4–0 | Jul 2005 | Valladolid, Spain | Challenger | Hard | (Chinese Taipei) Jimmy Wang | 6–2, 7–6^{(7–5)} |
| Loss | 4–1 | Apr 2006 | Great Britain F6, Bath | Futures | Hard | (France) Jo-Wilfried Tsonga | 3–6, 1–6 |
| Win | 5–1 | Apr 2006 | Lanzarote, Spain | Challenger | Hard | (France) Jo-Wilfried Tsonga | 3–6, 6–3, 6–4 |
| Win | 6–1 | Jun 2007 | Italy F16, Cesena | Futures | Clay | (Argentina) Eduardo Schwank | 6–4, 6–2 |
| Loss | 6–2 | Jun 2007 | Netherlands F1, Alkmaar | Futures | Clay | (Netherlands) Nick van der Meer | 0–6, 4–6 |
| Loss | 6–3 | Aug 2007 | Italy F27, Bolzano | Futures | Clay | (Argentina) Diego Junqueira | 7–6^{(7–2)}, 3–6, 3–6 |
| Win | 7–3 | Nov 2008 | UAE F2, Fujairah | Futures | Hard | (United Kingdom) James Ward | 7–6^{(7–5)}, 6–1 |
| Loss | 7–4 | Mar 2009 | Khorat, Thailand | Challenger | Hard | (Germany) Andreas Beck | 5–7, 3–6 |
| Win | 8–4 | Sep 2009 | Italy F28, Porto Torres | Futures | Hard | (Latvia) Adrians Zguns | 6–3, 6–2 |
| Win | 9–4 | Sep 2010 | Italy F27, Brusaporto | Futures | Hard | (Lithuania) Laurynas Grigelis | 6–3, 6–4 |

=== Doubles: 11 (6–5) ===
| Legend ATP Challenger (2–3) ITF Futures (4–2) | Finals by surface Hard (3–4) Clay (3–1) Grass (0–0) Carpet (0–0) |

| Result | W–L | Date | Tournament | Tier | Surface | Partner | Opponents | Score |
|---|---|---|---|---|---|---|---|---|
| Loss | 0–1 | Jun 2001 | Germany F6, Kassel | Futures | Clay | (Sweden) Jon Wallmark | (Ukraine) Orest Tereshchuk (Uzbekistan) Dmitriy Tomashevich | 7–5, 3–6, 1–6 |
| Win | 1–1 | Sep 2001 | Poland F3, Wrocław | Futures | Clay | (Sweden) Robert Lindstedt | (France) Olivier Le Jeune (Australia) Peter Luczak | 7–6^{(7–4)}, 6–7^{(5–7)}, 6–4 |
| Loss | 1–2 | Apr 2006 | Cardiff, United Kingdom | Challenger | Hard | (Sweden) Bjorn Rehnquist | (Germany) Philipp Petzschner (Austria) Alexander Peya | 6–4, 3–6, [7–10] |
| Loss | 1–3 | Aug 2006 | Segovia, Spain | Challenger | Hard | (Sweden) Johan Landsberg | (Australia) Paul Baccanello (Australia) Chris Guccione | 3–6, 6–7^{(2–7)} |
| Win | 2–3 | Oct 2006 | Nottingham, United Kingdom | Challenger | Hard | (France) Nicolas Tourte | (United Kingdom) Jamie Delgado (United Kingdom) Jamie Murray | 6–4, 4–6, [10–7] |
| Win | 3–3 | Mar 2008 | Italy F3B, Rome | Futures | Clay | (Italy) Mirko Nasoni | (Italy) Leonardo Azzaro (Italy) Pietro Fanucci | 7–6^{(7–3)}, 6–3 |
| Loss | 3–4 | Nov 2008 | UAE F2, Fujairah | Futures | Hard | (Denmark) Thomas Kromann | (Ukraine) Denys Molchanov (Ukraine) Ivan Sergeyev | 6–2, 5–7, [5–10] |
| Win | 4–4 | Feb 2009 | Italy F2, Trento | Futures | Hard | (Italy) Leonardo Azzaro | (Italy) Davide Della Tommasina (Italy) Alessandro Giannessi | 6–3, 6–1 |
| Win | 5–4 | Aug 2009 | Istanbul, Turkey | Challenger | Hard | (Portugal) Fred Gil | (Bulgaria) Grigor Dimitrov (Turkey) Marsel Ilhan | 3–6, 6–2, [10–6] |
| Loss | 5–5 | Jul 2010 | Pozoblanco, Spain | Challenger | Hard | (United States) Brian Battistone | (Spain) Marcel Granollers (Spain) Gerard Granollers-Pujol | 4–6, 6–4, [4–10] |
| Win | 6–5 | Apr 2011 | Italy F4, Rome | Futures | Clay | (Argentina) Leandro Migani | (Italy) Francesco Aldi (Italy) Marco Cecchinato | 6–3, 3–6, [10–6] |

== Performance timeline ==
Key
| W | F | SF | QF | #R | RR | Q# | P# | DNQ | A | Z# | PO | G | S | B | NMS | NTI | P | NH |

(W) winner; (F) finalist; (SF) semifinalist; (QF) quarterfinalist; (#R) rounds 4, 3, 2, 1; (RR) round-robin stage; (Q#) qualification round; (P#) preliminary round; (DNQ) did not qualify; (A) absent; (Z#) Davis/Fed Cup Zonal Group (with number indication) or (PO) play-off; (G) gold, (S) silver or (B) bronze Olympic/Paralympic medal; (NMS) not a Masters tournament; (NTI) not a Tier I tournament; (P) postponed; (NH) not held; (SR) strike rate (events won / competed); (W–L) win–loss record.

=== Singles ===
| Tournament | 2004 | 2005 | 2006 | 2007 | 2008 | SR | W–L | Win% |
|---|---|---|---|---|---|---|---|---|
Grand Slam tournaments
| Australian Open | A | Q2 | Q2 | Q2 | Q1 | 0 / 0 | 0–0 | – |
| French Open | A | Q2 | Q2 | A | Q1 | 0 / 0 | 0–0 | – |
| Wimbledon | A | Q3 | Q1 | A | Q1 | 0 / 0 | 0–0 | – |
| US Open | Q1 | Q1 | Q2 | A | Q3 | 0 / 0 | 0–0 | – |
| Win–loss | 0–0 | 0–0 | 0–0 | 0–0 | 0–0 | 0 / 0 | 0–0 | – |
