= 2019 Jerusalem Volvo Open – Doubles =

Doubles
- 2019 Jerusalem Volvo Open

Final
- Champions: (Uruguay) Ariel Behar (Ecuador) Gonzalo Escobar
- Runners-up: (United States) Evan King (Italy) Julian Ocleppo
- Score: 6–4, 7–6^{(7–5)}

Events
Singles	Doubles
- Jerusalem Volvo Open

This was the first edition of the tournament.

Ariel Behar and Gonzalo Escobar won the title after defeating Evan King and Julian Ocleppo 6–4, 7–6^{(7–5)} in the final.

== Seeds ==
1. (United States) James Cerretani / (Venezuela) Luis David Martínez (quarterfinals)
2. (Australia) John-Patrick Smith / (Netherlands) Sem Verbeek (first round)
3. (Israel) Jonathan Erlich / (Canada) Adil Shamasdin (first round)
4. (Switzerland) Luca Margaroli / (Italy) Andrea Vavassori (semifinals)

== Draw ==
Key

- Q = Qualifier
- WC = Wild card
- LL = Lucky loser
- Alt = Alternate
- ITF = ITF entry
- PR = Protected ranking
- SR = Special ranking
- SE = Special exempt
- JE = Junior exempt
- JR = Junior Accelerator Programme entrant
- CO = College Accelerator Programme entrant
- NG = Next Gen Accelerator Program entrant
- w/o = Walkover
- r = Retired
- d = Defaulted

First round
1	(United States) J Cerretani (Venezuela) LD Martínez	6	6
(Spain) D Marrero (Brazil) F Romboli	1	4
(India) S Myneni (Portugal) G Oliveira	0	3
(United States) E King (Italy) J Ocleppo	6	6
3	(Israel) J Erlich (Canada) A Shamasdin	6^{3}	6	[2]
(Poland) K Drzewiecki (Poland) S Walków	7^{7}	4	[10]
ITF	(France) Tom Jomby (France) A Rinderknech	3	4
WC	(Turkey) T Altuna (Serbia) D Petrović	6	6
WC	(Israel) Y Oliel (Israel) Or Ram-Harel	4	5
(Canada) F Peliwo (Canada) B Schnur	6	7
ITF	(Zimbabwe) B Lock (Zimbabwe) CJ Lock	2	3
4	(Switzerland) L Margaroli (Italy) A Vavassori	6	6
WC	(Israel) E Leshem (France) G Sakharov	2	6	[10]
(Finland) H Heliövaara (United States) A Lawson	6	4	[8]
(Uruguay) A Behar (Ecuador) G Escobar	6	6
2	(Australia) J-P Smith (Netherlands) S Verbeek	4	4

Quarterfinals
1	(United States) J Cerretani (Venezuela) LD Martínez	7	3	[9]
(United States) E King (Italy) J Ocleppo	5	6	[11]
(Poland) K Drzewiecki (Poland) S Walków	7	3	[14]
WC	(Turkey) T Altuna (Serbia) D Petrović	5	6	[16]
(Canada) F Peliwo (Canada) B Schnur	5	6	[7]
4	(Switzerland) L Margaroli (Italy) A Vavassori	7	4	[10]
WC	(Israel) E Leshem (France) G Sakharov	0	3
(Uruguay) A Behar (Ecuador) G Escobar	6	6

Semifinals
(United States) E King (Italy) J Ocleppo	6	6
WC	(Turkey) T Altuna (Serbia) D Petrović	1	4
4	(Switzerland) L Margaroli (Italy) A Vavassori	4	6	[4]
(Uruguay) A Behar (Ecuador) G Escobar	6	3	[10]

Final
(United States) E King (Italy) J Ocleppo	4	6^{5}
(Uruguay) A Behar (Ecuador) G Escobar	6	7^{7}
