= 2018 Knoxville Challenger – Singles =

Singles
- 2018 Knoxville Challenger

Final
- Champion: (United States) Reilly Opelka
- Runner-up: (United States) Bjorn Fratangelo
- Score: 7–5, 4–6, 7–6^{(7–2)}

Events
Singles	Doubles
- Knoxville Challenger

Filip Peliwo was the defending champion but chose not to defend his title.

Reilly Opelka won the title after defeating Bjorn Fratangelo 7–5, 4–6, 7–6^{(7–2)} in the final.

== Seeds ==
1. (United States) Tennys Sandgren (second round)
2. (Spain) Marcel Granollers (first round)
3. (United States) Bradley Klahn (second round)
4. (United States) Michael Mmoh (quarterfinals, withdrew)
5. (United States) Tim Smyczek (quarterfinals)
6. (Chinese Taipei) Jason Jung (second round)
7. (Canada) Peter Polansky (second round)
8. (United States) Reilly Opelka (champion)

== Draw ==
Key

- Q = Qualifier
- WC = Wild card
- LL = Lucky loser
- Alt = Alternate
- ITF = ITF entry
- PR = Protected ranking
- SR = Special ranking
- SE = Special exempt
- JE = Junior exempt
- JR = Junior Accelerator Programme entrant
- CO = College Accelerator Programme entrant
- NG = Next Gen Accelerator Program entrant
- w/o = Walkover
- r = Retired
- d = Defaulted

=== Finals ===
Semifinals
(Serbia) Nikola Milojević	3	4
8	(United States) Reilly Opelka	6	6
(United States) Christopher Eubanks	6^{4}	4
(United States) Bjorn Fratangelo	7^{7}	6

Final
8	(United States) Reilly Opelka	7	4	7^{7}
(United States) Bjorn Fratangelo	5	6	6^{2}

=== Top half ===
First round
1/WC	(United States) T Sandgren	6	6
(Switzerland) H Laaksonen	3	0
(Ecuador) R Quiroz	6^{4}	4
(Slovenia) B Rola	7^{7}	6
(Croatia) N Serdarušić	2	4
(Serbia) N Milojević	6	6
WC	(Germany) Timo Stodder	1	3
6	(Chinese Taipei) J Jung	6	6
4	(United States) M Mmoh	6	6
Q	(United States) Evan Song	2	3
Q	(Sweden) M Ymer	6	6
(Poland) K Majchrzak	4	4
Q	(United States) Mi Redlicki	7^{7}	6
(El Salvador) M Arévalo	6^{5}	4
Q	(Ecuador) E Gómez	2	3
8	(United States) R Opelka	6	6

Second round
1/WC	(United States) T Sandgren	4	4
(Slovenia) B Rola	6	6
(Serbia) N Milojević	6	6
6	(Chinese Taipei) J Jung	0	4
4	(United States) M Mmoh	6	6
Q	(Sweden) M Ymer	3	2
Q	(United States) Mi Redlicki	6^{10}	6^{6}
8	(United States) R Opelka	7^{12}	7^{8}

Quarterfinals
(Slovenia) B Rola	4	2
(Serbia) N Milojević	6	6
4	(United States) M Mmoh
8	(United States) R Opelka	w/o

Semifinals
(Serbia) N Milojević	3	4
8	(United States) R Opelka	6	6

=== Bottom half ===
First round
7	(Canada) P Polansky	6	6
Alt	(United States) C Harrison	2	2
(United States) C Eubanks	7	6^{3}	6
WC	(United States) J. J. Wolf	5	7^{7}	4
WC	(United States) Preston Touliatos	3	2
(Russia) E Karlovskiy	6	6
(United States) JC Aragone	2	6^{7}
3	(United States) B Klahn	6	7^{9}
5	(United States) T Smyczek	3	6	6
(Australia) J-P Smith	6	3	2
(Germany) D Köpfer	6	2	6
Alt	(United States) M Krueger	1	6	2
SE	(United States) T Paul	4	4
(United States) B Fratangelo	6	6
(Germany) T Kamke	6	3	6
2	(Spain) M Granollers	4	6	4

Second round
7	(Canada) P Polansky	3	4
(United States) C Eubanks	6	6
(Russia) E Karlovskiy	5	6	6
3	(United States) B Klahn	7	4	4
5	(United States) T Smyczek	6	7^{7}
(Germany) D Köpfer	4	6^{4}
(United States) B Fratangelo	7^{7}	6^{4}	6
(Germany) T Kamke	6^{4}	7^{7}	4

Quarterfinals
(United States) C Eubanks	4
(Russia) E Karlovskiy	1^{r}
5	(United States) T Smyczek	2	1
(United States) B Fratangelo	6	6

Semifinals
(United States) C Eubanks	6^{4}	4
(United States) B Fratangelo	7^{7}	6
