= 2021 Knoxville Challenger – Doubles =

Doubles
- 2021 Knoxville Challenger

Final
- Champions: (Tunisia) Malek Jaziri (Slovenia) Blaž Rola
- Runners-up: (Mexico) Hans Hach Verdugo (Mexico) Miguel Ángel Reyes-Varela
- Score: 3–6, 6–3, [10–5]

Events
Singles	Doubles
← 2019 ·	Knoxville Challenger	· 2022 →

Hans Hach Verdugo and Adrián Menéndez Maceiras were the defending champions but only Hach Verdugo chose to defend his title, partnering Miguel Ángel Reyes-Varela. Hach Verdugo lost in the final to Malek Jaziri and Blaž Rola.

Jaziri and Rola won the title after defeating Hach Verdugo and Reyes-Varela 3–6, 6–3, [10–5] in the final.

== Seeds ==
1. (Mexico) Hans Hach Verdugo / (Mexico) Miguel Ángel Reyes-Varela (final)
2. (Philippines) Treat Huey / (Denmark) Frederik Nielsen (first round)
3. (United States) Evan King / (United States) Hunter Reese (semifinals)
4. (United States) Robert Galloway / (United States) Alex Lawson (quarterfinals)

== Draw ==
Key

- Q = Qualifier
- WC = Wild card
- LL = Lucky loser
- Alt = Alternate
- ITF = ITF entry
- PR = Protected ranking
- SR = Special ranking
- SE = Special exempt
- JE = Junior exempt
- JR = Junior Accelerator Programme entrant
- CO = College Accelerator Programme entrant
- NG = Next Gen Accelerator Program entrant
- w/o = Walkover
- r = Retired
- d = Defaulted

First round
1	(Mexico) H Hach Verdugo (Mexico) MÁ Reyes-Varela	6^{3}	7^{7}	[10]
WC	(United Kingdom) Emile Hudd (Japan) S Mitsui	7^{7}	6^{4}	[6]
WC	(United States) M Damm (United States) G Nanda	4	4
(Chinese Taipei) J Jung (United States) M Krueger	6	6
3	(United States) E King (United States) H Reese	7^{7}	6
Alt	(Spain) D Marrero (Japan) Y Uchiyama	6^{3}	4
(United States) C Harrison (United States) N Lammons	6^{7}	4
(United States) T Sandgren (Denmark) M Torpegaard	7^{9}	6
(India) A Kadhe (South Africa) R Roelofse	3	6	[6]
(Tunisia) M Jaziri (Slovenia) B Rola	6	4	[10]
WC	(Portugal) Martim Leote Prata (United Kingdom) J Monday	3	4
4	(United States) R Galloway (United States) A Lawson	6	6
(United States) JC Aragone (United States) D Novikov	1	3
(Philippines) R Gonzales (Indonesia) C Rungkat	6	6
(United States) W Blumberg (United States) M Schnur	7^{7}	6
2	(Philippines) T Huey (Denmark) F Nielsen	6^{3}	2

Quarterfinals
1	(Mexico) H Hach Verdugo (Mexico) MÁ Reyes-Varela	6	2	[12]
(Chinese Taipei) J Jung (United States) M Krueger	3	6	[10]
3	(United States) E King (United States) H Reese	7^{9}	4	[14]
(United States) T Sandgren (Denmark) M Torpegaard	6^{7}	6	[12]
(Tunisia) M Jaziri (Slovenia) B Rola	6	6
4	(United States) R Galloway (United States) A Lawson	2	2
(Philippines) R Gonzales (Indonesia) C Rungkat	6	7^{8}
(United States) W Blumberg (United States) M Schnur	4	6^{6}

Semifinals
1	(Mexico) H Hach Verdugo (Mexico) MÁ Reyes-Varela	6	5	[10]
3	(United States) E King (United States) H Reese	3	7	[2]
(Tunisia) M Jaziri (Slovenia) B Rola	6	6^{6}	[11]
(Philippines) R Gonzales (Indonesia) C Rungkat	3	7^{8}	[9]

Final
1	(Mexico) H Hach Verdugo (Mexico) MÁ Reyes-Varela	6	3	[5]
(Tunisia) M Jaziri (Slovenia) B Rola	3	6	[10]
