= 2019 Jerusalem Volvo Open – Singles =

Singles
- 2019 Jerusalem Volvo Open

Final
- Champion: (Serbia) Danilo Petrović
- Runner-up: (Canada) Filip Peliwo
- Score: 7–6^{(7–3)}, 6–7^{(8–10)}, 6–1

Events
Singles	Doubles
- Jerusalem Volvo Open

This was the first edition of the tournament.

Danilo Petrović won the title after defeating Filip Peliwo 7–6^{(7–3)}, 6–7^{(8–10)}, 6–1 in the final.

== Seeds ==
All seeds receive a bye into the second round.

1. (Canada) Brayden Schnur (semifinals)
2. (Australia) John-Patrick Smith (third round)
3. (Israel) Dudi Sela (second round)
4. (India) Saketh Myneni (semifinals)
5. (United States) Thai-Son Kwiatkowski (second round)
6. (Portugal) Gonçalo Oliveira (second round)
7. (France) Gleb Sakharov (second round)
8. (Netherlands) Scott Griekspoor (third round)
9. (Canada) Filip Peliwo (final)
10. (United States) Collin Altamirano (second round)
11. (Turkey) Cem İlkel (withdrew)
12. (Chinese Taipei) Yang Tsung-hua (second round)
13. (Russia) Pavel Kotov (second round)
14. (India) Sasikumar Mukund (quarterfinals)
15. (Spain) Roberto Ortega Olmedo (third round)
16. (France) Tak Khunn Wang (third round)

== Draw ==
Key

- Q = Qualifier
- WC = Wild card
- LL = Lucky loser
- Alt = Alternate
- ITF = ITF entry
- PR = Protected ranking
- SR = Special ranking
- SE = Special exempt
- JE = Junior exempt
- JR = Junior Accelerator Programme entrant
- CO = College Accelerator Programme entrant
- NG = Next Gen Accelerator Program entrant
- w/o = Walkover
- r = Retired
- d = Defaulted

=== Finals ===
Quarterfinals
1	(Canada) Brayden Schnur	7^{7}	6
ITF	(France) Arthur Rinderknech	6^{2}	3
(Serbia) Danilo Petrović	7	6
(Norway) Viktor Durasovic	5	3
WC	(Israel) Edan Leshem	4	3
4	(India) Saketh Myneni	6	6
9	(Canada) Filip Peliwo	6^{2}	7^{7}	6
14	(India) Sasikumar Mukund	7^{7}	6^{5}	2

Semifinals
1	(Canada) Brayden Schnur	3	2
(Serbia) Danilo Petrović	6	6
4	(India) Saketh Myneni	3	1
9	(Canada) Filip Peliwo	6	6

Final
(Serbia) Danilo Petrović	7^{7}	6^{8}	6
9	(Canada) Filip Peliwo	6^{3}	7^{10}	1

=== Top half ===
==== Section 1 ====
First round
(Austria) M Neuchrist	2	2
(Spain) Carlos Boluda-Purkiss	6	6
ITF	(Russia) A Zhurbin	2	5
ITF	(France) Baptiste Crepatte	6	7
(Italy) A Bega	6	6
WC	(Israel) Shahar Elbaz	1	0
WC	(Israel) Or Ram-Harel	1	2
ITF	(France) A Rinderknech	6	6

Second round
1	(Canada) B Schnur	6	6
(Spain) C Boluda-Purkiss	3	4
ITF	(France) B Crepatte	2	6	0^{r}
15	(Spain) R Ortega Olmedo	6	4	5
LL	(Netherlands) S Verbeek	1	0
(Italy) A Bega	6	6
ITF	(France) A Rinderknech	6	6
5	(United States) T-S Kwiatkowski	3	4

Third round
1	(Canada) B Schnur	6	6
15	(Spain) R Ortega Olmedo	3	3
(Italy) A Bega	3	7^{7}	3
ITF	(France) A Rinderknech	6	6^{5}	6

Quarterfinals
1	(Canada) B Schnur	7^{7}	6
ITF	(France) A Rinderknech	6^{2}	3

==== Section 2 ====
First round
(Israel) B Patael	4	4
(Serbia) D Petrović	6	6
ITF	(Uzbekistan) S Fayziev	5	0^{r}
ITF	(Finland) E Ruusuvuori	7	1
(Norway) V Durasovic	6	6
LL	(Israel) Yair Sarouk	3	2
(Brazil) J Menezes	6	3	6^{5}
(Russia) T Gabashvili	4	6	7^{7}

Second round
3	(Israel) D Sela	3	6^{3}
(Serbia) D Petrović	6	7^{7}
ITF	(Finland) E Ruusuvuori	7^{7}	6
13	(Russia) P Kotov	6^{3}	4
12	(Chinese Taipei) T-h Yang	6^{4}	3
(Norway) V Durasovic	7^{7}	6
(Russia) T Gabashvili	6	6
7	(France) G Sakharov	3	2

Third round
(Serbia) D Petrović	6	6
ITF	(Finland) E Ruusuvuori	3	4
(Norway) V Durasovic	3	7	6
(Russia) T Gabashvili	6	5	3

Quarterfinals
(Serbia) D Petrović	7	6
(Norway) V Durasovic	5	3

=== Bottom half ===
==== Section 3 ====
First round
(Portugal) F Ferreira Silva	2	6^{2}
(Bulgaria) D Kuzmanov	6	7^{7}
(France) Tom Jomby	2	2
WC	(Israel) E Leshem	6	6
(China) Zh Zhang	6	6
Q	(Italy) E Dalla Valle	3	2
(Argentina) R Olivo	6^{2}	4
(Italy) A Vavassori	7^{7}	6

Second round
6	(Portugal) G Oliveira	6^{4}	2
(Bulgaria) D Kuzmanov	7^{7}	6
WC	(Israel) E Leshem	1	6	6
10	(United States) C Altamirano	6	1	4
16	(France) TK Wang	6	7^{7}
(China) Zh Zhang	4	6^{5}
(Italy) A Vavassori	6^{4}	3
4	(India) S Myneni	7^{7}	6

Third round
(Bulgaria) D Kuzmanov	4	4
WC	(Israel) E Leshem	6	6
16	(France) TK Wang	4	4
4	(India) S Myneni	6	6

Quarterfinals
WC	(Israel) E Leshem	4	3
4	(India) S Myneni	6	6

==== Section 4 ====
First round
(Japan) Makoto Ochi	6	3	1
(United States) E King	3	6	6
WC	(Uzbekistan) S Fomin	1	6^{3}
(United Kingdom) B Klein	6	7^{7}
(Germany) J Härteis	3	7	2
(Ecuador) G Escobar	6	5	6
WC	(Israel) Y Oliel	6^{4}	2
Q	(Italy) J Ocleppo	7^{7}	6

Second round
8	(Netherlands) S Griekspoor	6	7^{7}
(United States) E King	4	6^{5}
(United Kingdom) B Klein	3^{r}
9	(Canada) F Peliwo	4
14	(India) S Mukund	6	6
(Ecuador) G Escobar	1	4
Q	(Italy) J Ocleppo	6^{5}	5
2	(Australia) J-P Smith	7^{7}	7

Third round
8	(Netherlands) S Griekspoor	2	2
9	(Canada) F Peliwo	6	6
14	(India) S Mukund	1	6	6
2	(Australia) J-P Smith	6	3	3

Quarterfinals
9	(Canada) F Peliwo	6^{2}	7^{7}	6
14	(India) S Mukund	7^{7}	6^{5}	2
