= Volvo Open (disambiguation) =

Volvo Open may refer to a number of sporting events sponsored by Volvo.

== Golf ==
- Volvo Open, a golf tournament held in Sweden in 1970 and 1971
- Volvo Open di Firenze, a golf tournament on the European Tour held in Italy from 1989 to 1992
- Volvo Belgian Open, a golf tournament on the European Tour held in Belgium, and sponsored by Volvo from 1987 to 1989
- Volvo China Open, a golf tournament that has been held in China since 1995
- Volvo Finnish Open, a golf tournament on the Challenge Tour held in Finland between 1988 and 2004

== Tennis ==
- Jerusalem Volvo Open, a tennis tournament on the ATP Challenger Tour held in Israel
- Swedish Open, a tennis tournament on the ATP and WTA tours held in Sweden that was known as the Volvo Open in 1988 and 1989
- Volvo Car Open, a tennis tournament on the WTA Tour held in the United States
- Volvo Monte Carlo Open, a tennis tournament on the ATP Tour held in Monaco
- Volvo Women's Open, a tennis tournament on the WTA Tour held in Thailand

== Other ==
- Volvo Open 70, a class of racing yachts designed for the Volvo Ocean Race
- Volvo Open Cup, figure skating competition held in Latvia

== See also ==
- Volvo Masters (disambiguation)
