= 2018 Knoxville Challenger – Doubles =

Doubles
- 2018 Knoxville Challenger

Final
- Champions: (Japan) Toshihide Matsui (Denmark) Frederik Nielsen
- Runners-up: (United States) Hunter Reese (United States) Tennys Sandgren
- Score: 7–6^{(8–6)}, 7–5

Events
Singles	Doubles
← 2017 ·	Knoxville Challenger	· 2019 →

Leander Paes and Purav Raja were the defending champions but only Paes chose to defend his title, partnering Miguel Ángel Reyes-Varela. Paes lost in the quarterfinals to Alex Lawson and Jackson Withrow.

Toshihide Matsui and Frederik Nielsen won the title after defeating Hunter Reese and Tennys Sandgren 7–6^{(8–6)}, 7–5 in the final.

== Seeds ==
1. (India) Leander Paes / (Mexico) Miguel Ángel Reyes-Varela (quarterfinals)
2. (El Salvador) Marcelo Arévalo / (Venezuela) Roberto Maytín (first round)
3. (Australia) Matt Reid / (Australia) John-Patrick Smith (first round)
4. (Spain) Marcel Granollers / (Netherlands) Mark Vervoort (first round)

== Draw ==
=== Key ===
- Q = Qualifier
- WC = Wild card
- LL = Lucky loser
- Alt = Alternate
- SE = Special exempt
- PR = Protected ranking
- ITF = ITF entry
- JE = Junior exempt
- w/o = Walkover
- r = Retired
- d = Defaulted
- SR = Special ranking

First round
1	(India) L Paes (Mexico) MÁ Reyes-Varela	6	6
(Mexico) H Hach Verdugo (South Africa) R Roelofse	4	2
(United States) A Lawson (United States) J Withrow	6	6
WC	(United States) JC Aragone (United States) B Fratangelo	4	4
4	(Spain) M Granollers (Netherlands) M Vervoort	4	6^{4}
(Japan) T Matsui (Denmark) F Nielsen	6	7^{7}
WC	(United States) C Eubanks (United States) M Krueger	6^{0}	4
WC	(Germany) Timo Stodder (United States) Preston Touliatos	7^{7}	6
(Canada) P Polansky (Canada) A Shamasdin	6	3	[10]
Q	(Finland) H Heliövaara (Switzerland) H Laaksonen	4	6	[2]
(Philippines) R Gonzales (United States) N Lammons	3	6	[10]
3	(Australia) M Reid (Australia) J-P Smith	6	3	[5]
(United States) H Reese (United States) T Sandgren	3	6	[10]
(Chinese Taipei) J Jung (Netherlands) S Verbeek	6	3	[8]
(United States) R Galloway (United States) N Pasha	6	3	[10]
2	(El Salvador) M Arévalo (Venezuela) R Maytín	4	6	[3]

Quarterfinals
1	(India) L Paes (Mexico) MÁ Reyes-Varela	3	4
(United States) A Lawson (United States) J Withrow	6	6
(Japan) T Matsui (Denmark) F Nielsen	6	3	[10]
WC	(Germany) T Stodder (United States) P Touliatos	2	6	[5]
(Canada) P Polansky (Canada) A Shamasdin	6^{4}	7^{7}	[10]
(Philippines) R Gonzales (United States) N Lammons	7^{7}	6^{4}	[8]
(United States) H Reese (United States) T Sandgren	6	6
(United States) R Galloway (United States) N Pasha	2	4

Semifinals
(United States) A Lawson (United States) J Withrow	7	1	[3]
(Japan) T Matsui (Denmark) F Nielsen	5	6	[10]
(Canada) P Polansky (Canada) A Shamasdin	4	2
(United States) H Reese (United States) T Sandgren	6	6

Final
(Japan) T Matsui (Denmark) F Nielsen	7^{8}	7
(United States) H Reese (United States) T Sandgren	6^{6}	5
