= 2021 Knoxville Challenger – Singles =

Singles
- 2021 Knoxville Challenger

Final
- Champion: (United States) Christopher Eubanks
- Runner-up: (Germany) Daniel Altmaier
- Score: 6–3, 6–4

Events
Singles	Doubles
← 2019 ·	Knoxville Challenger	· 2022 →

Michael Mmoh was the defending champion but lost in the semifinals to Daniel Altmaier.

Christopher Eubanks won the title after defeating Altmaier 6–3, 6–4 in the final.

== Seeds ==
1. (United States) Tennys Sandgren (first round)
2. (Germany) Daniel Altmaier (final)
3. (Canada) Vasek Pospisil (first round)
4. (United States) Mitchell Krueger (second round)
5. (United States) Jack Sock (quarterfinals)
6. (United States) J. J. Wolf (first round)
7. (Kazakhstan) Dmitry Popko (first round)
8. (United States) Bjorn Fratangelo (semifinals)

== Draw ==
=== Key ===
- Q = Qualifier
- WC = Wild card
- LL = Lucky loser
- Alt = Alternate
- SE = Special exempt
- PR = Protected ranking
- ITF = ITF entry
- JE = Junior exempt
- w/o = Walkover
- r = Retired
- d = Defaulted
- SR = Special ranking

=== Finals ===
Semifinals
8	(United States) Bjorn Fratangelo	5	5
(United States) Christopher Eubanks	7	7
(United States) Michael Mmoh	6	3	4
2	(Germany) Daniel Altmaier	3	6	6

Final
(United States) Christopher Eubanks	6	6
2	(Germany) Daniel Altmaier	3	4

=== Top half ===
First round
1	(United States) T Sandgren	6	6^{3}	6^{4}
Alt	(Canada) P Polansky	3	7^{7}	7^{7}
WC	(United States) Em Nava	6	6
Q	(United States) D Young	3	2
Q	(Netherlands) G Brouwer	5	6	7
Q	(United States) JC Aragone	7	2	5
(Japan) Yo Watanuki	4	6^{5}
8	(United States) B Fratangelo	6	7^{7}
3	(Canada) V Pospisil	6	2	3
(United States) C Eubanks	2	6	6
(Japan) G Soeda	6	7^{8}
Alt	(Tunisia) M Jaziri	4	6^{6}
(Chinese Taipei) J Jung	6	6
(Australia) J Kubler	4	1
Alt	(United States) C Harrison	6	6
6	(United States) J. J. Wolf	2	3

Second round
Alt	(Canada) P Polansky	6	6^{2}	0^{r}
WC	(United States) Em Nava	2	7^{7}	0
Q	(Netherlands) G Brouwer	3	6	3
8	(United States) B Fratangelo	6	3	6
(United States) C Eubanks	6	2	7^{7}
(Japan) G Soeda	3	6	6^{4}
(Chinese Taipei) J Jung	6	6^{3}	2^{r}
Alt	(United States) C Harrison	3	7^{7}	4

Quarterfinals
WC	(United States) Em Nava	4	4
8	(United States) B Fratangelo	6	6
(United States) C Eubanks	6	7^{11}
Alt	(United States) C Harrison	3	6^{9}

Semifinals
8	(United States) B Fratangelo	5	5
(United States) C Eubanks	7	7

=== Bottom half ===
First round
7	(Kazakhstan) D Popko	4	5
Q	(United Kingdom) A McHugh	6	7
(Australia) A Vukic	3	6	5
(United States) S Kozlov	6	4	7
(Japan) Y Uchiyama	5	3
(United States) M Mmoh	7	6
PR	(Japan) T Ito	6^{4}	3
4	(United States) M Krueger	7^{7}	6
5	(United States) J Sock	7^{7}	7
WC	(United States) A Kovacevic	6^{4}	5
(India) P Gunneswaran	6	7^{7}
(Denmark) M Torpegaard	2	6^{2}
(Slovenia) B Rola	6	7^{7}
(United States) T-S Kwiatkowski	3	6^{5}
WC	(Australia) A Walton	3	2
2	(Germany) D Altmaier	6	6

Second round
Q	(United Kingdom) A McHugh	6	6
(United States) S Kozlov	4	4
(United States) M Mmoh	7^{7}	1	6
4	(United States) M Krueger	6^{4}	6	2
5	(United States) J Sock	6	7^{7}
(India) P Gunneswaran	3	6^{1}
(Slovenia) B Rola	6^{3}	4
2	(Germany) D Altmaier	7^{7}	6

Quarterfinals
Q	(United Kingdom) A McHugh	6	3	1
(United States) M Mmoh	3	6	6
5	(United States) J Sock	6	5	6^{2}
2	(Germany) D Altmaier	3	7	7^{7}

Semifinals
(United States) M Mmoh	6	3	4
2	(Germany) D Altmaier	3	6	6
