= 2017 Knoxville Challenger =

- Date: 7–12 November
- Edition: 14th
- Surface: Hard
- Location: Knoxville, United States

Champions

Singles
- (Canada) Filip Peliwo

Doubles
- (India) Leander Paes / (India) Purav Raja
← 2016 ·	Knoxville Challenger	· 2018 →

The 2017 Knoxville Challenger was a professional tennis tournament played on indoor hard courts. It was the fourteenth edition of the tournament which was part of the 2017 ATP Challenger Tour. It took place in Knoxville, United States between 7 and 12 November 2017.

== Singles main-draw entrants ==
=== Seeds ===
Country	Player	Rank^{1}	Seed
USA	Tennys Sandgren	96	1
SUI	Henri Laaksonen	97	2
USA	Taylor Fritz	105	3
GBR	Cameron Norrie	113	4
USA	Bjorn Fratangelo	118	5
USA	Stefan Kozlov	135	6
USA	Michael Mmoh	150	7
USA	Tommy Paul	159	8

- ^{1} Rankings are as of October 30, 2017.

=== Other entrants ===
The following players received wildcards into the singles main draw:

- (United States) Jared Hiltzik
- (United States) Ronnie Schneider
- (Germany) Timo Stodder
- (Colombia) Luis Valero

The following player received entry into the singles main draw using a protected ranking:

- (United States) Bradley Klahn

The following player received entry into the singles main draw as an alternate:

- (United States) Dennis Novikov

The following players received entry from the qualifying draw:

- (Germany) Mats Moraing
- (Denmark) Frederik Nielsen
- (Canada) Filip Peliwo
- (United Kingdom) Alexander Ward

The following player received entry as a lucky loser:

- (United Kingdom) Edward Corrie

== Champions ==
=== Singles ===
- (Canada) Filip Peliwo def. (United States) Denis Kudla 6–4, 6–2.

=== Doubles ===
(India) Leander Paes / (India) Purav Raja def. (United States) James Cerretani / (Australia) John-Patrick Smith 7–6^{(7–4)}, 7–6^{(7–4)}.
