= 2018 Knoxville Challenger =

- Date: 5–11 November
- Edition: 15th
- Surface: Hard
- Location: Knoxville, United States

Champions

Singles
- (United States) Reilly Opelka

Doubles
- (Japan) Toshihide Matsui / (Denmark) Frederik Nielsen
← 2017 ·	Knoxville Challenger	· 2019 →

The 2018 Knoxville Challenger was a professional tennis tournament played on indoor hard courts. It was the fifteenth edition of the tournament which was part of the 2018 ATP Challenger Tour. It took place in Knoxville, United States between 5 and 11 November 2018.

== Singles main-draw entrants ==
=== Seeds ===
Country	Player	Rank^{1}	Seed
USA	Tennys Sandgren	62	1
ESP	Marcel Granollers	98	2
USA	Bradley Klahn	101	3
USA	Michael Mmoh	102	4
USA	Tim Smyczek	120	5
TPE	Jason Jung	126	6
CAN	Peter Polansky	130	7
USA	Reilly Opelka	134	8

- ^{1} Rankings are as of October 29, 2018.

=== Other entrants ===
The following players received wildcards into the singles main draw:

- (United States) Tennys Sandgren
- (Germany) Timo Stodder
- (United States) Preston Touliatos
- (United States) J. J. Wolf

The following player received entry into the singles main draw as a special exempt:

- (United States) Tommy Paul

The following players received entry into the singles main draw as alternates:

- (United States) Christian Harrison
- (United States) Mitchell Krueger

The following players received entry from the qualifying draw:

- (Ecuador) Emilio Gómez
- (United States) Michael Redlicki
- (United States) Evan Song
- (Sweden) Mikael Ymer

== Champions ==
=== Singles ===
- (United States) Reilly Opelka def. (United States) Bjorn Fratangelo 7–5, 4–6, 7–6^{(7–2)}.

=== Doubles ===
- (Japan) Toshihide Matsui / (Denmark) Frederik Nielsen def. (United States) Hunter Reese / (United States) Tennys Sandgren 7–6^{(8–6)}, 7–5.
