= Volvo Masters (disambiguation) =

Several golf tournaments have been sponsored by Volvo and titled as the Volvo Masters:

- Volvo Asian Masters, held in Taiwan in 1995.
- Volvo Masters, part of the European Tour from 1988 to 2008.
- Volvo Masters of Asia, replacing the Volvo Masters of Malaysia, an Asian Tour event held from 2002 to 2008.
- Volvo Masters of Latin America, a South American Tour event held in Brazil in 1996
- Volvo Masters of Malaysia, held from 1994 to 2001, and an Asian Tour event from 1997.
- Volvo Masters of Thailand, held in 1995 and 1996.

Other sporting events to carry the name Volvo Masters include:

- ATP Finals, a tennis tournament on the ATP Tour, known as the Volvo Masters between 1980 and 1984.

== See also ==
- Volvo Open (disambiguation)
