= 2019 Knoxville Challenger – Singles =

Singles
- 2019 Knoxville Challenger

Final
- Champion: (United States) Michael Mmoh
- Runner-up: (Australia) Christopher O'Connell
- Score: 6–4, 6–4

Events
Singles	Doubles
- Knoxville Challenger

Reilly Opelka was the defending champion but chose not to defend his title.

Michael Mmoh won the title after defeating Christopher O'Connell 6–4, 6–4 in the final.

== Seeds ==
All seeds receive a bye into the second round.

1. (United States) Tommy Paul (semifinals)
2. (Canada) Brayden Schnur (second round)
3. (United States) Bradley Klahn (second round)
4. (Japan) Taro Daniel (second round)
5. (United States) Denis Kudla (second round)
6. (Italy) Paolo Lorenzi (second round)
7. (United States) Marcos Giron (second round)
8. (Australia) Christopher O'Connell (final)
9. (Slovenia) Blaž Rola (quarterfinals)
10. (Ecuador) Emilio Gómez (third round)
11. (Canada) Peter Polansky (third round)
12. (Barbados) Darian King (second round)
13. (Canada) Vasek Pospisil (third round, retired)
14. (France) Maxime Janvier (withdrew)
15. (Russia) Alexey Vatutin (second round)
16. (United States) Mitchell Krueger (second round)

== Draw ==
Key

- Q = Qualifier
- WC = Wild card
- LL = Lucky loser
- Alt = Alternate
- ITF = ITF entry
- PR = Protected ranking
- SR = Special ranking
- SE = Special exempt
- JE = Junior exempt
- JR = Junior Accelerator Programme entrant
- CO = College Accelerator Programme entrant
- NG = Next Gen Accelerator Program entrant
- w/o = Walkover
- r = Retired
- d = Defaulted

=== Finals ===
Quarterfinals
1	(United States) Tommy Paul	2	6	7^{7}
9	(Slovenia) Blaž Rola	6	1	6^{4}
(United States) Ernesto Escobedo	7^{7}	4	4
8	(Australia) Christopher O'Connell	6^{2}	6	6
(United States) Michael Mmoh	6	6
WC	(United States) Aleksandar Kovacevic	4	3
(United Kingdom) Liam Broady	6	1	6
(Netherlands) Gijs Brouwer	3	6	3

Semifinals
1	(United States) Tommy Paul	6^{3}	3
8	(Australia) Christopher O'Connell	7^{7}	6
(United States) Michael Mmoh	6	7^{7}
(United Kingdom) Liam Broady	2	6^{5}

Final
8	(Australia) Christopher O'Connell	4	4
(United States) Michael Mmoh	6	6

=== Top half ===
==== Section 1 ====
First round
(United States) E King	5	6	6
WC	(United States) Nathan Ponwith	7	4	2
(United States) S Korda	6^{7}	7	6
(United Kingdom) R Peniston	7^{9}	5	0
Q	(Italy) A Vavassori	7^{13}	6
(United States) Mi Redlicki	6^{11}	2
(Ecuador) R Quiroz	7^{12}	2	3
(Kazakhstan) D Popko	6^{10}	6	6

Second round
1	(United States) T Paul	6	6^{10}	7^{7}
(United States) E King	2	7^{12}	6^{1}
(United States) S Korda	4	4
13	(Canada) V Pospisil	6	6
9	(Slovenia) B Rola	6	6
Q	(Italy) A Vavassori	3	4
(Kazakhstan) D Popko	4	6	6
6	(Italy) P Lorenzi	6	2	4

Third round
1	(United States) T Paul	6	0
13	(Canada) V Pospisil	4	0^{r}
9	(Slovenia) B Rola	6	6
(Kazakhstan) D Popko	4	4

Quarterfinals
1	(United States) T Paul	2	6	7^{7}
9	(Slovenia) B Rola	6	1	6^{4}

==== Section 2 ====
First round
(Spain) A Menéndez Maceiras	6	3	2
(United States) J. J. Wolf	2	6	6
(United States) JC Aragone	6^{12}	6^{4}
(United States) E Escobedo	7^{14}	7^{7}
(Slovenia) B Kavčič	2	6^{2}
(Israel) E Leshem	6	7^{7}
(United States) K King	6	6
(United Kingdom) E Hoyt	1	4

Second round
4	(Japan) T Daniel	6^{6}	4
(United States) J. J. Wolf	7^{8}	6
(United States) E Escobedo	5	7	6
15	(Russia) A Vatutin	7	5	3
11	(Canada) P Polansky	6	7
(Israel) E Leshem	2	5
(United States) K King	5	3
8	(Australia) C O'Connell	7	6

Third round
(United States) J. J. Wolf	3	2
(United States) E Escobedo	6	6
11	(Canada) P Polansky	2	3
8	(Australia) C O'Connell	6	6

Quarterfinals
(United States) E Escobedo	7^{7}	4	4
8	(Australia) C O'Connell	6^{2}	6	6

=== Bottom half ===
==== Section 3 ====
First round
(United States) Roy Smith	6	3	6
WC	(Australia) Scott Jones	3	6	4
(Dominican Republic) R Cid Subervi	1	2
(United States) M Mmoh	6	6
Q	(United States) S Kirchheimer	2	7^{11}	3
(United States) S Bangoura	6	6^{9}	6
WC	(United States) A Kovacevic	7	7
(Japan) K Uchida	5	5

Second round
5	(United States) D Kudla	6^{5}	2
(United States) R Smith	7^{7}	6
(United States) M Mmoh	6	2	6
12	(Barbados) D King	3	6	0
16	(United States) M Krueger	6	6^{4}	4
(United States) S Bangoura	3	7^{7}	6
WC	(United States) A Kovacevic	3	7^{9}	6
3	(United States) B Klahn	6	6^{7}	4

Third round
(United States) R Smith	4	2
(United States) M Mmoh	6	6
(United States) S Bangoura	4	6	4
WC	(United States) A Kovacevic	6	4	6

Quarterfinals
(United States) M Mmoh	6	6
WC	(United States) A Kovacevic	4	3

==== Section 4 ====
First round
(United Kingdom) L Broady	7^{7}	6
(United States) D Young	6^{5}	3
(United States) A Ritschard	4	7^{7}	6
WC	(United States) Z Svajda	6	6^{4}	3
WC	(United States) B Nakashima	6	6
(Canada) F Peliwo	2	2
(Netherlands) G Brouwer	6	6
(Netherlands) J Sels	3	2

Second round
7	(United States) M Giron	6	6^{3}	5
(United Kingdom) L Broady	2	7^{7}	7
(United States) A Ritschard	6	1	2
10	(Ecuador) E Gómez	3	6	6
LL	(United Kingdom) L Glasspool	6^{5}	6	6^{5}
WC	(United States) B Nakashima	7^{7}	3	7^{7}
(Netherlands) G Brouwer	7	6
2	(Canada) B Schnur	5	3

Third round
(United Kingdom) L Broady	7	5	7
10	(Ecuador) E Gómez	5	7	5
WC	(United States) B Nakashima	2	3
(Netherlands) G Brouwer	6	6

Quarterfinals
(United Kingdom) L Broady	6	1	6
(Netherlands) G Brouwer	3	6	3
