= 2017 Knoxville Challenger – Doubles =

Doubles
- 2017 Knoxville Challenger

Final
- Champions: (India) Leander Paes (India) Purav Raja
- Runners-up: (United States) James Cerretani (Australia) John-Patrick Smith
- Score: 7–6^{(7–4)}, 7–6^{(7–4)}

Events
Singles	Doubles
← 2016 ·	Knoxville Challenger	· 2018 →

Peter Polansky and Adil Shamasdin were the defending champions but chose not to defend their title.

Leander Paes and Purav Raja won the title after defeating James Cerretani and John-Patrick Smith 7–6^{(7–4)}, 7–6^{(7–4)} in the final.

== Seeds ==
1. (India) Leander Paes / (India) Purav Raja (champions)
2. (United States) James Cerretani / (Australia) John-Patrick Smith (final)
3. (South Africa) Ruan Roelofse / (United Kingdom) Joe Salisbury (semifinals)
4. (United Kingdom) Luke Bambridge / (Republic of Ireland) David O'Hare (first round)

== Draw ==
=== Key ===
- Q = Qualifier
- WC = Wild card
- LL = Lucky loser
- Alt = Alternate
- SE = Special exempt
- PR = Protected ranking
- ITF = ITF entry
- JE = Junior exempt
- w/o = Walkover
- r = Retired
- d = Defaulted
- SR = Special ranking

First round
1	(India) L Paes (India) P Raja	6	6
(United States) K King (United States) B Klahn	2	4
(Barbados) D King (United States) M Mmoh	0^{r}
(United Kingdom) L Broady (United Kingdom) M Willis	3
3	(South Africa) R Roelofse (United Kingdom) J Salisbury	7^{8}	7
(Mexico) H Hach Verdugo (United States) D Novikov	6^{6}	5
(United States) M McDonald (United States) T Paul	6	6
WC	(South Africa) N Scholtz (Colombia) Luis Valero	3	4
(United States) N Lammons (United States) A Lawson	6	3	[6]
WC	(United States) T Fritz (United States) Jared Hiltzik	4	6	[10]
(Venezuela) R Maytín (United Kingdom) C Norrie	7^{10}	6
4	(United Kingdom) L Bambridge (Republic of Ireland) D O'Hare	6^{8}	3
WC	(Germany) Timo Stodder (United States) Preston Touliatos	3	3
(Australia) Jarryd Chaplin (United States) M Krueger	6	6
Q	(Germany) D Köpfer (Germany) M Moraing	3	6	[5]
2	(United States) J Cerretani (Australia) J-P Smith	6	3	[10]

Quarterfinals
1	(India) L Paes (India) P Raja	7	6
(United Kingdom) L Broady (United Kingdom) M Willis	5	0
3	(South Africa) R Roelofse (United Kingdom) J Salisbury	6	6
(United States) M McDonald (United States) T Paul	4	1
WC	(United States) T Fritz (United States) J Hiltzik	4	3
(Venezuela) R Maytín (United Kingdom) C Norrie	6	6
(Australia) J Chaplin (United States) M Krueger	2	5
2	(United States) J Cerretani (Australia) J-P Smith	6	7

Semifinals
1	(India) L Paes (India) P Raja	7^{7}	6
3	(South Africa) R Roelofse (United Kingdom) J Salisbury	6^{4}	3
(Venezuela) R Maytín (United Kingdom) C Norrie	4	2
2	(United States) J Cerretani (Australia) J-P Smith	6	6

Final
1	(India) L Paes (India) P Raja	7^{7}	7^{7}
2	(United States) J Cerretani (Australia) J-P Smith	6^{4}	6^{4}
