= 2019 Knoxville Challenger =

- Date: 4–10 November
- Edition: 16th
- Surface: Hard
- Location: Knoxville, United States

Champions

Singles
- (United States) Michael Mmoh

Doubles
- (Mexico) Hans Hach Verdugo / (Spain) Adrián Menéndez Maceiras
← 2018 ·	Knoxville Challenger	· 2021 →

The 2019 Knoxville Challenger was a professional tennis tournament played on indoor hard courts. It was the sixteenth edition of the tournament which was part of the 2019 ATP Challenger Tour. It took place in Knoxville, United States between 4 and 10 November 2019.

== Singles main-draw entrants ==
=== Seeds ===
Country	Player	Rank^{1}	Seed
USA	Tommy Paul	80	1
CAN	Brayden Schnur	99	2
USA	Bradley Klahn	100	3
JPN	Taro Daniel	110	4
USA	Denis Kudla	111	5
ITA	Paolo Lorenzi	117	6
USA	Marcos Giron	125	7
AUS	Christopher O'Connell	139	8
SLO	Blaž Rola	140	9
ECU	Gómez	144	10
CAN	Peter Polansky	159	11
BAR	Darian King	169	12
CAN	Vasek Pospisil	174	13
~~FRA~~	~~Maxime Janvier~~	~~187~~	~~14~~
RUS	Alexey Vatutin	197	15
USA	Mitchell Krueger	201	16

- ^{1} Rankings are as of October 28, 2019.

=== Other entrants ===
The following players received wildcards into the singles main draw:

- (Australia) Scott Jones
- (United States) Aleksandar Kovacevic
- (United States) Brandon Nakashima
- (United States) Nathan Ponwith
- (United States) Zachary Svajda

The following players received entry from the qualifying draw:

- (United States) Strong Kirchheimer
- (Italy) Andrea Vavassori

The following player received entry as a lucky loser:

- (United Kingdom) Lloyd Glasspool

== Champions ==
=== Singles ===
- (United States) Michael Mmoh def. (Australia) Christopher O'Connell 6–4, 6–4.

=== Doubles ===
- (Mexico) Hans Hach Verdugo / (Spain) Adrián Menéndez Maceiras def. (United States) Bradley Klahn / (Netherlands) Sem Verbeek 7–6^{(8–6)}, 4–6, [10–5].
