= 2019 Jerusalem Volvo Open =

- Date: 20–26 May
- Edition: 1st
- Draw: 48S / 4Q / 16D
- Surface: Hard
- Location: Jerusalem

Champions

Singles
- (Serbia) Danilo Petrović

Doubles
- (Uruguay) Ariel Behar / (Ecuador) Gonzalo Escobar
- Jerusalem Volvo Open

The 2019 Jerusalem Volvo Open was a professional tennis tournament played on hard courts. It was the first edition of the tournament which was part of the 2019 ATP Challenger Tour. It took place in Jerusalem, between 20 and 26 May 2019.

== Singles main-draw entrants ==
=== Seeds ===
Country	Player	Rank^{1}	Seed
CAN	Brayden Schnur	115	1
AUS	John-Patrick Smith	227	2
ISR	Dudi Sela	240	3
IND	Saketh Myneni	246	4
USA	Thai-Son Kwiatkowski	250	5
POR	Gonçalo Oliveira	265	6
FRA	Gleb Sakharov	267	7
NED	Scott Griekspoor	268	8
CAN	Filip Peliwo	272	9
USA	Collin Altamirano	279	10
~~TUR~~	~~Cem İlkel~~	~~281~~	~~11~~
TPE	Yang Tsung-hua	290	12
RUS	Pavel Kotov	297	13
IND	Sasikumar Mukund	299	14
ESP	Roberto Ortega Olmedo	300	15
FRA	Tak Khunn Wang	322	16

- ^{1} Rankings are as of 13 May 2019.

=== Other entrants ===
The following players received wildcards into the singles main draw:

- (Israel) Shahar Elbaz
- (Uzbekistan) Sergey Fomin
- (Israel) Edan Leshem
- (Israel) Yshai Oliel
- (Israel) Or Ram-Harel

The following players received entry into the singles main draw using their ITF World Tennis Ranking:

- (France) Baptiste Crepatte
- (Uzbekistan) Sanjar Fayziev
- (France) Arthur Rinderknech
- (Finland) Emil Ruusuvuori
- (Russia) Alexander Zhurbin

The following players received entry from the qualifying draw:

- (Italy) Enrico Dalla Valle
- (Italy) Julian Ocleppo

The following players received entry as lucky losers:

- (Israel) Yair Sarouk
- (Netherlands) Sem Verbeek

== Champions ==
=== Singles ===
- (Serbia) Danilo Petrović def. (Canada) Filip Peliwo 7–6^{(7–3)}, 6–7^{(8–10)}, 6–1.

=== Doubles ===
- (Uruguay) Ariel Behar / (Ecuador) Gonzalo Escobar def. (United States) Evan King / (Italy) Julian Ocleppo 6–4, 7–6^{(7–5)}.
