= 2017 Knoxville Challenger – Singles =

Singles
- 2017 Knoxville Challenger

Final
- Champion: (Canada) Filip Peliwo
- Runner-up: (United States) Denis Kudla
- Score: 6–4, 6–2

Events
Singles	Doubles
- Knoxville Challenger

Michael Mmoh was the defending champion but lost in the first round to Bradley Klahn.

Filip Peliwo won the title after defeating Denis Kudla 6–4, 6–2 in the final.

== Seeds ==
1. (United States) Tennys Sandgren (first round)
2. (Switzerland) Henri Laaksonen (semifinals)
3. (United States) Taylor Fritz (quarterfinals)
4. (United Kingdom) Cameron Norrie (first round)
5. (United States) Bjorn Fratangelo (quarterfinals)
6. (United States) Stefan Kozlov (first round)
7. (United States) Michael Mmoh (first round)
8. (United States) Tommy Paul (first round)

== Draw ==
Key

- Q = Qualifier
- WC = Wild card
- LL = Lucky loser
- Alt = Alternate
- ITF = ITF entry
- PR = Protected ranking
- SR = Special ranking
- SE = Special exempt
- JE = Junior exempt
- JR = Junior Accelerator Programme entrant
- CO = College Accelerator Programme entrant
- NG = Next Gen Accelerator Program entrant
- w/o = Walkover
- r = Retired
- d = Defaulted

=== Finals ===
Semifinals
PR	(United States) Bradley Klahn	6	2	5
(United States) Denis Kudla	2	6	7
Q	(Canada) Filip Peliwo	6	6
2	(Switzerland) Henri Laaksonen	3	0

Final
(United States) Denis Kudla	4	2
Q	(Canada) Filip Peliwo	6	6

=== Top half ===
First round
1	(United States) T Sandgren	4	6^{5}
(Australia) J-P Smith	6	7^{7}
(United States) K King	2	5
LL	(United Kingdom) E Corrie	6	7
Q	(Denmark) F Nielsen	4	6^{2}
(Barbados) D King	6	7^{7}
PR	(United States) B Klahn	1	6	6
7	(United States) M Mmoh	6	4	4
4	(United Kingdom) C Norrie	4	6	3
(United States) D Kudla	6	3	6
(United States) R Opelka	7^{9}	4	1
WC	(United States) Jared Hiltzik	6^{7}	6	6
Q	(Germany) M Moraing	6	6
Alt	(United States) D Novikov	4	2
(United States) M Krueger	4	5
5	(United States) B Fratangelo	6	7

Second round
(Australia) J-P Smith	4	7	5
LL	(United Kingdom) E Corrie	6	5	7
(Barbados) D King	6^{8}	5
PR	(United States) B Klahn	7^{10}	7
(United States) D Kudla	6	6
WC	(United States) J Hiltzik	3	4
Q	(Germany) M Moraing	4	7	2
5	(United States) B Fratangelo	6	5	6

Quarterfinals
LL	(United Kingdom) E Corrie	3	6^{3}
PR	(United States) B Klahn	6	7^{7}
(United States) D Kudla	6	3	6
5	(United States) B Fratangelo	1	6	4

Semifinals
PR	(United States) B Klahn	6	2	5
(United States) D Kudla	2	6	7

=== Bottom half ===
First round
8	(United States) T Paul	4	5
Q	(Canada) F Peliwo	6	7
WC	(Colombia) Luis Valero	0	3
(United Kingdom) L Broady	6	6
(Germany) D Köpfer	5	3
(United States) N Rubin	7	6
(United States) M McDonald	4	3
3	(United States) T Fritz	6	6
6	(United States) S Kozlov	6^{3}	2
(United States) T Smyczek	7^{7}	6
WC	(United States) R Schneider	3	5
Q	(United Kingdom) A Ward	6	7
(Canada) B Schnur	6	6
(United States) M Giron	4	3
WC	(Germany) Timo Stodder	4	4
2	(Switzerland) H Laaksonen	6	6

Second round
Q	(Canada) F Peliwo	7^{7}	4	6
(United Kingdom) L Broady	6^{3}	6	4
(United States) N Rubin	6^{5}	1
3	(United States) T Fritz	7^{7}	6
(United States) T Smyczek	6	6
Q	(United Kingdom) A Ward	4	2
(Canada) B Schnur	4	5
2	(Switzerland) H Laaksonen	6	7

Quarterfinals
Q	(Canada) F Peliwo	7^{9}	6
3	(United States) T Fritz	6^{7}	1
(United States) T Smyczek	6^{1}	4
2	(Switzerland) H Laaksonen	7^{7}	6

Semifinals
Q	(Canada) F Peliwo	6	6
2	(Switzerland) H Laaksonen	3	0
