= Jerusalem Volvo Open =

- 2019 Jerusalem Volvo Open

Defunct tennis tournament
- Event name: Jerusalem Volvo Open
- Location: Jerusalem
- Venue: ITC Jerusalem
- Category: ATP Challenger Tour
- Surface: Hard
- Draw: 48S/4Q/16D

The Jerusalem Volvo Open was a professional tennis tournament played on hard courts. It was part of the ATP Challenger Tour. It was held annually in Jerusalem since 2019.

== Past finals ==
=== Singles ===
Year	Champion	Runner-up	Score
2019	(Serbia) Danilo Petrović	(Canada) Filip Peliwo	7–6^{(7–3)}, 6–7^{(8–10)}, 6–1

=== Doubles ===
Year	Champions	Runners-up	Score
2019	(Uruguay) Ariel Behar (Ecuador) Gonzalo Escobar	(United States) Evan King (Italy) Julian Ocleppo	6–4, 7–6^{(7–5)}
