= 2019 Knoxville Challenger – Doubles =

Doubles
- 2019 Knoxville Challenger

Final
- Champions: (Mexico) Hans Hach Verdugo (Spain) Adrián Menéndez Maceiras
- Runners-up: (United States) Bradley Klahn (Netherlands) Sem Verbeek
- Score: 7–6^{(8–6)}, 4–6, [10–5]

Events
Singles	Doubles
- Knoxville Challenger

Toshihide Matsui and Frederik Nielsen were the defending champions but chose not to defend their title.

Hans Hach Verdugo and Adrián Menéndez Maceiras won the title after defeating Bradley Klahn and Sem Verbeek 7–6^{(8–6)}, 4–6, [10–5] in the final.

== Seeds ==
1. (India) Sriram Balaji / (India) Jeevan Nedunchezhiyan (first round)
2. (Philippines) Treat Huey / (United States) Jackson Withrow (first round)
3. (United States) Robert Galloway / (Venezuela) Roberto Maytín (quarterfinals)
4. (Switzerland) Luca Margaroli / (Italy) Andrea Vavassori (semifinals)

== Draw ==
Key

- Q = Qualifier
- WC = Wild card
- LL = Lucky loser
- Alt = Alternate
- ITF = ITF entry
- PR = Protected ranking
- SR = Special ranking
- SE = Special exempt
- JE = Junior exempt
- JR = Junior Accelerator Programme entrant
- CO = College Accelerator Programme entrant
- NG = Next Gen Accelerator Program entrant
- w/o = Walkover
- r = Retired
- d = Defaulted

First round
1	(India) S Balaji (India) J Nedunchezhiyan	5	4
(United States) M Giron (United States) A Lawson	7	6
WC	(United States) Andrew Rogers (United States) T Sandgren	4	7^{8}	[8]
(Mexico) H Hach Verdugo (Spain) A Menéndez Maceiras	6	6^{6}	[10]
4	(Switzerland) L Margaroli (Italy) A Vavassori	6	6
(Barbados) D King (United States) E King	2	3
(Canada) P Polansky (Canada) B Schnur	4	2
WC	(United States) S Bangoura (United States) M Mmoh	6	6
WC	(Germany) Timo Stodder (United States) Preston Touliatos	1	4
(United States) N Pasha (United States) M Schnur	6	6
(United States) JC Aragone (United States) H Reese	6^{5}	6^{7}
3	(United States) R Galloway (Venezuela) R Maytín	7^{7}	7^{9}
(United States) D Novikov (Sweden) A Siljeström	6	7^{7}
(United States) M Krueger (Slovenia) B Rola	4	6^{5}
(United States) B Klahn (Netherlands) S Verbeek	6	6
2	(Philippines) T Huey (United States) J Withrow	3	3

Quarterfinals
(United States) M Giron (United States) A Lawson	3	6	[2]
(Mexico) H Hach Verdugo (Spain) A Menéndez Maceiras	6	3	[10]
4	(Switzerland) L Margaroli (Italy) A Vavassori	6	6
WC	(United States) S Bangoura (United States) M Mmoh	3	3
(United States) N Pasha (United States) M Schnur	7^{8}	3	[11]
3	(United States) R Galloway (Venezuela) R Maytín	6^{6}	6	[9]
(United States) D Novikov (Sweden) A Siljeström	3	3
(United States) B Klahn (Netherlands) S Verbeek	6	6

Semifinals
(Mexico) H Hach Verdugo (Spain) A Menéndez Maceiras	7^{7}	7^{7}
4	(Switzerland) L Margaroli (Italy) A Vavassori	6^{3}	6^{3}
(United States) N Pasha (United States) M Schnur	2	4
(United States) B Klahn (Netherlands) S Verbeek	6	6

Final
(Mexico) H Hach Verdugo (Spain) A Menéndez Maceiras	7^{8}	4	[10]
(United States) B Klahn (Netherlands) S Verbeek	6^{6}	6	[5]
