= Filip Peliwo =

Polish tennis player

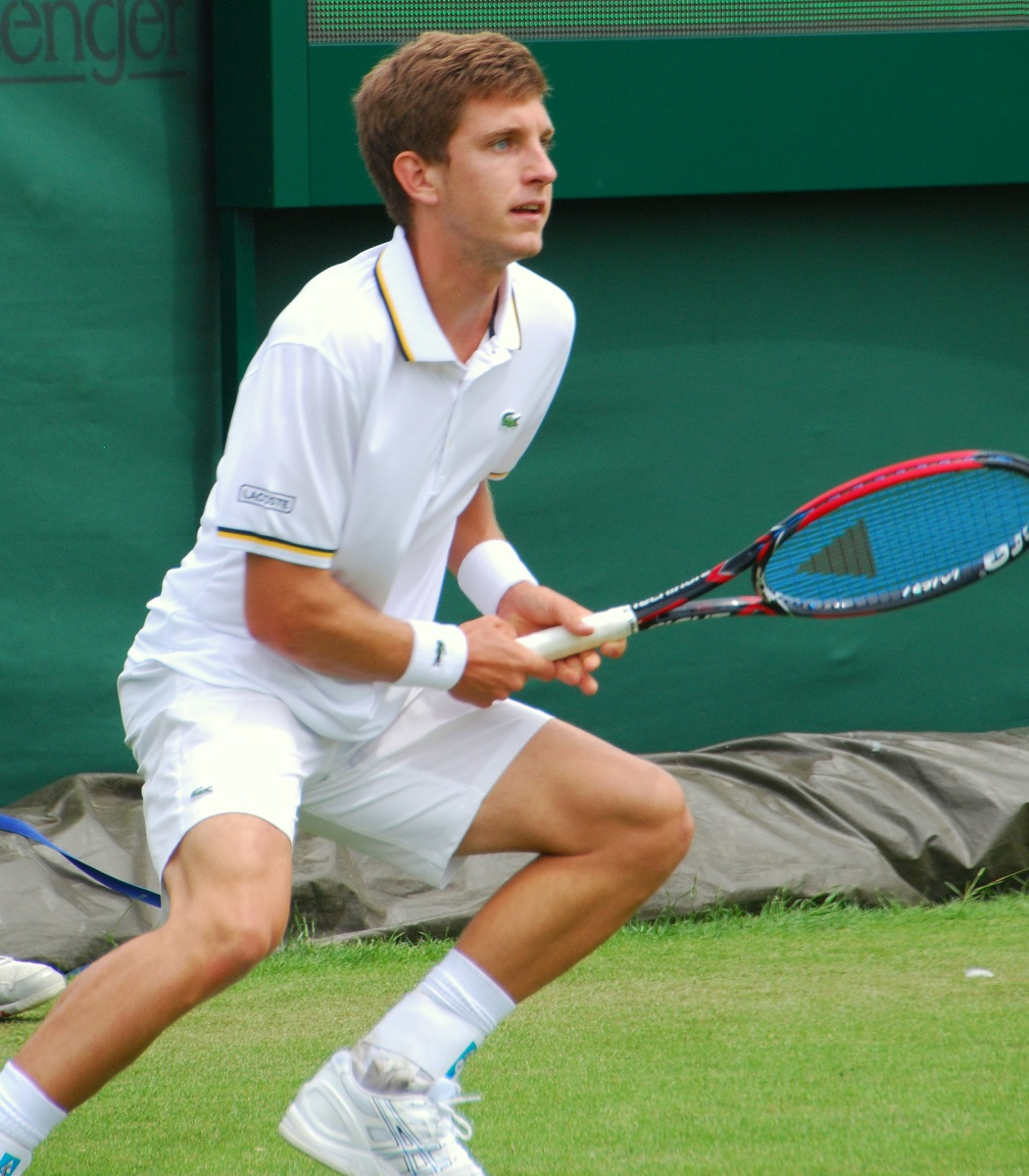
- Filip Peliwo at the 2013 Wimbledon Championships
- Country (sports): Canada; Poland (since 2022)
- Residence: North Vancouver, British Columbia, Canada
- Born: January 30, 1994 (age 32) Vancouver, BC, Canada
- Height: 1.80 m (5 ft 11 in)
- Turned pro: 2013
- Plays: Right-handed (two-handed backhand)
- Coach: Frédéric Niemeyer
- Prize money: US $444,815

Singles
- Career record: 2–6
- Career titles: 0
- Highest ranking: No. 161 (21 May 2018)
- Current ranking: No. 641 (19 October 2026)

Grand Slam singles results
- Australian Open: Q1 (2014, 2018)
- French Open: Q1 (2018)
- Wimbledon: Q2 (2013)
- US Open: Q1 (2018)

Doubles
- Career record: 0–0
- Career titles: 0
- Highest ranking: No. 321 (19 March 2018)
- Current ranking: No. 1,795 (19 October 2026)

Team competitions
- Davis Cup: 1R (2015)
- Last updated on: 19 October 2026.

Filip Peliwo (/ˈfɪlɪp ˈpɛlɪvoʊ/ FIL-ip PEL-iv-oh, Polish: [ˈfilip pɛˈlivɔ]; born January 30, 1994) is a Canadian-born Polish professional tennis player. He reached a career-high ATP singles ranking of world No. 161 on 21 May 2018 and a career-high doubles ranking of No. 321 achieved on 19 March 2018. In 2022, he began competing for Poland.

Peliwo became the first Canadian male and second Canadian ever to win a major in singles at any level with his 2012 Wimbledon boys' title win. This was Canada's second Grand Slam title in two days, one day after Eugenie Bouchard's. With the victory, Peliwo reached the No. 1 combined junior world ranking in July 2012, the first time a Canadian has been top ranked. He won his second straight junior major title at the 2012 US Open. Peliwo was also runner-up in the boys singles events at the 2012 Australian Open and French Open.

== Early life ==
Peliwo was born in Vancouver to Polish parents Mark and Monika. He played his early tennis through his teens at the North Shore Winter Club in North Vancouver BC and was part of the National Training Centre in Montreal from 2009 to 2012. He is the only one of three siblings not born in Poland.

== Tennis career ==
=== Juniors ===
Peliwo reached the semifinals of the Orange Bowl in December 2011. At the beginning of 2012, he won the Grade 1 tournament in Traralgon, Australia after beating junior world No. 1 Luke Saville. He then reached the final of the junior Australian Open, where he lost to Saville. He reached his second straight Grand Slam final at the French Open, but lost this time to Kimmer Coppejans. After reaching his third Grand Slam final in a row in 2012 at Wimbledon, Peliwo won his first Grand Slam junior title there with a win over defending champion Luke Saville. He became the second Canadian to win a junior Grand Slam singles title, following Eugenie Bouchard who the day before won the Wimbledon girls' title. Peliwo reached his fourth straight junior Grand Slam final at the US Open, where he defeated Liam Broady to win his second Grand Slam title.

As a junior, he compiled a singles win–loss record of 92–44.

Junior Grand Slam results - Singles:

Australian Open: F (2012)
French Open: F (2012)
Wimbledon: W (2012)
US Open: W (2012)

Junior Grand Slam results - Doubles:

Australian Open: QF (2012)
French Open: 1R (2011, 2012)
Wimbledon: QF (2012)
US Open: 2R (2012)

=== 2012 ===
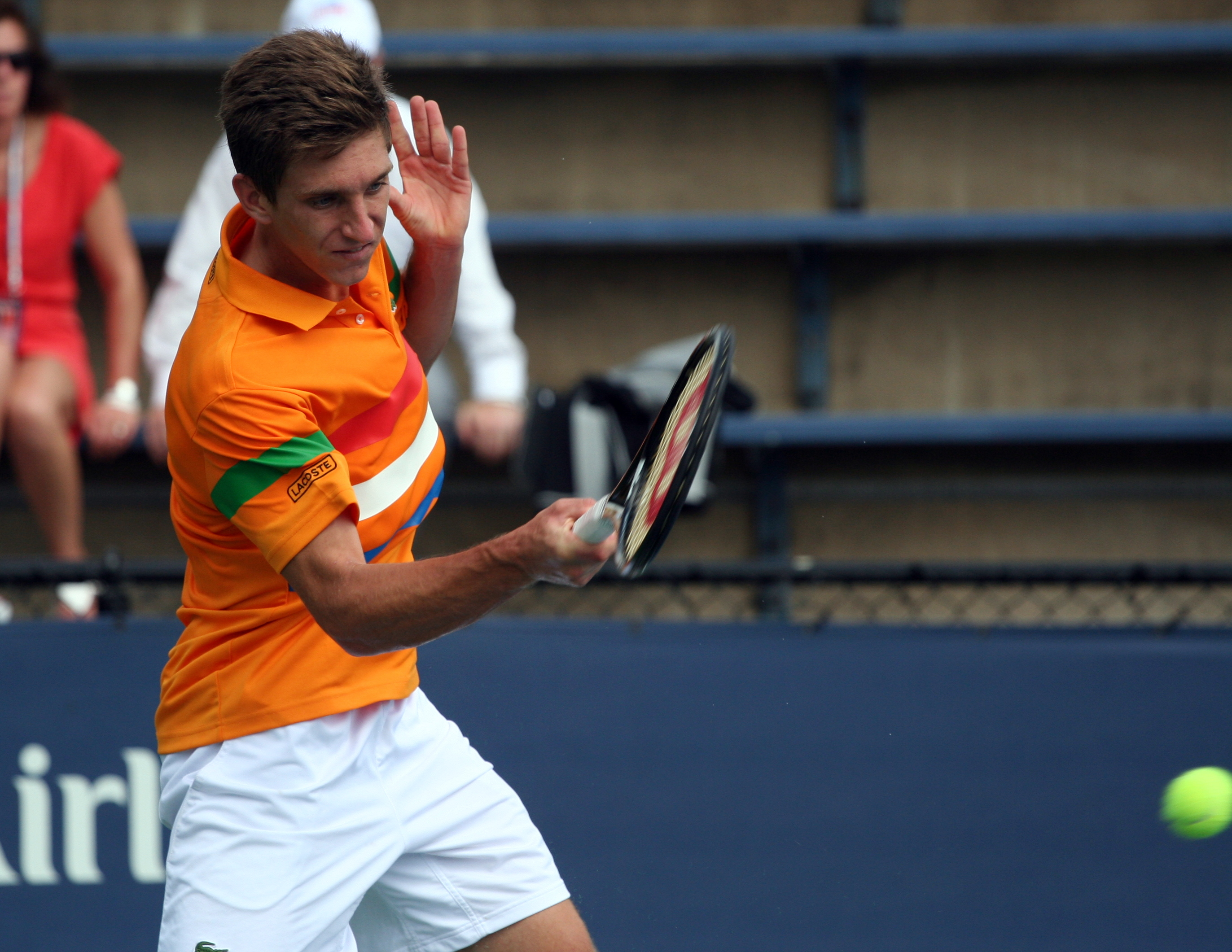
Filip Peliwo in action during the 2012 junior US Open

In March, Peliwo reached his first professional semifinal at the ATP Challenger in Rimouski, where he lost to compatriot Vasek Pospisil. In late August, Peliwo also reached the semifinals of the ITF Futures in Winnipeg, and the doubles final as well. He turned full-time professional in September, following his victory at the junior US Open. In November, Peliwo reached his first professional singles final at the ITF Futures in Mérida, but lost to fellow 18-year-old Lucas Pouille.

=== 2013 ===
In May, Peliwo reached his second doubles final but lost again, this time at the Futures in Heraklion to Joshua Milton and Andrew Whittington. He made it to his second singles final a week later at the Marathon Futures, but was defeated in three sets by Michal Konečný. As the 2012 junior champion, Peliwo was awarded a wildcard for the qualifying draw at Wimbledon. He defeated world No. 178 Bradley Klahn in the first round, but was eliminated by the sixth seed Denis Kudla in the next round. Peliwo reached the quarterfinals of the Challenger de Granby in July. The following week in Lexington, he made it to the second ATP Challenger semifinal of his career, where he was defeated by James Ward.

At the Masters 1000 Rogers Cup, at the beginning of August, Peliwo was granted a wildcard into the main draw, his first appearance at an ATP Tour tournament. He scored an upset with a three-set win over world No. 39 Jarkko Nieminen in the first round when Nieminen retired at 1–3 in the third set. He was defeated in the next round by world No. 66 Denis Istomin in three sets. He made it to the doubles final for the second straight year at the Futures in Winnipeg, but lost once again. In late September, Peliwo won his first pro title at the Futures in Markham when compatriot Philip Bester gave him a walkover in the final.

=== 2014 ===
In March, Peliwo reached the fourth professional doubles final of his career at the Futures in Gatineau. He was defeated, with compatriot Kamil Pajkowski, by Edward Corrie and Daniel Smethurst. At the Grand Prix Hassan II in April, Peliwo successfully made it through three rounds of qualifying for the first time to get a spot in an ATP tournament main draw without the use of a wildcard. He defeated world No. 80 Filippo Volandri in his opening match, but was stopped in three sets by world No. 43 Federico Delbonis in the next round. In May, he reached the semifinals in doubles of the Samarkand Challenger. At the end of June, Peliwo reached his first singles final of the season at the Futures in Richmond where he was defeated by Dennis Novikov in three sets. At the Futures in Kelowna a week later, Peliwo made it to a second straight singles final but was this time defeated by Benjamin Mitchell. In July, he was awarded a wildcard in the main draw of the Citi Open but lost to Lukáš Lacko in the opening round. In September, Peliwo reached the doubles final of the Futures in Markham where he was defeated by Matt Seeberger and Rudolf Siwy.

=== 2015–16 ===
In February 2015, Peliwo captured his second pro singles title at the Futures in Feucherolles with a straight sets victory over Antal van der Duim. Two weeks later, he won his first professional doubles title after defeating Hiroyasu Ehara and Takashi Saito with partner Pietro Licciardi in the final. In August 2015, Peliwo was awarded a wildcard for the Rogers Cup singles main draw where he was defeated by world No. 60 Sergiy Stakhovsky in the opening round in three sets. In October 2015, he won the doubles title at the ITF Futures in Rodez with Fabien Reboul.

Peliwo won his fourth singles title at the ITF Futures in Toronto in September 2016, defeating Rhyne Williams in straight sets. The next week, he won the doubles title at the Futures in Niagara-on-the-Lake with compatriot Brayden Schnur.

=== 2017 ===
In April, Peliwo captured both the singles and doubles titles at the ITF Futures in Sharm El Sheikh. Two weeks later, he won his sixth ITF title with a victory over Issam Haitham Taweel again in Sharm El Sheikh. At the end of April, Peliwo won his third ITF singles title in four weeks with a straight sets victory over Moez Echargui at the Egypt F15 in Sharm El Sheikh. He also reached the doubles final. In May, Peliwo won his fourth ITF singles title in his last six tournaments after defeating Edan Leshem in the final in Herzliya. The next week, he captured his fifth ITF singles title of the season with a straight sets victory over Dekel Bar in Netanya. He made it to the doubles final as well. In July in Kelowna, he advanced to his sixth ITF Futures final of the season but was defeated by Alexander Sarkissian. He won the doubles title with Ronnie Schneider. The next week, Peliwo captured his sixth ITF singles title of the year with a victory over Marcos Giron in Saskatoon and reached the doubles final again with Schneider. In September at the Futures in Calgary, he reached his eight singles final of the season where he was defeated by Ulises Blanch. In November, he won his first ATP Challenger title, defeating Denis Kudla at the 75K in Knoxville.

=== 2018 ===
In March, Peliwo advanced to his first ATP Challenger doubles final in Drummondville, losing to Joris De Loore and Frederik Nielsen with partner Luis David Martínez.

== ATP Challenger and ITF Tour finals ==
=== Singles: 32 (13 titles, 19 runner-ups) ===
Legend ATP Challenger Tour (1–1) ITF Futures/WTT (12–18)	Finals by surface Hard (13–17) Clay (0–2)

Result	W–L	Date	Tournament	Tier	Surface	Opponent	Score
Loss	0–1	Nov 2012	Mexico F14, Mérida	Futures	Hard	(France) Lucas Pouille	3–6, 3–6
Loss	0–2	May 2013	Greece F6, Marathon	Futures	Hard	(Czech Republic) Michal Konečný	7–5, 5–7, 5–7
Win	1–2	Sep 2013	Canada F9, Markham	Futures	Hard (i)	(Canada) Philip Bester	walkover
Loss	1–3	Jun 2014	Canada F3, Richmond	Futures	Hard	(United States) Dennis Novikov	6–1, 4–6, 4–6
Loss	1–4	Jul 2014	Canada F4, Kelowna	Futures	Hard	(Australia) Benjamin Mitchell	3–6, 6–2, 4–6
Win	2–4	Feb 2015	France F3, Feucherolles	Futures	Hard (i)	(Netherlands) Antal van der Duim	6–2, 6–4
Win	3–4	Nov 2015	Great Britain F11, Bath	Futures	Hard (i)	(Germany) Mats Moraing	2–6, 6–1, 6–2
Win	4–4	Sep 2016	Canada F8, Toronto	Futures	Hard	(United States) Rhyne Williams	6–3, 6–4
Win	5–4	Apr 2017	Egypt F12, Sharm El Sheikh	Futures	Hard	(Bosnia and Herzegovina) Aldin Šetkić	2–6, 6–3, 6–3
Win	6–4	Apr 2017	Egypt F14, Sharm El Sheikh	Futures	Hard	(Egypt) Issam Haitham Taweel	6–3, 6–3
Win	7–4	Apr 2017	Egypt F15, Sharm El Sheikh	Futures	Hard	(Tunisia) Moez Echargui	6–3, 6–4
Win	8–4	May 2017	Israel F7, Herzlia	Futures	Hard	(Israel) Edan Leshem	4–6, 6–1, 7–6^{(7–5)}
Win	9–4	May 2017	Israel F8, Netanya	Futures	Hard	(Israel) Dekel Bar	6–3, 7–5
Loss	9–5	Jul 2017	Canada F3, Kelowna	Futures	Hard	(United States) Alexander Sarkissian	2–6, 4–6
Win	10–5	Jul 2017	Canada F4, Saskatoon	Futures	Hard	(United States) Marcos Giron	7–6^{(9–7)}, 6–7^{(5–7)}, 6–1
Loss	10–6	Sep 2017	Canada F5, Calgary	Futures	Hard	(United States) Ulises Blanch	4–6 ret.
Win	1–0	Nov 2017	Knoxville, USA	Challenger	Hard (i)	(United States) Denis Kudla	6–4, 6–2
Loss	1–1	May 2019	Jerusalem, Israel	Challenger	Hard	(Serbia) Danilo Petrović	6–7^{(3–7)}, 7–6^{(10–8)}, 1–6
Loss	10–7	Aug 2021	M15 Gdynia, Poland	WTT	Clay	(Argentina) Román Andrés Burruchaga	7–6^{(7–2)}, 7–6^{(3–7)}, 1–6
Loss	10–8	Oct 2021	M15 Pretoria, South Africa	WTT	Hard	(Japan) Rio Noguchi	3–6, 5–7
Win	11–8	Oct 2021	M25 Nur-Sultan, Kazakhstan	WTT	Hard	(Russia) Andrey Kuznetsov	6–3, 7–5
Loss	11–9	Aug 2022	M15 Helsinki, Finland	WTT	Hard	(United Kingdom) Charles Broom	6–4, 4–6, 1–6
Win	12–9	Aug 2022	M25 Aldershot, United Kingdom	WTT	Hard	(Switzerland) Leandro Riedi	6–4, 7–6^{(7–5)}
Loss	12–10	Oct 2022	M25 Glasgow, United Kingdom	WTT	Hard (i)	(United Kingdom) Aidan McHugh	6–7^{(4–7)}, 4–6
Loss	12–11	Oct 2022	M25 Afula, Israel	WTT	Hard	(Israel) Daniel Cukierman	6–7^{(4–7)}, 3–6
Loss	12–12	Nov 2022	M25 Jerusalem, Israel	WTT	Hard	(Ukraine) Vladyslav Orlov	6–1, 1–6, 5–7
Loss	12–13	Jun 2023	M25 Netanya, Israel	WTT	Hard	(Poland) Martyn Pawelski	1–6, 5–7
Loss	12–14	Jul 2023	M25 Netanya, Israel	WTT	Hard	(Israel) Yshai Oliel	6–1, 6–7^{(5–7)}, 2–6
Loss	12–15	Sep 2024	M25 Pozzuoli, Italy	WTT	Hard	(Italy) Alessandro Pecci	2–6, 4–6
Loss	12–16	Apr 2025	M15 Luan, China	WTT	Hard	(Thailand) Pawit Sornlaksup	1–6, 3–6
Loss	12–17	Jul 2025	M15 Hillcrest, South Africa	WTT	Hard	(South Africa) Philip Henning	6–4, 4–6, 2–6
Loss	12–18	Apr 2026	M25 Anning, China	WTT	Clay	(Northern Mariana Islands) Colin Sinclair	3–6, 0–6

=== Doubles: 18 (5 titles, 13 runner-ups) ===
Legend ATP Challenger Tour (0–2) ITF Futures/WTT (5–11)	Finals by surface Hard (5–13) Clay (–)

Result	W–L	Date	Tournament	Tier	Surface	Partner	Opponents	Score
Loss	0–1	Aug 2012	Canada F6, Winnipeg	Futures	Hard	(Canada) Milan Pokrajac	(Japan) Yuichi Ito (Croatia) Ante Pavić	6–3, 3–6, [18–20]
Loss	0–2	May 2013	Greece F5, Heraklion	Futures	Hard	(Canada) Hugo Di Feo	(United Kingdom) Joshua Milton (Australia) Andrew Whittington	6–2, 3–6, [7–10]
Loss	0–3	Aug 2013	Canada F6, Winnipeg	Futures	Hard	(Australia) David Sofaer	(Croatia) Ante Pavić (Canada) Milan Pokrajac	0–6, 6–4, [11–13]
Loss	0–4	Mar 2014	Canada F1, Gatineau	Futures	Hard (i)	(Canada) Kamil Pajkowski	(United Kingdom) Edward Corrie (United Kingdom) Daniel Smethurst	6–7^{(4–7)}, 1–6
Loss	0–5	Sep 2014	Canada F11, Markham	Futures	Hard (i)	(Israel) Daniel Skripnik	(United States) Matt Seeberger (Czech Republic) Rudolf Siwy	2–6, 3–6
Win	1–5	Feb 2015	Tunisia F5, El Kantaoui	Futures	Hard	(Italy) Pietro Licciardi	(Japan) Hiroyasu Ehara (Japan) Takashi Saito	7–6^{(7–4)}, 7–6^{(7–5)}
Win	2–5	Oct 2015	France F23, Rodez	Futures	Hard (i)	(France) Fabien Reboul	(France) Jonathan Eysseric (France) Tom Jomby	6–7^{(2–7)}, 6–4, [10–4]
Loss	2–6	Nov 2015	Great Britain F11, Bath	Futures	Hard (i)	(Republic of Ireland) Sam Barry	(United Kingdom) Lloyd Glasspool (United Kingdom) Joshua Ward-Hibbert	4–6, 6–3, [2–10]
Win	3–6	Sep 2016	Canada F9, Niagara	Futures	Hard (i)	(Canada) Brayden Schnur	(Ecuador) Iván Endara (Chile) Nicolás Jarry	6–3, 6–3
Win	4–6	Apr 2017	Egypt F12, Sharm El Sheikh	Futures	Hard	(Bosnia and Herzegovina) Aldin Šetkić	(Ukraine) Vladyslav Manafov (Ukraine) Daniil Zarichanskyy	4–6, 6–3, [14–12]
Loss	4–7	Apr 2017	Egypt F15, Sharm El Sheikh	Futures	Hard	(Ukraine) Vladyslav Orlov	(Spain) David Jordà Sanchis (Spain) Jaime Pulgar-García	4–6, 6–3, [1–10]
Loss	4–8	May 2017	Israel F8, Netanya	Futures	Hard	(France) Yanais Laurent	(Switzerland) Antoine Bellier (France) Albano Olivetti	6–7^{(6–8)}, 5–7
Win	5–8	Jun 2017	Canada F3, Kelowna	Futures	Hard	(United States) Ronnie Schneider	(Antigua and Barbuda) Jody Maginley (United Kingdom) Mark Whitehouse	7–5, 6–4
Loss	5–9	Jul 2017	Canada F4, Saskatoon	Futures	Hard	(United States) Ronnie Schneider	(United States) Alexios Halebian (United States) Alexander Sarkissian	3–6, 6–7^{(0–7)}
Loss	0–1	Mar 2018	Drummondville, Canada	Challenger	Hard (i)	(Venezuela) Luis David Martínez	(Belgium) Joris De Loore (Denmark) Frederik Nielsen	4–6, 3–6
Loss	0–2	Feb 2020	Calgary, Canada	Challenger	Hard (i)	(Australia) Harry Bourchier	(United States) Nathan Pasha (United States) Max Schnur	6–7^{(4–7)}, 3–6
Loss	5–10	Jun 2021	M15 Monastir, Tunisia	WTT	Hard	(Argentina) Matías Franco Descotte	(South Korea) Hong Seong-chan (South Korea) Nam Ji-sung	3–6, 1–6
Loss	5–11	Nov 2022	M25 Jerusalem, Israel	WTT	Hard	(United Kingdom) Mattias Southcombe	(Israel) Daniel Cukierman (United Kingdom) Joshua Paris	3–6, 4–6

== Junior Grand Slam finals ==
=== Singles: 4 (2 titles, 2 runner-ups) ===
Result	Year	Tournament	Surface	Opponent	Score
Loss	2012	Australian Open	Hard	(Australia) Luke Saville	3–6, 7–5, 4–6
Loss	2012	French Open	Clay	(Belgium) Kimmer Coppejans	1–6, 4–6
Win	2012	Wimbledon	Grass	(Australia) Luke Saville	7–5, 6–4
Win	2012	US Open	Hard	(United Kingdom) Liam Broady	6–2, 2–6, 7–5

== Awards ==
- 2012 – ITF Junior World Champion

Awards
Preceded by (Czech Republic) Jiří Veselý	ITF Junior World Champion; 2012	Succeeded by (Germany) Alexander Zverev
